= Minister for Climate Change and Energy =

Australian cabinet position

- Commonwealth Coat of Arms

- Flag of Australia

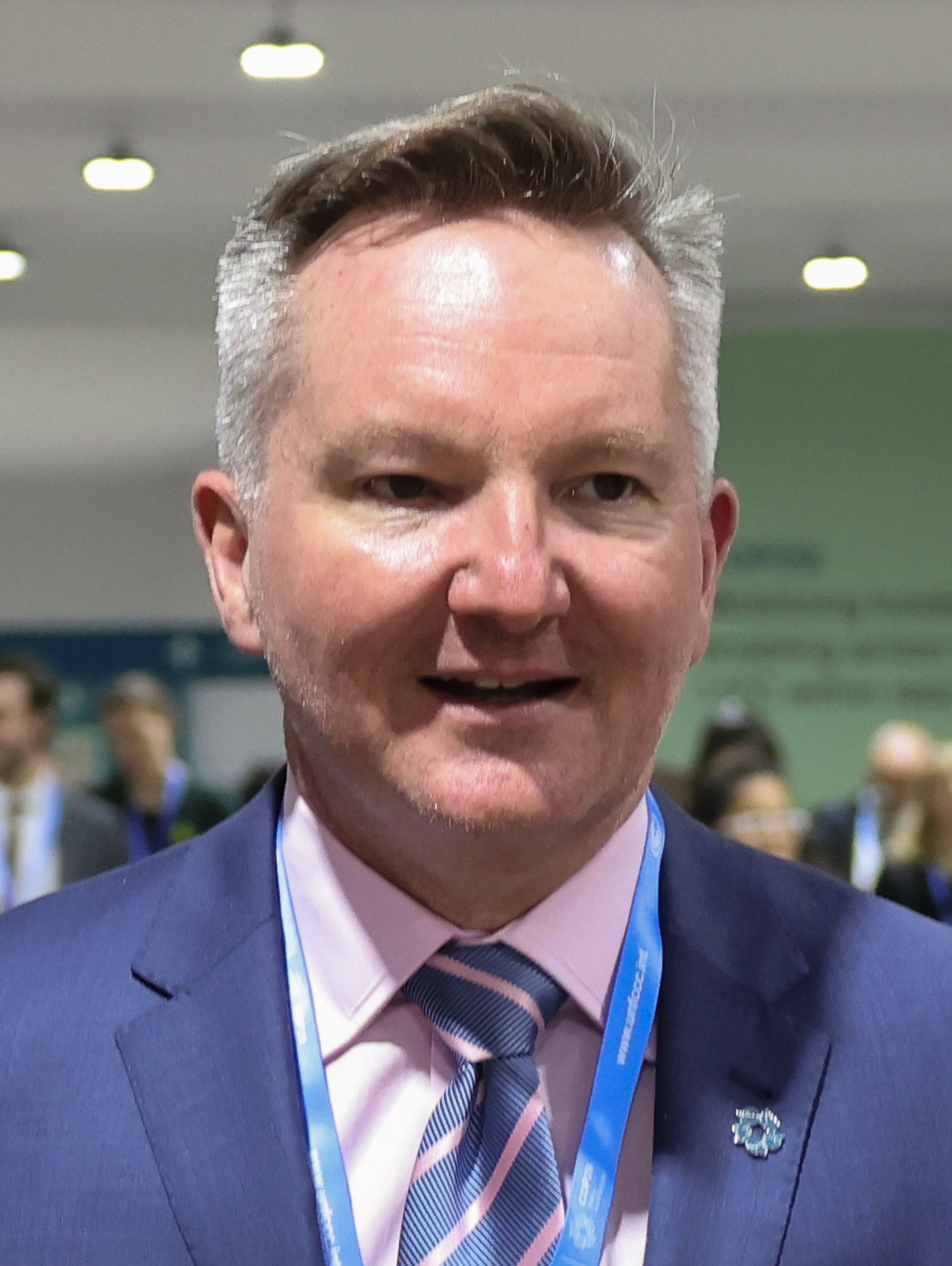
- Incumbent; Chris Bowen since 1 June 2022
- Department of Climate Change, Energy, the Environment and Water
- Style: The Honourable
- Appointer: Governor-General; on the advice of the prime minister
- Inaugural holder: Rex Connor (as Minister for Minerals and Energy)
- Formation: 19 December 1972
- Website: minister.dcceew.gov.au/Bowen

The minister for climate change and energy is a portfolio in the Government of Australia. The current minister is Chris Bowen. The minister administers his or her portfolios through the Department of Climate Change, Energy, the Environment and Water (established on 1 July 2022.).

The portfolio is a federal ministerial portfolio responsible for the coordination and implementation of sustainable energy policies by the Australian Government. These policy areas include the mitigation of greenhouse gas emissions, the promotion of energy efficiency, as well as adaptations to climate change within domestic and international contexts. The post was first held by Rex Connor in 1972 as Minister for Minerals and Energy.

== History ==
The precursor to the department was led by Secretary Blair Comley who reported to the Minister for Climate Change and Energy Efficiency, Greg Combet. The Minister was assisted by the Secretary for Climate Change and Energy Efficiency, Mark Dreyfus. The Clean Energy Regulator was an associated statutory authority formed on 2 April 2012.

On 25 March 2013, the responsibility for Climate Change policy passed to the newly formed Department of Industry, Innovation, Climate Change, Science, Research and Tertiary Education, and the duties of the Ministry of Energy passed to the Department of Resources, Energy and Tourism. Following the 2013 Australian federal election the responsibility for energy was shifted to the Minister for Industry, Innovation and Science under the Abbott government.

After the 2016 Australian federal election, the responsibilities were passed to the Minister of the Environment and Energy under the Turnbull government. Following the appointment of Scott Morrison as prime minister in August 2018, Josh Frydenberg was elevated to Treasurer of Australia, whereby Frydenberg's previous ministerial positions were separated, with Melissa Price as Minister of the Environment and Angus Taylor as Minister for Energy.

On 1 February 2020, An Administrative Arrangements Order (AAOs) was executed by the Australian Government. This order required small business and energy functions be passed to the renamed Department of Industry, Science, Energy and Resources.

== Objectives ==
The department deals with:

- Development and coordination of domestic and international climate change policy
- International climate change negotiations
- Design and implementation of emissions trading
- Mandatory renewable energy target policy, regulation, and co-ordination
- Greenhouse emissions and energy consumption reporting
- Climate change adaptation strategy and co-ordination
- Co-ordination of climate change science activities

== List of energy ministers ==
The following individuals have been appointed as energy minister, or any of its precedent titles:

Order	Minister	Party	Prime Minister	Title	Term start	Term end	Term in office
1	Rex Connor	Labor	Whitlam	Minister for Minerals and Energy	19 December 1972	14 October 1975	2 years, 299 days
2	Ken Wriedt	Labor	Whitlam	Minister for Minerals and Energy	14 October 1975	11 November 1975	28 days
3	John Carrick	Liberal	Fraser	Minister for National Development and Energy	8 December 1979	11 March 1983	3 years, 93 days
4	Peter Walsh	Labor	Hawke	Minister for Resources and Energy	11 March 1983	13 December 1984	1 year, 277 days
5	Gareth Evans	Labor	Hawke	Minister for Resources and Energy	13 December 1984	24 July 1987	2 years, 223 days
6	John Kerin	Labor	Hawke	Minister for Primary Industries and Energy	24 July 1987	4 June 1991	3 years, 315 days
7	Simon Crean	Labor	Hawke	Minister for Primary Industries and Energy	4 June 1991	20 December 1991	2 years, 202 days
7	Simon Crean	Labor	Keating	Minister for Primary Industries and Energy	20 December 1991	23 December 1993	2 years, 202 days
8	Bob Collins	Labor	Keating	Minister for Primary Industries and Energy	23 December 1993	11 March 1996	2 years, 79 days
9	John Anderson	National	Howard	Minister for Primary Industries and Energy	11 March 1996	21 October 1998	2 years, 224 days
9	Warwick Parer	Liberal	Howard	Minister for Resources and Energy	11 March 1996	21 October 1998	2 years, 224 days
10	Martin Ferguson	Labor	Rudd	Minister for Resources and Energy	3 December 2007	24 June 2010	5 years, 89 days
10	Martin Ferguson	Labor	Gillard	Minister for Resources and Energy	24 June 2010	22 March 2013	5 years, 89 days
11	Gary Gray	Labor	Gillard	Minister for Resources and Energy	22 March 2013	27 June 2013	180 days
11	Gary Gray	Labor	Rudd	Minister for Resources and Energy	27 June 2013	18 September 2013	180 days
12	Josh Frydenberg	Liberal	Turnbull	Minister for Resources, Energy and Northern Australia	21 September 2015	18 February 2016	2 years, 341 days
12	Josh Frydenberg	Liberal	Turnbull	Minister for Resources and Energy	18 February 2016	19 July 2016	2 years, 341 days
12	Josh Frydenberg	Liberal	Turnbull	Minister for the Environment and Energy	19 July 2016	28 August 2018	2 years, 341 days
13	Angus Taylor	Liberal	Morrison	Minister for Energy	28 August 2018	29 May 2019	3 years, 268 days
13	Angus Taylor	Liberal	Morrison	Minister for Energy and Emissions Reduction	29 May 2019	8 October 2021	3 years, 268 days
13	Angus Taylor	Liberal	Morrison	Minister for Industry, Energy and Emissions Reduction	8 October 2021	23 May 2022	3 years, 268 days
14	Chris Bowen	Labor	Albanese	Minister for Climate Change and Energy	1 June 2022	incumbent	4 years, 145 days

== List of ministers for climate change ==
The Minister for Climate Change is responsible for developing climate change (global warming) solutions, mitigating greenhouse gas emissions, and promoting energy efficiency. The following individuals have been appointed to the post, or any of its precursor titles:

Order	Minister	Party	Prime Minister	Title	Term start	Term end	Term in office
1	Penny Wong	Labor	Rudd	Minister for Climate Change and Water	3 December 2007	8 March 2010	2 years, 285 days
1	Penny Wong	Labor	Rudd	Minister for Climate Change, Energy Efficiency and Water	8 March 2010	24 June 2010	2 years, 285 days
1	Penny Wong	Labor	Gillard	Minister for Climate Change, Energy Efficiency and Water	24 June 2010	14 September 2010	2 years, 285 days
2	Greg Combet	Labor	Gillard	Minister for Climate Change and Energy Efficiency	14 September 2010	1 July 2013	2 years, 289 days
3	Mark Butler	Labor	Rudd	Minister for Climate Change	1 July 2013	18 September 2013	79 days
4	Chris Bowen	Labor	Albanese	Minister for Climate Change and Energy	1 June 2022	Incumbent	4 years, 145 days

== List of assistant ministers for climate change and energy ==
The following individuals have been appointed as Assistant Minister for Climate Change and Energy, or any of its precedent titles:

Order	Minister	Party	Prime Minister	Title	Term start	Term end	Term in office
1	Jenny McAllister	Labor	Albanese	Assistant Minister for Climate Change and Energy	1 June 2022	29 July 2024	2 years, 58 days
2	Josh Wilson	Labor	Albanese	Assistant Minister for Climate Change and Energy	29 July 2024	Incumbent	2 years, 87 days

== See also ==
- Carbon tax in Australia
- List of Australian Commonwealth Government entities
