= RDA =

RDA may refer to:

== Laws ==
- Rules of Decision Act, 1789, United States
- Racial Discrimination Act 1975, Australia

== Organisations ==
=== Government bodies ===
- Rawalpindi Development Authority, Pakistan (founded 1989)
- Redevelopment agency, a type of municipal department in the United States responsible for urban renewal
- Regional development agency, a class of local body in England (1998–2010)
- Road Development Authority, Sri Lanka (founded 1971)

=== Other organisations ===
- Rassemblement Démocratique Africain (1946–1958), a political party in French West Africa
- Reader's Digest Association, an American publisher
- Research Data Alliance, a research community organisation started in 2013
- Revolving Doors Agency, a British charity
- Riding for the Disabled Association, a British equestrian charity
- Rural Development Academy, an institution in Bangladesh

== People ==
- Rafael dos Anjos (born 1984), Brazilian mixed martial artist
- Richard Dean Anderson (born 1950), American actor

== Science, technology and mathematics ==
=== Biology and medicine ===
- Recommended Dietary Allowance, one of several recommendations referred to as a Dietary Reference Intake
- Representational difference analysis, a technique used to find sequence differences in two genomic or cDNA samples
- Registered dental assistant
- Relative dentin abrasivity, a measure of toothpaste's effects on tooth dentin

=== Computing ===
- Remote Database Access, a protocol
- Robotic data automation, the automation of tasks
- Remote diagnostic agent, an Oracle database diagnostic tool

=== Other uses in science and mathematics ===
- Rebuildable Dripping Atomizer, where liquid is dripped directly onto a coil
- Redundancy analysis, a method for ordination in statistics
- Retro-Diels–Alder reaction (rDA), a chemical reaction
- Research and Development Array, a cosmic ray detector development project
- Research Data Australia, a web portal for access to national research data, within Australian Research Data Commons

== Other uses ==
- Redland railway station, Bristol, England (CRS code: RDA)
- Resource Description and Access, a library cataloguing standard
- Resources Development Administration (RDA), a fictional megacorporation in the Avatar films
- Roshan Digital Account, a banking service for overseas Pakistanis
