= Blair Comley =

Australian public servant

Blair Comley PSM

Secretary of the Department of Climate Change and Energy Efficiency
- In office 2011 – March 2013

Secretary of the Department of Resources, Energy and Tourism
- In office 11 March 2013 – 18 September 2013

Secretary of the Department of Health and Aged Care
- Incumbent
- Assumed office July 2023

Personal details
- Born: Blair Robert Comley
- Education: Monash University; Australian National University
- Occupation: Public servant

Blair Robert Comley PSM is an economist. He is a former Secretary of the New South Wales Government Department of Premier and Cabinet, replaced by a new Secretary upon the election of premier Gladys Berejiklian.

== Life and career ==
Blair Comley was born in the late 1960s. He holds a Bachelor of Economics (Honours) and a Master of Economics from Monash University and a Graduate Diploma in Legal Studies from the Australian National University.

Comley joined the Department of the Treasury in 1994. For three years, he represented Australia on economic policy at the OECD. In 2008, Comley was appointed Deputy Secretary of the Department of Climate Change. He was elevated to become head of the Department—by then known as the Department of Climate Change and Energy Efficiency—in 2010.

Comley was appointed Secretary of the Department of Resources, Energy and Tourism in February 2013, to commence 11 March that year. In September 2013, after the Abbott government was sworn in, new Prime Minister Tony Abbott sacked Comley and two other departmental secretaries.

Comley was hired by PricewaterhouseCoopers in April 2014 as a Special Adviser in the Canberra Economics and Policy Team. By September 2014, he had been appointed head of the New South Wales Department of Premier and Cabinet. In November 2017, the NSW premier, Gladys Berejiklian announced he would be replaced by a new Secretary.

He was appointed Secretary of the Department of Health and Aged Care in July 2023.

== Awards ==
Comley was awarded a Public Service Medal in January 2012 for outstanding public service in the development of public policy, particularly in the areas of carbon pricing and emissions trading, tax policy design and debt management.

Government offices
Preceded by Martin Parkinson	Secretary of the Department of Climate Change and Energy Efficiency; 2011 – 2013	Succeeded by Don Russell as Secretary of the Department of Industry, Innovation, Climate Change, Science, Research and Tertiary Education
Preceded by Drew Clarke	Secretary of the Department of Resources, Energy and Tourism; 2013	Succeeded by Glenys Beauchamp as Secretary of the Department of Industry
Preceded by Drew Clarke	Secretary of the Department of Resources, Energy and Tourism; 2013	Succeeded by Peter Varghese as Secretary of the Department of Foreign Affairs and Trade
