= Heather Smith (public servant) =

Australian public servant

Heather Smith PSM
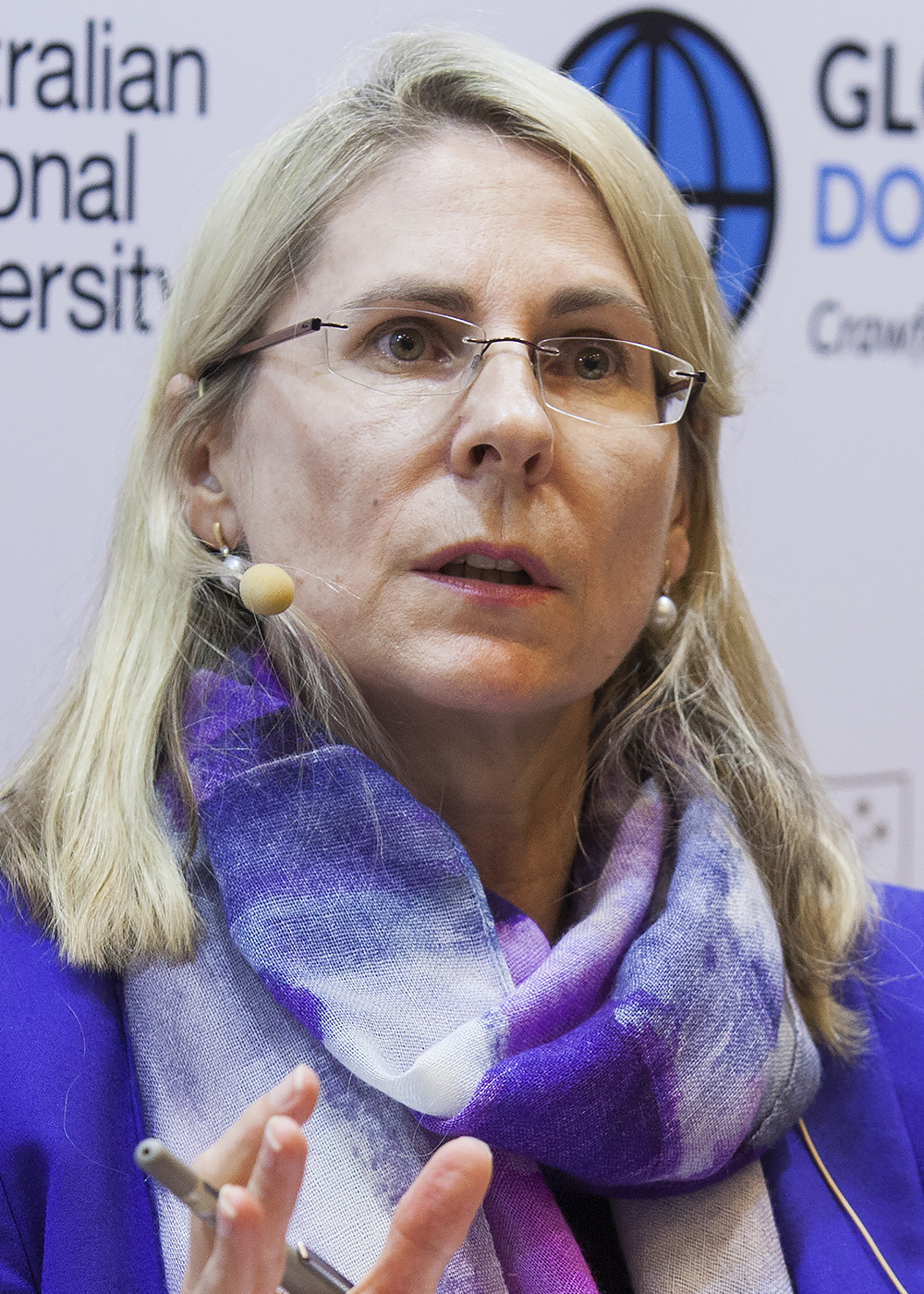
- Smith in 2017

Secretary of the Department of Industry, Innovation and Science
- Incumbent
- Assumed office 18 September 2017
- Preceded by: Glenys Beauchamp

Secretary of the Department of Communications and the Arts
- In office 25 January 2016 – 17 September 2017
- Preceded by: New department
- Succeeded by: Mike Mrdak

Personal details
- Born: Heather Joy Smith
- Spouse: Martin Parkinson
- Education: University of Queensland (BEc (Hons)); Australian National University (MEc, PhD)
- Occupation: Public servant

Heather Joy Smith PSM is an Australian public servant. She took up the position of Secretary of the Australian Government Department of Communications and the Arts in January 2016 and later headed the Department of Industry, Innovation and Science.

== Life and career ==
From 1984 to 1986, Smith lived at Emmanuel College, while studying at the University of Queensland. She graduated with a Bachelor of Economics, with first class honours, in 1986. In 1988 she took a job at the Reserve Bank of Australia, where she worked until 1990.

Commencing further education at the Australian National University, Smith completed a Masters of Economics in 1990 and graduated with a PhD in 1994. She was appointed an academic at the university between 1994 and 2000, specialising in North Asia.

Smith joined the Office of National Assessments in 2000, where she was Assistant Director-General in the International Economy Branch until 2003. She worked at the Treasury from 2003 to 2005, before returning to the Office of National Assessments between February 2005 and August 2010.

In August 2010, Smith joined the Department of Foreign Affairs and Trade as a Deputy Secretary. She was responsible for IT issues, the Americas, Africa, North Asia and international security issues. She shifted to the Department of the Prime Minister and Cabinet in September 2013, also as a Deputy Secretary. At PM&C she was G20 Sherpa—the Prime Minister's personal envoy for the 2014 G20 Brisbane summit. She attended a G20 Sherpa meeting in Moscow in 2013 and chaired G20 meetings in Australia at Uluru, Sydney and Melbourne. She also led the development of the policy agenda for the event.

Smith was appointed Secretary of the Department of Communications and the Arts in January 2016. Smith later became the secretary of the Department of Industry, Innovation and Science. She lost her job in December 2019 as part of changes made by Prime Minister Scott Morrison to the structure of departments. Four other departmental secretaries were sacked as part of these changes.

In June 2021 Smith became a professor at the Australian National University's National Security College. In 2023 she became National President of the Australian Institute of International Affairs.

== Honours ==
Smith was awarded a Public Service Medal in the 2015 Queen's Birthday Honours.

Government offices
Preceded by Drew Clarke as Secretary of the Department of Communications	Secretary of the Department of Communications and the Arts; 2016–2017	Succeeded by Mike Mrdak
Preceded by Glenys Beauchamp	Secretary of the Department of Industry, Innovation and Science; 2017–present	Incumbent
