= Oneflare =

Australian online marketplace

- Type: Private company
- Industry: Online marketplace
- Predecessor: PickAQuote.com.au
- Founded: 2011
- Founder: Marcus Lim, Adam Dong
- Successor: airtasker.com
- Headquarters: Sydney, Australia
- Area served: Australia
- Website: Oneflare.com.au

Oneflare, founded in 2011, is an Australian online marketplace that connects customers and businesses.

== History ==
Oneflare generates possible leads and allows businesses to pay Oneflare for the opportunity to call or email a potential lead.

In July 2014, Oneflare announced its acquisition of Renovate Forum, an Australian online renovation community. In the same year, the company's 1635% growth earned a place in Deloitte's Tech Fast 500 in APAC.

In February 2015, Oneflare acquired Melbourne-based reviews website, Word of Mouth Online (WOMO).

Billy Tucker joined Oneflare as CEO in February 2017.

As of June 2026, the Oneflare brand and platform has been retired and all previous users are directed to Airtasker.

== Funding ==
Oneflare is a venture backed startup that initially secured a A$50,000 Skills and Knowledge grant from Commercialisation Australia to engage professional external advisors to raise investment capital, develop website architecture and procure professional legal advice.

In May 2016, the company announced a partnership with the Fairfax's Domain Group to secure $15M investment in exchange for 35% equity, increasing the company's value to around $43M.

In May 2022, Airtasker acquired Oneflare for $2.25 million in cash and Airtasker shares issued at 43 cents, with 50 per cent placed in escrow for 12 months from issue and the rest in escrow for 24 months, a fraction of the nearly $50 million it was valued at in 2016 when Domain took a stake.

== Service process ==
Visitors to the Oneflare website provide details of the task they may want performed. The request is sent to a maximum of 3 service providers who pay Oneflare for the opportunity to see an email address or a phone number of the visitor to the website. The site lists over 200 service categories, including accountants, interior designers, cleaners, and electricians. The website verifies the licensing, ABN and insurance/indemnity details of service providers.

Real-time application (IOS & Android), SMS and email updates are sent to businesses, notifying them of relevant leads. The website provides the consumer with three quotations so the consumer can choose their preferred provider, who is contracted directly through the website to complete the work.
