= Rawdon Dalrymple =

Australian public servant and diplomat

Rawdon Dalrymple AO PSM

17th Ambassador of Australia to the United States
- In office 26 June 1985 – 1 April 1989
- Preceded by: Bob Cotton
- Succeeded by: Michael Cook

Personal details
- Born: Frederick Rawdon Dalrymple; 6 November 1930 Sydney, Australia
- Died: 29 September 2023 (aged 93) Australia
- Spouse(s): Ross Dalrymple (nee Williams) (1957)
- Education: University of Sydney; University of Oxford
- Occupation: Public servant, diplomat

Frederick Rawdon Dalrymple AO PSM (6 November 1930 – 29 September 2023) was an Australian public servant and diplomat.

Dalrymple was born in Sydney and educated at Shore School in North Sydney and the University of Sydney. In 1951, he was selected as the New South Wales Rhodes scholar for 1952 and went on to study at Oxford University in the United Kingdom.

Dalrymple joined the Department of External Affairs in 1957. He went on to appointments as Ambassador to Israel (1972–1975), Ambassador to Indonesia (1981–1985), Ambassador to the United States (1985–1989) and Ambassador to Japan (1989–1993).

In January 1987, Dalrymple was appointed an Officer of the Order of Australia in recognition of his public service as a diplomatic representative.

In 1994, Dalrymple retired from the foreign affairs department (by then the Department of Foreign Affairs and Trade).

In May 2007, he was awarded an Honorary Doctor of Science by the University of Sydney. Among other things, the award cited his place as one of Australia's most distinguished post-war diplomats.

He was a recipient of the Public Service Medal.

== Publications ==
- 1998. "Indonesia and the IMF: The Evolving Consequences of a Reforming Mission", Australian Journal of International Affairs, Vol 52(3), pp. 233–39.
- 2003. Continental Drift: Australia's Search for a Regional Identity. Aldershot, Hampshire, UK: Ashgate.

Diplomatic posts
Preceded by Marshall Johnston	Australian Ambassador to Israel; 1972–1975	Succeeded by Richard Smith
Preceded by Tom Critchley	Australian Ambassador to Indonesia; 1981–1985	Succeeded by Bill Morrison
Preceded by Bob Cotton	Australian Ambassador to the United States; 1985–1989	Succeeded by Michael Cook
Preceded by Geoff Miller	Australian Ambassador to Japan; 1989–1993	Succeeded by Ashton Calvert
