= Michael Cook (diplomat) =

Australian diplomat

Michael John Cook AO

14th Ambassador of Australia to the United States
- In office 20 April 1989 – 1 August 1993
- Prime Minister: Bob Hawke; Paul Keating
- Preceded by: Rawdon Dalrymple
- Succeeded by: Don Russell

Director-General of the Office of National Assessments
- In office 1981–1989
- Prime Minister: Malcolm Fraser; Bob Hawke
- Preceded by: Robert Furlonger
- Succeeded by: Walter Miller

Chief Executive Officer to the Prime Minister of Australia
- In office 1979–1981
- Prime Minister: Malcolm Fraser
- Succeeded by: David Kemp

Deputy high commissioner of Australia to the United Kingdom
- In office 1975–1979
- Prime Minister: Malcolm Fraser

Ambassador of Australia to Vietnam
- In office 26 July 1973 – 22 March 1974
- Prime Minister: Gough Whitlam
- Preceded by: Arthur Morris
- Succeeded by: Geoffrey Price

Personal details
- Born: 28 October 1931 Rangoon, Burma
- Died: 18 June 2017 (aged 85) London, England
- Education: University of Melbourne
- Occupation: diplomat

Michael John Cook AO (28 October 1931 – 18 June 2017) was an Australian diplomat.

He was the director-general of the Office of National Assessments from 1981 to 1989 before becoming the Ambassador of Australia to the United States from 1989 to 1993.

== Early life ==
Cook was born in Namtu, Burma on 28 October 1931, where his father HJM Cook, a Gallipoli veteran, worked in the oil industry.

The family settled in Melbourne in 1937. He attended Geelong Grammar School and was awarded a scholarship to attend Trinity College at the University of Melbourne where he studied law.

== Career ==
Cook's public service began in 1954 with a cadetship at the Department of External Affairs. His work took him to countries such as Egypt, Thailand, Indonesia and the United States.

In 1973, Cook was appointed as the Ambassador of Australia to Vietnam prior to being appointed the deputy high commissioner of Australia to the United Kingdom in 1975.

While working in London, Cook was convinced by Australian prime minister Malcolm Fraser to return to Australia in 1979 to become his chief executive officer in his private office.

After working for Fraser from 1979 to 1981, Cook became the Director-General of the Office of National Assessments. Serving in this role from 1981 to 1989, Cook became the longest serving director-general of ONA.

In 1989, Cook was appointed as the 14th Ambassador of Australia to the United States of America.

One of Cook's final duties in this role was opening an inquiry into whether the KGB had infiltrated the Australian Security Intelligence Organisation. The findings of this enquiry have never been released.

After concluding his role as the ambassador of Australia to the United States in 1993, Cook relocated to London where he was the chairman of the Menzies Centre for Australian Studies at King's College London from 1997 to 2011.

== Personal life ==
After becoming engaged in December 1956, Cook married art historian Helen Ibbitson in London and had four children.

After the couple divorced, Ibbitson relocated to the United States and married legal counsel to the National Gallery of Art Phillip C. Jessup Jr.

Cook married Catriona Juliet Matheson, a law academic, on 10 July 1970, and they had a son and a daughter.

Cook's daughter Genevieve Cook commenced a two-year relationship with Barack Obama in 1983.

For his public service, Cook was appointed as an Officer of the Order of Australia (AO) in the 1990 Australia Day Honours.

Cook died in London on 18 June 2017 at the age of 85. A private funeral service was held for Cook but relatives, friends and neighbours were invited to a public gathering at his home on 6 July 2017 to celebrate his life.

Inexplicably, Cook was posthumously chosen in 2018 to be a "patron of mateship" by Australia's ambassador to the United States Joe Hockey to support bilateral relations. Australian historian Frank Bongiorno described the announcement as "really puzzling".

Government offices
Preceded by	Chief Executive Officer of the Office of the Prime Minister of Australia; 1979 – 1981	Succeeded by David Kemp
Preceded by Robert Furlonger	Director-General of the Office of National Assessments; 1981 – 1989	Succeeded by Walter Miller
Diplomatic posts
Preceded by Rawdon Dalrymple	Australian Ambassador to the United States; 1989 – 1993	Succeeded by Don Russell
Preceded by Arthur Morris	Australian Ambassador to Vietnam; 1973 – 1974	Succeeded by Geoffrey Price
