= ARDC =

The abbreviation ARDC may refer to:

- Air Research and Development Command, later renamed the Air Force Systems Command
- Amateur Radio Digital Communications, a mode using IP addresses beginning with 44.x
- American Racing Drivers Club, a midget car racing sanctioning body in the East Coast of the United States
- American Research and Development Corporation, an early venture capital investment firm founded in 1946
- Attorney Registration and Disciplinary Commission, professional administrative entity that governs licensing and disciplinary actions for attorneys licensed to practice in the state of Illinois
- Auxiliary Repair Dock, Concrete of the US Navy
- Australian Research Data Commons, an initiative for research data in Australia
