= Glenys Beauchamp =

Australian public servant

Glenys Beauchamp AO PSM

Secretary of the Department of Regional Australia, Regional Development and Local Government
- In office 21 December 2010 – 14 December 2011

Secretary of the Department of Regional Australia, Local Government, Arts and Sport
- In office 14 December 2011 – 18 September 2013

Secretary of the Department of Industry
- In office 18 September 2013 – 23 December 2014

Secretary of the Department of Industry and Science
- In office 23 December 2014 – 21 September 2015

Secretary of the Department of Industry, Innovation and Science
- In office 21 September 2015 – 17 September 2017

Secretary of the Department of Health
- In office 18 September 2017 – 28 February 2020
- Preceded by: Martin Bowles
- Succeeded by: Brendan Murphy

Personal details
- Born: Glenys Ann Beauchamp
- Education: Australian National University; University of Canberra
- Occupation: Public servant

Glenys Ann Beauchamp AO PSM is a senior Australian public servant. She was a departmental secretary between 2010 and 2020, across multiple departments and portfolios.

== Life and career ==
Beauchamp was awarded a Bachelor of Economics from the Australian National University in 1977.

Beauchamp began her Australian Public Service career as a Graduate in the Industry Commission, an agency that existed between 1990 and 1998 and was responsible for holding public inquiries and reporting on matters referred by the Government; and reporting annually on the economic performance of industry, and the effects of assistance and regulation on industry and the economy.

Before 2006, Beauchamp held a number of positions in the ACT Public Service, including Deputy Chief Executive, Department of Disability, Housing and Community Services and Deputy CEO, Department of Health.

Beauchamp rejoined the Australian Public Service in 2002, in the Department of Family and Community Services.

In January 2006, Beauchamp was appointed a Deputy Secretary in the Department of Families, Community Services and Indigenous Affairs.

Between February and August 2009, Beauchamp was responsible for coordinating a whole of government response to the Victorian bushfires, chairing the Commonwealth Victorian Bushfire Inter-Departmental Committee.

In December 2010, then Prime Minister Julia Gillard appointed Beauchamp to the position of Secretary of the Department of Regional Australia, Regional Development and Local Government, after Beauchamp had been acting in the position since the Department was established in September 2010. In February 2011, the Australian Government nominated Beauchamp to the board of the Queensland Reconstruction Authority.

In February 2020 before retiring, Beauchamp destroyed her notebooks that contained meeting notes relating to the Sports rorts affair (2020). This action was performed prior to a senate inquiry hearing where she would have been required to provide evidence of the scandal, leaving many Australians baffled.

At the end of 2020, Beauchamp was appointed Chair of the Australian Building Codes Board (ABCB)

== Awards ==
Beauchamp was awarded a Public Service Medal in June 2010 for outstanding public service in coordinating the Australian Government's response to the 2009 Victorian bushfires. She was appointed an Officer of the Order of Australia in the 2023 Australia Day Honours.

Government offices
Preceded by Mike Mrdak as Secretary of the Department of Infrastructure, Transport, Regional Development and Local Government	Secretary of the Department of Regional Australia, Regional Development and Local Government; 2010–2011	Succeeded by Herself as Secretary of the Department of Regional Australia, Local Government, Arts and Sport
Preceded by Herself as Secretary of the Department of Regional Australia, Regional Development and Local Government	Secretary of the Department of Regional Australia, Local Government, Arts and Sport; 2011–2013	Succeeded by Mike Mrdak as Secretary of the Department of Infrastructure and Regional Development
Preceded by Don Russell as Secretary of the Department of Industry, Innovation, Climate Change, Science, Research and Tertiary Education	Secretary of the Department of Industry; 2013–2014	Succeeded by Herself as Secretary of the Department of Industry and Science
Preceded by Don Russell as Secretary of the Department of Industry, Innovation, Climate Change, Science, Research and Tertiary Education	Secretary of the Department of Industry; 2013–2014	Succeeded by Lisa Paul as Secretary of the Department of Education and Training
Preceded by Herself as Secretary of the Department of Industry	Secretary of the Department of Industry and Science; 2014–2015	Succeeded by Herself as Secretary of the Department of Industry, Innovation and Science
Preceded by Herself as Secretary of the Department of Industry and Science	Secretary of the Department of Industry, Innovation and Science; 2015–2017	Succeeded by Heather Smith
Preceded by Martin Bowles	Secretary of the Department of Health; 2017–2020	Succeeded by Brendan Murphy
