= Research Data Alliance =

Research community organization

- Abbreviation: RDA
- Formation: March 2013; 13 years ago
- Founder: European Commission, United States National Science Foundation, United States National Institute of Standards and Technology, Australia Department of Innovation
- Type: Non-profit; NGO
- Purpose: Building the social and technical bridges to enable open data sharing and re-use
- Region served: Global
- Members: 15,385
- Secretary General: Hilary Hanahoe
- Council Chair: Juan Bicarregui, Lee Wilson
- Co-chairs, Technical Advisory Board: Raphael Cobe, Niels Deriemaecker, Mingfang Wu
- Co-chairs, Organisational Advisory Board: Gabriella Pino , Shelley Stall
- Website: www.rd-alliance.org

The Research Data Alliance (RDA) is a global research community-driven organization started in 2013 by the European Commission, the US National Science Foundation and National Institute of Standards and Technology, and the Australian Department of Innovation. Its mission is to build the social and technical bridges to enable open sharing and re-use of data. The RDA vision is researchers and innovators openly sharing and resuing data across technologies, disciplines, and countries to address the grand challenges of society. In its initial years, the RDA was major recipient of support in the form of grants from its constituent members' governments. Since 2017, the RDA is sustained by its Organisational and Regional members.

As of March 2025, the RDA has over 15,000 individual members from over 150 countries.

== Structure ==
The RDA's main vehicle for outputs are 18-month long working groups that generate recommendations aimed at the RDA community. In addition to working groups, interest groups with no fixed lifetime can produce either informal or "supported" outputs which carry some degree of RDA endorsement.

== Meetings ==
The RDA organises two major plenary conferences a year that are often co-located within other international data sharing initiatives such as the 12th RDA plenary being part of "International Data Week, 2018" in Gaborone, co-organised by RDA, the ICSU World Data System (WDS), the ICSU Committee on Data for Science and Technology (CODATA), University of Botswana (UoB) and the Academy of Science of South Africa (ASSAf). RDA aims to spread the plenary meetings across many of its members' locales with recent plenaries being held in Helsinki, Philadelphia, Berlin, Gaborone, Montréal, Barcelona, Denver, Tokyo, Paris, San Diego, Amsterdam, Dublin, Washington DC and Gothenburg, Sweden. Edinburgh, Costa Rica and Melbourne have hosted virtual plenaries.

== Partnerships ==
The RDA partners with data sharing organisations across the globe, such as the Australian National Data Service (ANDS), an "influence over the kinds of data sharing environments that Australian researchers will work with when they collaborate with international colleagues". The RDA is partnered with many major international data initiatives such as DataCite and frequently forms joint working groups with them, such as with the World Data System.
