= Peter Hastings =

Peter Hastings may refer to:

- Peter Hastings (director) (born 1960), American writer, producer, and director of animated TV and films
- Peter Hastings (journalist) (1920–1964), Australian journalist and editor
- Peter Hastings, fictional character from the TV series Pretty Little Liars

== See also ==
- Peter Hastings-Bass (1920–1964), British racehorse trainer born Peter Hastings
