= Department of Industry and Science =

Australian government department, 2014–2015

Department overview
- Formed: 23 December 2014
- Preceding Department: Department of Industry
- Dissolved: 21 September 2015
- Superseding Department: Department of Industry, Innovation and Science
- Jurisdiction: Australian Government
- Employees: 4926 (at 31 December 2014)
- Ministers responsible: Ian Macfarlane, Minister for Industry and Science; Karen Andrews, Parliamentary Secretary to the Minister for Industry and Science
- Department executive: Glenys Beauchamp, Secretary
- Website: www.industry.gov.au

The Department of Industry and Science was a department of the Australian Government responsible for consolidating the Government's efforts to drive economic growth, productivity and competitiveness by bringing together industry, energy, resources and science.

== History ==
The department was established on 23 December 2014, taking on most of the functions of the previous Department of Industry; but transferring skills responsibilities to the Department of Education and Training.

The Department's creation, and the associated swearing in of Industry Minister Ian Macfarlane when he added "Science" to his title, was seen by several media outlets as an admission from the Abbott government that it had been a mistake to not have a dedicated Science minister in 2014.

The Department was abolished and replaced with the Department of Industry, Innovation and Science in September 2015, to create a new federal government focus on innovation.

== Scope ==
As outlined in the December 2014 Administrative Arrangements Orders, the department was responsible for a wide range of functions including:

- Manufacturing and commerce including industry and market development
- Industry innovation policy and technology diffusion
- Construction industry, excluding workplace relations
- Facilitation of the development of service industries generally
- Trade marks, plant breeders' rights and patents of inventions and designs
- Anti-dumping
- Civil space issues
- Science policy
- Energy policy
