= Nick Waterlow =

Australian art historian (1941–2009)

Nicholas Anthony Ronald Waterlow OAM (30 August 1941 – 9 November 2009) was a curator at the Ivan Dougherty Gallery at UNSW in Sydney, Australia until his death. He was well known and respected as an expert on the history of art in Australia and was on the editorial board of the Art & Australia magazine. He was notable for his curating at the Biennale of Sydney at the Art Gallery of New South Wales and a retrospective of the pop artist Martin Sharp.

Waterlow was awarded the Medal of the Order of Australia (OAM) in the 1990 Australia Day Honours for "service to the arts".

== Death ==
Waterlow and his wife, Romy, had three children. In November 2009, Nick Waterlow and his daughter, Chloe Heuston, were found dead at home in Randwick. Nick Waterlow's son, a paranoid schizophrenic, Anthony Waterlow, was convicted of the killings.

== See also ==
- Visual arts of Australia
