= Department of Finance and Administration =

Australian government department, 1997–2007

Department overview
- Formed: 9 October 1997
- Preceding Department: Department of Finance (I) Department of Administrative Services (IV)
- Dissolved: 3 December 2007
- Superseding Department: Department of Finance and Deregulation
- Jurisdiction: Commonwealth of Australia
- Headquarters: Canberra
- Employees: 918 (at 30 June 2000)
- Ministers responsible: John Fahey, Minister (1997–2001); Nick Minchin, Minister (2001–2007)
- Department executives: Peter Boxall, Secretary (1997–2001); Ian Watt, Secretary (2001–2007)

The Department of Finance and Administration (also called DOFA) was an Australian government department tasked to contribute to sustainable Government finances; improved and more efficient Government operations; and efficiently functioning Parliament. The department existed between October 1997 and December 2007, operating under the Howard government.

== Outcomes and scope ==
The department contributed to three key outcomes: sustainable Government finances; improved and more efficient Government operations; and efficiently functioning Parliament.

Information about the department's functions and government funding allocation could be found in the Administrative Arrangements Orders, the annual Portfolio Budget Statements, in the department's annual reports and on the department's website.

At its creation, the department dealt with:

- Evaluation and review of government programs and associated expenditure and staffing proposals
- Expenditure and staffing estimates
- Government financial administration and accounts, including administration of the Public Account
- Commission of Audit
- Commonwealth superannuation schemes
- General policy guidelines for Commonwealth statutory authorities, Commonwealth companies and government business enterprises and monitoring the financial performance of government business enterprises
- Oversight of Commonwealth public sector financial management policy development
- Conduct of major asset sales
- In relation to natural disaster relief arrangements, financial assistance to the States, the Australian Capital Territory and the Northern Territory
- Acquisition, leasing, management and disposal of land and property in Australia and overseas
- Transport and storage services
- Co-ordination of purchasing policy and civil purchasing
- Disposal of goods
- Planning, execution and maintenance of Commonwealth Government works
- Design and maintenance of Government furniture, furnishings and fittings
- Government printing and publishing services
- Electoral matters
- Provision of facilities for Members of Parliament other than in Parliament House
- Administrative support for Royal Commissions and certain other inquiries
- Information co-ordination and services within Australia, including advertising

== Structure ==
The department was an Australian Public Service department, staffed by officials responsible to the Minister for Finance and Administration, initially John Fahey (until November 2001) and then Nick Minchin.

== References and further reading ==
- Department of Finance and Administration (September 2000), Department of Finance and Administration Annual Report 1999–2000 (PDF), Department of Finance and Administration, ISBN 0 642 44859 0, archived from the original (PDF) on 15 January 2004
