= Department of Industry, Innovation, Science, Research and Tertiary Education =

Australian government department, 2011–2013

Department overview
- Formed: 14 December 2011
- Preceding Department: Department of Innovation, Industry, Science and Research
- Dissolved: 25 March 2013
- Superseding Department: Department of Industry, Innovation, Climate Change, Science, Research and Tertiary Education
- Jurisdiction: Commonwealth of Australia
- Headquarters: Canberra
- Employees: 4828 (at June 2012)
- Department executive: Don Russell, Secretary

The Department of Industry, Innovation, Science, Research and Tertiary Education was an Australian government department that existed between December 2011 and March 2013.

== Scope ==
Information about the department's functions and government funding allocation could be found in the Administrative Arrangements Orders, the annual Portfolio Budget Statements, in the department's annual reports and on the Department's website.

At its creation, the department was responsible for the following:

- Manufacturing and commerce including industry and market development
- Industry innovation policy and technology diffusion
- Promotion of industrial research and development, and commercialisation
- Biotechnology, excluding gene technology regulation
- Marketing of manufactures and services
- Enterprise improvement
- Construction industry
- Small business policy and implementation
- Business entry point management
- Facilitation of the development of service industries generally
- Trade marks, plant breeders’ rights and patents of inventions and designs
- Country of origin labelling
- Weights and measures standards
- Civil space issues Analytical laboratory services
- Science policy
- Promotion of collaborative research in science and technology
- Co-ordination of research policy
- Creation and development of research infrastructure
- Commercialisation and utilisation of public sector research relating to portfolio programs and agencies
- Research grants and fellowships
- Information and communications technology industry development
- Food industry policy
- Training, including apprenticeships and training and assessment services
- Support for introduction of a national occupation licensing system
- Higher education, skills and vocational education policy and programs
- Indigenous higher education and vocational training
- Policy, coordination and support for international education
- Income support policies and programs for students and apprentices

== Structure ==
The department was an Australian Public Service department, staffed by officials who were responsible to the Minister for Tertiary Education, Skills, Science and Research, Chris Evans (December 2011 to February 2013) and Chris Bowen (February 2014 to March 2013) and the Minister for Industry and Innovation and Minister for Climate Change and Energy Efficiency, Greg Combet.
