= RIF-CS =

XML vocabulary

The Registry Interchange Format - Collections and Services (RIF-CS) is an XML vocabulary for representing metadata about data collections and related entities based on ISO 2146.

It is a machine-readable format to describe metadata about data collections. Similar to how MARC standards are used by library systems to describe books, RIF-CS is used to describe data collections. For example, a RIF-CS record can describe a spreadsheet containing experimental results: it might contain the title, description, creator, keywords, date the experiment was conducted and a URL to obtain the actual spreadsheet. Another RIF-CS record can describe the person who created the spreadsheet: it might contain their name, address and contact email.

RIF-CS documents, containing RIF-CS records, are exchanged between computer systems. For example, a university can send the RIF-CS documents to a national database, where it can be indexed and searched. People can download RIF-CS records from a national database to use the information to find out more about the data and/or the researcher.

== Model ==
The metadata describes the entity as well relationships between the entities. RIF-CS represents metadata about the following types of entities, which it calls registry objects:

- Collections
- Parties
- Activities
- Services

These entities are based on the entities defined in ISO 2146.

The registry objects contain either embedded information or links to other registry objects. Some information is represented directly in the registry object; for example: names, descriptions and dates. Other information is represented by a link to another registry object: for example, the creator for a collection (research data) is a link to another registry object that describes the party (a researcher).

== Use ==
RIF-CS is used in Australian universities and industry as a format for submitting metadata to the Australian National Data Service (ANDS) Research Data Australia service.

In that context, collections represent collections of research data; parties represent people and groups; activities represent research projects or programs; services represent ways to access the research data collections.

RIF-CS is only a representation of the metadata. To exchange RIF-CS a protocol, such as OAI-PMH, is used.

== Example ==
This example RIF-CS document contains a collection record and a party record.

  <?xml version="1.0"?>
  <registryObjects xmlns="https://ands.org.au/standards/rif-cs/registryObjects">
   
    <registryObject group="G1">
      <key>urn:uuid:7d9127c5-b97e-4474-87a3-68f2c219c609</key>
      <originatingSource>https://www.example.com/thales/source</originatingSource>
      <collection type="dataset" dateModified="2013-03-14T15:09:26Z">
        <identifier type="local">urn:uuid:dec9b127-0d24-4d12-aaf2-a71e9ed29f75</identifier>
        <name type="primary"><namePart>Test data</namePart></name>
        <name type="alternative"><namePart>Data for testing</namePart></name>
        <description type="full">Data used for testing.</description>
        <subject type="local">test</subject>
        <location>
           <address>
             <electronic type="email">
               <value>admin@example.edu</value>
             </electronic>
           </address>
         </location>
         <location>
           <address>
             <electronic type="url">
               <value>https://www.example.edu/data/1234</value>
             </electronic>
           </address>
         </location>
         <coverage>
           <temporal>
             <date type="dateFrom" dateFormat="W3CDTF">2012</date>
             <date type="dateTo" dateFormat="W3CDTF">2013</date>
           </temporal>
         </coverage>
         <relatedInfo>
           <identifier type="uri">https://www.example.com/foobar</identifier>
         </relatedInfo>
         <relatedObject>
           <key>urn:uuid:30fda6cd-5b08-4376-a1b7-2ee40144d9da</key>
           <relation type="hasCollector"/>
         </relatedObject>
      </collection>
    </registryObject>
   
    <registryObject group="G1">
      <key>urn:uuid:30fda6cd-5b08-4376-a1b7-2ee40144d9da</key>
      <originatingSource>https://www.example.com/thales/source</originatingSource>
      <party type="person" dateModified="2013-03-14T07:14:25Z">
        <identifier type="ORCID">https://orcid.org/0000-0002-9501-6966</identifier>
        <name type="primary">
          <namePart type="title">Dr</namePart>
          <namePart type="given">John</namePart>
          <namePart type="family">Citizen</namePart>
        </name>
      </party>
    </registryObject>
   
  </registryObjects>
