= Department of Regional Australia, Regional Development and Local Government =

Australian Government article 2010–2011

Department overview
- Formed: 14 September 2010
- Preceding Department: Department of Infrastructure, Transport, Regional Development and Local Government
- Dissolved: 14 December 2011
- Superseding Department: Department of Regional Australia, Local Government, Arts and Sport
- Jurisdiction: Commonwealth of Australia
- Minister responsible: Simon Crean, Minister for Regional Australia, Regional Development and Local Government
- Department executive: Glenys Beauchamp, Secretary
- Website: regional.gov.au

The Department of Regional Australia, Regional Development and Local Government was an Australian Government department that existed between September 2010 and December 2011.

== Functions ==
In an Administrative Arrangements Order made on 14 September 2010, the functions of the department were broadly classified into the following matters:

- Administration of the Jervis Bay Territory, the Territory of Cocos (Keeling) Islands, the Territory of Christmas Island, the Coral Sea Islands Territory, the Territory of Ashmore and Cartier Islands, and of Commonwealth responsibilities on Norfolk Island
- Constitutional development of the Northern Territory
- Constitutional development of the Australian Capital Territory
- Delivery of regional and rural specific services
- Planning and land management in the Australian Capital Territory
- Regional development
- Matters relating to local government
- Regional Australia policy and co-ordination
- Support for ministers and parliamentary secretaries with regional responsibilities

== Intended outcomes ==
The department worked to help the Government of the day achieve its policy objectives by contributing to, and reporting against two key outcomes. The 2010–11 departmental annual report (which was the only annual report released by the department during its short period of operation) identified the outcomes as:

- Coordinated community infrastructure in rural, regional and local government areas through financial assistance.
- Good governance in the Australian territories through the maintenance and improvement of the overarching legislative framework for self-governing territories and laws and services for non self-governing territories.

== Structure ==
During its life, the Department of Regional Australia, Regional Development and Local Government was accountable to Simon Crean as the Minister for Regional Australia, Regional Development and Local Government.

The department was staffed by Australian Public Service officials and headed by a Secretary, Glenys Beauchamp. The department's staff numbered approximately 330.

== References and further reading ==
- Department of Regional Australia, Regional Development and Local Government (October 2011), Department of Regional Australia, Regional Development and Local Government Annual Report 2010–11 (PDF), Department of Regional Australia, Regional Development and Local Government, ISBN 978-0-9870837-4-6, archived from the original (PDF) on 20 April 2013
- Department of Regional Australia, Local Government, Arts and Sport (October 2012), Department of Regional Australia, Local Government, Arts and Sport Annual Report 2011–12 (PDF), Department of Regional Australia, Local Government, Arts and Sport, ISBN 978-1-922060-12-9, archived from the original (PDF) on 20 April 2013
