= Department of Resources, Energy and Tourism =

Australian government department, 2007–2013

Department overview
- Formed: 3 December 2007
- Preceding Department: Department of Industry, Tourism and Resources
- Dissolved: 18 September 2013
- Superseding Department: Department of Industry Department of Foreign Affairs and Trade
- Jurisdiction: Commonwealth of Australia
- Headquarters: Canberra
- Employees: 685 (at June 2013)
- Department executives: Peter Boxall, Secretary (2007–2008); John Pierce, Secretary (2009–2010); Drew Clarke, Secretary (2010–2013); Blair Comley, Secretary (2013)

The Department of Resources, Energy and Tourism was an Australian Government department. It was formed in December 2007 and dissolved on 18 September 2013. The majority of its functions were assumed by the Department of Industry; with the exception of tourism functions that were assumed by the Department of Foreign Affairs and Trade.

== Operational activities ==
The functions of the department were broadly classified into the following matters:

- Energy policy
- Mineral and energy industries, including oil and gas, and electricity
- National energy market
- Energy-specific international organisations and activities
- Administration of export controls on rough diamonds, uranium and thorium
- Minerals and energy resources research, science and technology
- Tourism industry
- Geoscience research and information services including geodesy, mapping, remote sensing and land information co-ordination
- Radioactive waste management
- Renewable energy technology development
- Clean fossil fuel energy
- Industrial energy efficiency
- energy sources

-fossil fuels

== Structure ==
The Department was an Australian Public Service department, staffed by officials who were responsible to the Minister for Resources, Energy and Tourism.

=== Secretary ===
The Department was headed by a Secretary, initially Peter Boxall. When Boxall announced his retirement in 2008, John Pierce was appointed in his place. Pierce was succeeded by Drew Clarke in April 2010. Clarke shifted to the Department of Broadband, Communications and the Digital Economy in February 2013.
