= John Pierce (public servant) =

John Pierce AO

Secretary of the Department of Resources, Energy and Tourism
- In office 2 March 2009 – 2010

Personal details
- Education: University of New South Wales
- Occupation: Public servant

John Eric Pierce AO is a senior Australian public servant and policymaker. From 2010 to 2020, he acted as Chairman of the Australian Energy Market Commission.

== Life and career ==
Pierce joined the NSW Department of the Treasury in 1993 as its Chief Economist. He went on to become Secretary of the Department for nearly 12 years from 1997 until November 2008, becoming NSW's longest serving Treasury Secretary since 1922.

During his time as Secretary of the NSW Treasury, Pierce was a key architect of the Iemma government's plan to privatise the state's electricity industry. Between August 2004 and January 2005 he was on assignment in the United States, based at Boston University to explore policy options to respond to long-term budget pressures from an aging population and expenditure growth.

In March 2009, Pierce joined the Australian Public Service, as Secretary of the Department of Resources, Energy and Tourism.

In June 2010, Pierce was appointed Chairman and Commissioner of the Australian Energy Market Commission.

Pierce was named an Officer of the Order of Australia (AO) in the 2018 Australia Day Honours, "for distinguished service to public administration through senior roles in developing regulatory and policy initiatives and micro-economic and energy market reforms, and to the community."

Government offices
| Preceded by Peter Boxall | Secretary of the Department of Resources, Energy and Tourism; 2009–2010 | Succeeded by Drew Clarke |
