= Womo =

Word of Mouth
- Website type: Review site
- Available in: English
- Owner: Word Of Mouth Online Pty. Ltd.
- Website: www.wordofmouth.com.au
- Registration: available
- Launched: 2007; 19 years ago
- Current status: Active

Word of Mouth (previously WOMO - Word Of Mouth Online) is business review site containing crowd-sourced reviews of local businesses in Australia. The site is entirely based on user-generated content and, in 2013, it was considered by Kochie's Business Builders as the top business review website in Australia with 400,000 reviews for businesses based in Australia.

== History ==
Word of Mouth was founded in 2007 as WOMOW Pty Ltd by Fiona Adler and Brad Bond. They conceived the initial idea for Word of Mouth from Adler's difficulty in locating good local tradespeople in the Melbourne area. Initially the site was focused on businesses in Melbourne, later, in 2008, it expanded to the whole of Australia. The website is solely built on user-generated confined content, and a business listing is added when members first review a business on the website.

In 2011, the 'W' was dropped from the acronym and launched as womo.com.au.

As of 2014, Word of Mouth has 400,000 reviews for 160,000 local businesses operating in Australia.

The company was bought by Oneflare Pty Ltd in early 2015 and have since relocated to Sydney working in the offices with Oneflare.

In 2016, it underwent a brand refresh and was re-launched as Word of Mouth.

As of December 2019, the site claims to have over 624,000 reviews.
