= Don Russell =

Australian public servant

Dr Don Russell

Chief Executive of the Department of State Development
- In office 30 June 2014 – 13 February 2017

Secretary of the Department of Innovation, Industry, Science and Research
- In office 1 June 2011 – 14 December 2011

Secretary of the Department of Industry, Innovation, Science, Research and Tertiary Education
- In office 14 December 2011 – 25 March 2013

Secretary of the Department of Industry, Innovation, Climate Change, Science, Research and Tertiary Education
- In office 25 March 2013 – 18 September 2013

15th Ambassador of Australia to the United States
- In office 22 August 1993 – 1 December 1995
- Preceded by: Michael Cook
- Succeeded by: John McCarthy

Personal details
- Education: London School of Economics; Australian National University; Flinders University
- Occupation: Public servant

Donald Russell is a former senior Australian public servant and administrator. He is currently the chairman of AustralianSuper, Australia's largest superannuation fund.

== Education ==
Russell has a PhD from the London School of Economics, a Masters of Economics from the Australian National University and a Bachelor of Economics with first-degree honours from Flinders University.

== Career ==
Russell joined the Australian Public Service as a cadet in the Department of the Treasury.

Between 1985 and 1993, Russell was principal advisor to Treasurer Paul Keating.

In 1993, Russell was named Ambassador to the United States, based in Washington. He returned to Canberra in 1995 to again work as principal adviser to Paul Keating, by then Prime Minister, ahead of the 1996 federal election. Shortly after the Australian Government announced that Russell would be returning to Australia, Russell made comments criticising the Opposition. This led Shadow Foreign Minister Alexander Downer to denounce his actions and call for him to step down immediately.

The Keating Government went on to be defeated at the 1996 election and there had been speculation that if Keating had won that election he would have appointed Russell as Governor of the Reserve Bank.

Between 1997 and 2000, Russell worked for the research and money management firm Sanford C. Bernstein in New York. In 2001 he returned to Sydney and took a position with WestLB Asset Management. In January 2008, State Super (NSW) appointed Russell as Independent Chairperson. Russell worked at BNY Mellon Asset Management Australia as Global Investment Strategist until March 2010.

Russell was appointed to the role of Secretary of the Department of Innovation, Industry, Science and Research in June 2011. He managed the Department through several changes of function and Minister as it transitioned to become first the Department of Industry, Innovation, Science, Research and Tertiary Education and later the Department of Industry, Innovation, Climate Change, Science, Research and Tertiary Education.

From November 2011 to November 2012, Russell was a director on the Board of the CSIRO, an Australian Government science and research organisation.

He was one of three public servant heads to be sacked by the incoming Abbott government in September 2013, most likely due to his time as Labor Prime Minister Paul Keating's senior adviser.

In June 2014 his appointment to head the South Australia Department of State Development was announced, and he formally commenced work on 4 August. On his appointment, South Australian Premier Jay Weatherill praised his "strong apprehension of how Government can leverage investment and develop the skills required by industry". In the role, Russell is tasked with leading his department to guide industry, business and communities identify and capitalise upon opportunities for job creation and economic growth.

Since 2015, Russell has been a member of the South Australia and the Northern Territory State Advisory Council for the Committee for Economic Development of Australia.

Following the March 2018 SA general election, the victorious Marshall government announced that Russell would be replaced in his public service role.

== Resources sector advocacy ==
In his first public address as chief executive of South Australia's Department of State Development Russell advocated for the growth of the state's resources sector. He told a mining conference in Whyalla that "a growing number of successful mines (will) create a virtuous circle supporting an expanding array of industry-backed research initiatives along with exploration and mining service companies." He described the new department's roles to include ensuring that universities "turn world-class research into commercial results" and that the current regulatory framework is retained in order to facilitate new investment into the state. The South Australian government subsequently announced that "unlocking the full potential of South Australia’s resources, energy and renewable assets" was its top economic priority.

== Awards ==
Russell received the 1995 Flinders University Convocation Medal. In 2005, Russell was added to the distinguished Alumni Hall of Fame of the Faculty of Economics and Commerce at the Australian National University. He has held the Chartered Financial Analyst designation since 2007.

Government offices
Preceded by Mark Paterson	Secretary of the Department of Innovation, Industry, Science and Research; 2011	Succeeded by Himself as Secretary of the Department of Industry, Innovation, Science, Research and Tertiary Education
Preceded by Himself as Secretary of the Department of Innovation, Industry, Science and Research	Secretary of the Department of Industry, Innovation, Science, Research and Tertiary Education; 2011 – 2013	Succeeded by Himself as Secretary of the Department of Industry, Innovation, Climate Change, Science, Research and Tertiary Education
Preceded by Himself as Secretary of the Department of Industry, Innovation, Science, Research and Tertiary Education	Secretary of the Department of Industry, Innovation, Climate Change, Science, Research and Tertiary Education; 2013	Succeeded by Glenys Beauchamp as Secretary of the Department of Industry
Preceded by Blair Comley as Secretary of the Department of Climate Change and Energy Efficiency	Secretary of the Department of Industry, Innovation, Climate Change, Science, Research and Tertiary Education; 2013	Succeeded by Glenys Beauchamp as Secretary of the Department of Industry
Diplomatic posts
Preceded by Michael Cook	Australian Ambassador to the United States; 1993 – 1995	Succeeded by John McCarthy
