= List of ambassadors of Australia to the United States =

Ambassador of Australia to the United States

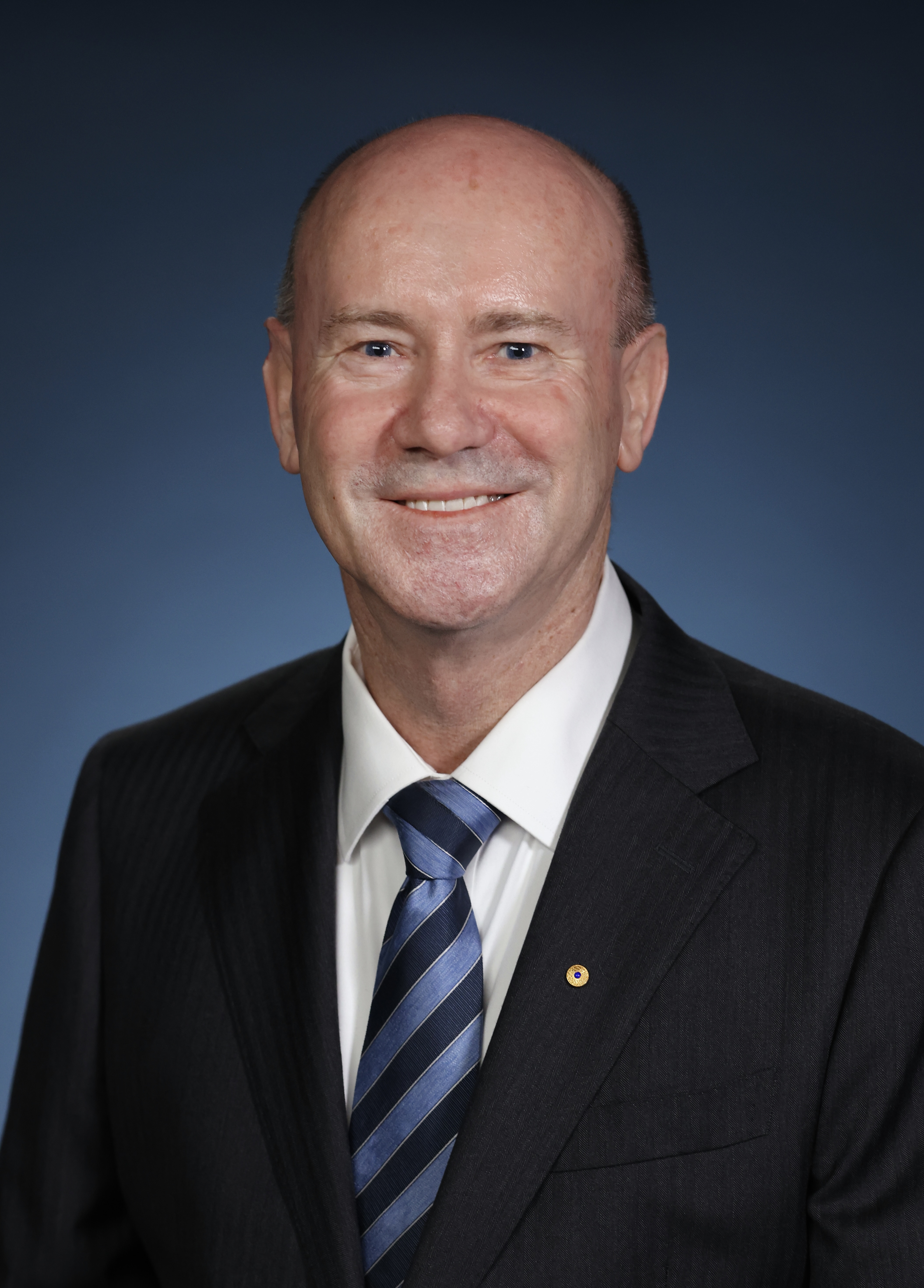
- Incumbent; Greg Moriarty since 1 April 2026
- Department of Foreign Affairs and Trade
- Style: His Excellency
- Reports to: Minister for Foreign Affairs
- Residence: White Oaks, 3120 Cleveland Avenue, Washington DC
- Seat: Embassy of Australia, Washington, D.C.
- Nominator: Prime Minister of Australia
- Appointer: Governor General of Australia
- Inaugural holder: The Lord Casey
- Formation: 1 March 1940
- Website: Embassy of Australia

The ambassador of Australia to the United States is an officer of the Australian Department of Foreign Affairs and Trade and the director of the Embassy of the Commonwealth of Australia to the United States of America. The embassy is located in Washington, D.C. It is Australia's third-oldest ambassadorial post, after the High Commissions in London (1910) and Ottawa (1939). The role has the rank and status of an ambassador extraordinary and plenipotentiary. The current ambassador, since April 2026, is Greg Moriarty. The ambassador's work is assisted by multiple consulates throughout the country that have visiting and reporting responsibilities, as well as consular and trade matters for the embassy.

== Posting history ==
The United States and Australia have had official diplomatic relations since 1 March 1940, when Australia established a legation in Washington as one of its first independent postings. Prior to that, Australia had been represented by the British Embassy in Washington, either through a representative of the Australian government or simply by British officials on Australia's behalf. During 1929, Prime Minister Stanley Bruce appointed Herbert Brookes as "Commissioner-General to the United States", with a mandate to promote "Australian achievements in economic, musical, artistic, literary and intellectual fields". However, Brookes was recalled the next year by James Scullin (Bruce's successor), as a cost-saving measure during the Depression. During 1937, Joseph Lyons (Scullin's successor) appointed Keith Officer as a liaison officer posted with the British Embassy, with the diplomatic rank of "Counsellor". Officer continued in the job until February 1940 when he became the charge d'Affaires, pending the arrival of Casey as the first Minister.

First established as a legation directed by an Envoy Extraordinary and Minister Plenipotentiary, on 19 July 1946 the diplomatic representative was promoted to embassy status and the Australian Minister, Frederic Eggleston became the first Ambassador. The job is seen as very desirable, and political appointees are regularly posted. Several distinguished Australians have served as Ambassador to the United States, including a former Prime Minister and Foreign Minister (Kevin Rudd), future Governor-General of Australia (Richard Casey), a future Chief Justice of Australia (Sir Owen Dixon), a future Governor of Tasmania (James Plimsoll), three former federal leaders of the opposition (Andrew Peacock, Kim Beazley and Rudd), and a former Treasurer of Australia (Joe Hockey).

== Office-holders ==
=== Commissioner/Commissioner-General ===
Ordinal	Name	Image	Office	Term start date	Term end date	Time in office	Notes
1	Sir Henry Braddon		Commissioner	19 September 1918	31 July 1919	315 days	
2	Mark Sheldon		Commissioner	31 July 1919	11 September 1924	5 years, 42 days	
3	Sir James Elder		Commissioner	11 September 1924	17 May 1926	1 year, 248 days	
4	Sir Hugh Denison		Commissioner-General	17 May 1926	10 February 1928	1 year, 269 days	
5	Herbert Brookes		Commissioner-General	10 February 1928	23 January 1931	2 years, 347 days	

=== Counsellor/Charge d'Affaires ===
Ordinal	Name	Image	Office	Term start date	Term end date	Time in office	Notes
–	Keith Officer		Australian Counsellor, British Embassy	February 1937	February 1940	3 years, 29 days	
–	Keith Officer		Charge d'Affaires, Australian Legation	February 1940	1 March 1940	3 years, 29 days	

=== Minister/Ambassador ===
Ordinal	Name	Image	Office	Term start date	Term end date	Time in office	Notes
1	Richard Casey		Minister	1 March 1940	1 June 1942	2 years, 92 days	
2	Sir Owen Dixon		Minister	3 June 1942	1 October 1944	2 years, 120 days	
3	Sir Frederic Eggleston		Minister	1 November 1944	19 July 1946	1 year, 308 days	
3	Sir Frederic Eggleston		Ambassador	19 July 1946	5 September 1946	1 year, 308 days	
4	Norman Makin		Ambassador	5 September 1946	1 January 1951	4 years, 118 days	
5	Sir Percy Spender		Ambassador	31 May 1951	1 January 1957	5 years, 215 days	
6	Sir Howard Beale		Ambassador	20 March 1958	1 April 1964	6 years, 12 days	
7	Sir Keith Waller		Ambassador	20 April 1964	1 June 1970	6 years, 42 days	
8	Sir James Plimsoll		Ambassador	8 June 1970	1 January 1973	2 years, 207 days	
9	Sir Patrick Shaw		Ambassador	21 February 1974	27 December 1975	1 year, 309 days	
–	Gordon Noel Upton		Chargé d'affaires	27 December 1975	8 March 1976	72 days	
10	Nick Parkinson		Ambassador	8 January 1976	1 February 1976	24 days	
11	Alan Renouf		Ambassador	9 February 1976	20 May 1979	3 years, 100 days	
–	Robert B. Birch		Chargé d'affaires	20 May 1979	13 November 1979	177 days	
10	Sir Nick Parkinson		Ambassador	13 November 1979	15 July 1982	2 years, 244 days	
–	Geoffrey J. Price		Chargé d'affaires	15 July 1982	16 August 1982	32 days	
12	Sir Bob Cotton		Ambassador	16 August 1982	1 June 1985	2 years, 289 days	
13	Rawdon Dalrymple		Ambassador	26 June 1985	1 April 1989	3 years, 279 days	
14	Michael Cook		Ambassador	20 April 1989	1 August 1993	4 years, 103 days	
15	Dr Don Russell		Ambassador	22 August 1993	1 December 1995	2 years, 101 days	
16	John McCarthy		Ambassador	5 December 1995	1 February 1997	1 year, 58 days	
17	Andrew Peacock		Ambassador	2 February 1997	27 February 1999	2 years, 25 days	
18	Michael Thawley		Ambassador	2 February 2000	1 June 2005	5 years, 119 days	
19	Dennis Richardson		Ambassador	20 June 2005	1 February 2010	4 years, 226 days	
20	Kim Beazley		Ambassador	17 February 2010	22 January 2016	5 years, 339 days	
21	Joe Hockey		Ambassador	29 January 2016	30 January 2020	4 years, 1 day	
22	Arthur Sinodinos	Ambassador Arthur Sinodinos	Ambassador	7 February 2020	20 March 2023	3 years, 41 days	
23	Kevin Rudd	Former PM Kevin Rudd	Ambassador	20 March 2023	31 March 2026	3 years, 11 days	

== Consulates ==
Location	Opened	Consul	Consular district
Consulate-General, Chicago	1971	Chris Elstoft	Illinois, Indiana, Iowa, Kansas, Michigan, Minnesota, Missouri, Nebraska, North Dakota, South Dakota, Wisconsin
Consulate-General, Honolulu	1973	Greg Wilcock	Hawaii, Guam, American Samoa, Northern Mariana Islands, USPACOM
Consulate-General, Houston	1982	Gabrielle Hall	Texas, Arkansas, Oklahoma, Louisiana
Consulate-General, New York	1945	Heather Ridout AO	New York, New Jersey, Pennsylvania, Connecticut, Rhode Island, Massachusetts, Vermont, Maine, New Hampshire, Ohio, Puerto Rico, US Virgin Islands.
Consulate-General, Los Angeles	1971	Tanya Bennett	California (south of the 36N latitude), Alaska, Arizona, Colorado, New Mexico, Nevada (Clark County), Utah
Consulate-General, San Francisco	1946	Chris Ketter	California (north of 36N latitude), Nevada (except Clark County), Oregon, Washington, Idaho, Montana, Wyoming

The Australian Embassy in Washington DC, is responsible for the remaining areas of Alabama, Delaware, District of Columbia, Florida, Georgia, Kentucky, Maryland, Mississippi, North Carolina, South Carolina, Tennessee, Virginia and West Virginia.

From 1993 to August 2012, there existed a Consulate-General in Atlanta, Georgia, which was managed by Austrade. The consulate's closure was due to a realignment of resources "to growing and emerging markets like Mongolia and Colombia." After its closure, the consulate's reporting responsibilities for the states of Alabama, Florida, Georgia, Louisiana, Mississippi, North Carolina and South Carolina were transferred to the Australian Embassy in Washington. From 12 September 1994 to his death on 11 June 2017, there existed an Honorary Consulate in Denver, Colorado, held by Mark O'Regan, an Australian-born Denver realtor and former civil servant in the Territory of Papua New Guinea. From 7 December 1999 to his death on 6 November 2013, the Honorary Consul in Miami, Florida, was Thomas Flynn. Flynn was appointed as an Honorary Member of the Order of Australia (AM) for his service as honorary consul in 2005. Don Slesnick was an Honorary Consul for Florida from 2013. From 2002 to approximately 2006, Len Reid was the Australian Honorary Consul in Seattle. Reid is now Honorary Consul Emeritus.

== Consuls-general ==
=== Atlanta ===
The consulate-general was opened in 1993 under Austrade management. The consulate was closed in August 2012 following an Austrade restructure.

Name	Start of term	End of term	References
Ian Wing	14 September 1993	May 1997	
Geoff Gray	14 August 1997	2000	
David Crook	2000	22 November 2004	
Amanda Hodges	7 January 2005	June 2009	
Duncan Cole	June 2009	31 August 2012	

=== Chicago ===
Originally opened in 1971, the consulate-general was closed in 1993 due to budget constraints after being transferred to Austrade, but re-opened under DFAT in 2001.

Name	Start of term	End of term	References
T. W. Collis	1971	1974	
F. B. Hall	1975	1978	
D. C. Goss	1979	1980	
B. B. Hickey	1981	1985	
Terry McCarthy	1986	1987	
Jeremy Hearder	1988	1990	
Kevin Gates	1991	6 August 1993	
Consulate closed
Ron Harvey	2001	2004	
Bob Charles	2005	2008	
Elizabeth Schick	April 2008	April 2011	
Roger Price	November 2011	31 March 2015	
Michael Wood	1 April 2015	18 January 2019	
David Bushby	18 January 2019	March 2022	
Emma Buckham (acting)	March 2022	December 2023	
Chris Elstoft	December 2023	present	

=== Honolulu ===
Originally opened as a Consulate in January 1973, the posting was upgraded to a Consulate-General on 26 March 1978.

Name	Start of term	End of term	References
David Wadham (Consul)	January 1973	June 1975	
William Rowe (Consul)	June 1975	26 March 1978	
William Rowe MBE	26 March 1978	June 1979	
Brian Meade	June 1979	February 1983	
Bill Fisher	February 1983	April 1987	
Richard Smith	April 1987	August 1989	
Robert Tyson	August 1989	January 1993	
Murray Cobban	January 1993	October 1995	
Colin McDonald	October 1995	May 1998	
Peter Woolcott	May 1998	July 2001	
Paul Robilliard	July 2001	September 2004	
John Quinn	September 2004	August 2007	
David Binns	August 2007	August 2011	
Scott Dewar	August 2011	February 2015	
Jeff Robinson	8 February 2015	22 December 2017	
Jane Hardy	22 December 2017	25 June 2021	
Andrea Gleason	25 June 2021	3 July 2024	
Greg Wilcock	3 July 2024	incumbent	

=== Los Angeles ===
Originally a Trade Commission from 1965, the post was upgraded to a Consulate-General from 3 March 1971 and was closed during a period of budget cuts to Foreign Affairs on 1 July 1976. The consulate reopened in September 1978 and management was transferred from DFAT to Austrade in October 1992. DFAT resumed management from November 1999.

Name	Start of term	End of term	References
A. I. Macrae (Trade Commissioner)	1964	1966	
M. J. Long (Trade Commissioner)	1967	3 March 1971	
Philip Searcy OBE	3 March 1971	September 1975	
Harold Marshall	September 1975	1 July 1976	
Consulate closed
Peter Barbour	September 1978	April 1981	
John McLeay Jr.	April 1981	February 1984	
Basil Teasey	February 1984	June 1988	
John Kelso	June 1988	October 1992	
Colin Hook	October 1992	May 1995	
Robert O'Donovan	June 1995	1997	
Michael Johnson	1997	November 1999	
Allan Rocher	November 1999	November 2002	
John Olsen	November 2002	September 2006	
Innes Willox	September 2006	March 2009	
Chris De Cure OAM	March 2009	July 2012	
Karen Lanyon	July 2012	October 2015	
Chelsey Martin	22 October 2015	2020	
Jane Duke	4 September 2020	12 November 2023	
Tanya Bennett	12 November 2023	date	

=== San Francisco ===
Since 1993, the consulate-general has been managed by Austrade.

Name	Start of term	End of term	References
Edward Smart	July 1946	October 1949	
N. N. Frewin (acting)	October 1949	1952	
Stewart Wolfe Jamieson	June 1952	1955	
Melville Marshall	May 1955	1960	
Bill Cutts	December 1960	1963	
Frederick Homer	February 1963	1966	
Neil Truscott	February 1966	1970	
Roger Dean	April 1970	1974	
John McCredie	August 1974	1977	
Geoffrey Brady	August 1977	1982	
Leslie Sellars	November 1982	1983	
John Melhuish	May 1983	1986	
David Rutter	October 1986	1990	
David Charles	August 1990	September 1993	
John Paul McCaffrey	29 September 1993	May 1995	
Dr Joe Hlubucek	25 May 1995	1998	
Peter Lewis AM	July 1998	October 2002	
Peter Frank	16 October 2002	2005	
David Lawson	2005	June 2009	
Nigel Warren	June 2009	June 2015	
Sally-Ann Watts	June 2015	October 2015	
Chris Oldfield	October 2015	March 2019	
Nick Nichles	March 2019	7 July 2023	
Chris Ketter	7 July 2023	Incumbent	

== See also ==
- Australia–United States relations
- Embassy of Australia, Washington, D.C.
- List of consuls-general of Australia in New York
- Embassy of the United States, Canberra
- List of ambassadors of the United States to Australia
