= Department of Regional Australia, Local Government, Arts and Sport =

Australian Government department, 2011–2013

Department overview
- Formed: 14 December 2011
- Preceding Department: Department of Regional Australia, Regional Development and Local Government Department of the Prime Minister and Cabinet (arts and sport functions)
- Dissolved: 18 September 2013
- Superseding Department: Department of Infrastructure and Regional Development (regional development and local government functions) Attorney-General's Department (arts functions) Department of Health (sport functions).
- Jurisdiction: Commonwealth of Australia
- Employees: 601 (at April 2013)
- Department executive: Glenys Beauchamp, Secretary
- Child agencies: Australian Sports Anti-Doping Authority; National Capital Authority; Australia Council for the Arts; Australian Film, Television and Radio School; Australian National Maritime Museum; Australian Sports Commission; Australian Institute of Sport; National Film and Sound Archive; National Gallery of Australia; National Library of Australia; National Museum of Australia; Screen Australia
- Website: regional.gov.au

The Department of Regional Australia, Local Government, Arts and Sport was an Australian government department. It was formed in December 2011, absorbing the former Department of Regional Australia, Regional Development and Local Government along with Arts and Sport functions from the Department of the Prime Minister and Cabinet. The department was abolished in September 2013 with its functions moved to other Australian Government departments.

== Scope ==
Information about the department's functions and government funding allocation could be found in the Administrative Arrangements Orders (AAOs), the annual Portfolio Budget Statements, in the department's annual reports and on the departmental website.

According to the AAO made on 14 December 2011, the department dealt with:

- Administration of the Jervis Bay Territory, the Territory of Cocos (Keeling) Islands, the Territory of Christmas Island, the Coral Sea Islands Territory, the Territory of Ashmore and Cartier Islands, and of Commonwealth responsibilities on Norfolk Island
- Constitutional development of the Northern Territory
- Constitutional development of the Australian Capital Territory
- Delivery of regional and rural specific services
- Planning and land management in the Australian Capital Territory
- Regional development
- Matters relating to local government
- Regional Australia policy and co-ordination
- Support for ministers and parliamentary secretaries with regional responsibilities
- Cultural affairs, including movable cultural heritage and support for the arts
- Sport and recreation
- Management of government records
- Old Parliament House

Subsequent AAOs issued on 9 February 2012 and 16 May 2013 omitted mention of "Old Parliament House" and "Support for ministers and parliamentary secretaries with regional responsibilities". The February 2012 and May 2013 AAOs also replaced the words "delivery of regional and rural specific services" with "delivery of regional and territory specific services and programs" and the words "regional Australia policy and co-ordination" with "regional policy and co-ordination".

== Intended outcomes ==
The department worked to help the Government of the day achieve its policy objectives by contributing to, and reporting against four key outcomes. The 2011–12 departmental annual report (which was the only annual report released by the department during its short period of operation) identified the four outcomes as:

1. Coordinated community infrastructure in rural, regional and local government areas through financial assistance.
2. Good governance in the Australian territories through the maintenance and improvement of the overarching legislative framework for self-governing territories, and laws and services for the non-self-governing territories.
3. Participation in, and access to, Australia's arts and culture through developing and supporting cultural expression.
4. Improved opportunities for community participation in sport and recreation, and excellence in high-performance athletes, including investment in sport infrastructure and events, research and international cooperation.

== Structure ==
The department was administered by Australian public servants who were responsible to the Minister for Sport, the Minister for the Arts, or the minister and parliamentary secretary responsible for regional Australia and local government (given various titles during the life of the department).

The department's staff were headed by an executive group comprising the departmental Secretary, Ms Glenys Beauchamp PSM, and four deputy secretaries. According to an estimate in the Australian Government Budget Papers, average staffing levels in the department during 2012-13 were 552, making it the second smallest of 20 portfolio departments that year. Staff were located at 23 offices around Australia. As at June 2012, 68 per cent of departmental staff were female.

Ministers and parliamentary secretaries for the Department of Regional Australia, Local Government, Arts and Sport
Start date	End date	Ministerial title	Minister	Ref.
14 Dec 2011	4 Feb 2013	Minister for Regional Australia, Regional Development and Local Government; Minister for the Arts	Simon Crean	
14 Dec 2011	5 Mar 2012	Minister for Sport	Mark Arbib	
5 Mar 2012	3 Jul 2013	Minister for Sport	Kate Lundy	
25 Mar 2013	3 Jul 2013	Minister for Regional Development and Local Government	Anthony Albanese	
25 Mar 2013	3 Jul 2013	Minister for Regional Services, Local Communities and Territories	Catherine King	
3 Jul 2013	18 Sep 2013	Minister for Regional Australia, Local Government and Territories	Catherine King	
25 Mar 2013	18 Sep 2013	Minister for the Arts	Tony Burke	
3 Jul 2013	18 Sep 2013	Minister for Sport	Don Farrell	
3 Jul 2013	18 Sep 2013	Minister for Regional Development	Sharon Bird	
25 Mar 2013	18 Sep 2013	Parliamentary Secretary for the Arts	Michael Danby	
