= 1990 Australia Day Honours =

The 1990 Australia Day Honours are appointments to various orders and honours to recognise and reward good works by Australian citizens. The list was announced on 26 January 1990 by the Governor General of Australia, Bill Hayden.

The Australia Day Honours are the first of the two major annual honours lists, the first announced to coincide with Australia Day (26 January), with the other being the Queen's Birthday Honours, which are announced on the second Monday in June.

† indicates an award given posthumously.

== Order of Australia ==
=== Companion (AC) ===
==== General Division ====
Recipient	Citation	Notes
Sir William Archer Gunn, KBE CMG	For service to primary industry	
Professor Sir John Carew Eccles	For service to science, particularly in the field of neurophysiology	
The Honourable Dr Thomas Weetman Smith, QC	For service to the law and to legal institutions	
Sidney Baillieu Myer	For service to business and commerce, to government and to the community	

=== Officers (AO) ===
==== General Division ====
Recipient	Citation	Notes
Lewis Barrett, OBE	For service to banking and accounting	
Dr Kevin Bleasel	For service to medicine, particularly in the field of neurosurgery	
Allan Robert Border, AM	For service to the sport of cricket	
Professor Bettina Cass	For service to social security policy and women's affairs	
William Harold Clough, OBE	For service to engineering and to the construction industry	
Michael John Cook	For service to the public service	
Professor David Miles Danks	For service to medicine, particularly in the field of paediatrics and birth defects	
William Duncan Ferris	For service to international trade and to industry	
The Honourable Francis Robert Fisher	For service to the law and to education	
Ronald Gordon Fry, MBE	For service to industrial relations	
John Gandel	For service to business, commerce and to the community	
Rosemary Goldie	For service to religion and to international relations	
Trevor William Haines	For public service	
Dr George Vincent Hall	For service to medicine, particularly as a cardiologist	
Ken Robert Handley, QC	For service to the law and to religion	
Professor William Samuel Calhoun Hare	For service to medicine, particularly in the field of radiology	
Peter Dunstan Hastings†	For service to journalism	
Professor John Basil Hennessy	For service to archaeology and to international relations	
Professor Harry Payne Heseltine	For service to education particularly in the field of Australian literature	
Professor Phillip William Hughes	For service to education	
The Honourable Ralph James Dunnett Hunt	For service to the Australian Parliament	
Daryl Sanders Jackson	For service to architecture	
The Honourable Mr Justice William Kaye, QC	For service to the law	
Dr Michael Stockton Keating	For public service	
Neal Francis Kent	For public service and service to transport	
Professor Paul Ivan Korner	For service to medicine, particularly in the field of research	
Colin John Lanceley	For service to art, particularly as a painter and sculptor	
Dr Peter Gordon Livingstone	For public service	
George Alfred Lloyd, OBE	For service to aviation and to international relations	
Robert Bernard Maybury	For service to finance, particularly through the building society movement	
Professor Isabel McBryde	For service to education, particularly in the field of Australian prehistory	
Roderick Duncan McLeod	For service to primary industry, particularly grain growing	
Dr Frank Harland Mills	For service to medicine, particularly in the field of cardiothoracic surgery	
Professor Gerald White Milton	For service to medicine, particularly in the field of malignant melanoma	
Grevor Chilton Molyneux, OBE	For service to the community, particularly in the field of health administration and fund raising	
Geoffrey Penwill Parsons, OBE	For service to music	
The Most Reverend Eric Gerard Perkins	For service to religion and to social welfare	
Peter Joshua Sculthorpe, OBE	For service to music	
The Honourable Lindsay Hamilton Simpson Thompson, CMG	For service to government and politics and to the Victorian parliament	
Elizabeth Catherine Usher	For service as a speech therapist to people with disabilities	
His Honour Chief Judge Glenn Royce Donal Waldron	For service to the law	
Nancy-Bird Walton, OBE	For service to aviation, particularly the participation of women in aviation	
John Yeowart	For service to the coal mining industry	
The Honourable Michael Jerome Young	For service to the Australian parliament	

==== Military Division ====
Branch	Recipient	Citation	Notes
Navy	Rear Admiral David Guy Holthouse	For service to the Royal Australian Navy as the Assistant Chief of Naval Staff (Logistics)	
Navy	Commodore Peter Clifford Mitchell AM	For service to the Royal Australian Navy, particularly as the Anzac Ship Project Director	
Army	Major General Brian William Howard AM MC	For service to the Australian Army as Director General, Natural Disasters Organisation	
Army	Major General John David Keldie	For service to the Australian Army, in particular as Commander 2nd Division	
Air Force	Air Vice-Marshal Graham Wallace Neil	For service to the Royal Australian Air Force as Assistant Chief of the Air Staff — Personnel	
Air Force	Air Vice-Marshal Richard John Bomball	For service to the Royal Australian Air Force as Assistant Chief of the Air Staff Development	

=== Member (AM) ===
==== General Division ====
Recipient	Citation	Notes
Reverend Neil William Adcock	For service to religion and the community	
Albert Arlen	For service to music and the performing arts	
Peter Charles Tustin Armytage	For service to horseracing as an administrator and owner	
Frank Arok	For service to soccer, particularly as the Australian national coach	
Yvonne Jean Bain	For service to women's affairs, particularly through the National Council of Women	
Melvie May Banks	For service to the hairdressing industry and to the community	
Robert Graeme Barnard	For service to music, particularly jazz	
Robert Alexander Barter	For service to medicine, particularly in the field of pathology	
Archie Barton	For service to Aboriginal welfare and land rights	
Henry Trevor Bennett	For service to the public service, particularly in the field of business law	
Frank Lincoln Bett	For service to the public service	
Douglas Ronald Birch	For service to industrial relations	
Stanley Aloysius Bitmead	For service to the trade union movement	
Wing Cdr Richard John Bluck	For service to the community through the St John Ambulance and to youth	
John Francis Boultbee	For service to the sport of rowing as an administrator	
Thomas Ray Bradley	For service to medical science and technology, particularly in the field of cell biology	
Anne Mary Brennan	For service to social work	
Elizabeth Annita Campbell	For service to the community, particularly to youth through the Peer Support Foundation	
Kathleen Joan Campbell	For service to adult education	
Emeritus Professor Arthur Frederick Cobbold, OBE	For service to medicine, particularly in the fields of administration and medical education	
John Cole	For service to the Australian fishing industry	
Aileen Coleman	For service to international relations, particularly as a medical missionary in Jordan	
Rabbi Doctor Shalom Coleman, CBE	For service to religion and to the community	
Geoffrey Page Cook	For service to the construction industry and to the community	
Ian Cooper	For service to music education	
Douglas Ward Cunliffe	For service to the science and technology, particularly through the Anglo-Australian Telescope project	
Kenneth George Cunningham	For service to the media, particularly as a sporting broadcaster	
Associate Professor Bruce Walker Davis	For service to heritage and to conservation	
Walter Johannes Augustinus De Veer, MBE	For service to the Dutch community, multicultural broadcasting and to sport	
David John Dewhurst	For service to biomedical engineering for people with disabilities	
Wandrina Johanna Woutrina Douglas Broers	For service to the Dutch community, particularly through the fostering of the language and culture	
David Donn Eagleson	For public service	
Stewart Geoffrey East	For service to business, commerce and to the community	
Alan Edmund William Edwards, MBE	For service to the performing arts	
Bruce Harrison Edwards	For service to accountancy	
Peter Colin Roy Edwards	For service to conservation and the environment and to the community	
Janet Lucile Elder	For service to thoracic medicine and to the community	
Emeritus Professor Ralph Warren Victor Elliott	For service to the community and to education	
Averil Fink, MBE	For service to the welfare of the aged	
Neville Horner Fletcher	For service to science, particularly in the field of applied physics	
Joseph Robert Emmott Fraser	For service to medicine, particularly in the field of rheumatic diseases	
Max Gillies	For service to the performing arts	
Samuel Mark Goldbloom	For service to the community particularly through the peace movement	
Ian John Gollings	For service to veterans affairs	
Patricia June Goodheart	For service to the Girl Guide Association and to the community	
Desmond John Gerald Griffin	For service to natural history, particularly through the Australian Museum	
Elisabeth Ann Harricks	For service to people with impaired hearing	
Beryl Sidney Haynes	For service to people with physical disabilities, particularly in the field of physiotherapy	
Thomas Clement Hayson	For service to business and commerce	
The Honourable Charles Murray Hill	For service to the South Australian parliament and to the community	
Peter Phillip Hitchcock	For service to conservation and the environment	
Harold William Holowell	For service to the trade union movement	
Elspeth Phyllis Hope-Johnstone	For service to the art, to early childhood education and to public broadcasting	
Anthony Martin Houen	For service to people with disabilities, particularly those with impaired hearing	
Donald James Hughes	For service to business and to industry, particularly the food industry	
William Arthur Charles Hughes	For service to the trade union movement	
Ronald William John Robinson James, MBE	For service to the community	
Leslie Arthur Jeckeln	For service to the New South Wales parliament as an administrative officer	
John Frederick Jenkinson	For service to children with physical disabilities	
The Honourable Lawrence Borthwick Kelly	For service to the New South Wales Parliament and to the community	
Shirley Marjorie Kidd	For service to nursing	
Evelyn Koshnitsky, BEM	For service to chess	
Kurt Albert Lance	For service to skiing	
John Landerer	For service to the legal profession, particularly in the field of legal education, and to the community	
Alderman Michael Lardelli	For service to local government and to the community	
Clive Ditton Lee	For service to amateur athletics	
Beryl Eileen Linn	For service to religion and to education	
Reginald Marsh	For public service and service to the community	
William Ian McCullough	For public service	
Arthur Gregory McDonald	For service to the community and to industry	
Roderick Gardner McEwin	For service to medical administration	
Roderick Hamilton McGeoch	For service to the law and to the community	
Joseph Daniel McGinness	For service to the Aboriginal community	
Robert Ian McNamara	For service to people with disabilities	
Donald Frederick Nicholls	For public service	
Nicholas John Nicolaides	For service to medicine, particularly in the field of pathology	
David Brian O'Connor	For service to the Australian bicentennial celebrations	
Bruce Lefroy Okely	For public service	
John Bramston Russell Oldham	For service to landscape architecture	
Emeritus Professor Rex Charles Olsson	For service to education, particularly in the field of finance and accounting	
Warren George Osmond, OBE	For service to veterans	
William Abernethy Park, CBE	For service to education, to finance and the community	
Ian Wilson Paterson	For service to education	
Mervin George Phillips	For service to the community and to primary industry	
Professor Douglas William Piper	For service to medical education and medical research, particularly in the field of gastroenterology	
Judith Anne Porter	For service to nursing	
The Reverend Dr Gordon George Powell	For service to religious broadcasting and to alcoholics	
Guenter Prass	For service to the wine industry	
John Scott Rowe	For public service	
George Romano Santoro	For service to medical administration and to the Italian community	
Sydney Kitchener Saul	For service to veterans	
Frederick Charles Shield	For service to the finance industry, particularly through the building society movement	
Georgia Shield	For service to the community, particularly those suffering emotional and mental illness	
Commander Michael Thomas Edward Shotter, RAN	For service to the Australian bicentennial celebrations	
John Maslin Sibly	For service to conservation, particularly in the field of urban planning	
Hari Narayan Sinha	For service to science and technology and to Australian-Indian relations	
John Harman Slade	For service to medicine, particularly in the field of ophthalmology	
George Hermon Slade	For service to horticulture, particularly the culture of orchids	
Margaret Slattery, MBE	For service to education and to the community	
David Henry Solomon	For service to science and technology, particularly in the field of polymer chemistry	
Professor Margaret Anne Ganley Somerville	For service to the law and to bioethics	
The Reverend Herbert Rhead Stevens	For service to education	
Leslie Allan Swinstead	For service to industrial relations and to the community	
Lady Viola Wilson Tait	For service to the performing arts	
Michael John Talberg	For service to the community	
Kathleen Joan Taperell	For public service	
Peggy Stuart Taylor	For service to nursing, particularly in the field of neo-natal care	
Peter Taylor, OBE	For service to the community, particularly in the field of care for the aged and infirm	
Lurline Tillett	For service to children with disabilities, particularly autistic children	
George Henry King Tippett	For service to international relations in the field of medicine	
Arthur Michael Douglas Tooth	For service to primary industry	
Harry Oscar Triguboff	For service to building and construction and for philanthropy	
Patricia Ann Turner	For public service	
Frederic Boyd Turner	For service to people with physical disabilities	
Doron Ur	For service to the community, particularly in the field of multicultural affairs	
Roy Henry Wallace	For service to education	
Roderick John Wallace	For public service, particularly to the conservation of Australian film archives	
Patricia Ward	For service to librarianship	
Dorothy Ann Wentworth	For service to the community, particularly women's affairs	
Ian Sydney Wilson	For service to education, particularly through parent participation	
Alexander Walter Young, OBE	For service to the community	

==== Military Division ====
Branch	Recipient	Citation	Notes
Navy	Captain Rupert Anthony Christie RAN	For service to the Royal Australian Navy as the Director of Surface Warfare and Command and Control	
Navy	Commodore Ian Fletcher Holmes RAN	For service to the Royal Australian Navy as the Director General Fleet Maintenance	
Navy	Commodore Robin Nyren Partington RAN	For service to the Royal Australian Navy as the Naval Officer Commanding North Australia Area	
Navy	Lieutenant Commander Bryan Chisholm Rowland RFD, RD, RANR	For service to the Royal Australian Navy as Officer-in-Charge of the Naval Control of Shipping Training Cell	
Army	Colonel Richard Palmer Knox	For service to the Australian Army as Director of Financial and Management Support	
Army	Lieutenant Colonel William Julian Andrew Mellor	For service to the Australian Army as Commanding Officer of the 5th Aviation Regiment	
Army	Brigadier Errold Frederick Pfitzner	For service to the Australian Army as the Chief of Staff Joint Exercise Planning Staff	
Army	Lieutenant Colonel Peter Neville Rule RFD	For service to the Australian Army as Commanding Officer Queensland Agricultural College Training Unit	
Army	Brigadier George Thomas Salmon	For service to the Australian Army in the field of new capital equipment procurement	
Army	Lieutenant Colonel Ian Malcolm Stewart	For service to the Australian Army as Staff Officer Grade One Plans, Headquarters Land Command Australia	
Army	Major Ronald James Tattersall	For service to the Australian Army as an administrative staff officer in Army Office, Canberra	
Army	Major Gerald Anthony Thurnwald	For service to the Australian Army as Officer Commanding 19th Dental Unit	
Air Force	Wing Commander Michael Brendon Birks	For service to the Royal Australian Air Force as Commanding Officer No 34 Squadron, Fairbairn ACT	
Air Force	Air Commodore Colin Edward Bradford	For service to the Royal Australian Air Force as Director of Personnel Officers	
Air Force	Flight Lieutenant David John Green	For service to the Royal Australian Air Force as an instructor in the Nuclear, Biological and Chemical Defence Wing at the Army School of Military Engineering	
Air Force	Wing Commander Jonathan Scott Hamwood	For service to the Royal Australian Air Force as Commanding Officer, Base Squadron, Tindal	
Air Force	Wing Commander Allan Grant (Angus) Houston	For service to the Royal Australian Air Force as Commanding Officer No 9 Squadron and subsequently Officer Commanding A Squadron, 5th Aviation Regiment	
Air Force	Group Captain James Frederick George Kennedy	For service to the Royal Australian Air Force as the facilities manager of the RAAF Base Tindal development project	
Air Force	Squadron Leader Warren James Ludwig	For service to the Royal Australian Air Force as the tactical co-ordinator, Standards and Training Office No 10 Squadron, Edinburgh, South Australia	

=== Medal (OAM) ===
==== General Division ====
Recipient	Citation	Notes
Beatrice Ellen Abell	For service to the community, particularly through the Anglican Home Mission Society	
Toula Andrikopoulos	For service to the Greek community	
Eftychia Antoniou	For service to the Greek community	
George Charles Colville Armstrong	For service to the community and veterans	
Ian Maxwell Leslie Armstrong	For service to the community, particularly in the field of community history	
Bernard Clarence Badger	For service to veterans	
Joan Margaret Banks	For service to health education and women's affairs	
Cedric Anthony Beverly Baxter	For service to the sport of badminton.	
Henry Robert Beak	For service to the community and local government	
Michael Anthony Beckwith	For service to the community and local government	
Donald Fyfe Bell	For service to amateur athletics and to the community	
Reginald John Bennett	For service to the community	
Eileen Bennett	For service to community health and to international relations	
Kenneth John Maynard Bilston	For service to engineering	
Commander Alexander Duncan Black	For service to local government	
Patrick Finbar Boland	For service to veterans	
Alice Clifford Bott	For service to the community	
Raynor Richard Bott	For service to veterans	
Francis Walter Bourke	For service to the community and sport	
Henry Keith Bowler	For service to the sport of table tennis	
Fay Catherine Bray	For service to the community and youth	
George James Francis Breen	For service to veterans	
Valerie Jean Broad	For service to the community and people with physical disabilities	
Wilfred Brooks	For service to the Public Service	
Betsy Caroline Brown	For service to music and education	
Christine Penelope Brune	For service to international relations through International Children's Aid	
Neita Joyce Burkill	For service to the community	
Joseph Burton	For service to the community	
Donald Campbell	For service to the sport of soccer, particularly as a referee	
Lt Cdr Kenneth Henry Cartwright	For service to the sailing and youth	
John Aloysius Cavanagh	For services to the community	
Doris Winifred Chalmers	For services to the welfare of the aged	
George Jira Chaloupka	For services to Aboriginal art and culture	
Antony Erling Charlton	For service to the community	
Margaret Jean Chase	For service to early childhood education	
Judith Olive Chisholm	For service to Aboriginal health and welfare	
Michael Nicholas Churkin	For service to the Russian community	
Alan Clarkson	For service to the media as a sports journalist	
David Major Cody BEM	For service to animal welfare, particularly at Taronga Park Zoo	
Eileen Bernice Coe	For service to nursing	
Albert Thomas Cooper	For service to the Public Service	
Margaret Cooper	For service to the disabled	
Ernest George Cope	For service to the community and to youth	
Charles Rowland Cornall	For service to community health, particularly to hospital administration	
Arthur Richard Cox	For service to veterans	
Anthony John Culnane	For service to the community	
Ailsa Margaret Curtis	For service to the education of children with intellectual disabilities	
Councillor William Mayfield Dane	For service to the community and local government	
Joan Dare	For service to the welfare of the aged	
Aline Frances Darke	For service to the community	
Janet Lancaster Darling	For service to international relations and to the environment	
Alan Darcy Darlington	For service to veterans	
Mijo Ivan Darveniza	For service to the community, particularly through the Victorian Ambulance Service	
Dr Joseph Ivan Davis	For service to sports medicine and the community	
Vincent Gerard Davis	For service to community welfare, particularly through the St Vincent de Paul Society	
Johannes Cornelius Jacobus De Jong	For service to martial arts	
Arthur Edward Denison	For service to the baking industry	
Maria Dnistrjanski	For service to the Ukrainian community	
Charles Francis Doyle	For service to junior basketball	
Mary Frances Wiseman Duchesne	For service to ballet	
Sister Ruta Dzenis	For service to nursing and to people with intellectual disabilities	
Paul Barcroft Eccles	For service to the Public Service	
Brother Boyd John Egan	For service to the community and to education	
The Honourable Dr Roger August Alfred Faes De Bryon Faes	For service to community health and to the New South Wales Parliament	
Clifford Wilmot Farmer	For service to the community	
Andrew Fleming	For service to the sport of judo	
Deaconess Doris Ellen Fletcher	For service to the community, particularly in the field of migrant assistance	
William James Frecklington	For service to coach building and craftsmanship	
William Henry Charles Fullwood	For service to the community	
Alderman Graham Charles Gard	For service to local government	
Guerin Gardner	For service to the sport of canoeing	
Brian Alan Glencross	For service to hockey	
John Douglas Gordon	For service to music, particularly as a carillonist	
Councillor George Albert Gould	For service to local government and to the community	
Lyall Lintott Green	For service to the community	
Helen Rhoda Greentree	For service to the community, particularly to youth	
Vladislav Gregurek	For service to the tourist and hospitality industry	
Nicanora Growns	For service to the Filipino community	
Thomas Philip Grundy	For service to education and multicultural affairs	
Gordon Talbot Gunn	For service to the arts, particularly as a pipe organ builder and player	
Jack Vernon Guye	For service to local government and to the community	
John Edmond Haddad	For service to the community.	
Gregory Francis Hamilton	For service to people with hearing and visual disabilities	
Peter Keith Harten	For service to the Trade Union movement	
Lillian Marjorie Florence Hawke	For service to the community	
John Graham Hawley	For service to local government and to the community	
Pamela Moira Hayes	For service to nursing and midwifery education	
Bernhard Elizabeth Heiden	For service to lawn bowls and to youth	
Maria Heymans	For service to art	
Frederick Harley Hillier MBE	For service to veterans	
Eric Hind	For service to local government and to the community	
Joan Rita Hoffman	For service to people with intellectual disabilities	
Earle Samuel Hoffman	For service to the Jewish community	
Frederic Keith Davenport Howard	For service to the community	
Henry Humphris-Clark	For service to surf life saving	
Peter John Hunter	For service to photography.	
Kevin Robert Hutchinson	For service to the community particularly through the restoration of historic river boats.	
Francis Patrick Aloysius Hyde MBE	For service to Rugby League football and to the media.	
Ian Lindsay Irwin	For service to the Australian bicentennial celebrations, particularly through the Castrol World Car Rally.	
William George Jameson	For service to people with intellectual disabilities.	
Margaret Rose Jobson	For service to the welfare for the aged.	
Major Elizabeth Pearl Johnson	For service to community welfare, particularly through the Salvation Army.	
Councillor Thomas Edward Johnston	For service to local government and to the community.	
Thomas Henry Jones	For service to the Western Australian Parliament, to the trade union movement and to the welfare of the elderly.	
Fiorenza Jones	For service to the Italian community.	
Paraskevas Perry Kailis	For service to the Greek community.	
Gwen Kemmis MBE	For service to people with intellectual disabilities	
Marjory Kent	For service to the Royal Society for the Prevention of Cruelty to Animals.	
Enid Ethel Kerr	For service to social welfare, particularly through Life Line.	
Noel George Langley	For service to soccer, particularly as a junior coach.	
Ruth Isobel Langley	For service to community health, particularly through the Asthma Foundation of South Australia	
Barry Michael Lee	For service to industry, particularly in the area of fire protection	
John Charles Lewis-Driver	For service to veterans	
Marcus Linton	For active involvement in several community groups including the Commando Association (since 1960); Norman Park Methodist Church, Coorparoo and District RSL, Salvation Army Red Shield Appeal; and Blue Nursing Appeals	
Raymond Cecil James Little	For service to cricket administration	
Donald George Macdonald	For service to horticulture	
Nancy Florence MacIvor	For service to the community	
John Dight Mackay	For service to local government and to the community	
Bruce Malcolm Mackie	For service to the welfare of the aged and to Legacy	
Dr Sheena Dawson MacLeod	For public service, particularly to public health	
Francis George Makepeace	For service to the community	
Muriel Doreen Markey	For service to the community	
Dr Betty Jean Harvard Marks	For service to medicine and to the community	
Pamela Howard Marsh	For service to physiotherapy	
Colonel John Henry Marsh MBE	For service to the community	
Richard Paul Marshall	For public service.	
Ruth Lena Mataitis	For service to migrant assistance	
Brenda Olive Matthews	For service to the arts, particularly to porcelain painting	
Janice Mary May	For service to people with intellectual disabilities	
Louis Benedict Joseph McGovern	For service to education	
Margaret Edna McGregor	For service to the community, particularly to the foster grandparent scheme	
William John McKenzie	For service to local government and to the community	
Stanley Bruce McKenzie	For service to the community	
Deaconess Mavis Jean McKinnon	For service to religion	
Donald McKnight	For service to ice skating	
Pamela Mary McLean	For service to surf life saving	
Cedric Haig McLean	For service to scouting	
Rae McLintock	For service to education	
David George McQuitty	For public service	
Roberta McRae	For service to migrant assistance	
Abraham Charles Mellick	For service to the community	
Mary Merlin	For service to Aboriginal welfare and to the community	
Jack Howard Mills	For public service	
John William Mills	For service to the community and to veterans	
Ursula Merle Modder	For public service, particularly to early childhood education	
Sister Marie Therese Morganti	For service to education	
Thelma Isobel Morris	For service to people with intellectual disabilities	
Lillian May Mouatt	For service to people with intellectual disabilities	
John Robert Moulton	For service to the Australian Bicentennial celebrations, particularly the Sydney Australia Day celebrations and fireworks display	
Kevin Lesley Myers	For service to life saving	
Alexander Gilmour Nason MBE	For service to the agricultural show movement	
Mary Isabel Catherine Newman	For service to the retail fashion industry	
Leslie Gilbert Newton	For service to veterinary science and to the community	
Clare Mary O'Connor	For service to the community	
Edward (Terry) Oppy	For service to the community and to soccer	
Dean (Rocky) Page	For service to the community and to country music	
Graeme Ogilvy Paton DFC	For service to the community	
Harold Peden	For service to the Trade Union movement	
Angela Maria Pedicini	For service to the community	
Neville Bruce Perrin	For service to the welfare of the aged	
John Frederick Peters	For service to judo	
William Robert Pfitzner	For service to the community	
Rita Mavis Phillips	For service to nursing	
Emily Elizabeth Powell	For service to the community, particularly through the Bankstown Hospital Auxiliary	
Joan Eleanor Prior	For service to the community and to music	
James Weir Quaite	For service to hockey	
Anthony Rafty	For service to the media as a cartoonist	
Allan Walter Ransley	For service to the community	
Garry Edward Richards	For service to youth	
Dorothy Richards	For service to the arts, particularly for the Parliament House Embroidery	
Paddy Roe	For service to Aboriginal welfare	
Mary Beatrice Russell	For service to the Girl Guides Association	
Anthony Joseph Ryan	For service to the Australian Wool Corporation as a senior shearing coach	
Lucy Ruby Saini	For service to the community	
Kenneth William Sandoe	For service to the community	
Geza Francis Kim Santow	For service to the community	
Herbert Edward Scotford	For service to the community, to arts and to the media	
Francis Desmond Seton	For service to the baking industry	
Councillor George Edward Shill	For service to local government and to the community	
Pinhkham Simmalavong	For service to the Lao/Indo-Chinese community	
Ross Lincoln Simpson DFC	For service to the community	
Peter Charles Sims	For service to conservation and to the environment	
Margaret Jane Sivyer	For service to the community	
Bernard Zdzislaw Skarbek	For service to the Polish community	
Henry Robert Slaney	For service to primary industry	
Winifred Bullot Smith	For service to nursing education	
Alan Samuel Smith	For service to local government	
Richard Gordon Spinks	For service to swimming, particularly rehabilitative hydrotherapy	
Miroslav Srdarov	For service to the Yugoslav community and to local government	
Arthur Exley Stephenson	For service to primary industry, and to road safety through the Royal Automobile Club of Queensland	
Neil Stephen Sullivan	For service to local government and to the community	
Stephen James Tazewell	For service to the community, to conservation and to local history	
David Albert Thompson	For service to Legacy	
Sybil Thornton	For service to people with disabilities	
Margaret Ruth Tindale	For service to conservation and the environment	
David Morgan Tuckerman	For service to the community	
Dr Raoul De Crespigny Tunbridge	For service to medicine and to the Victorian State Disaster Plan	
Shirley Wrathall Twist	For service to the community	
Ignatius William Tyquin	For service to Rugby League football	
Jean Azile van Nooten BEM	For service to children with visual and hearing disabilities	
Georgina Alma Venville	For service to the community and to local government	
Councillor Robert Gardner Walker	For service to primary industry, particularly sheep breeding	
Geoffrey Roy Walker	For public service	
Maureen Anne Walsh	For service to the community	
Nicholas Anthony Ronald Waterlow	For service to the arts	
Alfred Thomas Webb	For service to the community, particularly through the United Hospital Auxiliaries	
Annie Isabel Wellington	For service to the community	
John Douglas Frederick West	For service to the Victoria State Emergency Service	
George Albert Westcott BEM	For service to the community	
James Abbot McNeil Whistler	For service to the community and to local government	
Dudley Lyle Whittington	For service to commerce and property development	
Richard James Whittington	For public service	
Walter Frederick Widdeson	For service to the West Australian Axemen's League	
Kenneth Arthur Williams	For service to lawn bowls	
Betty Louise Reading Willis	For service to the Returned Services League Women's Auxiliaries	
Jack Reginald Willis	For service to veterans	
Percy Ross Wills	For service to veterans	
Arthur Frank Wilson	For service to the community	
Hazel Mary Wilson	For service to Aboriginal support services	
Robert Irving Winter-Irving	For service to Nagambie Bush Nursing Hospital	
William Louis Wonder	For service to youth and to international relations	
Gerald Albert William Worsell	For service to the Sports Union of the University of New England	
Alan James Wright	For service to the community	
Patricia Carrie Wright	For service to swimming	
Malcolm John Yeo RFD*	For service to education and aviation training for young people	
Evelyn Eleanor Young	For service to the community and to women's affairs	
John Fitzgerald Yuncken	For service to maritime history	

==== Military Division ====
Branch	Recipient	Citation	Notes
Navy	Chief Petty Officer Frederick Ian Baker	For service to the Royal Australian Navy, particularly in the maintenance of Guided Missile Destroyers	
Navy	Lieutenant Peter John Dermot Mitchell	For service to the Royal Australian Navy as the Senior Marine Technical Hull Sailor in HMAS Success	
Navy	Warrant Officer Michael John Stubbs	For service to the Royal Australian Navy as the Administrative Staff Officer at the Supply School in HMAS Cerberus	
Navy	Chief Petty Officer Peter Mark Tyler	For service to the Royal Australian Navy, particularly as Staff Officer Shipborne Lifesaving and Survival Equipment to the Directorate of Naval User Requirements	
Army	Warrant Officer Class One Peter James Bruce	For service to the Australian Army as Regimental Sergeant Major of 8th/12th Medium Regiment	
Army	Warrant Officer Class One Russell Don Campbell	For service to the Australian Army as RSM of 8th Brigade	
Army	Warrant Officer Class One Graham William Docksey	For service to the Australian Army as the RSM of Logistic Command	
Army	Warrant Officer Class One Roger Paul Gillis	For service to the Australian Army in the field of Electronic Warfare	
Army	Warrant Officer Class One Bernard John Johnson	For service to the Australian Army as Squadron Sergeant Major 103rd Signal Squadron	
Army	Warrant Officer Class One Kenneth Norman Johnston	For service to the Australian Army as Regimental Sergeant Major of Land Command Battle School	
Army	Warrant Officer Class One Alan Raymond Kelb	For service to the Australian Army in the field of apprentice training	
Army	Warrant Officer Class One David Meehan	For service to the Australian Army in the field of training	
Army	Warrant Officer Class Two Roger Sidney William Payne	For service to the Australian Army as Supervisor Physical Training at the Infantry Centre	
Army	Warrant Officer Class One Shane Bradley Purdon	For service to the Australian Army as the Warrant Officer Supervisor, Construction with Regional Engineer Liverpool	
Army	Warrant Officer Class One Clem William Russell	For service to the Australian Army as Regimental Sergeant Major of the 31st Battalion, the Royal Queensland Regiment	
Army	Warrant Officer Class One Keith Wayne Spence	For service to the Australian Army as a Training Development Warrant Officer at the Royal Australian Army Ordnance Corps Centre, Directorate of Personal Computing, Personnel Branch, Department of Defence (Army Office)	
Army	Captain Anthony Charles Turner	For service to the Australian Army in the field of training	
Army	Warrant Officer Class Two Clarence Arthur Whitehorn	For service to the Australian Army in the field of communications and cryptographic accounting	
Air Force	Flight Sergeant Joseph Anthony	For service to the RAAF as a technician with the Aircraft Engineering Division at HQ Support Command	
Air Force	Warrant Officer Garry Edward Eldridge	For service to the RAAF as the technical supervisor at No 114 Mobile Control and Reporting Unit	
Air Force	Flight Sergeant Gary Edward Glazier	For service to the RAAF in the Technical Airmen Manning Cell, Directorate of Personnel Airmen	
Air Force	Warrant Officer John Murray Hansen	For service to the RAAF as the Senior Non-Commissioned Officer in Charge of No.2 Airfield Defence Squadron, RAAF Base Amberley	
Air Force	Flight Sergeant Alexander James McCabe	For service to the RAAF as Assistant Caterer, Base Support Wing, Darwin	
Air Force	Pilot Officer David James McCann	For service to the RAAF as a Load-Master Instructor at No.5 Squadron, RAAF Base, Fairbairn	
