= Mark Paterson (public servant) =

Australian public servant

Mark Paterson AO FRSN

Secretary of the Department of Industry, Tourism and Resources
- In office 18 January 2002 – 3 December 2007

Secretary of the Department of Innovation, Industry, Science and Research
- In office 3 December 2007 – 2011

Personal details
- Born: Mark Ian Paterson; 16 March 1954 (age 72) Glenelg, South Australia
- Education: South Australian Institute of Technology
- Occupation: Public servant

Mark Ian Paterson (born 16 March 1954) is a senior Australian public servant. He is currently the Chief Commissioner of Australian Skills Quality Authority. He was the Secretary of the Department of Trade and Investment, Regional Infrastructure and Services from June 2011 until April 2015. He also served on the board of Infrastructure NSW.

== Background and early life ==
Mark Paterson gained a Bachelor of Business from the South Australian Institute of Technology, having studied at four different universities around Australia but found trouble when seeking recognition for prior learning, which he saw as a failure of Australia's higher education system.

== Career ==
Between 1996 and 2002 Paterson was head of the Australian Chamber of Commerce and Industry.During 1998 – 2002 Paterson was also the Director of the Australian National Training Authority (ANTA) Board. His next role was as Secretary of the Department of Industry, Tourism and Resources (later Department of Innovation, Industry, Science and Research), to which he was appointed by Prime Minister John Howard, who praised his knowledge and experience.

Paterson was the Director General of the NSW Department of Trade and Investment, Regional Infrastructure and Services from June 2011. His dismissal from the role, and abolition of the Department was reported on Tuesday 7 April 2015

Paterson commenced as Commissioner, Regulatory Operations, of Australian Skills Quality Authority on 30 May 2016. The Commissioner, Regulatory Operations, is responsible for the effective implementation of ASQA’s regulatory operations. This includes the initial assessment of regulatory matters, ASQA’s extensive audit program and the growing focus on investigations and enforcement action in serious cases. The Commissioner also has oversight of ASQA’s course accreditation process which accredits new courses to be nationally recognised, and ASQA’s regulatory reporting functions.

== Awards ==
Paterson was appointed an Officer of the Order of Australia in 2007 for service to business and industry through policy development and economic research. He was elected a Fellow of the Royal Society of New South Wales in 2019.

== References and further reading ==
- Malone, Paul (2006). "Chapter 10: The Company Man – Mark Paterson, Department of Industry, Tourism and Resources". Australian department heads under Howard : career paths and practice (PDF). Canberra, Australia: Australian National University. pp. 59–67. ISBN 1-920942-83-1. Archived from the original (PDF) on 6 November 2013.
- Nicholls, Sean (12 May 2011). "New man to 'sell NSW to the world'". The Sydney Morning Herald. Fairfax Media. Archived from the original on 31 August 2011.

Government offices
Preceded by Russell Higgins as Secretary of the Department of Industry, Science and Resources	Secretary of the Department of Industry, Tourism and Resources; 2002–2007	Succeeded by Himself as Secretary of the Department of Innovation, Industry, Science and Research
Preceded by Russell Higgins as Secretary of the Department of Industry, Science and Resources	Secretary of the Department of Industry, Tourism and Resources; 2002–2007	Succeeded by Peter Boxall as Secretary of the Department of Resources, Energy and Tourism
Preceded by Himself as Secretary of the Department of Industry, Tourism and Resources	Secretary of the Department of Innovation, Industry, Science and Research; 2007–2011	Succeeded by Don Russell
