= Department of Industry, Tourism and Resources =

Australian government department, 2001–2007

Department overview
- Formed: 26 November 2001
- Preceding Department: Department of Industry, Science and Resources Department of Employment, Workplace Relations and Small Business
- Dissolved: 3 December 2007
- Superseding Department: Department of Resources, Energy and Tourism Department of the Environment, Water, Heritage and the Arts Department of Innovation, Industry, Science and Research
- Jurisdiction: Commonwealth of Australia
- Minister responsible: Ian Macfarlane, Minister
- Department executive: Mark Paterson, Secretary
- Website: industry.gov.au

The Department of Industry, Tourism and Resources was an Australian government department that existed between November 2001 and December 2007.

== Scope ==
Information about the department's functions and government funding allocation can be found in the Administrative Arrangements Orders, the annual Portfolio Budget Statements, the Department's annual reports, and on the Department's website.

At its creation, the Department was responsible for the following:

- Manufacturing and commerce, including industry and market development
- Industry innovation policy and technology diffusion
- Promotion of industrial research and development
- Mineral and energy industries, including oil and gas, and electricity
- Energy-specific international organisations and activities
- Biotechnology, excluding gene technology regulation
- Export services
- Energy and resources science and research
- Geoscience research and information services
- Marketing, including export promotion, of manufactures and services
- Investment promotion and facilitation
- Enterprise improvement
- Tourism industry
- Construction industry
- Small business policy and implementation, including business entry point management
- Facilitation of the development of service industries generally
- Bounties on the production of goods
- Patents of inventions and designs, and trade marks
- Country of origin labelling
- Weights and measures standards
- Civil space issues
- Analytical laboratory services
- Geodesy, mapping, remote sensing and land information co-ordination
- Ionospheric prediction
- Administration of export controls on energy products

== Structure ==
The Department was an Australian Public Service department, staffed by officials who were responsible to the Minister for Industry, Tourism and Resources, Ian Macfarlane. The Secretary of the Department was Mark I. Paterson.
