= Peter Boxall (public servant) =

Australian public servant and policymaker

Peter Boxall AO

Secretary of the Department of Resources, Energy and Tourism
- In office 3 December 2007 – 2008

Secretary of the Department of Employment and Workplace Relations
- In office 26 November 2001 – 3 December 2007

Secretary of the Department of Finance and Administration
- In office 9 October 1997 – 23 November 2001

Secretary of the Department of Finance
- In office 18 January 1997 – 9 October 1997

Personal details
- Born: Peter John Boxall
- Spouse: Karen Chester
- Children: 2 children
- Education: Monash University (BEc (Hons)); Australian National University (MEc); University of Chicago (PhD)
- Occupation: Public servant

Peter John Boxall AO is a former senior Australian public servant and policymaker.

== Background and early life ==
Peter Boxall was brought up on a farm in Victoria. From year nine, he went to boarding school at Ballarat Grammar. He attained a Master of Economics from the Australian National University in 1973.

== Career ==
Boxall spent seven years working at the International Monetary Fund in the United States. He then chose to study for his doctorate at the University of Chicago with supervision from Gary Becker, Robert Lucas and Sherwin Rosen.

On returning to Australia in 1986, Boxall joined the Department of the Treasury in the Australian Public Service. He took leave from work in the public sector to work as Chief of staff to Peter Costello, Deputy leader of the Liberal Party of Australia in the late 1980s and early 1990s.

Boxall returned to the Australian Public Service in 1997, having been appointed Secretary of the Department of Finance. He stayed with the finance department as it transitioned to become the Department of Finance and Administration. While head of the Finance Department, Boxall was known as being at the forefront of outsourcing services from the public service, including for IT. He also oversaw efforts to engage the private sector to manage the Department's $2.5 billion property portfolio, with the aim to tap into a strategic partnership as an avenue for resources and expertise.

In 2001 he was appointed Secretary of the Department of Employment and Workplace Relations (DEWR), an organisation with over 3000 staff. During his time at DEWR he was involved in implementing the Howard government's controversial WorkChoices policies. He stayed at DEWR until December 2007 when he was appointed head of the Department of Resources, Energy and Tourism.

Boxall worked as a commissioner Australian Securities and Investments Commission between January 2009 and November 2011, leaving to take up a job in the NSW Government as Chairman of the Independent Pricing and Regulatory Tribunal.

In 2013 and 2014, he was a member of the Abbott government's National Commission of Audit, which was established to improve the Australian government's budget.

== Awards ==
Boxall was named an Officer of the Order of Australia in 2007 for service to economic and financial policy development and reform in the areas of accrual budgeting, taxation and workplace relations.

== References and further reading ==
- Malone, Paul (2006), "Chapter 14: The Unabashed Rationalist – Peter Boxall, Department of Employment and Workplace Relations", Australian department heads under Howard : career paths and practice (PDF), Canberra, Australia: The Australian National University, pp. 91–97, ISBN 1-920942-83-1, archived from the original (PDF) on 6 November 2013

Government offices
Preceded by Mark Paterson as Secretary of the Department of Industry, Tourism and Resources	Secretary of the Department of Resources, Energy and Tourism; 2007–2008	Succeeded by John Pierce
Preceded by Peter Shergold as Secretary of the Department of Employment, Workplace Relations and Small Business	Secretary of the Department of Employment and Workplace Relations; 2001–2007	Succeeded by Lisa Paul as Secretary of the Department of Education, Employment and Workplace Relations
Preceded by Himself as Secretary of the Department of Finance	Secretary of the Department of Finance and Administration; 1997–2001	Succeeded by Ian Watt
Preceded by John Mellors as Secretary of the Department of Administrative Services	Secretary of the Department of Finance and Administration; 1997–2001	Succeeded by Ian Watt
Preceded by Steve Sedgwick	Secretary of the Department of Finance; 1997	Succeeded by Himself as Secretary of the Department of Finance and Administration
