= Research and Development Array =

Research and development in the United States

The Research and Development Array (RDA) is a research and development effort related to the Pierre Auger Observatory. It consists of a set of water tanks and communication towers near Lamar, CO.

== Goals ==
The goals are to study potential upgrades to the existing Auger South ultra-high-energy cosmic ray observatory as well as develop technology for the proposed Auger North observatory. The RDA investigates modifications to the Pierre Auger Observatory surface detectors (SD) and to the communications system by which the SDs transmit their data to the central data acquisition.

== Overview ==
The RDA is located in an area of several square miles just South of the city of Lamar, Colorado, in the United States, part of the area proposed for Auger North. It consists of surface detectors (water tanks instrumented with photomultiplier tubes and readout electronics), communication towers, and a building housing the data concentrator and computing. The ten water tanks are instrumented with one photomultiplier tube each to detect the Cherenkov radiation generated by particles in cosmic ray air showers. (The water tanks currently used in the southern Pierre Auger observatory use three photomultiplier tubes each.) The communication towers will test a new way to transport data from the water tanks to the data concentrator. A higher bandwidth will benefit many possible upgrades to the southern site. A new communication system is also needed to allow the proposed northern detector array to cover a larger area than the existing southern observatory. In the existing system all surface detectors directly transmit to a single point. In a larger array this would not be feasible. Surface detectors would communicate with their nearest neighbors and surface detectors close to the single data concentrator station would relay the data from surface detectors that are further away.
