= Geoff Miller (diplomat) =

Australian public servant and diplomat

Geoff Miller AO

Director-General of the Office of National Assessments
- In office 1989–1995

Personal details
- Born: Walter Geoffrey Thomas Miller; 25 October 1934 Queenstown, Tasmania, Australia
- Died: 14 January 2026 (aged 91) Canberra, Australian Capital Territory
- Spouse: Rachel Miller
- Children: 4
- Education: Corpus Christi College, Oxford

Walter Geoffrey Thomas Miller AO (25 October 1934 – 14 January 2026) was a senior Australian public servant and diplomat, best known for heading the Office of National Assessments between 1989 and 1995.

== Life and career ==
Miller was the Tasmanian Rhodes scholar in 1956, and went on to graduate from the University of Oxford.

In 1989 Miller was appointed head of the Australian Government's intelligence assessment agency, the Office of National Assessments. His tenure at the office, between 1989 and 1995, coincided with the first Gulf War, the dissolution of the Soviet Union and the beginning of the Yugoslav Wars; and he oversaw intelligence assessment analysts working on developments in these regions as well developments relating to Australia's commitment to United Nations peacekeeping.

In 1995, Miller was appointed Australian High Commissioner to New Zealand, to commence in January 1996.

Miller retired from his diplomatic and Australian Public Service career in 2000.

Miller died in Canberra on 14 January 2026 aged 91.

== Awards ==
In January 1993, Miller was made an Officer of the Order of Australia for public service and service to international relations.

Government offices
Preceded by Michael Cook	Director-General of the Office of National Assessments; 1989–1995	Succeeded by Philip Flood
Diplomatic posts
Preceded by Donald Jame Horne	Australian Ambassador to the Republic of Korea; 1978–1980	Succeeded by Ted Pocock
Preceded by Neil Currie	Australian Ambassador to Japan; 1986–1989	Succeeded by Rawdon Dalrymple
Preceded by Ray Greet	Australian High Commissioner to New Zealand; 1996–2000	Succeeded by Bob Cotton
