= Department of Innovation, Industry, Science and Research =

Australian government department, 2007–2011

Department overview
- Formed: 3 December 2007
- Preceding Department: Department of Industry, Tourism and Resources Department of Employment, Workplace Relations and Small Business - for matters relating to small business
- Dissolved: 14 December 2011
- Superseding Department: Department of Industry, Innovation, Science, Research and Tertiary Education
- Jurisdiction: Commonwealth of Australia
- Headquarters: Canberra
- Annual budget: A$9.384 billion (2011–12)
- Department executives: Mark Paterson, Secretary (2007–11); Don Russell, Secretary (2011)
- Website: www.innovation.gov.au

The Department of Innovation, Industry, Science and Research (also called DIISR), was a department of the Australian Government that existed between December 2007 and December 2011. The department was charged with further developing growth in Australian industries and advancements in science and research. Ministers with responsibility for the department included Kim Carr, Minister for Innovation, Industry, Science and Research and Nick Sherry, Minister for Small Business.

The department was responsible for:

- Manufacturing and commerce including industry and market development
- Industry innovation policy and technology diffusion
- Promotion of industrial research and development, and commercialisation
- Biotechnology, excluding gene technology regulation
- Export services
- Marketing, including export promotion, of manufactures and services
- Investment promotion
- Enterprise improvement
- Construction industry
- Small business policy and implementation
- Business entry point management
- Facilitation of the development of service industries generally
- Bounties on the production of goods
- Trade marks, plant breeders' rights and patents of inventions and designs
- Country of origin labelling
- Weights and measures standards
- Civil space issues
- Analytical laboratory services
- Science policy
- Promotion of collaborative research in science and technology
- Co-ordination of research policy
- Commercialisation and utilisation of public sector research relating to portfolio programs and agencies
- Research grants and fellowships
- Information and communications technology industry development

The department was made up of several divisions, including Innovation, Manufacturing, Science & Research, Corporate, Industry & Small Business Policy, eBusiness and Questacon. The Enterprise Connect and AusIndustry divisions served as the program delivery arms of the department.

The department was headed by a secretary, initially Mark Paterson, who was succeeded in June 2011 by Don Russell.
