= Department of Climate Change, Energy, the Environment and Water =

Australian government department

Department overview
- Formed: 1 July 2022
- Preceding agencies: Department of Industry, Science, Energy and Resources; Department of Agriculture, Water and the Environment
- Jurisdiction: Australian Government
- Ministers responsible: Chris Bowen, Minister for Climate Change and Energy; Murray Watt, Minister for the Environment and Water
- Department executive: Mike Kaiser, Secretary
- Child agencies: Australian Institute of Marine Science; Murray–Darling Basin Authority
- Website: www.dcceew.gov.au

The Department of Climate Change, Energy, the Environment and Water (DCCEEW) is a department of the Australian Government. The department was established on 1 July 2022, superseding the water and environment functions from the Department of Agriculture, Water and the Environment and energy functions from the Department of Industry, Science, Energy and Resources.

The inaugural head of the department is the Secretary, David Fredericks. In July 2025 Anthony Albanese announced the appointment of Mike Kaiser as Secretary.

== Operational activities ==
In an Administrative Arrangements Order made on 13 May 2025, the functions of the department were broadly classified into the following matters:

- Environment protection and conservation of biodiversity
- Air quality
- Land contamination
- Waste programs
- Management of Industrial Chemicals
- Meteorology
- Administration of the Australian Antarctic Territory, and the Territory of Heard Island and McDonald Islands
- Natural, built and cultural heritage
- Environmental information and research
- Ionospheric prediction
- Water policy and resources
- Environmental water use and resources relating to the Commonwealth Environmental Water Holder
- National water infrastructure investment
- Development and co-ordination of domestic community and household climate action
- Climate change adaptation strategy and co-ordination
- Co-ordination of climate change science activities
- Development and co-ordination of international climate change policy
- International climate change negotiations
- Greenhouse emissions and energy consumption reporting
- Greenhouse gas abatement programmes
- Energy policy
- National energy market, including electricity, gas and liquid fuels
- National fuel quality standards
- Renewable energy
- Renewable energy target policy, regulation and co-ordination
- Renewable energy technology development
- Industrial energy efficiency
- Energy efficiency
- Energy-specific international obligations and activities
- Carbon management technologies policies and programs

== See also ==
- Department of Agriculture, Fisheries and Forestry
- United Nations Framework Convention on Climate Change (UNFCCC)
