= Department of Industry, Innovation, Climate Change, Science, Research and Tertiary Education =

Australian government department, 2013–2013

Department overview
- Formed: 25 March 2013
- Preceding Department: Department of Industry, Innovation, Science, Research and Tertiary Education Department of Climate Change and Energy Efficiency
- Dissolved: 18 September 2013
- Superseding Department: Department of Industry
- Jurisdiction: Commonwealth of Australia
- Employees: 4188 (at April 2013)
- Annual budget: A$9.384 billion (2011/12)
- Department executive: Don Russell, Secretary
- Child agencies: Australian Institute of Marine Science; ANSTO; Australian Qualifications Framework; ARC; CSIRO; IP Australia; Office of the Chief Scientist; TEQSA
- Website: www.innovation.gov.au

The Department of Industry, Innovation, Climate Change, Science, Research and Tertiary Education was a department of the Australian Government charged with further developing growth in Australian industries and advancements in science and research.

== History ==
The department was established on 25 March 2013, taking on functions of the previous Department of Climate Change and Energy Efficiency and the Department of Industry, Innovation, Science, Research and Tertiary Education.

It was abolished less than six months later on 18 September 2013 by the newly elected Abbott government. Its functions were principally transferred to the Department of Industry; with its environmental functions transferred to the Department of the Environment.

Discussing the department's lengthy name and acronym DIICCSRTE in 2014, former Secretary Don Russell told media:

We have a tradition in Australia of mentioning all the responsibilities in department's names, largely for benefit of stakeholders. But it does get a bit ridiculous, a nine-letter name for a department.

== Scope ==
The department was responsible for:

- Manufacturing and commerce including industry and market development
- Industry innovation policy and technology diffusion
- Promotion of industrial research and development, and commercialisation
- Biotechnology, excluding gene technology regulation
- Export services
- Marketing, including export promotion, of manufactures and services
- Investment promotion
- Enterprise improvement
- Construction industry
- Small business policy and implementation
- Business entry point management
- Facilitation of the development of service industries generally
- Bounties on the production of goods
- Trade marks, plant breeders’ rights and patents of inventions and designs
- Country of origin labelling
- Weights and measures standards
- Civil space issues
- Analytical laboratory services
- Science policy
- Promotion of collaborative research in science and technology
- Co-ordination of research policy
- Commercialisation and utilisation of public sector research relating to portfolio programs and agencies
- Research grants and fellowships
- Information and communications technology industry development

The department was made up of several divisions including Innovation, Manufacturing, Science & Research, Corporate, Industry & Small Business Policy, eBusiness and Questacon. The Enterprise Connect and AusIndustry divisions served as the program delivery arms of the department.
