= Australian Research Data Commons =

- Abbreviation: ARDC
- Established: July 2018 (8 years ago)
- Types: public company limited by guarantee, nonprofit organization
- Legal status: public company limited by guarantee
- Aim: national research data infrastructure
- Headquarters: Melbourne
- Location: Melbourne, Canberra, Adelaide, Perth, Ballarat, Brisbane, Sydney

The Australian Research Data Commons (ARDC) is a limited company, formed on 1 July 2018 by combining the Australian National Data Service (ANDS), Nectar (National eResearch Collaboration Tools and Resources) and Research Data Services (RDS). Its purpose is to enable Australian researchers and industry access to nationally significant eInfrastructure, skills platforms, and data collections.

ANDS was established in 2008 in order to help address the challenges of storing, managing and making accessible Australia's research data. It was a joint collaboration between Monash University, The Australian National University and CSIRO. It manages Research Data Australia, a web portal which enables access to data from over 100 Australian research organisations, cultural institutions, and government agencies.

Nectar was established in 2009 by the Australian Government, with the project directorate to establish the IT infrastructure at the University of Melbourne created in 2011.

The Research Data Services project provides service development for prioritised areas of research, and continuing operational support of the IT infrastructure which accesses the data in the national collections.

== ANDS and Research Data Australia ==
A project led by Monash University in collaboration with the Australian National University (ANU) and CSIRO created the basis for full ANDS implementation. The aim was to allow researchers "to identify, locate, access and analyse any available research data", by transforming the large number of scattered and disparate collections around Australia into a cohesive and accessible body of resources, with the importance of eResearch Infrastructure to Australian future research competitiveness emphasised as a prime reason.

Funding was provided through the Australian Government's National Collaborative Research Infrastructure Strategy (NCRIS), as part of a funding agreement between the Department of Innovation, Industry, Science and Research (DIISR) and Monash University in September 2008. In mid-2009 ANDS was further funded by the Education Investment Fund (EIF) for the establishment of the Australian Research Data Commons under the Australian Government’s Super Science Initiative.

Research Data Australia (formerly the ANDS Collections Registry), ANDS' most significant service, is a web portal which enables access to data from over 100 Australian research organisations, cultural institutions, and government agencies. The Online Research Collections Australia (ORCA) Registry was the software utility that drove the ANDS Collections Registry, which was precursor to Research Data Australia. They were all used as names for the online discovery service run by ANDS, which allows researchers to publicise the existence of their research data and enables prospective users of that data to find it.

Research Data Australia made use of the ISO 2146-based RIF-CS metadata standard.

== Research Data Services ==
The Research Data Services project is a continuation of the Research Data Storage Infrastructure (RDSI).

== Nectar ==
The National Collaboration Tools and Resources project, or Nectar, was established in 2009 by the Australian Government with a A$47 million budget, as part of the "Super Science" initiative, financed by the Education Investment Fund (EIF). Since then it has received more government funding, as well as a similar investment by Australian universities and research institutions. The project got off the ground in 2011 at the University of Melbourne. It partners with other research communities to develop and manage 12 virtual laboratories, 16 e-research tools, and the 50,000 core National Research Cloud, known as the Nectar Cloud, with approximately 20,000 users.

== Australian Research Data Commons ==
The three organisations created an aligned set of investments and business plans in 2017/8 in order to integrate their work in line with the 2016 National Research Infrastructure (NCRIS) Roadmap, created for the Department of Education and Training.

Monash University remains the lead agent of ANDS, University of Queensland the lead agent of RDS, and University of Melbourne the lead agent of Nectar.
