= Department of Industry, Science, Energy and Resources =

Australian government department, 2020–2022

Department overview
- Formed: 21 September 2015
- Preceding Department: Department of Industry and Science
- Dissolved: 30 June 2022
- Superseding Department: Department of Industry, Science and Resources Department of Climate Change, Energy, the Environment and Water
- Jurisdiction: Australian Government
- Annual budget: $864 million AUD (2020 estimated)
- Ministers responsible: Chris Bowen, Minister for Climate Change and Energy; Ed Husic, Minister for Industry and Science; Madeleine King, Minister for Resources and Minister for Northern Australia
- Department executive: David Fredericks, Secretary
- Website: www.industry.gov.au

The Department of Industry, Science, Energy and Resources was a department of the Australian Government responsible for consolidating the Government’s efforts to drive economic growth, productivity and competitiveness by bringing together industry, energy, resources and science. The department superseded the Department of Industry, Innovation and Science on 1 February 2020.

It was superseded by the Department of Industry, Science and Resources and the Department of Climate Change, Energy, the Environment and Water on 1 July 2022. The head of the department at the time of dissolution was the Secretary, David Fredericks.

The Chief Scientist for Australia has reported to the Minister for Science of the day since 1989.

== History ==
Following the appointment of Malcolm Turnbull as prime minister, the Department of Industry, Innovation and Science was established on 21 September 2015, taking on the functions of the previous Department of Industry and Science.

On 20 December 2017, the Department of Industry, Innovation and Science was placed in the newly formed Jobs and Innovation portfolio alongside the Department of Jobs and Small Business.

== Scope ==
As outlined in the Administrative Arrangements Orders, the department is responsible for a wide range of functions including:

- Manufacturing and commerce including industry and market development
- Industry innovation policy and technology diffusion
- Construction industry, excluding workplace relations
- Facilitation of the development of service industries generally
- Trade marks, plant breeders’ rights and patents of inventions and designs
- Anti-dumping
- Civil space issues
- Science policy
- Energy policy
