= Department of Industry (Australia) =

Australian Government department, 2013–2014

Department overview
- Formed: 18 September 2013
- Preceding Department: Department of Industry, Innovation, Climate Change, Science, Research and Tertiary Education
- Dissolved: 23 December 2014
- Superseding Department: Department of Industry and Science
- Jurisdiction: Commonwealth of Australia
- Headquarters: Canberra
- Employees: 5,154 (at June 2014)
- Ministers responsible: Ian Macfarlane, Minister for Industry; Bob Baldwin, Parliamentary Secretary to the Minister for Industry
- Department executive: Glenys Beauchamp, Secretary
- Child agencies: Australian Institute of Marine Science; ANSTO; Australian Qualifications Framework; ARC; CSIRO; IP Australia; Office of the Chief Scientist; TEQSA
- Website: www.innovation.gov.au

The Australian Department of Industry was a department of the Australian Government charged with shaping Australia's future economy through skills, discovery and innovation. The Department existed between September 2013 and December 2014.

Ministerial officeholders were:

- The Minister for Industry the Hon Ian Macfarlane MP
  - The Parliamentary Secretary to the Minister for Industry the Hon Bob Baldwin
