= Peter Hastings (journalist) =

Australian journalist and editor

Peter Dunstan Hastings AO (1920–1990) was an Australian journalist and editor. He was editor of Consolidated Press's Bulletin (1962–64), and foreign affairs writer for News Ltd's Australian (1966–70) and John Fairfax & Sons Ltd's Sydney Morning Herald (1970–74, 1976–90). As a journalist specializing in Indonesia and Papua New Guinea, Hastings became a respected figure in both of these countries, despite being banned from Indonesia on two occasions. He also enjoyed good relationships with embassies and Australian Government officials in Canberra.

== Life and career ==
Hastings was born on 1 October 1920 at Wahroonga in Sydney. He attended Sydney Grammar School and matriculated in 1941, before attending the University of Sydney without graduating. In May 1941 he enlisted in the Citizen Military Forces and in 1942 transferred to the Australian Imperial Force (AIF) As a sergeant in intelligence, he served with the Central Bureau, a code-breaking signals unit and with the Far Eastern Liaison Office. On 3 July 1944 he was discharged from the AIF as medically unfit.

After the War, Hastings realised an aptitude for journalism by joining Consolidated Press Ltd. He was posted to New York City in 1948. For the next six years, Hasting provided daily dispatches to the Daily Telegraph in which he closely followed the activities of the United Nations.

Hastings was also the executive officer of the ‘think tank’, the Council on New Guinea Affairs which he founded with (Sir) John Kerr, and was senior research fellow at the Strategic and Defence Studies Centre, Australian National University, in Canberra from 1974 to 1976.

Hastings was banned from Indonesia for reporting on its military preparation for the 1975 invasion of East Timor and in 1984 for reporting on the death of anthropologist Arnold Ap in Irian Jaya.

On 26 January 1990, Hastings was awarded an Australia Day Honour for service to journalism.

== Personal life ==
Hastings married Scottish-born Jeanette (Jan) Duncan England on 7 March 1946 at Harbord Presbyterian Church, Freshwater, New South Wales. Hastings had two sons with his wife before divorcing in 1980. Hastings then married Jolika Barbara Tie, née Bartsch, on 28 March 1981 at the Registry of Births, Deaths and Marriages, Sydney.

After years of emphysema and ischaemic heart disease, Hastings died on 7 August 1990 at his home at Manly.
