= Public Service Medal (Australia) =

- Medal and ribbon
- Type: Medal
- Awarded for: Outstanding Service
- Presented by: Governor-General of Australia
- Eligibility: Employees of the Australian Government and state, territory and local government employees
- Post-nominals: PSM
- Status: Currently awarded
- Established: 18 October 1989
- First award: 1990 Australia Day Honours

Highlights
- Total: 3,323

Order of Wear
- Next (higher): Distinguished Service Medal (DSM)
- Next (lower): Australian Police Medal (APM)

The Public Service Medal (PSM) is a civil decoration awarded to Australian public servants (at all levels) for outstanding service. The PSM was introduced in 1989 and replaced the Imperial Service Order discontinued in Australia in 1975, supplementing the Order of Australia introduced that same year. Recipients of the Public Service Medal are entitled to use the post-nominal letters "PSM".

The medal is awarded twice each year by the Governor-General of Australia, on the nomination of the responsible Minister in each state or territory, and at the federal level. The total number of awards made each year must not exceed 100, further broken down into a quota for each government public service.

== Description ==
- The Public Service Medal is a circular nickel-silver medal ensigned with a Federation Star. The obverse shows an inner circle with four planetary gears spaced equally around a sun gear. It is surrounded by the words 'Public Service'. An outer circle shows 36 human figures symbolising a range of occupations and activities.
- The reverse displays a wreath of mimosa surrounding the inscription 'For Outstanding Service'.
- The 32 millimetre-wide ribbon features the national colours of green and gold in a vertical striped pattern.

== See also ==
- Australian Honours Order of Precedence
