= Research Quality Framework =

Research Quality Framework (RQF) was a component of Backing Australia's Ability, an initiative of the Australian Government to formulate a best practice framework for assessing research quality and the impact of research, and ensure that public funding was being invested in research which would deliver real benefits to the wider community. RQF was to bring public funding of research in line with government policy for funding to be determined by outcomes achieved.

It was an assessment framework and a funding model, similar to the Research Assessment Exercise in the United Kingdom and the Performance Based Research Fund in New Zealand.

On 21 December 2007, the new Australian Government announced that it would not be proceeding with the RQF project, which was an initiative of the former Government, and began developing the Excellence in Research for Australia initiative.

== Assessment framework ==
Focuses on quality and impact.

The quality of research includes its intrinsic merit and academic impact – that is recognition of the originality of research by peers and its impact on the development of the same or related disciple areas.

The broader impact is an assessment of value through use, i.e. the extent to which research is successfully applied – that is recognition by qualified end-users that quality research has been successfully applied.

=== Ratings ===
- Simple ratings scale
  - Quality : 5 points
  - Impact : 3 points
- Sensitive to discipline differences
- Informs funding at institutional level, with institutions distributing funds according to their own priorities
- The implementation will be assessing the five-year period prior to its commencement, e.g. 2001–2006.

=== Assessors ===
- Decided on the recommendation of the EAG

=== Oversight Committee ===
- Chairs of assessment panels and other significant Australian and international experts
- Sets eligibility, assessment and assessor guidelines as well as guidelines relating to early career research and other emerging areas of research priority
- Approves moderation (across panels) and validation (or measures) mechanisms

== Funding model ==
Will replace the RTS block funding model, and will be at least 50% of the determinations of funding. Nelson says : all of the Institutional Grants Scheme (IGS) and at least 50% of the Research Training Scheme (RTS).

== Committees ==
=== Expert Advisory Group ===
UK's Professor Sir Gareth Roberts was appointed as the Chair of the Expert Advisory Group, having been commissioned in June 2002 to review the future of research assessment in the UK.

Members

The list of members was announced 21 December 2004 as:

- Professor Paul Callaghan, Director of the MacDiarmid Institute for Advanced Materials and Nanotechnology, Victoria University of Wellington, New Zealand. Professor Callaghan chaired the Moderation Panel of New Zealand's Performance-Based Research Fund (PBRF) in 2003
- Dr Michael Barber, executive director, Science Planning, CSIRO, and previously the Pro Vice Chancellor (Research and Innovation) at University of Western Australia.
- Professor Ian Chubb, Chair of the Group of Eight from November 2003 to September 2005, and Vice-Chancellor of Australian National University since 2001
- Professor Peter Høj, CEO of the Australian Research Council since 1 October 2004
- Dr Ian O Smith, executive director, Australian Nuclear Science and Technology Organisation since May 2004.
- Dr Robin Batterham, chief technologist of Rio Tinto Group. Formerly chief scientist of Australia.
- Professor Peter Sheehan, Chair of the AVCC's RQF working group, and currently Vice-Chancellor of the Australian Catholic University.
- Philip Clark, representing the Business Council of Australia, member of the J P Morgan Advisory Council, and was the CEO of Minter Ellison.
- Professor Ross Milbourne, representing the Australian Technology Network of Universities and Vice Chancellor and President of the University of Technology, Sydney.
- Professor Anne Edwards, Convenor of the Innovative Research Universities Australia and Vice Chancellor of Flinders University.
- Professor Alan Pettigrew, CEO of the National Health and Medical Research Council since January 2001.
- Dr Evan Arthur, Group Manager of the Innovation and Research Systems Group in Department of Education, Science and Training (DEST).

=== Development Advisory Group ===
Minister Julie Bishop received the Research Quality Framework: Assessing the quality and impact of research in Australia – Final Advice on the Preferred RQF Model paper from Sir Gareth Roberts, approved its release, and announced the establishment of the RQF Development Advisory Group (RQFDAG), to be chaired by Australia's chief scientist, Dr Jim Peacock AC.

Members

The following members of the Expert Advisory Group continued on to the DAG:

- Dr Michael Barber
- Phil Clark
- Dr Ian O Smith

The other DAG members are:

- Terry Enright, Chairman of the Grains Research & Development Corporation (GRDC) Board
- Emeritus Professor Chris Fell AM, representing the Australian Academy of Technological Sciences and Engineering
- Leanne Harvey, Branch Manager of Research Systems Branch in the Department of Education, Science and Training
- Dr Warren King, representing the Cooperative Research Centres' Committee
- Professor Jane Marceau, representing the Academy of the Social Sciences in Australia, Pro-Vice Chancellor (Research), University of Western Sydney.
- Dr Phil McFadden, representing the Australian Academy of Science is the chief scientist, Geoscience Australia.
- Professor Ian Davey, representing the AVCC
- Professor Deryck Schreuder, representing the Australian Academy of Humanities, retired in 2004 as Vice-Chancellor and President of the University of Western Australia

== Timeline ==
=== 2003 ===
- 18 December – AVCC released a major policy statement Advancing Australia's Abilities: Foundations for the future of research in Australia in response to the Government's various research reviews.

=== 2004 ===
- 3 May – Australian Bureau of Statistics released figures indicating that Higher Education Expenditure on Research and Development (HERD) had increased overall by 23% over the previous two years to 2002. HERD as a percentage of gross domestic product has increased from 0.42% in 2000 to 0.45% in 2002.
- 6 May – Prime Minister John Howard announced the start of an 18-month process to establish "Quality and Accessibility Frameworks for Publicly Funded Research" as part of the Backing Australia's Ability – Building our Future through Science and Innovation.
- 8 September - New Information from the Australian Bureau of Statistics (ABS) shows that while government expenditure on R&D increased by almost 6% from 2000–01 to 2002–03, when expressed as a proportion of gross domestic product (GDP), it has fallen from 0.35% to 0.33%.
- 13 September – the latest Australian Bureau of Statistics (ABS) information on national investment in research and development (R&D) shows R&D has only just climbed back to the point it was at ten years ago.
- 28 September – ALP releases its research and innovation policy, Enterprise Australia.
- 5 October – Labor reissues Aim Higher policy.

=== 2005 ===
- 1 February – AVCC releases preliminary comments on the Government's "consultation discussion starter" paper on the research quality framework. The Vice-Chancellors agreed to develop a common position on the framework and provide input at each stage of its development.
- 7 March – Group of Eight released a statement.
- 29 March – Australian Vice-Chancellors' Committee (AVCC) welcomed the release of the issues paper "Research Quality Framework: Assessing the quality and impact of research in Australia".
- 31 March – AVCC welcomed the release of the Governments discussion paper "Building Better Foundations For Higher Education in Australia: A discussion about re-aligning Commonwealth-State responsibilities", which focused on three aspects :
  - the implementation of the National Protocols on Higher Education Approval Processes
  - universities' powers to engage in commercial activities
  - and the operation of governing bodies
- 19 April – AVCC states that the benefits of the Government's own Backing Australia's Future Reform Package are significantly reduced by failing to adequately index funding to the higher education sector in the 2003 Reform Package.
- 9 May – Formal launch of the CSIRO Flagship Collaboration Fund, announced as part of the second Backing Australia's Ability package.
- 11 May – Australian Vice-Chancellors' Committee (AVCC) submitted a statement "Enhancing Australia's core research capacity – developing a Research Quality Framework", incorporating a preliminary model of how Vice-Chancellors believe the Research Quality Framework (RQF) should work, to the Government's Expert Advisory Group.
- 25 May – AVCC responds to Governments 31 March paper.
- 26 May – AVCC releases "Quality and Diversity: A framework for approving higher education providers in response to the Government's issues paper Building University Diversity: future approval and accreditation processes for Australian higher education." (Appears unrelated).
- 31 May – Government released the Advanced Approaches Paper, "Research Quality Framework: Assessing the quality and impact of research in Australia".
- May 2005 – RQF Issues Paper
- 2 June – Research Quality Framework National Stakeholder Forum
- 3 June – Expert Advisory Group meets.
- 15 July – the Minister for Education, Science and Training, Dr Brendan Nelson's announcement to abolish the Australian Research Council Board. As part of the Review of the Corporate Governance of Statutory Authorities and Office Holders (Uhrig Report), of the ARC, Minister Nelson has made the decision to abolish the ARC's Board in favour of an executive management system. In 2004 the Minister exercised his power under the ARC Act to reject grants recommended for funding by the ARC Board.
- 17 August – AVCC released an updated proposal for the Research Quality Framework as a work-in-progress.
- 19 August – EAG meeting held
- September 2005 – The RQF Preferred Model was released.
- 9 September – AVCC welcomes the release of the "Research Quality Framework: Assessing the quality and impact of research in Australia – The Preferred Model."
- 6 October – Australian Vice-Chancellors' Committee's Board of Directors, AVCC President Di Yerbury put forward a proposal, for discussion at the plenary meeting of AVCC in November, for a full review of AVCC.
- 12 October – AVCC submits an issues paper to the Expert Advisory Group's (EAG) Preferred Model for the Research Quality Framework (RQF).

=== 2006 ===
- 27 January – Minister Julie Bishop is sworn in.
- 28 February – Chief Scientist Jim Peacock AC appointed. In a Press Club address Minister Bishop recognised the importance that the role the chief scientist has in raising the profile of science and innovation in Australia, encouraging links and acting as an effective liaison between government, the private sector, and the research sector. The AVCC states that it is concerned that the position has been appointed on a part-time basis.
- 10 March – Treasurer Peter Costello and Minister for Education, Science and Training, Ms Julie Bishop announce the Productivity Commission Review into the benefits of public investment in science and innovation in Australia.
- 28 March – Minister Julie Bishop received the Research Quality Framework: Assessing the quality and impact of research in Australia – Final Advice on the Preferred RQF Model paper from Sir Gareth Roberts, who chaired the Expert Advisory Group (EAG). The Minister approved the release and announced the establishment of the RQF Development Advisory Group (RQFDAG), to be chaired by Australia's Chief Scientist, Dr Jim Peacock AC.
- 30 March 2006 – The Australian Research Council Amendment Bill 2006 and its Explanatory Memorandum is introduced into the House of Representatives, endorsed the peer review processes of the Australian Research Council (ARC).
- 4 April – Minister for Foreign Affairs, Alexander Downer and the Minister for Education, Science and Training, Julie Bishop announce a five-year, $1.4 billion Australian Scholarships program. The initiative is expected to more than double existing scholarships for the Asia-Pacific over the next five years, and was scheduled to commence on 1 July 2006.
- 4 May – AVCC Chief Executive Officer John Mullarvey recommended told the Senate Employment, Workplace Relations and Education Legislation Committee that universities had concerns about a number of changes proposed in the ARC Amendment Bill.
- 9 May – 2006–2007 Budget is released.
- 10 May – Senate Committee is scheduled to release its findings.
- 21 July – Australian Labor Party Shadow Minister for Education Jenny Macklin releases Australia's Universities: Building our future in the World – A White Paper on Higher Education, Research and Innovation.
- 4 August – AVCC submits its response to the Productivity Commission research study, recommending :
  - increased investment in research and innovation from 1.6% of Gross Domestic Product (GDP) to 3% by 2020, and
  - new incentives for private sector participation in research
- 30 August – AVCC issues a statement regarding Australian business investment in research and innovation, which was 0.86% for expenditure as a percentage of gross domestic product, compared to the OECD average of 1.53%. The United States is at 1.87% and Japan at 2.36%. Source: OECD Main Science and Technology Indicators Database 2006.
- October 2006 – The RQF – Development Advisory Group (DAG), headed by Chief Scientist Jim Peacock, provided Minister Julie Bishop with the "Recommended Model".
- 19 October – The latest impact study on the Cooperative Research Centres (CRC) Programme, released by the Minister for Education, Science and Training, the Hon Julie Bishop MP, provides proof positive that CRCs are delivering considerable economic, social and environmental returns to their respective partners and to the nation.
- 2 November – The Productivity Commission releases a draft research report Public Support for Science and Innovation raising concerns about the cost/benefits of the proposed Research Quality Framework (RQF) in the absence of a substantial increased research funding pool.
- 27 November – Funding announced under the National Collaborative Research Infrastructure Strategy (NCRIS).
- 19 December – Minister Julie Bishop announced $87.3 million funding for the implementation of the Research Quality Framework (RQF), $41.9 million specifically for universities preparing for the implementation of the first cycle of the RQF, due in 2008.

=== 2007 ===
- 23 January – ALP Leader Kevin Rudd and Shadow Minister for Education and Training, Stephen Smith release New Directions Paper
