= John Zillman =

Australian meteorologist

John William Zillman AO (born 28 July 1939) is an Australian meteorologist, and former President of the World Meteorological Organization and the Australian Academy of Technological Sciences and Engineering (ATSE). He was born and was educated in Brisbane, Queensland. Through his leadership in professional organizations and advisory groups, Zillman has contributed to shaping science and innovation policy in Australia. More widely, he has contributed to raising awareness to the consequences of global climate change through involvement in the Intergovernmental Panel on Climate Change (IPCC). Also Related to Abigail Zillman From Dalby (Great uncle)

== Career ==
Zillman holds a Bachelor of Science (Honours) in Physics and a Bachelor of Arts (Political Science and Public Administration) from the University of Queensland; a Master of Science (Meteorology) from the University of Melbourne; and a Doctorate of Philosophy (Meteorology and Oceanography) from the University of Wisconsin–Madison.

He was Director of the Australian Bureau of Meteorology from 1978 to 2003 and Chairman of the Commonwealth Heads of Marine Agencies from 1994 to 2003. From 1978 to 2004 he was Permanent Representative of Australia with the World Meteorological Organization (WMO). Zillman served as a member of the WMO Executive Council from 1979 to 2004, as First Vice President from 1987 to 1995 and then as president from 1995 to 2003.

He was elected as a Fellow of ATSE in 1980 and served as Honorary Secretary from 1990 to 1994, Vice President from 1995 to 1998, and President from 2003 to 2006. He was President of the National Academies Forum 2005-06 and President of the International Council of Academies of Engineering and Technological Sciences (CAETS) in 2005. He was also awarded the prestigious International Meteorological Organization Prize from the World Meteorological Organization in 2005. In 2011 he was made an Honorary Fellow of the UK's Royal Meteorological Society in recognition of his contribution to meteorology.

Zillman was also a member of the Prime Minister's Science, Engineering and Innovation Council (PMSEIC), as part of the Office of the Chief Scientist (OCS).

== Climate Change ==
While Zillman has contributed to the IPCC, unlike others on the IPCC, he has made public comments that indicate his respect for the IPCC process and has defended it from attack:

The IPCC is not, as... many appear to have been led to believe, some ideologically committed group of scientists with a particular position or perspective on the science which they seek to promote. Rather it is a highly transparent process, supervised by governments, which enables the contemporary state of knowledge of climate change as it emerges from the peer-reviewed published literature to be summarised and assessed by a representative group of the internationally acknowledged experts in the field with their summary assessment subject to one of the most exhaustive processes of peer review and revision that I believe has ever occurred in the international scientific community. The IPCC doesn't have a construct, a model, an ideology or a pre-determined position. It is simply an inter-governmentally coordinated scientific assessment mechanism for producing in summary form, for use by policymakers, a synthesis of the state of the science as it appears in the literature with particular attention to the identification of points on which there is a high level of scientific agreement in the literature and those on which there is little agreement or little confidence in what is agreed.

Of current climate change he goes on to say:

I believe the models are now remarkably good at simulating most of the essential climate forming processes in the atmosphere and the ocean and even the behaviour of the total climate system at the global scale. And, though I would not have said so a decade ago, I now believe, as does the IPCC, that there is no more than a one in three chance that the observed global warming over the past century is entirely natural in origin.

He has said of the IPCC Second Assessment Report:

In order to avoid the risk of having the IPCC reports made vulnerable to charges of political influence, the IPCC Chairman and the WG Co-chairmen were meticulous in insisting that the final decision on whether to accept particular review comments should reside with chapter Lead Authors. This was at variance with the normal role of journal editorial boards and led to suggestions that some Lead Authors ignored valid critical comments or failed to adequately reflect dissenting views when revising their text .

== See also ==
- Global warming
- Category:Climate change
