= Classifications of scholarship =

This page lists the classifications of scholarship; the classifications, thesauri or maps developed to categorise scholarly research. Classifications have been created by many organisations to classify scholarly research. The kinds of activity covered by these classifications include the research itself, the outputs of the research (such as articles in learned journals) and funding for the research.

The classifications operate at different levels of detail. Some cover the whole of scholarly endeavour; some cover broad fields, such as medicine; some cover entire disciplines, such as physics; some cover a specific sub-discipline, such as high-energy physics. In total there are probably hundreds or thousands of different classifications. The classifications have found new applications in the digital era as the basis for many commercial text mining algorithms.

The classifications are the subject of ongoing inquiry and development among academics and agencies studying the system of science. These agencies include the OECD and the U.S. National Research Council. A conference on science mapping standards was held in 2013 at Indiana University.

== Sources for information on classifications ==
=== Classifications covering the whole of scholarly endeavour ===
- Units of Assessment for the UK Research Excellence Framework
- Rodman Grants Keyword Thesaurus
- Australian and New Zealand Standard Research Classification
- Frascati Manual

=== Classifications covering broad fields ===
- UCSD Science Map
- Medical Subject Headings (MESH) Medical thesaurus

=== Classifications covering entire disciplines ===
- Physics and Astronomy Classification Scheme

=== Classifications covering specific sub-disciplines ===
- High-Energy Physics Taxonomy
