= BAA2 =

BAA2 or Baa2 may refer to:

- Backing Australia's Ability, public policy
- Moody's Investors Service's credit rating, indicating moderate ability to repay short-term debt
- 몢 (pronounced myej), a nonsensical Hangul syllable encoded as Unicode character U+BAA2; see Hangul Syllables
