= Excellence in Research for Australia =

Australian university research assessment process

Excellence in Research for Australia (ERA) is Australia's national research evaluation framework, developed and administered by the Australian Research Council (ARC). The first full round of ERA occurred in 2010, and subsequent rounds followed in 2012, 2015 and 2018. A round was scheduled for 2023, but in September 2022 the ARC announced that this would be postponed as they were transitioning the ERA process to a more robust and data driven model.

In addition to the Higher Education Research Data Collection, which collects statistics about research in Australia, the ERA collects itemised data, with all research classified according to the Field of Research (FOR) classification scheme used by the Australian Bureau of Statistics. ERA relies on committees of academic experts to assess and rate research on a 1 to 5 scale (up to the 2018 round), by field of research and by university, and using a mix of assessment methods appropriate to the academic field being assessed.

== History ==
The ERA framework was established by the Rudd government in 2008, and replaced the Research Quality Framework that had been developed by the Howard government.

In 2009, two trials were conducted for the clusters "Physical, Chemical and Earth Sciences" (PCE) and "Humanities and Creative Arts" (HCA), and reports have been published using this data.

The first full round of ERA occurred in 2010, with its results published early the following year. This was the first ever nationwide identification of strengths and weaknesses in all disciplines undertaken in Australia. Further rounds of ERA took place in 2012, 2015 and 2018.

On 6 December 2012 Senator the Hon Chris Evans, Minister for Tertiary Education, Skills, Jobs and Workplace Relations, announced the outcomes of the ERA 2012 process, with the release of the ERA 2012 National report.

== Bibliometrics ==
The ARC used Scopus as the citation and bibliometrics provider for the 2010 and 2012 ERA.

== Clusters ==
For the 2010 data collection, the Field of Research codes are distributed into the following eight clusters:

1. Physical, Chemical and Earth Sciences (PCE)
2. Humanities and Creative Arts (HCA)
3. Engineering and Environmental Sciences (EE)
4. Social, Behavioural and Economic Sciences (SBE)
5. Mathematical, Information and Computing Sciences (MIC)
6. Biological and Biotechnological Sciences (BB)
7. Biomedical and Clinical Health Sciences (BCH)
8. Public and Allied Health Sciences (PAH)

For the 2012 data collection, the clusters were changed. The SBE cluster was split into two new EHS and EC clusters, and the BCH and PAH clusters were merged to form a "Medical and Health Sciences" cluster. The Field of Research codes are distributed into the following eight clusters:

1. Physical, Chemical and Earth Sciences (PCE) - no changes
2. Humanities and Creative Arts (HCA) - 1202 and 1204 added
3. Engineering and Environmental Sciences (EE) - 1202 and 1204 removed; 1005-1099 added
4. Education and Human Society (EHS)
5. Economics and Commerce (EC)
6. Mathematical, Information and Computing Sciences (MIC) - 1005-1099 removed
7. Biological and Biotechnological Sciences (BB) - no changes
8. Medical and Health Sciences (MHS) - combines clusters BCH and PAH, and 1004 and 17

== Institutions ==
The following institutions are deemed eligible to submit data to the government as part of the ERA initiative:

- Australian Catholic University
- Batchelor Institute of Indigenous Tertiary Education
- Bond University
- Central Queensland University
- Charles Darwin University
- Charles Sturt University
- Curtin University
- Deakin University
- Edith Cowan University
- Federation University
- Flinders University
- Griffith University
- James Cook University
- La Trobe University
- Macquarie University
- Melbourne College of Divinity
- Monash University
- Murdoch University
- Queensland University of Technology
- RMIT University
- Southern Cross University
- Swinburne University of Technology
- The Australian National University
- The University of Adelaide
- The University of Melbourne
- The University of New England
- The University of New South Wales
- The University of Newcastle
- The University of Notre Dame Australia
- The University of Queensland
- The University of Sydney
- The University of the Sunshine Coast
- The University of Western Australia
- University of Canberra
- University of South Australia
- University of Southern Queensland
- University of Tasmania (incorporating Australian Maritime College)
- University of Technology, Sydney
- University of Western Sydney
- University of Wollongong
- Victoria University

== Journal lists ==
The ARC maintains a list of journals that are eligible for inclusion in the ERA. The ARC initially stated that these journals would be ranked using the following "four tiers of quality rating":

A* (top 5%): "Virtually all papers they publish will be of a very high quality"
A (next 15%): "The majority of papers in a Tier A journal will be of very high quality"
B (next 30%): "Generally, in a Tier B journal, one would expect only a few papers of very high quality"
C (next 50%): Journals "that do not meet the criteria of higher tiers".

After the publication of its draft rankings, ERA introduced a form aimed at all scholars who wished to put a journal forward for the list. There were just three conditions for such a proposal: that the journal be "a scholarly, peer reviewed journal with an ISSN", that the person making the proposal state whether he/she was a member of the editorial board, and that the decision remain at ARC's discretion. This consultation procedure led to a significant increase in the number of journals in the final list: for example, Social Sciences and Humanities (SSH) journals went from 10,241 to 12,976. The percentage distributions were not recalled and not adhered to in the final list which was released on 9 February 2010, though the proportion of A* and A journals did not correlate directly with the performance of different disciplines.

These journal rankings (A*, A, B, C) were discontinued for the 2012 ERA process.

== Conference lists ==
The list of conference rankings was released in December 2009. Conferences have only a three level ranking scheme: A, B, or C.

Conferences are only ranked within the following Australian and New Zealand Standard Research Classification Fields of Research:

08: Information and Computing Sciences
09: Engineering
10: Technology
12: Built Environment and Design

As with journal rankings, a prescribed distribution has not been mandated by the ARC. The Deakin ERA Journal Rankings Access website has been expanded and renamed the ERA Outlets Rankings Access website.

== See also ==
- Research Excellence Framework, in the United Kingdom
- Higher Education Research Data Collection
