= Australian and New Zealand Standard Research Classification =

Set of three research classifications

The Australian and New Zealand Standard Research Classification (ANZSRC) is a set of three classifications developed by the Australian Bureau of Statistics to measure and analyse of research and development (R&D) undertaken in Australia and New Zealand. It replaced the Australian Standard Research Classification (ASRC) on 31 March 2008. The ANZSRC is released under the Creative Commons Attribution 2.5 Australia license.

== History ==
The first ASRC was released in 1993 and was in use until 1998. It comprised three classification schemes; Type of Activity (TOA), Field of Research (FOR) and Socio-Economic Objective (SEO). In 1998, a second ASRC was released with a revised Socio-Economic Objective classification that used a different numbering range, and a Research Field, Course and Discipline (RFCD) classification to replace FORs. This revised classification came into effect in the 2000 collection period, which was due on 31 August 2001. The 2008 standard replaced the RFCD classification with a new 'Field of Research' classification that included approximately 40% more classifiers, using a different numbering scheme to reduce confusion with the 1993 'Field of Research' classification.

== Classifications ==
TOA – R&D activity is categorised according to the type of research effort:

- pure basic research
- strategic basic research
- applied research
- experimental development

These are derived from the three types of research defined in the Frascati Manual.

Field of Research (FOR) – This classification allows both R&D activity and other activity within the higher education sector to be categorised. Prior to ASRC 1998, this information was collected using a different set of indicators called Field of Research. It was expanded in order that it can be used within the higher education sector to classify courses, units of study and teaching activity to field, and was renamed Research Field, Course and Discipline. The categories in the classification include recognised academic disciplines and related major sub-fields taught at universities or tertiary institutions, major fields of research investigated by national research institutions and organisations, and emerging areas of study. In the 2008 specification, this classification was again revised and its prior name (Field of Research) was again used. The FOR classification can be mapped to the OECD Fields of Science and Technology (FOS) classification in the Frascati Manual.

Socio-Economic Objective (SEO) – This classification allows R&D to be categorised according to the purpose of the R&D as perceived by the researcher. It consists of discrete economic, social, technological or scientific domains for identifying the principal purpose of the R&D. The SEO classification uses a combination of processes, products, health, education and other social and environmental aspects of particular interest.

== See also ==
- Frascati Manual
- Higher Education Research Data Collection
