= Jim Peacock =

Australian scientist (1937–2025)

Jim Peacock AC FAA FRS FTSE
- Born: William James Peacock; December 14, 1937; Leura, New South Wales, Australia
- Died: October 21, 2025 (aged 87); Canberra, Australian Capital Territory, Australia
- Education: University of Sydney (BSc, PhD)
- Known for: Plant molecular biology research; Isolation of a plant transposable element; Chief Scientist of Australia; President of the Australian Academy of Science
- Awards: Lemberg Medal (1978); Macfarlane Burnet Medal and Lecture (1989); Prime Minister's Prize for Science (2000)
- Scientific career
- Fields: Molecular biology, genetics, botany
- Workplaces: CSIRO Plant Industry; Chief Scientist of Australia (2006–2008)

William James Peacock (14 December 1937 – 21 October 2025) was an Australian molecular biologist who was Chief Scientist of Australia (2006–2008), President of the Australian Academy of Science (2002–2006) and Chief of CSIRO Plant Industry (1978–2003).

== Life and career ==
Peacock was born in Leura, New South Wales and educated at the University of Sydney, where he studied botany and zoology and gained a PhD in genetics. He followed this with post-doctoral positions in genetics at the University of Oregon in Eugene and molecular biology at Oak Ridge National Laboratory in Tennessee, before returning to Australia to work with the CSIRO.

Peacock was a Member of the Prime Minister's Science, Engineering and Innovation Council (PMSEIC) and the National Innovation Council and served on the Australian Research Council (ARC) Grants Committee, the Australian Science, Technology and Engineering Council (ASTEC) and the Academy of Science's Committee on Recombinant DNA Molecules (ASCORD). In 2000, Dr Peacock was joint recipient of the inaugural Prime Minister's Prize for Science.

Peacock was appointed Chief Scientist of Australia on a part-time basis in March 2006, and his term concluded on 31 August 2008. Penny Sackett was appointed his replacement, to take up the position on a full-time basis in November 2008.

Peacock died on 21 October 2025, at the age of 87.

== Honours and awards ==
Peacock had a distinguished career in science and received many honours. He was awarded the Macfarlane Burnet Medal and Lecture in 1989 and made a Companion of the Order of Australia in 1994.

Peacock was elected a Fellow of the Royal Society of London in March 1982, a Fellow of the Australian Academy of Technological Sciences and Engineering and the Australian Institute of Agricultural Science, a Foreign Associate of the United States National Academy of Sciences, Foreign Fellow of the Indian National Science Academy, and a Foundation Member Academia Bibliotheca Alexandrinae. He was awarded the Lemberg Medal by the Australian Society for Biochemistry and Molecular Biology in 1978.

Government offices
Preceded by Robin Batterham	Chief Scientist of Australia; 2006–2008	Succeeded by Penny Sackett
