= ACGR =

ACGR may refer to:

- Acacia greggii, coded as ACGR by the US Department of Agriculture
- Annual compound growth rate
- Association Cantonale Genevoise de Rugby, Geneva
- Australian Competitive Grants Register, Department of Innovation, Industry, Science and Research
- Australian Corneal Graft Registry, Flinders University
