= Office of the Chief Scientist (Australia) =

Chief scientific advisor to the Australian government

The Office of the Chief Scientist (OCS) is part of the Department of Industry, Science and Resources. Its primary responsibilities are to enable growth and productivity for globally competitive industries. To help realise this vision, the department has four key objectives: supporting science and commercialisation, growing business investment and improving business capability, streamlining regulation and building a high performance organisation.

== Chief Scientist ==
The chief scientist is responsible for advising the Government of Australia on scientific and technological issues.

The chief scientist chairs the Research Quality Framework Development Advisory Group, the National Research Priorities Standing Committee and is a member of other key government committees:

- Coordination Committee on Science and Technology
- Prime Minister's Science Prizes Committee
- Cooperative Research Centres Committee
- Publicly Funded Research Agencies Committee
- Commonwealth, State and Territory Advisory Council on Innovation
- National Collaborative Research Infrastructure Strategy Committee

=== Chief scientists ===
No.	Portrait	Chief Scientist	Held Office	Notes	Ref.
1		Ralph Slatyer	1989–1992	ecologist, Order of Australia	
2		Michael Pitman	1992–1996	botanist	
3		John Stocker	1996–1999	immunologist	
4		Robin Batterham	1999–2005	chemical engineer	
5		Jim Peacock	2006–2008	molecular biologist	
6		Penny Sackett	2008–2011	astronomer	
7		Ian Chubb	2011–2016	neuroscientist	
8		Alan Finkel	2016–2020	neuroscientist	
9		Cathy Foley	2021–2024	solid-state physicist	
10		Tony Haymet	2025–present	Oceanographer	

== National Science and Technology Council ==
The National Science and Technology Council is responsible for providing advice to the Government on important science and technology issues facing Australia.

The prime minister, Scott Morrison, and the minister for industry, science and technology, the Hon Karen Andrews MP, announced the new council on 28 November 2018.

The council is chaired by the prime minister, with the minister for industry, science and technology as deputy chair. Australia's chief scientist, Tony Haymet, is the executive officer.

=== History of Australian science councils ===
- Australian Science, Technology and Engineering Council (1977–1997)
- Prime Minister's Science, Engineering and Innovation Council (1997–2013)
- Commonwealth Science Council (2014–2018)
- National Science and Technology Council (2018–present) (As of January 2024)

== See also ==
- Backing Australia's Ability
