= Tony Haymet =

Australian chief scientist

Emeritus Professor Tony Haymet FRACI FTSE FAICD

10th Chief Scientist of Australia
- Incumbent
- Assumed office 28 January 2025
- Preceded by: Cathy Foley

Personal details
- Born: Anthony Haymet; 5 February 1956 (age 70) Sydney, New South Wales, Australia
- Education: University of Sydney
- Profession: Oceanographer chemical physicist
- Scientific career
- Education: University of Chicago
- Fields: Oceanography
- Workplaces: CSIRO; University of California, San Diego
- Thesis: (1989)

Anthony Haymet (born 5 February 1956) is an Australian oceanographer and chemist who has been Australia's chief scientist since January 2025.

== Career and education ==
In 1978, Haymet completed his Bachelor of Science in Chemistry at the University of Sydney before working in the United States at Harvard University, UC Berkeley and the University of Utah between 1981 and 1991. During his time in the United States, Haymet completed his PhD at the University of Chicago in chemistry. He was later awarded an honorary doctorate in science by the University of Sydney in 1997.

In 1991, Haymet returned to Australia and worked as a professor and chair of theoretical chemistry at the University of Sydney, in addition to working at the University of Houston from 1998. By 2003, Haymet joined the CSIRO as its chief in Marine and Atmospheric Research. In this role at the CSIRO, Haymet would collaborate with various stakeholders and institutions to develop and enhance its research capabilities, regarding the ships and buildings that enabled that research to be successful.

Haymet was director of the Scripps Institution of Oceanography at UC San Diego from 2006 to 2012.

Haymet was the chair of the board at the Antarctic Science Foundation from 2021 to 2025, where he coordinated research into Antarctica through organisations such as CSIRO and various universities.

In January 2025, the Minister for Industry and Science, Ed Husic invited Haymet to become the 10th chief scientist of Australia, following the retirement of Cathy Foley.

Throughout Haymet's career, he has been a member of the Climate Change Authority Board as well as the chair of the Oceans Council at the World Economic Forum (WEF). Moreover, Haymet has been a fellow of a number of Australian institutions including the Royal Australian Chemical Institute (FRACI), as well as the Australian Academy of Technological Sciences and Engineering (FTSE), in addition to the Australian Institute of Company Directors (FAICD).

Government offices
Preceded by Cathy Foley	10th Chief Scientist of Australia; 2025–present	Incumbent
