= Elizabeth Finkel =

Australian science journalist

- Other name: Ella Finkel
- Citizenship: Australian
- Education: Monash University; University of Melbourne
- Occupations: Author, journalist
- Spouse: Alan Finkel

Elizabeth "Ella" Finkel AM (née Sher) is an Australian science journalist, author and communicator. A former biochemist, she has been broadcast on ABC Radio National, and written for publications such as Science, The Lancet, Nature Medicine, The Bulletin, New Scientist, The Age and The Monthly. In 2005, Finkel co-founded the popular science magazine COSMOS, served as Editor in Chief from 2013 to 2018 and she remains its Editor at Large. In 2016, she was made a Member of the Order of Australia (AM) for her science communication work and philanthropy. In 2019, Finkel was awarded a Doctor of Laws honoris causa from Monash University and the Medal of the Australian Society for Medical Research. She now serves as a Vice Chancellor's Fellow at La Trobe University and on advisory committees for La Trobe University Press, the ARC Centre of Excellence for Australian Biodiversity and Heritage (CABAH) and the Melbourne Zoo.

== Education ==
Born in 1956 in Warsaw, Poland, Finkel migrated to Melbourne with her family in 1957. She attended Princess Hill Primary School in North Carlton; St Kilda Park Primary School, Caulfield Central; and Mac.Robertson Girls' High School.

In 1978, she completed a Bachelor of Science with Honours at Monash University, with a thesis on ‘Regulation of the mitochondrial genome’. Finkel then started a PhD in biochemistry at University of Melbourne's Department of Medicine titled "Studies of the 1,25 dihydroxyvitamin D3 receptor".

In post-doctoral research, she spent one year in John Baxter's laboratory at the University of California San Francisco (UCSF), working on the regulation of the human growth hormone gene. This was followed by four years in Patrick H. O'Farrell's laboratory at UCSF, investigating the genes that sculpt a fruit fly egg into an embryo – work that was published in Nature.

== Personal life ==
Finkel has been married to neuroscientist, entrepreneur and former Chief Scientist of Australia Alan Finkel since 1982. They have two sons and live in Melbourne. Through the A & E Finkel Foundation the Finkels support diverse projects centred around education, research and quality journalism.

== Selected awards ==
- 1994 Michael Daley Award for best radio feature broadcast on Ockham’s Razor: "Nitric Oxide"
- 2005: Winner of the Queensland Premier's Literary Award for Best Science Writer, for Stem Cells: controversy at the frontiers of science
- 2005: Eureka Award finalist for promoting the public understanding of science, for Stem Cells: controversy at the frontiers of science
- 2007: Winner Bell Award for best Analytical Writer
- 2007: Winner Bell Award for best Feature
- 2010: Shortlisted for the Queensland Premier's Literary Award for "The Trouble with Genes" and "Black Harvest" published in Cosmos
- 2011: National Press Club's Higher Education Journalist of the Year
- 2015: Eureka Award for Science Journalism for "A statin a day", Cosmos
- 2016: Order of Australia (AM)
- 2019: Doctor of Laws honoris causa from Monash University
- 2019: Medal of the Australian Society for Medical Research

== Selected publications ==
=== Books ===
- Stem Cells: controversies at the frontiers of science
- The Genome Generation
- The Best Australian Science Writing 2012 (editor)
- Prove It: A Scientific Guide for the Post-Truth Era

=== Articles ===
- 2021 "Countdown to iBlastoids", The Monthly
- 2019 "Chasing the miracle of gene therapy", The Monthly
- 2018 "Lines in the sand: Coming to terms with Patricia Piccinini"
- "Two-tiered regulation of spatially patterned engrailed gene expression during Drosophila embryogenesis", Nature, 1988
