= Applied science =

Practical application of scientific knowledge

Applied science is the application of the scientific method and scientific knowledge to attain practical goals. It includes a broad range of disciplines, such as engineering and medicine. Applied science is often contrasted with basic science, which is focused on advancing scientific theories and laws that explain and predict natural or other phenomena.

There are applied natural sciences, as well as applied formal and social sciences. Examples of applied science include genetic epidemiology, which applies statistics and probability theory, and applied psychology, including criminology.

== Applied research ==
Applied research is the use of empirical methods to collect data for practical purposes. It accesses and uses accumulated theories, knowledge, methods, and techniques for a specific state, business, or client-driven purpose. In contrast to engineering, applied research does not include analyses or optimization of business, economics, and costs. Applied research can be better understood in any area when contrasted with basic or pure research. Basic geographical research strives to create new theories and methods that aid in explaining the processes that shape the spatial structure of physical or human environments. By contrast, applied research utilizes existing geographical theories and methods to comprehend and address particular empirical issues. Applied research usually has specific commercial objectives related to products, procedures, or services. The comparison of pure research and applied research provides a basic framework and direction for businesses to follow.

Applied research deals with solving practical problems and generally employs empirical methodologies. Because applied research takes place in real- world settings, strict research protocols may need to be relaxed. For example, it may be impossible to use a random sample. Thus, transparency in the methodology is crucial. Implications for the interpretation of results brought about by relaxing an otherwise strict canon of methodology should also be considered.

Applied research also applies the natural sciences to human conditions:

- Action research: aids firms in identifying workable solutions to issues influencing them.
- Evaluation research: researchers examine available data to assist clients in making wise judgments.
- Industrial research: create new goods/services that will satisfy the demands of a target market. (Industrial development would be scaling up production of the new goods/services for mass consumption to satisfy the economic demand of the customers while maximizing the ratio of the good/service output rate to resource input rate, the ratio of good/service revenue to material & energy costs, and the good/service quality. Industrial development would be considered engineering. Industrial development would fall outside the scope of applied research.)
- Gauging research: A type of evaluation research that uses a logic of rating to assess a process or program. It is a type of normative assessment and used in accreditation, hiring decisions and process evaluation. It uses standards or the practical ideal type and is associated with deductive qualitative research.

Since applied research has a provisional close-to-the-problem and close-to-the-data orientation, it may also use a more provisional conceptual framework, such as working hypotheses or pillar questions. The OECD's Frascati Manual describes applied research as one of the three forms of research, along with basic research and experimental development.

Due to its practical focus, applied research information is typically found in the literature associated with individual disciplines.

== Branches ==
Applied research is a method of problem-solving and is used in areas of science such as applied psychology. Applied psychology uses information about human behavior to identify a main focus in an area that can contribute to finding a resolution. More specifically, it is applied in the area of criminal psychology. Knowledge obtained from applied research is used to study criminals and their behavior in order to apprehend them. The research also extends to criminal investigations. In this area, research methods draw on the scientific method and the social research designs used in criminological research, as well as on law, policy, and criminological theory.

Engineering is the practice of using natural science, mathematics, and the engineering design process to solve technical problems, increase efficiency and productivity, and improve systems. The discipline of engineering encompasses a broad range of more specialized fields of engineering, each with a more specific emphasis on particular areas of applied mathematics, applied science, and types of application. Engineering is often characterized as having four main branches: chemical engineering, civil engineering, electrical engineering, and mechanical engineering. Some scientific subfields used by engineers include thermodynamics, heat transfer, fluid mechanics, statics, dynamics, mechanics of materials, kinematics, electromagnetism, materials science, earth sciences, and engineering physics.

Medical sciences, such as medical microbiology, pharmaceutical research, and clinical virology, are applied sciences that apply biology and chemistry to medicine.

Food science is also a branch of applied science.

== In education ==
In Canada, the Netherlands, and other places, the Bachelor of Applied Science (BASc) is sometimes equivalent to the Bachelor of Engineering and is classified as a professional degree. This reflects an earlier era in which applied science included boiler making, surveying, and engineering. There are also Bachelor of Applied Science degrees in Child Studies. The BASc tends to focus more on the application of the engineering sciences. In Australia and New Zealand, this degree is awarded in various fields of study and is considered a highly specialized professional degree.

In the United Kingdom's educational system, Applied Science refers to a suite of "vocational" science qualifications that run alongside "traditional" General Certificate of Secondary Education or A-Level Sciences. Applied Science courses generally contain more coursework (also known as portfolio or internally assessed work) compared to their traditional counterparts. These are an evolution of the GNVQ qualifications offered up to 2005. These courses have regularly come under scrutiny and were due for review following the 2011 Wolf Report; however, others have argued for their merits.

In the United States, The College of William & Mary offers an undergraduate minor as well as Master of Science and Doctor of Philosophy degrees in "applied science". Courses and research cover varied fields, including neuroscience, optics, materials science and engineering, nondestructive testing, and nuclear magnetic resonance. University of Nebraska–Lincoln offers a Bachelor of Science in applied science, an online completion Bachelor of Science in applied science, and a Master of Applied Science. Coursework is centered on science, agriculture, and natural resources with a wide range of options, including ecology, food genetics, entrepreneurship, economics, policy, animal science, and plant science. In New York City, the Bloomberg administration awarded the consortium of Cornell-Technion $100 million in City capital to construct the universities' proposed Applied Sciences campus on Roosevelt Island.

== See also ==
- Applied mathematics
- Basic research
- Exact sciences
- Hard and soft science
- Invention
- Secondary research
