= Climate Change: Global Risks, Challenges and Decisions =

Climate Change: Global Risks, Challenges and Decisions was a conference on Climate Change held at the Bella Center by the University of Copenhagen. The event was organised with the assistance of other universities in the International Alliance of Research Universities. The stated aim of the conference was to provide "a summary of existing scientific knowledge two years after the last IPCC report." The conference took place on 10–12 March 2009.

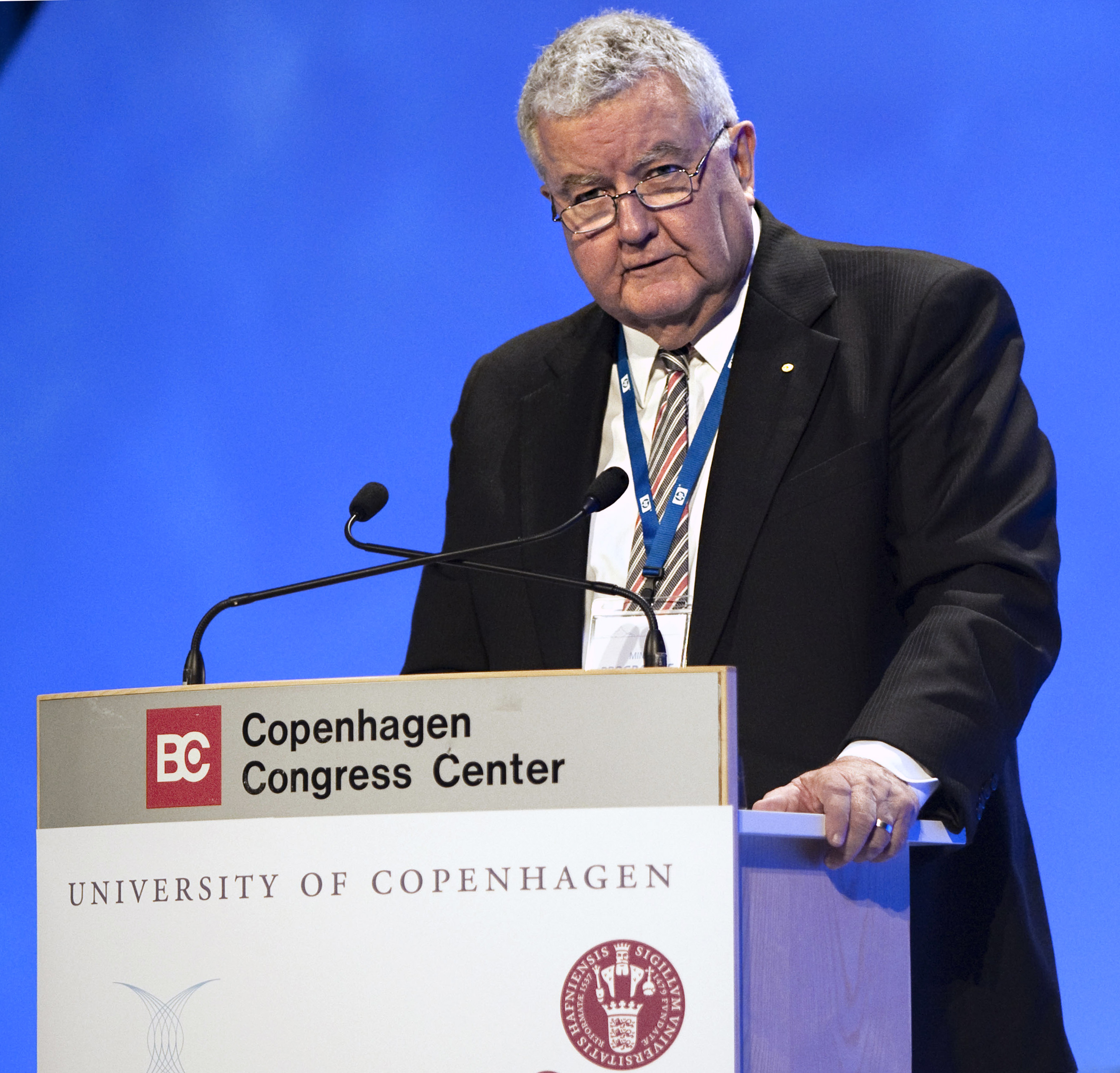
Ian Chubb at the opening session of the conference

== Notable speakers ==
The conference advertised the following notable speakers:

- Dr. Rajendra K. Pachauri, Chairman of the Intergovernmental Panel on Climate Change (IPCC)
- Professor Nicholas Stern, author of the prominent Stern report.
- Professor Daniel Kammen, Professor of Energy at the University of California, Berkeley and climate advisor to the Obama Administration.
- Connie Hedegaard, Danish Ministry of Climate and Energy.
- Anders Fogh Rasmussen, Danish Prime Minister
- José Manuel Barroso, 11th President of the European Commission (did not speak)
- Ian Chubb, president of Australian National University

== Political significance ==
The conference occurred approximately 9 months prior to the 2009 United Nations Climate Change Conference talks (COP15), also in Copenhagen. The Danish government will submit the results of the scientific congress to decision makers at COP15, with the stated intention of scientifically informing the political COP15 negotiations.

== Key messages ==
Plenary speakers frequently likened global warming to playing Russian roulette. The "Congress' Scientific Writing Team" summarised the findings of the science in six preliminary messages.

=== Climatic trends ===
Recent observations confirm that, given high rates of observed emissions, the worst-case IPCC scenario trajectories (or even worse) are being realised. For many key parameters, the climate system is already moving beyond the patterns of natural variability within which our society and economy have developed and thrived. These parameters include global mean surface temperature, sea-level rise, ocean and ice sheet dynamics, ocean acidification, and extreme climatic events. There is a significant risk that many of the trends will accelerate, leading to an increasing risk of abrupt or irreversible climatic shifts.

=== Social disruption ===
The research community is providing much more information to support discussions on dangerous climate change. Recent observations show that societies are highly vulnerable to even modest levels of climate change, with poor nations and communities particularly at risk. Temperature rises above 2°C will be very difficult for contemporary societies to cope with, and will increase the level of climate disruption through the rest of the century.

=== Long-term strategy ===
Rapid, sustained, and effective mitigation based on coordinated global and regional action is required to avoid dangerous climate change regardless of how it is defined. Weaker targets for 2020 increase the risk of crossing tipping points and make the task of meeting 2050 targets more difficult. Delay in initiating effective mitigation actions increases significantly the long-term social and economic costs of both adaptation and mitigation.

=== Equity dimensions ===
Climate change is having, and will have, strongly differential effects on people within and between countries and regions, on this generation and future generations, and on human societies and the natural world. An effective, well-funded adaptation safety net is required for those people least capable of coping with climate change impacts, and a common but differentiated mitigation strategy is needed to protect the poor and most vulnerable.

=== Inaction is inexcusable ===
There is no excuse for inaction. We already have many tools and approaches - economic, technological, behavioural, management - to deal effectively with the climate change challenge. But they must be vigorously and widely implemented to achieve the societal transformation required to decarbonise economies. A wide range of benefits will flow from a concerted effort to alter our energy economy now, including sustainable energy job growth, reductions in the health and economic costs of climate change, and the restoration of ecosystems and revitalisation of ecosystem services.

=== Meeting the challenge ===
To achieve the societal transformation required to meet the climate change challenge, we must overcome a number of significant constraints and seize critical opportunities. These include reducing inertia in social and economic systems; building on a growing public desire for governments to act on climate change; removing implicit and explicit subsidies; reducing the influence of vested interests that increase emissions and reduce resilience; enabling the shifts from ineffective governance and weak institutions to innovative leadership in government, the private sector and civil society; and engaging society in the transition to norms and practices that foster sustainability.

== Scientific findings ==
Katherine Richardson, from the University of Copenhagen introduced the conference's climate science findings by saying there was "little, if any, good news". Notably however, one paper suggested that the Greenland ice sheet may remain at temperatures far higher than those envisaged by the IPCC, when more advanced modelling techniques were used.

Initial press briefings focused on the increases to the estimates for potential sea level rise expected as a result of global warming, with the session led by Stefan Rahmstorf. Eric Rignot, Professor of Earth system science at the University of California, Irvine, said "As a result of the acceleration of outlet glaciers over large regions, the ice sheets in Greenland and Antarctica are already contributing more and faster to sea level rise than anticipated. If this trend continues, we are likely to witness sea level rise one metre or more by year 2100."

== Media coverage ==
Coverage of the conference was extensive, with the BBC leading its reportage with the sea level rise findings. The Guardian focused on the news that the Greenland ice sheet is expected to be stable at higher temperatures than those envisaged by the IPCC, with additional coverage focusing on the projected die-back of the Amazon rainforest, a story also run in The Times.

The conference acts as a focal point for media coverage of climate science, and significant coverage has been given to announcements made prior to the conference by scientists . The Times reported notable climate scientist Professor Kevin Anderson as saying "We all hope that Copenhagen will succeed but I think it will fail. We won't come up with a global agreement,....I think we will negotiate, there will be a few fudges and there will be a very weak daughter of Kyoto. I doubt it will be significantly based on the science of climate change."

The Observer reported Dr. David Vaughan, of the British Antarctic Survey as saying "Populations are shifting to the coast, which means that more and more people are going to be threatened by sea-level rises." and "It is becoming increasingly apparent from our studies of Greenland and Antarctica that changes to sea ice are being transmitted into the hearts of the land-ice sheets in a remarkably short time,"

== Controversy ==
One of the more controversial aspects of the conference was the inclusion of a panel on geo-engineering. Over 80 civil society groups released a statement against geo-engineering to coincide with that panel. The Statement, which originated at the World Social Forum meeting in Belém in January 2009, asserts that "Ocean fertilization and other unjust and high risk geo-engineering schemes are the wrong answer to the challenge of global climate change."

Seed magazine criticised both the credentials of the International Alliance of Research Universities, and the drafting process for the conference's key messages.

== Fringe sessions ==
The conference included fringe sessions, which were co-located but not part of the official timetable, including one on modelling runaway climate change.

== Co-sponsoring institutions ==
The following institutions are co-sponsoring the event: University of California, Berkeley, Yale, Cambridge University, Oxford University, University of Tokyo, Peking University, Australian National University, National University of Singapore and the Swiss Federal Institute of Technology.

== See also ==
- Avoiding Dangerous Climate Change (2005 conference)
- 4 Degrees and Beyond International Climate Conference

== Notes ==
- List of abstracts
