= Simon McKeon =

Australian lawyer, businessman, philanthropist, and sportsman

Simon McKeon AO FAICD
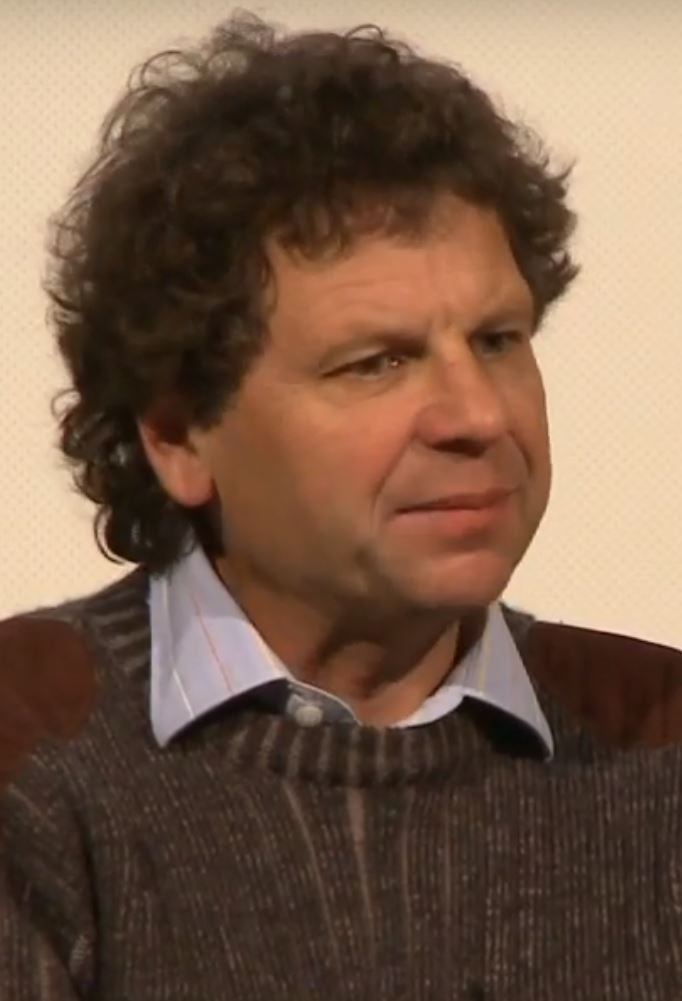
- McKeon in 2011

8th Chancellor of Monash University
- In office 19 April 2016 – 2 July 2024
- Preceded by: Alan Finkel
- Succeeded by: Megan Clark

15th Chairman of the CSIRO
- In office 28 June 2010 – 14 October 2015
- Preceded by: John Stocker
- Succeeded by: David Thodey

Personal details
- Born: Simon Vincent McKeon; 19 December 1955 (age 70) Dandenong, Victoria, Australia
- Spouse(s): Amanda Breidahl (1979–2011); Heather Forbes (2011–present)
- Children: 4
- Education: Bachelor of Commerce; Bachelor of Laws
- Alma mater: University of Melbourne
- Occupation: Lawyer, businessman, philanthropist, sportsman

Simon Vincent McKeon (born 19 December 1955) is an Australian lawyer, businessman, philanthropist, and sportsman. He has been the 8th chancellor of Monash University, and non-executive director of Rio Tinto, Spotless Group, and National Australia Bank. He is retained by Macquarie Bank Melbourne as a consultant and is a fellow of the Australian Institute of Company Directors (FAICD). On 25 January 2011 he was named the 2011 Australian of the Year.

== Business ==
After completing a Bachelor of Commerce in 1976 and Bachelor of Laws in 1978, both at the University of Melbourne, Simon McKeon practised law in Sydney with Blake Dawson Waldron before taking up a post with the Macquarie Bank, where he became the Executive Chairman (Melbourne Office). He was Founding President of the statutory dispute resolution body for Australian public company takeovers, the Australian Takeovers Panel from 1999– 2010. He was also the Chairman of software specialist MYOB LTD 2006–2009. McKeon was chairman of CSIRO from June 2010 until 2015, replacing Dr John Stocker. McKeon was appointed to the AMP Limited Board on 27 March 2013 and subsequently appointed Chairman of AMP on 8 May 2014, replacing Peter Mason. On 26 April 2016 he announced his intention to resign from the AMP board at the conclusion of the AGM in May. McKeon is a fellow of the Australian Institute of Company Directors, and is a member of the AICD Chairman's Forum and is the inaugural President of the Australian banking industry's Review Panel for the Banking and Financing oath. He volunteered as a counsellor for heroin addicts at the First Step Clinic in St Kilda.

== Destruction of Juukan Gorge sacred site ==
McKeon was one of the Directors of Rio Tinto in May 2020 when the mining company deliberately destroyed the Australian Aboriginal sacred site at Juukan Gorge - the only inland site in Australia to show signs of continuous human occupation for over 46,000 years.

Following his role in the controversy and its aftermath, McKeon was promoted from Independent Director to Senior Independent Director, with an accompanying $80,000 pay rise.

== Academia ==
In October 2015, it was announced that McKeon would succeed Dr Alan Finkel as Chancellor of Monash University in January 2016. He has been a part-time lecturer with Melbourne University's Masters of Applied Finance and Masters of Laws courses and has been a member of the Advisory Board of the University's Centre for Energy and Resources Law. He served on the Campaign Board of the University of Melbourne from 2013 until 2015.

In October 2015, McKeon was conferred an honorary Doctorate of Public Health by La Trobe University.

== Honours ==
On 25 January 2011, McKeon was named the 2011 Australian of the Year.

On 11 June 2012, McKeon was named an Officer of the Order of Australia (AO) for "distinguished service to business and commerce through leadership and advisory roles, and to the community as a supporter of national and international charitable, educational and sporting organisations."

In 2014, McKeon, along with Harry Messel, was awarded the Australian Academy of Science's Academy Medal, which recognises scientific contributions other than research.

Awards and achievements
Preceded by Patrick McGorry	Australian of the Year; 2011	Succeeded by Geoffrey Rush
Academic offices
Preceded by Alan Finkel	Chancellor of Monash University; 2016–2024	Succeeded by Megan Clark
