= Cathy Foley =

Australian physicist (born 1957)

Cathy Foley AO PSM FAA FTSE
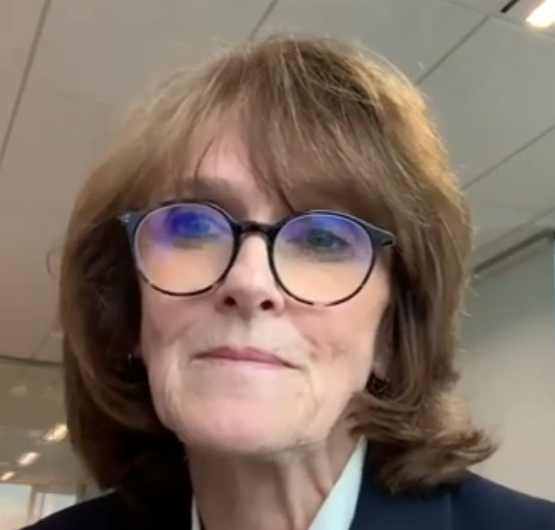
- In an online discussion in 2021

9th Chief Scientist of Australia
- In office 1 January 2021 – 31 December 2024
- Preceded by: Alan Finkel
- Succeeded by: Tony Haymet

Personal details
- Born: Catherine Patricia Foley; 10 October 1957 (age 68) Darlinghurst, Australia
- Profession: Physicist, administrator
- Scientific career
- Education: Macquarie University
- Known for: comprehension of superconducting materials
- Fields: Physics
- Workplaces: CSIRO
- Thesis: Indium nitride polycrystalline thin films (1984)
- Doctoral advisor: Trevor Tansley

Catherine Patricia Foley (born 10 October 1957) is an Australian physicist. She was the Chief Scientist of Australia from January 2021 to December 2024, before which she had been the chief scientist for the Commonwealth Scientific and Industrial Research Organisation (CSIRO) since August 2018.

Foley's research is in solid-state physics and its applications in superconductivity, combining material science, quantum physics, and research translation. In addition to her research science, she has also contributed significantly to the advancement of women in physics, and to professional scientific organisations.

Foley and her group at CSIRO have performed pioneering work on SQUID systems for geomagnetic exploration of minerals, which were transitioned to industry and resulted in the discovery of mineral ores worth many billions of dollars. Upon Foley's appointment as Chief Scientist, the CSIRO stated: "Among her many achievements, her team’s breakthrough work in ‘SQUID’ systems for mineral exploration were commercialised in LANDTEM technology, which has led to mineral discoveries worth more than $6 billion."

== Early life and education ==
Catherine Patricia Foley was born on 10 October 1957 in Darlinghurst.

Catherine was a high school student at Santa Sabina College, Strathfield. She then attended Macquarie University for her undergraduate degrees, studying for Diploma of Education in high school physics (1979) and a Bachelor of Science majoring in physics (1980). She remained at Macquarie to do a PhD in physics (1984) investigating indium nitride, under the supervision of Trevor Tansley. She also spent six months on a scholarship as a research fellow, the Department of Electrical Engineering, at Oregon State University, US, in Corvallis while writing up her PhD.

== Career ==
In December 2024, she was appointed to the Australian Museum Trust.

=== CSIRO ===
Foley joined CSIRO in 1985 as a national research fellow and was promoted to senior research scientist in 1991, principal research scientist in 1996, senior principal research scientist in 2000, and chief research scientist in 2008. Dr Foley was also previously the deputy director of CSIRO's manufacturing business unit, as well as chief of the Division of Materials Science and Engineering in 2011 CSIRO's Materials Science and Engineering division.

Foley joined the editorial board of the physics journal Superconductor Science and Technology in 2003 and subsequently became its editor-in-chief.

Following her departure from the role of Chief Scientist, Foley was appointed to the board of the CSIRO.

=== Office of the Chief Scientist ===
On 1 January 2021, Foley replaced Alan Finkel as Chief Scientist of Australia. She has stated as priorities: development of a national Open Access strategy, supporting emerging technologies (including establishing a working group for quantum technologies), strengthening the role of the National Science & Technology Council in advising the Government, and increasing understanding of scientific capability across Australian public service.

On 31 January 2024, she left this role and later took up a position on the board of the CSIRO.

== Research ==
Foley made significant contributions to the comprehension of superconducting materials and to the evolution of devices that use superconductors to detect magnetic fields and locate deposits of minerals.

At Macquarie University, Foley and Tansley authored a series of highly regarded papers on indium nitride semiconductor films. The work of Tansley and Dr Foley is considered central to the development of semiconductor lasers in the blue-green region of the spectrum.

Subsequently, her work at CSIRO led to the development of high-temperature superconducting Josephson junctions used in high-sensitivity magnetic field detectors used in applications such as underground deep mineral deposit detection.

== Awards and accomplishments ==
Foley's awards include the 2015 Australian Academy of Science's Clunies-Ross Award, the 2013 Premier's Award for Woman of the Year, and in 2011 the AUSIMM MIOTA prize. Preceding this award, she was a fellow of the Institute of Physics in the UK, past president of the Australian Institute of Physics, and a fellow of the Australian Academy of Technological Sciences and Engineering (ASTE). She has been president of Science and Technology Australia, where she represented 68,000 Australian scientists and technologists.

Foley was awarded a public service medal on Australia Day in 2003 and in the same year won the Eureka Prize for the promotion of science. She sits on the Scientific Advisory Committee of Australia's Centre for Future Low-Energy Electronics Technologies.

In May 2020, Foley was elected Fellow of the Australian Academy of Science and in the 2020 Queen's Birthday Honours she was made an Officer of the Order of Australia (AO) for "distinguished service to research science, to the advancement of women in physics, and to professional scientific organisations".

Government offices
Preceded by Alan Finkel	9th Chief Scientist of Australia; 2021–2024	Succeeded by Tony Haymet
