= Higher Education Research Data Collection =

The Higher Education Research Data Collection (HERDC) is the annual collection of research income data from Australian universities. It is currently collected by the Department of Education, Skills and Employment. HERDC data is used in the calculation of research block grants.

It was originally called the Higher Education Financial and Research Publications Data Collection.

Higher Education Funding Act 1988 section 18 outlined the data that must be reported by institutions.

== Purpose ==
HERDC data is used to allocate funding under the following programs:

- Research Support Program (RTP)
- Research Training Program (RTP)

The HERDC Specifications control the collection of higher education research data and are designed to ensure the Australian Government's research block grants are allocated in a fair and transparent way and to support the policy intent of the funding. The HERDC Specifications are updated annually in consultation with universities and other relevant stakeholders.

== Categories ==
HERDC data is collected where it fits within the definitions provided for four categories:

1. Australian Competitive Grants
2. Other Public Sector Research Income
3. Industry and Other Research Income
4. Cooperative Research Centre (CRC) Research Income

Each year, every higher education provider must submit a research income return for the previous calendar year, reporting the research income it received grouped into the four categories, with Category 4 reported for the financial year. The return must be certified as correct by the Vice-Chancellor, and the income in all four categories must be audited by an independent external auditor, who provides a special purpose audit report under Australian Auditing Standard ASA 800. From the 2023 collection, the return is submitted to the Australian Research Council through its SEER system, where the Vice-Chancellor's certification is also completed.

Earlier collections also included a research publications return, counting books, book chapters, journal articles and conference publications. By the 2017 collection, only research income was collected.

== See also ==
- Excellence in Research for Australia
