= John Stocker (scientist) =

Australian immunologist (born 1945)

John Stocker AO FTSE FRACP

Chairman of the CSIRO
- In office 28 June 2007 – 27 June 2010
- Preceded by: Peter Willox
- Succeeded by: Simon McKeon

3rd Chief Scientist of Australia
- In office 1996–1999
- Preceded by: Michael Pitman
- Succeeded by: Robin Batterham

Chief Executive of the CSIRO
- In office 5 March 1990 – 4 March 1995
- Preceded by: Norman Boardman
- Succeeded by: Roy Green

Personal details
- Born: 23 April 1945 (age 81)
- Education: University of Melbourne
- Occupation: Immunologist

John Wilcox Stocker (born 23 April 1945) is an Australian immunologist and the former chairman of the board of the Commonwealth Scientific and Industrial Research Organisation (CSIRO), the national government body for scientific research in Australia. Stocker is a former chief scientist of Australia.

== Education ==
Stocker's undergraduate studies were at the University of Melbourne, completing his Bachelor of Medical Science in 1969, and his Bachelor of Medicine/Bachelor of Surgery in 1970. In 1976, he completed his Ph.D. at the Walter and Eliza Hall Institute of Medical Research in Melbourne.

== Career ==
On completion of his studies, Stocker joined the Basel Institute for Immunology in Switzerland and in 1979 he took a position with Hoffmann–La Roche in Basel. At Hoffmann–La Roche, his first role involved the study of monoclonal antibodies and leading a task force investigating opportunities for scientific and commercial development of biotechnology-based vaccines. While with Hoffmann–La Roche, he would later serve as Director of Pharmaceutical Research. In 1987, Stocker returned to Australia as the founding Managing Director of the commercial biomedical company, AMRAD Corporation Ltd.

=== CSIRO ===
Stocker was appointed the chief executive officer of the CSIRO in 1990 and held the role until 1995. In 1996, Stocker was appointed by the Minister for Science and Technology, Peter McGauran, to the position of Chief Scientist of Australia. The role was a part-time position, Stocker working one day a week. He left the position in 1999.

Stocker returned to the CSIRO in June 2007, this time as chairman. He completed his term at CSIRO chairman on 27 June 2010 and was succeeded by Mr Simon McKeon. He is the chair of Sigma Pharmaceuticals and a non-executive director of the Australian telecommunications company, Telstra.

=== Other appointments ===
Stocker is a Fellow of the Royal Australasian College of Physicians and the Australian Academy of Technological Sciences and Engineering. In 1992, The Australian newspaper named Stocker as its Australian of the Year. He was made an Officer in the Order of Australia (AO) in 1999 for services to Australian scientific and technological research and in 2001 was awarded the Centenary Medal for outstanding service to science and technology.

He is currently Chair of the Science and Engineering Advisory Committee for Environment Protection Authority Victoria.

Government offices
Preceded by Michael Pitman	Chief Scientist of Australia; 1996 – 1999	Succeeded by Robin Batterham
