= Michael Pitman =

Australian biologist (1933–2000)

Michael George Pitman OBE (7 February 1933 – 30 March 2000) was an English-born Australian biologist, who was Chief Scientist of Australia from 1992 to 1996.

== Biography ==
=== Early life ===
Pitman was born in 1933, at the family home in Bristol, England to Percy George Pitman (a butcher) and Norma Ethel née Payne (a milliner). His family lived in Bedminster where Michael attended Southville Primary School in an adjacent suburb. When World War II began, Michael and his mother and brother lived in the village of East Harptree which was relatively safer from the threat of German bombs. Returning to Bedminster, Michael attended Colston's School as his father and grandfather had, although the family's financial circumstances required him to qualify for a scholarship to attend Colston's. Whilst attending a Christian student conference in 1951, he met his future wife, Maureen Room, with whom he corresponded while attending university and whom he married in 1955.

=== Education and career ===
Whilst attending Colston's School, Pitman had achieved high marks in science subjects, particularly in botany, on which he decided to focus at university. He won two scholarships to attend Sidney Sussex College at the University of Cambridge, and he started his studies there in 1952. Graduating with a first class degree, another scholarship from the Agricultural Research Council enabled him to complete a PhD in botany in 1959. He continued to work at Cambridge in teaching and post-doctoral research, and was appointed a Junior Fellow of St John's College.

In 1962, Pitman was offered a job as a lecturer at the University of Adelaide in South Australia, which he accepted, intending to return to England eventually. However, his family found the lifestyle in Australia very enjoyable, and when Pitman was offered the position of Professor of Biology (Plant Physiology) at the University of Sydney in 1966, he and his family decided to remain in Australia permanently.

=== Organisational career ===
In 1983, Pitman retired from the University of Sydney, and was appointed as the Director of the Institute of Biological Resources, one of the divisions of the Commonwealth Scientific and Industrial Research Organisation (CSIRO), Australia's peak scientific body. He became an associate member of the CSIRO's Executive in 1985, and was Deputy to the Chief Executive from 1987 to 1988.

In 1992, Pitman was made the second Chief Scientist of Australia, advising the Department of the Prime Minister and Cabinet on scientific matters.

Government offices
Preceded by Ralph Slatyer	Chief Scientist of Australia; 1992–1996	Succeeded by John Stocker
