= Alan Finkel =

Australian neuroscientist, engineer, entrepreneur and philanthropist

Dr Alan Finkel AC FAA FTSE FAHMS
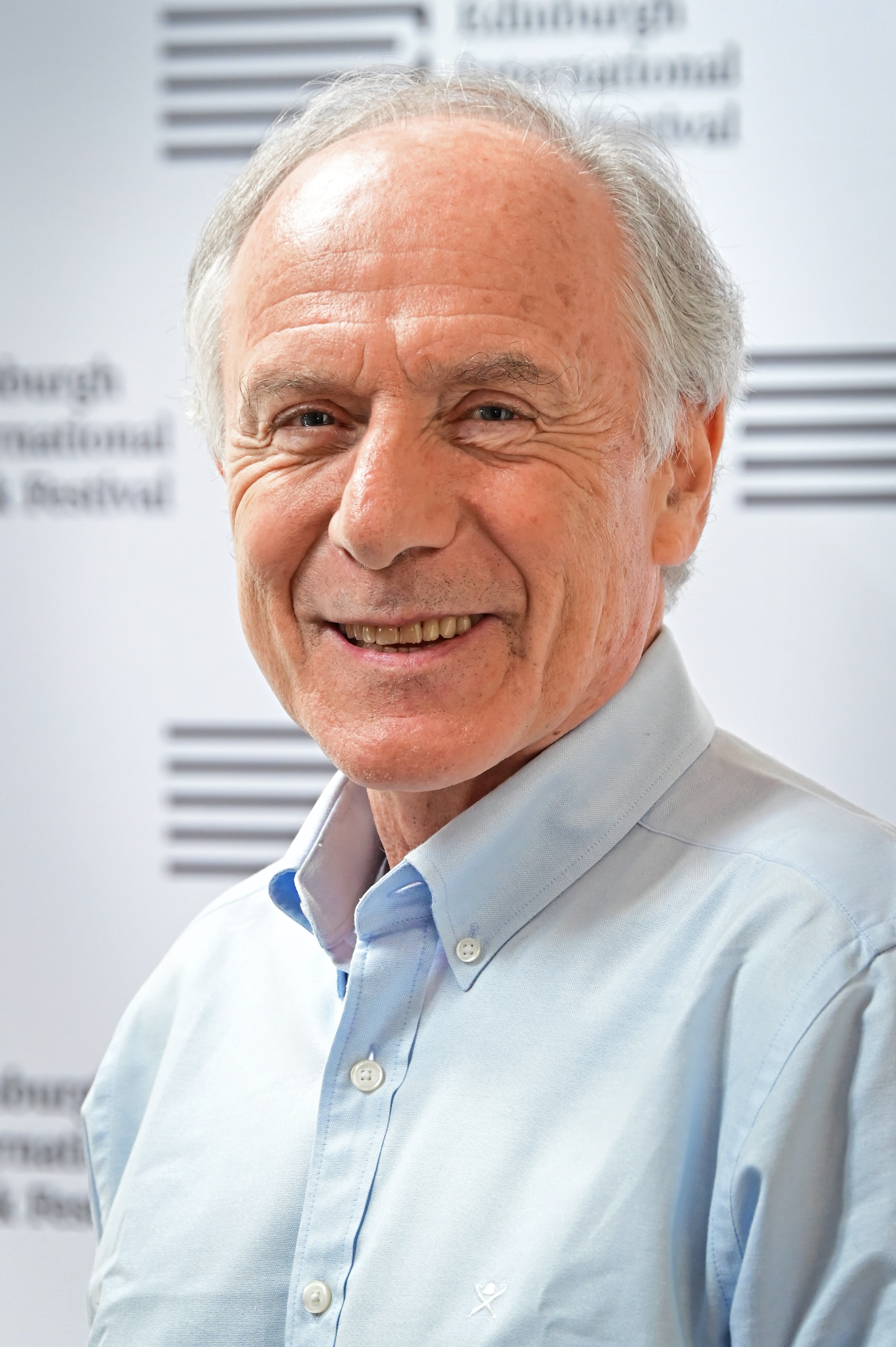
- Finkel in 2026

8th Chief Scientist of Australia
- In office 25 January 2016 – 31 December 2020
- Preceded by: Ian Chubb
- Succeeded by: Cathy Foley

7th Chancellor of Monash University
- In office 2008–2016
- Preceded by: Jerry Ellis
- Succeeded by: Simon McKeon

Personal details
- Born: Alan Simon Finkel; 17 January 1953 (age 73)
- Spouse: Elizabeth Finkel
- Education: Mount Scopus Memorial College
- Alma mater: Monash University
- Occupation: Electrical engineer
- Profession: Neuroscientist
- Scientific career
- Fields: Biomedical electrical engineering
- Thesis: Chloride-selective cholinergic receptor/channels in snail neurones (1980)

Alan Simon Finkel (born 17 January 1953) is an Australian neuroscientist, inventor, researcher, entrepreneur, educator, policy advisor, and philanthropist. He was Australia’s 8th Chief Scientist from 2016 to 2020. Prior to his appointment, his career included Chancellor of Monash University, President of the Australian Academy of Technology and Engineering (ATSE), Chairman and Founder of Stile Education, CEO and founder of Axon Instruments, and CTO for the electric car start-up Better Place Australia.

Since completing his role at the end of 2020 as Australia's Chief Scientist, Finkel has been Special Adviser to the Australian Government on Low Emissions Technologies, Chair of Australia's Low Emissions Technology Investment Advisory Council, and Chair of Stile Education. In March 2021, he published his quarterly essay, Getting to Zero, which received widespread acclaim, and in June 2023 the book Powering Up. In 2025 he founded ProudlyHuman.

== Education ==
Finkel has a Bachelor of Electrical Engineering (Honours) and PhD in Electrical Engineering from Monash University.

== Career ==
=== Research ===
After receiving his doctorate in electrical engineering, Finkel worked for two years as a neuroscience Research Fellow at the John Curtin School of Medical Research at the Australian National University. His research investigated the electrical and chemical transmission between brain cells in mammalian spinal cord and brain ganglia, and he developed a revolutionary measurement approach – the Discontinuous Single-Electrode Voltage Clamp.

=== Commercial enterprises ===
Axon Instruments

In 1983, Finkel founded Axon Instruments Inc, in Silicon Valley, California. A developer of software, electronic precision amplifiers, and robotic screening instruments for cellular neurosciences, genomics, and pharmaceutical drug discovery, Axon Instruments supplied universities, medical research institutes, biotechnology companies, and pharmaceutical companies, predominantly in the USA, Europe, Japan, and Australia. Finkel was CEO from 1983 until the company was sold for $140 million in 2004 to Molecular Devices, and was involved in hands-on design or management of most of the company’s products. Axon Instruments invested in Optiscan Imaging Limited in 1994, and Finkel served as a director until 2002.

Finkel stayed on at Molecular Devices Corporation for 18 months as the Senior Vice President for Global Engineering, the Chief Technology Officer, and a member of the board of directors. During this period he invented the Population Patch Clamp which aided rapid drug discovery at pharmaceutical companies.

Cosmos Magazine

Finkel co-founded Cosmos Media Pty Ltd to publish the science publication Cosmos in 2004. He served as the Executive Publisher of Cosmos Media until he and his wife, Elizabeth, gifted it to the Royal Institution of Australia.

Better Place Australia

From 2009 to 2012, Finkel served as Chief Technology Officer at the electric car charge network company Better Place Australia.

Stile Education

In 2012, Finkel co-founded and Chaired Stile Education, Australia’s leading provider of science curriculum materials to schools. In 2025 Stile Education was acquired by Boston-based Curriculum Associates and Finkel ceased his involvement.

ProudlyHuman

In 2025, Finkel founded and became Executive Chairman of ProudlyHuman. It certifies books, music and art as human-created, to help consumers distinguish AI-generated material from human-originated creative material.

=== Appointments ===
Finkel is a Fellow of several professional bodies, including the Australian Academy of Technology and Engineering (ATSE), the Australian Academy of Science (AAS), the Australian Academy of Health and Medical Sciences (AAHMS), ASEAN Academy of Engineering and Technology (AAET), the US National Academy of Inventors (NAI, Engineers Australia (IEAust), the US Institute of Electrical and Electronics Engineers (IEEE), and the Royal Society of Victoria.

Finkel developed, led, and provided initial funding for the Australian Course in Advanced Neuroscience (ACAN), an advanced, intensive three-week course for young scientists. He also served on the Board and as the Chair of the National Research Centre for Prevention of Child Abuse at Monash University for two years, became the inaugural Chair of the ARC Centre of Excellence for All-Sky Astrophysics, and the Foundation Chair of the Program Steering Committee for the Australian Government’s Securing Australia’s Future (SAF) project. The three-year, $10 million project provided Australia’s Chief Scientist and the Prime Minister’s Science, Engineering, and Innovation Council with evidence to develop new policies. In 2013, he was elected president of the Australian Academy of Technological Science and Engineering (ATSE).

Chancellor of Monash University

In 2008, Finkel commenced as Chancellor of Monash University, the first alumnus of the University to become Chancellor. He held the position for eight years.

=== Chief Scientist of Australia ===
Finkel was appointed Australia’s Chief Scientist in 2016. In that capacity, he provided high-level independent advice to the Prime Minister and other Ministers on science, technology and innovation.

As Chief Scientist, Alan was a member or chair of many authorities and programs, including Chair of the Prime Minister’s Prize Selection Committee; member of the National Climate Science Advisory Committee; member of the Climate Change Authority; member of the ARC Engagement and Impact Steering Committee; member of the National Data Advisory Committee; Chair of the Critical Technologies Advisory Group; Executive Officer of the National Science and Technology Council; Deputy Chair of Innovation and Science Australia; member of the ARC Research Priorities Panel; member of the Human Rights Commission Expert Working Group on Human Rights and Digital Technologies; member of Male Champions of Change in STEM.

Low emissions technology

One of his major contributions as Chief Scientist was to Australia’s energy and low emissions technology policies, with a major review in 2017 into the National Electricity Market and a 2018 report titled ‘Hydrogen for Australia’s Future’. His vision in that report was unanimously agreed to by Australian Commonwealth, State and Territory governments. Finkel has stated that Australia should be open to discussing nuclear electricity as a zero-emission energy source.

COVID-19 initiatives

During the COVID-19 pandemic, Finkel took the lead on three major projects: a strategy to ensure Australia would have enough ventilators to cope with the possibly overwhelming number of COVID-19 patients in intensive care; developing the Rapid Research Information Forum (RRIF), for providing expert scientific evidence to the government in response to specific concerns; and a review of the testing, contact tracing, and outbreak management capabilities of all Australian states and territories.

During his time as Chief Scientist, Finkel also led or co-led about a dozen reviews, reports, or strategies for the Australian Government, covering the research and development tax incentive, national research facilities, the innovation system, education, bushfire climate, and disaster resilience. He also participated in more than 700 public engagements, giving countless speeches.

=== Recent roles ===
At the end of his term as Australia’s Chief Scientist in December 2020, Finkel was invited by the Prime Minister to accept the appointment of a newly created position as Special Adviser to the Australian Government for Low Emissions Technologies, specifically to negotiate mutually beneficial bilateral agreements with the USA, UK, Germany, Japan, South Korea, and Singapore to support demonstration projects for low emissions technologies. He was also asked to continue his role as the Chair of the Low Emissions Technology Investment Advisory Council to develop Australia’s long-term emissions reduction roadmap. He also returned to Chair Stile Education. In July 2022 Finkel chaired an international panel of experts in Sydney at the Indo-Pacific Clean Energy Supply Chain Forum. In 2025 he chaired the Expert Advisory Group for the Australian Human Rights Commission report on Neurotechnology, Peace of Mind: Navigating the Ethical Frontiers of Neurotechnology and Human Rights. He also chairs the ARC Centre of Excellence for Quantum Biotechnology (QUBIC). In 2026 he was the Chair of the Expert Advisory Group on Combatting Antisemitism for the Group of Eight Universities, which delivered its findings in June.

In 2025, Finkel co-founded ProudlyHuman and serves as its executive chairman. The company certifies works as being written by humans rather than AI.

== Personal life and philanthropy ==
He is Jewish, the son of Polish-born Holocaust survivors.

Alan has been married to science journalist and biochemist Dr Elizabeth Finkel AM since 1982. They have two sons and live in Melbourne.

Alan and Elizabeth undertake a substantial donations program through the Alan and Elizabeth Finkel Foundation. They worked with Monash University to support the Indigenous languages’ preservation program at the University, donating more than $1 million to develop the Wunungu Awara program. Their Foundation has also provided major support to the Australian Neuroscience Society, Asylum Seeker Resource Centre, Austin Health’s Olivia Newton-John Cancer Centre, CSIRO, Florey Neuroscience Institutes, the Koori Heritage Museum, Wesley College, Mount Scopus College, Monash bionic eye research, various Jewish museums, the Jewish National Fund, the John Curtin School of Medical Research, a Chair in Public Health Economics at Monash University, the STELR innovative STEM-teaching program, various PhD scholarships and environmental projects in Indonesia.

Finkel authored the narration of Allan Zavod’s Environmental Symphony. It was recorded by the Melbourne Symphony Orchestra in 2018, with the narration delivered by Sir Richard Branson.

== Selected Awards and Recognition ==
- 2000: Jack Finlay Award (Australasian Region Board of the Institution of Electrical Engineers – IEE) for a significant contribution to manufacturing in Australasia
- 2004: R&D 100 Award for the development of the OpusXpress parallel electrophysiology workstation
- 2005: ATSE Clunies Ross Award for Commercialisation
- 2006: Member, Order of Australia (AM)
- 2006: J E Cummins Medal, Royal Society of Victoria
- 2014: Officer in the Order of Australia (AO), “For distinguished service to science and engineering, and to tertiary education administration, as an advocate for the protection of children, and to philanthropy.”
- 2015: Winner of the Institution of Engineering and Technology Mountbatten Medal, for his promotion of electronics or information technology and their application.
- 2015: Elected Fellow of the Australian Academy of Health and Medical Sciences (FAHMS).
- 2016: M. A. Sargent Medal
- 2016: Victorian of the Year
- 2017: Doctor of Laws, honoris causa, Monash University
- 2018: Doctor of Letters, honoris causa, Macquarie University
- 2018: Peter Nicol Russell Memorial Medal, the top award conferred by Engineers Australia. Citation includes “His galaxy of achievements is characterised by the extraordinarily broad spectrum of contributions with impact on the engineering profession, technology and the community.”
- 2018: Joseph F. Keithley Award In Instrumentation & Measurement, awarded by the IEEE “for contributions to high-speed, accurate measurement of electrical transmission in the brain and other biological cells”.
- 2018: Included in ‘Top Political Influencer in Business Intelligence in STEM globally’, by Onalytica
- 2019: IEEE Joseph F. Keithley Award in Instrumentation and Measurement
- 2019: David Dewhurst Medal for outstanding service to biomedical engineering, bestowed by the Biomedical College of Engineers Australia.
- 2022: Companion of the Order of Australia (AC) in the 2022 Australia Day Honours for "eminent service to science, to national energy innovation and research infrastructure capability, to climate change and COVID-19 response initiatives, and to science and engineering education".
- 2026: The Alan Finkel Building for Technology and Design (formerly the "Woodside Building for Design and Technology") at Monash University, Clayton campus, named in honor of his contributions as an alumnus and former Chancellor.

== Selected publications ==
- Finkel, Alan (August 7, 2026). "One of science fiction’s greatest writers warned us about AI. Could his ideas help us avoid a dystopian future?" The Guardian.
- Finkel, Alan (2023). Powering Up: Unleashing the Clean Energy Supply Chain [Black Inc. Books], ISBN 9781760644598
- Finkel, Alan (March 2021). Getting to Zero. Quarterly Essay.
- Finkel, Alan (Australia's Chief Scientist); National Press Club Address, Australian Broadcasting Commission, https://iview.abc.net.au/show/national-press-club-address - 12 February 2020
- Finkel, Alan (19 February 2019). "To move research from quantity to quality, go beyond good intentions". Nature World View. 566 (7744): 297. doi:10.1038/d41586-019-00613-z. PMID 30783294. S2CID 67769458.
- Finkel, Alan; Australia. Dept. of Education and Training (2017), 2016 National Research Infrastructure Roadmap, [Dept. of Education and Training], ISBN 978-1-76051-015-2
- Finkel, Alan (2015). "Reflecting on the Future of Work in Australia: Pessimism, Optimism and Opportunities". Proceedings of the Royal Society of New South Wales. 148 (2): 125–133. doi:10.5962/p.361739.
- Finkel, Alan (2014). "Powering up Citations". Nature. 511 (7510): pS77. doi:10.1038/511S77a. PMID 25054856. S2CID 4457868.
- Finkel, Alan (February–March 2014). "Doomsday or boomsday?". Incurable Engineer. Cosmos. 55: 27.
- Finkel, Alan (2007). "Single Electrode Voltage Clamp". Scholarpedia: 18540.

Academic offices
Preceded by Jerry Ellis	7th Chancellor of Monash University; 2008–2016	Succeeded by Simon McKeon
Government offices
Preceded by Ian Chubb	8th Chief Scientist of Australia; 2016–2020	Succeeded by Cathy Foley
