= Penny Sackett =

Australian astronomer

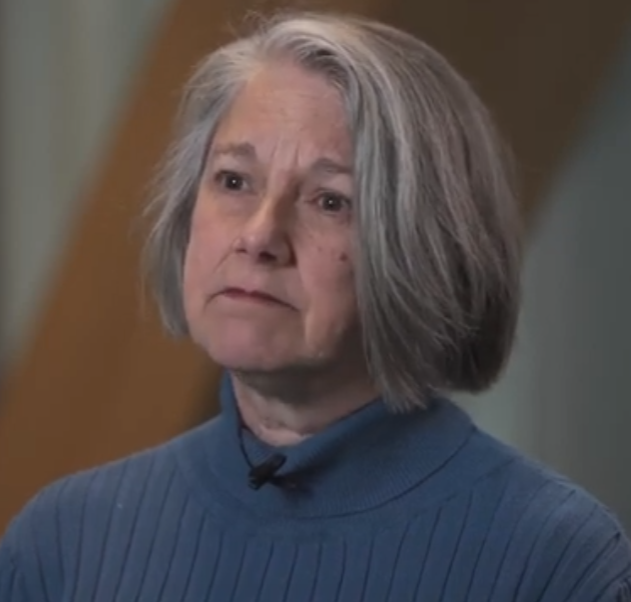
- In an ANU video in 2023
- Born: 28 February 1956 (age 70); Lincoln, Nebraska, US
- Education: University of Pittsburgh
- Known for: work on a microlensing technique to hunt for extrasolar planets
- Scientific career
- Fields: Astronomy
- Workplaces: Australian National University

Penny Diane Sackett (born 28 February 1956) is an American-born Australian astronomer and former director of the Research School of Astronomy and Astrophysics (RSAA) at the Australian National University (ANU). Professor Sackett was the Chief Scientist of Australia from November 2008 until March 2011.

== Early life and studies ==
Born in Lincoln, Nebraska – the daughter of an accountant and a business machine technician – Sackett spent her childhood in Omaha. She was interested in science from a very young age, and her original inclination was towards biology and medicine. While initially unenthusiastic about physics, Sackett developed a passion for the discipline through being mentored by her high school physics teacher.

Her undergraduate study was at University of Nebraska at Omaha, graduating summa cum laude in 1978. In 1984, she completed her PhD in theoretical physics at the University of Pittsburgh. Her thesis title is Scale Parameters for Finite Temperature Actions of Lattice Gauge Theories Coupled to Fermions.

== Scientific career ==
Sackett worked for a time as a reporter for Science News and in program administration for the National Science Foundation. She has previously held positions at Kapteyn Astronomical Institute and the Institute for Advanced Study.

From 2002, Sackett was the director of the Research School of Astronomy and Astrophysics (a part of ANU) for five years until standing down to concentrate on mentoring and research. In her role as director, Sackett was responsible for the management of Mount Stromlo Observatory in Canberra and Siding Spring Observatory in Coonabarabran, New South Wales. As director of the Mount Stromlo observatory, she was responsible for its reconstruction after the 2003 Canberra bushfires. The reconstruction work proved difficult due to disagreements with the insurers and was further complicated by the heritage status of the observatory requiring the Australian Heritage Commission to approve all works.

In September 2008, Sackett was appointed the Chief Scientist of Australia; taking over duties in November 2008. Announcing her appointment, the Minister for Innovation, Industry, Science and Research, Senator Kim Carr said Sackett is "an accomplished cross-disciplinary scientist with a record of academic excellence on three continents ... highly respected in the national and international communities of science and technology, both for her research and her proven experience in research management." After commencing her work at the Office of the Chief Scientist, she remained an adjunct professor at the ANU and continue to supervise research students. Sackett was the first full-time Chief Scientist since the role was downgraded to a part-time position in 1996. On 18 February 2011, in a letter to fellow scientists, Sackett announced her intending departure from the post of Chief Scientist, citing professional and personal reasons.

== Research and affiliations ==
While a physicist by training and an astronomer by profession, Sackett considers herself an educator by inclination and is certified to teach science at primary and secondary school levels. Her research interests include extrasolar planets—Sackett was an innovative user of gravitational microlensing to search for extrasolar planets—dark matter and galactic structure. In 2006, Sackett was one of a team of 73 astronomers from 31 institutions in 12 countries that discovered OGLE-2005-BLG-390Lb, a small, cool planet orbiting a star in the inner Milky Way.

Sackett is an Elected International Fellow of the Royal Astronomical Society and a board member of the Association of Universities for Research in Astronomy. She is a member of the Astronomical Society of Australia, the American Astronomical Society, the International Astronomical Union and the Association for Women in Science. She is a member of the board of directors of the Giant Magellan Telescope project. In 1995, Sackett and Kailash Sahu founded the Probing Lensing Anomalies Network (PLANET) collaboration. Sackett is one of seven women chosen by the Office of the Status of Women to act as an ambassador to promote science to secondary school students.

== See also ==
- Timeline of women in science

Government offices
Preceded by Jim Peacock	Chief Scientist of Australia; 2008–2011	Succeeded by Ian Chubb
