= Katherine Richardson Christensen =

American-born oceanographer

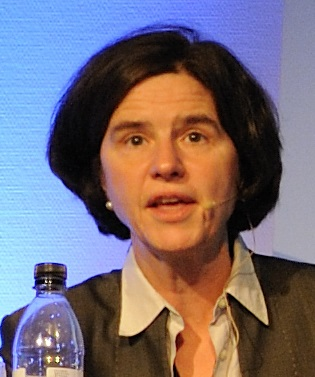
- Katherine Richardson (2009)
- Born: May 11, 1954 (age 72); Chicago, Illinois
- Education: Harvard University; University of North Wales, UK
- Occupation: Oceanographer

Katherine Richardson Christensen (born May 11, 1954 in Chicago, Illinois) is Professor in Biological Oceanography, leader of the Sustainability Science Centre and a researcher for the Center for Macroecology, Evolution and Climate at the University of Copenhagen. She was the vice dean of the Faculty of Science from 2007–2012. Her research focuses on the importance of biological processes in the ocean for the uptake of carbon dioxide from the atmosphere and how ocean biology, including diversity, contributes to ocean function in the Earth System.

Katherine was one of the main organisers of the scientific conference "Climate Change: Global Risks, Challenges and Decisions", which sought to inform the 2010 United Nations Climate Change Conference.

== Life and work ==
She completed a B.A. at Harvard University in 1976 and completed a Ph.D. in Marine Science from University of North Wales, UK 1980.

Katherine Richardson was Chairman of the Danish Commission on Climate Change Policy that reported in 2010 and presented a roadmap for how Denmark can become independent of fossil fuels by 2050. She is at present a member of the Danish Climate Council and was a member of the 15-person Independent Group of Scientists appointed by Ban Ki Moon to draft the 2019 UN Global Sustainable Development Report. She is Co-Editor in Chief of the Marine Ecology Progress Series and a member of the editorial board for Global Sustainability. Authorship of books includes Our Threatened Oceans (2008) with Stefan Rahmstorf and Climate Change: Global Risks, Challenges and Decisions (2014) together with Will Steffen, Diana Liverman and others. She is or has been a member or chair of numerous national and international committees and organisations relating to science policy and/or sustainability. She is currently co-chair of the Northern European Sustainable Development Solutions Network (SDSN).

== Honors ==
- Marshall Scholarship
- Danish Order of the Dannebrog
