= Frascati Manual =

Research methods manual

The Frascati Manual is a document setting forth the methodology for collecting statistics about research and development. The Manual was prepared and published by the Organisation for Economic Co-operation and Development.

== Contents ==
The Frascati Manual classifies budgets according to what is done, what is studied, and who is studying it. For example, an oral history project conducted by a religious organization would be classified as being basic research, in the field of humanities (the sub-category of history), and performed by a non-governmental, non-profit organization.

=== Three forms of research ===
The manual gives definitions for: basic research, applied research, Research and development; research personnel: researchers, technicians, auxiliary personnel.

The Frascati Manual classifies research into three categories:

- Basic research is experimental or theoretical work undertaken primarily to acquire new knowledge of the underlying foundations of phenomena and observable facts, without any particular application or use in view.
- Applied research is original investigation undertaken in order to acquire new knowledge. It is, however, directed primarily towards a specific, practical aim or objective.
- Experimental development is systematic work, drawing on knowledge gained from research and practical experience and producing additional knowledge, which is directed to producing new products or processes or to improving existing products or processes.

These involve novelty, creativity, uncertainty, systematic, and reproducibility and transferability.

=== Research areas ===
It also organizes the fields of scholarly research endeavors, from mathematics to literature, into main and sub-categories. The 2002 Frascati Manual included a 'Field of Science' (FOS) classification. After several reviews, a Revised Fields of Science and Technology (FOS) classification was published in February 2007 consisting of the following high-level groupings:

1. Natural sciences
2. Engineering and technology
3. Medical and Health sciences
4. Agricultural sciences
5. Social sciences
6. Humanities

=== Industry sectors ===
The Frascati Manual deals primarily with measuring the expenditure and personnel resources devoted to R&D in the industry sectors performing it: higher education, government, business, and private non-profit organisations.

== History ==
In June 1963, OECD experts met with the NESTI group (National Experts on Science and Technology Indicators) at the Villa Falconieri in Frascati, Italy. Based on a background document by Christopher Freeman they drafted the first version of Frascati Manual, which is officially known as The Proposed Standard Practice for Surveys of Research and Experimental Development. In 2002 the 6th edition was published.

== Use ==
The definitions provided in the Frascati Manual have been adopted by many governments and serve as a common language for discussions of science and technology policy and economic development policy. Originally an OECD standard, it has become an acknowledged standard in R&D studies all over the world and is widely used by various organisations associated with the United Nations and European Union. As of 2000, approximately 75% of countries used this method to share information about their budgets.

Over the past 40 years, the NESTI group has developed a series of documents, known as the "Frascati Family", that includes manuals on R&D (Frascati Manual), innovation (Oslo Manual), human resources (Canberra Manual), technology, balance of payments, and patents as indicators of science and technology.

== See also ==
- Giorgio Sirilli
