= Ian Chubb =

Australian neuroscientist and academic

Professor Ian Chubb AC FAA
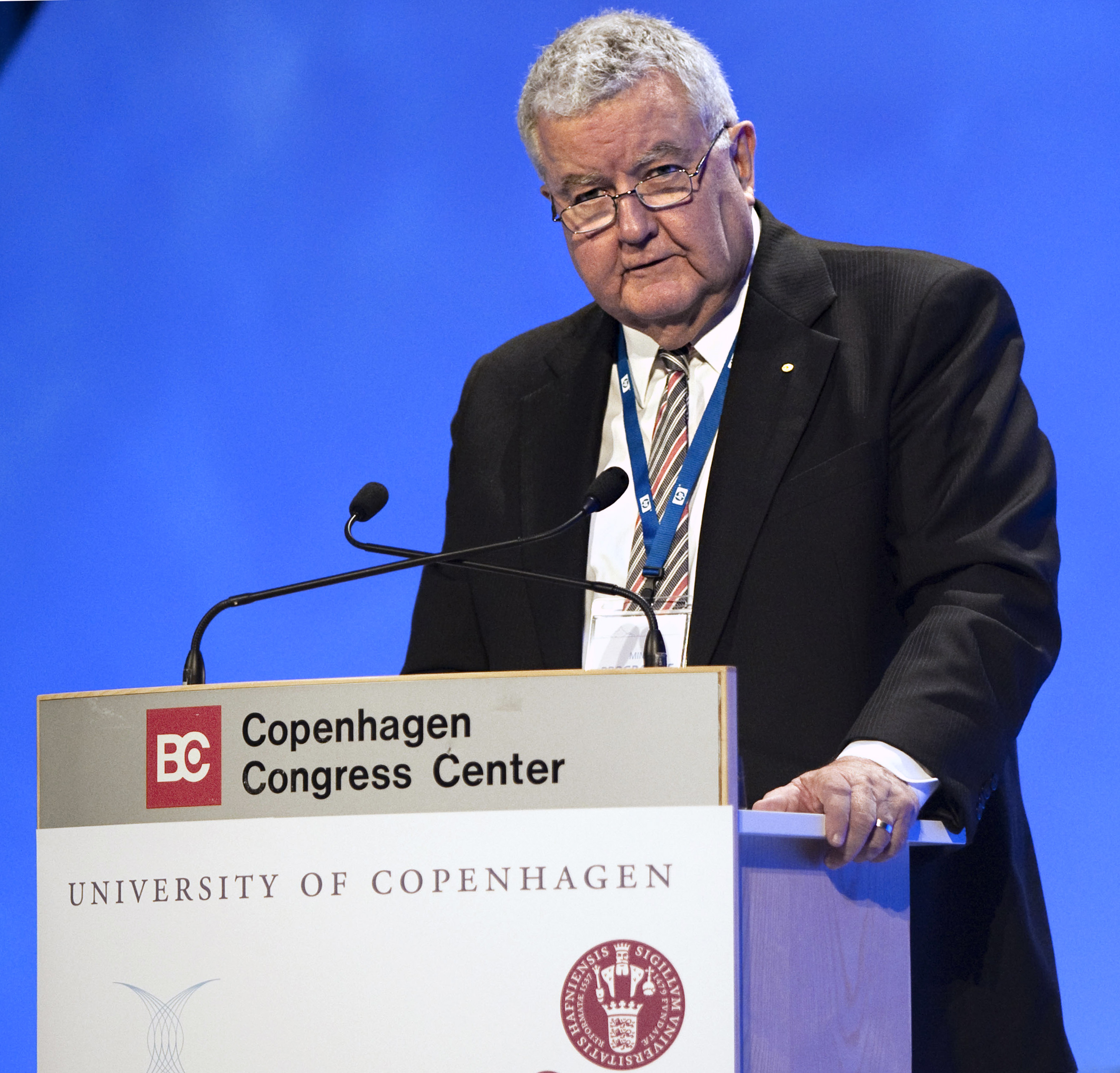
- Chubb at the opening session of the 2009 Climate Congress, Copenhagen.

7th Chief Scientist of Australia
- In office 23 May 2011 – 25 January 2016
- Preceded by: Penny Sackett
- Succeeded by: Alan Finkel

5th Vice-Chancellor of Flinders University
- In office 1995–2000
- Chancellor: Deirdre Jordan
- Preceded by: John Francis Lovering
- Succeeded by: Anne Rosalie Edwards

Personal details
- Born: Ian William Chubb; 17 October 1943 (age 83) Melbourne, Victoria, Australia
- Education: University of Oxford, University of Ghent (Belgium)
- Awards: Officer of the Order of Australia (1999), Companion of the Order of Australia (2006), ACT Australian of the Year (2011)
- Scientific career
- Fields: Neuroscience
- Workplaces: Wollongong (1986–90), Monash (1993–95), Flinders (1995–2000), ANU (2001–11)

Ian William Chubb AC FAA (born 17 October 1943) is an Australian neuroscientist and academic, who was the Chief Scientist of Australia from 23 May 2011 to 22 January 2016.

== Career ==
Chubb has a Masters in Science, a DPhil from the University of Oxford, honorary doctorates from Flinders University, Charles Darwin University, Australian National University, Monash University, Sunshine Coast University and Melbourne University.

He was Deputy Vice-Chancellor of the University of Wollongong (1986–1990), Senior Deputy Vice-Chancellor at Monash University (1993–1995) and Vice-Chancellor of Flinders University (1995–2000).

In 1999 he was appointed an Officer of the Order of Australia "for service to the development of Higher Education policy & its implementation at state, national & international levels, as an administrator in the Tertiary Education sector, & to research, particularly in the field of neuroscience". In 2001 he was awarded the Centenary Medal "for service to Australian society through tertiary education and university administration". In 2006 he was appointed a Companion of the Order "for service to higher education, including research and development policy in the pursuit of advancing the national interest socially, economically, culturally and environmentally, and to the facilitation of a knowledge based global economy".

He was the Vice-Chancellor of the Australian National University from 2001 to 2011.

He is a former president of the Australian Vice-Chancellors' Committee, chairman of the Group of Eight university lobby group, and president of the International Alliance of Research Universities (2006–2009).

In April 2011, Chubb was announced as the Chief Scientist of Australia following the resignation of Penny Sackett from that role.

Named ACT Australian of the Year 2011, Chubb was recognised for three decades of service to tertiary education and university governance in Australia, and internationally.

In 2012 he was appointed a member of the board of the Climate Change Authority.

Chubb's term as Chief Scientist ended on 22 January 2016. Alan Finkel was appointed as his replacement.

In 2022, the Albanese government commissioned an Independent Review of Australian Carbon Credit Units, that reported in December 2022. The independent panel was composed of Professor Ian Chubb AC (chair), the Hon Dr Annabelle Bennett AC SC, Ms Ariadne Gorring and Dr Stephen Hatfield Dodds.

Government offices
Preceded by Penny Sackett	Chief Scientist of Australia; 2011–2016	Succeeded by Alan Finkel
Academic offices
Preceded by Deane Terrell	10th Vice-Chancellor of the Australian National University; 2001–2011	Succeeded by Ian Young
