= Robin Batterham =

Australian scientist

Robin Batterham AO FAA FTSE
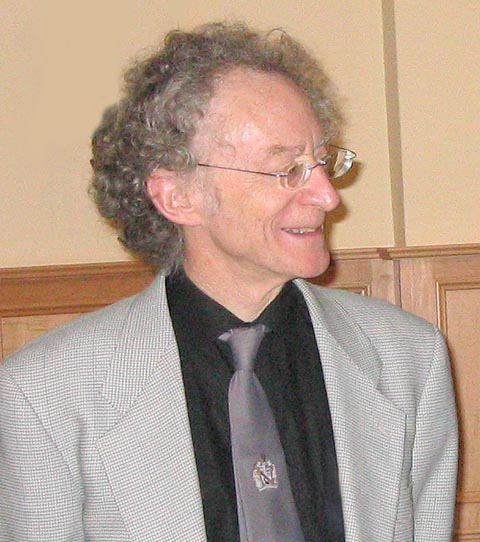
- Robin Batterham, 2005, wearing an IChemE tie
- Born: 3 April 1941 (age 85); Brighton, Victoria, Australia
- Education: University of Melbourne
- Scientific career
- Fields: Chemical engineering
- Workplaces: CSIRO; Rio Tinto

Robin John Batterham (born 3 April 1941) is an Australian scientist specialising in chemical engineering. He was the Chief Scientist of Australia from 1999 to 2006.

Born in the Melbourne suburb of Brighton, Batterham graduated from the University of Melbourne in 1965 with a degree in chemical engineering, and received a PhD from the same institution in 1969. He received a scholarship from the Commonwealth Scientific and Industrial Research Organisation (CSIRO) to undertake postgraduate studies at the central research laboratories of ICI in the United Kingdom. Batterham returned to Australia in 1970, and took up the position of chief scientist of the CSIRO's Division of Mineral Engineering, and was later promoted to division chief.

In 1999, he was appointed Chief Scientist of Australia, a role which he undertook simultaneously to acting as chief technologist for the multinational mining company Rio Tinto. Supporters of renewable energy technologies claimed that Batterham's employment by a mining company made his advice to the Prime Minister on climate change and geosequestration questionable, although Batterham assured his critics that his advice and work as Chief Scientist was neutral and not affected by his Rio Tinto position. In 2004, concern was expressed over Dr. Batterham's dual roles, and a Senate committee found that there was a conflict of interest between the two, recommending that the Chief Scientist position be made full-time. In May 2005, Batterham stepped down as Chief Scientist and took on a full-time position at Rio Tinto.

From May 2004 to May 2005, Batterham was President of the Institution of Chemical Engineers.

Batterham was elected a member of the National Academy of Engineering in 2004 for the modeling of iron ore systems and team leadership in the development of innovative industrial metallurgical processes. He was appointed an International Fellow of the Royal Academy of Engineering in 2004. He was also appointed a Fellow (FTSE) of the Australian Academy of Technological Sciences and Engineering (ATSE) in 1988, and served as its president 2007–2012. in 2014 the Batterham Medal was established in his honour by ATSE as an early career award in the field of engineering.

In 2023, Batterham joined the Alliance for Responsible Citizenship led by Jordan Peterson, which has a membership that includes several conservative politicians and public figures. These include former Australian prime ministers John Howard and Tony Abbott, and the climate-sceptic economist Bjørn Lomborg.

== Personal ==
Batterham is the assistant organist at Scots' Church, Melbourne. He has given numerous organ recitals, and has released several CDs.

Government offices
Preceded by John Stocker	Chief Scientist of Australia; 1999–2005	Succeeded by Jim Peacock
