= Performance Based Research Fund =

New Zealand tertiary education funding process

The Performance Based Research Fund (PBRF) was a New Zealand tertiary education funding process, assessing the research performance of tertiary education organisations (TEOs) and then funding them on the basis of their performance. The PBRF provided NZ$316 million to support the tertiary sector in 2018/19.

The PBRF model had three elements to:

- reward and encourage the quality of researchers— 55 percent of the fund
- reflect research degree completions—25 percent of the fund
- reflect external research income— 20 percent of fund

All New Zealand Tertiary Education Organisations (TEOs) who were approved by the New Zealand Qualifications Authority (NZQA) to award degrees, and also received Student Achievement Component (SAC) funding from the Tertiary Education Commission (TEC) were entitled to participate in the PBRF Quality Evaluation process. In March 2024, the Government announced that the 2025 round was cancelled and all work related to it was stopped, pending a review by University Advisory Group.

== Quality evaluation ==
The major element, the Quality Evaluation, is held periodically. The first was held in 2003, the second, a partial round in which not all staff were required to submit portfolios, was held in 2006, the third in 2012 and the latest full round was held in 2018. Due to COVID-19, the next round was delayed by a year and was due to be held in 2025. In March 2024, the Government announced that the 2025 round was cancelled and all work related to it was stopped, pending a review by the University Advisory Group (UAG). The UAG is chaired by Peter Gluckman.

Each Quality Evaluation assessed the quality of research conducted at TEOs, and funding is allocated accordingly. Quality is determined by an assessment of research degree completion numbers, the amount of external research funding an institution achieves, and an evaluation of the individual research performance of all academic staff teaching on degrees or employed to conduct research.

Each academic staff member was required (with some exceptions) to submit an Evidence Portfolio which records their research outputs, contribution to research environment, and peer esteem. They were then assessed as A, B, C or R category. The A indicated international standing, B national, C local and R research inactive or active at a lower level.

From 2006 two new categories, C(NE) and R(NE) were introduced, for new and emerging researchers who had not yet had the benefit of a full six year census period. Each staff member was assigned a numerical grade (in 2006 5 for an A, 3 for a B, 1 for a C or C (NE), and 0 for R and R (NE)). This was used to calculate an overall score. Since the numerical scores assigned for the 2003 assessment and that for the 2006 assessment differed, the results of the two assessments were not entirely comparable, despite the 2006 assessment being designed to be a partial round.

In assessing individuals rather than groups, PBRF differed from the otherwise similar Research Assessment Exercise (RAE) in the United Kingdom.

== New Zealand universities up to 2012 ==
In 2012, The Victoria University of Wellington was ranked first for research quality. The research rankings up to that year are below.

However these figures are based on the AQS(N) reported average, which measured research quality against the number of full-time equivalent staff receiving an A, B, or C grade. This measure was discontinued for the 2018 round.

Rank	University	2012 Quality score	2006 Quality score	2003 Quality score
1	Victoria	5.51	3.83	3.39
2	Auckland	5.12	4.19	3.96
3	Otago	4.96	4.23	3.23
4	Canterbury	4.79	4.10	3.83
5	Waikato	4.53	3.73	2.98
6	Massey	4.31	3.05	2.11
7	Lincoln	4.02	2.97	2.56
8	AUT	3.59	1.86	0.77
	National average	4.66	2.96	2.59

- Note: the number of staff and the quality score are weighted for full-time equivalents.
- The national average includes non-university TEOs.
- The 2012 rankings used the "new" Average Quality Score, which excluded all R rated portfolios, whereas the 2003 and 2006 rankings use the previous Average Quality Score.

== Other tertiary institutions (2012) ==
Other tertiary institutions scoring above 2.0 in the 2012 PBRF round including Polytechnics, Institutes of Technology and Private Training Establishments are below.

Institution	2012 Quality score
Laidlaw College	3.25
Te Whare Wānanga O Awanuiārangi	3.09
Unitec New Zealand	2.94
Eastern Institute of Technology	2.83
Otago Polytechnic	2.79
Manukau Institute of Technology	2.76
Carey Baptist College	2.73
Christchurch Polytechnic Institute of Technology	2.57
Wellington Institute of Technology	2.51
Northland Polytechnic	2.44
Whitireia Community Polytechnic	2.37
Waikato Institute of Technology	2.36

== 2018 Results (Universities) ==
These results are based on the AQS(S) - average quality, based on the number of teaching and research staff in a given tertiary education organisation, and is now the primary measure of research quality. These figures were reported by the TEC in 2019

Rank	University	2018 Quality score
1	Victoria	29.19
3	Otago	26.09
4	Canterbury	25.92
2	Auckland	24.94
5	Waikato	21.76
6	Massey	19.5
7	Lincoln	17.64
8	AUT	15.78

== Other tertiary institutions (2018) ==
Other tertiary institutions scoring above 2.0 in the 2018 PBRF round including Polytechnics, Institutes of Technology and Private Training Establishments are below.

Institution	2018 Quality score
Carey Baptist College	10.11
Whitecliffe College of Arts and Design	7.4
Good Shepherd College – Te Hepara Pai	5.45
Unitec New Zealand	5.24
New Zealand College of Chiropractic	5.09
Otago Polytechnic	3.8
Laidlaw College	3.05
Media Design School	2.73
Te Whare Wānanga O Awanuiārangi	2.66
Bethlehem Tertiary Institute	2.47
Eastern Institute of Technology	2.35
Waikato Institute of Technology	2.25
