= Australian Competitive Grants Register =

The Australian Competitive Grants Register (ACGR) was a centralised register that listed funding schemes that were approved by the Australian Government as being "competitive research grants" to Australian higher education providers. The ACGR was released for the last time in 2018 and is no longer updated as it has been replaced by a mechanism that allows universities to self-assess their research income.

== Funding bodies ==
The register has included schemes from the following funding bodies and organisations since 2008:

Organisation	Year range	Notes
Commonwealth, by portfolio
Attorney-General's Department	2008–2011
Criminology Research Council	2008–2011
Department of Agriculture, Fisheries and Forestry	2008–
Australian Centre of Excellence for Risk Analysis	2008–2009
Australian Weeds Research Centre	2010
Centre of Excellence for Biosecurity Risk Analysis	2013–
Department of Broadband, Communications and the Digital Economy	2008–2009
Department of Climate Change and Energy Efficiency	2011–	Est. 2007
National Climate Change Adaptation Research Facility	2012–	Established in 2008
Department of Defence	2008–2010, 2013	Scheme was moved from DPMC to DOD in 2013
Army History Unit	2008–2010
Department of the Prime Minister and Cabinet	2011–2012
Department of Families, Housing, Community Services and Indigenous Affairs	2008–
Department of Foreign Affairs and Trade	2008–
AusAID	2008–
Australian Centre for International Agricultural Research	2008–
Department of Health and Ageing	2008–
Australian Centre for Hepatitis and HIV Virology Research	2008–2010	See similar organisation under non-commonwealth
Australian National Preventive Health Agency	2012–	Est. 2011
Cancer Australia	2008–
National Health and Medical Research Council	2008–
Australian Health Ministers Advisory Council	2008–
International Cancer Genome Consortium	2010–
National Asbestos Centre	2008–2010
National Institute of Clinical Studies	2008–	Incorporated into the National Health and Medical Research Council (NHMRC) in 2007
Department of Industry, Innovation, Science, Research and Tertiary Education	2008–
Australian Institute of Aboriginal and Torres Strait Islander Studies	2008–2010
Australian Research Council	2008–
Commonwealth Scientific & Industrial Research Organisation	2008–
CSIRO Flagship Collaboration Fund	2008–
Office for Learning and Teaching	2013–
Department of Infrastructure, Transport, Regional Development and Local Government	2008–2009
Australian Transport Safety Bureau	2008
Department of the Prime Minister and Cabinet	2008, 2010–2012	Scheme was moved from DPMC to DOD in 2013
National Security Science and Technology Unit	2008
Department of Resources	2012–
Australian Renewable Energy Agency	2012–	See below – Previously on the register as Non-commonwealth, under name Australian Solar Institute
Department of the Environment, Water, Heritage and the Arts/ Department of Sustainability, Environment, Water, Population and Communities	2008–
Australian Antarctic Division	2008–
Australian Marine Mammal Centre	2008–	formerly the Australian Centre for Applied Marine Mammal Science
Australian Biological Resources Study	2008–
Commonwealth Environment Research Facilities	2008–
Marine and Tropical Sciences Research Facility	2008–	Core program funding 2006– 2010
Great Barrier Reef Marine Park Authority	2008–2010
National Centre for Vocational Education Research	2008–	Was run under DEEWR 2008–2010
Australian Treasury	2012–
Rural Research and Development
Australian Egg Corporation	2008–
Australian Pork	2008–
Australian Wool Innovation	2008–2009, 2011–
Cotton Research and Development Corporation	2008–
Dairy Australia	2008–
Fisheries Research and Development Corporation	2008–2013
Forest and Wood Products Australia	2008–
Grains Research and Development Corporation	2008–
Grape and Wine Research and Development Corporation	2008–
Horticulture Australia	2008–
Land and Water Australia	2008–2009
Meat and Livestock Australia	2008–
Rural Industries R&D Corporation	2008–2009, 2011–
Sugar Research and Development Corporation	2008–
Non-Commonwealth
Alcohol Education and Rehabilitation Foundation	2008–2010
Alzheimer's Australia Dementia Research Foundation	2012–
Arthritis Australia	2008–2010
Australian Centre for HIV and Hepatitis Virology Research	2011–	Administered by University of Melbourne. See similarly named organisation previously listed under Department of Health and Ageing
Australian Coal Research (Australian Coal Association)	2008–	The Australian Coal Association Research Program was established in January 1992.
Australian Housing and Urban Research Institute	2008–
Australian Institute of Nuclear Science and Engineering	2008–
Australian National Low Emissions Coal Research and Development	2011–
Australian Primary Health Care Research Institute	2008–	Administered by Australian National University
Australia and Pacific Science Foundation	2010
Australian and New Zealand College of Anaesthetists	2008–2010, 2012–
Australian Rotary Health	2008–
Australian Solar Institute	2010–2011	See above
Australian Stem Cell Centre	2008–2012
Australian Water Recycling Centre of Excellence	2011–
Brain Foundation	2008–2010
Brown Coal Innovation Australia	2012–
Bupa Foundation	2011–
Cystic Fibrosis Australia	2008–2010
Dairy Innovation Australia	2008–
Diabetes Australia Research Trust	2008, 2010–
Diabetes Vaccine Development Centre	2008
The Garnett Passe & Rodney Williams Memorial Foundation	2008–
Geoffrey Gardiner Dairy Foundation	2008–
The Financial Markets Foundation for Children	2008–
HCF Health and Medical Research Foundation (HCF Health Insurance)	2011–
The Hermon Slade Foundation	2008–2010
Inner Wheel Australia	2010
JO & JR Wicking Trust	2008–2010
The Judith Jane Mason and Harold Stannett Williams Memorial Foundation	2008–2010, 2012–
Juvenile Diabetes Research Foundation	2008–
Kidney Health Australia	2008–2010
Leukaemia Foundation	2008–
MBF Foundation	2010
Motor Neurone Disease Research Institute of Australia	2009–
Multiple Sclerosis Research Australia	2008–2010
National Breast Cancer Foundation (Australia)	2008–
National Centre of Excellence in Desalination	2011–
National Food Industry Strategy	2008	Disestablished in 2008
National Heart Foundation of Australia	2008–
Ophthalmic Research Institute of Australia	2008–2010
Pfizer Australia	2008–
Pharmacy Guild of Australia	2008–2009
Prostate Cancer Foundation of Australia	2010–
RANZCO Eye Foundation	2008–2010
Sea World Research & Rescue Foundation	2008–2010
Science & Industry Endowment Fund (SIEF)	2011–
Sylvia and Charles Viertel Charitable Foundation	2008–
VicHealth	2011–
Victorian Department of Education and Early Childhood Development	2012–
Victorian Department of Health	2013–
Workers Compensation Dust Diseases Board of New South Wales	2009–

The register before 2008 included schemes from the following funding bodies:

- Australian Dental Research Foundation
- Australian Greenhouse Office
- NICTA

== See also ==
- Backing Australia's Ability
- List of Australian Commonwealth Government entities
