= Fields of Science and Technology =

OECD statistical classification

Fields of Science and Technology (FOS) is a compulsory classification for statistics of branches of scholarly and technical fields, published by the OECD in 2002. It was created out of the need to interchange data of research facilities, research results etc. It was revised in 2007 under the name Revised Fields of Science and Technology, and in 2015 under the name Fields of R&D classification.

== List ==
1. Natural sciences
  1. Mathematics
  2. Computer and information sciences
  3. Physical sciences
  4. Chemical sciences
  5. Earth and related environmental sciences
  6. Biological sciences
  7. Other natural sciences
2. Engineering and technology
  1. Civil engineering
  2. Electrical engineering, electronic engineering, information engineering
  3. Mechanical engineering
  4. Chemical engineering
  5. Materials engineering
  6. Medical engineering
  7. Environmental engineering
  8. Environmental biotechnology
  9. Industrial biotechnology
  10. Nano technology
  11. Other engineering and technologies
3. Medical and health sciences
  1. Basic medicine
  2. Clinical medicine
  3. Health sciences
  4. Health biotechnology
  5. Other medical sciences
4. Agricultural sciences
  1. Agriculture, forestry, and fisheries
  2. Animal and dairy science
  3. Veterinary science
  4. Agricultural biotechnology
  5. Other agricultural sciences
5. Social science
  1. Psychology
  2. Economics and business
  3. Educational sciences
  4. Sociology
  5. Law
  6. Political science
  7. Social and economic geography
  8. Media and communications
  9. Other social sciences
6. Humanities
  1. History and archaeology
  2. Languages and literature
  3. Philosophy, ethics and religion
  4. Arts (arts, history of arts, performing arts, music)
  5. Other humanities

== See also ==
- International Standard Classification of Education
- International Standard Classification of Occupations
- Wissenschaft – epistemological concept in which serious scholarly works of history, literature, art, and religion are similar to natural sciences
