= Australian Science, Technology and Engineering Council =

The Australian Science, Technology and Engineering Council (ASTEC) was an Australian government agency. ASTEC was established in April 1977 as the Australian Science and Technology Council to advise the Australian government on matters relating to science and technology.

The council was composed of leading academics and industrialists, although scientists from other government agencies, notably the Commonwealth Scientific and Industrial Research Organisation (CSIRO), were excluded. In 1997, the Australian Science and Technology Council changed its name to the Australian Science, Technology and Engineering Council. The council was abolished in 1997, and its functions and scope were transferred to the Prime Minister's Science, Engineering and Innovation Council (PMSEIC).

During its existence ASTEC published the following reports and other documents:

- Future Arrangements for an Australian Science and Technology Council - 1976
- Science and Technology in Australia 1977–78: Volume 1A - 1978

The complete collection of ASTEC documents were published on CD-ROM in two volumes

- Volumes 1 and 2
