= Backing Australia's Ability =

Backing Australia's Ability (BAA) was a five-year innovation plan launched by the Howard government in January 2001.

== Previous policy ==
Previous policies for this group of portfolios under the Howard government were:

- Investing for Growth, December 1997 (ISBN 0-642-28095-9) increased support for business innovation by providing $1.26 billion over the four years from 1998–99, including additional funding for R&D grants, venture capital and technology diffusion.
- Knowledge and Innovation, December 1999 announced a new policy and funding framework for higher education research and research training.

== Science and Innovation Committee ==
The Science and Innovation Committee (SIC), originally known as the Ministerial Committee to Oversight Implementation of Backing Australia's Ability (MCOIBAA), is a sub-committee of Cabinet established as part of the initiative to oversee the implementation of Backing Australia's Ability. It is composed of:

- Prime Minister of Australia, chairman
- Minister for Industry, Tourism and Resources, Ian Macfarlane
- Minister for Communications, Information Technology and the Arts, Richard Alston followed by Helen Coonan since July 2004
- Minister for Education, Science and Training, Brendan Nelson followed by Julie Bishop since January 2006
- Minister for Finance and Administration, Nick Minchin

== An Innovation Action Plan for the Future ==
The initiative set aside AUD 2.9 billion over five years 2001–02 to 2005–06, overseen by a Science and Innovation Ministerial Council, chaired by the Prime Minister and advised by the Chief Scientist.

The objectives were:

- an additional $736 million for Australian Research Council competitive grants, doubling funding by 2005–06
- an additional $583 million for research infrastructure
- an additional $176 million for world class centres of excellence in information and communications technology and biotechnology
- providing $155 million to support investments in major national research facilities
- $535 million over five years for the R&D Start Program
- reforming the R&D tax concession
  - a premium rate of 175 per cent for additional R&D activity
  - a tax rebate for small companies
- an additional $227 million for the Cooperative Research Centres Program, and encouraging greater access by small and medium enterprises
- an additional $151 million to universities, to create 2000 additional university places each year, with priority given to ICT, mathematics and science – to be backed by adjustments to existing immigration arrangements to attract more migrants with ICT skills
- $130 million to foster scientific, mathematical and technological skills and innovation in government schools in those States where the Enrolment Benchmark Adjustment (EBA) is triggered.
- $246 million for a new Systemic Infrastructure Initiative, to upgrade the basic infrastructure of universities, such as scientific and research equipment, libraries and laboratory facilities

== Building our future through science and innovation ==
On 4 May 2004 the Prime Minister announced a second plan, subtitled "Building our future through science and innovation", which is referred to as "BAA2".

The objectives were:

- $1 billion for a new Commercial Ready programme
- $542 million for a new National Collaborative Research Infrastructure Strategy
- an additional $305 million for CSIRO National Research Flagships
- an additional $200 million for National Health and Medical Research Council to assist independent medical research institutions
- an additional $100 million or the Commercialising Emerging Technologies (COMET) programme
- $38.8 million for a new Maths, Science and Innovation Teaching initiative that will involve research bodies and undergraduates in primary and secondary school classes
- $7.2 million to co-ordinate and focus research in support of Australia's counter-terrorism needs

== See also ==
- Australian Competitive Grants Register
- Measuring Australia's Progress
