= PMSEIC =

The Prime Minister's Science, Engineering and Innovation Council (PMSEIC) is the Australian government's principal source of advice on science, engineering and innovation issues, as well as relevant aspects of education and training. When PMSEIC was created in 1997, it took over the responsibilities of the Australian Science, Technology and Engineering Council (ASTEC).

PMSEIC meets twice a year in full session and the non-ministerial members of PMSEIC, the standing committee, meet four times a year. Much of its work is undertaken through working groups. These groups are composed of members of the council as well as others co-opted from industry, universities, science agencies and government departments.

The Standing Committee responds to issues referred by the government, or by meetings of PMSEIC, and identifies and develops a range of issues to be considered by PMSEIC.
