= List of ministries of communications =

A Communications Ministry or Department of Communications is a ministry or other government agency charged with communication. Communications responsibilities include regulating telecommunications, postal services, broadcasting and print media. The ministry is often headed by the Minister for Communications

== Ministries titled Ministry or Department of Communications ==
Some countries have such a department literally called Ministry of Communications:

- Australia:
  - Department of Communications (1980–1987)
  - Department of Communications (1993–1994)
  - Department of Communications (2013–2015)
- Ministry of Communications and Transport (Bosnia and Herzegovina)
- Ministry of Communications (Brazil)
- Ministry of Communications (Iceland)
- Ministry of Communications (Iraq)
- Ministry of Communications (Israel)
- Ministry of Communications (Japan), historical ministry from 1885 to 1949
- Ministry of Transport and Communications (Lithuania)
- Ministry of Communications of Morocco
- Ministry of Communications of Pakistan functions as a central policy making and administrative authority on Communications and Transport Sector in Pakistan.
- Ministry of Communications and Mass Media (Russia)
- Department of Communications (South Africa)
- Ministry of Communications (Soviet Union), the central state administration body on communications in the Soviet Union from 1946 to 1991
- Ministry of Communications (Trinidad and Tobago)
- Ministry of Communications (India) (2016–Present)
- Ministry of Communications (Sweden)

== Ministries titled Ministry of Information and Communications ==
A number of countries have designated such a department as a Ministry of Information and Communications:

- Nigerian Federal Ministry of Information and Communications
  - Ministry of Information and Communications (Rivers State)
- Ministry of Information and Communication (South Korea)
- Ministry of Information and Communications (Kenya), Kenya
- Ministry of Information and Communications (Vietnam), Vietnam
- Ministry of Information and Communication (Fiji), Fiji
- Ministry of Information and Communication (Bhutan), Bhutan
- Ministry of Information and Communication (Cuba), Cuba
- Ministry of Information (Sudan), Sudan

== Ministries titled Ministry of Communications and Information Technology ==
A number of countries have designated such a department as a Ministry of Communications and Information Technology:

- Ministry of Communications and Information Technology (Afghanistan)
- Ministry of Posts, Telecommunications and Information Technology (Bangladesh)
- Ministry of Communications and Information Technology (Burma)
- Ministry of Communications and Information Technology (Egypt)
- Ministry of Communications and Information Technology (India)
- Ministry of Communications and Information Technology (Nepal)
- Ministry of Communication and Information Technology (Saudi Arabia)
- Ministry of Communications and Information Technology (Iran)
- Ministry of Information Technologies and Communications (Colombia)
- Ministry of Information Technologies and Communications (Yemen)
- Ministry of Information and Communication Technology (Thailand)
- Department of Information and Communications Technology (Philippines)

== Ministries with other names having authority over communications ==
Many countries have such a department, but under some other name:

- Ministry of Post and Telecommunications (Algeria)
- Australia:
  - Postal and Telecommunications Department (1975–1980)
  - Department of Communications (1980–1987)
  - Department of Transport and Communications (1987–1993)
  - Department of Communications (1993–1994)
  - Department of Communications and the Arts (1994–1998)
  - Department of Communications, Information Technology and the Arts (1998–2007)
  - Department of Broadband, Communications and the Digital Economy (2007–2013)
  - Department of Communications (2013–2015)
  - Department of Communications and the Arts (2015–2020)
  - Department of Infrastructure, Transport, Regional Development and Communications (2020–2022)
  - Department of Infrastructure, Transport, Regional Development, Communications, Sport and the Arts (2022–present)
- Ministry of Transport and Infocommunications (Brunei), renamed from Ministry of Communications since 2018
- Department of Canadian Heritage, formerly a part of the Department of Communications and Industry Canada which regulates the Telecommunications Act
- Ministry of Economic Affairs and Communications (Estonia)
- Federal Ministry of Transport and Digital Infrastructure (Germany), since 2013
- Ministry of Communication and Digital Affairs (Indonesia)
- Department of Communications, Energy and Natural Resources (Ireland), a department of the Government of Ireland that is responsible for the telecommunications and broadcasting sectors and regulates, protects and develops the natural resources of the Republic of Ireland
- Ministry of Internal Affairs and Communications (Japan), a cabinet-level ministry in the Government of Japan
- Ministry of Information, Communications, Transport and Tourism Development (Kiribati)
- Ministry of Post and Telecommunications (North Korea)
- Korea Communications Commission and Ministry of Science, ICT and Future Planning (South Korea)
- Ministry of Communications and Digital (Malaysia)
- Malaysian Communications and Multimedia Commission (Malaysia)
- Ministry of Homeland Security and Technology, including the Communications Authority of Maldives (Maldives)
- Ministry of Economic Development (New Zealand), including Communications and Information Technology Portfolio
- Ministry of Transport and Communications (North Macedonia)
- Ministry of Industry and Information Technology of the People's Republic of China, established in March 2008, is the state agency of the People's Republic of China responsible for regulation and development of the postal service, Internet, wireless, broadcasting, communications, production of electronic and information goods, software industry and the promotion of the national knowledge economy
- Ministry of Communications and Information (Singapore), a ministry of the Government of Singapore. It is in charge of the creative industries, library, media, info-communications and government public relations.
- Department of Communications (South Africa) is responsible for overseeing the South African communications, telecommunications and broadcasting industries.
- Ministry of Transportation and Communications (Taiwan)
- Ministry of Transport and Communications (Timor-Leste)
- Office of Communications (United Kingdom)
- Federal Communications Commission (United States), an independent agency of the United States government, created, Congressional statute (see 47 U.S.C. § 151 and 47 U.S.C. § 154), and with the majority of its commissioners appointed by the current President

== See also ==
- List of postal entities, for other countries
- List of telecommunications regulatory bodies, for other countries
