= Prime Minister's Office (Australia) =

Government agency in Australia

Prime Minister of Australia
- Commonwealth Coat of Arms

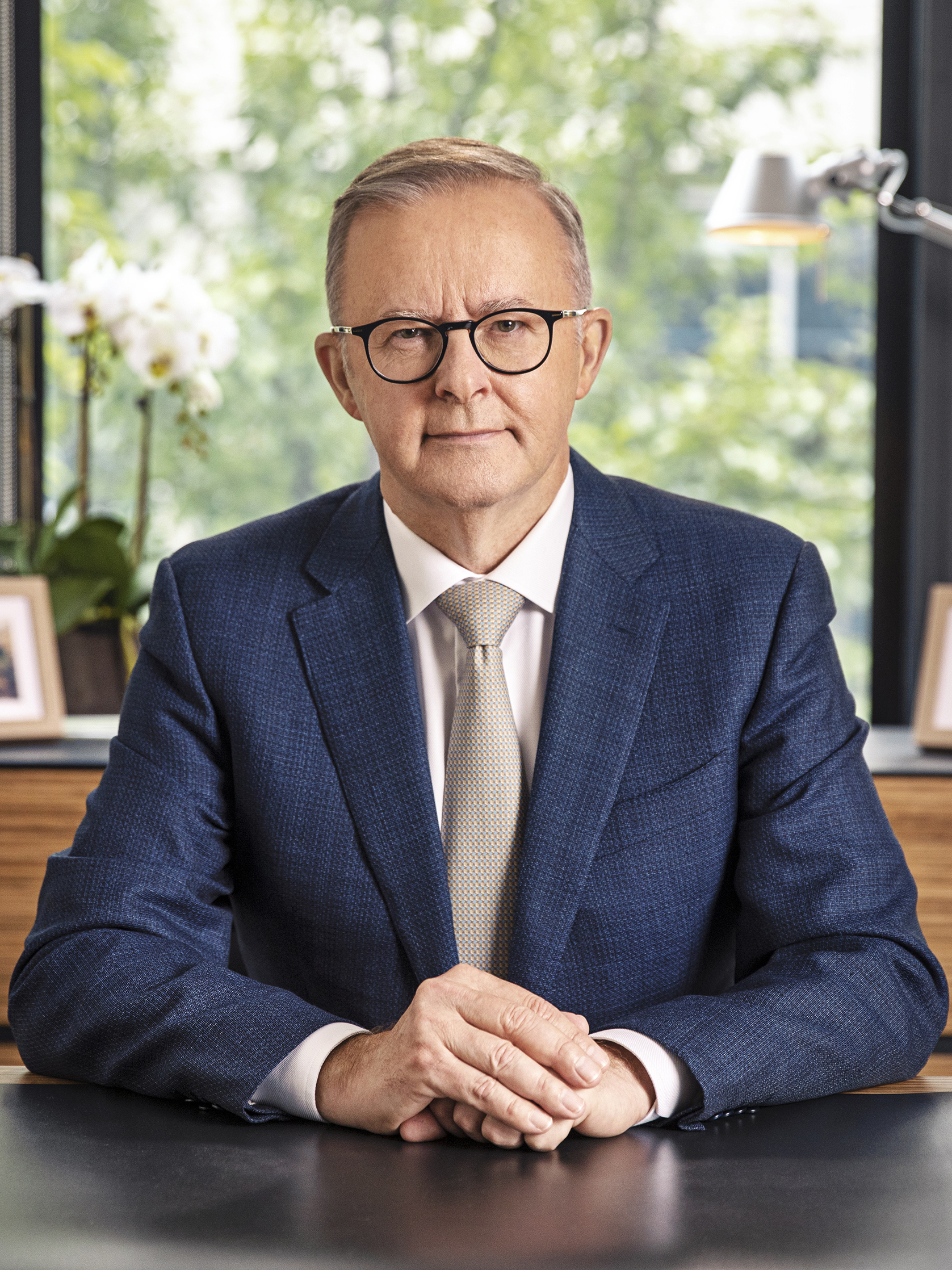
- Incumbent; Anthony Albanese since 23 May 2022
- Government of Australia; Department of the Prime Minister and Cabinet
- Style: The Honourable (formal); Prime Minister (spoken)
- Member of: Cabinet; National Security Committee; Federal Executive Council
- Reports to: Parliament, Governor-General
- Residence: The Lodge; Kirribilli House
- Seat: Canberra
- Appointer: Governor-General of Australia by convention, based on appointee's ability to command confidence in the House of Representatives
- Term length: At the Governor-General's pleasure contingent on the Prime Minister's ability to command confidence in the lower house of Parliament
- Inaugural holder: Edmund Barton
- Formation: 1 January 1901
- Deputy: Richard Marles
- Salary: $607,471 (AUD) annually
- Website: pm.gov.au

The Prime Minister's Office (PMO), also known as the Office of the Prime Minister, is the personal office of the prime minister of Australia that provides political advice and executive support to the prime minister. The PMO is led by the prime minister's chief of staff and or principal private secretary and is composed of ministerial advisers assisting with party politics, media relations, and political strategy. Scholars including Professor Anne Tiernan of Griffith University and Professor James Walter of Monash University have observed the centralisation and expansion of power within the PMO over the past three decades. Scholar Heath Pickering has noted that the Chief of Staff and their cohort of political advisers have become an entrenched feature of executive government, reflecting the broader professionalisation and growing influence of advisory roles in Westminster-style systems.

The PMO should not be confused with the Department of the Prime Minister and Cabinet, which is a public service entity that provides non-political policy coordination and executive support for the prime minister and Cabinet's agenda or with the prime minister's official residences at The Lodge and Kirribilli House.

== History ==
The origins of the contemporary Prime Minister's Office can be found with Prime Minister Malcolm Fraser, who cemented the central authority of the prime minister through an adviser structure. Prime ministers Bob Hawke and Paul Keating also continued to expand the role and size of the Prime Minister's Office through the coordination of the development and implementation of the government's agenda. Prime Minister John Howard further expanded and centralised power within the PMO.

== Roles and activities ==
The role of the Prime Minister's Office has changed over time but has consistently been a source of political advice for the prime minister of the day.

== Structure and staff ==
The organisational structure and staffing arrangements of the Prime Minister's Office changed with the personal preferences, political interests, and strategic priorities of the prime minister of the day. Nevertheless, there has been the trend of the increasing size of the PMO since the Hawke and Keating Governments. Traditionally, the two key positions within the PMO have been the Chief of Staff and the Principal Private Secretary. The PMO also seconds Departmental Liaison Officers from the Department of the Prime Minister and Cabinet to enable engagement for the flow of advice, correspondence, submissions and other communications to and from the PMO and PM&C.

=== Chiefs of Staff ===
The position of Chief of Staff to the Prime Minister of Australia was formally created by Prime Minister Gough Whitlam in 1972 to run the political and private office of the prime minister.

==== List of chiefs of staff ====
- Peter Wilenski (Chief of Staff to Prime Minister Gough Whitlam)
- Tony Eggleton (Chief of Staff to Prime Minister Malcolm Fraser)
- David Kemp (Chief of Staff to Prime Minister Malcolm Fraser 1981)
- Sandy Hollway (Chief of Staff to Prime Minister Bob Hawke 1988–1990)
- Dennis Richardson (Chief of Staff to Prime Minister Bob Hawke 1990–1991)
- Don Russell (Chief of Staff to Prime Minister Paul Keating 1991–1993)
- Allan Hawke (Chief of Staff to Prime Minister Paul Keating 1993–1996)
- Nicole Feely (Chief of Staff to Prime Minister John Howard 1996–1997)
- Grahame Morris (Chief of Staff to Prime Minister John Howard 1997)
- Arthur Sinodinos (Chief of Staff to Prime Minister John Howard 1997–2007)
- David Epstein (Chief of Staff to Prime Minister Kevin Rudd 2007–2008)
- Alister Jordan (Chief of Staff to Prime Minister Kevin Rudd 2008–2010)
- Amanda Lampe (Chief of Staff to Prime Minister Julia Gillard 2010–2011)
- Ben Hubbard (Chief of Staff to Prime Minister Julia Gillard 2011–2013)
- Peta Credlin (Chief of Staff to Prime Minister Tony Abbott 2013–2015)
- Drew Clarke (Chief of Staff to Prime Minister Malcolm Turnbull 2015–2017)
- Greg Moriarty (Chief of Staff to Prime Minister Malcolm Turnbull 2017)
- Peter Woolcott (Chief of Staff to Prime Minister Malcolm Turnbull 2017–2018)
- John Kunkel (Chief of Staff to Prime Minister Scott Morrison 2018–2022)
- Tim Gartrell (Chief of Staff to Prime Minister Anthony Albanese 2022–present)

=== Principal private secretary ===
Prior to the formalisation of the prime minister's chief of staff in 1972, the Prime Minister's Office was traditionally headed by a career public servant known as the principal private secretary. The position of principal private secretary functioned as a chief of staff and has been responsible for the management of relationships and stakeholders at the direction of the prime minister.

==== List of principal private secretaries ====
- Frank Jennings (Principal Private Secretary to Prime Minister Robert Menzies 1963–1966)
- Frank Jennings (Principal Private Secretary to Prime Minister Harold Holt 1966–1967)
- Ian Grigg (Principal Private Secretary to Prime Minister William McMahon 1971–1972)
- Peter Wilenski (Principal Private Secretary to Prime Minister Gough Whitlam 1972)
- Dale Budd (Principal Private Secretary to Prime Minister Malcolm Fraser 1975–1978)
- Graham Evans (Principal Private Secretary to Prime Minister Bob Hawke 1983–1986)
- Chris Connybeare (Principal Private Secretary to Prime Minister Bob Hawke 1986–1988)
- Sandy Hollway (Principal Private Secretary to Prime Minister Bob Hawke 1988–1990)
- Dennis Richardson (Principal Private Secretary to Prime Minister Bob Hawke 1990–1991)
- Sally Cray (Principal Private Secretary to Prime Minister Malcolm Turnbull 2015–2017)
- Yaron Finkelstein (Principal Private Secretary to Prime Minister Scott Morrison 2018–2022)
- Unknown/Vacant (2022–2024)
- David Epstein (Principal Private Secretary to Prime Minister Anthony Albanese 2024–present)

== In popular culture ==
The Prime Minister's Office was satirised in the television comedy series The Hollowmen, which centred on the fictitious Central Policy Unit inspired by the Cabinet Policy Unit established by Prime Minister John Howard.

== See also ==
- Prime Minister of Australia
- Cabinet of Australia
- Department of the Prime Minister and Cabinet
