= Department of Communications (2013–2015) =

Australian government department, 2013–2015

Department overview
- Formed: 18 September 2013
- Preceding Department: Department of Broadband, Communications and the Digital Economy
- Dissolved: 21 September 2015
- Superseding Department: Department of Communications and the Arts
- Jurisdiction: Commonwealth of Australia
- Headquarters: Canberra
- Employees: 495 (30 June 2014)
- Annual budget: A$113.190 million (2012/2013)
- Ministers responsible: Malcolm Turnbull, Minister for Communications; Paul Fletcher, Parliamentary Secretary to the Minister for Communications
- Department executive: Drew Clarke, Secretary
- Website: www.communications.gov.au

The Australian Government Department of Communications was a department responsible for the broadband, broadcasting and communications sector in Australia and promoting the digital economy.

The head of the department was the Secretary of the Department of Communications, Drew Clarke, who reported to Malcolm Turnbull, then the Minister for Communications.

== History ==
The Department of Communications replaced the Department of Broadband, Communications and the Digital Economy (DBCDE) in September 2013 after the Liberal-National Coalition won the 2013 election.

In September 2015, the department was dissolved and replaced by the Department of Communications and the Arts.

=== Preceding departments ===
- Postmaster-General's Department (1 January 1901 – 22 December 1975)
- Department of the Media (19 December 1972 – 22 December 1975)
- Postal and Telecommunications Department (22 December 1975 – 3 November 1980)
- Department of Communications (3 November 1980 – 24 July 1987)
- Department of Transport and Communications (24 July 1987 – 23 December 1993)
- Department of Communications (23 December 1993 – 30 January 1994)
- Department of Communications and the Arts (30 January 1994 – 21 October 1998)
- Department of Communications, Information Technology and the Arts (21 October 1998 – 3 December 2007)
- Department of Broadband, Communications and the Digital Economy (3 December 2007 – 18 September 2013)

== Operational functions ==
The Administrative Arrangements Order made on 18 September 2013 detailed the following responsibilities to the department:

- Broadband policy and programs
- Postal and telecommunications policies and programs
- Spectrum policy management
- Broadcasting policy
- National policy issues relating to the digital economy
- Content policy relating to the information economy
