= Ministerial advisers (Australia) =

Political staffing

Ministerial advisers in Australia are political staffers appointed to provide support and advice to government ministers.

They play an important role in the Australian political system, serving as a link between the political executive and the bureaucracy. The Sydney Morning Herald has described them as "a curious, high-octane beast – little-known outside the corridors of power yet enormously influential within them".

These advisers are often political appointees, often selected for their loyalty, for factional reasons, expertise, or for their alignment with the minister's political party. In this, ministerial advisers are functionally distinct in the Australian system to regular public servants within the Australian Public Service. They are also distinct from parliamentary staff, such as electorate officers and parliamentary political advisers; that are provided by parliament.

The role ministerial advisers play in the Australian system has grown remarkably in recent decades. They have become an "integral part of the political landscape". The number of Commonwealth ministerial staff has increased in headcount from ~160 in the 1970s to ~420 in the 2010s.

According to scholar Yee-Fui Ng, the role of the ministerial adviser originated in the practice of ministers having informal discussions with their confidants to discuss political strategy. This role has since been formalised and institutionalised in the Australian system, "into the role of the partisan ministerial adviser as distinct from the impartial public service".

Ministerial advisers are extremely influential in Australian politics, especially those working within the Prime Minister's Office (or Premier's office). Former deputy premier of Victoria John Thwaites has said that such advisers are "often ... as powerful, or more powerful, than some ministers" and have "more influence on the decision-making in most cases than certainly junior ministers, and more than most ministers".

== Role and functions ==
Ministerial advisers typically work within the minister's office, which at a Commonwealth level is part of the broader Department of the Prime Minister and Cabinet, and at a State level a part of the Department of Premier and Cabinet.

Unlike regular public servants, ministerial advisers are not required to be appointed on merit, and need not be impartial when providing advice or implementing government policy.

Tony Nutt AO, an adviser under the Howard and Baillieu governments once stated that:

a ministerial adviser deals with the press; a ministerial adviser handles the politics. A ministerial adviser talks to the union. All of that happens every day of the week, everywhere in Australia all the time... including, frankly, the odd bit of, you know, ancient Spanish practices and a bit of bastardry on the way through. That’s all the nature of politics.

Ministerial advisers support the work of ministers in several key areas, including policy development, political strategy, stakeholder engagement, and communication.Their responsibilities may include:

1. Providing strategic advice on political and electoral issues
2. Coordinating and managing the minister's public appearances and media relations
3. Liaising with stakeholders, including interest groups, industry, and constituents
4. Developing and analysing policy options and proposals
5. Advising on legislative and regulatory issues

There are two levels of advisers employed at the Commonwealth level, non-senior and senior. Non-senior roles include the "assistant adviser, the "adviser", and the "media adviser". Salary ranges for this role are between ~$80,000 - $140,000.

Senior roles include the principal adviser, the chief of staff, the senior adviser, and the senior media adviser. Only government ministers are able to employ principal advisers. Salary ranges for these roles range between ~$133,000 - $270,000. In addition to salary, significant perks and allowances, such as private care allowances, are also provided for the most senior roles.

== Accountability issues ==
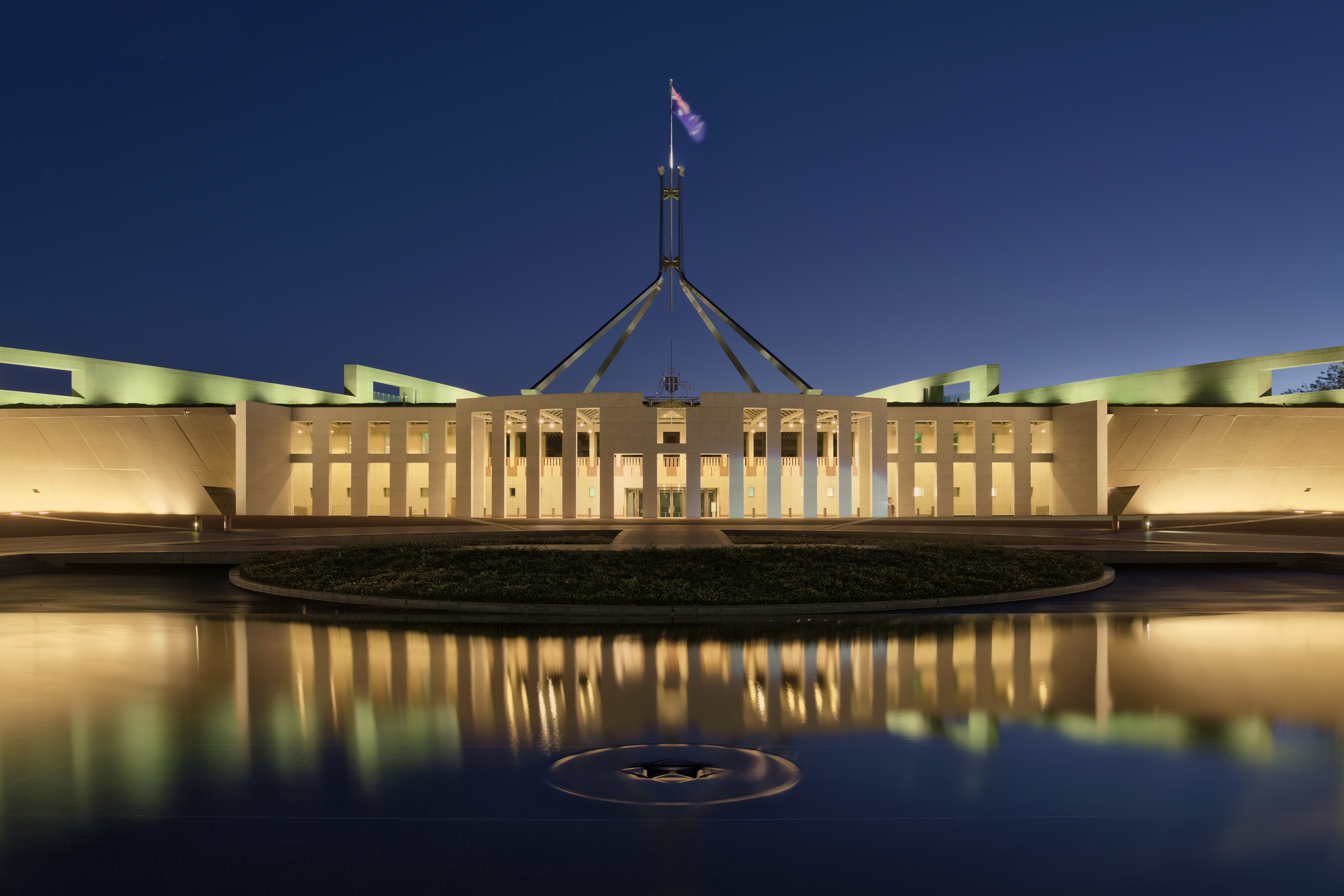
Parliament House, Canberra.

The role of ministerial adviser has been criticised by commentators, particularly on accountability and transparency grounds. Importantly, as political appointees, their roles are not subject to the same scrutiny as public servants, and so they are relatively shielded from parliamentary and public oversight.

Some critics argue that this lack of transparency has led to an erosion of democratic principles and contributes to a "culture of secrecy" within government.

On multiple occasions ministerial advisers have been banned by their ministers from appearing before parliamentary committees, on the claimed ground that there is a constitutional convention that they do not appear. This occurred, for example, during the Children Overboard affair during the Howard government.

Interviews with Commonwealth ministers have shown that since the claims made at the time of the children overboard scandal, most do not believe such a constitutional convention to actually exist. Most believed "children overboard" did not result in a binding precedent, and that they would not support claims of such a convention in future.

Nevertheless, there is a cultural hesitance among parliamentarians to call political staff before committees. Between the major parties, a détente exists on this issue. Former ministers Kim Carr and Peter Costello have both objected to it occurring, on the basis that it would allow a minister to evade their own accountability to parliament by allowing the adviser to take the blame.

== Notable ministerial advisers ==
Some advisers notable by virtue of their current roles include: (Note: As of April 2023)

Role	Serving under	Incumbent
Prime Minister Chief of Staff	Anthony Albanese	Tim Gartrell
Victorian Premier Chief of Staff	Daniel Andrews	Lissie Ratcliff
NSW Premier Chief of Staff	Chris Minns	James Cullen
WA Premier Chief of Staff	Roger Cook	Daniel Pastorelli
QLD Premier Chief of Staff	Annastacia Palaszczuk	Jim Murphy
SA Premier Chief of Staff	Peter Malinauskas	John Bistrovic

Some Australian ministerial advisers have become notable political figures in their own right. Sometimes this is because ministerial staffing is a useful pathway to elected political office.

Notable former ministerial advisers include:

- Peta Credlin
- Madeleine King
- Jim Chalmers
- Andrew Charlton
- Tony Abbott (Note: Abbott was former media adviser to John Hewson as opposition leader)
- Nicholas Reece

== See also ==
- Special adviser (UK)
- White House Chief of Staff
- Spoils system
