= Department of Communications and the Arts =

Australian government department

Department overview
- Formed: 21 September 2015
- Preceding Department: Department of Communications
- Dissolved: 31 January 2020
- Superseding Department: Department of Infrastructure, Transport, Regional Development and Communications
- Jurisdiction: Commonwealth of Australia
- Headquarters: Canberra
- Minister responsible: Paul Fletcher, Minister for Communications Minister for the Arts
- Department executive: Mike Mrdak, Secretary
- Child agencies: Australian Communications and Media Authority; NBN Co Limited; Australian Broadcasting Corporation; Australian Postal Corporation; Special Broadcasting Service Corporation
- Website: www.communications.gov.au

The Australian Department of Communications and the Arts was a department of the Government of Australia charged with responsibility for communications policy and programs and cultural affairs.

In December 2019, prime minister Scott Morrison announced that the department would be merged into a new "mega department", the new Department of Infrastructure, Transport, Regional Development and Communications. In response to criticism from the arts sector, Paul Fletcher, Minister for Communications and the Arts said that the merger was merely administrative and would not result in budget cuts.

== History ==
The department was created in September 2015 following Malcolm Turnbull becoming prime minister, replacing the Department of Communications, and transferring responsibility for the arts from the Attorney-General's Department.

=== Preceding departments ===
- Postmaster-General's Department (1 January 1901 – 22 December 1975)
- Department of the Media (19 December 1972 – 22 December 1975)
- Postal and Telecommunications Department (22 December 1975 – 3 November 1980)
- Department of Communications (3 November 1980 – 24 July 1987)
- Department of Transport and Communications (24 July 1987 – 23 December 1993)
- Department of Communications (23 December 1993 – 30 January 1994)
- Department of Communications and the Arts (30 January 1994 – 21 October 1998)
- Department of Communications, Information Technology and the Arts (21 October 1998 – 3 December 2007)
- Department of Broadband, Communications and the Digital Economy (3 December 2007 – 18 September 2013)
- Department of Communications (18 September 2013 – 21 September 2015)

== Operational functions ==
The Administrative Arrangements Order made on 21 September 2015 detailed the following responsibilities to the department:

- Broadband policy and programs
- Postal and telecommunications policies and programs
- Spectrum policy management
- Broadcasting policy
- National policy issues relating to the digital economy
- Content policy relating to the information economy
- Classification
- Copyright
- Cultural affairs, including movable cultural heritage and support for the arts
  - As part of this function, the department administers a programme relating to the return of Aboriginal Australian human remains and cultural objects, the International Repatriation Program (IRP). This programme "supports the repatriation of ancestral remains and secret sacred objects to their communities of origin to help promote healing and reconciliation" and assists community representatives work towards repatriation of remains in various ways. (Note: There was previously a domestic Return of Indigenous Cultural Property (RICP) program run by the former Department of Environment, Water, Heritage and the Arts (DEWHA – 207-2010), which supported the return of both human remains and secret sacred objects from institutions within Australia, but it looks as if the functionality has been incorporated in IRP.)

== Language revival project ==
As of 2020, the department is funding the Priority Languages Support Project, being undertaken by First Languages Australia. The project aims to "identify and document critically-endangered languages – those languages for which little or no documentation exists, where no recordings have previously been made, but where there are living speakers". It has so far prioritised 20 languages

== See also ==
- Minister for Communications
- List of Australian Commonwealth Government entities
