= David Epstein =

David Epstein may refer to:

- David Epstein (conductor) (1931–2002), composer, conductor and music scientist at MIT
- David B. A. Epstein (born 1937), British mathematician
- David Epstein (journalist), American science writer
- David Epstein (Australia) (born 1963), Australian public affairs specialist
- David Epstein (gangster), former member of Epstein–Wolmark divorce-gang
- David G. Epstein, professor at the University of Richmond School of Law and bankruptcy expert

== See also ==
- David Eppstein (born 1963), American mathematician and professor of computer science
