= Ministry of Transportation and Communications =

Ministry of Transportation/Transport and Communications may refer to:

Alphabetical by country

- Ministry of Transport and Communication (Armenia)
- Ministry of Transport and Communications (Belarus)
- Ministry of Transport and Communications (Botswana)
- Ministry of Transport and Communications (Bulgaria)
- Ministry of Transport and Communications (Ethiopia)
- Ministry of Transport and Communications (Finland)
- Ministry of Infrastructure and Transport (Greece), formerly the Ministry of Transportation and Communications
- Ministry of Transport and Communications (Kazakhstan)
- Ministry of Transport and Communications (Lithuania)
- Ministry of Transport and Communications (Myanmar)
- Ministry of Transport and Communications (Norway)
- Ministry of Transport and Communications (Peru)
- Ministry of Transportation and Communications (Bangsamoro), Philippines
- Ministry of Transportation and Communications (Taiwan)
- Ministry of Transport and Communications (Timor-Leste)
- Ministry of Infrastructure (Ukraine), formerly the Ministry of Transport and Communications
- Ministry of Transport and Communications (Venezuela)
- Ministry of Transport and Communications (Zambia)
