= Greg Moriarty =

Australian public servant and diplomat (born 1964)

His Excellency Greg Moriarty AO
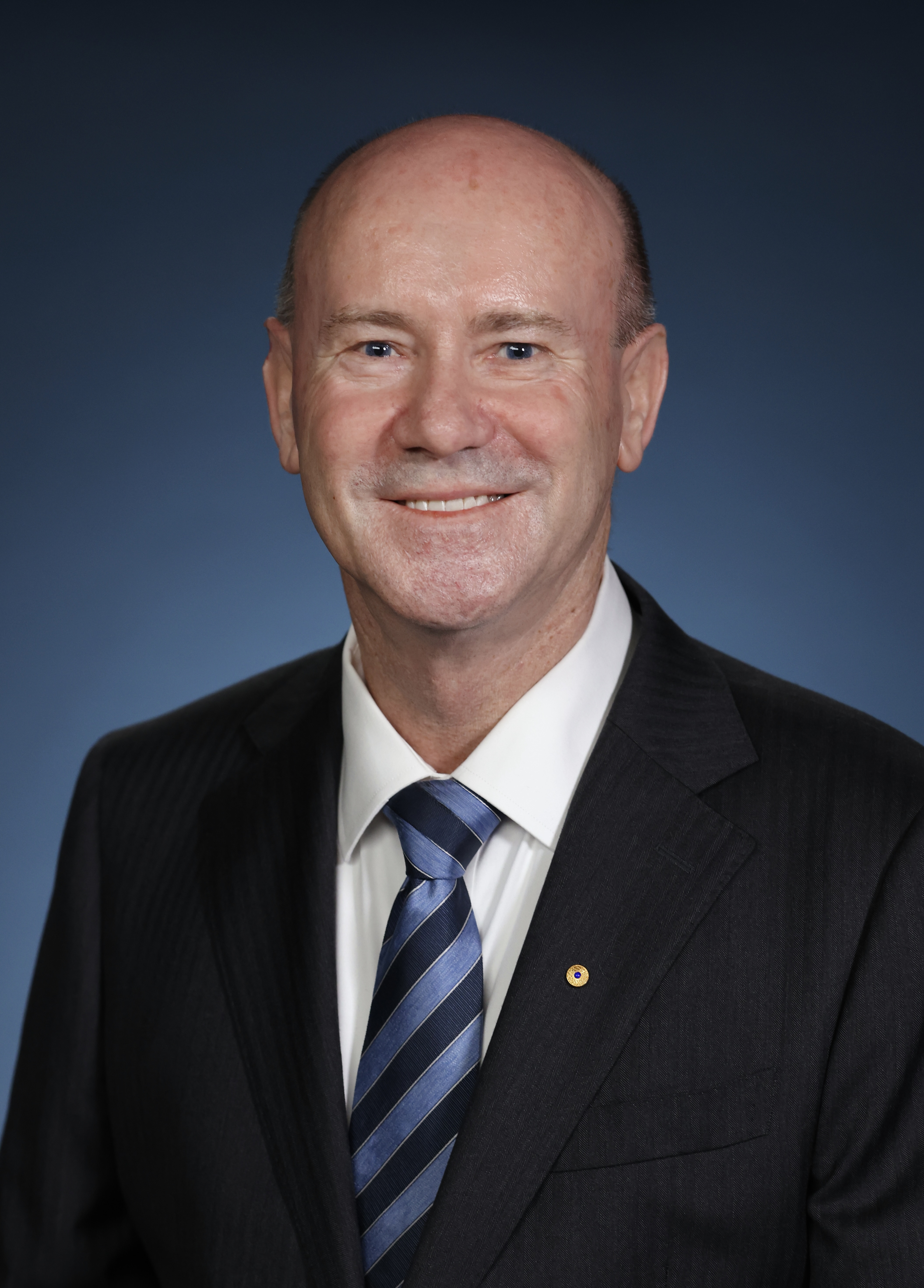
- Official portrait, 2026

Ambassador of Australia to the United States
- Incumbent
- Assumed office 21 May 2026
- Prime Minister: Anthony Albanese
- Preceded by: Kevin Rudd

Secretary of the Department of Defence
- In office 4 September 2017 – 1 April 2026
- Prime Minister: Malcolm Turnbull; Scott Morrison; Anthony Albanese
- Preceded by: Dennis Richardson
- Succeeded by: Meghan Quinn

Chief of Staff to the Prime Minister
- In office April 2017 – 4 September 2017
- Prime Minister: Malcolm Turnbull
- Preceded by: Drew Clarke
- Succeeded by: Peter Woolcott

Commonwealth Counter-Terrorism Coordinator
- In office May 2015 – April 2017
- Prime Minister: Tony Abbott; Malcolm Turnbull
- Preceded by: Position created

Ambassador of Australia to Indonesia
- In office August 2010 – December 2014
- Preceded by: Bill Farmer
- Succeeded by: Paul Grigson

Ambassador of Australia to Iran
- In office 2005–2008
- Preceded by: Jeremy Roger Newman
- Succeeded by: Marc Innes-Brown

Personal details
- Born: 4 April 1964 (age 62) Brisbane, Queensland, Australia
- Education: University of Western Australia (BA (Hons)); Australian National University (MA)
- Occupation: Public servant

Military service
- Allegiance: Australia
- Branch/service: Australian Army Reserve
- Years of service: 1983–1995
- Battles/wars: Gulf War; Operation Desert Shield; Operation Desert Storm

Gregory Laurence Moriarty (born 4 April 1964) is an Australian public servant and diplomat who has served as the ambassador of Australia to the United States since May 2026. He was the Secretary of the Department of Defence from 4 September 2017 to 1 April 2026. He also served as the Chief of Staff to prime minister Malcolm Turnbull. Moriarty has been Australian Ambassador to Iran from 2005 to 2008, Australian Ambassador to Indonesia from 2010 to 2014, the inaugural Commonwealth Counter-Terrorism Coordinator from 2015 to 2016, and the International and National Security Adviser to the Prime Minister.

== Early life and education ==
Gregory Laurence Moriarty was born in Brisbane, Queensland, on 4 April 1964. He attended Mazenod College in Perth. He has a Bachelor of Arts with Honours from the University of Western Australia and a Master of Arts in Strategic and Defence Studies from the Strategic and Defence Studies Centre at the Australian National University.

== Career ==
=== Defence ===
Moriarty joined the Department of Defence in 1986 and worked in Defence until 1995, primarily in the Defence Intelligence Organisation as a regional analyst. An officer in the Australian Army Reserve, Moriarty was attached to the Headquarters of the United States Central Command in the Persian Gulf during Operations Desert Shield and Operation Desert Storm. Moriarty returned to the Department of Defence in 2017 as the Secretary of the Department of Defence.

=== Foreign Affairs ===
Prior to taking up his first ambassadorial role as Australian Ambassador to Iran in March 2005, Moriarty worked in various positions in the Department of Foreign Affairs and Trade, including in the Papua New Guinea Section and with postings at the Australian High Commission in Port Moresby, as Assistant Secretary of the Maritime South East Asia Branch, and Deputy Leader and Senior Negotiator of the Peace Monitoring Group on Bougainville in 1998.

As Ambassador to Iran, he resided in Tehran from 2005 to 2008. While in the role, Moriarty travelled to Washington to brief then US President George W. Bush on Iranian politics, becoming one of a small number of Australian diplomats ever to have briefed an American president.

Moriarty was the Assistant Secretary for the Parliamentary and Media Branch between 2008 and 2009 and then the First Assistant Secretary for the Consular, Public Diplomacy and Parliamentary Affairs Division from 2009 to 2010 of the Department of Foreign Affairs and Trade.

His nomination by the Australian Government as Australian Ambassador to Indonesia was announced in July 2010. He arrived in Indonesia in late October, immediately prior to the Mount Merapi eruptions and the 2010 Mentawai earthquake and tsunami.

Whilst Moriarty was Ambassador to Indonesia, the Australian Government escalated its border protection policy. The Indonesian Government opposed Australia's boat turnback policy. During the appointment, Moriarty recommended that Australians take the time to learn more about Indonesia to set the two nations up for a great strategic partnership that would help Australian businesses to prosper.

From 2014 to 2015, Moriarty was a Deputy Secretary of the Department of Foreign Affairs and Trade.

On 25 January 2026, Prime Minister Anthony Albanese announced that Moriarty would be appointed the next ambassador to the United States of America.

=== Counterterrorism Coordinator ===
In May 2015, the Australian Government announced Moriarty's appointment as the inaugural Commonwealth Counter-Terrorism Coordination within the Department of the Prime Minister and Cabinet. In the role, Moriarty did not have authority to direct the operations of any particular agency, instead being granted authority "across agencies" to enhance cooperation between Australian intelligence and security agencies. His role was intended to focus primarily on preventing domestic terror threats. Soon after he began in the role, Moriarty told media that he was "stunned" by the depth and extent of the problem. After the terrorist attack in Nice, Moriarty was authorised to examine the full range of people of interest who security agencies are investigating for counter-terrorism purposes, to identify vulnerable persons with mental health concerns or patterns of criminal behavior, and examine measures needed to prevent the radicalisation of such people.

=== Prime Minister's Office ===
In September 2016, Prime Minister Malcolm Turnbull appointed Moriarty his International and National Security Adviser. He was then appointed the Prime Minister's Chief of Staff in April 2017 heading up the Prime Minister's Office.

=== Secretary of the Department of Defence ===
Greg Moriarty commenced as Secretary of the Department of Defence on 4 September 2017 and was reappointed for another 5-year term in September 2022. During his tenure, Moriarty oversaw an historic increase in the Defence budget, as well as the implementation of the National Defence Strategy in response to the Defence Strategic Review. He also led the Department working with counterparts in the United States and the United Kingdom in the development and implementation of AUKUS, a trilateral security partnership designed to "promote a free and open Indo-Pacific that is secure and stable."

Senator Jacqui Lambie slammed Moriarty on his appointment of Kathryn Campbell, a central figure in the Robodebt scandal, to the $900,000 job as a supervisor for the AUKUS nuclear submarine project. Although Moriarty claimed that at the time he appointed Campbell there was no Royal commission, it was already well known regarding her responsibilities for Robodebt and her denials including to Senate Estimates. Lambie described Campbell's appointment as a disgrace.

=== Appointment as Ambassador ===
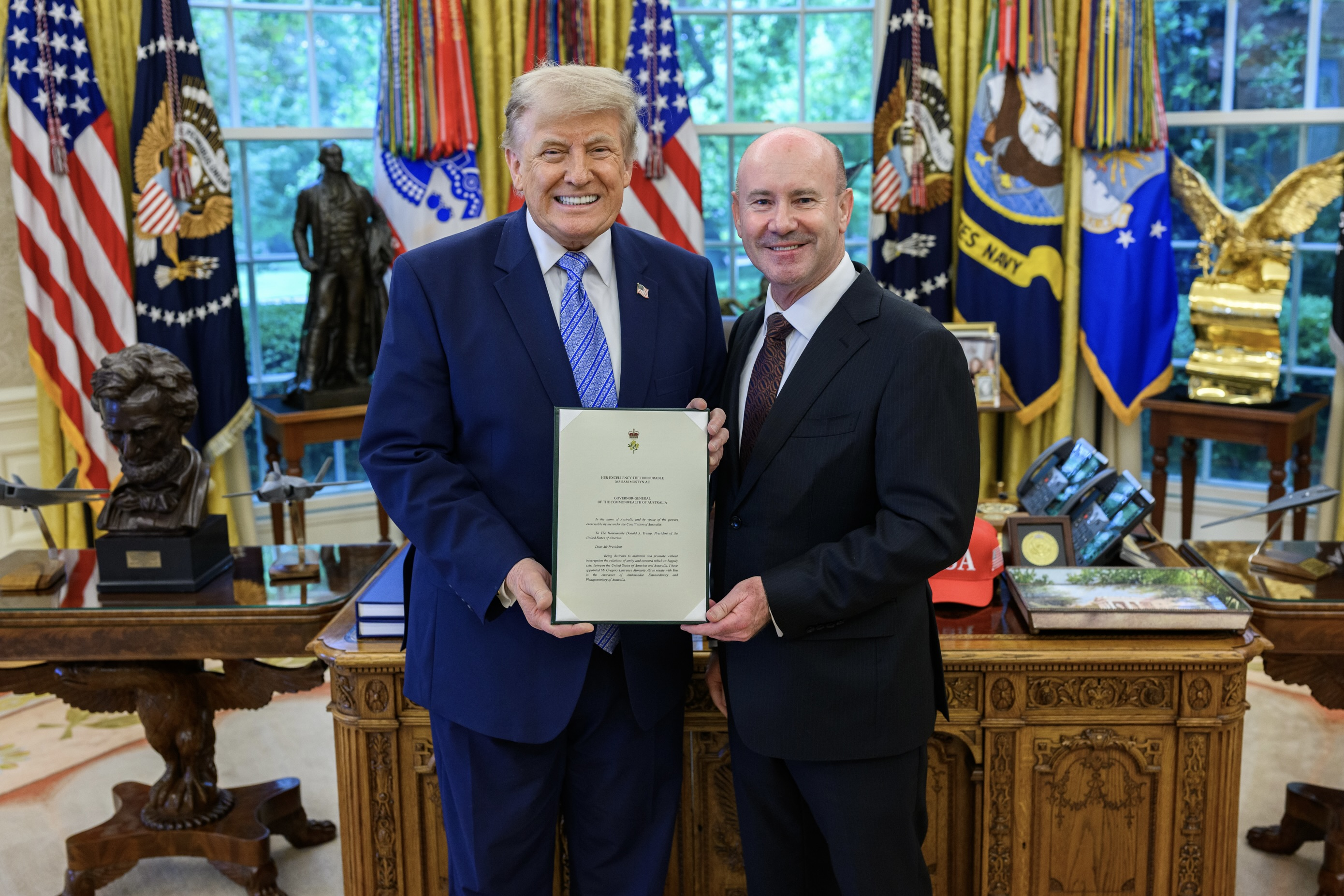
Ambassador Greg Moriarty poses with US President Donald Trump

In January 2026, Moriarty was announced as Kevin Rudd's successor for the position of Ambassador to the United States. Australian Prime Minister Anthony Albanese said Moriarty would represent Australia’s interests with the Trump administration with distinction, calling him “an outstanding Australian public servant.” Opposition Leader Sussan Ley also welcomed the appointment, calling Moriarty a "safe pair of hands to advance Australia’s interest, build this relationship and ensure AUKUS reaches its full potential.”

Moriarty presented his credentials to the President of the United States on Thursday, May 21, 2026, officially beginning his term as Ambassador, stating on X that "it’s an honour to serve Australia in Washington DC. I look forward to working with the Administration to strengthen our relationship."

== Awards ==
Moriarty was appointed an Officer of the Order of Australia in the 2024 Australia Day Honours for "distinguished service to public administration in leadership roles, particularly in national and international security".

Government offices
Preceded by Dennis Richardson	Secretary of the Department of Defence; 2017–2026	Succeeded by Meghan Quinn
New office	Commonwealth Counter-Terrorism Coordinator; 2015–2016	Succeeded by Tony Sheehan
Diplomatic posts
Preceded by Jeremy Newman	Australian Ambassador to Iran; 2005–2008	Succeeded by Marc Innes-Brown
Preceded by Bill Farmer	Australian Ambassador to Indonesia; 2010–2014	Succeeded by Paul Grigson
Preceded by Kevin Rudd	Australian Ambassador to the United States; 2026–present	Incumbent
