= Neville Stevens =

Australian public servant

Neville Stevens AO

Secretary of the Department of Industry, Technology and Commerce
- In office 22 December 1990 – 24 March 1993

Secretary of the Department of Communications
- In office 24 March 1993 – 19 December 1993

Secretary of the Department of Communications
- In office 23 December 1993 – 30 January 1994

Secretary of the Department of Communications and the Arts
- In office 30 January 1994 – 21 October 1998

Secretary of the Department of Communications, Information Technology and the Arts
- In office 21 October 1998 – 26 April 2001

Personal details
- Born: Neville Robert Stevens
- Education: University of Adelaide
- Occupation: Public servant

Neville Robert Stevens AO is a former senior Australian public servant and policymaker. He currently works as a consultant and serves on a number of boards.

== Life and career ==
Stevens was appointed to his first Secretary role in December 1990, as head of the Department of Industry, Technology and Commerce, having been a Deputy Secretary in the department for over five years. He continued in the top job when the department was abolished and replaced with the Department of Industry, Technology and Regional Development in March 1993.

He was moved to the Department of Communications when it was established in December 1993. He stayed at the Communications Department in the Secretary role as its functions expanded, first becoming the Department of Communications and the Arts in 1994, and later the Department of Communications, Information Technology and the Arts in 1998.

During his time as departmental Secretary of the Communication Department, Stevens was closely involved in telecommunications reform, broadcasting policy and IT industry development. He oversaw government IT policy during a period of tremendous change. He also served on the Council of the National Library of Australia.

Neville Stevens retired from the Australian Public Service in 2001. In 2003, he was appointed Chair of the Australian Centre for Advanced Computing and Communications Board.

Stevens was appointed Chair of the Cooperative Research Centres Committee in July 2010.

== Awards ==
Stevens was awarded the Centenary Medal in 2001 for service to the Centenary of Federation celebrations. He was made an Officer of the Order of Australia in January 2003 for service in the field of public sector administration, particularly oversighting the implementation of reforms in the information technology and telecommunications industries, and to the community through executive membership of a range of cultural and artistic organisations.

Government offices
Preceded by Malcolm McIntosh	Secretary of the Department of Industry, Technology and Commerce; 1991 – 1993	Succeeded by Himself as Secretary of the Department of Industry, Technology and Regional Development
Preceded by Himself as Secretary of the Department of Industry, Technology and Commerce	Secretary of the Department of Industry, Technology and Regional Development; 1993	Succeeded by Sandy Hollway
Preceded by Graham Evans as Secretary of the Department of Transport and Communications	Secretary of the Department of Communications; 1993 – 1994	Succeeded by Himself as Secretary of the Department of Communications and the Arts
Preceded by Himself as Secretary of the Department of Communications	Secretary of the Department of Communications and the Arts; 1994 – 1998	Succeeded by Himself as Secretary of the Department of Communications, Information Technology and the Arts
Preceded by Himself as Secretary of the Department of Communications and the Arts	Secretary of the Department of Communications, Information Technology and the Arts; 1998 – 2001	Succeeded by Ian Watt
