= Drew Clarke =

Australian public servant

Drew Clarke AO PSM FTSE

Chief of Staff of the Prime Minister's Office
- In office 15 September 2015 – 21 April 2017

Secretary of the Department of Communications
- In office 18 September 2013 – 21 September 2015

Secretary of the Department of Broadband, Communications and the Digital Economy
- In office 11 March 2013 – 18 September 2013

Secretary of the Department of Resources, Energy and Tourism
- In office April 2010 – March 2013

Personal details
- Born: Andrew Leigh Clarke
- Education: RMIT University, Ohio State University
- Occupation: Public servant

Andrew Leigh Clarke AO FTSE FRGS (born 1954) is a former senior Australian public servant who served as Secretary of several departments, and as Chief of Staff to Prime Minister Malcolm Turnbull, before his retirement in April 2017. He subsequently served on the Boards of CSIRO and NBN Co, and as Chair of the Australian Energy Market Operator (AEMO) Board until 2024. Clarke is currently engaged in Antarctic science governance.

== Career ==
Clarke has a Bachelor of Applied Science (Surveying) from RMIT University (1974), a Master of Science from The Ohio State University (1982), and a Diploma from the Australian Institute of Company Directors (2002).

His early career was as a surveyor in the Australian Government’s Division of National Mapping (Natmap – now part of Geoscience Australia). Clarke initially led topographic surveys in Australia and Antarctica, then led development of Natmap’s digital mapping system and Geodata products. He was involved in several Australian, Antarctic and international mapping bodies, chairing ANZLIC (Australian Spatial Information Council) and the SCAR (Scientific Committee on Antarctic Research) Working Group on Geodesy and Geographic Information.

From 1995 to 2003, Clarke held senior executive roles in departments including Industry, Science and Resources (DISR), leading applied science agencies and AusIndustry. From 2003 to 2008, he was head of the Energy and Environment Division, responsible for clean energy programs and National Energy Market policy.

In 2008 Clarke was appointed deputy secretary of the Department of Resources, Energy and Tourism (RET), then promoted to secretary of the department in April 2010. He was the principal adviser for the Clean Energy Initiative established by the Rudd Government and chaired the committee of Commonwealth, state and territory officials advising the COAG Ministerial Council on Energy.

Clarke was appointed by the Gillard Government to head the Department of Broadband, Communications and the Digital Economy in February 2013. Following the elevation of Communications Minister Malcolm Turnbull to the Prime Ministership in the September 2015 Liberal leadership spill, Clarke became Turnbull's Chief of Staff. Although originally agreeing only to establish the new prime minister's office, Clarke stayed on until after the 2016 federal election and resigned in April 2017.

Clarke’s non-executive career followed his public policy work in the energy, science, communications and Antarctic sectors.

He was appointed to the board of the national broadband company NBN Co in August 2017 for a three-year term, then reappointed in August 2020 for a second three-year term. He was appointed to the board of the national science agency CSIRO in August 2017 for a five-year term.

In October 2017 the Australian Energy Market Operator AEMO announced that Clarke had been appointed chair. He was reappointed in 2021, and retired in April 2024 after six years in the role. In 2019-2022, Clarke chaired the Australian Council of Learned Academies (ACOLA) ‘Australian Energy Transition Research Plan’ program.

Clarke was appointed chair of the Governance Advisory Board of Monash University’s Securing Antarctica’s Environmental Future (SAEF) research program in 2021 and is an ex officio member of the Australian Government’s Antarctic Science Council.

== Awards ==
Clarke was awarded a Public Service Medal on the Queen's Birthday 2009 "for outstanding public service in driving significant reform of the energy market".

He was elected a Fellow of the Australian Academy of Technological Sciences and Engineering in 2011. He was appointed a Fellow of the Royal Geographical Society in 2022.

Clarke was appointed an Officer of the Order of Australia (AO) on Australia Day 2016 "for distinguished service to public administration, to communications and energy policy initiatives and reform, and to the spatial information industry".

The Australian National University conferred Clarke the degree of Doctor of Laws honoris causa in February 2025, in recognition of his “exceptional contributions to evidence-based public policy and administration on energy markets and towards energy transition”.

Government offices
Preceded by John Pierce	Secretary of the Department of Resources, Energy and Tourism; 2010–2013	Succeeded by Blair Comley
Preceded by Peter Harris	Secretary of the Department of Broadband, Communications and the Digital Economy; 2013	Succeeded by Himself as Secretary of the Department of Communications
Preceded by Himself as Secretary of the Department of Broadband, Communications and the Digital Economy	Secretary of the Department of Communications; 2013–2015	Succeeded by Heather Smith as Secretary of the Department of Communications and the Arts
