= Chief of Staff to the Prime Minister (Australia) =

Australian government position

Chief of Staff to the Prime Minister of Australia
- Incumbent; Tim Gartrell since 23 May 2022
- Prime Minister's Office
- Seat: Australian Parliament House
- Appointer: Prime Minister of Australia
- Precursor: Principal Private Secretary
- Formation: 1972
- First holder: Peter Wilenski

The chief of staff to the prime minister of Australia is the principal adviser and head of the Prime Minister's Office. The position of chief of staff to the prime minister of Australia was formally created by Prime Minister Gough Whitlam in 1972 to run the political and private office of the prime minister.

== Powers and responsibilities ==
The chief of staff is directly responsible to the prime minister for the management of the Prime Minister's Office and for the coordination of strategic and policy priorities.

== List of Chiefs of Staff ==
Name	Term of office		Prime Minister
Peter Wilenski	1972	1975	Whitlam
Tony Eggleton	1975	1981	Fraser
David Kemp	1981	1981	Fraser
Sandy Hollway	1988	1990	Hawke
Dennis Richardson	1990	1991	Hawke
Don Russell	1991	1993	Keating
Allan Hawke	1993	1996	Keating
Nicole Feely	1996	1997	Howard
Grahame Morris	1997	1997	Howard
Arthur Sinodinos	1997	2007	Howard
David Epstein	2007	2008	Rudd
Alister Jordan	2008	2010	Rudd
Amanda Lampe	2010	2011	Gillard
Ben Hubbard	2011	2013	Gillard
Peta Credlin	2013	2015	Abbott
Drew Clarke	2015	2017	Turnbull
Greg Moriarty	2017	2017	Turnbull
Peter Woolcott	2017	2018	Turnbull
John Kunkel	2018	2022	Morrison
Tim Gartrell	2022	Incumbent	Albanese

== See also ==
- Prime Minister of Australia
- Prime Minister's Office
- Downing Street Chief of Staff
- White House Chief of Staff
- Chief of Staff to the Prime Minister (Canada)
