= Geoff Walsh =

Australian political and business adviser

Geoffrey David Walsh AO is an Australian political and business adviser.

Educated at Caulfield Grammar School and La Trobe University, Walsh worked as a journalist for the Border Mail, Herald Sun, The Age and Australian Financial Review before serving as an advisor to Australian Labor Party politicians Bob Hawke and Paul Keating during their terms as Prime Minister of Australia. He became a diplomat, working for the International Labour Organization in the United Nations Office at Geneva and later as the Australia Consul-General to Hong Kong. He worked as the National Secretary of the Australian Labor Party from 2000 to 2003 overseeing the 2001 federal election campaign. He then spent over two years as a government relations consultant.

In 2005, he was made an Officer of the Order of Australia, "for service to politics as National Secretary of the Australian Labor Party and to the community in the areas of tertiary education and promoting closer ties between Australia and Hong Kong".

Walsh was appointed Chief of Staff to Premier of Victoria Steve Bracks in September 2006. In 2007 BHP Billiton appointed Walsh as Director of Public Affairs he later became special advisor to Marius Kloppers, the former CEO of BHP.

He currently serves as the founding Executive Chairman of the Melbourne based York Park Group.

Party political offices
Preceded by Gary Gray	National Secretary of the Australian Labor Party; 2000–2003	Succeeded by Tim Gartrell
