= Peter Harris (public servant) =

Australian public servant

Peter Harris AO
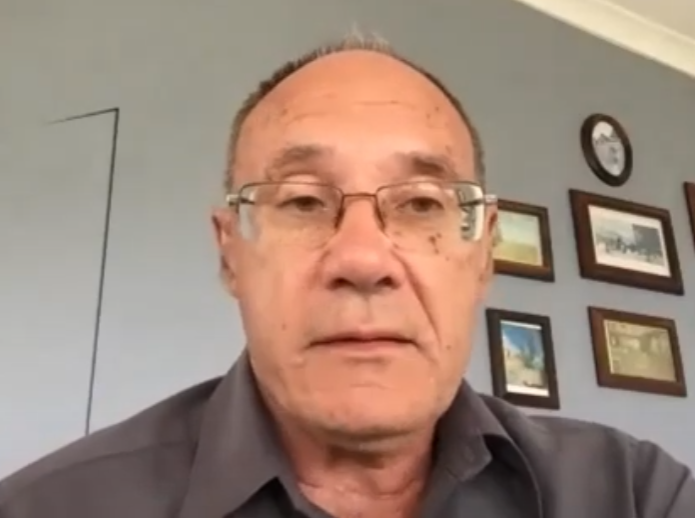
- In an online discussion in 2021

Secretary of the Department of Broadband, Communications and the Digital Economy
- In office 2009–2012

Personal details
- Born: Peter Noel Harris
- Education: University of Queensland (BEc)
- Occupation: Public servant

Peter Noel Harris AO is a senior Australian public servant. He was Secretary of the Department of Broadband, Communications and the Digital Economy from 2009 to 2012. He was Chairman of the Australian Productivity Commission between 2012 and 2018.

== Life and career ==
Harris joined the Australian Public Service in 1976 as a graduate economist in the Department of Overseas Trade. From 1989 to 1991, Harris was senior private secretary to Prime Minister Bob Hawke.

Between 2001 and 2002, Harris was vice president of government and international affairs with the Air New Zealand/Ansett Group. Ansett Australia went into liquidation in March 2002 and Harris joined the Victorian public service that year, serving as the director of public transport and later secretary of the Department of Sustainability and Environment.

Then Prime Minister Kevin Rudd appointed Harris Secretary of the Department of Broadband, Communications and the Digital Economy in August 2009. In the role, he was responsible for overseeing the roll-out of the $37 billion National Broadband Network.

In November 2012, Harris was appointed Chairman of the Australian Productivity Commission.

== Honours and appointments ==
Harris was made an Officer of the Order of Australia in 2013 for distinguished service to public administration through leadership and policy reform roles in the areas of telecommunications, the environment, primary industry and transport. In March 2019, Harris joined the board of Infrastructure Australia, about six months after retiring from his final major government role as chair of the Productivity Commission. In April 2020 he was appointed the chief executive officer of the National COVID-19 Coordination Commission (NCC) advisory board, which he concluded in October 2020. He currently holds an advisory board position with retirement specialist start up Household Capital.

He received an honorary doctorate in economics from Queensland University in 2024

Government offices
Preceded by Patricia Scott	Secretary of the Department of Broadband, Communications and the Digital Economy; 2009–2012	Succeeded by Drew Clarke
