= Minister of Transport and Communications (Timor-Leste) =

East Timorese government minister

- Ministro dos Transportes e Comunicações (Portuguese); Ministru Transportes no Komunikasoins (Tetum)
- Coat of Arms of Timor-Leste

- Flag of Timor-Leste

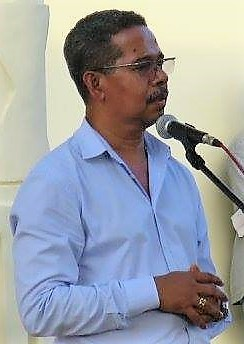
- Incumbent; Miguel Marques Gonçalves Manetelu since 1 July 2023
- Ministry of Transport and Communications
- Style: Minister; (informal); His Excellency; (formal, diplomatic)
- Member of: Constitutional Government
- Reports to: Prime Minister
- Appointer: President of Timor-Leste (following proposal by the Prime Minister of Timor-Leste)
- Inaugural holder: Eduardo Carlos dos Anjos "Kaku'uk"; (1975); João Viegas Carrascalão; (2000)
- Formation: 1975 / 2000
- Website: Ministry of Transport and Communications

The Minister of Transport and Communications (Portuguese: Ministro dos Transportes e Comunicações, Tetum: Ministru Transportes no Komunikasoins) is a senior member of the Constitutional Government of Timor-Leste heading the Ministry of Transport and Communications.

== Functions ==
Under the Constitution of Timor-Leste, the Minister has the power and the duty:

1. to implement the policy defined for the Ministry of Transport and Communications;
2. to ensure relations between the Government and the other organs of the State in the area of responsibility of the Ministry.

Where the Minister is in charge of the subject matter of a government statute, the Minister is also required, together with the Prime Minister, to sign the statute.

== Incumbent ==
The incumbent Minister of Transport and Communications is Miguel Marques Gonçalves Manetelu.

== List of ministers ==
The following individuals have been appointed as the minister:

No.	Party	Minister	Portrait	Title	Government (Prime Minister)	Term start	Term end	Term in office
1	Fretilin	Eduardo Carlos dos Anjos "Kaku'uk"		Minister of Public Works, Transport and Communications	1975 CoM (Lobato)	1 December 1975	17 December 1975	16 days
2	UDT	João Viegas Carrascalão		Minister for Infrastructure	I UNTAET (Vieira de Mello)	15 July 2000	16 July 2001	1 year, 1 day
3	Fretilin	Ovídio de Jesus Amaral		Minister for Infrastructure	I UNTAET (Vieira de Mello)	16 July 2001	20 September 2001	4 years, 344 days
3	Fretilin	Ovídio de Jesus Amaral		Minister of Transport and Communications	II UNTAET (Alkatiri)	20 September 2001	20 May 2002	4 years, 344 days
3	Fretilin	Ovídio de Jesus Amaral		Minister of Transport, Communications and Public Works	I Constitutional (Alkatiri)	20 May 2002	26 July 2005	4 years, 344 days
3	Fretilin	Ovídio de Jesus Amaral		Minister of Transport and Communications	I Constitutional (Alkatiri)	26 July 2005	25 June 2006	4 years, 344 days
4	Fretilin	Inácio Moreira		Minister of Transport and Communications	I Constitutional (Alkatiri)	25 June 2006	10 July 2006	1 year, 44 days
4	Fretilin	Inácio Moreira		Minister of Transport and Communications	II Constitutional (Ramos-Horta)	10 July 2006	19 May 2007	1 year, 44 days
4	Fretilin	Inácio Moreira		Minister of Transport and Communications	III Constitutional (da Silva)	19 May 2007	8 August 2007	1 year, 44 days
5	Independent	Pedro Lay		Minister of Infrastructure	IV Constitutional (Gusmão)	8 August 2007	8 August 2012	7 years, 192 days
5	Independent	Pedro Lay		Minister of Transport and Communications	V Constitutional (Gusmão)	8 August 2012	16 February 2015	7 years, 192 days
6	PD	Gastão Francisco de Sousa		Minister of Public Works, Transport and Communications	VI Constitutional (Araújo)	16 February 2015	15 September 2017	2 years, 211 days
6	Independent	Gastão Francisco de Sousa		Minister of Public Works, Transport and Communications	VI Constitutional (Araújo)	16 February 2015	15 September 2017	2 years, 211 days
		Vacant			VII Constitutional (Alkatiri)	3 October 2017	22 June 2018	262 days
7	KHUNTO	José Agustinho da Silva		Minister of Transport and Communications	VIII Constitutional (Ruak)	22 June 2018	1 July 2023	5 years, 9 days
11	CNRT	Miguel Marques Gonçalves Manetelu		Minister of Transport and Telecommunications	IX Constitutional (Gusmão)	1 July 2023	Incumbent	3 years, 69 days
