= Ministry of Transport and Communications (Timor-Leste) =

Ministry in the government of Timor-Leste

- Ministério dos Transportes e Comunicações (Portuguese); Ministériu Transportes no Komunikasoins (Tetum)
- Coat of Arms of Timor-Leste

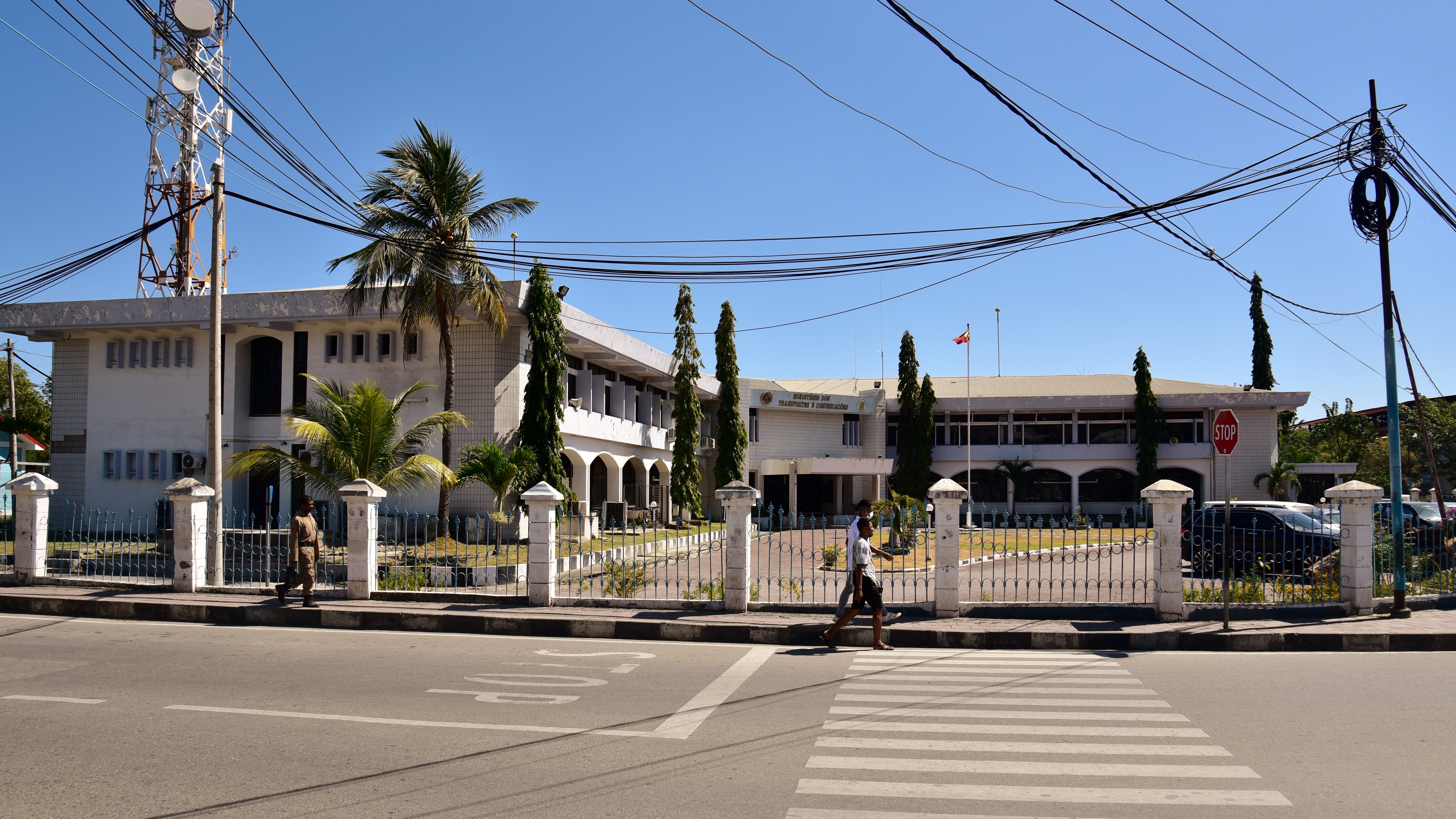
- The headquarters of the Ministry

Ministry overview
- Formed: 1975 / 2002
- Jurisdiction: Government of Timor-Leste
- Headquarters: Rua Avenida Francisco Xavier do Amaral, Caicoli, Dili; 8°33′31″S 125°34′46″E
- Minister responsible: Miguel Marques Gonçalves Manetelu, Minister of Transport and Communications
- Website: Ministry of Transport and Communications
- Agency ID: MTC

The Ministry of Transport and Communications (MTC; Portuguese: Ministério dos Transportes e Comunicações, Tetum: Ministériu Transportes no Komunikasoins) is the government department of Timor-Leste accountable for transport, communications, and related matters.

== Functions ==
The ministry is responsible for the design, implementation, coordination and evaluation of policy for the following areas:

- transport; and
- communications.

Additionally, the ministry is responsible for the proposal and implementation of its policy lines in the transport and communications sectors.

== Minister ==
The incumbent Minister of Transport and Communications is Miguel Marques Gonçalves Manetelu.

== See also ==
- List of ministries of communications
- List of ministries of transport by country
- Politics of Timor-Leste
