= Miguel Marques Gonçalves Manetelu =

East Timorese politician

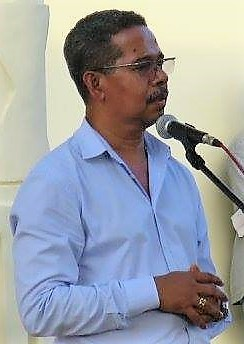
- Manetelu in 2017

Minister of Transport and Communications
- Incumbent
- Assumed office 1 July 2023
- Prime Minister: Xanana Gusmão
- Preceded by: José Agustinho da Silva

Vice Minister of Social Solidarity
- In office 16 February 2015 – 15 September 2017
- Prime Minister: Rui Maria de Araújo
- Preceded by: Jacinto Rigoberto de Deus
- Succeeded by: Office abolished

Secretary of State for Youth and Sports
- In office 8 August 2007 – 16 February 2015
- Prime Minister: Xanana Gusmão
- Preceded by: José Manuel Fernandes
- Succeeded by: Leovigildo Hornay

Personal details
- Born: Miguel Marques Gonçalves Manetelu
- Party: National Congress for Timorese Reconstruction (CNRT)

Miguel Marques Gonçalves Manetelu is an East Timorese politician, and a member of the National Congress for Timorese Reconstruction (Portuguese: Congresso Nacional de Reconstrução de Timor, CNRT).

He is the incumbent Minister of Transport and Communications, serving since July 2023 in the IX Constitutional Government of East Timor led by Prime Minister Xanana Gusmão.
