= Patricia Scott (public servant) =

Australian public servant

Secretary of the Department of Broadband, Communications and the Digital Economy
- In office December 2007 – September 2009

Secretary of the Department of Communications, Information Technology and the Arts
- In office May 2007 – December 2007

Secretary of the Department of Human Services
- In office 26 October 2004 – May 2007

Personal details
- Education: Australian National University; Macquarie University
- Occupation: Public servant

Patricia Scott is a senior Australian public servant and policymaker. In her time as Secretary of the Department of Broadband, Communications and the Digital Economy she was responsible for rolling out the first stages of the Australian Government's $40-plus billion National Broadband Network.

== Public service career ==
Scott joined the Australian Public Service in 1990.

John Howard appointed Patricia Scott as Secretary of the new Department of Human Services in 2004. She was instrumental establishing the new department.

In May 2007 Scott was appointed to lead the Department of Communications, Information Technology and the Arts. When the Rudd Government was elected in 2007, Scott continued her appointment as Secretary of the communications department, which was renamed to the Department of Broadband, Communications and the Digital Economy (DBCDE). In DBCDE she was responsible for rolling out the Government's $40-plus billion national broadband network.

After leaving her position in DBCDE in 2009, Scott moved to a role as a Commissioner of the Productivity Commission. In 2011 she headed a Productivity Commission inquiry into the feasibility of a National Disability Insurance Scheme, concluding that the Australian Government should take action to provide reasonable support services for people with a disability.

== References and further reading ==
- Malone, Paul (2006), "Chapter 5: Starting from Scratch – Patricia Scott, Department of Human Services", Australian department heads under Howard : career paths and practice (PDF), Canberra, Australia: The Australian National University, pp. 25–29, ISBN 1-920942-83-1, archived from the original (PDF) on 6 November 2013
- Scott, Patricia (2012), "Chapter 12: Our custodial role for the quality of advisory relations at the centre of government", in Wanna, John; Vincent, Sam; Podger, Andrew (eds.), With the Benefit of Hindsight: Valedictory Reflections from Departmental Secretaries 2004-11, pp. 117–123

Government offices
Preceded by Herself as Secretary of the Department of Communications, Information Technology and the Arts	Secretary of the Department of Broadband, Communications and the Digital Economy; 2007 – 2009	Succeeded by Peter Harris
Preceded by Helen Williams	Secretary of the Department of Communications, Information Technology and the Arts; 2007	Succeeded by Herself as Secretary of the Department of Broadband, Communications and the Digital Economy
New title Department established	Secretary of the Department of Human Services; 2004 - 2007	Succeeded by Helen Williams
