= David Epstein (Australia) =

Principal Private Secretary to the Australian PM

Principal Private Secretary to the Prime Minister of Australia
- Incumbent
- Assumed office March 2024
- Prime Minister: Anthony Albanese
- Preceded by: N/A

Chief of Staff to the Prime Minister
- In office 3 December 2007 – October 2008
- Prime Minister: Kevin Rudd
- Preceded by: Arthur Sinodinos
- Succeeded by: Alister Jordan

Chief of Staff to the Leader of the Opposition
- In office July 2007 – 3 December 2007
- Leader: Kevin Rudd
- Preceded by: Simon Banks
- Succeeded by: Office abolished

Personal details
- Born: David Andrew Newington Epstein; January 9, 1963 (age 63)
- Citizenship: Australia
- Party: Labor
- Education: Australian National University (BA); The Wharton School

David Andrew Newington Epstein is Principal Private Secretary to the Prime Minister of Australia. He is a public affairs specialist, and was previously a company director, corporate adviser and Chair of Communications Compliance Limited, an independent consumer compliance monitoring body for the telecommunications industry.

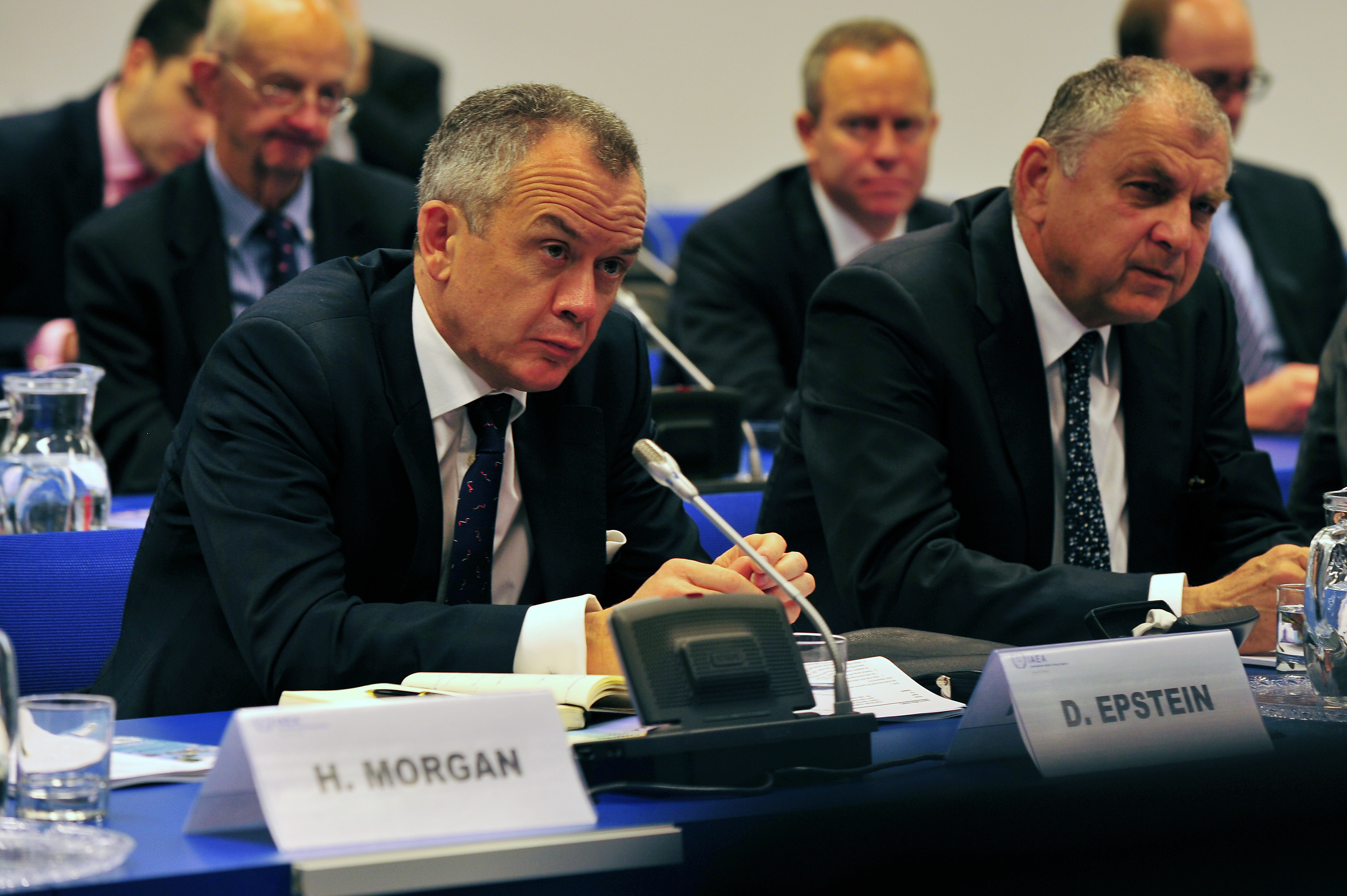
Epstein in 2013

== Biography ==
He was educated at The Geelong College, Australian National University, and The Wharton School (UPenn).

Epstein began his career as a political adviser, serving as Private Secretary to John Dawkins in the Employment, Education and Training portfolio, where he was involved in the campaign to introduce Australia's Higher Education Contribution Scheme (HECS), then serving as Director of the Ministerial Media Group and National Media Liaison Service for Australian Labor Party politicians Bob Hawke and Paul Keating during their terms as Prime Minister of Australia. He was then Chief of Staff to the Leader of the Federal Opposition Kim Beazley.

In 1999, he left politics to head both the Australian Electrical and Electronic Manufacturers' Association and Australian Telecommunications Industry Association. He was then recruited to Macquarie Corporate Telecommunications, to whom he remained an adviser after becoming a partner and Director of Government Relations Australia, a corporate advisory firm.

In June 2007, he was appointed Chief of Staff and Principal Adviser to Australian Labor Party politician Kevin Rudd, first heading the Office of the Leader of the Opposition, then the Prime Minister's Office. US State Department officials reported on his "significant" role in the Australian Labor Party campaign during the 2007 Australian Federal Election. In 2008 he was ranked second in the Australian Financial Review's Covert Power list.

Epstein resigned as Prime Minister's Chief of staff in late 2008 before accepting the position of Group Executive for Government and Corporate Affairs at Qantas Airways Limited, and served on the Qantas Executive Committee. While at Qantas he managed the company's public response to the Qantas Flight 32 engine explosion incident, later attracting recognition from the pilot of the aircraft. Reportedly, he was also involved in negotiating the release of Jetstar executives in Vietnam in the wake of Jetstar Pacific losing $US31 million on disputed fuel-hedging contracts in 2008.

Epstein was recruited to BHP Billiton in late 2010 by CEO Marius Kloppers, to a new role as company's Head of Group Public Affairs This was speculated to be part of a response to the failure of $US40 billion bid for PotashCorp following a backlash over foreign ownership from Canadian politicians.

During Epstein's tenure, BHP Billiton overtook Microsoft in size, by market capitalization, and reported a $22 billion annual profit. He left this role in September 2011, but remained a strategy and public affairs adviser to companies, serving as Vice President of Corporate and Regulatory Affairs for Singtel Optus until 2017. He is now Executive Director of The Chifley Research Centre, the official think-tank of the Australian Labor Party and a company director.

David Epstein was a non-executive director of the European Australian Business Council, Communications Compliance Limited and The Asia Society Australia Centre before returning to the Prime Minister's Office in 2024, and sat on boards of the Telecommunications Industry Ombudsman (TIO Limited) and the Committee for Sydney until 2018, and for three terms at Opera Australia until 2019.

He was also a member of the advisory board for the Headon Photofestival Foundation and was appointed an Adjunct Professor in the Deakin Business School by Deakin University in January 2019.

In July 2022, David Epstein was appointed Deputy Chair of the Open Gardens Victoria (OGV), and became Chair in 2023.

In March 2024, Epstein returned to working in politics after being appointed as the Principal Private Secretary in the Prime Minister's Office of Anthony Albanese.

== Publications ==
No Longer At The Centre: Australia's real relationship with Asia, in Disruptive Asia (Vol.1) © Asia Society Australia 2017.

Bob Hawke's Asia Legacy, in The Lowy Interpreter, Lowy Institute, 2019
