= José Agustinho da Silva =

East Timorese politician

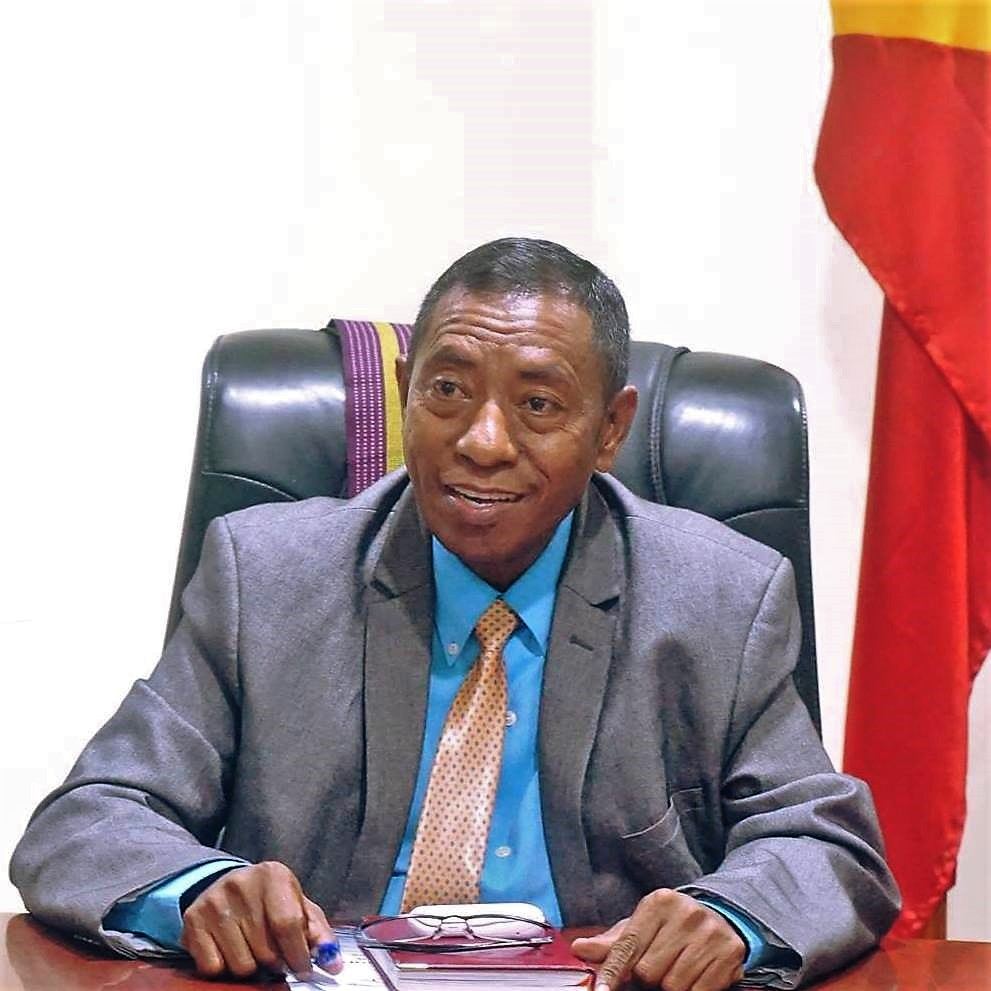
- Silva in 2018

Minister of Transport and Communications
- In office 22 June 2018 – 1 July 2023
- Prime Minister: Taur Matan Ruak
- Succeeded by: Miguel Marques Gonçalves

Member of the National Parliament
- In office 2017–2018

Personal details
- Party: KHUNTO

José Agustinho da Silva is an East Timorese politician and a member of the Kmanek Haburas Unidade Nasional Timor Oan (KHUNTO) political party.

From June 2018 to July 2023, he was Minister of Transport and Communications, serving in the VIII Constitutional Government of East Timor led by Prime Minister Taur Matan Ruak.

== Political career ==
=== 2012–2018: Candidate and parliamentarian ===
In the 2012 East Timorese parliamentary election, KHUNTO narrowly failed to overcome the 3% electoral threshold and have two members elected to the National Parliament. Silva was the #3 candidate on KHUNTO's list for that election.

Silva then came to political prominence in the mid-2010s, when he replaced António Verdial de Sousa as secretary-general of KHUNTO.

In the 2017 parliamentary election, Silva was elected to the National Parliament from #4 on the party's list. He subsequently became Chairman of the Committee for Education, Health and Social Affairs (Committee-F), and an alternate member of the Council of Administration. In September 2017, he became a substitute delegate to the National Parliamentary Group at the Parliamentary Assembly of the Community of Portuguese Language Countries (CPLP)

=== 2018–2023: Minister ===
In East Timor's early election in 2018, Silva was ranked #20 in the Alliance for Change and Progress (AMP), of which KHUNTO was a part, and was again elected to the National Parliament. On 22 June 2018, he was sworn in as Minister of Transport and Communications, and therefore automatically had to give up his parliamentary seat.

In January 2019, Silva signed a memorandum of agreement (MoU) with his Indonesian counterpart, Budi Karya Sumadi, covering transport arrangements between the two countries, with the particular aim of increasing aviation ties, but also to promote education and training in the transport sector in East Timor. On 31 October 2019, he was present at Dili Airport to greet the first Drukair Royal Bhutan Airlines flight from Singapore, under a new partnership with Air Timor following the collapse of a previous codeshare arrangement between Air Timor and Silkair of Singapore. He said [translation]:

This is a policy of and effort by the Government of Timor-Leste to [improve] connectivity in our air transport sector. Because we want ... diversification in the air transport sector.
We appreciate the effort of Air Timor for normalizing and reactivating the Singapore – Dili route. This is such a positive step.

Silva was also active in the procurement of a roll-on/roll-off passenger and cargo (RoPax) ferry to replace the ageing Berlin Nakroma. In November 2019, he signed a contract with Damen Shipyards Group for the design and construction of a new 67.3 m-long (221 ft) vessel, co-financed by East Timor and the government of Germany. In a speech delivered at the contract signing, he said:

This new ferry will help to connect Dili with other ports on the south and east coasts of Timor-Leste and improve access to market, education and institutions in Dili and provide other important services to Timor-Leste.
[It] will increase job opportunities to our seafarers and give [them] direct and long-term employment opportunities ....

In March 2020, Silva was reelected as secretary-general of KHUNTO for the period 2020 to 2024.

Notwithstanding the breakdown of the Alliance for Change and Progress (AMP) coalition during the first few months of 2020, and the consequent restructuring of the government in mid-2020, Silva remained in office as Minister of Transport and Communications.

In September 2021, Silva announced that the new Damen ferry, which had been built in China and was destined to be named Berlin-Ramelau, would arrive in East Timor by 11 October 2021. In December 2021, after the vessel had been delivered, he said:

Maritime connectivity reinforces national unity and is the main source of supply for the populations of Oecusse-Ambeno and Ataúro. The Maritime Transport Policy provides for the extension of maritime links to the east and south coast, and this is the original objective of the Berlin-Ramelau.

At the Plenipotentiary Conference of the International Telecommunication Union (ITU) held in Bucharest, Romania, in 2022, Silva made a telecommunications policy statement. In doing so, he informed the ITU that East Timor had made progress in building its telecommunications networks and services. He also observed that since 2012 the country had had a functioning market contested by three international mobile service providers, and that since 2015 its mobile network coverage had exceeded 96 percent of its population areas. He continued:

In Timor-Leste, we will continue to redouble our efforts to extend digital infrastructure; to connect those who are not yet connected, most especially the students and faculty members in our schools and universities; to raise the digital literacy of our population and to strengthen our capacity to manage and reduce cyber security risks.

Silva's tenure as Minister ended when the IX Constitutional Government took office on 1 July 2023. He was succeeded by Miguel Marques Gonçalves.
