= Arthur Sinodinos =

Australian diplomat and politician

The Honourable Arthur Sinodinos AO
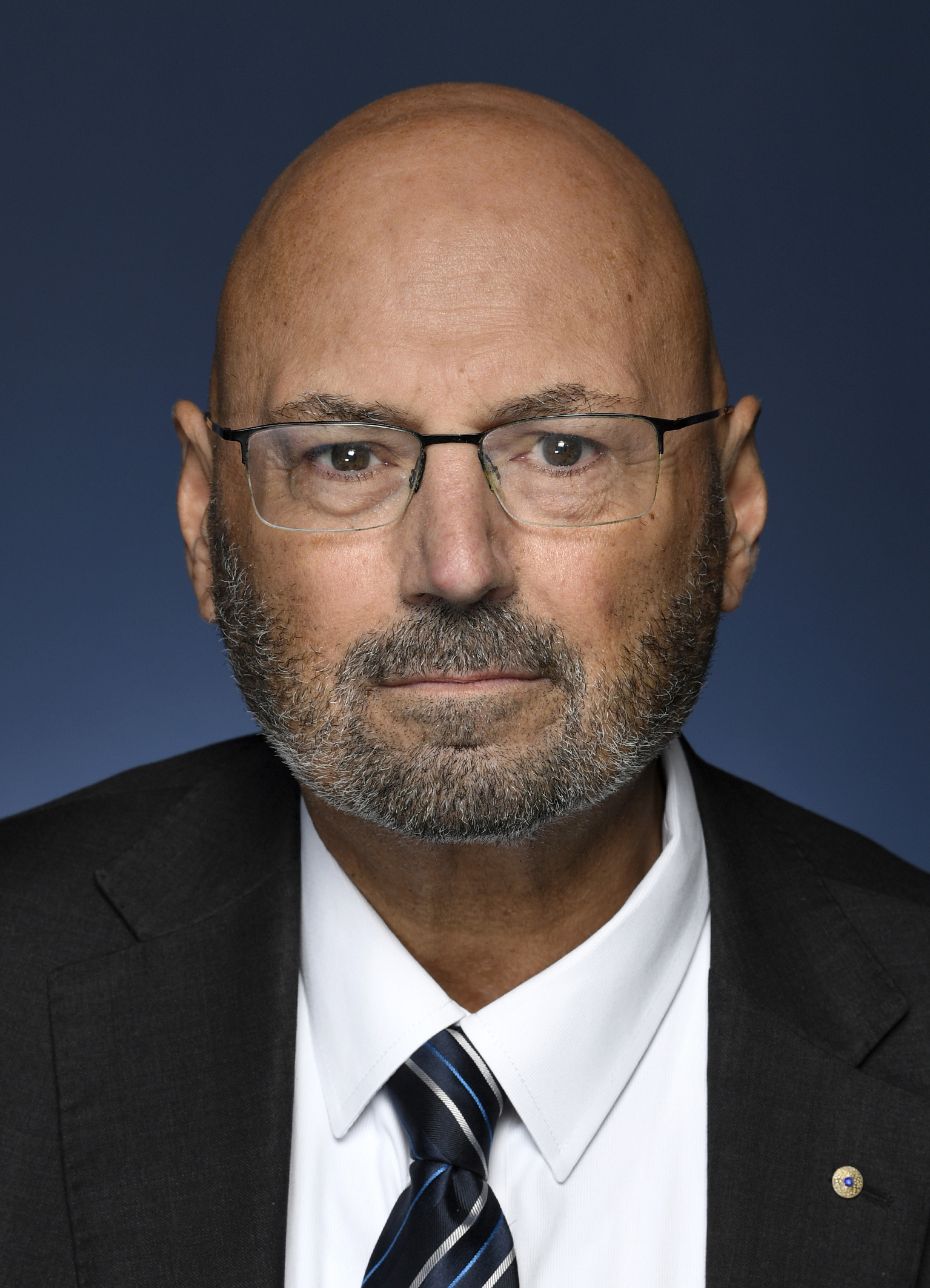
- Official portrait, 2020

22nd Ambassador of Australia to the United States
- In office 7 February 2020 – 20 March 2023
- Prime Minister: Scott Morrison; Anthony Albanese
- Preceded by: Joe Hockey
- Succeeded by: Kevin Rudd

Minister for Industry, Innovation and Science
- In office 24 January 2017 – 20 December 2017
- Prime Minister: Malcolm Turnbull
- Preceded by: Greg Hunt
- Succeeded by: Karen Andrews

Cabinet Secretary
- In office 21 September 2015 – 24 January 2017
- Prime Minister: Malcolm Turnbull
- Preceded by: Alan Griffin
- Succeeded by: Mark Dreyfus (2022)

Assistant Treasurer of Australia
- In office 18 September 2013 – 19 December 2014
- Prime Minister: Tony Abbott
- Preceded by: David Bradbury
- Succeeded by: Josh Frydenberg

Senator for New South Wales
- In office 13 October 2011 – 11 November 2019
- Preceded by: Helen Coonan
- Succeeded by: Jim Molan

Chief of Staff to the Prime Minister
- In office 1 September 1997 – 3 December 2007
- Prime Minister: John Howard
- Preceded by: Grahame Morris
- Succeeded by: David Epstein

Personal details
- Born: 25 February 1957 (age 69) Newcastle, New South Wales, Australia
- Party: Liberal
- Education: University of Newcastle
- Profession: Economist, investment banker and politician

Arthur Sinodinos AO (/ˌsɪnəˈdiːnəs/ SIN-ə-DEE-nəs; Greek: Άρθουρ Σινοδινός, romanized: Árthour Sinodinós; born 25 February 1957) is an Australian diplomat and former Liberal Party politician, who was the Ambassador to the United States between February 2020 and March 2023. He served as Chief of Staff to Prime Minister John Howard from 1997 to 2007 and was a Senator for New South Wales from 2011 to 2019, becoming a minister in the Abbott and Turnbull governments.

Sinodinos was born in Newcastle, New South Wales, and attended the University of Newcastle. For many years, he was a public servant until becoming a political adviser. In 1997 he was appointed Chief of Staff to John Howard. After Howard's defeat at the 2007 election, Sinodinos spent time working for both Goldman Sachs and the National Australia Bank, before being appointed to fill a vacant seat in the Senate in 2011. After the Liberal victory at the 2013 election, newly-elected Prime Minister Tony Abbott appointed Sinodinos Assistant Treasurer. Sinodinos later stepped aside from his ministerial duties in 2014 during an investigation by the New South Wales Independent Commission Against Corruption (ICAC). In September 2015, after Malcolm Turnbull's appointment as Prime Minister, Sinodinos was appointed Cabinet Secretary. He was later made Minister for Industry, Innovation and Science in January 2017. He resigned from the Government in December 2017, due to receiving treatment for cancer. In May 2019, Prime Minister Scott Morrison announced that Sinodinos would become Ambassador to the United States.

== Background and early career ==
Sinodinos was born in Newcastle, New South Wales, to Greek immigrant parents. His father was a member of the left-aligned Seaman's Union that, during Sinodinos' early years, was campaigning against the United States intervention in Vietnam. His mother recalled stories of the Greek Civil War of the 1940s where Communist insurgents would knock on the door of their family home at night. Sinodinos has said that this helped him form his early political views.

Sinodinos graduated from the University of Newcastle in 1979 with a Bachelor of Commerce with Honours. He then entered the Australian Public Service as a graduate recruit, working within the Department of Finance, before working in the Department of the Treasury between 1980 and 1987 and again between 1989 and 1995.

He was the Chief of Staff to then Prime Minister John Howard from 1997 to 2006, after serving with him previously from 1987 to 1989 when he was Opposition Leader and rejoining him in 1995. As a close confidant of the Prime Minister, he was regarded as one of the most powerful people in the country.

== Corporate career ==
Sinodinos left his position as the Prime Minister's Chief of Staff to become a director with the investment bank Goldman Sachs JBWere, and a regional general manager at the National Australia Bank; he reportedly declined an offer to become Australian Ambassador to the United States. In 2008, he was part of a panel that mediated public input into the Defence White Paper. In March 2009, he was appointed a managing director at the National Australia Bank.

Sinodinos became a director of Australian Water Holdings Pty Ltd (AWH) in 2008 and chairman in 2010. He resigned from these positions on becoming a senator.

== Political career ==
Sinodinos was appointed to fill the vacant New South Wales Senate seat opened by the resignation of Helen Coonan on 13 October 2011. He served as honorary Finance Director (2009 to 2011) and President (2011–2012) for the NSW branch of the Liberal Party. Initially touted as a candidate for the lower house seat of Bradfield, Sinodinos was appointed to the Australian Senate representing New South Wales, replacing the resigned Liberal Senator Helen Coonan for the remainder of her term, which was due to expire on 30 June 2014. At the 2013 election he was elected to a further six-year term from 1 July 2014 to 30 June 2020. Howard was present in Parliament when Sinodinos delivered his maiden speech.

Sinodinos is a member of the board of Global Panel Foundation – Australasia, a non-governmental organisation.

During 2012 Sinodinos was a regular columnist, writing in The Australian.

On 19 March 2014, Sinodinos stood aside from his role as Assistant Treasurer prior to giving evidence as a witness before New South Wales's Independent Commission Against Corruption (ICAC). During the enquiry Sinodinos advised he was unaware of a $74,000 donation made to the Liberal Party by Australian Water Holdings, despite being Deputy chairman on a $200,000 salary. At the time of the payment Sinodinos was also Treasurer of the Liberal Party. He formally resigned on 19 December 2014 as Assistant Treasurer and was succeeded as Assistant Treasurer by Josh Frydenberg. ICAC eventually made no adverse findings against Sinodinos.

In January 2017, Sussan Ley temporarily stood aside as the Minister for Health and Aged Care and Minister for Sport and then subsequently resigned from the ministry. Sinodinos briefly acted in her portfolios until a subsequent rearrangement of the Turnbull ministry where Sinodinos was appointed as the Minister for Industry, Innovation and Science. In October 2017, Sinodinos took leave from parliament and the ministry to aid his recovery from an unnamed type of cancer. He "believes the prognosis is very positive and that the cancer is eminently treatable". This was later revealed to be a stage four non-Hodgkin lymphoma, for which Sinodinos required a bone marrow transplant. He was voluntarily removed from cabinet in the December 2017 rearrangement.

On 1 May 2023, The Asia Group announced that Sinodinos will chair the organization's new Australia practice.

== Ambassador to the United States ==
In May 2019, it was announced that Sinodinos would be appointed the next Australian Ambassador to the United States. He resigned as a member of the Senate on 11 November 2019. He replaced Joe Hockey as ambassador on 7 February 2020.

== Honours ==
Sinodinos was appointed an Officer of the Order of Australia in 2008 for service to politics through the executive function of government, to the development of economic policy and reform, and to the Greek community.

== Personal ==
Sinodinos lives in New South Wales with his wife, whom he met at a Greek Orthodox Church, and their three children. He has been a director of the Mary MacKillop Foundation.

Parliament of Australia
Preceded by Helen Coonan	Senator for New South Wales; 2011–2019	Succeeded by Jim Molan
Political offices
Preceded by David Bradbury	Assistant Treasurer of Australia; 2013–2014	Succeeded by Josh Frydenberg
Preceded by Alan Griffin	Cabinet Secretary; 2015–2017	Succeeded by None
Preceded by Greg Hunt	Minister for Industry, Innovation and Science; 2017	Succeeded by Karen Andrews
Diplomatic posts
Preceded by Joe Hockey	Australian Ambassador to the United States; 2020–2023	Succeeded by Kevin Rudd
