= Department of Broadband, Communications and the Digital Economy =

Australian government department, 2007–2013

Department overview
- Formed: 3 December 2007
- Preceding Department: Department of Communications, Information Technology and the Arts
- Dissolved: 18 September 2013
- Superseding Department: Department of Communications
- Jurisdiction: Commonwealth of Australia
- Headquarters: Canberra
- Employees: 679 (at April 2013)
- Annual budget: A$113.190 million (2012/2013)
- Minister responsible: Stephen Conroy, Minister for Broadband, Communications and the Digital Economy
- Department executives: Drew Clarke, Secretary (2013); Peter Harris, Secretary (2009–2012); Patricia Scott, Secretary (2007–2009)
- Child agencies: Australian Communications and Media Authority; NBN Co Limited; Australian Broadcasting Corporation; Australian Postal Corporation; Special Broadcasting Service Corporation; Telecommunications Universal Service Management Agency
- Website: www.dbcde.gov.au

The Australian Department of Broadband, Communications and the Digital Economy is a former department of the Government of Australia that was charged with the responsibility to help develop a vibrant, sustainable and internationally competitive broadband, broadcasting and communications sector and, through this, promote the digital economy for the benefit of all Australians.

The department was formed in 2007 and dissolved in 2013. Its functions were assumed by the newly created Department of Communications.

== Operational functions ==
In the Administrative Arrangements Order of 3 December 2007, the functions of the department were broadly classified into the following matters:

- Broadband policy and programs
- Postal and telecommunications policies and programs
- Spectrum policy management
- Broadcasting policy
- National policy issues relating to the digital economy
- Content policy relating to the information economy

== Department programs ==
- The Higher Bandwidth Incentive Scheme (HiBIS) was a strategy which ran from 2004 to 2007 to provide registered Internet service providers with incentive payments to supply higher bandwidth services in regional, rural and remote areas at prices comparable to those available in metropolitan areas.
- The Australia Connected package was announced on 18 June 2007. Up to $958 million ($600 million from Broadband Connect Infrastructure Program funding and an additional $358 million in funding) was allocated towards a new national wholesale network which was stated to deliver high speed broadband to rural and regional Australia by June 2009.
