= Tim Gartrell =

Australian political activist (born 1970)

Chief of Staff to the Prime Minister of Australia
- Incumbent
- Assumed office 23 May 2022
- Prime Minister: Anthony Albanese
- Preceded by: John Kunkel

National Secretary of the Australian Labor Party
- In office 2 September 2003 – 20 September 2008
- Preceded by: Geoff Walsh
- Succeeded by: Karl Bitar

Personal details
- Born: 1970 (age 55–56) Orange, New South Wales
- Party: Labor
- Education: University of New South Wales; University of South Australia

Tim Gartrell (born 1970) is an Australian political advisor currently serving as the Chief of Staff to the Prime Minister of Australia under Anthony Albanese. He previously served as the National Secretary of the Australian Labor Party between 2003 and 2008, overseeing Labor's federal election campaigns in 2004 and 2007. Gartrell was also the Campaign Director for the 'Yes' campaign in favour of marriage equality at the 2017 Australian Marriage Law Postal Survey.

== Early life ==
Gartrell was born in 1970 in Orange, New South Wales.

He was raised by his parents, David and Carolyn Gartrell, on an orchard. His parents fostered a number of children in addition to Tim as well as his brother Brett and sister Katrina. Gartrell notes the impact of living with foster children as a teenager as significant on his politics.

In 1987, Gartrell and his school's team won the state debating championships.

After finishing school, he moved to Sydney to study in 1989.

== Career ==
Gartrell started his career as an advocate and researcher in the Australian union movement, while studying a Bachelor of Arts part-time at the University of NSW.

Gartrell then worked as an adviser for Keating government ministers, Frank Walker and Jeannette McHugh. He then worked in the Beazley Federal Opposition for Anthony Albanese. Following this work, he worked as the assistant to the mayor of the South Sydney Council.

He joined the staff of the Australian Labor Party National Secretariat in 1998 serving as Assistant National Secretary of the Australian Labor Party from April 2000. He was elected unopposed as National Secretary on 2 September 2003.

Following the ALP's defeat at the 2004 election, Gartrell pursued reform of the campaigning structures of the Party.

Gartrell is recognised as one of the driving forces behind Labor's successful 2007 election campaign, which saw the Party return to power after more than 11 years in Opposition. Through a creative use of new campaign techniques and advertising, Labor's campaign was seen to be superior to the Liberal Party campaign and won a series of media awards. As a key member of Labor's Political Strategy Group, Gartrell worked closely with Kevin Rudd from his ascension to the Labor leadership, through to Rudd's election as Prime Minister. Prime Minister Kevin Rudd described Gartrell's leadership skills as "superb" and stated "[h]is ability, hard work, judgment and campaign leadership skills are first class".

Gartrell announced his resignation from the position on 30 September 2008 to become CEO of market research firm Auspoll which is part of the larger Photon group of media companies. He left that post in 2010 to become CEO of Indigenous employment advocacy charity GenerationOne. In 2012, Gartrell was recruited by Reconciliation Australia to lead the "Recognise" campaign team, as campaign manager. The Recognise campaign advocated for constitutional recognition of Aboriginal and Torres Strait Islander people. Tanya Hosch was joint campaign director, and also the public face of the campaign.

Shortly after the announcement of the Australian Marriage Law Postal Survey, Gartrell was appointed Campaign Director by the 'yes' side in favour of marriage equality. He led the campaign to a resounding success, with 61.6% of Australians voting in favour of marriage equality, representing a higher vote than any two-party preferred electoral vote in Australian history. He served as Vice-President of NSW Labor in 2019.

Gartrell was appointed as the Chief of Staff to Leader of the Opposition Anthony Albanese in June 2019. Following the 2022 federal election, he became the Prime Minister's Chief of Staff.

== Personal life ==
Gartrell holds a Bachelor of Arts from the University of New South Wales. He also holds a master's degree in communications studies from the University of South Australia.

He is a member of the Advisory Council of the University of New South Wales Faculty of Arts and Social Sciences.

Party political offices
Preceded by Geoff Walsh	National Secretary of the Australian Labor Party; 2003–2008	Succeeded by Karl Bitar
