= Tony Eggleton =

Australian political consultant (1932–2023)

Tony Eggleton, AO, CVO (30 April 1932 − 20 May 2023) was an Australian political consultant who was the Federal Director of the Liberal Party of Australia. He first came to public prominence as the press secretary to the Prime Minister of Australia, Harold Holt, at the time of the latter's disappearance and presumed drowning in December 1967.

== Biography ==
Eggleton was born in the United Kingdom and educated at King Alfred's College in Wantage, Berkshire. He was a cub reporter on his hometown paper in Swindon, Wiltshire, when in 1950 he was invited to undertake work experience with the Bendigo Advertiser in Australia. He later joined the Australian Broadcasting Commission and played a role with the introduction of television in Australia in 1956. In 1960 he became director of public relations for the Royal Australian Navy. In 1963 he was the Foundation President of the National Press Club in Canberra.

In his position with the Navy, he handled the media and public affairs issues arising from Australia's worst peacetime naval disaster in 1964 (the sinking of HMAS Voyager, with the loss of 82 lives). This brought him to the attention of the Prime Minister, Sir Robert Menzies, who hired him as his press secretary in 1965. When Menzies retired in January 1966, his successor Harold Holt kept Eggleton on.

On 17 December 1967, Holt went swimming near the holiday resort of Portsea, south of Melbourne. He disappeared in the surf and despite an extensive search, his remains were never found. Eggleton became a public figure, frequently appearing on television, as he dealt with the intense domestic and international media interest in the search for Holt and subsequent events.

Eggleton was retained as press secretary by Holt's successor, John Gorton, and in 1970 he played a leading role in organising the tour of Australia by Queen Elizabeth II. In 1971 Eggeleton was appointed Director of Information at the Commonwealth Secretariat in London. In 1974 he returned to Australia as an adviser to Billy Snedden, Leader of the Liberal Party, which had been in Opposition since 1972. This role ended when Malcolm Fraser defeated Snedden for the Liberal leadership in March 1975.

Fraser appointed Eggleton as his chief of staff and this led to Eggleton's appointment as Federal Director of the Liberal Party, a post he held for 15 years. In this capacity he was the party's Campaign Director at seven federal elections (1975, 1977, 1980, 1983, 1984, 1987 and 1990), under three different leaders (Fraser, Andrew Peacock and John Howard). The Liberals won the first three of these elections, but were defeated by the Australian Labor Party in 1983. After the Liberals' fourth successive defeat in 1990, Eggleton resigned, although few blamed him for the party's failure at this time. Andrew Robb replaced Eggleton as Federal Director.

In 1991 Eggleton was appointed secretary-general of CARE International, one of the world's largest private international humanitarian organisations. He retired from this position in Brussels in 1995 and later became chairman of CARE Australia. He was a board member of the National Stroke Foundation from 1997 to 2003. From 1998 to 2005 he was chairman of the Asia Pacific Democratic Union, a federation of conservative political parties in the Asia-Pacific region. In 1999 he was appointed to the editorial board of Foreign Affairs and in 2002 as a member of the Australian Government's Aid Advisory Council

In 1997 the government appointed Eggleton Chief executive for Australia's programme to celebrate the Centenary of Federation (1901–2001).

In 2002 he became chairman of the C.E.W. Bean Foundation, named after Australia's best-known war correspondent and military historian.

In 2006 he was appointed by the government to chair the consultative council of the Centre for Democratic Institutions, a new body set up with bipartisan support to support the promotion of democracy in Australia's region.

With his wife Mary, Tony Eggleton has three children, Andrew, Stephen, and Judith.

Eggleton died on 20 May 2023, at the age of 91. Following his death, the Liberal Party paid tribute to him.

== Honours ==
The Queen appointed Eggleton a Commander of the Royal Victorian Order (CVO) in 1970 and he was made an Officer of the Order of Australia (AO) in 1991.

At the start of Australia's Centenary of Federation commemorations on 1 January 2001, he was awarded the Centenary Medal.

== Sources ==
- Who's Who in Australia
