= Department of Communications (1993–94) =

Australian government department

Department overview
- Formed: 23 December 1993
- Preceding Department: Department of Transport and Communications
- Dissolved: 30 January 1994
- Superseding Department: Department of Communications and the Arts
- Jurisdiction: Commonwealth of Australia
- Minister responsible: Michael Lee, Minister for Communications
- Department executive: Neville Stevens, Secretary

The Department of Communications was an Australian government department that existed between December 1993 and January 1994.

== Scope ==
Information about the department's functions and government funding allocation could be found in the Administrative Arrangements Orders, the annual Portfolio Budget Statements and in the Department's annual reports.

At its creation, the Department was responsible for:

- Postal and telecommunications services
- Management of the electromagnetic spectrum
- Broadcasting services

== Structure ==
The Department was an Australian Public Service department, staffed by officials who were responsible to the Minister for Communications, Michael Lee. The Secretary of the Department was Neville Stevens.
