= Department of Communications, Information Technology and the Arts =

Australian government department, 1998–2007

Department of Communications, Information Technology and the Arts (DCITA)
Department overview
- Formed: 21 October 1998
- Preceding Department: Department of Communications and the Arts
- Dissolved: 3 December 2007
- Superseding Department: Department of Broadband, Communications and the Digital Economy
- Jurisdiction: Commonwealth of Australia
- Ministers responsible: Richard Alston, Minister (1998–2003); Daryl Williams, Minister (2003–2004); Helen Coonan, Minister (2004–2007)
- Department executives: Neville Stevens, Secretary (1998–2001); Ian Watt, Secretary (2001); Helen Williams, Secretary (2001–2007); Patricia Scott, Secretary (2007)
- Website: dcita.gov.au

The Department of Communications, Information Technology and the Arts (DCITA) was an Australian government department that existed between October 1998 and December 2007. The department was closed on 3 December 2007 and its authority was transferred to the Department of Broadband, Communications and the Digital Economy.

== Scope ==
While operational, information about the department's functions and government funding allocation originally could be found in the Administrative Arrangements Orders, the annual Portfolio Budget Statements and in the department's annual reports. At the time of its creation, the department was responsible for:

- Australia's postal and telecommunications services
- Management of the electromagnetic spectrum
- Broadcasting services
- Management of government records
- Centenary of federation
- Cultural affairs, including support for the arts
- National policy issues relating to the information economy
- Information and communication industries development, electronic commerce and business on-line and year 2000 issues
- Government on-line delivery and information technology and communications management, excluding IT outsourcing

== Structure ==
The department was an Australian Public Service department, staffed by officials who were responsible to the Minister for Communications, Information Technology and the Arts.

== Arrangements for outside participation and public involvement ==
The department had an ongoing involvement with the following bodies some of which played a role in consulting with the community and industry:

- Collections Council of Australia
- Committee on Taxation Incentives for the Arts
- Community Broadcasting Foundation
- Contemporary Music Touring Program Committee
- Cultural Ministers Council (CMC)
- Digital Content Industry Action Agenda Strategic Industry Leaders Group
- Festivals Australia Committee
- Film Certification Advisory Board
- Media and Communications Council (MACC)
- National Portrait Gallery Board
- Networking the Nation Board
- Online Council
- Online and Communications Council including its Regional Communications and Indigenous Telecommunications Working Groups
- Playing Australia Committee
- Public Lending Right (PLR) Committee
- Sport and Recreation Ministers Council (SR MC)
- Visions of Australia Committee

== Sources ==
Department of Communications, Information Technology and the Arts (1999). "Department of Communications, Information Technology and the Arts Annual Report 1998-1999". Annual Report. Commonwealth of Australia. ISSN 1323-3491.

Department of Communications, Information Technology and the Arts (2000). "Department of Communications, Information Technology and the Arts Annual Report 1999-2000". Report by the Commissioner for Superannuation on the General Administration and Operation of the Papua New Guinea Superannuation Scheme and the Contract Officers Retirement Benefits Scheme for the Year Ended 30 June. Commonwealth of Australia. ISSN 0727-4181.

Department of Communications, Information Technology and the Arts (2001). "Department of Communications, Information Technology and the Arts Annual Report 2000-2001". Annual Report. Commonwealth of Australia. ISSN 1443-8275.

Department of Communications, Information Technology and the Arts (2002). "Department of Communications, Information Technology and the Arts Annual Report 2001-02". Annual Report. Commonwealth of Australia. ISSN 1443-8275.

Department of Communications, Information Technology and the Arts (2003). "Department of Communications, Information Technology and the Arts Annual Report 2002-03". Annual Report. Commonwealth of Australia. ISSN 1443-8275.

Department of Communications, Information Technology and the Arts (2004). "Department of Communications, Information Technology and the Arts Annual Report 2003-04". Annual Report. Commonwealth of Australia. ISSN 1443-8275.

Department of Communications, Information Technology and the Arts (2005). "Department of Communications, Information Technology and the Arts Annual Report 2004-05". Annual Report. Commonwealth of Australia. ISSN 1443-8275.

Department of Communications, Information Technology and the Arts (2006). "Department of Communications, Information Technology and the Arts Annual Report 2005-06". Annual Report. Commonwealth of Australia. ISSN 1443-8275.

Department of Communications, Information Technology and the Arts (2007). "Department of Communications, Information Technology and the Arts Annual Report 2006-07". Annual Report. Commonwealth of Australia. ISSN 1443-8275.
