= Department of Communications and the Arts (1994–1998) =

Australian government department

Department overview
- Formed: 30 January 1994
- Preceding Department: Department of Communications (II)
- Dissolved: 21 October 1998
- Superseding Department: Department of Communications, Information Technology and the Arts Department of the Environment and Heritage
- Jurisdiction: Commonwealth of Australia
- Headquarters: Canberra
- Ministers responsible: Michael Lee, Minister for Communications and the Arts (1994–1996); Richard Alston, Minister for Communications and the Arts (1996–1998)
- Department executive: Neville Stevens, Secretary
- Website: dca.gov.au

The Department of Communications and the Arts was an Australian government department that existed between January 1994 and October 1998.

== Scope ==
Information about the department's functions and government funding allocation could be found in the Administrative Arrangements Orders, the annual Portfolio Budget Statements and in the Department's annual reports.

At its creation, the Department was responsible for:

- Postal and telecommunications services;
- Management of the electromagnetic spectrum;
- Broadcasting services;
- Management of government records; and
- Cultural affairs, including support for the arts.

== Structure ==
The Department was an Australian Public Service department, staffed by officials who were responsible to the Minister for Communications and the Arts, Michael Lee and then Richard Alston.
