= Paul Wild (Australian scientist) =

Australian radio-physicist (1923–2008)

Paul Wild AC CBE FRS FRSA FTSE FAA
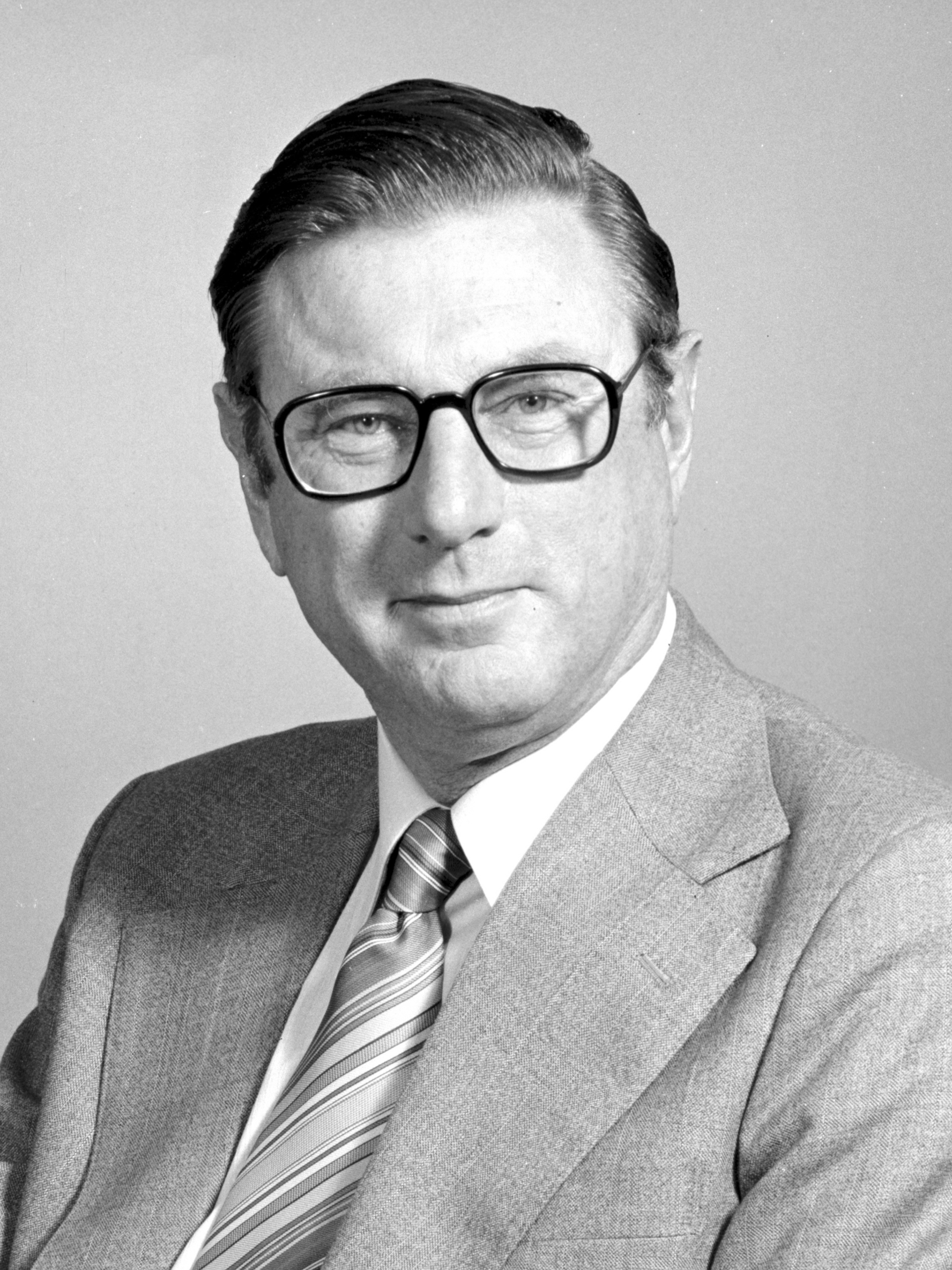
- Wild when Chairman of CSIRO

Chairman of CSIRO
- In office 14 December 1978 – 24 September 1985
- Preceded by: Victor Burgmann
- Succeeded by: Norman Boardman

Personal details
- Born: 17 May 1923 Sheffield, England
- Died: 10 May 2008 (aged 84) Canberra, Australia
- Education: Peterhouse, Cambridge
- Occupation: Radio astronomy, solar physics, microwave navigation
- Known for: Radio observations of the Sun, invention of microwave landing system, chairmanship of CSIRO, instigation of Very Fast Train project

John Paul Wild (17 May 1923 – 10 May 2008) was a British-born Australian scientist. Following service in World War II as a radar officer in the Royal Navy, he became a radio astronomer in Australia for the Council for Scientific and Industrial Research, the fore-runner of the CSIRO. In the 1950s and 1960s he made discoveries based on radio observations of the Sun. In the late 1960s and early 1970s his team built and operated the world's first solar radio-spectrographs and subsequently the Culgoora radio-heliograph, near Narrabri, New South Wales. The Paul Wild Observatory at Culgoora is named after him.

In 1972 Paul Wild invented Interscan, a standard microwave landing system. From 1978 to 1985 he was chairman of CSIRO, during which time he expanded the organisation's scope and directed its restructuring. He retired from CSIRO to lead (from 1986) the Very Fast Train Joint Venture, a private sector project that sought to build a high-speed railway between Australia's two most populous cities. Lack of support from government brought it to an end in 1991. In his later years he worked on gravitational theory.

== Early life ==
John Paul Wild was born in Sheffield, England on 17 May 1923, the fourth son of wealthy cutlery manufacturer, Alwyn Wild, and his wife Bessie. But in that year, Alwyn's business collapsed and he went to the United States of America to sell his patents and technology for cutlery manufacture. In the event, he never returned. Bessie moved with her boys to Croydon, near London. About this Wild said "We went from riches to rags and the family was absolutely struggling" (Note: Quotes in this article from Paul Wild's interviews are from four sources, namely: two books containing a chapter on him – i.e., Moyal 1994 and Bhathal 1996, listed in full in the select bibliography above and using these short forms in the citations under "References" below (other than the first, full citation); and; transcripts of the two original interviews on which the book chapters were based – i.e., Wild, interview, 1992 and Wild, interview, 1995 – also listed in full in the select bibliography above and using these short forms in the citations under "References" below (other than the first, full citation).; The books provide accounts that are necessarily condensed. For serious study of the fields encompassed by Paul Wild's career and their political and historical contexts, the interview transcripts are a more detailed, and in places more candid, source.) and "... right on the breadline, very, very poor." It was to be five or six years before a divorce settlement allowed the family to "live a reasonable middle-class life, reasonably well off".

His childhood was a happy one, with his "imperialistic grandfather" having a strong influence in his upbringing. At age six he was hospitalised for six months after being hit by a lorry when alighting from a tram, cracking his skull. Then at age seven he attended a Sussex boarding school, Ardingly College, the youngest boy in the school and very homesick. But after successfully "plotting to get out" with his elder brother for four terms he spent the rest of his schooling at Croydon: first at The Limes (Old Palace of John Whitgift School) – at that time a preparatory school – then at the associated senior independent (Note: In UK parlance, a "public" school.) school, Whitgift School.

The driving intellectual curiosity that was to distinguish Paul Wild was evident from an early age. He said, "[My mother] showed great appreciation if ever I was successful in anything but she didn't push me." He was interested in building things with model house kits, Meccano and cardboard; an early gift of a Hornby train from his mother started him on his lifelong love of trains. Then he "read about the great man Isambard Kingdom Brunel and all his works, which were not only railways but the extraordinary ships that he built at the time. Well, I suppose he was the first source of inspiration to me."

He became an avid player and follower of cricket while at school and into adulthood: in his later life he was known as "a walking encyclopaedia of cricket knowledge", eventually owning all but one edition of Wisden Cricketers' Almanack.

Wild developed a strong love of mathematics from a very early age. After matriculating he spent three years in the mathematical sixth form, most of the time on mathematics, with a little physics and world affairs. In free periods he and his friends would play bridge, under the chestnut trees in summertime. In an interview in 1992 he said: "We had three specialist mathematics teachers covering analysis, calculus and modern geometry, and I think I owe a lot to them."

Whitgift School is near what was then Croydon Aerodrome. In the summer of 1940, real excitement was added to the lives of the bridge-playing mathematics students: the Battle of Britain was going on overhead. "There was no sense of danger, it was all marvellous fun. Croydon [a Spitfire and Hurricane base] was right in the thick of it, and we used to watch the air battles going on."

== Physics by accident ==
World War II determined Paul Wild's specialisation and intruded to foreshorten his entire university life to only five terms. In 1942, Wild went to the University of Cambridge (Peterhouse) to further his mathematics. However, after a year of mathematics he knew that he would only be able to stay on if he did something relevant to the national war effort. Thus he went straight into "physics with radio": Part 2 Physics. He said

the great majority of people in Part 2 Physics had already done two years of it before, so it was a real challenge. But I enjoyed it very much, and I was very inspired by the sort of grandeur of the approach, the wonders of quantum mechanics and relativity …. It was hard work, it was six days a week. That's how I became a physicist.

After the second year, having concluded five terms in all, he had a choice of joining one of the three armed services or going into radar research or industry. On his "free" day each week he had been trained in the Home Guard, but his great interest in ships and the sea led him to join the Royal Navy. A wartime Bachelor of Arts degree was conferred a year later. A few years afterwards he paid five pounds to become a Master of Arts. Then ten years after that, he sent his research papers to the University of Cambridge and following a two-year deliberation the degree of Doctor of Science was conferred. (Note: The degrees were conferred in 1943 (BA), 1950 (MA) and 1962 (ScD). Later in his life, the honorary degree of DSc was conferred by both the Australian National University and the University of Newcastle.)

== Wartime naval service ==
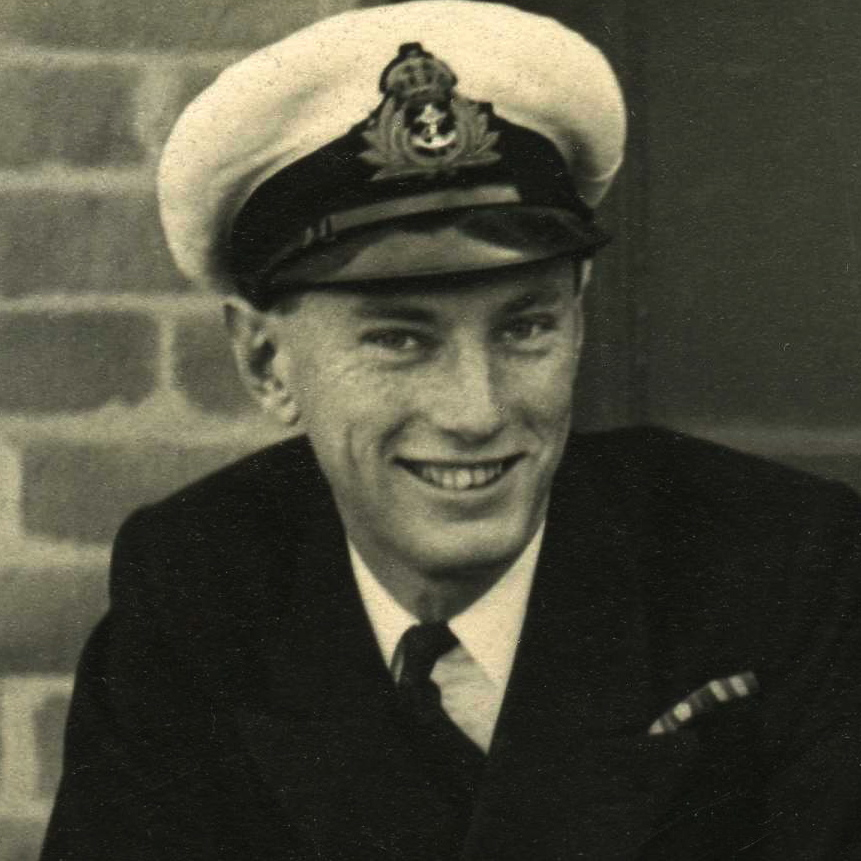
Paul Wild, commissioned as a radar officer in the Royal Navy during World War II at age 20, was in charge of radar operation on HMS King George V

Paul Wild became one of the young radar officers who ensured the Royal Navy used its new technology to maximum effect. In July 1943, commissioned as a Probationary Temporary Acting Sub-lieutenant (Special Branch, Royal Navy Volunteer Reserve), he started an intensive, six-month radar officer training course at the Royal Navy base, Portsmouth. His seagoing appointment for the following two and a half years, with 60 subordinates and 24 radar sets, was the battleship HMS King George V, which eventually became flagship of the British Pacific Fleet. The ship took part in the Okinawa campaign, followed by the assault on the Japanese mainland. In both campaigns the fleet was frequently attacked by Japanese suicide bombers, but because they tended to concentrate on aircraft carriers, his ship was not hit. The battleship entered Tokyo Bay just after the surrender of Japan and he was present when the peace treaty was signed.

The Royal Navy was innovative in the way it incorporated information from the ship's new radar into its gunnery, with a direct line of communication from the radar officer to the bridge. Wild described the thrill of seeing range-finding projectiles on his cathode ray oscilloscope in the darkened radar room, appearing as spikes straddling the target, then the third shot hitting the target in the middle.

Despite the Royal Navy's innovation in its use of radar, an underlying aversion to new technology persisted among some senior naval officers. He recalled a remark by his admiral at the end of hostilities: "Now we can get back, young Wild, to being a proper navy – without your radar".

On returning to England, Wild taught radar to permanent naval officers until early 1947. During one of his wartime breaks in Australia he had become engaged to a young Sydney woman, Elaine Hull, whose family had offered hospitality; and on leaving the Royal Navy he immediately sailed for Sydney. He had asked his fiancée to go to England to be married, but she told him he would have to settle in Australia. As his future brother-in-law later observed, "Australia has my sister to thank for giving this country one of its greatest scientists".

== "Humble" start in Australia ==
From London, Wild had obtained an assistant research officer job with the Council for Scientific and Industrial Research at the Radiophysics Laboratory near Sydney. He described the position as "a humble one": to maintain and develop test equipment. But within a year he had, as he put it, "wheedled his way" into the new science of radio astronomy, and he described 1948–50 as

a tremendously exciting time.... The only two really powerful groups in radio astronomy were the Australian one and Cambridge; and... we all thought we had the edge over the Cambridge group. [Australian wartime radio expert] Joe Pawsey was the sort of father of radio astronomy in Australia. He was a wonderfully inspiring leader, very self-effacing and taking no credit for himself, and he was a delight to work under. And he did something which I appreciated greatly: he left me alone to do my own research but I could come to him at any time and get his advice.

This advice, Wild acknowledged, "was often very perceptive, very good". Pawsey's approach became a template that Wild would follow.

In the 15 years from 1949, the solar group that Wild had joined and which he soon came to lead achieved an international reputation in solar radiophysics. Their instruments revealed for the first time the presence of charged particles and shock waves travelling through the solar corona, and their potential effects on "space weather". The group's innovative design of observation equipment and ground-breaking investigations into the nature of solar radio bursts and the disturbances that gave rise to them cleared the way to classifying most types of bursts by their spectral appearance and presenting models to interpret their characteristics.

== Solar burst discoveries ==
The new breed of electronic astronomers that Paul Wild joined were applying their wartime skills to radiophysics research, the Radiophysics Laboratory having achieved a number of successes since it was established, early in the war, to bring radar to Australia. In 1948, groups at the laboratory were studying several fields in addition to solar. Wild's work arose from the phenomenon of embryonic radar technology sometimes being jammed by mysterious interference, later discovered, in England, to be radio noise coming from the Sun.

When Wild joined the solar group there were two teams from which to choose. He chose to work for Lindsay McCready in building a radiospectrograph, at the suggestion of Pawsey. As he later said, "I knew if I joined McCready I would be able to do my own thing … That's why I became a solar man".

The spectrograph – the first ever built – looked at the spectrum of bursts of radiations from the Sun over a wide spectral range for frequencies from 40 to 70 megahertz. It produced some spectacular results, demonstrating the great complexity of burst and storm phenomena. At Penrith, 50 kilometres west of Sydney in the foothills of the Blue Mountains, a fairly primitive wooden aerial was pulled around with ropes, and every twenty minutes it was changed so that it pointed towards the Sun. The data were analysed after four months of observations. In the first paper, published in 1950, he wrote: "We have identified three distinct spectral types of burst and … we shall call them Type I, Type II and Type III."

Wild's team now needed a site for a new, better engineered and more powerful radiospectrograph and a large swept-frequency interferometer with which to observe the radio source. In September 1950, he and three colleagues borrowed a decrepit ex-military ambulance and with a spectrum analyser assessed potential sites on the outskirts of Sydney and down the New South Wales south coast that would be least affected by interference from radio transmissions. They chose a grazing property outside Dapto, 15 kilometres south of Wollongong, shielded by a 1500-foot mountain. Here the Radiophysics Solar Group went from strength to strength, to the extent that Wild later said "there was no question that we were the world champions". Professor Marcel Minnaert, the eminent Belgian astronomer, wrote in 1963:

The history of solar radio-spectroscopy is mainly the history of Australian work on this subject. ... At each meeting of the International Astronomical Union, highly competent specialists such as Wild [and Smerd and Christianson, headed by Pawsey] … were able to announce spectacular progress.

This work was done in primitive buildings and facilities. The equipment hut comprised a minute workshop at one end, an office in the middle and another minute room at the other end, used as a kitchen and after-work gathering place while dinner was prepared: after returning from the pub, conversation would be animated as one of them hammered veal then cooked wiener schnitzel in an atmosphere "thick with fug". Staff members, who spent several days per week there, slept and ate in an adjacent single-roomed weatherboard hut with a table down the middle and camp stretchers around the sides. But among these achievers, morale and excitement was very high and their social life was lively. Colleagues from the days at Dapto, describing Wild – as many did – as "colleague, mentor and good friend" said " He could light up a room with his wit, intelligence and charm. He loved a party and a few beers."

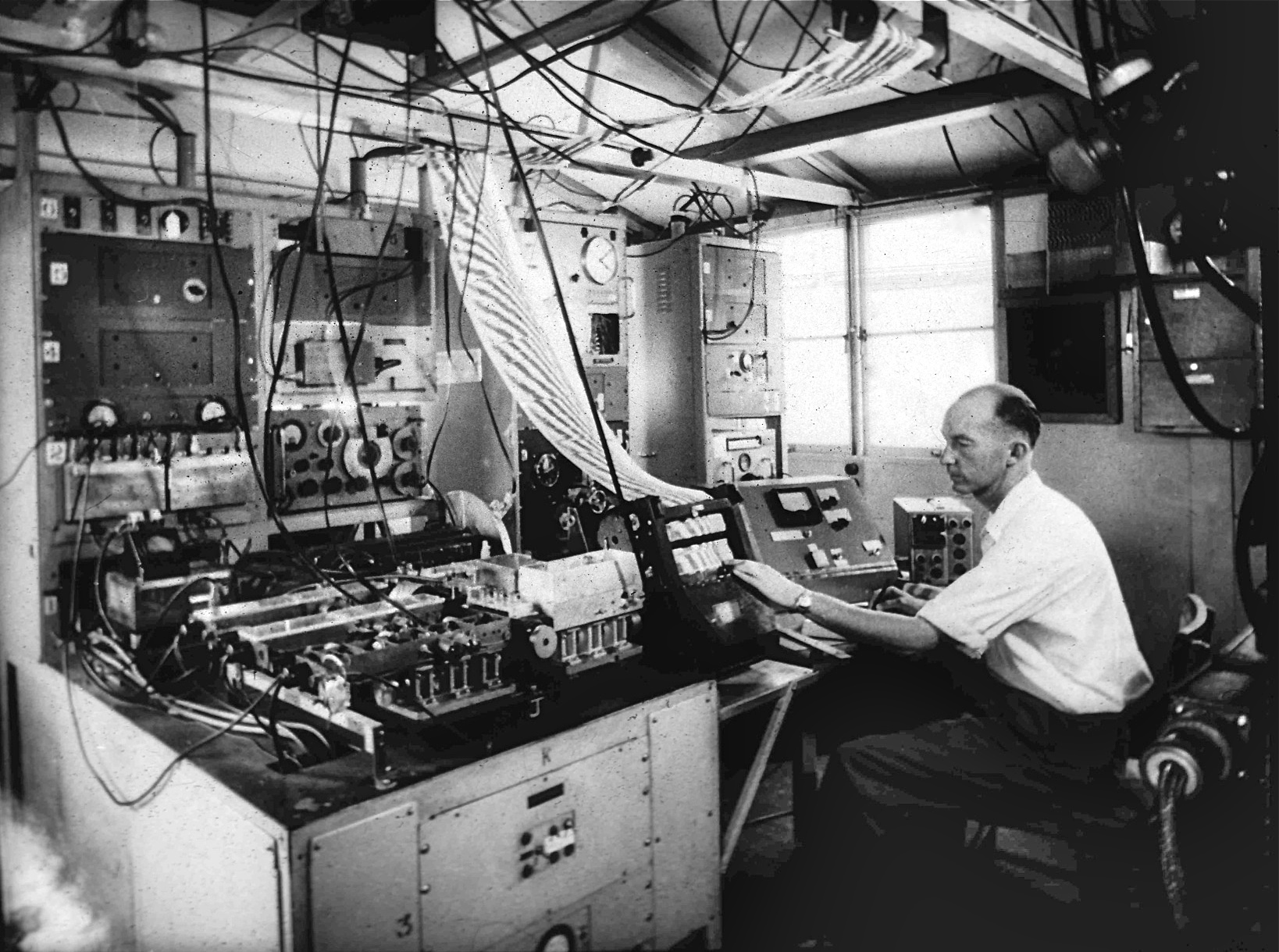
Chief electronics engineer Kevin Sheridan receiving data in the makeshift Dapto radiospectrograph room. Paul Wild always acknowledged him as the "man who put it all together" – a difficult job with the nascent technology of the time. Sheridan's hand is on a very early fax machine, borrowed from a newspaper publisher.

The bursts were distinguished by the way the frequency drifted with time. The team deduced that the type II bursts were associated with shock waves coming out through the solar atmosphere at 1000 km/s and were associated, 30 hours later, with aurora in the Earth's night sky. They had discovered the answer to a century-old riddle: what was the agency that conveyed the disturbance from the solar flare to the Earth? Type II bursts continue to be closely monitored by spectrographs on the ground and in satellites for "space weather" reporting, since their disruption of the geomagnetic field and ionosphere can cause blackouts to radio communication and the systems of navigational and other satellites.

Wild's team associated type III bursts with streams of electrons being ejected at a third the speed of light and taking less than half an hour to reach the Earth. This theory was confirmed when American physicists using satellite data regularly detected bursts of electrons 25 minutes or so after solar flares. This was one component of a much wider research program.

The mechanisms proved to be correct and their naming of the phenomena became the international standard. Wild likened this research to the study of taxonomy that preceded Darwin's Origin of species. His analysis of the anatomy of the solar flares and his development of the physical interpretation culminated in a unified model that integrated the apparently complex radio flare phenomena in the solar chromosphere, solar corona, and in the interplanetary space.

In the course of this solar work, Wild became interested in the radio spectrum of hydrogen and wrote up an internal report related to the potential for spectral lines in the solar bursts. When Ewen and Purcell in the US first observed the 1420 MHz transition in 1951, he went back to his report, generalised it to include the interstellar medium, and six months later published the first detailed theoretical paper on the hydrogen lines – a classic in the field.

== World lead in solar research ==
Wild's team then built and from 1967 operated a three-kilometre diameter radio-heliograph at Culgoora, near Narrabri in northern New South Wales. It was to become a ground-breaking instrument producing real-time images of solar activity across a range of altitudes from the Sun's surface. In the late 1960s and early 1970s the team led the world in solar research, attracting prominent solar physicists from around the world.

Until then, all results from the solar radio-spectrographs had been inferred from studying the Sun by looking at its spectrum with only very limited angular resolution. Wild wanted to

actually see what these phenomena looked like on the Sun, actually get a moving picture of them. The frequency range that we were interested in was around about the metre wavelengths. To get the resolution roughly equivalent to that of the human eye at these long wavelengths required an aperture some three kilometres in diameter. So I devised a method of synthesising a three kilometre aperture with 96 antennas in a ring.

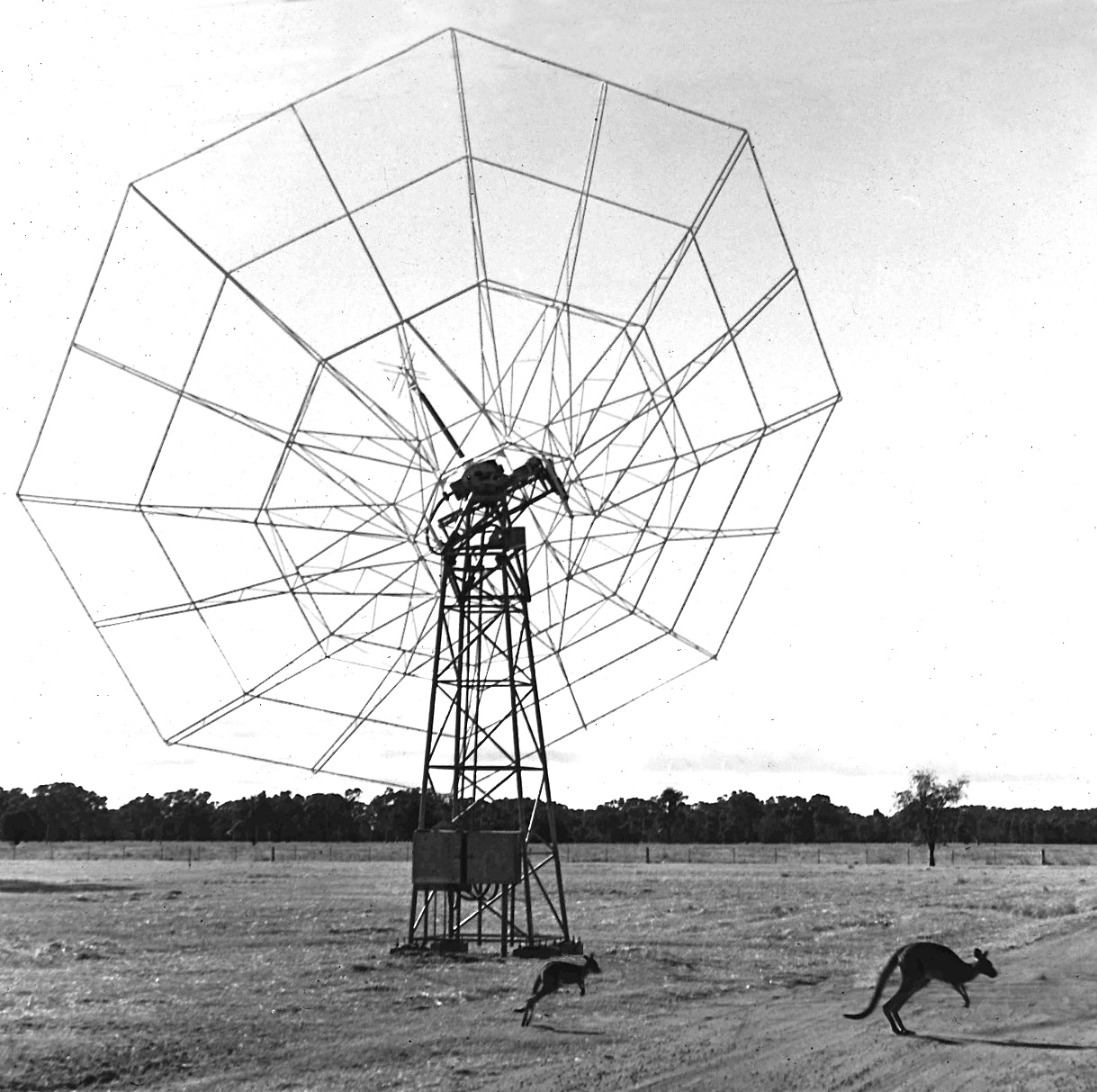
To "actually see what solar phenomena looked like on the Sun", Paul Wild built 96 of these antennas in a 3 kilometre ring at Culgoora, New South Wales – the world's first radio-heliograph.

With Pawsey's help, £630,000 was raised from the Ford Foundation to build the Culgoora radio-heliograph. Years later he was to admit "When I think back I wonder how I had the nerve to do it." The heliograph stayed in operation for 17 years from 1967, providing a huge amount of data and insight into the way the solar corona works and the relationship between solar and terrestrial phenomena. Wild published more than 70 papers in this field. The heliograph also played a leading supporting role in both the Skylab missions of 1973–74 and the solar maximum mission of 1980–81, providing real-time observations of coronal activity. It was de-commissioned in 1984 to make way for the Australia Telescope Compact Array and transferred to the Ionospheric Prediction Service, where it is still used today for space weather monitoring of solar activity. Now there are at least 20 ground-based radio-spectrographs operating around the world.

Although Wild wrote most of the papers, he was characteristically generous in giving credit to others, saying "I did put other people's names on them because they'd made important contributions". One, for example, was technical assistant Bill Rowe. During a period when the solar cycle was at a minimum and nothing was happening, Rowe drove down to Dapto for an 11 am appointment. Wild remarked:

Out of sheer conscientiousness he arrived at 8 am, switched on the gear and recorded the most magnificent outburst, which led to the discovery of first and second harmonics. Well, you couldn't write a paper without putting his name on it.

As he had with John Murray at Dapto, Wild always acknowledged chief electronics engineer Kevin Sheridan as the key figure in the facility's development: "Kevin and I became like Gilbert and Sullivan; we were both dependent on each other a great deal."

The Culgoora site later became the home for the Paul Wild Observatory, opened in 1988 and now a site for several major astronomical facilities.

Wild was always keen to pass on his enthusiasm for science. With George Gamow and instigator Harry Messel, he was a member of the inaugural trio who, from 1962, brought high-level science teaching to senior secondary students throughout Australia. Titled Summer School of Science, the sessions were televised live at the University of Sydney and re-broadcast in three-hour programs early every Sunday morning – a fore-runner of the programs of today's Professor Harry Messel International Science School.

== Researcher and administrator ==
In 1971, Paul Wild took over from E.G. 'Taffy' Bowen as chief of CSIRO's Division of Radiophysics. For someone who joined a particular research team so that he could "do his own thing", it may be surprising that he agreed to be appointed to this role. He explained his motivation:

Well all my life, scientific life, people have given me lots of resources and lots of opportunities and I think it's a matter of duty; when the finger is pointed to you it's your duty to pay back some of those wonderful things that have been given. That's how I became an administrator. [But] when I was Chief of Division I was not merely an administrator, because I also led a research group on the Interscan landing system.

That Interscan was an applied research group was no accident. In fact he had perceived a problem inherent in the Division of Radiophysics being solely involved in pure research – a situation that had never applied in CSIRO. He felt it was very important to "demonstrate to everyone that one could turn this technology into something useful."

== Interscan ==
In looking for applied research opportunities, Wild discovered that the Australian Department of Civil Aviation had been considering a call by the International Civil Aviation Organization for member states to propose a new system to replace the longstanding Instrument Landing System. He very quickly formed the concept of a microwave landing system and applied his energies to the project with great enthusiasm. The concept was simple: a radar fan beam scans back and forth horizontally while another scans up and down, giving the aircraft's position within a few inches.

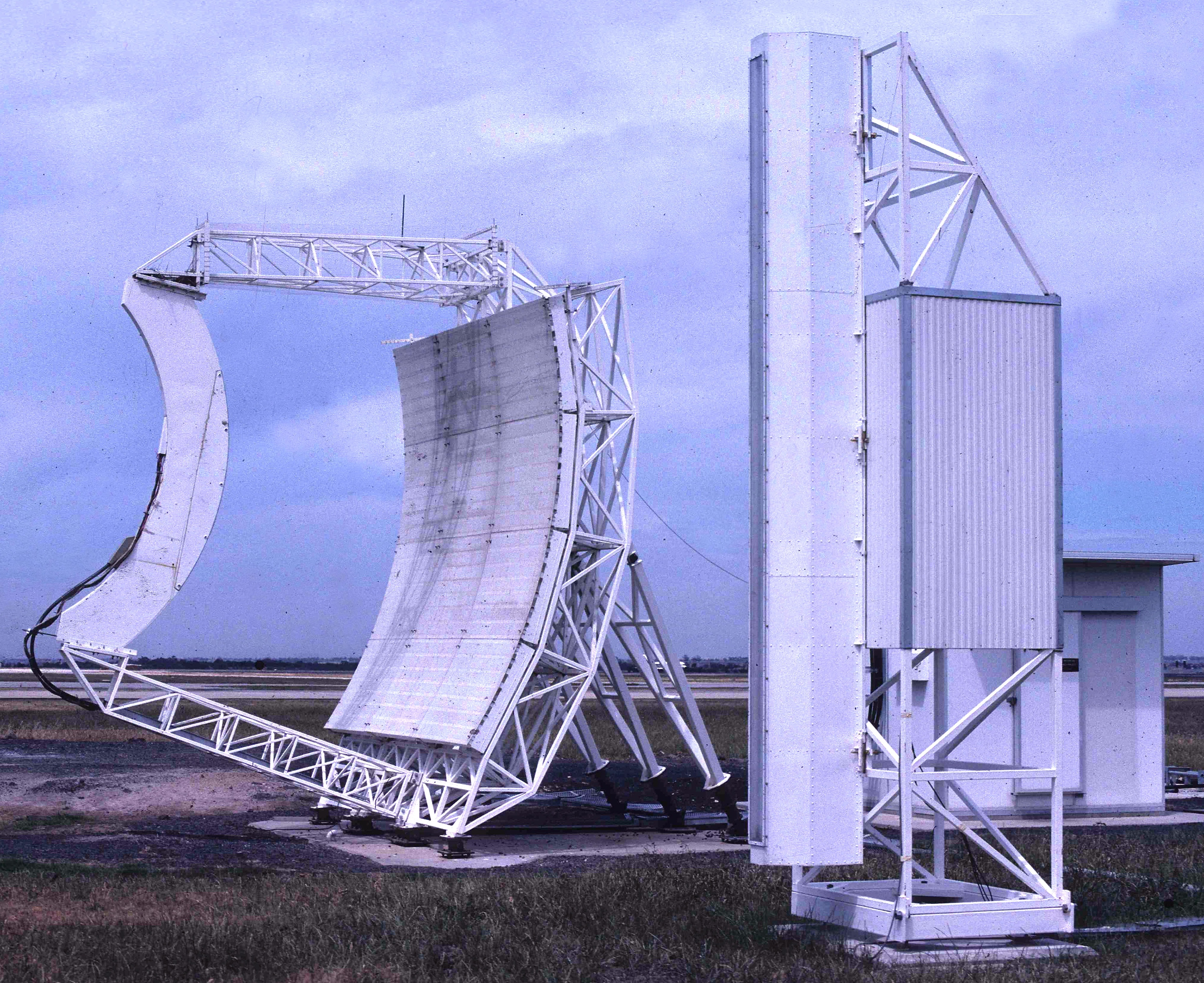
Components of the Interscan precision microwave landing system at Melbourne Airport.

Interscan proved to have many advantages over other precision landing systems. It allows a wide selection of channels to avoid interference with other nearby airports; has excellent performance in all weather; and gives freedom to locate antennae anywhere at an airport. Some installations became operational in the 1990s and more were set up subsequently in Europe. NASA has operated a similar system to land Space Shuttles. However, Interscan has not become widely deployed worldwide, largely because the US Federal Aviation Administration has developed the Wide Area Augmentation System (WAAS), which augments the satellite-based Global Positioning System (GPS). Although WAAS is cheaper and conforms to ILS Category I, its accuracy is under 1.0 metre laterally and under 1.5 metres vertically, which is a particular concern at locations that frequently suffer from low visibility.

In 1978, Interscan was accepted as the new global standard in microwave landing systems – but only after many international political hurdles had been overcome. The project involved long, delicate negotiations with the International Civil Aviation Organization and pragmatic alliances with other nations. It was during the ICAO negotiations, and as chief of his CSIRO division, that Wild was revealed as a highly talented diplomat and political strategist. Dennis Cooper, a key participant in the ICAO negotiations, described Wild as "an excellent mentor, happy to listen to the ideas of young colleagues, able to grasp complex ideas and explain them simply".

== National science leadership ==
In 1978, Wild became chairman of CSIRO, a position he held until 1985, and for part of that tenure was also its chief executive. He took on the role after the first Independent Inquiry into CSIRO (the Birch Report of 1977) pointed the organisation towards "filling a gap in national research with strategic mission-oriented work." He led the organisation through the restructure to modernise it and bring it closer to the industries and community that it serves.

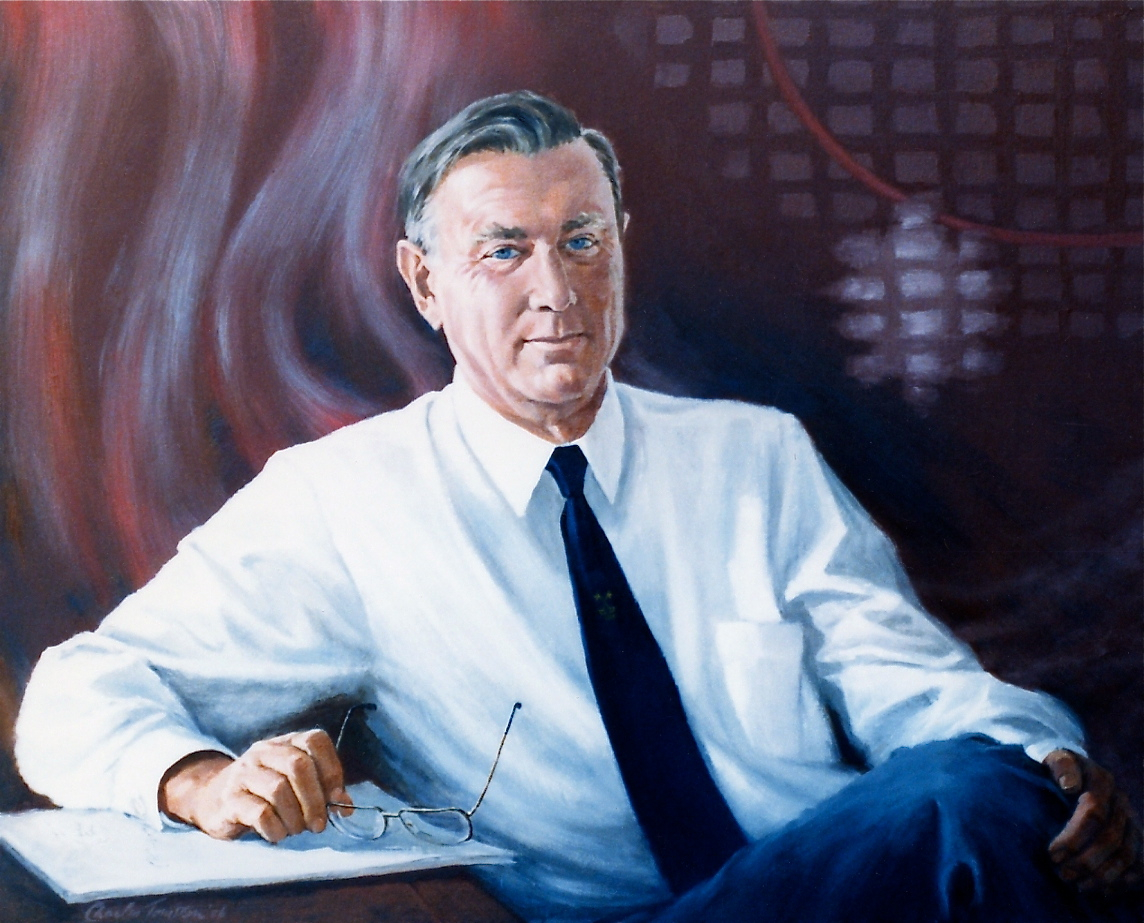
Dr Paul Wild: a portrait by Charles E. Tompson. Behind Dr Wild are images associated with his discoveries in radiophysics: the swirling shapes of solar winds on the left and, on the right, a cathode-ray oscilloscope image captured in his early research.

This role, especially, invoked a sense of duty that had its roots during and before Wild's naval service. When asked in 1992 whether his appointment as Chairman rested "to an extent on the fact that you had put the division, and Australia, on the international map and you had this capacity for applying very fundamental work?", he responded, "Yes, I think it certainly must have done. I don't know that I really wanted the job, but it was a duty to take the job when they offered it to you." Wild recognised that CSIRO needed to adapt and provide scientific and technological leadership in a changing world, reflecting his maxim that "without excellence and originality, research achieves nothing." During this period of great change he secured funding for major national research facilities, including the oceanographic research vessel, RV Franklin; the Australian Animal Health Laboratory and the Australia Telescope; and he established a new Division of Information Technology.

But many things did not involve smooth sailing: for example, as he put it, "I had terrible trouble over the Animal Health Laboratory when he [Wild's somewhat interventionist science minister, Barry Jones] wanted to close it all down, just when it was nearly finished being built." Further, CSIRO for the first time had to react to public criticism about its policies. Wild said "Before that time … I suppose CSIRO was a sacred cow, beyond criticism; and I think we had to get used to criticism and get used to defending."

He explained his particular ethos and style of management of CSIRO in this way:

Well, I suppose I always wanted to extrapolate from my own experience, small-scale experience, and some personal opinions. I had a strong desire always to see pure and applied research undertaken side by side in the same laboratory.... And I was still very much aware that the recognition that many – most, I should say – of the really important and fundamental discoveries in science which subsequently led to a massive technological development have come through curiosity-led research, and often through serendipity, which is terribly important. I think the Birch report was very helpful, and I agreed with his report that the whole core of the policy-making in the science that we were going to carry out was a matter of defining the right proportion of, shall we say, pure research, strategic mission-oriented, and technical research – and getting that proportion right.... I felt that fundamental research in the end was going to reap the real benefits in the long run ... discovering something like electricity ... was absolutely fundamental research and had an enormous impact on the world. On the other hand, there was the awareness that you're in charge of an organisation that's spending a million dollars of taxpayers' money every day, and that's a very sobering thought, so you had to keep the reins on as well. (Note: He gave an overview in an address to the National Press Club on 24 October 1984, covering CSIRO and its functions, history, benefits and role; the government and science; scientific research, including other countries' attitudes to it; and changes needed. See http://catalogue.nla.gov.au/Record/801419)

Indeed, there were many frustrations in being CSIRO's chairman at that time, of which he nominated as the worst "the frustration of finding it so difficult to bring in new young blood because of the descending budget in real terms."

The diplomacy and political strategy that Wild had first used to major advantage in negotiations with the International Civil Aviation Organization, combined with his intellectual rigour and a deeply ingrained focus on doing what was right, served CSIRO and Australia well until he retired from CSIRO, aged 62, in 1985.

== Very Fast Train Joint Venture ==
=== Inspiration, conceptualization and initial studies (1983-1987) ===
In October 1983, Wild made a trip from Canberra to a CSIRO meeting in Sydney using the XPT, which was introduced the year prior. He would remark that:

"despite the train's much publicized but very brief dash at 160 km/h, the journey, over all, had the leisurely features of a branch-line train. [...] In the end, the journey took 4 hours and 37 minutes – 20 minutes longer than scheduled, at an average speed of 70.6 km/h. I was absolutely appalled by the whole thing. After I flew home that night, I looked up an old reference book. I learned that if the train had completed the run in an even four hours – a schedule that was soon to be introduced – it would have traveled at the same average speed of 81.6 km/h as the London to Bristol Express in 1851."

In April 1984, he and several CSIRO senior staff members, and a senior engineering manager from BHP, met to discuss a concept paper. On the day before Good Friday, they agreed on the components and who would write them. They all had commitments and agreed it would take six weeks to put a draft together. However, such was their private enthusiasm that each of them worked right through the four-day break, virtually finishing their drafts. In July 1984 the completed work was published as A Proposal for a Fast Railway between Sydney, Canberra and Melbourne. It turned the high-speed train from a broad concept to a tangible proposal, remarkably predicting the main issues that would be involved in the development of an Australian high-speed railway.

From Sydney to Canberra much of the route was similar to that of the Hume Highway. From the national capital it proceeded south – paralleling the coast, generally about 70 kilometres inland – via Cooma and Bombala to Orbost; then west to Melbourne, very close to the coast. This route was chosen because it would provide better access for people in the coastal south-east of New South Wales and eastern Victoria, who were very poorly served by transport links. Further, it would encourage decentralisation more than a wholly inland route would, because about 80 per cent of Australians choose to live within 50 kilometres of the coast. Despite VFT curves being 20 times broader than on the existing Sydney–Melbourne railway, the proposed route was able to go around mountains rather than going through them. The direction of valleys was favourable for the most part, minimising the cost of tunnelling and substantial earthworks.

Wild's science minister, Barry Jones, enclosed a copy in a letter to the Prime Minister, observing that the concept would be very valuable in assisting decentralisation. The proposal would be sent to the federal Minister for Transport, Peter Morris, with comments reflecting his officials' opinion: it was not worth considering. Although Sydney–Melbourne was later identified as the fourth-busiest air route in the world (busier than any in North America, or any in Europe apart from Madrid to Barcelona) and the bureau had no firm data on transport markets in south-eastern Australia, its officials judged passenger fares would need to be set at a rate that would not be commercially viable. The bureau would not accept the French experience that the laws of physics (in which momentum is proportional to the square of the velocity) allowed much steeper gradients (hence much fewer cut-and-fill earthworks) than on low-speed railways. The difference in the estimation of earthworks was $2 billion – a significant proportion of the total cost of the project.

On 12 September 1984, during Parliament, Morris would describe the proposal as grandiose, likening it to another proposal to build a canal through the centre of Australia. He said that he would not "recommend to the Government that resources should be allocated to even do a study on it", and that "if, as has been suggested by its proponents [...] the private sector is interested in it, I would say to Dr Wild that he should take the proposal back to the private sector [...] and let them put it forward and fund it."

After meeting with Morris later in September, Wild opined that "in many areas Australia needed desperately to dig itself out of the stagnation of 19th century thought." He believed the reaction highlighted Australia's general malaise; he deplored the emphasis on the short term and the preference for patching up decaying and unprofitable systems, ignoring imaginative plans for the future. He called for a much larger, objective investigation by independent experts, including those from overseas countries which already had fast trains. In doing so he emphasised that he was not seeking government funding for the scheme – merely support for a $500,000 study that would last 12 months. He would later reflect that he had got into some trouble "saying that this knock-back was characteristic of the malaise which the country is suffering, which got into a headline."

However, there was to be a good outcome: soon afterwards Peter Abeles, head of transport giant TNT, telephoned him and said, "I think I can help you with a commercial solution to your problem." After that, Wild said, "Bit by bit, with his support, I got a joint venture together. And that's when we did the main part of the work."

Wild retired from CSIRO in October 1985, but CSIRO continued to support pre-feasibility studies until October 1988. By September 1986 he had brought together an unincorporated joint venture of TNT, Elders IXL and Kumagai Gumi. In August 1987, after delay caused by uncertainties surrounding a potential takeover of their company, the BHP joined as the fourth, and subsequently foremost, partner. Wild became chairman of the Very Fast Train Joint Venture.

=== Further studies (1987-1988) ===
In June 1987 the joint venture's pre-feasibility study was completed. It postulated that the project was technically feasible and financially viable. It envisaged a purpose-built high-speed line from Sydney to Canberra via Bowral and Goulburn, and either a coastal route from Canberra to Melbourne via Cooma, East Gippsland and the Latrobe Valley – or an inland route via Wagga Wagga, Albury-Wodonga, Wangaratta and Seymour. Later, routes to Brisbane and Adelaide were conceptualised.

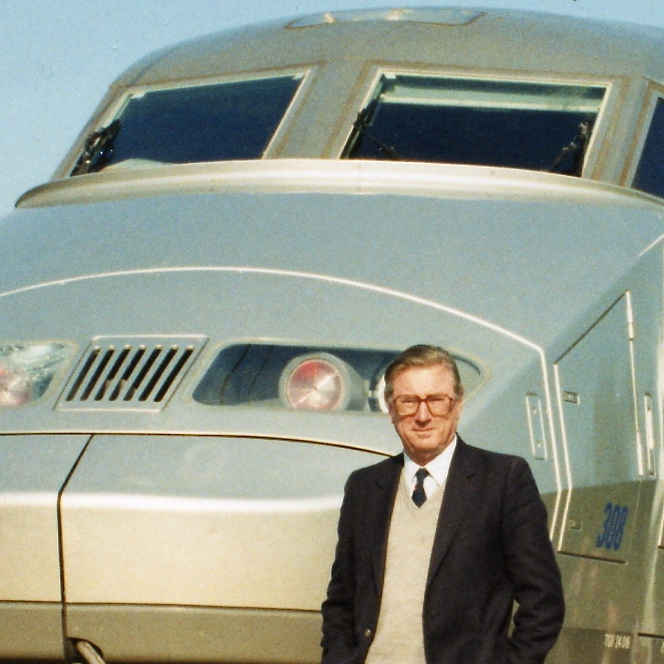
Paul Wild and a TGV in France in 1989. His vision of a high-speed railway for Australia was eventually thwarted by government inertia and what he had termed "the stagnation of 19th century thought".

In July–August 1988 a $1 million passenger market analysis was completed and a feasibility study was started, for which the joint venture partners budgeted $19 million. In December, a VFT Concept Report was released, identifying the key issues for a high-speed rail system, to be built and operated by private enterprise, with trains operating between Sydney, Canberra and Melbourne at speeds up to 350 km/h (220 mph). The report sought positive responses from the New South Wales, Victorian and federal governments and the Australian Capital Territory administration in facilitating access to land for survey and route investigation; ensuring cooperation by government agencies; and forms of support, including enactment of legislation to facilitate land acquisition.

The VFT project attracted widespread public and media interest. The latter was not always favorable, picking up on government scepticism about the project. Some public commentators spoke from a pre-ordained position. Although Wild had no doubts about the complexity of such an undertaking in an age of public consultation, he warned that the project would "end in a shambles if every professor and greenie had their say".

Overall public support for the project was very strong. A survey of Gippsland residents found it had 70% support. A Morgan research poll found 65% support for the project throughout Victoria and New South Wales. Another poll showed support throughout metropolitan and country areas of Victoria and New South Wales at 80%.

=== Issues and eventual scrapping (1990-1991) ===
In July 1990 the VFT joint venture announced comparative studies of market demand and capital costs on the coastal and the inland routes. In October 1990, Wild announced that the inland route was the preferred choice for the VFT. The decision not to proceed with the original route to the east of the Snowy Mountains and through Gippsland was a difficult one for the VFT Joint Venture and for Wild personally. The decision was based purely on the capital costs and predicted financial performance of the two routes: there was no interest from any government in the developmental benefits which the coastal route would have brought to the south-eastern area of Australia.

The decision earned the scorn of the original corporate supporter of the proposal, Sir Peter Abeles, a visionary who from the start had been attracted to the VFT's national development potential. Aware of the growth that fast trains overseas had generated along entire routes, he could not see the point of going inland, where few people wanted to live. His response to the decision was "You've lost the plot".

The project faced other problems. Internally, the views of the members of the joint venture were not always in alignment. As many people in business in Australia know, a joint venture is a less robust form of business enterprise than a company. (Note: Under Australia’s corporations legislation and governance practices deriving from it, directors of a company are required strictly to act in the interests of their company. Persons directing a joint venture, however, are not under the same obligation towards the joint venture.) Certainly there were many strains within the VFT Joint Venture, and they increased as the feasibility study progressed. Wild, referring in 1995 to when the project expanded under the joint venture said, "We then got in some professional management and I think things started to slide from then on". His role as chairman of the joint venture was not easy.

Externally, there was the continuing issue of dealing with four governments, i.e. the federal government; the state governments of New South Wales and Victoria; and following the recent granting of self-government to the national capital, the Australian Capital Territory government. They had differing agendas and a tendency to look for problems associated with the project rather than the opportunities it offered. This attitude led to the eventual insurmountable hurdle which the project faced, when the issue arose of the tax treatment which would be necessary for the project to proceed. The VFT team worked hard in 1990 and 1991 to devise an acceptable approach. Despite the economic benefits which had been identified in a third-party analysis the federal government was not prepared to move in the area of tax.

Wild retained a sense of bitterness about the federal government's short-sightedness that thwarted the project. He said:

The thing that lost the project in the end was that we were asking for some very reasonable taxation arrangements which would apply in the early days of very heavy spending – in the long run we would be paying more taxes but we just wanted to ease the taxes during that early time – and that was knocked back by the government, in fact by the treasurer ... Paul Keating, and I would say that he is the man responsible for stopping [the] project."

In August 1991 the federal government gave its final, negative answer and the joint venture ceased work on the project. Ironically, the federal government soon introduced infrastructure bonds to assist major projects facing the same financial hurdles as the VFT. However, Australian governments have continued to struggle to find acceptable mechanisms for public–private partnerships undertaking infrastructure projects.

Wild also concluded there were internal factors that in hindsight could be seen to have hampered the project: he believed the chosen corporate structure of a joint venture lacked the governance strengths and focus of a company; too many project delays had occurred; and it would have been better to buy TGVs "off the shelf" than to proceed, as they had, with a train that was to be designed and built in Australia.

== Latter years ==
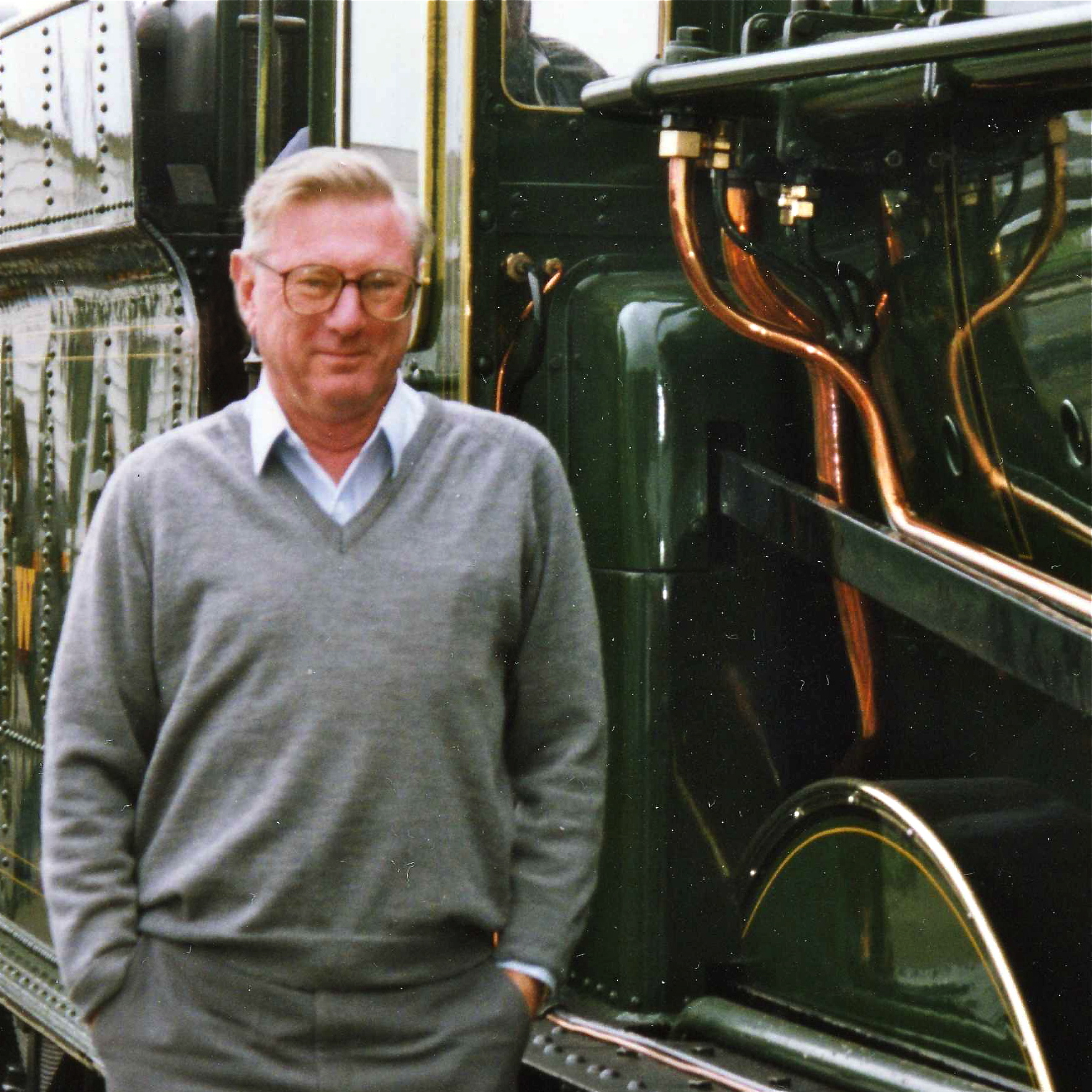
At seven, Paul Wild wanted "to be an engine driver to drive one of the King class locomotives from Paddington to the West Country". In 1985 he stands by restored steam locomotive King Edward I.

In 1991 Wild's wife of 43 years, Elaine, died. Soon after the VFT project ended, he went for a holiday in the US and took with him the address of an old colleague in radiophysics – only to find that he had recently died. A few months later he proposed to his colleague's widow, Margaret Lyndon, and they had 12 happy years together before she died. During this time they alternated between Ann Arbor and Canberra.

When in the US Paul Wild spent hours with Margaret's son, Tom Haddock, also a research scientist, discussing general relativity, the origin of inertia, the clever way the Soviet scientists Landau and Lifshitz developed their arguments on field theory, and then-current experiments such as the Gravity Probe B satellite to detect the general relativistic Lense-Thirring frame-dragging effect from the Earth's spin. The origin of inertia was a special interest Wild had, which they discussed at great length. Haddock reflected, "Physics went well beyond being Paul's profession; it was his hobby as well."

The two also worked together on a paper in gravitational theory, 'Evaluation of the Cosmic Density Parameter, Omega', concerning the component of omega due to mass. The purely theoretically derived result was based solely on an equation of general relativity, given by Einstein, relating inertial and gravitational mass – independent of the values of the gravitational constant and the Hubble constant. The paper reflected the strong, creative interest Wild had in gravitation, relativity and cosmology right to the end.

That is not surprising. In a 1995 interview Wild nominated his most significant achievement to be the building of the Culgoora radio-heliograph and providing the world with a unique eye to view and record moving pictures of rapidly changing solar activity. He observed:

most scientific discoveries, had they not been made by the originator, would have been made by somebody else within a year or so or even less. To my mind the most significant discoveries or projects are those which would have eluded other researchers for decades or more. … The [Culgoora radio-heliograph] revealed a whole range of previously unknown phenomena at a wavelength millions of times longer than the wavelength of all other moving pictures ever taken of the sun. Today, nearly three decades later, the instrument has not been duplicated and the results remain unique. In saying this I do not want to give the impression that I did it all by myself. I owe much to CSIRO and the Ford Foundation for providing the resources and to a wonderful bunch of colleagues who built it and made it all work.

Paul Wild was a knowledgeable classical music lover, enjoying Beethoven in particular; an expert at The Times crossword puzzles, chess and bridge; a railway enthusiast; a social cricketer and a "walking encyclopaedia of cricket knowledge". Although in his consummate professionalism he had an inherent dignity, not far from the surface there was always an innate sense of fun. His interviewer for the National Library of Australia oral history project, Ann Moyal, referred to "his story, with its humorous shafts".

Wild's humour also came through in the occasional light-hearted impersonation. It was evident from early days, such as in the Pacific, when the officers of HMS King George V entertained some American admirals and their staffs. It was, he related,

a very considerable gathering of gold braid. The British ships, of course, were very popular because they were wet and the Americans' were dry (Note: "Wet" referred to the fact of alcohol being allowed to be consumed at sea on British ships, albeit under prescribed conditions; "dry" to alcohol consumption being prohibited on board US vessels.), and so they were all having a marvellous time when the captain grabbed hold of me. I had one talent in those days, in the amusement line, and that was to give a convincing imitation of the Führer and of Winston Churchill. And the captain grabbed me and said he wanted me to address them as Hitler. And so somebody got a burnt cork and produced the moustache and a comb on the hair, and there they were assembled before me, all this mass of gold braid. And I gave them several minutes of harangue in mock-German, and eventually I finished and a great roar went up with a mass of hands going up at forty-five degrees baying "Sieg, heil!, Sieg, heil!" over and over again, and it's the mass of gold braid on these arms that lives in my memory.

Wild engendered intense loyalties among the people he knew. His formative naval service gave him a strong sense of teamwork and obligation to others, and to seeking the fairest way ahead. His CSIRO successor spoke of "his generosity in sharing ideas", that he was "extremely approachable", with "the magical ability to reduce the most complex of concepts to simple terms understood by all"; and when these concepts "were realised in practice he never failed to acknowledge the role [his colleagues] played in developing them."

Paul Wild died of natural causes in Canberra on 10 May 2008.

== Honours ==
Paul Wild received the following honours for his research and science leadership:

- Edgeworth David Medal, Royal Society of New South Wales (1957)
- Member, American Academy of Arts and Sciences (1961)
- Member, American Philosophical Society (1962)
- Fellow, Australian Academy of Science (1964)
- Inaugural Arctowski Medal, United States National Academy of Sciences (1969)
- Balthasar van der Pol Gold Medal, International Union of Radio Science (1969)
- Fellow of the Royal Society (1970)
- Inaugural Herschel Medal, Royal Astronomical Society (1974)
- Matthew Flinders Medal and Lecture, Australian Academy of Science (1974)
- Thomas Ranken Lyle Medal, Australian Academy of Science (1975)
- Fellow, Australian Academy of Technological Sciences and Engineering 1977
- Commander of the Order of the British Empire (CBE) (1978)
- Royal Archive winner, The Royal Society (1980)
- George Ellery Hale Prize for Solar Astronomy, American Astronomical Society (1980)
- ANZAAS Medal, Australian and New Zealand Association for the Advancement of Science (1984)
- Companion of the Order of Australia (AC) (1986)
- Hartnett Medal, Royal Society of Arts London (1988)
- Centenary Medal (2001)

== Memorial ==
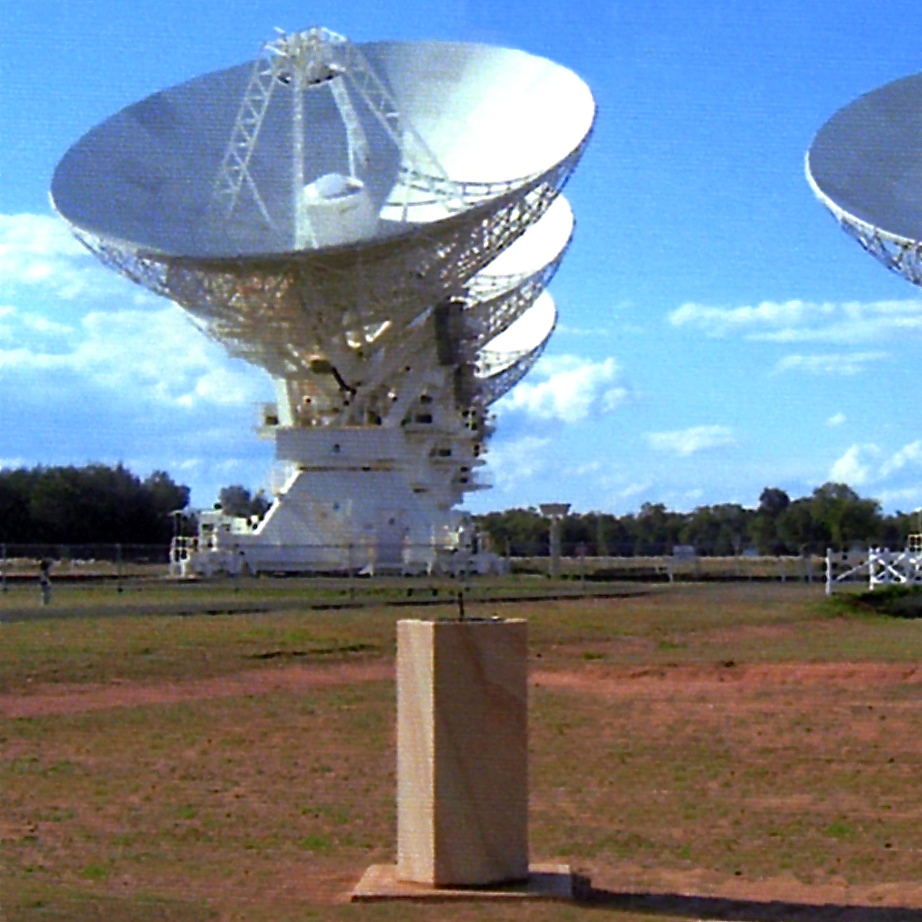
A sundial commemorates Paul Wild near antennae of the Australia Telescope Compact Array.

At Culgoora, New South Wales (25 kilometres from Narrabri), in the grounds of the Paul Wild Observatory – home to the Australia Telescope Compact Array – is a sundial, mounted on a pedestal, "In memory of Paul Wild, founder of this observatory".

== Select bibliography ==
- Bhathal, Ragbir (1996). Australian astronomers: achievements at the frontiers of astronomy. Canberra: National Library of Australia. p. 236. ISBN 0642106665.
- Budd, Dale (21 June 2008). "A fast railway between Sydney, Canberra and Melbourne". Proceedings of the Paul Wild Commemorative Seminar. Canberra: Australian Academy of Science.
- Moyal, Ann (1994). Portraits in science. Canberra: National Library of Australia. p. 203. ISBN 0642106169.
- Stewart, Ronald Thomas (2009). The contribution of the CSIRO Division of Radiophysics Penrith and Dapto Field Stations to international radio astronomy (PhD). Townsville: James Cook University. p. 301.
- Wild, John Paul (December 1992). "Paul Wild interviewed by Ann Moyal in the Australian astronomers oral history project" (Interview). Libraries Australia ID 9722666 (available as sound recording or 36-page transcript). Interviewed by Ann Moyal. Canberra: National Library of Australia.
- Wild, John Paul (7 February 1995). "Paul Wild interviewed by Ragbir Bhathal for the Australian astronomers oral history project" (Interview). Libraries Australia ID 11386432 (available as sound recording or 49-page transcript). Interviewed by Ragbir Bhathal. Canberra: National Library of Australia.

== See also ==
- Wild's Triplet
