= Very Fast Train Joint Venture =

Proposed high-speed railway in Australia

Very Fast Train

Overview
- Status: Cancelled
- Locale: New South Wales; Australian Capital Territory; Victoria
- Termini: Sydney; Melbourne
- Stations: Sydney Central, Sydney Airport, Campbelltown, Bowral, Goulburn, Canberra, Yass, Wagga Wagga, Albury-Wodonga, Benalla, Seymour, Melbourne Airport, Melbourne Spencer Street

Service
- Type: High-speed rail

Technical
- Line length: 854 km (531 mi)
- Number of tracks: 2
- Track gauge: 1,435 mm (4 ft 8 1/2 in)
- Minimum radius: 7,000 metres (23,000 ft)
- Operating speed: 350 km/h (220 mph)

The Very Fast Train (VFT) was a proposed high-speed railway between Sydney, Canberra and Melbourne in south-eastern Australia. Initially conceived by Dr Paul Wild of the CSIRO in 1984, the proposal was adopted by a private-sector joint venture in 1987, comprising Elders IXL, Kumagai Gumi, TNT and BHP. Several major studies were undertaken in the 1980s and early 1990s, which showed the proposal to be both technically and financially feasible.

The VFT attracted widespread support from both the general public and sections of government, but the joint venture folded following the failure to secure a favourable taxation agreement with the federal government in late 1991. Other reasons for the scheme's failure were speculated to include a difficult relationship between joint venture members, the deregulation of the Australian airline market, environmental and noise pollution concerns, accusations that the scheme was in fact a disguised land development project, and a lack of planning support from Federal and state governments.

The Very Fast Train remains the most substantial investment into a high-speed rail project in Australia, and the only proposal to involve 100% private funding. Although there have been numerous subsequent studies into high-speed rail since the VFT, none have come as close to realisation. Several of the joint venture members went on to propose additional fast-rail projects during the 1990s, but none passed beyond the planning stage. The name "Very Fast Train" or "VFT" has become a synonym for high-speed rail in Australia, though no subsequent proposal has adopted the terminology.

== Origins ==
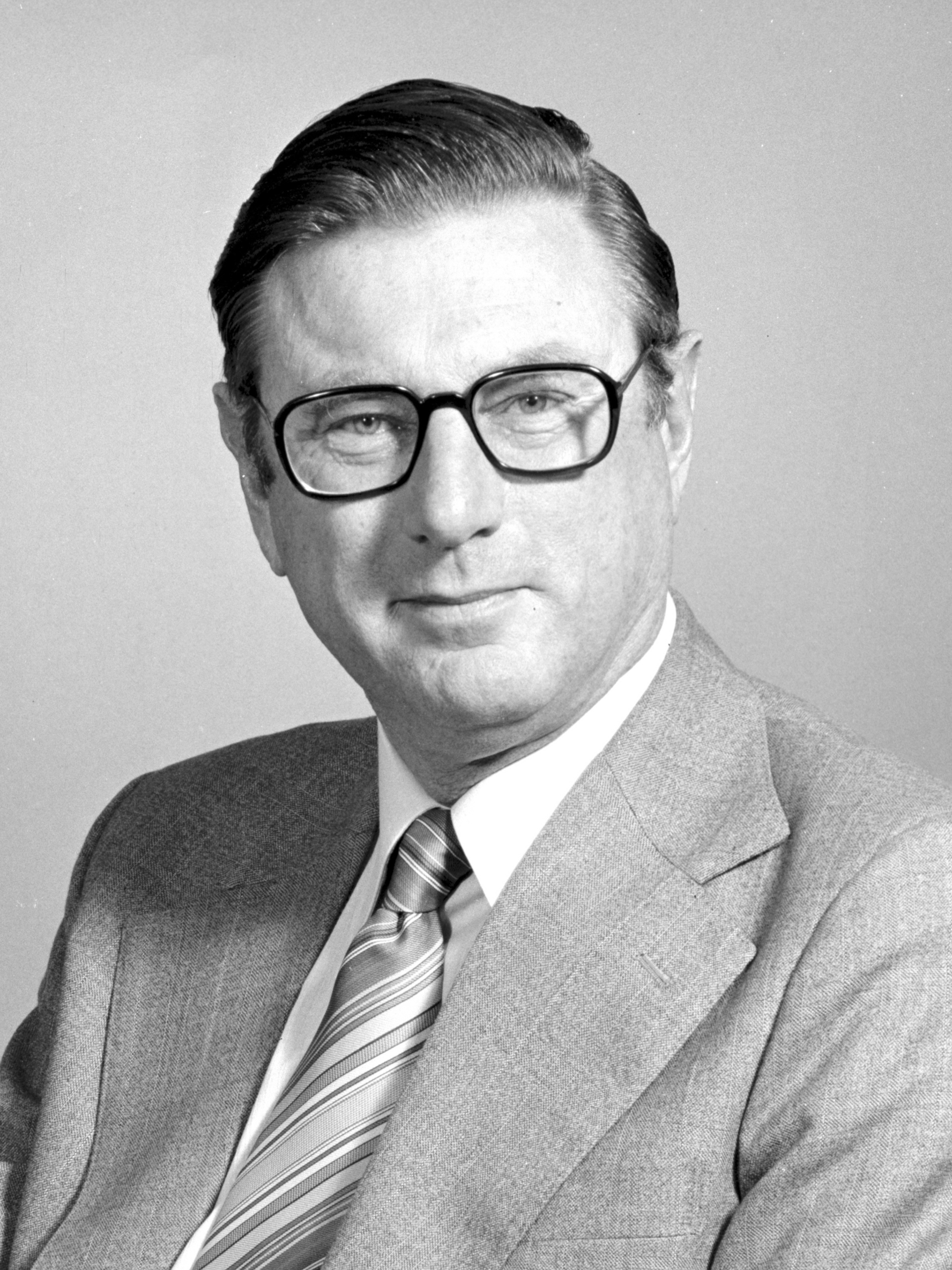
Dr Paul Wild was the first to seriously propose an Australian high-speed railway.

An Australian high-speed railway was originally conceived by Dr Paul Wild of the CSIRO in the early 1980s. A lifelong train enthusiast, Dr Wild was excited about the highly anticipated introduction of the new XPT rollingstock to the Sydney-Canberra line. An Australian variant of British Rail's InterCity 125 High Speed Train, the XPT promised a "new rail travel experience". In October 1983, Dr Wild booked a ticket on the first run of the new service from his base in Canberra to a meeting in Sydney. Wild found the XPT disappointing, offering only mild improvements on the existing service. The train only briefly reached its top speed of 160 km/h, was not an express service, and the archaic staff-change at Goulburn was undertaken with "a complete lack of urgency." Dr Wild described the service as having "the leisurely features of a branch-line train". In the end, the service took 4 hours 37 minutes, a dismal 20 minutes longer than scheduled. The average speed of 70.6 kilometres per hour (43.9 mph) was slower than many trains of the steam era.

Disappointed with this state of affairs, Dr Wild wrote to the chief executive of the NSW State Rail Authority, David Hill, offering the services of the CSIRO for a project to help the trains run faster; he was initially thinking of something like three hours between Sydney and Canberra, a moderate speed upgrade that would make the train competitive with cars and coaches. Despite a cordial meeting between the CSIRO and the State Rail Authority on 29 February 1984, it was clear that the authority considered faster speeds for regional rail a low priority.

Nevertheless, Dr Wild was convinced the idea was sound, and continued to explore the possibilities of a fast Sydney-Canberra-Melbourne service in his own time. Initially aiming to achieve a six-hour service from Sydney to Melbourne, he eventually decided that the goal must be three hours, a travel time that would be competitive with air travel. Although this would require a top speed of 350 km/h, substantially faster than the 270 km/h TGV (the world's then-fastest commercial service), high-speed rail technology was progressing at such a pace to make this a plausible near-term objective. Dr Wild's preliminary analysis indicated that the most favourable route would be via Cooma, Orbost and the Gippsland region; he bought a set of "about two dozen" 1:100,000 survey maps, tracing out the 7-km radius curves that such speeds would necessitate with 14 cm-diameter dinner plates on his living room floor.

When he showed this preliminary route to his colleagues, they were excited by Wild's ideas. At a meeting on 19 April 1984 it was agreed to write a report. Dr Wild would write on the broad concept; John Brotchie on the economics and market; and John Nicholson on the technology. Although they had agreed to have drafts ready within six weeks, such was their private enthusiasm that they had each completed a draft within four days.

Their report, A Proposal for a Fast Railway between Sydney, Canberra and Melbourne, was published by the CSIRO three months later on 26 July 1984. The projected cost was $2.5 billion ($7.2 billion in 2014). The proposed benefits of the railway included increased regional development, relieving congestion of Sydney Airport, reducing reliance on imported fossil fuels, and tourism to the Snowy Mountains and Gippsland regions; the report suggested that the high-speed line could be called the Snowy Mountains Express.

The CSIRO later requested funding to undertake a detailed study, estimated to take 12 months and cost $500,000. Although Prime Minister Bob Hawke observed that a fast railway would be very valuable to the Labor government's policy of decentralisation, the bureaucracy was sceptical of the cost assumptions given in the CSIRO's report, particularly earthworks, which they estimated to cost $2.8 billion against the CSIRO's estimate of $800 million (this was due to an assumption, not shared by the government analysis, that high speed trains could withstand short sections of steeper grade than conventional trains). On 12 September 1984, the Minister for Transport Peter Morris rejected the proposal, stating in the House of Representatives that he would not recommend "that resources should be allocated to even do a study on it." As a parting shot, Morris said that "if, as has been suggested by its proponents ... the private sector is interested in it, I would say to Dr Wild that he should take the proposal back to the private sector ... and let them put it forward and fund it."

== The joint venture is formed ==
Morris' dismissive suggestion to find private backing for the project was quick to become an unexpected reality. About a week after the Hawke Government's decisive rejection of the fast railway proposal, Dr Wild received a phone call from the head of transport giant TNT, Sir Peter Abeles, who began: "I think I can help you with a commercial solution to your problem." Abeles outlined an ambitious plan to transform Australia's state-owned railways into private, profit-making enterprises. He believed that the establishment of a fast railway would additionally facilitate regional development outside the major cities, particularly the south-east of the continent which was then – and remains – poorly served by transportation links.

It took nearly two years to find sufficient corporate support for the estimated $600,000 pre-feasibility study. A prospectus entitled Sydney to Melbourne in 3 hours was prepared by Dale Budd, a Canberra-based management consultant and fellow rail-enthusiast, in which the name "Very Fast Train" was first proposed (a loose translation of the French Train à Grande Vitesse). Kumagai Gumi joined in December 1985, and Elders IXL in March 1986, each with the required pledge of $200,000. An office was set up in Canberra, and the first meeting of the Very Fast Train Joint Venture took place on 2 June 1986, with two delegates from each of the members, plus Dr Wild as chairman.

Events moved quickly; with the help of a team of international consultants (most of whom provided their services below cost), the pre-feasibility study was completed in June 1987, and showed that the VFT would be both technically and financially viable. In August, the joint venture received a substantial boost with BHP joining as a fourth partner, bringing their experience with the construction of heavy industrial rail. BHP had previously been approached by Dr Wild for construction estimates during the preparation of the original CSIRO report; the concept had intrigued several managers, and BHP had subsequently performed some additional investigations of their own. It was on the strength of these inquiries, and the positive findings of the pre-feasibility study, that led BHP to join. Dr Wild was extremely pleased with the outcome, describing it as "a well-balanced consortium".

== Major studies ==
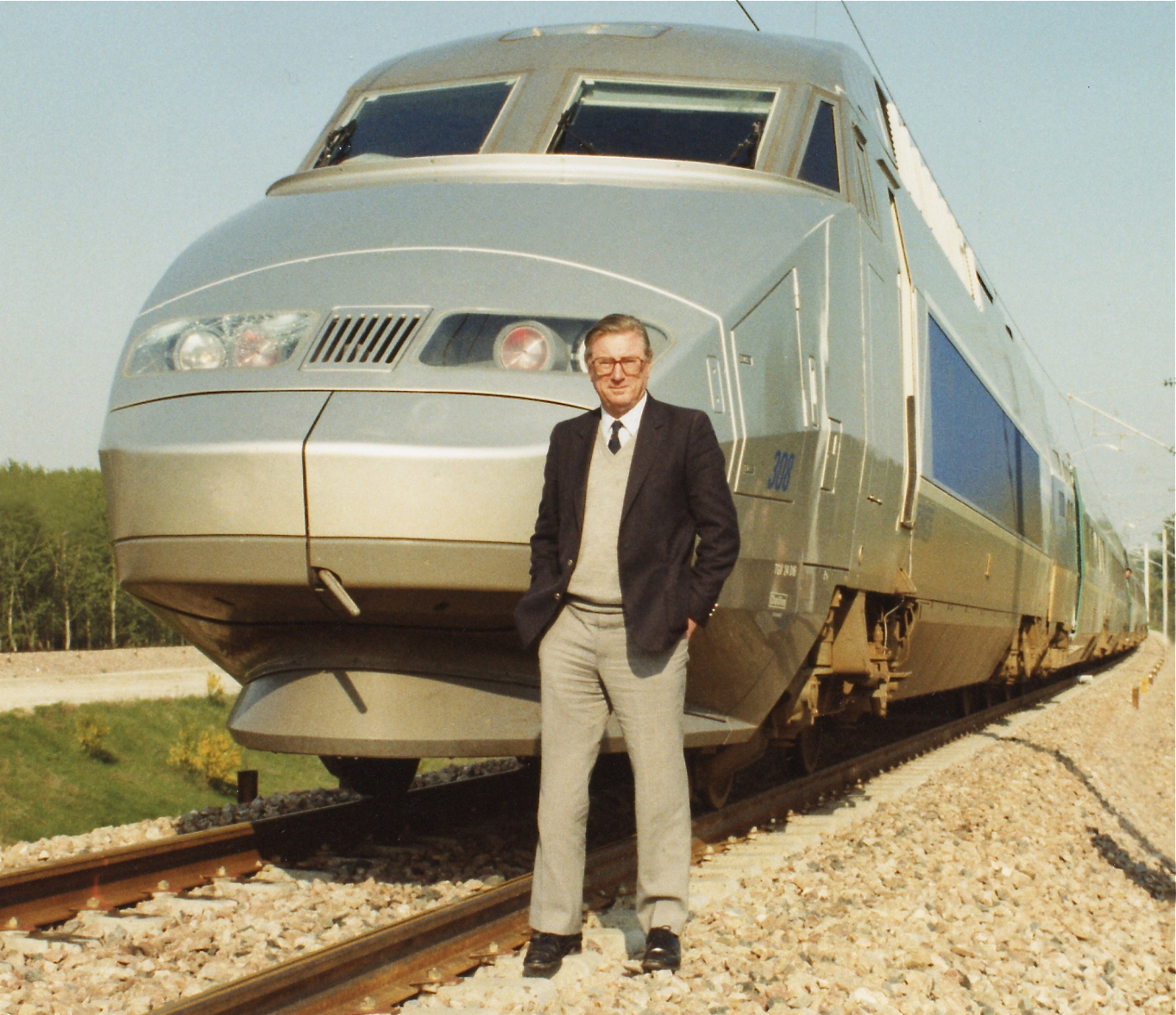
Paul Wild standing in front of a TGV in France, 1989

In September 1987, due to the lack of sufficiently detailed data on the east coast passenger market, the joint venture commissioned a detailed market study at a cost of $1 million. This study estimated the annual demand for the VFT to exceed 6.6 million trips (Sydney-Melbourne equivalent); later studies upgraded this estimate to 8.2 million.

In September 1988, the joint venture members were sufficiently confident in the initial findings that they voted to commit funding to a full-blown feasibility study, to take 2 1/2 years and cost $18.6 million (equivalent to $33.5 million in 2013). This substantial injection of private capital led to the CSIRO ceasing involvement later that month, and marked the beginning of the VFT as a fully private operation.

In August 1989, the Government issued a statement of support to the VFT project, against the advice of eight Federal departments which had advised against taking a definite position due to uncertainties remaining after the release of the joint venture's concept report, which they declared "inadequate." Only the Department of Industry recommended supporting the proposal outright. Prime Minister Bob Hawke called the VFT "the most important development project since World War II."

A report entitled The Economics of the Very Fast Train was released in October 1990. Prepared by the well respected Canberra consultancy Access Economics, the report claimed a net-benefit to the economy of 12 billion 1990 dollars, with the major benefits being reduced atmospheric pollution, lower road maintenance, and reduced congestion at Sydney Airport. It was hailed by the VFT's supporters as an embarrassment to Treasury, who had opposed supporting the proposed tax breaks.

== Competing proposals ==
=== Fast Freight Train ===
In October 1988, the Victorian Minister for Transport proposed a "Fast Freight Train". It was partly a response to the VFT proposal, which would not have been suitable for the carriage of freight due to the steeper grades proposed. The FFT proposed a major upgrade of the existing alignment between Sydney and Melbourne, comprising several bridge replacements and minor deviations between Albury and Melbourne, and much more extensive works between Moss Vale and Junee. The proposed alignment would allow freight trains to travel at a top speed of 115 km/h for most of the route, with no speed restrictions for curves or hills.

In response, the joint venture expanded the scope of the Project Evaluation to encompass an investigation into using the VFT alignment for dedicated freight trains.

=== Tilting trains ===
In January 1990 it was reported that the NSW Government was considering upgrading the existing state railway lines to use tilting train technology under development by UK engineering giant ASEA Brown Boveri. Although at 200 km/h they would be somewhat slower than the VFT, the tilt trains would avoid the need for a completely new rail corridor. There was concern that two fast railways could end up being built, which would then both be financially unviable. The VFT joint venture argued that the proposed upgrades would cost the state $1.45 billion and provide 1,700 seats daily between Sydney and Melbourne, while the VFT would cost the state nothing (the estimated $4.5 billion cost was to be privately funded) while providing 16,000 seats.

The VFT joint venture considered the potential of tilting trains in its own study but dismissed them, suggesting that the achievable speed increases are often overstated. Without major works to ease curve radii and increase cant on the existing rail alignment, the joint venture concluded that tilting trains could offer, at best, an 8-hour service between Sydney and Melbourne, which they deemed would not be competitive with air travel.

=== Magnetic levitation ===
Although the joint venture considered magnetic levitation technology, they decided to proceed with conventional "steel wheel steel rail" technology due to the fact that there were no operational or near-term commercial systems, and projections that the capital cost could be up to four times as much as conventional high speed rail.

== Study completion ==
Typical section for the proposed railway.

The results of the feasibility study were released in November 1990, in a report simply titled "VFT – Project Evaluation" It proposed an 854-kilometre (531 mi) inland route (108 km shorter than the existing railway), 1435mm gauge, with 7 km minimum horizontal radius and maximum grade 3.5%. Construction was slated to begin in 1992, taking five years and costing $6.56 billion ($11.82 billion in 2013 dollars).

The proposed service would have 30 trains per day in each direction, with the non-stop service offering travel times of one hour from Sydney to Canberra, and two hours from Canberra to Melbourne. Additional stations would be located at Sydney Airport, Campbelltown, Bowral, Goulburn, Yass, Wagga Wagga, Albury-Wodonga, Benalla, Seymour and Melbourne Airport. Fares were estimated at $130 for Sydney to Melbourne, $100 for Canberra to Melbourne and $60 for Sydney to Canberra ($234, $180 and $108 respectively in 2013 dollars), then representing between 53% and 64% of a typical full economy airfare on the same route. Passenger demand was estimated at 6.9 million trips (Sydney to Melbourne) per annum.

=== Cost breakdown ===
Component	Cost ($m 1990 AUD)	Percentage
Land	306	4.7%
Route and facilities	3785	57.7%
Trackwork	765	11.7%
Power supply and OHLE	459	7.0%
Control and communication	318	4.8%
Rolling stock	930	14.2%
Total	6563	100%

=== Alignment ===
Numerous different alignments were studied, including variations of both the coastal route and the inland route.

Variations of the coastal route focused on three different alignments between Cooma and Bairnsdale through either the Brodribb, Cann, or Snowy River Valleys.

Options considered for the inland route included several variations of the eastern Riverina route through Albury and Benalla (similar to that identified in the original pre-feasibility study), a route through Deniliquin and Bendigo, a diversion to Shepparton, two options that would allow a station at Tumut, and one option that passed directly under the Snowy Mountains to Bredbo via a 72 km tunnel. Most of these routes were abandoned in early stages of investigation due to excessive construction costs or low projected passenger demand.

The final decision to adopt an inland route substantially similar to the pre-feasibility route was influenced by the much higher engineering costs associated with the coastal route. Although the coastal route would have had higher passenger demand due to both density of development and tourism potential, these benefits were found to be not nearly sufficient to compensate for the higher capital costs.

==== Sydney to Glenfield ====
The VFT was proposed to start from a new terminus alongside Sydney Central station proceeding to Sydney Airport via a tunnel emerging alongside the East Hills line at Turrella from where new tracks would be built on either side of the existing line to Glenfield.

==== Glenfield to Canberra ====
From Glenfield through to a point 15 kilometres north of Mittagong, it would cross the Hume Highway several times before following it to south of Goulburn from where it would pass to the west of Lake George.

Particular attention was given to the proposed housing developments in the Glenfield/Campbelltown area, with the report urging the government to ensure any land releases reserved a corridor for future development of the high-speed alignment.

==== Canberra to Tullamarine ====
The Canberra station was to be built in the northern suburb of Gungahlin. Although this is some 10 km distant from Canberra's CBD, it would have good road access to all parts of the city, as well as Canberra Airport. It would have left Canberra via a new corridor parallel to the Barton Highway to Yass and Wagga Wagga.

It then would have headed west of the Bulloc Bulloc Range close to Henty, Culcairn and Walla Walla then crossing the Murray River near Howlong before passing through Chiltern, Rutherglen and Wangaratta. It would then run parallel to the existing North East line through Benalla to Mangalore passing west of Kilmore before rejoining the existing line at Seymour.

==== Tullamarine to Melbourne ====
The route passed close to Melbourne Airport, and possibilities for a link were "being investigated". It would then proceed through the northern suburbs of Melbourne on a new alignment via Somerton, Broadmeadows, Oak Park, Strathmore, Moonee Ponds and Ascot Vale before joining the existing the Broadmeadows line to terminate at Spencer Street station.

=== Additional links ===
The Project Evaluation also foreshadowed the possibility of links to Badgerys Creek, Brisbane and Adelaide. The Badgerys Creek spur was planned to divert from the main line at Glenfield, and serve the proposed Second Sydney Airport.

A brief analysis of a link to Brisbane, initially proposed in a 1989 paper prepared at the request of the Queensland Government and designated "VFT-N," was included in the 1990 Project Evaluation. It would include stations at Newcastle, Taree, Coffs Harbour and the Gold Coast. Preliminary investigations identified a route 797 km long, with a non-stop travel time of 2.5hours. Capital costs were slightly lower than the Sydney link due to the shorter length and mostly easier terrain. A new commuter rail station tentatively named "Warringah" was proposed to be located near Frenchs Forest and integrated with the suburban rail network. Southbound VFT-N services would terminate at Sydney Airport, and northbound VFT services would terminate at Warringah, thus avoiding the need to redevelop the congested sidings at Central for turnaround and stabling facilities; it would also increase convenience for passengers by providing several destinations within Sydney.

Although substantive studies were never undertaken, the joint venture also considered a link from Melbourne to Adelaide ("VFT-S"), branching from the mainline at Seymour and taking an estimated 2 hours 20 minutes. By sharing the same access corridor through Melbourne's suburbs, its capital cost would be far lower than the other links. With the shorter travel time, the potential market was estimated at two-thirds that of Sydney-Melbourne, despite Adelaide's lower population; the consortium reported the VFT-S was both "possible and viable".

== Opposition ==
In May 1990, an interim report tabled in the senate raised doubts about the VFT's construction and operating costs, fare schedule, passenger demand and environmental impact. The report, which included 386 public submissions, claimed that comparisons with fast rail services in France or Japan were misleading, as both countries have far higher population densities than Australia, as well as higher motoring costs. Additionally, it was noted that the French and Japanese systems still require government assistance despite these advantages.

=== Real estate development ===
In October 1989, following the release of a major progress report entitled VFT: Focus for the future, it was noted that the joint venture appeared to be admitting that the VFT project would not in fact be financially attractive as a passenger service alone. According to economist Peter Swan of the University of New South Wales, the Progress Report seemed to indicate that the project's financial viability hinged on a massive land-development program in the vicinity of new stations along the route, in turn made possible by large-scale governmental compulsory-acquisition orders and development approvals.

In a document entitled Sharing value added to property on the VFT corridor, the consortium suggested that part of the cost of the VFT could be offset by the government levying a capital gains style tax on property within the development corridor; the resulting backlash from farmers and other landowners caused the consortium to quickly back away from the suggestion. Similarly, some opponents of the VFT seized on a remark by Abeles that "land value capture" could be used to fund the project through its difficult early years, and began to publicly suggest that the VFT was in fact a "disguised real-estate project" rather than a genuine desire to provide a transport service.

=== Noise ===
One of the main concerns centred around the noise levels expected from the new trains, which environmentalists said would be "equivalent to a continuous stream of jets taking off", and would be heard five kilometres away. This is likely an exaggeration (see Examples of sound pressure), although the 1989 progress report indicated that NSW planning limitations for peak noise of 80dBA would only be met at a distance of 150m from the line. The joint venture's solution to this was to plan for the line to pass no closer than 200m to existing dwellings without noise abatement measures. Some raised concerns that this would severely restrict future development along the noise corridor. Public opposition also led the joint venture to promise that the VFT would be restricted to 80 km/h on the part of the alignment passing through the Wolli Creek Valley residential area; if additional speed restrictions were demanded in other residential areas, travel times would begin to be severely affected, damaging the project's profitability.

=== Environmental impact ===
In the early years of the proposal, a coastal corridor was favoured which would have necessitated a new rail alignment through the relatively pristine eucalyptus forests of East Gippsland. Aside from the direct impact of clearing, earthworks and construction for the new line, concerns were raised by environmentalists about the potential for the VFT to disrupt natural fauna migration corridors. The Australian Greens warned that the VFT had the potential to become the greatest environmental conflict in the history of Victoria and New South Wales, while the Australian Conservation Foundation suggested the selection of a Gippsland corridor could lead to the extinction of the long-footed potoroo.

Eventually, detailed corridor analysis determined that although the coastal corridor had higher projected earnings, the inland corridor had a higher net present value due to substantially lower construction costs. As a result, the joint venture changed their preferred corridor from the coastal to the inland option in 1990. Nevertheless, a perception that the VFT would damage sensitive environmental areas remained.

=== Tax concessions ===
In August 1990, it was reported that the joint venture was seeking tax concessions from the government, on the grounds that other privately owned transport providers (e.g., airlines and buses) are not expected to pay directly for necessary infrastructure such as airports and freeways. The nature of the concessions sought would not reduce the overall tax burden, but merely delay it from the construction period to the operational stage when the new railway was earning revenue. The consortium had always argued that they would never request financial assistance from the taxpayer, and continued to argue that the changes they sought did not constitute this; rather, it was "levelling the playing field" – allowing the VFT, and other similar projects, to have access to the same tax-deduction benefits that other business ventures with shorter lead times already enjoyed.

Treasury was vehemently opposed to the idea of tax concessions, which they estimated would cost the government $1.4 billion in reduced tax receipts (the joint venture estimated the concessions at closer to $550 million). Treasurer Paul Keating, supported by Minister for Land Transport Bob Brown, argued forcefully for the rejection of the proposed tax breaks, but were overruled by the rest of Cabinet, led by the Prime Minister, who wished to at least consider the joint venture's proposal. Keating and Brown were tasked to a subcommittee to examine the proposal in more depth, along with ministers John Button, John Dawkins and Ralph Willis, in March 1991.

In May 1991, the subcommittee reported that delayed-income projects were not disadvantaged by current tax law, under which interest expenses could be claimed ahead of the operational phase. The magnitude of the concessions sought was also revised downward to between $900–$1,200 million.

The joint venture's tax proposal was released in July 1991, and called for companies involved in delayed-income projects to be allowed to distribute tax-losses to shareholders – in effect, allowing the shareholders of the VFT to claim a tax-deduction of 39 cents in the dollar on VFT expenditure, whether the VFT eventually earned taxable income or not. In the report prepared by Clayton Utz, they argued that the existing tax arrangements create a strong bias against start-up ventures, as start-ups have no existing income against which to offset tax losses incurred in the construction phase of a large infrastructure project. The proposed treatment was essentially to treat deductions in the early years of a project "as if they were those of a fully-owned subsidiary of another company".

== Breakup of the joint venture ==
As the complicated negotiations with various parties wore on, cracks began to show in the relationship between the eclectic members of the joint venture. Their diversity, which previously had been a strength, now began to be seen as a potentially fatal weakness.

On 25 August 1990, Elders IXL announced it was withdrawing from the joint venture, reportedly due to financial difficulties related to its restructuring as Foster's Group. It forced the cancellation of the joint venture's first meeting with the most senior levels of government, including the Prime Minister, premiers of NSW and Victoria and the ACT Chief Minister. Elders' 25% share in the venture was put up for sale.

In October 1990, tensions emerged between TNT and the remaining members over the strategic direction of the project. TNT were unhappy the proposal to offer a freight service, which would directly compete against Ansett Australia, in which TNT held a controlling interest. Additionally, the decision to pursue an inland route, rather than the more passenger-focussed coastal route, was another source of contention. Initially, TNT withheld $1.5m in funding in an attempt to influence the consortium to abandon these plans. However, when this was unsuccessful, they withdrew all funding in January 1991, reportedly "losing interest" in the proposal, although they retained a member on the VFT Management Committee. Peter Abeles, whose initial interest in the VFT had been critical to forming the joint venture, was particularly aggrieved; he was driven by a desire to develop the remote Australian south-east, and made no secret of his distaste for the new strategy, reportedly telling the consortium "You've lost the plot".

In May 1991, chief executive Alan Castleman told reporters he expected additional changes to the membership of the consortium; talks were being held with "three banks and three industrial companies" who were interested in joining, should the question of tax concessions be settled favourably. However by July, Kumagai Gumi had also pulled out of the venture, leaving BHP the sole remaining partner still funding the VFT.

In August 1991, after a lengthy period of consideration, Federal Cabinet rejected the taxation arrangements proposed by the joint venture, citing the "revenue costs and resource allocation implications of allowing wider access to tax losses for all taxpayers." The Treasurer John Kerin stated that Cabinet was concerned that the changes sought for VFT would set a precedent.

BHP announced that it was suspending all expenditure on the VFT project the following day. In a statement, BHP expressed confidence in the benefit of the VFT to Australia, and regret at the need to pull out. It also described the proposed tax concessions as "a means of passing on legitimate tax deductions to investors".

The joint venture closed its project office in Canberra on 12 September 1991, marking the end of the Very Fast Train proposal.

== Aftermath ==
Reaction to the breakup of the Very Fast Train Joint Venture was mixed, with some condemning the government for "lack of vision", and others hailing it as the economically sound decision. Although the joint venture blamed the collapse of the project on the failure to secure favourable taxation arrangements, other reasons were speculated to include opposition from environmentalists, noise concerns from residents near the proposed track, the disparate aims and fractious relationship of the joint venture members, public questioning of the joint venture's motives, and an escalation in projected costs, all of which contributed to a lack of support from the Federal government in Canberra.

Dale Budd later downplayed the role that the tax concessions had in the demise of the VFT, saying they reduced the projected 25% nominal rate of return by "between 2 and 3 per cent". According to Budd, the main reason was that few companies operating in Australia at the time had the scale to offset an accounting loss in the order of hundreds of millions of dollars; additionally, the economic climate of 1990 was such that most companies were incurring quite enough real losses anyway, and were therefore unable and unwilling to absorb accounting losses from a large infrastructure investment.

Alan Castleman also suggested that the financial rationale for the VFT remained sound, and blamed the failure on a lack of understanding "of how much positive action, if not money, is needed from governments at the planning level to make big projects such as the VFT work."

=== Subsequent developments ===
The south-east corner of Australia now has less transportation infrastructure than when the VFT was proposed. The Gippsland line was closed east of Bairnsdale in 1987 and the Cooma line south of Queanbeyan in 1988, following closure of the Bombala line in 1986. Services on the Gippsland line improved in 2006 after a substantial line upgrade and VLocity railcars capable of running at 160 kilometres per hour (99 mph) were introduced. Nevertheless, the journey epitomised the fundamental difference between running conventional trains faster on existing lines and running trains on dedicated high-speed tracks. The Pakenham–Traralgon express journey time of 1 hour 18 minutes for a distance of 103 kilometres (64 mi) equates to only 79 kilometres per hour (49 mph), and from Melbourne to Traralgon the 2 hours 21 minutes to cover 160 kilometres (99 mi) equates to 68 kilometres per hour (42 mph) – slightly slower than the scheduled speed from Canberra to Sydney that had failed to impress Dr Wild in 1984. The VFT scheduled time for Melbourne to Traralgon was to be 30 minutes: 1 hour and 51 minutes quicker than today's journey time.

Budd and Abeles were both involved with later high-speed rail proposals between Sydney and Canberra, with Budd spearheading the Speedrail Consortium proposing a shorter version of the VFT, and Abeles advocating a maglev link via Wollongong. Speedrail came close to getting the green light but was also cancelled in 2000 when the government refused to subsidise the project. There were also several proposals to upgrade the existing tracks to accommodate faster tilting trains.

The proposed underground railway to Sydney Airport was completed in 2000 as a CityRail suburban railway.

Following the cancellation of the Speedrail proposal in 2000, the Howard Government commissioned a study into a very high speed railway linking the east-coast capitals. The $2.3 million report, released in November 2001, proposed a route broadly similar to the VFT proposal, and estimated construction costs at $41 billion if 250 km/h technology was selected, $47 billion for 350 km/h, and as high as $59 billion for 500 km/h mag-lev technology ($58, $67 and $84 billion in 2014, respectively). The high cost estimates, which would have to be 80% government funded, led the government to abandon the second phase of the report, and so a detailed alignment was not proposed.

In December 2008, the Rudd government announced that an east-coast very high speed railway was its highest infrastructure priority. A $20 million study was undertaken in two phases, with Phase 1 released in August 2011 and identifying a preferred route, and Phase 2 finalising a detailed corridor selection as well as costings and demand forecasts. It estimated the 1748 km railway between Melbourne, Sydney and Brisbane with a spur line to Canberra would cost $114 billion (100% publicly funded) and not be fully operational until 2065. It was heavily criticised for its extremely high cost estimates and absurdly long construction timeframe, with the suggestion that this meant the government had never intended the project to go ahead.

The Very Fast Train Joint Venture's series of studies remain the most expensive investigation of high speed rail performed in Australia with a cost of over $37 million in 2013 dollars, and no proposal has come closer to becoming a reality. It remains the only high-speed rail proposal to have maintained a promise of no net cost to the taxpayer.
