= Keith Boardman =

Australian biochemist (1926–2026)

Keith Boardman AO FAA FRS FTSE

Chairman of the CSIRO
- In office 25 September 1985 – 4 December 1986
- Preceded by: Paul Wild
- Succeeded by: Neville Wran

Chief Executive of the CSIRO
- In office 5 December 1986 – 4 March 1990
- Succeeded by: John Stocker

Personal details
- Born: Norman Keith Boardman; 16 August 1926 Geelong, Victoria, Australia
- Died: 26 October 2026 (aged 100) Canberra, Australian Capital Territory, Australia
- Education: University of Melbourne (BSc); University of Melbourne (MSc); University of Cambridge (PhD)
- Occupation: Chemist

Norman Keith Boardman (16 August 1926 – 26 October 2026) was an Australian biochemist who made contributions to the understanding of photosynthesis. He led Australia's main public research organisation, CSIRO, through a period of major change and restructure.

Boardman was elected a fellow of the Australian Academy of Science in 1972, a fellow of the Royal Society in 1978 and a fellow of the Australian Academy of Technological Sciences and Engineering in 1986. He was made an officer of the Order of Australia (AO) in 1993.

== Early life and education ==
Keith Boardman was born in Geelong, Victoria, on 16 August 1926. His father worked for the Victorian Railways and his mother was a dressmaker. His mother was a "strong character" and "helped him a lot with spelling and writing". He attended Geelong High School where he won a Rushall Scholarship which enabled him to complete a final honours year at Melbourne Boys' High School. He shared the science prize at the school and was awarded a Dafydd Lewis Trust scholarship to do a science degree at Melbourne University.

He graduated with a Bachelor of Science degree from the University of Melbourne in 1946 and later, after winning a Daffyd Lewis Trust Scholarship to continue his studies at Melbourne, he completed a master's degree in physical chemistry on the thermodynamics of molten salts in 1949. He later went to St John's College, Cambridge on a further Daffyd Lewis Trust Scholarship where he undertook a doctoral degree.

== Career ==
=== CSIR/CSIRO ===
In early 1949, Boardman was appointed research officer in the Wool Textile Research Section at the Council for Scientific and Industrial Research (CSIR) in Geelong. Following the establishment of the Commonwealth Scientific and Industrial Research Organisation (CSIRO) on 25 March 1949, he commenced his position in April 1949 as a member of the CSIRO.

Boardman investigated the adsorption and polymerisation of methacrylamide in wool and also the effects of the internal deposition of a number of vinyl polymers on the elastic and shrinkage properties of the wool fibre. He developed an interest in the molecular structure of wool and the role of certain amino acids. This led to his interest in doing a PhD in protein chemistry at Cambridge and he was given leave from CSIRO to do this.

=== University of Cambridge ===
Boardman was awarded a scholarship from the Dafydd Lewis Trust to undertake doctoral studies at the University of Cambridge, an uncommon postgraduate award from the trust. His research at the university's Low Temperature Research Station focused on the separation of proteins by chromatography using ion-exchange resins. He married Mary Clayton Shepherd of Geelong at the historic Norman Round Church in Cambridge in July 1952. They had a loving and successful partnership for 71 years and had 5 daughters and 2 sons.

After completing his PhD in 1953, he resigned from the CSIRO and accepted an ICI Fellowship which enabled him to continue his research at Cambridge. During this period, he worked in an environment that contributed to the emerging field of molecular biology and developed an appreciation of the importance of applying advanced physical and chemical techniques to the study of complex biological systems.

=== Return to Australia and the CSIRO ===
In 1956, Boardman returned to Australia to join the CSIRO's Division of Plant Industry in Canberra, where he was recruited to establish the division's chromatography facilities. Although funding was available for the purchase of equipment, he later noted that much of the apparatus was constructed by the division's highly-skilled workshop staff.

His research first focused on protochlorophyll and its conversion to chlorophyll. Working with Jan Anderson, he helped characterise chlorophyll-protein complexes and used this work to demonstrate that the two photochemical systems of photosynthesis are physically separated. He also studied the structure and development of chloroplasts in green plants.

Boardman was awarded a Fulbright Scholarship to the University of California, Los Angeles, in 1964 to do research with Samuel G. Wildman on the synthesis of proteins in chloroplasts isolated from leaves. It was established that protein synthesis in chloroplasts is carried out on ribosomes similar to those in bacteria.

In 1967, he received the University of Melbourne's David Syme Research Prize for his work in biochemistry, particularly on photosynthesis and chlorophyll. In 1969, he was awarded the Lemberg Medal by the Australian Biochemical Society in recognition of his pioneering research into the biochemistry, development, and molecular architecture of chloroplasts, particularly his contribution to the separation of the two photochemical systems of photosynthesis.

He was actively involved with the Australian Biochemical Society where he was the treasurer from 1957 to 1961 and with the biology panel of the Australian Research Grants Committee (ARGC) of which he became the chair in 1975.

Boardman was elected a Fellow of the Australian Academy of Science in 1972 for his work on the development, structure and function of higher plant chloroplasts.

=== CSIRO leadership ===
Boardman was appointed a full-time member of the CSIRO's executive in 1977 for one year. This was the year of the Birch enquiry into the CSIRO and longer appointments were not being made until the outcome of that report was clear. In the period from 1977 until the election of the Hawke government in 1983, Boardman was a key driver in the implementation of the Birch report with its institute structure and greater emphasis on obtaining user input into the organisation's research program. He worked closely with the chairman, Paul Wild.

The Birch report had endorsed the idea of the CSIRO as an ongoing national research organisation. The report recognised that the CSIRO (and before it, the CSIR) had been doing a reasonable job in identifying and implementing a wide range of important national objectives for the conduct of research. It also recognised the importance of appointing world-leading scientists to manage teams of scientists, and that the CSIRO had generally proven itself in this role. While accepting that the CSIRO's practice of reviewing its divisions on a regular basis had been productive, it criticised the CSIRO's failure to plan its work, particularly at the national strategic level, in a way that was properly transparent. It therefore recommended the establishment of a Planning and Evaluation Advisory Unit. It fell largely to Boardman to respond to this challenge.

Another substantial recommendation of the Birch report was to reorganise the top management of the CSIRO into a small number of Institutes, each comprising relevant Divisions and associated units and centres. Boardman took on the job of implementing this recommendation. The changes were not popular amongst many of the chiefs of divisions who had enjoyed considerable independence.

The election of the Hawke government with Barry Jones as the science minister and the retirement of Paul Wild, saw Boardman appointed chairman of the CSIRO from 1985 to 1986. The Hawke government asked the Australian Science and Technology Committee (ASTEC) to review the CSIRO. That review recommended further changes in the governance arrangements of the CSIRO, namely that the organisation be governed by an independent board and managed by a chief executive. That is that Boardman's previous position as chairman (and chief executive) be split into two roles in line with governance best practice. Neville Wran (the former Premier of New South Wales) was appointed the first chairman under the new arrangements and Boardman as the first chief executive. The position of chairman was part-time and that of chief executive was full-time.

The first board meeting was held in December 1986 and the board appointed Boardman as the chief executive. He understood that he had two main tasks. The first was to ensure that the tradition of pursuing world-class science and applying this to problems in the Australian economy, a tradition established by George Julius, David Rivett, Ian Clunies Ross and Fred White be maintained and strengthened, and the second, that the new governance arrangements be implemented as smoothly as possible. He succeeded in both of those tasks and was made an officer of the Order of Australia in 1993 "in recognition of service to science and to the CSIRO".

== Death ==
Boardman died in Canberra on 26 October 2026 at the age of 100.

== Awards and recognition ==
Boardman was awarded the David Syme Research Prize in 1967 and the Lemberg Medal in 1969. He was elected a fellow of the Australian Academy of Science in 1972 and a Fellow of the Royal Society in 1978. He was appointed an officer of the Order of Australia (AO) in the 1993 Australia Day Honours for his contribution to science and the CSIRO.
