= Harry Messel =

Australian physicist (1922–2015)

Harry Messel, AC, CBE, (3 March 1922 – 8 July 2015) was a Canadian-born Australian physicist and educator.

== Life and work ==
Messel was born in Canada to Ukrainian parents. He was born in Levine Siding in Manitoba, and brought up in Rivers, Manitoba. He was accepted into the Royal Military College of Canada. During the Second World War he served as a paratrooper with the Canadian Forces. He entered Queen's University in Kingston, Ontario, in 1946, enrolling in both Honours Engineering Physics and an Honours Degree in Mathematics.

After fellowships at University of St Andrews and Dublin Institute for Advanced Studies, Messel moved to Australia in 1951. He lectured in mathematical physics at the University of Adelaide 1951–52, before being appointed in 1952 as Professor of Physics and Head of the School of Physics at the University of Sydney, a position he held for 35 years until his retirement in 1987. In 1952 he established the Nuclear Research Foundation, later known as the Science Foundation for Physics.

Messel was also Chancellor and CEO of Bond University 1992–1997.

When the Soviet satellite, Sputnik 2, passed over the Southern Polar region in 1958, Messel recorded the encrypted data while the satellite was at its apogee of 1671 km. However, the Soviets, who were unable to collect the data themselves, refused to release the interpreting code. When they asked Messel for the data, he told them to "go to hell".

In 1958 Professor Messel started the International Science School (ISS), which aims to encourage scientifically capable and interested students in their final two years of school to extend their knowledge and apply it to achieve progress. He frequently stated his discontent when sportsmen were praised and hailed whereas the next generation of scientists to change and run the world were given little to no encouragement. Since its inception, over 4,000 scholars have attended the ISS. The program runs once every two years with close to 150 students from up to 10 countries staying at the Women's College for two weeks, attending lectures and participating in activities around the University of Sydney.

=== Honours ===
Messel was appointed a Commander of the Order of the British Empire (CBE) in the 1979 New Year's Honours list; and a Companion of the Order of Australia (AC) in the 2006 Australia Day Honours 2006 for his service to Australian science and to education as an outstanding educator raising awareness of the importance of the study of science and in particular physics, for instrumental contributions to improving science teaching in schools, and for conservation advocacy relating to endangered crocodile and alligator species.

In 2014, Messel, along with Simon McKeon, was awarded the Australian Academy of Science's Academy Medal, which recognises scientific contributions other than research. The award to Messel was made "in recognition of his conspicuous and enduring service to the cause of science in Australia".

=== Personal life ===
Messel was married to Patrica Pegram, a nurse from Sussex, England whom he met in Dublin. They had three daughters, Naomi, Wendy and Iona.

Academic offices
Preceded by Elizabeth Nosworthy	Chancellor of Bond University; 1992 – 1997	Succeeded by Paul Scully-Power
