= Professor Harry Messel International Science School =

The Professor Harry Messel International Science School (ISS) is a fee-free residential educational event for selected secondary students held for two weeks in July every two years and based at the University of Sydney in Sydney, Australia which has gained renown. ISS aims to honour excellence in senior high school science students and to encourage them to consider careers in science.

The ISS offers presentations by internationally respected guest lecturers from Australia and overseas to 140 science students from 10 countries (50 students) and Australia (90).

The ISS is funded by the Messel Endowment and grants from various sources.

== Len Basser Award for Scientific Leadership ==
The Australian Government funds the Len Basser Award for Scientific Leadership which is awarded to a student who demonstrates both strong academic interest in participating in the ISS and collegiality in sharing his/her understanding of the science being taught with fellow students.

== History ==
The ISS began in 1958. The first four Science Schools were annual events held for high school teachers. The first International Science School for students was held in 1962 and, until he retired in 1987, the driving force was Professor Harry Messel. Since his retirement, the ISS has operated under the Science Foundation for Physics.

Since one student from New Zealand attended the very first Science School, overseas students have been a feature of the ISS. In 1967, ten students from the USA joined the School; the following year they were joined by five from the United Kingdom and five from Japan. Southeast Asia joined the ISS in 1985, when students attended from Singapore, Malaysia, Thailand and the Philippines. China has sent five students to every ISS since 1999, except for 2003 when the SARS epidemic restricted travel in the region.

The ISS was held annually from 1962 until 1975. Since 1977, it has been held every two years.

== Lecture series ==
One of the features of the International Schools is the lecture series: a set of lectures on various aspects of science given by scientists, researchers, and other experts. Past ISS lecturers include James Watson, who won a Nobel Prize for discovering the structure of DNA, and Jerome Friedman, also a Nobel laureate for his work on particle physics, Sir Hermann Bondi (physicist and astronomer at Cambridge University), Margaret Burbidge (astronomer with the Hubble Space Telescope), Carl Sagan (writer and science communicator), and Robert May (President of the Royal Society). The summer program in 1979 included lectures by Ronald N. Bracewell and Thomas Gold.

Also featured were the demonstrations of Julius Sumner Miller. Later, Dr Karl Kruszelnicki, the Foundation's Julius Sumner Miller Fellow, entertained and enthused the ISS Scholars with his "Great Moments in Science".

== Publications ==
The most recent ISS papers are:

- Future Power : the lecture series of the 39th Professor Harry Messel International Science School : 2–15 July 2017, Chris Stewart (ed)
- BIG : the lecture series of the 38th Professor Harry Messel International Science School : 28 June–11 July 2015, Chris Stewart (ed)
- Nanoscience : the lecture series of the 37th Professor Harry Messel International Science School : 1–12 July 2013, Chris Stewart (ed)
- Light and Matter : the lecture series of the 36th Professor Harry Messel International Science School : 3–16 July 2011, Chris Stewart (ed)
- Genes to galaxies : the lecture series of the 35th Professor Harry Messel International Science School : 12–25 July 2009, Adam Selinger and Anne Green (eds)
- Ecoscience : the lectures series of the 34th Professor Harry Messel International Science School : 1–14 July 2007, Chris Stewart and Anne Green (eds)
