= Ken Henry =

Ken Henry may refer to:

- Ken Henry (public servant) (born 1957), Australian economist and public servant, Secretary of the Department of the Treasury, 2001–2011
- Ken Henry (speed skater) (1929–2009), American Olympic speed skater
- Kenneth Henry (judge), Bahamian judge, President of the Court of Appeal from 1987 to 1992
