= Ted Evans (public servant) =

Australian public servant (1941–2020)

Ted Evans AC

Executive Director of the International Monetary Fund
- In office 29 April 1989 – 28 April 1993

Secretary of the Department of the Treasury
- In office 24 May 1993 – 26 April 2001

Personal details
- Born: Edward Alfred Evans; 4 March 1941 Ipswich, Queensland, Australia
- Died: 12 April 2020 (aged 79) Canberra, Australian Capital Territory, Australia
- Spouse(s): First Heather (dec); Second Judith
- Education: University of Queensland
- Occupation: Public servant

Edward Alfred Evans AC (4 March 1941 – 12 April 2020) was an Australian senior public servant and economist. From 1993 to 2001, he was Secretary of the Department of the Treasury.

== Career and public life ==
Evans was born into a humble background. His father was a fitter and turner. Evans first studied at Ipswich High School in Queensland in the late 1950s and trained as a technician in the 1960s working in the Ipswich branch of the Postmaster-General's Department. Studying economics while working, Evans graduated with a Bachelor of Economics from the University of Queensland in 1969 with first class honours and a University Medal. One of his colleagues in his student honours group in the University of Queensland in 1967 was Adrian Pagan who later became a well-known Australian academic economist. Upon graduation, Evans joined the Department of the Treasury and moved to Canberra.

Throughout the 1970s and 1980s, Evans held various positions in the Australian Treasury in Canberra and in several overseas posts. Between 1976 and 1978 he was posted from Treasury as the Economic Counsellor at Australia's Permanent Delegation to the OECD in Paris. Later, between 1989 and 1993, he was posted as an executive director to the IMF in Washington. One of his contributions while on the Board of the IMF was to support the establishment of an evaluation office at the Fund. In speaking in favour of the proposal at a Board meeting in January 1993, Evans suggested that the new office be called the "Independent Evaluation Office", a suggestion later adopted by the Fund.

His colleague David Morgan noted that Evans was one of a small team of officials who were extremely influential within Treasury for many years:

He was at the centre of a small extremely tight group in Treasury that saw Treasury rise to unprecedented power and influence in the 1980s. Chris Higgins was part of that cadre, as was I. The three of us were extremely close friends. Ted also nurtured a group of the best and brightest within Treasury, including Ken Henry and Martin Parkinson, both of whom went on to become successful secretaries to the Treasury.

Evans was appointed secretary of the Treasury in March 1993 having previously been offered the job in 1991 when he turned it down. During the time he was secretary of the Treasury, he gave various public talks focusing on economic policy. Evans entered into the debate attracting much attention at the time about the significance of the national current account deficit (CAD), arguing that key aspects of worries about the CAD were misplaced. His central argument was that while it was true that the CAD reflected the difference between national savings and investments, more attention should be given to the ways that funds were invested rather than to worries about the need to increase savings. Later, following the Asian financial crisis in 1998, he took part in public discussions about economic challenges in Asia and the implications for Australia.

As secretary of the Treasury, he was ex officio member of the boards of several financial institutions. He was a director of the Commonwealth Bank of Australia between 1993 and 1996, and a member of the board of the Reserve Bank of Australia from 10 May 1993 to 26 April 2001.

== Retirement ==
Evans retired from the public service in April 2001, having served eight years as Treasury head. He said that one of his proudest achievements as Secretary of Treasury was introducing the Taxation Review Board.

After retiring from the public sector, Evans joined the Westpac board. He served as a board member between 2001 and 2011 and as chairman between 2007 and his retirement.

In 2013, Evans was outspoken over the sacking of Martin Parkinson and three other public service secretaries, saying that the Abbott government was wasting good people and politicising the bureaucracy.

Evans died on 12 April 2020. In a message of tribute, Australian prime minister Scott Morrison said that Evans "was renowned for his sharp intellect, modesty, integrity and the quiet fearlessness and forcefulness of his advice, earning the respect of Prime Ministers and Treasurers on all sides of politics". Treasurer Josh Frydenberg recalled that "It was his powerful advocacy and intellectual leadership which was behind many of the key economic reforms in the 1980s, 1990s and 2000s. The floating of the dollar, the deregulation of the financial sector, labour market flexibility and the development and implementation of the goods and services tax were all shaped by Ted's contributions."

== Awards ==
In June 1999, Evans was made a Companion of the Order of Australia (AC) in recognition of service to Australian economic policy development. In 2001, at a ceremony in Brisbane, the University of Queensland recognised Evans as Alumnus of the Year.

Government offices
Preceded by C.R. Rye	Executive Director of the International Monetary Fund; 1989 – 1993	Succeeded by E.L. Waterman
Preceded by Tony Cole	Secretary of the Department of the Treasury; 1993 – 2001	Succeeded by Ken Henry
Business positions
Preceded by Leon Davis	Chairman of Westpac Banking Corporation; 2007 – 2011	Succeeded by Lindsay Maxsted
