= Rudd government (2007–2010) =

Australian government

Rudd government (I)

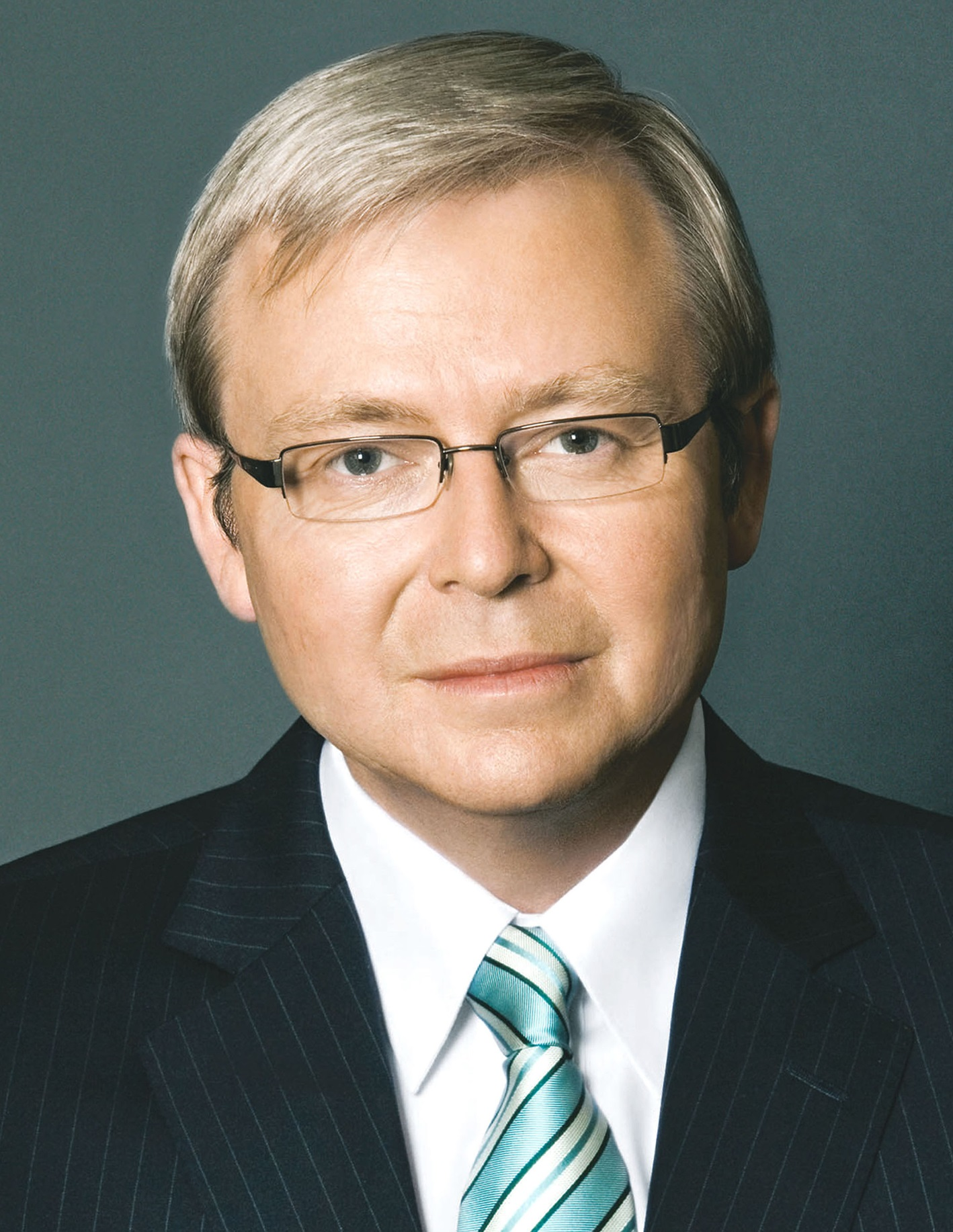

In office
- 3 December 2007 – 24 June 2010
- Monarch: Elizabeth II
- Governor-General: Dame Quentin Bryce (September 2008 – June 2010); Michael Jeffery (December 2007 – September 2008)
- Prime Minister: Kevin Rudd
- Party: Labor
- Status: Majority
- Origin: Labor wins 2007 federal election
- Demise: Rudd loses 2010 Labor leadership spill
- Predecessor: Howard government
- Successor: Gillard government

The first Rudd government was the executive Government of Australia formed by the Australian Labor Party (ALP) and led by Prime Minister Kevin Rudd. The Rudd government commenced on 3 December 2007, when Rudd was sworn in along with his ministry. This took place just nine days after the defeat of the Howard government, which was a Coalition of members of the Liberal and National parties, at the 2007 federal election. The Rudd government concluded on 24 June 2010 when Rudd, under pressure from an impending leadership caucus ballot, stepped down from the leadership of the ALP and was succeeded by his deputy, Julia Gillard. Rudd was re-elected leader of the Labor Party in 2013 and served a second term as prime minister.

== Economy ==
The Rudd government issued its first budget in May 2008, which was initiated to fight inflation. The total expenditure, as a share of gross domestic product (GDP), was lower than any of the previous governments, despite including many of the expensive election promises for "working families". The projected surplus of 1.8% of GDP, or $21.7 billion, exceeded the 1.5% target set by the government in January. Labor supported improving the federal–state funding process through a reform of the Council of Australian Governments. Three nation-building investment funds were established – the infrastructure fund, "Building Australia", was designated $20 billion of federal funding. Education received $10 billion as part of Rudd's "education revolution", while health also received $10 billion.

In the 2008–09 budget, the Rudd government cut $63.4 million over four years from the CSIRO, forcing the closure of two laboratories and the loss of 100 jobs. It also cut $20 million from the Australian Bureau of Statistics.

In response to the 2008 financial crisis, the Rudd government announced in October 2008 that it would guarantee all bank deposits. The government initially ignored Reserve Bank of Australia (RBA) advice to cap the guarantee.

With the economy experiencing its biggest slowdown since the early 1990s and facing a recession, the government announced an economic stimulus package worth $10.4 billion. A second economic stimulus package worth $42 billion was announced in February 2009, consisting of an infrastructure program worth $26 billion, $2.7 billion in small-business tax breaks, and $12.7 billion for cash bonuses, including $950 for every Australian taxpayer who earned less than $80,000 during the 2007–08 financial year. At the same time, the RBA cut official interest rates by a percentage point, lowering them to 3.25%, the lowest since 1964 (a 43-year low).

The package was welcomed by state governments and many economists, as well as the OECD. The Malcolm Turnbull-led coalition opposed the package, stating that they believed additional tax cuts to those which had been planned the next few years was a better way to prevent a recession. The package was passed in the Senate on the 13 February with support from minor parties and independents, following amendments that reduced the cash bonuses in the package to fund investment in the environment and water supply.

National accounts released on 4 March 2009 showed that Australia's non-farm sector shrunk for the September and December 2008 quarters.

The 2009 Australian federal budget was released on the evening of 12 May 2009. Labor decided not to extend the investment allowance, and it was phased out by the end of the year. Other measures to support employment – augmenting a first-home buyer's scheme – were initiated.

During the March quarter, the Australian economy grew by 0.4%, a number not foreseen by many until the positive balance of trade statistics released the day before. The main contributors to this result were the large fall in the current account deficit and increasing household consumption. Apart from the manufacturing sector, the Australian economy avoided a technical recession. RBA economists endorsed the first two phases of stimulus a year later, saying that it was "undeniable" that government spending had supported the economy. RBA governor Glenn Stevens remained cautious of American-style fiscal policy, casting doubt on the idea that Australia should have a higher inflation target to repair its public accounts.

The Rudd government established a review of the tax system by the head of the Department of the Treasury, Ken Henry. Among other suggested reforms recommended by the Henry review and adopted by the Rudd government was a Resource Super Profits Tax on the extractive industry. The proposal met resistance from mining industry bodies and mining companies, and the proposal was later heavily modified when Julia Gillard replaced Rudd as prime minister.

== Defence ==
In December 2007, the Minister for Defence, Joel Fitzgibbon, ordered the Department of Defence to develop a new white paper to guide Australia's defense policy. While the white paper was originally due to be completed in December 2008, it was delayed until 2009 due to the volume of work required. The white paper, entitled Defending Australia in the Asia Pacific Century: Force 2030, was released on 2 May 2009 and outlines a significant expansion to the Australian Defence Force, intended to maximize the military's capacity to act independently in Australia's region.

Other defence policies enacted by the Rudd government include cancelling the contract to purchase 11 Seasprite helicopters in March 2008, and beginning the process of planning the replacement for the Navy's Collins-class submarines.

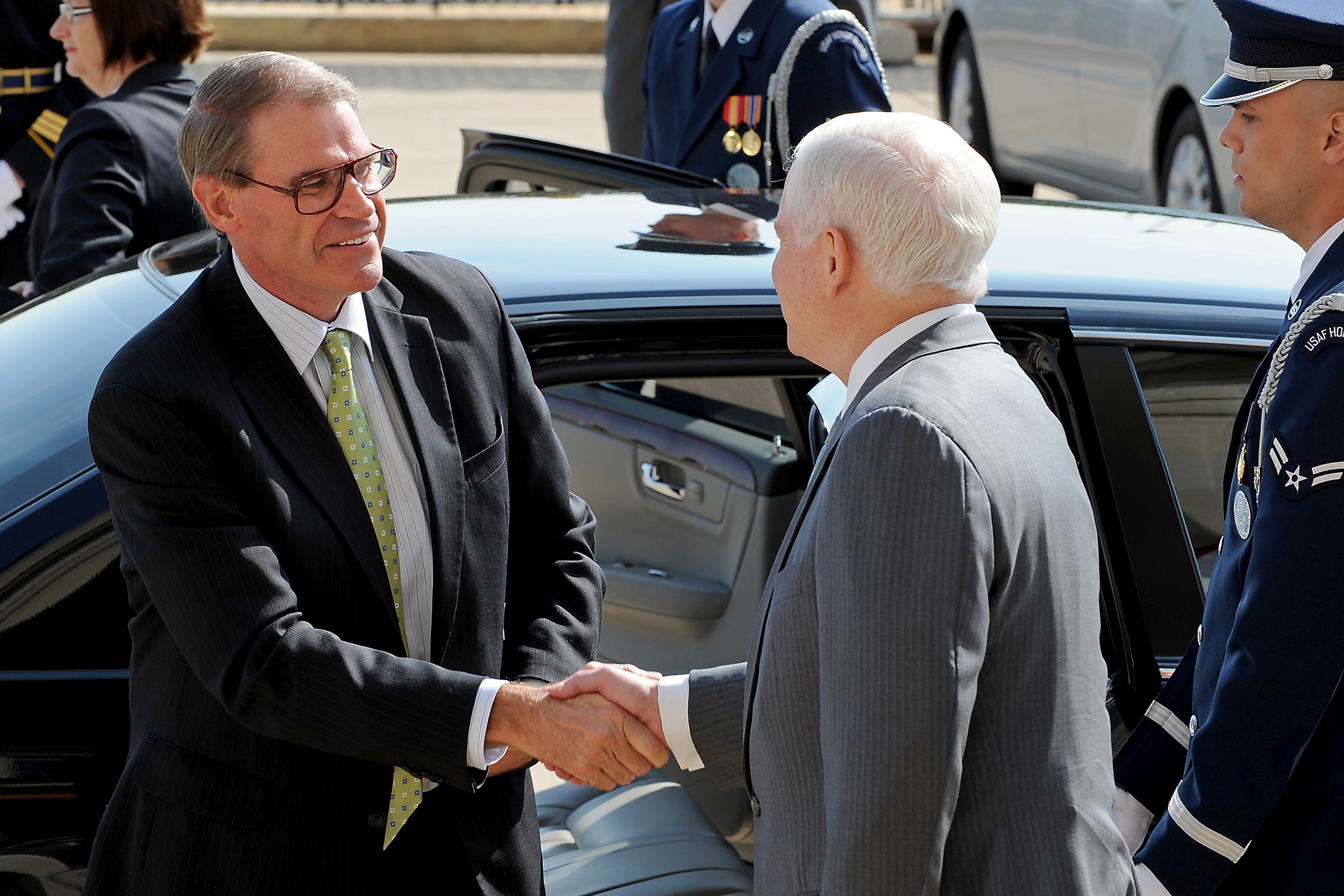
John Faulkner, Minister for Defence

The Rudd government altered the number of Australian troops deployed to Afghanistan and Iraq. The 550 combat troops deployed on an overwatch mission in central-southern Iraq were withdrawn in mid-June 2008, fulfilling an election promise. This reduced the Australian Defence Force presence in the region to 800–900 support personnel, including 440 either on the ground in Iraq or patrolling the coastline. As of early 2009, around 150 support personnel remained in Iraq. In contrast, the Australian force in Afghanistan was expanded, with Rudd announcing in April 2009 an increase from 1,100 to 1,550 personnel.

Fitzgibbon became the first Rudd government minister to resign, on 4 June 2009. He quit after admitting that meetings concerning business opportunities held between defence officials and his brother, the head of nib Health Funds, had breached the Ministerial Code of Conduct. John Faulkner was appointed to succeed in the Defence portfolio.

== Education ==
One of the Rudd government's key proposals in the 2007 election campaign was the implementation of an "education revolution". This was to include the provision of computers for every school student in years 9–12 and the implementation of a national curriculum.

=== Scholarship for disadvantaged students ===
In 2010, a new suite of scholarships was developed; the Student Start-Up Scholarship and the Relocation Scholarship. These scholarships were developed as part of the Rudd government's response to the Bradley Review of Higher Education, and its recommendation to tighten eligibility for Youth Allowance by reforming the 'work test' coupled with a loosening of the parental income test. The government abolished the old scholarship system, which helped about 21,000 students per year, due to concerns that it was not adequately means tested and that many scholarships were not allocated as a result of being administered by the universities. However, the new system was stalled in the Senate as a result of opposition by the Liberal-National Opposition and Senator Fielding. This left an estimated 150,000 students waiting for the changes to pass parliament two weeks before the start of the academic year in March. The new scholarship system was a massive extension of the system of support, provided as an entitlement, based on parental income and administered by Centrelink. Criticism of the new system centred on claims that it would disadvantage regional students. One university in Queensland topped up its food bank, anticipating that the number of students regularly going without food would increase.

In 2009, the Coalition and Senator Fielding had blocked changes to the Youth Allowance and Austudy system, stating they were unfair to rural and regional students and would leave 26,000 students worse off. The bill would have tightened regulations around the work requirements these students needed to fulfill to be considered independent of their parents. However, the two country independents in the House of Representatives, Tony Windsor and Rob Oakeshott, supported the changes. The Bradley Review had found that the old system had been accessed disproportionally by students from high-income families despite being intended to support those from disadvantaged backgrounds.

To win the support of the Greens and Senator Nick Xenophon and to mitigate the opposition of the Liberals and secure passage of the bill, Education Minister Julia Gillard loosened some aspects of the changes to rural arrangements. This allowed students from remote areas to access the workforce test with the additional requirement that their parents earned less than $150,000. The Student Start-Up Scholarship was cut (by about $200) to just above $2000 to pay for these changes. However, the impasse meant that, in mid-February, an estimated 150,000 students were waiting for the bill to pass in time for the start of the Australian academic year. Ultimately, the government secured passage as a result of the changes and the new scholarship was provided in the first semester of this year. In 2013, the Labor government proposed a cut to the value of the Student Start-Up Scholarship, to turn it into a loan which would fund the Gonski Reforms. However, after losing the election and forming the opposition, Labor changed its position and opposed these cuts which became supported by the Liberal government. These changes are yet to pass the Senate.

== Environment and energy management ==
In opposition, Rudd had called climate change "the greatest moral, economic and social challenge of our time" and called for a cut to greenhouse gas emissions by 60% before 2050.

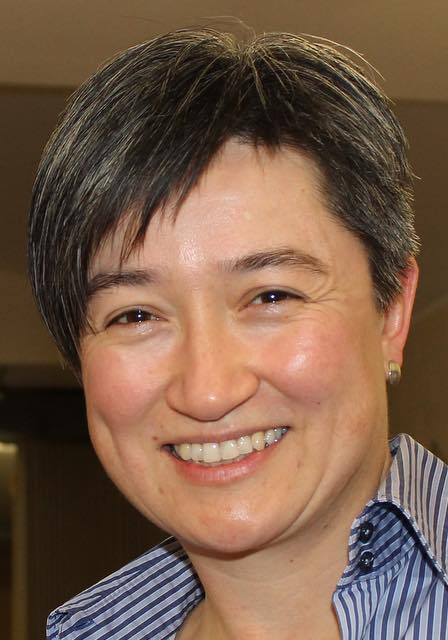
Penny Wong, Minister for Climate Change and Water

In October 2007, John Howard, Prime Minister at the time, said that Labor's policy on climate change negotiations had no significant differences to the Liberals' policy. At the time, econometric research suggested that providers of carbon credits under the voluntary Australian Greenhouse Office trading scheme were capable of stabilising emissions, due to the demand from households for carbon-neutral products.

On 3 December 2007, hours after being sworn in, Rudd signed the Kyoto Protocol. Rudd described this action as a "significant step forward in our country's efforts to fight climate change domestically – and with the international community".

After a year of accounting of "emissions" and "sinks", the government published its climate change policies in a white paper released on 15 December 2008. This defined a plan to introduce an emissions trading scheme in 2010 and recommended a target range for Australia's greenhouse gas emissions in 2020, which would be a 5% to 15% reduction from levels in 2000. It drew criticism from environmental groups and the federal government's climate change advisor, Professor Ross Garnaut. Garnaut said that the government's conditional 2020 emission targets were too low, and that the planned assistance measures for emissions-intensive industries pose "profound" financial risk for the government. In May 2009, Rudd announced an increase of the scheme target to a 25% reduction from levels of 2000, but that the introduction of the scheme would be delayed until July 2011.

In June 2010, the environment minister, Peter Garrett, revealed in an interview with Sky News that he first learned of the change in policy when he read it in a newspaper after being leaked by a government source. This followed damaging comments by Professor Tim Flannery, a strong supporter of Labor's scheme, that he felt "betrayed" by the prime minister's decision.

The government articulated its stance on energy management in October 2009. Writing in The Australian Financial Review, the resources minister, Martin Ferguson, acknowledged that withholding resources such as coal (either black or brown) is unlikely to do much to assist in reducing emissions or alter demand. The government instead hoped to become a world-leading investor in carbon capture and storage technologies, and expand Australia's natural gas production, while continuing to support a raft of new coal-mining projects worth about $11 billion. The government also had plans to support growth of the renewable energy industry.

== Foreign relations ==
The Rudd government attempted to increase Australia's international influence. Prime Minister Rudd announced in March 2008 that Australia would seek a non-permanent seat on the United Nations Security Council for 2013–14, which the country had last held in 1985–86. In November 2009, the Age newspaper reported that $11 million had been spent campaigning for the seat, and had added twenty-seven votes for Australia; the majority of the votes came from small island nations in the south Pacific and six African nations.

The Rudd government lobbied for the G20 Forum to replace the G7 as the premier forum for global governance and economic management and secured a seat for Australia at the forum.

The Rudd government sought to improve relations with China. Trade developments including the Gorgon gas project saw major deals between Australia and China. In an April 2008 visit to China, Rudd addressed an audience in Mandarin at Beijing University, in which he told students that Australia had concerns over human rights issues in Tibet and later repeated the comments to Premier Wen Jiabao. The Chinese Communist Party reacted angrily to the remarks, describing Tibet as "purely an internal affair". The Rudd government's relations with the Communist Party were further strained by the Stern Hu Affair, in which, following a failure by China to secure the purchase of Australian mining assets, Australian businessman Stern Hu was accused of "stealing state secrets" during trade negotiations on behalf of Australian mining company Rio Tinto, and subsequently received a ten-year jail sentence for paying bribes. The Rudd government's 2009 Defence white paper identified the rise of China as a potential threat to Asia Pacific security, and during the WikiLeaks affair, confidential diplomatic cables were released which purported to show that Rudd had warned the US secretary of state Hillary Clinton that the Communist Party was "paranoid" about Taiwan and that the US should be prepared to use force against China "...if everything goes wrong".

Responding to the New South Wales coroner's late November 2007 finding that the Balibo Five had been deliberately murdered by the Indonesian military in 1975, Rudd commented that "those responsible should be held to account. ... You can't just sweep this to one side". As opposition leader he had argued for the repatriation of their remains. However, no meaningful action was taken when Rudd became PM, and he refused the requests of relatives of the slain journalists to visit their graves while in Indonesia.

Rudd's term in office coincided with the final months of the Bush administration in the United States. After reports in domestic media that Rudd had joked with journalists that George W. Bush did not know what the G20 Forum was, the press reported that Rudd received a frosty welcome from Bush at the White House dinner that opened G20 summit in Washington in November 2008. Bush's successor, Barack Obama, had a warmer relationship with Rudd, telling the Australian media in April 2010 that Rudd was "smart but humble" and the political leader he was closest to on the world stage.

== Immigration ==
2010 ABC news report of a bilateral agreement with Indonesia to "tackle the problem" of boat arrivals.

Chris Evans served as Minister for Immigration and Citizenship in the Rudd government, which maintained Australia's bipartisan policy in support of the multi-ethnic annual intake of immigrants. Rudd said that he believed in a "Big Australia" and projected a population of 35–36 million by 2050.

The Rudd government moved in its early months to dismantle several components of the Howard government's approach to unauthorized arrival immigration policy – it abandoned offshore processing of asylum seekers and temporary protection visa arrangements. The Coalition said that these practices had halted the trade in people smuggling from Indonesia to Australia, but the Labor Party said these were ineffective and inhumane. The issue of asylum seeker policy remained controversial through the term of the Rudd government. The number of asylum seeker boat arrivals increased throughout the period and the handling of the issue was identified by supporters of Julia Gillard's challenge to Kevin Rudd as a motivating factor in his replacement.

=== Asylum seekers ===
At the 2007 election, Rudd stated:

You'd turn them back. ... You cannot have anything that is orderly if you allow people who do not have a lawful visa in this country to roam free. That's why you need a detention system. I know that's politically contentious, but one follows from the other. Deterrence is effective through the detention system but also your preparedness to take appropriate action as the vessels approach Australian waters on the high seas.

— Kevin Rudd, 2007 election campaign.

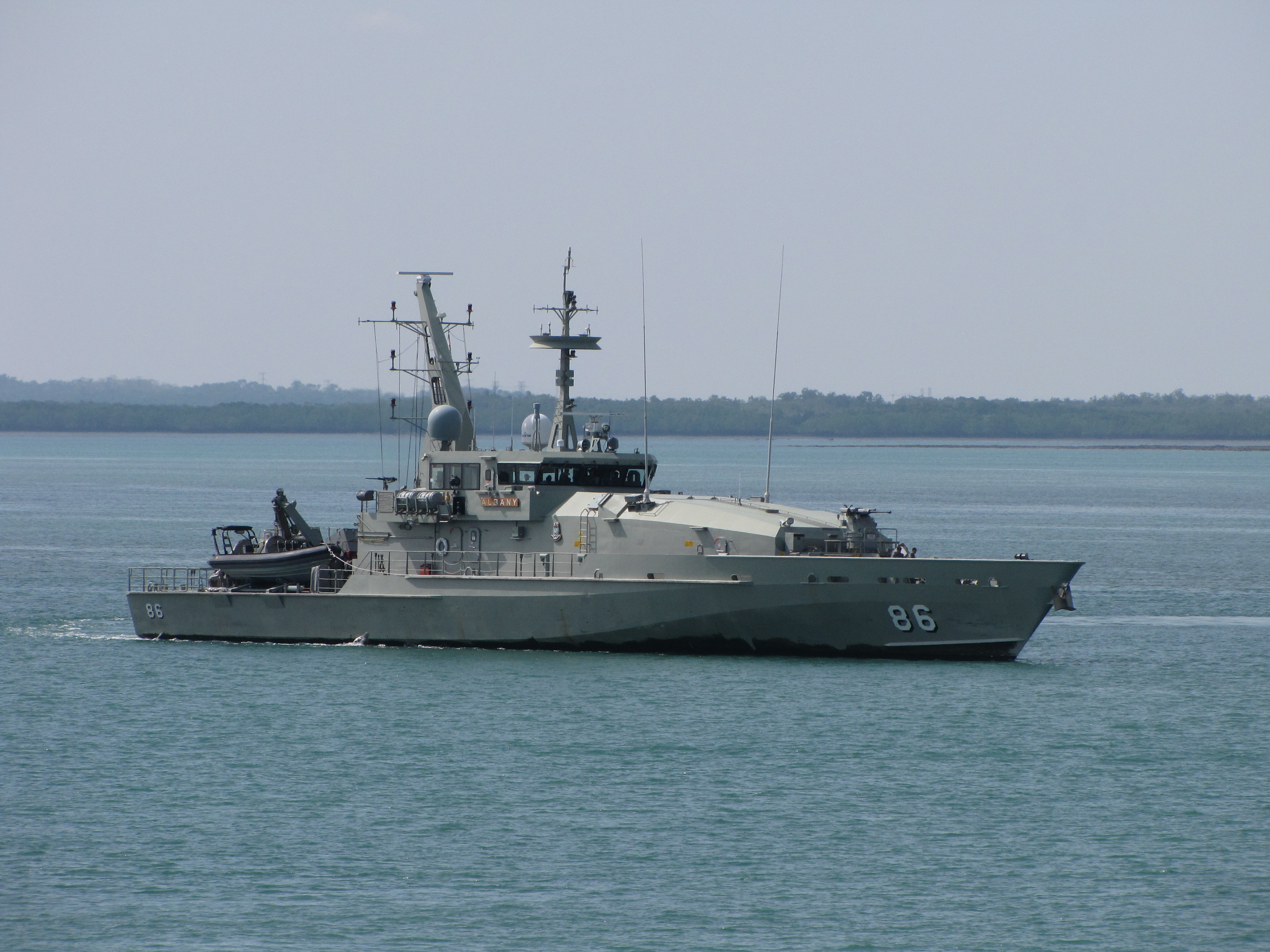
HMAS Albany, one of the patrol boats involved in attending the rescue involving a fatal explosion due to sabotage of the SIEV 36 by people smugglers.

Chris Evans was appointed Minister for Immigration and Citizenship in the First Rudd ministry and retained this portfolio in the First Gillard Ministry. The newly elected Rudd government announced a series of measures aimed at achieving what it described as a more "compassionate policy". Howard's policy, called the Pacific Solution, had involved offshore processing, a system of "temporary protection visas" for unauthorized arrivals, and a policy of turning back boats where possible. The Rudd government dismantled all three components, dubbing them "ineffectual and wasteful". The government adjusted the mandatory detention policies established by the Keating and Howard governments and on 8 February declared an end to the Pacific Solution. The policy had involved the establishment of offshore processing centres on Manus Island in Papua New Guinea (closed 2004) and at Nauru. In announcing the demise of the policy, Evans described it as "a cynical, costly and ultimately unsuccessful exercise", and the 21 people housed at the Nauru detention center were transferred to Brisbane.

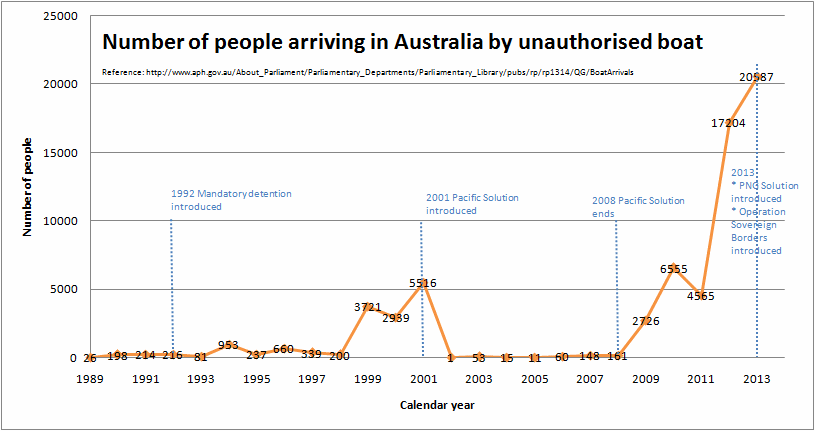
Persons arriving by unauthorised boat to Australia by calendar year

In May 2008, the Asylum Seeker Resource Centre said that the Department of Immigration and Citizenship was rejecting asylum-seeker applications at a higher rate than under the previous government, noting 41 of 42 applications had been rejected. Evans claimed a denial rate of 77 percent, based on his acknowledgment that of a caseload of 730 appeals, he has intervened in 170. In July 2008, the Australian government announced that it was ending its policy of automatic detention for asylum seekers who arrive in the country without visas. While it remained committed to the policy of mandatory detention as an "essential component of strong border control", the Rudd government announced that detention would be restricted to unlawful non-citizens who posed a threat to the community, those who refuse to comply with visa conditions, or those who need to be detained for the period of conducting health, identity and security checks. The government announced the cessation of the detention of children and the provision of legal advice to unauthorized arrivals.

In April 2009, following the relaxation of border protection policies, there was an increase in asylum seeker vessels which culminated in a fatal explosion due to sabotage on one of these vessels. In response, the government announced a new strategy of offering financial support to Indonesia to assist in their efforts to reduce people smuggling to Australia. After the explosion, Rudd said: "People smugglers are the vilest form of human life."

Unauthorised boat arrivals in Australia increased from 161 people in 2008 to nearly 3,000 people in 2009. The opposition said that this was due to the government's policy adjustments, while the government said that it was due to "push factors". Rudd had a conversation with Susilo Bambang Yudhoyono, the President of Indonesia, on 20 October to intercept vessels bound for Australia. The government had made provisions to house refugees in spare demountable housing on Christmas Island, as the detention centre there was becoming crowded. In 2010, as the Christmas Island facility reached its official capacity, the United Nations High Commissioner for Refugees (UNHCR) noted in its annual report that despite global refugee numbers remaining steady, there was a 29% increase in asylum claims for 2009. This supported claims that the government's policy changes had led to the increase.

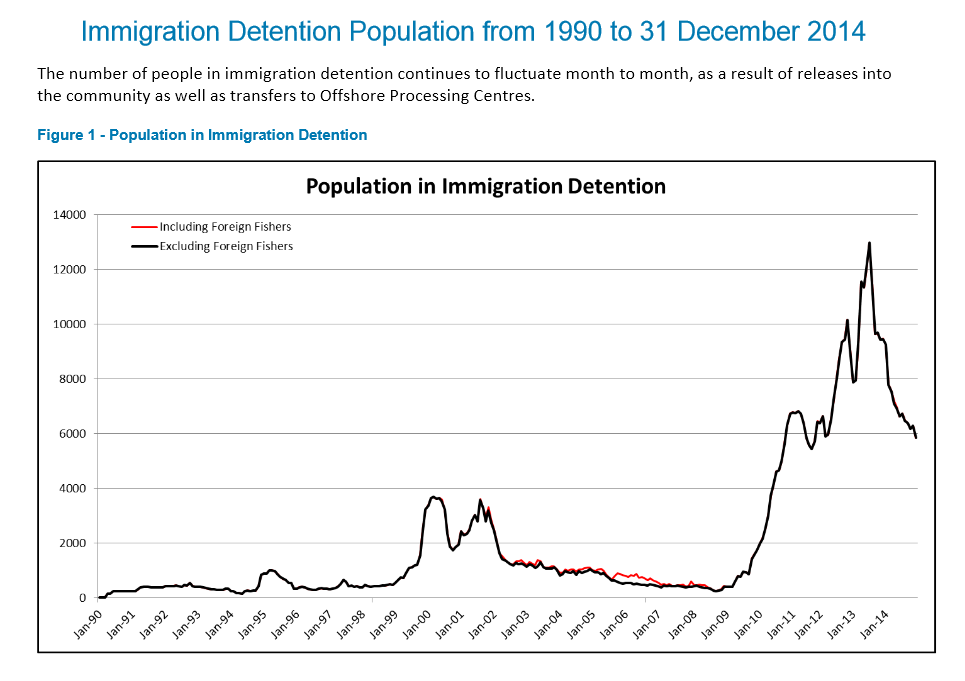
Immigration Detention Population to December 2014

In October 2009, the MV Oceanic Viking was involved in an emergency operation rescuing 78 Sri Lankan asylum seekers in international waters within the Indonesian sea rescue zone. Those rescued were due to be landed in Indonesia, for transfer to an Australia-funded immigration detention centre on the Indonesian island of Bintan. However, the asylum seekers refused to disembark until 18 November, following assurances of fast-tracked processing of their cases for resettlement. In the Australian Parliament, Rudd described this assurance as "non-extraordinary". Opposition frontbencher Tony Abbott said that Rudd was inept and hypocritical in his handling of the issue during the affair. According to Geoff Kitney, a Fairfax journalist who has covered immigration since the 1980s, his explanation of the terms of the agreement left the impression that, at the very least, he knew it would be difficult to show that the deal was not a cave-in. The Sri Lankan Government said that the deal would encourage more people to risk the ocean journey to Australia. A UNHCR representative told The Australian that the deal was bad practice and would encourage similar behaviour.

By March 2010, 100 asylum seeker boats had been intercepted within Australian waters under the Rudd government. In April, the Rudd government suspended processing new claims by Sri Lankan and Afghan asylum seekers, who comprised 80 percent of all boat arrivals, for three and six months, respectively. A boatload of refugees arrived daily in May 2010, causing overcrowding on Christmas Island. West Australian premier Colin Barnett has been told by Evans that up to 90 asylum seekers would move to an unused mining camp near Leonora, more than 800 kilometres (500 mi) north-east of Perth.

Government policy towards unauthorised boat arrivals remained controversial for the life of the Rudd government. During the 2010 Labor leadership spill that resulted in Gillard replacing Rudd as prime minister, Rudd told media on 23 June: "This party and government will not be lurching to the right on the question of asylum seekers, as some have counseled us to do." The Gillard government made a further series of adjustments to Labor policy and moved to restore offshore processing of asylum seekers in 2011.

=== Resettlement programs ===
Despite an election promise to process 90 percent of claims for protection visas within 90 days, Immigration Department figures in October 2009 showed no improvement in the speed of processing claims since the change of government. As a proportion of the immigration intake, Australia accepted fewer refugees in 2009 than it did at any time under the Howard government.

The government had accepted more refugees from regional conflicts as the number of Africans fleeing to Australia declined. There had been a notable spike in Chin Burmese and Rohingya Burmese refugees being accepted from camps in Thailand and Bangladesh. Almost 1,400 Burmese refugees were accepted in the first six months of 2009. They were quietly resettled in northern Brisbane, in spite of a nationalist backlash against refugees that was developing in Queensland.

== Industrial relations ==
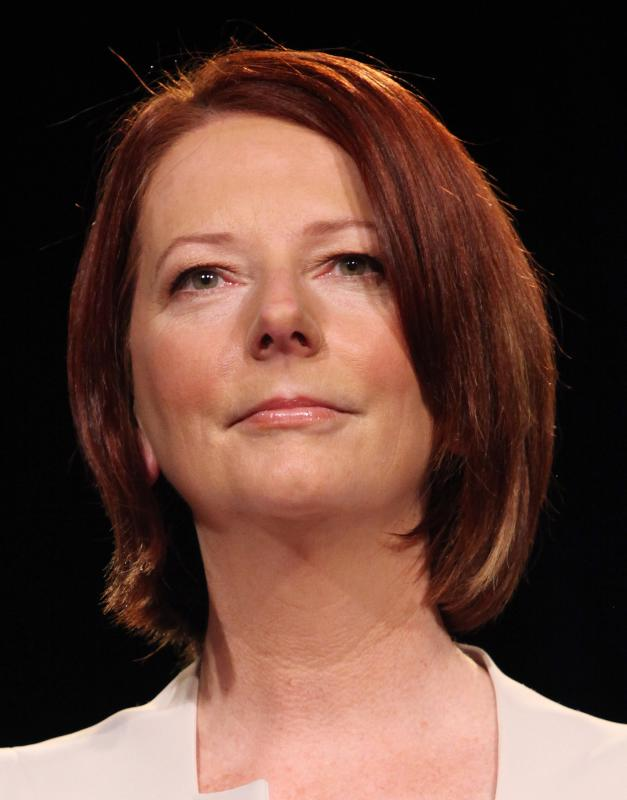
Julia Gillard, the Deputy Prime Minister and Minister for Employment and Workplace Relations

WorkChoices, the industrial relations regime introduced by the Howard government, was overhauled. Rudd's 2007 policy included the phasing out of Australian Workplace Agreements over a period of up to five years, the establishment of a simpler awards system as a safety net, the restoration of unfair dismissal laws for companies with under 100 employees (with a probation period of 12 months for companies with less than 15 employees), and the retention of the Australian Building and Construction Commission until 2010. It retained the illegality of solidarity action, the right of employers to lock workers out, restriction of union right of entry to workplaces, and restrictions on workers' right to strike. Rudd also outlined the establishment of a single industrial-relations bureaucracy called Fair Work Australia, which played a more interventionist role than the Howard government's Fair Pay Commission.

Some unions claimed it to be "WorkChoices Lite", referring to the Howard government's 2005 amendments to the Workplace Relations Act, although the most fundamental elements were reversed. Employer groups for the hospitality industry expressed concern over the legislation, suggesting more rigid and expensive wage and other outcomes with employees would be particularly difficult for many businesses to afford during an economic downturn.

== Communications ==
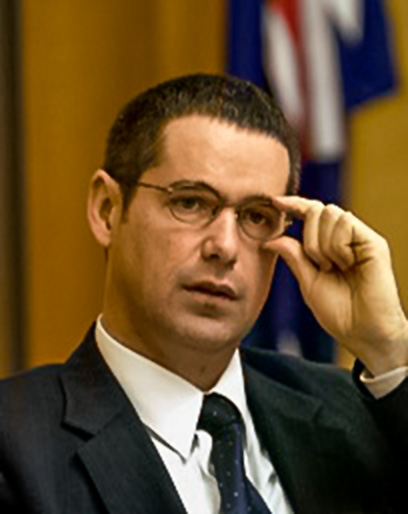
Minister for Broadband, Communications and the Digital Economy, Senator Stephen Conroy

Construction of a national fiber to the node National Broadband Network (NBN) was a key Labor promise in the 2007 election. The government advertised for requests for a proposal to build the network on 11 April 2008 and the tendering period finished on 26 November. The expert panel selected to assess the tenders found that none of them met the government's requirements. As a result, the government announced on 7 April 2009 that it was establishing a joint public-private company to build the NBN. Construction of the first stage of the network was planned to begin in July, with the project being estimated to take 13 years to complete at a cost of $43 billion.

== Social policy ==
=== Indigenous affairs ===
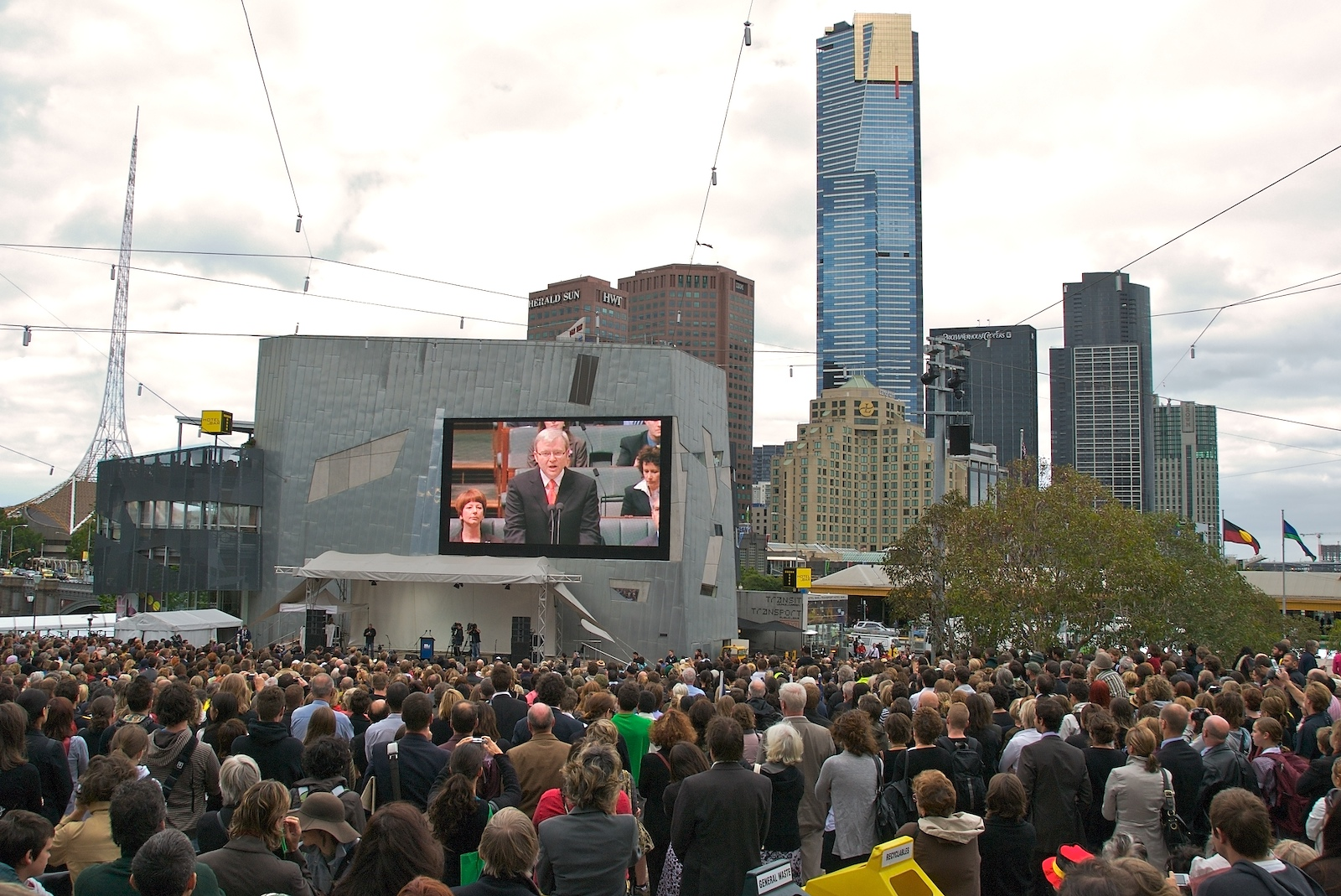
Kevin Rudd on screen in Federation Square, Melbourne, apologising to the stolen generations.

At the commencement of the 2007 election campaign and following John Howard's promise to call a referendum for recognition of indigenous Australians in the Australian Constitution, Rudd and Shadow Minister for Indigenous Affairs Jenny Macklin offered "bipartisan support to a commitment for constitutional recognition, regardless of the outcomes of the federal election". Two days prior to the election, Rudd told The Australian that Labor would not be proceeding with the policy "in the first term of a Rudd Labor government, if at all". In-office, the Rudd government did not pursue the issue further.

As the parliament's first order of business, on 13 February 2008, Rudd read an apology directed to Indigenous Australians for the stolen generations. The apology, on behalf of successive parliaments and governments, passed as a motion by both houses of parliament, and was publicly well received; most criticisms were of Labor for refusing to provide victims with monetary compensation as recommended in the Bringing Them Home report, and that the apology would not alleviate disadvantage amongst Indigenous Australians. Rudd pledged the government to bridging the gap between Indigenous and non-indigenous Australian health, education and living conditions. By signing the historic Close the Gap Statement of Intent on 20 March 2008, Rudd committed the government to achieving health equality in a way that respects the rights of indigenous people.

One year after the apology, Michael Mansell, Amnesty International and stolen generations victim Marjorie Woodrow called for the government to provide reparations as recommended in the Bringing Them Home report. In the first of the government's so-called 'indigenous report cards', delivered each year to parliament, Rudd said that new eye and ear health funding had been secured; noted that 80 houses for indigenous Australians had been built; said that the government had continued the Northern Territory Intervention; and gave his personal support to an initiative led by mining magnate Andrew Forrest to provide 50,000 indigenous jobs.

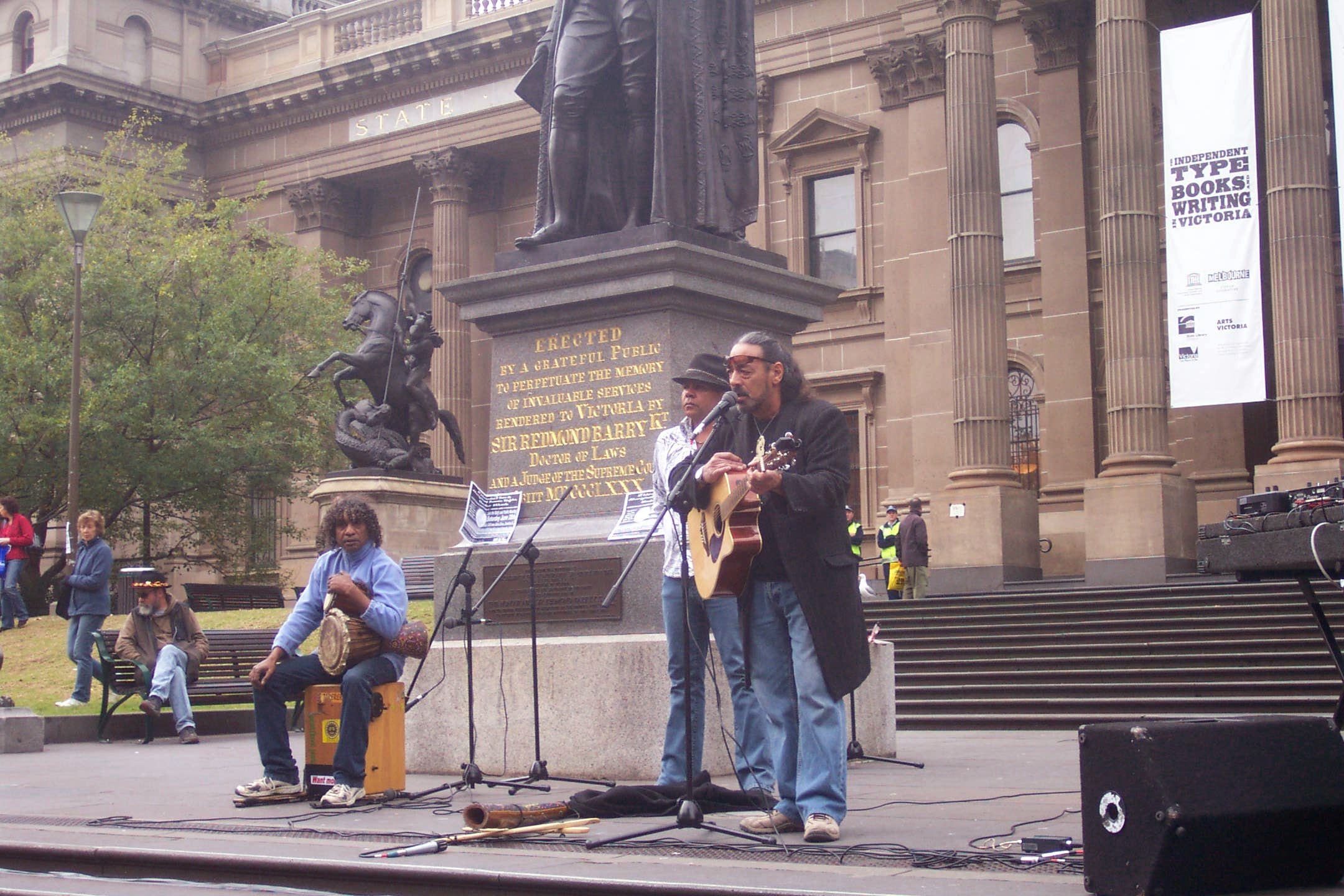
A participant of the Return to Country movement protests against the Rudd government's decision to hand over some powers back to the NT government, in front of the State Library, Melbourne.

One of the government's first reforms was to the maintenance of Indigenous housing, 95 percent of which was federally administered. Many Indigenous housing organisations are being wound down, with state and territory governments responsible for managing of all fields of community housing. Community housing in the Northern Territory has a life cycle of less than ten years.

In May 2009, the Rudd government handed over financial responsibility for 500 outstations – small communities in the Northern Territory – to the state government. Under a policy called A Working Future, the state set out $160 million to develop twenty "Territory growth towns" into hubs for surrounding communities. The towns would become economic and service centers, delivering all education and health services for the region and forcing people to move to be treated for diabetes, kidney and heart problems. Acting upon the advice of Patrick Dodson, the state agreed to maintain the $32 million of federal funding already in place for outstations. However, no new settlements would be approved, marking an end for the Return to Country movement.

After two and a half years, the government's $672 million Strategic Indigenous Housing and Infrastructure Program (SIHIP) had built only 11 of a planned 750 houses, and further funds were required for the project to retain its 2013 target completion date.

=== LGBT rights ===
A paper put out by Tom Calma and the HREOC in 2008 advocating for a new National Indigenous Representative Body

In April 2008 the government proposed greater recognition of LGBT rights in Australia by announcing reforms to the recognition of same-sex relationships in taxation, health, employment, superannuation, aged care and other areas. However, these changes would not affect marriage, IVF access, and adoption rights. Originally, 58 Commonwealth laws where gay couples faced discrimination were identified in the year-long Human Rights and Equal Opportunity Commission (HREOC) inquiry, "Same-Sex: Same Entitlements Inquiry", which was tabled in Parliament in June 2007. An audit conducted by the government in early 2008 found around 100 Commonwealth laws where gay couples faced discrimination. The last of the legislation to remove the discrimination that was identified in the reviews passed the Senate in November 2008.

== Australia 2020 Summit ==
In February 2008 Rudd announced the Australia 2020 Summit, held 19–20 April 2008, which brought together 1,000 leading Australians to discuss ten major areas of policy. The summit voted in favour of a plebiscite on Australia relinquishing "ties" to the United Kingdom followed by a referendum on the model for an Australian republic, a bill of rights, and the re-formation of an Indigenous peak representative body similar to Aboriginal and Torres Strait Islander Commission (ATSIC), which had been abolished by the Howard government in 2005.

In April 2009, Rudd announced that of the 962 recommendations of the summit, the following 9 would be adopted:

- A civilian regional disaster response organisation
- An indigenous cultural centre
- A national workplace mentoring program
- Bionic eye research
- An Asian scholarship program
- A children's television channel
- A business and schools roundtable
- A carbon emission skills program
- A tertiary education broadband network

== Gillard replaces Rudd as Labor leader ==
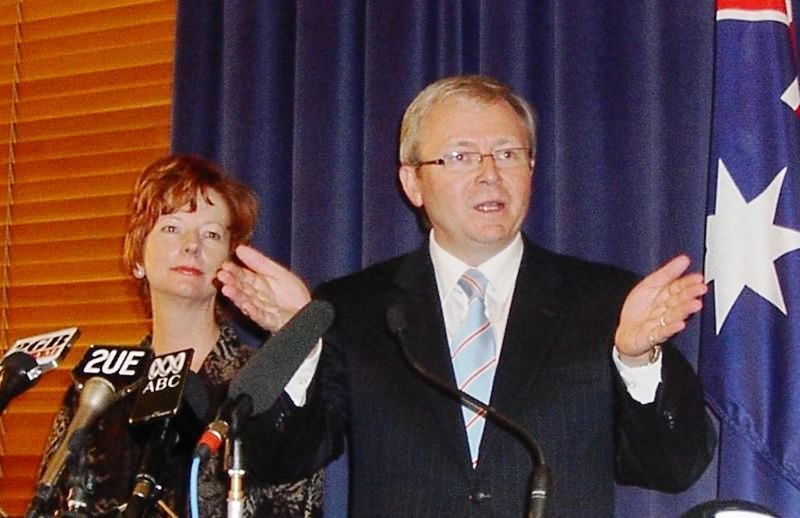
Julia Gillard with then opposition leader Kevin Rudd in 2006. Gillard became prime minister by challenging Kevin Rudd's leadership of the Australian Labor Party in 2010.

Approval ratings of Kevin Rudd's first tenure as Prime Minister (2007–2010). View source data.

After an initial period of popularity, by mid-2009, following the failure of the government's home insulation program and amidst controversy regarding the implementation of a tax on mining, the failure of the government to secure passage of its Carbon Trading Scheme and some debate about immigration policy, significant disaffection had arisen within the Labor Party as to the leadership style and direction of Rudd. According to ABC TV's The 7.30 Report, the seeds for a push for Gillard to challenge Rudd came from "Victorian Right factional heavyweights" Bill Shorten and Senator David Feeney, who secured the support of "New South Wales right power broker" Mark Arbib. Feeney and Arbib went to discuss the matter of leadership challenge with Gillard on the morning of 23 June and a final numbers count began for a leadership challenge.

As late as May 2010, prior to challenging Rudd, Gillard was relaying to the media that "There's more chance of me becoming the full-forward for the Dogs than there is of any change in the Labor Party". Gillard's move against Rudd on 23 June appeared to surprise many Labor backbenchers. Daryl Melham when asked by a reporter on the night of the challenge if indeed a challenge was on, replied: "Complete garbage. ABC has lost all credibility." As he was being deposed, Rudd suggested that his opponents wanted to move Labor to the right, saying on 23 June: "This party and government will not be lurching to the right on the question of asylum seekers, as some have counseled us to do."

The Sydney Morning Herald reported on 24 June that the final catalyst for Gillard's move was Rudd's staff probing the backbench for support in the wake of a Herald/Nielsen poll that showed Rudd would lose an election, an action seen as "a sign that he did not trust the repeated assurances by Ms Gillard that she would not stand". Following their departures from Parliament, Rudd's finance minister Lindsay Tanner (who resigned following Gillard's successful challenge to Rudd) and 2007–2010 Labor Member for Bennelong Maxine McKew sharply criticised the move against Rudd as an "ambush". In her 2012 book Tales From The Political Trenches, McKew wrote that Gillard was a "disloyal" and "impatient" deputy who was heavily involved in a well-planned operation to remove Rudd from the prime ministership.

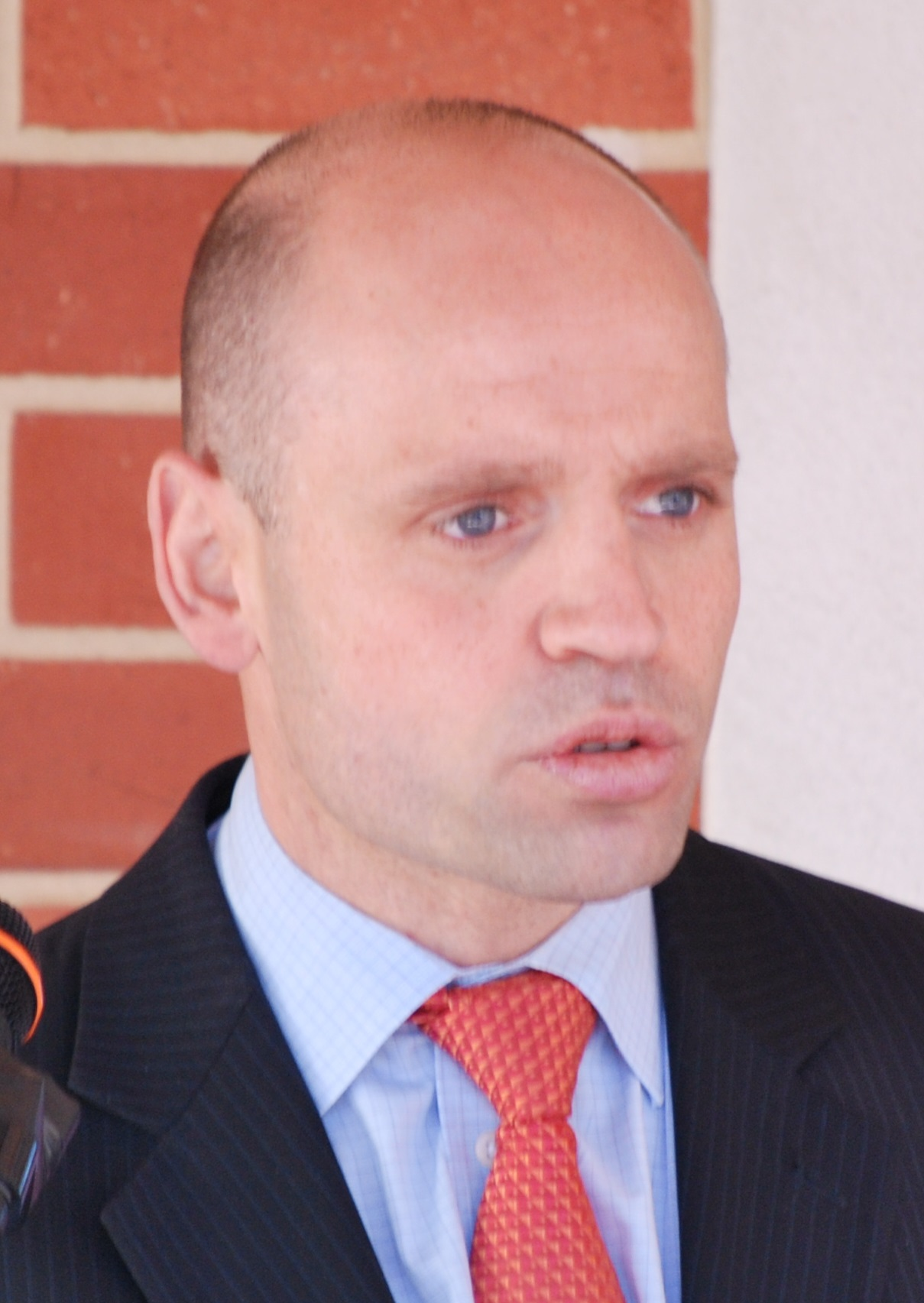
Mark Arbib of the New South Wales Right Faction.

On 23 June 2010, Rudd called a press conference announcing that a leadership ballot of the Australian Labor Party would occur on the morning of 24 June, with the candidates being himself and Deputy Prime Minister Gillard. This followed weeks of speculation that senior members of Labor were beginning to lose confidence in Rudd and would back Gillard in replacing him. By the eve of the election, it was obvious that Rudd lacked support to remain Labor leader and prime minister. Rudd withdrew his candidacy and resigned as party leader, leaving Gillard to take the leadership unopposed. Gillard was then sworn in as Australia's 27th prime minister by Governor-general Quentin Bryce, and became Australia's first female prime minister on 24 June 2010, with Treasurer Wayne Swan appointed as deputy prime minister.

In the aftermath of this leadership challenge, Shorten, a former trade union leader and key Parliamentary member of the Labor Right Faction, proposed that the shift in support was due to the government's handling of the home insulation program, the sudden announcement of change of policy on the Carbon Pollution Reduction Scheme, and the way in which the government had "introduced the debate" about the Resource Super Profits Tax.

Rudd conducted an emotional last press conference surrounded by family outside the prime minister's office on 23 June. He said that his economic management, removal of Workchoices, commencement of the National Broadband Network, education, health, welfare, environment, foreign and indigenous policies made him proud. He broke down when discussing the Stolen Generation apology. Rudd thanked supporters and the "great God and Creator" and promised to support the Gillard government.

In her first press conference as Labor Leader on 23 June, Gillard said that after three and a half years of "most loyal service", she had asked her colleagues to make a leadership change "because I believed that a good government was losing its way" and that Labor was at risk at the next election. She assured the public that her government would restore the budget to surplus in 2013 and said that it would build community consensus for a price on carbon and open negotiations with the mining industry for a re-vamped mining profits tax. She praised Rudd as a man of "remarkable achievement" and Wayne Swan as an outstanding Treasurer who would guide Australia to surplus.

Following his replacement as prime minister, Rudd remained within the government, initially as a backbencher. Following the 2010 election, Gillard appointed Rudd as foreign minister in her minority government. The leadership question remained a feature of the Gillard government's terms in office, and amidst ongoing leadership speculation following an ABC TV Four Corners examination of the events leading up to Rudd's replacement, which cast doubt on Gillard's insistence that she did not actively campaign for the prime ministership. Attorney General Nicola Roxon spoke of Rudd's record in the following terms:

"I don't think we should whitewash history – while there are a lot of very good things our government did with Kevin as prime minister there were also a lot of challenges, and it's Julia who has seen through fixing a lot of those problems."

— Attorney General Nicola Roxon, in a 2012 speech before a Victorian Bar conference in Melbourne.

Rudd resigned as foreign minister and unsuccessfully challenged Gillard for the leadership in a February 2012 spill.

Following Rudd's February 2012 resignation as foreign minister and leadership challenge, Gillard and a number of Labor MPs loyal to Gillard expanded upon the reasons for their move against Rudd, focusing particularly on his management style, with Gillard saying that the Rudd government had entered a period of "paralysis" and that Rudd was operating along "difficult and chaotic work patterns". Cabinet colleague Tony Burke also spoke against Rudd saying of his time in office that "the stories that were around of the chaos, of the temperament, of the inability to have decisions made, they are not stories".

== See also ==
- First Rudd ministry
- Rudd government (2013)
