= Henry Tax Review =

Review of tax policies in Australia

Australia's Future Tax System Review
- Date: May 13, 2008 – May 2, 2010
- Location: Australia
- Also known as: Henry Tax Review
- Type: Government Tax Review
- Cause: Australia 2020 Summit
- Organised by: Rudd government
- Participants: Ken Henry (Chair); Jeff Harmer; John Piggott; Heather Ridout, Greg Smith

The Australia's Future Tax System Review, colloquially known as the Henry Tax Review was commissioned by the Rudd government in 2008 and the final report was published in 2010. The review was intended to guide tax system reforms over the next ten to twenty years.

== Remit ==
The review was commissioned as one of the outcomes from the Australia 2020 Summit held in April 2008.

The review was a "root and branch" review, restricted only in that it could not consider increasing the rate or broadening the base of the Goods and Services Tax (GST), imposing tax on superannuation payments to retirees over 60 years of age, or already-announced personal income tax commitments.

== Panel ==
The review panel members included:

- Ken Henry (Chair), Secretary to the Treasury
- Jeff Harmer, Secretary, Department of Families, Housing, Community Services and Indigenous Affairs
- John Piggott, Professor of Economics and Associate Dean, Research, Australian School of Business, University of New South Wales
- Heather Ridout, Chief Executive, Australian Industry Group
- Greg Smith, Adjunct Professor, Economic and Social Policy, Australian Catholic University

== Recommendations ==
The report made 138 recommendations, under nine themes.

1. Concentrating revenue raising on four efficient tax bases: personal income, business income, private consumption, and economic rents from natural resources and land. Other taxes may be retained if they serve a specific policy purpose such as discouraging smoking or traffic congestion. Taxes fitting into none of these categories should eventually be abolished.
2. Configuring taxes and transfers to support productivity, participation and growth.
3. An equitable, transparent and simplified personal income tax: a much higher tax-free threshold (around AUD $25,000), only two tax brackets, and a simplification of superannuation, deductions and offsets.
4. A fair, adequate, and work supportive transfer system.
5. Integrating consumption tax compliance with business systems.
6. Efficient land and resource taxation.
7. Completing retirement income reform and securing aged care.
8. Toward more affordable housing: substantially increase rent assistance, gradually move to a uniform land tax and remove transfer taxes (stamp duty), and gradually move to a neutral treatment of rental and owner-occupied housing.
9. A more open, understandable and responsive tax system.

== Reception ==
=== Government ===
Rudd endorsed and implemented only three of the 138 recommendations.

The major item from the Henry Review implemented by the Rudd government was the move to create a Resource Super Profits Tax. The proposal was highly controversial, and has been suggested as the main reason why Rudd lost power. Following his replacement by Julia Gillard as prime minister, the proposed tax was replaced by a Mineral Resource Rent Tax (MRRT). The MRRT was eventually repealed by the Abbott government following the 2013 federal election. Most of the remaining recommendations were not implemented.
