= Gaetjens =

Gaetjens is a surname. Notable people with this surname include:

- Joe Gaetjens (1924–1964), Haitian soccer player
- Phil Gaetjens, Australian public servant
