= Ken Henry (public servant) =

Australian economist and public servant

Ken Henry AC
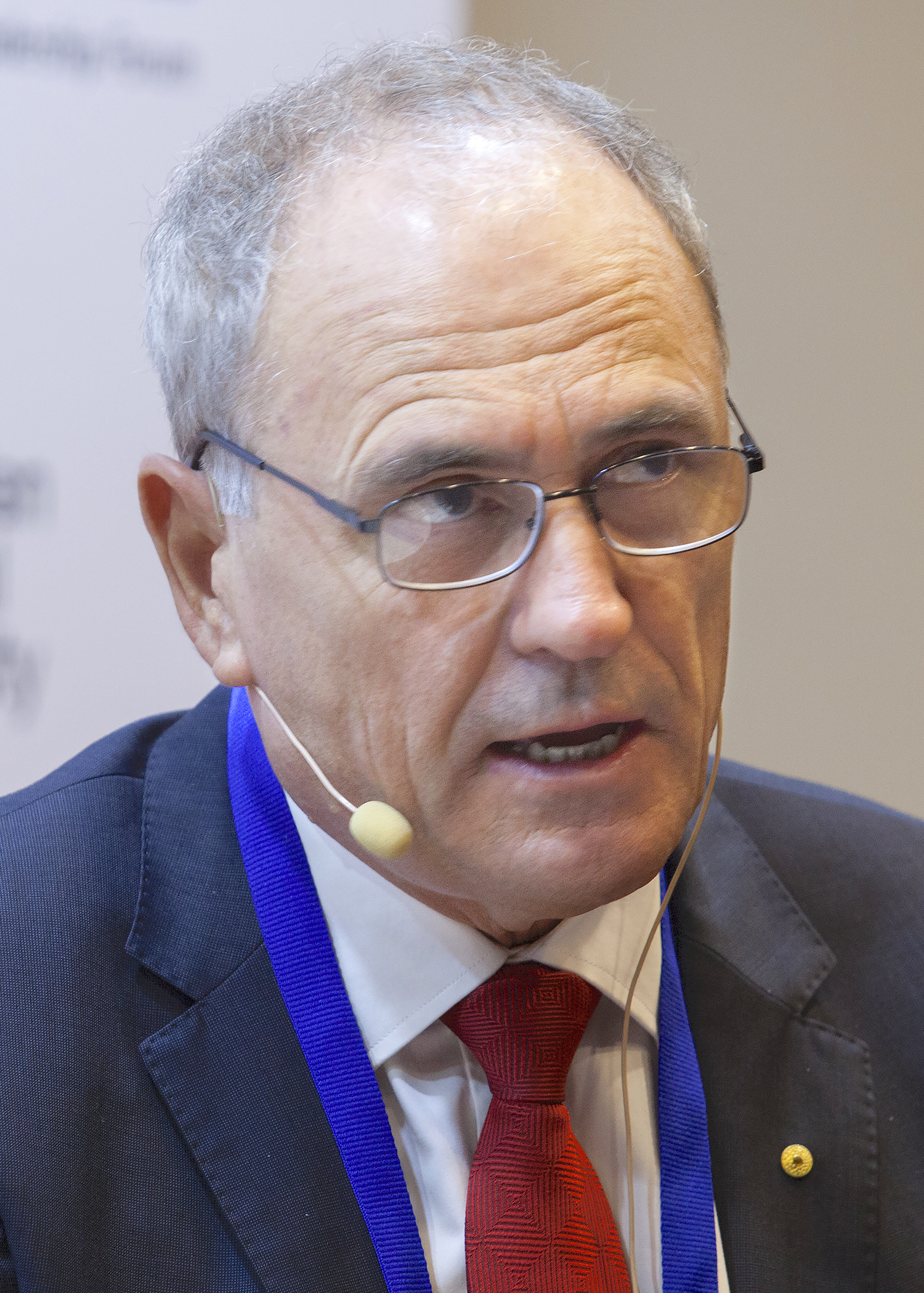
- Henry in 2017

Secretary of the Department of the Treasury
- In office 27 April 2001 – 4 March 2011
- Prime Minister: John Howard; Kevin Rudd; Julia Gillard
- Preceded by: Ted Evans
- Succeeded by: Martin Parkinson

Personal details
- Born: Kenneth Ross Henry; 27 November 1957 (age 68) Taree, New South Wales
- Education: University of New South Wales; University of Canterbury (PhD)
- Occupation: Economist; Public servant; Non-executive director

Kenneth Ross Henry AC (born 27 November 1957) is an Australian economist and public servant who served as the Secretary of the Department of the Treasury from 2001 to 2011.

During his time as Secretary of the Treasury, Henry chaired the major Future Tax System Review, which became known as the Henry Tax Review, a document published in 2010 which is credited with shaping Australian tax policy over the following decade. He retired from the public service in March 2011, and weeks later was appointed Special Adviser to Prime Minister Julia Gillard. During his time in this role, he chaired the committee which produced the White Paper on Australia in the Asian Century. He left his role as Special Adviser in 2013, and became Chairman of the Australian Securities Exchange, Chairman of the National Australia Bank, and joined the Sir Roland Wilson Foundation at the Australian National University.

== Education and early career ==
Ken Henry studied economics at the University of New South Wales, graduating in 1979. After, he lectured in economics at the University of Canterbury in New Zealand while studying for his Doctor of Philosophy degree at the same institution. From September 1986 to June 1991, Dr Henry worked as a senior adviser to the Labor Treasurer, Paul Keating, providing advice on taxation policy and administration, retirement incomes policy, industry policy and microeconomic reform (including telecommunications reform). In June 1991 he returned to the Treasury, becoming head of the Microeconomic Modelling Unit. In July 1992 he took up the position of Minister-Counsellor (Economic and Financial Affairs) in the Australian Delegation to the OECD in Paris. During this time, he has served as an Australian representative to the Organisation for Economic Co-operation and Development (1992–94). He was the Treasury department secretary from April 2001 until March 2011; and therefore an ex-officio member of the board of the Reserve Bank of Australia.

Henry remained head of Treasury in the transition from Liberal to Labor Governments in 2007. In 2008 he headed Australia's Future Tax System Review Panel, charged with examining all aspects of the Australian tax system with a view to reform.

== Treasury ==
=== Climate change ===
In 2004, Henry recommended a National Emissions Trading Scheme to thwart climate change, however the advice at the time was ignored. His recommendations have since been praised.

=== Consumption tax modelling ===
Henry has been criticised for his role in modelling the John Hewson Liberal opposition reform package known as Fightback!. That package contained as a central element a goods and services tax, similar to both the Option C developed by Henry for the Hawke Labor government in 1985, and the GST developed for the Howard Liberal Government in 1997. Henry rejects the claim that Treasury acted improperly, saying "We rejected that charge at the time. I would always reject it. There was nothing improper in what we did." He did concede, however that "it is the case that our work was used by the Government to attack publicly an Opposition policy." In reference to the Option C modelling he had previously worked on, Henry said:

It was like 1985 all over again. But in other ways it couldn’t have been more different … …But it was completely unlike 1985 in the sense that we were not helping the Government to develop a positive package. Kerin had never said to the department, 'I’m going to use this to monster Hewson’s tax package when he gets it out.' Although he’d never said that, we knew, obviously, what it was going to be used to do. We knew that Hewson’s package was going to include a broad based consumption tax, the thing which in 1985 we were helping the Government to design. So you could say that our hearts were not in the job. But we nevertheless had an instruction from the Government. 'You do it'.

— Canberra Times, 23 January 2006

When Fightback! came out, the model the team had developed enabled the identification of a major failing in the package. Income tax bracket creep had been used to fund the package but bracket creep had not been used in the analysis of the after tax income various taxpayers would receive. Treasury was accused by the Coalition of having acted improperly.

=== Pre 2007 election speech ===
In April 2007, the Australian Financial Review's Laura Tingle ran a story about Henry's semi-annual speech to staff. In the wake of the Howard Government's development of an A$10 billion policy proposal, Henry was reported as saying that there was a 'greater than usual risk of the development of policy proposals that are, frankly, bad' in the lead-up to the federal election.' Former Howard Government ministers suggested that it was a deliberate attempt to have Henry's critical views aired publicly to the detriment of the Howard government, and called it 'a deliberate piece of political positioning by Henry' prior to the 2007 federal election. Following the initial controversy, Henry released the full text of the speech, along with clarification. It said, in part, that:

The Government, our ministers and other agencies are under no compulsion to rely on our advice. In respect of water, that point is all too obvious. We are competing for influence with other central agencies, line agencies and independent policy advisers, such as think-tanks, commentators and consultants.... As I have noted on other occasions, I have never known the Treasurer to not welcome frank and honest advice when it is provided in-confidence and in good faith.

=== Bank Deposit Guarantee Scheme ===
Immediately prior to Henry's appearance at a Senate hearing into the Rudd Government's unlimited Bank Deposit Guarantee Scheme, an email from the Governor of the Reserve Bank of Australia, Glenn Stevens, to Henry was reported on in the media. No text was published, however The Australian newspaper alleged that the email expressed concerns of the Reserve Bank about a 'flight to safety' caused by the unlimited guarantee of deposits in Authorised Deposit-taking Institutions, and the consequent loss of liquidity in secondary credit markets. It claimed that Stevens called for a cap on the amount of a deposit guarantee '...the lower the better' and that he also said 'If this situation is allowed to continue, foreign bank branches will not be able to source funding in the local market as a flight to guaranteed deposits occurs.'

In the Senate hearing, Henry denied there had been any disagreement between Treasury and the Reserve Bank, and that the two bodies were 'of one mind' on the Bank Deposit Guarantee Scheme. Henry said that the Opposition's claim that Mr Rudd had ignored Reserve Bank warnings was based on a report in The Australian newspaper. Dr Henry called that report unfortunate, fallacious, unhelpful, and "W-R-O-N-G"

The Reserve Bank Governor backed Henry, stating that "steps in these directions, in the context of what other countries were doing, were sensible, and the RBA supports them."

=== Stimulus package ===
Treasury, under Henry, gave advice supporting the Rudd government's stimulus package, which was designed to lessen the size of an economic recession in Australia following the 2008 financial crisis. The package has been described by Nobel Prize–winning economist Joseph Stiglitz as 'one of the most impressive economic policies I've seen, ever'. The stimulus package foreshadowed $42 billion in spending measures. The classical Keynesian response embodied in the stimulus package, the desire to maintain expenditure in the economy, and the desire to avoid the destruction of human capital from a recession was encapsulated in the phrase attributed to Henry:

Go early, go hard and go households.

— Phrase attributed to Ken Henry

Henry stated that the stimulus package would either reduce future Government spending or drive up taxes, but he also said that this would occur in "a period of faster growth in private sector activity and the judgment that has been made is that in those circumstances . . . the Government will have the ability to repay debt without doing damage to gross domestic product growth".

Henry provided advice to the Rudd Government that without the continuation of the stimulus package, 100,000 jobs would be lost, and GDP would reduce by 1.5 percent. No modeling was made public to support either of these contentions. After the release of advice, Shadow Treasurer and Minister in the former Howard government, Joe Hockey, commented that he had never seen a piece of Treasury advice so clearly designed to be released to the media.

Further, graphs were subsequently printed in the budget papers purporting to show that there was a statistically significant correlation with the size of G20 member countries' stimulus packages and their respective economic performances, however the data had been cherry picked and only 11 G20 economies had been included in the analysis. When all G20 economies were analyzed, no correlation existed. Treasury later withdrew the graph. IMF research showed statistically significant links between the form of stimulus, and the success or otherwise of various countries through the recession.

Notwithstanding this criticism, a raft of economic advice and analysis has subsequently supported Australia's actions. The OECD's 2009 employment outlook said that while "generally have not had a strong effect in cushioning the initial decline in employment caused by the crisis...Australia is a notable exception." Australia's unemployment figures remain about 3% lower than the OECD average, and it also avoided recession throughout the GFC.

Henry's advice throughout the GFC has been characterised as "within the mainstream of economic orthodoxy". As of December 2009, Australia's unemployment rate is thought to have peaked at 5.8 percent after several months of job growth. This is much lower than previous Treasury estimates of up to 8.5 percent.

=== Henry Tax Review ===
The Australian Government released the contents of the Henry Tax Review on 2 May 2010. The review proposed changes to superannuation, a resource rent tax on the mining sector and tax reform for small businesses. The Resource Super Profits Tax (RSPT) proposed by Henry proposed to tax the super profits of mining companies.

Following criticisms of the measures proposed in the Henry Tax Review, Henry said:

Whenever an idea is ventured publicly by a person, whether that person is a policy advisor or whether it's a government minister, there's at least a handful of academics who will contest it. I've seen it on both sides of politics - this is not a partisan comment at all - but for governments, government ministers who are seeking to get ideas legislated - it is unbelievably frustrating, incredibly frustrating. But I think there are occasions on which economists might, at least for a period, put down their weapons and join a consensus.

Henry was criticised for wanting to avoid debate of his ideas.

=== Resource Super Profits Tax ===
Ken Henry proposed a Resource Super Profits Tax (RSPT) on all mining companies' super profits. The government claimed that miners paid as little as 17 percent tax on their profits, mining companies claimed they paid 43%, but Australian Taxation Office figures indicate that "the average tax take across the mining industry is about 27 percent" with many paying much less than this.

During negotiations with mining companies, Henry advised that the initial estimates of A$12 billion had been revised up to A$24 billion due to higher commodity price estimates in the two months since the release of the initial RSPT proposal.

== Post-Treasury career ==
=== Special Adviser to the Prime Minister ===
On 1 June 2011, Prime Minister Julia Gillard announced Henry had been appointed by the Governor General as a Special Adviser on a part-time basis in her portfolio. He was directly appointed by the Governor General under section 67 of the Constitution of Australia, and outside the Public Service Act 1999.

==== "Australia in the Asian Century" ====
Henry led the writing of a White Paper on the topic "Australia in the Asian Century", publicly released in mid-2012. He was assisted by Professor Peter Drysdale, Catherine Livingstone, Chair of Telstra, and John Denton, CEO of Corrs Chambers Westgarth. Dr Gordon de Brouwer, Dr David Gruen, Deputy Secretary of the Department of the Treasury and Dr Heather Smith, Deputy Secretary of the Department of Foreign Affairs and Trade form a Secretariat.

=== National Australia Bank ===
Henry was appointed as an executive director of the National Australia Bank (NAB) in 2011; and in 2015 was appointed as chairman. Under Henry, NAB received the largest ever vote of 88.1 percent against its remuneration report.

Appearing before the Royal Commission into Misconduct in the Banking, Superannuation and Financial Services Industry in November 2018, Henry was defensive, with some tense exchanges with Counsel Assisting, Rowena Orr. In his final report, Royal Commissioner The Honourable Justice Kenneth Hayne AC QC singled out Henry and NAB for particular criticism:

NAB also stands apart from the other three major banks. ...I thought it telling that Dr Henry seemed unwilling to accept any criticism of how the board had dealt with some issues.

— Commissioner Hayne, Final Report: Royal Commission into Misconduct in the Banking, Superannuation and Financial Services Industry. 1 February 2019.

On 5 February 2019, NAB announced to the ASX that Henry acknowledged the Commissioner's comments and he seemed unwilling to accept criticism. He denied that this was the case. Two days later Henry announced that he would resign as chairman after overseeing the selection of his replacement.

=== Other ===
Henry was also appointed a director of the board of the Australian Securities Exchange in January 2013. He is chair of the Sir Roland Wilson Foundation Board at the Australian National University.

Henry is the part-time Executive Chair of the Australian National University's new Institute of Public Policy; and chair of the SMART Infrastructure Facility Advisory Council at the University of Wollongong.

Henry is chair of the Australian Climate and Biodiversity Foundation and in an address to the National Press Club in 2025 called for an overhaul of Australia's Environment Protection and Biodiversity Conservation Act.

=== Activism ===
In 2011, Henry joined the council of Voiceless, the animal protection institute. "There are few pursuits more noble in life than giving voice to those who would otherwise suffer in silence." He proudly proclaims his rural upbringing around Taree as contributing to his early realisation about the value of conservation and animal rights. He has a specific interest in the preservation of the endangered Hairy-nosed wombat.

== Awards and honours ==
In the 2007 Australia Day Honours list, Henry was appointed a Companion of the Order of Australia (AC) for service to the development and implementation of economic and taxation policy, to the finance sector through a range of banking and regulatory bodies, and to the community in the area of welfare and care of native wildlife, and received the Centenary Medal in 2001.

Government offices
Preceded by Ted Evans	Secretary of the Department of the Treasury; 2001–2011	Succeeded by Martin Parkinson
