= Denise Bradley =

Australian academic (1942–2020)

Denise Bradley AC

3rd Vice-Chancellor of the University of South Australia
- In office 1997–2007
- Chancellor: Basil Hetzel; David Klingberg
- Preceded by: David Antony Robinson
- Succeeded by: Peter Høj

Denise Irene Bradley AC (23 March 1942 – 20 March 2020) was an Australian higher education administrator with specialist interests in educational equity. She was known for the Bradley Review of Higher Education (2008).

== Professional career ==
Bradley began her career as a high school teacher, later coming to work across higher education administration, including working with various Australian universities and serving as a vice-chancellor and reviewer for the Commonwealth Government.

Bradley served on the Commonwealth Tertiary Education Commission in the 1980s, advising government on funding for universities.

Bradley was an influential figured in the early years of the University of South Australia. She was instrumental in amalgamating its predecessor organisations, chiefly the South Australian Institute of Technology and the South Australian College of Advanced Education. She later served as UniSA’s vice chancellor from 1997 to 2007.

In 2008 she led the Review of Higher Education in Australia which resulted in the demand driven system.

She was also actively involved in the Higher Education Council, the Australian Universities Quality Assurance and IDP Australia.

== Awards and honours ==
- 1995 Officer of the Order of Australia
- 2001 Centenary Medal
- 2005 South Australian of the Year
- 2007 Honorary Doctorate, University of South Australia
- 2008 Companion of the Order of Australia
- 2011 College Medal, Australian College of Educators
