= John A. Fraser (businessman) =

Australian public servant (born 1951)

John Fraser

Secretary of the Department of the Treasury
- In office 15 January 2015 – 31 July 2018
- Preceded by: Martin Parkinson
- Succeeded by: Philip Gaetjens

Personal details
- Born: John Arthur Fraser; 8 August 1951 (age 75) Armadale, Victoria, Australia
- Education: Monash University
- Occupation: Public servant, businessman

John Arthur Fraser (born 8 August 1951) is an Australian public servant. He commenced in his role as Secretary of the Department of the Treasury in January 2015, and announced his retirement in July 2018.

== Life and career ==
Fraser graduated from Monash University in Australia in 1972 with a first class honours degree in Economics. He worked for the Australian Treasury, including two international postings to Washington DC, firstly at the International Monetary Fund and then as Economic Minister at the Australian embassy. He was Deputy Secretary (Economic) of the Department of the Treasury.

Fraser joined the UBS Group in Australia in 1993 and was named Head of Asia Pacific for the Business Group in 1999. From 1994 to 1998 he was Executive Chairman and CEO of Swiss Bank Corporation's division SBC Australia Funds Management Ltd. He was Chairman and CEO of UBS Global Asset Management from December 2001 until December 2013. Prior to that, he was president and chief operating officer of UBS Asset Management and Head of Asia Pacific.

In December 2014, Prime Minister Tony Abbott announced John Fraser's appointment as Secretary of the Treasury Department, to commence 15 January 2015. The appointment is for five years. Treasurer Joe Hockey said that, in his new role, Fraser would be asked to undertake a thorough review of the Treasury Department's resources and capabilities. On 12 July 2018, Prime Minister Malcolm Turnbull announced that Fraser had resigned as Treasury Secretary, effective 31 July, and that he would be replaced by Philip Gaetjens.

Fraser was a member of the Board of Governors at the Marymount International School in Kingston-upon-Thames from 2007 to 2012.

Government offices
Preceded by Martin Parkinson	Secretary of the Department of the Treasury; 2015–2018	Succeeded by Philip Gaetjens
