= Department of Climate Change =

Australian government department, 2007–2010

Department overview
- Formed: 3 December 2007
- Dissolved: 8 March 2010
- Superseding Department: Department of Climate Change and Energy Efficiency
- Jurisdiction: Commonwealth of Australia
- Department executive: Martin Parkinson, Secretary
- Website: climatechange.gov.au

The Department of Climate Change was an Australian Government department that existed between 2007 and 2010.

== Operational activities ==
The functions of the department were broadly classified into the following matters:

- Development and co-ordination of domestic and international climate change policy
- International climate change negotiations
- Design and implementation of emissions trading
- Mandatory renewable energy target policy, regulation and co-ordination
- Greenhouse emissions and energy consumption reporting
- Climate change adaptation strategy and co-ordination
- Co-ordination of climate change science activities
- Renewable energy
- Energy efficiency
- Greenhouse gas abatement programs
- Community and household climate action
