= Bradley Review of Higher Education =

The Bradley Review of Higher Education was an independent review of Australian higher education initiated by the Australian Government in March 2008. The Bradley Review was to consider and report on the future direction of the higher education sector, its fitness for purpose in meeting the needs of the Australian community and economy, and seek recommendations for reform and continuing improvement. The Review was conducted by an independent expert panel and was led by Emeritus Professor Denise Bradley AC, reporting to Minister for Education, Employment, Workplace Relations and Social Inclusion, the Hon Julia Gillard in December 2008.

== The Discussion Paper and Consultation ==
A discussion paper, "Review of Australian Higher Education," was released in June 2008. The discussion paper set out the context of the higher education sector in a "modern Australia" including its role and functions, as well as the strategic context and key challenges and issues.

These key challenges and issues were set out as following:

1. Meeting labour market and industry needs
2. Opportunities to participate in higher education
3. The student experience of higher education
4. Connecting with other education and training sectors
5. Higher education's role in the national innovation system
6. Australia's higher education sector in the international arena
7. Higher education's contribution to Australia's economic, social and cultural capital
8. Resourcing the system
9. Governance and regulation

The paper included 35 consultation questions that stakeholders were invited to respond to. 450 formal submissions were received from universities, academics, peak bodies, students, unions, advocacy groups and other stakeholders.

== The Final Report ==
The final report, "Transforming Australia's Higher Education System", was released on 17 December 2008. The report found that higher education was crucial to Australia's future prosperity and that current rates of attainment were not sufficient to meet expected demand in the future. The report's key recommendations were that Australia set a target that 40 per cent of 25- to 34-year-old Australians have a university degree by 2020, and that the system of Commonwealth support for undergraduate domestic students be uncapped and follow the student, i.e. become "demand driven". This attracted a significant amount of media attention.

Such a system allows institutions flexibility to decide the courses they will offer and the number of students they will admit. This, combined with an entitlement for all qualified students, is the most responsive and appropriate policy option in circumstances where we must raise participation urgently and do so from among groups which have traditionally failed to participate. - Transforming Australia's Higher Education Sector, p.xiv

Other key recommendations were:

- additional higher targets for participation in higher education amongst students from low socio-economic backgrounds
- a massive upgrade of university and TAFE infrastructure
- establishing the Tertiary Education Quality and Standards Agency (TEQSA) to enhance quality and support accreditation
- increase student income support for students from low socio-economic backgrounds to better enable these students to access higher education
- additional support to regional tertiary education provision
- developing better pathways between the higher education and vocational education and training sectors

In the 2009 Budget, the Australian Government announced funds to support higher education and research over four years in a response to the Bradley Review, Transforming Australia's Higher Education System. The purpose of the funds allocation was to "support high quality teaching and learning, improve access and outcomes for students from low socio-economic backgrounds, build new links between universities and disadvantaged schools, reward institutions for meeting agreed quality and equity outcomes, improve resourcing for research and invest in world class tertiary education infrastructure".

== The Demand Driven System ==
Following the Bradley Review, the Gillard Government implemented the demand driven system where Commonwealth Supported Places for domestic students to study undergraduate degrees at Australian universities were uncapped. This means every domestic bachelor student that a university enrolled would trigger Commonwealth funding for that student place. Universities could now choose to enrol as many students as they wanted (and could attract) and continue receiving funding for each place, while prior to this they only received funding for places up to a cap. The demand driven system saw a rapid expansion in bachelor places being provided after its phase in between 2010 and 2012, before it was ended in 2018 by the Turnbull Government.

A Productivity Commission report in 2019 found it had a "mixed report card"; while it did allow a significant expansion in higher education provision especially for students from low socio-economic backgrounds, there was little improvement for regional or remote and Indigenous young people, and the additional students the system admitted dropped out at higher rates (21% of additional students had dropped out by age 23 compared to 12% of other students). The higher attrition rate was ascribed to poorer academic preparation and inadequate support for these additional students once they had commenced study.
