= Phil Gaetjens =

Former Australian public servant

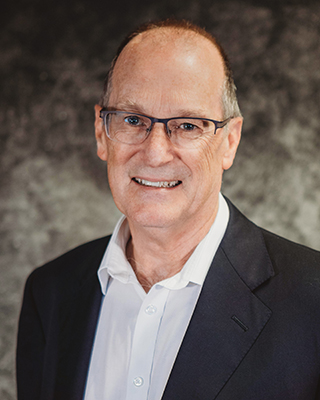

Secretary of the Department of the Prime Minister and Cabinet
- In office 2 September 2019 – 23 May 2022
- Prime Minister: Scott Morrison
- Preceded by: Martin Parkinson
- Succeeded by: Glyn Davis

Secretary of the Department of the Treasury
- In office 1 August 2018 – 2 September 2019
- Preceded by: John Fraser
- Succeeded by: Steven Kennedy

Personal details
- Born: Philip Gaetjens
- Education: Flinders University (BA); University of Canberra (GrDip)

Phil Gaetjens is an Australian public servant and former Liberal Party staffer, who served as the Secretary of the Department of the Prime Minister and Cabinet from 2019 to 2022.

== Education ==
Gaetjens earned a Bachelor of Arts from Flinders University and Graduate Diploma in Accounting from the University of Canberra.

== Career ==
Gaetjens began his career in government in 1977 as an Assistant Research Officer in the Bureau of Transport Economics. He moved to the Department of the Prime Minister and Cabinet in 1991 before becoming a Senior Adviser to Infrastructure Australia 1993. In 1994, he served as a Parliamentary Liaison Officer in the Australian Senate. He joined the South Australian Department of Treasury and Finance as Assistant Under Treasurer for State Enterprises in 1995. From 1997 to 2007, Gaetjens served as Chief of Staff to then-Treasurer Peter Costello. In 2008, Gaetjens became Chief Adviser in the Competition and Consumer Policy Division in the Treasury Department. Gaetjens later became Director of the Asia-Pacific Economic Cooperation Policy Support Unit before returning to Australia in 2010.

From 2015 to 2018, Gaetjens served as Chief of Staff to Scott Morrison. From 1 August 2018 to 2 September 2019, he served as Secretary of the Department of the Treasury. Gaetjens's nomination was criticised as an example of the politicisation of traditionally-nonpartisan government offices. He became Secretary of the Department of the Prime Minister and Cabinet on 2 September 2019, succeeding Martin Parkinson.

He was succeeded as Secretary by Professor Glyn Davis after the 2022 Australian federal election.

Gaetjens was criticised for his role in the Scott Morrison ministerial positions controversy. On 25 November 2022, the Bell Inquiry concluded that it was troubling that Gaetjens did not take up the issue of the secrecy surrounding the appointments with Mr Morrison and firmly argue for their disclosure.
