= Martin Parkinson =

Australian public servant

Martin Parkinson AC PSM
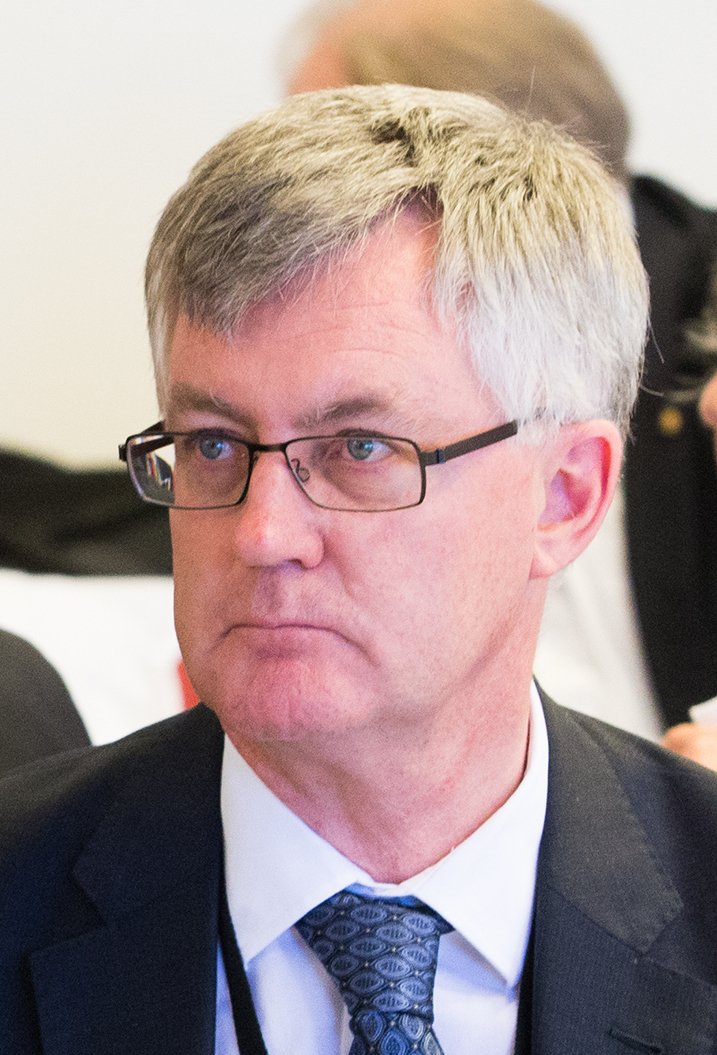
- Parkinson in 2015

Chancellor of Macquarie University
- Incumbent
- Assumed office 24 October 2019
- Preceded by: Michael Egan

Secretary of the Department of the Prime Minister and Cabinet
- In office 23 January 2016 – 30 August 2019
- Preceded by: Michael Thawley
- Succeeded by: Phil Gaetjens

Secretary of the Department of the Treasury
- In office 7 March 2011 – 12 December 2014
- Preceded by: Ken Henry
- Succeeded by: John Fraser

Secretary of the Department of Climate Change and Energy Efficiency
- In office 8 March 2010 – 7 March 2011
- Preceded by: New department
- Succeeded by: Blair Comley

Secretary of the Department of Climate Change
- In office 3 December 2007 – 8 March 2010
- Preceded by: New department
- Succeeded by: Department abolished

Personal details
- Born: Martin Lee Parkinson; 26 September 1958 (age 68) Stawell, Victoria, Australia
- Spouse: Heather Smith
- Education: University of Adelaide; Australian National University; Princeton University
- Profession: Public Servant and Economist

Martin Lee Parkinson AC PSM (born 26 September 1958) is a senior Australian public servant. He was Secretary of the Department of the Treasury between March 2011 and December 2014. On 3 December 2015 it was announced that he would return to the public service as Secretary of the Department of Prime Minister and Cabinet. He retired from the position on 30 August 2019 and was replaced by Phil Gaetjens, former chief of staff to Prime Minister Scott Morrison. Parkinson has served as the Chancellor of Macquarie University since 2019.

== Life and career ==
Parkinson graduated with honours from the University of Adelaide with a Bachelor of Economics. He completed his master's degree in economics at the Australian National University in 1983 and his Master of Arts in 1988, also at the Australian National University. He completed his Ph.D. in 1990 at Princeton University.

Parkinson has previously served as the inaugural secretary of the Department of Climate Change, an International Monetary Fund official, and an advisor to former Australian Treasurer, John Dawkins.

Between 2011 and 2015, Parkinson was secretary of the Department of the Treasury.

In late October 2019, Parkinson was elected chancellor at Macquarie University.

== Awards ==
Parkinson was awarded the Public Service Medal on 26 January 2008. He was also a recipient of the inaugural Australian National University Alumnus of the Year Award on 9 March 2013. In 2017 Parkinson was appointed a Companion of the Order of Australia for eminent service to the Australian community through leadership in public sector roles, to innovative government administration and high level program delivery, to the development of economic policy, and to climate change strategy.

== Notes ==
Government offices
| New title Department established | Secretary of the Department of Climate Change; 2007–2010 | Succeeded by Himself as Secretary of the Department of Climate Change and Energy Efficiency |
| Preceded by Himself as Secretary of the Department of Climate Change | Secretary of the Department of Climate Change and Energy Efficiency; 2010–2011 | Succeeded by Blair Comley |
| Preceded by Ken Henry | Secretary of the Department of the Treasury; 2011–2014 | Succeeded by John Fraser |
| Preceded by Michael Thawley | Secretary of the Department of the Prime Minister and Cabinet; 2016–2019 | Succeeded by Phil Gaetjens |
Academic offices
| Preceded by Michael Egan | Chancellor of Macquarie University; 2019–present | Incumbent |
