= Minerals Resource Rent Tax =

Tax formerly imposed by the government of Australia

The Minerals Resource Rent Tax (MRRT) was a resource rent tax formerly imposed by the government of Australia on profits generated from the mining of non-renewable resources in Australia. It was a replacement for the proposed Resource Super Profit Tax (RSPT).

The tax, levied on 30% of the "super profits" from the mining of iron ore and coal in Australia, was introduced on 1 July 2012. A company was to pay the tax when its annual profits reach $75 million, a measure designed so as not to burden small business. The original threshold was to be $50 million until independent MP Andrew Wilkie negotiated an amendment. Around 320 companies would have potentially been affected by the changes.

The Coalition, led by Tony Abbott, went to the 2010 and 2013 elections promising to repeal the tax. The Coalition won the 2013 election, and repealed the tax in 2014. A January 2014 poll conducted by UMR Research, however, found that a majority of Australians still think that multinational mining companies do not pay enough tax. Supporters of the tax also point to continually-large profits produced by Australian-based mining operations, 83% of which are foreign-owned.

== Introduction ==
=== Background ===
The RSPT was initially announced as part of the initial response to the Australia's Future Tax System review, known as the Henry Tax Review, by the Treasurer, Wayne Swan and Prime Minister, Kevin Rudd. The tax was similar in concept, although different in operation, to the existing Petroleum Resource Rent Tax levied on off-shore petroleum extraction activities. The Petroleum Resource Rent Tax is to be extended to all Australian onshore and offshore oil and gas projects as part of the new framework.

The RSPT was to be levied at 40% and applied to all extractive industry including gold, nickel and uranium mining as well as sand and quarrying activities. The tax was replaced by the MRRT following the appointment of Julia Gillard as Prime Minister in late June 2010. Gillard made implementation of the tax her first priority.

The controversy regarding the RSPT was such that an "ad war" between the government and mining interests began in May 2010 and continued until the downfall of Prime Minister Kevin Rudd in June 2010. The Australian Electoral Commission released figures indicating mining interests had spent $22 m in campaigning and advertisements in the six weeks prior to the end of the Rudd prime ministership. Mining interests re-introduced the advertisements arguing against the proposed revised changes during the 2010 federal election campaign.

=== Mining industry and political response ===
The response to the MRRT was mostly divided into supporter and opposition groups consisting of Federal government and opposition parties, lobby groups and the various stakeholders.

The tax received support from the Australian Council of Trade Unions, mining unions such as the Construction, Forestry, Mining and Energy Union and conditional support from the Australian Greens. Unlike the RSPT, mining companies BHP Billiton and Rio Tinto did not publicly oppose the MRRT. Those opposing the tax included the mining industry, resource and mining organisations such as Fortescue Metals Group, Xstrata and Hancock Prospecting, mining lobby groups, being mainly led by the Association of Mining and Exploration Companies (AMEC) and the federal opposition (Liberal Party and National Party). Andrew Forrest stated that the tax would reduce investment in Australia. Mining magnate Gina Rinehart, listed by Forbes Australia in 2011 as Australia's wealthiest person, was a fierce opponent of the tax, arguing that it would drive away billions of dollars of investment.

Advertisements supporting or attacking the proposed tax ran on commercial television and in major newspapers. Funding for the mining lobby's advertisements came from the largest resource companies while funding for the Federal government's advertisements came from consolidated revenue. Julia Gillard ceased the government's advertising after becoming prime minister and the mining lobby ended its ads shortly thereafter.

=== Passing of the Bill ===
On 23 November 2011 the tax passed through the lower house with the support of the Greens and Wilkie. Independent MP Tony Windsor supported the Bill on the condition that a committee be set up to independently assess the environmental risks posed by coal seam gas extraction.

The tax was passed by the Senate on 19 March 2012 by 38 votes to 32, with support of the Greens.

== Levy ==
The tax was calculated separately for each mining project interest, according to the formula

$MRRT = A(B-C) - D - E$

where

- MRRT = MRRT liability (which cannot be less than nil)
- A = MRRT rate
- B = mining profits
- C = MRRT allowances
- D = low profit offset
- E = rehabilitation tax offsets

=== Rate ===
The tax was initially set at 22.5%, based on the formula above.

$\text{MRRT rate} = 30\%( 1 - \text{Extraction factor})$

where the extraction factor is set at 25%.

=== Profits and allowances ===
Where a mining project interest's mining profit was negative, it was deemed to be nil for MRRT purposes.

Allowances were available for deduction against mining profits in the following order:

1. Royalty allowance
2. Transferred royalty allowance
3. Pre‑mining loss allowance
4. Mining loss allowance
5. Starting base allowance
6. Transferred pre‑mining loss allowance
7. Transferred mining loss allowance

Additional compliance costs for the mining sector reportedly ran into millions of dollars.

=== Low-profit offset ===
Where the miner had a group profit of less than $125 million, a low profit offset was available so that:

- MRRT liability was nil where the group mining profit was less than $75 million
- where the group mining profit was between $75 million and $125 million, a special calculation was used for determining the miner's liability, allocating group profits and allowances

=== Rehabilitation tax offset ===
Where a mining project interest or pre‑mining project interest was winding down or had ended, a rehabilitation tax offset may have arisen if upstream rehabilitation expenditure had occurred that would not otherwise have been taken into account in determining MRRT liability.

== Expected impact ==
A total of $22.5 billion was expected to have been raised over the first four years of the tax, which would have been spent on pensions, tax cuts for small businesses and infrastructure projects, particularly in Queensland and Western Australia.

Opposition to the tax was cited by some commentators as one reason for the replacement in June 2010 of the then prime minister, Kevin Rudd by his then deputy, Gillard. Soon after the latter's appointment as leader, the government reached an agreement with several of the largest mining firms, including BHP Billiton, Xstrata and Rio Tinto, on changes that were announced on 2 July 2010. Negotiations with smaller companies did not take place at this time.

The changes led to a reduction in the amount of revenue expected to be raised by the tax and offsetting reductions in the tax breaks the MRRT would have funded, for example; the proposed company tax cut was halved due to the reduction in revenue to be collected from the tax, along with reductions in other areas.

== Actual revenue ==
In May 2012 budget, the government said was the tax would bring in $3 billion for the financial year. In October 2012, the figure was reduced to $2 billion, while on 14 May 2013, it was announced that the receipts were expected to be less than $200 million.

On 12 February 2013, Rudd, one of the authors of the tax, stated that "Wayne Swan and Julia Gillard must bear the responsibility for Labor's mining tax and deal with the consequences [of] its near non-existent revenue" as the expected revenue has not materialised. It raised $126 million in the first six months since its introduction.

On 16 August 2013, the Treasury and Finance departments' pre-election Economic and Fiscal Outlook forecast an increase in forecasts for tax receipts over the next four years to almost $6 billion, $16.5 billion below its original projection. The government is paying back several of pre-payments already made for this tax.

The tax also proved to be complex and expensive to operate. It cost more than $50 million to set up, with estimated running costs of $20 million a year. Advertising came to nearly $40 million.

== Constitutionality ==
In 2012, Fortescue Metals Group and several of its subsidiaries launched a lawsuit challenging the tax's validity under the Constitution of Australia. On 7 August 2013, the High Court of Australia unanimously rejected the claim, declaring that the tax did not:

- discriminate between the states contrary to s. 51(ii),
- give preference to one state over another contrary to s.99,
- prevent the states from aiding mining activity under s.91, or
- curtail state sovereignty contrary to the Melbourne Corporation principle.

== Repeal effort ==
The Coalition had promised at the 2010 and 2013 elections to repeal the tax. After winning the 2013 election, it introduced the Mining Tax Repeal Bill. After failing once, and following Coalition negotiations with the Palmer United Party, the bill passed both houses of Parliament on 2 September 2014, and received Royal assent on 5 September 2014. Its implementation took place over several dates:

MRRT and related amendments and repeals
Schedule	Description	Effective date
1	Minerals resource rent tax	30 September 2014
2	Loss carry back	30 September 2014
3	Small business instant asset write‑off threshold	30 September 2014
4	Deductions for motor vehicles	30 September 2014
5	Geothermal energy	30 September 2014
6	Superannuation Guarantee Charge percentage	5 September 2014
7	Low income superannuation contribution	1 July 2017
8, items 1–11	Repeal of income support bonus (main amendments)	31 December 2016
8, items 12–13	Repeal of income support bonus (amendments to Farm Household Support (Consequential and Transitional Provisions) Act 2014)	5 September 2014
8, items 15–26	Repeal of income support bonus (other amendments and savings)	31 December 2016
9, Part 1A	Schoolkids bonus (amendments)	5 September 2014
9, Parts 1 and 2	Schoolkids bonus (repeals and savings)	31 December 2016

== See also ==
- Mining in Australia
- Petroleum Revenue Tax, a direct tax collected in the United Kingdom
