= Department of Education, Skills and Employment =

Australian government department, 2020–2022

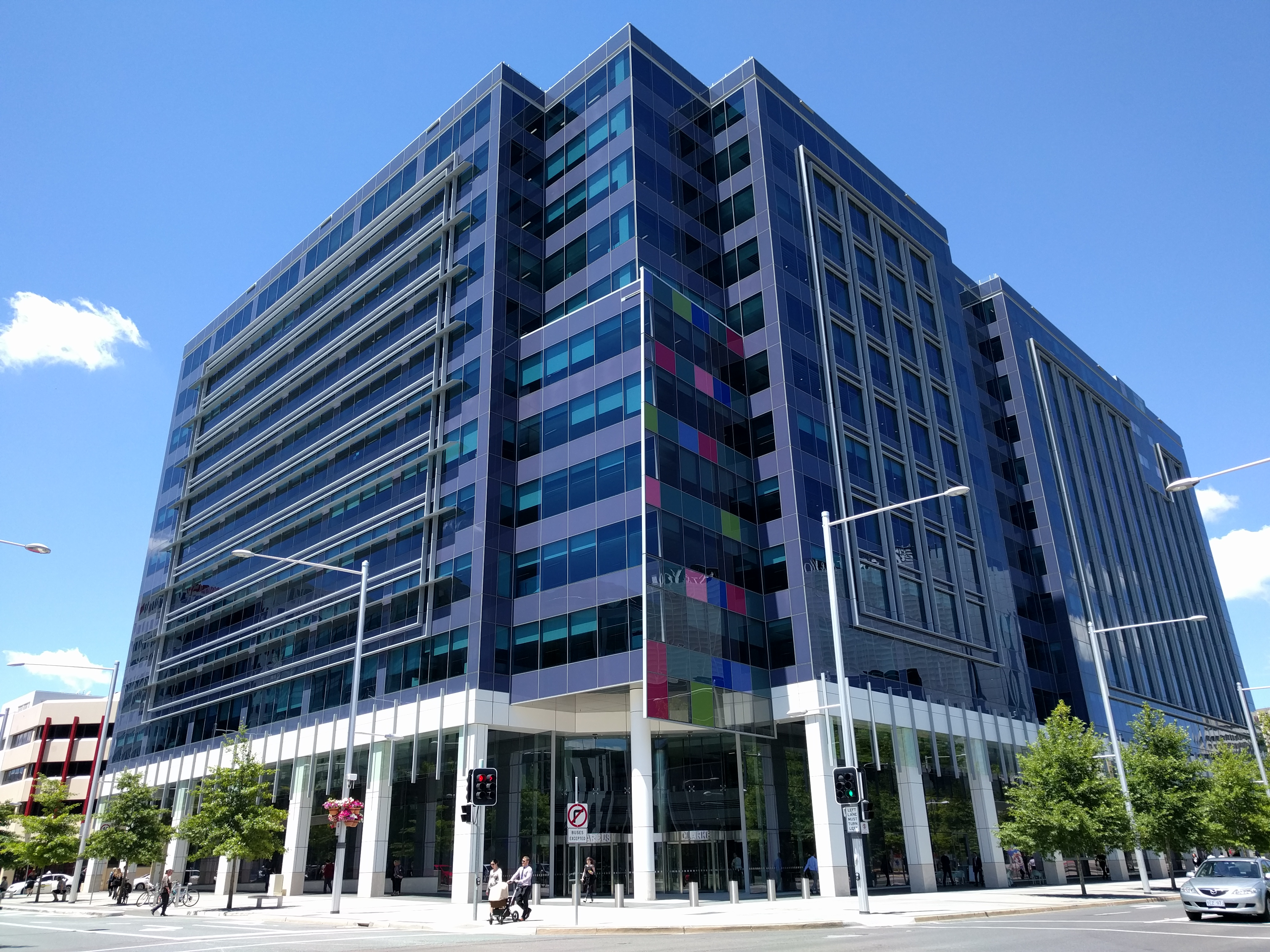
- The national office of the Department of Education, Skills and Employment, 50 Marcus Clarke Street, Canberra.

Department overview
- Formed: 1 February 2020
- Preceding agencies: Department of Education; Department of Employment, Skills, Small and Family Business
- Dissolved: 1 July 2022
- Superseding agencies: Department of Education; Department of Employment and Workplace Relations
- Jurisdiction: Commonwealth of Australia
- Headquarters: Canberra
- Employees: 3,655 (2021)
- Annual budget: A$60.437 billion (2021)
- Ministers responsible: Jason Clare, Minister for Education; Tony Burke, Minister for Employment; Brendan O'Connor, Minister for Skills and Training
- Department executive: Michele Bruniges, Secretary (2020–2022)
- Child Department: Shared Services Centre
- Website: dese.gov.au

The Australian Department of Education, Skills and Employment (DESE) was a department of the Government of Australia, existing between 1 February 2020 to 1 July 2022 from a merger of the Department of Education (2019–2020) and Department of Employment, Skills, Small and Family Business. It was superseded by the Department of Education and Department of Employment and Workplace Relations.

The department "works to ensure Australians can experience the wellbeing and economic benefits that quality education, skills and employment provide." Its primary focus was "to equip Australians — at all life and career stages — with knowledge, skills and attributes to live well, thrive at work and contribute to community life."

The head of the department was the Secretary of DESE, at dissolution Dr Michele Bruniges AM, who reported to the Minister for Education, at dissolution the Hon. Jason Clare MP; the Minister for Employment, at dissolution the Hon. Tony Burke MP; and the Minister for Skills and Training, at dissolution the Hon. Brendan O'Connor MP.

== History ==
The department was formed by way of an Administrative Arrangements Order issued on 5 December 2019, effective from 1 February 2020. It was merged from the:

- Department of Education
- Department of Employment, Skills, Small and Family Business (except small business functions)

=== Preceding departments ===
The DESE's predecessor education departments have been:

- Department of Education and Science (13 December 1966 – 19 December 1972)
- Department of Education (19 December 1972 – 11 March 1983)
- Department of Education and Youth Affairs (11 March 1983 – 13 December 1984)
- Department of Education (13 December 1984 – 24 July 1987)
- Department of Employment, Education and Training (DEET) (24 July 1987 – 11 March 1996)
- Department of Employment, Education, Training and Youth Affairs (DEETYA) (11 March 1996 – 21 October 1998)
- Department of Education, Training and Youth Affairs (DETYA) (21 October 1998 – 26 November 2001)
- Department of Education, Science and Training (DEST) (26 November 2001 – 3 December 2007)
- Department of Education, Employment and Workplace Relations (DEEWR) (3 December 2007 – 18 September 2013)
- Department of Education (18 September 2013 – 23 December 2014)
- Department of Education and Training (23 December 2014 – 29 May 2019)
- Department of Education (29 May 2019 – 1 February 2020)

The DESE's predecessor employment departments have been:

- Department of Labor and Immigration (12 June 1974 – 22 December 1975)
- Department of Employment and Industrial Relations (22 December 1975 – 5 December 1978)
- Department of Employment and Youth Affairs (5 December 1978 – 7 May 1982)
- Department of Employment and Industrial Relations (7 May 1982 – 24 July 1987)
- Department of Employment, Education and Training (24 July 1987 – 11 March 1996)
- Department of Employment, Education, Training and Youth Affairs (11 March 1996 – 21 October 1998)
- Department of Employment, Workplace Relations and Small Business (21 October 1998 – 26 November 2001)
- Department of Employment and Workplace Relations (26 November 2001 – 3 December 2007)
- Department of Education, Employment and Workplace Relations (3 December 2007 – 18 September 2013)
- Department of Employment (18 September 2013 - 20 December 2017)
- Department of Jobs and Small Business (20 December 2017 – 29 May 2019)
- Department of Employment, Skills, Small and Family Business (29 May 2019 – 1 February 2020)

== Operational activities ==
The functions of the department were broadly classified into the following matters:

- Employment policy, including employment services
- Jobactive
- Labour market programmes for people of working age
- Co-ordination of labour market research
- Equal employment opportunity
- Work and family programmes
- Participation, activity test and compliance policy for participation payment recipients
- Reducing the burden of government regulation
- Skills and vocational education policy regulation and programmes, including vocational education and training in schools
- Training, including apprenticeships and training and skills assessment services
- Training transitions policy and programmes
- Foundation skills for adults
- Schools education policy and programmes
- Education transitions policy and programmes
- Pre-school education policy and programmes
- Higher education policy, regulation and programmes
- Policy, coordination and support for international education and research engagement
- Co-ordination of research policy in relation to universities
- Creation and development of research infrastructure
- Research grants and fellowships
- Childcare policy and programmes
- Co-ordination of early childhood development policy and responsibilities

== See also ==
- Minister for Education (Australia)
- List of Australian Commonwealth Government entities
- Education in Australia
