= Department of Education (Australia) =

Australian Government Department

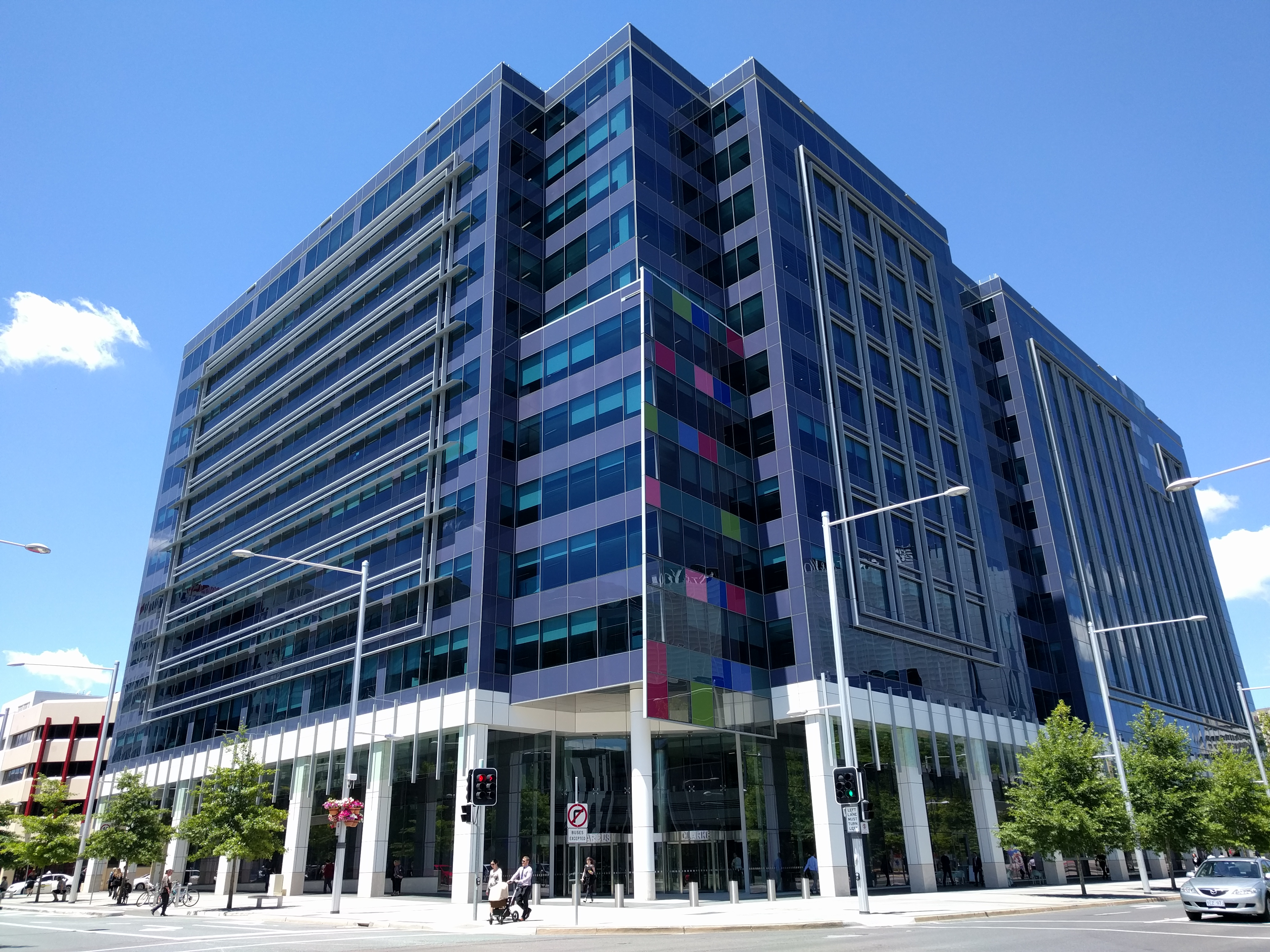
- The national office of the Department of Education, 50 Marcus Clarke Street, Canberra.

Department overview
- Formed: 1 July 2022
- Preceding Department: Department of Education, Skills and Employment
- Jurisdiction: Commonwealth of Australia
- Headquarters: Canberra
- Ministers responsible: Jason Clare, Minister for Education; Jess Walsh, Minister for Early Childhood Education, Minister for Youth
- Department executive: Tony Cook, Secretary (2023–present)
- Child agencies: Australian Research Council; Australian Qualifications Framework; Shared Services Centre
- Website: www.education.gov.au

The Department of Education is a department of the Government of Australia formed on 1 July 2022.

== History ==
The department was formed by way of an Administrative Arrangements Order issued on 1 June 2022. It split the preceding Department of Education, Skills and Employment into the newly formed Department of Education and Department of Employment and Workplace Relations.

=== Preceding departments ===
The Department of Education's predecessor departments have been:

- Department of Education and Science (13 December 1966 – 19 December 1972)
- Department of Education (19 December 1972 – 11 March 1983)
- Department of Education and Youth Affairs (11 March 1983 – 13 December 1984)
- Department of Education (13 December 1984 – 24 July 1987)
- Department of Employment, Education and Training (DEET) (24 July 1987 – 11 March 1996)
- Department of Employment, Education, Training and Youth Affairs (DEETYA) (11 March 1996 – 21 October 1998)
- Department of Education, Training and Youth Affairs (DETYA) (21 October 1998 – 26 November 2001)
- Department of Education, Science and Training (DEST) (26 November 2001 – 3 December 2007)
- Department of Education, Employment and Workplace Relations (DEEWR) (3 December 2007 – 18 September 2013)
- Department of Education (18 September 2013 – 23 December 2014)
- Department of Education and Training (23 December 2014 – 29 May 2019)
- Department of Education (29 May 2019 – 1 February 2020)
- Department of Education, Skills and Employment (DESE) (1 February 2020 – 1 July 2022)

== Operational activities ==
In an Administrative Arrangements Order made on 13 May 2025, the functions of the department were broadly classified into the following matters:

- Schools education policy and programmes
- Education transitions policy and programmes
- Youth affairs and programmes, including youth transitions
- Pre-school education policy and programmes
- Higher education policy, regulation and programmes
- Policy, coordination and support for international education and research engagement
- Co-ordination of research policy in relation to universities
- Creation and development of research infrastructure
- Research grants and fellowships
- Early childhood education and care policy and programmes

== See also ==
- Minister for Education (Australia)
- List of Australian Commonwealth Government entities
- Education in Australia
