= Department of Education (Australia, 2019–2020) =

Australian Government Department

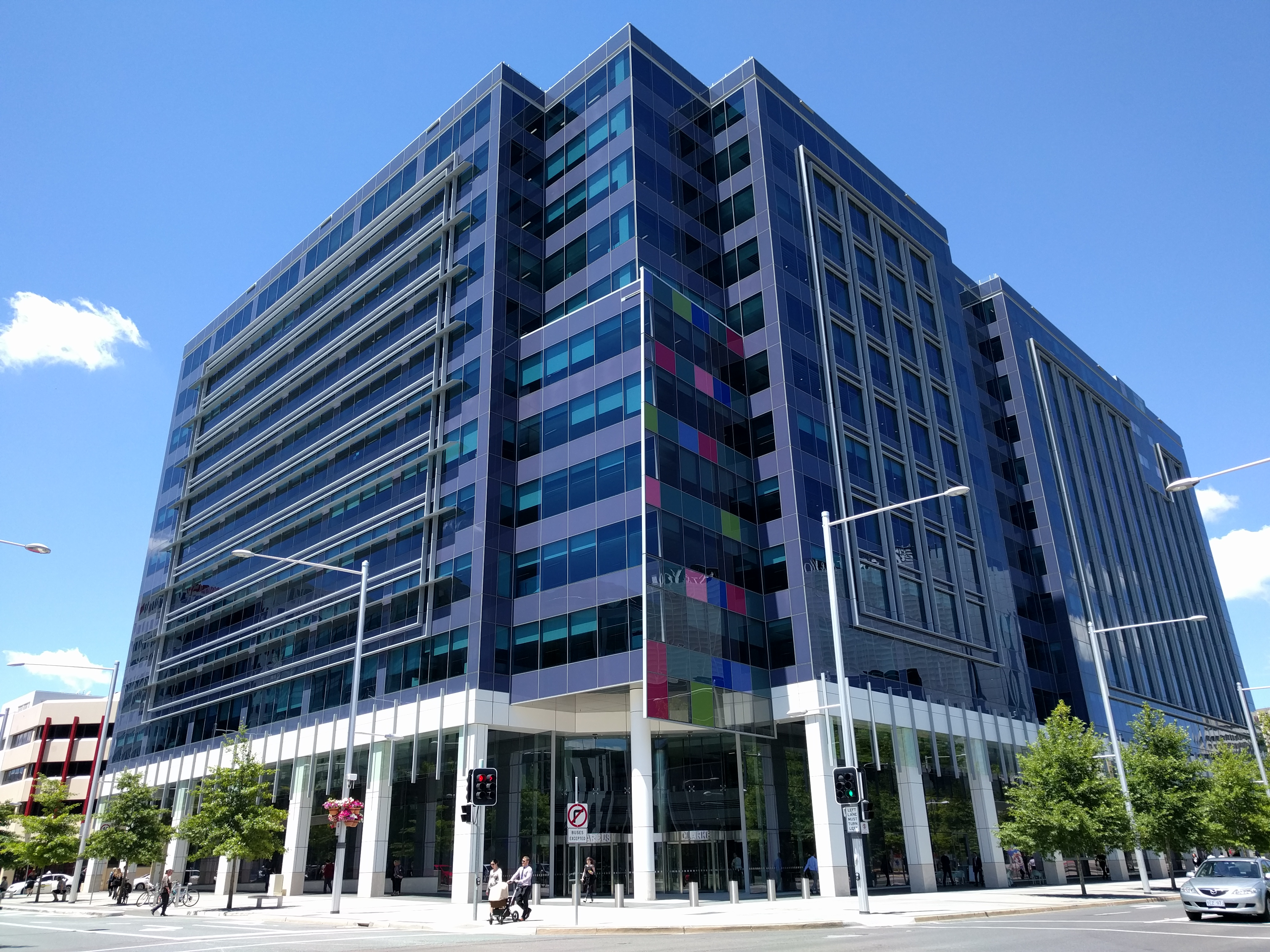
- The national office of the Department of Education, 50 Marcus Clarke Street, Canberra.

Department overview
- Formed: 29 May 2019
- Preceding Department: Department of Education and Training
- Dissolved: 1 February 2020
- Superseding Department: Department of Education, Skills and Employment
- Jurisdiction: Commonwealth of Australia
- Headquarters: Canberra
- Minister responsible: Dan Tehan, Minister for Education
- Department executive: Michele Bruniges, Secretary (2019–2020)
- Child Department: Shared Services Centre
- Website: www.education.gov.au

The Australian Department of Education was a short-lived department of the Government of Australia in existence between 29 May 2019 and 1 February 2020. It was charged with the responsibility for national policies and programs that help Australians access quality and affordable early childhood education, school education, higher education, vocational education and training, international education and academic research.

The head of the department was the Secretary of the Department of Education, Dr Michele Bruniges AM, who reported to the Minister for Education, the Hon. Dan Tehan MP.

The department merged with the Department of Employment, Skills, Small and Family Business (except small business functions) to form the Department of Education, Skills and Employment on 1 February 2020.

== History ==
The department was formed by way of an Administrative Arrangements Order issued on 29 May 2019. It incorporated the functions of the previous Department of Education and Training, with the exception that:

- vocational education and training and apprenticeships transferred to the Department of Employment, Skills, Small and Family Business; and
- migrant adult education transferred to the Department of Home Affairs.

On 1 February 2020, the department merged with the Department of Employment, Skills, Small and Family Business, excluding the latter's small business functions, to form the Department of Education, Skills and Employment.

=== Preceding departments ===
The Department of Education's predecessor departments have been:

- Department of Education and Science (13 December 1966 – 19 December 1972)
- Department of Education (19 December 1972 – 11 March 1983)
- Department of Education and Youth Affairs (11 March 1983 – 13 December 1984)
- Department of Education (13 December 1984 – 24 July 1987)
- Department of Employment, Education and Training (DEET) (24 July 1987 – 11 March 1996)
- Department of Employment, Education, Training and Youth Affairs (DEETYA) (11 March 1996 – 21 October 1998)
- Department of Education, Training and Youth Affairs (DETYA) (21 October 1998 – 26 November 2001)
- Department of Education, Science and Training (DEST) (26 November 2001 – 3 December 2007)
- Department of Education, Employment and Workplace Relations (DEEWR) (3 December 2007 – 18 September 2013)
- Department of Education (18 September 2013 – 23 December 2014)
- Department of Education and Training (23 December 2014 – 29 May 2019)

== Operational activities ==
The functions of the department were broadly classified into the following matters:

- Schools education policy and programs, including vocational education and training in schools
- Schooling transitions policy and programs including career pathways
- Education and training transitions policy and programs
- Youth affairs and programs, including youth transitions
- Pre-school education policy and programs
- Higher education policy, regulation and programs
- Policy, coordination and support for international education and research engagement
- Coordination of research policy in relation to universities
- Creation and development of research infrastructure
- Research grants and fellowships
- Childcare policy and programmes
- Co-ordination of early childhood development policy and responsibilities

== See also ==
- Minister for Education (Australia)
- List of Australian Commonwealth Government entities
- Education in Australia
