= Department of Employment and Workplace Relations =

Australian government department, 2022-

Department overview
- Formed: 1 July 2022
- Preceding Department: Department of Education, Skills and Employment
- Jurisdiction: Commonwealth of Australia
- Ministers responsible: Amanda Rishworth, Minister for Employment and Workplace Relations; Andrew Giles, Minister for Skills and Training
- Department executive: Simon Duggan, Secretary (2026–present)
- Website: dewr.gov.au

The Department of Employment and Workplace Relations (also called DEWR) is an Australian government department formed on 1 July 2022.

== History ==
The department was formed by way of an Administrative Arrangements Order issued on 1 June 2022. It split the preceding Department of Education, Skills and Employment into the newly formed Department of Education and Department of Employment and Workplace Relations

=== Preceding departments ===
- Department of Labor and Immigration (12 June 1974 – 22 December 1975)
- Department of Employment and Industrial Relations (22 December 1975 – 5 December 1978)
- Department of Employment and Youth Affairs (5 December 1978 – 7 May 1982)
- Department of Employment and Industrial Relations (7 May 1982 – 24 July 1987)
- Department of Employment, Education and Training (24 July 1987 – 11 March 1996)
- Department of Employment, Education, Training and Youth Affairs (11 March 1996 – 21 October 1998)
- Department of Employment, Workplace Relations and Small Business (21 October 1998 – 26 November 2001)
- Department of Employment and Workplace Relations (26 November 2001 – 3 December 2007)
- Department of Education, Employment and Workplace Relations (3 December 2007 – 18 September 2013)
- Department of Employment (18 September 2013 – 20 December 2017)
- Department of Jobs and Small Business (20 December 2017 – 29 May 2019)
- Department of Employment, Skills, Small and Family Business (29 May 2019 – 1 February 2020)
- Department of Education, Skills and Employment (1 February 2020 – 1 July 2022)

== Operational activities ==
In an Administrative Arrangements Order made on 13 May 2025, the functions of the department were broadly classified into the following matters:

- Employment policy, including employment services
- Labour market programmes for people of working age
- Co-ordination of labour market research
- Equal employment opportunity
- Work and family programmes
- Participation, activity test and compliance policy for participation payment recipients
- Work health and safety, rehabilitation and compensation
- Workplace relations policy development, advocacy and implementation
- Skills and vocational education policy regulation and programmes, including vocational education and training in schools
- Training, including apprenticeships and training and skills assessment services
- Training transitions policy and programmes
- Foundation skills for adults
- Careers policy and advice

== See also ==
- Fair Work Commission
- Fair Work Ombudsman
