= Department of Education and Training (Australia) =

Australian government department, 2014–2019

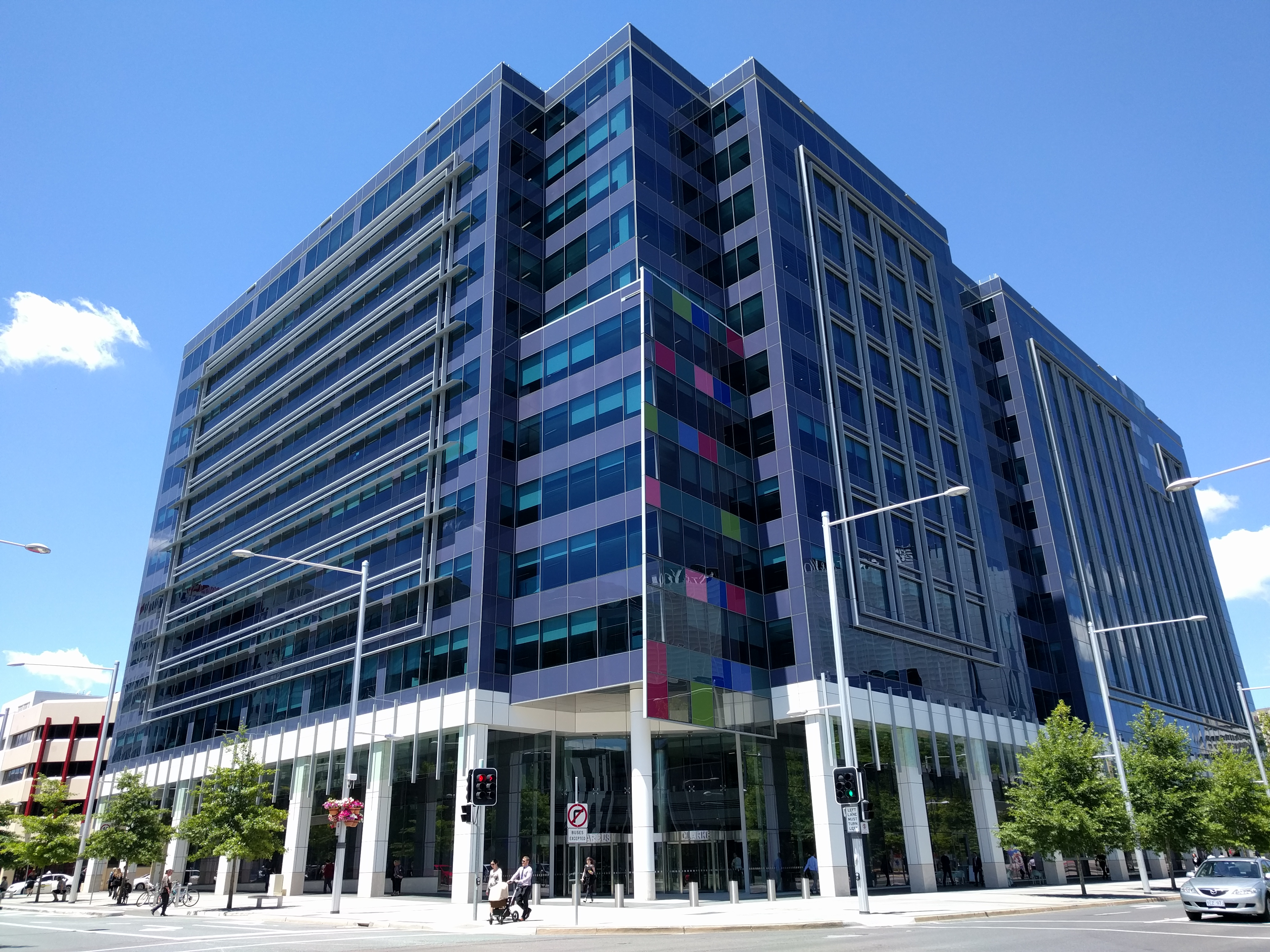
- The national office of the Department of Education and Training, 50 Marcus Clarke Street, Canberra.

Department overview
- Formed: 23 December 2014
- Preceding Department: Department of Education
- Dissolved: 29 May 2019
- Superseding Department: Department of Education
- Jurisdiction: Commonwealth of Australia
- Headquarters: Canberra
- Minister responsible: Dan Tehan, Minister for Education
- Department executive: Michele Bruniges, Secretary (since 4 April 2016)
- Child Department: Shared Services Centre
- Website: www.education.gov.au

The Australian Department of Education and Training was a former department of the Government of Australia that was in existence between 2014 and 2019 and which was charged with the responsibility for national policies and programs that help Australians access quality and affordable early childhood education, school education, higher education, vocational education and training, international education and academic research.

The head of the department was the Secretary of the Department of Education and Training, Michele Bruniges, who reported to the Minister for Education and Training, the Hon. Dan Tehan MP.

== History ==
The department was formed by way of an Administrative Arrangements Order issued on 23 December 2014. It incorporated the functions of the previous Department of Education, except for child care which was transferred to the Department of Social Services. Vocational training was transferred from the Department of Industry to the new Department of Education and Training.

Following the re-election of Scott Morrison's Government in 2019, through an Administrative Arrangements Order issued on 29 May 2019. the department was largely replaced by the Department of Education, with the following changes:

- vocational education and training and apprenticeships transferred to the Department of Employment, Skills, Small and Family Business; and
- migrant adult education transferred to the Department of Home Affairs.

=== Preceding departments ===
The Department of Education and Training's predecessor departments have been:

- Department of Education and Science (13 December 1966 – 19 December 1972)
- Department of Education (19 December 1972 – 11 March 1983)
- Department of Education and Youth Affairs (11 March 1983 – 13 December 1984)
- Department of Education (13 December 1984 – 24 July 1987)
- Department of Employment, Education and Training (DEET) (24 July 1987 – 11 March 1996)
- Department of Employment, Education, Training and Youth Affairs (DEETYA) (11 March 1996 – 21 October 1998)
- Department of Education, Training and Youth Affairs (DETYA) (21 October 1998 – 26 November 2001)
- Department of Education, Science and Training (DEST) (26 November 2001 – 3 December 2007)
- Department of Education, Employment and Workplace Relations (DEEWR) (3 December 2007 – 18 September 2013)
- Department of Education (18 September 2013 – 23 December 2014)

== Operational activities ==
The functions of the department are broadly classified into the following matters:

- Schools education policy and programs, including vocational education and training in schools
- Schooling transitions policy and programs including career pathways
- Education and training transitions policy and programs
- Youth affairs and programs, including youth transitions
- Pre-school education policy and programs
- Higher education policy, regulation and programs
- Policy, coordination and support for international education and research engagement
- Coordination of research policy in relation to universities
- Creation and development of research infrastructure
- Research grants and fellowships
- Skills and vocational education policy regulation and programs
- Training (including apprenticeships) and training and skills assessment services
- Foundation skills for adults
- Adult migrant education

== See also ==
- Minister for Education (Australia)
- List of Australian Commonwealth Government entities
- Education in Australia
