= Department of Jobs and Small Business (Australia) =

Australian government department, 2017–2019

Department overview
- Formed: 20 December 2017
- Preceding Department: Department of Employment
- Dissolved: 29 May 2019
- Superseding agencies: Department of Employment, Skills, Small and Family Business (Employment); Attorney-General's Department (Industrial Relations)
- Jurisdiction: Commonwealth of Australia
- Annual budget: $1.951 billion (2014–15)
- Minister responsible: Kelly O'Dwyer, Minister for Jobs and Industrial Relations
- Department executive: Kerri Hartland, Secretary
- Website: www.employment.gov.au

The Australian Department of Jobs and Small Business was a department of the Government of Australia charged with the responsibility for employment, job services and the labour market, workplace relations, small business, and deregulation. The Department was established on the 20 December 2017, and was part of the larger Jobs and Innovation portfolio which also includes the Department of Industry, Innovation and Science which reported to the Minister for Jobs and Industrial Relations, the Hon Kelly O'Dwyer MP. The final head of the department was the Secretary of the Department of Jobs and Small Business, Kerri Hartland.

On 29 May 2019, the Employment and Industrial Relations portfolios were split, with responsibility for Industrial Relations transferring to the Attorney-General's Department and reporting to the Australian Attorney-General, the Hon Christian Porter MP, and the employment portfolio becoming the Department of Employment, Skills, Small and Family Business, under Senator the Hon Michaelia Cash.

== History ==
The department was formed by way of an Administrative Arrangements Order issued on 20 December 2017 and replaced the functions previously performed by the Department of Employment which was formed in 2013.

=== Preceding departments ===
- Department of Labor and Immigration (12 June 1974 – 22 December 1975)
- Department of Employment and Industrial Relations (22 December 1975 – 5 December 1978)
- Department of Employment and Youth Affairs (5 December 1978 – 7 May 1982)
- Department of Employment and Industrial Relations (7 May 1982 – 24 July 1987)
- Department of Employment, Education and Training (24 July 1987 – 11 March 1996)
- Department of Employment, Education, Training and Youth Affairs (11 March 1996 – 21 October 1998)
- Department of Employment, Workplace Relations and Small Business (21 October 1998 – 26 November 2001)
- Department of Employment and Workplace Relations (26 November 2001 – 3 December 2007)
- Department of Education, Employment and Workplace Relations (3 December 2007 – 18 September 2013)
- Department of Employment (18 September 2013 - 20 December 2017)

== Operational activities ==
The functions of the department are broadly classified into the following matters:

- Employment policy, including employment services
- Job Services Australia
- Labour market programs for people of working age
- Workplace relations policy development, advocacy and implementation
- Promotion of flexible workplace relations policies and practices, including workplace productivity
- Co-ordination of labour market research
- Occupational health and safety, rehabilitation and compensation
- Equal employment opportunity
- Work and family programs
- Reducing the burden of government regulation
- Small business policy and programmes

== See also ==
- Minister for Employment
- List of Australian Commonwealth Government entities
