= Ministry of Labour =

A ministry of labour (UK), or labor (US), also known as a department of labour, or labor, is a government department responsible for setting labour standards, labour dispute mechanisms, employment, workforce participation, training, and social security. Such a department may have national or regional (e.g. provincial or state-level) authority.

== Lists of current ministries of labour ==
=== Named "ministry" ===
==== Africa ====
- Ministry of Manpower and Immigration (Egypt)
- Ministry of Employment and Labour Relations (Ghana)
- Ministry of Labour and Social Security (Jamaica)
- Ministry of Labour and Social Affairs (Puntland)
- Federal Ministry of Labour and Productivity (Nigeria)
  - Rivers State Ministry of Employment Generation and Empowerment
- Ministry of Labour and Social Affairs (Somalia)
- Ministry of Employment, Social and Family Affairs (Somaliland)
- Ministry of Labour, Public Service and Human Resource Development (South Sudan)
- Ministry of Labour and Employment (Tanzania)
- Ministry of Labour and Social Security (Zambia)
- Ministry of Public Service, Labour and Social Welfare (Zimbabwe)

==== Americas ====
- Ministry of Labour, Employment and Social Security (Argentina)
- Ministry of Labour (Barbados)
- Ministry of Work, Employment, and Social Security (Bolivia)
- Ministry of Labour and Employment (Brazil)
- Ministry of Labour and Social Security (Cuba)
- Ministry of Labour (Ontario)
- Ministry of Labour and Promotion of Employment (Peru)
- Ministry of Employment and Social Solidarity (Quebec)
- Ministry of Gender, Labour and Social Development (Uganda)

==== Asia ====
- Ministry of Labour and Social Protection of the Population (Azerbaijan)
- Ministry of Labour and Employment (Bangladesh)
- Ministry of Labour and Human Resources (Bhutan)
- Ministry of Labour and Vocational Training (Cambodia)
- Ministry of Human Resources and Social Security (China)
- Ministry of Labour (Colombia)
- Ministry of Labour and Employment (India)
- Ministry of Manpower (Indonesia)
- Ministry of Cooperatives, Labour, and Social Welfare (Iran)
- Ministry of Social Affairs and Social Services (Israel)
- Ministry of Health, Labour and Welfare (Japan)
- Ministry of Employment and Labor (South Korea)
- Ministry of Human Resources (Malaysia)
- Ministry of Labour (Myanmar)
- Ministry of Labour, Employment and Social Security (Nepal)
- Ministry of Labour (Pakistan)
- Ministry of Manpower (Singapore)
- Ministry of Labour, Trade Union Relations and Sabaragamuwa Development (Sri Lanka)
- Ministry of Labor (Taiwan)
- Ministry of Labour (Thailand)
- Ministry of Labor and Social Protection of Population (Uzbekistan)
- Ministry of Labour, Invalids and Social Affairs (Vietnam)

==== Europe ====
- Ministry of Labour and Social Affairs (Albania)
- Ministry of Labour and Pension System (Croatia)
- Ministry of Labour and Social Affairs (Czech Republic)
- Ministry of Employment (Denmark)
- Ministry of Health, Labour and Social Affairs of Georgia
- Federal Ministry of Labour and Social Affairs (Germany)
- Ministry of Labour, Social Insurance and Social Solidarity (Greece)
- Ministry of Labour and Social Policies (Italy)
- Ministry of Social Security and Labour (Lithuania)
- Ministry of Labour and Social Protection (Moldova)
- Ministry of Social Affairs and Employment (Netherlands)
- Ministry of Labour (Norway)
- Ministry of Family, Labour and Social Policy (Poland)
- Ministry of Labour, Solidarity and Social Security (Portugal)
- Ministry of Labor and Social Justice (Romania)
- Ministry of Labour and Social Affairs (Russia)
- Ministry of Labour, Employment, Veteran and Social Policy (Serbia)
- Ministry of Labour (Spain)
- Ministry of Employment (Sweden)
- Ministry of Labour and Social Security (Turkey)
- Ministry of Social Policy of Ukraine

==== Oceania ====
- Ministry of Business, Innovation and Employment (New Zealand)

=== Named "Department" ===
- Department of Employment and Workplace Relations (Australia)
- Department of Labour and Employment (Haryana)
- Labour Department (Hong Kong)
- Department of Labour (New Brunswick)
- Department of Labor and Employment (Philippines)
- Department of Labour (South Africa)
- Department of Labour and Employment (Tamil Nadu)
- Department for Work and Pensions (United Kingdom)
- United States Department of Labor
  - Alaska Department of Labor and Workforce Development
  - California Labor and Workforce Development Agency
  - Connecticut Department of Labor
  - Colorado Department of Labor and Employment
  - Georgia Department of Labor
  - Idaho Department of Labor
  - Illinois Department of Labor
  - Kansas Department of Labor
  - Maryland Department of Labor
  - Michigan Department of Labor and Economic Opportunity
  - Minnesota Department of Labor and Industry
  - New Hampshire Department of Labor
  - New Jersey Department of Labor and Workforce Development
  - New York State Department of Labor
  - North Dakota Department of Labor and Human Rights
  - Oklahoma Department of Labor
  - Pennsylvania Department of Labor and Industry
  - Puerto Rico Department of Labor and Human Resources
  - South Carolina Department of Labor
  - Virginia Department of Labor and Industry
  - Washington State Department of Labor and Industries

=== Other names ===
- Federal Public Service Employment (Belgium)
- Employment and Social Development Canada
- Labour and Welfare Bureau (Hong Kong)
- Secretariat of Labor and Social Welfare (Mexico)
- Oregon Bureau of Labor and Industries

== Historical ==
=== Named "Ministry" ===
- Ministry of Social Protection (Colombia)
- Federal Ministry for Economics and Labour (Germany)
- Ministry of Labour and Social Affairs (Iran)
- Ministry of Labour and Sports (Norway)
- Ministry of Labour (Quebec)
- Ministry of Manpower and Income Security (Quebec)
- Ministry of Labour (United Kingdom)

=== Named "Department" ===
- Department of Labour (Australia)
- Department of Jobs and Small Business (Australia)
- Department of Employment (Australia)
- Department of Education, Employment and Workplace Relations superseded (Australia)
- Department of Training and Workforce Development (Western Australia)
- Department of Employment, Workplace Relations and Small Business (Australia)
- Department of Labor and Immigration (Australia)
- Department of Labour and National Service (Australia)
- Department of Workplace Relations and Small Business (Australia)
- Department of Labour (Ireland) (title from 1966 to 1993; see now Department of Enterprise, Tourism and Employment)
- Department of Labour (New Zealand)

=== Other names ===
- Human Resources Development Canada

== See also ==
- Minister of Labour
- Ministry of Manpower
