= List of education ministries =

An education ministry is a national or subnational government agency politically responsible for education. Various other names are commonly used to identify such agencies, such as Ministry of Education, Department of Education, and Ministry of Public Education, and the head of such an agency may be a minister of education or secretary of education. Such agencies typically address educational concerns such as the quality of schools or standardization of curriculum.

The first such ministry ever is considered to be the Commission of National Education (Polish: Komisja Edukacji Narodowej, Lithuanian: Edukacinė komisija), founded in 1773 in the Polish–Lithuanian Commonwealth.

Following is a list of education ministries by country:

== Africa ==
- Algeria: Ministry of National Education
- Egypt: Ministry of Education
- Ethiopia: Ministry of Education
- Ghana: Ministry of Education
- Kenya: Ministry of Education
- Namibia: Ministry of Education
- Nigeria: Federal Ministry of Education
  - Rivers State: Rivers State Ministry of Education
  - Kaduna State: Ministry of Education, Science and Technology
- Rhodesia: Ministry of Education (1965–1979)
- Rwanda: Ministry of Education
- Sierra Leone: Ministry of Education
- Somalia: Ministry of Education
  - Puntland: Ministry of Education and Higher Education
- Somaliland: Ministry of Education and Science
- South Africa
  - Department of Higher Education and Training
  - Department of Basic Education
  - Abolished:
    - Department of Education (South Africa) (split in 2009)
    - Bantu Education Department (1953–1994)
- Sudan: Ministry of Higher Education and Scientific Research
- Zambia
  - Ministry of General Education
  - Ministry of Higher Education
- Zimbabwe
  - Ministry of Education, Sport and Culture
  - Ministry of Higher and Tertiary Education, Innovation, Science and Technology Development
  - Ministry of Primary and Secondary Education

== Americas ==
- Antigua and Barbuda: Ministry of Education, Sports and Creative Industries
- Argentina:
  - Ministry of Human Capital
  - Secretariat of Education
- Bahamas: Ministry of Education
- Barbados: Ministry of Education, Technological and Vocational Training
- Belize: Ministry of Education and Youth
- Bolivia: Ministry of Education
- Brazil: Ministry of Education
- Canada: no federal ministry, see Education in Canada:
  - Alberta: Ministry of Education
  - British Columbia: Minister of Education and Child Care
  - Manitoba: Minister of Education
  - New Brunswick: Department of Education and Early Childhood Development
  - Newfoundland and Labrador: Education and Early Childhood Development
  - Northwest Territories: Minister of Education, Culture and Employment
  - Nova Scotia: Department of Education
  - Nunavut: Department of Education
  - Ontario: Ministry of Education
  - Prince Edward Island: Department of Education and Early Years
  - Quebec: Ministry of Education and Higher Education
  - Saskatchewan: Ministry of Education
  - Yukon: Department of Education
- Chile: Ministry of Education
- Colombia: Ministry of National Education
- Costa Rica: Ministry of Education
- Dominican Republic: Ministry of Education
- Ecuador: Ministry of Education
- El Salvador: Ministry of Education
- Guatemala: Ministry of Education
- Honduras: Secretariat of Education
- Mexico: Secretariat of Public Education
- Nicaragua: Ministry of Education
- Panama: Ministry of Education
- Peru: Ministry of Education
- Saint Vincent and the Grenadines: Ministry of Education and National Reconciliation
- United States: United States Department of Education, headed by the United States Secretary of Education
  - Many U.S. states also have a state-level department of education
  - Puerto Rico Department of Education
- Uruguay: Ministry of Education and Culture
- Venezuela: Ministry of Education

== Asia ==
- Afghanistan: Ministry of Education
- Azerbaijan: Ministry of Science and Education
- Bahrain: Ministry of Education
- Bangladesh
  - Ministry of Primary and Mass Education
  - Ministry of Education
- Bhutan: Ministry of Education
- Brunei: Ministry of Education
- Cambodia: Ministry of Education, Youth and Sport
- China: Ministry of Education
- Hong Kong: Education Bureau
- India: Ministry of Education
  - Haryana: Department of Higher Education
  - Jharkhand: Department of School Education & Literacy
  - Karnataka: Department of Higher Education
  - Kerala:
    - Department of General Education
    - Department of Higher Education
  - Odisha: Department of Higher Education
  - Tamil Nadu:
    - Department of Higher Education
    - Department of School Education
  - Telangana: Department of Education
  - West Bengal: Department of School Education
- Indonesia
  - Ministry of Primary and Secondary Education
  - Ministry of Higher Education, Science, and Technology
  - Ministry of Religious Affairs
- Iran: Ministry of Education
- Iraq: Ministry of Education
  - Kurdistan Region: Ministry of Education
- Israel: Ministry of Education
- Japan: Ministry of Education, Culture, Sports, Science and Technology
- Jordan
  - Ministry of Education
  - Ministry of Higher Education and Scientific Research
- Kuwait: Ministry of Education (Kuwait)
- Laos: Ministry of Education
- Lebanon: Ministry of Education and Higher Education
- Macau: Education and Youth Development Bureau
- Malaysia
  - Ministry of Education
  - Ministry of Higher Education
- Maldives: Ministry of Education
- Myanmar: Ministry of Education
- Nepal: Ministry of Education
- Pakistan: Ministry of Education
- Palestine: Ministry of Education
- Philippines
  - Commission on Higher Education
  - Department of Education
  - Technical Education and Skills Development Authority
- Saudi Arabia: Ministry of Education
- Singapore: Ministry of Education
- South Korea: Ministry of Education
- Sri Lanka: Ministry of Education
- Syria
  - Ministry of Education
  - Ministry of Higher Education and Scientific Research
- Taiwan: Ministry of Education
- Tajikistan: Ministry of Education and Science
- Thailand: Ministry of Education
- Timor-Leste
  - Ministry of Education, Youth and Sport
  - Ministry of Higher Education, Science and Culture
- Vietnam: Ministry of Education and Training
- Yemen: Ministry of Education

== Europe ==
- Albania: Ministry of Education
- Armenia: Ministry of Education, Science, Culture and Sports
- Austria: Ministry of Education, Science and Research
- Belgium: no federal ministry, see Education in Belgium:
  - Flanders: Flemish Ministry of Education and Training
  - French Community: General Administration for Education and Scientific Research of the Ministry of the French Community
  - German-speaking Community: Ministry of Education and Employment
- Bosnia and Herzegovina: Ministry of Civil Affairs
- Bulgaria: Ministry of Education and Science
- Croatia: Ministry of Science and Education
- Cyprus: Ministry of Education, Sports and Youth
- Czech Republic: Ministry of Education, Youth and Sports
- Denmark: Minister of Education
  - Faroe Islands: Ministry of Education, Research and Culture
- Estonia: Ministry of Education and Research
- Finland: Ministry of Education and Culture
  - Åland: Department for Education and Culture
- France: Ministry of National Education
- Georgia: Ministry of Education, Science, Culture and Sport of Georgia
- Germany: Federal Ministry for Education, Family Affairs, Senior Citizens, Women and Youth
- Greece: Ministry of Education, Religious Affairs and Sports
- Iceland: Ministry of Education and Children
- Ireland:
  - Department of Education and Youth
  - Department of Further and Higher Education, Research, Innovation and Science
- Italy: Ministry of Public Education
- Latvia: Ministry of Science and Education
- Lithuania: Ministry of Education and Science
- Luxembourg: Ministry of National Education, Children and Youth
- Moldova: Ministry of Education and Research
- Montenegro: Ministry of Education
- Netherlands: Ministry of Education, Culture and Science
- North Macedonia: Ministry of Education and Science
- Norway: Ministry of Education and Research
- Poland: Commission of National Education
  - Ministry of National Education
- Portugal: Ministry of Education
- Romania: Ministry of Education
- Russia: Ministry of Education and Science, split in 2018 into:
  - Ministry of Education
  - Ministry of Science and Higher Education
- Serbia: Ministry of Education
- Slovakia: Ministry of Education, Research, Development and Youth of the Slovak Republic
- Slovenia:
  - Ministry of Education
  - Ministry of Higher Education, Science and Innovation
- Spain: Ministry of Education
- Sweden: Ministry of Education and Research
- Switzerland: Federal Department of Economic Affairs, Education and Research
  - State Secretariat for Education, Research and Innovation
- Turkey: Ministry of National Education
- Ukraine: Ministry of Education and Science of Ukraine
- United Kingdom and Crown dependencies:
  - England: Department for Education; previously, Department for Education and Skills and Ministry of Education
  - Guernsey: Committee for Education, Sport & Culture
  - Isle of Man: Department of Education, Sport and Culture
  - Jersey: Department for Children, Young People, Education and Skills
  - Northern Ireland: Department of Education
  - Scotland: Education and Justice Directorates
  - Wales: Cabinet Secretary for Education

== Oceania ==
- Australia
  - Department of Education (since 2022)
  - Abolished:
    - Department of Education, Skills and Employment (2020–2022)
    - Department of Education (2019–2020)
    - Department of Education and Training (2014–2019)
    - Department of Education (Australia, 2013–14)
    - For earlier antecedents, see preceding departments
  - State-government departments:
    - Australian Capital Territory: Education and Training Directorate
    - New South Wales: Department of Education
    - Northern Territory: Department of Education
    - Queensland: Department of Education
    - South Australia: Department for Education
    - Tasmania: Department for Education, Children and Young People
    - Victoria: Department of Education and Training
    - Western Australia: Department of Education
- Kiribati: Ministry of Education
- Marshall Islands: Ministry of Education
- New Zealand:
  - Ministry of Education
  - Abolished:
    - Department of Education
- Solomon Islands: Ministry of Education and Human Resources Development

== See also ==
- Right to science and culture
- Human rights
- Right to education
- Right to an adequate standard of living
- Welfare rights
- Right to education
- Economic, social and cultural rights
- Culture minister
- Cultural genocide
- Education minister
- Ministry of Culture and Tourism (disambiguation)
- Ministry of Education and Culture
- Education
