= Department of Employment (Australia) =

Australian Government department 2013–2017

Department overview
- Formed: 18 September 2013
- Preceding Department: Department of Education, Employment and Workplace Relations
- Dissolved: 20 December 2017
- Superseding Department: Department of Jobs and Small Business
- Jurisdiction: Commonwealth of Australia
- Annual budget: $1.951 billion (2014–15)
- Minister responsible: Michaelia Cash, Minister for Employment
- Department executive: Kerri Hartland, Secretary
- Website: www.employment.gov.au

The Australian Department of Employment was a department of the Government of Australia charged with the responsibility for national policies and programs that help Australians find and keep employment and work in safe, fair and productive workplaces. On 20 December 2017 the department was dissolved and its functions assumed by the newly formed Department of Jobs and Small Business.

The head of the department was the Secretary of the Department of Employment, Kerri Hartland, who reported to the Minister for Employment, Senator the Hon. Michaelia Cash.

== History ==
The department was formed by way of an Administrative Arrangements Order issued on 18 September 2013 and replaced the functions previously performed by the Department of Education, Employment and Workplace Relations (DEEWR). DEEWR was formed in 2007 and absorbed the former Department of Education, Science and Training and the former Department of Employment and Workplace Relations.

=== Preceding departments ===
- Department of Labor and Immigration (12 June 1974 – 22 December 1975)
- Department of Employment and Industrial Relations (22 December 1975 – 5 December 1978)
- Department of Employment and Youth Affairs (5 December 1978 – 7 May 1982)
- Department of Employment and Industrial Relations (7 May 1982 – 24 July 1987)
- Department of Employment, Education and Training (24 July 1987 – 11 March 1996)
- Department of Employment, Education, Training and Youth Affairs (11 March 1996 – 21 October 1998)
- Department of Employment, Workplace Relations and Small Business (21 October 1998 – 26 November 2001)
- Department of Employment and Workplace Relations (26 November 2001 – 3 December 2007)
- Department of Education, Employment and Workplace Relations (3 December 2007 – 18 September 2013)

== Operational activities ==
The functions of the department were broadly classified into the following matters:

- Employment policy, including employment services
- Job Services Australia
- Labour market programs for people of working age
- Workplace relations policy development, advocacy and implementation
- Promotion of flexible workplace relations policies and practices, including workplace productivity
- Co-ordination of labour market research
- Occupational health and safety, rehabilitation and compensation
- Equal employment opportunity
- Work and family programs

== See also ==
- Minister for Employment
- List of Australian Commonwealth Government entities
