= Wendy Jarvie =

Public servant

Dr. Wendy Jarvie
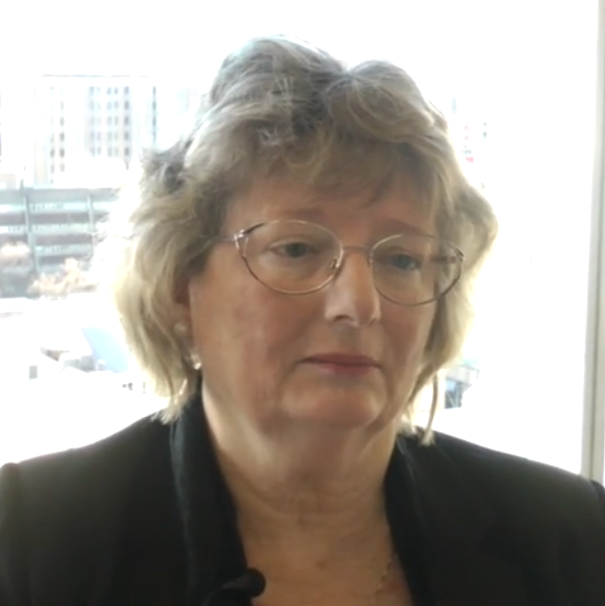
- In a Lowy Institute video in 2012

Secretary of the Department of Education, Science and Training (Acting)
- In office 10 February 2003 – 10 March 2003

Personal details
- Education: Flinders University; University of Newcastle; Harvard University
- Occupation: Public servant

Dr. Wendy K. Jarvie is a public policy academic and retired senior Australian public servant.

== Education and career ==
Attending Flinders University, Jarvie was awarded her PhD in Geography in 1984. After completing her PhD, Jarvie joined the Australian Public Service in the Bureau of Labour Market Research.

Between 2001 and 2007, Wendy Jarvie was a Deputy Secretary at the Department of Education, Science and Training, staying in the role when the department transitioned to become the Department of Education, Employment and Workplace Relations. During her time at DEST, Jarvie was involved with, among other things, policy behind Australia's Vocational and Technical Education System. Jarvie left the Australian Public Service in 2008.

From 1998 to 2001 Jarvie worked at the World Bank in Washington, D.C., first in the Operations Evaluation Department and later on operations and country strategies, including work on small states and middle-income country strategy. After leaving the APS she held visiting and adjunct roles including at the University of New South Wales/ANZSOG, where she taught and spoke on sustaining reforms in Indigenous communities, and in 2012 she was appointed to AusAID’s Independent Evaluation Committee.

In addition she worked for three years in the World Bank in Washington (1998–2001), initially in the Operations Evaluation Department where she was a manager of corporate evaluations and evaluation methods, and later in Operations and Country Strategies where she worked on small states issues, and managed a taskforce on Bank strategies for middle income countries.

In 2010, while a visiting professor at the University of New South Wales, Jarvie spoke on implementing and sustaining reforms in Australian Aboriginal and Torres Strait Islander communities.

In 2012, Jarvie was appointed to be a member of the AusAID Independent Evaluation Committee.

Government offices
Preceded by Peter Shergold	Secretary of the Department of Education, Science and Training (Acting); 2003	Succeeded by Jeff Harmer
