= Lisa Paul =

Australian public servant and policymaker

Lisa Paul AO PSM
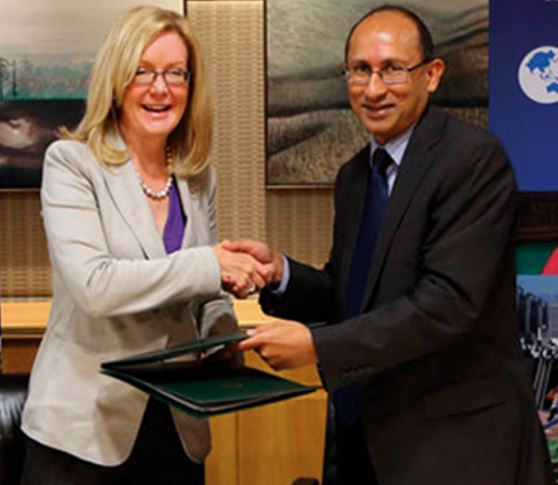
- Paul (left) with Peter Varghese (right) in 2014

7th Chancellor of the University of Canberra
- Incumbent
- Assumed office 1 January 2024
- Preceded by: Tom Calma

Secretary of the Department of Education and Training
- In office 23 December 2014 – 29 January 2016

Secretary of the Department of Education
- In office 18 September 2013 – 23 December 2014

Secretary of the Department of Education, Employment and Workplace Relations
- In office 3 December 2007 – 18 September 2013

Secretary of the Department of Education, Science and Training
- In office 26 October 2004 – 3 December 2007

Personal details
- Born: Lisa Marian Paul California, United States
- Education: Australian National University (BA)
- Occupation: Public servant

Lisa Marian Paul AO PSM is the seventh chancellor of the University of Canberra and a former senior Australian public servant and policymaker. She was the Secretary of the Department of Education and Training until February 2016.

== Personal life ==
Lisa Paul was born in California, United States, the daughter of two teachers. When she was young, Paul and her family moved to Christchurch, New Zealand and then to Adelaide, South Australia following her father's job opportunities. Paul holds an Arts degree she obtained from the Australian National University.

== Career ==
After a first-job working at Target Newton in Adelaide, Paul's first public service role was in the Australian Capital Territory (ACT) Government Housing Trust. Her career in the ACT public sector included the time during the ACT's transition to self-government.

Paul led the Commonwealth's domestic response to the 2002 Bali bombings while a Deputy Secretary in the Department of Family and Community Services.

Paul was appointed Secretary of the Department of Education, Science and Training in October 2004. The Department then became the Department of Education, Employment and Workplace Relations. It was split into two in 2013 after the Abbott government took power and Paul was appointed Secretary of the Department of Education. She was also named to head the new Department of Education and Training when the Department was formed in December 2014, encompassing much of the previous department.

In December 2015, Paul announced her intention to leave her role at the Department of Education and Training in February 2016. In December 2016 Paul was appointed a member of the Australian Government's Naval Shipbuilding Advisory Board.

Paul has served as the chair of headspace since 2018 and is a member of Raise Foundation's Patron's Advisory Council.

== Awards and honours ==
In October 2003 Paul was awarded a Public Service Medal for outstanding public service as Chair of the Commonwealth Bali Interagency Taskforce in the development of the Commonwealth's response in support of the victims of the bombings which occurred in Bali on 12 October 2002. In June 2011 Paul was appointed an Officer of the Order of Australia for distinguished service to public sector leadership in key policy and program implementation, particularly through driving reform in education, employment and workplace. In the same year Paul was named as Federal Government Leader of the Year. In September 2024 Paul was awarded the Academy Medal by the Australian Academy of Science for advancing the cause of science and technology in Australia by means other than research.

== References and further reading ==
- Malone, Paul (2006), "Chapter 8: Californian Dreamer – Lisa Paul, Department of Education, Science and Training", Australian department heads under Howard : career paths and practice (PDF), Canberra, Australia: The Australian National University, pp. 45–49, ISBN 1-920942-83-1, archived from the original (PDF) on 6 November 2013

Academic offices
Preceded by Tom Calma	Chancellor of the University of Canberra; 2024–present	Incumbent

Government offices
Preceded by Jeff Harmer	Secretary of the Department of Education, Science and Training; 2004 – 2007	Succeeded by Herself as Secretary of the Department of Education, Employment and Workplace Relations
Preceded by Peter Boxall	Secretary of the Department of Education, Employment and Workplace Relations; 2007 – 2013	Succeeded by Herself as Secretary of the Department of Education
Preceded by Herself as Secretary of the Department of Education, Science and Training	Secretary of the Department of Education, Employment and Workplace Relations; 2007 – 2013	Succeeded by Renée Leon as Secretary of the Department of Employment
Preceded by Herself as Secretary of the Department of Education, Employment and Workplace Relations	Secretary of the Department of Education; 2013 – 2014	Succeeded by Herself as Secretary of the Department of Education and Training
Preceded by Herself as Secretary of the Department of Education	Secretary of the Department of Education and Training; 2014 – 2016	Succeeded by Michele Bruniges
