= Commonwealth Employment Service =

Former Australian government workforce agency

CES logo

The Commonwealth Employment Service (CES) was an Australian Government employment agency that was established in 1946 with the introduction of the Re-establishment and Employment Act 1945 under the Curtin ALP government. It was designed to identify labour shortages, and solve them through supplying labour. It also conducted a "work test" of welfare recipients, to prove their willingness (and ability) to work.

Returned soldiers whose disabilities caused them difficulty finding employment were further assisted by the federal government's Vocational Training Scheme for Invalid Pensioners (which had started in 1941). In 1948, this became the Commonwealth Rehabilitation Service (CRS). Over time the CRS came to help disabled Australians from any background to enter employment.

The CES continued to exist under the Department of Employment and Industrial Relations according to the provisions of the Commonwealth Employment Service Act 1978. In 1987 the department became Department of Employment, Education and Training (DEET).

== 1990s ==
On 1 July 1991, the "Newstart Allowance" replaced the Unemployment Benefit (UB) which had been unchanged since 1945. It was part of a government reform called Newstart - the Active Employment Strategy.

The ALP government of Paul Keating released the "Restoring Full Employment" and "Working Nation" white papers in 1994. They collectively envisioned providing increased personalised services for the long-term unemployed while also increasing penalties for government welfare recipients who avoided work - improving the "reciprocal obligation" between government and unemployed citizens. This was known as the "Job Compact". People employed for 18 months or more were guaranteed six months employment (usually with a private company, assisted by a wage subsidy), or training.

"Working Nation" was largely enacted through the Employment Services Act 1994. This established the "Employment Service Regulatory Agency" (ESRA), which according to Working Nation was to "promote the development of community and private sector case managers and to ensure fair competition between the CES and other agencies."

Working Nation called for "a major strengthening of the CES so that it is responsive and effective in a strengthening market and can play a key role in the delivery of the Job Compact and the Youth Training Initiative". The new act created "Employment Assistance Australia" (EAA) which was created separate to the CES as a federal government body to deliver employment services in the market ESRA managed.

In 1996, a new federal Liberal government under John Howard was elected with a commitment to the Keating structural reforms. Shortly after, the department the CES was in became known as the Department of Employment, Education, Training and Youth Affairs (DEETYA).

Many employment services the CES had offered were now put up to tender to "Job Agencies". These Job Agencies were often run by private companies or charities - they were the "community and private sector case managers" of Working Nation. The government's Job Agency, EAA, grew. EAA officers worked in existing CES centres in the majority of cases.

The CES' focus moved to "Intensive Assistance" for all long term unemployed clients, with a view to assisting those clients with disadvantages to gaining and sustaining employment.

From October 1996, the new government began to discontinue or defund the new personalised services the Working Nation plan had provided to the unemployed.

In late 1996, Job Search Kiosks were built in CES centres. (The initial idea was to also place these kiosks in shopping centres and libraries to facilitate greater access to jobs for the community, however the plan was never implemented.)

CES staff were advised in March 1997 that as of 30 March 1998 the CES would cease to operate. Its functions were to be split between what was soon to be known as Centrelink (a federal government welfare agency), and ESRA (soon to be known as the Job Network, a market of competing employment services organisations).

At this time, EAA become Employment National and continued to compete with the other Job Agencies. This government-run successor to the CES was closed in 2003.
