= Ministry of Labour and Social Security =

Ministry of Labour and Social Security may refer to any of the following

- Ministry of Labor and Social Security (China)
- Ministry of Labour and Social Security (Greece)
- Ministry of Labour and Social Security (Jamaica)
- Ministry of Labour and Social Security (Sierra Leone)
- Ministry of Labour and Social Security (Turkey)
- Ministry of Labour and Social Security (Zambia)
