= Derek Volker =

Australian public servant

Derek Volker AO

Secretary of the Department of Veterans' Affairs
- In office 1981 – 14 November 1986

Secretary of the Department of Social Security
- In office 14 November 1986 – 24 March 1993

Secretary of the Department of Employment, Education and Training
- In office 24 March 1993 – 11 March 1996

Personal details
- Born: 1939 (age 86–87)
- Occupation: Public servant

Derek Volker AO (born 1939) is a retired senior Australian public servant.

== Life and career ==
Born in 1939, Volker was educated at Toowoomba State High School and the University of Queensland.

Volker's early Australian Public Service career was in the Department of Labour and the Department of Immigration and Ethnic Affairs.

Prime Minister Malcolm Fraser appointed Volker as Secretary of the Department of Veterans' Affairs in 1981, with the mandate to clean up the administration of the department.

In 1986, Prime Minister Bob Hawke transferred Volker to a position as Secretary of the Department of Social Security (DSS). In his time at DSS, Volker had to deal with the pressures of the recession and its impact on Social Security offices, including long queues and increasing tension.

Prime Minister Paul Keating announced Volker's transfer from the Department of Social Security to the Department of Employment, Education and Training in March 1993.

In 1996, Volker was one of six Secretaries removed from their roles by the newly elected Howard government. Political scientist Richard Mulgan speculates that Volker's removal was a result of Prime Minister John Howard's "determination to impose a new sense of direction on the public service".

After leaving the Australian Public Service, Volker stayed in the workforce and took on various senior roles in both government and non-government organisations, including as Chairman at the Government Relations Group in the national law firm Corrs Chambers Westgarth, Chair of the ACT Government's Skills Commission, and Chairman of the Defence Housing Australia Board of Directors.

== Awards ==
In January 1991, Volker was made an Officer of the Order of Australia for public service.

Government offices
Preceded by Richard Kingsland	Secretary of the Department of Veterans' Affairs; 1981–1986	Succeeded by Noel Tanzer
Preceded by Tony Ayers	Secretary of the Department of Social Security; 1986–1993	Succeeded by Tony Blunn
Preceded by Greg Taylor	Secretary of the Department of Employment, Education and Training; 1993–1996	Succeeded by Sandy Hollway as Secretary of the Department of Employment, Education, Training and Youth Affairs
