= Remote experiment =

A remote experiment is a real experiment with real laboratory instruments and equipment that can be controlled by a computer through the internet. One or more remote experiments are accessible in remote laboratory.

Remotely controlled experiments have become a widespread tool for teaching physics at the university level of education. When executing remote experiments the remote users can change system parameters, observe results in graphical form and/or by video transmission from webcam, and download the experimental results. Sometimes a booking system is available for remote experiments that allows the users to book time for access of remote experiment in advance. User operates remote experiment via graphical user interface. Remote experiments are positively evaluated by the learners.

== Advantages of remote experiments ==
When compared to simulations in virtual laboratories and to experiments in the traditional laboratories, remotely controlled experiments have following advantages:

- remote experiments can be carried out from anywhere in the world;
- no time restriction since experiments are available 24 hours a day, 7 days a week;
- overcoming problems with limited laboratory capacity for numerous students;
- safe and secure operation of equipment without danger of user's injury;
- remote experiments can be shared between education institutions as for example in labshare initiative.

== Users of remote experiments ==
Remote experiments are a powerful technology which can be implemented in distance education to provide the learner hands-on experience. Remote experiments can be especially valuable for some groups of users:

- learners with physical disabilities, who cannot intend traditional laboratory exercises;
- part-time students, who cannot intend traditional laboratory exercises;
- learners who are undergoing continued education (Lifelong learning) and have to integrate learning activities into their everyday schedule.

== See also ==
- Remote laboratory
