= Steve Sedgwick (public servant) =

Australian public servant

Steve Sedgwick AO

Secretary of the Department of Finance
- In office 9 February 1992 – 17 January 1997

Secretary of the Department of Employment, Education, Training and Youth Affairs
- In office 18 January 1997 – 21 October 1998

Secretary of the Department of Education, Training and Youth Affairs
- In office 21 October 1998 – 26 November 2001

Secretary of the Department of Education, Science and Training
- In office 26 November 2001 – 18 January 2002

Australian Public Service Commissioner
- In office 2009 – 13 December 2014

Personal details
- Born: Stephen Thomas Sedgwick; 8 February 1950
- Died: 25 November 2024 (aged 74)
- Education: University of Sydney (BEc hons); London School of Economics
- Occupation: Public servant

Stephen Thomas Sedgwick, AO (8 February 1950 – 25 November 2024) was a retired senior Australian public servant. He is best known for his time as Australian Public Service Commissioner between 2009 and 2014, and for his prior appointments as secretary of various departments in the Australian Public Service.

== Life and career ==
Steve Sedgwick was born on 8 February 1950.

In 1985, Sedgwick was appointed as a senior economic advisor to Prime Minister Bob Hawke. In September 1988, Sedgwick resigned from the role and took up a position as a Deputy Secretary of the Department of Finance.

He was appointed as Secretary of the Department of Finance in February 1992, after having acted in the role since January 1992. In 1997, he moved from the finance department to the secretary heading the Department of Employment, Education, Training and Youth Affairs (later Department of Education, Training and Youth Affairs and then Department of Education, Science and Training).

Between 2002 and 2007, Sedgwick was a Director, nominated by the Australian Government, on the board of directors of the Asian Development Bank based in Manila.

In December 2009, on the recommendation of the Rudd Government, Sedgwick was appointed Australian Public Service Commissioner. He finished his term on 13 December 2014.

Sedgwick is a member of the Jawun board.

In April 2016 Sedgwick was commissioned to conduct a review into bankers' pay and commissions; and recommended the termination of bonus payments to retail bank employees that are linked to sales performance.

Sedgwick died on 25 November 2024 after a short illness.

== Awards ==
In 2001, Sedgwick received a Centenary Medal for service to Australian society through public service leadership. Sedgwick was made an Officer of the Order of Australia in June 2012.

== References and further reading ==
- Sedgwick, Stephen (16 April 2014). "Why public servants should be impartial". The Canberra Times. Fairfax Media. Archived from the original on 17 April 2014.
- "Executive Appointments". The Canberra Times. 19 August 1991. p. 11.
- "New IC head". The Canberra Times. 25 July 1991. p. 12.
- "Australian Leader on Bureaucratic Reform to Visit Jakarta" (Press release). Australian Embassy, Indonesia. 7 June 2010. Archived from the original on 11 February 2014.
- Roozendaal, Eric (20 August 2009). "Stephen Sedgwick appointed NSW Government's Chair of Better Services and Value Taskforce" (PDF) (Press release). NSW Treasury. Archived from the original (PDF) on 13 March 2011.
- "Steve Sedgwick to head key University of Melbourne economic/social research think-tank" (Press release). University of Melbourne. 27 March 2007.
- Advisory Council: Stephen Sedgwick, Australian National University, archived from the original on 20 April 2013
- Towell, Noel (6 November 2013). "Public Service Commissioner Stephen Sedgwick puts lazy bureaucrats on notice". The Canberra Times. Fairfax Media. Archived from the original on 27 February 2014.
- Speakers Presentations, Institute of Public Administration Australia, archived from the original on 27 March 2014
- Mr Stephen Sedgwick AO, FIPAA, Australian Public Service Commission, archived from the original on 11 February 2014
- Advisory Council: Stephen Sedgwick, Australian National University

Government offices
Preceded by Michael Keating	Secretary of the Department of Finance; 1992–1997	Succeeded by Peter Boxall
Preceded by Sandy Hollway	Secretary of the Department of Employment, Education, Training and Youth Affairs; 1997–1998	Succeeded by Himself as Secretary of the Department of Education, Training and Youth Affairs
Preceded by Sandy Hollway	Secretary of the Department of Employment, Education, Training and Youth Affairs; 1997–1998	Succeeded by Peter Shergold as Secretary of the Department of Employment, Workplace Relations and Small Business
Preceded by Himself as Secretary of the Department of Employment, Education, Training and Youth Affairs	Secretary of the Department of Education, Training and Youth Affairs; 1998–2001	Succeeded by Himself as Secretary of the Department of Education, Science and Training
Preceded by Himself as Secretary of the Department of Education, Training and Youth Affairs	Secretary of the Department of Education, Science and Training; 2001–2002	Succeeded by Peter Shergold
Preceded by Lynelle Briggs	Australian Public Service Commissioner; 2009–2014	Succeeded by John Lloyd
