= Michele Bruniges =

Australian teacher and public servant

Michele Bruniges AO

Secretary of the Department of Education, Skills and Employment
- In office 4 April 2016 – 4 April 2023
- Preceded by: Lisa Paul
- Succeeded by: Tony Cook PSM

Personal details
- Born: Michele Denise Henrick Tumut, New South Wales, Australia
- Spouse: Paul Bruniges
- Education: University of New South Wales
- Occupation: Public servant

Michele Denise Bruniges AO is an Australian teacher and education administrator. In April 2016 she began her role as secretary of the Australian Government Department of Education and Training.

Bruniges has a doctorate of philosophy in educational measurement and a master's degree in education from the University of New South Wales, and a graduate diploma in educational studies and a diploma in teaching from the Goulburn College of Advanced Education.

== Career ==
Bruniges began her teaching career in 1980 at Leppington Public School prior to becoming a high school teacher of mathematics and computing at St Johns Park High School and Ingleburn High School. She also taught in TAFE NSW and the Adult Migrant Education Service.

From 2005 to 2008, Bruniges was chief executive of the ACT Department of Education and Training. She held various federal positions with the Department of Education, Employment and Workplace Relations (DEEWR), including deputy secretary for the Office of Early Childhood Education and Child Care; and deputy secretary, Schools and Associate Secretary, Schools and Youth.

She was appointed as director-general of the NSW Department of Education and Training in July 2011 and commenced on 7 September 2011.

From 2012 to 2015, Bruniges was also an honorary adjunct professor of education in the Faculty of Arts and Social Sciences at the University of New South Wales.

In March 2016, Prime Minister Malcolm Turnbull announced Bruniges' appointment as the secretary of the Australian Government Department of Education and Training. Since February 2020, the department has been known as Department of Education, Skills and Employment. The department is now known as the Department of Education. Bruniges finished her tenure on 4 April 2023 and was replaced by Tony Cook.

Since July 2023, Bruniges has been the Chair of the Board and a non-executive director at the Australian Institute of Teaching and School Leadership.

== Honours ==
- Officer of the Order of Australia (AO), 26 January 2026.

For distinguished service to public administration, to education policy and teaching practice, and to addressing educational disadvantage.

- Member of the Order of Australia (AM), 26 January 2012.

For service to public administration through executive roles, and as a contributor to reform in the education sector at state and national levels.

- Presidential Citation, Australian Council for Educational Leaders (ACEL), 2011.

For high level leadership of public education.

- Fellow of the Australian College of Educators (FACE), 2009.

For a distinguished career in educational leadership and management and in particular valued and well respected contributions to school education sustained over many years.

- Churchill Fellowship, 2000.

To investigate ways to monitor, analyse and report progress in student achievement in the US and The Netherlands.

Government offices
Preceded by Lisa Paul	Secretary of the Department of Education, Skills and Employment; 2016–2023	Succeeded by Tony Cook
