= Helen Williams (Australian public servant) =

Australian public servant

Helen Williams AC

Secretary of the Department of Human Services
- In office 7 May 2007 – 2009

Secretary of the Department of Communications, Information Technology and the Arts
- In office 23 November 2001 – 7 May 2007

Commissioner of the Australian Public Service
- In office 1998–2002

Secretary of the Department of Immigration and Multicultural Affairs
- In office 11 March 1996 – 5 February 1998

Secretary of the Department of Tourism
- In office 14 June 1993 – 11 March 1996

Secretary of the Department of Education
- In office 14 January 1985 – 24 July 1987

Personal details
- Born: Helen Rodda Williams; 21 March 1945 (age 81) Adelaide, South Australia
- Spouse: Baron Friedrich von Reibnitz (m. 1979)
- Children: 1
- Occupation: Public servant

Helen Rodda Williams AC (born 21 March 1945) is a retired Australian senior public servant. She was the first woman in the Australian Public Service to be appointed as a secretary of an Australian government department.

== Early life ==
Helen Williams was born in Adelaide, South Australia on 21 March 1945, as the eldest of five daughters of academics Sir Bruce Williams and his wife, Roma Olive Hotten (1916-1992).

== Career ==
Early in her public service career, Williams joined the second division in the Department of Finance in 1979, her employment was controversial at the time due to her being a woman.

When she was promoted to Deputy Secretary in the Department of Education and Youth Affairs in 1983, she became the first woman to hold a deputy secretary position in the Australian Government sphere. She was Acting Secretary of the Department of Education and Youth Affairs for a short time in 1984, and was later promoted to Secretary of the Department of Education in 1985, serving in the role until 1987 Her appointment as Secretary of the education department was the first time a woman had been appointed to head an Australian Government department of state.

Williams told The Canberra Times in 2006 that in 1987 she was criticised by some women's groups and the senior public service bureaucracy when she took six months maternity leave after having her baby.

Williams returned to work from maternity leave in 1987 on the day that a reorganisation of the public service was complete, with 28 departments cut down to just 18. Williams was not one of the previous secretaries who was given a department and was instead appointed Associate Secretary in the Department of the Prime Minister and Cabinet. While Associate Secretary, she headed the arm of the department responsible for Commonwealth-state relations during Prime Minister Bob Hawke's push for "New Federalism", which saw the break-ups of functions between different layers of government under review.

In 1993, Williams was returned to a secretary role, this time as head of the Department of Tourism.

=== 1996 to 2009 ===
- Secretary of the Department of Immigration and Multicultural Affairs 1996–1998
- Public Service Commissioner 1998–2002
- Secretary of the Department of Communications, Information Technology and the Arts 2001–2007
- Secretary of the Department of Human Services 2007–2009

Williams retired from the Australian Public Service in 2009. The APS celebrated the 30th anniversary of her appointment in November 2015.

== Awards ==
Williams was appointed an Officer of the Order of Australia in June 1993 for service to public administration, particularly in the areas of education and social welfare. In 2001, Williams was awarded the Centenary Medal "for service as Secretary, Department of Communications, Information Technology and the Arts". On Australia Day 2019, Williams was appointed a Companion of the Order of Australia "for eminent service to public administration through senior advisory roles, and to policy reform and innovative program delivery".

== Private life ==
In 1979, Williams married Friedrich Baron von Reibnitz, a senior officer with the Australian Bureau of Statistics. He is an elder brother of Princess Michael of Kent and the only son of Günther Hubertus Freiherr von Reibnitz by his second wife, Countess Maria Anna Szapáry von Muraszombath, Széchysziget et Szapár. They have one daughter, born in 1986.

== Notes ==
Government offices
Preceded by Patricia Scott	Department of Human Services; 2007–2009	Succeeded by Finn Pratt
Preceded by Ian Watt	Secretary of the Department of Communications, Information Technology and the Arts; 2001–2007	Succeeded by Patricia Scott
Preceded by Peter Shergold	Commissioner of the Australian Public Service; 1998–2002	Succeeded by Andrew Podger
Preceded by Chris Conybeare as Secretary of the Department of Immigration and Ethnic Affairs	Secretary of the Department of Immigration and Multicultural Affairs; 1996–1998	Succeeded by Bill Farmer
Preceded by Geoff Miller	Secretary of the Department of Tourism; 1993–1996	Succeeded by Greg Taylor as Secretary of the Department of Industry, Science and Tourism
Preceded by Dick Johnson	Secretary of the Department of Education; 1985–1987	Succeeded by Vince FitzGerald as Secretary of the Department of Employment, Education and Training
Preceded by Peter Wilenski	Secretary of the Department of Education and Youth Affairs (Acting); 1983–1984	Succeeded by Dick Johnson
