= Jeff Harmer =

Jeff Harmer AO

Secretary of the Department of Families, Housing, Community Services and Indigenous Affairs
- In office 2007–2011

Secretary of the Department of Families, Community Services and Indigenous Affairs
- In office 2006–2007

Secretary of the Department of Family and Community Services
- In office 2004–2006

Secretary of the Department of Education, Science and Training
- In office 2003–2004

Personal details
- Born: Jeffrey Allan Harmer; 19 September 1949 (age 77) New South Wales
- Education: University of New South Wales (BA (Hons), DipEd, PhD)
- Occupation: Public servant

Jeffrey Allan 'Jeff' Harmer AO (born 19 September 1949) is a former senior Australian public servant. He was appointed Secretary of the Department of Education, Science and Training in 2003 and served in a series of Secretary-level roles until his retirement in December 2010.

== Life and career ==
Jeff Harmer was born on 19 September 1949 in country New South Wales. He attended Gundagai High School and then graduated from the University of New South Wales, attaining a Bachelor of Arts (with honours) and a Diploma of Education, and then was awarded a Doctor of Philosophy in the field of Urban Economic and Urban Geography.

Harmer began his Commonwealth Public Service career in 1978 at the Department of Environment, Housing and Community Development, starting on an 18-month contract.

Between 1998 and 2003, Harmer was head of the Health Insurance Commission (now Medicare Australia), after having served in various senior public sector positions, including as a Deputy Secretary at the Department of Social Security and at the Department of Housing and Regional Development. Harmer was appointed Secretary of the Department of Education, Science and Training in February 2003 and the following year, Harmer became instead Secretary of the Department of Family and Community Services.

Harmer retired from the public service in December 2010 after a public sector career that spanned over three decades.

In retirement, Harmer has served on the committee for Reform of the Australian Government's Housing Assistance Programs and the advisory group for the National Disability Insurance Scheme. In September 2016, he was recruited to also chair an advisory committee on private health insurance policy, reporting to the health minister Sussan Ley.

== Awards ==
Jeff Harmer was awarded an honorary doctorate from the University of Canberra in September 2012.

In 2009, Harmer was named the inaugural Federal Government Leader of the Year by the Institute of Chartered Accountants Australia. Harmer has also been awarded a Centenary Medal in 2001 and in 2010 was made an Officer of the Order of Australia.

Government offices
Preceded by Himself as Secretary of the Department of Families, Community Services and Indigenous Affairs	Secretary of the Department of Families, Housing, Community Services and Indigenous Affairs; 2007 – 2010	Succeeded by Finn Pratt
Preceded by Himself as Secretary of the Department of Family and Community Services	Secretary of the Department of Families, Community Services and Indigenous Affairs; 2006 – 2007	Succeeded by Himself as Secretary of the Department of Families, Housing, Community Services and Indigenous Affairs
Preceded by Mark Sullivan	Secretary of the Department of Family and Community Services; 2004 – 2006	Succeeded by Himself as secretary of the Department of Families, Community Services and Indigenous Affairs
Preceded by Wendy Jarvie (Acting)	Secretary of the Department of Education, Science and Training; 2003 – 2004	Succeeded by Lisa Paul
