= Dick Johnson (academic) =

Australian public servant (1929–2019)

Professor Dick Johnson

Secretary of the Department of Education
- In office 13 December 1984 – 14 January 1985

Secretary of the Department of Education and Youth Affairs
- In office 5 April 1984 – 13 December 1984

Personal details
- Born: Richard St Clair Johnson; 6 June 1929 Singapore
- Died: 31 August 2019 (aged 90) Canberra
- Spouse: Mary McAleer
- Children: 6
- Education: University of Sydney
- Occupation: Academic; Public servant

Richard St Clair Johnson (6 June 1929 – 31 August 2019) was an Australian academic and senior public servant.

== Background and early life ==
Dick Johnson was born in Singapore, one of four children born to Australian parents. His father worked in the insurance industry in Asia. He attended secondary schooling at the Jesuit Riverview College. In 1946 Johnson began a double honours degree in Greek and Latin at the University of Sydney.

== Career ==
Johnson was Professor of Classics at the Australian National University from 1962 to 1984. In his first year in the role, he established the Australian National University Classics Museum so that Canberra students could learn about ancient Greek and Roman objects.

In April 1984, Johnson was appointed Secretary of the Department of Education (later, Education and Youth Affairs). He left his role in January 1985, succeeded by Helen Williams, the first woman to become a departmental secretary in the Australian Government.

Government offices
Preceded by Himself as Secretary of the Department of Education and Youth Affairs	Secretary of the Department of Education; 1984 – 1985	Succeeded by Helen Williams
Preceded by Helen Williams (Acting)	Secretary of the Department of Education and Youth Affairs; 1984	Succeeded by Himself as Secretary of the Department of Education
