= The Australasian College Broadway =

The Australasian College Broadway is a privately operated educational institution situated in Sydney, Australia. It offers training programs specializing in beauty, makeup, and hairdressing. Established by Maureen Houssein-Mustafa in 1994, the college underwent administrative changes on 23 December 2016. In 2015, the college received funding exceeding $10.4 million from loans supported by taxpayers.

Located in Glebe, Sydney, the college's campus encompasses 8,000 square metres and has the potential to accommodate up to 1,000 students. However, as of December 23, there were 800 enrolled students, and according to data from the Federal Department of Education, only 73 students graduated.

In the year 2000, the college earned recognition as the first private registered training organisation to be honoured with the Training Provider of the Year award by the NSW Department of Education.

Currently, the college is the focus of an investigation by the NSW police regarding allegations concerning federal training loans claimed for graduates who may not have met the required skill levels. These ongoing police investigation is taking place concurrently with forensic accountants examining the company's financial records.
