= Ministry of Manpower =

Ministry of Manpower may refer to:

- Ministry of Manpower and Income Security (Quebec) in Canada
- Ministry of Manpower and Emigration (Egypt)
- Ministry of Manpower (Indonesia)
- Ministry of Manpower (Pakistan)
- Ministry of Manpower (Singapore)

== See also ==
- Ministry of Labour
