= Department of Education (Australia, 2013–14) =

Australian government department, 2013–2014

Department overview
- Formed: 18 September 2013
- Preceding Department: Department of Education, Employment and Workplace Relations
- Dissolved: 23 December 2014
- Superseding Department: Department of Education and Training (Australia)
- Jurisdiction: Commonwealth of Australia
- Headquarters: Canberra
- Ministers responsible: Christopher Pyne, Minister for Education; Simon Birmingham, Assistant Minister for Education; Scott Ryan, Parliamentary Secretary to the Minister for Education
- Department executive: Lisa Paul, Secretary
- Child Department: Shared Services Centre
- Website: www.education.gov.au

The Australian Department of Education was a department of the Australian Government charged with the responsibility for national policies and programs to help Australians access quality and affordable childcare; early childhood education, school education, post-school, higher education, international education and academic research. The head of the department was the Secretary of the Department of Education, Lisa Paul AO PSM, who reported to the Minister for Education, the Hon Christopher Pyne MP, the Assistant Minister for Education, the Hon Sussan Ley MP, and the Parliamentary Secretary to the Minister for Education, Senator the Hon Scott Ryan.

== History ==
The department was formed by way of an Administrative Arrangements Order issued on 18 September 2013 and replaced the functions previously performed by the Department of Education, Employment and Workplace Relations (DEEWR). DEEWR was formed in 2007 and absorbed the former Department of Education, Science and Training and the former Department of Employment and Workplace Relations.

The department was dissolved by way of an Administrative Arrangements Order issued on 23 December 2014 and superseded by the Department of Education and Training.

== Operational activities ==
The functions of the department were broadly classified into the following matters:

- Schools education policy and programs, including vocational education and training in schools, but excluding migrant adult education
- Schooling transitions policy and programs including career pathways
- Education and training transitions policy and programs
- Youth affairs and programs, including youth transitions
- Early childhood and childcare policy and programs
- Co-ordination of early childhood development policy and responsibilities
- Higher education policy, regulation and programs
- Policy, coordination and support for international education

== See also ==
- Minister for Education
- List of Australian Commonwealth Government entities
- Education in Australia
