= Employment National =

Australian Government organisation

Agency overview
- Formed: 1 April 1998
- Preceding agency: Commonwealth Employment Service
- Dissolved: 30 June 2003
- Jurisdiction: Commonwealth of Australia

Employment National was an Australian Government organisation tasked with assisting the unemployed receiving Newstart Allowance into employment. It was created as "Employment Assistance Australia" (EAA) by the Keating government's Employment Services Act 1994. It sought tenders for federal government funded employment work issued by the new "Employment Service Regulatory Agency" (ESRA). EAA largely operated out of Commonwealth Employment Service (CES) job centres.

Under the Howard government in 1998, the CES was abolished, ESRA became the Job Network, and EAA was renamed "Employment National". It was a large government-owned Job Agency competing with private ones, in this way being like Medibank Private was in the private health insurance sector during the period.

The agency and its final 165 offices were dissolved on 30 July 2003, with its functions being given to non-government Job Network providers.
