= Labshare =

Labshare consortium
- Mission statement: To create a nationally shared network of remote laboratories that will result in higher quality labs
- Commercial?: No
- Type of project: Engineering education
- Location: Australia
- Owner: Australian Government
- Founder: Prof David Lowe
- Established: Summer 2009
- Funding: $3.8m provided between the period of 2009–2011
- Website: www.labshare.edu.au/project

Labshare consortium is a laboratory sharing initiative established by the Federal Commonwealth of Australia Government's Department of Education, Employment and Workplace Relations by their Diversity and Structural Adjustment Fund awarded the five Australian Technology Network Universities: University of South Australia, Royal Melbourne Institute of Technology, University of Technology Sydney, Curtin University of Technology and Queensland University of Technology, which supported the national sharing of remote labs as a consortium of Australian Technology Network Universities who would share remote laboratories.

The University of South Australia was first to establish its NetLab remote lab in 2008.

== Related pages ==
- Remote laboratory
- Engineering law
- Engineering management
- Engineering education
- University of South Australia
- Australian Technology Network
