= Australian National University Classics Museum =

Museum in Australia

ANU Classics Museum
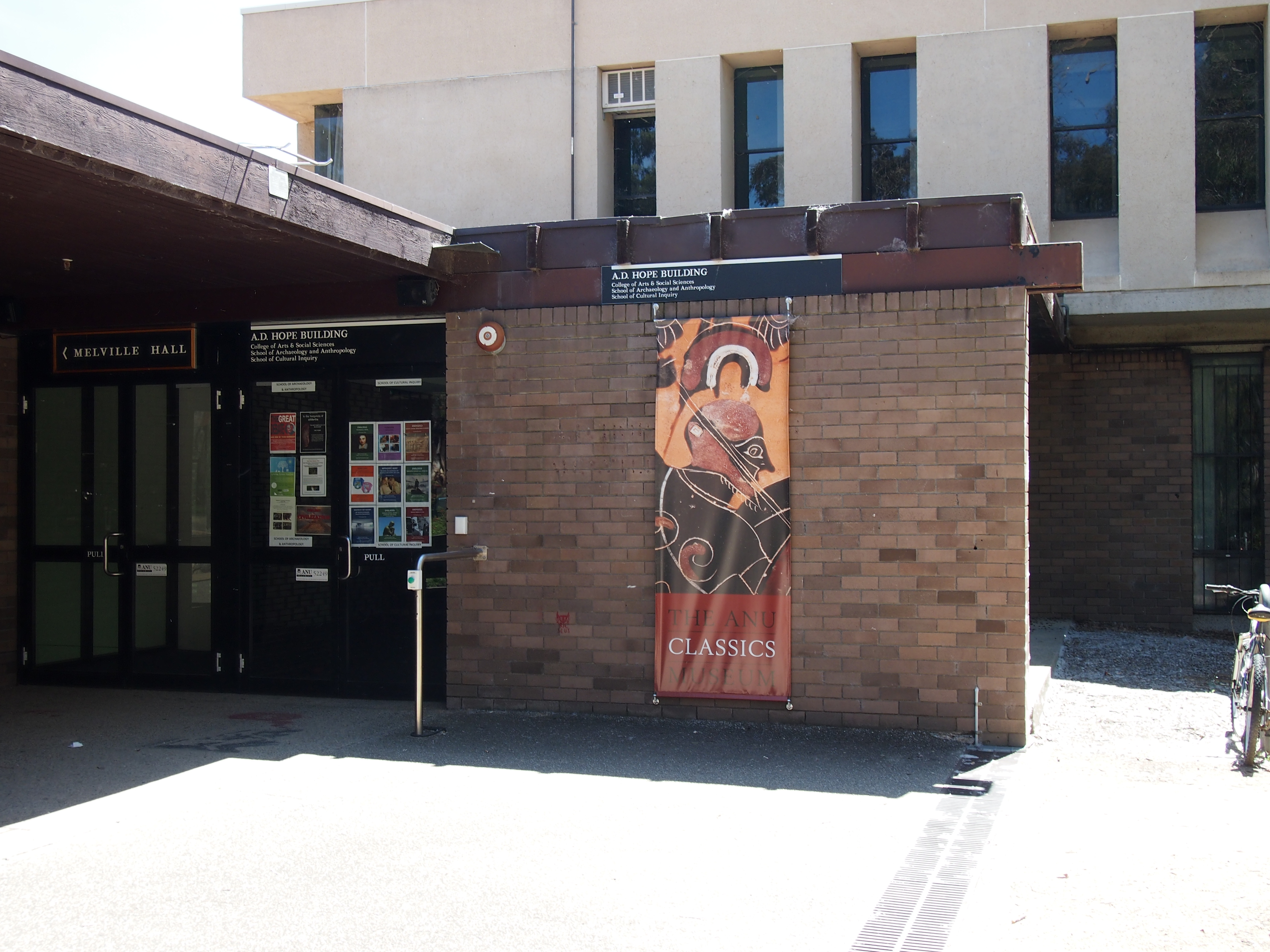
- The entrance to the AD Hope building, which houses the ANU Classics Museum
- Established: 1962
- Location: Canberra, Australia
- Coordinates: 35.27827°S 149.12172°E
- Type: Ancient Greece and Rome
- Owner: Australian National University
- Website: Official website

The Australian National University Classics Museum is a small museum in Canberra. It was established at the Australian National University (ANU) in 1962 as a teaching aid to help students in the Canberra region learn about the ancient Greek and Roman worlds.

== History ==
The ANU Classics Museum was founded in 1962 by Dick Johnson, the ANU's Professor of Classics. According to a 2011 article in The Canberra Times, Johnson established the museum "so Canberra students could learn about ancient Greek and Roman objects". The museum has been housed in the foyer of the AD Hope building at the ANU's main campus in Acton since the 1970s. A Friends of the ANU Classics Museum group was founded in 1985. By 2004 the museum had a collection of about 600 objects, including several on loan from private collectors and government agencies. Its single curator was reported to not have a regular budget.

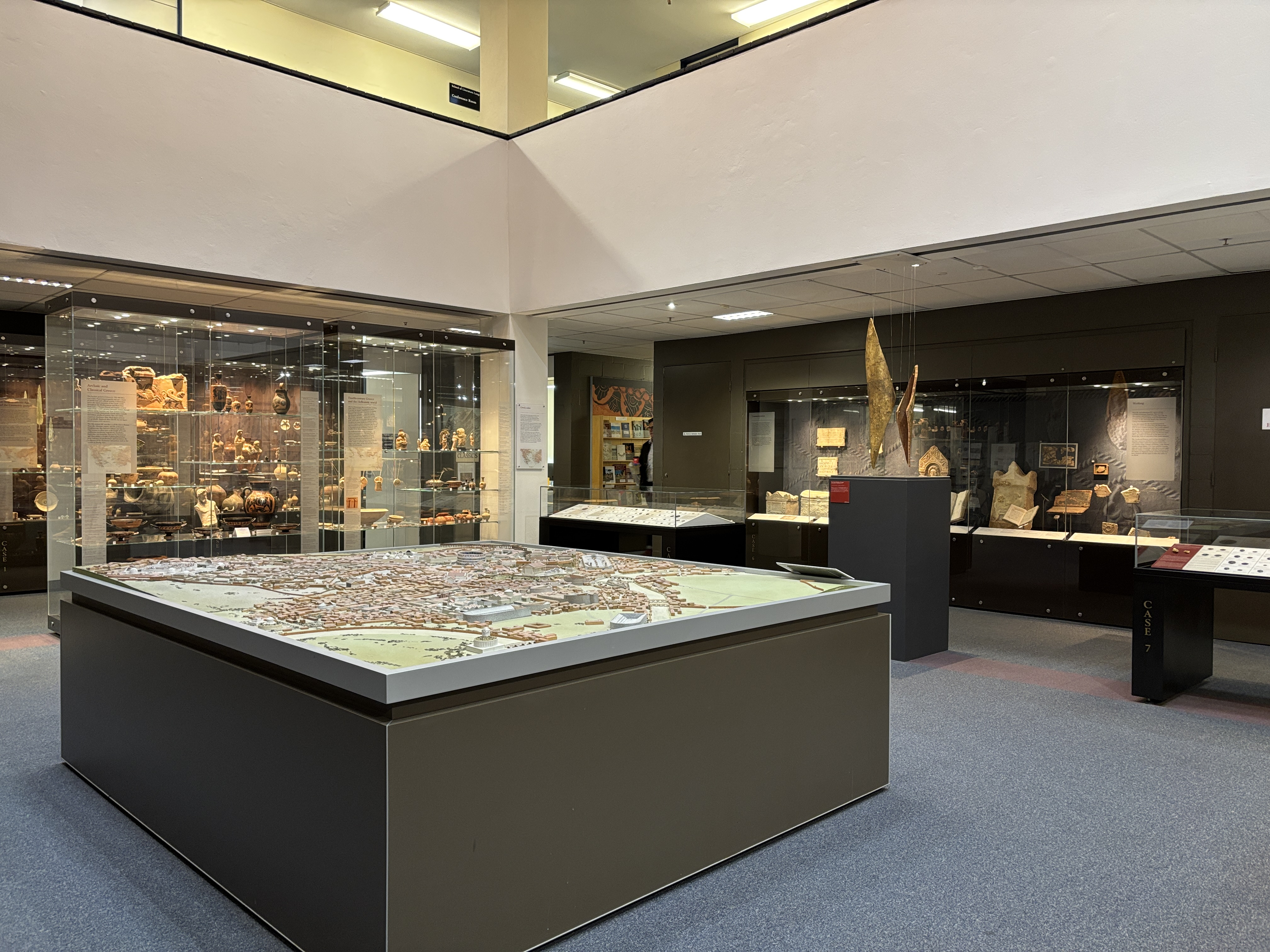
The interior of the museum in 2026

On 9 December 2004, it was discovered that five items had been stolen from a glass cabinet at the ANU Classics Museum. While the thieves had forced the cabinet open, there was reported to be no evidence that they had broken into the AD Hope building. The most valuable of the items taken was a bronze head which had once been the property of the Roman Emperor Augustus. This sculpture may have depicted Augustus' wife Livia. At the time of the theft the museum's security arrangements were limited to keeping the collection in locked cabinets and occasional patrols by ANU security guards. All the items in the collection had also been cataloged and photographed. Following the robbery, the Dean of the ANU's Faculty of Arts and an Sydney-based arts dealer speculated that the items may have been stolen to fill an order placed by an overseas collector.

A major refurbishment of the museum during 2010 included new display cases, captions and interpretative panels for items as well as improved lighting. It was reopened on 25 August by ANU Chancellor Gareth Evans. In October 2010, Professor Emerita Beryl Rawson, who had worked at the ANU for 45 years, including as Professor of Classics from 1989 to 1998, left a bequest of $400,000 to the ANU Classics Endowment Fund to support curatorial assistance in the museum and to fund other activities in the ANU Classics and Ancient History Program.

The museum continues to serve as a teaching museum. ANU students enrolled in ancient history and art history subjects are permitted to handle the 650 items in its collection. The museum is also open to the public during weekdays; guided tours may be arranged.

== Restitution ==
In September 2023, it was discovered that an amphora vase, a fish plate and a Roman marble portrait head were bought by the Museum throughout the 20th century "in good faith", however they were found to have been illegally excavated by its original dealers. The museum announced the objects' repatriation back to the Italian government after a four-year loan agreement for continued display and study in Australia, with the potential for another four-year extension.

Due to the risks associated with accidentally purchasing looted items and ethical concerns over the antiquities trade, it was reported in 2026 that the ANU Classics Museum no longer adds items to its collection. The museum's curator Dr Georgia Pike-Rowney told the ABC that this is not problematic, as its collection is sufficient to support classics education at the university. The ANU Classics Museum is also seeking to raise awareness about the market in illicit antiquities.
