= List of Australian Government entities =

This list of Australian Government entities includes ministerial departments, principal entities, secondary entities, and other entities, which are grouped into a number of areas of portfolio responsibility. Each portfolio is led by one or more government ministers who are members of the federal parliament, appointed by the governor-general on the advice of the prime minister.

As of December 2023, there are 1,334 government entities reportable to the Australian Government Organisations Register. This includes:

- 191 "principal" entities, including non-corporate Commonwealth entities (such as the 20 cabinet departments), corporate Commonwealth entities, and Commonwealth companies
- 693 "secondary" entities, such as advisory bodies, ministerial forums, and statutory offices
- 450 "other" entities, such as subsidiaries of government companies, joint ventures, national law bodies, and bodies linked through statutory contracts, agreements or delegations

== Principal entities ==
Principal entities are Australian Government entities that are defined in the Public Governance, Performance and Accountability Act 2011 as either a:

- Principal non-corporate Commonwealth entity - such as a cabinet department
- Principal corporate Commonwealth entity - such as the CSIRO or Reserve Bank of Australia
- Commonwealth company - such as NBN Co or Aboriginal Hostels Limited

=== Departments of State ===
As of 13 May 2025, the Australian Government comprises 16 Departments of State, each led by a Minister in the federal cabinet and leading its respective portfolio area:

- Attorney-General's Department
- Department of Agriculture, Fisheries and Forestry
- Department of Climate Change, Energy, the Environment and Water
- Department of Defence
- Department of Education
- Department of Employment and Workplace Relations
- Department of Finance
- Department of Foreign Affairs and Trade
- Department of Health, Disability and Ageing
- Department of Home Affairs
- Department of Industry, Science and Resources
- Department of Infrastructure, Transport, Regional Development, Communications, Sport and the Arts
- Department of the Prime Minister and Cabinet
- Department of Social Services
- Department of the Treasury
- Department of Veterans' Affairs

Separate to the 16 cabinet departments, there are also four parliamentary departments which are not cabinet portfolios:

- Department of the House of Representatives
- Department of Parliamentary Services
- Department of the Senate
- Parliamentary Budget Office

=== Other principal entities ===
There are 171 principal entities other than the cabinet departments. These government agencies are classified by the Australian Government Organisations Register as either a non-corporate Commonwealth entity, a corporate Commonwealth entity, or a Commonwealth company.

Non-Corporate Commonwealth Entities
Portfolio	Agencies
Agriculture, Fisheries and Forestry	Australian Fisheries Management Authority
Attorney-General's	Administrative Appeals Tribunal; Australian Criminal Intelligence Commission; Australian Financial Security Authority; Australian Institute of Criminology; Australian Law Reform Commission; Federal Court of Australia; National Anti-Corruption Commission; Office of Parliamentary Counsel; Office of the Australian Information Commissioner; Office of the Commonwealth Ombudsman; Office of the Director of Public Prosecutions; Office of the Inspector-General of Intelligence and Security; Office of the Special Investigator
Climate Change, Energy, the Environment and Water	Bureau of Meteorology; Clean Energy Regulator; Climate Change Authority; Great Barrier Reef Marine Park Authority
Defence	Australian Signals Directorate; Australian Submarine Agency
Education	Australian Research Council; Tertiary Education Quality and Standards Agency
Employment and Workplace Relations	Asbestos and Silica Safety and Eradication Agency; Australian Skills Quality Authority; Fair Work Commission; Office of the Fair Work Ombudsman; Safe Work Australia; Seafarers Safety, Rehabilitation and Compensation Authority
Finance	Australian Electoral Commission; Digital Transformation Agency; Future Fund Management Agency; Independent Parliamentary Expenses Authority; Parliamentary Workplace Support Service
Foreign Affairs and Trade	Australian Centre for International Agricultural Research; Australian Secret Intelligence Service; Austrade (Australian Trade and Investment Commission)
Health and Aged Care	Aged Care Quality and Safety Commission; Australian National Preventive Health Agency; Australian Radiation Protection and Nuclear Safety Agency; Cancer Australia; National Blood Authority; National Health and Medical Research Council; National Health Funding Body; National Mental Health Commission; Office of the Inspector-General of Aged Care; Organ and Tissue Authority; Professional Services Review; Sport Integrity Australia; Australian Centre for Disease Control
Home Affairs	Australian Federal Police; Australian Security Intelligence Organisation; Australian Transaction Reports and Analysis Centre; National Emergency Management Agency
Industry, Science and Resources	Geoscience Australia; IP Australia
Infrastructure, Transport, Regional Development, Communications and the Arts	Australian Communications and Media Authority; Australian Transport Safety Bureau; National Archives of Australia; National Capital Authority; High Speed Rail Authority
Prime Minister and Cabinet	Australian National Audit Office; Australian Public Service Commission; National Indigenous Australians Agency; Net Zero Economy Authority; Office of National Intelligence; Office of the Official Secretary to the Governor-General; Workplace Gender Equality Agency
Social Services	Australian Institute of Family Studies; Domestic, Family and Sexual Violence Commission; NDIS Quality and Safeguards Commission; Services Australia
Treasury	Australian Bureau of Statistics; Australian Competition and Consumer Commission; Australian Office of Financial Management; Australian Prudential Regulation Authority; Australian Securities and Investments Commission; Australian Taxation Office; Commonwealth Grants Commission; Inspector-General of Taxation; National Competition Council; Office of the Auditing and Assurance Standards Board; Office of the Australian Accounting Standards Board; Productivity Commission; Royal Australian Mint

Corporate Commonwealth Entities
Portfolio	Companies
Finance	Reserve Bank of Australia
Industry, Science and Resources	CSIRO

Commonwealth Companies
Portfolio	Companies
Climate Change, Energy, the Environment and Water	Snowy Hydro Ltd
Defence	AAF Company (Trustee of Army Amenities Fund and Messes Trust Fund); Australian Strategic Policy Institute Limited; RAAF Welfare Recreational Company; Defence Housing Australia
Education	Australian Institute for Teaching and School Leadership Limited
Finance	ASC Pty Ltd; Australian Naval Infrastructure Pty Ltd; Note Printing Australia
Health and Aged Care	Australian Sports Foundation Limited
Infrastructure, Transport, Regional Development, Communications and the Arts	Australian Rail Track Corporation Limited; Bundanon Trust; National Intermodal Corporation Limited; NBN Co Limited; WSA Co Limited; Australia Post; Airservices Australia
Prime Minister and Cabinet	Aboriginal Hostels Limited; National Australia Day Council Limited; Outback Stores Pty Ltd

== Other entities ==
- Australian Nuclear Science and Technology Organisation

== History of government departments ==
=== September 2013 ===
On 18 September 2013 an Administrative Arrangements Order was issued by the Governor-General on the recommendation of the Prime Minister Tony Abbott which replaced the previous Order of 14 September 2010 issued by the Governor-General on the recommendation of the Gillard government. The Order formed or re-confirmed government departments, as follows:

- The Department of Agriculture replacing the Department of Agriculture, Fisheries and Forestry
- The Attorney-General's Department, assuming the arts functions previously managed by the Department of Regional Australia, Local Government, Arts and Sport
- The Department of Communications replacing the Department of Broadband, Communications and the Digital Economy
- The Department of Defence
- The Department of Education replacing some of the functions of the Department of Education, Employment and Workplace Relations
- The Department of Employment replacing some of the function of the Department of Education, Employment and Workplace Relations
- The Department of the Environment replacing the Department of Climate Change and Energy Efficiency and the Department of Sustainability, Environment, Water, Population and Communities
- The Department of Finance replacing the Department of Finance and Deregulation
- The Department of Foreign Affairs and Trade, assuming the tourism functions previously managed by the Department of Resources, Energy and Tourism
- The Department of Health replacing the Department of Health and Ageing and assuming the sport functions previously managed by the Department of Regional Australia, Local Government, Arts and Sport
- The Department of Human Services
- The Department of Immigration and Border Protection replacing most of the functions of the Department of Immigration and Citizenship
- The Department of Industry replacing most of the functions of the Department of Innovation, Industry, Science and Research and the Department of Resources, Energy and Tourism
- The Department of Infrastructure and Regional Development replacing the Department of Infrastructure and Transport and most of the functions of the Department of Regional Australia, Local Government, Arts and Sport
- The Department of the Prime Minister and Cabinet, assuming the indigenous affairs functions previously managed by the Department of Families, Housing, Community Services and Indigenous Affairs
- The Department of Social Services replacing the majority of the functions of the Department of Families, Housing, Community Services and Indigenous Affairs
- The Department of the Treasury
- The Department of Veterans' Affairs

=== September 2015 ===
Following the appointment of Malcolm Turnbull as Prime Minister, three departments were renamed, with effect from 21 September 2015:

- The Department of Agriculture became the Department of Agriculture and Water Resources
- The Department of Industry and Science became the Department of Industry, Innovation and Science
- The Department of Communications became the Department of Communications and the Arts

=== July 2016 ===
Following the election of the Turnbull government, the Department of the Environment was renamed, with effect from 19 July 2016:

- The Department of the Environment became the Department of the Environment and Energy

=== December 2017 ===
Some departments were renamed, with effect from 20 December 2017:

- The Department of Employment became the Department of Jobs and Small Business
- The Department of Immigration and Border Protection became the Department of Home Affairs
- The Department of Infrastructure and Regional Development became the Department of Infrastructure, Regional Development and Cities

=== May 2019 ===
Following the election of the Morrison government, five departments were renamed, with effect from 29 May 2019:

- The Department of Agriculture and Water Resources became the Department of Agriculture
- The Department of Education and Training became the Department of Education
- The Department of Human Services became Services Australia.
- The Department of Jobs and Small Business became the Department of Employment, Skills, Small and Family Business
- The Department of Infrastructure, Regional Development and Cities became the Department of Infrastructure, Transport, Cities and Regional Development

=== February 2020 ===
The number of departments were cut from 18 to 14, with effect from 1 February 2020:

- The Department of Education and Department of Employment, Skills, Small and Family Business (except small business functions) merged to form the Department of Education, Skills and Employment
- The Department of Agriculture and environment functions of the Department of the Environment and Energy merged to form the Department of Agriculture, Water and the Environment
- The Department of Industry, Innovation and Science, energy functions from the Department of the Environment and Energy and small business functions from the Department of Employment, Skills, Small and Family Business merged to form the Department of Industry, Science, Energy and Resources
- The Department of Infrastructure, Transport, Cities and Regional Development and Department of Communications and the Arts merged to form the Department of Infrastructure, Transport, Regional Development and Communications
- Services Australia (the former Department of Human Services) was established as an executive agency within the Department of Social Services

=== July 2022 ===
The new Albanese government made the following modifications and increased the number of departments to 16, with effect from 1 July 2022:

- The Department of Agriculture, Water and the Environment was split into the Department of Agriculture, Fisheries and Forestry and the Department of Climate Change, Energy, the Environment and Water, with latter taking over energy functions from the Department of Industry, Science, Energy and Resources
- The Department of Education, Skills and Employment was split into the Department of Education and the Department of Employment and Workplace Relations
- The Department of Health was renamed the Department of Health and Aged Care
- The policing, criminal justice and protective services functions were transferred from the Department of Home Affairs to the Attorney-General's Department.
- The natural disaster management functions including the National Recovery and Resilience Agency were transferred from the Department of the Prime Minister and Cabinet to the Department of Home Affairs
- The Department of Industry, Science, Energy and Resources was renamed the Department of Industry, Science and Resources, with energy functions transferred to the Department of Climate Change, Energy, the Environment and Water
- The Department of Infrastructure, Transport, Regional Development and Communications was renamed the Department of Infrastructure, Transport, Regional Development, Communications and the Arts

=== May 2025 ===
The Albanese government renamed two departments, and transferred responsibilities between departments, with effect from 13 May 2025:

- The Department of Infrastructure, Transport, Regional Development, Communications and the Arts was renamed the Department of Infrastructure, Transport, Regional Development, Communications, Sport and the Arts, with sport and recreation policy and functions transferred from the Department of Health and Aged Care, while land and planning policy and cities and urban policy transferred to the Treasury
- The Department of Health and Aged Care was renamed the Department of Health, Disability and Ageing, with the National Disability Insurance Scheme and Foundational Supports transferred from the Department of Social Services
- Transfer of policies and operations between existing departments:
  - responsibility for law enforcement policy and operations transferred from the Attorney-General's Department to Department of Home Affairs
  - responsibility for bankruptcy, personal property securities and consumer credit reporting transferred from the Attorney-General's Department to the Treasury
  - housing, rental and homelessness policy from the Department of Social Services to the Treasury
  - construction industry policy and regulation from the Department of Industry, Science and Resources to the Treasury
  - transfers the Net Zero Economy Authority from the Department of the Prime Minister and Cabinet to the Department of Industry, Science and Resources

== See also ==
- Australian state equivalents
  - New South Wales government agencies
  - South Australian government departments
  - Tasmanian government departments
  - Victorian government agencies
  - Queensland government departments
  - Western Australian government agencies
