= Ministry of Labour and Social Security (Jamaica) =

Government ministry of Jamaica

The Ministry of Labour and Social Security of Jamaica oversees Social Security and Welfare, Education Affairs and Services, and Labour Relations Employment Services. The head offices of the labour and social security divisions are in Kingston.

As of 2020, the Minister of Labour and Social Security is The Honourable Karl Samuda CD, MP

== See also ==
- Other ministries of Labour
- Other ministries of Social Security
