= Remote laboratory =

Arrangement for conducting experiments at one location while situated at another

Remote laboratory (also known as online laboratory or remote workbench) is the use of telecommunications to remotely conduct real (as opposed to virtual) experiments, at the physical location of the operating technology, whilst the scientist is utilizing technology from a separate geographical location. Remote laboratory comprehends one or more remote experiments.

== Benefits ==
The benefits of remote laboratories are predominantly in engineering education:

- Relax time constraints, adapting to pace of each student, if there was insufficient time in lab
- Relax geographical constraints, disregarding the physical locality of the student
- Economies of scale, as sharing labs allows sharing of large fixed costs of traditional buildings
- Improve quality of experiment, as it can be repeated to clarify doubtful measurements in lab
- Improve effectiveness, as student may improve effectiveness of time spent at lab by rehearsal
- Improved safety and security, as no risk of catastrophic failure
- Learning Management systems this technology can be integrated into Moodle, one of the most used learning management system around the world.

== Disadvantages ==
The disadvantages differ depending on the type of remote laboratory and the topic area. The general disadvantages compared to a proximal (hands on) laboratory are:

- Lack of hands on trouble shooting and debugging experience.
- Lack of equipment setup experience.
- Lack of collaboration with others.
- High setup cost for the host of the remote lab.

== Future direction ==
Current system capabilities include:

- Online session booking, utilizing a database and online interface
- Authentication to satisfy security requirements
- Desktop, generalized screen for chat, emoticon, time limit, bandwidth limit
- Live lab camera which allows panning, tilting, zooming, showing, hiding, refresh
- Circuit builder (this is just simulative)
- Function generator (this is just simulative)
- Digital multimeter (this is just simulative)
- Oscilloscope (this is just simulative)

== Additional references ==
For India's virtual labs project, see Virtual Labs (India). For the online project "Virtual Laboratory. Essays and Resources on the Experimentalization of Life, 1830-1930," see Virtual Laboratory. These resources provide further opportunities for virtual experimentation and historical insights into the development of experimental techniques.
