= Department of Employment, Skills, Small and Family Business =

Australian government department, 2019–2020

Department overview
- Formed: 29 May 2019
- Preceding Department: Department of Jobs and Small Business
- Dissolved: 1 February 2020
- Superseding agencies: Department of Education, Skills and Employment; Department of Industry, Science, Energy and Resources
- Jurisdiction: Commonwealth of Australia
- Minister responsible: Michaelia Cash, Minister for Employment, Skills, Small and Family Business
- Department executive: Kerri Hartland, Secretary
- Website: www.jobs.gov.au

The Australian Department of Employment, Skills, Small and Family Business was a short-lived department of the Australian Government in existence between 2019 and 2020, charged with the responsibility for employment, job services and the labour market, small business, and deregulation. The department was established on 29 May 2019 and reported to the Minister for Employment, Skills, Small and Family Business, Senator the Hon. Michaelia Cash. The head of the department was the Secretary of the previous Department of Jobs and Small Business, Kerri Hartland.

Some of the election commitments of the Morrison Government which the department had oversight of implementing, following the 2019 election, included the creation of 1.25 million jobs, 250,000 new small businesses and 80,000 apprenticeships over 5 years.

The department, except its small business functions, merged with the Department of Education to form the Department of Education, Skills and Employment on 1 February 2020. The small business functions of the department was absorbed by the new Department of Industry, Science, Energy and Resources. Secretary Hartland was sacked as a result of the administrative changes.

== See also ==
- Minister for Employment, Skills, Small and Family Business
- List of Australian Commonwealth Government entities
