= Department of Education (1984–1987) =

Australian government department, 1984–1987

Department overview
- Formed: 13 December 1984
- Preceding Department: Department of Immigration and Ethnic Affairs (I) – for matters relating to overseas students Department of Education and Youth Affairs – for education other than migrant adult education
- Dissolved: 24 July 1987
- Superseding Department: Department of the Arts, Sport, the Environment, Tourism and Territories – for the Canberra College of Advanced Education Act 1967 and the remainder of the Commonwealth Teaching Service Act 1972 Department of Employment, Education and Training – for education other than migrant adult education; ACT local education
- Jurisdiction: Commonwealth of Australia
- Headquarters: Canberra
- Minister responsible: Susan Ryan, Minister
- Department executives: Dick Johnson, Secretary (1984–1985); Helen Williams, Secretary (1985–1987)

The Department of Education was an Australian government department that existed between December 1984 and July 1987. It was the second so-named Australian government department.

== Scope ==
Information about the department's functions and government funding allocation could be found in the Administrative Arrangements Orders, the annual Portfolio Budget Statements and in the department's annual reports.

According to the National Archives of Australia, at its creation, the department was responsible for education, other than migrant adult education.

== Structure ==
The department was an Australian Public Service department, staffed by officials who were responsible to the Minister for Education, Susan Ryan.

The department was headed by a secretary, initially Dick Johnson (1984‑1985) and subsequently Helen Williams (1985‑1987). When Williams earned her secretary appointment, she was the first woman to be elevated to a position at the head of an Australian government department.
