= Department of Education and Youth Affairs =

Australian government department, 1983–1984

Department overview
- Formed: 11 March 1983
- Preceding Department: Department of Education (I)
- Dissolved: 13 December 1984
- Superseding Department: Department of Education (II) – for education other than migrant adult education Department of the Prime Minister and Cabinet – for youth affairs
- Jurisdiction: Commonwealth of Australia
- Headquarters: Phillip, Canberra
- Minister responsible: Susan Ryan, Minister
- Department executives: Kenneth Norman Jones, Secretary (1983); Peter Wilenski, Secretary (1983); Helen Williams, Acting Secretary (1983–1984); Dick Johnson, Secretary (1984)

The Department of Education and Youth Affairs was an Australian government department that existed between March 1983 and December 1984.

== History ==
The Department was established by the Hawke government in March 1983, a renaming of the Department of Education in view of significant changes to departmental functions following the federal election of that month.

== Scope ==
Information about the department's functions and government funding allocation could be found in the Administrative Arrangements Orders, the annual Portfolio Budget Statements and in the Department's annual reports.

The functions of the Department at its creation were:

- Education, other than migrant adult education
- Youth affairs

== Structure ==
The Department was a Commonwealth Public Service department, staffed by officials who were responsible to the Minister for Education and Youth Affairs.
