= Department of Employment and Workplace Relations (2001–2007) =

Australian government department, 2001–2007

Department overview
- Formed: 26 November 2001
- Preceding Department: Department of Employment, Workplace Relations and Small Business
- Dissolved: 3 December 2007
- Superseding Department: Department of Education, Employment and Workplace Relations
- Jurisdiction: Commonwealth of Australia
- Headquarters: Canberra
- Department executive: Peter Boxall, Secretary
- Website: dewr.gov.au

The Department of Employment and Workplace Relations (also called DEWR) was an Australian government department that existed between November 2001 and December 2007.

== Scope ==
Information about the department's functions and government funding allocation could be found in the Administrative Arrangements Orders, the annual Portfolio Budget Statements, in the department's annual reports and on the department's website.

According to the Administrative Arrangements Order made on 26 November 2001, the department dealt with:

- Employment policy, including employment services
- Job Network
- Labour market programs, including the Work for the Dole scheme
- Workplace relations policy development, advocacy and implementation
- Promotion of flexible workplace relations policies and practices
- Co-ordination of labour market research
- Australian government employment workplace relations policy, including administration of the framework for agreement making and remuneration and conditions
- Occupational health and safety, rehabilitation and compensation
- Equal employment opportunity
- Work and family issues

== Structure ==
The department was an Australian Public Service department, staffed by officials who were responsible to the Minister for Employment and Workplace Relations. The secretary of the department was Peter Boxall.
