= Workforce Australia =

Australian government unemployment service

- Logo of Workforce Australia
- Formation: 1 July 2022; 4 years ago
- Parent organization: Department of Employment and Workplace Relations
- Website: workforceaustralia.gov.au
- Formerly called: jobactive

Workforce Australia is an Australian Government-funded network of organisations (private and community, and originally also government) that are contracted by the Australian Government, through the Department of Employment and Workplace Relations (DEWR), to deliver employment services to unemployed job seekers on Government income support payments and employers.

Providers were initially selected for the network and allocated business through a competitive public tender process, with contract periods running for varying lengths of time determined by the Australian Government. There were over 1,000 sites across Australia delivering Job Services Australia.

To be eligible for support, people need to be in receipt of eligible income support payments, such as Newstart Allowance, Youth Allowance, the Disability Support Pension or Parenting Payment.

== History ==
The Keating government's Employment Services Act 1994 established the Employment Service Regulatory Agency (ESRA). According to policy document "Working Nation", ESRA was created to "promote the development of community and private sector case managers and to ensure fair competition between the CES and other agencies." However, the new act created what would later be known as Employment National to take the role here allocated to the CES (Commonwealth Employment Service). At this time the CES delivered almost all federally funded employment services, however over time more and more funding was allocated to ESRA to put out to tender.

The new Howard government elected in 1996 continued Keating's structural reforms. On April 1, 1998, the CES was dissolved, and its remaining employment services were vested with ESRA. Simultaneously, ESRA became known as the Job Network. The delivery of employment services was tendered out to Job Agencies whose primary responsibility was to assist people into work. Most of these Job Agencies were owned by private or charity organisations, however Employment National was a large one owned by the federal government. Employment National was dissolved in 2003, its work given to other Job Agencies.

In 2009, the Rudd government renamed Job Network as Job Services Australia.

The services provided by Job Services Australia differed according to the level of disadvantage of the job seeker, circumstances or the allowance they were receiving from Centrelink. Services include:

- Stream 1 (Limited): Job Services Australia assists in creating an online resume for the purpose of applying for jobs through DEEWR's online Australian JobSearch (AJS) website, and automatically matching the job seeker's knowledge, skills and experience to new jobs that are available.
- Stream 1: This part of the JSA model includes Intensive Activities, where job seekers participate in activities to develop their skills in resume development, application writing, cold canvassing, goal setting, career planning, interview techniques, job search and work experience.
- Stream 2 & 3: These job seekers are experiencing moderate and significant disadvantage (respectively). Job seekers will enter into an Employment Pathway Plan (EPP) which will include activities and assistance aimed at improving the job seekers' employability. The focus will be on addressing the vocational and non-vocational needs of the job seeker.
- Stream 4: These job seekers are assessed as having the most severe levels of disadvantage and may be affected by such things as mental health, disability, homelessness, abuse, drug/alcohol etc. JSA providers will work with the job seeker to address their most pressing issues/barriers first. The aim is to achieve employment, however this may take some time.
- Work Experience: This phase usually begins for a job seeker after 12 months in a particular stream. In the work experience phase, job seekers who are eligible are required to participate in a work experience activity on an annual basis. Work experience activities could include Work for the Dole, Green Corp, Volunteer Work, Part Time Work, Part Time Study, Unpaid Work Experience, Participation in Government Programs or Non-Vocational Activities.

The Abbott government renamed the network jobactive on 1 July 2015.

Employment Service Providers interface with the network through ESSWeb, the Employment Services System.

=== Workforce Australia and New Employment Services Model (NESM) ===
The New Employment Services Model replaced the previous jobactive network on 1 July 2022. Under the system, significant emphasis is placed on moving digitally literate job seekers away from "Employment Service Providers" towards a web based self-service obligations scheme. In addition to these changes, the controversial "Job Search Effort" mutual obligations work test, in which job seekers were required to apply for 20 jobs a month, was replaced with the "Points Based Activation System". This new system requires most job seekers to achieve 100 points a month, with a single job application counting for 5 points. Functionally this still requires one to apply for 20 jobs a month, except now other activities (like full time study) can also contribute to a job seeker's mutual obligations.

== Contracts and performance ratings ==
- Contract 1 1998–2000
- Contract 2 2000–2003
  - Major providers were Mission Australia, The Salvation Army and Wesley Mission
- Contract 3 2003–2006
- Contract 3 Extension 2006–2009
- JSA Deed 2009–2012

Job Services Australia agencies were rated by DEEWR every six months (or milestone) on performance, based on placing clients into work and keeping them employed for 13 and/or 26 weeks. A Star Rating system was used, ranging from one to five stars; five stars indicate the highest level of performance.

The ratings were calculated using a regression model that looked at the number of jobs or outcomes that a site achieved. As the details of the model have not been released, agencies were often unsure what their next rating will be.

== Third party provider contracts ==
Provider	Value (million)
Serendipity (WA) Pty Ltd (also known as APM)	$334.9m
Workskil Australia Ltd.	$266.4m
AtWork Australia Pty Ltd	$226.6m
The Trustee for The Salvation Army (Victoria) Property Trust	$190.7m
MAX Solutions Pty Ltd	$147.7m
Enterprise & Training Company Limited	$128.3m
Karingal St Laurence Limited (Matchworks)	$127.4m
Job Futures Ltd	$123.9m
WISE Employment Ltd	$123.6m
SYC Ltd	$120.4m
Asuria People Services Pty Limited	$115.9m
RNTT Pty Ltd (Jobs Statewide)	$114m
Teldraw Pty. Limited (Global Skills)	$83.3m
Tursa Employment & Training Limited	$81.9m
Sureway Employment and Training Pty Ltd	$80.8m
Sarina Russo Job Access (Australia) PTY. LTD.	$76.7m
Joblink Plus Limited	$75.6m
AMES Australia	$74.8m
Jobfind Centres Australia Pty Ltd	$68.3m
CVGT Australia Limited	$67.8m
Inner Northern Group Training Limited	$65.6m
VERTO Ltd	$59.1m
MTC Australia Limited	$50m
On-Q Human Resources Limited	$48.1m
Workways Australia Limited	$43.5m
BEST Employment Limited	$39.2m
MADEC Australia	$37.5m
The Trustee for Designer Life (Queensland) Trust	$37.3m
Family Services Illawarra Limited	$32.9m
Impact Services Pty Ltd	$32m
MEGT (Australia) Ltd	$30.5m
Mareeba Shire Job Training Assoc Inc	$26.5m
Westgate Community Initiatives Group Ltd.	$26.4m
AimBig Employment Pty Ltd	$21.7m
Workskills Incorporated	$20.1m
Jobs Australia Enterprises Ltd	$15.1m
Individual Empowerment Network Pty Ltd	$14m
Workpac Employment Services Pty Ltd	$9.6m
Western District Employment Access Incorporated	$8m
NSWALC Employment and Training Ltd	$7.7m
Nirrumbuk Aboriginal Corporation	$4.6m
Training Alliance Group Australia Pty Ltd	$3m
The Wirrpanda Foundation Limited	$2.4m
Total (billion)	$3.26b

== Third party job agency training contracts ==
Providers can claim further funds by referring jobseekers to their own courses

Provider	Value (nillion)	Program
Serendipity (WA) Pty Ltd (Also known as APM)	$334.9m	Workforce Australia Licence(s) to deliver Generalist, CALD and Indigenous services
Serendipity (WA) Pty Ltd (Also known as APM)	$66.9m	Employability Skills Training Deed 2022–2027
Workskil Australia Ltd.	$266.4m	Workforce Australia Licence(s) to deliver Generalist and Ex-Offender services
Workskil Australia Ltd	$1.0m	Career Transition Assistance Deed 2022–27
MAX Solutions Pty Ltd	$147.7m	Workforce Australia Licence(s) to deliver Generalist and Ex-Offender services
Max Solutions Pty Ltd	$16.5m	Employability Skills Training Deed 2022–2027
Enterprise & Training Company Limited	$128.4m	Workforce Australia Licence(s) to deliver Generalist services
Enterprise & Training Company Limited	$3.2m	Career Transition Assistance Deed 2022–27
Enterprise & Training Company Limited	$3.2m	Career Transition Assistance Deed 2022–27
Karingal St Laurence Limited (Matchworks)	$127.5m	Workforce Australia Licence(s) to deliver Generalist services
Karingal St Laurence Limited	$5.2m	Employability Skills Training Deed 2022–2027
Karingal St Laurence Limited	$5.2m	Employability Skills Training Deed 2022–2027
WISE Employment Ltd	$123.7m	Workforce Australia Licence(s) to deliver Generalist, CALD and Ex-Offender services
Wise Employment Ltd	$25.9m	Employability Skills Training Deed 2022–2027
SYC Ltd	$120.5m	Workforce Australia Licence(s) to deliver Generalist services
SYC Ltd	$15.3m	Employability Skills Training Deed 2022–2027
SYC Ltd	$15.3m	Employability Skills Training Deed 2022–2027
RNTT Pty Ltd (Jobs Statewide)	$114.1m	Workforce Australia Licence(s) to deliver Generalist services
RNTT Pty Ltd	$23.7m	Employability Skills Training Deed 2022–2027
RNTT Pty Ltd	$0.65m	Career Transition Assistance Deed 2022–27
Teldraw Pty. Limited (Global Skills)	$83.4m	Workforce Australia Licence(s) to deliver Generalist and Ex-Offender services
Teldraw Pty Limited	$0.44m	Career Transition Assistance Deed 2022–27
Sureway Employment and Training Pty Ltd	$80.8m	Workforce Australia Licence(s) to deliver Generalist services
Sureway Employment and Training Pty Ltd	$1.1m	Career Transition Assistance Deed 2022–27
Sarina Russo Job Access (Australia) PTY. LTD.	$76.7m	Workforce Australia Licence(s) to deliver Generalist, CALD and Refugee services
Sarina Russo Schools Australia Pty Ltd	$36.2m	Employability Skills Training Deed 2022–2027
Sarina Russo Schools Australia Pty Ltd	$2.5m	Career Transition Assistance Deed 2022–27
Joblink Plus Limited	$75.7m	Workforce Australia Licence(s) to deliver Generalist, Ex-Offender and Indigenous services
Joblink Plus Limited	$10.7m	Employability Skills Training Deed 2022–2027
Jobfind Centres Australia Pty Ltd	$68.3m	Workforce Australia Licence(s) to deliver Generalist services
Jobfind Centres Australia Pty Ltd	$19.8m	Employability Skills Training Deed 2022–2027
Jobfind Centres Australia Pty Ltd	$1.1m	Career Transition Assistance Deed 2022–27
Inner Northern Group Training Limited	$65.7m	Workforce Australia Licence(s) to deliver Generalist services
Inner Northern Group Training Limited	$14.9m	Employability Skills Training Deed 2022–2027
Inner Northern Group Training Limited	$1.1m	Career Transition Assistance Deed 2022–27
MTC Australia Limited	$50.1m	Workforce Australia Licence(s) to deliver Generalist services
MTC Australia Limited	$24.5m	Employability Skills Training Deed 2022–2027
MTC Australia Limited	$0.45m	Career Transition Assistance Deed 2022–27
The Trustee for Designer Life (Queensland) Trust	$37.3m	Workforce Australia Licence(s) to deliver Generalist services
The Trustee for Designer Life (Queensland) Trust	$2.0m	Career Transition Assistance Deed 2022–27
Jobs Australia Enterprises Ltd	$15.2m	Workforce Australia Licence(s) to deliver Generalist services
Jobs Australia Enterprises Ltd	$0.21m	Employability Skills Training Deed 2022–2027
Western District Employment Access Incorporated	$8.1m	Workforce Australia Licence(s) to deliver Generalist services
Western District Employment Access Inc.	$7.3m	Employability Skills Training Deed 2022–2027
Western District Employment Access Incorporated	$0.19m	Career Transition Assistance Deed 2022–27
Workskil Australia Ltd	$1.0m	Career Transition Assistance Deed 2022–27
Total (billion)	$2.23b	

== Industry-related organisations ==
The peak industry bodies for Workforce Australia members are the National Employment Services Association (NESA) which represents providers who are for-profit, not for profit and charities, and Jobs Australia, which represents the not-for-profit sector. These bodies represent the needs and wishes of the employment services sector to the Australian Government.

Professional development within the industry was provided by organisations including NESA and others such as Diversity@Work, Duality, Job Services Central and Work Savvy Parents to ensure staff were up to date with policies and procedures..
