= Department of Education, Training and Youth Affairs =

Australian government department, 1998–2001

Department overview
- Formed: 21 October 1998
- Preceding Department: Department of Employment, Education, Training and Youth Affairs
- Dissolved: 26 November 2001
- Superseding Department: Department of Education, Science and Training
- Jurisdiction: Commonwealth of Australia
- Headquarters: Canberra
- Minister responsible: David Kemp, Minister for Education, Training and Youth Affairs
- Department executive: Steve Sedgwick, Secretary
- Website: detya.gov.au

The Department of Education, Training and Youth Affairs was an Australian government department that existed between October 1998 and November 2001.

== Scope ==
Information about the department's functions and government funding allocation could be found in the Administrative Arrangements Orders, the annual Portfolio Budget Statements, in the Department's annual reports and on the Department's website.

According to the Administrative Arrangements Order made on 21 October 1998, the Department dealt with:

- Education, other than migrant education
- Youth affairs
- Training, including New Apprenticeships and training services
- Co-ordination of research policy
- Research grants and fellowships

== Structure ==
The Department was an Australian Public Service department, staffed by officials who were responsible to the Minister for Education, Training and Youth Affairs, David Kemp.
