= Department of Education, Science and Training =

Australian government department, 2001–2007

Department overview
- Formed: 26 November 2001
- Preceding Department: Department of Education, Training and Youth Affairs
- Dissolved: 3 December 2007
- Superseding Department: Department of Education, Employment and Workplace Relations Department of Innovation, Industry, Science and Research
- Jurisdiction: Commonwealth of Australia
- Headquarters: Canberra
- Minister responsible: Brendan Nelson, Minister for Education, Science and Training
- Department executives: Steve Sedgwick, Secretary (2001–02); Peter Shergold, Secretary (2002–03); Wendy Jarvie, Acting Secretary (2003); Jeff Harmer, Secretary (2003–04); Lisa Paul, Secretary (2004–07)
- Website: dest.gov.au

The Department of Education, Science and Training (also called DEST) was an Australian government department that existed between November 2001 and December 2007.

== Scope ==
Information about the department's functions and government funding allocation could be found in the Administrative Arrangements Orders, the annual Portfolio Budget Statements, in the Department's annual reports and on the Department's website.

According to the Administrative Arrangements Order made on 26 November 2001, the Department dealt with:

- Education, other than migrant adult education
- Science policy
- Promotion of collaborative research in science and technology
- Training, including new apprenticeships and training services
- Co-ordination of research policy
- Research grants and fellowships
- Radioactive waste management

== Structure ==
The Department was an Australian Public Service department, staffed by officials who were responsible to the Minister for Education, Science and Training, Brendan Nelson.

Lisa Paul was appointed the Department's Secretary in October 2004.
