= Department of Employment, Workplace Relations and Small Business =

Australian government department, 1998–2001

Department overview
- Formed: 21 October 1998
- Preceding Department: Department of Employment, Education, Training and Youth Affairs Department of Workplace Relations and Small Business
- Dissolved: 26 November 2001
- Superseding Department: Department of Employment and Workplace Relations Department of Industry, Tourism and Resources
- Jurisdiction: Commonwealth of Australia
- Headquarters: Canberra
- Ministers responsible: Peter Reith, Minister (1998–2001); Tony Abbott, Minister (2001)
- Department executive: Peter Shergold, Secretary

The Department of Employment, Workplace Relations and Small Business was an Australian government department that existed between October 1998 and November 2001.

== Scope ==
Information about the department's functions and government funding allocation could be found in the Administrative Arrangements Orders, the annual Portfolio Budget Statements, in the department's annual reports and on the Department's website.

At its creation, the department was responsible for the following:

- Employment policy, including employment services
- Job Network
- Labour market programs, including the Work for the Dole scheme
- Workplace relations policy development, advocacy and implementation
- Promotion of flexible workplace relations policies and practices
- Small business policy and implementation, including business entry point management
- Co-ordination of labour market research
- Australian government employment pay and conditions
- Occupational health and safety, rehabilitation and compensation
- Notification and assessment of industrial chemicals
- Affirmative action
- Work and family issues

== Structure ==
The department was an Australian Public Service department, staffed by officials who were responsible to the Minister for Employment, Workplace Relations and Small Business.
