= Department of Employment, Education, Training and Youth Affairs =

Australian government department, 1996–1998

Department overview
- Formed: 11 March 1996
- Preceding Department: Department of Employment, Education and Training
- Dissolved: 21 October 1998
- Superseding Department: Department of Education, Training and Youth Affairs Department of Employment, Workplace Relations and Small Business
- Jurisdiction: Commonwealth of Australia
- Headquarters: City, Canberra
- Ministers responsible: Amanda Vanstone, Minister (1996–1997); David Kemp, Minister (1997–1998)
- Department executives: Sandy Hollway, Secretary (1996); Steve Sedgwick, Secretary (1997–1998)

The Department of Employment, Education, Training and Youth Affairs was an Australian government department that existed between March 1996 and October 1998.

== Scope ==
Information about the department's functions and government funding allocation could be found in the Administrative Arrangements Orders, the annual Portfolio Budget Statements, in the Department's annual reports and on the Department's website.

At its creation, the Department was responsible for the following:

- Education, other than migrant adult education
- Youth affairs
- Employment and training
- Commonwealth Employment Service
- Labour market programs
- Co-ordination of research policy
- Research grants and fellowship

== Structure ==
The Department was an Australian Public Service department, staffed by officials who were responsible to the Minister for Employment, Education, Training and Youth Affairs.
