= Department of Employment, Education and Training =

Australian government department, 1987–1996

Department overview
- Formed: 24 July 1987
- Preceding Department: Department of Employment and Industrial Relations (II) – for employment, training, labour market programs and the Commonwealth Employment Service Department of Education (II) – for education other than migrant adult education Department of Science (III) – for research functions
- Dissolved: 11 March 1996
- Superseding Department: Department of Employment, Education, Training and Youth Affairs
- Jurisdiction: Commonwealth of Australia
- Ministers responsible: John Dawkins, Minister (1987–1991); Kim Beazley, Minister (1991–1993); Simon Crean, Minister (1993–1996)
- Department executives: Vince FitzGerald, Secretary (1987–1989); Greg Taylor, Secretary (1989–1993); Derek Volker, Secretary (1993–1996)

The Department of Employment, Education and Training (DEET) was an Australian government department that existed between July 1987 and March 1996.

== Scope ==
Information about the department's functions and government funding allocation could be found in the Administrative Arrangements Orders, the annual Portfolio Budget Statements and in the Department's annual reports.

At its creation, the Department was responsible for the following:

- Education, other than migrant adult education
- Youth Affairs
- Employment and training
- Commonwealth Employment Service
- Labour market programs
- Co-ordination of research policy
- Research grants and fellowships

== Structure ==
The Department was an Australian Public Service department, staffed by officials who were responsible to the Minister for Employment, Education and Training.
