= Department of Education, Employment and Workplace Relations =

Australian government department, 2007–2013

Department overview
- Formed: 3 December 2007
- Preceding Department: Department of Education, Science and Training Department of Employment and Workplace Relations
- Dissolved: 18 September 2013
- Superseding Department: Department of Education Department of Employment
- Jurisdiction: Commonwealth of Australia
- Employees: 4,122 (at April 2013)
- Department executive: Lisa Paul, Secretary
- Website: DEEWR website

The Australian Department of Education, Employment and Workplace Relations (DEEWR) was a department of the Government of Australia.

It was formed in 2007 and absorbed the former departments of Education, Science and Training, and Employment and Workplace Relations. As a result of an Administrative Arrangements Order issued on 18 September 2013, the Department of Education and the Department of Employment were created out of the former Department of Education, Employment and Workplace Relations.

== Scope ==
In the Administrative Arrangements Order of 3 December 2007, the functions of the department were broadly classified into the following matters:

- Primary and secondary-level education policy and programs
- Science awareness programs in schools
- Income support policies and programs for students and apprentices
- Employment policy, including employment services
- Job Services Australia
- Labour market and income support policies and programs for people of working age
- Workplace relations policy development, advocacy and implementation
- Promotion of flexible workplace relations policies and practices
- Co-ordination of labour market research
- Australian government employment workplace relations policy, including administration of the framework for agreement making and remuneration and conditions
- Occupational health and safety, rehabilitation and compensation
- Equal employment opportunity
- Work and family programs
- Services to help people with disabilities obtain employment, other than supported employment
- Youth affairs and programs, excluding income support policies and programs
- Early childhood and childcare policy and programs

The department assisted in the commercialisation of Australian remote laboratories in higher education, injecting funds into the sector, supporting the foundation of the Labshare project.
