= Department secretary =

Leading public servant of a government department in Australia

Departmental secretary
Occupation
- Names: Secretary
- Occupation type: Public servant
- Activity sectors: Australian Government and state and territory governments

Description
- Competencies: Strategic advice; Public administration
- Related jobs: Government minister; Director general; Chief executive officer

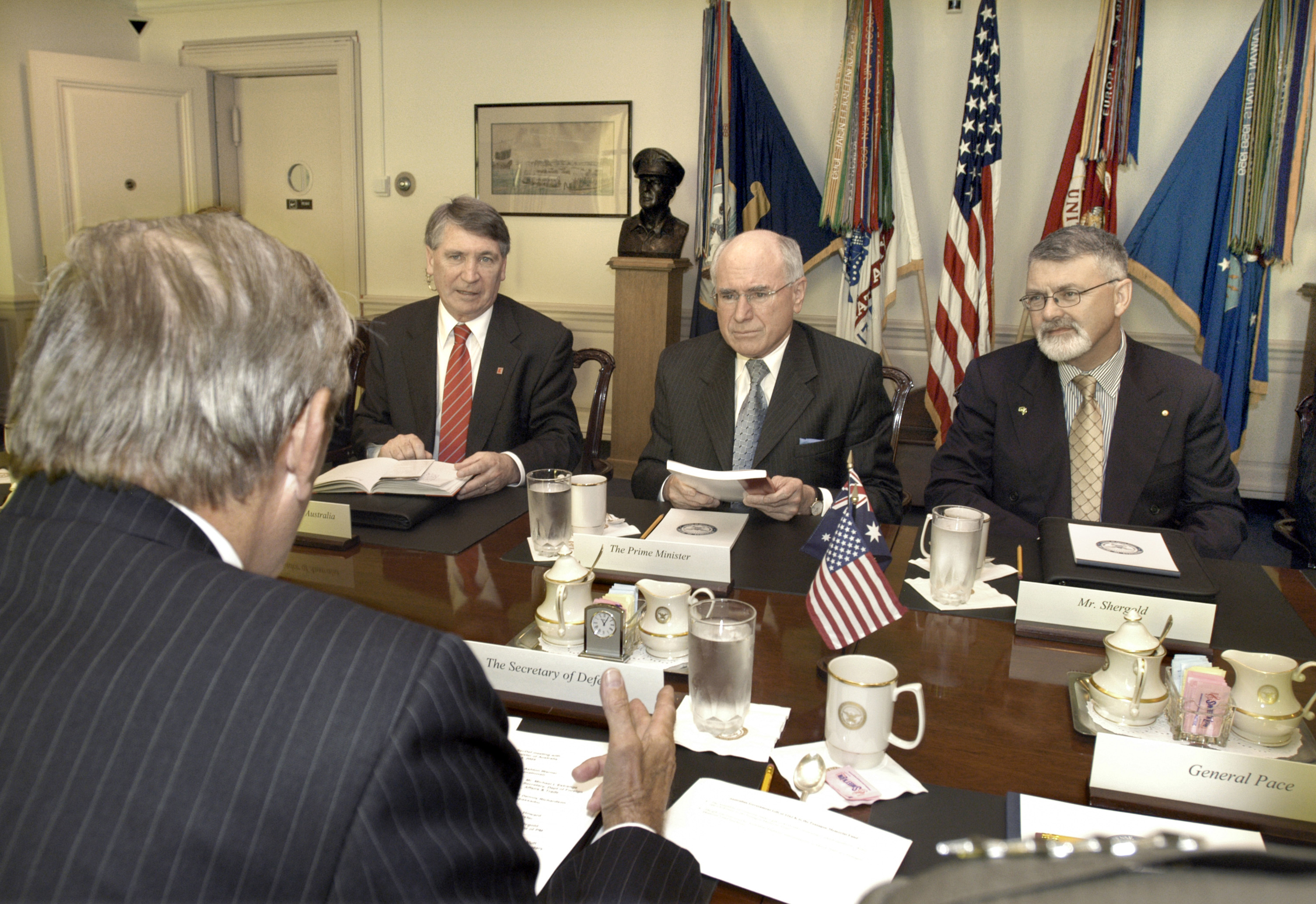
Peter Shergold (right) in his capacity as Secretary of the Department of the Prime Minister and Cabinet; with then Prime Minister John Howard at a 2005 meeting in the United States.

In Australia, a departmental secretary is the most senior public servant of an Australian Government or state government department. They are typically responsible for the day-to-day actions of a department.

== Role ==
A departmental secretary is in theory, a non-political, non-elected public servant head (and "responsible officer") of government departments, who generally holds their position for a number of years. A departmental secretary works closely with the elected government minister that oversees the Commonwealth department or state government department in order to bring about policy and program initiatives that the government of day was elected to achieve. A departmental secretary works with other departments and agencies to ensure the delivery of services and programs within the nominated area of responsibility.

The secretary is also known as the chief executive of the department; the position is equivalent to the permanent secretary of a government department in the United Kingdom and is similar to the director general in some non-Commonwealth countries, or the chief executive officer (CEO) in a private company.

In the Australian government, secretaries are the responsible officers for departments. They are answerable to the Australian Parliament for ensuring that the department performs all the functions assigned to it and spends money appropriately, as granted by the Parliament. Secretaries are frequently called for questioning by the Joint Committee of Public Accounts and Audit, the House of Representatives committees and the Senate committees.

=== Appointment and termination ===
The Public Service Act 1999 requires the secretary of the Department of the Prime Minister and Cabinet to provide a report to the prime minister of the day about the suitability of potential candidates as departmental secretary. The report is prepared in conjunction with the public service commissioner. Appointments and terminations as departmental secretary are made by the governor-general on the advice of the prime minister under Sections 58 and 59 respectively of the Act.

Since removal of tenure under Prime Minister Paul Keating, departmental secretaries are generally aware that while dismissals are not common, following a change of government, failure to re-appoint a secretary is certainly a frequent occurrence. In the first Rudd government, secretaries were appointed for a five-year term; prior to this a term of three years was common. In 1999, the Howard government sought to remove Paul Barratt AO as the secretary of the Department of Defence after Barratt fell out of favour with his minister. Despite being offered a diplomatic post, Barratt refused to vacate the role and commenced legal action, claiming unfair dismissal and that the government had failed to follow due process. Barratt had a temporary stay, but was dismissed within 14 days, and subsequently lost, on appeal in the Federal Court.

The most senior Commonwealth public servant is the secretary of the Department of the Prime Minister and Cabinet, currently Steven Kennedy.

== Current Australian Government secretaries ==
There are currently 16 secretaries within the Australian Government.

Department	Title holder	Effective date	Ref(s)
Australian Government department
Agriculture, Fisheries and Forestry	Justine Saunders APM (acting)	27 September 2025	
Attorney-General's	Katherine Jones PSM	16 August 2021	
Climate Change, Energy, the Environment and Water	Mike Kaiser	14 July 2025	
Defence	Greg Moriarty AO	4 September 2017	
Education	Tony Cook PSM	4 April 2023	
Employment and Workplace Relations	Natalie James	11 July 2022	
Finance	Matt Yannopoulos PSM	29 September 2025	
Foreign Affairs and Trade	Jan Adams AO PSM	1 July 2022	
Health, Disability and Ageing	Blair Comley PSM	17 July 2023	
Home Affairs	Stephanie Foster PSM	28 November 2023	
Industry, Science and Resources	Meghan Quinn PSM	22 August 2022	
Infrastructure, Transport, Regional Development, Communications, Sport and the Arts	Jim Betts	11 July 2022	
Prime Minister and Cabinet	Steven Kennedy PSM	16 June 2025	
Social Services	Michael Lye	11 December 2024	
Treasury	Jenny Wilkinson PSM	16 June 2025	
Veterans' Affairs	Alison Frame	23 January 2023	

== See also ==
- Australian Government
- Australian Public Service
