= Machinery of government =

Interconnected structures and processes of government

The machinery of government (sometimes abbreviated as MoG) is the interconnected structures and processes of government, such as the functions and accountability of departments in the executive branch of government. The term is used primarily for parliamentary democracies. In established systems of public administration, different elements of machinery are sometimes created or reorganized, but the general function of government continues.

The phrase "machinery of government" was thought to have been first used by author John Stuart Mill in Considerations on Representative Government (1861). It was notably used to a public audience by US President Franklin D. Roosevelt in a radio broadcast in 1934, commenting on the role of the National Recovery Administration (NRA) in delivering the New Deal. A number of national governments, including those of Australia, Canada, South Africa, and the United Kingdom, have adopted the term in official usage.

== Australia ==
In Australia, the terms "machinery of government changes" and "administrative re-arrangements" are interchangeable and are used to refer to the changes to the structure of government and the allocation of government functions between departments and ministers.

Machinery of government changes may occur at any time, however the most significant changes generally occur immediately following an election. There is usually very little consultation or discussion prior to machinery of government changes in Australia, especially those following elections.

The Commonwealth Government and some state and territory governments use Administrative Arrangements Orders (also called AAOs) as legal instruments as a primary method to make machinery of government changes.

=== Australian Government Administrative Arrangements Orders ===
At the Commonwealth Government level, Administrative Arrangements Orders (AAOs) are made by the Governor-General on the advice of the Prime Minister formally allocating executive responsibility among ministers. AAOs establish Departments of State under the Constitution, including the principal matters and legislation dealt with by each department and its minister(s). The AAO is generally only updated when functions move between departments, ordering machinery of government changes. Since 1901, there have been over 170 AAOs ordered by the Governor-General. Only one AAO remains active at any one time; when a new AAO is made, all previous AAOs are revoked. Administrative Arrangement Orders are generally published in the Commonwealth Gazette.

Administrative Arrangements Orders are seen by some academics as a central platform of good government management as the orders set the basic structure of cabinet, ministerial responsibilities, portfolios, and departments.

==== Implementation costs ====
When an Administrative Arrangements Order orders departments to be split, cut, or combined, the costs involved in public service machinery of government may include:

- renaming departments, redesigning websites, and changing signs;
- transferring staff, furniture, equipment, leases, and files between departments;
- transferring or merging IT services; and
- cutting staff, particularly in senior ranks. Total costs associated with issuing new Administrative Arrangements Orders are unknown, as the costs involved with machinery of government changes are not collated or reported, but in November 2013, the Secretary of the Department of Immigration and Border Protection told a Senate estimates hearing that the cost of the department's name change was cheap at "only" an estimated $195,000.

=== State and territory government machinery of government mechanisms ===
==== Australian Capital Territory ====
According to KPMG, in the Australian Capital Territory (ACT), the Chief Minister of the ACT is given full power to allocate executive power to ministers and to establish government "administrative units".

==== New South Wales ====
According to KPMG, in New South Wales (NSW) government structure is established under section 104 of the Public Sector Employment and Management Act 2002. The Act gives the Governor of New South Wales the power to create, rename or abolish any NSW Government department through the issue of an executive order, acting on the advice of the elected government.

==== Northern Territory ====
In the Northern Territory (NT), according to KPMG, the Administrator of the Northern Territory determines government structural arrangements, acting on the advice of the government of the day.

==== Queensland ====
In Queensland (Qld), the Premier has sole responsibility for determining ministerial portfolios. On the Premier's advice, the Governor of Queensland sets out the responsibilities of ministers and their portfolios in AAOs. AAOs are re-issued or amended when government structural changes take place.

The biggest machinery of government changes in Queensland's history were in December 1989, under the Labor Government headed by Wayne Goss. Machinery of government changes made in March 2009 were also significant, collapsing 23 stand-alone government departments into 13.

==== South Australia ====
According to KPMG, in South Australia the Governor may establish, alter and abolish government departments under powers provided in section 26 of the Public Service Act 2009.

==== Tasmania ====
In Tasmania, administrative arrangements are set out in Administrative Arrangements Orders The orders cover which Minister is responsible for the administration of legislation.

==== Victoria ====
In Victoria (Vic), government structure is set by an Order in Council made under section 10 of the Public Administration Act 2004. The Act gives the Governor of Victoria the power to create departments and allocate functions. Staff and work units can also be transferred between departments by declaration of the relevant Minister.

==== Western Australia ====
According to KPMG, under section 35(1) of the Western Australian Public Sector Management Act 1994, the Governor of Western Australia may establish, amalgamate or abolish government departments on the recommendation of the Public Service Commissioner. Section 35(4) of the same Act provides that the Minister responsible for public service matters may direct the Public Service Commissioner to make recommendations the Governor and the Commissioner must comply with that recommendation.

== See also ==
- Bureaucracy
