= Sydney Airport =

International airport serving Sydney, New South Wales, Australia

Sydney Airport Kingsford Smith

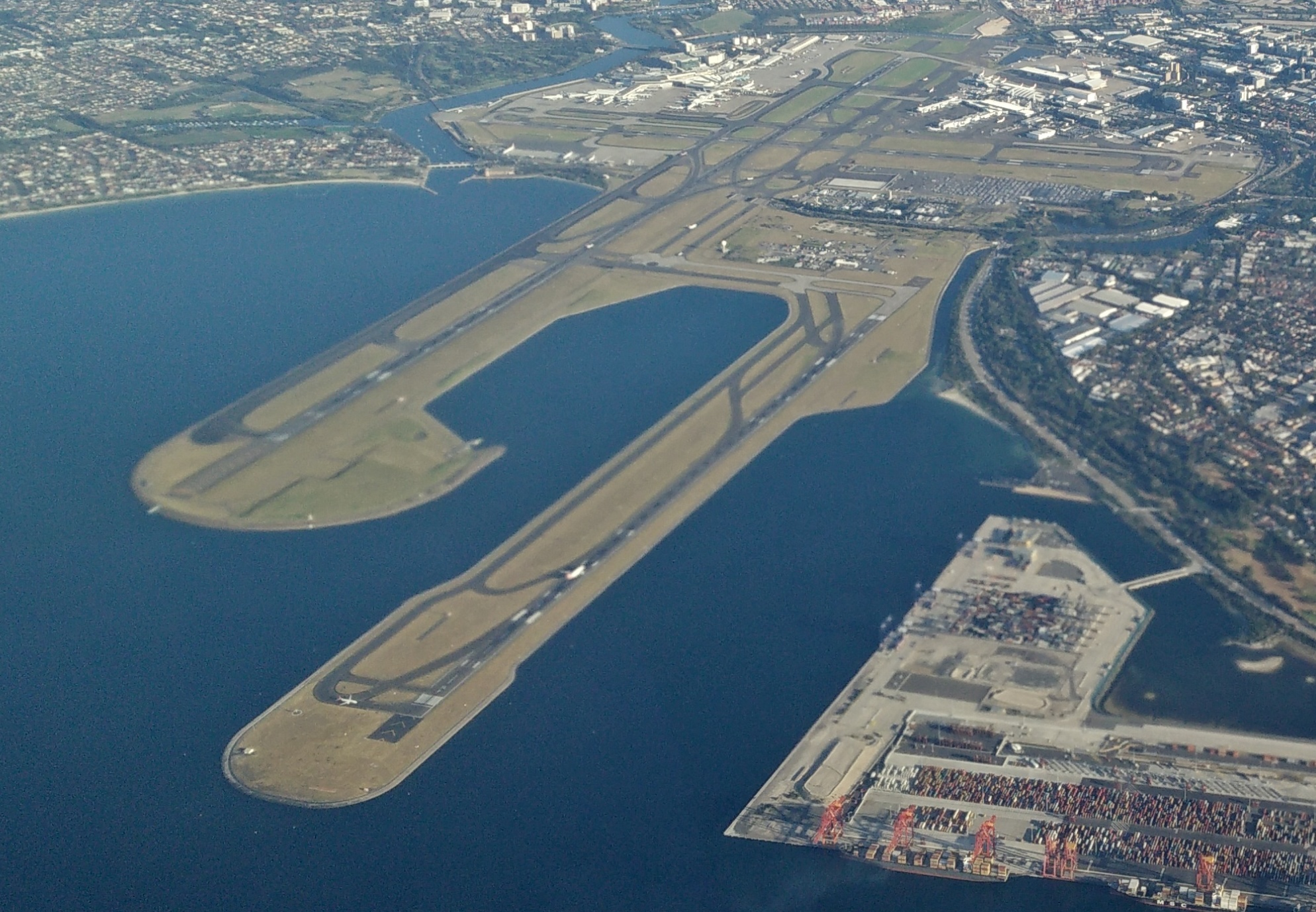
- Sydney Airport, situated within Botany Bay
- IATA: SYD; ICAO: YSSY; WMO: 94767

Summary
- Airport type: Public
- Owner/Operator: Sydney Airport Corporation
- Serves: Greater Sydney
- Location: Mascot, New South Wales, Australia
- Opened: 9 January 1920; 106 years ago
- Hub for: ASL Airlines Australia; Qantas; Virgin Australia
- Operating base for: Jetstar; Rex Airlines
- Elevation AMSL: 21 ft (6.4 m)
- Coordinates: 33°56′46″S 151°10′38″E
- Website: www.sydneyairport.com.au

Map
- Interactive map of Sydney Airport

Runways
Direction	Length		Surface
Direction	m	ft	Surface
07/25	2,530	8,301	Asphalt
16L/34R	2,438	7,999	Asphalt
16R/34L	3,963	13,002	Asphalt

Statistics (2025)
- Passengers: 42,540,000 ▲2.8%
- Aircraft movements: 321,816
- International cargo (Metric tonnes)(2024): 552,679
- Economic impact (2012): $13.2 billion
- Source: Aeronautical Information Publication (AIP); Passenger and aircraft movements from the Department of Infrastructure, Transport, Regional Development, Communications, Sport and the Arts

Sydney Airport (IATA: SYD, ICAO: YSSY), officially Sydney Kingsford Smith Airport and occasionally known as Mascot Airport, is an international airport located in Mascot, New South Wales, Australia, 9 kilometres (5.6 miles) south of the Sydney central business district. It is the primary airport serving Sydney and its metropolitan area, and is the main hub for Qantas, the flag carrier of Australia, as well as a hub for Virgin Australia and an operating base for Jetstar.

Situated next to Botany Bay on 907 hectares (2,241 acres) of land with three runways, Sydney Airport is one of the world's longest continuously operated commercial airports and is the busiest airport in Australia, handling 41.4 million passengers and 348,904 aircraft movements in 2024 and 2017, respectively. Currently, 46 domestic and 43 international destinations are served to Sydney directly, having been the 48th busiest airport in the world in 2022. In 2018, the airport was rated in the top five worldwide for airports handling 40–50 million passengers annually and was overall voted the 20th best airport in the world at the Skytrax World Airport Awards.

The airport is owned by Sydney Airport Corporation Limited.

== History ==
=== 1911–1930: Early history ===
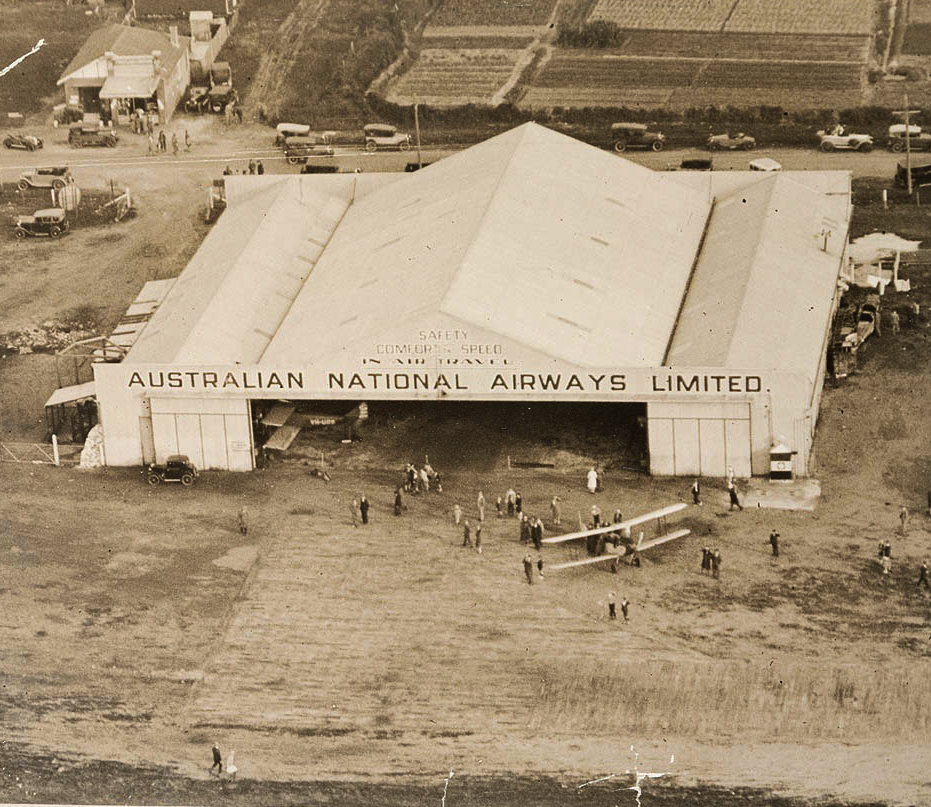
The newly-completed Australian National Airways Limited hangar at Mascot aerodrome, c. 1929–1931

The land used for the airport had been a bullock paddock, with a lot of the area around Mascot being swampy. Flights had been taking off from at least 1911 from these fields, with aviators using other Sydney locations like Anderson Park and Neutral Bay for a few years prior.

Nigel Love established the airfield at Mascot as a private concern, leasing 80 hectares (200 acres) from the Kensington Race Club for three years. It initially had a small canvas structure but was later equipped with an imported Richards hangar. The first flight from Mascot was in November 1919 when Love carried freelance movie photographer Billy Marshall up in an Avro. Sydney Airport was declared an aerodrome and officially opened in January 1920. The official opening flight took place on 9 January 1920, also performed by Love.

In 1921, the Commonwealth Government purchased 65 hectares (161 acres) in Mascot for the purpose of creating a public airfield. In 1923, when Love's three-year lease expired, the Mascot land was compulsorily acquired by the Commonwealth Government from the racing club. The first regular flights began in 1924.

=== 1930–1950 ===
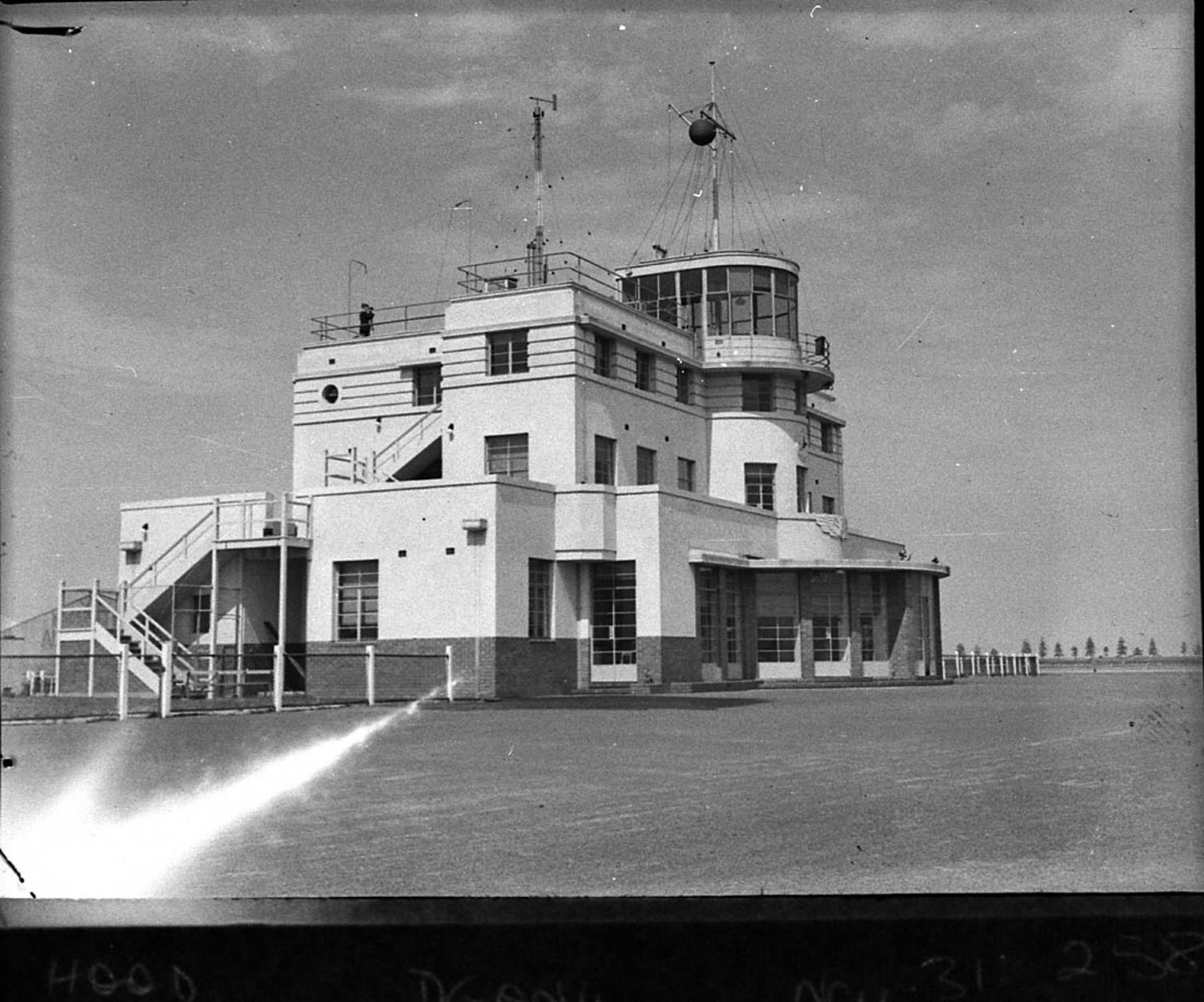
The 1940 terminal building and control tower

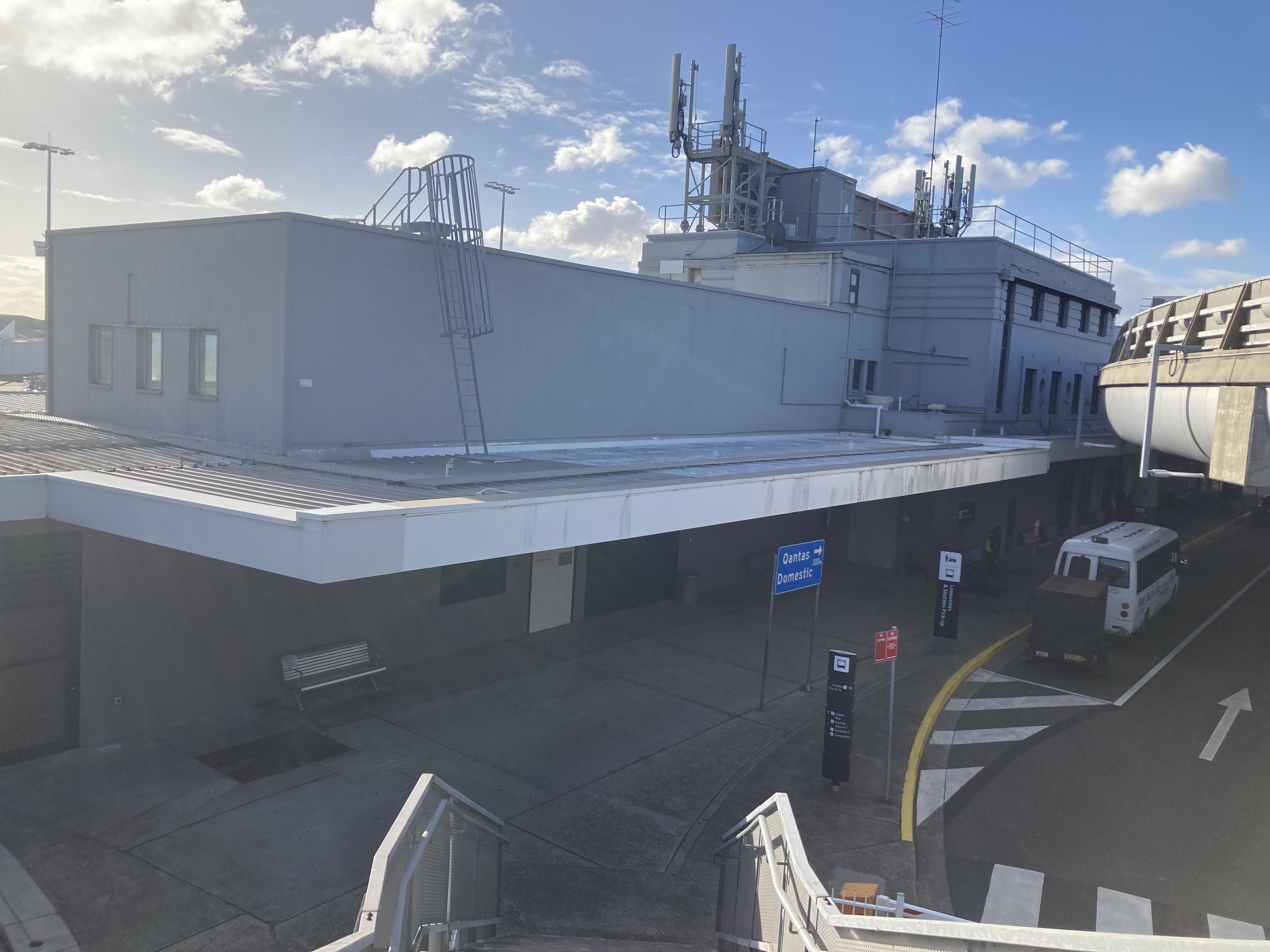
The same terminal building in September 2024, with the control tower since removed

In 1933, the first gravel runways were built. On 14 August 1936, the airport was renamed Sydney (Kingsford Smith) Airport in honour of pioneering Australian aviator Sir Charles Kingsford Smith. In 1940, the Department of Civil Aviation constructed an administrative and terminal building in the eastern part of the aerodrome, with a control tower cab at the top floor. The building is now part of Terminal 3 since 1999, but the control tower cab has already been removed.

By 1949, the airport had three runways – the 1,085-metre (3,560 ft) 11/29, the 1,190-metre (3,904 ft) 16/34, and the 1,787-metre (5,863 ft) 04/22. The Sydenham to Botany railway line crossed runway 04/22 approximately 150 metres (490 ft) from the northern end and was protected by special safe working facilities.

In the late 1940s (c. 1947–1949), a temporary overseas passenger (i.e. international) terminal was constructed. The original 1940 terminal then became the terminal building for the Trans Australia Airlines (TAA), the government-owned domestic airline, and the building also became known as the TAA terminal building. The temporary overseas passenger terminal was later replaced by a newer one in 1954, located just north of the 1940 terminal building.

=== 1950–1990: Modernisation and upgrades ===
During the year 1950, the airport handled at least 793,956 passengers and was ranked among the busiest airports in the world.

Between 1947 and 1953, the Cooks River was diverted away around the western side of the airport and other small streams were filled. This allowed the construction of two new paved runways to replace the three gravel runways. The first paved runway to be constructed was 07/25, completed in 1953–1954. Subsequently, the next paved runway to be constructed was 16/34 (now 16R/34L) which replaced the parallel gravel runway 16/34. Both runways were constructed south of the gravel runways. At the same time, on 2 November 1953, a new air traffic control tower with an integrated fire station was constructed northeast of where the two runways intersect, replacing the control tower on the 1940 terminal building. The tower was demolished in 2005.

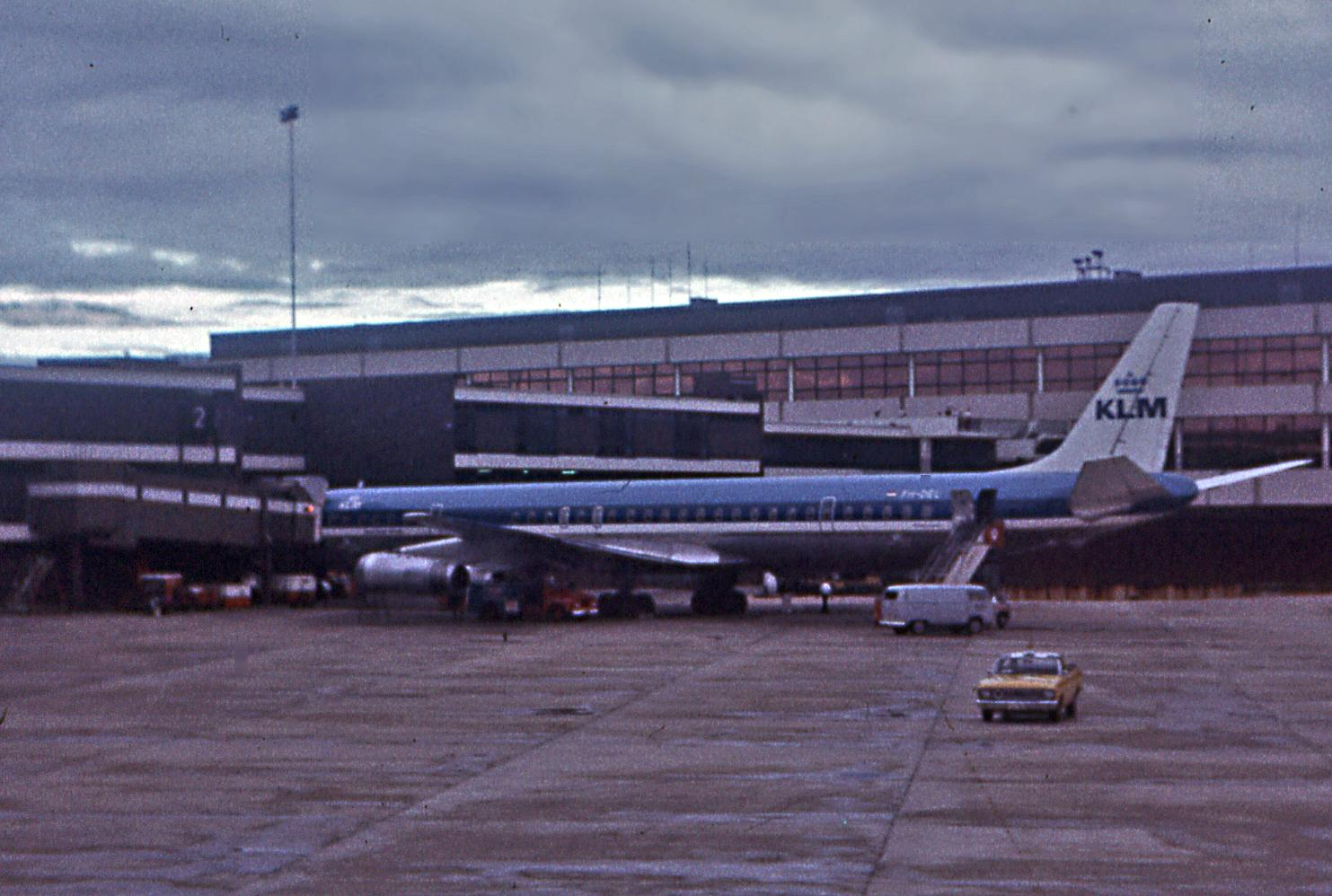
KLM Douglas DC-8 at Gate 2 of the International Terminal in 1972

The new runway 16R/34L was later extended southwards into Botany Bay over General Holmes Drive in 1968 to accommodate long-haul international jets, and then extended again to its current length in 1972. Sydney Airport's main runway is one of the longest commercial runways in the world at just under 4km. It was extended to this length in the late 1970s so it could double as a designated emergency landing site for the NASA Space Shuttle until 1986. Since then, the east–west 07/25 runway was 2,500 m (8,300 ft) long; and the north–south 16/34 runway was one of the longest runways in the Southern Hemisphere.

Up to the early 1960s, the majority of Sydneysiders referred to the airport as Mascot. Jet aircraft started to arrive in July 1959, with the introduction of Qantas' Boeing 707-138. By the 1960s, the need for a new international terminal had become apparent. In the late 1940s and early 1950s, a terminal block for both international and domestic flights was proposed to be at the southeast portion of the airport near General Holmes Drive, but the proposal never eventuated. Work commenced on the construction of the new terminal in late 1966. Much of the new terminal was designed by Paynter and Dixon Industries with Costain appointed lead contractor. The new terminal was officially opened on 3 May 1970, by Queen Elizabeth II. The first Boeing 747 "Jumbo Jet" at the airport, Pan Am's Clipper Flying Cloud (N734PA), arrived on 4 October 1970.

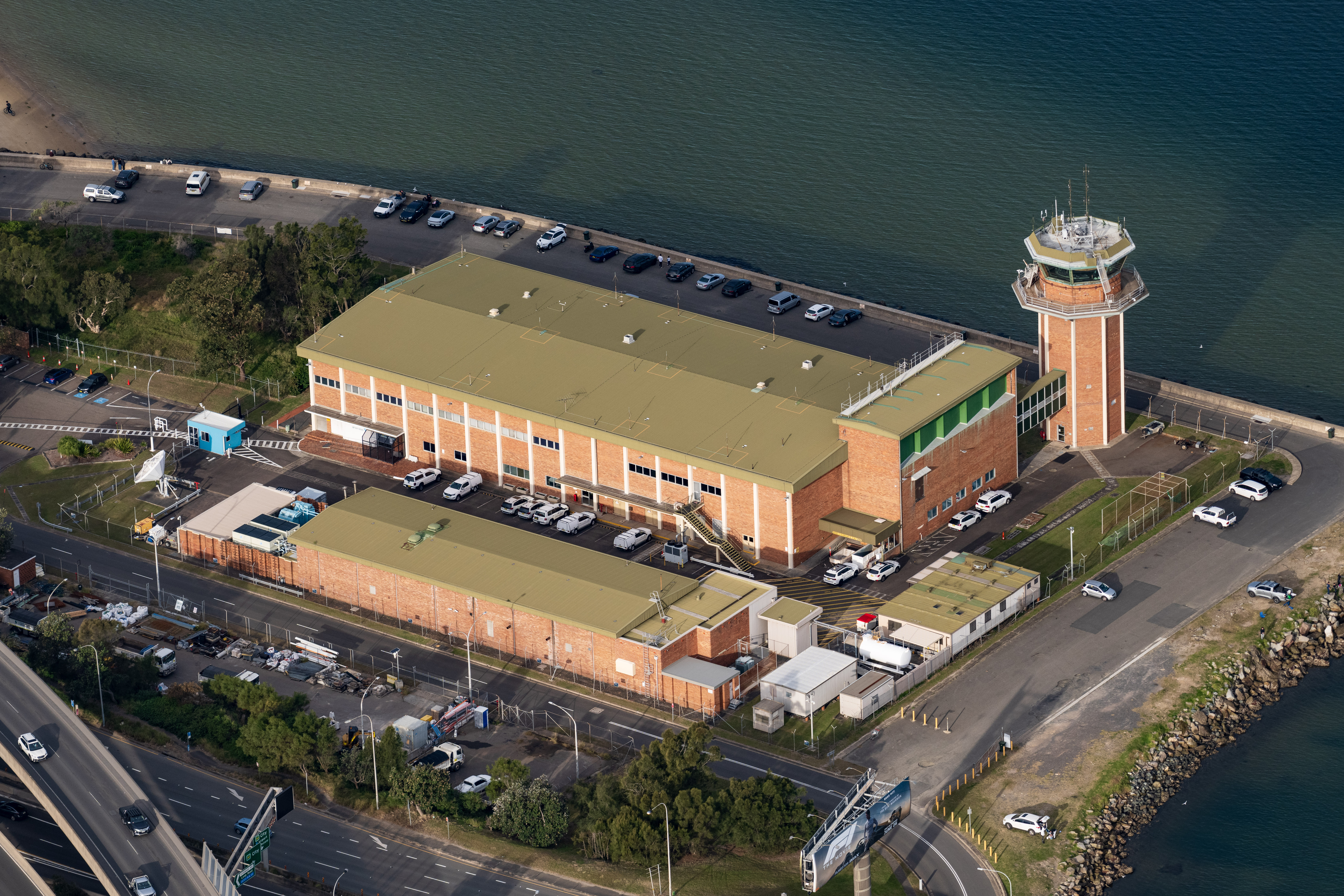
Sydney Airport's ATC tower no. 4, known commonly today as the "old ATC tower", was in operation between 1972 and 1996

Meanwhile, the 1940 TAA domestic terminal was expanded and modernised in 1962, with departures separated from arrivals along with other upgrades. The terminal was replaced by a new TAA terminal in 1974, constructed on the site of the old international terminal building after the new international terminal opened four years prior. The new terminal was located directly north and adjacent to the original TAA terminal. The 1940 terminal was then taken over by East-West Airlines.

Upgrades and expansion of the Ansett terminal (now Terminal 2) also began in 1974.

=== 1990–2010 ===
Since the international terminal's original completion, it has undergone a few expansions. The international terminal was first expanded in 1992 with the construction of Pier C in the south.

The "third runway", which the Commonwealth government commenced development of in 1989 and completed in 1994, remained controversial because of increased aircraft movements, especially over inner suburbs. In 1995 the No Aircraft Noise party was formed to contest the 1995 New South Wales state election. The party did not win a seat in parliament but came close in the electorate of Marrickville. It also contested the 1996 Australian federal election.

In 1995, the Australian Parliament passed the Sydney Airport Curfew Act 1995, which limits the operating hours of the airport. This was done in an effort to reduce airport noise over residential areas and thereby curb complaints. The curfew prevents aircraft from taking off or landing between the hours of 11 pm and 6 am. A limited number of scheduled and approved take-offs and landings are permitted respectively in the "shoulder periods" of 11 pm to midnight and 5 am to 6 am. The Act does not stop all aircraft movements overnight but limits noise by restricting the types of aircraft that can operate, the runways they can use and the number of flights allowed. During extreme weather, flights are often delayed and it is often the case that people on late flights are unable to travel on a given day. As of 2009, fines for violating curfew have been levied against four airlines, with a maximum fine of A$550,000 applicable. In addition to the curfew, Sydney Airport also has a cap of 80 aircraft movements per hour which cannot be exceeded, leading to increased delays during peak hours.

In 1998, the Federal Government agreed to separate Sydney Airport from the Federal Airports Corporation and to incorporate it as Sydney Airport Corporation. David Mortimer was appointed as Chair and Tony Stuart as CEO. Its mandate was to successfully redevelop the airport as the gateway for the Sydney 2000 Olympics, support the growth of new airlines such as Virgin and Emirates, and prepare it for a successful $3 billion-plus privatisation. In 2001 Sydney Airport was awarded World's Best Airport. In preparation for privatisation the airport argued successfully for a new regulatory regime.

All three terminals were upgraded prior to the 2000 Summer Olympics which was to be held in Sydney.

In 2002, the Commonwealth Government sold Sydney Airport Corporation (SAC), to Southern Cross Airports Corporation Holdings for $5.4 billion. 83 percent of SAC is owned by MAp Airports International Limited, a subsidiary of Macquarie Group, Sydney Airport Intervest GmbH owns 12 percent and Ontario Teachers' Australia Trust owns 5 percent. SACL holds a 99-year lease on the airport which remains Crown land and as such is categorised as a Leased Federal Airport.

In 2005, a planned expansion of the airport was announced, including the construction of a multi-level car park, and the expansion of both international and domestic terminals. The expansion was planned to stretch over 20 years (2005–25). These expansions—and other plans and policies by Macquarie Bank for airport operations were seen as controversial, as they were performed without the legal oversight of local councils, which usually act as the local planning authority for such developments. As of April 2006, some of the proposed development had been scaled back.

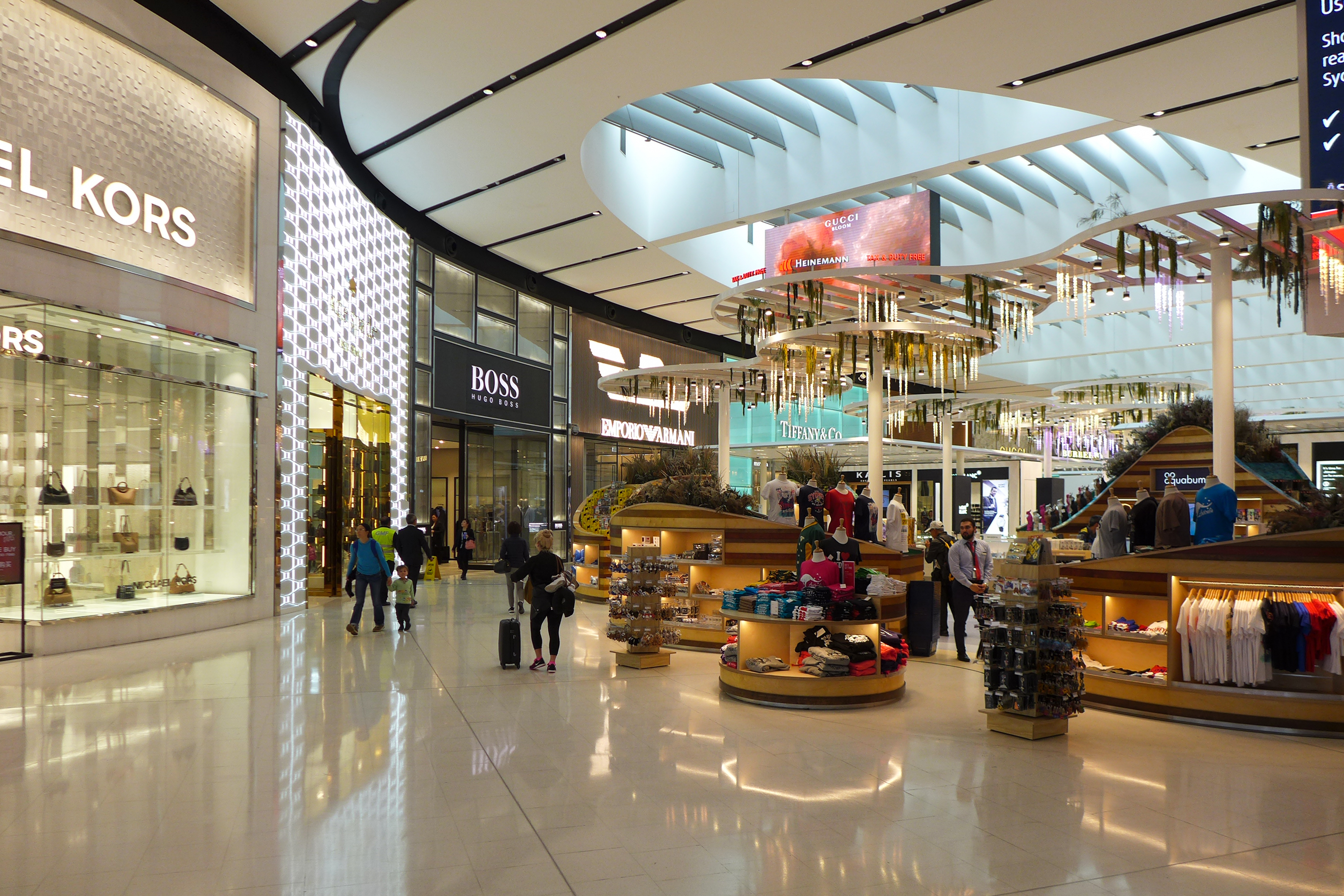
Modernised retail area of Terminal 1

The international terminal underwent a A$500,000,000 renovation that was completed in mid-2010. The upgrade includes a new baggage system, an extra 7,300 m^{2} (78,577 sq ft) of space for shops and passenger waiting areas, expansion of the transit zone, and other improvements.

In March 2010, the Australian Competition & Consumer Commission released a report sharply critical of price gouging at Sydney airport, ranking it fifth out of five airports. The report noted Sydney Airport recorded the highest average prices at $13.63 per passenger, compared to the lowest at $7.96 at Melbourne Airport, while the price of short-term parking had almost doubled in the 2008–09 financial year, from $28 to $50 for four hours. This amounts to the highest profit margins on aeronautical services and very high profit margins on car parking fees. The report also accused the airport of abusing its monopoly power.

=== 2011–present: Modern history ===
In December 2011, Sydney Airport announced a proposal to divide the airport into two airline-alliance-based precincts; integrating international, domestic, and regional services under one roof by 2019. Under the proposal, Terminal 2 and Terminal 3 would be used by Qantas, Jetstar, and members of the Oneworld airline alliance while Terminal 1 would be used by Virgin Australia and its international partners. Other international airlines would continue to operate from T1. In September 2012, Sydney Airport Managing Director and CEO Kerrie Mather announced the airport had abandoned the proposal to create alliance-based terminals in favour of terminals "based around specific airline requirements and (passenger) transfer flows". She stated the plan was to minimise the number of passengers transferring between terminals.

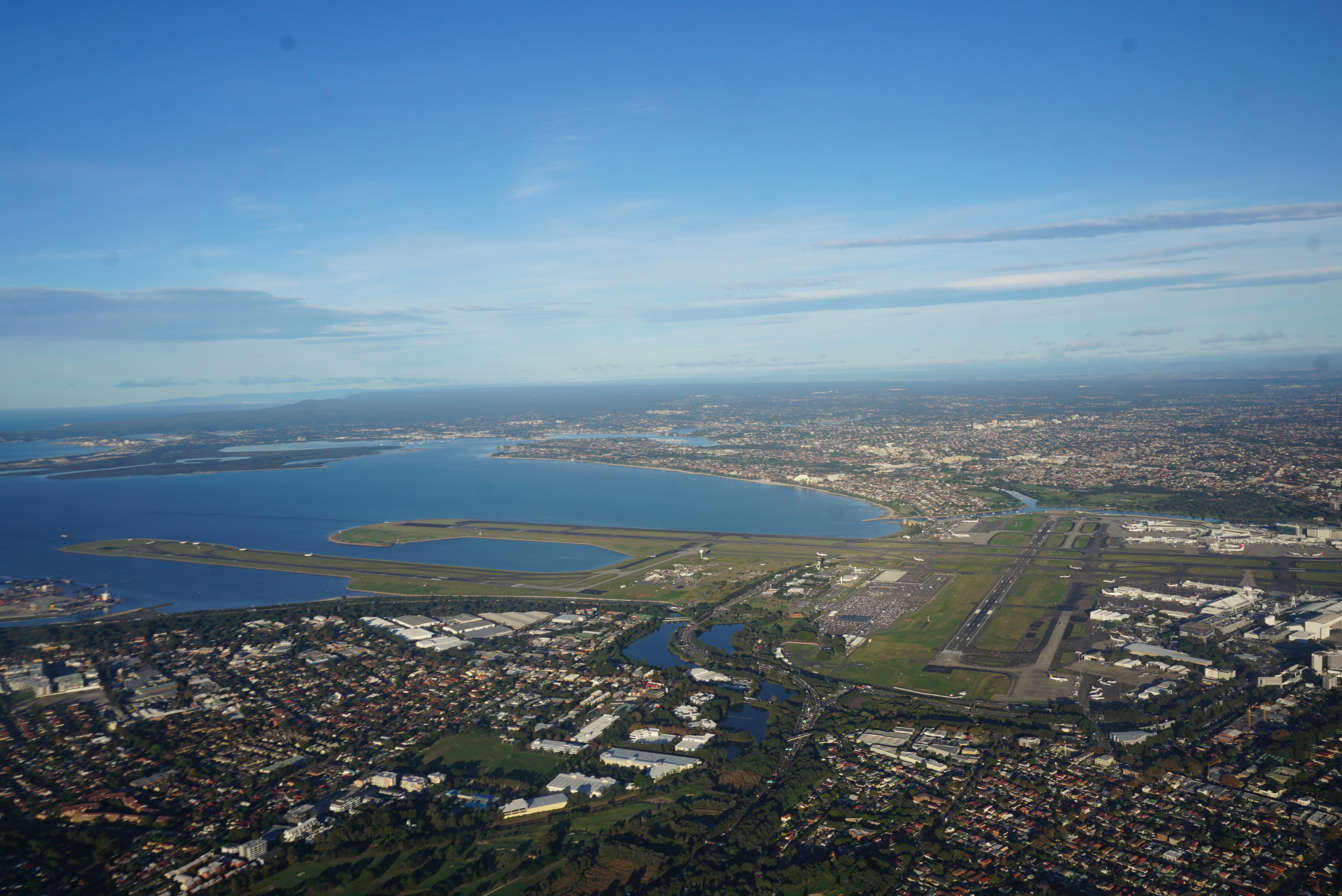
Aerial view of the airport and its surrounds, 2016

In June 2013, the airport released a draft version of its 2033 Master Plan, which proposed operating domestic and international flights from the same terminals using 'swing gates', along with upgrading Terminal 3 (then the Qantas domestic terminal) to accommodate the Airbus A380. On 17 February 2014, the Australian Government approved the Master Plan, which outlined the airport's plans to cater to the forecast demand of 74 million passengers in 2033. The plan included Sydney Airport's first-ever integrated ground transport plan.

On 27 August 2018, the Sydney Airport Master Plan 2039 was announced. The plan forecast an increase in annual passenger numbers from 43.3 million in 2017 to 65.6 million in 2039. It proposed retaining Terminal 1 for international services and developing Terminals 2 and 3 to accommodate domestic, regional and international flights, alongside improvements to road access and passenger pick-up and drop-off facilities.

The COVID-19 pandemic sharply reduced traffic at the airport. In 2020, passenger numbers fell by 74.7 per cent compared with 2019, to 11.2 million. Passenger numbers declined further to 7.9 million in 2021, when travel continued to be affected by border closures and stay-at-home orders.

In March 2022, Sydney Aviation Alliance, a consortium of superannuation and infrastructure investors, completed its A$23.6 billion acquisition of Sydney Airport Holdings. The airport's listed securities were subsequently removed from the Australian Securities Exchange.

The Sydney Gateway road connection opened to traffic on 1 September 2024, linking the airport with the motorway network at St Peters. In 2025, work began on an A$200 million redevelopment of Terminal 2, including changes to check-in, baggage drop-off and security screening. By the second quarter of 2026, all seven new security screening lanes were operational, while the wider terminal upgrade continued.

Reforms to the airport's demand management scheme took effect on 26 October 2025. They introduced new offences and increased penalties for misuse of take-off and landing slots, expanded the slot manager's monitoring powers and strengthened independent oversight. During 2025, the airport handled 42.54 million passengers, including a record 17.17 million international passengers.

In August 2026, the Australian Government approved the airport's Master Plan 2045. The plan included expansion of Terminal 1, redevelopment of Terminals 2 and 3, and additional freight facilities. It was based on the airport operator's forecast of 72.6 million annual passenger movements by 2045. The plan includes merging the existing Terminals 2 and 3 to create one large terminal, which would make passenger movements such as domestic transfers easier. This helps the airport achieve its forecasted 75% increase by 2045, with the central precinct featuring new 'swing gates', which can switch between domestic and international operations easily. It would soothe the demand that the current Terminal 1 experiences due to competing airlines fighting for slots which are limited. However, the airport also plans to expand Terminal 1, by extending existing terminal piers. The plan also proposes expanding the current freight terminal, which would include upgrading equipment in order to accommodate for an increase in air freight, which is projected to rise from 600,000 tonnes to 1.4 million in 2045.

In July and August 2026, the Australian Transport Safety Bureau (ATSB) opened six investigations into runway and taxiing incidents at the airport. The ATSB reported that, on 27 July, a Qantas Boeing 737 was cleared to cross a runway while a QantasLink Dash 8 was completing its landing roll; air traffic control alerted both crews and the Boeing stopped beyond the holding point. On 9 August, a taxiing Jetstar Airbus A320 and a Qatar Airways Boeing 777 under tow stopped abruptly to avoid a collision, injuring a Jetstar cabin crew member. Later that morning, a Virgin Australia Boeing 737 stopped its take-off after its crew saw a Qantas Boeing 737 crossing the runway ahead.

The other investigations concerned taxiing conflicts on 17 and 18 August and a pushback conflict on 25 August. The ATSB said that these three occurrences had presented no immediate risk of collision. It said its investigations would examine whether the incidents shared underlying safety issues or contributing factors.

== Operations ==
=== Runways ===
Airport map

Runway 07/25 is used mainly by lighter aircraft but is used by all aircraft including Airbus A380s when conditions require. Runway 16R/34L is presently the longest operational runway in Australia, with a paved length of 4,400 m (14,300 ft) and 3,920 m (12,850 ft) between the zebra thresholds. Runway 16L/34R is mainly used by domestic aircraft and large aircraft up to the size of B767/A330/B787/B772/A359, but is used by larger aircraft such as B77L/B773/B77W/B744/A340/A35K/MD11 when no other runway is available.

=== Control towers ===
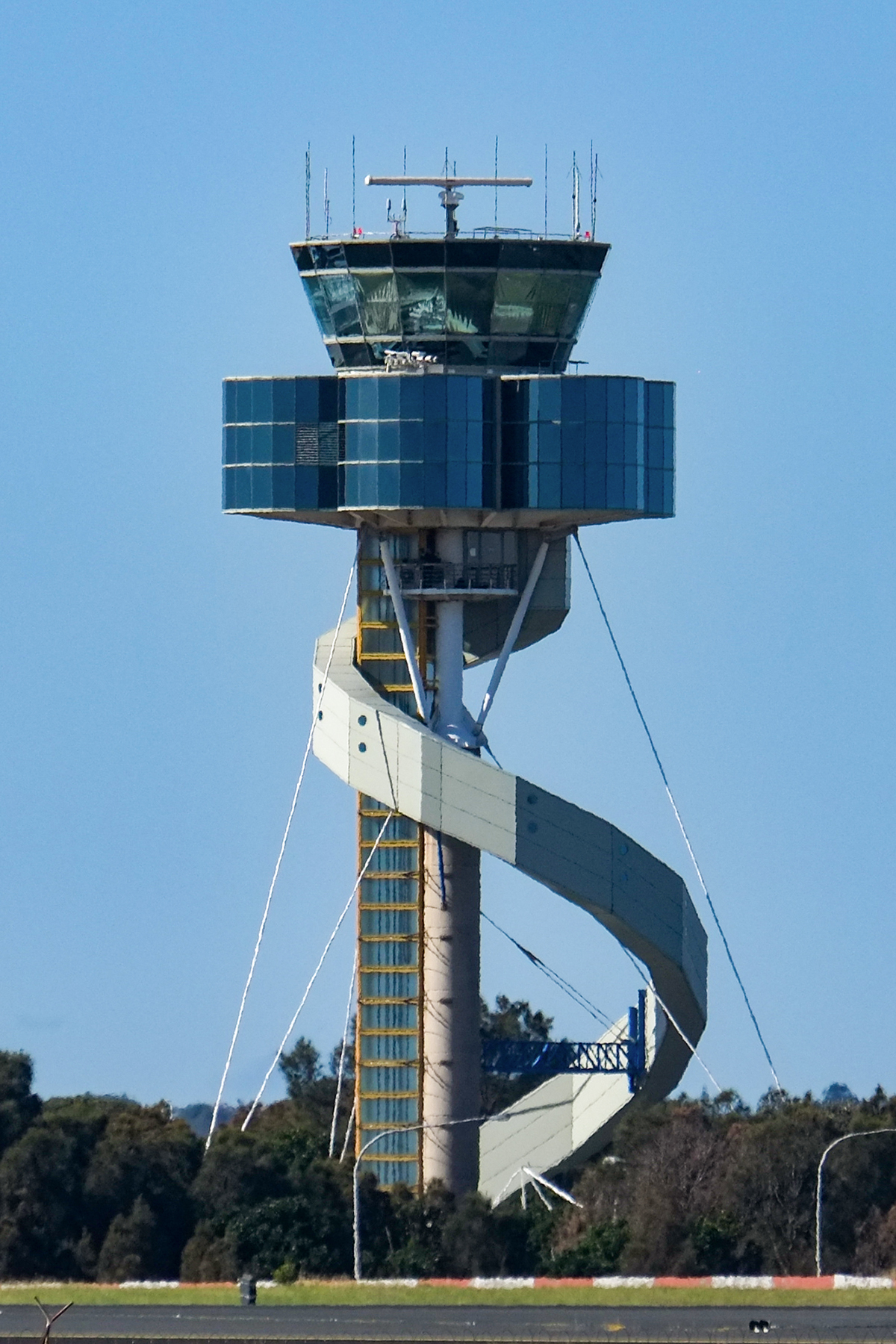
Air Traffic Control Tower No.5, in operation since 1996

The present Sydney Airport control tower (No. 5) is the fifth air traffic control tower at the airport. It is also heritage-listed since 2016. The tower occupies a central position in the airport, located northeast to where General Holmes Drive goes under the main Runway 16R/34L. It began construction in 1993 in conjunction with the construction of parallel Runway 16L/34R, and was commissioned on 6 January 1996.

The control tower replaces the fourth control tower (No. 4) built in 1972, located at the mouth of Cooks River and south of General Holmes Drive. As of 2021, the control tower complex remains standing and is used by Airservices Australia as its Traffic Control Unit to manage planes within a 100 kilometres (62 mi) radius from Sydney. However, the Traffic Control Unit was slated to be moved to Melbourne and the control tower complex was slated for demolition.

== Terminals ==
Sydney Airport has three passenger terminals. The International Terminal (Terminal 1) is separated from the other two domestic terminals (Terminals 2 & 3) by runway 16R/34L; therefore, connecting passengers need to allow for longer transfer times ranging from 30 minutes to an hour or more.

The existing terminal numbering system (Terminals 1 to 3) was adopted on 24 September 2002.

=== Terminal 1 ===
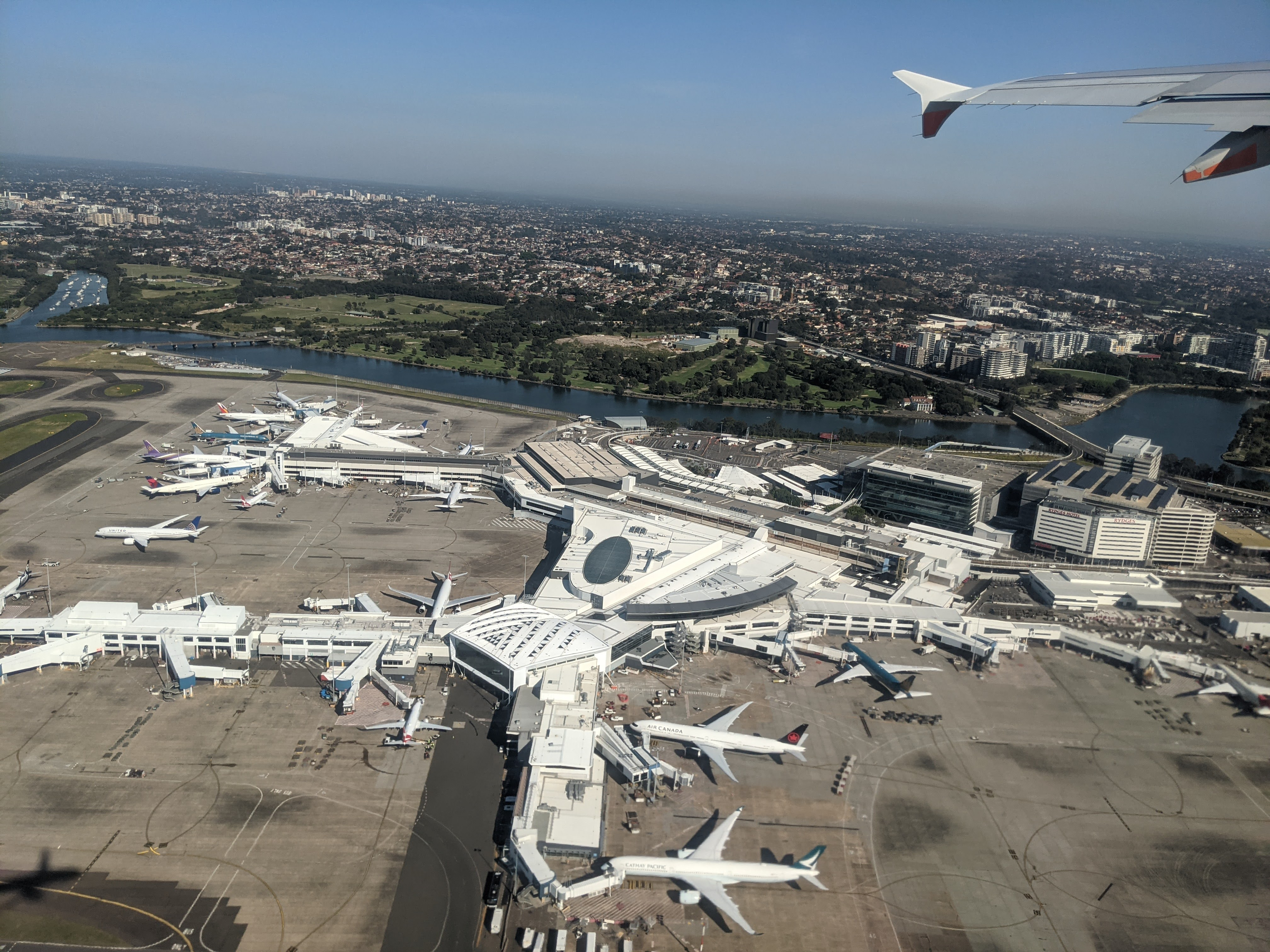
Aerial view of Terminal 1

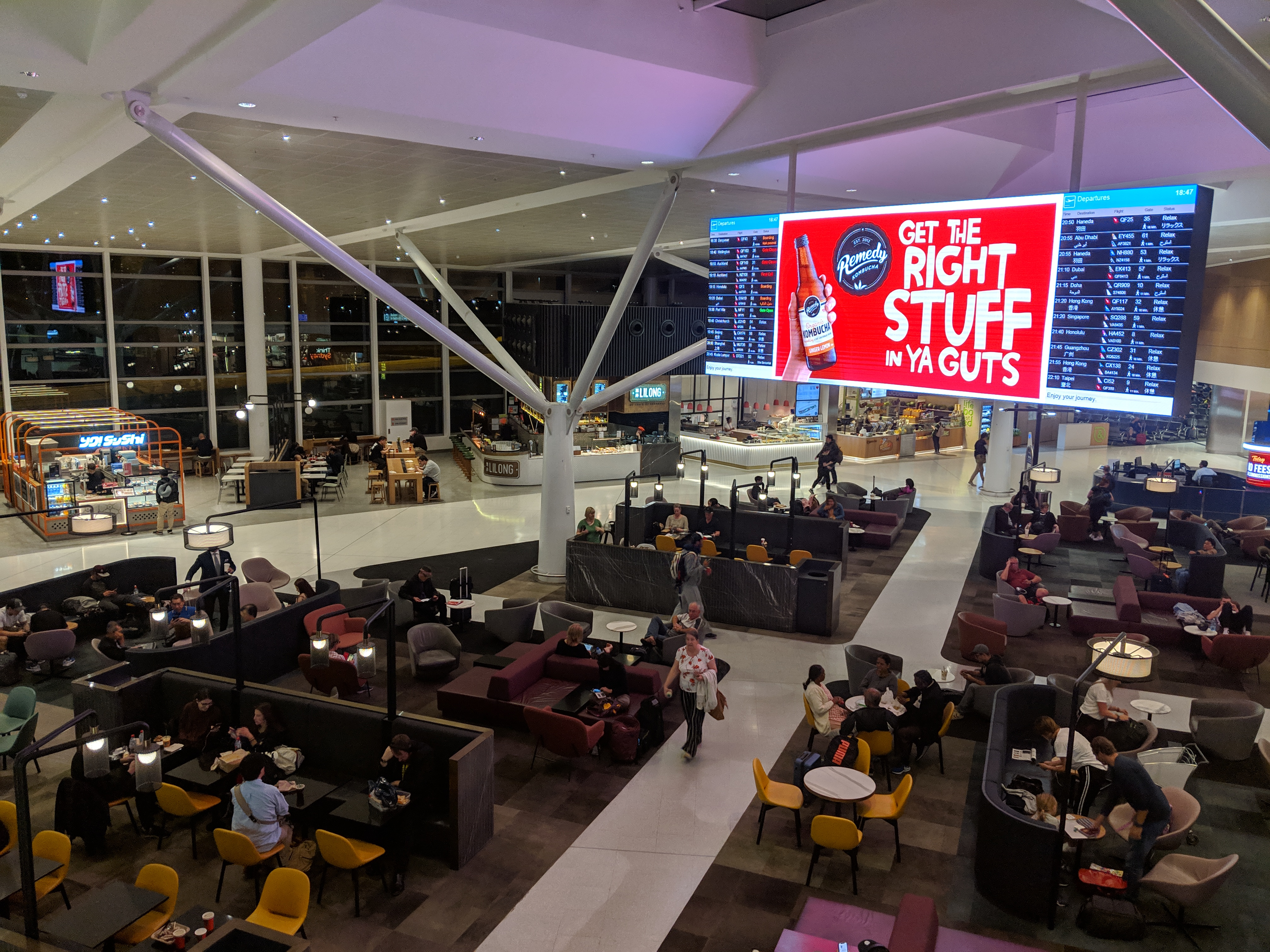
Terminal 1 airside

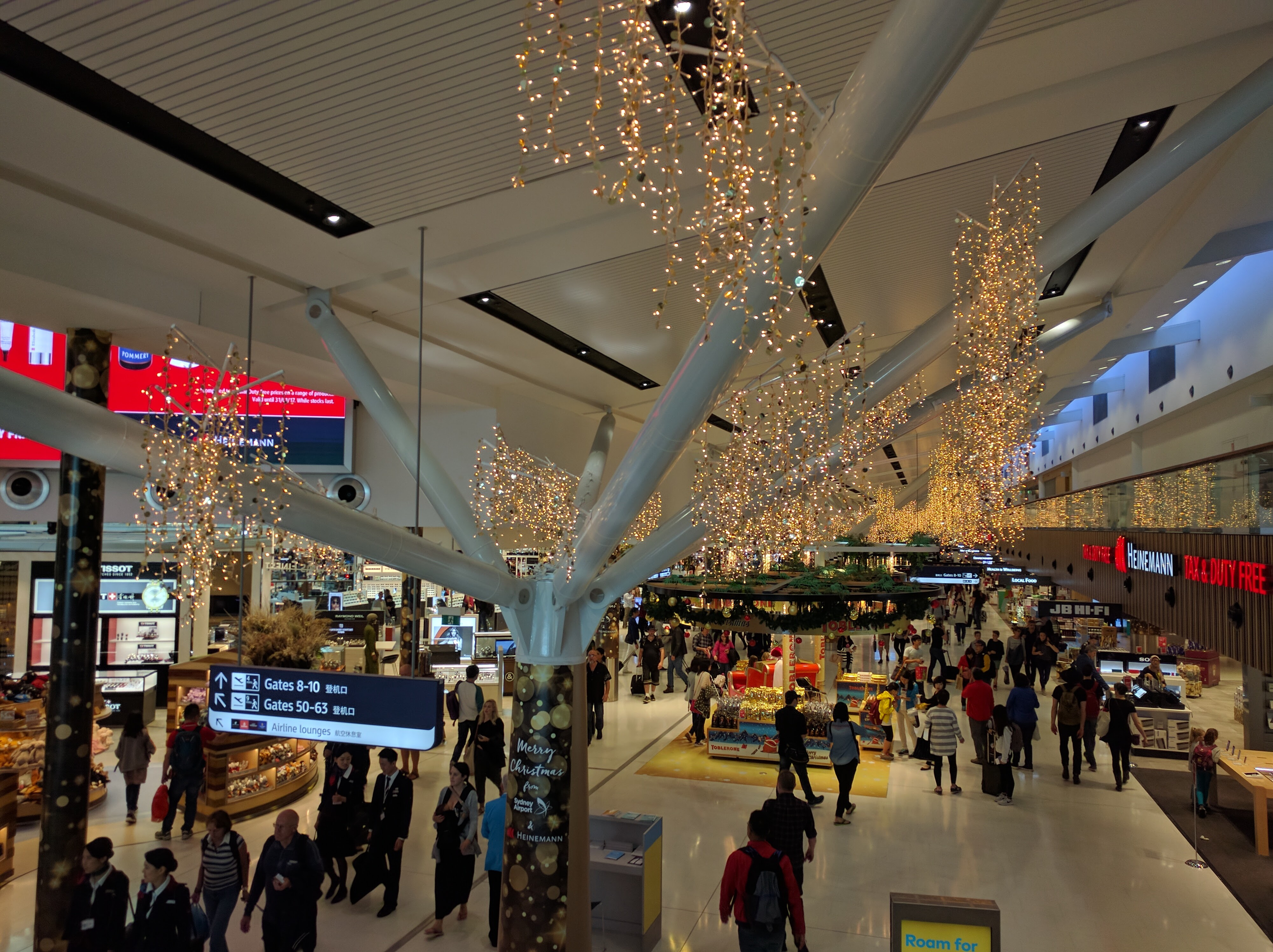
Duty-free concourse, Terminal 1

Terminal 1 is also known as the International Terminal and serves all international flights. It is located in the airport's northwestern sector. It was opened on 3 May 1970, replacing the old Overseas Passenger Terminal (which was located where Terminal 3 stands now), and has been greatly expanded since then. The first extension in 1992 opened Pier C to the south with nine new gates, increasing the number of gates from 17 to 26. The original piers that opened in 1970 also became known as Pier B. The second extension was undertaken between 1997 and 2000 before the 2000 Summer Olympics, including ten new aircraft parking positions and new integrated baggage handling system. A third $500 million redevelopment was completed in 2010, by which the shopping complex was expanded, outbound customs operations were centralised and the floor space of the terminal increased to 254,000 square metres (2,730,000 sq ft). Further renovations began in 2015 with a reconfiguration and decluttering of outbound and inbound duty-free areas, an extension of the airside dining areas, and the installation of Australian Border Force outbound immigration SmartGates. These works were completed in 2016.

The terminal has 25 gates served by aerobridges, thirteen of which are in Pier B (numbered 8–10, 24–25 and 30–37), and twelve in Pier C (numbered 50–51, 53–61 and 63). Prior to the 2010 upgrade, there also used to be gates 20, 22 and 23 in Pier B. Pier B is used by Qantas, all Oneworld members, and all SkyTeam members. Pier C is used by Virgin Australia and its partners as well as all Star Alliance members. There are also a number of remote bays which are heavily utilised during peak periods and for parking idle aircraft during the day. As of 2024, there is currently no Pier A, but Pier A would be the name for a northern expansion if it were to happen in the future.

The terminal building is split into three levels, one each for arrivals, departures, and airline offices. The departure level has 20 rows of check-in desks each with 10 single desks making a total of 200 check-in desks. The terminal hosts eight airline lounges: two for Qantas, and one each for The House, Air New Zealand, Singapore Airlines, Emirates, American Express, and SkyTeam.

=== Terminal 2 ===
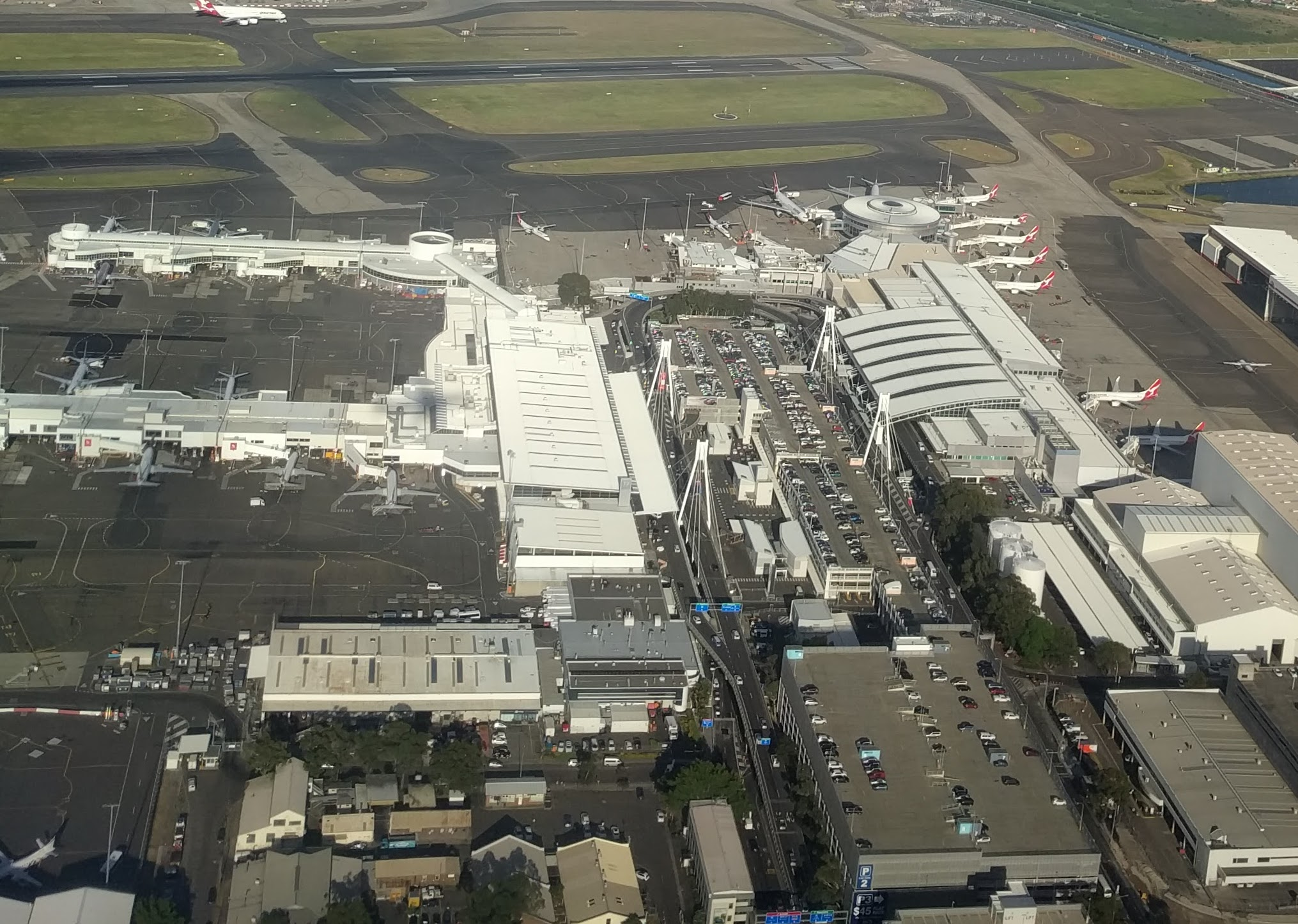
Terminals 2 (left) and 3 (right)

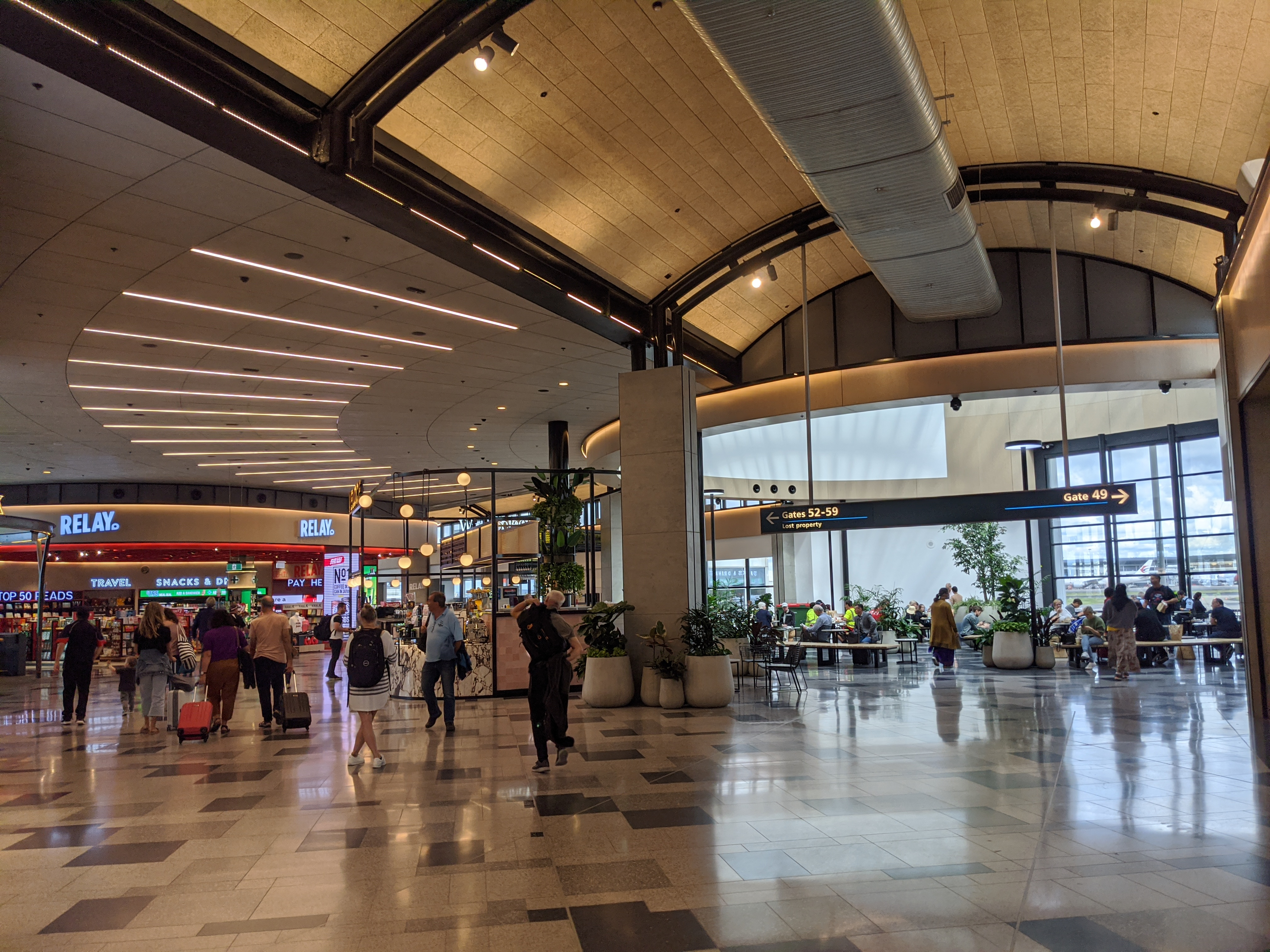
Terminal 2 airside

Terminal 2, located in the airport's northeastern section, is a domestic terminal and the former home of Ansett Australia's domestic operations. It features 20 parking bays served by aerobridges and several remote bays for regional aircraft. It serves Jetstar, Virgin Australia, Rex Airlines and Link Airways. Virgin Australia has a lounge for its customers in the terminal which features a dedicated entrance from the passenger drop-off area as well as its own security screening.

The terminal was first opened in 1939–1940 as the terminal building for Australian National Airways (ANA). It was expanded in July 1952. The ANA terminal was included in the sale of ANA to Ansett in 1957. It was upgraded and modernised in 1974–1975 with a new baggage handling system, moving walkways, air-conditioned departure lounges and aerobridges. It also had a covered bridge from the domestic car park to the terminal.

During the 1990s, the terminal was upgraded and redevelopment twice. The first redevelopment was announced in 1989, and included a new western concourse, new boarding lounges at the existing concourse and new aircraft-parking positions. This was to create additional gates for other airlines, required as part of the new 30-year lease for the terminal that Ansett had signed with the federal government. The second redevelopment completed before the 2000 Summer Olympic Games for A$170 million.

After Ansett's collapse in 2002, Ansett's administrators sold the terminal lease to the airport for A$200 million, and the terminal became open to all airline operators, including Qantas's regional carriers (QantasLink) and Virgin Blue (now Virgin Australia). QantasLink moved from Terminal 2 to Terminal 3 in 2013.

=== Terminal 3 ===
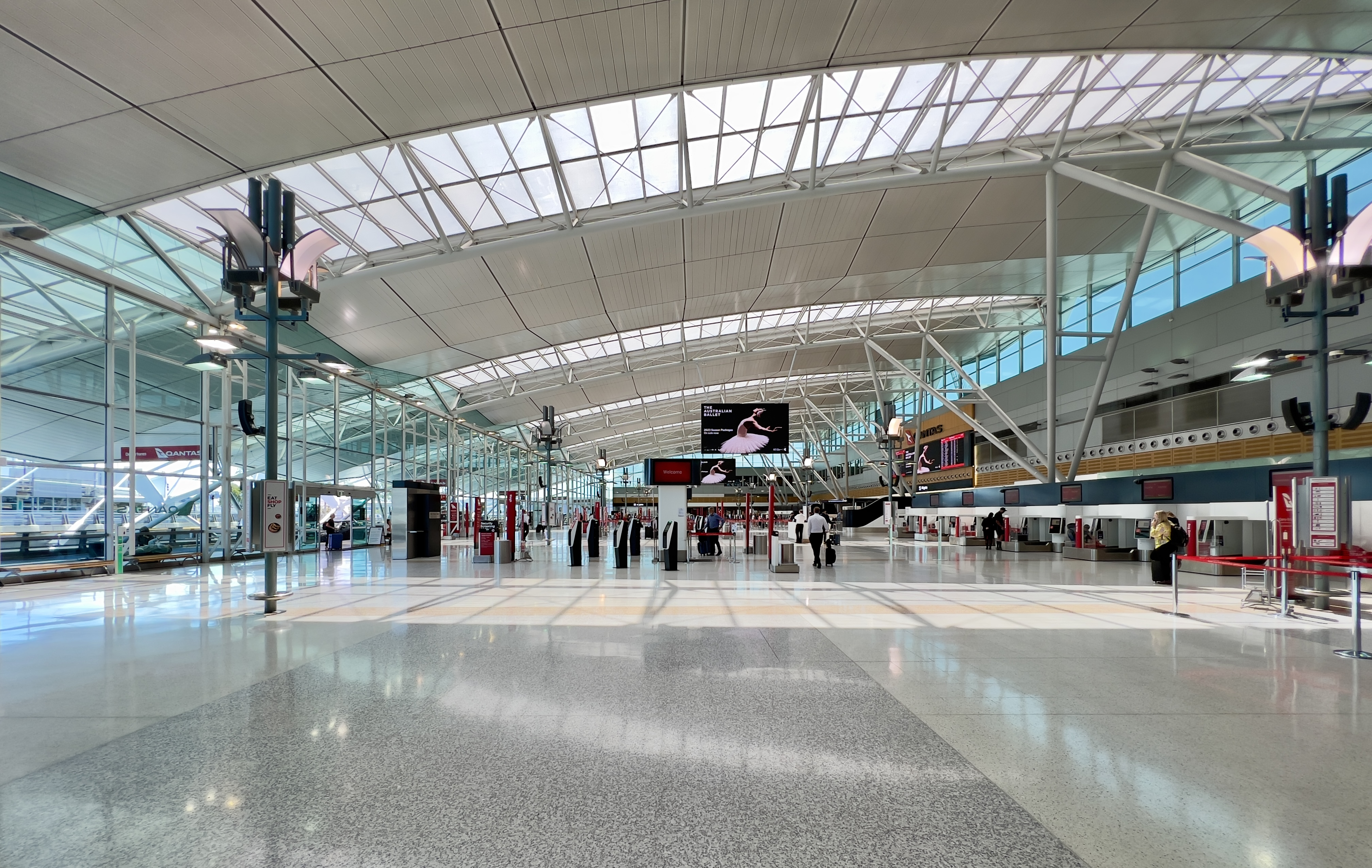
Terminal 3 check-in area

Terminal 3 is a domestic terminal serving Qantas and QantasLink flights. It was initially home to Trans Australia Airlines (TAA, later named Australian Airlines), with Australian Airlines signing a 30 year lease for the terminal with the federal government in 1989. Since the merger of Australian Airlines and Qantas in 1994, the terminal exclusively serves under the Qantas brand. In 2015, Qantas sold its lease of Terminal 3, which was due to continue until 2019, back to Sydney Airport for $535 million. This means Sydney Airport resumes operational responsibility of the terminal, including the lucrative retail areas. Qantas would retain priority usage for the check-in and baggage facilities and departure gates until mid-2025.

The TAA terminal was built in 1974, occupying the site of the former Overseas Passenger Terminal. The current terminal building is largely the result of extensions designed by Hassell and completed in 1999. This included the construction of a 60-metre (197 ft) roof span above a new column-free check-in hall and resulted in extending the terminal footprint to 80,000 square metres (860,000 sq ft). Since the opening of the terminal in 1974, the original airport terminal building built in 1940 was incorporated into the southwest portion of the newer terminal and is currently near gates 17 to 19 of Terminal 3 (as of 2024).

The terminal is located in the northeastern section adjacent to Terminal 2, with which it shares an underground train station. There are 14 parking bays served by aerobridges, including two served by dual aerobridges. Terminal 3 features a large Qantas Club lounge, along with a dedicated Business Class and Chairman's lounge. Terminal 3 also has a 'Heritage Collection' located adjacent to gate 13, dedicated to Qantas and including many collections from the airline's 90-plus years of service. It also has a view of the airport's apron and is used commonly by plane-spotters.

=== Former Express Terminal ===
Sydney Airport previously had a fourth passenger terminal, east of Terminal 2. This was known as Domestic Express or simply Express Terminal. Construction of the terminal and adjacent aircraft parking aprons was completed in "a record 56 days", and operations began on 5 June 2000 with an official opening on 18 July that year. It was used by Hazelton Airlines (later Rex Airlines) and low-cost carriers Virgin Blue and the now-defunct Impulse Airlines (until May 2001). Following Ansett's collapse and the airport's purchase of the Ansett terminal in 2002, the airlines at the Express Terminal began moving to the former Ansett terminal (Terminal 2). Virgin Blue was last to use the Express Terminal and moved to Terminal 2 on 12 December 2002. The former express terminal is now used as an office building.

=== Freight terminals ===
The airport is a major hub for freight transport to and from Australia, handling approximately 45 percent of the national cargo traffic. Therefore, it is equipped with extensive freight facilities including seven dedicated cargo terminals operated by several handlers.

== Airlines and destinations ==
=== Passenger ===
Airlines	Destinations
Air Canada	Toronto–Pearson, Vancouver
Air China	Beijing–Capital
Air India	Delhi–Indira Gandhi
Air New Zealand	Auckland, Christchurch, Queenstown, Wellington
Air Niugini	Port Moresby
Air Tahiti Nui	Papeete (resumes 15 December 2026)
Aircalin	Nouméa
All Nippon Airways	Tokyo–Haneda
American Airlines	Los Angeles
Asiana Airlines	Seoul–Incheon
Batik Air Malaysia	Denpasar, Kuala Lumpur–International
Beijing Capital Airlines	Qingdao
British Airways	London–Heathrow, Singapore
Cathay Pacific	Hong Kong
Cebu Pacific	Manila
China Airlines	Taipei–Taoyuan
China Eastern Airlines	Beijing-Daxing, Jinan, Nanjing, Shanghai–Pudong, Wuhan
China Southern Airlines	Guangzhou, Shenzhen
Delta Air Lines	Los Angeles
Emirates	Christchurch, Dubai–International
Etihad Airways	Abu Dhabi
Fiji Airways	Nadi
FlyPelican	Newcastle
Garuda Indonesia	Denpasar, Jakarta–Soekarno-Hatta
Hainan Airlines	Haikou
Hawaiian Airlines	Honolulu
Hong Kong Airlines	Hong Kong
Japan Airlines	Tokyo–Haneda
Jetstar	Adelaide, Auckland, Avalon, Ayers Rock, Ballina, Brisbane, Busselton, Cairns, Christchurch, Darwin, Denpasar, Gold Coast, Hamilton, Hervey Bay, Ho Chi Minh City, Hobart, Launceston, Melbourne, Nadi, Osaka–Kansai, Perth, Phuket, Port Vila, Proserpine, Queenstown, Rarotonga, Seoul–Incheon, Sunshine Coast, Townsville
Juneyao Air	Shanghai–Pudong
Korean Air	Seoul–Incheon
LATAM Chile	Santiago de Chile
Malaysia Airlines	Kuala Lumpur–International
Philippine Airlines	Manila
Qantas	Adelaide, Alice Springs, Apia–Faleolo, Auckland, Ayers Rock, Bangkok–Suvarnabhumi, Bengaluru, Brisbane, Cairns, Christchurch, Dallas–Fort Worth, Darwin, Denpasar, Gold Coast, Hamilton Island, Hobart, Hong Kong, Honolulu, Jakarta–Soekarno-Hatta, Johannesburg–O. R. Tambo, London–Heathrow, Los Angeles, Manila, Melbourne, Nadi, New York–JFK, Norfolk Island, Nouméa, Nuku'alofa, Paris–Charles de Gaulle, Perth, Port Moresby, Queenstown, San Francisco, Santiago de Chile, Singapore, Sunshine Coast, Tokyo–Haneda, Vancouver, Wellington; Seasonal: Broome, Cape Town (begins 19 October 2027), Las Vegas (begins 29 December 2026), Rome–Fiumicino, Sapporo–Chitose
QantasLink	Albury, Armidale, Ballina, Bendigo, Broken Hill, Canberra, Coffs Harbour, Dubbo, Griffith, Hobart, Launceston, Merimbula, Mildura, Moree, Orange, Port Macquarie, Sunshine Coast, Tamworth, Toowoomba, Wagga Wagga; Seasonal: Cooma
Qatar Airways	Doha
Rex Airlines	Albury, Broken Hill, Coffs Harbour, Dubbo, Griffith, Merimbula, Moruya, Narrandera, Parkes, Wagga Wagga
Scoot	Singapore
Shenzhen Airlines	Shenzhen (begins 14 December 2026)
Sichuan Airlines	Chengdu–Tianfu
Singapore Airlines	Singapore
Skytrans Australia	Lord Howe Island
SriLankan Airlines	Colombo–Bandaranaike
Starlux Airlines	Auckland, Taipei–Taoyuan (both begin 24 March 2027)
Thai Airways International	Bangkok–Suvarnabhumi
Tianjin Airlines	Chongqing, Zhengzhou
Trinity Airways	Seoul–Incheon
Turkish Airlines	Istanbul, Singapore
United Airlines	Los Angeles, San Francisco; Seasonal: Houston–Intercontinental
VietJet Air	Ho Chi Minh City
Vietnam Airlines	Hanoi, Ho Chi Minh City
Virgin Australia	Adelaide, Ballina, Brisbane, Cairns, Canberra, Denpasar, Doha, Gold Coast, Hamilton Island, Hobart, Launceston, Melbourne, Nadi, Perth, Queenstown, Sunshine Coast; Seasonal: Darwin
XiamenAir	Xiamen

International destinations from Sydney Airport

Qantas also operates dedicated "flightseeing" services over Antarctica from Sydney. These flights, using a Boeing 787 Dreamliner, depart Sydney from Terminal 3, and provide a guided aerial tour of Antarctica before returning to Australia. These flights are about thirteen hours in total.

=== Cargo ===
Airlines	Destinations
ASL Airlines Australia	Auckland, Christchurch
Atlas Air	Auckland, Bangkok–Suvarnabhumi, Chongqing, Honolulu, Melbourne, Shanghai–Pudong
Cathay Cargo	Hong Kong, Melbourne
China Southern Cargo	Guangzhou
Emirates SkyCargo	Hong Kong
FedEx Express	Auckland, Guangzhou, Honolulu, Oakland, Singapore
MASkargo	Kuala Lumpur–International
Qantas Freight	Anchorage, Auckland, Bangkok–Suvarnabhumi, Brisbane, Chicago–O'Hare, Chongqing, Christchurch, Gold Coast, Hong Kong, Honolulu, Jakarta–Soekarno–Hatta, Los Angeles, Melbourne, New York–JFK, Perth, Shanghai–Pudong, Singapore
Singapore Airlines Cargo	Auckland, Singapore
Team Global Express	Brisbane
UPS Airlines	Honolulu, Seoul–Incheon, Shanghai–Pudong, Shenzhen, Singapore

== Traffic and statistics ==
=== Total ===
Annual passenger statistics for Sydney Airport
Year	Domestic	International	Total	Change
1986	6,813,214	3,086,337	9,899,551	▲8.2%
1987	7,263,516	3,569,509	10,833,025	▲9.4%
1988	8,147,928	4,106,460	12,254,388	▲13.1%
1989	6,130,660	4,026,296	10,156,956	▼ -17.1%
1990	7,531,145	4,264,091	11,795,236	▲16.1%
1991	9,865,363	4,220,272	14,085,635	▲19.4%
1992	10,452,632	4,505,656	14,958,288	▲6.2%
1993	11,089,393	4,778,015	15,867,408	▲6.1%
1994	12,343,096	5,358,494	17,701,590	▲11.6%
1995	13,213,552	5,838,494	19,052,003	▲7.6%
1996	13,901,680	6,477,744	20,379,424	▲7.0%
1997	14,070,134	6,840,696	20,910,830	▲2.6%
1998	14,275,077	6,933,551	21,208,628	▲1.4%
1999	14,877,901	7,388,153	22,266,054	▲5.0%
2000	16,240,310	8,237,223	24,477,533	▲9.9%
2001	16,563,296	8,228,973	24,792,269	▲1.3%
2002	15,187,908	8,006,775	23,194,683	▼ -6.4%
2003	16,548,322	7,929,841	24,478,163	▲5.5%
2004	18,246,249	8,951,825	27,198,074	▲11.1%
2005	18,940,167	9,515,983	28,456,150	▲4.6%
2006	20,119,000	9,865,970	29,984,970	▲5.4%
2007	21,469,055	10,378,240	31,847,295	▲6.2%
2008	22,345,905	10,552,900	32,898,805	▲3.3%
2009	22,362,772	10,635,270	32,998,042	▲0.3%
2010	24,194,804	11,455,537	35,650,341	▲8.0%
2011	23,925,351	11,748,582	35,673,933	▲0.1%
2012	24,638,877	12,369,193	37,008,070	▲3.7%
2013	25,216,661	12,933,885	38,150,546	▲3.1%
2014	25,417,107	13,315,835	38,732,942	▲1.5%
2015	25,897,619	13,911,228	39,808,847	▲2.8%
2016	26,905,944	15,111,977	42,017,921	▲5.5%
2017	27,291,874	16,038,186	43,330,060	▲3.1%
2018	27,667,273	16,762,485	44,429,758	▲2.5%
2019	27,538,404	16,890,441	44,428,845	▼0.0%
2020	7,444,780	3,782,912	11,227,692	▼ -74.7%
2021	7,171,759	729,529	7,901,288	▼ -29.6%
2022	20,872,921	8,110,953	28,983,874	▲266.8%
2023	24,110,000	14,540,000	38,650,000	▲33.5%
2024	25,090,000	16,300,000	41,390,000	▲7.1%
2025	25,360,000	17,170,000	42,540,000	▲2.8%

=== Domestic ===
Sydney Airport handled 25.094 million domestic passengers in the financial year ending 30 June 2025, an increase of 1.5% compared to the year prior.

Top 15 busiest domestic routes from Sydney (year ending 30 June 2025)
Rank	Airport	Passengers	% Change
1	Melbourne	8,055,760	▲1.7%
2	Brisbane	4,358,778	▲0.8%
3	Gold Coast	2,465,829	▼ -2.1%
4	Adelaide	1,890,067	▲2.5%
5	Perth	1,717,885	▲6.7%
6	Cairns	917,860	▲0.8%
7	Hobart	830,126	▲8.4%
8	Sunshine Coast	780,350	▲1.0%
9	Canberra	629,470	▲1.8%
10	Ballina	505,592	▼ -2.3%
11	Launceston	347,846	▲2.5%
12	Hamilton Island	252,447	▲4.8%
13	Coffs Harbour	205,008	▼ -1.7%
14	Dubbo	170,580	▼ -4.1%
15	Port Macquarie	164,366	▼ -1.8%

=== International ===
Sydney Airport handled 17.262 million international passengers in the year ending 31 December 2025.

Busiest international routes (year ending 30 June 2026)
Rank	Airport	Passengers handled	% change	Airlines
1	Singapore	1,758,167	▲4.0	British Airways, Qantas, Scoot, Singapore Airlines
2	Auckland	1,321,410	▼1.1	Air New Zealand, China Eastern Airlines, Jetstar, Qantas
3	Hong Kong	1,065,358	▲18.0	Cathay Pacific, Hong Kong Airlines, Qantas
4	Denpasar	846,035	▼2.9	Batik Air Malaysia, Garuda Indonesia, Jetstar, Qantas, Virgin Australia
5	Seoul-Incheon	793,653	▲7.4	Asiana Airlines, Jetstar, Korean Air, T'way Air
6	Tokyo-Haneda	786,071	▲3.4	All Nippon Airways, Japan Airlines, Qantas
7	Los Angeles	746,090	▼6.8	American Airlines, Delta Air Lines, Qantas, United Airlines
8	Kuala Lumpur	636,576	▲25.7	AirAsia X, Batik Air Malaysia, Malaysia Airlines, Turkish Airlines
9	Dubai	623,956	▼23.2	Emirates
10	Nadi	576,342	▼1.2	Fiji Airways, Jetstar, Qantas, Virgin Australia
11	Guangzhou	531,074	▲28.9	China Southern Airlines
12	Bangkok	522,785	▼10.8	Qantas, Thai Airways International
13	Queenstown	490,181	▲12.7	Air New Zealand, Jetstar, Qantas, Virgin Australia
14	Manila	472,994	▲0.6	Cebu Pacific, Philippine Airlines, Qantas
15	Ho Chi Minh City	447,614	▲9.5	Jetstar, VietJet Air, Vietnam Airlines

=== Freight ===
Annual International freight statistics for Sydney Airport (tonnes)
Year	Inbound	Outbound	Total	Change
1985	71,619	55,111	126,730	Steady
1986	64,836	69,533	134,369	▲6.0%
1987	71,242	86,956	158,198	▲17.8%
1988	84,693	84,330	169,023	▲6.8%
1989	106,360	87,598	193,957	▲14.8%
1990	106,058	89,718	195,776	▲0.9%
1991	104,752	88,747	193,499	▼ -1.2%
1992	115,170	106,466	221,646	▲14.5%
1993	120,307	122,626	242,932	▲9.6%
1994	144,294	134,619	278,912	▲14.8%
1995	143,824	145,185	289,008	▲3.6%
1996	149,188	154,773	303,961	▲5.2%
1997	170,072	168,852	338,924	▲11.5%
1998	172,207	163,293	335,500	▼ -1.4%
1999	188,906	160,868	349,774	▲4.3%
2000	183,965	144,786	328,751	▼ -6.0%
2001	161,231	144,586	305,817	▼ -7.0%
2002	163,038	142,342	305,380	▼ -0.1%
2003	166,441	120,720	287,162	▼ -6.0%
2004	203,747	119,856	323,604	▲12.7%
2005	228,016	118,547	346,563	▲7.1%
2006	240,962	122,338	363,300	▲4.8%
2007	250,408	129,355	379,763	▲4.5%
2008	252,217	122,322	374,540	▲ -1.4%
2009	230,367	119,567	349,935	▼ -6.6%
2010	267,728	123,332	391,060	▲ -11.7%
2011	284,622	123,972	408,593	▲ -4.5%
2012	292,830	125,413	418,242	▲2.4%
2013	282,878	130,691	413,569	▼ -1.1%
2014	270,656	140,428	411,084	▼ -0.6%
2015	265,216	178,158	443,374	▲7.9%
2016	274,071	203,206	477,277	▲7.6%
2017	297,206	214,177	511,383	▲7.1%
2018	310,569	232,719	543,289	▲6.2%
2019	291,808	229,205	521,014	▼ -4.1%
2020	304,366	229,355	533,721	▲2.4%
2021	339,364	228,982	568,346	▲6.5%
2022	334,357	201,768	536,125	▼ -5.7%
2023	300,628	181,983	482,711	▼ -10.0%
2024	355,943	196,735	552,679	▲14.5%
2025	355,111	158,720	513,830	▼ -7.0%

== Ground transport ==
=== Road ===
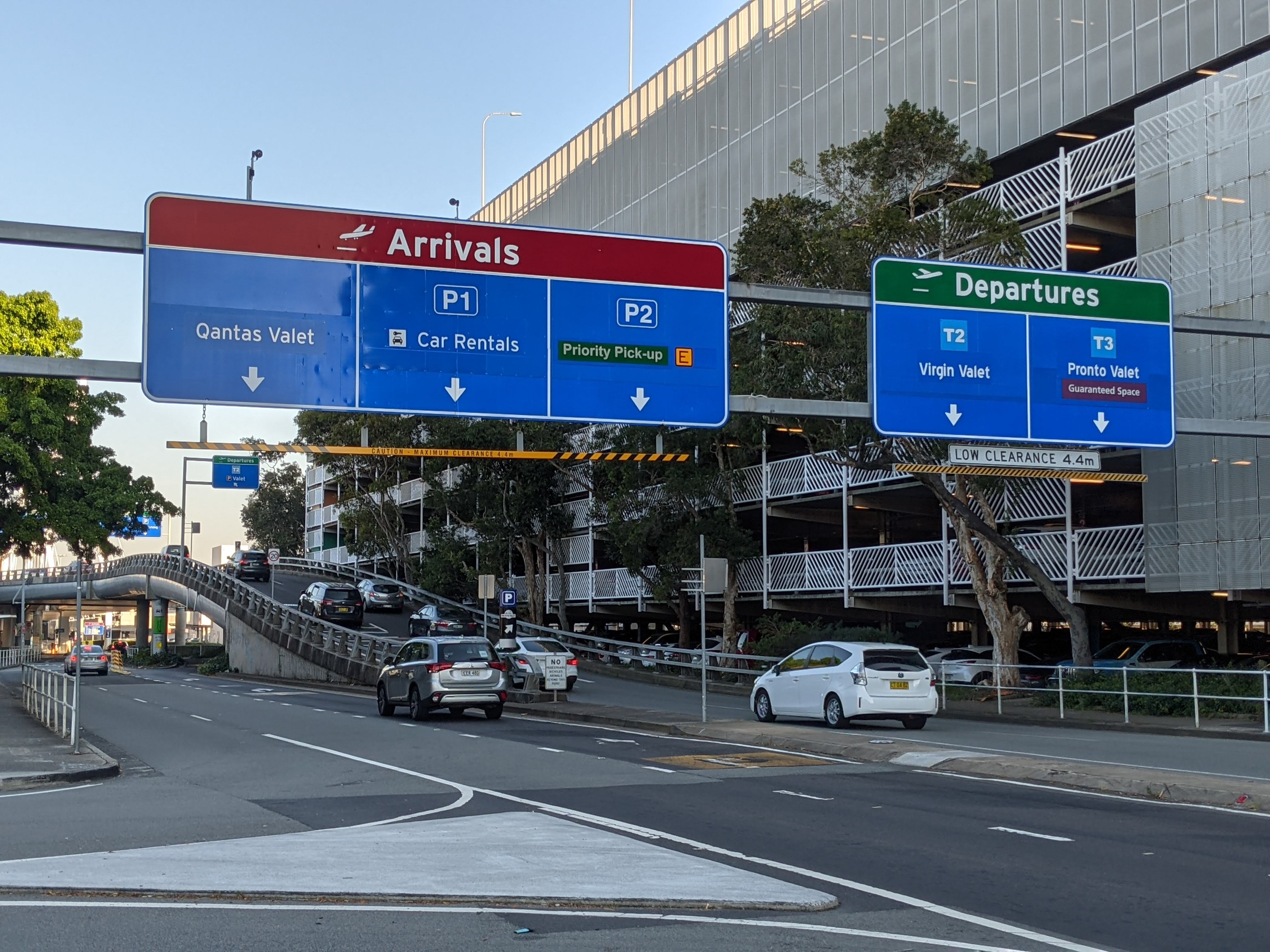
Road entrance towards Terminals 2 and 3

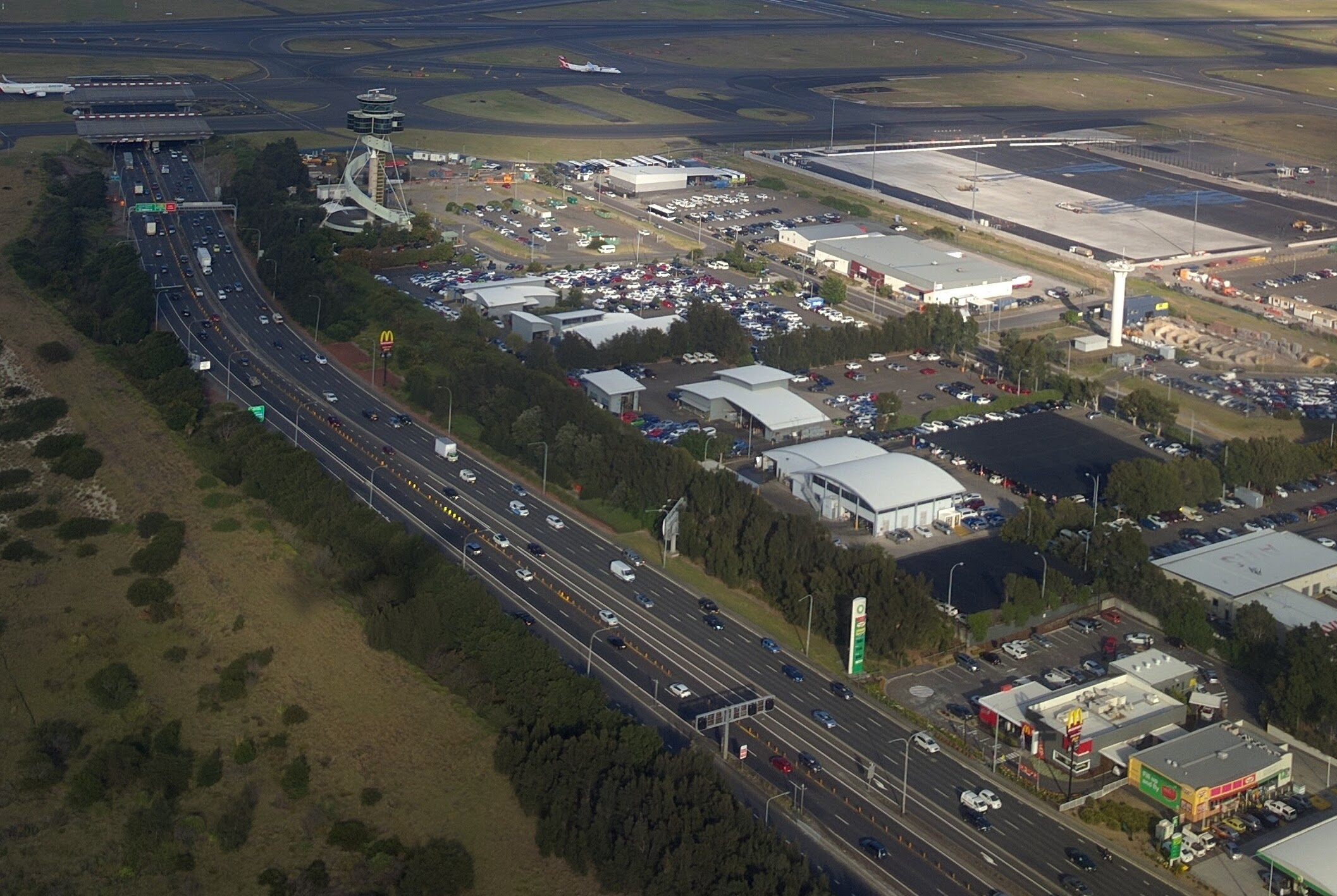
View of the General Holmes Drive underpass

Sydney Airport has road connections in all directions. Southern Cross Drive (M1), a motorway, is the fastest toll-free link to the city centre. The M5 South Western Motorway (including the M5 East Freeway) links the airport with the south-western suburbs of Sydney. A ring road runs around the airport consisting of Airport Drive, Qantas Drive, General Holmes Drive, M5 East Freeway and Marsh Street. General Holmes Drive features a tunnel under the main north–south runway and three taxiways as well as providing access to an aircraft viewing area. Inside the airport a part-ring road – Ross Smith Avenue (named after Ross MacPherson Smith) – connects the Domestic Terminal with the control tower, the general aviation area, car-rental company storage yards, long-term car park, heliport, various retail operations and a hotel. A perimeter road runs inside the secured area for authorised vehicles only.

Since 2024, Sydney Gateway, a major road interchange now connects between the WestConnex M8 Motorway and Sydney Airport's terminals. The project provides a motorway-grade road directly from the terminals to Sydney's CBD, Parramatta and the south-western suburbs. Construction began in 2021 and was completed in mid 2024.

The airport runs several official car parks—Domestic Short Term, Domestic Remote Long Term, and International Short/Long Term.

The International Terminal is located beside a wide pedestrian and bicycle path. It links Mascot and Sydney City in the north-east with Tempe (via a foot bridge over Alexandra Canal) and Botany Bay to the south-west. All terminals offer bicycle racks and are also easily accessible by foot from nearby areas.

=== Public transport ===
==== Rail ====
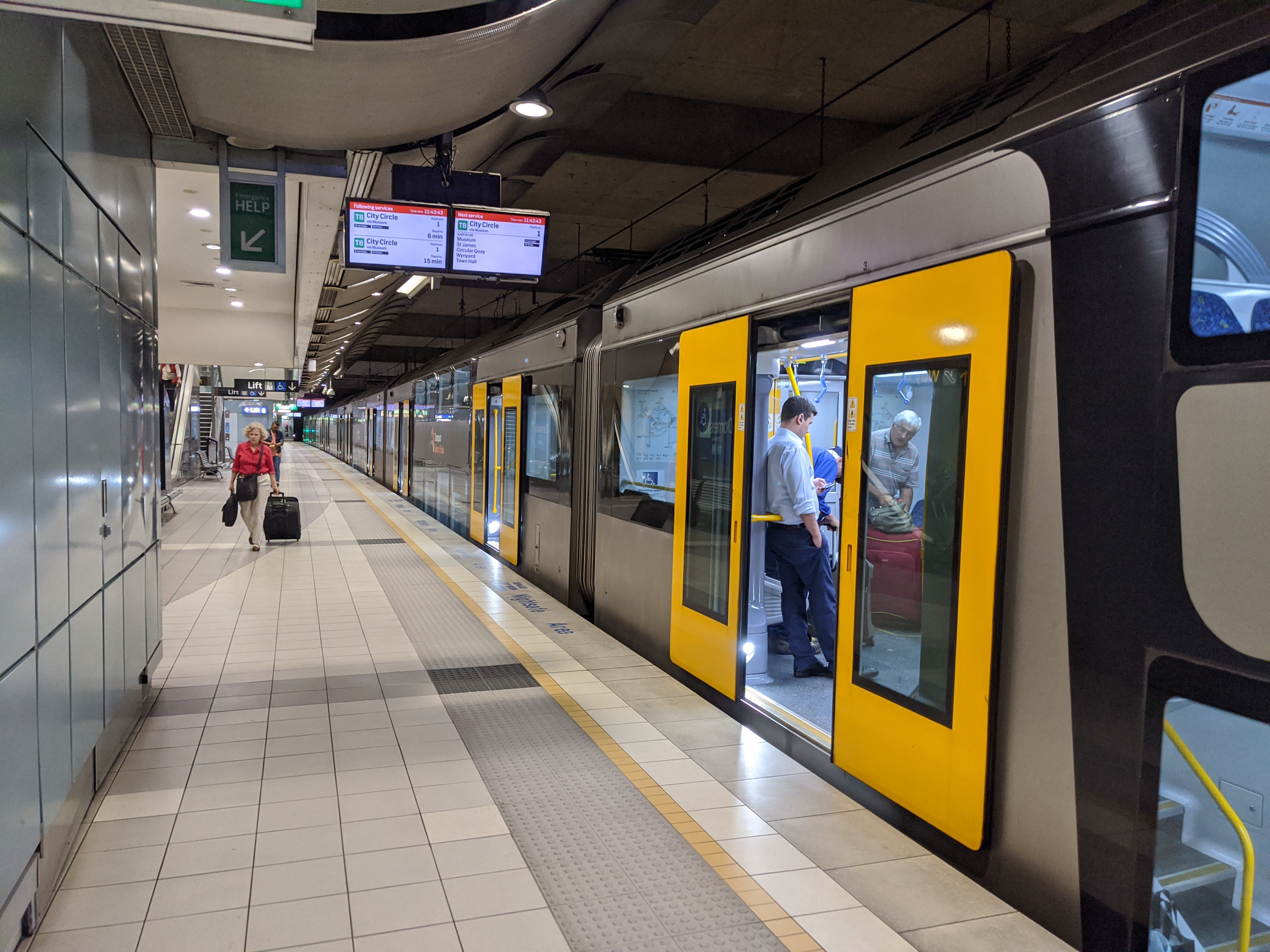
Domestic Airport station on the Sydney Trains Airport & South Line

The airport is accessible via Sydney Trains T8 Airport & South Line, providing regular service to the Sydney CBD and the southwestern suburbs, using the Airport Link tunnel. The International Airport station is located below the International terminal (Terminal 1), while the Domestic Airport station is located under the car park between the domestic terminals (Terminal 2 and Terminal 3). While the stations are part of the Sydney Trains suburban network, they are privately owned and operated by the Airport Link Company and their use is subject to a surcharge. The trains that service the airport are regular suburban trains. Unlike airport trains at some other airports, these do not have special provisions for customers with luggage, do not operate express to the airport, and may have all seats occupied by commuters before the trains arrive at the airport.

The airport station surcharge may be avoided by passengers alighting at nearby stations and walking to either the International Terminal (from Wolli Creek station, about 1.6 km) or the Domestic Terminal (from Mascot station, about 1.8 km).

==== Bus ====
Transdev John Holland operates route 350 from the domestic terminal to Bondi Junction railway station while Transit Systems operates route 420 from Mascot railway station to Westfield Burwood via both International and Domestic terminals, as well as Banksia and Rockdale railway stations.

Super Shuttle WSI electric buses services commenced on 25 October 2026, operating between the domestic terminals (T2 and T3) and Western Sydney Airport.

== Accidents and incidents ==
- On 10 September 1920, Arthur Herbert Tattle of Wellington, New Zealand, was killed on the runway at Mascot when he was struck on the crown of his head by a plane taking off. He had come to see two friends take off on the plane and was standing on the runway in the flight path with a camera looking down at the viewfinder when he failed to notice the speed of the fast approaching plane, its height or the shouted warning from the pilot. He was driven to South Sydney Hospital where he died soon after from "a concussion of the brain". An inquiry into the incident returned a finding of "accidental death" and was reported to be the first inquest in New South Wales resulting from an aeroplane accident.
- On 19 July 1945 a Consolidated C-87 Liberator Express operated by the Royal Air Force (RAF) bound for Manus Island failed to gain altitude after taking off from Sydney's now non-existent runway 22, struck trees and crashed into Muddy Creek, north of Brighton-Le-Sands. The aircraft exploded on impact, killing all 12 passengers and crew on board. All the victims were service personnel, five from the RAF, one from the Royal New Zealand Air Force and six from the Royal Navy.
- On 30 November 1961, Ansett-ANA Flight 325, a Vickers Viscount, crashed into Botany Bay shortly after take-off. The starboard (right) wing failed after the aircraft flew into a thunderstorm. All 15 people on board were killed.
- On 22 February 1970, a teenage boy from Randwick climbed into the wheel well of a Douglas DC-8 of Japan Air Lines operating as Flight 772. As the plane was taking off bound for Tokyo, he fell to his death with a photographer accidentally capturing the incident.
- On 4 April 1979, a hijacker attempted to take over a Boeing 747SP of Pan Am registered as N530PA and operating as Flight 816 parked at the airport. He managed to get past the immigration and security screening. He then grabbed a female hostage and made some demands. Police were able to fatally shoot him; he later died of his injuries.
- On 21 February 1980, a Beechcraft Super King Air registered VH-AAV and operating Advance Airlines Flight 4210 took off from Sydney Airport and suffered an engine failure. The pilot flew the aircraft back to the airport and attempted to land but crashed into the sea wall surrounding runway 16/34 (now 16R/34L). All 13 people on board died in the accident.
- On 24 April 1994, a Douglas DC-3 registered VH-EDC of South Pacific Airmotive had an engine malfunction shortly after take-off on a charter flight to Norfolk Island. The engine was feathered but airspeed decayed and it was found to be impossible to maintain height. A successful ditching was carried out into Botany Bay. All four crew and 21 passengers - pupils and teachers of Scots College and journalists, travelling to participate in Anzac Day commemorations on Norfolk Island - safely evacuated the aircraft. The investigation revealed that the aircraft was overloaded and the propeller was not fully feathered.
- On 8 November 2024, Qantas Flight 520, a Boeing 737-800, suffered a contained engine failure on takeoff from the airport due to separation of a turbine blade. The takeoff continued, and the aircraft made an emergency landing back at Sydney with no injuries occurring. Debris from the engine ignited a grass fire besides the runway, disrupting airport operations for several hours.

== Planespotting ==
Planespotting at YSSY is a popular activity among aviation enthusiasts, with the airport’s location and high volume of traffic providing numerous opportunities to observe aircraft throughout the day. A wide variety of aircraft can be seen, such as domestic narrow-body airliners, regional aircraft, long-haul wide-body jets, cargo aircraft, private aircraft and occasional military or special-purpose aircraft. The aircraft operating at any given time vary according to airline schedules, runway configuration, weather conditions and other operational factors.

Several public areas around the airport are commonly used for planespotting and aircraft photography. These include Shep’s Mound, the nearby beach, and the Rydges Sydney Airport Hotel. The aircraft visible from each location depend largely on the runway configuration in use, with different approaches and departure paths providing different viewing opportunities. The combination of frequent traffic, varied aircraft and changing runway operations makes YSSY a particularly active location for planespotters.

== Second airport ==
The local, state and federal governments have investigated the viability of building a second major airport in Sydney since the 1940s. Significant passenger growth at Sydney Airport indicates the potential need for a second airport – for example, total passenger numbers increased from less than 10 million in 1985–86 to over 25 million in 2000–01 and over 40 million in 2015–16. This growth is expected to continue, with Sydney region passenger demand forecast to reach 87 million passengers by 2035.

On 15 April 2014, the Federal Government announced that Badgerys Creek would be Sydney's second international airport, to be known as Western Sydney Airport. Press releases suggest that the airport will not be subject to curfews and will open in phases, initially with a single airport runway and terminal. It would be linked to Sydney Airport by local roads and motorways, and by extensions to the existing suburban rail network. In May 2017, the Federal Government announced it would build (pay for) the second Sydney Airport after the Sydney Airport Group declined the government's offer to build the second airport.

The new airport started construction in 2018 and opened in 2026.

== See also ==
- List of airports in Greater Sydney
- List of airports in New South Wales
- RAAF Station Mascot
- Transport in Australia
- United States Army Air Forces in Australia (World War II)
