= Max Moore-Wilton =

Max Moore-Wilton AC

Secretary of the Department of the Prime Minister and Cabinet
- In office 13 May 1996 – 20 December 2002
- Preceded by: Michael Keating
- Succeeded by: Peter Shergold

Personal details
- Born: Maxwell William Moore-Wilton; 27 January 1943 (age 83) Sydney, New South Wales, Australia
- Spouse: Jan Moore-Wilton (m. 1966)
- Occupation: Company director; public servant

Maxwell William Moore-Wilton AC (born 27 January 1943) is an Australian corporate executive and former public servant, colloquially known as "Max the Axe".

== Personal Life ==
In December 2002, Moore-Wilton suffered a heart attack prior to taking up as the CEO of Sydney Airport. He had previously survived a run-in with cancer.

== Early career ==
Moore-Wilton served as a senior executive in the Trade and Primary Industries portfolios, General Manager of the Australian Wheat Board, Director-General of the NSW Department of Transport, and the Chief Executive of the Maritime Services Board and the Roads & Traffic Authority, manager of Australian National Line and at the Australian Securities Exchange.

== Secretary of the Department of the Prime Minister and Cabinet ==
Moore-Wilton was appointed Secretary of the Department of Prime Minister and Cabinet with effect from 13 May 1996, shortly after John Howard became Prime Minister.

He immediately implemented cuts of more than 11,000 staff, including six department heads and proceeded to aggressively outsource various government services. He also oversaw the passing of the Public Service Act, 1999 (Cth), which gave the Prime Minister the power to hire and fire heads of departments. As a result, he was accused of turning the public service into an "ideological office family". Paul Barratt, a former Secretary to the Department of Defence, was one such head of department who fell out of favour with his Minister, John Moore. After the Minister sought to dismiss him, Barratt commenced legal action, claiming unfair dismissal and that Moore-Wilton had failed to follow due process. Barratt had a temporary stay, prior to his dismissal, and subsequently losing, on appeal.

Moore-Wilton was heavily involved in the Tampa Affair of August 2001, known as the architect of the plan.

Moore-Wilton's approach as departmental secretary may be encapsulated in an address he gave in 1999 to the Institute of Public Administration Australia:

Ministers and Departments do have an obligation not just to achieve the bottom line that is often the key outcome sought by private companies. We owe it to the community to establish public trust that we work with integrity and put public interest ahead of personal gain. Ensuring the transparency of our processes can focus our minds on the need for each individual decision we take to be justifiable in terms of strict propriety.

— Max Moore-Wilton, 1999.

In announcing Moore-Wilton's resignation from the Australian Public Service, with effect from 20 December 2002, Prime Minister Howard reflected on Moore-Wilton's contributions:

He has oversighted a remarkable period of change for the Public Service which has radically improved its efficiency, effectiveness and relevance. The introduction of a more decentralised financial, employment and industrial relations framework has encouraged a focus on individual performance and agency accountability. This framework is underpinned by the establishment of a service wide set of rules and code of conduct. Mr Moore-Wilton's initiatives have included greater use of Secretary-level or senior-officer task forces to address whole of government issues, including the government's Tough on Drugs' strategy, Coastal Surveillance, bilateral economic relations with New Zealand and People Smuggling. He has made an important contribution to the government's economic reform program, including fiscal consolidation and inter-governmental aspects of the New Tax System. His business knowledge was very useful in recasting the government's industry and investment policies and programs. Other notable achievements include Mr Moore-Wilton's coordination of the Commonwealth's involvement in the 2000 Olympic Games and his active and effective chairmanship of the senior officers Committee that provides advice to the Council of Australian Governments. He has strongly supported me in my capacity as Chairman of the Commonwealth, including in the review of Commonwealth objectives and coordinating the preparations for the highly successful 2002 Commonwealth Heads of Government meeting in Coolum, Queensland. I have particularly valued Mr Moore-Wilton's advice on international relations, trade, defence and security policy. He has performed very effectively as Chairman of the Secretaries Committee on National Security which supports the National Security Committee of Cabinet. He was a key adviser in shaping the Government's response to East Timor, the 2000 Defence White Paper and counter-terrorism measures.

— John Howard, Prime Minister of Australia, 20 December 2002

== Business career ==
In December 2002 Moore-Wilton became the chief executive officer of Sydney Airport Corporation, which was owned by Macquarie Group, Hochtief and the Commonwealth Bank, after the federal government sold it a 99-year lease to operate the airport. During his time there he implemented his familiar cost increases to users and staff cutbacks. In addition, the company announced plans to add a high-rise office block, a multi-level car park and retail space. These plans were controversial, considering the fact that local councils, who usually have jurisdiction over such matters, had none as this was federal government land.

In April 2006, Moore-Wilton resigned as CEO to become Chairman of Sydney Airport Holdings.

Moore-Wilton is a board member of the Committee for Sydney and of Infrastructure NSW.

He is also Chairman of Southern Cross Austereo, the owners of radio station 2Day FM. In 2013 Moore-Wilton caused controversy at an annual general meeting of the company by answering a question from a shareholder that sought to understand whether the company had a cultural problem, when referring to the death of the UK nurse Jacintha Saldanha, who committed suicide after being the subject of a prank telephone call by breakfast radio hosts employed by 2Day FM. Moore-Wilton stated: "These incidents were unfortunate, no doubt about that. In each particular case we thoroughly investigated them and it comes generally within the context of some of these incidents where a whole series of events come together and in the immortal words of someone whose identity I cannot recall "S-H-I-T happens." Moore-Wilton's comments drew widespread criticism, with a British politician calling them "an insult to the memory of a loving mother and wife".

Government offices
Preceded by Michael Keating	Secretary of the Department of the Prime Minister and Cabinet; 1996–2002	Succeeded by Peter Shergold
