= Peter Shergold =

Australian academic and public servant

Peter Shergold AC FRSN
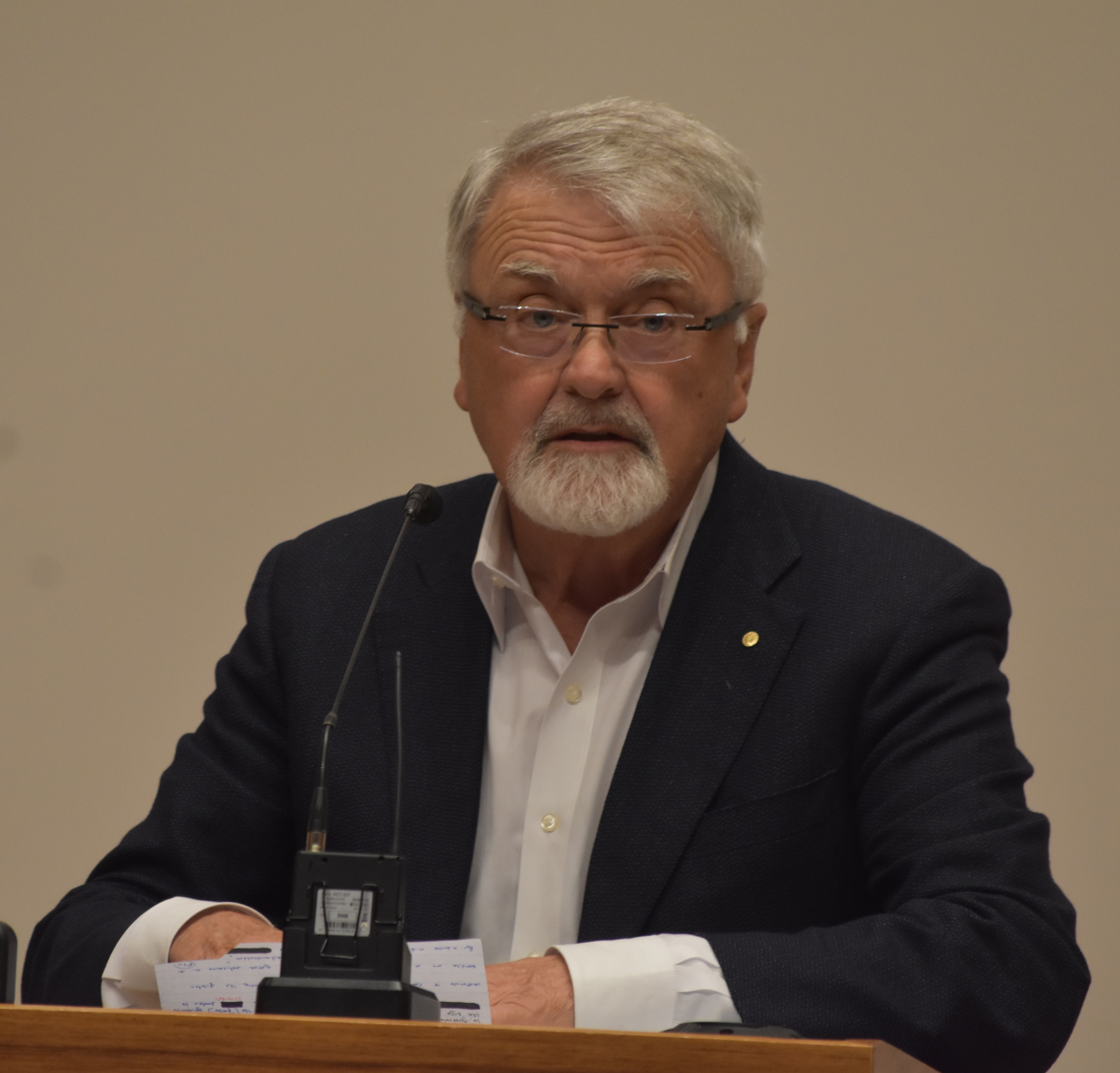
- Shergold in 2025 at Trinity College

Chancellor of Western Sydney University
- In office 1 January 2011 – 31 December 2022
- Preceded by: John Phillips
- Succeeded by: Jennifer Westacott

Secretary of the Department of the Prime Minister and Cabinet
- In office 10 February 2003 – 28 February 2008
- Preceded by: Max Moore-Wilton
- Succeeded by: Terry Moran

Personal details
- Born: Peter Roger Shergold Crawley, Sussex, England
- Occupation: Academic; Public servant; Company director

Peter Roger Shergold is an Australian academic, company director, and former public servant. Shergold was the Chancellor of Western Sydney University from 2011 through 2022.

Between February 2003 and February 2008, he was the Secretary of the Department of the Prime Minister and Cabinet.

== Early life and education ==
Shergold was born in Crawley, Sussex, England.

== Public service career ==
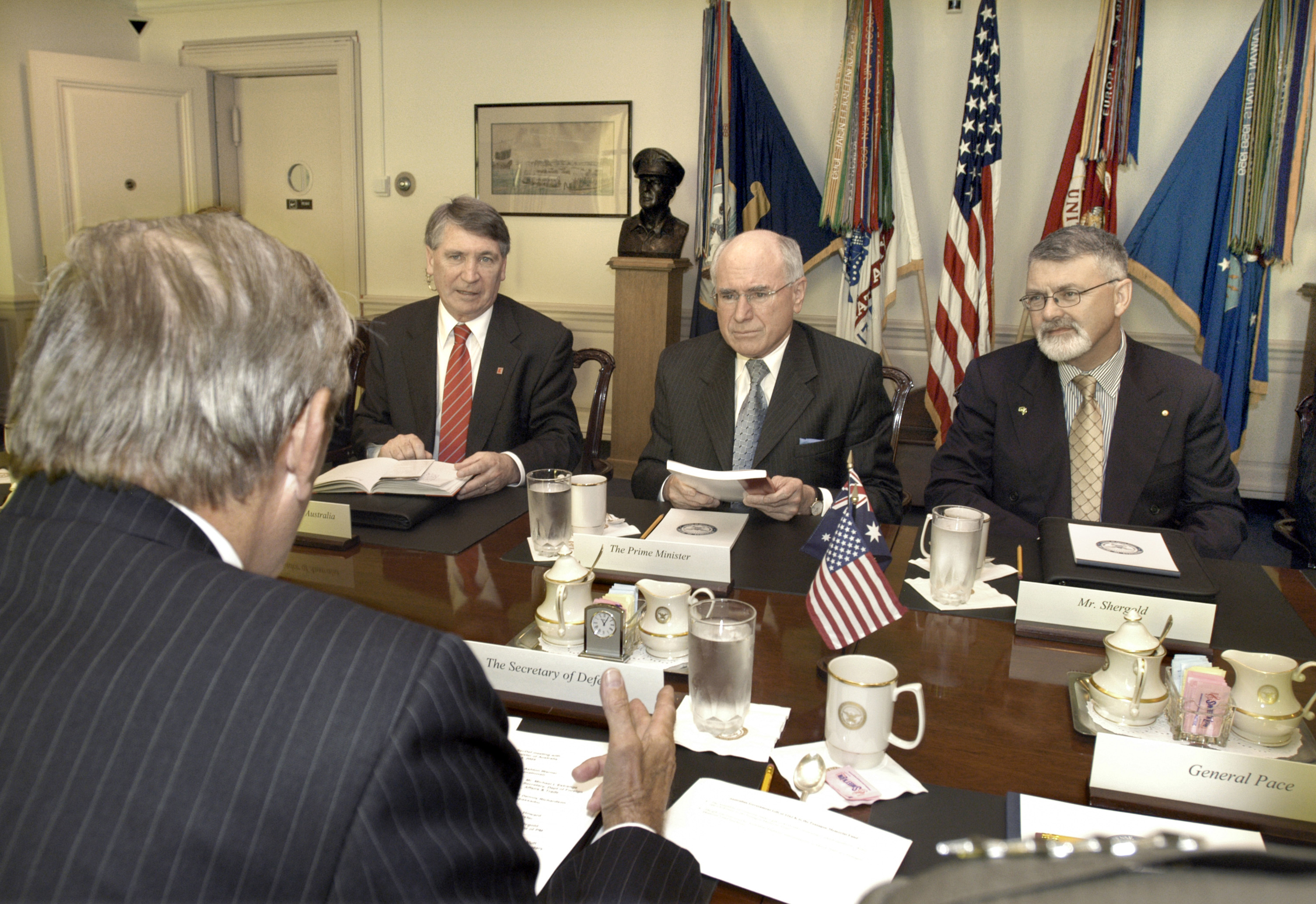
Shergold (right), as Secretary of the Dept of the Prime Minister and Cabinet; with then PM John Howard at a 2005 meeting in the U.S.

In 1987 he began working for the Australian federal government, firstly as head of the newly established Office of Multicultural Affairs.

== Academic and business career ==
After retiring from the Australian public service in February 2008, Shergold became the first head of The Centre for Social Impact, a joint collaboration between the business schools of the University of New South Wales, Melbourne Business School, Swinburne University of Technology and the University of Western Australia.

From 2006 to 2008, Shergold served as the chairman of the Australia and New Zealand School of Government. He is currently a non-executive director of financial services company AMP Limited and Australian law firm Corrs Chambers Westgarth. He is chairman of Opal Aged Care, the National Centre for Vocational Education Research and the Australian Rural Leadership Foundation and serves on the board of the General Sir John Monash Foundation.

In 2011 Shergold became the Chancellor of the University of Western Sydney; and was appointed as chairman of the New South Wales Public Service Commission. In August 2018 Shergold was appointment Chair of the Joblife Employment Board. In December 2019 Shergold was appointed chair of the New South Wales Education Standards Authority. In December 2022, Shergold retired as Chancellor of Western Sydney University after 12 years in the position.

== Honours ==
In 1996, Shergold was appointed a Member of the Order of Australia.

In 2007 he was appointed a Companion of the Order, for service to the community as a significant leader of changes and innovation in the public sector, particularly through the development and implementation of a whole-of-government approach to policy development and program delivery.

Shergold was a recipient of the Centenary Medal in 2001.

Academic offices
Preceded by John Phillips	Chancellor of the University of Western Sydney; 2011–2022	Succeeded by Jennifer Westacott
Government offices
Preceded by Max Moore-Wilton	Secretary of the Department of the Prime Minister and Cabinet; 2003–2008	Succeeded by Terry Moran
Preceded by Steve Sedgwick	Secretary of the Department of Education, Science and Training; 2001–2003	Succeeded by Wendy Jarvie (Acting)
New title Department established	Secretary of the Department of Employment, Workplace Relations and Small Business; 1998–2001	Department abolished
Preceded by David Rosalky	Secretary of the Department of Workplace Relations and Small Business; 1998	Department abolished
Preceded by Dennis Ives	Commissioner of the Australian Public Service; 1995–1998	Succeeded by Helen Williams
