= Secretary of the Department of the Prime Minister and Cabinet (Australia) =

Australian public servant

- Incumbent; Steven Kennedy since 6 June 2022
- Department of the Prime Minister and Cabinet
- Appointer: Prime Minister
- Inaugural holder: Malcolm Shepherd
- Formation: 1 January 1912

The secretary of the Department of the Prime Minister and Cabinet is the public service head of Australia's Department of the Prime Minister and Cabinet and the most senior public servant in the administration of Government in Australia.

The secretary of the Department of the Prime Minister and Cabinet should not be confused with the Cabinet secretary, a ministerial position within the Department of the Prime Minister and Cabinet portfolio responsible for assisting the prime minister in the procedural and operational matters of the Cabinet of Australia.

The secretary of the DPMC is Australia’s highest-paid bureaucrat, earning more than $914,000, as of 2019.

== List of secretaries ==
Below is the list of secretaries, since the first appointment was made on 1 January 1912.

Order	Name	Title	Date appointment commenced	Date appointment ceased	Term in office	Prime Minister(s)	Ref(s)
1	Malcolm Shepherd, CMG	Secretary to the Prime Minister's Department	1 January 1912	27 January 1921	9 years, 26 days	Fisher; Cook; Fisher; Hughes	
2	Percy Deane, CMG	Secretary to the Prime Minister's Department	11 February 1921	31 December 1928	7 years, 324 days	Hughes; Bruce	
3	Sir John McLaren, CMG	Secretary to the Prime Minister's Department	1 January 1929	2 March 1933	4 years, 60 days	Bruce; Scullin; Lyons	
4	John Starling, CMG, OBE	Secretary to the Prime Minister's Department	3 March 1933	10 November 1935	2 years, 252 days	Lyons	
5	Frank Strahan, CVO, CBE	Secretary to the Prime Minister's Department	11 November 1935	25 August 1949	13 years, 287 days	Lyons; Page; Menzies; Fadden; Curtin; Forde; Chifley	
6	Sir Allen Brown, CBE	Secretary to the Prime Minister's Department	25 August 1949	31 December 1958	9 years, 128 days	Menzies	
7	Sir John Bunting, CBE	Secretary to the Prime Minister's Department	1 January 1959	10 March 1968	9 years, 69 days	Menzies; Holt; McEwen; Gorton	
8	Sir Lenox Hewitt, OBE	Secretary to the Prime Minister's Department	11 March 1968	12 March 1971	3 years, 1 day	Gorton; McMahon	
n/a	Sir John Bunting, CBE	Secretary of the Department of the Prime Minister and Cabinet	17 March 1971	31 January 1975	3 years, 320 days	McMahon; Whitlam	
9	John Menadue	Secretary of the Department of the Prime Minister and Cabinet	1 February 1975	30 September 1976	1 year, 242 days	Whitlam; Fraser	
10	Sir Alan Carmody, CBE	Secretary of the Department of the Prime Minister and Cabinet	1 October 1976	12 April 1978^{1}	1 year, 193 days	Fraser	
11	Sir Geoffrey Yeend, AC, CBE	Secretary of the Department of the Prime Minister and Cabinet	18 April 1978	10 February 1986	7 years, 298 days	Fraser; Hawke	
12	Mike Codd, AC	Secretary of the Department of the Prime Minister and Cabinet	10 February 1986	1 December 1991	5 years, 294 days	Hawke	
13	Dr Michael Keating, AC	Secretary of the Department of the Prime Minister and Cabinet	1 December 1991	13 May 1996	4 years, 164 days	Hawke; Keating; Howard	
14	Max Moore-Wilton, AC	Secretary of the Department of the Prime Minister and Cabinet	13 May 1996	20 December 2002	6 years, 221 days	Howard	
15	Dr Peter Shergold, AC	Secretary of the Department of the Prime Minister and Cabinet	10 February 2003	28 February 2008	5 years, 20 days	Howard; Rudd	
16	Terry Moran, AC	Secretary of the Department of the Prime Minister and Cabinet	3 March 2008	5 September 2011	3 years, 186 days	Rudd; Gillard	
17	Dr Ian Watt, AO	Secretary of the Department of the Prime Minister and Cabinet	5 September 2011	30 November 2014	3 years, 86 days	Gillard; Rudd; Abbott	
18	Michael Thawley, AO	Secretary of the Department of the Prime Minister and Cabinet	1 December 2014	23 January 2016	1 year, 53 days	Abbott, Turnbull	
19	Dr Martin Parkinson, AC, PSM	Secretary of the Department of the Prime Minister and Cabinet	23 January 2016	2 September 2019	3 years, 222 days	Turnbull, Morrison	
20	Phil Gaetjens	Secretary of the Department of the Prime Minister and Cabinet	2 September 2019	22 May 2022	2 years, 262 days	Morrison	
21	Stephanie Foster, PSM	Acting Secretary of the Department of the Prime Minister and Cabinet	22 May 2022	5 June 2022	14 days	Albanese	
22	Prof Glyn Davis AC	Secretary of the Department of the Prime Minister and Cabinet	6 June 2022	16 June 2025	4 years, 157 days	Albanese	
23	Steven Kennedy, PSM	Secretary of the Department of the Prime Minister and Cabinet	16 June 2025			Albanese	

Notes
^1 Sir Alan Carmody CBE died suddenly of coronary vascular disease on 12 April 1978; during the term of his appointment.

== Historical arrangements ==
Within days of John Gorton becoming Prime Minister, the functions of the Prime Minister's Department was split and a Department of the Cabinet Office was established. On taking office as Prime Minister in 1971, William McMahon reversed Gorton's changes and restored earlier changes via the creation of the Department of the Prime Minister and Cabinet. A lesser role of Secretary to the Department of the Vice-President of the Executive Council was established for a short time; abolished in the early days of the Whitlam government. Upon election to office in 1996, John Howard established a separate Cabinet Office within the Department of the Prime Minister and Cabinet. The Cabinet Office was a small unit, staffed from within and outside the public service, which provided the Prime Minister with advice on issues before Cabinet as well as strategic policy directions.

=== Secretary to the Department of the Cabinet Office ===
Order	Name	Title	Date appointment commenced	Date appointment ceased	Term in office	Ref(s)
1	Sir John Bunting CBE	Secretary to the Department of the Cabinet Office	11 March 1968	17 March 1971	3 years, 6 days	
2	Michael L'Estrange AO	Secretary to the Cabinet and Head of the Cabinet Policy Unit	8 March 1996	30 June 2000	4 years, 114 days	

=== Secretary to the Department of the Vice-President of the Executive Council ===
Order	Name	Title	Date appointment commenced	Date appointment ceased	Term in office	Ref(s)
1	Sir Lenox Hewitt	Secretary to the Department of the Vice-President of the Executive Council	17 March 1971	20 December 1972	1 year, 278 days	
