= Ian Watt (public servant) =

Australian public servant

Ian Watt AC
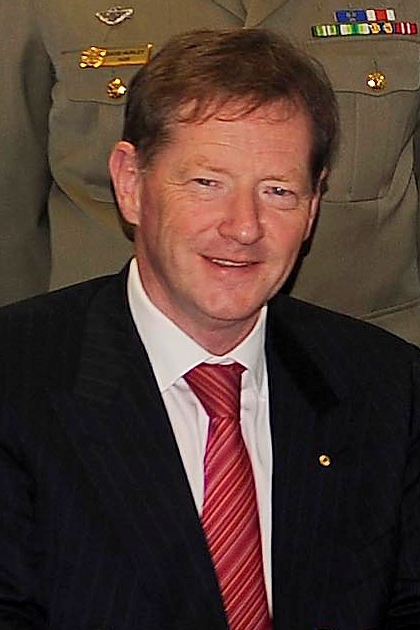
- Ian Watt in 2010

Secretary of the Department of the Prime Minister and Cabinet
- In office 5 September 2011 – 30 November 2014
- Preceded by: Terry Moran
- Succeeded by: Michael Thawley

Secretary of the Department of Defence
- In office 2009–2011

Secretary of the Department of Finance and Deregulation
- In office 3 December 2007 – 2009

Secretary of the Department of Finance and Administration
- In office 23 November 2001 – 3 December 2007

Secretary of the Department of Communications, Information Technology and the Arts
- In office 26 April 2001 – 23 November 2001

Personal details
- Born: Ian James Watt; 18 June 1950 (age 76) Preston, Victoria
- Spouse: Lorraine Watt
- Education: La Trobe University; University of Melbourne; Harvard Business School
- Occupation: Public servant

Ian James Watt AC (born 18 June 1950) is an Australian retired public servant, best known for his time as Secretary of the Department of the Prime Minister and Cabinet from September 2011 to November 2014.

== Background and career ==
Watt was born in Victoria and raised in Reservoir in Melbourne's northern suburbs. He was educated at La Trobe University and joined the Australian Public Service in 1971 in the Victorian Division of the Post Master General's Department. He completed his honours degree at the University of Melbourne before commencing a cadetship with the Department of the Treasury in 1973. Watt completed his master's degree and PhD at La Trobe University before returning to The Treasury in 1985.

He served as Minister (Economic) at the Embassy of Australia in Washington from 1991 to 1994. On his return to Australia, Watt was appointed First Assistant Secretary of the Economic Division, Department of the Prime Minister and Cabinet, from March 1994 to November 1996; and was Deputy Secretary of the Department of the Prime Minister and Cabinet (DPM&C) and Executive Coordinator of the Economic, Industry and Resources Policy Group until March 2001. During his time at DPM&C, Watt completed the Advanced Management Program at the Harvard Business School.

In March 2001, Watt accepted appointment as the Secretary of the Department of Communications, Information Technology and the Arts, until his appointment as Secretary of the Department of Finance and Administration in January 2002. Watt became the longest serving Finance Secretary in April 2009. In August 2009 he accepted appointment as the Secretary of the Department of Defence, until his appointment to the Department of the Prime Minister and Cabinet in September 2011. Watt resigned from the role in November 2014. His departure had been speculated since the Abbott government took office in September 2013.

Watt is the former chair of the Organisation for Economic Co-operation and Development's (OECD's) Working Party of Senior Budget Officials. His appointments since resigning from the public service include directorships with the Grattan Institute and Citigroup Pty Limited.

During April 2016, Watt was appointed Chair of SMART Infrastructure Facility's Advisory Council.

== Honours ==
Watt was appointed an Officer of the Order of Australia in 2008. In 2016 Watt was appointed a Companion of the Order.

== References and further reading ==
- Malone, Paul (2006). "Chapter 4: The Devil's Advocate – Ian Watt, Department of Finance and Administration". Australian department heads under Howard : career paths and practice (PDF). Canberra, Australia: The Australian National University. pp. 21–23. ISBN 1-920942-83-1. Archived from the original (PDF online) on 6 November 2013.
- Meet Australia's most powerful public servants, news.com.au, 31 October 2013, archived from the original on 7 December 2013

Government offices
Preceded by Terry Moran	Secretary of the Department of the Prime Minister and Cabinet; 2011–2014	Succeeded by Michael Thawley
Preceded by Nick Warner	Secretary of the Department of Defence; 2009–2011	Succeeded by Duncan Lewis
Preceded by Himself as Secretary of the Department of Finance and Administration	Secretary of the Department of Finance and Deregulation; 2007–2009	Succeeded by David Tune
Preceded by Peter Boxall	Secretary of the Department of Finance and Administration; 2001–2007	Succeeded by Himself as Secretary of the Department of Finance and Deregulation
Preceded by Neville Stevens	Secretary of the Department of Communications, Information Technology and the Arts; 2001	Succeeded by Helen Williams
