= Sydney Airport Holdings =

Leaseholder company of Sydney Airport

Sydney Airport Corporation Limited
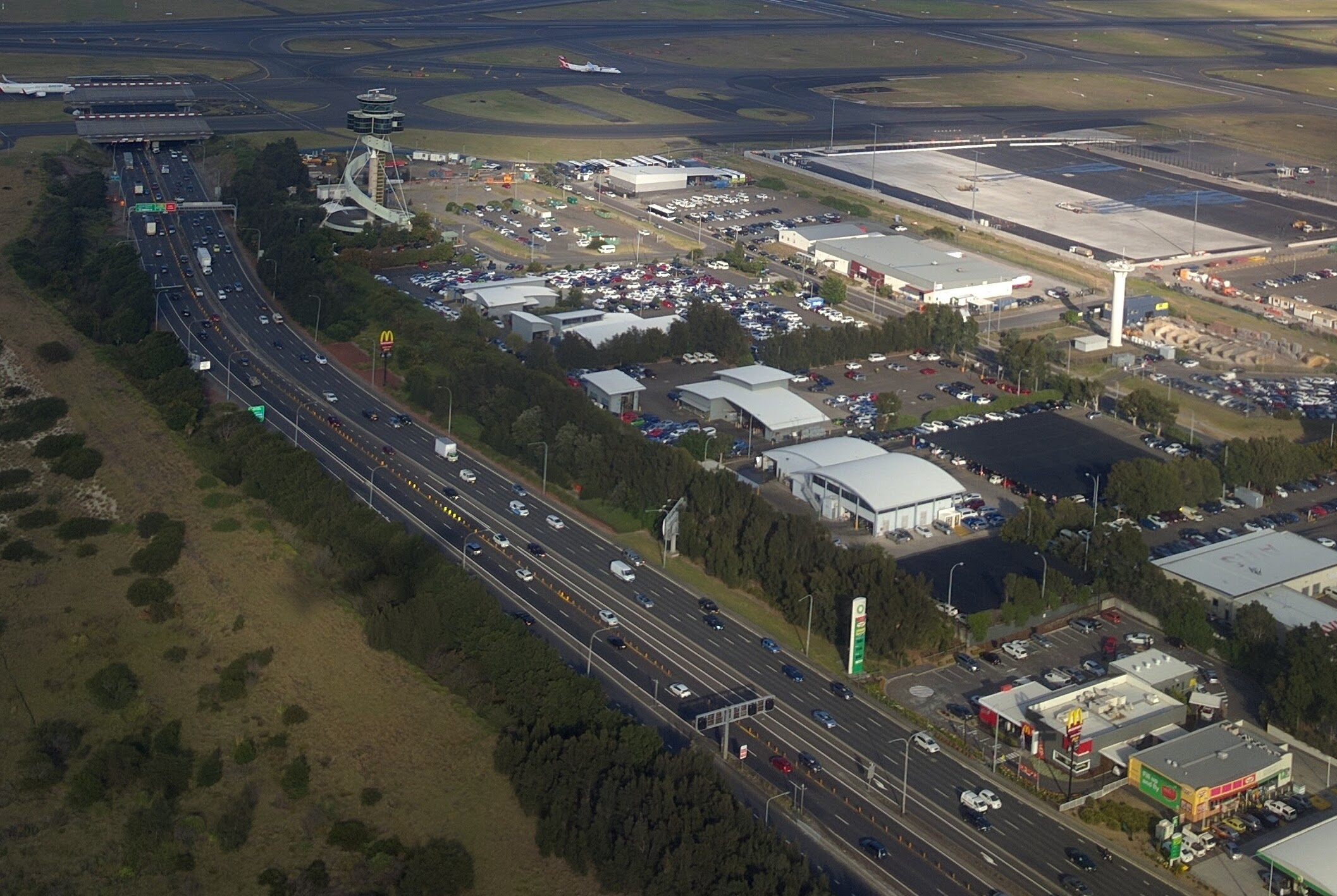
- Trade name: Sydney Airport Limited (ABN 18 165 056 360)
- Type: Private company
- Traded as: (ABN 62 082 578 809)
- Industry: International airport; Domestic airport
- Founded: 28 May 1998; 28 years ago
- Headquarters: The Nigel Love Building, 10 Arrivals Court, Sydney International Airport, Mascot, New South Wales, Australia
- Services: Aviation services
- Owner: Sydney Aviation Alliance Holdings Pty Ltd (SAAHPL)
- Subsidiaries: Sydney Airport Finance Company Pty Limited (ABN 31 110 565 261)

Sydney Airport Corporation Limited (SACL) was formed by the Australian Federal Government as the corporate entity and sole leaseholder for Sydney (Kingsford Smith) Airport. It owns the airport operator for Sydney (Kingsford Smith) Airport, Sydney Airport Limited.

Whilst the airports are privately controlled under this agreement, the Australian Government still retains responsibility for other airport-related services through agencies such as Airservices Australia (air traffic control, aviation communications/navigation-aids, airport fire-fighting and rescue), the Australian Border Force, the Department of Agriculture, Fisheries and Forestry, the Australian Federal Police and the Department of Infrastructure, Transport, Regional Development, Communications, Sport and the Arts.

== History ==
Sydney Airport Corporation Limited (SACL) was incorporated on 28 May 1998 and commenced operations on 1 July 1998 as the long-term lessee of Sydney Airports from the Australian Federal Government under the Airports Act 1996. At the point of incorporation, it owned the leases for all the airports in the Sydney region – Sydney Airport, Bankstown, Hoxton Park and Camden – as a Government Business Enterprise.

On 13 December 2000, the Australian Government announced its intention to privatise the Sydney basin airports, with Sydney (Kingsford Smith) Airport to be sold separately followed by the remaining three airports (Bankstown, Camden and Hoxton Park). After conducting a scoping study, the Government announced it had decided SACL would be broken up and privatised as two separate and competing companies: one company would operate Sydney (Kingsford Smith) Airport; and Bankstown, Camden and Hoxton Park Airports would be operated as separate companies jointly managed under another company. The decision to sell Sydney (Kingsford Smith) Airport by a 100 per cent trade sale was made on 29 March 2001 and the Australian Government entered into an arrangement for Macquarie Bank to lease and operate the airport as Sydney Airport Holdings for a period of 99 years via its ownership of SACL.

== Ownership ==
The owner of SACL with 100% interest was Sydney Airport Holdings until its acquisition in 2022 by Sydney Aviation Alliance Holdings Pty Ltd (SAAHPL) which comprises the following parties:

SACL Ownership
Owner	Stake
IFM Australian Infrastructure Fund	14.99%
IFM Global Infrastructure Fund	18%
AustralianSuper Pty Ltd	7.5%
QSuper	7.5%
Global Infrastructure Partners	37%
UniSuper	15.01%

== Sydney Airport Holdings ==
Southern Cross Airports Corporation Holdings Limited (SCACH)
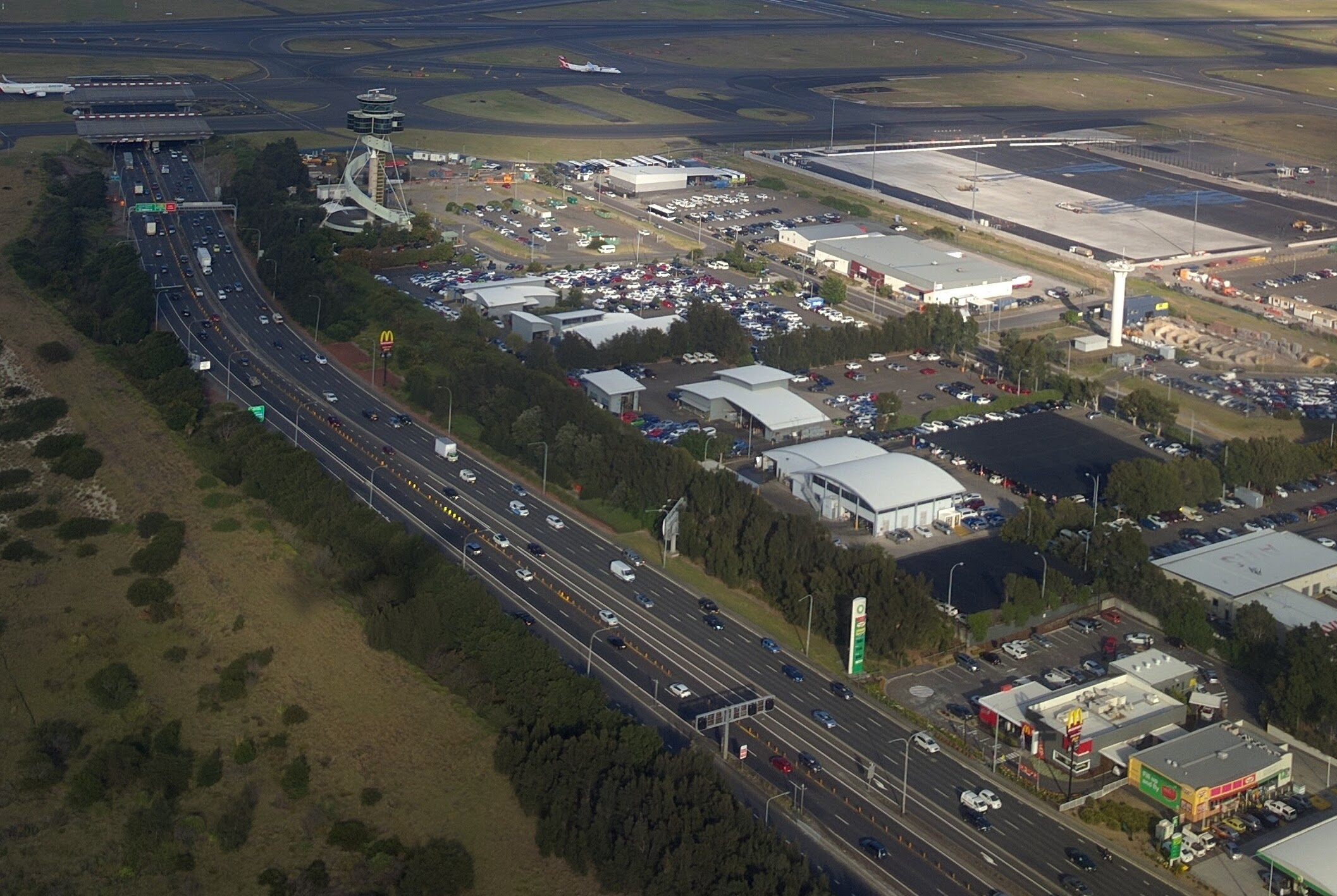
- Formerly: Sydney Airport Holdings ASX: SYD; Macquarie Airports ASX: MAP
- Type: Holding company
- Traded as: ABN 098 082 029
- Industry: International airport; Domestic airport
- Founded: 7 June 2002; 24 years ago
- Defunct: 9 March 2022
- Fate: Acquired
- Headquarters: The Nigel Love Building, 10 Arrivals Court, Sydney International Airport, Mascot, New South Wales, Australia
- Key people: Trevor Gerber (Chairman); Geoff Culbert (CEO)
- Services: Aviation services
- Revenue: A$1.057 billion (2013)
- Net income: A$75 million (2013)
- Owner: Sydney Aviation Alliance Holdings Pty Ltd (SAAHPL)
- Website: www.sydneyairport.com.au

Sydney Airport Holdings (ASX: SYD) was a publicly listed Australian holding company which owned a 100% interest in Kingsford Smith Airport via leaseholder Sydney Airport Corporation. Its head office is located in Mascot, New South Wales and it operates three passenger and seven cargo terminals in Sydney, and supplies a range of aeronautical services and facilities to airlines, retailers and other users. It was delisted in March 2022 from the Australian Stock Exchange when acquired by Sydney Aviation Alliance (SAA).

=== History ===
In 1989, Qantas bought a 30-year lease on the domestic terminal of Sydney Airport, but sold it back to the Airport's operator in August 2015 for US$395 million.

In 2002, Macquarie Bank won the bid for a 99-year lease on the airport for A$5.6 billion through consortium Southern Cross Airports Corporation Holdings Limited which it funded through the IPO of managed airport fund – Macquarie Airports (MAP) ASX: MAP – under a combination of trusts managed by Macquarie Bank until it was spun off in 2009 to form MAp Airports (MAp). MAp owned shareholdings in Brussels and Copenhagen Airports, and an 84.8% stake in Sydney Airport.

In 2011, MAp Airports traded its stakes in the Brussels and Copenhagen airports to the Ontario Teachers' Pension Plan in exchange for the OTPP's 11% stake in Sydney airport. In December 2011, MAp Airports renamed itself Sydney Airport Holdings. The company retained a 1% stake in Bristol Airport until 2013.

In 2013, Sydney Airport Holdings took a 100% stake in Sydney Airport by issuing securities to, or buying out, minority owners of the airport, which included various superannuation funds.

In August 2013, it was revealed that, since the airport had been acquired by the Macquarie Bank in 2002, it didn't pay corporate taxes, even though all other airports in the country did. In November 2013, the Macquarie Bank sold its shares of the airport back to its own shareholders, cashing $377 million in the process.

In November 2021, the company announced that it had agreed to accept a A$23.6 billion takeover bid from the Sydney Aviation Alliance (SAA), a consortium comprising IFM Investors, QSuper and Global Infrastructure Partners, advised by Macquarie Capital. In December 2021, the Australian Competition & Consumer Commission approved the deal. The acquisition was completed in March 2022.

=== Management ===
The company's inaugural CEO was Max Moore-Wilton AC, serving from 2002 until April 2006; when Moore-Wilton resigned as CEO to become Chairman of Sydney Airport Holdings. He was succeeded as CEO by former Australian Broadcasting Corporation managing director, Russell Balding. In 2011, Kerrie Mather, a senior executive with MAp – a trust spun out of the Macquarie Group, succeeded Balding as CEO.
