= Terry Moran (Australian civil servant) =

Terry Moran AC

Secretary of the Department of the Prime Minister and Cabinet
- In office 3 March 2008 – 4 September 2011
- Preceded by: Peter Shergold
- Succeeded by: Ian Watt

Personal details
- Born: Terence Francis Moran; 19 October 1947 (age 79) Melbourne, Victoria
- Education: La Trobe University
- Occupation: Public servant

Terence Francis "Terry" Moran AC (born 19 October 1947 in Melbourne, Victoria) was, as Secretary of the Department of the Prime Minister and Cabinet, the most senior official in the Australian Public Service from March 2008 to September 2011.

== Background ==
Moran was educated at Parade College and received a BA (Hons) from La Trobe University.

He spent his early career as a bureaucrat in the Australian (Commonwealth) and Victorian Public Services. Moran's first position as a public sector CEO was as Chief Executive of the Office of the State Training Board in Victoria from late 1987 until May 1993. In May 1993 he was appointed as the first chief executive officer of the Australian National Training Authority in Brisbane. In August 1998 he became Queensland's Director-General of Education.

Moran was appointed Secretary of the Department of Premier and Cabinet for the State of Victoria in July 2000 and held this position until his appointment as Secretary of the Department of the Prime Minister and Cabinet.

== Secretary of the Department of the Prime Minister and Cabinet ==
Moran was the Secretary of the Department of the Prime Minister and Cabinet from March 2008 to September 2011, the most senior position in the Australian Public Service. He was appointed by former Prime Minister Kevin Rudd, and continued in the position under Rudd's successor Prime Minister Julia Gillard.

== Honours ==
In 2006, Moran was appointed as an Officer of the Order of Australia (AO). In 2012, Moran was invested as a Companion of the Order of Australia (AC).

Government offices
Preceded by Peter Shergold	Secretary of the Department of the Prime Minister and Cabinet; 2008–2011	Succeeded by Ian Watt
