= Kathryn Campbell =

Australian public servant

Major General Kathryn Campbell AO, CSC & Bar
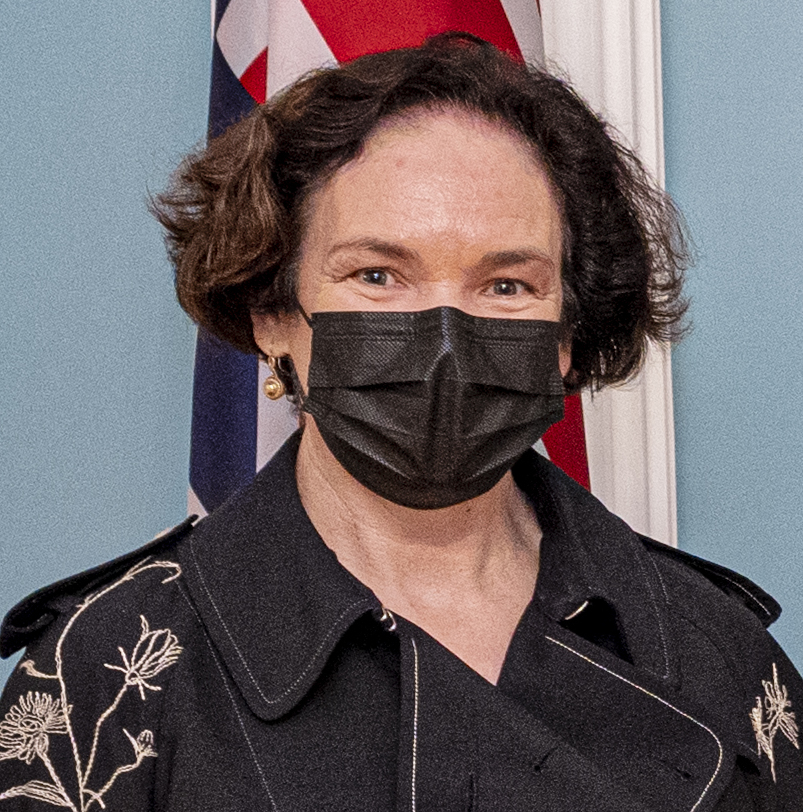
- Campbell in 2021

Secretary of the Department of Foreign Affairs and Trade
- In office 22 July 2021 – 1 July 2022
- Preceded by: Frances Adamson
- Succeeded by: Jan Adams

Secretary of the Department of Social Services
- In office 18 September 2017 – 21 July 2021
- Preceded by: Finn Pratt
- Succeeded by: Ray Griggs

Secretary of the Department of Human Services
- In office 7 March 2011 – 17 September 2017
- Preceded by: Finn Pratt
- Succeeded by: Renée Leon

Personal details
- Education: University of Southern Queensland, University of New South Wales
- Occupation: Public servant
- Civilian awards: Officer of the Order of Australia

Military service
- Allegiance: Australia
- Branch/service: Australian Army Reserve
- Years of service: 1989–2021
- Rank: Major General
- Commands: 2nd Division (2018–21); 5th Brigade (2014–16); Sydney University Regiment (2007–09)
- Battles/wars: Operation Okra
- Military awards: Conspicuous Service Cross and Bar

Kathryn Jane Campbell, AO, CSC is a former Australian public servant and a former senior officer in the Australian Army Reserve.

Campbell was the Secretary of the Department of Human Services from March 2011 to September 2017. She played a key role in the illegal debt recovery scheme known as Robodebt. At two Senate committee inquiries, Campbell controversially shifted the blame of Robodebt to the victims, and refused to accept people had died by suicide after receiving illegal Robodebt notices. The 2023 Royal Commission into the Robodebt Scheme was "scathing" of Campbell, finding she had intentionally misled cabinet about the scheme, and took steps to prevent the unlawfulness of Robodebt being uncovered, and in 2024, the Australian Public Service Commission found Campbell's actions had breached their Code of Conduct twelve times. In 2026, the National Anti-Corruption Commission disagreed with some findings of the Royal Commission, stating there was a "reasonable possibility" Campbell's failure to detect issues with Robodebt was not deliberate, and insufficient evidence that she had given instructions to stop obtaining legal advice regarding the scheme.

Campbell moved onto the Secretary of the Department of Social Services from September 2017 to July 2021. She became Secretary of the Department of Foreign Affairs and Trade (DFAT) from July 2021 to July 2022. In July 2022, she was removed as Secretary of DFAT, and was appointed to the defence portfolio as an advisor to the AUKUS program, while retaining the remuneration of her previous role. In July 2023, Campbell was suspended without pay from the Australian Public Service, following the findings against her at the Royal Commission. She resigned later that month.

== Career ==
Campbell managed government divisions in social welfare from 2002 until 2004, and finance responsible for budget policy and coordination from 2004 until 2005. Between 2005 and 2010, Campbell was Deputy Secretary of the Budget and Financial Management Groups in the Department of Finance and Deregulation, and from 2010 to 2011, she was a Deputy Secretary in the Department of Education, Employment and Workplace Relations.

Prime Minister Julia Gillard announced Campbell's appointment as Secretary of the Department of Human Services (DHS) in late December 2010, responsible for delivering the Australian Government's Centrelink, Medicare and Child Support programs, along with a number of smaller programs. Campbell commenced those duties on 7 March 2011. In September 2017, Prime Minister Malcolm Turnbull appointed Campbell as Secretary of the Department of Social Services. In 2021, Campbell left her position as an officer in the Australian Army Reserve, having enlisted in 1989.

On 9 July 2021, Prime Minister Scott Morrison announced her appointment as the Secretary of the Department of Foreign Affairs and Trade (DFAT), replacing Frances Adamson. In June 2022, new Prime Minister Anthony Albanese announced that Campbell would be replaced as Secretary of DFAT, with her term concluding on 1 July 2022. Campbell would instead be given "a senior appointment in the Defence portfolio in an AUKUS-related role", as proposed and approved by Defence Secretary Greg Moriarty. Campbell's removal as DFAT Secretary was described in the media as "being ousted in a public service shakeup". Further, the removal of Campbell was widely anticipated, especially given her performance in questioning at Senate estimates, by Senator Penny Wong, who became Minister for Foreign Affairs under the newly elected Labor government. It was also clear that Campbell's central role in the Robodebt controversy was a major concern and Labor had made an election pledge to launch a royal commission into the discredited scheme.

=== Appointment to AUKUS ===
On 31 May 2023, Senator Jacqui Lambie questioned Greg Moriarty on his appointment of Campbell to the $900,000 job as a supervisor for the AUKUS nuclear submarine project, specifically because she had been the central figure in the Robodebt scandal. Although Moriarty said that at the time he appointed Campbell there was no Royal Commission, her responsibilities for Robodebt were already well-known, as were her denials including to Senate Estimates. Lambie described Campbell's appointment as a disgrace. Campbell was suspended without pay from the role three days after the release of the Royal Commission into the Robodebt Scheme.

=== Robodebt controversy ===
Beginning in 2016, while Campbell was the Secretary of the Department of Human Services (DHS), the DHS welfare program Centrelink became embroiled in a debt recovery controversy, commonly referred to as Robodebt. Robodebt was the subject of an investigation by the Commonwealth Ombudsman, two Senate committee inquiries, the Royal Commission into the Robodebt Scheme, and an inquiry by the Australian Public Service Commission, at all of which Campbell was required to testify. The Robodebt scandal was described by The Mandarin as the "defining controversy" of Campbell's public service career, and she has been described as a "disgraced top bureaucrat" in The Canberra Times.

Appearing before the first Senate committee inquiry in March 2017, when the controversial program was still active, Campbell shifted the blame to victims of Robodebt saying "they had not engaged" with Centrelink and this was the reason for false calculations and the ongoing debt chasing for over 500,000 Australians; all of those served with debts have since had their debts removed and voided. Campbell said that refinements needed to be made, though the Robodebt system should continue." Reporting on Campbell's testimony, political commentator Jack Waterford placed considerable blame on Campbell, saying "she put pleasing ministers ahead of duty to the public, the public interest and public service values.” At the second Senate hearing in July 2020, Campbell controversially denied that people had died by suicide as a result of receiving the unlawful automated debt recovery notices, refusing to accept that suicides attributed to the scheme were in fact caused by it. The mother of one man who died by suicide after receiving a Robodebt notice responded by saying "I wanted five minutes with [Campbell] for her to tell me how she knows my son better than I did." The Royal Commission later confirmed that people had died by suicide as a result of Robodebt.

Testifying at the Royal Commission in late 2022, Campbell admitted to having a "lack of curiosity" over advice related to the legality of the scheme, and acknowledged Robodebt was a significant failure of public administration, though refused to consider it as a "massive" failure. In her third and final testimony, Campbell admitted it was her Department's "significant oversight" that led to cabinet being misled, though denied it was deliberate. Timothy Ffrench, who was chief counsel at DHS, testified that Campbell was largely to blame for a culture that meant the Robodebt scheme’s legality was not checked earlier.

Renee Leon, who took over Campbell's role at DHS in September 2017, told the Royal Commission of deep cultural problems at senior levels at the department under Campbell. She testified that staff had been very fearful of Campbell and "the reward and punishment culture" that she promoted, as well as her practices of aggression and public shaming. Leon told the inquiry she once had a "collegiate" relationship with Campbell, though became aware that Campbell was deliberately undermining her with Stuart Robert, the then responsible Minister. Leon testified that her predecessor “took credit” for the Robodebt scheme, and that Campbell was “rewarded” for being more responsive to the coalition government’s policy agenda than other department secretaries, and that she, and many others, believed that Campbell’s elevation to the role of the secretary of the Department of Foreign Affairs and Trade "was a very big reward for someone who had no background in diplomacy."

The findings of the Royal Commission were "scathing" and "damning" of Campbell. It noted her policy proposal for the scheme mentioned nothing about the income averaging method it relied on, nor the fact legislative amendments would be required to allow this, despite the fact Campbell was aware of both, concluding that Campbell intentionally misled cabinet with the proposal. It also found her choice to not continue correspondence regarding legal advice surrounding the scheme was "motivated by a concern that the unlawfulness of the Scheme might be exposed to the Ombudsman in the course of its investigation", and that she had also made false statements regarding Robodebt to the public. The Royal Commission reported that Campbell was "responsible for a department that had established, implemented and maintained an unlawful program" and was the central public figure in the scheme. Further, it reported that Campbell "did nothing of substance" when exposed to information that brought to light the illegality of income averaging, and "failed to act" when presented with opportunities to obtain legal advice. The Royal Commissioner Catherine Holmes concluded by stating that the people behind robodebt caused extraordinary harm “through venality, incompetence and cowardice”.

The Royal Commission released their report on 7 July 2023. Three days later, Campbell was involuntarily suspended without pay from the Australian Public Service. Campbell resigned from her role at the Department of Defence later that month. Following Campbell’s resignation, the Community and Public Sector Union (CPSU) issued a statement, saying her suspension and resignation was welcomed by CPSU members, and describing Campbell as a "fervent advocate of a scheme that devastated the lives of hundreds of thousands of people across this country."

In 2024, an inquiry into Robodebt by the Australian Public Service Commission found Campbell's actions had breached the APS Code of Conduct twelve times, and six overarching allegations were recorded. Campbell was reported to the inquiry for failures "to ensure internal and external legal advice about robodebt, failing to respond to public criticism and whistleblower complaints, ignoring legal issues raised publicly by the Australian Institute of Administrative Law, creating a culture where ‘aggressive and abusive behaviour’ by a deputy secretary went unaddressed, and causing the resumption of income averaging when she knew that method to raise debts was potentially inaccurate." Campbell claims she was "scapegoated" and was innocent. Bill Shorten responded by saying "Ms Campbell, you are not a scapegoat; you were involved in Robodebt". Following the public release of the report, the CPSU called for Campbell’s Officer of the Order of Australia to be revoked, stating: "Kathryn Campbell is not someone who is deserving of honours or accolades of any kind. She deserves consequences."

In 2025, the National Anti-Corruption Commission (NACC) investigated six individuals referred to it by the Royal Commission, and published their findings in March 2026. While two of the six people investigated were found to have engaged in corruption, Campbell and others were cleared of such allegations. The NACC disagreed with some of the Royal Commissions findings, concluding that there was a "reasonable possibility" Campbell's failure to detect issues with Robodebt was not deliberate, and also concluded there was insufficient evidence to support the Royal Commission's finding that Campbell had instructed public servants to cease obtaining external legal advice on the scheme in 2017.

== Education ==
Campbell studied at the University of Southern Queensland, where she obtained a Bachelor of Applied Science (Applied Mathematics) in 1988, and a Master of Business Administration in 1998. She also holds a Master of Information Studies from the University of New South Wales. In 2008, she completed an Advanced Management Program at the Harvard Business School. Campbell is a fellow of CPA Australia and a graduate member of the Australian Institute of Company Directors.

== Awards ==
Campbell's awards include:

- University of Southern Queensland 2011 Alumnus of the Year.
- Conspicuous Service Cross (CSC) in June 2010 for outstanding achievement as the Commanding Officer of the Sydney University Regiment.
- Appointed an Officer of the Order of Australia in the 2019 Australia Day Honours in recognition of her "distinguished service to public administration through senior roles with government departments, and to the Australian Army Reserve".
- Awarded a Bar to her CSC in the 2022 Australia Day Honours for "outstanding achievement as the Commander of the 2nd Division".

Government offices
Preceded by Finn Pratt	Secretary of the Department of Human Services; 2011–2017	Succeeded by Renée Leon
Preceded by Finn Pratt	Secretary of the Department of Social Services; 2017–2021	Succeeded by Ray Griggs
Preceded by Frances Adamson	Secretary of the Department of Foreign Affairs and Trade; 2021–2022	Succeeded by Jan Adams
Military offices
Preceded by Major General Stephen Porter	Commander 2nd Division; 2018–2021	Succeeded by Major General David Thomae
