= Renée Leon =

Australian public servant and academic administrator

Renée Leon PSM

Vice-Chancellor of Charles Sturt University
- Incumbent
- Assumed office 1 September 2021
- Preceded by: John Germov

Secretary of the Department of Employment
- In office 18 September 2013 – 17 September 2017
- Preceded by: Lisa Paul
- Succeeded by: Kerri Hartland

Secretary of the Department of Human Services
- In office 18 September 2017 – 16 March 2020
- Preceded by: Kathryn Campbell

Personal details
- Born: Renée Elmina Leon
- Education: Australian National University; University of Cambridge
- Occupation: Public servant
- Salary: $893,547 in 2024

Renée Elmina Leon PSM is a former senior Australian public servant. From 18 September 2017 until February 2020, she had been Secretary of the Department of Human Services, which is now known as Services Australia. In August 2021, she became Vice Chancellor of Charles Sturt University. In September 2024, Leon was found to have breached the Public Service Act 1999 13 times for misrepresenting legal advice, failing to brief the Solicitor-General, and delaying advice to the Minister about the unlawful use of income averaging under the Robodebt scheme.

== Life and career ==
Leon graduated from the Australian National University with a double degree of Bachelor of Arts and Bachelor of Laws with First Class Honours. In 1995, she was awarded the Sir Robert Menzies Memorial Scholarship in Law, leading to a Masters in Law from Cambridge University.

From 2006 to 2009, Leon held the position of Chief Executive of the ACT Department of Justice and Community Safety. She served as Deputy Secretary in the Attorney-General's Department and in the Department of the Prime Minister and Cabinet from May 2009 to September 2013. She was awarded a Public Service Medal in June 2013 for outstanding public service to public administration and law in leadership roles in the Australian Capital Territory and the Commonwealth.

She has served on the Boards of the Australian Institute of Criminology, the National Australia Day Council, and the Australia New Zealand Policing Advisory Agency, and was a member of the Council of the Order of Australia.

In September 2013, Leon was appointed Secretary of the newly established Department of Employment. She was fired from her role as the Secretary of the Department of Human Services on February 1, 2020, one of five departmental secretaries let go by the Morrison Government amidst a machinery of government change that commentators described as a "massive Australian Public Service shake-up". In mid 2021 she was appointed to chair the ACT Sexual Assault Prevention and Response Steering Committee.

On August 24, 2021, her appointment as Vice Chancellor of Charles Sturt University was announced in an email to staff by the University Council.

== Controversies ==
=== Involvement in the Robodebt Scheme ===
Upon her appointment to the role of Secretary of the Department of Human Services in September 2017, Leon assumed responsibility for the unlawful Robodebt Scheme. Her actions in that role came under scrutiny during the Royal Commission into the Robodebt Scheme.

The royal commission report notes that she was not involved in the development and implementation of the scheme, and that she initially relied on advice that there were no legal issues with the scheme. However, the Commission found that Leon had provided misleading advice to the Commonwealth Ombudsman by falsely claiming that there was "no doubt" that the scheme was lawful, a claim which the commission said “had no proper basis”. While the Royal Commission noted that Leon was “the first to take steps” to end the scheme in 2019, it qualified this by noting that there is "no reason to suppose, however, that had Ms Leon not taken the step she did, the Government’s announcement of the cessation of the practice would have been far behind."

In September 2024, the Australian Public Service Commission published its findings that Leon had breached the Public Service Act 1999 13 times. These breaches related to four main incidents:

1. In March 2019, she misrepresented to the Ombudsman that the Department’s legal stance on using income averaging under the Scheme was not uncertain in a successful effort to pressure him into censoring a report which might embarrass the government.
2. She did not correct or clarify the Department’s legal stance on income averaging under the Scheme to the Ombudsman in March 2019, despite receiving additional legal advice.
3. In mid-2019, she did not ensure that the Solicitor-General was promptly briefed or that advice was sought on the Scheme's legality.
4. She did not promptly inform the Minister and relevant Secretary of the Solicitor-General’s advice regarding the legality of the Scheme or stop the use of income averaging under the Scheme.

In response to the APSC's findings, Leon released a statement asserting that she "acted with integrity and in accordance with the standards of the public service". Rick Morton, author of a book about the Robodebt Scheme, compared her statement to the findings of the Royal Commission, concluding that it was "deliberate misinformation".

=== Budget cuts at Charles Sturt University ===
In 2025, as vice-chancellor of Charles Sturt University (CSU), Renée Leon announced that the university must cut $35 million from its operating budget by 2027 — a move she described as “distressing but unsurprising” — attributing the reductions primarily to a dramatic drop in international student enrolments and what she called unfair government funding policies that especially disadvantage regional universities like CSU.

Government offices
Preceded by Lisa Paul as Secretary of the Department of Education, Employment and Workplace Relations	Secretary of the Department of Employment; 2013–2017	Succeeded by Kerri Hartland
Preceded by Kathryn Campbell	Secretary of the Department of Human Services; 2017–2020	Succeeded by Amanda Cattermole
