= Centrepay =

Centrelink bill paying service

Centrepay is an Australian government service run by Services Australia that allows recipients of Centrelink welfare payments to pay for bills and other expenses through regular, automatic deductions from their welfare payments. The service was first launched in 1998 and is used by over 600,000 customers and 15,000 businesses, processing transactions worth a total of $2.7 billion in 2023. Centrepay is primarily used as a payment method for recurring expenses like rent and utilities, but can also be used to pay for goods like clothing and appliances.

The scheme has been criticised for placing vulnerable welfare recipients, particularly Indigenous Australians living in remote communities, at risk of financial stress. A 2012 independent review of the scheme and a 2023-24 investigation by The Guardian uncovered evidence that the Centrepay system was being widely misused. In 2024, Minister for Government Services Bill Shorten announced that the Albanese government would undertake major reforms to the scheme to address "predatory behaviour".

== History and operation ==
Centrepay was first established in 1998. The scheme allows welfare recipients to authorise automatic deductions from their welfare payments to pay for various goods and services, including accommodation, utilities, transport and education. The goal of the scheme was to help welfare recipients at risk of financial hardship to maintain financial stability and pay for essentials like rent and electricity by automatically deducting money from their welfare payments. In a 1999 media release, Minister for Community Services Warren Truss said that the scheme would "give Centrelink customers greater choice to help them manage their finances and avoid debt situations".

Concerns began to be raised in the early 2010s regarding exploitative and predatory practices facilitated by the Centrepay system. Anna Buduls conducted an independent review of the scheme for the Gillard government in 2012 but has alleged that her report was "buried" when the Coalition won government at the 2013 election. Buduls found that the scheme featured “exploitation of financially vulnerable people by some unscrupulous operators” and recommended a significant overhaul. Her recommendations included an increased focus on compliance, a code of conduct for businesses accepting payments through Centrepay, a complaints phone line, and an approval process for businesses wishing to accept Centrepay payments. A 2015 report by the Australian Securities and Investments Commission raised the alarm about Centrepay being used to overcharge consumers for household goods like appliances, finding that there was substantial price discrimination and that Centrelink recipients were being charged significantly more than other customers for leases on household goods. In a 2022-23 financial year audit, Services Australia found that 42% of government-approved businesses taking payments through Centrepay were non-compliant.

As of 2024, 79% of payments made through Centrepay were for accommodation and utilities. The scheme is used by more than 600,000 customers and by over 15,000 businesses. Almost a third of Centrepay users are Aboriginal Australians, predominantly Aboriginal women living in remote communities. In 2023 there were 23.7 million Centrepay transactions worth a total of $2.7 billion.

In December 2024, the Australian government announced that it would be making reforms to Centrepay to better protect customers. These reforms included removing high-risk goods and services, such as consumer leases and household goods, from the scheme and imposing mandatory end dates and target amounts for most deductions. The reforms also included a stronger compliance framework, including an application process for businesses wishing to accept payments through Centrepay and an improved complaints system.

== Controversies ==
=== Clothing and household goods retailers ===
Many clothing and appliance retailers, particularly those in outback Australia, allow customers to pay for their purchases through credit arrangements through Centrepay. Residents in remote communities often enter into credit arrangements to pay for appliances, clothing and other household goods through rent-to-buy schemes. There is no limit on the number of Centrepay agreements that a customer can enter into or on the amount of their welfare payment that can be deducted through Centrepay, meaning that customers may enter into multiple Centrepay agreements with a variety of rent-to-buy operators to pay for items like clothing, televisions, and other household goods. Welfare recipients, some of whom have low levels of financial literacy, may then be left with insufficient funds to pay for essential expenses like housing and food after Centrepay deductions are made from their welfare payments.

The Australian government has banned a number of clothing and household goods stores in remote communities, including Indy-C and Urban Rampage, from accepting payments through Centrepay due to these concerns. ASIC alleged in 2024 that Indy-C entered into credit arrangements with Aboriginal Australians to buy clothing and appliances "without considering whether the credit arrangement would be consistent with the consumer’s objectives, financial situation, and needs". Urban Rampage was banned from the scheme in 2024 after ASIC found that its credit arrangements placed customers at "significant risk" of financial hardship. Urban Rampage labelled the decision "racist and paternalistic" and vowed to appeal.

Appliance lease operators have been identified as one of the primary sources of exploitative practices through Centrepay. A 2015 ASIC report found that appliance rental companies were targeting Centrelink customers and charging prices up to five times greater than their ordinary retail prices. In 2023, 7:30 profiled a disability pensioner who had entered into various Centrepay agreements that eventually took up over a third of her welfare payment, including being charged $6760 for a phone that retailed for just $1800. Several appliance rental companies that took payments through Centrepay, including Amazing Rentals, Rent the Roo and The Rental Guys, were ultimately found by ASIC to have breached responsible lending rules. In 2015, Credit Suisse published a report claiming that leading appliance rental company Radio Rentals received almost half of its revenue in Australia from Centrepay customers, who were often charged inflated prices.

=== Energy retailers ===
Several energy retailers have been referred to the Australian Energy Regulator over their use of the Centrepay scheme. AGL Energy was fined $25 million by the Federal Court of Australia in December 2024 for failing to comply with its obligations around overcharging Centrepay customers. AGL overcharged 483 Centrepay customers a total of $468,310 between 2016 and 2021 after they had ceased to be its customers. The Australian Energy Regulator confirmed in September 2024 that it was considering taking action against at least three additional energy retailers for similar practices. Origin Energy and Ergon Energy had previously confirmed that they were working with Services Australia to return overpayments.

=== Youpla ===
Aboriginal Community Benefit Fund, also known as Youpla, was a funeral insurance provider for Aboriginal Australians that collapsed in 2022, leaving many low-income Aboriginal people with insufficient funds to pay for family members' funerals after paying premiums for decades. Some advocates claimed that Centrepay had "legitimised" the failed scheme, which was the only funeral insurance provider approved to take payments through Centrepay. The company received $170 million in premiums from Aboriginal people during its three decades in operation, much of this paid through Centrepay, despite a history of misleading claims and legal troubles. The fund had faced numerous ASIC court actions in the early 2000s, and Anna Buduls' 2012 independent review of Centrepay had recommended that Youpla's access to the scheme be removed. Despite this, Youpla had kept access to Centrepay until 2017. The government ultimately agreed to pay out policyholders who had been affected by Youpla's collapse during the years that it had been approved to accept payments through Centrepay.
