= Minister for Government Services =

Australian cabinet position

- Commonwealth Coat of Arms

- Flag of Australia

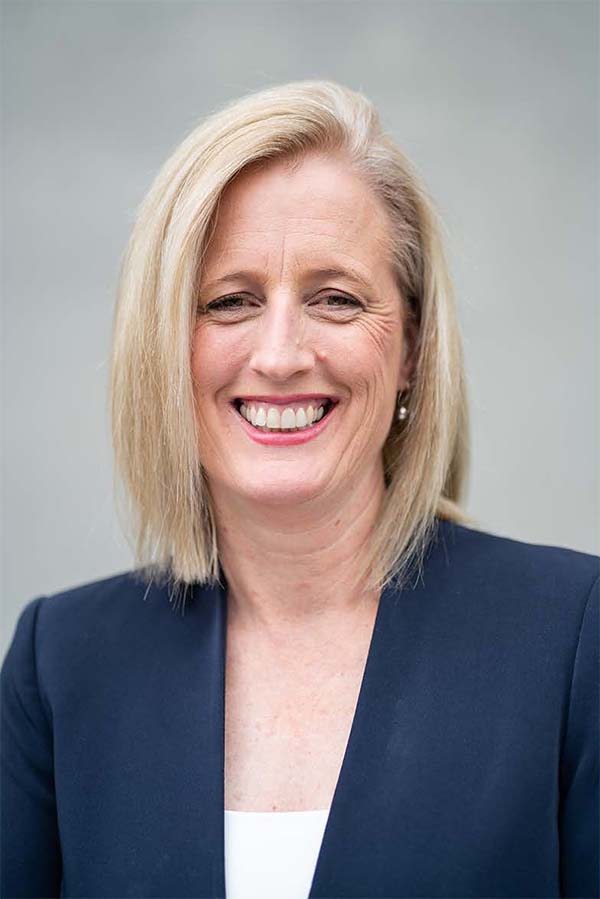
- Incumbent; Katy Gallagher since 20 January 2025
- Department of Social Services; Services Australia
- Style: The Honourable
- Appointer: Governor-General; on the advice of the prime minister
- Inaugural holder: Frederick Stewart (as Minister for Social Services)
- Formation: 26 April 1939
- Website: ministers.dss.gov.au/katy-gallagher

The Minister for Government Services is the minister in the Government of Australia responsible for Services Australia. The current minister is Senator Katy Gallagher, who has held the position since 20 January 2025 following a cabinet reshuffle prompted by the retirement of the previous minister, Bill Shorten.

The portfolio was given its current title in machinery of government changes ordered by then-Prime Minister Scott Morrison following the 2019 federal election.

== Scope ==
In the Government of Australia, the Minister is responsible for a number of welfare agencies and administers their portfolio through Services Australia and its component bodies:

- Child Support Agency
- Centrelink
- Australian Hearing
- Medicare Australia

The Department of Human Services was created on 26 October 2004, as part of the Finance Portfolio, to improve the development and delivery of Government social and health related services to the Australian people.

As a result of the Administrative Arrangements Orders (AAOs) issued on 30 January 2007, the Department of Human Services and its agencies were transferred to a newly created Human Services Portfolio.

The Minister for Government Services provides a central policy and coordination role for the delivery of services across the Portfolio as well as being the delivery agency for child support and vocational rehabilitation services. The AAOs of 25 January 2008 clarified the Department’s responsibility for the development of policy or service delivery, directed at ensuring the effective, innovative, and efficient delivery of Government services. The Department works with other departments and agencies to ensure early consideration of service delivery issues in the policy development process to improve the quality and cost effectiveness of service delivery by agencies in the Human Services Portfolio.

== List of ministers for government services ==
There was a Minister for Social Services or Social Security continuously from 1939 to 1998, when service delivery was partially privatised and residual functions were transferred to the Minister for Finance and Administration. In 2004, the position of Minister for Human Services was recreated to handle the residual functions; Scott Morrison renamed the portfolio to Government Services in 2019.

The following individuals have been appointed as Minister for Government Services, or any precedent titles:

Order	Minister	Party affiliation	Prime Minister	Ministerial title	Term start	Term end	Term in office
1	Frederick Stewart	United Australia	Menzies	Minister for Social Services	26 April 1939	29 August 1941	2 years, 164 days
1	Frederick Stewart	United Australia	Fadden	Minister for Social Services	29 August 1941	7 October 1941	2 years, 164 days
2	Jack Holloway	Labor	Curtin	Minister for Social Services	7 October 1941	21 September 1943	1 year, 349 days
3	James Fraser	Labor	Curtin	Minister for Social Services	21 September 1943	6 July 1945	2 years, 270 days
3	James Fraser	Labor	Forde	Minister for Social Services	6 July 1945	13 July 1945	2 years, 270 days
3	James Fraser	Labor	Chifley	Minister for Social Services	13 July 1945	18 June 1946	2 years, 270 days
4	Nick McKenna	Labor	Chifley	Minister for Social Services	18 June 1946	19 December 1949	3 years, 184 days
5	Bill Spooner	Liberal	Menzies	Minister for Social Services	19 December 1949	11 May 1951	1 year, 143 days
6	Athol Townley	Liberal	Menzies	Minister for Social Services	11 May 1951	9 July 1954	3 years, 59 days
7	William McMahon	Liberal	Menzies	Minister for Social Services	9 July 1954	28 February 1956	1 year, 234 days
8	Hugh Roberton	Country	Menzies	Minister for Social Services	28 February 1956	21 January 1965	8 years, 328 days
9	Reginald Swartz	Liberal	Menzies	Minister for Social Services	21 January 1965	22 February 1965	32 days
10	Ian Sinclair	Country	Menzies	Minister for Social Services	22 February 1965	26 January 1966	3 years, 6 days
10	Ian Sinclair	Country	Holt	Minister for Social Services	26 January 1966	19 December 1967	3 years, 6 days
10	Ian Sinclair	Country	McEwen	Minister for Social Services	19 December 1967	10 January 1968	3 years, 6 days
10	Ian Sinclair	Country	Gorton	Minister for Social Services	10 January 1968	28 February 1968	3 years, 6 days
11	Bill Wentworth	Liberal	Gorton	Minister for Social Services	28 February 1968	10 March 1971	4 years, 281 days
11	Bill Wentworth	Liberal	McMahon	Minister for Social Services	10 March 1971	5 December 1972	4 years, 281 days
12	Lance Barnard	Labor	Whitlam	Minister for Social Services	5 December 1972	19 December 1972	14 days
13	Bill Hayden	Labor	Whitlam	Minister for Social Security	19 December 1972	6 June 1975	2 years, 169 days
14	John Wheeldon	Labor	Whitlam	Minister for Social Security	6 June 1975	11 November 1975	158 days
15	Don Chipp	Liberal	Fraser	Minister for Social Security	12 November 1975	22 December 1975	40 days
16	Margaret Guilfoyle	Liberal	Fraser	Minister for Social Security	22 December 1975	3 November 1980	4 years, 317 days
17	Fred Chaney	Liberal	Fraser	Minister for Social Security	3 November 1980	11 March 1983	2 years, 128 days
18	Don Grimes	Labor	Hawke	Minister for Social Security	11 March 1983	13 December 1984	1 year, 277 days
19	Brian Howe	Labor	Hawke	Minister for Social Security	13 December 1984	4 April 1990	5 years, 112 days
20	Graham Richardson	Labor	Hawke	Minister for Social Security	4 April 1990	20 December 1991	1 year, 267 days
20	Graham Richardson	Labor	Keating	Minister for Social Security	20 December 1991	27 December 1991	1 year, 267 days
21	Neal Blewett	Labor	Keating	Minister for Social Security	27 December 1991	24 March 1993	1 year, 87 days
22	Peter Baldwin	Labor	Keating	Minister for Social Security	24 March 1993	11 March 1996	2 years, 353 days
23	Jocelyn Newman	Liberal	Howard	Minister for Social Security	11 March 1996	21 October 1998	2 years, 224 days
24	Joe Hockey	Liberal	Howard	Minister for Human Services	26 October 2004	30 January 2007	2 years, 96 days
25	Ian Campbell	Liberal	Howard	Minister for Human Services	30 January 2007	9 March 2007	38 days
26	Chris Ellison	Liberal	Howard	Minister for Human Services	9 March 2007	3 December 2007	269 days
27	Joe Ludwig	Labor	Rudd	Minister for Human Services	3 December 2007	9 June 2009	1 year, 188 days
28	Chris Bowen	Labor	Rudd	Minister for Human Services	9 June 2009	24 June 2010	1 year, 97 days
28	Chris Bowen	Labor	Gillard	Minister for Human Services	24 June 2010	14 September 2010	1 year, 97 days
29	Tanya Plibersek	Labor	Gillard	Minister for Human Services	14 September 2010	14 December 2011	1 year, 91 days
30	Brendan O'Connor	Labor	Gillard	Minister for Human Services	14 December 2011	5 March 2012	82 days
31	Kim Carr	Labor	Gillard	Minister for Human Services	5 March 2012	23 March 2013	1 year, 18 days
32	Jan McLucas	Labor	Gillard	Minister for Human Services	23 March 2013	27 June 2013	179 days
32	Jan McLucas	Labor	Rudd	Minister for Human Services	27 June 2013	18 September 2013	179 days
33	Marise Payne	Liberal	Abbott	Minister for Human Services	18 September 2013	15 September 2015	2 years, 3 days
33	Marise Payne	Liberal	Turnbull	Minister for Human Services	15 September 2015	21 September 2015	2 years, 3 days
34	Stuart Robert	Liberal	Turnbull	Minister for Human Services	21 September 2015	12 February 2016	144 days
35	Alan Tudge	Liberal	Turnbull	Minister for Human Services	18 February 2016	20 December 2017	1 year, 305 days
36	Michael Keenan	Liberal	Turnbull	Minister for Human Services	20 December 2017	24 August 2018	1 year, 160 days
36	Michael Keenan	Liberal	Morrison	Minister for Human Services	24 August 2018	29 May 2019	1 year, 160 days
(34)	Stuart Robert	Liberal	Morrison	Minister for Government Services	29 May 2019	30 March 2021	1 year, 305 days
37	Linda Reynolds	Liberal	Morrison	Minister for Government Services	30 March 2021	23 May 2022	1 year, 56 days
38	Bill Shorten	Labor	Albanese	Minister for Government Services	1 June 2022	20 January 2025	2 years, 233 days
39	Katy Gallagher	Labor	Albanese	Minister for Government Services	20 January 2025	Incumbent	1 year, 238 days
