= Department of Social Services (Australia) =

Australian government department, 2013-

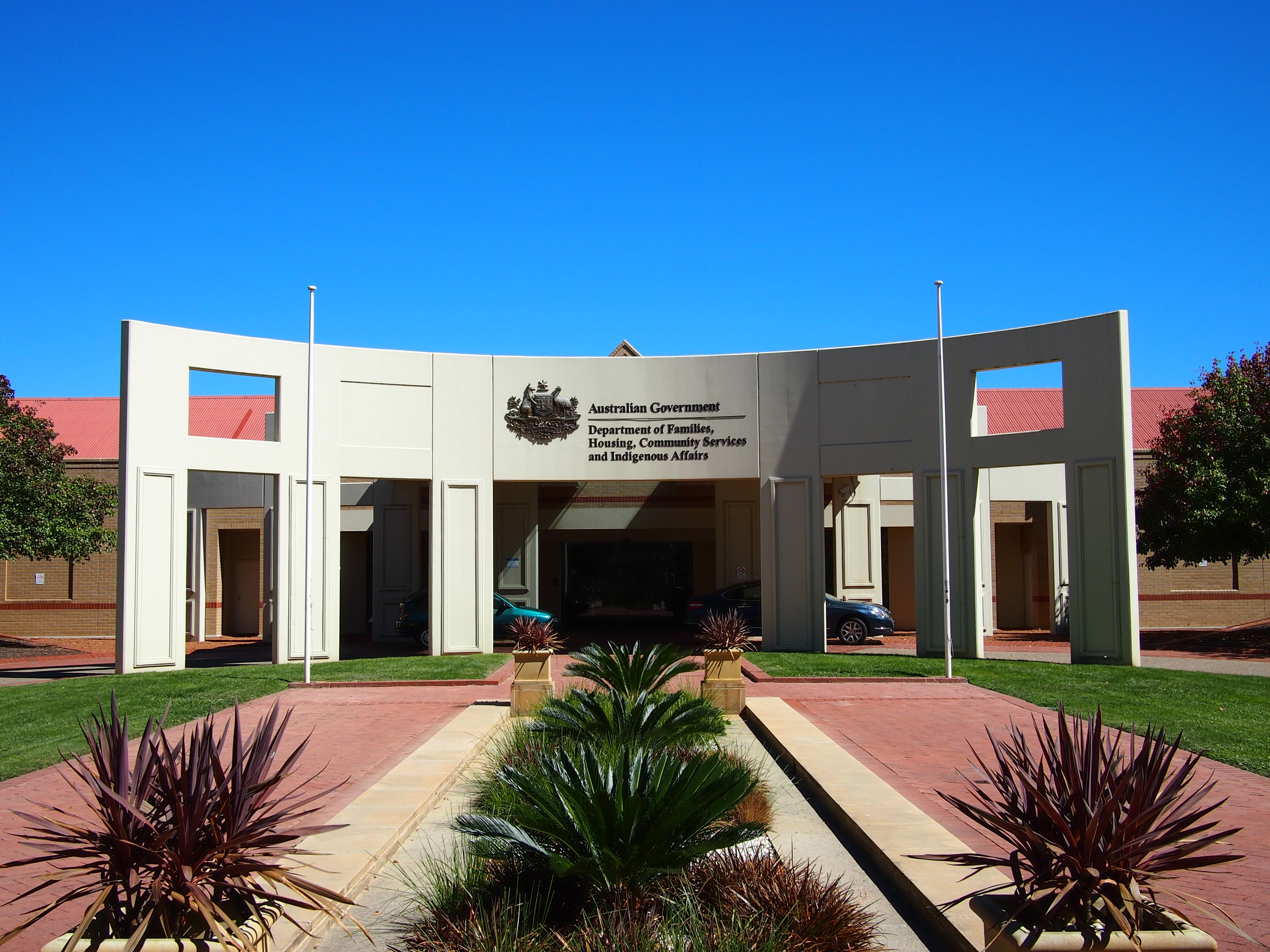
- The previous head office (until 2017) of the Department of Social Services, located in Greenway, Canberra

Department overview
- Formed: 18 September 2013
- Preceding department: Department of Families, Housing, Community Services and Indigenous Affairs
- Jurisdiction: Australian Government
- Employees: 2,305 (2017–18)
- Ministers responsible: Tanya Plibersek, Minister for Social Services; Katy Gallagher, Minister for Government Services
- Department executive: Michael Lye, Secretary
- Child agencies: Aged Care Standards and Accreditation Agency; Australian Institute of Family Studies
- Website: dss.gov.au

The Department of Social Services (DSS) is a department of the Australian Government responsible for national policies and programs related to social welfare and social security. Additionally, the department develops and implements social policy.

The head of the department is the Secretary of the Department of Social Services, currently Michael Lye, who reports to the Minister for Social Services. As of May 2025, the ministers of the department are Tanya Plibersek, Minister for Social Services, and Katy Gallagher, Minister for Government Services. They are joined by one assistant minister, Ged Kearney, who is the Assistant Minister for Social Services and Assistant Minister for the Prevention of Family Violence.

The head office of the department is located in the Australian Capital Territory suburb of Greenway.

== History ==
The department was formed by way of an Administrative Arrangements Order issued on 18 September 2013 and replaced the majority of the functions previously performed by the former Department of Families, Housing, Community Services and Indigenous Affairs (FaHCSIA); with the exception of Office of Indigenous Policy Coordination, that was transferred to the Department of the Prime Minister and Cabinet.

On 13 May 2025, the National Disability Insurance Scheme and Foundational Supports were transferred from the department to the newly renamed Department of Health, Disability and Ageing, and housing, rental and homelessness policy were transferred from the department to the Treasury.

== Operational activities ==
In an Administrative Arrangements Order made on 13 May 2025, the functions of the department were broadly classified into the following matters:

- Income security and support policies and programmes for families with children, carers, the aged, people with disabilities and people in hardship
- Income support policies for students and apprentices
- Income support and participation policy for people of working age
- Policy and services for families with children and people with disabilities
- Community support services and related workforce
- Family relationship, Family and Children's Support Services
- Family, domestic and sexual violence national policy
- Rent assistance
- Child support policy
- Services to help people with disabilities obtain employment
- Non-profit sector and volunteering
- Services and payments relating to social security, child support, students, families, aged care and health programmes (excluding Health provider compliance)
- Whole of government service delivery policy
- Co-ordination of early childhood development policy and responsibilities

== Secretary of the Department ==
The Secretary of the Department Social Services is the head of the department, also known as the secretary of the level of Senior Executive Service Band 4 in the Australian Public Service as per the Public Service Act 1999.

| Name | Postnominal(s) | Term began | Term ended | Time in Appointment |
|---|---|---|---|---|
Secretary
| Finn Pratt | AO, PSM | 18 September 2013 | 18 September 2018 | 5 years, 0 days |
| Major General Kathryn Campbell | AO, CSC | 18 September 2018 | 22 July 2021 | 2 years, 307 days |
| Vice Admiral Raymond Griggs | AO, CSC, RAN | 22 July 2021 | 10 December 2024 | 3 years, 141 days |
| Michael Lye | | 11 December 2024 | Incumbent | 1 year, 318 days |

== See also ==
- Robodebt scheme
- List of Australian Commonwealth Government entities
