= Department of the Environment (Australia, 2013–2016) =

Australian government department, 2013–2016

Department overview
- Formed: 18 September 2013
- Preceding Department: Department of Sustainability, Environment, Water, Population and Communities
- Dissolved: 19 July 2016
- Superseding Department: Department of the Environment and Energy
- Type: Department
- Jurisdiction: Commonwealth of Australia
- Headquarters: John Gorton Building, King Edward Terrace, Parkes ACT 2600, Canberra, Australia
- Motto: "to protect and conserve Australia's environment and heritage"
- Annual budget: $460 million in 2013–14
- Minister responsible: Greg Hunt, Minister for the Environment
- Department executive: Gordon de Brouwer, Secretary
- Website: www.environment.gov.au

The Australian Department of the Environment was a department of the Government of Australia that existed between September 2013 and July 2016. The department was charged with responsibility for developing and implementing national policy, programs and legislation to protect and conserve Australia's environment and heritage.

== Structure ==
The department was an Australian Public Service Department of State in the environment portfolio, under the Public Service Act 1999.

The head of the department was its Secretary, Gordon de Brouwer, responsible to the Minister for the Environment, Josh Frydenberg.

== History ==
The department was formed by way of an Administrative Arrangements Order issued on 18 September 2013. It absorbed the responsibilities of the former Department of Sustainability, Environment, Water, Population and Communities and climate change from the former Department of Industry, Innovation, Climate Change, Science, Research and Tertiary Education.

The department was dissolved in July 2016 and its functions, along with energy policy functions, were moved to the newly established Department of the Environment and Energy.

From when it was established in September 2013 to when it was dissolved in July 2016 the department faced significant cuts (25 per cent cut from the organisation's budget over four years), in line with the Coalition Government's environmental deregulation policies.

== Mission ==
The stated aims of the department were to achieve the protection and conservation of the environment; to ensure that Australia benefits from meteorological and related sciences and services; and to see that Australia's interests in Antarctica are advanced. The department developed and implemented national policy, programs and legislation to protect and conserve Australia's environment and heritage.

== Operational activities ==
The functions of the department were broadly classified into the following matters:

- The Great Barrier Reef
- Environment protection and conservation of biodiversity
- Air quality
- National fuel quality standards
- Land contamination
- Meteorology
- Administration of the Australian Antarctic Territory, and the Territory of the Heard Island and McDonald Islands
- Natural, built and cultural heritage
- Environmental information and research
- Ionospheric prediction
- Co-ordination of sustainable communities policy
- Population policy
- Urban environment
- Development and co-ordination of domestic climate change policy
- Renewable energy target policy, regulation and co-ordination
- Greenhouse emissions and energy consumption reporting
- Climate change adaptation strategy and co-ordination
- Co-ordination of climate change science activities
- Renewable energy
- Greenhouse gas abatement programs
- Community and household climate action
- Water policy and resources

=== Programs ===
The department managed a number of major programs. The most significant of those dealing with natural resource management came under the umbrella of the Natural Heritage Trust and the National Action Plan for Salinity and Water Quality. Both the Trust and National Action Plan were administered jointly with the Department of Agriculture.

=== Divisions ===
Divisions of the department included the Australian Antarctic Division, Supervising Scientist Division, Heritage Division, Parks Australia, Policy and Communications, Australian Wildlife, Sydney Harbour Federation Trust, Australian Land and Coasts plus a number of executive agencies and statutory authorities.

=== Environmental protection ===
The Department of the Environment administered environmental laws, including the Environment Protection and Biodiversity Conservation Act 1999 and a range of other Acts. It was also responsible for Australia's participation in a number of international environmental agreements.

=== Islands administration ===
The department administered areas of the Coral Sea Islands, Heard Island and the McDonald Islands, and oversees certain policy areas in Norfolk Island and Christmas Island.
