= Department of Families, Housing, Community Services and Indigenous Affairs =

Australian government department, 2007–2013

Department overview
- Formed: 3 December 2007
- Preceding Department: Department of Families, Community Services and Indigenous Affairs
- Dissolved: 18 September 2013
- Superseding Department: Department of Social Services Department of the Prime Minister and Cabinet (Indigenous affairs functions)
- Jurisdiction: Commonwealth of Australia
- Headquarters: Greenway, Canberra
- Employees: 3,324 (at April 2013)
- Department executives: Jeff Harmer, Secretary (2007–2011); Finn Pratt, Secretary (2011–2013)
- Website: fahcsia.gov.au

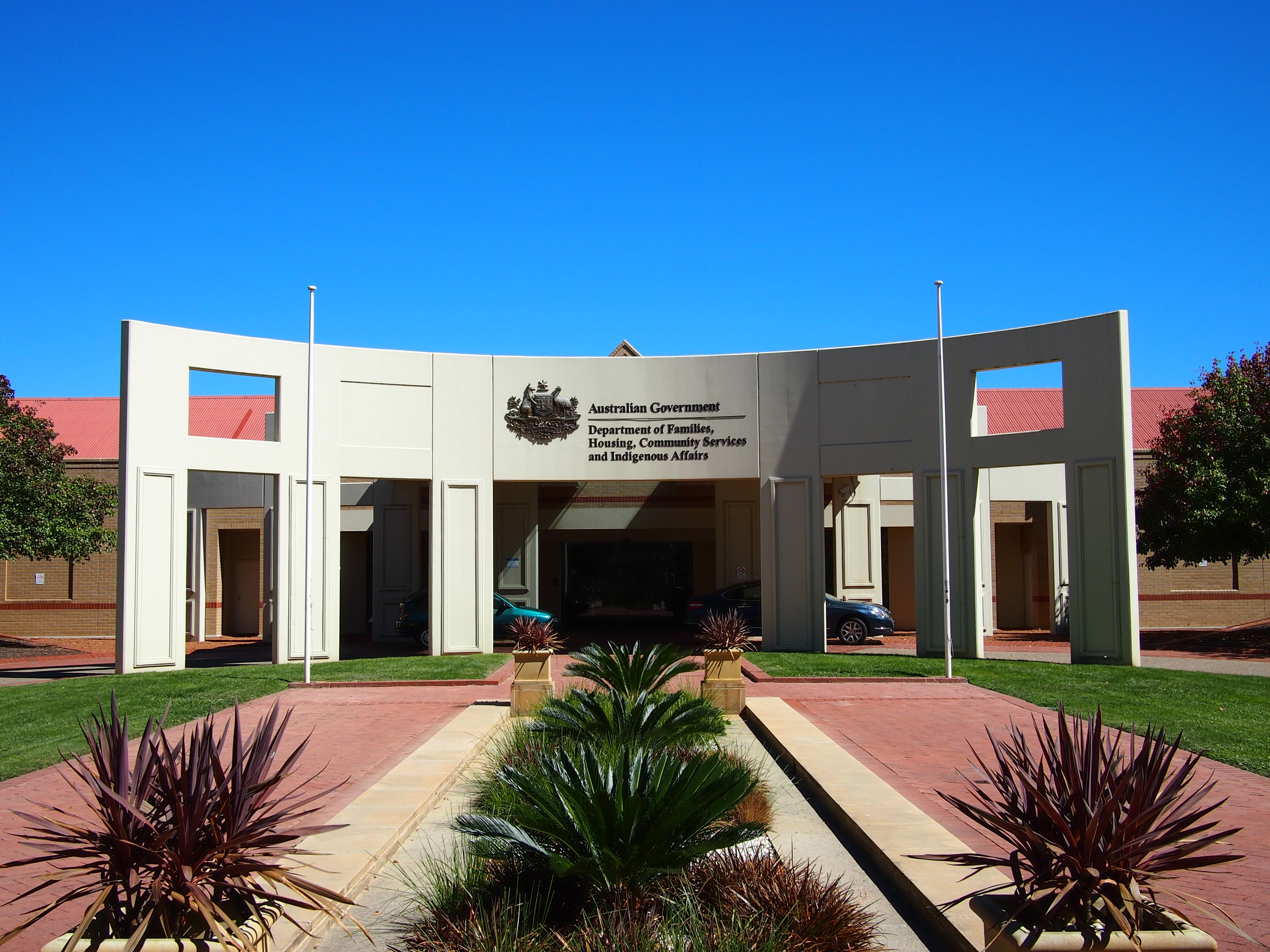
The main entrance to FaHCSIA's national headquarters

The former Australian Department of Families, Housing, Community Services and Indigenous Affairs (FaHCSIA) was a department of the Australian Government located in Greenway in Canberra. It was formed in 2007 and absorbed the former Department of Families, Community Services and Indigenous Affairs. As a result of an Administrative Arrangements Order issued on 18 September 2013, the Department of Social Services was established and assumed most of the responsibilities of FaHCSIA; with indigenous affairs functions assumed by the Department of the Prime Minister and Cabinet.

== Operational activities ==
The former department's role was to develop social policies and support affected Australian society and the living standards of Australian families. The Office of Indigenous Policy Coordination was a part of FaHCSIA. In the Administrative Arrangements Order of 3 December 2007, the functions of the department were broadly classified into the following matters:

- Income security policies and programs for families with children, carers, the aged and people in hardship
- Services for families with children, people with disabilities and carers
- Community support services, excluding the Home and Community Care program
- Family relationship services
- Housing policy co-ordination, welfare housing and rent assistance
- Women's policies and programs
- Indigenous policy co-ordination and the promotion of reconciliation
- Community development employment projects

== Administrative structure ==
Ministers and parliamentary secretaries for the former Department of Families, Housing, Community Services and Indigenous Affairs
Start date	End date	Ministerial title	Minister	Ref.
3 Dec 2007	18 Sep 2013	Minister for Families, Community Services and Indigenous Affairs; Minister for Disability Reform	Jenny Macklin	
14 Dec 2011	18 Sep 2013	Minister for Housing and Homelessness, Community Services, Indigenous Employment and Economic Development; Minister for the Status of Women	Julie Collins	
25 Mar 2013	18 Sep 2013	Parliamentary Secretary for Disabilities and Carers	Amanda Rishworth	
1 Jul 2013	18 Sep 2013	Parliamentary Secretary for Housing and Homelessness	Doug Cameron	
4 Feb 2013	1 Jul 2013	Minister for Housing and Homelessness	Mark Butler	
4 Feb 2013	1 Jul 2013	Parliamentary Secretary for Homelessness and Social Housing	Melissa Parke	
14 Sep 2010	25 Mar 2013	Parliamentary Secretary for Disabilities and Carers	Jan McLucas	
5 Mar 2012	Feb 2013	Minister for Housing and Homelessness	Brendan O'Connor	
14 Dec 2011	5 Mar 2012	Minister for Housing and Homelessness	Robert McClelland	
14 Sep 2010	Nov 2011	Minister for Indigenous Employment and Economic Development; Minister for Social Housing and Homelessness	Mark Arbib	
14 Sep 2010	Nov 2011	Minister for the Status of Women	Kate Ellis	
3 Dec 2007	14 Sep 2010	Minister for Housing; Minister for Status of Women	Tanya Plibersek	
3 Dec 2007	14 Sep 2010	Parliamentary Secretary for Disabilities and Children's Services; Parliamentary Secretary for Victorian Bushfire Reconstruction	Bill Shorten	
3 Dec 2007	14 Sep 2010	Parliamentary Secretary for Social Inclusion and the Voluntary Sector	Ursula Stephens	

The Secretaries of the department were:

- Dr Jeff Harmer (3 December 2007 to April 2011). Harmer had been appointed Secretary of the previous Department of Families and Community Services in October 2004.
- Mr Finn Pratt (April 2011 to 18 September 2013).

== See also ==
- Services Australia
