= Royal Commission into the Robodebt Scheme =

Australian Royal Commission

- Commissioner: The Hon. Catherine Holmes AC SC
- Inquiry period: 18 August 2022 – 7 July 2023
- Constituting instrument: Royal Commissions Act 1902 (Cth)
- Website: robodebt.royalcommission.gov.au

The Royal Commission into the Robodebt Scheme was a royal commission established on 18 August 2022 by the Australian Government pursuant to the Royal Commissions Act 1902. The Royal Commissioner, Catherine Holmes, released her report on 7 July 2023.

== Background ==
In June 2020, the Greens and Labor called for a royal commission into Robodebt, to 'determine those responsible for the scheme, and its impact on Australians'. These calls have been reiterated by university academics, and by the Australian Council of Social Service (ACOSS), which stated that "although some restitution has been delivered to victims of Robodebt, they have not received justice".

In May 2022, the final report from the second Senate inquiry into the Robodebt scheme recommended a royal commission, "to completely understand how the failures of the Income Compliance Program came to pass, and why they were allowed to continue for so long despite the dire impacts on people issued with debts".

In June 2020 Labor had stated that only a royal commission would be able to obtain the truth about Robodebt. Labor subsequently budgeted A$30 million in its election costings for the 2022 election for a royal commission into the Robodebt scheme. ACOSS chief executive Cassandra Goldie welcomed this saying "The Robodebt affair was not just a maladministration scandal, it was a human tragedy that resulted in people taking their lives".

Following Labor's election win, Prime Minister Anthony Albanese announced the Royal Commission into the Robodebt Scheme, with letters patent issued by Governor-General David Hurley on 25 August 2022. The letters patent appointed former Queensland Supreme Court Justice Catherine Holmes as Royal Commissioner.

=== Terms of reference ===
The terms of reference outlined in the letters patent require the commissioner to examine:

- The establishment, design and implementation of the Robodebt scheme
- The use of third party debt collectors under the Robodebt scheme
- Concerns raised following the implementation of the Robodebt scheme
- The intended or actual outcomes of the Robodebt scheme

=== Powers ===
The powers of Royal Commissions in Australia are set out in the enabling legislation, the Royal Commissions Act 1902 (Cth).

Royal Commissions have powers to issue a summons to a person to appear before the Commission at a hearing to give evidence or to produce documents specified in the summons; require witnesses to take an oath or give an affirmation; and require a person to deliver documents to the Commission at a specified place and time. A person served with a summons or a notice to produce documents must comply with that requirement, or face prosecution for an offence. The penalty for conviction upon such an offence is a fine of A$1,000 or six months imprisonment. A Royal Commission may authorise the Australian Federal Police to execute search warrants.

=== Reports ===
The Royal Commissioner was initially required to provide a final report by 18 April 2023, however in February 2023, the reporting date was extended to 30 June 2023. It was then extended for a second time with the new due date was 7 July 2023, to allow the commission to make referrals to the newly established National Anti-Corruption Commission, which became operational on 1 July 2023.

== Final report ==
The final report was released on 7 July 2023. It was three volumes and almost 1,000 pages long, and contained 57 recommendations for improved public policy design and a sealed section recommending the referral of individuals for civil and criminal prosecution.

The report concluded that the robodebt scheme was "devised without regard to the social security law", and that the use of income averaging in estimating entitlements "was essentially unfair, treating many people as though they had received income at a time when they had not". It found that public servants at the Department of Human Services (DHS) were aware that the scheme would involve income averaging, but mislead cabinet in neglecting to inform them, and that the DHS former Secretary, Kathryn Campbell, was made aware of the scheme's illegality but "failed to act" by ignoring legal advice. It also criticised former social services minister Scott Morrison, finding that he had "allowed cabinet to be misled" by not investigating the change in position by the DHS on robodebt's requirement for legislative change.

The report also criticised the government's "obliviousness to, or worse a callous disregard, of the fact that many welfare recipients had neither the means nor the ability to negotiate an online system" to provide evidence of years old income information in disputing debts. It described the scheme as "crude and cruel mechanism" that "made many people feel like criminals." It additionally criticised former government services minister Stuart Robert for publicly using false figures to defend robodebt, and what it described as former human service's minister Alan Tudge's "abuse of power" in leaking social security recipient's information to the media.

Holmes' preface to the report summarised the 57 recommendations: "Some are directed at strengthening the public service more broadly, some to improving the processes of the Department of Social Services and Services Australia. Others are concerned with reinforcing the capability of oversight agencies." Holmes noted however that the effectiveness of the suggested changes hinged on the top-down culture and robustness of the Australian Public Service, and improvements in political rhetoric and social attitudes regarding people receiving welfare payments.

=== Referrals ===
The report contains a "sealed" section which was not publicly released, which "recommends the referral of individuals for civil action or criminal prosecution". This section was sealed so as not to prejudice any civil or criminal proceedings that may arise. Several individuals were referred to four separate bodies. Although the Commissioner did not name them, the ABC reported them as the Australian Federal Police, the newly-established National Anti-Corruption Commission, a division of the Law Society, and the Australian Public Service Commissioner.

In August 2023, the Australian Public Service Commissioner announced that the Royal Commission had referred 16 bureaucrats for investigation of whether their Robodebt actions had breached the public service Code of Conduct.

== Aftermath ==
In the aftermath of the final report, Kathryn Campbell, secretary of the Department of Human Services from 2011 to 2017, was suspended without pay from her position as a special adviser on the AUKUS nuclear submarine project, a position with a $900,000 salary. Additionally, a PwC consultant who testified to the Royal Commission was fired in the hours after the final report was released.

== See also ==
- List of Australian royal commissions
