= Robodebt scheme =

Unlawful automated debt recovery scheme employed by the Australian government

The Robodebt scheme was an unlawful method of automated debt assessment and recovery implemented in Australia under the Liberal–National Coalition governments of Tony Abbott, Malcolm Turnbull, and Scott Morrison, and employed by the Australian government agency Services Australia as part of its Centrelink payment compliance program. Put in place in July 2016 and announced to the public in December of the same year, the scheme aimed to replace the formerly manual system of calculating overpayments and issuing debt notices to welfare recipients with an automated data-matching system that compared Centrelink records with averaged income data from the Australian Taxation Office.

The scheme has been the subject of considerable controversy, having been criticised by media, academics, advocacy groups, and politicians due to allegations of false or incorrectly calculated debt notices being issued, concerns over impacts on the physical and mental health of debt notice recipients, and questions about the lawfulness of the scheme. Robodebt has been the subject of an investigation by the Commonwealth Ombudsman, two Senate committee inquiries, several legal challenges, and a royal commission, Australia's highest form of public inquiry.

In May 2020, the Morrison government announced that it would scrap the debt recovery scheme, with 470,000 wrongly-issued debts to be repaid in full. Amid enormous public pressure, Prime Minister Scott Morrison stated during Question Time that "I would apologise for any hurt or harm in the way that the Government has dealt with that issue and to anyone else who has found themselves in those situations." However, the Morrison government never offered a formal apology before it was voted out of office in 2022.

The Australian government lost a 2019 lawsuit over the legality of the income averaging process and settled a class-action lawsuit in 2020. The scheme was further condemned by Federal Court Justice Bernard Murphy in his June 2021 ruling against the government, where he approved a A$1.8 billion settlement, including repayments of debts paid, wiping of outstanding debts, and legal costs.

Going into the 2022 Australian federal election, Australian Labor Party (ALP) leader Anthony Albanese pledged to hold a royal commission into the Robodebt scheme if his party was elected. After winning the election, the Albanese government officially commenced the Royal Commission into the Robodebt Scheme in August 2022. The commission handed down its report in July 2023, which called the scheme a "costly failure of public administration, in both human and economic terms", and referred several individuals to law enforcement agencies for prosecution. The report also specifically criticised former Prime Minister Scott Morrison, who oversaw the introduction of the scheme when he was the Minister for Social Services, for misleading Cabinet and failing in his ministerial duties. The commission referred Morrison to the National Anti-Corruption Commission, which concluded that Morrison had acted in reliance on departmental advice.

In October 2022, the Albanese government effectively forgave the debts of 197,000 people that were still under review. In August 2023, the Albanese government passed a formal motion of apology in the House of Representatives, apologising for the scheme on behalf of the Parliament.

== Origins ==
=== Background ===
Since the late 1970s, the Australian Taxation Office (ATO) has used data-matching systems to compare income data received from external sources with income reported by taxpayers, to ensure taxation compliance. In 2001, Services Australia (then the Department of Human Services) piloted a program that compared a customer’s Centrelink income details with ATO data, to identify discrepancies in the information provided to Centrelink. Where there was a discrepancy, Services Australia would decide if the customer had been overpaid and had a debt that should be recovered. This program (known as the Income Matching System, or IMS) was fully rolled out in 2004. The IMS identified roughly 300,000 possible discrepancies per year. Services Australia would identify and investigate roughly 20,000 of the highest risk discrepancies per year, but were unable to investigate the remaining discrepancies, due to the costs and resources involved in manually investigating and raising debts. The IMS continued largely unchanged until the introduction of the Robodebt scheme in 2016.

=== Creation and announcement ===
In April 2015, measures to create budgetary savings by increasing the pursuit of outstanding debts and investigation of cases of fraud in the Australian welfare system were first flagged by the Minister for Social Services Scott Morrison and the Minister for Human Services Marise Payne, and formally announced by the Abbott government in the 2015 Australian federal budget. Initial estimates in the 2015 budget projected that the scheme would recoup A$1.5 billion for the government.

In 2015, the Department of Human Services conducted a two-stage pilot of the Robodebt scheme, targeting debts of selected welfare recipients that were accrued between 2011–2013. Following the 2015 Liberal Party Leadership Spill and 2016 Australian federal election, the Turnbull government implemented an overhaul of the federal welfare budget in an effort to crack down on Centrelink overpayments believed to have occurred between 2010 and 2013 under the Gillard government.

On 20 September 2015, Prime Minister Malcolm Turnbull announced that Christian Porter would replace Scott Morrison as Social Services Minister as part of a Cabinet overhaul.

In July 2016, the manual system began to be replaced with the Online Compliance Intervention, an automated data-matching technique with less human oversight, capable of identifying and issuing computer-generated debt notices to welfare recipients who had potentially been overpaid. The new system was fully online by September 2016. In December 2016, Christian Porter publicly announced the implementation of this new automated debt recovery scheme – which was given the colloquial name "Robodebt" by the media – was estimated to be capable of issuing debt notices at a rate of 20,000 a week.

== Operation and public reaction ==
=== Iterations and official names ===
The scheme went through several iterations and formal names, including:

- PAYG Manual Compliance Intervention program, from 1 July 2015 to 1 July 2016, including the associated pilot programs from early 2015 to 30 June 2015.
- Online Compliance Intervention from 1 July 2016 to 10 February 2017.
- Employment Income Confirmation from 11 February 2017 to 30 September 2018.
- Check and Update Past Income from 30 September 2018 to 29 May 2020.

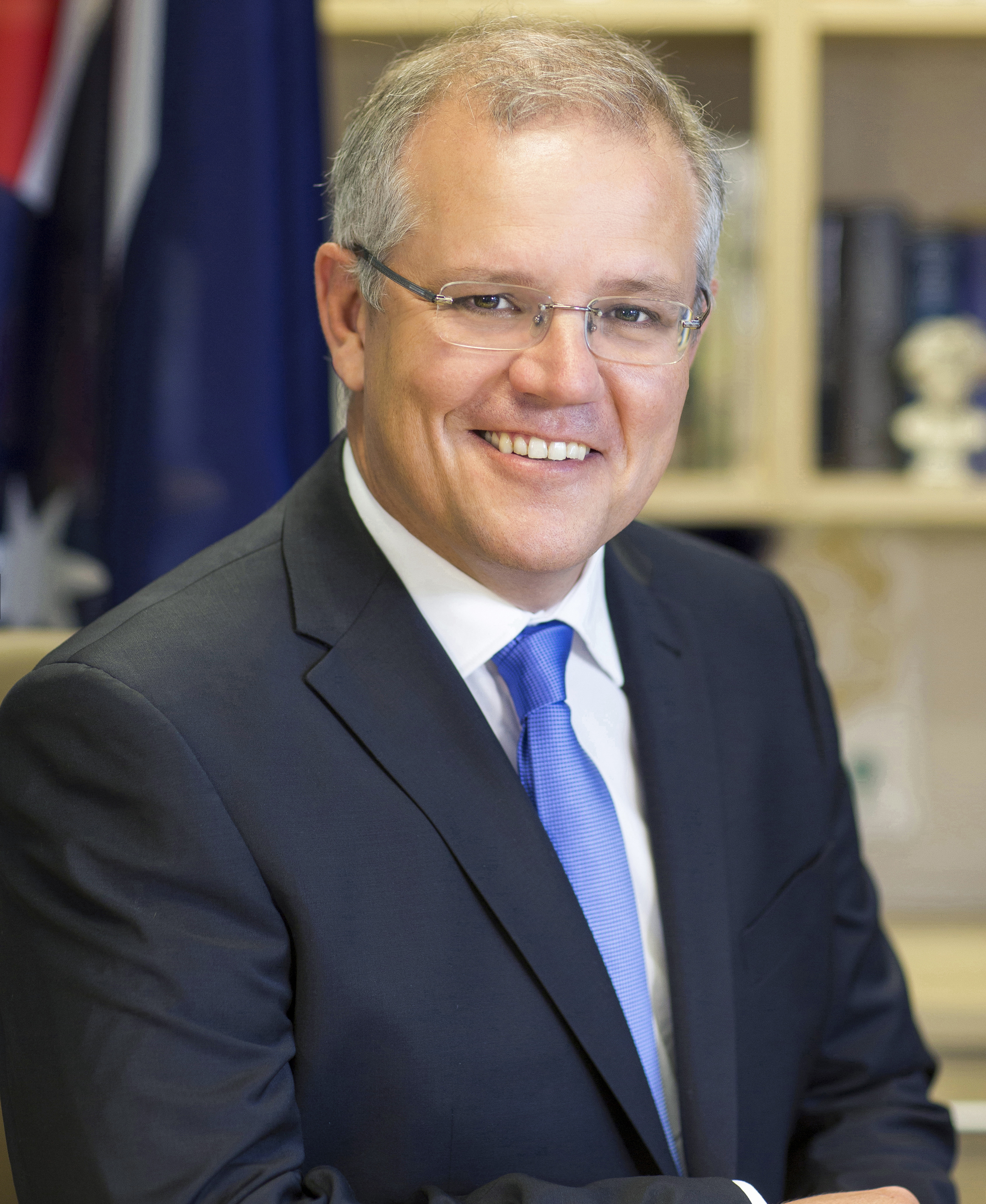
Scott Morrison, Minister for Social Services (December 2014 to September 2015)

=== Debt recovery efforts ===
In early January 2017, six months after the commencement of automated debt recovery, it was announced that the scheme had issued 169,000 debt notices and recovered A$300 million. Based on these figures, it was suggested that a similar automated debt recovery system would be applied to the Aged Pension and Disability Pension, in order to potentially recover a further A$1 billion.

The 2018 Australian federal budget indicated that the Robodebt data matching scheme would be extended into 2021 with the aim of recovering an additional A$373 million from welfare recipients.

Services Australia announced in September 2019 that expenditure on the Robodebt program was A$606 million while recouping A$785 million.

=== Reactions and critiques ===
Opponents of the Robodebt scheme said that errors in the system were leading to welfare recipients paying non-existent debts or debts that were larger than what they actually owed, whilst some welfare recipients had been required to make payments while contesting their debts. In some cases, the debts being pursued dated back further than the ATO requests that Australians retain their documentation. Particular criticism focused on the burden of proof being moved from Centrelink needing to verify the information, to being on the individual to prove they did not owe the funds, with human interaction being very limited in the dispatch of the debt letters. The system also did not explain the details of the overpayment including when the overpayment occurred or how the debts were calculated.

Politicians from the Australian Labor Party, Australian Greens, Pauline Hanson's One Nation, and Independent Andrew Wilkie criticised the scheme and its automated debt calculation methods. The scheme was also criticized by advocacy groups for people affected by poverty, disadvantage, and inequality, including the Australian Council of Social Services (ACOSS) and the Saint Vincent de Paul Society.

=== Allegations of misconduct ===
Allegations levelled against the scheme by the media, former and current welfare recipients, advocacy groups, politicians and relatives of welfare recipients include:

- Welfare recipients' suicide after receiving automated debt recovery notices for significant sums.
- Debt notices were issued to deceased people.
- Issuing debt notices to disability pensioners.
- Revelations that debt notices were issued to 663 vulnerable people (people with complex needs like mental illness and abuse victims) who died soon after.

== Initial investigations ==
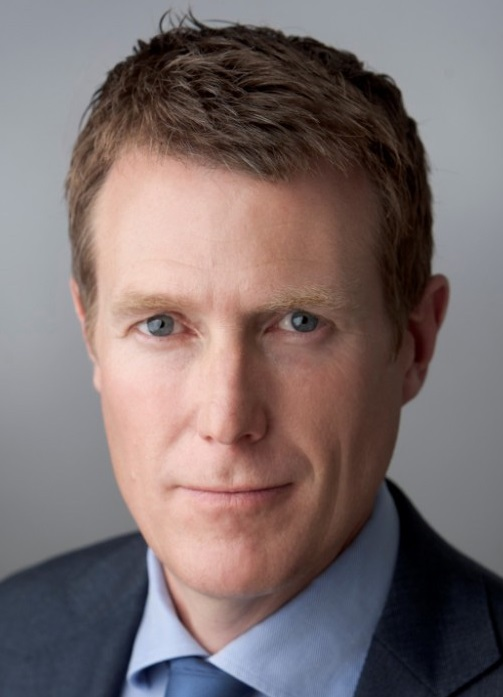
Christian Porter, Minister for Social Services (September 2015 to December 2017)

=== Commonwealth Ombudsman investigation ===
After the Turnbull government implemented the Robodebt scheme, many recipients of debt notices filed complaints with the Commonwealth Ombudsman. This led to the agency investigating the scheme, with the final report and recommendations delivered in April 2017. The ombudsman recommended that the Department of Human Services (DHS) should:

- reassess the debts raised by the scheme
- improve the clarity of debt notices and give customers better information
- inform customers that their ATO income will be averaged across the relevant period if they do not enter their income information
- notify welfare recipients that debts based on averaged ATO income may be less accurate
- help welfare recipients to gather evidence with which to effectively respond to debt notices.

The ombudsman also recommended that before expanding the scheme, the DHS should undertake a comprehensive evaluation of the scheme in its current form, and consider how to mitigate the risk of possible over-recovery of debts.

=== First Senate committee inquiry ===
The Robodebt scheme was the subject of a Senate committee inquiry beginning in 2017. The inquiry had a number of findings and made a number of recommendations, including:

- "That a lack of procedural fairness is evident in every stage of the program, which should be put on hold until all procedural fairness flaws are addressed".
- "That the Robodebt scheme disempowered people, causing emotional trauma, stress and shame".
- "That the Department of Human Services has a fundamental conflict of interest – the harder it is for people to navigate this system and prove their correct income data, the more money the department recoups".
- "That the Department of Human Services should resume full responsibility for calculating verifiable debts (including manual checking) relating to income support overpayments, which are based on actual fortnightly earnings and not an assumed average; and provide those issued debt notices with the debt calculation data required to be assured any debts are correct".

=== Legal challenges ===
In February 2019, Legal Aid Victoria announced a federal court challenge of the scheme's calculations used to estimate debt, stating that the calculations assumed that people are working regular, full-time hours when calculating income. In November 2019, the federal government agreed to orders by the Federal Court of Australia in Amato v the Commonwealth that the averaging process using ATO income data to calculate debts was unlawful, and announced that it would no longer raise debts without first gathering evidence – such as payslips – to prove a person had underreported their earnings to Centrelink.

On 16 November 2020, the Australian government announced a $1.2 billion settlement of robodebt claims, with approximately 400,000 people receiving compensation. This settlement was in addition to amounts that the Commonwealth government had already agreed to refund or cease pursuing in other cases.

== Demise and further investigations ==
=== Demise ===
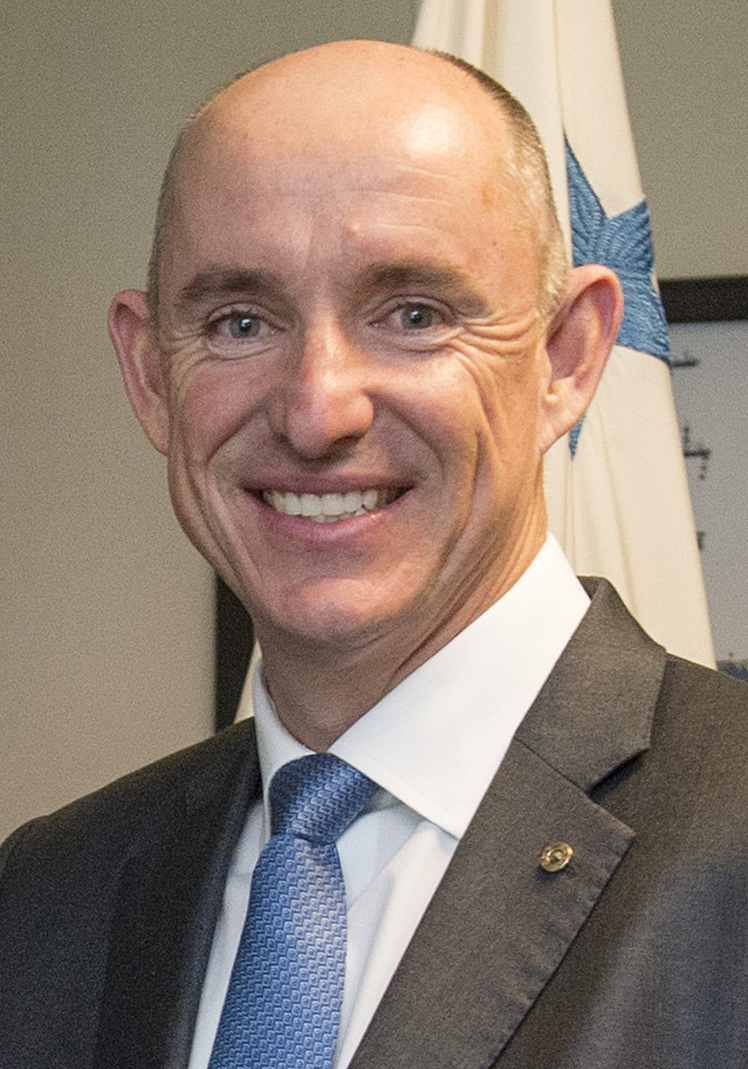
Stuart Robert, Minister for Government Services (May 2019 – March 2021)

On 29 May 2020, Stuart Robert, Minister for Government Services announced that the Robodebt debt recovery scheme was to be scrapped by the Government, with 470,000 wrongly-issued debts to be repaid in full.

Initially, the total sum of the repayments was estimated to be A$721 million. However, in November 2020 this figure expanded to A$1.2 billion after the Australian government settled a class-action lawsuit before it could go to trial.

On 31 May 2020, Attorney-General Christian Porter, who was Minister for Social Services when the Robodebt system was first implemented, and who had previously defended the scheme, conceded that the use of averaged income data to calculate welfare overpayments was unlawful, stating that there was "no lawful basis for it".

After weeks of criticism from the Opposition, in June 2020, Prime Minister Scott Morrison, in response to a question from the opposition concerning a particular victim of the scheme, stated in parliament that "I would apologise for any hurt or harm in the way that the Government has dealt with that issue and to anyone else who has found themselves in those situations". As of 31 July 2020, it was announced that A$224 million had been repaid to more than 145,000 welfare recipients.

On 11 June 2021, the Federal Court approved a A$1.872 billion settlement incorporating repayment of A$751 million, wiping of all remaining debts, and the legal costs running to A$8.4 million. In ruling against the scheme, Justice Bernard Murphy described it as a "shameful chapter in the administration of the commonwealth" and "a massive failure of public administration". The Federal Treasurer Josh Frydenberg said the government accepted the settlement, but distanced himself from the suicides and mental health issues surrounding the administration of the scheme. Services Australia has stated they will commence repayments in 2022 to people who have overpaid according to debt recalculations.

In October 2022, the Albanese Government effectively forgave the debts of 197,000 people who were still under review.

=== Second Senate committee inquiry ===
The scheme was again the subject of a Senate committee inquiry, which began in 2019.

In the July 2020 hearing, Kathryn Campbell (former head of Services Australia) denied that the scheme had led to welfare recipients suiciding after receiving debt notices, despite allegations from Centrelink staff and the family members of welfare recipients who took their own lives.

Senator Deborah O'Neill in the August 2020 hearing, read two letters from mothers whose sons died by suicide following the receiving of a Robodebt notice.

Initially meant to report its findings in December 2019, the inquiry's deadline was extended six times, with the Senate committee delivering its final report in May 2022.

The five interim reports found that the Robodebt scheme had "indiscriminately targeted some of Australia’s most vulnerable people", and that vulnerable people must be protected from government misuse of technology. It also found that the government had lacked rigour and ignored early warnings, and that the govennment was still withholding critical information about the Income Compliance Program. It noted that the committee had been hindered in producing its final report due to "entrenched resistance and opacity" from ministers and departments.

The sixth and final report made a single recommendation - that "the Commonwealth Government should establish a Royal Commission into the Robodebt scheme".

== Royal Commission ==
In June 2020, the Greens and Labor called for a Royal Commission into Robodebt, to "determine those responsible for the scheme, and its impact on Australians". These calls were reiterated by university academics, and by ACOSS, which stated that "although some restitution has been delivered to victims of Robodebt, they have not received justice".

In May 2022, the sixth and final report from the second Senate inquiry into the scheme recommended a Royal Commission, "to completely understand how the failures of the Income Compliance Program came to pass, and why they were allowed to continue for so long despite the dire impacts on people issued with debts".

In June 2020 Labor had stated that only a Royal Commission would be able to obtain the truth about Robodebt. Labor subsequently budgeted $30M in its election costings for the 2022 election for a Royal Commission into the Robodebt Scheme. ACOSS chief executive Cassandra Goldie welcomed this saying "The Robodebt affair was not just a maladministration scandal, it was a human tragedy that resulted in people taking their lives".

Following Labor’s election win, Prime Minister Anthony Albanese announced the Royal Commission into the Robodebt Scheme, with Letters Patent issued on 25 August 2022. The Royal Commission was chaired by former Queensland Supreme Court Justice Catherine Holmes and was expected to conclude on 18 April 2023. The deadline was extended twice, first until 30 June and later until 7 July 2023.

In November 2022 it was disclosed that legal advice before the scheme started was that it did not comply with legislation. Commissioner Catherine Holmes asked DSS lawyer Anne Pulford, "You get an advice in draft, and if it's not favourable you just leave it that way?"; Pulford responded "Yes, Commissioner".

=== Referrals for investigation ===
The final report of the Royal Commission was released on 7 July 2023. Along with 57 recommendations, a sealed section referred several unnamed individuals for further investigation or action, to four separate bodies:

- the Australian Federal Police
- the National Anti-Corruption Commission
- the Law Society (although it is unclear which jurisdiction), and
- the Australian Public Service Commissioner.

=== Immediate outcomes ===
Kathryn Campbell, then working on the AUKUS program at the Department of Defence, was suspended without pay from her role on 20 July. Kathryn Campbell resigned from the Department of Defence effective 21 July 2023.

Colleen Taylor, a former employee of the department, received a 2024 King's Birthday Honour for her efforts to expose the scheme. Taylor had tried to raise concerns internally in 2017, and had testified at the Royal Commission.

== Media portrayal ==
A 2024 book on the Robodebt scandal, Mean Streak, by Rick Morton, won the A$80,000 Prime Minister's Literary Awards prize for non-fiction in 2025.

A three-part docu-drama series, The People vs Robodebt, commissioned by the SBS TV network, was first broadcast in September 2025. The film won the AACTA Award for Best Documentary or Factual Program in 2026.

== Further inquiries ==
=== Australian Public Service Commission ===
In September 2024, the Australian Public Service Commission announced that its investigation into the individuals had concluded, leading to several fines and demotions. No individuals were fired from their role.

Following the findings of public service misconduct, lawyers representing the class action announced they would appeal their previous $1.8B settlement, seeking compensation for the further breaches uncovered.

=== National Anti-Corruption Commission ===
Initially, the National Anti-Corruption Commission (NACC) decided not to pursue an investigation of six individuals referred to it by the Royal Commission. In June 2024, the NACC stated it was unlikely to obtain new evidence and noted that five of the six were already under investigation by the Australian Public Service Commission. A former NSW Supreme Court judge, Anthony Whealy, stated that the NACC's refusal to investigate the individuals meant that it had "betrayed its core obligation and failed to carry out its primary statutory duty". The NACC's decision received over 1,200 complaints, sparking an independent inquiry into the decision by the Inspector of the NACC, Ms Gail Furness SC.

The Inspector obtained documents relating to the decision, and requested submissions from the NACC by October. The Inspector found that Commissioner Paul Brereton had a perceived conflict on interest due to a "close association" with one of the individuals involved, and should have recused himself from the decision. The NACC appointed an independent person to reconsider the decision not to investigate. In February 2025, the NACC decided that it would investigate the six individuals referred to it.

In March 2026, the NACC published the findings of the Operation Myrtleford investigation into the six individuals referred by the Royal Commission. The investigation found that two former public servants – former Department of Human Services General Manager Mark Withnell and former Deputy Secretary Serena Wilson – had engaged in serious corrupt conduct. The commission cleared the remaining four referrals, including former Prime Minister Scott Morrison and former departmental secretary Kathryn Campbell. The NACC concluded that Morrison's failure to detect misleading departmental advice did not constitute a breach of his personal obligations of honesty or good faith, instead attributing the failures to systemic shortcomings within the federal departments. The findings diverged from those of the Royal Commission in several key respects, particularly regarding individual intent, and the NACC did not refer any individuals for criminal prosecution.

== See also ==
- Dutch childcare benefits scandal
- British Post Office scandal
