= Stuart Robert =

Australian politician (born 1970)

The Honourable Stuart Robert
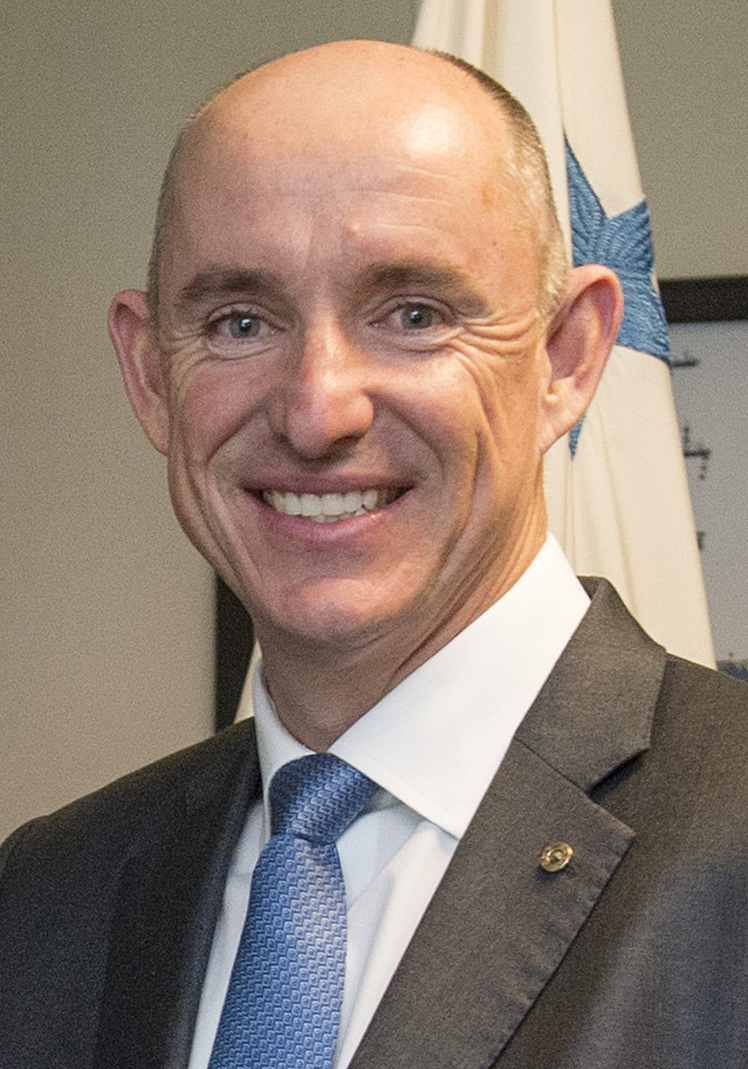

Minister for Employment, Workforce, Skills, Small and Family Business
- In office 30 March 2021 – 23 May 2022
- Prime Minister: Scott Morrison
- Preceded by: Michaelia Cash
- Succeeded by: Richard Marles

Minister for Government Services
- In office 29 May 2019 – 30 March 2021
- Prime Minister: Scott Morrison
- Preceded by: Michael Keenan
- Succeeded by: Linda Reynolds

Minister for the National Disability Insurance Scheme
- In office 29 May 2019 – 30 March 2021
- Prime Minister: Scott Morrison
- Preceded by: Sarah Henderson
- Succeeded by: Linda Reynolds

Assistant Treasurer
- In office 26 August 2018 – 26 May 2019
- Prime Minister: Scott Morrison
- Preceded by: Michael Sukkar
- Succeeded by: Michael Sukkar

Minister for Human Services
- In office 21 September 2015 – 18 February 2016
- Prime Minister: Malcolm Turnbull
- Preceded by: Marise Payne
- Succeeded by: Alan Tudge

Minister for Veterans' Affairs Minister Assisting the Prime Minister for the Centenary of ANZAC
- In office 21 September 2015 – 18 February 2016
- Prime Minister: Malcolm Turnbull
- Preceded by: Michael Ronaldson
- Succeeded by: Dan Tehan

Assistant Minister for Defence
- In office 18 September 2013 – 21 September 2015
- Prime Minister: Tony Abbott; Malcolm Turnbull
- Preceded by: Warren Snowdon
- Succeeded by: Mal Brough

Member of the Australian Parliament for Fadden
- In office 24 November 2007 – 18 May 2023
- Preceded by: David Jull
- Succeeded by: Cameron Caldwell

Personal details
- Born: Stuart Rowland Robert; 11 December 1970 (age 55) Cranbourne, Victoria, Australia
- Party: Liberal (since 1991; federal)
- Other political affiliations: Liberal National (state)
- Spouse: Chantelle
- Children: 3
- Education: Royal Military College Duntroon; Central Queensland University; Queensland University of Technology; University of New South Wales
- Occupation: Business recruitment officer
- Awards: Australian Service Medal; Australian Defence Medal

Military service
- Branch/service: Australian Army
- Years of service: 1988–1999
- Rank: Captain
- Unit: 3RAR; 51FNQR

Stuart Rowland Robert (born 11 December 1970) is an Australian former politician who served as Minister for Employment, Workforce, Skills, Small and Family Business from 2021 to 2022, following his appointment as Minister for Government Services and Minister for the National Disability Insurance Scheme in 2019. He was also appointed Acting Minister for Education and Youth in December 2021 and was the Member of Parliament (MP) for Fadden upon winning the seat at the 2007 federal election, until his resignation in May 2023.

Robert served in the Abbott Ministry as the Assistant Minister for Defence from 18 September 2013 until 21 September 2015. Following a leadership spill in the preceding week, new Prime Minister Malcolm Turnbull appointed Robert to the roles of Minister for Veterans' Affairs, Minister for Human Services and Minister Assisting the Prime Minister for the Centenary of ANZAC. Following an investigation into a possible conflict of interest, Robert announced his resignation from the Ministry on 12 February 2016.

Robert later served as Assistant Treasurer from August 2018 and in 2021 was appointed to Cabinet as Employment Minister, a role in which he served until the May 2022 general election, when the Coalition lost power. He resigned from Parliament in May 2023.

== Background and early years ==
Robert was born in Victoria and spent his early years growing up on a sugar cane farm in Bundaberg, Queensland. He was educated at Rockhampton Grammar School where he secured a scholarship to the Australian Defence Force Academy as an Army Officer Cadet at the age of 17. Following the Academy, Robert attended the Royal Military College Duntroon.

He completed a Masters in Business Administration at Central Queensland University, a Masters in Information Technology at the Queensland University of Technology and graduated from the University of New South Wales with a Bachelor of Arts with Honours.

== Early career ==
=== Military career ===
Robert's professional career began in the military where he served for twelve years in units including the 3rd Battalion, The Royal Australian Regiment and the 51st Battalion, The Far North Queensland Regiment. It was also during this time that Robert completed his master's degrees, mostly part-time.

The majority of Robert's military career was spent working within military intelligence and security, including a four-month tour of duty with the peace monitoring force in Bougainville following the civil war. Robert reached the rank of captain.

=== Business career ===
After leaving the army in 1999, Robert founded the IT services firm GMT Recruitment, with colleague Andrew Chantler. GMT Recruitment subsequently grew to be a nationwide company and was named a Business Review Weekly "Fast 100" award winner in 2006. The list, which recognised the fastest-growing 100 companies in Australia, again featured GMT Recruitment in both 2007 and 2008.

== Political career ==
In 1991, Robert joined the Liberal Party. As he later explained to parliament, "I was motivated to action as I witnessed the diabolical consequences of the recession which, apparently, 'we had to have', the crippling interest rates and the very high level of industrial disputes which so adversely impacted on my family and many surrounding families. Through all of this turbulence, the urgency to ensure that this place [was] governed for all Australia and not just for sectional interests became self-evident." In 2007 Robert was elected to the House of Representatives representing the seat of Fadden. Two years later, on 8 December 2009, he was appointed Shadow Parliamentary Secretary for Defence. On 14 September 2010 he was promoted to Shadow Minister for Defence Science, Technology and Personnel.

After the 2013 federal election Robert was appointed the Assistant Minister for Defence in the Abbott Government. After the change of prime minister in September 2015, he was appointed Minister for Veterans' Affairs, Minister for Human Services and Minister Assisting the Prime Minister for the Centenary of ANZAC with effect from 21 September 2015.

In August 2018, Peter Dutton unsuccessfully challenged Malcolm Turnbull for the leadership of the Liberal Party. Leadership tension continued to build, and the party voted to hold a second ballot on 24 August, with Turnbull choosing not to stand. During this time Robert is widely reported to have worked to support for the candidacy of Scott Morrison for the leadership of the Liberal party. Robert was later appointed as Assistant Treasurer in the first Morrison Ministry.

Following the Coalition's re-election in May 2019 Robert was promoted to Cabinet and appointed as Minister for the National Disability Insurance Scheme and Minister for Government Services - two areas identified as key priorities by Prime Minister Morrison for his Government.

During his time in Parliament, Robert was aligned with the Centre-Right faction of the Liberal Party.

=== National Disability Insurance Scheme ===
In June 2019, in response to delays and backlogs for children with disability in accessing Early Childhood Early Intervention (ECEI) supports through the NDIS, Robert directed the National Disability Insurance Agency to provide standardised interim plans to children who have been found eligible for the NDIS, but who are likely to experience a wait time of greater than 50 days.

News coverage in January 2021 noted that "NDIS waiting times have dropped after concerted efforts from the Federal Government and the National Disability Insurance Agency". The report found 85 per cent of NDIS participants rating their planning experience as “very good” or “good”. A spokesman for the government said the Federal Government had made improving access and planning decision timeframes a priority, and had made “significant improvements since May 2019”.

In February 2021, Robert pressed ahead with introducing legislative amendments to parliament after a court ruled sex services were not excluded under law from being taxpayer funded through the NDIS saying:

“NDIS participants can still freely use their own money, whether that is through government support or earned income, to spend on whatever they want. All we are saying is taxpayer NDIS funds were never intended to be used in this way and we'll be ensuring this does not happen again.”

=== Government Services ===
==== Services Australia ====
As Minister for Government Services Robert oversaw the establishment of Services Australia. In July 2019 he appointed Martin Hoffman to lead a taskforce to develop a strategic plan to deliver the reform to government service delivery. Robert appointed Rebecca Skinner as CEO of Services Australia in March 2020.

==== Support for Black Summer Bushfires ====
Services Australia staff deployed as part of the emergency response to the 2019-20 Black Summer Bushfires. Robert told Parliament that Services Australia had provided support deploying more than 20 mobile support teams into dozens of hard-to-reach communities, and delivered millions of dollars via thousands of disaster payments to fire-affected residents. He noted Services Australia also successfully trialed facial verification technology to provide support to those who had lost identity documents.

==== Government Services Response to COVID-19 Pandemic ====
As Minister for Government Services, Robert led Services Australia's response to the COVID-19 pandemic.

In March 2020 the National Cabinet closed large sections of the Australian economy driving a high demand for social supports and saw thousands of people queue outside Centrelink offices to apply for government payments. That month, the government's digital welfare platform, MyGov, experienced an outage as thousands of people were logging on to register for welfare services. Robert incorrectly claimed in a press conference that it due to a DDoS attack rather than the large number of people trying to log into MyGov. He corrected himself later that day.

Following a surge of 12,000 staff drawn from across the Australian Public Service and service partners, Services Australia processed as many JobSeeker claims within roughly 50 days as it normally would in two years. The agency granted financial assistance to over 800,000 Australians.

On Sunday 7 February 2021 Robert announced Services Australia would ensure Australians would be able to tap and display COVID-19 “proof of vaccination” certificates on their phones or carry hard copies with them.

==== Future of Government Services ====
In December 2020 Robert announced a refurbished Services Australia Service Centre in Western Australia would be used to trial a “new era” of government service delivery. The Perth City Service Centre would offer a new “welcoming environment” that has been designed specifically to help older Australians who need additional support. Robert said the new centre would offer upgraded self-service facilities and digital support, appointment-based services, and specialist services made available through video chat.

=== Employment, Workforce, Skills, Small and Family Business ===
In March 2021 Robert was promoted to the role of Minister for Employment, Workforce, Skills, Small and Family Business. He also retained responsibility for whole-of-government technology through the Digital Transformation Agency.

=== Resignation ===
On 6 May 2023 Robert announced that he would resign from parliament, which he submitted on 18 May 2023. A by-election for the seat of Fadden was called. Robert did not return to Canberra for the remainder of his time in office. He quit parliament four months before a parliament committee referred him to the National Anti-Corruption Committee over allegations he misused his political office to promote a friends’ business.

== Controversies ==
=== China trip and resignation from ministry ===
On 18 August 2014, Robert attended an event in Beijing, China, at which a mining deal between Australian company Nimrod Resources and Chinese state-controlled corporation China Minmetals was signed. In February 2016, when details of the trip were released, the Opposition called Robert's presence at the signing "inappropriate", because Nimrod chairman Paul Marks was both a friend of his and a substantial donor to the Liberal Party. Robert claimed that the trip was in a "private capacity", and not official government business.

In a subsequent Senate Estimates Committee hearing, officials from the Department of Foreign Affairs and Trade (DFAT) stated that the department had not been informed of the trip until Robert had returned, and that it appeared that Chinese officials at the event were under the impression that Robert was present as an Australian government minister. Prime Minister Turnbull asked his department secretary, Martin Parkinson, to investigate and report on the circumstances of Robert's visit to China to determine if he had breached ministerial standards of conduct.

On 12 February 2016, Robert announced his resignation from the First Turnbull Ministry as part of a broader reshuffle triggered by the resignation of Andrew Robb and Warren Truss.

=== Robodebt ===
Robert was criticised for his involvement in establishing the illegal Robodebt scheme during his time as minister for government services. The scheme saw hundreds of thousands of people issued with computer-generated debt notices using a highly flawed income-averaging method; 470,000 debts generated by the scheme were eventually waived and a $1.23 billion refund and compensation settlement was made for victims in November 2020. Despite a court ruling against Robodebt in 2019, Robert did not apologise for any errors made under the scheme, stating "the government makes no apologies for fulfilling our legal obligation to collect debts". Robert defended Robodebt until 2020, when it was found unlawful by Australian courts.

At the Royal Commission into the Robodebt Scheme, Robert admitted to lying to the public about the scheme while it was active, stating he chose not to report his personal feelings about flaws within it, and instead defended it out of "cabinet solidarity". The Commission's final report accepted that politicians could be expected to adhere to cabinet solidarity, though found that Robert went further by "making statements of fact as to the accuracy of debts, citing statistics which he knew could not be right", adding that "Nothing compels ministers to knowingly make false statements." Renée Leon, the former Secretary of the Department of Human Services, testified to the Commission that when she informed Robert that Robodebt was illegal and encouraged an apology for the scheme, he responded by saying "We will absolutely not be doing that. We will double down."

=== Crime and Corruption Commission – Operation Belcarra ===
In March 2017, it was revealed that Robert would appear at a public hearing of the Queensland Crime and Corruption Commission named Operation Belcarra, inquiring into the possibly illegal conduct of candidates in some local government elections. It was alleged that some candidates had formed an undeclared group, and provided an electoral funding and financial disclosure return that was false or misleading. The Crime and Corruption Commission found it would "not be in the public interest" to take any further action.

=== Possible breaches of Constitution and company law ===
In 2017, it was revealed that GMT Group, a company that Robert had founded, had been awarded government contracts worth millions of dollars. This meant that he had been ineligible for election to Parliament under Section 44 of the Constitution of Australia; Robert's situation had similarities to that of Bob Day, who had been disqualified under s. 44. However, because Robert had been re-elected to Parliament after relinquishing his interests in the company, there was no possibility of the previous elections being challenged in the High Court.

It has also been reported that Robert's parents were listed as the directors of his company for six years without their knowledge. Australian Securities and Investments Commission investigated the claims.

=== Internet usage ===
In October 2018, Prime Minister Scott Morrison announced that he had asked the Special Minister of State, Alex Hawke, to investigate Robert's internet bills. Concerns were raised about excessive use of taxpayer money to fund his Internet bills Although the plan had been approved by the Department of Finance, the Department said that they had warned Robert 'multiple times' about the unusually high costs of his home internet. Robert voluntarily repaid $37,975 of claimed allowance.

=== Business connection with Cryo Australia ===
In October 2018, a newspaper revealed Robert had joined a business selling cryotherapy devices. The business founder was a convicted rapist, who at the time was before Queensland's highest court on appeal against the conviction. Robert said he did not realise the background of the company's founder until contacted by the media. Robert resigned his director's position after two and a half weeks. Cryo Australia was liquidated shortly thereafter and Robert reportedly lost a huge sum of money.

=== Australian Research Council grants vetoed ===
In the 2021 round for projects to begin in 2022, the Australian Research Council approved nearly 600 research grants. Robert, as acting education minister, vetoed six grants in the humanities as, in his own view, failing the national interest tests for the grant. He was criticised by academics and politicians for interference with expert evaluation, for the delay in making his decision, and for announcing it "under cover" of Christmas Eve.

=== Synergy 360 allegations ===
In 2022, allegations were made that in 2017 and 2018, Robert had secretly given advice to a firm called Synergy 360 on how its clients could win government contracts. Although not on the lobbyist register, Synergy 360 mainly functioned as a lobbying firm for clients which included Infosys, Unisys, Delv and Salesforce. It was claimed that as a Minister, Robert intervened to help Infosys win a contract at Centrelink.

Current NDIS Minister Bill Shorten ordered an inquiry into the allegations, which was finalised in March 2023. The review covered 95 procurement processes, identifying many which appeared inconsistent with good practice. In May 2023, a parliamentary committee commenced an Inquiry to investigate further.

The parliamentary committee heard that in 2017, Synergy 360 had proposed a structure where Robert would benefit financially from awarding contracts to its clients. A former business partner testified that the company's directors planned to transfer a 20% share of the company's stock to an entity controlled by John Margerison, on behalf of Robert. Margerison was a director of Synergy 360, and an old friend of Robert, whose property investments and health companies were also allegedly awarded contracts.

Before the parliamentary committee could question him on 28 July, John Margerison moved overseas to an undisclosed country, and "severed all ties" with Australia. Margerison's friend Mike Ribot had taken over his directorship of Social Solutions WA, and had purchased Margerison's $5 million house. It was later reported that business associates believed John Margerison to have moved to Dubai with his new partner, having left his wife and children in Australia.

Despite this, Margerison was still the director of 10 Australian companies, and had left behind $20 million in loans to a disability housing charity. To add to the confusion, a Singapore-based web hosting service had published at least 10 websites presenting differing accounts of John Margerison's identity.

The allegations were referred to the Prime Minister's Department, and the Australian Greens stated they planned to refer the matter to the National Anti-Corruption Commission. This referral came in September 2023.

=== Post-politics business ===
Investigative journalist Nick McKenzie revealed in October 2024 that Robert had been leveraging his work as Australia's inaugural digital minister as part of a $500 million venture to build a giant data centre to store defence secrets and other sensitive government information. The deal, if realised, could be worth hundreds of millions of dollars and deliver a windfall to Robert and his backers, including members of Scott Morrison’s inner-circle.

== Personal life ==
Robert has been married to his wife Chantelle since 1996, and has three sons.

Parliament of Australia
| Preceded by David Jull | Member for Fadden; 2007–2023 | Succeeded by Cameron Caldwell |
Political offices
| Preceded by Warren Snowdon as Minister for Defence Science and Personnel | Assistant Minister for Defence; 2013–2015 | Succeeded by Darren Chester |
| Preceded by Marise Payne | Minister for Human Services; 2015–2016 | Succeeded by Alan Tudge |
| Preceded by Michael Ronaldson | Minister for Veterans' Affairs; Minister Assisting the Prime Minister on the Centenary of ANZAC; 2015–2016 | Succeeded by Dan Tehan |
| Preceded by Kelly O'Dwyer as Minister for Revenue and Financial Services | Assistant Treasurer; 2018–2019 | Succeeded by Michael Sukkar |
| New title | Minister for the National Disability Insurance Scheme; 2019–2021 | Succeeded by Linda Reynolds |
| Preceded by Michael Keenan | Minister for Government Services; 2019–2021 | Succeeded by Linda Reynolds |
| Preceded by Michaelia Cash as Minister for Employment, Skills, Small and Family Business | Minister for Employment, Workforce, Skills, Small and Family Business; 2021–2022 | Succeeded by Richard Marles as Minister for Employment |
| Preceded by Michaelia Cash as Minister for Employment, Skills, Small and Family Business | Minister for Employment, Workforce, Skills, Small and Family Business; 2021–2022 | Succeeded by Julie Collins as Minister for Small Business |
| Preceded by Michaelia Cash as Minister for Employment, Skills, Small and Family Business | Minister for Employment, Workforce, Skills, Small and Family Business; 2021–2022 | Succeeded by Andrew Giles as Minister for Skills and Training |
