= Centrelink =

Federal social security program of the Australian Government

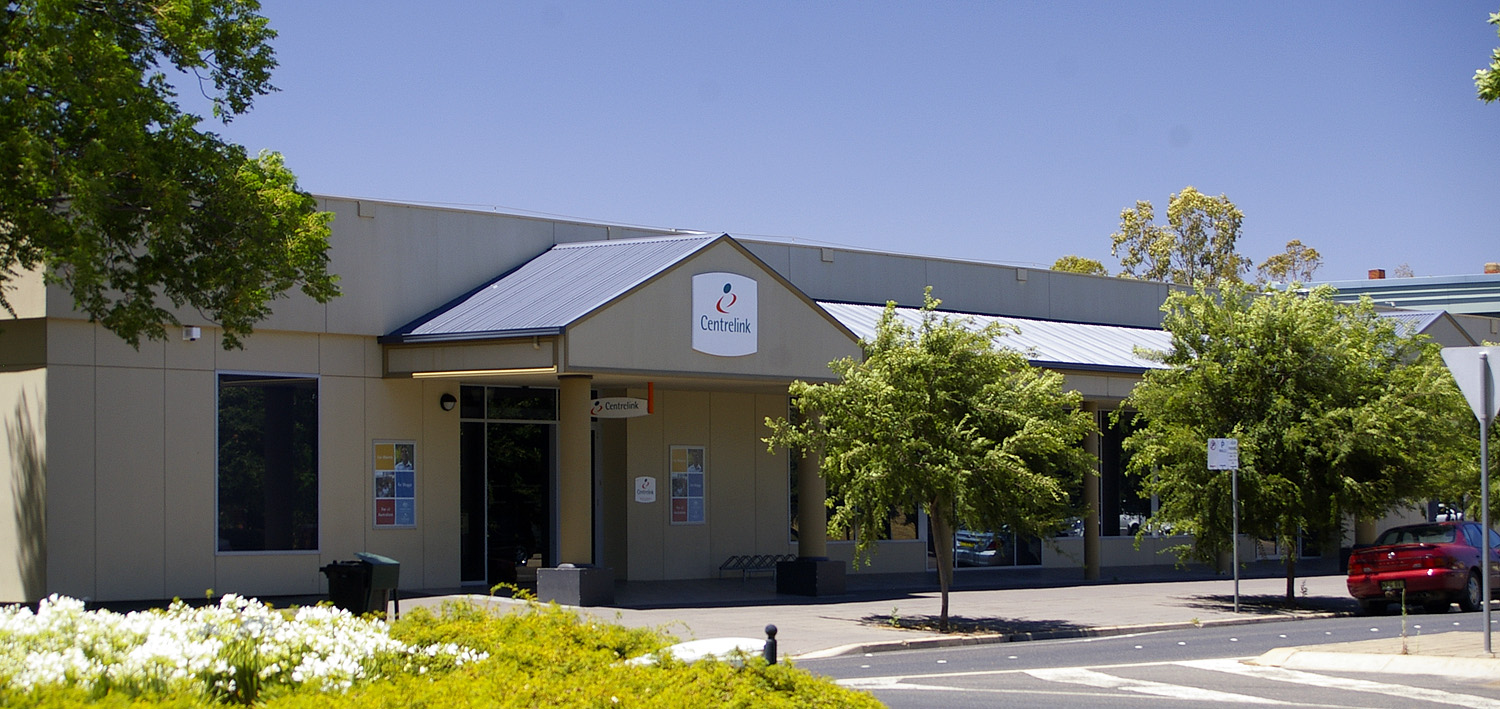
- Centrelink office in Wagga Wagga, New South Wales

Agency overview
- Formed: 1997; 29 years ago
- Preceding agency: Commonwealth Services Delivery Agency
- Type: Program
- Jurisdiction: Australia
- Motto: Giving You Options
- Minister responsible: Katy Gallagher, Minister for Government Services
- Parent department: Services Australia
- Key document: Human Services (Centrelink) Act 1997
- Website: servicesaustralia.gov.au/centrelink

Centrelink logo until 2012

The Centrelink Master Program, or more commonly known as Centrelink, is a Services Australia master program of the Australian Government. It delivers a range of government payments and services for retirees, the unemployed, families, carers, parents, people with disabilities, Indigenous Australians, students, apprentices and people from diverse cultural and linguistic backgrounds, and provides services at times of major change. The majority of Centrelink's services are the disbursement of social security payments.

== History and operations ==
Centrelink commenced initially as a government agency of the Department of Social Security under the trading name of the Commonwealth Services Delivery Agency in early 1997. Following the passage of the Commonwealth Services Delivery Agency Act 1997, the Centrelink brand name came into effect in late 1997. Offices were established nationally to manage services to people in need of social security payments.

In 1998, the government established the Centrepay payment system to allow recipients of Centrelink welfare payments to authorise automatic deductions from their welfare payments to pay for regular expenses.

On 1 July 2011, Centrelink, together with Medicare Australia, was integrated into the Department of Human Services as a result of the Human Services Act, 2011 (Cth), with the department retaining the brand name as part of its set of master programs.

In 2016, Concentrix, a business services company and subsidiary of U.S.-based SYNNEX Corporation, was one of the companies awarded a contract to operate call centres for Centrelink.

Another company awarded a call centre operating contract by Centrelink is Stellar, a subsidiary of the Nevada-registered U.S. company Stellar LLC.

Following the re-election of the Morrison Federal government in May 2019, the Department of Human Services was renamed Services Australia.

== Robodebt automated debt recovery scandal ==
=== Origin ===
In 2016, Centrelink began using a new automated technique (later found to be fatally flawed and unlawful) for reconciling welfare recipients' records against data from the Australian Taxation Office (ATO) in order to allegedly uncover fraud and overpayment, thus facilitating the scrape-back of these alleged debts from clients. In January 2017, it was reported that the scheme was touted to save the government $300m and consideration was also being given to recovery action against Centrelink clients on both the Aged Pension and the Disability Support Pension, which allegedly could have raised A$1 billion in revenue. In a process that had previously seen 20,000 debt recovery letters issued per year, this new automated data-matching technique, with less human oversight, saw that number increase to 169,000 letters during July–December 2016.

=== Injustice, trauma, and suicide ===
Critics and opponents of the automated process revealed and documented that the errors in the system, which became known colloquially as 'Robodebt' (a title later used officially), had coerced welfare recipients into paying either nonexistent debts, or debts that were vastly larger than what they actually may have owed, with the real amount often being a trivial sum of a few dollars or nothing at all. Some welfare recipients were required by Centrelink to make repayments for the fabricated debts while having to simultaneously engage in official reviews and legal challenges to the sham debt claims.

In some cases, the debts being pursued dated back further than the standard Australian Taxation Office and Centrelink mandates for Australian taxpayers and beneficiaries to retain their financial documentation (normally five years). In one related case, a Tasmanian pensioner was asked for financial records dating back almost 18 years.

The Robodebt scheme also normalised a Centrelink process that reversed the onus of proof that any claimed debt was factual; Centrelink did not require its staff to verify and prove that the information being used to raise the debt claims was accurate. Instead, the individual accused of the debt (often a bogus or wildly inflated figure) was required to prove they did not owe the funds, often with no access to their financial records that had frequently been lost, destroyed, or legitimately disposed of as authorised by the governmental policy requirements for record retention. Human interaction in the fact-checking and dispatch of the debt letters was extremely limited, with the process relying on a ubiquitous level of automation based on fatally flawed software algorithms (prompting the creation of the "Robodebt' moniker).

The injustice was further compounded by the ongoing failure of Centrelink call centres and office staff to respond and act within any reasonable time to investigate and correct the bogus debt accusations targeting so many of its clients, with Centrelink's telephone call centres having long become perennially notorious for either failing to be contactable by phone (with all lines often permanently engaged for days on end) or for automating the answering of calls and then keeping their clients "on hold" for extended periods, sometimes lasting for many hours, as well as subjecting these calls to frequent random hang-ups. Numerous allegations of callous and heavy-handed tactics by Centrelink and its contracted private debt collectors resulted in reports that some recipients had been psychologically traumatised and that there had been consequent suicides, including the tragic case of Corey Web, who had been vulnerable and struggling to repay a Robodebt when he took his own life in 2017.

=== Parliamentary investigation and legal challenges ===
In March 2017, the Robodebt program was the subject of a Senate committee inquiry, where the department was asked how many people had become deceased after receiving a letter under the debt recovery program. After the question was taken on notice, the department was asked again in a subsequent inquiry hearing, and it was again taken on notice. Despite numerous and widespread concerns being raised about Robodebt, the 2018 Australian federal budget indicated that the data matching scheme would be expanded further.

In February 2019, Legal Aid Victoria announced that they would challenge the method that Centrelink uses to calculate a person's income, with a spokesperson for Legal Aid stating that the calculation method used was "crude" and failed to take into account the variation in work periods and hours that many recipients had to juggle, thus rendering any income and consequent debt claim as false. Nine months later in November, the federal government settled the case and admitted that the figures produced by Robodebt's income averaging algorithm (for calculating people's income and consequent debt) were "not validly made" and were unlawful.

In September 2019, Gordon Legal announced their intention of filing a class-action suit challenging the legal foundations of the Robodebt scheme, and in June 2021 it was announced that the class action had been successful and Justice Bernard Murphy had approved a settlement that the ABC reported was worth at least $1.8 billion to the people wrongfully pursued as a result of Robodebt, and an additional amount of $8.4 million was owing to Gordon Legal for their work.

=== Robodebt finally scrapped ===
On 29 May 2020, Stuart Robert, Minister for Government Services announced that the "robo-debt" debt recovery scheme was to be scrapped by the Government, with 470,000 wrongly issued debts to be repaid in full. The total sum of the repayments is estimated to be A$721 million. Opposition Government Services spokesperson Bill Shorten criticised the Government's lack of apology for the scheme, citing the psychological harm to many of those issued with debt recovery notices.

=== Royal Commission ===
The federal Labor Party returned to power after the May 2022 federal elections, and established a Royal Commission to investigate. In its final report of 7 July 2023, the commission denounced the Robodebt scheme as both fundamentally flawed and unlawful, making adverse findings against the ministers responsible for its oversight as well as a number of senior public service officials, all of whose actions the commission found to be reprehensible.

== See also ==
- Social security in Australia
- Job Network
