= Hearing Australia =

Government-funded hearing aid dispensing company in Australia

- Formation: 1947; 79 years ago
- Type: Statutory authority
- Services: Assisted hearing solutions
- Methods: Hearing Australia centres
- Managing Director: Eron Plumb
- Chief Operating Officer: Gina Mavrias
- Chair of the Board of Directors: Elizabeth Crouch AM
- Parent organisation: Services Australia
- Revenue: A$285 million (2024 FY)
- Expenses: A$278 million (2024 FY)
- Website: https://hearing.com.au
- Formerly called: Australian Hearing

Hearing Australia is a statutory authority constituted under the Australian Hearing Services Act 1991.

Hearing Australia is the largest provider of government-funded hearing services in Australia, with over 180 permanent locations and hundreds of visiting sites across Australia. They specialise in hearing assessment and rehabilitation of children under the age of 26, and adults with complex hearing needs. They also deliver extensive hearing services to Aboriginal and Torres’s Strait Islander communities through their First Nations Services Unit.

Hearing Australia’s research division, the National Acoustic Laboratories, broadly focuses its research into the areas of hearing assessment, hearing loss prevention, hearing rehabilitation devices, and hearing rehabilitation procedures.

Hearing Australia was voted Most Trusted Hearing Services Provider by Reader’s Digest for 6 consecutive years from 2021-2026.

== History ==
Hearing Australia is the current incarnation of the Acoustic Research Laboratory that was set up in 1942. Its initial purpose was the investigation of noise on behalf of the Australian Military during World War II. After the war it helped those children whose hearing was affected by earlier rubella outbreaks.

The Commonwealth Department of Health (now the Department of Health, Disability and Ageing) took over the Laboratory and was renamed the Commonwealth Acoustic Laboratories, with the aim of providing hearing services for children and veterans. It was in 1973 renamed the National Acoustic Laboratories.

The Australian Hearing Services Act 1991 established it as Australian Hearing Services, a Commonwealth Government statutory authority. The name National Acoustic Laboratories was retained for its research division. When the Department of Human Services was formed in 2004, the agency known as Australian Hearing was moved into its portfolio. In 2020, they rebranded from Australian Hearing to Hearing Australia.

== Eligibility criteria ==
Anyone can attend Hearing Australia, as they see both private and government funded clients. Funded services are available for clients who meet eligibility criteria through the Hearing Services Program Voucher and Community Services Obligation (CSO) Schemes, the National Disability Insurance Scheme, the Department of Veteran Affairs, and private health insurance.

Voucher Scheme

To be eligible for the Voucher program, one must be an Australian citizen or permanent resident, and meet one of the following criteria:

- Holders of Pensioner concession cards, or their dependants
- Recipients of a sickness allowance from Centrelink, or their dependants
- Department of Veterans' Affairs Gold Repatriation Health Card holders, or their dependants
- Department of Veterans' Affairs White Repatriation Health Card holders where hearing loss is specified, or their dependants
- Australian Defence Force personnel

Participants of the Voucher program are eligible for free audiological care including hearing assessments, hearing loss management, tinnitus assessment and counselling, and communication training. Participants who meet the minimum hearing loss criteria are also eligible for fully-subsidised entry-level hearing aids every 5 years (with option to contribute out of pocket for higher level technology), and subsidised hearing aid maintenance.

Community Service Obligation

Hearing Australia is the sole provider of the government-funded Community Service Obligation (CSO) program, which provides specialist hearing services for paediatric and eligible adult clients. The CSO program is delivered by Specialist Audiologists with additional training in paediatric and complex adult audiology.

To be eligible for the CSO program, one must be an Australian citizen or permanent resident, and meet one of the following criteria:

- Under 26 years of age with a permanent or long-term hearing loss
- Aboriginal and Torres Strait Islander peoples over 50 years of age or participating in a Community Development Employment Project (CDEP)
- Eligible for the voucher program (see above) AND have an implantable hearing device (cochlear implant or bone conduction implant)
- Eligible for the voucher program (see above) AND have an average hearing loss of 80dBHL or above in the better hearing ear
- Eligible for the voucher program (see above) AND have additional disabilities affecting communication, including vision loss

Participants of the CSO program are eligible for free audiological assessment and management with Specialist Audiologists, high-level hearing aid technology every 4-5 years, remote microphone technology, communication training programs, and subsidised device maintenance.
