= Gordon de Brouwer =

Australian public servant

Dr Gordon de Brouwer AO PSM

Australian Public Service Commissioner
- In office 11 May 2023 – 13 February 2026
- Preceded by: Peter Woolcott
- Succeeded by: Dr Subho Banerjee (interim); Jacqui Curtis (from 9 June 2026)

Secretary for Public Sector Reform
- In office 22 June 2022 – 10 May 2023
- Preceded by: Position Established
- Succeeded by: Position Disestablished

Secretary of the Department of the Environment
- In office September 2013 – 19 July 2016
- Preceded by: Paul Grimes (as Secretary of the Department of Sustainability, Environment, Water, Population and Communities)
- Succeeded by: Himself

Secretary of the Department of the Environment and Energy
- In office 19 July 2016 – 17 September 2017
- Preceded by: Himself
- Succeeded by: Finn Pratt

Personal details
- Born: Gordon John de Brouwer
- Education: Australian National University; University of Melbourne
- Occupation: Public servant

Dr Gordon John de Brouwer is a senior Australian public servant who is currently Chancellor of the Australian National University. He served as Australian Public Service Commissioner from 11 May 2023 until 13 February 2026. Prior to this, he was the Secretary for Public Sector Reform from 2022 to 2023, and previously Secretary of the Department of the Environment and Energy from 2016 to 2017.

== Career ==
=== Academia ===
De Brouwer was Professor of Economics in the Crawford School of Public Policy at the Australian National University (ANU), from January 2000 to March 2004. This included a period as Executive Director of the Australia-Japan Research Centre and Director of the School's Research Committee. De Brouwer was also a member of the University's research program on Japan's Economy and Government and on Korea's Economy and Government.

De Brouwer was an adjunct professor with the ANU throughout his time in the public service before his 2026 appointment as the Chancellor of ANU. He replaced Julie Bishop following her resignation from the chancellorship in May 2026.

=== Public service ===
De Brouwer was appointed Secretary of the Department of the Environment in September 2013 after previously serving in the Department of Prime Minister and Cabinet.

De Brouwer was the Associate Secretary in the Domestic Policy Group at the Department of the Prime Minister and Cabinet under the Rudd Government. In this position, de Brouwer provided departmental and cross-government policy advice to the Prime Minister on domestic policy and G20 matters and was also the senior official representing Australia’s interests in the G20. De Brouwer played a key role in the development of Australia's $42 billion economic stimulus package. Former secretary of the Department of the Prime Minister and Cabinet, Terry Moran, stated in his witness statement to the Home Insulation Royal Commission that de Brouwer was given primary responsibility for devising environmental initiatives and presenting them to Cabinet, including the Energy Efficient Homes Package that included the Home Insulation Program that resulted in the deaths of four installers. de Brouwer also led the Australian delegation to the 2009 United Nations Climate Change Conference. de Brouwer was appointed as Australia's G20 sherpa by Kevin Rudd. It was reported in leaked diplomatic cables that De Brouwer lamented to his contacts in the US Embassy that PM&C foreign policy staff have been run ragged answering the PM's (Rudd's) queries and supporting his interaction with foreign officials.

De Brouwer became the President of the Institute of Public Administration (IPAA) ACT Division on 9 June 2016 until his retirement as Secretary, then took on the role as National President of IPAA in September 2019.

De Brouwer was appointed Secretary for Public Sector Reform for a 2-year term on 22 June 2022 under Katy Gallagher as Minister for the Public Service. However, less than a year later, on 11 May 2023 he was appointed Australian Public Service Commissioner.

== Awards and honours ==
De Brouwer studied in Japan in 1987–89 and 1994 with support from the Monbusho and Japan Foundation scholarships.

De Brouwer was awarded a Public Service Medal in 2011 for outstanding public service in the development of international economic policy, particularly in the formulation of the Australian Government's agenda to establish the G20 as the pre-eminent global economic forum.

In 2015, de Brouwer was awarded the Legion of Honour by the French Government.

In 2017, de Brouwer was awarded a National Fellowship of the Institute of Public Administration Australia.

He was appointed an Officer of the Order of Australia in the 2026 King's Birthday Honours in recognition of "distinguished service to public administration, policy and reform, to diversity, to environmental conservation, and to education".

Government offices
Preceded by Paul Grimes as Secretary of the Department of Sustainability, Environment, Water, Population and Communities	Secretary of the Department of the Environment; 2013–2016	Succeeded by Himself as Secretary of the Department of the Environment and Energy
Preceded by Himself as Secretary of the Department of the Environment	Secretary of the Department of the Environment and Energy; 2016–2017	Succeeded by Finn Pratt
