= Finn Pratt =

Australian public servant

Finn Pratt AO PSM

Chief Executive Officer of Centrelink
- In office 2008–2009

Secretary of the Department of Human Services
- In office 2009–2011

Secretary of the Department of Families, Housing, Community Services and Indigenous Affairs
- In office 2011 – 18 September 2013

Secretary of the Department of Social Services
- In office 18 September 2013 – 17 September 2017

Secretary of the Department of the Environment and Energy
- In office 18 September 2017 – 11 October 2019

Personal details
- Born: 1960
- Education: Australian National University (BA)
- Occupation: Public servant

Finn Axel Pratt AO PSM (born 1960) is a retired senior Australian public servant. He was most recently Secretary of the Department of the Environment and Energy.

== Life and career ==
Pratt has a Bachelor of Arts from the Australian National University.

He was appointed Chief Executive Officer of Centrelink in September 2008. Finn Pratt was promoted to the role of Secretary of the Department of Human Services in 2009.

In 2011, Pratt moved into the position of Secretary of the Department of Families, Housing, Community Services and Indigenous Affairs.

In 2013 he was appointed Secretary of the Department of Social Services.

On 7 September 2017, the Prime Minister Malcolm Turnbull announced Pratt's appointment as Secretary of the Department of the Environment and Energy, commencing 18 September [4].

Pratt retired from office on 11 October 2019 following a 36 year career in the Australian Public Service.

== Robodebt Royal Commission ==
Pratt was one of the most senior public servants to appear before the Royal Commission into the Robodebt Scheme. His evidence included:

- That he signed a letter to the Ombudsman saying his department was satisfied it was operating legally because he "trusted" the advice his officials provided
- That Robodebt scheme was "one headache which wasn't my headache" (even though he was the head of the policy department responsible, including signing said letter to the Ombudsman)
- That he did not believe he had asked how the scheme worked

The Royal Commission reported that Pratt failed to make inquiries about the legality of Robodebt, and that as Secretary he should have. Further, in advising the Ombudsman in 2017 that the scheme was operating legally, Pratt effectively misled the Ombudsman investigation. The Royal Commission also reported that Pratt specifically signed a letter to the Commonwealth Ombudsman in 2017 saying the scheme was lawful, despite not seeing any legal or policy advice or knowing how it worked. Pratt admitted to the Royal Commission that he did not ask for legal advice before making the recommendation. Specifically, the Royal Commission report states:

It can be readily accepted that as secretary of DSS Mr Pratt was entitled to rely on the expertise of DSS staff in developing draft correspondence for him to sign. However, that does not absolve Mr Pratt of any responsibility to make inquiry before making a public, positive assertion about the lawfulness of an entire Scheme. His Department held legal advice about the Scheme which demonstrated it was unlawful. Mr Pratt was not aware of that advice, but he did not take any steps to inquire about that prior to asserting the legality of the Scheme. He failed to make inquiries to satisfy himself that the representation made with respect to the legality of the Scheme in the letter he signed was correct.

The effect of Mr Pratt’s letter to the Ombudsman was significant. The Ombudsman placed substantial weight on Mr Pratt’s assurance that DSS was satisfied that the Scheme was operating in line with legislative requirements. Both DHS and DSS continued to cite the Ombudsman’s report, including Mr Pratt’s statement as to the Scheme’s meeting legislative requirements, to defend the Scheme. This is outlined in further detail in the chapter – The Commonwealth Ombudsman.

== Awards ==
Pratt was awarded a Public Service Medal in January 2008 for outstanding public service in the development and implementation of significant and innovative reforms to public employment services and workplace relations in Australia. In June 2015, Pratt was appointed an Officer of the Order of Australia for his work on the National Disability Insurance Scheme.

Government offices
| Preceded by Jeff Whalan | Chief Executive Officer of Centrelink; 2008–2009 | Succeeded by Carolyn Hogg |
| Preceded by Helen Williams | Secretary of the Department of Human Services; 2009–2011 | Succeeded by Kathryn Campbell |
| Preceded by Jeff Harmer | Secretary of the Department of Families, Housing, Community Services and Indigenous Affairs; 2011–2013 | Succeeded by Himself as Secretary of the Department of Social Services |
| Preceded by Jeff Harmer | Secretary of the Department of Families, Housing, Community Services and Indigenous Affairs; 2011–2013 | Succeeded by Ian Watt as Secretary of the Department of the Prime Minister and Cabinet |
| Preceded by Himself as Secretary of the Department of Families, Housing, Community Services and Indigenous Affairs | Secretary of the Department of Social Services; 2013–2017 | Succeeded by Kathryn Campbell |
| Preceded by Gordon de Brouwer | Secretary of the Department of the Environment and Energy; 2017–2019 | Succeeded by David Fredericks |
