= 2018 Australian federal budget =

Australian federal budget 2018
- Submitted: 8 May 2018
- Submitted by: Turnbull government
- Submitted to: House of Representatives
- Country: Australia
- Parliament: 45th
- Party: Liberal/National Coalition
- Treasurer: Scott Morrison
- Total revenue: A$473.7 billion
- Total expenditures: A$484.6 billion
- Tax cuts: A$13.4 billion (over 4 years)
- Deficit: A$14.5 billion
- Website: budget.gov.au

The 2018 Australian federal budget was the federal budget to fund government services and operations for the 2018–19 financial year. The budget was presented to the House of Representatives by Treasurer Scott Morrison on 8 May 2018. It was the fifth budget to be handed down by the Liberal/National Coalition since its election to government at the 2013 federal election, and the third and final budget to be handed down by Morrison and the Turnbull government.

== Background ==
In mid-April, Acting Prime Minister Michael McCormack described Treasurer Scott Morrison as "Santa Claus" in an interview with the Daily Telegraph, also hinting that there would be spending on transport infrastructure. Morrison stated that the $5 billion Melbourne Airport rail link would be part of this budget. There has been an increase in revenue recently due to stronger than expected commodity prices and an increase in employment. The budget was described as effectively a pre-election budget for the 2019 federal election. Polling prior to the budget revealed that the public thought the most important issues for the government to address were the cost of living and improving health infrastructure. Student newspapers were not invited to the 2018 budget lockup.

== Forecasting ==
A Deloitte Access report issued in April 2018 found that total revenue was $7.6 billion more than had been forecast in December 2017.

== Income taxes ==
The budget proposes to introduce a Low and Middle Income Tax Offset (LMITO) of $530, from July 2018. This offset will not be reflected in adjustments to PAYG rates, which would translate to a PAYG cut of about $10 a week for low to middle income earners, but will be applied when the tax returns are lodged. The LMITO will not be a refundable offset. From July 2022, the 32.5% tax bracket is to raise from $37,000 to $41,000. From July 2024, the 37% tax bracket (which currently applies to incomes between $87,000 and $180,000) is to be abolished, and the 32.5% tax bracket is to apply to incomes between $41,000 and $200,000.

The 0.5% increase in the Medicare levy from 1 July 2019, announced in the 2017 budget, has been abandoned, and the funding of the National Disability Insurance Scheme of $8 billion is now to be funded out of general revenue.

The government still wanted to reduce the corporate income tax rate from 30% to 25% for all companies by 2026/27. From 1 July 2019, businesses with a turnover of less than $50 million received a 2.5% tax break to 27.5%.

== Social welfare ==
The Social Welfare Debt Recovery scheme (dubbed robo-debt by the media) will be extended for another three years, until 2022, and is expected to recover $300 million from current and former Centrelink customers. The Commonwealth will seek the power to automatically deduct state fines from welfare payments. The rules for suspending the disability support pension for prisoners and people awaiting trial will be changed from allowing a suspension period of two years to allowing a suspension period of 13 weeks.

There is to be no increase in the Newstart Allowance, and the Department of Human Services was targeted with further 1,200 job cuts.

Spending on social security was $6.3b less than forecast in this budget.

== Programs and expenditure ==
=== Aged care ===
Home care packages will be increased by 14,000 places. It has been noted that this measure will not meet demand in the sector.

=== Agriculture ===
Sea imports will be subject to a levy to help the government identify and respond to biosecurity threats. The macadamia levy has been increased to raise funds to combat the Varroa jacobsoni mite in Queensland, and the mushroom and honey levies have been decreased.

=== Arts ===
The funding freeze of the ABC continued while SBS received an additional $14.6 million. $50 million will be allocated to the construction of a Captain Cook memorial at Kurnell commemorating the 250th anniversary of Captain Cook's landing.

=== ASIC ===
Australian Securities &Investments Commission was given $11 million in the budget to cover the costs of the Royal Commission into Misconduct in the Banking, Superannuation and Financial Services Industry, but lost $28 million of funding and 30 staff.

=== Cash transactions ===
A limit of $10,000 was imposed on cash transactions to counter the black economy. While amnesties were recommended by a parliamentary committee, these were not adopted by the government.

=== Illicit tobacco ===
A four-year program targeting illicit tobacco is expected to be announced, with import permits required from 1 July 2019 for all imports of tobacco except those purchased duty free.

=== Infrastructure ===
An infrastructure spend of $24.5 billion in New South Wales, Victoria and South Australia was budgeted for.

=== National School Chaplaincy Programme ===
The National School Chaplaincy Programme has been extended for four years with funding of $247 million.

=== Pharmaceutical Benefits Scheme ===
Additional medicines will be added to the Pharmaceutical Benefits Scheme, for the treatment of breast cancer, refractory multiple myeloma, and relapsing-remitting multiple sclerosis. Additionally, pre-exposure prophylaxis for HIV/AIDS will be added to the PBS.

=== Self-managed superannuation auditing ===
The requirement for self-managed superannuation to be audited annually has been relaxed to allow auditing to occur once every three years.

=== Space agency ===
$50 million will be allocated to the creation of a space agency.

=== Superannuation consolidation ===
Fund exit fees were banned. The Australian Taxation Office was given powers to consolidate superannuation from a person's inactive accounts, sending it to their active account. Superannuation accounts that have had no contributions for over 13 months and that have a balance of under $6,000 will be subject to this scheme from 1 July 2019.

=== Women's Budget ===
An analysis of how the budget measures will affect women has concluded that the taper effect will create a disincentive to work. A statement on women's economic security will be unveiled by Kelly O'Dwyer in spring 2018.

== Debt and deficit ==
The Budget deficit for 2017/18 is expected to be $18.2 billion, falling to $14.5 billion in 2018/19. The Budget is expected to return to a surplus of $2.2 billion in 2019/20, and increasing to $16.6 billion in 2021/22.

The government's debt level is forecast to be $629 billion in 2019/20.

== Opposition and crossbench response ==
Upfront fees for up to 100,000 TAFE students will be scrapped.

The Greens party has stated that they will refuse to pass the tax cuts advocated by either major party, describing them as a "bribe".

== Reception ==
In response to an anticipated tax cut, the hashtag #keepmytendollars trended on social media.

Some people have criticized the New tax System with Australians earning between $41,000 and $200,000 paying the same tax as moving away from a progressive taxation system. Labor has asked for the potential costs from scrapping the 37% tax bracket, but Morrison has declined to release the cost modelling.

Analysis of the budget and budget reply by Australian National University researchers shows that neither proposed budget adequately addresses bracket creep.

This budget marks the fifth consecutive year that Australia's foreign aid budget has been cut.

The second stage of the Coalition's company tax cuts for big business was rejected by the Senate on 22 August 2018.

== See also ==
- Australian government debt
- Economy of Australia
- Taxation in Australia
