= Child Support Agency (Australia) =

Australian government agency

The Child Support Agency (CSA) was an Australian Government organisation which was established in 1988 to administer the assessment and collection of child support under the Australian Government's Child Support Scheme.

In 2011, the Child Support Agency ceased to exist when Child Support became one of the Master Programs of the Australian Government Services Australia. It is no longer a government agency as it is authorised or empowered by the Australian Parliament in current legislation to assess, register or collect child support liabilities.

== Overview ==
The CSA was responsible for administering the Child Support (Assessment) Act 1989 which sets out the calculation of child support, based on a formula encompassing the income of the parent/s, care arrangements of the children, ages of the children, other dependants and a number of other factors; and the Child Support (Registration and Collection Act) 1988 regarding to the transfer and collection of the calculated payments, including enforcement of unpaid amounts.

The CSA had approximately 1.5 million customers and employs over 4,000 staff. The system costs 3.4 billion dollars per annum to administer.

While it was one of the most complained about Australian Government agencies, the Australian Child Support Agency was recognized as a world leader in terms of effectiveness and efficiency at administering child support.

The standard formula calculated the majority of the 1.5 million cases administered, the formula is set up in such a way that a new amount is generally calculated on an annual basis as incomes change and children grow older, or if there are any changes to the care arrangements, birth of new children and so on.

In some circumstances parents could make their own agreements as to what child support was paid. There were also provisions for agency review of individual formula assessments in special circumstances. The courts could also set amounts payable should either or both parents seek a court ruling on the matter.

Transfer of payments could be made independently of the agency (approximately 46% of cases) or via the agency as either a voluntary arrangement, or through enforcement. Voluntary payments could be made through payroll deductions, deductions from welfare payments, internet transfers or payment at Australia Post outlets.

Under the Child Support Agency, enforcement could range from the involuntary garnishee from salary and bank accounts, to litigation and restrictions on overseas travel until payment has been made.

Child support agency can stop you from travelling if you fail to pay

== History and evolution of the scheme ==
The CSA was established as part of the Australian Taxation Office (ATO) in 1988 to administer the Child Support Scheme.

Prior to 1988, child maintenance was managed through the court system, this scheme proved costly to determine amounts and ineffectual in enforcing payment. In 1986, the Australian Government proposed reforms to child support. The proposed reforms were:

- A formula to determine the level of child maintenance payable
- Enforcement of maintenance through the Australian Taxation Office (ATO)
- An administrative process to apply the formula with a right of appeal to the courts

These reforms were implemented through two Acts of Parliament - the Child Support (Registration and Collection Act) 1988 and the Child Support (Assessment) Act 1989.

In July 2000, a reciprocal agreement on child support was enacted between Australia and New Zealand. If the custodial parent lives in Australia and the paying parent lives in New Zealand, then the CSA can ask its New Zealand counterpart, Inland Revenue Child Support (IRCS), to collect child support and pursue debt collection on its behalf. Likewise, if the custodial parent lives in New Zealand and the paying parent in Australia, then IRCS can ask the CSA to collect child support and pursue debt collection. The agreement also allows income information to be shared between two agencies to ensure the correct amount of child support is paid.

In February 2006, the Australian Government announced major reforms to the Child Support Formula. These reforms were introduced in stages over four years, the first major changes to the Child Support Formula took effect from 1 July 2008.

These changes recognized more diverse arrangements for care of children, began treating the incomes of both custodial and non-custodial parents more equitably, increased entitlements for teenage children, and made special provisions for the three years immediately after separation while parents re-established themselves financially.

The changes were not retrospective.

In 2011, Child Support became one of the Master Programs of the Australian Government Services Australia. It no longer exists and child support is now administered by the Services Australia Child Support.

== Criticism ==
Child support is a divisive issue for many people. While the scheme has enjoyed bipartisan support from successive governments since 1988, lobby groups for those who receive child support as well as those who pay have complained about perceived shortfalls of the scheme.

Resident parent groups have complained that the agency remains ineffective against non-compliance from self-employed parents in particular (a group to whom many administrative enforcement procedures such as salary garnishees are not possible), while many paying parent groups complain that they are treated unfairly. In particular a recent program undertaken by the agency reconciled a number of income estimates from paying parents that were up to ten years old, creating large debts that were not appealable under any existing arrangements (courts only having jurisdiction for seven years of retrospectivity.)

Further criticism of CSA is the use of number of nights as a way to determine how much child support should be paid to the primary caregiver – though in certain circumstances, hours of care can be used if significant enough. The major criticism is that this method has been used as a loop-hole by the primary carer to increase the level of payment they receive. A typical scenario might be when a primary carer moves a long distance away from the other parent, creating barriers to access such as distance and increased cost. The Child Support Agency does not have the capacity to incorporate these nuances when determining a basic assessment, therefore adversely penalising the non primary caregiver. However this can be addressed through the Agency's Change of Assessment process depending on how much of the paying party's adjusted taxable income is spent on contacting the child.

== See also ==
- Child support
- Department of Families, Community Services and Indigenous Affairs
- Services Australia
- Australian family law
- Family Court of Australia
- Men's Rights
