= Public Sector Management Program =

The Public Sector Management Program in Australia is a cooperative tertiary management learning approach used by the State and Territory Governments in cooperation with the Australian Federal Government.

The PSMP is a four-module management training program undertaken by Public Service Managers who come from either Local, State or Federal Public Service positions. It is managed within each Australian State and the final qualification earned was a Graduate Certificate in Public Sector Management from Flinders University, SA. The course was organised by the Queensland University of Technology (QUT) from 2011 to 2014 and QUT has been given the right to run the course again from 2015 to 2019.

Graduates of the PSMP are eligible for credit into further post-graduate programs at the Graduate Diploma, Masters, Masters (Honours) and Doctorate level.
