= Department of the Environment and Energy =

Australian government department, 2016–2020

Department overview
- Formed: 19 July 2016
- Preceding Department: Department of the Environment
- Dissolved: 1 February 2020
- Superseding agencies: Department of Agriculture, Water and the Environment; Department of Industry, Science, Energy and Resources
- Jurisdiction: Commonwealth of Australia
- Headquarters: John Gorton Building, King Edward Terrace, Parkes ACT 2600, Canberra, Australia
- Ministers responsible: Sussan Ley, Minister for the Environment; Angus Taylor, Minister for Energy and Emissions Reduction
- Department executive: Finn Pratt, Secretary
- Website: www.environment.gov.au

The Department of the Environment and Energy (DEE) was an Australian government department in existence between 2016 and 2020.

The department was responsible for matters including environment protection and conservation of biodiversity as well as energy policy. It was established in July 2016 by the Turnbull government after the 2016 federal election. Following the appointment of Scott Morrison as Prime Minister, Josh Frydenberg was elevated to Treasurer of Australia, whereby Frydenberg's previous ministerial positions were separated, with Melissa Price as Minister of the Environment and Angus Taylor as Minister for Energy. Price was reshuffled from her position in 2019, and was replaced by Sussan Ley.

By an administrative order issued on 5 December 2019 and effective from 1 February 2020, the environment functions of the department were merged with all functions of the Department of Agriculture, to form the Department of Agriculture, Water and the Environment. The department's energy functions were transferred to the Department of Industry, Science, Energy and Resources.

== Scope ==
The Administrative Arrangements Orders listed the department's responsibilities as follows:

- Administration of the Australian Antarctic Territory, and the Territory of Heard Island and McDonald Islands
- Air quality
- Climate change adaptation strategy and co-ordination
- Community and household climate action
- Co-ordination of climate change science activities
- Co-ordination of sustainable communities policy
- Development and co-ordination of domestic climate change policy
- Energy efficiency
- Energy policy
- Environment protection and conservation of biodiversity
- Environmental information and research
- Environmental water use and resources relating to the Commonwealth Environmental Water Holder
- Greenhouse emissions and energy consumption reporting
- Greenhouse gas abatement programs
- Industrial energy efficiency
- Ionospheric prediction
- Land contamination
- Meteorology
- National energy market, including electricity and gas
- National fuel quality standards
- Natural, built and cultural heritage
- Renewable energy
- Renewable energy target policy, regulation and co-ordination
- Renewable energy technology development
- Urban environment

== Structure ==
The head of the department was its Secretary, Finn Pratt AO PSM, responsible to the Minister for the Environment and Energy, the Hon. Melissa Price MP until 2019, and then the Hon. Sussan Ley MP. The department was staffed by individuals from the Australian Public Service.

== Online databases and apps ==
As of 2019, the DEE website also hosted the Australasian Underwater Cultural Heritage Database (AUCHD), a searchable online database containing data about shipwrecks, aircraft and other cultural heritage artefacts which are or have been underwater. The AUCHD also served as the register of protected underwater cultural heritage for the Underwater Cultural Heritage Act 2018 (the UCH Act), providing a means whereby the public could submit notifications and permit applications required under the Act.

The website also hosted a number of other databases and applications in the areas of biodiversity, climate change, heritage, the Environment Protection and Biodiversity Conservation Act 1999 (EPBC Act), environmental protection, land and water, as well as photo galleries of Australian plants, and environmental and cultural heritage subjects.

== See also ==
- Director of National Parks
- Parks Australia
- Great Barrier Reef Marine Park Authority
- Waste management in Australia
