= Australian Public Service Commission =

Statutory agency

Statutory agency overview
- Formed: 1999
- Preceding Statutory agency: Public Service Merit Protection Commission
- Jurisdiction: Commonwealth of Australia
- Headquarters: Parkes, Canberra, Australian Capital Territory
- Employees: 237 (at June 2016)
- Annual budget: A$23 million (2008–2009)
- Minister responsible: Katy Gallagher, Minister for the Public Service
- Statutory agency executives: Gordon de Brouwer, Australian Public Service Commissioner; Linda Waugh, Merit Protection Commissioner
- Parent department: Department of the Prime Minister and Cabinet
- Key document: Public Service Act, 1999 (Cth)
- Website: www.apsc.gov.au

The Australian Public Service Commission (APSC) is a statutory agency of the Australian Government, within the Department of the Prime Minister and Cabinet, that acts to ensure the organisational and workforce capability to meet future needs and sustainability of the Australian Public Service (APS), that comprises approximately 160,000 people, or 0.8% of the Australian workforce.

The Commission was established pursuant to the Public Service Act 1999 and is led by the Australian Public Service Commissioner.

Dr Gordon de Brouwer PSM was appointed Commissioner on 11 May 2023, taking over from Peter Woolcott AO. The Merit Protection Commissioner is Linda Waugh.

Both Commissioners work closely with the Minister Assisting the Prime Minister for the Public Service, currently Katy Gallagher. APSC employs around 200 staff, with offices in Canberra and Sydney.

The Commissioner reports annually to Australian Parliament on the state of the APS, including changes in the environment and infrastructure of the APS and emerging issues.

== Functions ==
The vision of the Commission is to lead and shape a unified and high-performing Australian Public Service (APS). The Commission is responsible for providing advice to the Government on the APS; providing advice on strategic people management; supporting the implementation of Government policy; contributing to effective APS leadership and evaluating and reporting on the performance of the APS.

To this end, the Commission performs the following functions:

- evaluates the extent to which agencies incorporate and uphold the values of the APS
- evaluates the adequacy of systems and procedures in agencies for ensuring compliance with the APS Code of Conduct
- promotes the APS Values and Code of Conduct
- develops, promotes, reviews and evaluates APS employment policies and practices
- facilitates continuous improvement in people management throughout the APS
- coordinates and supports APS-wide training and career development
- contributes to and fosters leadership in the APS
- provides advice and assistance on public service matters to agencies on request
- provides independent external review of actions by the Merit Protection Commissioner.

The systems and special reviews are undertaken at the direction of the Prime Minister.

== See also ==
- Public Sector Management Program, an accredited standardised formal nationwide management training programme
