= Services Australia =

Federal welfare agency of the Australian Government

Agency overview
- Formed: 26 May 2019
- Preceding agencies: Department of Human Services; Department of Social Security
- Jurisdiction: Australia
- Headquarters: Forrest, Australian Capital Territory
- Employees: 34,294 (at September 2021)
- Minister responsible: Katy Gallagher, Minister for Government Services
- Agency executive: David Hazlehurst, Chief Executive Officer
- Parent department: Department of Finance
- Child agencies: Medicare; Centrelink; Hearing Australia; Child Support Agency
- Website: servicesaustralia.gov.au
- Agency ID: NAA CA 9610

Services Australia is a commonwealth agency of the Australian federal government responsible for delivering a range of welfare, health, child support and other financial services to eligible Australian residents. The agency delivers social services through government programs like Centrelink, Medicare, the PBS, and the Child Support Agency. Eligible Australian citizens and permanent residents can access most services through a digital myGov account available online or through an app.

The head of the agency is the chief executive officer, currently David Hazlehurst, who is responsible to the minister for government services, currently Katy Gallagher. In July 2025, Services Australia was reshuffled into the Finance portfolio.

== History ==
The Department of Human Services (now Services Australia) was created on 26 October 2004 as part of the Australian Government's Finance and Administration portfolio. At the time of its creation, it incorporated the Child Support Agency and CRS Australia. Later, the Human Services Legislation Amendment Act 2011 integrated Centrelink and Medicare into the structure.

The secretary at the department's establishment in 2004 was Patricia Scott. Helen Williams was appointed secretary of the department in 2007. Finn Pratt succeeded Williams in September 2009 after her retirement from the public service.

The department was renamed "Services Australia" and made an Executive Agency in machinery of government changes made by Prime Minister Scott Morrison on 29 May 2019, following the 2019 federal election.

The agency was formed by way of an administrative order announced on 26 May 2019, with the order coming into effect from 1 February 2020. As a result of this change, the previous secretary, Renée Leon was removed from her role. From 1 February 2020, the Department of Human Services began operating under the Services Australia branding with Amanda Cattermole beginning as the agency's acting secretary until her role was discontinued.

In 2020, Services Australia signed a $460,000 contract with controversial Israeli digital intelligence company Cellebrite, to use its spyware in fraud investigations. The contract was extended in August 2021, bringing the total value to $1.2 million. Services Australia has refused to state which programs it used the technology on to investigate suspected fraud.

Services Australia is responsible for the operation of the Medicare Statistics Reporting Service Portal. On 24 September 2026, Anthony Albanese announced OpenAI had breached the portal in the Medicare Statistics Reporting Service Portal attack.

== Responsibilities ==
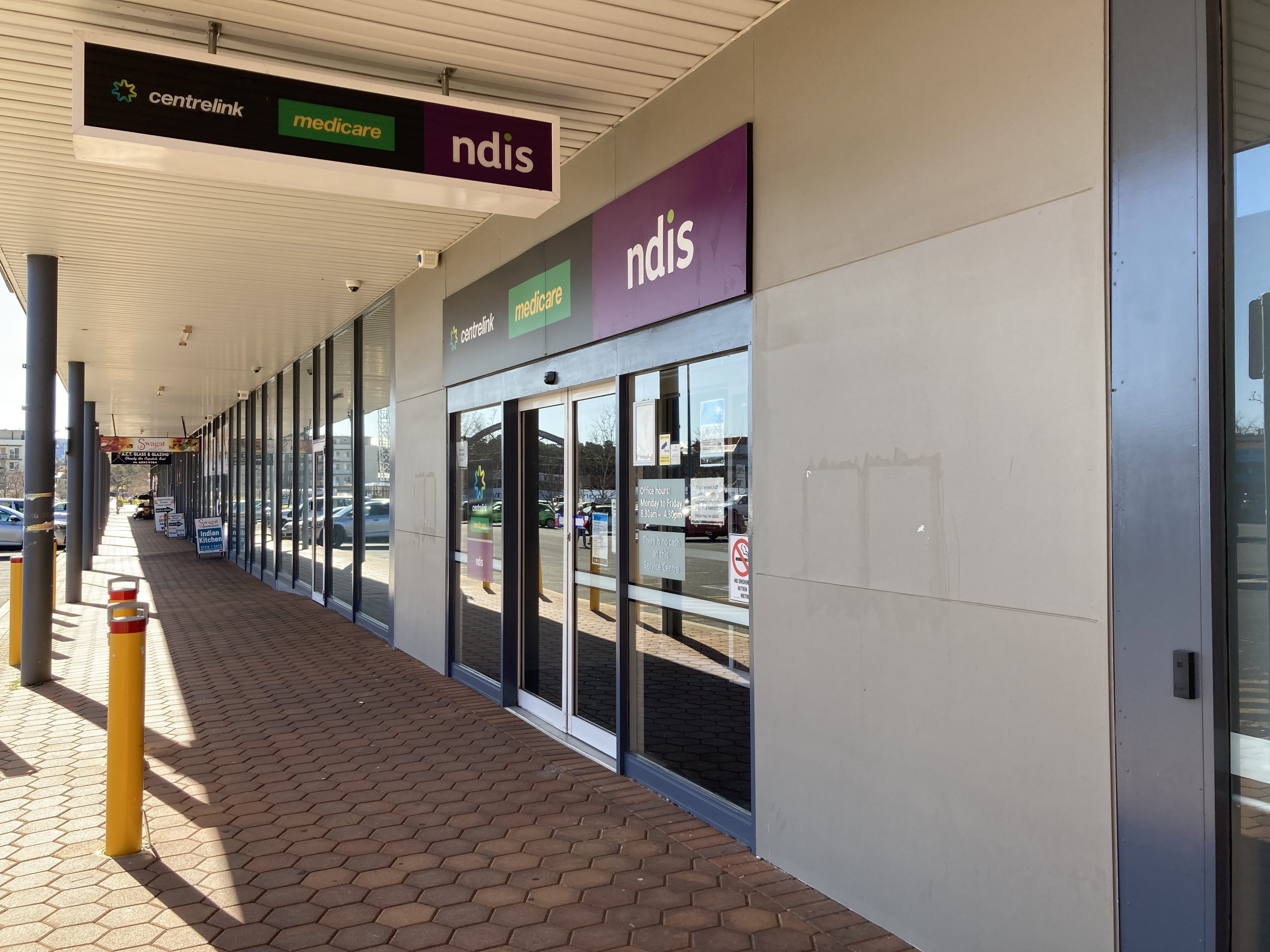
The entrance to a Services Australia service centre in Canberra

According to the Administrative Arrangements Order of 29 May 2019, Services Australia is responsible for administering the following services as dictated by their legislation:

- Centrelink – Human Services (Centrelink) Act 1997
- Medicare – Human Services (Medicare) Act 1973
- Child Support

Services Australia also shares responsibility for the myGov platform with the Australian Taxation Office and Digital Transformation Agency.

As part of the administration of these services, Services Australia operates a number of face-to-face service centres across Australia, as well as myGov centres in major cities. In 13 locations across Tasmania, both state and federal services can be accessed through Service Tasmania centres.

== See also ==
- List of Australian Government entities
- Minister for Government Services
- OpenAI–HuggingFace incident#Medicare Statistics Reporting Service Portal attack
