= Electoral results for the Division of Stirling =

Australian division election results

This is a list of electoral results for the Division of Stirling in Australian federal elections from the division's creation in 1955 until 2019. The division was abolished in 2022.

== Members ==
Member	Party	Term
Harry Webb	Labor	1955–1958
Doug Cash	Liberal	1958–1961
Harry Webb	Labor	1961–1972
Ian Viner	Liberal	1972–1983
Ron Edwards	Labor	1983–1993
Eoin Cameron	Liberal	1993–1998
Jann McFarlane	Labor	1998–2004
Michael Keenan	Liberal	2004–2019
Vince Connelly	Liberal	2019–2022

== Election results ==
=== Elections in the 2010s ===
==== 2019 ====
2019 Australian federal election: Stirling
Party	Candidate	Votes	%	±%
Liberal	Vince Connelly	40,757	46.97	−2.48
Labor	Melita Markey	27,623	31.83	−0.34
Greens	Judith Cullity	10,439	12.03	+0.35
One Nation	Angus Young	3,129	3.61	+3.61
Western Australia	Elizabeth Re	1,750	2.02	+2.02
United Australia	Dorothy Hutton	1,577	1.82	+1.82
Christians	Kevin Host	1,504	1.73	−0.71
Total formal votes		86,779	95.32	−0.53
Informal votes		4,259	4.68	+0.53
Turnout		91,038	89.97	+2.24
Two-party-preferred result
Liberal	Vince Connelly	48,289	55.65	−0.47
Labor	Melita Markey	38,490	44.35	+0.47
Liberal hold		Swing	−0.47	

==== 2016 ====
2016 Australian federal election: Stirling
Party	Candidate	Votes	%	±%
Liberal	Michael Keenan	40,991	49.45	−1.27
Labor	Robert Pearson	26,669	32.17	+2.40
Greens	Tom Webster	9,679	11.68	+0.79
Independent	Kim Mubarak	2,172	2.62	+1.63
Christians	Kevin Host	2,019	2.44	+0.34
Rise Up Australia	Alison Rowe	1,361	1.64	+1.05
Total formal votes		82,891	95.85	+1.62
Informal votes		3,587	4.15	−1.62
Turnout		86,478	87.73	−3.57
Two-party-preferred result
Liberal	Michael Keenan	46,520	56.12	−2.85
Labor	Robert Pearson	36,371	43.88	+2.85
Liberal hold		Swing	−2.85	

==== 2013 ====
2013 Australian federal election: Stirling
Party	Candidate	Votes	%	±%
Liberal	Michael Keenan	43,039	51.82	+1.91
Labor	Dan Caddy	23,531	28.33	−3.54
Greens	Tim Clifford	9,359	11.27	−1.63
Palmer United	Wayne Thompson	3,342	4.02	+4.02
Christians	Kevin Host	1,704	2.05	+2.05
Independent	Kim Mubarak	901	1.08	+1.08
Family First	Matueny Luke	686	0.83	−0.21
Rise Up Australia	Alison Rowe	498	0.60	+0.60
Total formal votes		83,060	94.34	−0.64
Informal votes		4,986	5.66	+0.64
Turnout		88,046	91.44	−1.03
Two-party-preferred result
Liberal	Michael Keenan	50,083	60.30	+4.75
Labor	Dan Caddy	32,977	39.70	−4.75
Liberal hold		Swing	+4.75	

==== 2010 ====
2010 Australian federal election: Stirling
Party	Candidate	Votes	%	±%
Liberal	Michael Keenan	40,228	49.91	+2.71
Labor	Louise Durack	25,688	31.87	−8.54
Greens	Chris Martin	10,399	12.90	+5.25
Independent	Elizabeth Re	1,824	2.26	+2.26
Christian Democrats	Jenny Whately	1,630	2.02	+0.26
Family First	Peter Clifford	838	1.04	+0.39
Total formal votes		80,607	94.98	−0.11
Informal votes		4,259	5.02	+0.11
Turnout		84,866	92.52	−1.08
Two-party-preferred result
Liberal	Michael Keenan	44,775	55.55	+4.28
Labor	Louise Durack	35,832	44.45	−4.28
Liberal hold		Swing	+4.28	

=== Elections in the 2000s ===
==== 2007 ====
2007 Australian federal election: Stirling
Party	Candidate	Votes	%	±%
Liberal	Michael Keenan	38,220	47.21	−0.05
Labor	Peter Tinley	32,737	40.44	+1.50
Greens	Tamara Desiatov	6,123	7.56	+0.41
Christian Democrats	Ray Moran	1,407	1.74	−0.20
Liberty & Democracy	Sam Ward	666	0.82	+0.82
What Women Want	Denise Hynd	590	0.73	+0.73
Family First	Symia Hopkinson	524	0.65	+0.65
One Nation	Alex Patrick	524	0.65	−0.82
Citizens Electoral Council	Keith Hallam	160	0.20	−0.71
Total formal votes		80,951	95.09	+1.01
Informal votes		4,178	4.91	−1.01
Turnout		85,129	93.43	+0.48
Two-party-preferred result
Liberal	Michael Keenan	41,520	51.29	−0.75
Labor	Peter Tinley	39,431	48.71	+0.75
Liberal hold		Swing	−0.75	

==== 2004 ====
2004 Australian federal election: Stirling
Party	Candidate	Votes	%	±%
Liberal	Michael Keenan	35,938	47.26	+7.07
Labor	Jann McFarlane	29,616	38.94	−2.30
Greens	Katrina Bercov	5,438	7.15	+1.17
Christian Democrats	Ray Moran	1,472	1.94	+0.61
One Nation	Alex Patrick	1,119	1.47	−2.48
Democrats	Giuseppe Coletti	1,108	1.46	−4.47
Citizens Electoral Council	Leone Pearson	691	0.91	+0.91
Independent	Marcus Anderson	664	0.87	+0.87
Total formal votes		76,046	94.08	−0.52
Informal votes		4,785	5.92	+0.52
Turnout		80,831	92.95	−1.78
Two-party-preferred result
Liberal	Michael Keenan	39,578	52.04	+3.62
Labor	Jann McFarlane	36,468	47.96	−3.62
Liberal gain from Labor		Swing	+3.62	

==== 2001 ====
2001 Australian federal election: Stirling
Party	Candidate	Votes	%	±%
Labor	Jann McFarlane	31,774	41.24	+0.39
Liberal	Bob Cronin	30,963	40.19	−0.69
Greens	Heather Aquilina	4,608	5.98	+1.03
Democrats	Pat Olver	4,572	5.93	+1.65
One Nation	Keith Thorogood	3,041	3.95	−2.66
Liberals for Forests	Perry Jasper	1,071	1.39	+1.39
Christian Democrats	Keith McEncroe	1,022	1.33	+1.33
Total formal votes		77,051	94.60	−0.37
Informal votes		4,395	5.40	+0.37
Turnout		81,446	95.22	
Two-party-preferred result
Labor	Jann McFarlane	39,740	51.58	−0.58
Liberal	Bob Cronin	37,311	48.42	+0.58
Labor hold		Swing	−0.58	

=== Elections in the 1990s ===
==== 1998 ====
1998 Australian federal election: Stirling
Party	Candidate	Votes	%	±%
Liberal	Eoin Cameron	32,015	41.71	−3.48
Labor	Jann McFarlane	30,994	40.38	+2.28
One Nation	John Evans	5,096	6.64	+6.64
Greens	Mark Lockett	3,820	4.98	−0.38
Democrats	Peter Markham	3,303	4.30	−0.91
Australia First	Elaine McNeill	996	1.30	+1.30
Unity	Bronislaw Tabaczynski	321	0.42	+0.42
Natural Law	Leanne Hillel	213	0.28	−0.20
Total formal votes		76,758	95.06	−1.26
Informal votes		3,993	4.94	+1.26
Turnout		80,751	95.27	+0.28
Two-party-preferred result
Labor	Jann McFarlane	39,176	51.04	+4.26
Liberal	Eoin Cameron	37,582	48.96	−4.26
Labor gain from Liberal		Swing	+4.26	

==== 1996 ====
1996 Australian federal election: Stirling
Party	Candidate	Votes	%	±%
Liberal	Eoin Cameron	33,778	50.09	+2.96
Labor	Kareen Carberry	25,917	38.43	−5.01
Greens	Kim Herbert	3,790	5.62	+0.74
Democrats	Lawrence Wapnah	3,525	5.23	+2.09
Natural Law	Cathryn D'Cruz	429	0.64	+0.16
Total formal votes		67,439	96.27	−1.20
Informal votes		2,615	3.73	+1.20
Turnout		70,054	94.99	−1.04
Two-party-preferred result
Liberal	Eoin Cameron	37,044	55.17	+3.71
Labor	Kareen Carberry	30,096	44.83	−3.71
Liberal hold		Swing	+3.71	

==== 1993 ====
1993 Australian federal election: Stirling
Party	Candidate	Votes	%	±%
Liberal	Eoin Cameron	32,337	47.13	+4.07
Labor	Ron Edwards	29,804	43.44	+3.63
Greens	Kate Boland	3,350	4.88	−1.99
Democrats	Richard Jeffreys	2,152	3.14	−4.31
Independent	Dean Economou	640	0.93	+0.93
Natural Law	Cathryn D'Cruz	329	0.48	+0.48
Total formal votes		68,612	97.47	+1.80
Informal votes		1,781	2.53	−1.80
Turnout		70,393	96.03	
Two-party-preferred result
Liberal	Eoin Cameron	35,286	51.47	+1.64
Labor	Ron Edwards	33,277	48.53	−1.64
Liberal gain from Labor		Swing	+1.64	

==== 1990 ====
1990 Australian federal election: Stirling
Party	Candidate	Votes	%	±%
Liberal	Jock Barker	28,257	43.1	+3.2
Labor	Ron Edwards	26,120	39.8	−10.7
Democrats	Lachlan Irvine	4,884	7.4	+2.7
Greens	Kim Herbert	4,511	6.9	+6.9
Independent	Barry Shardlow	813	1.2	+1.2
Grey Power	Eugene Hands	723	1.1	+1.1
Democratic Socialist	Jonathan Strauss	313	0.5	+0.5
Total formal votes		65,621	95.7	
Informal votes		2,971	4.3	
Turnout		68,592	94.8	
Two-party-preferred result
Labor	Ron Edwards	32,864	50.2	−4.7
Liberal	Jock Barker	32,630	49.8	+4.7
Labor hold		Swing	−4.7	

=== Elections in the 1980s ===
==== 1987 ====
1987 Australian federal election: Stirling
Party	Candidate	Votes	%	±%
Labor	Ron Edwards	29,342	49.2	−0.5
Liberal	Bill Brown	24,544	41.2	−3.9
Democrats	Harvard Barclay	2,799	4.7	+0.7
National	Malcolm Beveridge	2,345	3.9	+3.9
Independent	Alf Bussell	594	1.0	+1.0
Total formal votes		59,624	92.8	
Informal votes		4,644	7.2	
Turnout		64,268	93.9	
Two-party-preferred result
Labor	Ron Edwards	31,972	53.6	+1.1
Liberal	Bill Brown	27,642	46.4	−1.1
Labor hold		Swing	+1.1	

==== 1984 ====
1984 Australian federal election: Stirling
Party	Candidate	Votes	%	±%
Labor	Ron Edwards	29,736	49.7	−3.0
Liberal	Greg Hancock	26,994	45.1	+1.9
Democrats	Terence Barrett	2,421	4.0	−0.1
Independent	Eric Martin	675	1.1	+1.1
Total formal votes		59,826	92.4	
Informal votes		4,887	7.6	
Turnout		64,713	94.2	
Two-party-preferred result
Labor	Ron Edwards	31,380	52.5	−2.7
Liberal	Greg Hancock	28,446	47.5	+2.7
Labor hold		Swing	−2.7	

==== 1983 ====
1983 Australian federal election: Stirling
Party	Candidate	Votes	%	±%
Labor	Ron Edwards	35,828	54.5	+12.3
Liberal	Ian Viner	27,181	41.4	−7.5
Democrats	Maria Phillips	2,695	4.1	−2.7
Total formal votes		65,704	98.3	
Informal votes		1,143	1.7	
Turnout		66,847	94.1	
Two-party-preferred result
Labor	Ron Edwards		57.0	+9.0
Liberal	Ian Viner		43.0	−9.0
Labor gain from Liberal		Swing	+9.0	

==== 1980 ====
1980 Australian federal election: Stirling
Party	Candidate	Votes	%	±%
Liberal	Ian Viner	30,307	48.9	−1.3
Labor	Richard Pitts	26,135	42.2	+10.1
Democrats	Jean Jenkins	4,242	6.8	−8.0
Independent	Roger Broinowski	1,301	2.1	+2.1
Total formal votes		61,985	97.3	
Informal votes		1,716	2.7	
Turnout		63,701	94.2	
Two-party-preferred result
Liberal	Ian Viner	32,206	52.0	−7.7
Labor	Richard Pitts	29,779	48.0	+7.7
Liberal hold		Swing	−7.7	

=== Elections in the 1970s ===
==== 1977 ====
1977 Australian federal election: Stirling
Party	Candidate	Votes	%	±%
Liberal	Ian Viner	32,558	50.2	−7.7
Labor	Graham Reece	20,786	32.1	−7.2
Democrats	Scott Christie	9,591	14.8	+14.8
Progress	James Jamieson	1,876	2.9	+0.1
Total formal votes		64,811	97.2	
Informal votes		1,850	2.8	
Turnout		66,661	94.7	
Two-party-preferred result
Liberal	Ian Viner		59.7	+0.4
Labor	Graham Reece		40.3	−0.4
Liberal hold		Swing	+0.4	

==== 1975 ====
1975 Australian federal election: Stirling
Party	Candidate	Votes	%	±%
Liberal	Ian Viner	34,021	57.9	+11.6
Labor	Graham Reece	23,073	39.3	−8.3
Workers	Brian Butterworth	1,643	2.8	+2.8
Total formal votes		58,737	98.1	
Informal votes		1,151	1.9	
Turnout		59,888	95.3	
Two-party-preferred result
Liberal	Ian Viner		59.3	+9.3
Labor	Graham Reece		40.7	−9.3
Liberal hold		Swing	+9.3	

==== 1974 ====
1974 Australian federal election: Stirling
Party	Candidate	Votes	%	±%
Labor	Graham Reece	25,648	47.6	+1.5
Liberal	Ian Viner	24,942	46.3	−1.0
National Alliance	Marie Clark	2,797	5.2	−1.4
Australia	Carolyn Tonge	471	0.9	+0.9
Total formal votes		53,858	97.8	
Informal votes		1,200	2.2	
Turnout		55,058	94.7	
Two-party-preferred result
Liberal	Ian Viner	26,935	50.0	−2.9
Labor	Graham Reece	26,923	50.0	+2.9
Liberal hold		Swing	−2.9	

==== 1972 ====
1972 Australian federal election: Stirling
Party	Candidate	Votes	%	±%
Liberal	Ian Viner	30,446	47.3	+9.7
Labor	Harry Webb	29,686	46.1	−7.0
Democratic Labor	Brian Peachey	4,243	6.6	+0.2
Total formal votes		64,375	97.9	
Informal votes		1,414	2.1	
Turnout		65,789	94.6	
Two-party-preferred result
Liberal	Ian Viner	34,029	52.9	+8.4
Labor	Harry Webb	30,346	47.1	−8.4
Liberal gain from Labor		Swing	+8.4	

=== Elections in the 1960s ===
==== 1969 ====
1969 Australian federal election: Stirling
Party	Candidate	Votes	%	±%
Labor	Harry Webb	28,468	53.1	+6.6
Liberal	Ian Viner	20,146	37.6	−7.1
Democratic Labor	Brian Peachey	3,422	6.4	−2.4
Australia	Allan Cooke	1,540	2.9	+2.9
Total formal votes		53,576	97.2	
Informal votes		1,562	2.8	
Turnout		55,138	94.8	
Two-party-preferred result
Labor	Harry Webb		55.5	+7.6
Liberal	Ian Viner		44.5	−7.6
Labor gain from Liberal		Swing	+7.6	

==== 1966 ====
1966 Australian federal election: Stirling
Party	Candidate	Votes	%	±%
Labor	Harry Webb	33,089	49.9	−0.2
Liberal	Doug Cash	27,403	41.3	−1.8
Democratic Labor	Frank Pownall	5,836	8.8	+2.0
Total formal votes		66,328	96.0	
Informal votes		2,797	4.0	
Turnout		69,125	95.4	
Two-party-preferred result
Labor	Harry Webb	33,998	51.3	−0.2
Liberal	Doug Cash	32,330	48.7	+0.2
Labor hold		Swing	−0.2	

==== 1963 ====
1963 Australian federal election: Stirling
Party	Candidate	Votes	%	±%
Labor	Harry Webb	29,806	50.1	+1.9
Liberal	Doug Cash	25,641	43.1	+5.3
Democratic Labor	Brian Peachey	4,044	6.8	−6.0
Total formal votes		59,491	98.1	
Informal votes		1,126	1.9	
Turnout		60,617	96.5	
Two-party-preferred result
Labor	Harry Webb		51.5	+1.2
Liberal	Doug Cash		48.5	−1.2
Labor hold		Swing	+1.2	

==== 1961 ====
1961 Australian federal election: Stirling
Party	Candidate	Votes	%	±%
Labor	Harry Webb	25,262	48.2	+0.8
Liberal	Doug Cash	19,818	37.8	−2.7
Democratic Labor	Adrian Briffa	6,704	12.8	+2.2
Communist	Jack Marks	649	1.2	+1.2
Total formal votes		52,433	96.5	
Informal votes		1,875	3.5	
Turnout		54,308	95.9	
Two-party-preferred result
Labor	Harry Webb	26,360	50.3	+0.5
Liberal	Doug Cash	26,073	49.7	−0.5
Labor gain from Liberal		Swing	+0.5	

=== Elections in the 1950s ===
==== 1958 ====
1958 Australian federal election: Stirling
Party	Candidate	Votes	%	±%
Labor	Harry Webb	20,936	47.4	−5.4
Liberal	Doug Cash	17,881	40.5	−6.7
Democratic Labor	Brian Peachey	4,668	10.6	+10.6
Independent	James Collins	713	1.6	+1.6
Total formal votes		44,198	96.0	
Informal votes		1,842	4.0	
Turnout		46,040	96.0	
Two-party-preferred result
Liberal	Doug Cash	22,198	50.2	+3.0
Labor	Harry Webb	22,000	49.8	−3.0
Liberal gain from Labor		Swing	+3.0	

==== 1955 ====
1955 Australian federal election: Stirling
Party	Candidate	Votes	%	±%
Labor	Harry Webb	19,257	52.8	−0.4
Liberal	Frederick Payne	17,206	47.2	+0.4
Total formal votes		36,463	95.6	
Informal votes		1,672	4.4	
Turnout		38,135	95.3	
Labor notional hold		Swing	−0.4	
