= Trego =

Trego may refer to:

== People ==
- Peter Trego (born 1981), English cricketer who plays for Somerset
- Reno W. Trego (1877–1961), member of the Wisconsin State Assembly
- William B. T. Trego (1858–1909), American historical artist
- Benjamin Tregoe (1927–2005), co-founder of Kepner–Tregoe (now TregoED), a management consulting firm
- William Trego Webb (1847–1934), British educationist and author

== Places ==
In the United States:

- Trego County, Kansas
- Trego Hot Springs, Nevada
- Trego, Maryland
- Trego, Montana
- Trego, Wisconsin

== Things ==
- USS Trego (AKA-78), US navy Tolland class attack cargo ship

== See also ==
- Trego-Rohrersville Station, Maryland, census-designated place
