= Whitlam shadow ministry (1967–72) =

The Shadow Ministry of Gough Whitlam was the opposition Australian Labor Party frontbench of Australia from 8 February 1967 to 5 December 1972, opposing the Liberal-Country Coalition government.

Gough Whitlam became Leader of the Opposition upon his election as leader of the Australian Labor Party on 9 February 1967, and headed up the Australian Labor Party Caucus Executive until 1969. Following their loss at the 1969 election, the Labor Party adopted a Shadow Cabinet system. The shadow cabinet is a group of senior Opposition spokespeople who form an alternative Cabinet to the government's, whose members shadow or mark each individual Minister or portfolio of the Government.

== Caucus Executive (1967-1969) ==
The following were members of the ALP Caucus Executive from 8 February 1967 to 12 November 1969:

Party	Executive Member	Portrait	Role
Labor	Gough Whitlam (1916–2014) MP for Werriwa (1952–1978)		Leader of the Opposition; Leader of the Labor Party
Labor	Lance Barnard (1919–1997) MP for Bass (1954–1975)		Deputy Leader of the Opposition; Deputy Leader of the Labor Party
Labor	Lionel Murphy (1922–1986) Senator for New South Wales (1962–1975)		Leader of the Opposition in the Senate
Labor	Sam Cohen (1918–1969) Senator for Victoria (1962–1969)		Deputy Leader of the Opposition in the Senate (to 7 October 1969)
Labor	Noel Beaton (1925–2004) MP for Bendigo (1960–1969)		Member of the Caucus Executive (to 9 April 1969)
Labor	Jim Cairns (1914–2003) MP for Yarra (1955–1969)		Member of the Caucus Executive
Labor	Clyde Cameron (1913–2008) MP for Hindmarsh (1949–1980)		Member of the Caucus Executive
Labor	Rex Connor (1907–1977) MP for Cunningham (1963–1977)		Member of the Caucus Executive
Labor	Frank Crean (1916–2008) MP for Melbourne Ports (1951–1977)		Member of the Caucus Executive
Labor	Fred Daly (1912–1995) MP for Grayndler (1949–1975)		Member of the Caucus Executive
Labor	Charles Jones (1917–2003) MP for Newcastle (1958–1983)		Member of the Caucus Executive
Labor	Tony Luchetti (1904–1984) MP for Macquarie (1951–1975)		Member of the Caucus Executive
Labor	Rex Patterson (1927–2016) MP for Dawson (1966–1975)		Member of the Caucus Executive
Labor	Harry Webb (1908–2000) MP for Stirling (1961–1972)		Member of the Caucus Executive

== Shadow Ministry (1969-1972) ==
The following were members of the Shadow Cabinet from 12 November 1969 to 5 December 1972:

Party	Spokesperson	Portrait	Portfolio
Labor	Gough Whitlam (1916–2014) MP for Werriwa (1952–1978)		Leader of the Opposition; Leader of the Labor Party; Opposition Spokesperson for Foreign Affairs
Labor	Lance Barnard (1919–1997) MP for Bass (1954–1975)		Deputy Leader of the Opposition; Deputy Leader of the Labor Party; Opposition Spokesperson for Defence
Labor	Lionel Murphy (1922–1986) Senator for New South Wales (1962–1975)		Leader of the Opposition in the Senate; Opposition Spokesperson for Attorney-General Matters
Labor	Don Willesee (1916–2003) Senator for Western Australia (1950–1975)		Deputy Leader of the Opposition in the Senate
Labor	Kim Beazley (1917–2007) MP for Fremantle (1945–1977)		Opposition Spokesperson for Education
Labor	Jim Cairns (1914–2003) MP for Lalor (1969–1977)		Opposition Spokesperson for Trade and Industry
Labor	Clyde Cameron (1913–2008) MP for Hindmarsh (1949–1980)		Opposition Spokesperson for Labour
Labor	Frank Crean (1916–2008) MP for Melbourne Ports (1951–1977)		Opposition Spokesperson on Economic Matters
Labor	Fred Daly (1912–1995) MP for Grayndler (1949–1975)		Opposition Spokesperson for Immigration
Labor	Bill Hayden (1933–2023) MP for Oxley (1961–1988)		Opposition Spokesperson for Health and Social Security
Labor	Charles Jones (1917–2003) MP for Newcastle (1958–1983)		Opposition Spokesperson for Transport
Labor	Rex Patterson (1927–2016) MP for Dawson (1966–1975)		Opposition Spokesperson for Primary Industry
Labor	Frank Stewart (1923–1979) MP for Lang (1953–1977)		Opposition Spokesperson for Fuel and Natural Resources
Labor	Tom Uren (1921–2015) MP for Reid (1958–1990)		Opposition Spokesperson for Housing and Urban Affairs

== See also ==
- First Whitlam ministry (interim)
- Second Whitlam ministry
- Second Holt Ministry
- McEwen Ministry
- First Gorton Ministry
- Second Gorton Ministry
- McMahon Ministry
