= Department of Employment and Industrial Relations =

Department of Employment and Industrial Relations may refer to:

- Australian Government Department of Employment and Industrial Relations (1975–1978)
- Australian Government Department of Employment and Industrial Relations (1982–1987)
- Queensland Government Department of Employment and Industrial Relations
