= Department of Industrial Relations =

Department of Industrial Relations may refer to:

- Department of Industrial Relations (1978–82), an Australian government department
- Department of Industrial Relations (1987–97), an Australian government department
- California Department of Industrial Relations
