= Ian Sharp (public servant) =

Ian Gordon Sharp AO

Secretary of the Department of Labour
- In office 19 December 1972 – 12 June 1974

Secretary of the Department of Labor and Immigration
- In office 12 June 1974 – 31 March 1975

Personal details
- Born: Ian Gordon Sharp; April 23, 1913
- Died: 26 July 1996 (aged 83)
- Occupation: Public servant

Ian Gordon Sharp AO (April 23, 1913 – July 26, 1996) was a senior-level Australian public servant, best known for his time as Secretary heading the Department of Labour and subsequently the Department of Labor and Immigration in the early 1970s.

== Life and career ==
Ian Sharp was born in 1913. He attended the University of Western Australia, studying Law. Graduating with first class honours, he was admitted to the London School of Economics. His Ph.D thesis "Industrial Conciliation and Arbitration in Great Britain" was published by Allen and Unwin in 1950.

In 1972, Sharp was appointed Secretary of the new Department of Labour, Contrary to the practice of most Whitlam Ministers, who inherited departmental heads from their Menzies Government colleagues, Sharp was chosen for the role by the Minister for Labour Clyde Cameron. Sharp, a lawyer with a background in arbitration was said to be regarded as an old friend by Cameron.

When a New Ministry was announced, and his Minister's role was expanded to include immigration, Sharp's role too expanded and he was made Secretary of the new Department of Labor and Immigration. When Sharp handed over his Secretary position to Peter Wilenski in 1975, he spent three months with Wilenski in something of an "apprenticeship" role, sharing authority in the department, before leaving in March that year.

On 31 March 1975, Sharp started a three-year appointment as a judge of the Australian Conciliation and Arbitration Commission.

== Awards ==
Sharp was appointed an Officer of the Order of Australia in June 1989 for his public service, particularly in the field of industrial relations.

Government offices
Preceded by Hal Cook as Secretary of the Department of Labour and National Service	Secretary of the Department of Labour; 1972 – 1974	Succeeded by Himself as Secretary of the Department of Labor and Immigration
Preceded by George Warwick Smith as Secretary of the Department of the Interior	Secretary of the Department of Labour; 1972 – 1974	Succeeded by Himself as Secretary of the Department of Labor and Immigration
Preceded by Himself as Secretary of the Department of Labour	Secretary of the Department of Labor and Immigration; 1974 – 1975	Succeeded by Peter Wilenski
Preceded by Bob Armstrong as Secretary of the Department of Immigration	Secretary of the Department of Labor and Immigration; 1974 – 1975	Succeeded by Peter Wilenski
