= Department of Labour (Australia) =

Australian government department, 1972–1974

Department overview
- Formed: 19 December 1972
- Preceding Department: Department of the Interior (II) - for industrial relations Department of Labour and National Service - for industrial relations, Commonwealth Employment Service
- Dissolved: 12 June 1974
- Superseding Department: Department of Labor and Immigration
- Jurisdiction: Commonwealth of Australia
- Minister responsible: Clyde Cameron, Minister
- Department executive: Ian Sharp, Secretary

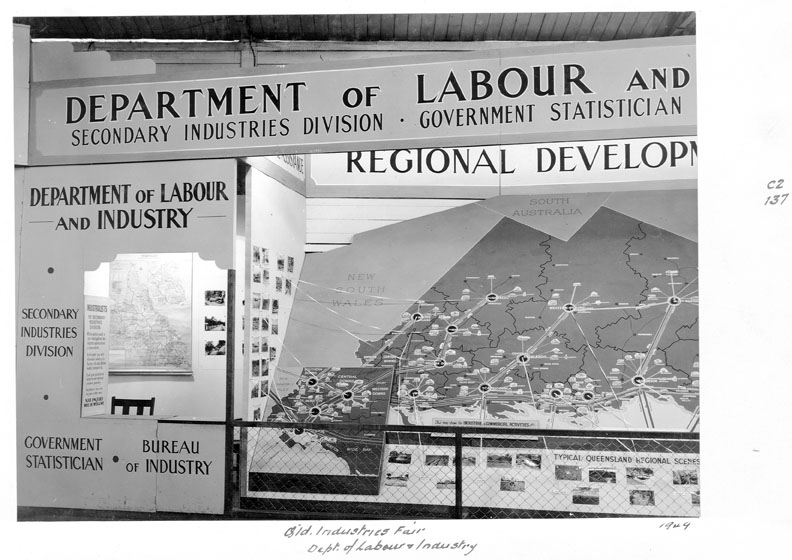
Queensland State Archives 4197 Department of Labour and Industry display at the Queensland Industries Fair 1949

The Department of Labour was an Australian government department that existed between December 1972 and June 1974. This department was created and operated under the Whitlam government, with Clyde Cameron appointed as minister. The Department of Labour was a catalyst for the increase in the national minimum wage and pushed for the equalising of pay rates between men and women. During this period, Cameron pushed for paid maternity and annual leave. They also worked to reduce the number of industrial disputes for the Conciliation and Arbitration Commission. Many attribute the department's employment of wage indexation policies as a contributing factor to the 1975 economic recession.

The Department was one of several new Departments established by the Whitlam government, a wide restructuring that revealed some of the new government's reforms.

== Scope ==
Information about the department's functions and government funding allocation could be found in the Administrative Arrangements Orders, the annual Portfolio Budget Statements and in the Department's annual reports.

According to the Administrative Arrangements Order issued 19 December 1972, at its creation, the Department was responsible for:

- Industrial relations, including conciliation and arbitration in relation to industrial disputes.
- Commonwealth Employment Service.
- Re-instatement in civil employment of national servicemen, members of the Reserve Forces and members of the Citizen Forces.

The Department was a Commonwealth Public Service department, staffed by officials who were responsible to the Minister for Labour, Clyde Cameron.

== Department of Labour Minister: Clyde Cameron ==
In 1972 Clyde Cameron was appointed Minister of the Department of Labour at the age of 59. His central aim involved improving both pay rates and working conditions for Australians. He was known as an 'accidental feminist' due to his appointment of Mary Gaudron, who argued before the Arbitration Commission for equal pay and working conditions for female employees.

Cameron also obtained significant responsibility over the labour reform campaigns prior to the 1972 Australian federal election. These reforms lead to the Whitlam government winning after 23 years of conservative rule.

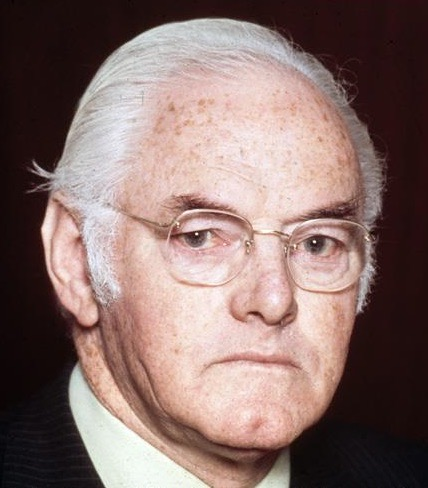
Clyde Cameron in 1973

In 1974, Cameron was re-appointed minister for labour and immigration. This department obtained the same function as the department of labour, however attained extended responsibilities, and operated under a new name.

In 1975, Gough Whitlam replaced Cameron with Jim McClelland, as minister of the Department of Labour and Immigration. This decision was made following the start of a national recession, caused by world wide inflationary pressure from the OPEC oil embargo, and further impacted by national wage increases and harsh tariff reductions.

Cameron was then appointed Minister of Science and Consumer Affairs, which he reluctantly signed.

Whilst Cameron never forgave Whitlam for his dismissal, five months subsequent to this, Whitlam was sacked by the Governor General Sir John Kerr.

== Industrial disputes ==
During the 1960s, industrial disputes were significantly increasing. Most disputes were centred around wages, with unions demanding wage increases to compensate for rises in the general price level. Cameron acknowledged the need for increased wages, and stated that the longer wage issues were ignored, the more complaints the Conciliation and Arbitration Commission will receive. Dissatisfied workers were resorting to strike action as governments were neglecting workers rights, another contributing factor to upsurges in industrial disputation.

Prior to the 1972 federal election, and as part of the Labor Party’s political campaign, Cameron promised the reduction of strikes and overall disputes. During this period, the Labor party sided with unions, claiming they understood the perspective of employees and the demand for more labour reforms. To combat the increasing number of wage disputes, Clyde Cameron proposed wage indexes, stating they would eliminate the number of industrial disputes. However, due to consequential inflation and increasing unemployment, disputation numbers rose from 1145 in 1960 to 2809 in 1974, proving Cameron's reforms to be ineffective.

Historic data on industrial disputes 1960-1980
Year	Number of disputes	Work days lost
1960	1145	725.1
1961	815	606.8
1962	1183	508.8
1963	1250	581.6
1964	1334	911.4
1965	1346	815.9
1966	1273	732.1
1967	1340	705.3
1968	1713	1079.5
1969	2014	1958.0
1970	2738	2393.7
1971	2404	3068.6
1972	2298	2010.3
1973	2538	2634.7
1974	2809	6292.5
1975	2432	3509.9
1976	2055	3799.2
1977	2090	1654.8
1978	2277	2130.8
1979	2042	3964.4
1980	2429	3320.2

== Wage indexation ==
Gough Whitlam, with support from the Department of Labour, increased the minimum wage for both men and women subsequent to a conference with the Conciliation and Arbitration Commission. Unions persuaded the government to make a full time work week 35 hours, but retain a 40 hour week pay rate. Along with Whitlam, Labour Minister Clyde Cameron was responsible for the 12.2 per cent increase in real wages. Cameron viewed the public sector as a wage-fixing model for pay rises, and hoped these new reforms would follow into the private sector.

The pressure on the government and labour department to increase wages was largely attributed to a speculation that the general price level would increase in the near future. This speculation resulted in employee organisations making frequent claims about wage indexes to protect employees from future inflation. Hence, Whitlam and Cameron believed indexing wages would result in less claims. However, this only lead to a further wage inflation spiral.

Cameron was also responsible for increasing annual leave from 3 to 4 weeks.

=== Wage increases for women ===
The minimum wage also became equal for men and women working in the same industries, simultaneously supporting the Australian Council of Trade Union’s (ACTU) desire for higher female wages. The labour department was adamant about equalising women’s pay. Cameron was responsible for appointing Mary Gaudron to argue before the Arbitration Commission about equalising the minimum wage for men and women, and simultaneously extending wage indexes to women. This resulted in female wages matching a males wage, rising from 0.75 cents to a man's dollar, to full equal pay. Cameron also ensured any future national wage increases included women. Subsequent to Cameron appointing Gaudron, she became the first female High Court Justice in Australia. This paved the way for gender equality and a closer gender pay gap in Australia.

=== Paid maternity leave ===
Cameron also improved working conditions for females by introducing paid maternity leave. The Maternity Leave Bill allowed for 12 weeks of fully paid maternity leave. Leave was also granted up to 52 weeks if the mother wished, where the mother had a choice of utilising accrued sick leave or recreation leave. This also ensured mothers were re-employed after the period of leave, where she can undertake her previous employment position, or a position at the closest possible level. Cameron claimed that the aim of the Bill was to equalise employment and career opportunities between males and females.

== Criticisms ==
=== Overall economic impacts ===
Traditional Phillips curve

With the country heading into recession, firms began laying off thousands of employees. Labour Minister Clyde Cameron quickly realised wage indexation impacts did not result in a "short [economic] shock" but turned into years of high unemployment. 1975 inflation levels had soared to 15.42%, with unemployment rising to 4.9% from a low of 2.6% in 1972. Deficits had also hit $2.5 billion, regardless of tax revenue doubling. Despite concerning economic figures, Cameron asked for double digit grants from the Arbitration Commission.

Traditional Keynesian economics supports the concept of inflation and unemployment obtaining an inverse relationship. Economic growth typically places upwards pressure on inflation, innately decreasing unemployment levels. The 1975 Australian recession counteracted basic economic theory, proving that high inflation and high unemployment can coexist. This concept is known as stagflation. Australia's economic position in the 1970s is known as one of the most unstable periods from a macroeconomic perspective. It is difficult for any government to control stagflation due to the nature of macroeconomic policy. Contractionary monetary policy will suppress inflation, however simultaneously stagnate economic growth. This leads to higher unemployment levels.

Inflation and unemployment rate, Australia 1965-1980
Year	Inflation rate	Change in inflation	Unemployment rate
1980	10.14%	1.01%	6.1%
1979	9.12%	1.12%	6.3%
1978	8.00%	-4.30%	6.5%
1977	12.31%	-1.01%	5.7%
1976	13.32%	-1.84%	4.8%
1975	15.16%	-0.25%	4.9%
1974	15.42%	6.33%	2.7%
1973	9.09%	3.07%	2.3%
1972	6.02%	-0.11%	2.6%
1971	6.14%	2.70%	1.9%
1970	3.44%	0.16%	1.6%
1969	3.28%	0.76%	1.8%
1968	2.52%	-0.96%	1.9%
1967	3.48%	0.18%	1.9%
1966	3.29%	-0.11%	1.6%
1965	3.41%	0.54%	1.3%

=== Impact on rural community ===
The rise in wages initiated by the Department of Labour has been held partially responsible for Australia's 1975 economic recession. Former Liberal Prime Minister Malcolm Fraser expressed his concerns for the wage increases, particularly in rural communities. Fraser stated that wage increases would not contribute to a raise in living standards and quality of life, and would only escalate the general price level in the community. He also expressed that the long term consequences of high inflation can be ‘immensely serious’, and would ‘reduce [financial] support’ given to rural communities.

=== Impact on manufacturing industry ===
The manufacturing industry in Australia accounted for over 1.3 million jobs in 1971, totalling roughly a quarter of Australia’s employment. Prior to 1972, Australia obtained full employment, with the balance of payments in a strong financial stance.

Whitlam’s electoral win in 1972 was the beginning of major reforms leading to trade liberalisation. On 16 July 1973, tariffs were slashed by 25% overnight. Australian manufacturing firms could not adjust to quick changes, resulting in rapid unemployment. This included 12,000 electronic industry workers, and 15,000 car manufacturers.

Prior to this reform, only 10% of manufacturing goods were imported. With domestic industries now unprotected, more than half of Australia’s goods are sourced from countries with extremely low minimum wages. Wage indexes were occurring simultaneously to this trade reform. Businesses could not adjust to the lack of protection, and due to wage indexes, could not compete with manufacturing companies such as China and Japan who obtained higher labour productivity. This sent Australia’s international competitiveness on a major decline, as labour productivity was outpaced by countries with lower wage costs.

== Commonwealth Employment Service ==
The Department of Labour was responsible for the Commonwealth Employment Service (CES). This service was established in 1946, and obtained the central goal of full employment. In 1974, the Whitlam government altered its priority from full employment, to inflation management, following the inflation catalysed by the 1974 global oil shock. With this shift in priority, attention was diverted to individual employment, rather than achieving full employment nationally.

The Department of Labour, convinced Whitlam that retraining workers, and focusing on individual employment would solve the high unemployment predicament. The Whitlam government quadrupled expenditure on labour market programs in an attempt to upskill the unemployed. However, the end of 1975 saw the ratio of unemployed being six times more than the available job vacancies. The shortage of job vacancies left the strategy of upskilling workers ineffective as it did not solve the issue of excess labour supply.
