= Michael Keating (public servant) =

Retired Australian senior public servant

Dr Michael Keating AC

Secretary of the Department of Employment and Industrial Relations
- In office 1983–1986

Secretary of the Department of Finance
- In office 1986–1991

Secretary of the Department of the Prime Minister and Cabinet
- In office 1991–1996

Personal details
- Born: Michael Stockton Keating; 25 January 1940 (age 86)
- Education: University of Melbourne; Australian National University
- Occupation: Public servant

Michael Stockton "Mike" Keating AC (born 25 January 1940) is a retired Australian senior public servant.

== Early life ==
Michael Keating was born in 1940. Keating graduated from the University of Melbourne with a first class honours degree in economics. He then studied at the Australian National University, attaining his PhD in 1967.

== Career ==
Keating was appointed Secretary of the Department of Employment and Industrial Relations in May 1983. In 1986 Keating shifted to head the Department of Finance.

In 1991, Prime Minister Paul Keating (no relation) recommended that Michael Keating be appointed as Secretary to the Department of the Prime Minister and Cabinet. Keating retired from the role and left the Australian Public Service in 1996.

Between 1997 and 2007, Keating was a visiting fellow in the Economics Program at the Australian National University. His two principal fields of interest were: integration of social and economic policy, particularly as it relates to improving labour market outcomes; and research into the factors which are affecting Australia's governance, and how governments, institutions and policies are responding, and how relations between the citizen and the state are changing.

In 2015 Keating was appointed as Chairman of The Committee for Sustainable Retirement Incomes.

== Awards and honours ==
In January 1990, Keating was made an Officer of the Order of Australia in recognition of his public service. Six years later he was made a Companion of the Order of Australia, for service to social, economic and public sector reform, particularly as a leader in organizational and management reform.

In 2001, Keating was honoured with an honorary degree from Griffith University.

== Works ==
- With Stephen Bell: Fair Share: Competing Claims and Australia's Economic Future, Melbourne University Press, 2018, ISBN 9780522872279
- Who Rules? How Government Retains Control in a Privatised Economy, Federation Press, 2004, ISBN 1862875189
- With Geoff Dixon: Making Economic Policy in Australia. 1983–1988, Longman Cheshire, 1989, ISBN 0582868246

Government offices
Preceded by Mike Codd	Secretary of the Department of Employment and Industrial Relations; 1983 – 1986	Succeeded by Ed Visbord
Preceded by Ian Castles	Secretary of the Department of Finance; 1986 – 1991	Succeeded by Steve Sedgwick
Preceded by Mike Codd	Secretary of the Department of the Prime Minister and Cabinet; 1991 – 1996	Succeeded by Max Moore-Wilton
