= Committee for Sustainable Retirement Incomes =

- Abbreviation: CSRI
- Formation: 2 June 2015; 9 years ago
- Founder: Patricia Pascuzzo
- Type: Non-profit
- Headquarters: Sydney, Australia
- Website: www.csri.org.au

The Committee for Sustainable Retirement Incomes (CSRI) is an independent, non-partisan, non-profit organisation committed to improving the adequacy and sustainability of retirement incomes in Australia.

The central concern for the CSRI is to ensure that the Australian retirement income system better meets the objectives of alleviating poverty in old age and maintaining living standards in and through retirement – with the central constraint being to achieve these within the budget given the pressures from population ageing.

Chaired by former secretary of the Department of Prime Minister and Cabinet Michael Keating, the CSRI aims to encourage debate by injecting an independent voice to better inform the policy debate and represent the wider community interest including future generations.

The committee's initiatives to date include a Submission to the Financial System Inquiry Report and signed Communique. The official launch in June 2015 took place in Canberra with keynote addresses from Mr David Murray AO, Assistant Treasurer Josh Frydenberg, shadow treasurer Chris Bowen, David Gruen from the Department of Prime Minister and Cabinet and ACOSS CEO Dr Cassandra Goldie.

Other panellists and speakers included Senator Hon Arthur Sinodinos AO, Craig Emerson, Hon Amanda Vanstone, Jeremy Cooper, Hon John Dawkins AO, Councils on the Ageing CEO Ian Yates, Industry Fund Services' Cath Bowtell and National Seniors Australia CEO Michael O'Neill.

== Committee members ==
- Dr Michael Keating AC (chairman)
- Patricia Pascuzzo (founder and executive director)
- Ms Elana Rubin
- Dr Vince FitzGerald AO
- Emeritus Professor Robert Officer AM
- Professor Andrew Podger AO
