= Tony Street =

Australian politician (1926–2022)

The Honourable Tony Street
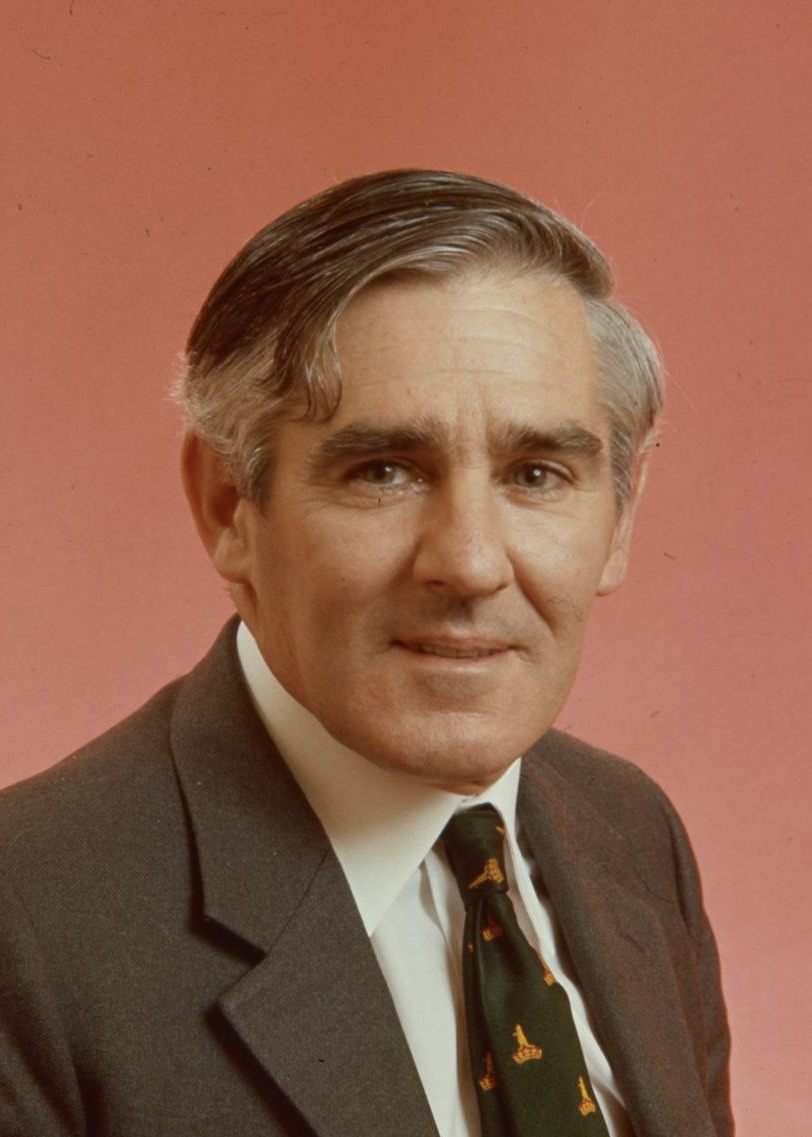

Minister for Foreign Affairs
- In office 3 November 1980 – 11 March 1983
- Prime Minister: Malcolm Fraser
- Preceded by: Andrew Peacock
- Succeeded by: Bill Hayden

Minister for Industrial Relations
- In office 5 December 1978 – 3 November 1980
- Prime Minister: Malcolm Fraser
- Preceded by: Himself
- Succeeded by: Andrew Peacock

Minister for Employment and Industrial Relations
- In office 22 December 1975 – 5 December 1978
- Prime Minister: Malcolm Fraser
- Preceded by: Himself
- Succeeded by: Ian Viner (Employment); Himself (Industrial Relations)

Minister for Labor and Immigration
- In office 11 November 1975 – 22 December 1975
- Prime Minister: Malcolm Fraser
- Preceded by: Jim McClelland
- Succeeded by: Himself; Michael MacKellar (Immigration)

Member of the Australian Parliament for Corangamite
- In office 26 November 1966 – 18 January 1984
- Preceded by: Dan Mackinnon
- Succeeded by: Stewart McArthur

Personal details
- Born: Anthony Austin Street; 8 February 1926 Melbourne, Victoria, Australia
- Died: 25 October 2022 (aged 96)
- Party: Liberal
- Relations: Street family
- Parent: Geoffrey Street (father)

Anthony Austin Street (8 February 1926 – 25 October 2022) was an Australian politician. He served in the House of Representatives from 1966 to 1984, representing the Division of Corangamite for the Liberal Party. He held ministerial office in the Fraser government, serving as Minister for Labor and Immigration (1975), Minister for Employment and Industrial Relations (1975–1978), Minister for Industrial Relations (1978–1980), and Minister for Foreign Affairs (1980–1983). His father Geoffrey Street had also been MP for Corangamite and a federal government minister. Until his death at the age of 96, Street was the last surviving Liberal minister of the first Fraser ministry, as well as the last surviving Assistant Minister of the McMahon government.

== Early life ==
Street was born in Melbourne, Victoria, on 8 February 1926. He was the son of Australian politician Brigadier Geoffrey Austin Street and Evora Street (née Currie). He was raised at the family property Eildon, near Lismore, Victoria. His father was elected to federal parliament in 1934, and he was promoted to the ministry in 1938. At the age of 14, his father was killed in the 1940 Canberra air disaster, along with two other federal cabinet ministers and the head of the army.

Street attended Melbourne Grammar School. After leaving school in 1944 he enlisted in the Royal Australian Navy and served as an able seaman aboard HMAS Norman (M 84), HMAS Queenborough and HMAS Shropshire.

== Political career ==
In 1966 Street was elected as a Liberal member of the Australian House of Representatives, representing the Corangamite division in Victoria, Australia. He remained in this position, winning re-election, until he resigned on 18 January 1984.

From 14 September 1971, during the McMahon Ministry, he was Assistant Minister assisting the Minister for Labour and National Service. In the First Fraser Ministry he became the Minister for Labour and Immigration. In the Second Fraser Ministry he served as Minister for Employment and Industrial Relations, and Minister assisting the Prime Minister for Public Service Matters. During the Third Fraser Ministry he initially served as Minister for Employment and Industrial Relations and then just Minister for Industrial Relations, having lost the Employment part of the portfolio. Swapping portfolios with Andrew Peacock, Street served as Australian Minister for Foreign Affairs during the Fourth Fraser Ministry, from 1980 until 1983.

As employment minister, Street ordered the Commonwealth Employment Service to discontinue collecting its seasonal unemployment statistics on the grounds that they had become inaccurate. Responsibility was transferred to the Australian Bureau of Statistics which began issuing monthly figures.

Street supported multilateralism as foreign minister, stating that "in its role as a middle power, Australia needs a foreign policy which encompasses not just bilateral relations but the multilateral diplomacy of international organisations and blocs of countries acting together".

Street's prominent public addresses included the 1979 Alfred Deakin Memorial Lecture "Class Conflict or Common Goals" and the 1982 Roy Milne Memorial Lecture "Alliances and Foreign Policy Today".

== Personal life and death ==
Street held directorships in several companies and served as a Melbourne Cricket Club committee member. He ran a family property at Lismore.

Street died on 25 October 2022, at the age of 96.

== See also ==
- Street family

Political offices
Preceded by Jim McClelland	Minister for Labour and Immigration; 1975	Succeeded by Michael MacKellar
Preceded by Jim McClelland	Minister for Employment and Industrial Relations; 1975–1978	Succeeded by Ian Viner
Preceded by New title	Minister for Industrial Relations; 1978–1980	Succeeded by Andrew Peacock
Preceded by Andrew Peacock	Minister for Foreign Affairs; 1980–1983	Succeeded by Bill Hayden
Parliament of Australia
Preceded by Dan Mackinnon	Member for Corangamite; 1966–1984	Succeeded by Stewart McArthur
