= Department of Labor and Immigration =

Australian government department, 1974–1975

Department overview
- Formed: 12 June 1974
- Preceding Department: Department of Labour Department of Immigration
- Dissolved: 22 December 1975
- Superseding Department: Department of Foreign Affairs – for passports Department of Employment and Industrial Relations (I) – for labour functions Department of Immigration and Ethnic Affairs (I)
- Jurisdiction: Commonwealth of Australia
- Ministers responsible: Clyde Cameron, Minister (1974–1975); Jim McClelland, Minister (1975); Tony Street, Minister (1945)
- Department executives: Ian Sharp, Secretary (1974–1975); Peter Wilenski, Secretary (1975)

The Department of Labor and Immigration was an Australian government department that existed between June 1974 and December 1975.

== History ==
When the Department of Labor and Immigration was formed by the Whitlam government in June 1974, it represented a merger of the Department of Labour and the Department of Immigration.

== Scope ==
Information about the department's functions and government funding allocation could be found in the Administrative Arrangements Orders, the annual Portfolio Budget Statements and in the Department's annual reports.

At its creation, the Department's functions were:

- Industrial relations, including conciliation and arbitration in relation to industrial disputes
- Commonwealth Employment Service
- Reinstatement in civil employment of national servicemen, members of the Reserve Forces and members of the Citizen Forces
- Assisted migration
- Naturalisation, citizenship and aliens

== Structure ==
The Department was a Commonwealth Public Service department, staffed by officials who were responsible to the Minister for Labor and Immigration.
