= Department of Industry (1928–1940) =

Australian government department, 1928–1940

Department overview
- Formed: 10 December 1928
- Preceding Department: Attorney-General's Department
- Dissolved: 28 October 1940
- Superseding Department: Department of Labour and National Service
- Jurisdiction: Commonwealth of Australia
- Headquarters: Canberra
- Ministers responsible: John Latham, Minister (1928–1929 and 1932–1934); James Scullin, Minister (1929–1932); Robert Menzies, Minister (1934–1939); Billy Hughes, Minister (1939–1940)
- Department executive: Robert R Garran, Secretary (1928–1932)

The Department of Industry was an Australian government department that existed between 1928 and 1940.

== Scope ==
The department dealt with the matters raised by unions on industrial matters and matters related to the administration of the Cockatoo Island Dockyard.

All of the Department's positions were abolished in 1932 and the Department was virtually inactive.

== Structure ==
The Department was a Commonwealth Public Service department, staffed by officials who were responsible to the Minister for Industry.
