= Department of Industrial Relations (1978–1982) =

Former Australian government department

Department overview
- Formed: 5 December 1978
- Preceding Department: Department of Employment and Industrial Relations (I)
- Dissolved: 7 May 1982
- Superseding Department: Department of Employment and Industrial Relations (II)
- Jurisdiction: Commonwealth of Australia
- Headquarters: Canberra
- Ministers responsible: Tony Street, Minister (1978–1980); Andrew Peacock, Minister (1980–1981); Ian Viner, Minister (1981–1982)
- Department executives: Mick Keogh, Secretary (1978–1981); Mike Codd, Secretary (1981–1982)

The Department of Industrial Relations (also called DIR) was an Australian government department that existed between December 1978 and May 1982.

== History ==
The department was established in 1978 by the Fraser government, splitting the former Department of Employment and Industrial Relations into two, reasoning that the two areas were expanding and should thus fall under separate portfolios.

== Scope ==
Information about the department's functions and government funding allocation could be found in the Administrative Arrangements Orders, the annual Portfolio Budget Statements and in the Department's annual reports.

At its creation, the Department was responsible for the following:

- industry-orientated industrial relations
- national industrial relations - legislation and machinery
- national industrial relations policies - wages and working conditions
- industrial relations information and liaison
- economic and international aspects of industrial relations
- Industrial registries

== Structure ==
The Department was an Australian Public Service department, staffed by officials who were responsible to the Minister for Industrial Relations. The department was dependent on the Department of Employment and Youth Affairs for administrative services and accounting functions.

The Secretary of the Department was Mick Keogh between 1978 and 1981. In December 1981, Mike Codd was appointed Acting Secretary. Codd's position was made permanent in 1982, around the same time the department was abolished and the new Department of Employment and Industrial Relations was established.
