= Ron Edwards (Australian politician) =

Australian politician

Ron Edwards AM

Member of the Australian Parliament for Stirling
- In office 5 March 1983 – 13 March 1993
- Preceded by: Ian Viner
- Succeeded by: Eoin Cameron

Personal details
- Born: 2 July 1945 (age 81) Perth, Western Australia
- Party: Australian Labor Party
- Education: University of Western Australia; University of Sydney
- Occupation: Lecturer

Ronald Frederick Edwards AM (born 2 July 1945) is a retired Australian politician. Born in Perth, Western Australia, he was educated at the University of Western Australia and the University of Sydney, after which he became a lecturer in economics and industrial relations. In 1983, he was elected to the Australian House of Representatives as the Labor member for Stirling, defeating the sitting member, Liberal minister Ian Viner. Edwards held Stirling until his defeat by Liberal candidate Eoin Cameron in 1993.

== Early life ==
Edwards was born on 2 July 1945 in West Midland, Western Australia. He was the second of two children born to Daphne (née Hope) and Norman Frederick Edwards; his father was an engine driver. He was educated at Governor Stirling Senior High School, going on to complete a Bachelor of Education at the University of Western Australia in 1966.

In 1966, Edwards moved to Canberra to become an administrative trainee with the Public Service Board. He then moved to Sydney where he was a research officer with the Department of Labour and National Service from 1967 to 1970. He later taught economics and industrial relations at Sydney Technical College and was then head of social sciences at the New South Wales Department of Technical Education. In 1976, Edwards returned to Western Australia and settled in the suburb of Trigg. He became a lecturer in economics and industrial relations at the Churchlands College of Advanced Education, also completing a Master of Education degree at the University of Sydney by correspondence in 1983.

== Politics ==
Edwards joined the Australian Labor Party in 1970 while living in Sydney. He served as president of its Manly branch from 1972 to 1976. After returning to Perth he joined the party's Karrinyup branch.

Edwards elected to the House of Representatives at the 1983 federal election, defeating the incumbent Liberal MP and serving government minister Ian Viner in the seat of Stirling. He retained Stirling at three subsequent elections, although it remained a marginal seat throughout his tenure.

In parliament, Edwards was a member of the Labor Right faction and was a "firm supporter of the Hawke government's economic and industrial relations reform agenda". He was deputy speaker and chairman of committees from 1989 to 1993 and was the first person to hold the formal title of "deputy speaker", which was created in 1992.

Edwards lost his seat to the Liberal candidate Eoin Cameron at the 1993 election; in WA seats that election Labor had suffered badly in swings toward the Coalition, despite a nationwide swing to the ALP. Leo McLeay, the incumbent ALP speaker, had resigned his post shortly before the election and it was speculated that Edwards would have succeeded as speaker had he not been defeated.

== Later activities ==
After his defeat, Edwards hosted a talkback radio show on 6PR. He held board seats on the Anglican Schools Commission (1994–2017), the Perth Mint (2005–2015), and the Potato Marketing Corporation of Western Australia (2013–2017).

Edwards is the co-founder and board member of The Graham (Polly) Farmer Foundation, an educational not-for-profit founded in 1995.

He was appointed a Member of the Order of Australia in the 2026 Australia Day Honours for "significant service to the environment, and to the community".

Parliament of Australia
| Preceded by Ian Viner | Member for Stirling; 1983–1993 | Succeeded by Eoin Cameron |
