= Harry Webb (politician) =

Australian politician

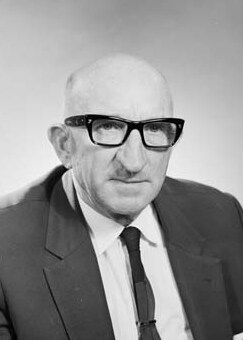
- Webb in 1967

Member of the Australian Parliament for Swan
- In office 29 May 1954 – 10 December 1955
- Preceded by: Bill Grayden
- Succeeded by: Richard Cleaver

Member of the Australian Parliament for Stirling
- In office 10 December 1955 – 22 November 1958
- Preceded by: New seat
- Succeeded by: Doug Cash
- In office 9 December 1961 – 2 December 1972
- Preceded by: Doug Cash
- Succeeded by: Ian Viner

Personal details
- Born: 2 February 1908 Oldham, Lancashire, England
- Died: 15 November 2000 (aged 92)
- Party: Labor
- Occupation: Engineman, unionist

Charles Harry Webb (2 February 1908 – 15 November 2000) was an Australian politician and trade unionist. He was a member of the Australian Labor Party (ALP) and served in the House of Representatives from 1954 to 1958 and from 1961 to 1972, representing Western Australian seats. He later served as administrator of Christmas Island from 1974 to 1975.

== Early life ==
Webb was born on 2 February 1908 in Oldham, Lancashire, England. He moved to Australia as a child.

Webb was educated at state schools, after which he became a locomotive engineman. He was elected general secretary of the Locomotive Engine Drivers', Firemen's and Cleaners' Union in July 1943. He resigned as union secretary upon his election to parliament in 1954. He was also a Western Australian delegate to the interstate executive of the Australian Council of Trade Unions (ACTU).

== Politics ==
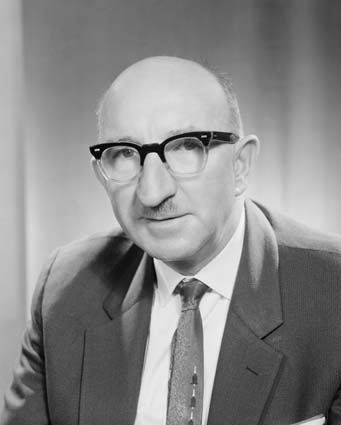
Webb in 1962

Webb joined the ALP at a young age and was president of the Young Labor League for several years in the late 1930s. He stood for ALP preselection in East Perth prior to the 1939 Western Australian state election. He was elected president of the party's metropolitan district council in 1947, replacing Herb Graham, and the following year was elected state president. He was also a delegate to the party's federal executive.

After two previous attempts, Webb was elected to the House of Representatives at the 1954 federal election, winning the seat of Swan for the ALP from the incumbent Liberal MP Bill Grayden. He switched to the newly created seat of Stirling at the 1955 election. He was defeated in 1958 by Liberal candidate Doug Cash, but regained Stirling at the 1961 election and remained in parliament until his defeat at the 1972 election.

Webb was elected to the ALP's parliamentary executive in 1964. He had remained on the federal executive after his election to parliament and emerged as a supporter of Gough Whitlam in his conflict with the federal executive, who had been dubbed the "faceless men". In 1966, he opposed attempts by WA state secretary Joe Chamberlain and the WA state executive to expel Whitlam from the ALP over his public criticism of the federal executive. After Whitlam's election as leader, Webb was a key supporter of Whitlam at meetings of the federal executive. He was a member of Whitlam's shadow cabinet until 1969, when he failed to win re-election at a caucus vote.

== Later life ==
In March 1974, Webb was appointed administrator of Christmas Island, an Australian external territory in the Indian Ocean. He resigned the post in October 1975 due to illness.

Webb died on 15 November 2000, aged 92.

Parliament of Australia
Preceded by Bill Grayden	Member for Swan; 1954 – 1955	Succeeded by Richard Cleaver
Preceded by New seat	Member for Stirling; 1955 – 1958	Succeeded by Doug Cash
Preceded by Doug Cash	Member for Stirling; 1961 – 1972	Succeeded by Ian Viner
