= Hal Cook =

Australian public servant

Sir Hal Cook OBE

Secretary of the Department of Labour and National Service
- In office 8 January 1968 – 19 December 1972

Personal details
- Born: Philip Halford Cook; 10 October 1912 Benalla, Victoria, Australia
- Died: 4 January 1990 (aged 77) Box Hill, Melbourne, Victoria, Australia
- Education: University of Melbourne
- Occupation: Public servant

Sir Philip Halford "Hal" Cook OBE (10 October 1912 – 4 January 1990) was a senior Australian public servant, best known for his time heading the Department of Labour and National Service between 1968 and 1972.

== Life and career ==
Hal Cook was born on 10 October 1912 in Benalla, Victoria to parents Richard Osborne Cook and Elinor Violet May, née Cook.

He was appointed Secretary of the Department of Labour and National Service in January 1968, having worked in the Department since 1946.

When the Whitlam government was elected in 1972, Cook was replaced by the incoming Minister for Labour, Clyde Cameron, who wished to work with instead with Ian Sharp for what media described as "personal" reasons. Cameron later claimed Cook had "put too much time and enthusiasm into preparing evasive answers" to questions in Parliament.

Cook died on 4 January 1990 at Box Hill and was cremated.

== Awards ==
Cook was appointed an Officer of the Order of the British Empire in June 1965 whilst Assistant Secretary in the Victorian Department of Labour. He was made a Knight Bachelor in recognition of his service to the International Labour Organisation in June 1976.

In 1992, the friends of Queen’s College library at the University of Melbourne established the biennial Sir Halford Cook lecture to celebrate Cook's contribution as a student, fellow (1972–90) and council member (1978–90).

Government offices
Preceded by Henry Bland	Secretary of the Department of Labour and National Service; 1968 – 1972	Succeeded by Ian Sharp as Secretary of the Department of Labour
