= Mike Codd =

Australian public servant (born 1939)

Mike Codd AC

Secretary of the Department of Industrial Relations
- In office 15 December 1981 – 7 May 1982

Secretary of the Department of Employment and Industrial Relations
- In office 7 May 1982 – 25 March 1983

Secretary of the Department of Community Services
- In office 13 March 1985 – 10 February 1986

Secretary of the Department of the Prime Minister and Cabinet
- In office 10 February 1986 – 27 December 1991

Personal details
- Born: Michael Henry Codd; 1939 (age 86–87)
- Education: University of Adelaide (BEc (Hons))
- Occupation: Public servant

Michael Henry Codd AC (born 1939) is a retired Australian senior public servant and university chancellor.

== Early life ==
Mike Codd was born in 1939. He attended University of Adelaide, graduating in 1961 with a Bachelor of Economics with honours.

== Career ==
Codd was appointed to his first Secretary role in 1981, becoming head of the Department of Industrial Relations.

Between 1985 and 1986 Codd served as Secretary of the Department of Community Services.

In 1986 he was appointed Department of the Prime Minister and Cabinet Secretary. In 1987 he worked with Prime Minister Bob Hawke to introduce massive reform changes to the public service, creating "super ministry" departments. Codd did note potential disadvantages of the machinery of government changes, including that there was potential for "bunker mentality" to continue.

Codd retired from the public service in December 1991, his appointment was terminated by an Executive Council meeting on 27 December that year.

After his retirement from the Department of the Prime Minister and Cabinet, Codd joined consultancy firm Coopers and Lybrand. He was also appointed to the board of Qantas in 1992, prior to the airline's privatization, and served 16 years retiring in 2008. Between 1997 and 2009 he was Chancellor of the University of Wollongong (UOW), retiring in September 2009.

== Awards and honours ==
In January 1991, Codd was made a Companion of the Order of Australia in recognition of service as secretary to the Department of Prime Minister and Cabinet. He received a Centenary Medal in 2001.

In 2009, the University of Wollongong awarded Mike Codd an honorary degree and in 2010 named a building after him on its Innovation Campus in recognition of his eminent service as the university's second Chancellor. His portrait (by Mathew Lynn, 2014) hangs in the Codd building.

== References and further reading ==
- d'Alpuget, Blanche (2011), Hawke: The Prime Minister, Melbourne University Press, ISBN 9780522858518 (pages 157, 193–194, 202)

Government offices
Preceded by Mick Keogh	Secretary of the Department of Industrial Relations; 1981 – 1982	Succeeded by Himself as Secretary of the Department of Employment and Industrial Relations
Preceded by Rae Taylor as Secretary of the Department of Employment and Youth Affairs	Secretary of the Department of Employment and Industrial Relations; 1982 - 1983	Succeeded by Michael Keating
Preceded by Himself as Secretary of the Department of Industrial Relations	Secretary of the Department of Employment and Industrial Relations; 1982 - 1983	Succeeded by Michael Keating
Preceded by Tony Ayers (Acting)	Secretary of the Department of Community Services; 1985 – 1986	Succeeded by Alan Rose
Preceded by Geoffrey Yeend	Secretary of the Department of the Prime Minister and Cabinet; 1986 – 1991	Succeeded by Michael Keating
Academic offices
Preceded by Robert Marsden Hope	Chancellor of the University of Wollongong; 1997 – 2009	Succeeded by Jillian Broadbent
