= Vince Connelly =

Australian politician

Member of the Australian Parliament for Stirling
- In office 18 May 2019 – 11 April 2022
- Preceded by: Michael Keenan
- Succeeded by: Seat abolished

Personal details
- Born: 16 September 1978 (age 48) Melbourne
- Party: Liberal
- Education: Royal Military College, Duntroon
- Occupation: Parliamentarian
- Website: https://www.vinceconnelly.com.au

Vincent Gerard Connelly (born 16 September 1978) is a former Australian politician who served as a Liberal member of the House of Representatives for the Division of Stirling in Western Australia from 2019 until the seat's abolition in 2022. He ran unsuccessfully for the Liberal Party in the Division of Moore at the 2025 federal election.

== Army career and education ==
Connelly began his career in the Australian Army where he met his wife, Peta, who served as a Major in Intelligence with the Special Air Service Regiment (SASR). Connelly served as a Company Grade Officer in several peacekeeping operations to the Solomon Islands as a Platoon Commander (Lieutenant – LT, 02) and East Timor as a Company Second-in-Command (Captain, CAPT – 03).

Connelly took part in several military exchange programs including with the United States Marine Corps, the Singapore Armed Forces and the Malaysian Armed Forces.

Connelly completed the physical selection course for the SASR in 2010 in the same intake as the Member for Canning, Andrew Hastie, but ultimately was not chosen to proceed to further postings. Both Connelly and Hastie were featured in the SBS Documentary SAS – The Search For Warriors.

Vince Connelly received a Bachelor of Arts, in English Literature from the Australian Defence Force Academy and completed officer training, graduating with a Diploma of Personnel Management (General Service Officer) from the Royal Military College, Duntroon.

== Post-Army career ==
After leaving the Army, Connelly began working as an electorate officer for Julie Bishop, as well as in and with local government during their time at the City of Swan and as a risk consultant for CPR Group. Connelly then moved to the resources industry, including with organisations such as Kepner-Tregoe, Chamber of Minerals and Energy, Dynamiq and Deloitte Australia. Before being elected to Parliament, Connelly worked in risk and crisis management for Woodside Petroleum.

Connelly then moved to the resources industry and worked with organisations such as Kepner-Tregoe; Chamber of Minerals and Energy; Dynamiq and Deloitte Australia. Immediately prior to being elected to Parliament, Connelly worked in risk and crisis management for Woodside Petroleum.

While in the corporate sector, Vince continued serving in the Army Reserve, where he was promoted to Major and his final posting was to the SAS Regiment at Campbell Barracks, WA.

== Political career ==
Connelly was a member of the Centre-Right faction of the Liberal Party. He served as a member of several parliamentary committees including Defence, Foreign Affairs and Trade; Infrastructure; Transport and Cities; National Broadband Network (NBN); Appropriations and Administration; and Mental Health and Suicide Prevention. He was also a member of the Coalition Backbench Policy Committees on Defence and Veterans' Affairs; Foreign Affairs, Investment and Trade; Industrial Relations, Legal and Home Affairs; and Treasury, Finance and Public Administration. Connelly advocated for a large vessel dry berth in Henderson. On 16 September 2021, the Prime Minister confirmed the Federal Government would work with the WA government to invest in a large dry dock at Henderson.

On 19 March 2021, the Australian Electoral Commission published a report proposing a redistribution of WA's federal electoral divisions under which the Division of Stirling would be abolished. The redistribution was confirmed on 4 June 2021. With the Division of Stirling set to be abolished at the 2022 Australian federal election, Connelly announced that he would challenge incumbent Moore MP Ian Goodenough for preselection for that seat. This was against the wishes of senior party figures, including Prime Minister Scott Morrison, who wanted Connelly to run for the Division of Cowan. Moore is a safe seat for the Liberal party, with a margin of 11.6% in the 2019 election, whereas Cowan is a marginal seat, with Labor winning it by 0.8%. Connelly said "(Moore) is where our kids play soccer, where my wife and I participate in our local RSL, it's where we surf, shop and visit friends." In a statement on 4 September 2021, Connelly confirmed he would nominate for the federal seat of Moore. Connelly said "Electoral boundaries may have moved, but my local community has not." Connelly narrowly lost being preselected for Moore 39–36 after preselectors voted at a meeting on 22 September. He was later endorsed as the Liberal candidate for Cowan, where he was defeated by incumbent MP Anne Aly.

In January 2024, Connelly nominated himself for Liberal preselection for the Division of Moore again, going up against Ian Goodenough again, this time succeeding on 17 February. He was defeated by the ALP's Tom French with a swing of 4.9%.

== Personal life ==
Vince Connelly has a wife, Peta, and three teenage children.

Connelly is an active member of the Scarborough Surf Life Saving Club; Legacy WA; the Returned & Services League North Beach Sub-Branch; the Lions Club of North Beach and the Veterans Transition Centre.

Parliament of Australia
Preceded by Michael Keenan	Member for Stirling; 2019–2022	Division abolished
