= Peter Wilenski =

Australian public servant and diplomat

Peter Wilenski AC
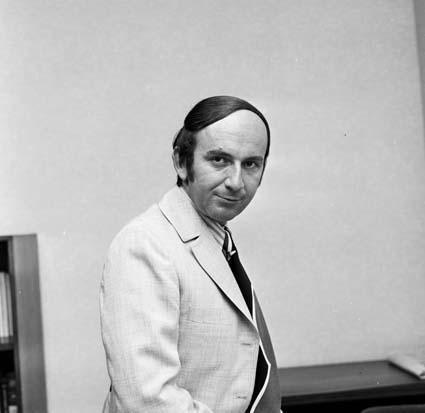
- Wilenski in 1975

Secretary of the Department of Labor and Immigration
- In office 31 March 1975 – 22 December 1975

Secretary of the Department of Education and Youth Affairs
- In office 25 March 1983 – 1 November 1983

Secretary of the Department of Transport and Communications
- In office 24 Jul 1987 – 30 September 1988

Secretary of the Department of Foreign Affairs and Trade
- In office 15 February 1992 – 14 May 1993

Personal details
- Born: Peter Stephen Wilenski; 10 May 1939 Łódź, Poland
- Died: 3 November 1994 (aged 55) Sydney, Australia
- Spouse(s): Gail Radford; Jill Hager
- Children: 2
- Education: University of Sydney; University of Oxford
- Occupation: Public servant

Peter Stephen Wilenski, AC (10 May 1939 – 3 November 1994) was a senior Australian public servant and ambassador. He was an advocate of women's rights and equal opportunity.

== Early life ==
Peter Wilenski was born in Łódź, Poland on 10 May 1939. He came to Australia in 1943 as a Jewish refugee, due to World War II conflict and persecution of Jewish people in his home country. His family spent time in a Soviet internment camp before coming to Australia. For high school education, he attended Sydney Boys High School. He later studied at the University of Sydney where he met his first wife, Gail Radford, when both were student politicians.

== Career ==
Wilenski entered the Australian Public Service as a Foreign Affairs Officer (1967–71).

Wilenski's first Secretary role was in the Department of Labor and Immigration, appointed by the Whitlam government in March 1975 fresh from a position as private secretary to Prime Minister Gough Whitlam. Just months after his appointment, the federal opposition were promising to sack Wilenski when they were back in power. During the 1970s Wilenski was working for the United States of America in what a historian has called "a discreet relationship".

In March 1983 Wilenski was placed in his second Secretary role, this time as head of the Department of Education and Youth Affairs. His tenure at the department was seven months.

Wilenski was appointed Secretary of the Department of Foreign Affairs and Trade in 1992, but retired from the position in 1993 due to ill health.

== Awards ==
In 1994, Wilenski was named a Companion of the Order of Australia for service to international relations and to public sector reform, particularly through fostering the implementation of social justice and equity principles.

== Death ==
Wilenski died on 3 November 1994 at his home in Sydney after battling lymphatic cancer for several years.

Government offices
Preceded by Ian Sharp	Secretary of the Department of Labor and Immigration; 1975	Succeeded by Lloyd Bott as Secretary of the Department of Immigration and Ethnic Affairs
Preceded by Kenneth Norman Jones	Secretary of the Department of Education and Youth Affairs; 1983	Succeeded by Helen Williams (Acting)
Preceded by William Cole	Chairman of the Public Service Board; 1983–1987	Succeeded by John Enfield
Preceded by Charles Halton as Secretary of the Department of Communications	Secretary of the Department of Transport and Communications; 1987–1988	Succeeded by Graham Evans
Preceded by Rae Taylor as Secretary of the Department of Transport	Secretary of the Department of Transport and Communications; 1987–1988	Succeeded by Graham Evans
Preceded by Collin Freeland as Secretary of the Department of Aviation	Secretary of the Department of Transport and Communications; 1987–1988	Succeeded by Graham Evans
Preceded by Richard Woolcott	Secretary of the Department of Foreign Affairs and Trade; 1992–1993	Succeeded by Michael Costello
Diplomatic posts
Preceded by Michael Costello (acting)	Permanent Representative of Australia to the United Nations; 1989–1992	Succeeded by Richard Butler
