= Department of Employment and Industrial Relations (1982–1987) =

Australian government department, 1982-1987

Department overview
- Formed: 7 May 1982
- Preceding Department: Department of Industrial Relations (I) Department of Employment and Youth Affairs
- Dissolved: 24 July 1987
- Superseding Department: Department of Industrial Relations (II) Department of Employment, Education and Training
- Jurisdiction: Commonwealth of Australia
- Headquarters: Canberra
- Ministers responsible: Ian Macphee, Minister (1982–1983); Ralph Willis, Minister (1983–1987)
- Department executives: Mike Codd, Secretary (1982–1983); Michael Keating, Secretary (1983–1986); Ed Visbord, Secretary (1986–1987)

The Department of Employment and Industrial Relations was an Australian government department that existed between May 1982 and July 1987. It was the second Australian Government Department to be given the name.

When announcing the new department in 1982, Prime Minister Malcolm Fraser issued a press release stating that "the Government's policies in relation to maintaining high levels of employment and effective industrial relations, and the close links between these two areas require the Departments of Industrial Relations and Employment and Youth Affairs to be brought together again. The Department's were split during the formative stages of the employment and training programs."

== Scope ==
Information about the department's functions and government funding allocation could be found in the Administrative Arrangements Orders, the annual Portfolio Budget Statements and in the department's annual reports.

At its creation, the department was responsible for the following:

- Commonwealth Employment
- Manpower and training
- Youth affairs
- Re-instatement in civil employment of national servicemen, members of the Reserve Forces and members of the Citizen Forces
- Industrial relations, including -
  - Conciliation and Arbitration in relation to industrial disputes
  - Promotion of sound industrial relations policies, practices and machinery
  - Co-ordination of Government policies on wages and labour costs
  - Monitoring of industrial disputes involving Commonwealth employees in departments and authorities
  - Chairmanship of the Co-ordination Committee on industrial relations in Commonwealth employment.

== Structure ==
The department was an Australian Public Service department, staffed by officials who were responsible to the Minister for Employment and Industrial Relations.
