= Eoin Cameron =

Australian politician & radio host

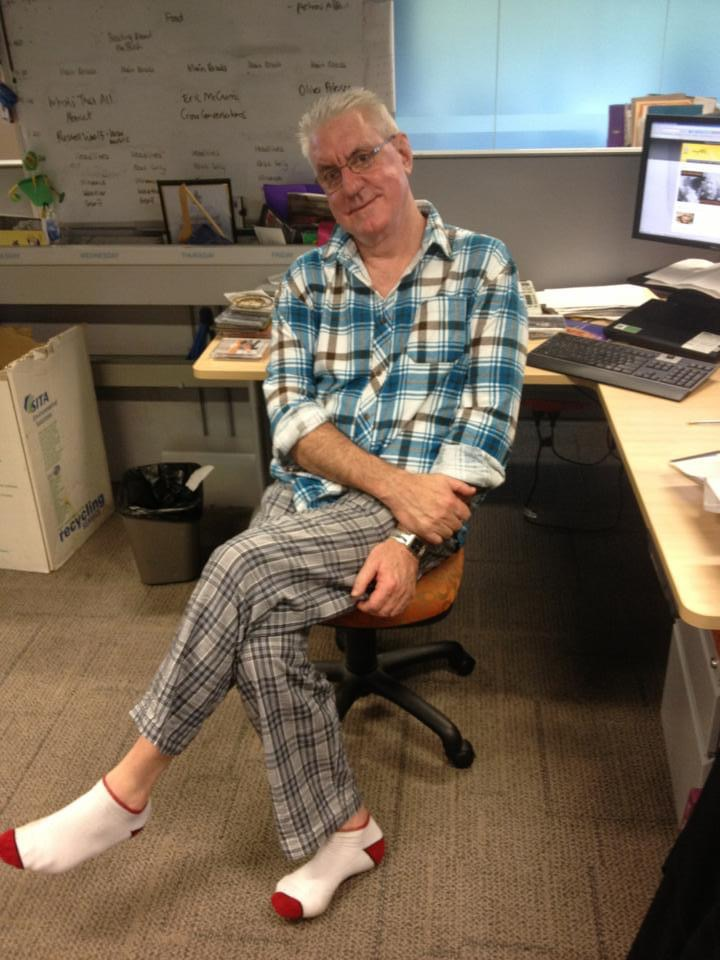

Member of the Australian Parliament for Stirling
- In office 13 March 1993 – 3 October 1998
- Preceded by: Ron Edwards
- Succeeded by: Jann McFarlane

Personal details
- Born: Eoin Harrap Cameron; 4 January 1951 Mount Gambier, South Australia
- Died: 23 June 2016 (aged 65) Albany, Western Australia
- Party: Liberal Party of Australia
- Children: Ryan Cameron, Jacinta Branson, Jane Gaspar
- Occupation: Radio personality

Eoin Harrap Cameron (4 January 1951 – 23 June 2016) was an Australian radio personality in Perth, Western Australia and member of the Australian House of Representatives. Until August 2015 he presented the ABC Radio Perth breakfast show, regularly receiving top ratings for the most popular breakfast radio show. In August 2015 he took extended leave while recovering from surgery as a result of a 2013 car accident. In January 2016 he announced that he was retiring, but would return to the studio "temporarily ... to say a proper goodbye to listeners". His last day at the ABC was 11 March.

== Radio personality ==
Cameron started his first job in radio at age 18, at the Albany radio station 6VA in 1969. Following that he worked at many Perth radio stations including 6IX, 94.5 and 6PR, as well as Melbourne station 3DB. His last 14 years, until his retirement, were as breakfast presenter for ABC Radio Perth, where he consistently topped the ratings for that time slot. He was described by colleague Geoff Hutchison as having a "delicious need to delight and offend in equal measure", and known for regularly ignoring political correctness.

He made minor television appearances in The Grant and Cameron show and The Entertainers, both on Channel 9.

== Parliamentarian ==
Cameron stood for the seat of Stirling in the 1993 Australian federal election, winning the seat for the Liberal Party. He held the seat in the 1996 election, before losing to Labor's Jann McFarlane in the 1998 election. Cameron supported Hewson in the leadership spill that John Hewson lost to Alexander Downer in 1994.

== Writer ==
Cameron wrote a number of books including:

- Rolling into The World – Memoirs of a Ratbag Child (2003) ISBN 978-1-920731-06-9
- The Sixties – An Irreverent Guide (2004) ISBN 1-920731-52-0
- The Voice of the Great South (2005) ISBN 1-920731-95-4

== Personal life ==
Cameron was born in Mount Gambier, South Australia, the second of ten children. He left school at 14 and did a variety of jobs including farm labourer and roustabout. His family moved to Western Australia when he was 16.

Cameron was married, and had three children.

Cameron had bipolar disorder, which he believed had been caused by his sexual assault by his headmaster at a Catholic boarding school.

In 2013 he was involved in a car crash and suffered serious back injuries, requiring multiple operations over the next two years and two metal discs to help hold his spine and support his body weight. As a result of Eoin's ongoing health battles, he was forced into an early retirement from the ABC in 2016.

On 23 June 2016, Eoin Cameron died following a heart attack in Albany. His death was announced on the ABC throughout the night.

Parliament of Australia
Preceded by Ron Edwards	Member for Stirling; 1993–1998	Succeeded by Jann McFarlane
