= Department of Employment and Youth Affairs =

Australian government department, 1978–1982

Department overview
- Formed: 5 December 1978
- Preceding Department: Department of Employment and Industrial Relations (I) Department of Environment, Housing and Community Development
- Dissolved: 7 May 1982
- Superseding Department: Department of Employment and Industrial Relations (II)
- Jurisdiction: Commonwealth of Australia
- Ministers responsible: Ian Viner, Minister for Employment and Youth Affairs (1978-81); Neil Brown, Minister for Employment and Youth Affairs (1981-82)
- Department executives: Brian Tregillis, Acting Secretary (1978); Rae Taylor, Secretary (1978-82)

The Department of Employment and Youth Affairs was an Australian government department that existed between December 1978 and May 1982.

== Scope ==
Information about the department's functions and government funding allocation could be found in the Administrative Arrangements Orders, the annual Portfolio Budget Statements and in the Department's annual reports.

At its creation, the Department was responsible for the following:

- Commonwealth Employment Service
- Manpower and training
- Youth Affairs
- Reinstatement in civil employment - of national servicemen, members of the Reserve Forces and members of the Citizens Forces.

== Structure ==
The Department was an Australian Public Service department, staffed by officials who were responsible to the Minister for Employment and Youth Affairs.
