= Jann McFarlane =

Australian politician

Member of the Australian Parliament for Stirling
- In office 3 October 1998 – 9 October 2004
- Preceded by: Eoin Cameron
- Succeeded by: Michael Keenan

Personal details
- Born: 22 May 1944 (age 82) Sydney, Australia
- Party: Labor
- Education: Macquarie University
- Occupation: Community worker

Jann Sonya McFarlane (born 22 May 1944) is a former Australian politician. She was a member of the House of Representatives from 1998 to 2004, representing the Western Australian seat of Stirling for the Australian Labor Party (ALP).

== Early life ==
McFarlane was born in Sydney on 22 May 1944. Her father abandoned the family when she was a small child and her mother remarried in the early 1950s. She grew up in a rural area and her family "struggled with domestic violence, alcoholism and poverty".

After leaving school McFarlane worked as a cleaner, secretary and clerk. She later completed a Bachelor of Arts at Macquarie University as a mature-age student and began working in the community sector. Prior to her election to parliament she had worked at a community legal centre and welfare rights centre for six years.

== Politics ==
McFarlane joined the Australian Labor Party (ALP) in 1978. She was elected to the House of Representatives at the 1998 federal election, defeating the incumbent Liberal MP Eoin Cameron in the seat of Stirling.

McFarlane was re-elected at the 2001 election but lost her seat to the Liberal candidate Michael Keenan at the 2004 election. During the election campaign she attracted attention for a gaffe in which she implied that the ALP's tax policies announced by opposition leader Mark Latham would need to be "adjusted". She subsequently released a statement retracting her comments.

In 2006, McFarlane was investigated by the Department of Finance over allegations she had misused electoral entitlements to allow constituents to make long-distance calls. She stated that she "utterly denied and refuted the allegations".

== Personal life ==
McFarlane was diagnosed with bowel cancer in 2004 and underwent surgery.

Parliament of Australia
Preceded by Eoin Cameron	Member for Stirling; 1998–2004	Succeeded by Michael Keenan
