= TregoED =

Critical thinking skill

The Tregoe Education Forum (renamed TregoED in 2010) was established in 1993 by Benjamin Tregoe, co-founder of Kepner-Tregoe. TregoED is a non-profit educational organization whose purpose is to help K–12 students and educators learn to solve problems using critical thinking and decision-making strategies. TregoED applies modified versions of Kepner-Tregoe's rational thinking processes by using workshops and online tools geared towards school and district leaders, teachers, and students.

TregoED works with K–12 schools and districts across the US and Canada.
