= Ian Viner =

Australian solicitor, barrister, and politician

The Honourable Ian Viner AO KC
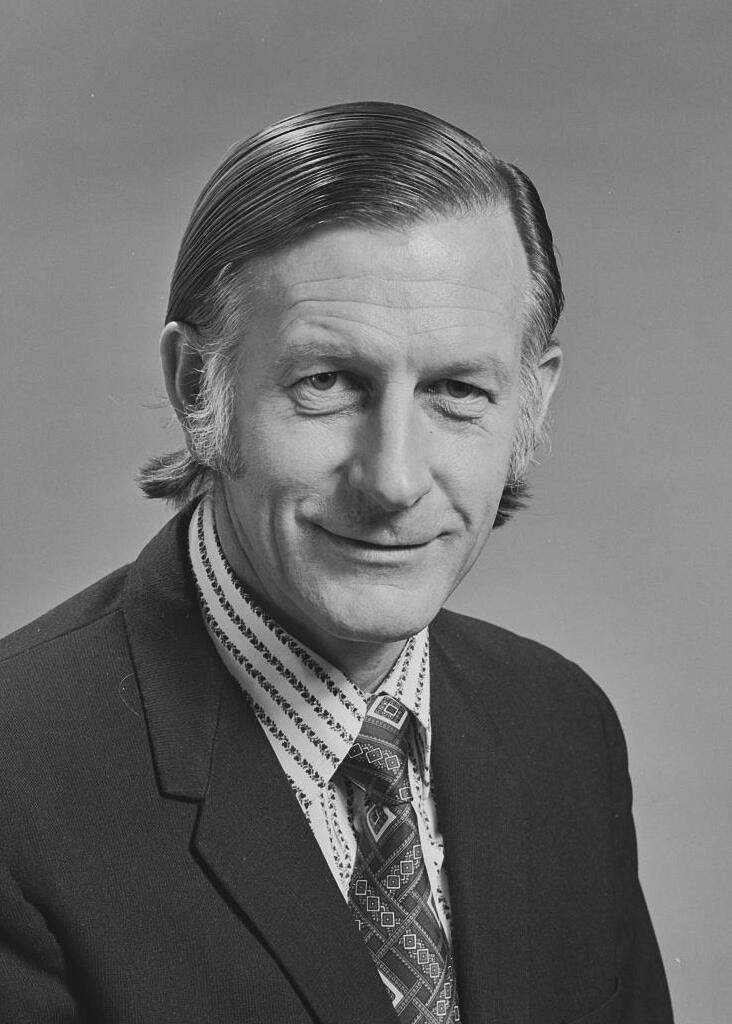
- Viner in 1974

Minister for Defence Support
- In office 7 May 1982 – 11 March 1983
- Prime Minister: Malcolm Fraser
- Preceded by: office established
- Succeeded by: Brian Howe

Minister for Industrial Relations
- In office 16 April 1981 – 7 May 1982
- Preceded by: Andrew Peacock
- Succeeded by: Ian Macphee

Leader of the House
- In office 27 September 1979 – 19 August 1980
- Leader: Malcolm Fraser
- Preceded by: Ian Sinclair
- Succeeded by: Ian Sinclair

Minister of Employment and Youth Affairs
- In office 5 December 1978 – 6 April 1981
- Preceded by: Tony Street
- Succeeded by: Neil Brown

Minister of Aboriginal Affairs
- In office 22 December 1975 – 5 December 1978
- Preceded by: Tom Drake-Brockman
- Succeeded by: Fred Chaney

Member of the Australian Parliament for Stirling
- In office 2 December 1972 – 5 March 1983
- Preceded by: Harry Webb
- Succeeded by: Ron Edwards

Personal details
- Born: Robert Ian Viner; 21 January 1933 (age 93) Claremont, Western Australia
- Party: Liberal
- Education: University of Western Australia
- Profession: Barrister

Robert Ian Viner (born 21 January 1933) is a former Australian politician and barrister. He was a member of the House of Representatives from 1972 to 1983, representing the Liberal Party, and held senior ministerial office in the Fraser government.

Viner was born in Perth and raised in Bunbury, Western Australia. He studied law at the University of Western Australia and subsequently worked as a barrister in Perth. He was first elected to parliament at the 1972 federal election, winning the seat of Stirling for the Liberal Party. An ally of Prime Minister Malcolm Fraser, Viner served as Minister for Aboriginal Affairs (1975–1978), Employment and Youth Affairs (1978–1982), Industrial Relations (1981–1982), and Defence Support (1982–1983). He was also Leader of the House from 1979 to 1980. He lost his seat in the government's defeat at the 1983 election.

== Early life ==
Viner was born on 21 January 1933 in Claremont, Western Australia. He was raised in Bunbury, attending Bunbury Primary School and Bunbury High School.

Viner left school at the age of 15 and began working for the Union Bank of Australia, at its Bunbury and York branches. He also completed National Service training with the Royal Australian Air Force (RAAF). He enrolled in the University of Western Australia in 1954 and graduated Bachelor of Laws (Hons.) in 1958.

Prior to his election to parliament, Viner worked as a barrister in Perth. He regularly represented trade union clients in industrial cases.

== Politics ==
Viner was elected to the House of Representatives at the 1972 federal election, winning the seat of Stirling from the incumbent Australian Labor Party (ALP) MP Harry Webb. He was narrowly re-elected at the 1974 election, initially losing by a margin of two votes but eventually being declared elected with a twelve-vote margin after a recount. He was subsequently part of a group of MPs who supported Malcolm Fraser in the lead-up to the 1975 leadership spill which ousted Billy Snedden from the Liberal leadership.

Following the Coalition's victory at the 1975 federal election, Viner was appointed Minister for Aboriginal Affairs in the Fraser government on 22 December 1975. He was reportedly a "surprise inclusion" in the ministry, having not been a part of Fraser's shadow cabinet and having previously had limited involve in Aboriginal affairs. He was responsible for the introduction of the Aboriginal Land Rights Act 1976, the first federal native title legislation, and the Aboriginal Councils and Associations Act 1976, which allowed for the establishment of Aboriginal corporations under federal law. He promoted "self-management and self-sufficiency" for Indigenous Australians, called for greater teaching of Aboriginal language and culture in Australian schools, and established the Council for Aboriginal Development as an advisory body.

Viner was elevated to cabinet after the 1977 federal election and additionally appointed Minister Assisting the Prime Minister. He was instead appointed Minister for Employment and Youth Affairs in a ministerial reshuffle in 1978. He was Leader of the House from 1979 to 1980 and was additionally appointed Minister for Industrial Relations in 1981. According to Anne Summers, in the industrial relations portfolio Viner had "one of the roughest rides any federal minister in the Fraser Government has endured".

Viner was an unsuccessful candidate for the deputy leadership of the Liberal Party in April 1982, following Phillip Lynch's resignation. He polled only five votes out of 81 and was eliminated on the first round, sparking speculation about his future as a minister. In a ministerial reshuffle the following month, Viner was removed from cabinet and instead appointed Minister for Defence Support. He retained that position until his defeat by Labor candidate Ron Edwards at the 1983 election.

== Later activities ==
Viner was elected state president of the Liberal Party in Western Australia in 1991. He was defeated for re-election by Bill Hassell the following year. He was associated with a group opposing powerbroker Noel Crichton-Browne, and was allegedly involved in the leaking of domestic violence allegations against Crichton-Browne which contributed to the end of his parliamentary career. Crichtown-Browne's supporters then unsuccessfully attempted to have Viner expelled from the party.

In 1995, Viner was appointed by the Keating government as deputy chairman of the Council for Aboriginal Reconciliation. He was appointed to the National Native Title Tribunal in the same year.

== Personal life ==
Viner had seven children with his wife Ngaire. They lived in Swanbourne until 1977, when they relocated to Waterman in order to live in his electorate boundaries.

Viner played field hockey throughout his political career and later captained Australia at a masters level.

Viner was appointed an Officer of the Order of Australia in the Queen's Birthday Honours in June 1999.

== Notes ==
Political offices
Preceded by Tom Drake-Brockman	Minister for Aboriginal Affairs; 1975–78	Succeeded by Fred Chaney
Preceded by Tony Street	Minister for Employment and Youth Affairs; 1978–81	Succeeded by Neil Brown
Preceded by Andrew Peacock	Minister for Industrial Relations; 1981–82	Succeeded by Ian Macphee
Preceded by New title	Minister for Defence Support; 1982–83	Succeeded by Brian Howe
Parliament of Australia
Preceded by Harry Webb	Member for Stirling; 1972–83	Succeeded by Ron Edwards
