= Department of Labour and National Service =

Australian government department, 1940–1972

Department overview
- Formed: 28 October 1940
- Preceding Department: Department of Industry (I)
- Dissolved: 19 December 1972
- Superseding Department: Department of Services and Property – for union ballots Department of Housing – for hostels in the ACT and immigrants Department of Labour – for industrial relations, Commonwealth Employment Service Department of Education (I) – for child care
- Jurisdiction: Commonwealth of Australia
- Ministers responsible: Harold Holt, Minister (1940–1941) and (1949–1958); Eddie Ward, Minister (1941–1943); Jack Holloway, Minister (1943–1949); William McMahon, Minister (1958–1966); Les Bury, Minister (1966–1969); Billy Snedden, Minister (1969–1971); Phillip Lynch, Minister (1971–1972)
- Department executives: Roland Wilson, Secretary (1940–1946); William Funnell, Secretary (1946–1952); Henry Bland, Secretary (1952–1968); Hal Cook, Secretary (1968–1972)

The Department of Labour and National Service was an Australian government department that existed between October 1940 and December 1972.

== Scope ==
Information about the department's functions and government funding allocation could be found in the Administrative Arrangements Orders, the annual Portfolio Budget Statements and in the department's annual reports.

At its creation, the department's functions were general labour policy, manpower priorities, investigations of labour supply and labour demand, the effective placement of labour, technical training, industrial relations and industrial welfare, and planning for post-war rehabilitation and development.

== Structure ==
The department was a Commonwealth Public Service department, staffed by officials who were responsible to the Minister for Labour and National Service.

Sir Roland Wilson was seconded to establish the new Department of Labour and National Service in 1940, and at 36 years old became its first administrative head.
