= Michael Keenan (politician) =

Australian politician

The Honourable Michael Keenan
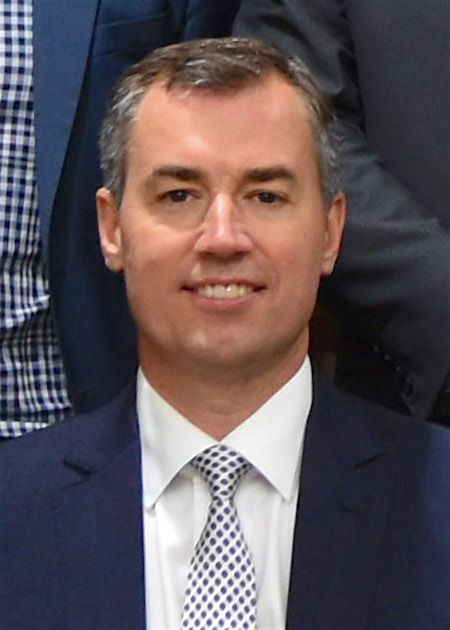

Minister for Human Services
- In office 20 December 2017 – 29 May 2019
- Prime Minister: Malcolm Turnbull; Scott Morrison
- Preceded by: Alan Tudge
- Succeeded by: Stuart Robert

Minister for Digital Transformation
- In office 20 December 2017 – 29 May 2019
- Prime Minister: Malcolm Turnbull; Scott Morrison
- Preceded by: Angus Taylor (as assistant minister)
- Succeeded by: Abolished

Minister for Justice
- In office 18 September 2013 – 20 December 2017
- Prime Minister: Tony Abbott; Malcolm Turnbull
- Preceded by: Jason Clare
- Succeeded by: Angus Taylor (as Minister for Law Enforcement and Cybersecurity)

Minister Assisting the Prime Minister on Counter-Terrorism
- In office 28 May 2015 – 20 December 2017
- Prime Minister: Tony Abbott; Malcolm Turnbull
- Preceded by: New ministerial post
- Succeeded by: Angus Taylor (as Minister for Law Enforcement and Cybersecurity)

Member of the Australian Parliament for Stirling
- In office 9 October 2004 – 11 April 2019
- Preceded by: Jann McFarlane
- Succeeded by: Vince Connelly

Personal details
- Born: Michael Fayat Keenan; 19 March 1972 (age 54) Perth, Western Australia
- Party: Liberal
- Other political affiliations: Coalition
- Spouse: Georgina Bower
- Children: 4
- Education: Trinity College, Perth
- Alma mater: Murdoch University; Charles University, Prague; Australian National University; University of Cambridge
- Website: www.keenan.net.au

Michael Fayat Keenan (born 19 March 1972) is an Australian former politician who was a member of the House of Representatives representing the Division of Stirling for the Liberal Party from the 2004 federal election until his retirement in 2019. He was the Minister for Human Services and the Minister Assisting the Prime Minister for Digital Transformation in the Morrison government from 2017 until his retirement. He previously served as Minister for Justice from 2013 to 2017.

== Early life ==
Keenan was born in Perth. His father Peter was born in County Durham, England. During the parliamentary eligibility crisis of 2017, it came to public attention that Keenan had acquired British citizenship by descent at birth, which he renounced before the 2004 election. Some media outlets had incorrectly reported that he had never renounced his citizenship; in response, he wrote "I am an Australian citizen and I do not hold citizenship of any other country. Fairfax is aware of this, yet in a cheap grab for a headline they have ignored this".

== Education ==
Keenan went to school at Trinity College, Perth. He later attended Murdoch University, the Australian National University, and Cambridge University, where he obtained a master's degree in philosophy. He was a property consultant with a real estate firm before entering politics. He had previously worked as an adviser to Senator Amanda Vanstone and was deputy director of the Liberal Party of Western Australia.

== Politics ==
Keenan was elected to parliament at the 2004 federal election, defeating the incumbent Labor member Jann McFarlane. He was promoted to the shadow ministry after the 2007 election, serving as Shadow Assistant Treasurer (2007–2008), Shadow Minister for Employment and Workplace Relations (2008–2009), and finally Shadow Minister for Justice, Customs and Border Protection (2009–2013). He was identified by the media as a supporter of Malcolm Turnbull in the 2009 leadership spill.

=== Government minister ===
Following the 2013 federal election, Keenan was appointed Minister for Justice in the Abbott government. He was also made Minister Assisting the Prime Minister on Counter-Terrorism in May 2015. In the 2015 leadership spill, Keenan was again identified as one of Turnbull's supporters. He retained both his positions in the new ministry.

During the 2016 federal election campaign, Keenan was accused of starting a smear campaign against the Muslim Labor candidate Anne Aly, in reference to her previous counter-terrorism work. Keenan appeared with Liberal MP Luke Simpkins, the incumbent in Cowan whose seat was challenged by Aly, to make accusations against her. However, prior to Aly becoming a Labor candidate, Simpkins had written to her in admiration of her counter-terrorism work.

As justice minister, Keenan oversaw the first national firearms amnesty since the 1996 Port Arthur massacre. It ran from July to September 2017, allowing people to hand in unregistered or unwanted firearms. The amnesty had been approved in March 2017 by the Firearms and Weapons Policy Working Group to reduce the number of unregistered firearms in Australia that were being used in Islamic terrorist attacks.

In a ministerial reshuffle in December 2017, Keenan was promoted to cabinet as Minister for Human Services and Minister Assisting the Prime Minister for Digital Transformation. On 25 January 2019 he announced that he would not contest the 2019 election, to spend more time with his family after 15 years in parliament. He and his wife have four sons, all born while he was a member of parliament.

In February 2019, one of Keenan's office staffers was implicated in conspiring with Michaelia Cash's office staff in making strategic media leaks about Australian Federal Police raids in 2017 on the offices of the Australian Workers' Union.

Parliament of Australia
Preceded by Jann McFarlane	Member for Stirling; 2004–2019	Succeeded by Vince Connelly
Political offices
Preceded by Jason Clare	Minister for Justice; 2013–2017	Succeeded by Angus Taylor as Minister for Law Enforcement and Cybersecurity
New ministerial post	Minister Assisting the Prime Minister on Counter-Terrorism; 2015–2017	Succeeded by Angus Taylor as Minister for Law Enforcement and Cybersecurity
Preceded by Alan Tudge	Minister for Human Services; 2017–2019	Succeeded by Stuart Robert
Preceded by Angus Taylor as Assistant Minister to the Prime Minister for Digital Transformation	Minister for Digital Transformation; 2017–2019	Succeeded by None
