= West Australian Locomotive Engine Drivers' Firemen's and Cleaners' Union of Workers =

Railway union in Western Australia

West Australian Locomotive Engine Drivers' Firemen's and Cleaners' Union of Workers was a Western Australian railway union that existed for the twentieth century, and into the twenty first, before amalgamation with other transport unions. The union became known later as the Locomotive Engine Drivers’ Firemen’s and Cleaners’ Union of Western Australia

A number officials of the union went on to further involvement in Western Australian and Australian politics.

The publication of their awards, rules and classifications was in effect the identification of railway workers who were able to work as employees of the Western Australian Government Railways.

The main occupations covered by their industrial awards included:

Steam engine drivers
Firemen
Engine packers and trimmers
Washout men and their assistants
Cleaners

with separation into classes that were measured in most cases by length of service.

In the 1950s lists included trainee drivers.

== Strikes and arbitration cases ==
Throughout the twentieth century, train strikes and arbitration cases occurred in relation to wages and conditions.
