= Jim McClelland =

Australian politician

The Honourable Jim McClelland
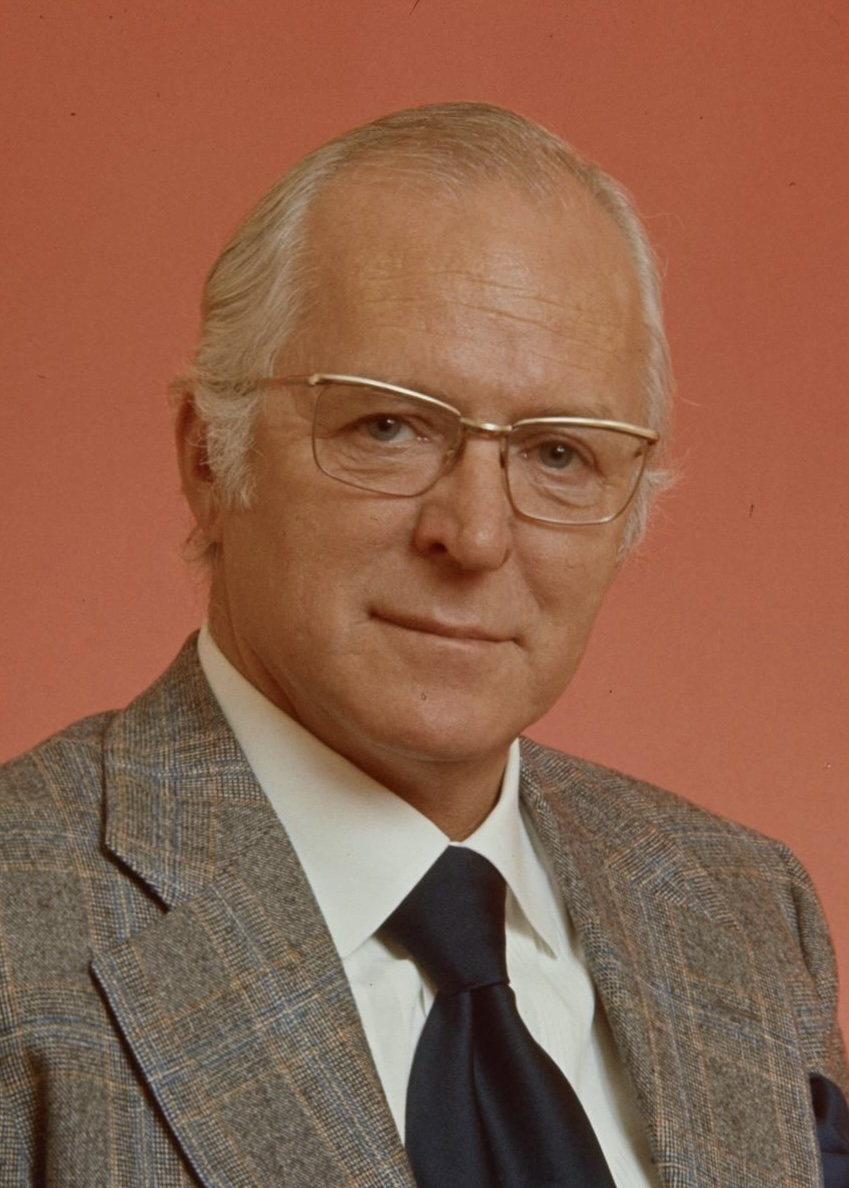

Chief Judge of the Land and Environment Court of New South Wales
- In office 14 April 1980 – 2 June 1985
- Preceded by: New office
- Succeeded by: Jerrold Cripps

Minister for Labor and Immigration
- In office 6 June 1975 – 11 November 1975
- Prime Minister: Gough Whitlam
- Preceded by: Clyde Cameron
- Succeeded by: Tony Street

Minister for Manufacturing Industry
- In office 10 February 1975 – 6 June 1975
- Prime Minister: Gough Whitlam
- Preceded by: Kep Enderby
- Succeeded by: Lionel Bowen

Senator for New South Wales
- In office 16 March 1971 – 21 July 1978
- Preceded by: James Ormonde
- Succeeded by: Kerry Sibraa

Personal details
- Born: 3 June 1915 Melbourne, Victoria, Australia
- Died: 16 January 1999 (aged 83) Wentworth Falls, New South Wales, Australia
- Party: Labor
- Spouse(s): Nora Fitzer (m. 1947; div. 1968) Freda Watson (m. 1968; died 1976) Gillian Appleton (m. 1978)
- Education: University of Melbourne; University of Sydney
- Occupation: Solicitor, unionist

James Robert McClelland (Note: Although he was nicknamed "Diamond Jim" by the Australian media, at McClelland's funeral, Gough Whitlam indicated that McClelland disliked this Americanism.) (3 June 1915 – 16 January 1999) was an Australian lawyer, politician, and judge. He was a member of the Australian Labor Party (ALP) and served as a Senator for New South Wales from 1971 to 1978. He briefly held ministerial office in the Whitlam government in 1975 as Minister for Manufacturing Industry and Minister for Labor and Immigration. He later served as the inaugural Chief Judge of the Land and Environment Court of New South Wales from 1980 to 1985, as well as presiding over the 1984 McClelland Royal Commission into British nuclear tests in Australia.

== Early life ==
McClelland was born in Melbourne on 3 June 1915. He was the son of Florence Ruby (née O'Connor) and Robert William McClelland. His father, of Ulster Scots descent, was a painter, paperhanger and signwriter with the Victorian Railways.

McClelland spent his early years in the Melbourne suburb of Glen Iris. In 1925 his father was transferred to Ballarat, where he attended St Patrick's College, Ballarat. He completed his secondary education on a scholarship at St Kevin's College, Melbourne, where he was a classmate of B. A. Santamaria. McClelland's parents had a mixed marriage and he was raised in his mother's Catholic faith. He considered training for the priesthood, but abandoned Catholicism as a young adult. McClelland won a scholarship to attend the University of Melbourne in 1932, but dropped out in 1934 and joined Victorian Railways as a clerk. He later re-enrolled as a part-time student and graduated Bachelor of Arts in 1936.

In 1940, McClelland began working as a labourer with Australian Iron & Steel. Identifying as a Trotskyist, he joined the Communist-dominated Federated Ironworkers' Association (FIA) and came under the influence of union leader Laurie Short and Marxist scholar Guido Baracchi. He later worked for ARC Engineering Company and was a shop steward, but in 1942 was expelled from the FIA for engaging in disruptive activities and terminated from his employment for "anti-war deviationism". His expulsion from the union was reportedly orchestrated by his rival Ernie Thornton.

In 1943, McClelland joined the Royal Australian Air Force (RAAF). He served as a leading aircraftman with radar units in Australia and was also stationed in New Guinea from 1945 to 1946. After the war's end he settled in Sydney, briefly running a beachside café in Manly. He subsequently enrolled to study law at the University of Sydney under the Commonwealth Reconstruction Training Scheme, graduating Bachelor of Laws in 1950. He was admitted to practise law in New South Wales in 1951 and established the firm of Boyland, McClelland and Company. Within a few years he had a "lucrative practice in industrial compensation law". He also represented Short from 1950 to 1952 in his successful attempts to remove the leadership of the FIA, briefing barrister and future governor-general John Kerr.

== Early political involvement ==
McClelland joined the Glen Iris branch of the Australian Labor Party (ALP) in 1941 and joined the Paddington branch after moving to Sydney. By the mid-1950s he had abandoned Trotskyism and was approached to join the anti-communist Democratic Labor Party, ultimately letting his ALP membership lapse.

In the early 1960s, McClelland joined the ALP's Mosman branch. He first stood for parliament at the 1966 election, running unsuccessfully in the safe Liberal seat of Warringah.

== Senate ==
McClelland was elected to represent New South Wales for the ALP in the 1970 Senate election, his term to begin on 1 July 1971. In March 1971 he was appointed to a casual vacancy for the remainder of the term of the late senator James Ormonde. He was again elected in the double dissolution election of May 1974. In the Third Whitlam Ministry he was Minister for Manufacturing Industry from 10 February to 6 June 1975. From 6 June to 11 November 1975 he was Minister for Labor and Immigration and Minister assisting the Prime Minister in matters relating to the Public Service. He was again elected at the December 1975 double dissolution election. According to an article by C. J. Coventry, McClelland had been an informer for the U.S. He resigned from the Senate on 21 July 1978.

== Later life ==
In 1980 McClelland was appointed the first chief judge of the Land and Environment Court of NSW, holding that office until his 70th birthday in June 1985.

In 1984, as Justice McClelland, he was President of the Royal Commission into British nuclear tests in Australia at Maralinga.

He was reviled by the right as is indicated in Roddy Meagher's portrait in Quadrant, and associated with Edmund Campion, Patrick White, Manning Clark and Donald Horne.

== Personal life ==
In 1947, McClelland married Nora Fitzer, a Harbin Russian of Jewish descent. The couple adopted two children together, one of whom predeceased him. They divorced in 1968 and in the same year he remarried to Freda Watson, who had three young children from a previous marriage. They settled in Darling Point where they were friends of author Patrick White. McClelland was widowed in 1976 and in 1978 married writer Gillian Appleton.

McClelland retired to Wentworth Falls in the Blue Mountains. He died at his home on 16 January 1999, aged 83.

== Bibliography ==
- Portraits: Jim McClelland, Quadrant, June 2005 – 49:6 [Accessed 4 March 2006]
- James McClelland, (1988), Stirring the Possum: A Political Autobiography, Penguin, Sydney ISBN 0-14-009764-3
- James McClelland, (1989), An Angel Bit The Bride Penguin ISBN 0-14-012831-X
- Gillian Appleton, (2000), Diamond Cuts: An Affectionate Memoir of Jim McClelland Macmillan ISBN 0-7329-1051-X

Political offices
Preceded by Kep Enderby	Minister for Manufacturing Industry; 1975	Succeeded by Lionel Bowen
Preceded by Clyde Cameron	Minister for Labour and Immigration; 1975	Succeeded by Tony Street

Legal offices
New title	Chief Judge of the Land and Environment Court (NSW); 1980–1985	Succeeded by Jerrold Cripps
