= Department of Employment and Industrial Relations (1975–1978) =

Australian government department, 1975–1978

Department overview
- Formed: 22 December 1975
- Preceding Department: Department of Labor and Immigration
- Dissolved: 5 December 1978
- Superseding Department: Department of Industrial Relations (I) – for all industrial relations functions Department of Employment and Youth Affairs – for Commonwealth Employment Service; industrial training; reinstatement in civil employment of national servicemen, members of the reserve forces and members of citizen forces Department of Administrative Services (II) – for Commonwealth hostel accommodation; migrant accommodation
- Jurisdiction: Commonwealth of Australia
- Headquarters: Canberra
- Minister responsible: Tony Street, Minister
- Department executive: Keith McKenzie, Secretary

The Department of Employment and Industrial Relations was an Australian government department that existed between December 1975 and December 1978.

== History ==
The department was announced in December 1975, separating the employment and industrial functions from the immigration functions in the previous Department of Labor and Immigration.

== Scope ==
Information about the department's functions and government funding allocation could be found in the Administrative Arrangements Orders, the annual Portfolio Budget Statements and in the department's annual reports.

At its creation, the department was responsible for the following:

- Industrial relations, including conciliation and arbitration in relation to industrial disputes
- Commonwealth Employment Service
- Re-instatement in civil employment of national servicemen, members of the Reserve Forces and members of the Citizen Forces.

== Structure ==
The department was an Australian Public Service department, staffed by officials who were responsible to the Minister for Employment and Industrial Relations, Tony Street. The Secretary of the department was Keith McKenzie.
