= Division of Stirling =

Australian federal electoral division

Coordinates: 31.877°S 115.818°E

Stirling Australian House of Representatives Division
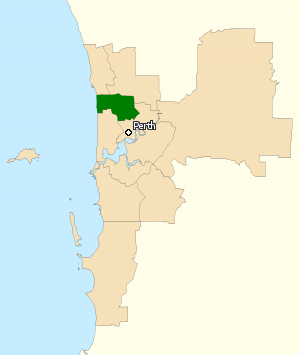
- Division of Stirling in Western Australia, as of the 2016 federal election
- Created: 1955
- Abolished: 2022
- Namesake: Sir James Stirling
- Electors: 100,781 (2019)
- Area: 74 km^{2} (28.6 sq mi)
- Demographic: Inner metropolitan

The Division of Stirling was an Australian electoral division in the inner northern and beachside suburbs of Perth, Western Australia, which included a large portion of the local government area of the City of Stirling.

== History ==
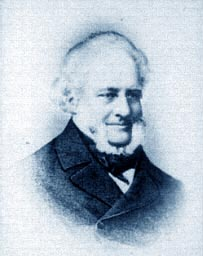
Sir James Stirling, the division's namesake

The electorate was created in the Western Australia redistribution of 10 August 1955, and was named after Sir James Stirling, the 19th-century founding lieutenant governor and governor of Western Australia. Stirling covered a demographically diverse area, including several affluent beachside suburbs, as well as working class areas further inland. As a result, Stirling was often a marginal seat, alternating between the Australian Labor Party and the Liberal Party of Australia.

Unlike some marginal seats on the east coast, such as Eden-Monaro, Stirling was not often seen as a reliable barometer for winning government. For example, longtime Labor member Harry Webb survived the massive Coalition landslide of 1966, only to become one of two Labor MPs from the state to be defeated in 1972 even as Labor ended 23 years of Coalition rule. While it elected five government MPs, all but three of its members have spent at least one term in opposition.

Besides Webb, who held the seat for all but one term from its creation in 1955 until his defeat in 1972, the seat's most prominent member was Labor's Ron Edwards, who was Deputy Speaker of the House of Representatives from 29 August 1989 to 8 February 1993. It had been expected that if the 1993 election had not been called so soon after Leo McLeay's resignation as Speaker or if Edwards had held his seat in the election upon the re-election of the Keating government, Edwards would have been elected Speaker.

Opinion polls in the leadup to the 2004 election had suggested a close result in Stirling, leaning towards the possibility of sitting Labor member Jann McFarlane retaining her seat. This was thought to have been more likely after Paul Afkos, the original Liberal candidate, was forced to resign after he was revealed to have borrowed money from a convicted drug dealer. A local businessman, Michael Keenan, was brought in as his replacement, and maintained the close difference in polling. However, on election day, the swing to the Liberal Party both statewide and nationwide was stronger than expected, and Keenan was ultimately successful in unseating McFarlane. The Stirling Times, a local newspaper, speculated in October 2006 that McFarlane, at that time a Stirling councillor, might contest the seat again in 2007. On 28 November 2006, former SAS officer and outspoken opponent of the Iraq War Peter Tinley accepted an offer from Kim Beazley to run as the ALP candidate in the 2007 election. Ahead of the 2010 election, Labor preselected Louise Durack, a social worker and executive director of People With Disabilities (WA) and past candidate for the state seat of Ocean Reef, to run for the seat. Keenan was re-elected at the 2010 federal election.

It was confirmed in June 2021 that this division would be abolished at the 2022 federal election, with its area redistributed to the neighbouring divisions of Cowan, Curtin, Moore and Perth.

== Geography ==
Since 1984, federal electoral division boundaries in Australia have been determined at redistributions by a redistribution committee appointed by the Australian Electoral Commission. Redistributions occur for the boundaries of divisions in a particular state, and they occur every seven years, or sooner if a state's representation entitlement changes or when divisions of a state are malapportioned.

The division included the northern majority of the City of Stirling and a small portion of the City of Bayswater. Suburbs included

- Balcatta
- Balga
- Carine
- Dianella (part)
- Gwelup
- Hamersley
- Joondanna
- Karrinyup (part)
- Mirrabooka
- Morley (part)
- Nollamara
- North Beach
- Osborne Park (part)
- Scarborough (part)
- Stirling
- Trigg
- Tuart Hill
- Watermans Bay
- Westminster
- Yokine

In the redistribution that resulted in Stirling's abolition, the suburbs it contained west of the Mitchell Freeway were divided into two. In the north, the suburbs of Carine and Watermans Bay and the northern areas of Gwelup, Karrinyup and Trigg were allocated to Moore, while in the south, the remaining southern portions of Gwelup, Karrinyup and Trigg, along with Stirling's portion of Scarborough, were allocated to Curtin. East of the Mitchell Freeway, the southern fringe of the electorate, containing the suburbs of Joondanna, Tuart Hill and Yokine, along with the southern portion of Dianella, the south-east of Osborne Park, and Stirling's section of Morley, were allocated to Perth. The remainder of the electorate, approximately half of its total area, and including the suburbs of Balcatta, Balga, Hamersley, Mirrabooka, Nollamara, Stirling, and Westminster, along with the northern sections of Dianella and Morley and the north-east of Osborne Park, were allocated to Cowan.

== Members ==
Image	Member	Party	Term	Notes
	Harry Webb (1908–2000)	Labor	10 December 1955 – 22 November 1958	Previously held the Division of Swan. Lost seat
	Doug Cash (1919–2002)	Liberal	22 November 1958 – 9 December 1961	Lost seat. Later elected to the Western Australian Legislative Assembly seat of Mirrabooka in 1968
	Harry Webb (1908–2000)	Labor	9 December 1961 – 2 December 1972	Lost seat
	Ian Viner (1933–)	Liberal	2 December 1972 – 5 March 1983	Served as minister under Fraser. Lost seat
	Ron Edwards (1945–)	Labor	5 March 1983 – 13 March 1993	Lost seat
	Eoin Cameron (1951–2016)	Liberal	13 March 1993 – 3 October 1998	Lost seat
	Jann McFarlane (1944–)	Labor	3 October 1998 – 9 October 2004	Lost seat
	Michael Keenan (1972–)	Liberal	9 October 2004 – 11 April 2019	Served as minister under Abbott, Turnbull and Morrison. Retired
	Vince Connelly (1978–)	Liberal	18 May 2019 – 11 April 2022	Failed to win the Division of Cowan when Stirling was abolished in 2022

== Election results ==
2019 Australian federal election: Stirling
Party	Candidate	Votes	%	±%
Liberal	Vince Connelly	40,757	46.97	−2.48
Labor	Melita Markey	27,623	31.83	−0.34
Greens	Judith Cullity	10,439	12.03	+0.35
One Nation	Angus Young	3,129	3.61	+3.61
Western Australia	Elizabeth Re	1,750	2.02	+2.02
United Australia	Dorothy Hutton	1,577	1.82	+1.82
Christians	Kevin Host	1,504	1.73	−0.71
Total formal votes		86,779	95.32	−0.53
Informal votes		4,259	4.68	+0.53
Turnout		91,038	89.97	+2.24
Two-party-preferred result
Liberal	Vince Connelly	48,289	55.65	−0.47
Labor	Melita Markey	38,490	44.35	+0.47
Liberal hold		Swing	−0.47	
