= Benjamin Tregoe =

American management scientist

- Born: December 23, 1927; San Francisco, California, United States
- Died: April 20, 2005 (aged 77)
- Education: Whittier College (B.A.), Harvard University (Ph.D.)
- Occupations: Management consultant, author, social scientist
- Known for: Co-development of the Kepner-Tregoe Method for problem-solving and decision-making
- Spouse: Jeannette Tregoe
- Children: 3 (Cynthia, Elizabeth, Benjamin B. III)
- Website: kepner-tregoe.com

Benjamin Tregoe (December 23, 1927 – April 20, 2005) was an American management scientist and management consultant who was the co-founder of Kepner–Tregoe, a management consulting firm, where he served as chairman emeritus until his death in 2005. Tregoe helped found the company in 1958 with fellow RAND Corporation employee Charles Kepner based on their research on rational decision making and problem solving.

== Early life and education ==
Tregoe was born in San Francisco, California in 1927 and received a bachelor's degree from Whittier College and a PhD in sociology from Harvard University. In 1990, he received an honorary LL.D. from Whittier College.

He also sat on the board of directors of The J.M. Smucker Company, Whittier College, the World Affairs Council of Philadelphia, the National Alliance of Business, and served as chairman of the Advisory Committee to the Dean of the Graduate School of Arts and Sciences of Harvard University.

== Published works ==
In addition to lecturing, Tregoe also wrote books on management methodology and decision making. His most well-known book is The Rational Manager (1965).

Other texts include:

- Top Management Strategy (1980)
- Vision in Action: Putting a Winning Strategy to Work (1990)
- The New Rational Manager: An Updated Edition for a New World (1997)
- Analytic Processes for School Leaders (2001).

== Tregoe Education Forum ==
In 1993, Benjamin Tregoe established the non-profit Tregoe Education Forum (renamed TregoED in 2010). He served as its chairman until his death in 2005.
