= Clyde Cameron =

Australian politician (1913–2008)

The Honourable Clyde Cameron AO
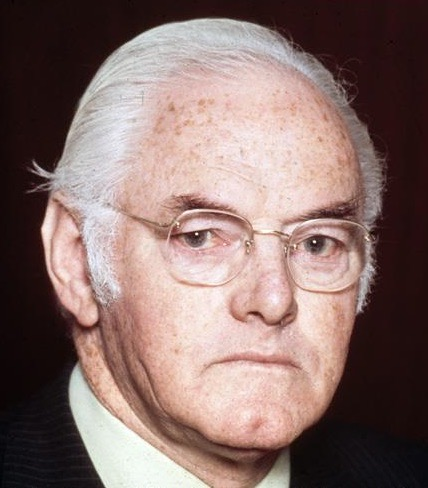

Minister for Science and Consumer Affairs
- In office 6 June 1975 – 11 November 1975
- Prime Minister: Gough Whitlam
- Preceded by: Bill Morrison
- Succeeded by: Bob Cotton

Minister for Labor and Immigration
- In office 12 June 1974 – 6 June 1975
- Prime Minister: Gough Whitlam
- Preceded by: Himself (Labour); Al Grassby (Immigration)
- Succeeded by: Jim McClelland

Minister for Labour
- In office 19 December 1972 – 12 June 1974
- Prime Minister: Gough Whitlam
- Preceded by: Phillip Lynch
- Succeeded by: Himself (Labour and Immigration)

Father of the House
- In office 11 November 1977 – 19 September 1980
- Preceded by: Kim Beazley Sr.
- Succeeded by: Sir William McMahon

Member of the Australian Parliament for Hindmarsh
- In office 10 December 1949 – 19 September 1980
- Preceded by: Albert Thompson
- Succeeded by: John Scott

Personal details
- Born: 11 February 1913 Murray Bridge, South Australia, Australia
- Died: 14 March 2008 (aged 95) Tennyson, South Australia, Australia
- Party: Labor
- Spouses: Ruby Krahe (m. 1939; div. 1966) Dorothy Bradbury (m. 1967)
- Relations: Don Cameron (brother); Terry Cameron (nephew)
- Occupation: Shearer, unionist

Clyde Robert Cameron, AO (11 February 1913 – 14 March 2008) was an Australian politician. He was a member of the Australian Labor Party (ALP) and served in the House of Representatives from 1949 to 1980, representing the Division of Hindmarsh. He was a leading figure in the Australian labour movement and held ministerial office in the Whitlam government as Minister for Labour (1972–1974), Labor and Immigration (1974–1975), and Science and Consumer Affairs (1975).

== Early life ==
Cameron was born in Murray Bridge, South Australia, the son of a shearer of Scottish descent. He was educated at Gawler but left school at 14 to work as a shearer. During the very worst years of the Great Depression, he was unemployed, and the experience of joblessness was one that he never forgot or forgave. When he finally got work, later in the 1930s, he ended up having to travel to every Australian state and also to New Zealand. He was active in the Australian Workers' Union and the Australian Labor Party from an early age, becoming an AWU organiser and then South Australian State President and a federal vice-president of the union in 1941. From 1943 to 1948, he was the union's industrial advocate and taught himself industrial law. In 1946, he became State President of the Labor Party.

In 1939, Cameron married Ruby Krahe (always called "Cherie") with whom he had three children (twins Warren and Tania, and a second son Noel). In 1949, he suffered a personal crisis when all three children were affected by poliomyelitis (infantile paralysis). He also learned that his youngest son had an intellectual disability. Although they all eventually recovered from polio, the ordeal permanently affected Cameron and contributed to the breakup of his marriage. In 1966, the Camerons were divorced and in 1967, he remarried, now to Dorothy Bradbury.

He was the uncle of Terry Cameron.

== Early political career ==
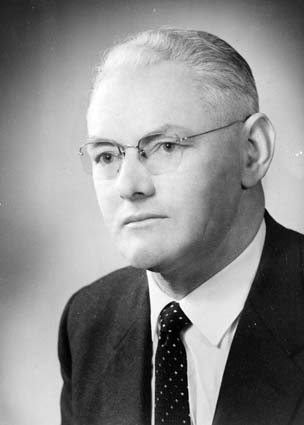
Clyde Cameron c. 1960

Cameron was the most powerful figure in the South Australian labour movement in the years immediately after World War II. At the 1949 election, he was elected to the House of Representatives for the safe Labor seat of Hindmarsh and left his brother Don (later a senator) in charge of the South Australian AWU. He rapidly made his mark as one of the most aggressive and uncompromising Labor members ever to enter the Australian Parliament. Cameron regarded the conservatives with a deep and personal hatred and made no secret of it. He rapidly emerged as one of the leaders of the left wing of the Caucus, led at that time by Eddie Ward, who became Cameron's mentor. Nonetheless, he was an intelligent and able parliamentarian.

It was the tragedy of Labor politicians of Cameron's generation that Labor spent almost a quarter of a century in Opposition, from 1949 to 1972, with the result that Cameron, like many others, spent his best years out of office. During the Labor Split of the 1950s, Cameron became a leading supporter of federal Labor Leader Dr H.V. Evatt and an opponent of the right-wing Catholic faction. He was among those who insisted for all the "Groupers" to be expelled from the party. He also conducted a long feud with the right-wing (but anti-Grouper) federal leadership of the AWU led by Tom Dougherty, one of a long list of people whom Cameron detested.

By the 1960s, Cameron realised Labor would never win a federal election again unless it could find both a leader and a set of policies acceptable to an increasingly middle-class electorate. Ward's death in 1963 marked the end of the old Depression-era leftism in the federal Caucus. The younger leftist leaders such as Cameron, Jim Cairns and Tom Uren were sober enough to adapt to the changed circumstances. Cameron became increasingly critical of Arthur Calwell's leadership but supported Calwell in his passionately opposing the Vietnam War.

Calwell retired in 1967 and was succeeded by Gough Whitlam. Although he disagreed with Whitlam on many issues, after 1968, Cameron became a supporter of Whitlam's leadership. In 1969, Whitlam made Cameron Shadow Minister for Employment. Cameron's decisive influence helped Whitlam gain control of the Federal Executive. In 1970 he supported Whitlam's intervention in the Labor Party's Victorian branch which was controlled by the extreme left.

== Cabinet minister ==
At the December 1972 election Labor came to office under Whitlam, and Cameron became Minister for Labour at the age of 59. He created a sensation by dismissing the permanent head of his department, Sir Halford Cook and bringing in an outsider; he was always deeply suspicious of senior public servants. However, he greatly improved the pay and conditions of other public servants by using the public sector to set new benchmarks, which he hoped would be extended to the private sector. Revealing himself to be an unsuspected feminist, he hired Mary Gaudron (later the first woman on the High Court bench) to argue before the Arbitration Commission for equal pay for women workers. His senior advisor was John Bannon, later Premier of South Australia. Following Al Grassby's defeat at the 1974 election, Cameron became Minister for Labour and Immigration.

The unions had high hopes that Cameron would bring greatly improved benefits for industrial workers. Unfortunately for Cameron, the Australian economy began to deteriorate rapidly in 1974, as a result of the inflation caused by the oil shock, and the government came under increasing pressure to hold back wage increases, which were seen by orthodox economists to be fuelling inflation. Cameron resisted that pressure, and his relations with Whitlam deteriorated. At the same time, he became increasingly critical of the more irresponsible union leaders, who, he believed, blindly pursued wage rises without regard to the state of the economy or to the incomes policy of their own Labor government. Still, in the twelve months from September 1973, Cameron claimed to have presided over "the greatest redistribution in the favour of wage earners ever to be recorded in any one year by any country in the world."

By 1975 the Whitlam government was in crisis and Whitlam reshuffled the cabinet by bringing in Bill Hayden as Treasurer and Jim McClelland as Minister for Labour and Immigration. Cameron refused to resign as Labour and Immigration Minister, and Whitlam was forced to ask the Governor-General, Sir John Kerr, to withdraw his commission. He was eventually persuaded to accept the position of Minister for Science and Consumer Affairs.

Cameron thus became once again Whitlam's implacable enemy, but with the dismissal of Whitlam's government in November, there was little he could do. He withdrew to the backbench, where he remained for the next five years until he retired from Parliament, after the 1980 election.

== After politics ==
Cameron was involved in the Georgist movement and wrote for the Georgist Education Association.

In the 1982 Australia Day Honours, he was appointed an Officer of the Order of Australia.

Clyde Cameron College was run by the Australian Trade Union Training Authority from 1977 until its abolition in 1996.

Well into his last years, he remained a frequent contributor to public debate, uttering various remarks showing a surprisingly respectful attitude towards his contemporary and former antagonist B. A. Santamaria. The two men never met, but when Santamaria died in 1998, Cameron (as reported by the Santamaria-founded magazine News Weekly) paid him a warm tribute by saying that "his soul was not for sale." Inspired by his marathon interview with Ashforth, Cameron contacted Santamaria and the two sat for dozens of hours of taped discussions. Cameron went on to interview other colleagues and rivals, adding to the extraordinary archive for which he will ultimately be best remembered.

He was awarded the Centenary Medal in 2001.

Cameron died at his home on Sunlake Place in Tennyson, South Australia, at age 95. He was survived by three children, six grandchildren, 11 great-grandchildren and one great-great-grandchild.

== Bibliography ==
- Daniel Connell, The Confessions of Clyde Cameron 1913-1990, ABC Enterprises 1990
- Bill Guy, A Life on the Left: A Biography of Clyde Cameron, Wakefield Press 1999

Political offices
Preceded by Phillip Lynch	Minister for Labour; 1972–1974	Succeeded by Jim McClelland
Preceded by Al Grassby	Minister for Labour and Immigration; 1974–1975	Succeeded by Jim McClelland
Preceded by Bill Morrison	Minister for Science and Consumer Affairs; 1975	Succeeded by Bob Cotton
Parliament of Australia
Preceded by Albert Thompson	Member for Hindmarsh; 1949–1980	Succeeded by John Scott
Honorary titles
Preceded by Kim Beazley Sr.	Father of the House of Representatives; 1977–1980	Succeeded by Sir William McMahon
Preceded by Kim Beazley Sr.	Earliest serving living MP; 2007 – 2008	Succeeded by Bill Grayden
