= Department of Administrative Services =

Department of Administrative Services may refer to one of the following government agencies:

== Australia ==
- Department of Administrative Services (1975)
- Department of Administrative Services (1975–1984)
- Department of Local Government and Administrative Services (1984–1987)
- Department of Administrative Services (1987–1993)
- Department of the Arts and Administrative Services (1993–1994)
- Department of Administrative Services (1994–1997)

== United States ==
- Connecticut Department of Administrative Services
- New Hampshire Department of Administrative Services
- New York City Department of Citywide Administrative Services
- Ohio Department of Administrative Services
- Oregon Department of Administrative Services
