= Geoscience Australia =

Agency of the Australian Government

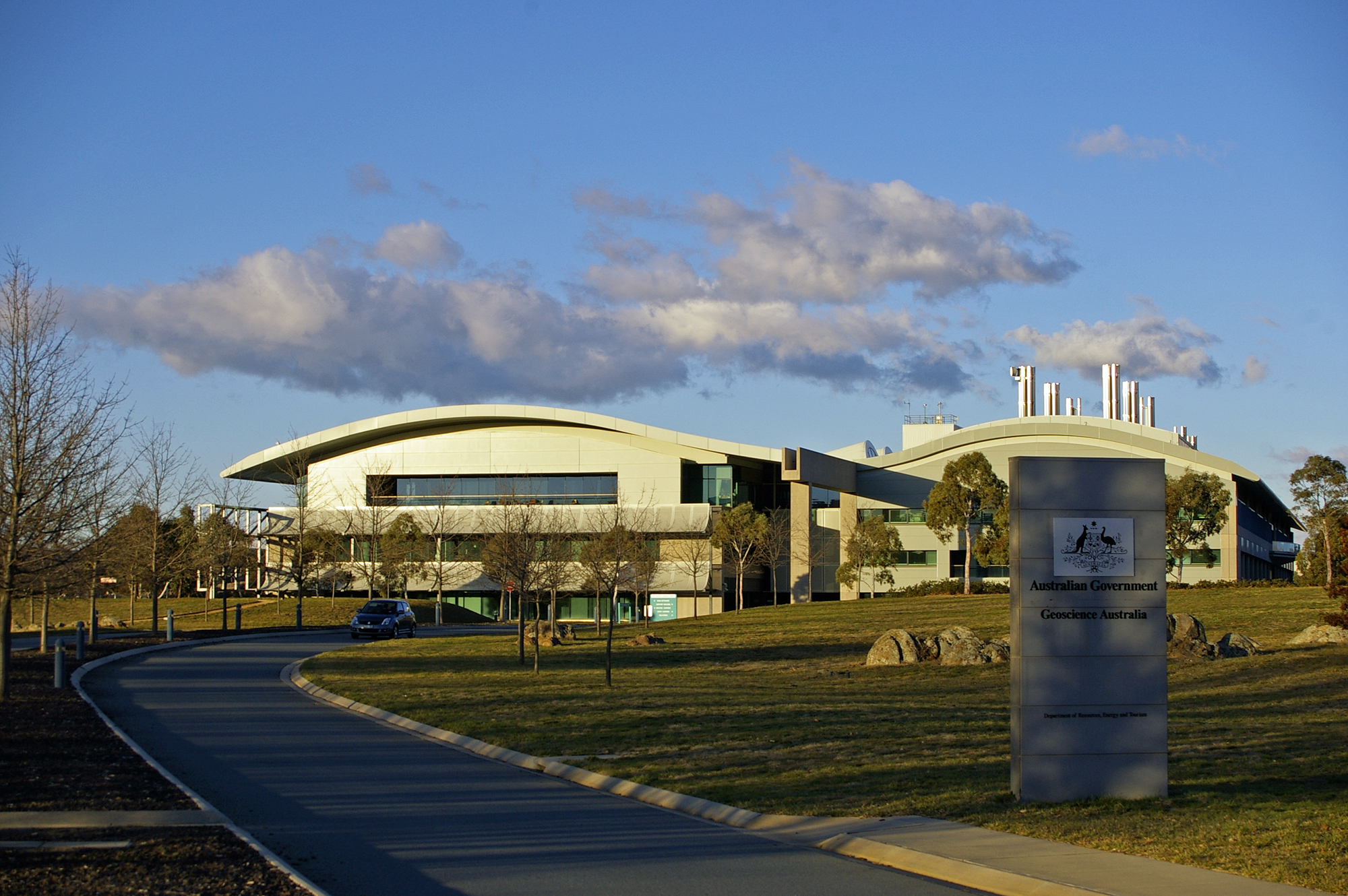
- Geoscience Australia headquarters located in the Canberra suburb of Symonston

Agency overview
- Formed: 2001
- Preceding agencies: Australian Surveying and Land Information Group; Australian Geological Survey Organisation
- Jurisdiction: Australia
- Headquarters: Symonston, Canberra, Australian Capital Territory; 35°20′36″S 149°09′30″E
- Employees: 671 (as at 30 June 2023)
- Annual budget: $207.3 million (2020)
- Minister responsible: Madeleine King, Minister for Resources
- Agency executive: Melissa Harris, Chief Executive Officer
- Parent department: Department of Industry, Science & Resources
- Website: ga.gov.au

Geoscience Australia is a statutory agency of the Australian Government that conducts geoscientific research. The agency is the government's technical adviser on aspects of geoscience, and serves as the repository of geographic and geological data collated by the Commonwealth.

On a user pays basis, the agency offers geospatial services, including topographic maps and satellite imagery. It is also a major contributor to the Australian Government's free, open data collections such as data.gov.au and portal.ga.gov.au.

== Strategic priorities ==
The agency has six strategic priority areas:

1. building Australia's resource wealth in order to maximise benefits from Australia's minerals and energy resources, now and into the future;
2. ensuring Australia's community safety so that Australian communities are more resilient to natural hazards;
3. securing Australia's water resources in order to optimise and sustain the use of Australia's water resources;
4. managing Australia's marine jurisdictions in order to maximise benefits from the sustainable use of Australia's marine jurisdiction;
5. providing fundamental geographic information in order to understand the location and timing of processes, activities and changes across Australia to inform decision-making for both natural and built environments; and
6. maintaining geoscience knowledge and capability in order to maintain an enduring and accessible knowledge base and capability to enable evidence-based policy and decision-making by government, industry and the community.

== History ==
Geoscience Australia came into being in 2001 when the Australian Surveying & Land Information Group (AUSLIG) merged with the Australian Geological Survey Organisation (AGSO). Its history dates back almost to the Federation in 1901 when it was decided to set aside land for the national capital. This decision led to the establishment of the Australian Survey Office in 1910, when surveying began for the Australian Capital Territory.

AUSLIG's main function was to provide national geographic information. It was formed in 1987 when the Australian Survey Office joined with the Division of National Mapping, which was formed in 1947. Another important component of AUSLIG was the provision of satellite imagery to industry and government, started by the Australian Landsat Station in 1979, and renamed the Australian Centre for Remote Sensing (ACRES) in 1986.

AGSO's predecessor organisation the Bureau of Mineral Resources, Geology and Geophysics (BMR) was established in 1946; with the name changing to AGSO in 1992.

The BMR was a geological survey with the main objective being the systematic geological and geophysical mapping of the continent as the basis for informed mineral exploration.

Geoscience Australia's activities have expanded and today it has responsibility for meeting the Australian Government's geoscience requirements. This role takes the Agency well beyond its historic focus on resource development and topographic mapping to topics as diverse as natural hazards such as tsunamis and earthquakes, environmental issues, including the impacts of climate change, groundwater research, marine and coastal research, carbon capture and storage and vegetation monitoring as well as Earth observations from space. Geoscience Australia's remit also extends beyond the Australian landmass to Australia's vast marine jurisdiction.

=== Summary of predecessor agencies ===
Predecessor agencies
Name of agency	Start	End	Responsible department
Lands and Survey Branch	1911	1932	Department of Home Affairs (1911–1916)
Lands and Survey Branch	1911	1932	Department of Home and Territories (1916–1925)
Lands and Survey Branch	1911	1932	Department of Works & Railways (1925–1932)
Property and Survey Branch	1932	1951	Department of the Interior (1932–1938)
Property and Survey Branch	1932	1951	Department of Works (1938–1939)
Property and Survey Branch	1932	1951	Department of the Interior (1939–1951)
1951: surveying and mapping functions separated
Surveying agencies
ACT Development and Planning Branch	1951	1958	Department of the Interior (1939–1972)
Lands and Survey Branch	1958	1963	Department of the Interior (1939–1972)
Survey Branch	1963	1974	
Survey Branch	1963	1974	Department of Services and Property (1972–1975)
Survey Division	1974	1975	Department of Services and Property (1972–1975)
Australian Survey Office	1975	1987	Department of Urban and Regional Development (1975)
Australian Survey Office	1975	1987	Department of Administrative Services (1975–1984)
Australian Survey Office	1975	1987	Department of Local Government and Administrative Services (1984–1987)
Mapping agencies
National Mapping Section	1951	1956	Department of the Interior
Division of National Mapping	1956	1987	Department of National Development (1956–1972)
Division of National Mapping	1956	1987	Department of Minerals and Energy (1972–1975)
Division of National Mapping	1956	1987	Department of National Resources (1975–1977)
Division of National Mapping	1956	1987	Department of National Development (1977–1979)
Division of National Mapping	1956	1987	Department of National Development and Energy (1979–1983)
Division of National Mapping	1956	1987	Department of Resources and Energy (1983–1987)
1987: surveying and mapping functions reunited
Australian Surveying and Land Information Group	1987	2001	Department of Administrative Services (1987–1993)
Australian Surveying and Land Information Group	1987	2001	Department of the Arts and Administrative Services (1993–1994)
Australian Surveying and Land Information Group	1987	2001	Department of Administrative Services (1994–1997)
Australian Surveying and Land Information Group	1987	2001	Department of Industry, Science and Tourism (1997–1998)
Australian Surveying and Land Information Group	1987	2001	Department of Industry, Science and Resources (1998–2001)
Australian Surveying and Land Information Group	1987	2001	Department of Industry, Tourism and Resources (2001–2007)
Geoscience Australia	2001		Department of Industry, Tourism and Resources (2001–2007)
Geoscience Australia	2001		Department of Resources, Energy and Tourism (2007–2013)
Geoscience Australia	2001		Department of Industry (2013–2014)
Geoscience Australia	2001		Department of Industry and Science (2014–2015)
Geoscience Australia	2001		Department of Industry, Innovation and Science (2015–2020)
Geoscience Australia	2001		Department of Industry, Science, Energy and Resources (2020–2022)
Geoscience Australia	2001		Department of Industry, Science and Resources (2022–present)

== Facilities ==
It has a free place name search and its earthquake monitoring services can be freely accessed. The Library is the premier geoscience library in Australia providing services to geoscience organisations, universities, research centres, the mining and petroleum industries and the public.

== Economic Demonstrated Resources ==
Geoscience Australia defines Economic Demonstrated Resources (EDR) as

resources for which profitable extraction or production under defined investment assumptions is possible

—

For EDR, tonnages and grades are computed from samples of the resource taken from points spaced to provide assured resource continuity.

== See also ==
- Joint Geological and Geophysical Research Station
- Geological Survey of South Australia
- Geological Survey of Western Australia
- List of national mapping agencies
