= Federal district =

Title for some administrative divisions

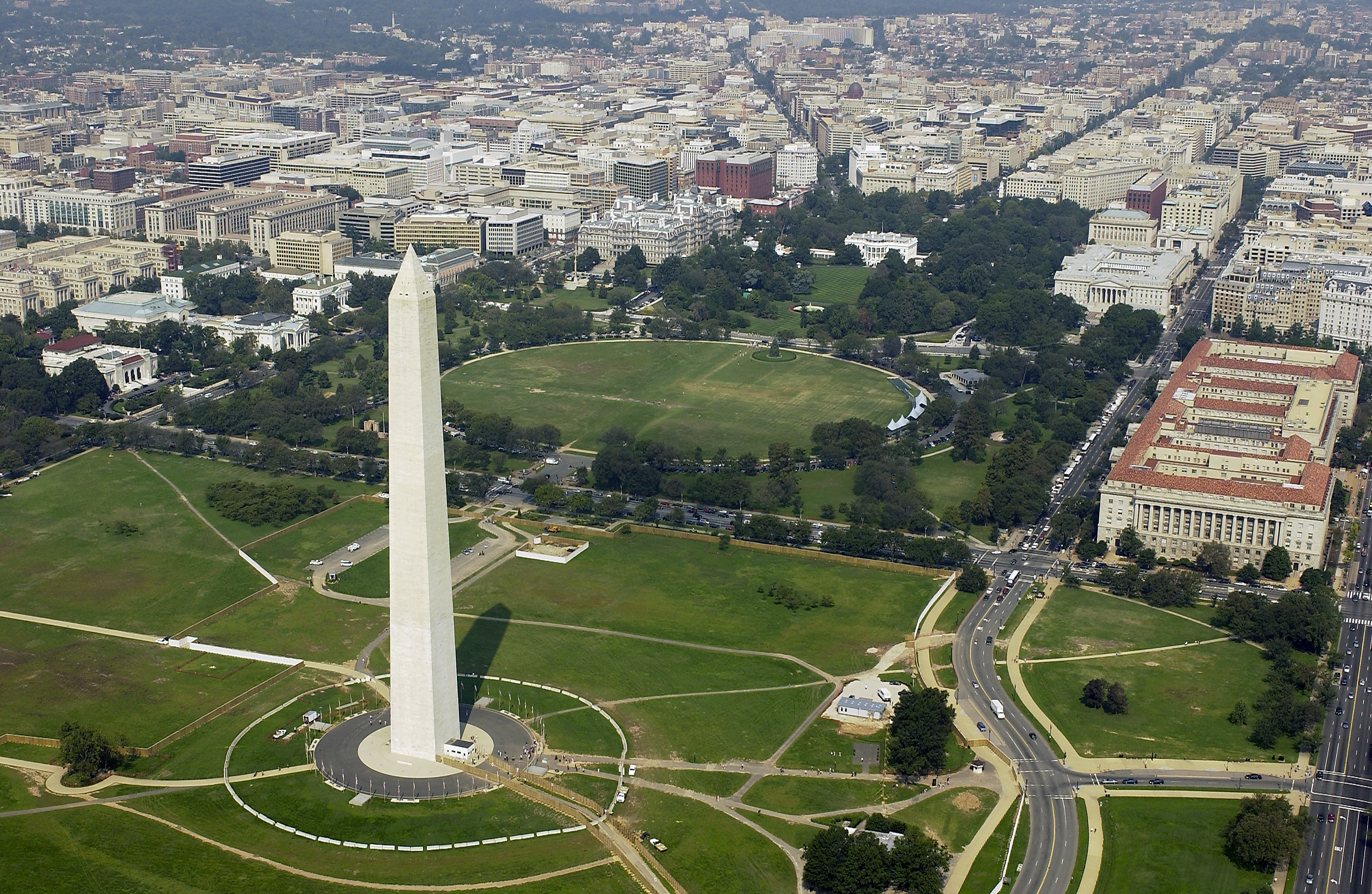
A bird’s eye view of the Washington Monument and the surrounding area of Washington, D.C.

A federal district is a specific administrative division in one of various federations. These districts may be under the direct jurisdiction of a federation's national government, as in the case of federal territory (e.g., India, Malaysia), or they may function as ordinary federated units (e.g., Brazil, Russia). Federal districts often include capital districts.

== Countries ==
=== Current ===
==== Brazil ====
The Federal District (Portuguese: Distrito Federal) contains the Brazilian capital Brasília.

==== India ====
In India, the term "Union Territory" is used for the eight territories governed directly by the Union government (also called central government), administered by a Lieutenant Governor or an Administrator: Andaman and Nicobar Islands, Chandigarh, Dadra and Nagar Haveli and Daman and Diu, Delhi, Jammu and Kashmir, Ladakh, Lakshadweep and Puducherry. Of these, Delhi, Jammu and Kashmir, and Puducherry possess self-government with their own elected legislatures and Chief Ministers.

==== Malaysia ====
In Malaysia, the term Wilayah Persekutuan (Federal Territory) is used for the three territories governed directly by the federal government: Kuala Lumpur (national capital), Putrajaya (federal government administrative centre) and Labuan (international offshore financial centre).

==== Nigeria ====
The Federal Capital Territory is a federal territory in central Nigeria. Abuja, the capital city of Nigeria, is located in this territory. The Federal Capital Territory was formed in 1976 from parts of the states of Nasarawa, Niger and Kogi. It is within the Middle Belt region of the country. It is administered by the Federal Capital Territory Administration, headed by a minister appointed by the President.

==== Pakistan ====
In Pakistan, the term Federal Territory is used for the five zones and 12 union councils of Islamabad governed directly by the state government as Islamabad Capital Territory.

==== Russia ====
Russia has three Federal Cities, established by the Constitution: Moscow, Saint Petersburg and Sevastopol, with the latter internationally recognised as being under Russian occupation. Each city is treated as a separate federal subject and has its own legislative body. Russia also has federal districts, but these form an additional administrative layer between the federation government and the federal subjects rather than being a distinct type of jurisdiction.

==== United States ====
The seat of the U.S. federal government is in Washington, D.C., the sole U.S. federal district, officially called the "District of Columbia" (D.C.). Other federally administered areas that are within one of the 50 states, but not under its jurisdiction, are called federal enclaves.

Additionally, the U.S. federal court system divides each state, the District of Columbia, and Puerto Rico into one or more federal judicial districts. A United States district court and a bankruptcy court are located in each. There are also regional federal judicial circuits, each consisting of a group of states (except for the District of Columbia Circuit, which consists of the federal district, and the Federal Circuit, whose jurisdiction is based on specific subject matter instead of geography); Puerto Rico and the United States territorial courts are also assigned to circuits. Each circuit has a United States court of appeals.

==== Venezuela ====
Capital District (Venezuela), where the Venezuelan capital Caracas is located.

=== Former ===
==== Argentina ====
The capital, Buenos Aires, used to be a Federal District. It was converted into the Autonomous City of Buenos Aires in 1994.

==== Australia ====
The Jervis Bay Territory is an internal territory of the Commonwealth of Australia, surrendered by the state of New South Wales in 1915 to the Commonwealth Government so that the landlocked Australian Capital Territory would have maritime access. Due to the terms of the Jervis Bay Territory Acceptance Act, the laws of the ACT apply to the Jervis Bay Territory, and it was administered by the Department of the Interior (and later by the Department of the Capital Territory) as if it were part of the Australian Capital Territory, although it has always been a separate Commonwealth territory. In 1988, when the ACT achieved self-government by the Australian Capital Territory (Self-Government) Act, the Department of the Arts, Sport, the Environment, Tourism and Territories took over responsibility for the JBT's administration, and it has since been administered by various Commonwealth departments responsible to the Minister for Territories.

==== Mexico ====
The former Federal District (Spanish: Distrito Federal or D.F.) was officially converted into Mexico City (Ciudad de México or CDMX) in January 2016.

== See also ==
- Direct-controlled municipality
- Federal territory
- Federated state
