= Department of Territories and Local Government =

Australian government department, 1983–1984

Department overview
- Formed: 11 March 1983
- Preceding Department: Department of the Capital Territory – for the administration of the ACT and Jervis Bay Department of Administrative Services (II) – for Christmas Island Agreement Acts Department of National Development and Energy – for local government Department of Home Affairs and Environment – for the administration of overseas territories and residual Northern Territory function Department of the Prime Minister and Cabinet – for Local Government (Personal Income Tax Sharing) Act 1976
- Dissolved: 13 December 1984
- Superseding Department: Department of Territories (II) – for territories Department of Local Government and Administrative Services – for local government
- Jurisdiction: Commonwealth of Australia
- Headquarters: Canberra
- Department executives: Tony Blunn, Secretary (1983); John Enfield, Secretary (1983–1984)

The Department of Territories and Local Government was an Australian government department that existed between March 1983 and December 1984.

== Scope ==
Information about the department's functions and government funding allocation could be found in the Administrative Arrangements Orders, the annual Portfolio Budget Statements and in the department's annual reports.

According to the Administrative Arrangements Order made on 11 March 1983, the department dealt with the following principal matters:

- Administration of the Australian Capital Territory, the Jervis Bay Territory, the Territory of Cocos (Keeling) Islands, the Territory of Christmas Island, the Coral Seas Islands Territory and the Territory of Ashmore and Cartier Islands, as well as Commonwealth responsibilities on Norfolk Island.
- Constitutional development of the Northern Territory of Australia.
- Matters relating to local government.

== Structure ==
The department was an Australian Public Service department, staffed by officials who were responsible to the Minister for Territories and Local Government, Tom Uren.

The department was divided into six divisions. The department was headed by a secretary, initially Tony Blunn (until 3 May 1983), and then J.D. Enfield (from 24 May 1983).
