= Department of Territories =

Department of Territories may refer to:

- Department of Territories (1951–68), an Australian government department
- Department of Territories (1984–87), an Australian government department
