= Bruce MacDonald (public servant) =

Australian public servant

Secretary of the Department of Sport, Recreation and Tourism
- In office 11 March 1983 – 24 July 1987

Personal details
- Occupation: Public servant

Bruce MacDonald is a former senior Australian public servant best known for his time as Secretary of the Department of Sport, Recreation and Tourism.

== Biography ==
From 1971 to 1977, MacDonald was Secretary of the Public Service Board.

In 1983, he was appointed as permanent head of the new Department of Sport, Recreation and Tourism. In 1986, MacDonald was said to have been tipped by insiders for the position of Commonwealth Ombudsman, but media reported that opposition was strong to any appointment of a bureaucrat to the position, and MacDonald stayed in his Secretary position. MacDonald was moved in 1987 instead for a senior position in the Data Protection Agency.

In May 1988, MacDonald was appointed special consultant to the Department of the Arts, Sport, the Environment, Tourism and Territories.

Government offices
Preceded by Tom Hayes as Secretary of the Department of Industry and Commerce	Secretary of the Department of Sport, Recreation and Tourism; 1983 – 1987	Succeeded by Tony Blunn as Secretary of the Department of the Arts, Sport, the Environment, Tourism and Territories
Preceded by Pat Galvin as Secretary of the Department of Home Affairs and Environment	Secretary of the Department of Sport, Recreation and Tourism; 1983 – 1987	Succeeded by Tony Blunn as Secretary of the Department of the Arts, Sport, the Environment, Tourism and Territories
