= Bruce MacDonald =

Bruce MacDonald may refer to:

- Bruce MacDonald (athlete) (1927-2020), American Olympic racewalker
- Bruce MacDonald (public servant), Australian public servant
- Bruce MacDonald (sailor) (born 1960), Canadian Olympic sailor
- Bruce E. MacDonald (born 1956), American admiral
- David Bruce MacDonald, Canadian political scientist

== See also ==
- Bruce McDonald (disambiguation)
