= Kenneth Norman Jones =

Australian public servant (1924–2022)

Kenneth Norman Jones AO CBE

Secretary of the Department of Local Government and Administrative Services
- In office 13 December 1984 – 24 July 1987

Secretary of the Department of Administrative Services
- In office 25 March 1983 – 12 December 1984

Secretary of the Department of Education and Youth Affairs
- In office 11 March 1983 – 25 March 1983

Secretary of the Department of Education
- In office 16 January 1973 – 11 March 1983

Personal details
- Born: 17 April 1924 Bundaberg, Queensland
- Died: 19 January 2022 (aged 97) Canberra, Australian Capital Territory
- Education: University of Queensland
- Occupation: Public servant

Kenneth Norman Jones AO CBE (17 April 1924 – 19 January 2022) was an Australian senior public servant.

== Early life ==
Kenneth Jones was born in Bundaberg, Queensland, on 17 April 1924. He attended the University of Queensland, graduating with a Bachelor of Commerce.

== Career ==
Jones began his Commonwealth Public Service career in 1941 when he joined the Official Receiver's Office in Queensland.

He was appointed to his first Secretary role in January 1973, at the Department of Education. He stayed head of that department for over ten years, and subsequently served as head of Department of Education and Youth Affairs (March 1983), Department of Administrative Services (March 1983 to December 1984) and the Department of Local Government and Administrative Services (December 1984 to July 1987). In total, he was a secretary in the Australian Government for over 13 years, retiring in 1986.

== Personal life and death ==
Jones died in Canberra on 19 January 2022, at the age of 97.

== Awards ==
In the New Year's Honours List for 1969 Jones was created a Commander of the Order of the British Empire. In June 1986 he was made an Officer of the Order of Australia, for public service, particularly in the fields of education and departmental administration.

== References and further reading ==
- Hyslop, Robert (1990), "Kenneth Norman Jones interviewed by Robert Hyslop", Conversations with Departmental Secretaries oral history project

Government offices
| Preceded by Himself as Secretary of the Department of Administrative Services | Secretary of the Department of Local Government and Administrative Services; 1984 – 1987 | Succeeded by Ron Brown as Secretary of the Department of Immigration, Local Government and Ethnic Affairs |
| Preceded by John Enfield as Secretary of the Department of Territories and Local Government | Secretary of the Department of Local Government and Administrative Services; 1984 – 1987 | Succeeded by Graham Glenn as Secretary of the Department of Administrative Services |
| Preceded by Peter Lawler | Secretary of the Department of Administrative Services; 1983 – 1984 | Succeeded by Himself as Secretary of the Department of Local Government and Administrative Services |
| Preceded by Himself as Secretary of the Department of Education | Secretary of the Department of Education and Youth Affairs; 1983 | Succeeded by Peter Wilenski |
| Preceded by Hugh Ennor (Acting) | Secretary of the Department of Education; 1973 – 1983 | Succeeded by Himself as Secretary of the Department of Education and Youth Affairs |
