= Fred Daly (politician) =

Australian politician

The Honourable Fred Daly AO
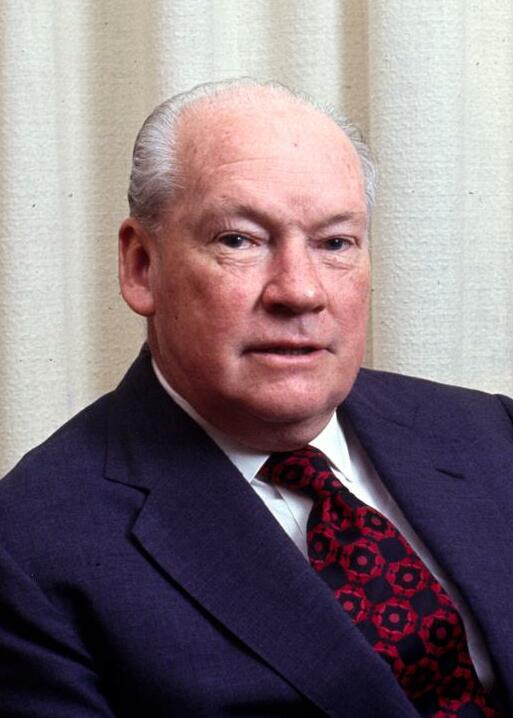
- Official portrait, 1973

Leader of the House
- In office 5 December 1972 – 11 November 1975
- Preceded by: Don Chipp
- Succeeded by: Ian Sinclair

Father of the House
- In office 2 November 1972 – 11 November 1975
- Preceded by: Arthur Calwell
- Succeeded by: Kim Beazley Sr.

Member of the Australian Parliament for Grayndler
- In office 10 December 1949 – 11 November 1975
- Preceded by: New seat
- Succeeded by: Tony Whitlam

Member of the Australian Parliament for Martin
- In office 21 August 1943 – 10 December 1949
- Preceded by: William McCall
- Succeeded by: William O'Connor

Personal details
- Born: 13 June 1912 Curabubulla, New South Wales
- Died: 2 August 1995 (aged 83)
- Party: Australian Labor Party (NSW Branch)
- Occupation: Clerk

Frederick Michael Daly AO (13 June 1912 – 2 August 1995) was an Australian politician who served as a member of the House of Representatives from 1943 to 1975, representing the Labor Party. In the Whitlam government he was Leader of the House, Minister for Services and Property, and Minister for Administrative Services.

== Early life ==
Daly was born on 13 June 1912 in Currabubula, New South Wales. He was the ninth of eleven children born to Margaret Jane (née Howard) and Michael Daly. His father, born in Ireland, was a farmer and grazier.

Daly grew up on his family's farming property of 8,000 acres (3,200 ha). After his father's death in 1923 the property was sold and the family moved to Sydney and settled in North Bondi. He attended Waverley College, where he "hated school and failed most of his examinations". He left school at the age of 13 and began working for Bennett & Wood, a bicycle manufacturing firm, as a messenger boy and clerk. During World War II Daly worked for the Department of Navy under the orders of the Manpower Directorate. He was an official in the New South Wales branch of the Federated Clerks' Union of Australia.

== Politics ==
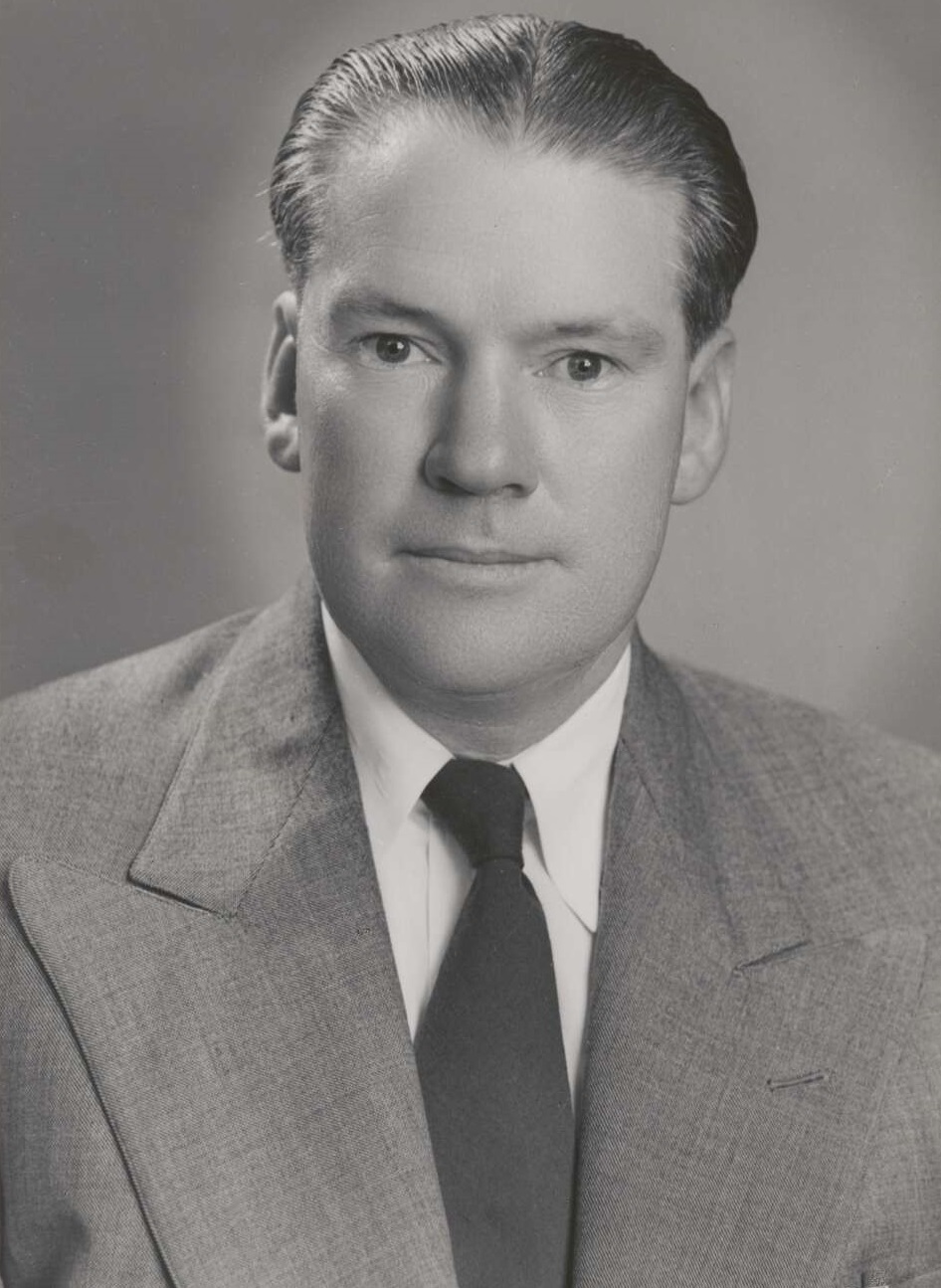
Fred Daly c. 1951

Daly joined the ALP's Waverley branch in the early 1930s. He was elected to the House of Representatives at the 1943 federal election, winning the seat of Martin from the incumbent United Australia Party MP Bill McCall as part of a lanslide Labor victory. He transferred to the new seat of Grayndler at the 1949 election.

Daly spent the next 23 years as an opposition frontbencher – one of a generation of Labor politicians whose career opportunities were greatly reduced by the splits and internal conflicts of the 1950s and 1960s. As a Catholic, and distraught with the Labor Leader, Evatt and his conduct at party caucus meetings, Daly had sympathies with the right-wing group which left the Labor Party in 1955 and later formed the Democratic Labor Party, but he remained loyal to the party and defeated several attempts by the left to challenge his party endorsement.

Daly became well known as one of the great humorists of the House. Among his well-known lines were: "The Country Party has two election policies – one for people and one for sheep", and "He (Billy Snedden) couldn't lead a flock of homing pigeons".

=== Whitlam Era ===
From 1967 onwards Daly was a strong supporter of Gough Whitlam in his battles with the left wing of the party, and in 1969 Whitlam made him Shadow Minister for Immigration. But his support for retaining some elements of the White Australia Policy in Labor's platform caused Whitlam to remove him from the portfolio. When Labor won the 1972 election – by which time Daly was the Father of the House – he became Minister for Services and Property (in 1974 renamed Administrative Services), responsible for the Department of Services and Property.

This put Daly in charge of, among other things, the Australian Electoral Commission, and he tried to pass legislation which would have abolished the malapportionment of electorates in favour of rural areas (see Australian electoral system), but his bills were defeated in the Senate. After the 1974 election he was able to get many of his reforms to the electoral system passed.

He was also Leader of the House throughout the Whitlam government.

After the Whitlam government was dismissed by the Governor-General, Sir John Kerr in November 1975, Daly announced he would retire from parliament and not contest the December election. He delayed his announcement until the last minute, to ensure that Whitlam's son Tony Whitlam was able to secure endorsement for Grayndler without opposition.

== Later life ==
Daly had acquired a dog which he named "Sir John" in reference to Kerr shortly before the sacking the Whitlam government (Daly later stated "I wouldn't name a dog after him [Kerr]"). Weighing 49 kilograms "Sir John" became known as Canberra's "dog about town" once opening a local library and kicked off a rugby league match once for the Canberra Raiders team. The dog appeared on several television ads and television episodes, including when Daly was featured on the This Is Your Life television programme. In 1986 "Sir John" died.

In retirement Daly published two volumes of humorous memoirs, From Curtin to Kerr and The Politician who Laughed. He remained active in the New South Wales Labor Party until his death in 1995. On 2 August 1995 Daly collapsed at about 9.50 am just after he had finished changing a light bulb in the kitchen of his daughter's home in Bondi Junction, his health having deteriorated noticeably over the preceding year. He was accorded a state funeral at St Brigid's Church, Marrickville, attended by a huge crowd of Labor loyalists. At the time of his death, he was the last surviving person to have served as a member of parliament during the Curtin and Forde governments and the surviving former MP with the earliest date of first election.

== See also ==
- List of longest-serving members of the Parliament of Australia

Parliament of Australia
Preceded by William McCall	Member for Martin; 1943–1949	Succeeded by William O'Connor
New division	Member for Grayndler; 1949–1975	Succeeded by Tony Whitlam
Political offices
Preceded by Don Chipp	Leader of the House; 1972–1975	Succeeded by Ian Sinclair
New title	Minister for Services and Property; 1972–1975	Succeeded by Himself as Minister for Administrative Services
New title	Minister for Administrative Services; 1975	Succeeded by Tom Drake-Brockman
Honorary titles
Preceded by Arthur Calwell	Father of the House of Representatives; 1972–1975	Succeeded by Kim Beazley Snr.
