= Mugga Lane Zoo =

- Interactive map of Mugga Lane Zoo
- 35.3514716°S 149.134962°E
- Date opened: 19 December 1979
- Date closed: 2002
- Location: Mugga Lane, Symonston
- Land area: 9 ha (22 acres)
- Owner: Terry Thomas (1979-1989); Doug Lloyd (1990-2002)

The Mugga Lane Zoo was a privately owned zoo located on Mugga Lane in the Australian capital city of Canberra. First opened in 1979 as the Canberra Wildlife Gardens, It was the first permanent zoo in the city, predating the National Zoo & Aquarium by over a decade. In 1981 the park was rebranded as the Mugga Lane Zoo, although the Canberra Wildlife Gardens name continued to be occasionally used until 1986. The zoo grounds was a 9 ha (0.035 mi^{2}) site. Today, the now abandoned site remains a well known location in Canberra due to its popularity with urban explorers, and as a likely source of the feral peacocks often seen around South Canberra. According to the founder, Terry Thomas, the zoo was never financially successful, in part due to difficulties experienced attaining animal permits from the Department of the Capital Territory.

== History ==
The Mugga Lane Zoo first began construction in 1979, following a three-year approval process by the Department of the Capital Territory that had first been sought in 1975 by the owner, Terry Thomas. However, despite receiving approval, the park was not yet licensed as a zoo and it consequently opened on 19 December 1979 as the Canberra Wildlife Gardens. It took a further three years for the park to be issued a licence, after which it rebranded to its final name. Although now a licensed zoo, the park continued to experience difficulty gaining animal permits.

In order to overcome severe water restrictions put in place as a result of the 1979–1983 Eastern Australian drought, a dam was constructed on the property. To date it is one of the few remaining landmarks of the zoo.

In 1989 Thomas sold the zoo to Doug Lloyd, a local secondhand bookstore owner. According to Thomas, this marked the start of the zoos decline. The zoo closed permanently around 2002, and, as of 2020, the area is classified as NUZ1 broadacre land, meaning it is designated as a buffer between neighbouring towns and is a future urban development zone.

== Animals ==
=== Mammals ===
- Red, Eastern grey, and Western grey kangaroos
- Wallaroos
- Swamp and Red-necked wallabies
- Red-necked pademelons
- Wombats
- Northern and Southern dingos
- Red foxes
- Fallow deer
- Blackbucks
- Thick-tailed galago
- Pardine genet
- Striped skunk
- Great red agoutis
- Bonnet and Crab-eating macaques
- Barbary sheep
- Servals
- Domestic mammals
