= Department of the Special Minister of State (1972–1975) =

Australian government department, 1972–1975

Department overview
- Formed: 19 December 1972
- Preceding Department: Department of the Environment, Aborigines and the Arts – for electoral activities, overseas visits, government gazette
- Dissolved: 22 December 1975
- Superseding Department: Department of Health (I) – for health services on Christmas and Cocos Islands Department of Business and Consumer Affairs – for industries assistance and prices justification Department of Administrative Services (II) Department of Education (I) – for education on Christmas and Cocos Islands
- Jurisdiction: Commonwealth of Australia
- Ministers responsible: Don Willesee, Minister (1972–1973); Lionel Bowen, Minister (1973–1975); Doug McClelland, Minister (1975); Reg Withers, Minister (1975)
- Department executives: John Bunting, Acting Secretary (1972–1973); Peter Lawler, Secretary (1973–1975)

The Department of the Special Minister of State was an Australian government department that existed between December 1972 and December 1975.

== History ==
The Department was one of several new Departments established by the Whitlam government, a wide restructuring that revealed some of the new government's program.

== Scope ==
Information about the department's functions and government funding allocation could be found in the Administrative Arrangements Orders, the annual Portfolio Budget Statements and in the Department's annual reports.

The functions of the Department at its creation were:

- National Archives
- National Library
- Royal Charters
- War Graves
- Grants to National organisations
- World Expositions
- Commonwealth Gazette and Commonwealth Directory

== Structure ==
The Department was a Commonwealth Public Service department, staffed by officials who were responsible to the Special Minister of State.
