= Maurice Timbs =

Australian public servant (1917–1994)

Maurice Timbs AO

Secretary of the Department of Services and Property
- In office 16 January 1973 – 7 October 1975

Secretary of the Department of Administrative Services (II)
- In office 7 October 1975 – 22 December 1975

Personal details
- Born: Maurice Carmel Timbs; 1917
- Died: 1994 (aged 76–77)
- Spouse: Heather Joan Woodhead
- Occupation: Public servant

Maurice Carmel Timbs AO (1917–1994) was a senior Australian public servant and administrator.

Born in 1917, Timbs was educated at the University of Sydney, where he was a rugby league footballer. He joined the Australian Public Service in 1936.

In 1943, during his war service with AIF artillery, he married Heather Joan Woodhead in the first service wedding in the Northern Territory.

After the war, he held a number of positions including Executive Commissioner of the Atomic Energy Commission in the early 1970s. He was promoted to his first Secretary position in January 1973, as head of the new Department of Services and Property.

Between 1976 and 1984, Timbs was a Christmas Island Phosphate Commissioner.

== Awards and honours ==
Timbs was made an Officer of the Order of Australia in June 1981.

Timbs Street in Casey, Australian Capital Territory is named for Maurice Timbs.

Government offices
Preceded by George Warwick Smith	Secretary of the Department of Services and Property; 1973 – 1975	Succeeded by Himself as Secretary of the Department of Administrative Services (II)
Preceded by Himself as Secretary of the Department of Services and Property	Secretary of the Department of Administrative Services (II); 1975	Succeeded by Peter Lawler as Secretary of the Department of Administrative Services (III)
