= Bruce McDonald =

Bruce McDonald may refer to:

- Bruce McDonald (Australian politician) (born 1935), New South Wales politician
- Bruce McDonald (director) (born 1959), Canadian film and TV director
- Bruce McDonald (judge) (died 2005), Canadian judge
- Bruce Alexander McDonald (1925–1993), officer in the Australian Army
- Bruce J. McDonald (Michigan politician) (1866–1923), Michigan politician
- Bruce McDonald (academic), American professor of public budgeting and finance

== See also ==
- Bruce MacDonald (disambiguation)
