= Pat Galvin (public servant) =

Australian public servant

Pat Galvin AM

Secretary of the Department of Home Affairs and Environment
- In office 1 February 1984 – 13 December 1984

Secretary of the Department of Arts, Heritage and Environment
- In office 13 December 1984 – 24 July 1987

Personal details
- Born: Patrick John Galvin; 17 March 1933 (age 93) Adelaide, South Australia
- Spouse: Lenore Manderson
- Children: Michael Galvin, Terence Galvin, Simon Gratton, Scott Galvin, Tobias Manderson-Galvin, Kerith Manderson-Galvin
- Parent: Pat Galvin
- Education: University of Adelaide
- Occupation: Public servant

Patrick John Galvin AM (born 17 March 1933) is an Australian retired senior public servant. He was Secretary of the Department of Arts, Heritage and Environment between 1984 and 1987.

== Life and career ==
Galvin was born in Adelaide, South Australia, on 17 March 1933. His father, also called Pat Galvin, was an Australian Labor Party member of the House of Representatives.

Galvin joined the Australian Public Service in 1950, with a personnel cadetship that enabled him to obtain an arts degree from the University of Adelaide.

Whilst working in the Department of External Territories, Galvin served in Papua New Guinea.

In 1982, Galvin was appointed as a Deputy Secretary in the Department of Home Affairs and Environment. He was appointed Secretary of the Department in July 1984, having acted in the role since February that year. A departmental reshuffle in December 1984 saw him transitioning to become Secretary of the Department of Arts, Heritage and Environment.

Galvin retired from the public service in 1988, and moved to Brisbane with his wife Dr Lenore Manderson who had been appointed to a position at the University of Queensland.

== Awards ==
In January 1991, Galvin was made a Member of the Order of Australia in recognition of his services to heritage, the arts and the Public Service.

Government offices
Preceded by Don McMichael	Secretary of the Department of Home Affairs and Environment; 1984	Succeeded by Himself as Secretary of the Department of Arts, Heritage and Environment
Preceded by Himself as Secretary of the Department of Home Affairs and Environment	Secretary of the Department of Arts, Heritage and Environment; 1984–1987	Succeeded by Tony Blunn as Secretary of the Department of the Arts, Sport, the Environment, Tourism and Territories
