= Noel Tanzer =

Australian public servant (1931–2025)

Noel Tanzer AC

Secretary of the Department of the Arts and Administrative Services
- In office 24 March 1993 – 19 December 1993

Secretary of the Department of Administrative Services
- In office 1 March 1989 – 24 March 1993

Secretary of the Department of Veterans' Affairs
- In office 18 December 1986 – 1 March 1989

Personal details
- Born: Noel John Tanzer; 16 November 1931 Cairns, Australia
- Died: 17 June 2025 (aged 93) Brisbane, Australia
- Occupation: Public servant

Noel John Tanzer, AC (16 November 1931 – 17 June 2025) was an Australian senior public servant and policymaker.

== Life and career ==
Noel John Tanzer was born on 16 November 1931.

Tanzer began his career in the Commonwealth Public Service in 1949, serving for 17 years in Brisbane.

In 1980 and 1981 he was serving as a senior assistant commissioner in the management systems and efficiency division of the Public Service Board.

He was appointed Secretary of the Department of Veterans' Affairs in 1986. Immediately prior to his Veterans' Affairs appointment, he had been a Deputy Secretary in the Department of Social Security.

Tanzer moved to the Department of Administrative Services in 1989. His task was to have the department operate in accordance with commercial principles. He also aimed to improve departmental services to customers. He restructured 17 separate departmental units into four programs, and offered redundancy packages to downsize the department, reducing staffing numbers by more than 1000. The new structure Tanzer established saw much of the department run on commercial lines and funded on a trust-account basis.

He retired from the public service in 1993, his final appointment was as Secretary of the Department of the Arts and Administrative Services. As head of the Department, he was responsible for handling more than $2 billion in revenue.

In 1994, Tanzer was appointed as a consultant to the law firm Mallesons Stephen Jaques.

Tanzer died in Brisbane on 17 June 2025, at the age of 93.

== Awards ==
Tanzer was made a Companion of the Order of Australia in 1994.

Government offices
Preceded by Himself as Secretary of the Department of Administrative Services	Secretary of the Department of the Arts and Administrative Services; 1993	Succeeded by Andrew Podger
Preceded by Tony Blunn as Secretary of the Department of the Arts, Sport, the Environment and Territories	Secretary of the Department of the Arts and Administrative Services; 1993	Succeeded by Andrew Podger
Preceded by Graham Glenn	Secretary of the Department of Administrative Services; 1989–1993	Succeeded by Himself as Secretary of the Department of the Arts and Administrative Services
Preceded by Derek Volker	Secretary of the Department of Veterans' Affairs; 1986–1989	Succeeded by Lionel Woodward
