= John Enfield =

John Enfield AO

Secretary of the Department of Territories and Local Government
- In office 24 May 1983 – 13 December 1984

=Secretary of the Department of Territories
- In office 13 December 1984 – 24 July 1987

Personal details
- Born: 1934 John David Enfield
- Died: 11 August 1992 (aged 57–58)
- Spouse: Margaret
- Children: Samantha, Matthew and Nicholas
- Education: University of Sydney
- Occupation: Public servant

John David Enfield, AO (1934 – 11 August 1992) was a senior Australian Public Service official and administrator.

== Life and career ==
John Enfield was born in 1934. He studied engineering at the University of Sydney.

Enfield joined the Department of Defence in 1962, working in the department's systems analysis branch on weapons effectiveness and acquisitions. He moved to the Department of the Treasury in 1972 to head the Transport and Communications Branch, including as part of the Second Sydney Airport Committee.

He later moved to the Department of the Prime Minister and Cabinet, into a role as a Deputy Secretary until 1983.

Whilst Secretary of the Department of Territories and Local Government, and later the Department of Territories, Enfield established the financial path for the Australian Capital Territory to self-government.

Enfield died of cancer on 11 August 1992, his funeral was held at Old Parliament House in Canberra.

== Awards and honours ==
Enfield was made an Officer of the Order of Australia in June 1991 in recognition of his services to public administration.

In 2009, a street in the Canberra suburb of Casey was named Enfield Street in John Enfield's honour.

Government offices
Preceded by Tony Blunn	Secretary of the Department of Territories and Local Government; 1983–1984	Succeeded by Himself as Secretary of the Department of Territories
Preceded by Tony Blunn	Secretary of the Department of Territories and Local Government; 1983–1984	Succeeded by Kenneth Norman Jones as Secretary of the Department of Local Government and Administrative Services
Preceded by Himself as Secretary of the Department of Territories and Local Government	Secretary of the Department of Territories; 1984–1987	Succeeded by Tony Blunn as Secretary of the Department of the Arts, Sport, the Environment, Tourism and Territories
Preceded by Peter Wilenski	Public Service Commissioner; 1987–1990	Succeeded by Dennis Ives
