= Australian Surveying and Land Information Group =

Australian government body, 1987–2001

Australian Surveying and Land Information Group (AUSLIG)
Agency overview
- Formed: 1987
- Preceding agencies: Australian Surveying Office; Division of National Mapping
- Dissolved: 2001
- Superseding agency: Geoscience Australia
- Jurisdiction: Australia

Australian Surveying and Land Information Group (AUSLIG) was an Australian organisation that merged in 2001 with the Australian Geological Survey Organisation to become Geoscience Australia.

Its headquarters were located in the Fernhill Technology Park in Canberra.

AUSLIG's main function was to provide national geographic information.

It produced maps and audiovisual products relative to many aspects of Australian geography from the technology available during its time of operation.

It was formed in 1987, when the Australian Survey Office joined with the Division of National Mapping. The Australian Survey Office had been established in 1910. The Division of National Mapping had been in operation since 1947, and had been publisher of the Atlas of Australian resources which had incorporated over 20 component booklets of standard information about Australian natural resources at the time of publication.

AUSLIG also provided satellite imagery to industry and government. AUSLIG incorporated the Australian Centre for Remote Sensing (ACRES), which had been established in 1979 as the Australian Landsat Station and had been renamed in 1986. The Australian Survey Office, under its own name, was working with remote sensing data in 1988.
