= Tony Blunn =

Australian public servant

Tony Blunn AO

Secretary of the Department of the Capital Territory
- In office 10 August 1981 – 11 March 1983

Secretary of the Department of Territories and Local Government
- In office 11 March 1983 – 3 May 1983

Secretary of the Department of Housing and Construction
- In office 2 May 1983 – 24 July 1987

Secretary of the Department of the Arts, Sport, the Environment, Tourism and Territories
- In office 24 July 1987 – 27 December 1991

Secretary of the Department of the Arts, Sport, the Environment and Territories
- In office 27 December 1991 – 24 March 1993

Secretary of the Department of Social Security
- In office 24 March 1993 – 5 February 1998

Secretary of the Attorney-General's Department
- In office 1998 – 17 December 1999

Personal details
- Born: Anthony Stuart Blunn; 1936 (age 89–90)
- Children: 3
- Occupation: Public servant

Anthony Stuart "Tony" Blunn AO (born 1936) is an Australian retired senior public servant.

== Life and career ==
Tony Blunn was born in 1936.

He joined the Australian Public Service at the age of 21, after four years with a firm of solicitors in Melbourne.

In 1979, Blunn took a position in the Department of Finance, in an area linked with works, mainland territories, defence and other areas. He moved to the Department of Business and Consumer Affairs in 1980, and was appointed to his first permanent secretary role in 1981 as head of the Department of the Capital Territory.

Blunn was appointed Secretary of the Attorney General's Department in 1998, replacing Stephen Skehill who resigned from the role.

Blunn was interviewed in 1995 by Annie Rushton about the Australian Antarctic Division. He was interviewed again in 2018. Both records can be found at the National Library of Australia.

Blunn retired from the public service in December 1999.

In 2000, Blunn was appointed chairman of the company in charge of managing Bruce Stadium.

== Awards and honours ==
In January 1989, Blunn was made an Officer of the Order of Australia in recognition of service to the public service.

Blunn Island, in Antarctica, is named after Blunn, who was responsible for Australia's Antarctic program between 1987 and 1993.

Government offices
Preceded by Laurie Daniels	Secretary of the Department of the Capital Territory; 1981–1983	Succeeded by Himself as Secretary of the Department of Territories and Local Government
New title Department established	Secretary of the Department of Territories and Local Government; 1983	Succeeded by John Enfield
Preceded by Rae Taylor (Acting)	Secretary of the Department of Housing and Construction; 1983–1987	Department abolished
Preceded by Bruce MacDonald as Secretary of the Department of Sport, Recreation and Tourism	Secretary of the Department of the Arts, Sport, the Environment, Tourism and Territories; 1987–1991	Succeeded by Himself as Secretary of the Department of the Arts, Sport, the Environment and Territories
Preceded by Pat Galvin as Secretary of the Department of Arts, Heritage and Environment	Secretary of the Department of the Arts, Sport, the Environment, Tourism and Territories; 1987–1991	Succeeded by Geoff Miller as Secretary of the Department of Tourism
Preceded by Himself as Secretary of the Department of the Arts, Sport, the Environment, Tourism and Territories	Secretary of the Department of the Arts, Sport, the Environment and Territories; 1991–1993	Succeeded by Noel Tanzer as Secretary of the Department of the Arts and Administrative Services
Preceded by Himself as Secretary of the Department of the Arts, Sport, the Environment, Tourism and Territories	Secretary of the Department of the Arts, Sport, the Environment and Territories; 1991–1993	Succeeded by Stuart Hamilton as Secretary of the Department of the Environment, Sport and Territories
Preceded by Derek Volker	Secretary of the Department of Social Security; 1993–1998	Succeeded by David Rosalky
Preceded by Stephen Skehill	Secretary of the Attorney-General's Department; 1998–1999	Succeeded by Robert Cornall
