= Tobias Manderson-Galvin =

Australian actor

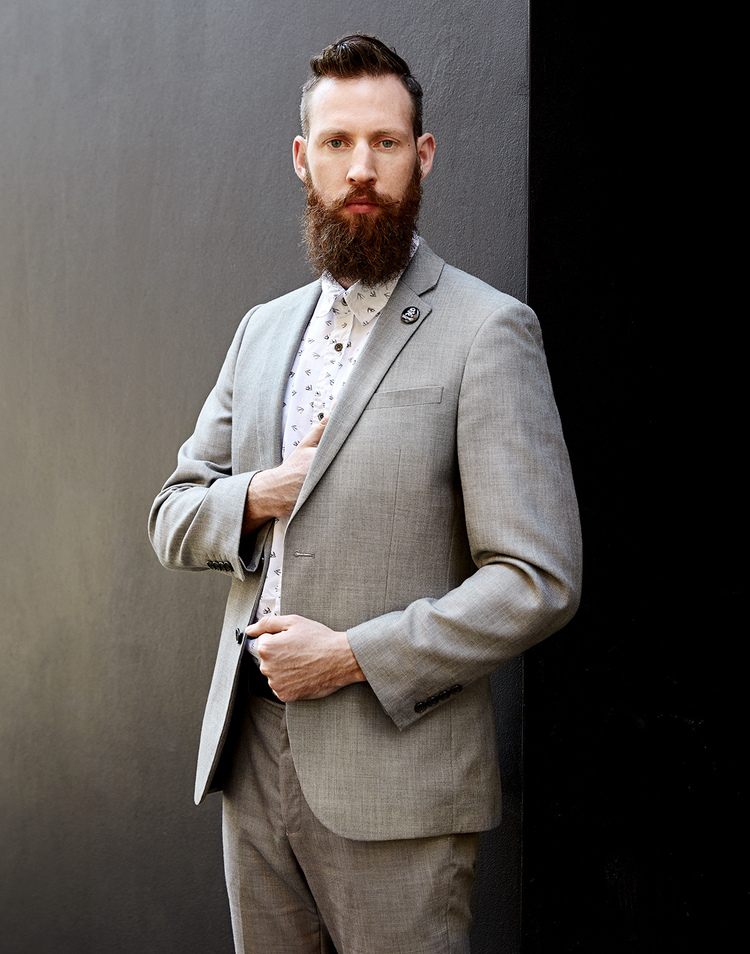
- Manderson-Galvin at a British Council promotion, 2014
- Born: 19 August 1984 (age 42); Canberra, ACT, Australia
- Education: University of Melbourne & Swinburne University
- Occupations: Performer, director, poet, satirist, playwright, dramaturg
- Parent(s): Lenore Manderson, Pat Galvin (public servant)
- Awards: St Martins National Playwriting Award 2009; Green Room Award For Contribution to Independent Theatre Melbourne (Co-Recipient)
- Website: www.mka.org.au www.doppelgangster.com

Tobias Alexander Edward Manderson-Galvin (born 19 August 1984) is an Australian actor, satirist, performance poet, and playwright. He is co founder and CEO/Artistic Director of Melbourne's new writing theatre: MKA: Theatre of New Writing. and UK/Aus company Doppelgangster.

== Summary ==
Manderson-Galvin's distinctive theatre runs the gamut from docu-drama to black comedy, vaudeville to hyper-realism making him a notable Australian theatre maker. He's also distinguished by his increasingly large body of work. Manderson-Galvin writes and appears in much of his theatre also directing the majority of it. For inspiration, Manderson-Galvin draws heavily on his training as a ballet dancer, philosophy, sociology, and his Jewish and Irish heritage. He's performed on stages diverse as the Melbourne Theatre Company, Kings Cross Theatre, a carpark, and an old tip.

His writing has appeared in academic publications, poetry anthologies, and briefly for Daily Review.

== Public controversies ==
On Melbourne Cup Day, 2023, when at a Coalition for the Protection of Racehorses 'Nup to the Cup' event Manderson-Galvin performed a poem that called for racegoers to be murdered. According to The Age this attracted a police investigation. Manderson-Galvin stated the poem was satirical and was disbelieving that any one could have thought otherwise.

In December 2011 Manderson-Galvin's stage-thriller 'The Economist' – a play responding to the 2011 Norway attacks – generated controversy in Australia when Manderson-Galvin repeated to media that the killer had cited former Australian Prime Minister John Howard and Treasurer Peter Costello in his manifesto. Writing for the Age critic John Bailey challenged the reactionary reporting noting that comments like sent shockwaves across the globe andcritics have savaged had been reported before the production had even opened.

== Selected stage works ==
- Everybody Loses(2017-19), Writer/Deviser, Doppelgangster, Aberystwyth Arts Centre (Wales), La Générale (Paris), Vault Festival (London), Performance Lab (Sheffield), Tom Thumb (Margate), Alcalá de Henares (Madrid), The Projector (Singapore), Backbone Arts (Brisbane), MKA Theatre (Melbourne), Kings Cross Theatre (Sydney), Apparat Athen (Athens)
- A Public Reading of an Unproduced Screenplay about the Death of Disney (2016), Director/Performer, MKA: Theatre of New Writing, Provocare Festival
- Doppelgangster's TITANIC (2015–16), co-writer + performer, Doppelgangster, (Cardiff, Experimentica; Paris, ArtCOP21; Aberystwyth, Site2Safle2 Festival; Melbourne, Hot!Hot!Hot! Festival)
- Lucky (2015), Playwright, MKA: Theatre of New Writing in association with Melbourne Theatre Company's NEON Festival
- Please Don't Talk About Me When Im Gone (2015), Playwright, MKA: Theatre of New Writing + Les Foules, VAULT Festival (Winner, Outstanding New Production, Vault Awards)
- Thank You, Thank You Love (2014), Playwright, Director, Performer, MKA: Theatre of New Writing + HYPRTXT Festival
- The Economist (2011), Playwright, MKA: Theatre of New Writing
- Dogmeat (2010)+(2014), Playwright + Performer, MKA: Theatre of New Writing
