= John Kachoyan =

Armenian-Australian stage director

- Born: Oatley, New South Wales
- Education: Newington College; University of Sydney; National Institute of Dramatic Art; Central School of Speech and Drama; Australian Film Television and Radio School
- Occupations: Theatre director, writer, producer, dramaturge

John Kachoyan is an Armenian-Australian director, writer, and dramaturg. He is a co-founder of Iron Bark, a theatre company in London, specialising in new Australian plays, and the former Creative Director of MKA: Theatre of New Writing, in Melbourne. Kachoyan has been a Director In Residence at Bell Shakespeare.

== Education ==
Kachoyan was born and raised in Oatley, New South Wales. He attended Newington College (1995–2000) and graduated with BA (Media & Communications) from the University of Sydney, including a year studying at the University of Toronto. In 2004 he completed the National Institute of Dramatic Art Playwright's Studio and holds a Master of Arts (Advanced Theatre Practice) from the Royal Central School of Speech and Drama (RCSSD).

== Career ==
Kachoyan spent 2007 to 2011 in London on a grant from the Australia Cultural Fund, where he co-founded IronBark – his work at IronBark involved productions and developments with leading Australian playwrights including Ben Ellis, Tom Holloway, Jack Hibberd, Vivienne Walshe and Melissa Bubnic and was Resident Assistant Director at the Finborough Theatre.

Returning to Australia he was appointed the 2012 Director in Residence for Bell Shakespeare – working extensively with the company's development arm Mind's Eye; including his adaptation of The Winter's Tale directed by John Bell in 2014 at the Sydney Opera House.

In 2013, Kachoyan was a Critical Stages Resident at the Seymour Centre, and was recently assistant director for Simon Phillips on Joanna Murray-Smith's new play Pennsylvania Avenue for Melbourne Theatre Company (2014)

== Recent works ==
- "Play For Australia" (2016/17), Director, Vessel Theatre
- "The River" by Jez Butterworth (2016), Director, Red Stitch Actors Theatre
- "Elegy" (2016), Director, Lab Kelpie
- "Lucky" (2015), Director & Dramaturgy, MKA: Theatre of New Writing
- HYPRTXT Festival (2014), Festival Co-director, MKA: Theatre of New Writing
- Tender Lands (2014), Director, Lyric Opera of Melbourne
- Dogmeat (2014), director, MKA: Theatre of New Writing
- The Winters Tale (2014) Dramaturg, Bell Shakespeare
- Sweet Nothings (2013), Director, Australian Theatre for Young People + PantsGuys
- Midsummer (2012), director, Red Stitch Actors Theatre
