= Department of Home Affairs and Environment =

Australian government department, 1980–1984

Department overview
- Formed: 3 November 1980
- Preceding Department: Department of Administrative Services (II) – for exhibitions and special events function Department of Science and the Environment – for environment and conservation Department of Home Affairs (III)
- Dissolved: 13 December 1984
- Superseding Department: Department of Veterans' Affairs – for Australian War Memorial Department of Sport, Recreation and Tourism – for international expositions Department of Arts, Heritage and Environment – for environment and conservation, cultural affairs including support for the arts, national collections, protection of the national heritage and national archives
- Jurisdiction: Commonwealth of Australia
- Headquarters: Canberra
- Ministers responsible: Bob Ellicott, Minister (1980–1981); Michael MacKellar, Minister (1981); Ian Wilson, Minister (1981–1982); Tom McVeigh, Minister (1982–1983); Barry Cohen, Minister (1983–1984)
- Department executives: Don McMichael, Secretary (1980–1984); Pat Galvin, Secretary (1984)

The Department of Home Affairs and Environment was an Australian government department that existed between November 1980 and December 1984.

== Scope ==
Information about the department's functions and government funding allocation could be found in the Administrative Arrangements Orders, the annual Portfolio Budget Statements and in the Department's annual reports.

According to the National Archives of Australia, at its creation, the Department was responsible for:

- Constitutional development of the Northern Territory of Australia
- Administration of Norfolk Island, the Territory of Cocos (Keeling) Islands, the Territory of Christmas Island, the Coral Sea Islands Territory and the Territory of Ashmore and Cartier Islands
- Women's affairs
- Support of the arts and letters
- National archives
- National museums
- World expositions
- Leisure, including sport, physical fitness and community recreation
- Environment and conservation.

== Structure ==
The Department was an Australian Public Service department, staffed by officials who were responsible to the Minister for Home Affairs and Environment.

The Department was headed by a Secretary, initially D.F. McMichael (until 1 February 1984) and then P. Galvin (acting in the role from 1 February 1984, then permanent from 27 July 1984).
