= Glyn Roberts =

Australian playwright, producer, and educator

- Born: November 17, 1982 (age 44); Melbourne, VIC, Australia
- Education: Victorian College of the Arts at University of Melbourne & Monash University
- Occupations: Playwright, producer, dramaturg, educator, and mystic
- Relatives: Claire Roberts (poet)
- Awards: Green Room Award For Contribution to Independent Theatre Melbourne (Co-Recipient); Short Listed Patrick White Award 2012; Long Listed Griffin Award 2012

Glyn Roberts (born 17 November 1982) is an Australian Arts Administrator and playwright.

== Career ==
Roberts has a Masters in Writing for Performance from Victorian College of the Arts.

He is the co-founder and former Creative Director of Melbourne's new writing theatre: MKA: Theatre of New Writing until September 2013. He is currently Program Manager at Brisbane's premiere contemporary theatre company, La Boite Theatre Company. The MKA: Theatre of New Writing was the 2012 recipient of the Green Room Special Award for Contribution to Independent Theatre in Melbourne.

Roberts' play Triangle was short-listed for the 2011 Patrick White Playwrights' Award and received two nominations for the 2012 Green Room Award (Theatre-Independent) for Tania Dickson (Direction) and Production. His play She Dances Like a Bomb was placed on the highly commended list for the 2013 Griffin Award.

== Works ==
- The Flock and the Nest, directed by Gary Abrahams, St Michael's Drama Studio and Red Stitch Writers, 2014
- She Dances Like a Bomb, Master of Writing for Performance Public Reading Program, 2012
- Triangle directed by Tanya Dickson, MKA: Theatre of New Writing, 2012
- The Horror Face directed by Felix Ching Ching Ho, MKA: Theatre of New Writing, 2011
