= Department of Territories (1984–1987) =

Australian government department, 1984–1987

Department overview
- Formed: 13 December 1984
- Preceding Department: Department of Territories and Local Government
- Dissolved: 24 July 1987
- Superseding Department: Department of Administrative Services (III) – for the Parliament House Construction Authority Department of the Arts, Sport, the Environment, Tourism and Territories – for all other functions
- Jurisdiction: Commonwealth of Australia
- Headquarters: Electricity House, City, Canberra
- Minister responsible: Gordon Scholes, Minister
- Department executive: John Enfield, Secretary

The Department of Territories was an Australian government department that existed between December 1984 and July 1987. It was the second Australian government department bearing this name.

== History ==
The department was abolished as part of the massive restructuring of the Public Service announced by Prime Minister Bob Hawke in July 1987.

== Scope ==
Information about the department's functions and government funding allocation could be found in the Administrative Arrangements Orders, the annual Portfolio Budget Statements and in the department's annual reports.

At its creation, the department dealt with:

- Administration of the Australian Capital Territory, the Jervis Bay Territory, the Territory of Cocos (Keeling) Islands, the Territory of Christmas Island, the Coral Sea Islands Territory and the Territory of Ashmore and Cartier Islands, as well as Commonwealth responsibilities on Norfolk Island.
- Constitutional development of the Northern Territory of Australia.

== Structure ==
The department was a Commonwealth Public Service department, staffed by officials who were responsible to the Minister for Territories.
