= Lenore Manderson =

Australian medical anthropologist (born 1951)

Lenore Manderson AM
- Born: 21 June 1951 (age 74); Melbourne, Australia
- Education: B.A.Asian Studies (Hons 1) (1973); Ph.D. (1978)
- Alma mater: Australian National University
- Spouse: Pat Galvin
- Children: 2, including Tobias Manderson-Galvin
- Awards: Fellow (ASSA) (1995); Federation Fellowship, ARC (2002); Rockefeller Bellagio Resident (2003); Research resident, NLM, NIH (2003); Fellow (SFAA, USA) (2002); Fellow (WAAS) (2004); MASA Mentor Award, (AAA), (SMA) (2007); Hillel Friedland Senior Fellow, Wits Uni (2008); Member of the Order of Australia (2020); Bronislaw Malinowski Award (2022)
- Scientific career
- Fields: Medical anthropology
- Institutions: Brown University; University of the Witwatersrand
- Website: www.lenoremanderson.com

Lenore Hilda Manderson AM (born 21 June 1951) is an Australian medical anthropologist. She is professor of medical anthropology in the Faculty of Medicine, Nursing and Health Sciences, and the School of Political and Social Inquiry, Faculty of Arts, at Monash University, Australia.

== Early life ==
Manderson was born in Melbourne, Victoria. She graduated from the Australian National University with a BA in Asian studies (Hons) and then a PhD.

== Career ==
Manderson was professor of tropical health (University of Queensland, 1988–1998). In recognition of her research, she was made a Fellow of the Australian Academy of Social Sciences in 1995. In 1999 she became professor of women's health (University of Melbourne) and remained in this position until 2005. She was president of the International Association for the Study of Sexuality, Culture and Society 2001–2003.

She was awarded an inaugural Australian Research Council Federation Fellowship in 2001, and took this up at Melbourne and continued with this work at Monash University when she moved there in 2005.

Manderson supervised to completion about 110 graduate students and mentored other trainees, research interns and colleagues in Australia and overseas; in recognition of this she was awarded the American Anthropological Association, Medical Anthropology Students’ Association Mentor Award in 2007.

Manderson's research concerns anthropology, social history and public health. She is a specialist in inequality, social exclusion and marginality, the social determinants of infectious and chronic disease, gender and sexuality, immigration, ethnicity and inequality, in Australia, Southeast and East Asia (including Malaysia, China, Thailand, the Philippines and Japan), South Africa and Ghana, and most recently in the Solomon Islands.

In 2010 Manderson and fellow researcher Carolyn Smith-Morris edited the book Chronic Conditions, Fluid States: Chronicity and the Anthropology of Illness She was the editor of the 2011 book Surface Tensions: Surgery, Bodily Boundaries and the Social Self, as well as Technologies of Sexuality, Identity and Sexual Health in the same year.

Manderson was chairperson of the program committee and a member of the board of trustees of the World Academy of Art and Science 2010–2011,

In 2012 she co-edited the book Flows of Faith: Religious Reach and Community in Asia and the Pacific with Wendy Smith and Matt Tomlinson, and Reframing Disability and Quality of Life: A Global Perspective with Narelle Warren.

== Honours ==
She was made a Fellow of the Academy of Social Sciences of Australia in 1995 and the World Academy of Art and Science in 2004. She is an honorary professor at University of the Witwatersrand, South Africa, and Khon Kaen University, Thailand.

In 2014 she is a member of the steering committee for a project of the Academy of Science of Australia on population, equity, climate change and sustainability. She was a member of the Scientific Advisory Committee for Stewardship on Research on Infectious Disease of Poverty (SAC-STE), WHO/TDR (Special Programme for Research and Training in Tropical Diseases) (2008-2011), and is a member of the TDR scientific and technical advisory committee from January 2012. She is editor of the international journal Medical Anthropology (2010–present).

In the 2020 Australia Day Honours, Manderson was appointed a Member of the Order of Australia.
