= George Warwick Smith =

Australian public servant

George Warwick Smith CBE
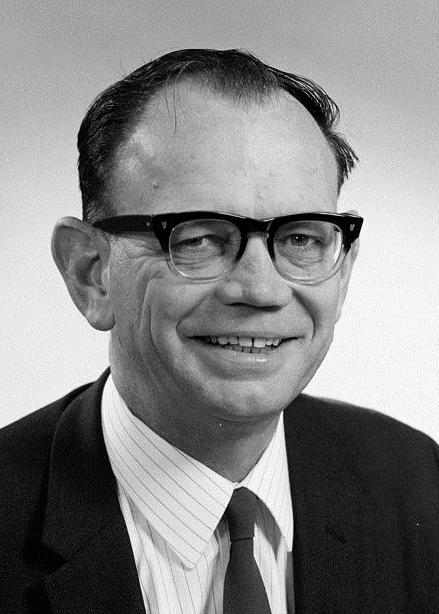

Secretary of the Department of Housing and Construction
- In office 5 December 1978 – 5 August 1980

Secretary of the Department of Construction
- In office 20 April 1976 – 5 December 1978

Secretary of the Department of the Northern Territory
- In office 19 December 1972 – 9 January 1973

Acting Secretary of the Department of Services and Property
- In office 19 December 1972 – 16 January 1973

Secretary of the Department of the Interior
- In office 23 July 1970 – 19 December 1972

Secretary of the Department of External Territories
- In office 28 February 1968 – 22 July 1970

Secretary of the Department of Territories
- In office 16 May 1964 – 27 February 1968

Secretary of the Department of the Capital Territory
- In office 20 December 1972 – 9 January 1973

Personal details
- Born: George Henry Warwick Smith; 3 October 1916 Charters Towers, Queensland
- Died: 27 December 1999 (aged 83) Sydney, New South Wales
- Spouse: Joan
- Children: 2 daughters and 1 son
- Occupation: Public servant

George Henry Warwick Smith CBE (3 October 1916 – 27 December 1999) was a senior Australian public servant.

== Early life ==
Warwick Smith was born in Charters Towers, Queensland on 3 November 1916. He attended high school at Brisbane Grammar School, but left early at the age of 15. He went on to matriculate and graduate with a Bachelor of Arts from the University of Queensland.

== Career ==
Warwick Smith moved from a job at the Queensland Education Department to the Commonwealth Public Service in the Department of Commerce. He soon left the public service to join the Army, serving during the Second World War between 1941 and 1945.

After the war, Warwick Smith returned to his public service career in the Department of Commerce. He was appointed personal assistant to the Department's Secretary, J.F. Murphy, with whom he gained a lot of trade conference experience.

Warwick Smith's first Secretary role was in the Department of Territories (later External Territories), he moved to the Department in 1964, a time when Australia was coming under increasing United Nations pressure to hasten Papua New Guinea's progress towards self-government. Warwick Smith established an unusual departmental structure with no deputy secretaries, which was unlike most Australian Government departments at the time.

He also served as Secretary in the Department of the Interior and the Secretary of the Department of Construction (later Housing and Construction).

Warwick Smith formally retired from the public service on 5 August 1980, his last position being as Secretary of the Department of Housing and Construction.

== Retirement ==
On retirement from the public service, Warwick Smith moved away from Canberra, first to Sydney and later to Bowral, working as a consultant in economic and public affairs. In his later years, Warwick Smith suffered from emphysema, which led to his death on 27 December 1999 in a nursing home in Sydney.

== References and further reading ==
- Denoon, Donald (2005), A trial separation: Australia and the decolonisation of Papua New Guinea, Australian National University
- Farquharson, John (1999), Warwick Smith, George Henry (1916–1999), Australian National University, archived from the original on 13 January 2014

Government offices
Preceded by Cyril Lambert	Secretary of the Department of Territories; 1964 – 1968	Succeeded by Himself as Secretary of the Department of External Territories
Preceded by Himself as Secretary of the Department of Territories	Secretary of the Department of External Territories; 1968 – 1970	Succeeded by David Hay
Preceded by Richard Kingsland	Secretary of the Department of the Interior; 1970 – 1972	Department abolished
Preceded by Himself as Secretary of the Department of the Interior	Secretary of the Department of the Northern Territory; 1972 – 1973	Succeeded by Allan O'Brien
Preceded by Himself as Secretary of the Department of the Interior	Secretary of the Department of the Capital Territory; 1972 – 1973	Succeeded by Lou Engledow
Preceded by Himself as Secretary of the Department of the Interior	Secretary of the Department of Services and Property (Acting); 1972 – 1973	Succeeded by Maurice Timbs
Preceded by Alan Reiher	Secretary of the Department of Construction; 1976 – 1978	Succeeded by Himself as Secretary of the Department of Housing and Construction
Preceded by Himself as Secretary of the Department of Construction	Secretary of the Department of Housing and Construction; 1978 – 1980	Succeeded by Collin Freeland
