= MKA: Theatre of New Writing =

Australian theatre company

- MK-Alpha, MKA, MKA Richmond
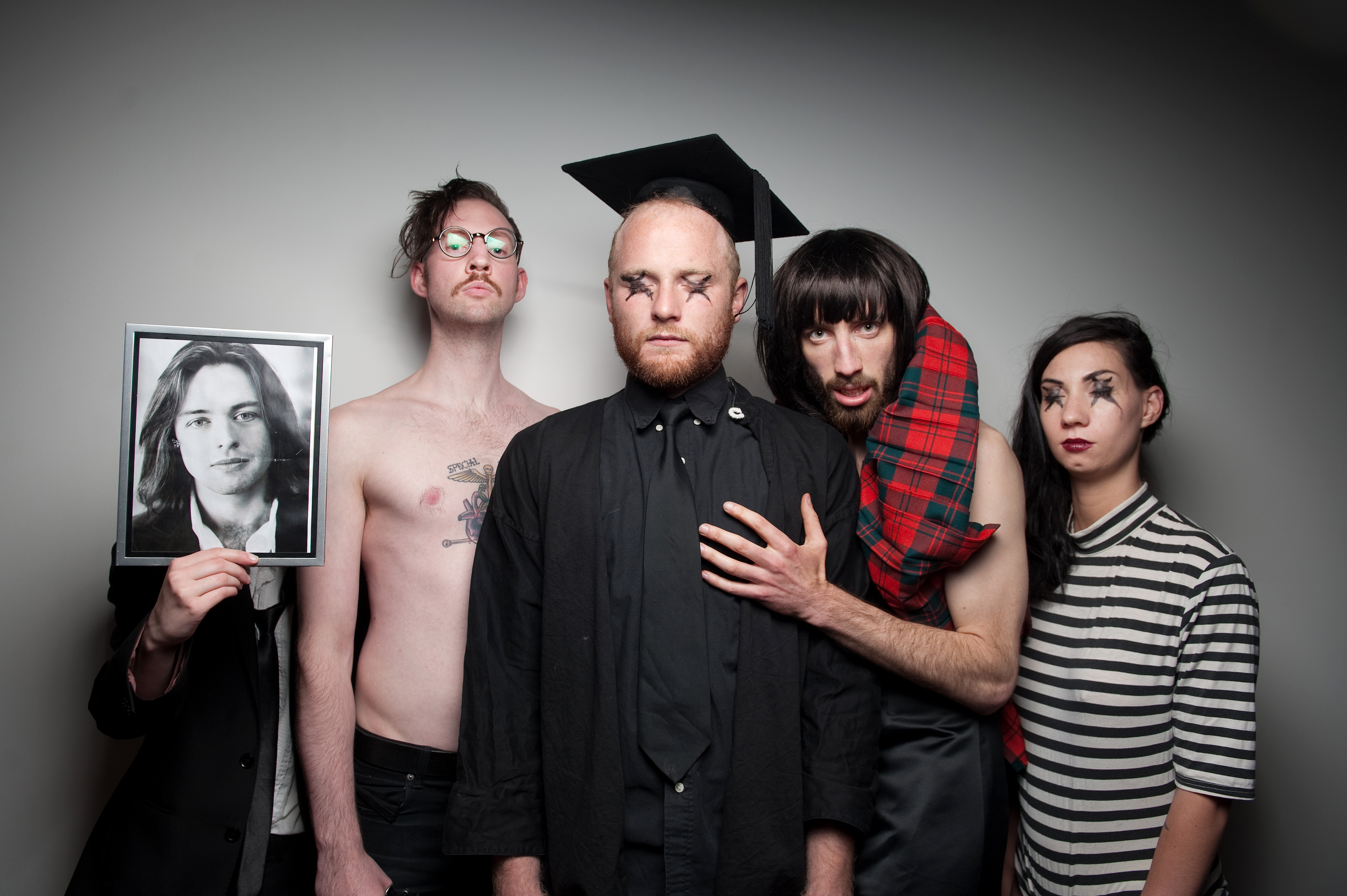
- Performers & writers for MKA 2013 pop-pp Adelaide season Adelaide Fringe
- Address: 2/24 Tanner Street; Yarra, Richmond, Victoria; Australia
- Type: New Writing Theatre
- Production: Seasons of commissioned and acquired productions

Construction
- Opened: March 2010

Website
- www.mka.org.au

MKA: Theatre of New Writing (often shortened to 'MK-Alpha' or 'MKA') is based in Richmond, in the Melbourne City of Yarra. It was established in March, 2010 as 'MKA Richmond', swiftly outgrowing the name to become one of the most celebrated contemporary theatre companies in Australia. A champion for new performance writers (e.g. playwrights, poets, choreographers), an increasing number of which, in the company's short history, have become established names in the industry. Productions such as The Economist, sex.violence.blood.gore a recurring season of new plays Open Season - and in 2014 the HYPRTXT Festival - and relationships with larger organisations such as Playwriting Australia have confirmed the company's position within the industry. The company's mission includes a focus on international, though in particular Australian and Asian works. From 2014-2016 the company was supported by Creative Victoria through the triennial funding, operational investment scheme.

== Venue ==
The company originally built a boutique 44-seat theatre at a site in Richmond, in the old Australian Knitting Mills, but due to a controversial situation in which the theatre was shut down by the Yarra Council, MKA ceased to operate the venue as anything other than an office and have since built and run nine pop-up theatres in spaces ranging from a shopping centre in the Melbourne CBD, the Prahran Mission in Prahran, an old Catholic School hall in Abbotsford, a series of spaces in a knitting mill in North Melbourne, amongst others, and have toured and transferred work nationally and abroad. The company at present does not have a permanent venue.

== Name ==
Various theories about the name of the company have surfaced over the years. The company website offers little in the way of assistance. That the building that the initial theatre was created in is the AKM building is one possibility of the origin of the name. Another leading theory is that the name is a reference to the Project MKUltra and MKAlpha mind control trials conducted by the USA's CIA from the 1950s, allegedly to present day. Another theory posed by Co-founder Tobias Manderson-Galvin is that the name stands for Ministry of Knowledge and Art, a playful reference to George Orwell's 1984. Co-founder Glyn Roberts has stated that MKA stands for Freedom and Duty Free Scotch.

== Controversy ==
The MKA: Theatre of New Writing has been the subject of a number of controversies, the first being the shutting down of the initial venue by local government and the second major controversy being in relation to then Artistic Director Tobias Manderson-Galvin's play 'The Economist'. Both attracted media and industry attention and debate, and garnered further support for the company from its existing niche audience base.

== Leadership ==
March 2010

MKA was founded by playwrights Glyn Roberts and Tobias Manderson-Galvin

2010 Founding
Artistic Director Tobias Manderson-Galvin
General Manager Glyn Roberts
Communications + Marketing Manager Georgia Fox

2010-2011
Artistic Director Tobias Manderson-Galvin
General Manager & Head of Programming Glyn Roberts
Literary Manager Carolyn Butler
Resident Designer David Samuel

2012
Artistic Director Tobias Manderson-Galvin
Executive Producer Glyn Roberts
Literary Manager Jana Perkovic
Resident Director Tanya Dickson
Resident Designer – Stage Eugyeene Teh
Resident Designer – Costume Chloe Greaves

2013
Creative Directors Tobias Manderson-Galvin & Glyn Roberts
Literary Manager Jana Perkovic
Casting Director Peter Paltos

2013-14
Creative Directors Tobias Manderson-Galvin & John Kachoyan
Literary Manager Jana Perkovic
Resident Director Kat Henry
Resident Dramaturg Mark Wilson
Creative Associate (Int) David Finnigan
Creative Associate (Melb) Eric Gardiner
Financial Consultant Corey 'the Cougar' Reynolds
Resident Photographer Sarah Walker

2014-15
Creative Directors Tobias Manderson-Galvin & John Kachoyan
Literary Associate Jana Perkovic
Resident Writer Morgan Rose
Business Manager Corey 'the Cougar' Reynolds

2015-16
Artistic Director / CEO Tobias Manderson-Galvin
Literary Associate Jana Perkovic
Resident Writer David Unwin
Financial Consultant Corey 'the Cougar' Reynolds

2016-17
Artistic Director / CEO Tobias Manderson-Galvin
Chair Dr. Tom Payne

Resident Writers Lizzie Brennan and James O'Donoghue

== Past Productions ==
Past productions include:

2016
- Doppelgangster's TITANIC by Doppelgangster
- 186,000 by Kerith Manderson-Galvin
- Hot!Hot!Hot! Climate Arts Festival
- Work Bitch by Luke Devine
- Baby by Tobias Manderson-Galvin & Dr Tom Payne

2015

- Bounty by Eric Gardiner
- SUBTXT Inaugural Developmental Festival
- Lord Willing and the Creek Don't Rise by Morgan Rose
- Lucky by Tobias Manderson-Galvin
- Please Don't Talk About Me When I'm Gone by Tobias Manderson-Galvin
- Being Dead (Don Quixote) by Kerith Manderson-Galvin

2014

- The Trouble with Harry by Lachlan Philpot; Melbourne Festival
- Richard II by Mark Wilson and Olivia Monticciolo
- HYPRTXT Inaugural Festival of New Writing & Performance
- On the Grace of Officials by Emilia Pöyhönen
- Sugar Sugar by Yve Blake
- Thank You, Thank You Love by Tobias Manderson-Galvin
- The Defence by Chris Dunstan
- Like a Fishbone by Anthony Weigh
- Dogmeat (Re-Boot) by Tobias Manderson-Galvin, (Perth Season)
- Party Time Giftset by WMG4000, Whil McBride & Kat Henry, (Perth Season)
- Unsex Me by Mark Wilson, (Perth Season)

2013

- Kids Killing Kids by Prosser, Burns-Warr, McAuley & Finnigan; Melbourne Fringe; Crack Theatre Festival; Q Theatre Penrith
- Unsex Me by Mark Wilson; Melbourne Fringe
- Side Effect by Max Mellor, Dan Evans, Eloise Maree & Daniel Maloney; Concept by Eloise Maree; Melbourne Fringe
- The Unspoken Word is 'Joe by Zoey Dawson; Brisbane Festival
- SOMA by Tobias Manderson-Galvin
- 22 Short Plays [Re-Dux] by David Finnigan
- Unsex Me by Mark Wilson
- Group Show by Max Mellor, Bridget Mackey, Nakkiah Lui, Chloe Martin and Leila Rodgers
- The Economist by Tobias Manderson-Galvin; Presented by Brisbane Powerhouse at World Theatre Festival

2012

- The Unspoken Word is 'Joe by Zoey Dawson
- sex.violence.blood.gore by Alfian bin Sa'at Sydney Season – Co-Presented by Tamarama Rock Surfers
- The Economist by Tobias Manderson-Galvin; Edinburgh Season – Presented at Edinburgh Festival Fringe
- Triangle by Glyn Roberts
- sex.violence.blood.gore by Alfian bin Sa'at
- Tuesday. by Louris van de Geer
- Tinkertown by Nathaniel Moncrieff
- Hose by Bridget Mackey

2011

- The Economist by Tobias Manderson-Galvin
- She's A Little Finch by Elise Hearst
- Open Season 2011 Reading series by 15 Australian Writers
- 22 Short Plays by David Finnigan; Canberra Season – Presented with Street Theatre
- J.A.T.O. by Vedrana Klepica (Croatia)
- The Horror Face by Glyn Roberts
- 22 Short Plays by David Finnigan
- Sleepyhead by Nathaniel Moncrieff

2010

- 25x1 Short Play Series by 25 Australian Writers
- Open Season 2010 Reading series by 25 Australian Writers
- dogmeat by Tobias Manderson-Galvin; Co-Produced with La Mama Theatre
