= Department of Arts, Heritage and Environment =

Australian government department, 1984–1987

Department overview
- Formed: 13 December 1984
- Preceding Department: Department of Home Affairs and Environment
- Dissolved: 24 July 1987
- Superseding Department: Department of Administrative Services (III); Department of the Arts, Sport, the Environment, Tourism and Territories
- Jurisdiction: Commonwealth of Australia
- Headquarters: City, Canberra
- Minister responsible: Barry Cohen, Minister
- Department executive: Pat Galvin, Secretary

The Department of Arts, Heritage and Environment was an Australian government department that existed between December 1984 and July 1987.

== Scope ==
Information about the department's functions and government funding allocation could be found in the Administrative Arrangements Orders, the annual Portfolio Budget Statements and in the Department's annual reports.

At the department's creation it was responsible for:

- Environment and conservation
- Cultural affairs, including support for the arts
- National collections
- National heritage.

== Structure ==
The Department was a Commonwealth Public Service department, staffed by officials who were responsible to the Minister for Arts, Heritage and the Environment.
