= Department of the Arts, Sport, the Environment and Territories =

Australian government department, 1991–1993

Department overview
- Formed: 27 December 1991
- Preceding Department: Department of the Arts, Sport, the Environment, Tourism and Territories
- Dissolved: 24 March 1993
- Superseding Department: Department of the Arts and Administrative Services – for the arts and information coordination services Department of the Environment, Sport and Territories – for environment, sport and territories functions
- Jurisdiction: Commonwealth of Australia
- Headquarters: Canberra
- Minister responsible: Ros Kelly, Minister
- Department executive: Tony Blunn, Secretary

The Department of the Arts, Sport, the Environment and Territories was an Australian government department that existed between December 1991 and March 1993.

== History ==
The department was created on 27 December 1991, a departmental name change by the Keating government.

== Scope ==
Information about the department's functions and government funding allocation could be found in the Administrative Arrangements Orders, the annual Portfolio Budget Statements and in the Department's annual reports.

At its creation, the Department dealt with:

- Cultural affairs, including support for the arts
- National collections
- National heritage
- Sport and recreation
- Environment and conservation
- Meteorology
- Information co-ordination and services within Australia, including advertising
- Administration of the Australian Capital Territory
- Administration of the Jervis Bay Territory, the Territory of Cocos (Keeling) Islands, the Territory of Christmas Island, the Coral Sea Islands Territory, the Territory of Ashmore and Cartier Islands, the Australian Antarctic Territory, and the Territory of Heard Island and the McDonald Islands, and of Commonwealth responsibilities on Norfolk Island
- Constitutional development of the Northern Territory of Australia.

== Structure ==
The Department was an Australian Public Service department, staffed by officials responsible to the Minister for the Arts, Sport, the Environment and Territories, Ros Kelly.
