= Department of the Capital Territory =

Australian government department, 1972–1983

Department overview
- Formed: 19 December 1972
- Preceding Department: Department of External Territories (II) – for Norfolk Island and Coral Sea Islands Territory Department of the Interior (II) – for ACT, Jervis Bay
- Dissolved: 11 March 1983
- Superseding Department: Department of Territories and Local Government
- Jurisdiction: Commonwealth of Australia
- Headquarters: Canberra
- Ministers responsible: Kep Enderby, Minister (1972–1973); Gordon Bryant, Minister (1973–1975); Eric Robinson, Minister (1975–1976); Tony Staley, Minister (1976–1977); Bob Ellicott, Minister (1977–1980); Michael Hodgman, Minister (1980–1983)
- Department executives: George Warwick Smith, Secretary (1972–1973); Lou Engledow, Secretary (1973–1977); Laurie Daniels, Secretary (1977–1981); Tony Blunn, Secretary (1981–1983)

The Department of the Capital Territory was an Australian government department that existed between December 1972 and March 1983.

== Scope ==
Information about the department's functions and government funding allocation could be found in the Administrative Arrangements Orders, the annual Portfolio Budget Statements and in the Department's annual reports.

According to the Administrative Arrangements Order made on 20 December 1972, the Department dealt with:

- Administration of the Australian Capital Territory, the Jervis Bay Territory, Norfolk Island and the Coral Sea Islands Territory.

== Structure ==
The Department was an Australian Public Service department, staffed by officials who were responsible to the Minister for the Capital Territory.

== List of ministers ==
#	Name	Party	Start	End	Prime Minister
1	Kep Enderby	Labor	19 December 1972	9 October 1973	Gough Whitlam
2	Gordon Bryant	Labor	9 October 1973	11 November 1975	Gough Whitlam
3	Reg Withers	Liberal	11 November 1975	22 December 1975	Malcolm Fraser
4	Eric Robinson	Liberal	22 December 1975	16 February 1976	Malcolm Fraser
5	Tony Staley	Liberal	16 February 1976	20 December 1977	Malcolm Fraser
6	Bob Ellicott	Liberal	20 December 1977	3 November 1980	Malcolm Fraser
7	Michael Hodgman	Liberal	3 November 1980	11 March 1983	Malcolm Fraser
