= Department of Administrative Services (1975) =

Australian government department, 1975–1975

Department overview
- Formed: 7 October 1975
- Preceding Department: Department of Services and Property Department of Manufacturing Industry
- Dissolved: 22 December 1975
- Superseding Department: Department of Administrative Services (II)
- Jurisdiction: Commonwealth of Australia
- Headquarters: Canberra
- Department executive: Maurice Timbs, Secretary

The Department of Administrative Services was an Australian government department that existed between October 1975 and December 1975. It was the first so-named Commonwealth department, to be followed by three more.

== Scope ==
Information about the department's functions and government funding allocation could be found in the Administrative Arrangements Orders, the annual Portfolio Budget Statements and in the Department's annual reports.

According to the Administrative Arrangements Order made on 7 October 1975, the Department dealt with:

- Elections and referendums
- Provision of accommodation, staff and other facilities for members of the Parliament other than in Parliament House
- Australian Government purchasing policy
- Procurement and purchase of goods and services, as required, for Australian Government purposes
- Maintenance of stocks of any such goods
- Disposal of surplus goods
- Government transport and storage facilities in the States and storage and transport of goods in the Australian Capital Territory
- Advisory services on fire protection for Australian Government purposes in Australia

== Structure ==
The Department was an Australian Public Service department, staffed by officials who were responsible to the Minister for Administrative Services.
