= Graham Glenn =

Australian public servant (1933–2021)

Graham Glenn AO

Secretary of the Department of Administrative Services
- In office 24 July 1987 – 1 March 1989

Secretary of the Department of Industrial Relations
- In office 1 March 1989 – 6 March 1992

Personal details
- Born: Graham Gordon Glenn; 30 July 1933
- Died: 19 January 2021 (aged 87)
- Occupation: Public servant

Graham Gordon Glenn, AO (30 July 1933 – 19 January 2021) was an Australian senior public servant.

== Life and career ==
Graham Glenn joined the Commonwealth public service in 1950 as a cadet in the Department of Trade and Customs.

Glenn was appointed Commissioner of the Public Service Board as in 1984, having been with the Board since 1958 and previously having served as Deputy Commissioner starting in 1977.

In July 1987, Glenn was appointed Secretary of the Australian Government Department of Administrative Services, serving in that role until March 1989 when he was to become the Secretary of the Department of Industrial Relations. He was head of Industrial Relations until March 1992, In 1995, Glenn was appointed Chair of the ACT Bushfire Task Force, responsible for reviewing practices for bushfire fuel management in the ACT and for recommending appropriate policies and practices for future bushfire fuel management.

Glenn died on 19 January 2021, at the age of 87.

== Awards ==
In January 1993, Glenn was made an Officer of the Order of Australia. He was awarded the Centenary Medal in 2001 for service to Australian society through public service leadership.

Government offices
New title Department established	Secretary of the Department of Administrative Services; 1987 – 1989	Succeeded by Noel Tanzer
Preceded by Rae Taylor	Secretary of the Department of Industrial Relations; 1989 – 1992	Succeeded by Michael Costello
