= Department of Sport, Recreation and Tourism =

Australian government department, 1983–1987

Department overview
- Formed: 11 March 1983
- Preceding Department: Department of Industry and Commerce (II) Department of Home Affairs and Environment
- Dissolved: 24 July 1987
- Superseding Department: Department of the Arts, Sport, the Environment, Tourism and Territories Department of Administrative Services (III)
- Jurisdiction: Commonwealth of Australia
- Headquarters: Canberra
- Minister responsible: John Brown, Minister
- Department executive: Bruce MacDonald, Secretary

The Department of Sport, Recreation and Tourism was an Australian government department that existed between March 1983 and July 1987.

== History ==
The Department was one of three new Departments established by the Hawke government in March 1983, to ensure the priorities of the Labor government could be given effect to readily following the federal election of that month.

The Department was dissolved in July 1987 as part of a large overhaul of the Public Service that reduced the number of departments from 28 to 17. Its functions were dispersed between several departments, and the department's Secretary, Bruce MacDonald, was appointed to a senior position in the Data Protection Agency.

== Scope ==
Information about the department's functions and government funding allocation could be found in the Administrative Arrangements Orders, the annual Portfolio Budget Statements and in the Department's annual reports.

At its creation, the Department dealt with:

- Sport and recreation
- Tourism, including the tourist industry

== Structure ==
The Department was an Australian Public Service department, staffed by officials responsible to the Minister for Sport, Recreation and Tourism, John Brown.

The Secretary of the Department was Bruce MacDonald.
