= New Hampshire Department of Administrative Services =

Government agency in the U.S. state of New Hampshire

New Hampshire Department of Administrative Services (DAS)
Agency overview
- Formed: 1931
- Jurisdiction: New Hampshire
- Headquarters: 25 Capitol Street; Concord, New Hampshire
- Employees: 299 full-time (June 2021)
- Agency executive: Charles M. Arlinghaus, Commissioner
- Website: das.nh.gov

The New Hampshire Department of Administrative Services (DAS) is a state agency of the U.S. state of New Hampshire, headquartered in Concord. The department provides statewide management services for the New Hampshire state government. The department also prepares the Annual Comprehensive Financial Report (ACFR) for the state. The department is authorized as provided in New Hampshire Revised Statutes Annotated (NH RSA) Chapter 21-I.

== Organization ==
The department is organized into several divisions:

- Division of Financial Data Management
- Division of Public Works Design & Construction
- Division of Plant & Property Management
- Division of Accounting Services
- Division of Risk & Benefits
- Division of Personnel
- Division of Procurement & Support Services

There are also several administrative functions, including the State Budget Unit and the Cost Containment Unit.
