= Bruce McDonald (judge) =

Bruce P. McDonald (died May 10, 2005) was a provincial court judge in Manitoba, Canada. He resigned in 1993, following controversy about racist and sexist statements he had made from the bench.

== Early career ==
McDonald became a judge in Portage la Prairie in 1962. He was criticized in 1987 for issuing only a $500 fine in a drunk driving case that resulted in a man's death. By the 1990s, he was one of the last small-town resident judges in the province.

== Controversy ==
Three of McDonald's rulings in 1992-93 attracted widespread attention and condemnation. In August 1992, he declined a request for assistance from a woman who worked in the same office as her ex-boyfriend, whom she accused of harassment. McDonald was quoted as saying, "Ever thought of quitting work?". A few months later, the Winnipeg Free Press reported that McDonald declined a woman's request for a peace bond, and told her to "work something out" with the man she accused of assaulting her. The woman, a resident of the Sandy Bay Indian Reserve, said that she was humiliated by the experience, and that McDonald's comments made it seem as though she was at fault. Advocates for abused women said the incident made a mockery of Manitoba's zero tolerance rules against domestic violence.

In April 1993, McDonald ruled that a 73-year-old man who pleaded guilty to sexual assault against four of his relatives was motivated by "curiosity", and sentenced him to two years' probation. In response, several critics argued that McDonald was insensitive to issues of abuse. Ann McGillvray of the University of Manitoba said that his approach was "40 years out of date" and that he stood out "like a sore thumb" in Manitoba's judicial system. Provincial Justice Minister James McCrae announced a review into McDonald's sentence, and ordered the Manitoba Judicial Council to launch a broader review into McDonald's activities. McCrae also announced that he would overhaul the Judicial Council and introduce provincial legislation to ensure the better screening of judicial applicants. In June 1993, the appeals court overturned and denounced McDonald's ruling, and issued a six-month jail term against the defendant.

Further investigative reporting by the Winnipeg Free Press revealed that McDonald was known in the legal community for granting discharges in sexual assault cases. He frequently berated Royal Canadian Mounted Police officers for minor technical errors, and kept personal records on accused persons who appeared before him. Several lawyers refused to criticize him on the record, fearing repercussions if they appeared again in his courtroom.

McDonald was suspended on May 11, 1993, after chief provincial judge Kris Stefanson reviewed a transcript of remarks that he made in a December 1969 court hearing. During this case, McDonald said he was "distressed" that residents of the Long Plains Indian Band had refused to cooperate with the RCMP, and expressed "hope" that they would not receive RCMP help if they ever needed it. He then added, "[the] joyful result would be that the residents of the reserve would kill one another off". In the same transcript, McDonald said, "I am well aware of the fact that there is more violence on Indian reserves than anywhere else in the country. I am well aware of the fact that when an Indian [...] fights, (he) doesn't fight, he tries to massacre somebody. The amount of damage inflicted on various complainants is considerable, and if it weren't for the fact that most of them have the thickest skulls in the country, there would be many more possibilities of murder charges that would be incapable of being proved because all the witnesses hadn't seen anything." These remarks were widely condemned, with Assembly of Manitoba Chiefs leader Phil Fontaine saying that he was outraged by McDonald's behaviour.

As the scandal unfolded, it was reported that several complaints had been filed against McDonald in the previous decades. A transcript of McDonald's remarks was reportedly sent to chief provincial judge Harold Gyles after the 1969 case, although Gyles said that he never received the document. In 1978, Crown Attorney Bob Maxwell submitted a complaint alleging that McDonald showed bias against aboriginal Canadians, made derogatory remarks made from the bench, and was generally rude and unprofessional in his behaviour. Portions of this complaint were submitted to provincial Attorney-General Gerald Mercier and later forwarded to Gyles, who reprimanded McDonald in private and requested that he give up control of the docket to the Crown. McDonald complied, and a senior official in the Attorney-General's department described the matter as resolved. During this period, Gyles also told Mercier that a public inquiry would cause adverse publicity. Gyles later said that he did not investigate other complaints against McDonald during this period because they were not made in writing. Gord Mackintosh, opposition critic for the New Democratic Party, said that this explanation was not acceptable.

In 1987, the Manitoba Advisory Council on the Status of Women filed a complaint to Attorney-General Roland Penner about McDonald's handling of sexual assault cases. Penner referred MACSW to the Manitoba Judicial Council. Gyles, who served on the council, investigated the matter and sent McDonald a letter of admonition. Several complaints about McDonald were later submitted between 1988 and 1993.

== Aftermath ==
McDonald resigned in December 1993, just as the Judicial Council was about to begin an investigation into his activities. His resignation caused the immediate cancellation of the hearings. Rosemary Vodrey, who succeeded McCrae as Justice Minister, subsequently rejected requests for an independent inquiry. In 1994, she announced a policy change allowing judicial inquiries to continue after a judge's retirement, if it is in the public interest.

Ruth Teichrob won a Manitoba Human Rights Award in late 1993 for her coverage of the McDonald controversy.

McDonald died on May 10, 2005, at age 86.
