= Department of Local Government and Administrative Services =

Australian government department, 1984–1987

Department overview
- Formed: 13 December 1984
- Preceding Department: Department of Administrative Services (II) – for functions relating to the acquisition, leasing, management and disposal of land and property; survey; transport and storage; accommodation; catering and protective services; Department of Industry and Commerce (II) – for regional development Department of Territories and Local Government – for local government
- Dissolved: 24 July 1987
- Superseding Department: Department of Immigration, Local Government and Ethnic Affairs – for local government and regional development services; Department of Administrative Services (III) – Transport and storage, land and property services, purchasing and disposals, accommodation and catering, valuation and protective services and survey functions
- Jurisdiction: Commonwealth of Australia
- Headquarters: Canberra
- Minister responsible: Tom Uren, Minister
- Department executive: Kenneth Norman Jones, Secretary

The Department of Local Government and Administrative Services was an Australian government department that existed between December 1984 and July 1987.

== Scope ==
Information about the department's functions and government funding allocation could be found in the Administrative Arrangements Orders, the annual Portfolio Budget Statements and in the department's annual reports.

According to the Administrative Arrangements Order made on 13 December 1984, the department dealt with:

- Matters relating to local government
- Regional development
- Acquisition, leasing, management and disposal of land and property in Australia and overseas
- Survey
- Government transport and storage
- Civil purchasing
- Disposal of goods
- Provision of accommodation and catering
- Protective services at Commonwealth establishments

The department at times produced films, including in 1983–84 a film titled RSI: The New Industrial Epidemic.

== Structure ==
The department was an Australian Public Service department, staffed by officials who were responsible to the Minister for Local Government and Administrative Services, Tom Uren.

The Secretary of the Department was Kenneth Norman Jones.
