= Department of Territories (1951–1968) =

Australian government department, 1951–1968

Department overview
- Formed: 11 May 1951
- Preceding Department: Department of the Interior (II) – for Ashmore and Cartier Islands, Northern Territory; Department of External Territories (I) – all other functions
- Dissolved: 28 February 1968
- Superseding Department: Department of the Interior (II); Department of External Territories (II)
- Jurisdiction: Commonwealth of Australia
- Ministers responsible: Paul Hasluck, Minister (1951–1963); Charles Barnes, Minister (1963–1968)
- Department executives: Cecil Ralph Lambert, Secretary (1951–1964); George Warwick Smith, Secretary (1964–1968)

The Department of Territories was an Australian government department that existed between May 1951 and February 1968.

== Scope ==
The department's functions were:

- Administration of territories:
  - Ashmore and Cartier Islands
  - Nauru
  - New Guinea
  - Norfolk Island
  - Northern Territory
  - Papua
- Australian New Guinea Production Control Board
- Australian School of Pacific Administration
- British Phosphate Commissioners
- Christmas Island Phosphate Commission
- Expropriated Properties (New Guinea)
- Shipping services to certain Pacific islands
- Shipping services within the Territories of Papua and New Guinea
- Transfer of prisoners from the external territories and the Northern Territory

== Structure ==
The department was a Commonwealth Public Service department, staffed by officials who were responsible to the Minister for Territories.
