= Department of Services and Property =

Australian government department, 1972–1975

Department overview
- Formed: 19 December 1972
- Preceding Department: Department of the Environment, Aborigines and the Arts – for control of land and property outside Australia Department of Labour and National Service – for union ballots Department of the Interior (II) – for electoral and property and survey matters Department of Works (III) – for Commonwealth Fire Board
- Dissolved: 7 October 1975
- Superseding Department: Department of Urban and Regional Development – for control, use and management of land and property, engineering and topographical surveys Department of Administrative Services (I) – for all other functions
- Jurisdiction: Commonwealth of Australia
- Minister responsible: Fred Daly, Minister
- Department executives: George Warwick Smith, Acting Secretary (1972–1973); Maurice Timbs, Secretary (1973–1975)

The Department of Services and Property was an Australian government department that existed between December 1972 and October 1975.

== History ==
The Department was established under the Whitlam government; at the time people commented with amazement that the first new department created by the Whitlam government in Australia was the Department of Property.

== Scope ==
Information about the department's functions and government funding allocation could be found in the Administrative Arrangements Orders, the annual Portfolio Budget Statements and in the Department's annual reports.

At its creation the Department was responsible for the following:

- Elections and referendums
- Provision of accommodation, staff and other facilities for members of the Parliament other than in Parliament House
- Acquisition and leasing of land and property in Australia of elsewhere for Commonwealth purposes management and disposal of property so acquired of leased
- Land, engineering and topographical surveys for Commonwealth purposes

== Structure ==
The Department was an Australian Public Service department, staffed by officials who were responsible to the Minister for Services and Property, Fred Daly.
