= Peter Lawler (public servant) =

Australian senior public servant and diplomat

Sir Peter Lawler OBE

Secretary of the Department of the Special Minister of State
- In office 9 January 1973 – 22 December 1975

Secretary of the Department of Administrative Services
- In office 22 December 1975 – 25 March 1983

Personal details
- Born: Peter James Lawler; 23 March 1921
- Died: 1 April 2017 (aged 96) Canberra
- Spouse(s): (1) Patricia Thornton (died 1957); (2) Mary Robinson
- Children: Geraldine, Anthony, Mary, Peter, John Lawler, CEO of the Australian Crime Commission, Gerard (died at birth 1957); Michael, Christopher
- Occupation: Public servant

Sir Peter James Lawler OBE (23 March 1921 – 1 April 2017) was an Australian senior public servant and diplomat. He served in senior roles under Prime Ministers Menzies, Holt, McEwen, Gorton, McMahon, Whitlam, Fraser and Hawke, and ended his career as Ambassador to Ireland and the Holy See.

== Career ==
Peter Lawler was born on 23 March 1921. He was educated at St Joseph's College Hunters Hill, St Stanislaus College, Bathurst, and the University of Sydney, graduating in economics.

He joined the Department of Postwar Reconstruction in 1944, then the Prime Minister's Department in 1950. In 1951, along with Kenneth Herde, he was seconded to the UK Cabinet Office in London to do research on the workings of government, with a view to bringing back ideas that could be applied within the Australian context. He remained there until 1953, and also undertook postgraduate training in several European cities. Lawler's and Herde's recommendations led to Robert Menzies' decision to establish a Cabinet Office in Canberra as a separate and discrete part of the Prime Minister's Department.

He became a Deputy Secretary of the Prime Minister's Department in 1964. He wrote the 1966 Cabinet decision that led to the abolition of the White Australia policy. In October 1967, as Acting Secretary, he was involved in the VIP aircraft affair that threatened the premiership of Menzies' successor Harold Holt, but used his experience and shrewdness to protect himself and escape the odium that was visited on Sir John Bunting.

In 1968, Prime Minister John Gorton made the Cabinet Office a department in its own right (generally believed to be his way of sidelining Sir John Bunting), and Lawler joined it as Deputy Secretary to Bunting, remaining there until March 1971 when the new prime minister William McMahon merged it with the Prime Minister's Department to create the new Department of the Prime Minister and Cabinet.

From 1972 to 1975, Peter Lawler was Secretary of the Department of the Special Minister of State, serving the Whitlam government, then Secretary of the Department of Administrative Services from 1975 to 1983, serving the Fraser government.

After Sir Robert Mark's report on the organisation of protective services in the wake of the February 1978 Sydney Hilton bombing, the Fraser government set up a small taskforce, headed by Peter Lawler, to implement the recommended creation of the Australian Federal Police.

In March 1983, the incoming Hawke government appointed Lawler Ambassador to the Republic of Ireland and Ambassador to the Holy See, serving until his retirement in 1986. He was resident in Ireland, except for four months prior to Pope John Paul II's visit to Australia. Lawler lobbied to have the post of Ambassador to the Holy See permanently resident in Rome, but this did not occur until Tim Fischer's appointment in 2008.

He was a Member of the Council of the Australian Academy of Forensic Sciences for many years.

== Personal life ==
Lawler was a Catholic with open Australian Labor Party affiliations. He became a patron of the Australian Family Association in 2008. He and his wife were named Australian Family of the Year by the Association. He was also a Cooperator of the Prelature of the Holy Cross and Opus Dei.

He married Mary Thornton in 1944. She gave him six children, but both mother and son Gerard died at his birth in 1957. In 1958, he married Mary Robinson, and two more children followed. Lawler's family home was destroyed in the 2003 Canberra bushfires.

Lawler died on 1 April 2017, aged 96, survived by his seven surviving children from two marriages, and their offspring.

== Honours ==
Lawler was appointed an Officer of the Order of the British Empire (OBE) in the 1965 New Year's Honours.

He was knighted in the 1981 Birthday Honours.

In 1986 he received the papal honour of Knight Grand Cross of the Order of Pius IX.

He was awarded the Centenary Medal on 1 January 2001.

Government offices
Preceded by John Bunting (Acting)	Secretary of the Department of the Special Minister of State; 1973–1975	Department abolished
New title Department established	Secretary of the Department of Administrative Services; 1975–1983	Succeeded by Kenneth Norman Jones
Diplomatic posts
Preceded by Lloyd Thomson	Australian Ambassador to the Holy See; 1983–1986	Succeeded by Christopher Stephen Knott as Chargé d'affaires
Preceded by Lloyd Thomson	Australian Ambassador to Ireland; 1983–1986	Succeeded by Frank Milne
