= Department of the Arts and Administrative Services =

Australian government department, 1993–1994

Department overview
- Formed: 24 March 1993
- Preceding Department: Department of the Arts, Sport, the Environment and Territories Department of Administrative Services (III)
- Dissolved: 30 March 1994
- Superseding Department: Department of Administrative Services (IV) Department of Communications and the Arts
- Jurisdiction: Commonwealth of Australia
- Headquarters: City, Canberra
- Minister responsible: Bob McMullan, Minister
- Department executives: Noel Tanzer, Secretary (1993); Andrew Podger, Secretary (1993–1994)

The Department of the Arts and Administrative Services was an Australian government department that existed between March 1993 and January 1994.

== Scope ==
Information about the department's functions and government funding allocation could be found in the Administrative Arrangements Orders, the annual Portfolio Budget Statements and in the Department's annual reports.

At the department's creation it was responsible for:

- Acquisition, leasing, management and disposal of land and property in Australia and overseas
- Transport and storage services
- Coordination of purchasing policy and civil purchasing
- Disposal of goods
- Analytical laboratory services
- Ionospheric prediction
- Management of government records
- Valuation services
- Geodesy, mapping and surveying services
- Planning, execution and maintenance of Commonwealth Government works
- Design and maintenance of Government furniture, furnishings and fittings
- Government printing and publishing services
- Electoral matters
- Australian honours and symbols policy
- Provision of facilities for members of Parliament other than in Parliament House
- Administrative support for Royal Commissions and certain other inquiries
- Information co-ordination and services within Australia, including advertising
- Cultural affairs, including support for the arts

== Structure ==
The Department was an Australian Public Service department, staffed by officials who were responsible to the Minister for the Arts and Administrative Services.
