= Department of External Territories (1968–1973) =

Former Australian government department

Department overview
- Formed: 20 February 1968
- Preceding Department: Department of Territories (I)
- Dissolved: 30 November 1973
- Superseding Department: Department of Foreign Affairs – for residual responsibilities relating to Papua New Guinea
- Jurisdiction: Commonwealth of Australia
- Headquarters: Canberra
- Ministers responsible: Charles Barnes, Minister (1968–1972); Andrew Peacock, Minister (1972); Gough Whitlam, Minister (1972); Bill Morrison, Minister (1972–1973)
- Department executives: George Warwick Smith, Secretary (1968–1970); David Hay, Secretary (1970–1973)

The Department of External Territories was an Australian government department that existed between February 1968 and November 1973. It was the second Australian Government department to be given the name.

== History and scope ==
The Department of External Territories was established by the Gorton government in 1968, formed from the portions of the old Department of Territories (I) that dealt with Papua New Guinea and Australia's smaller external territories and hiving off the portions of the department that dealt with Northern Territory.

According to the Administrative Arrangements Order made on 20 December 1972, the department dealt with matters related to the Territory of Papua, the Territory of New Guinea, the Territory of Cocos (Keeling) Islands and the Territory of Christmas Island.

== Structure ==
The department was an Australian Public Service department, staffed by officials who were responsible to the Minister for External Territories.
