= Department of Administrative Services (1987–1993) =

Australian government department, 1987–1993

Department overview
- Formed: 24 July 1987
- Preceding Department: Department of Housing and Construction (III) – for Government works, furniture, furnishings and fittings; Department of Sport, Recreation and Tourism – for information coordination and services Department of Territories (II) – for the Parliament House Construction Authority; Department of Science (III) – for meteorology, ionospheric prediction and analytical laboratory services Department of Resources and Energy – for geodosy and mapping function Department of Arts, Heritage and Environment – for responsibility for the Australian Archives
- Dissolved: 24 March 1993
- Superseding Department: Department of the Arts and Administrative Services
- Jurisdiction: Commonwealth of Australia
- Headquarters: Belconnen, Canberra
- Department executives: Graham Glenn, Secretary (1987–1989); Noel Tanzer, Secretary (1989–1993)

The Department of Administrative Services was an Australian government department that existed between July 1987 and March 1993. It was the third Australian government department bearing this name.

== History ==
The department was created in July 1987 after the abolishment of several departments and was known as a "super ministry."

== Scope ==
Information about the department's functions and government funding allocation could be found in the Administrative Arrangements Orders, the annual Portfolio Budget Statements and in the department's annual reports.

According to the Administrative Arrangements Order made on 24 July 1987, the department dealt with:

- Acquisition, leasing, management and disposal of land and property in Australia and overseas
- Transport and storage services
- Co-ordination of purchasing policy and civil Purchasing
- Disposal of goods
- Provision of accommodation and catering
- Protective services at Commonwealth establishments
- Analytical laboratory services
- Meteorology Ionospheric prediction
- National Archives
- Valuation services
- Geodesy, mapping and surveying services
- Planning, execution and maintenance of Commonwealth Government works
- Design and maintenance of Government furniture, furnishings and fittings
- Information co-ordination and services within Australia, including printing, publishing and advertising
- Electoral matters
- Australian honours and symbols policy
- Provision of facilities for members of Parliament other than in Parliament House
- Administrative support for Royal Commissions and certain Committees of Inquiry.

== Structure ==
The department was an Australian Public Service department, staffed by officials who were responsible to the Minister for Administrative Services.

The secretary of the department was initially Graham Glenn, with Noel Tanzer succeeding him on 1 March 1989. Tanzer's mandate was to have the department work as a unit and begin to operate in accordance with commercial principles.
