= Department of the Arts, Sport, the Environment, Tourism and Territories =

Australian government department, 1987–1991

Department overview
- Formed: 24 July 1987
- Preceding Department: Department of Sport, Recreation and Tourism Department of Arts, Heritage and Environment
- Dissolved: 27 December 1991
- Superseding Department: Department of the Arts, Sport, the Environment and Territories – for all functions except tourism Department of Tourism – for tourism
- Jurisdiction: Commonwealth of Australia
- Headquarters: Canberra
- Department executive: Tony Blunn, Secretary

The Department of the Arts, Sport, the Environment, Tourism and Territories was an Australian government department that existed between July 1987 and December 1991.

== Scope ==
Information about the department's functions and government funding allocation could be found in the Administrative Arrangements Orders, the annual Portfolio Budget Statements and in the Department's annual reports.

At its creation, the Department dealt with:

- Cultural affairs, including support for the arts
- National collections
- National heritage
- Sport and recreation
- Environment and conservation
- Tourism, including the tourist industry, international expositions and support for international conferences and special events
- Administration of the Australian Capital Territory
- Administration of the Jervis Bay Territory, the Territory of Cocos (Keeling) Islands, the Territory of Christmas Island, the Coral Sea Islands Territory, the Territory of Ashmore and Cartier Islands, the Australian Antarctic Territory, and the Territory of Heard Island and the McDonald Islands, and of Commonwealth responsibilities on Norfolk Island
- Constitutional development of the Northern Territory of Australia

== Structure ==
The Department was an Australian Public Service department, staffed by officials responsible to the Minister for the Arts, Sport, the Environment and Tourism and Territories.
