= Department of Administrative Services (1975–1984) =

Australian government department, 1975–1984

Department overview
- Formed: 22 December 1975
- Dissolved: 13 December 1984
- Superseding Department: Department of Sport, Recreation and Tourism Department of Local Government and Administrative Services
- Jurisdiction: Commonwealth of Australia
- Headquarters: Canberra
- Department executives: Peter Lawler, Secretary (1975–1983); Kenneth Norman Jones, Secretary (1983–1984)

The Department of Administrative Services was an Australian government department that existed between December 1975 and December 1984. It was the second so-named Commonwealth department.

== Scope ==
Information about the department's functions and government funding allocation could be found in the Administrative Arrangements Orders, the annual Portfolio Budget Statements and in the department's annual reports.

According to the Administrative Arrangements Order made on 22 December 1975 (reproduced by the National Archives), the department dealt with:

- Provision of accommodation, staff and other facilities for members of the Parliament other than in Parliament House
- Procurement and purchase of goods and services, as required, for Australian Government purposes
- Maintenance of stocks of any such goods
- Disposal of surplus goods Government transport and storage facilities in the States and storage and transport of goods in the ACT
- Advisory services on fire protection for Australian Government purposes in Australia
- Government publicity and information
- Government printing, publishing and advertising
- Acquisition, leasing and disposal of land and property, including office accommodation, in Australia and overseas for Australian Government purposes
- Land, engineering and topographical surveys for Australian Government purposes
- Royal Commissions Matters relating to the Territory of Cocos (Keeling) Islands, the Territory of Christmas Island, Norfolk Island and the Coral Sea Island Territory
- National Museums
- National Archives
- Grants to national organisations
- Support for international conferences
- World expositions
- War graves
- Elections and referendums.

== Structure ==
The department was an Australian Public Service department, staffed by officials who were responsible to the Minister for Administrative Services.
