= Charles Hector McFadyen =

Australian soldier, public servant, and sportsman

Charles Hector McFadyen CBE
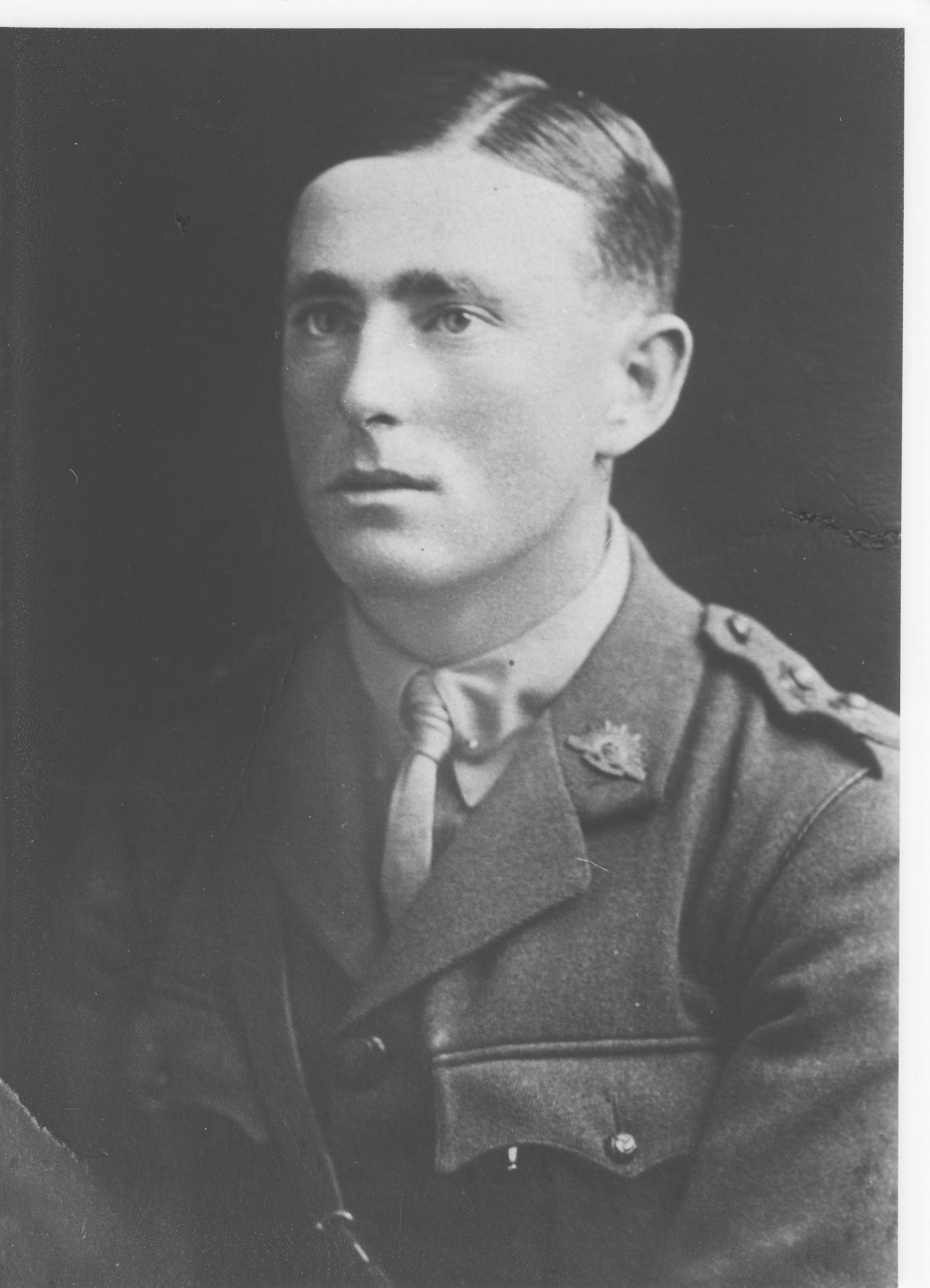

Secretary of the Department of Shipping & Fuel
- In office 21 December 1948 – 16 March 1950

Secretary of the Department of Fuel, Shipping & Transport
- In office 16 March 1950 – 11 May 1951

Secretary of the Department of Shipping & Transport
- In office 11 May 1951 – 29 October 1957

Personal details
- Born: Charles Hector McFadyen; 29 October 1892 Kensington, Victoria
- Died: 26 August 1965 (aged 72) Parkville, Victoria
- Resting place: Springvale Botanical Cemetery, Victoria
- Occupation: Public servant
Australian rules football career
Personal information
- Debut: Round 3, 1920, Essendon vs. South Melbourne, at East Melbourne Cricket Ground
- Height: 178 cm (5 ft 10 in)
Playing career^{1}
Years	Club	Games (Goals)
1920	Essendon	4 (2)
- ^{1} Playing statistics correct to the end of 1920.

Charles Hector McFadyen CBE (29 October 1892 – 26 August 1965) was an Australian soldier, senior public servant and sportsman. He was a leading community figure in Canberra from inception until 1939 when he returned to Melbourne. He is best known for his time heading the Department of Shipping & Transport.

In 1920, he played four games with the Essendon Football Club in the Victorian Football League (VFL).

== Life and career ==
McFadyen was born on 29 October 1892 in Melbourne, the son of Alexander McFadyen, railway worker, and his wife Mary Elizabeth. They lived in the suburb of Ascot Vale. Charles was the eldest of three children, with two sisters, Doris and Maude. The family name is Scottish, with the McFadyens a sept of the Maclaine clan and with ancestral association with Mull, one of the Scottish Inner Hebrides. Charles attended Moreland State School and in 1906 won one of eight scholarships awarded by the Victorian Education Department. He attended Scotch College in 1907. The following year he joined the Victorian public service as a telegraph messenger and in 1911 following success in the Commonwealth Public Service Clerical Examination was appointed a clerk in the Department of Trade & Customs at its railway shipping shed, Spencer Street.

McFadyen was an active and gregarious young man, nicknamed 'Chub' because of his solid build and complexion. He was a member of the Flemington Presbyterian Church youth group, the Jolly Beggars (after the cantata by Burns), played sport, notably cricket and Australian Rules Football, and enjoyed summer visits to the beach at Frankston. The Australian Natives Association with its requirement of Australian birth became a lifelong involvement with its debating contests and involvement in topical issues. Charles was president of the Flemington Branch in 1915, aged only 22, and again in 1922.

=== Sport, Military and war service ===
In 1911, McFadyen joined the Victorian Scottish Regiment, trained at Albert Park and went on marches and bivouacs with the 52nd Battalion. On 12 May 1915 he enlisted in the First Australian Imperial Force with the Second Australian Casualty Clearing Station (2nd ACCS), 8th Field Ambulance. McFadyen was photographed in military uniform at this time and described as tall with brown hair, blue eyes and 'of good physique and military appearance.' On 23 November the unit embarked on the troop ship Ceramic with McFadyen as a Warrant Officer First Class bound for Egypt, en route to Gallipoli. Owing to the evacuation he spent nearly three months in Egypt before being moved on to France and the Western Front in the early summer of 1916.

The commander of the 2nd ACCS was Lieutenant Colonel Harold Skipton Stacy, who recruited McFadyen. The unit was, in Charles' later recollections, the most efficient of its kind in forward battle areas in WW1. Stacy was a Sydney Hospital surgeon who brought practical experience and the latest methods to bear on the treatment of the wounded in the field. In this he received strong support from the Australian Red Cross. Stacy enlisted specialist personnel and secured resources for the work. McFadyen, who was a soldier, was one of the unit's few non-medical officers and involved in general administration. Casualty clearing stations were located typically at rail heads or transportation hubs in forward areas. Their role was to provide emergency treatment and to move the wounded back to stationary and general hospitals. Because of the static trench warfare that developed in France in the early summer of 1916 the 2nd ACCS became more of a stationary hospital. 'We were established on a Belgian farmer's property at Trois Arbres near Steenwerck alongside the railway from Bailleul to Armentieres. With the aid of engineers and Belgian labourers the field was quickly transformed into a modern operating centre within 10 miles of the front line and less in a few places.' Stacy had arranged for an X-ray plant, technician and engineers from the Sydney Hospital. He set up a workshop that made splints and thigh cases and, eventually, the station was supplied with electric light. The X-ray plant was the first of its kind in any CCS in France. A steam cooker from the Red Cross supplied food. Qualified surgeons and physicians were added. It was 'the showpiece of the Army Corps and there were continual inspections by high-ranking French and British military and medical personnel.' McFadyen recalled that 'Stacy was far too good for the ordinary run of medical officers' and that he returned to Australia 'without proper recognition.' Stacy contracted influenza early in 1917 and applied for release citing financial and family reasons. This was granted and his appointment terminated on 19 July 1917. The unit he had established continued, however. McFadyen was promoted Lieutenant Quartermaster with the 8th Field Ambulance based at Albert Somme, France, in February 1917. He attained the rank of Quartermaster and Honorary Captain in August 1918.

McFadyen saw the war's brutal consequences first hand and would have experienced many of the privations and dangers of field life in forward locations. At the same time he was not involved directly in the fighting, working instead in administration and provisioning. He enjoyed periods of leave in Paris, Belgium and, notably after the Armistice, other places in Europe, Germany, the United Kingdom and Ireland before returning to Australia on the Bremen on 25 July 1919. McFadyen played sport at a high level during the war, notably Australian Rules football and rugby with the 8th Field Ambulance Rugby team in France in 1917. This was, in his view, 'possibly the best rugby side (as a unit) in the ANZAC corps' and 'would have beaten any club team in NSW or QLD.' He was fullback in the team that won the 5th Division championship after the Armistice. As an athlete he won the 5th Division officers 100 yard sprint. He particularly enjoyed leave in Charleroi, attending opera in Brussels and the music halls in Paris where he heard the young Maurice Chevalier sing the Madelon de la Victoire and also the singer's older patron and lover, Mistinguett. He retained an affection for the French and things French all his life. Years later, in 1956, he would again seek out Chevalier after a performance at the Casino de Paris. In all, he spent four full years abroad and was billeted in locations in Belgium, England and Ireland awaiting return to Australia. McFadyen participated in the farewell march of Australian soldiers through London on 25 April 1919. A photograph of Charles newly demobilised taken in Melbourne in 1919 shows him fit, healthy and handsome. He resumed an active life. In his short VFL Australian Rules football career he played four games for Essendon in 1920, in which he scored two goals. In the 1920–21 seasons he played first grade cricket for Essendon under A.G. 'Johnny' Moyes. On 22 of November, 1922, he married Rose Craig the daughter of Walter and Margaret Jones of Essendon. On 12 February 1923 his father, Alexander, died, aged 54.

McFadyen enlisted for part-time duties on 12 June 1942 in World War II and was discharged on 10 October 1945

=== Public service career ===
McFadyen rejoined the Commonwealth Public Service on demobilisation in 1919. He was transferred to Canberra together with his young family in the first big move of government departments and staff to the new Australian capital in 1927 to work with the Department of Trade & Customs and rented a newly built home near Telopea Park. He took on a variety of professional, sporting and community activities, revealing a capacity for leadership. Later, he and his family moved to Barton. Probably, it was his WW1 field hospital experience that led him to become prominent in the movement for a new Canberra hospital. The administration of the Australian Capital Territory was the responsibility of the Federal Capital Commission until it was dissolved in 1929 when the Government of Stanley Bruce was defeated. The former Minister for Health, Billy Hughes, had instigated a board for the Canberra Hospital with John Crapp as its first chairman. Two board members were nominated by Hughes and Mrs Pattie Tillyard and Charles McFadyen were elected by public vote. Charles was re-elected in 1938. In the same year, the Acting Minister for Health, Archie Cameron, dissolved the nominee board and created a wholly elected body, of which McFadyen became chairman. Charles persuaded the Minister for Health Frederick Stewart and the Treasurer Percy Spender to have an amount placed on the forward estimates to enable a hospital to be built at a later date. McFadyen resigned from the Hospital Board in December 1939 when in his public service capacity he was transferred to Melbourne. The new Canberra hospital on Acton Peninsula on Lake Burley Griffin was commenced in 1940 and completed in 1943.

McFadyen was a leading figure in Canberra in other ways as well. He was the first president of the Federal Capital Territory branch of the Commonwealth Public Service Clerical Association, president of the Canberra branch of the Australian Labor Party for four years and campaigned for representation for Canberra citizens in the Commonwealth Parliament. In 1931, he was narrowly defeated as one of two ALP candidates for the three-person Canberra Advisory Council. This was the extent of representation offered the Territory for the Seat of Government as the Australian Capital Territory was then known. At this stage Canberra residents had no direct representation in the Federal Parliament. Another concern of his was the high cost of living in the new capital for low waged public servants compared with Melbourne or Sydney. He was president of the Canberra Public Service Welfare Committee. McFadyen came to be considered as a possible Labor candidate for the Federal seat of Eden-Monaro and was encouraged by Prime Minister James Scullin but full ALP endorsement was not forthcoming. He remained a leading ANA member and played competitive sport, notably football, tennis and cricket. In 1928, aged 36 and disappointed with performances of his local Australian Rules Football Club, Eastlake, he donned his boots once again. That same year Eastlake took out the premiership. McFadyen was Vice President of the Australian Capital Territory Cricket Association and in 1936 led a Canberra XI against a test strength touring English team led by Gubby Allen at Manuka Oval. His mother, Mary Elizabeth McFadyen, of 259 Beaconsfield Parade, Middle Park. a widow, died on 10 May 1940.

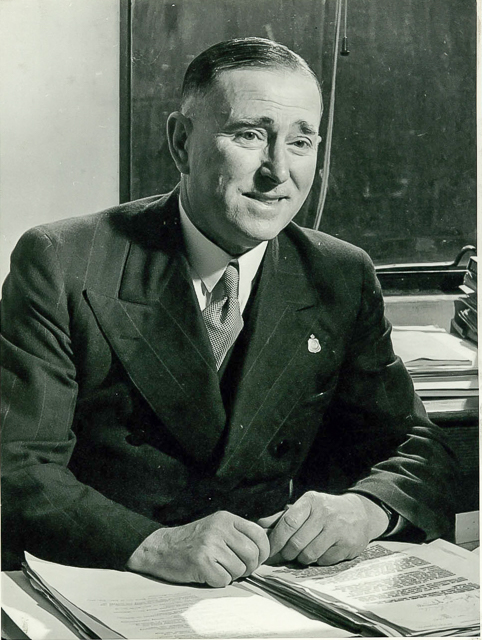
Charles H. McFadyen in 1957.

In his public service capacity McFadyen was Chairman of the Tariff Advisory Committee, 1935–39. This was a post Ottawa Agreement committee established by the United Kingdom and Australian governments. In 1939 he was transferred to Melbourne as Trade and Customs liaison officer to the Department of Supply & Development under Professor Jim Brigden, later Munitions under John Jensen, to which he was transferred in 1941. McFadyen chaired the Tallow Advisory Committee, 1942–44, composed of industry and government representatives. Its purpose was to ensure adequate supplies of glycerine for munitions purposes for the war effort. In 1944 he was appointed Deputy Controller of Materials and Supply with the Department of Munitions. As deputy director of the Secondary Industries Division from 1945 he developed the NSW Division of Industrial Development. In this capacity he was responsible for mining, shipping and ports. His son, Ken, recalled he moved around a lot and at this time was living in Manly and working in Martin Place, Sydney. In 1948, McFadyen acted as Director of the Division of Industrial Development in the Department of Post-War Reconstruction during the absence of the Director Harold Breen. He was appointed Secretary of the Department of Shipping & Fuel in December 1948. Under his leadership, the department became the Department of Fuel, Shipping & Transport in March 1950, and then the Department of Shipping & Transport in May 1951, fuel rationing having been abolished following Menzies' election victory in 1949. McFadyen was a member of the Australian Shipbuilding Board 1949–50. Issues in these years included the lack of efficient coastal shipping services, particularly for Western Australia, Tasmania and Queensland. Charles formed close personal and professional friendships with many notable industry figures. Arthur Deakin of the shipbuilding firm of Evans Deakin was a close friend. McFadyen presided over a conference held in Launceston in 1954 to inquire into Tasmanian shipping and freights. He served two ministers directly in his capacity as a departmental head, the South Australian George McLeay and Western Australian Senator Shane Paltridge. McFadyen has little positive to say in his recollections about McLeay who died in 1955.

In one instance McLeay asked McFadyen to chair the Cargo Clearance Committee for the Port of Melbourne. Sheds were being used for storage rather than transit and shipping had begun to build up. The Prime Minister R. G. Menzies had expressed concern. McFadyen was reluctant to involve himself in what was a State matter but did as he was requested. Disagreement between Customs and the Melbourne Harbor Trust representatives on the CCC was the issue. McLeay then caved in to ship owner and Harbor Trust complaints about McFadyen's chairmanship and in 1952 disbanded the committee. This was despite expert commentary praising the committee's work. ‘I cleared the port and in the process stood on a few corns,’ Charles recalled and added: ‘I have an idea the P.M. was not happy about McLeay’s treachery.’ Paltridge, his Minister from 1955, he held in high regard. Charles believed his advice and Paltridge's advocacy in Federal cabinet were instrumental in the government's decision to create the Australian National Line. McFadyen remained Secretary of the Department of Shipping and Transport until his retirement, aged 65, in October, 1957, when he was succeeded by D.C. Williams. He appears to have had no difficulties with Liberal and Country Party administrations and was well regarded by Menzies, his early involvement with and sympathy for the Australian Labor Party notwithstanding. Also, by his departmental peers and senior political and industry figures, if testimonials on the occasion of his 1955 CBE honour and retirement are any indication. Unlike other permanent heads of his time he was not offered a knighthood. A lifelong public servant, he had the distinction of joining as a junior by way of competitive examination and rising to the top. The year following his retirement he joined the Board of Mercury Transport Ltd. McFadyen was a genial man, a keen reader and follower of horse racing. His clubs included the Caulfield Returned Servicemen's League, Canberra Golf Club and the Essendon Commercial Travellers Association. The 1960 Credit Squeeze had an impact on his investments and savings. His last residence was 3 Newton Court, St Kilda.

Charles Hector McFadyen died on 26 August 1965 following a series of strokes. He was survived by his sisters Maude and Doris (Mrs J.E. McKeddie), his wife Rose, sons Ken and Alan (now all deceased) and a daughter, Marie Rose (Mrs J.K.Dunstan).

== Awards ==
In the 1955 Queen's Birthday Honours, McFadyen was made a Commander of the Order of the British Empire for services as Secretary of the Department of Shipping and Transport.

Government offices
Preceded by George Sutcliffe	Secretary of the Department of Shipping & Fuel; 1948 – 1950	Succeeded by Himself as Secretary of the Department of Fuel, Shipping & Transport
Preceded by Himself as Secretary of the Department of Shipping & Fuel	Secretary of the Department of Fuel, Shipping & Transport; 1950 – 1951	Succeeded by Himself as Secretary of the Department of Shipping &Transport
Preceded by A.W. Paul as Secretary of the Department of Transport	Secretary of the Department of Fuel, Shipping & Transport; 1950 – 1951	Succeeded by Himself as Secretary of the Department of Shipping &Transport
Preceded by Himself as Secretary of the Department of Fuel, Shipping and Transport	Secretary of the Department of Shipping & Transport; 1951 – 1957	Succeeded by Dudley Williams
