= Department of Supply and Development =

Department of Supply and Development may refer to:

- Department of Supply and Development (1939–42), an Australian government department
- Department of Supply and Development (1948–50), an Australian government department
