= Arthur Corbett (public servant) =

Australian public servant

Arthur Corbett MBE

Director-General of the Department of Civil Aviation
- In office 3 April 1939 – 16 February 1944

Personal details
- Born: Arthur Brownlow Corbett; 18 February 1877 New Shoreham, Essex, England
- Died: 20 March 1970 (aged 93) Kangaroo Point, Brisbane, Queensland, Australia
- Resting place: Toowong Cemetery
- Spouse(s): Evelyn Mary Byrne (m. 1905)
- Occupation: Public servant

Arthur Brownlow Corbett MBE (18 February 1877 – 20 March 1970) was a senior Australian public servant. He was Director-General of the Department of Civil Aviation from April 1939 until February 1944.

== Life and career ==
Corbett was born to parents Susan Ellen (née Kerr) and George Frederick Corbett on 18 February 1877 at New Shoreham, Sussex, England. He was educated at Ardingly College. He and his family migrated to Queensland, Australia in 1890.

As an electrical and mechanical engineer, Corbett held several roles in the Postmaster-General's Department, including to reorganise the Brisbane mail services in 1924, and as superintendent of mails in Sydney in 1927.

On 3 April 1939, Corbett began his term as Director-General of the Department of Civil Aviation, moving to Melbourne to take up the role but planning to return to Queensland on his retirement.

In February 1944, a new Director-General was appointed for the Department of Civil Aviation, with Corbett continuing as Acting Director-General until August 1944.

Corbett died on 20 March 1970 at Kangaroo Point in Brisbane and was buried at Toowong Cemetery.

== Awards ==
In January 1938, Corbett was appointed a Member of the Order of the British Empire for his service as Deputy Director in the Queensland branch of the Postmaster-General's Department.

Government offices
Preceded by Frederick Shedden as Secretary of the Department of Defence	Director-General of the Department of Civil Aviation; 1939 – 1944	Succeeded by Daniel McVey
