= Arthur Smith (public servant) =

Australian public servant

Arthur Smith CBE

Secretary of the Department of Supply and Development
- In office 1 July 1941 – 17 October 1942

Secretary of the Department of Supply and Shipping
- In office 17 October 1942 – 11 April 1945

Personal details
- Born: Arthur Sydney Victor Smith; 22 January 1893 Coburg, Melbourne
- Died: 9 February 1971 (aged 78) Darlinghurst, Sydney
- Spouse(s): Gladys Lavina Muriel Ford (m. 1918–1971; his death)
- Occupation: Public servant

Arthur Sydney Victor Smith CBE (22 January 1893 – 9 February 1971) was a senior Australian public servant. He was Secretary of the Department of Supply and Development from 1941 to 1942.

== Life and career ==
Arthur Smith was born in Coburg, Melbourne on 22 January 1893.

Smith began his Commonwealth Public Service career in the Postmaster-General's Department when he was 14.

Smith was appointed Secretary of the Department of Supply and Development in July 1941. In this role, he spent March to June 1942 in Washington, at first to secure greater collaboration between Australia, Britain and the United States in fighting the war in the Pacific. When the Pacific War Council was established, Smith was Australia's representative at council meetings.

When the Department of Supply and Development was abolished and the Department of Supply and Shipping was set up in its place, Smith became head of the new department.

Smith died in Darlinghurst, Sydney on 9 February 1971.

== Awards ==
Smith was appointed a Commander of the Order of the British Empire in January 1951.

Government offices
Preceded by Jim Brigden	Secretary of the Department of Supply and Development; 1941 – 1942	Succeeded by Himself as Secretary of the Department of Supply and Shipping
Preceded by Himself as Secretary of the Department of Supply and Development	Secretary of the Department of Supply and Shipping; 1942 – 1945	Succeeded by Giles Chippindall
