= George Sutcliffe =

Australian public servant

George Sutcliffe CBE

Secretary of the Department of Shipping and Fuel
- In office 6 April 1948 – 21 December 1948

Personal details
- Born: George Gribbon Sutcliffe; 2 February 1895 Coburg, Melbourne, Victoria, Australia
- Died: 10 December 1964 (aged 69) Goulburn, New South Wales, Australia
- Education: University of Melbourne
- Occupation: Public servant

George Gribbon Sutcliffe CBE (2 February 1895 – 10 December 1964) was a senior Australian public servant, best known for his time as a Commissioner of the Commonwealth Public Service Board.

== Life and career ==
Sutcliffe was born in Coburg, Melbourne on 2 February 1895 to parents Mary Sutcliffe (née Perryman) and John Sutcliffe. He joined the Commonwealth Public Service in the Postmaster-General's Department at the age of 14.

Between April and December 1948, Sutcliffe was Secretary of the Department of Shipping and Fuel. He was then appointed a Commissioner of the Public Service Board, and moved to Canberra.

He retired from the Public Service Board in 1960, and was appointed Commonwealth Coordinator of the Good Neighbour movement.

Sutcliffe died of a coronary occlusion on 10 December 1964 in Goulburn, New South Wales, where he was attending a meeting of the council of the Diocese of Canberra and Goulburn. He was buried in Canberra cemetery.

== Awards ==
Sutcliffe was appointed a Commander of the Order of the British Empire in the 1956 Queen's Birthday Honours for his public service.

Government offices
Preceded by Frank O'Connor as Department of Supply and Shipping	Secretary of the Department of Shipping and Fuel; 1948	Succeeded by Charles Hector McFadyen
