= Trevor Housley =

Australian public servant (1910–1968)

Trevor Housley CBE

Director-General of the Postmaster-General's Department
- In office 9 December 1965 – 10 October 1968

Personal details
- Born: Trevor Alfred Housley; 31 October 1910 Gympie, Queensland
- Died: 10 October 1968 (aged 57) Kew, Melbourne, Victoria
- Resting place: Boroondara Cemetery
- Spouse: Susan Maureen Reilly (m. 1935)
- Occupation: Public servant

Trevor Alfred Housley CBE (31 October 1910 – 10 October 1968) was a senior Australian public servant. He was Director-General of the Postmaster-General's Department from 1965 until his death in October 1968.

== Life and career ==
Trevor Housley was born on 31 October 1910 in Gympie, Queensland.

Housley served for four years as chief airways engineer in the Department of Civil Aviation, until 1951 when he joined the Overseas Telecommunications Commission (OTC) as assistant general manager. In 1956, he was appointed to OTC general manager. In the general manager role, Housley led a delegation to the Commonwealth Telecommunications Conference in 1958 which recommended a worldwide telephone cable system be developed. He returned to London in 1960 to convene a management committee responsible for plans to lay the British Commonwealth trans-Pacific cable between Australia and New Zealand.

Housley was appointed Director-General of Posts and Telegraphs, heading the Postmaster-General's Department, in 1965.

In 1967, he penned Communications in Modern Society, in which he argued that if public administrators could shift from paper communication to phone-calls, it would streamline the service and enable "quickly responsive sensitivity to public need".

At Kew, Melbourne on 10 October 1968, while still in office as Director-General of the Postmaster-General's Department, Housley died of an intracranial haemorrhage.

== Awards and honours ==
1961, Housley was appointed a Commander of the Order of the British Empire.

In 2012, a street in the Canberra suburb of Casey was named Housley Street in Trevor Housley's honour.

Government offices
Preceded by Frank O'Grady	Director General of the Postmaster-General's Department; 1965 – 1968	Succeeded by John Knott
