= John Armstrong (Australian politician) =

Australian politician and diplomat

The Honourable John Armstrong AC
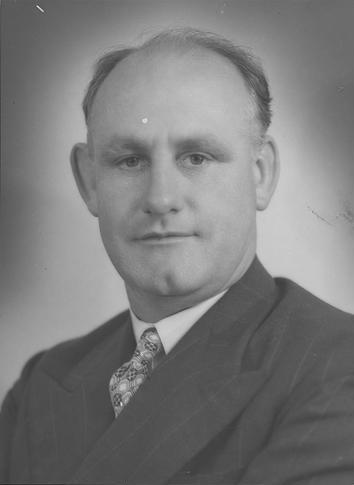

Senator for New South Wales
- In office 1 July 1938 – 30 June 1962

Minister for Munitions
- In office 1 November 1946 – 6 April 1948
- Prime Minister: Ben Chifley
- Preceded by: John Dedman

Minister for Supply and Development
- In office 6 April 1948 – 19 December 1949
- Prime Minister: Ben Chifley
- Preceded by: Bill Ashley
- Succeeded by: Richard Casey

72nd Lord Mayor of Sydney
- In office 4 December 1965 – 13 November 1967
- Deputy: Henry Albert Burland; Joseph Anthony Bradford
- Preceded by: Harry Jensen
- Succeeded by: Vernon Treatt

High Commissioner to the United Kingdom
- In office 28 January 1973 – 31 January 1975
- Preceded by: Alick Downer
- Succeeded by: John Bunting

Personal details
- Born: 10 July 1908 Ultimo, New South Wales, Australia
- Died: 10 March 1977 (aged 68) Batemans Bay, New South Wales, Australia
- Party: Labor
- Spouse: Joan Curran (m. 1945)

John Ignatius Armstrong AC (10 July 1908 – 10 March 1977) was an Australian politician and diplomat. He served as a Senator for New South Wales from 1938 to 1962, representing the Labor Party, and was a minister in the Chifley government. Armstrong later served as Lord Mayor of Sydney from 1965 to 1967, and then as High Commissioner to the United Kingdom from 1973 to 1974.

== Early life ==
Armstrong was born into a large Roman Catholic family in the Sydney suburb of Ultimo to William and Ellen (née Hannan) Armstrong, both emigrants from Ireland. He was educated at St Bede's School, Pyrmont, and at the Marist Brothers' High School, Darlinghurst. In 1934, he was elected as an alderman of Sydney Municipal Council, representing the Labor Party until 1948.

== Political career ==
Armstrong was selected for Labor's slate of candidates for the Australian Senate for the 1937 election partly because his name would appear high on the alphabetic ballot and he was duly elected, effective from July 1938. He married Joan Therese Josephine Curran in October 1945.

During 1945, Prime Minister John Curtin's health greatly deteriorated but politicians and the media declined to publicly discuss Curtin's health for fear of concerning the Australian public during World War II. As a result, Armstrong gave a speech in the Senate on 13 June which included the first public reference to Curtin's health, and left the Australian public surprised.

He was appointed Minister for Munitions in Ben Chifley's November 1946 ministry. In April 1948, his portfolio was merged with the Supply functions of Bill Ashley's portfolio to create the portfolio of Supply & Development and he was attacked by the opposition for the breadth of his powers. Following Labor's defeat at the 1949 election, he became deputy-leader of the Opposition in the Senate. He was relegated to an unwinnable fourth position on Labor's ticket for the 1961 election and left parliament in July 1962.

== Later life ==
Armstrong was elected Lord Mayor of Sydney in 1966, but the position was abolished by the Askin government in 1967. The Whitlam government appointed him Australian High Commissioner to the United Kingdom from 1973 to 1974. In 1977, he was made a Companion of the Order of Australia.

He died of a myocardial infarction in Batemans Bay, aged 68, survived by his wife, a son and four daughters.

Political offices
| Preceded by John Dedman | Minister for Munitions; 1946–1948 | Post abolished |
| Preceded by Bill Ashley | Minister for Supply and Development; 1948–1949 | Succeeded by Richard Casey |
Government offices
| Preceded by | Chairman of the Sydney County Council; 1963–1965 | Succeeded by |
Civic offices
| Preceded by Harry Jensen | Lord Mayor of Sydney; 1965–1967 | Succeeded by Vernon Treatt as Chief Commissioner |
Diplomatic posts
| Preceded by Sir Alexander Downer | Australian High Commissioner to the United Kingdom; 1973–1974 | Succeeded by Sir John Bunting |
