= Department of Community Services =

Former Australian government department, 1984–1987

Department overview
- Formed: 13 December 1984
- Preceding Department: Department of Social Security – for the Office of Aged Care, Child Care and Disabled and the Social Welfare Policy Secretariat; Department of Health (I) – for nursing homes, home nursing and assistance for the disabled
- Dissolved: 24 July 1987
- Superseding Department: Department of Community Services and Health – for services for the aged, persons with disabilities, children; community support services; Department of Social Security – for some pieces of legislation
- Jurisdiction: Commonwealth of Australia
- Headquarters: Phillip, Canberra
- Ministers responsible: Don Grimes, Minister (1984–1987); Chris Hurford, Minister (1987)
- Department executives: Tony Ayers, Acting Secretary (1984–1985); Mike Codd, Secretary (1985–1986); Alan Rose, Secretary (1986–1987)

The Department of Community Services was an Australian government department that existed between December 1984 and July 1987.

== Scope ==
Information about the department's functions and government funding allocation could be found in the Administrative Arrangements Orders, the annual Portfolio Budget Statements and in the department's annual reports.

At its creation, the department was responsible for:

- Coordination of income security and community services policies
- Services for the aged, disabled people and children
- Community support services

== Structure ==
The department was an Australian Public Service department, staffed by officials who were responsible to the Minister for Community Services, initially Don Grimes (until February 1987) and then Chris Hurford.
