= Department of the Environment and Heritage =

Former Australian Government department

Department overview
- Formed: 21 October 1998
- Preceding Department: Department of the Environment (II) Department of Communications and the Arts
- Dissolved: 30 January 2007
- Superseding Department: Department of the Environment and Water Resources
- Jurisdiction: Commonwealth of Australia
- Headquarters: Canberra
- Ministers responsible: Robert Hill, Minister (1998–2001); David Kemp, Minister (2001–2004); Ian Campbell, Minister (2004–2007)
- Department executives: Roger Beale, Secretary (1998–2004); David Borthwick, Secretary (2004–2007)

The Department of the Environment and Heritage was an Australian Government department that existed between October 1998 and December 2007.

== Scope ==
Information about the department's functions and government funding allocation could be found in the Administrative Arrangements Orders, the annual Portfolio Budget Statements, in the department's annual reports and on the department's website.

At its creation, the department was responsible for:

- Environment and conservation
- Meteorology
- Administration of the Australian Antarctic Territory and the Territory of Heard Island and McDonald Islands
- Natural and built heritage
- Greenhouse policy coordination

== Structure ==
The department was an Australian Public Service department, staffed by officials who were responsible to the Minister for the Environment and Heritage. The department was headed by a secretary, initially Roger Beale (until early 2004) and then David Borthwick.
