= Robert Scott (public servant) =

Australian public servant

Sir Robert Scott ISO

Secretary of the Postmaster-General's Department
- In office 1901 – December 1910

Personal details
- Born: Robert Townley Scott; 30 December 1841 Dorney, Buckinghamshire, England
- Died: 3 August 1922 (aged 80) Brisbane, Queensland
- Resting place: Toowong cemetery
- Spouse(s): Ellen Wright (m. 1868)
- Occupation: Public servant

Sir Robert Townley Scott ISO (30 December 1841 – 3 August 1922) was a senior official in the Australian Public Service. He was appointed Secretary of the Postmaster-General's Department in 1901, the year of Australia's Federation.

== Life and career ==
Scott was born on 30 December 1841 in Dorney, Buckinghamshire, England. He and his family emigrated to Australia in 1848, arriving in Brisbane in December of that year.

Scott was appointed first secretary of the new Australian Government Postmaster-General's Department, by fellow Brisbanite James Drake, prompting allegations of state bias.

Robert Scott died in his home in Brisbane on 3 August 1922.

== Awards ==
Scott was awarded an Imperial Service Order in May 1903. In December 1909 he was appointed a Knight Bachelor.

Government offices
New title Department established	Secretary of the Postmaster-General's Department; 1901 – 1910	Succeeded by Justinian Oxenham
