= Van Vanthoff =

Australian public servant (1894–1967)

Van Vanthoff OBE

Director-General of the Postmaster-General's Department
- In office 21 May 1958 – 31 December 1958

Personal details
- Born: Percival Evert Russell Vanthoff; 12 January 1894 Cobram, Victoria
- Died: 30 July 1967 (aged 73) Richmond, Melbourne, Victoria
- Spouse: Ruby Ella Shanks (m. 1924)
- Occupation: Public servant

Percival Evert Russell "Van" Vanthoff OBE (12 January 1894 – 30 July 1967) was a senior Australian public servant. He was Director-General of the Postmaster-General's Department from May until December 1958.

== Life and career ==
Van Vanthoff was born in Cobram, Victoria on 12 January 1894 to parents Isaac and Mary Jane Vanthoff.

In World War I, Vanthoff served in the Australian Naval and Military Expeditionary Force.

He was appointed Director-General of Posts and Telegraphs, heading the Postmaster-General's Department, in May 1958. In the role, he oversaw development of an automatic teleprinter switching system for telegraphs, and worked to provide a six-tube coaxial cable between Sydney and Melbourne. Vanthoff retired in December 1958.

Vanthoff died on 30 July 1967 in Richmond, Melbourne.

== Awards ==
In January 1955 Vanthoff was appointed an Officer of the Order of the British Empire.

Government offices
Preceded by Giles Chippindall	Director General of the Postmaster-General's Department; 1958	Succeeded by Mervyn Stradwick
