= Department of the Environment, Sport and Territories =

Australian government department, 1993–1997

Department overview
- Formed: 24 March 1993
- Preceding Department: Department of the Arts, Sport, the Environment and Territories
- Dissolved: 9 October 1997
- Superseding Department: Department of Transport and Regional Development – for territories Department of Industry, Science and Tourism – for sport and recreation Department of the Environment (II) – for environment
- Jurisdiction: Commonwealth of Australia
- Headquarters: Canberra
- Department executives: Stuart Hamilton, Secretary (1993–1996); Roger Beale, Secretary (1996–1997)

The Department of the Environment, Sport and Territories (also called DEST) was an Australian government department that existed between March 1993 and October 1997.

== Scope ==
Information about the department's functions and government funding allocation could be found in the Administrative Arrangements Orders, the annual Portfolio Budget Statements and in the Department's annual reports.

According to the Administrative Arrangements Order made on 24 March 1993, the Department dealt with:

- Sport and recreation
- Environment and conservation
- Meteorology
- Administration of the Australian Capital Territory
- Administration of the Jervis Bay Territory, the Territory of Cocos (Keeling) Islands, the Territory of Christmas Island, the Coral Sea Islands Territory, the Territory of Ashmore and Cartier Islands, and of Commonwealth responsibilities on Norfolk Island
- Constitutional development of the Northern Territory of Australia
