= Bruce Hamilton (public servant) =

Australian public servant (1911–1989)

Bruce Hamilton CBE

Secretary of the Department of Social Services
- In office 1 January 1966 – 19 December 1972

Secretary of the Department of Social Security
- In office 20 December 1972 – 9 January 1973

Personal details
- Born: Leslie Bruce Hamilton; 4 July 1911 Nook, Tasmania
- Died: 12 June 1989 (aged 77) Acton, Canberra, Australian Capital Territory
- Spouse(s): Amy Mary Adam (m. 1936–1975; her death); Isobel Elizabeth Dahl (m. 1976–1989; his death)
- Parent(s): George Hamilton and Margaret Ann, née Peters
- Occupation: Public servant

Leslie Bruce Hamilton CBE (4 July 1911 – 12 June 1989) was an Australian senior public servant and head of the Department of Social Services (later Social Security) between 1966 and 1973.

== Life and career ==
Bruce Hamilton was born in Nook, Tasmania on 4 July 1911 to parents George Hamilton and Margaret Ann, née Peters.

Hamilton began his Australian Public Service career in 1939 as Army Paymaster for Tasmania. He moved to Canberra in 1940.

On 1 January 1966, Hamilton was appointed Secretary of the Department of Social Services. When the Whitlam government was elected, the department was abolished and the new Department of Social Security established. Hamilton was Secretary of the new department for less than a month before he retired. During his time as head of the Social Services department, Hamilton broadened the department's scope by introducing legislation for deserted wives, for home care and for emergency relief.

Hamilton's death was on 12 June 1989 at the Royal Canberra Hospital.

== Awards ==
Hamilton was made an Officer of the Order of the British Empire in 1966 whilst a First Assistant Secretary at the Department of the Treasury. In June 1972 he was appointed a Commander of the Order of the British Empire during his time as Director-General of the Social Services Department.

Government offices
Preceded by Herbert Goodes	Secretary of the Department of Social Services; 1966 – 1972	Succeeded by Himself as Secretary of the Department of Social Security
Preceded by Himself as Secretary of the Department of Social Services	Secretary of the Department of Social Security; 1972 – 1973	Succeeded by Louis Wienholt
