= Stuart Hamilton (public servant) =

Australian senior public servant and CEO

Stuart Hamilton AO

Secretary of the Department of Community Services and Health
- In office 1 August 1988 – 7 June 1991

Secretary of the Department of Health, Housing and Community Services
- In office 7 June 1991 – 23 December 1993

Secretary of the Department of the Environment, Sport and Territories
- In office 24 March 1993 – 11 March 1996

Personal details
- Born: Stuart Anthony Hamilton; 31 March 1950 (age 76) Hobart, Tasmania
- Education: University of Tasmania; University of Oxford; Australian National University
- Occupation: Public servant, lobbyist, CEO

Stuart Anthony Hamilton AO (born 31 March 1950) is a retired Australian senior public servant and CEO.

== Early life ==
Stuart Hamilton was born in 1950 in Hobart, Tasmania, the son of Murray and Yvonne Hamilton. He attended the University of Tasmania gaining a First Class Honours degree in Arts, majoring in English Language and Literature. He then attended Magdalen College Oxford University as the Tasmanian Rhodes Scholar for 1971, where he met and married Suzanne Westrop, a classicist studying at St Hilda’s College. They have two children. He subsequently attended the Australian National University, gaining a Bachelor of Economics in 1980.

== Career ==
Hamilton joined the Australian public service in 1975. He worked in several departments, notably the Department of the Prime Minister and Cabinet, becoming Deputy Secretary there in 1987. He was closely involved in developing the major changes to ministerial and departmental arrangements announced by Prime Minister Bob Hawke after the 1987 election .

In 1988, Hamilton was appointed Secretary of the Department of Community Services and Health. He stayed on in the role when the Department transitioned to become the Department of Health, Housing and Community Services in 1991.

Between 1993 and 1996, Hamilton was Secretary of the Department of the Environment, Sport and Territories.

When the Howard government was elected in 1996, Hamilton was one of six departmental secretaries to be sacked from their positions.

From 1996 to 2001 he was Executive Director of the Australian Vice-Chancellors' Committee (now Universities Australia). In 2001 he became Secretary of the Victorian (State) Department of Education and Training. From 2003 to 2012 he was CEO of Open Universities Australia. He retired from full-time employment in February 2012.

He was a member of the Council of Deakin University from 2012 until 2024, and has been on the boards of several not-for-profit organisations including (as at June 2025) the Accountability Round Table, Radio 3MBS-FM and Genesis Baroque.

== Awards and honours ==
In January 1995, Hamilton was made an Officer of the Order of Australia in recognition of service to public administration and public sector reform.

Government offices
Preceded by Tony Ayers	Secretary of the Department of Community Services and Health; 1988–1991	Succeeded by Himself as Secretary of the Department of Health, Housing and Community Services
Preceded by Himself as Secretary of the Department of Community Services and Health	Secretary of the Department of Health, Housing and Community Services; 1991–1993	Succeeded by Tony Cole as Secretary of the Department of Health, Housing, Local Government and Community Services
Preceded by Tony Blunn as Secretary of the Department of the Arts, Sport, the Environment and Territories	Secretary of the Department of the Environment, Sport and Territories; 1993–1996	Succeeded by Roger Beale
