= Tony Ayers =

Australian public servant

Tony Ayers AC

Secretary of the Department of Aboriginal Affairs
- In office 20 July 1979 – 5 May 1981

Department of Social Security
- In office 21 May 1981 – 14 November 1986

Acting Secretary of the Department of Community Services
- In office 13 December 1984 – 13 March 1985

Secretary of the Department of Community Services and Health
- In office 24 July 1987 – 31 July 1988

Secretary of the Department of Defence
- In office 1 August 1988 – 5 February 1998

Personal details
- Born: Anthony Joseph Ayers; 16 September 1933
- Died: 11 April 2016 (aged 82)
- Spouse: Heather Ayers
- Occupation: Public servant

Anthony Joseph "Tony" Ayers AC (16 September 1933 – 11 April 2016) was an Australian public servant.

== Life and career ==
Ayers was born on 16 September 1933. His first job was teaching in a Victorian school. He later was an education officer in Pentridge Prison, Melbourne.

In 1967 Ayers moved to Canberra as Director of Welfare in the Department of the Interior.

He was appointed to his first Secretary role in 1979 as head of the Department of Aboriginal Affairs. Ayers moved soon after, in 1981, to the Department of Social Security (DSS). During his time at DSS he served concurrently for three months as Acting Secretary of the Department of Community Services. Ayers moved to an appointment as Secretary of the Department of Community Services and Health when the Hawke government restructured the public service and created "super ministries" in 1987.

Ayers' final posting in the Australian Public Service was as Secretary of the Department of Defence between 1988 and 1998. Ayers was praised for his work in the Department, one of the few departmental heads who has left the Department of Defence of their own accord, rather than being compelled to leave by the Defence Minister, in the last 30 years.

Ayers died on 11 April 2016.

== Awards ==
Ayers was made an Officer of the Order of Australia in June 1985. In January 1993 he was promoted to a Companion of the Order of Australia, in recognition of service to leadership in the development and implementation of administrative structures, systems and procedures.

Government offices
Preceded by David Hay	Secretary of the Department of Aboriginal Affairs; 1979–1981	Succeeded by John Taylor
Preceded by Pat Lanigan	Secretary of the Department of Social Security; 1981–1986	Succeeded by Derek Volker
New title Department established	Acting Secretary of the Department of Community Services; 1984–1985	Succeeded by Mike Codd
Preceded by Bernard McKay as Secretary of the Department of Health	Secretary of the Department of Community Services and Health; 1987–1988	Succeeded by Stuart Hamilton
Preceded by Alan Rose as Secretary of the Department of Community Services	Secretary of the Department of Community Services and Health; 1987–1988	Succeeded by Stuart Hamilton
Preceded by Alan Woods	Secretary of the Department of Defence; 1988–1998	Succeeded by Paul Barratt
