= Department of Civil Aviation (Australia) =

Australian government department, 1938–1973

Department overview
- Formed: 24 November 1938
- Preceding Department: Department of Defence
- Dissolved: 30 November 1973
- Superseding Department: Department of Transport (III)
- Jurisdiction: Commonwealth of Australia
- Headquarters: Victoria
- Department executives: Arthur Corbett, Director–General (1939–1944); Daniel McVey, Director–General (1944–1946); Richard Williams, Director–General (1946–1955); Don Anderson, Director–General (1956–1973); Charles Halton, Director–General (1973)

The Department of Civil Aviation (also called the DCA) was an Australian government department that existed between November 1938 and November 1973.

== History ==
The Department of Civil Aviation had its origins as the Civil Aviation Branch of the Department of Defence, which was established on 28 March 1921, after Parliament passed the Air Navigation Act 1920 in December 1920.

The organisation was reformed as a separate government department after the enquiry into the 1938 Kyeema Crash. When created in 1938, the department was organised into seven branches: Administration, Transport Services and Legislation, GroundOrganisation, Electrical Engineering, Aeronautical Engineering, Flying Operations and Accounts and Stores. Arthur Brownlow Corbett was appointed Director-General of Civil Aviation in April 1939, serving until his retirement in August 1944. From June 1946 to December 1955 the Director-General was Richard Williams, a former Royal Australian Air Force Chief of the Air Staff. Donald George Anderson held the position of Director-General from January 1956 until September 1973.

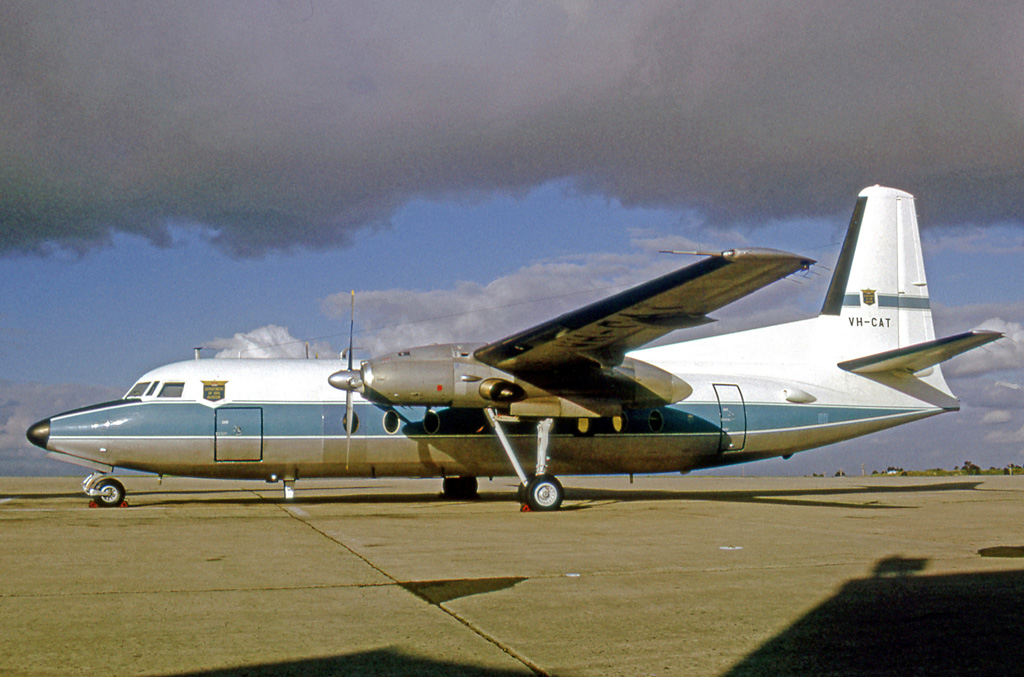
Fokker F.27 Friendship of the Australian DCA at Melbourne's Essendon Airport in 1970

On 30 November 1973 the DCA merged with the Department of Shipping and Transport and became the Department of Transport, Air Transport Group. The amalgamation was after the Second Whitlam Ministry agreed that this could achieve closer coordination of policies in the transport field and facilitate a more effective determination of the expenditure priorities and resources allocation.

== Structure and scope ==
The department was an Australian Public Service department responsible to the minister for civil aviation. The department was headed by the director-general.

Information about the department's functions and government funding allocation could be found in the Administrative Arrangements Orders, the annual portfolio budget statements and in the department's annual reports.

The department dealt with matters relating to civil aviation and administered related legislation.

== List of ministers ==
#	Name	Party	Start	End	PM
1	Harold Thorby	Country	24 November 1938	26 April 1939	Lyons; Page
2	James Fairbairn	United Australia	26 April 1939	13 August 1940	Menzies
3	Arthur Fadden	Country	14 August 1940	28 October 1940	Menzies
4	John McEwen	Country	28 October 1940	7 October 1941	Menzies; Fadden
5	Arthur Drakeford	Labor	7 October 1941	19 December 1949	Curtin; Forde; Chifley
6	Thomas White	Liberal	19 December 1949	11 May 1951	Menzies
7	Larry Anthony	Country	11 May 1951	9 July 1954	Menzies
8	Athol Townley	Liberal	9 July 1954	24 October 1956	Menzies
9	Shane Paltridge	Liberal	24 October 1956	10 June 1964	Menzies
10	Denham Henty	Liberal	10 June 1964	26 January 1966	Menzies
11	Reginald Swartz	Liberal	26 January 1966	12 November 1969	Holt; McEwen; Gorton
12	Bob Cotton	Liberal	12 November 1969	5 December 1972	Gorton; McMahon
13	Gough Whitlam	Labor	5 December 1972	19 December 1972	Whitlam
14	Charles Jones	Labor	19 December 1972	30 November 1973	Whitlam

== See also ==
- Airservices Australia § History
- Civil Aviation Safety Authority

== References and further reading ==
- DCA Annual Report 1961-62 Introduction, The Airways Museum & Civil Aviation Historical Society, archived from the original on 8 August 2011
- DCA Annual Report 1962-63 Introduction, The Airways Museum & Civil Aviation Historical Society, archived from the original on 8 August 2011
- DCA Annual Report 1950-52, The Airways Museum & Civil Aviation Historical Society, archived from the original on 8 August 2011
- DCA Annual Report 1948-49 Foreword, The Airways Museum & Civil Aviation Historical Society, archived from the original on 8 August 2011
- DCA Annual Report 1947-48 Introduction, The Airways Museum & Civil Aviation Historical Society, archived from the original on 8 August 2011
