= Frank Rowe (public servant) =

Australian public servant (1895–1958)

Frank Rowe CBE

Director-General of the Department of Social Services
- In office 9 April 1941 – 24 May 1958

Personal details
- Born: Francis Harry Rowe; 20 October 1895 Bright, Victoria
- Died: 24 May 1958 (aged 62) East Melbourne, Victoria
- Occupation: Public servant

Francis Harry Rowe CBE (20 October 1895 – 24 May 1958) was a senior Australian public servant, best known for his time as Director-General of the Department of Social Services.

== Life and career ==
Frank Rowe was born in Bright, Victoria on 20 October 1895.

In March 1917, Rowe enlisted in the First Australian Imperial Force and was assigned to a position in the Army Medical Corps. He was discharged in September that year.

In 1918 he joined the Commonwealth Public Service in the Repatriation Department, as a clerk.

Between April 1941 and his death in May 1958, Rowe was head of the Department of Social Services. He took over from Jim Brigden who had held the position only nominally since the idea of national insurance had been considered two years before, but the Department had never functioned. For this reason, Rowe's first act as Director-General was to engage staff.

In 1945, Rowe traveled to Canada, representing Australia, to advise the Canadian Ministry of National Health and Welfare on Australia's social services. While in the country, Rowe explored the possibility of a reciprocity of social services, like the arrangement in place between Australia and New Zealand.

Rowe died in a Melbourne hospital on 24 May 1958 after a short illness.

== Awards and honours ==
In June 1953 Rowe was made a Commander of the Order of the British Empire for his service as Director-General of the Social Services department.

In November 1958 Howard A. Rusk from the World Rehabilitation Fund announced the Fund had established the Frank Rowe Memorial Fellowship to honour Rowe as one of the pioneer leaders of rehabilitation.

Government offices
Preceded by Jim Brigden	Director-General of the Department of Social Services; 1941 – 1958	Succeeded by Herbert Goodes
