= Laurie Daniels =

Australian public servant

Laurie Daniels CB, OBE

Secretary of the Department of Social Security
- In office 27 July 1973 – 19 August 1977

Secretary of the Department of the Capital Territory
- In office 19 August 1977 – 10 August 1981

Personal details
- Born: Lawrence John Daniels; 11 August 1916 Adelaide
- Died: 16 September 1994 (aged 78)
- Spouse: Joyce
- Children: Eight daughters and two sons
- Occupation: Public servant

Lawrence John Daniels CB, OBE (11 August 1916 – 16 September 1994) was a senior Australian public servant and policymaker.

== Life and career ==
Laurie Daniels was born in Adelaide on 11 August 1916. He left school, for Sydney, at the age of 17 and won an Australian Public Service job at the Australian Taxation Office (ATO). Daniels moved to Canberra in 1946 with the ATO.

In 1973, Daniels was appointed Secretary of the Department of Social Security, where he stayed until 1977. In 1977 he became Secretary of the Department of the Capital Territory, serving a five-year term.

At the end of his Department of Capital Territory appointment, Daniels retired, having served 47 years in the public service.

Daniels died of cancer on 16 September 1994.

== Awards and honours ==
Daniels was made an Officer of the Order of the British Empire in 1972. In 1979 he was appointed a Companion of the Order of the Bath.

In 2009, the Australian Catholic University established the Laurie Daniels Scholarship to commemorate Daniels' life and his contribution to the University, particularly as a founding member of the University Senate.

Government offices
Preceded by Louis Wienholt	Secretary of the Department of Social Security; 1973–1977	Succeeded by Pat Lanigan
Preceded by Lou Engledow	Secretary of the Department of the Capital Territory; 1977–1981	Succeeded by Tony Blunn
