= Justinian Oxenham =

Australian public servant

Justinian Oxenham ISO

Secretary of the Postmaster-General's Department
- In office 1 January 1911 – 17 December 1923

Personal details
- Born: 23 April 1860 Warwick, Queensland
- Died: 27 March 1932 (aged 71) Kew, Melbourne, Victoria
- Resting place: Boroondara General Cemetery
- Spouse: Annie Elizabeth Robinson (m. 1885)
- Occupation: Public servant

Justinian Oxenham ISO (23 April 1860 – 27 March 1932) was a senior Australian public servant. He was Secretary of the Postmaster-General's Department from January 1911 until December 1923.

== Life and career ==
Oxenham was born in Warwick, Queensland, on 23 April 1860.

In the year of Australia's federation, Oxenham was appointed as Chief Clerk of the Postmaster-General's Department.

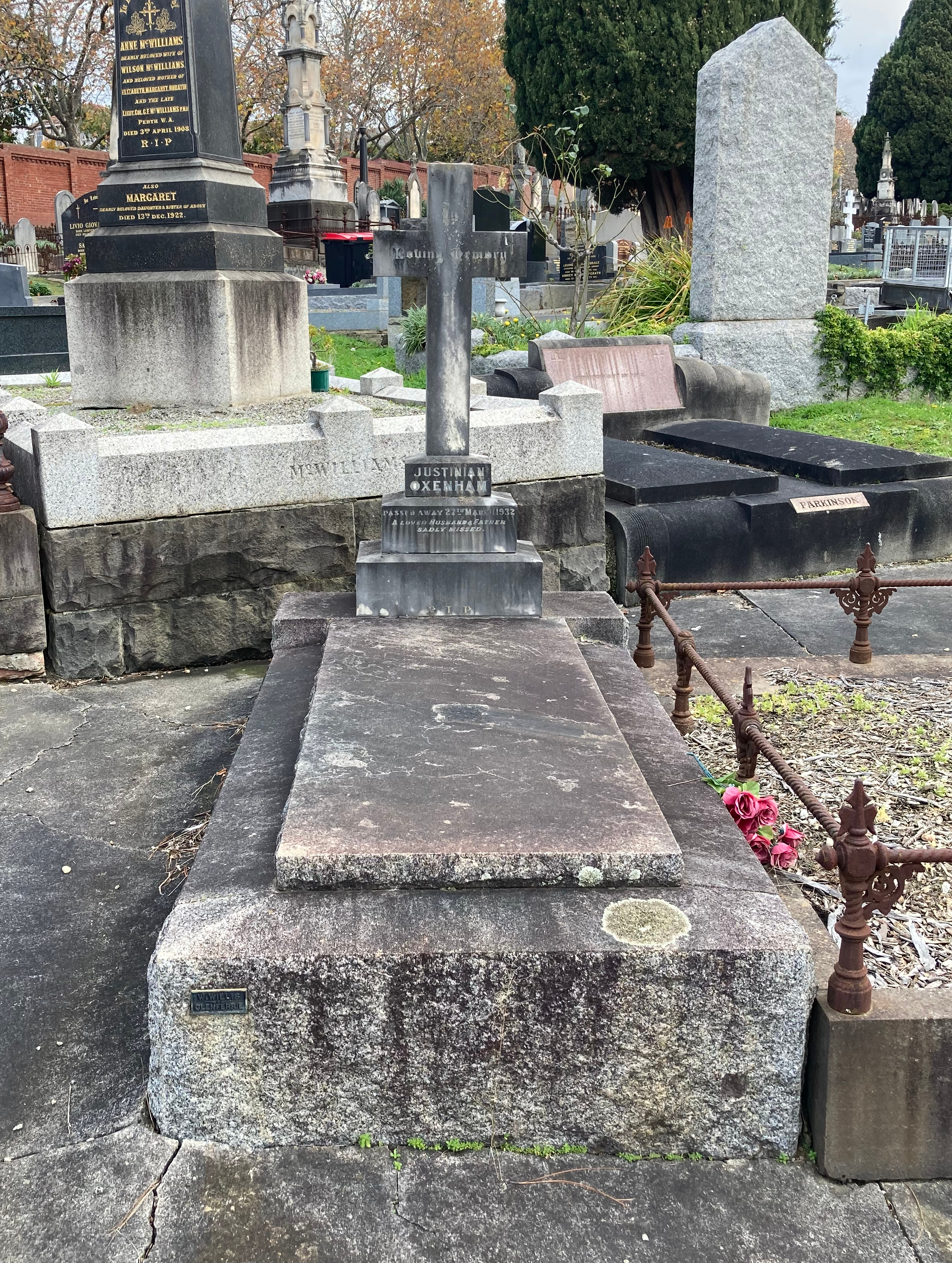
Oxenham's grave at Boroondara General Cemetery

In January 1911 he was promoted to Secretary, heading the Postmaster-General's Department. In the position, he represented the Commonwealth at the International Postal Conference in Madrid in February 1921.

Oxenham retired from the Commonwealth Public Service in 1923.

On 27 March 1932, Oxenham died at home in Charles Street Kew, Melbourne. He was buried at Boroondara General Cemetery.

== Awards ==
Oxenham was awarded the distinction of the Imperial Service Order for his public service.

Government offices
Preceded by Robert Scott	Secretary of the Postmaster-General's Department; 1911 – 1923	Succeeded by Harry Brown
