= Frank O'Grady =

Australian public servant

Frank O'Grady CBE

Director-General of the Postmaster-General's Department
- In office 28 September 1961 – 8 December 1965

Personal details
- Born: Francis Phillip O’Grady; 9 October 1900 Thebarton, Adelaide, South Australia
- Died: 6 May 1981 (aged 80) Woodville, Adelaide, South Australia
- Spouse: Dorothy Mary Walsh (m. 1930)
- Occupation: Public servant

Francis Phillip "Frank" O’Grady CBE (9 October 1900 – 6 May 1981) was a senior Australia public servant. He was Director-General of the Postmaster-General's Department from September 1961 until December 1965.

== Life and career ==
Frank O'Grady was born on 9 October 1900 in Thebarton, Adelaide the first child of Hannah and John Michael O'Grady.

He was appointed Director-General of Posts and Telegraphs, heading the Postmaster-General's Department, in September 1961.

O'Grady retired from the Commonwealth Public Service and his position at the Postmaster-General's Department in December 1965.

== Awards ==
In 1964 O'Grady was appointed a Commander of the Order of the British Empire. He was appointed a knight commander of the papal Order of St Gregory the Great in 1969.

Government offices
| Preceded by Mervyn Stradwick | Director General of the Postmaster-General's Department; 1961 – 1965 | Succeeded by Trevor Housley |
