= Harry Brown (public servant) =

Australian public servant

Sir Harry Brown CMG MBE

Director-General of the Postmaster-General's Department
- In office 18 December 1923 – 31 December 1939

Personal details
- Born: Harry Percy Brown; 28 December 1878 Hylton, Durham, England
- Died: 5 June 1967 (aged 88) Sydney, New South Wales, Australia
- Occupation: Public servant

Sir Harry Percy Brown CMG MBE (28 December 1878 – 5 June 1967) was a senior Australia public servant. He was Director-General of the Postmaster-General's Department from 1923 until 1939.

== Life and career ==
Harry Brown was born in South Hylton, County Durham, England on 28 December 1878 to Sarah Emma and George Brown.

He was appointed Director-General of Posts and Telegraphs, heading the Postmaster-General's Department, in December 1923. His salary on appointment was significantly more than that of any other person in the Commonwealth Public Service.

On 5 June 1967, Brown died in Sydney.

== Awards ==
Brown was appointed a Member of the Order of the British Empire in 1918, a Companion of the Order of St Michael and St George in 1934, and was knighted in 1938.

Government offices
Preceded by Justinian Oxenham	Director General of the Postmaster-General's Department; 1923 – 1939	Succeeded by Daniel McVey
