= Department of Shipping and Fuel =

Australian government department, 1948–1950

Agency overview
- Formed: 6 April 1948
- Preceding agency: Department of Supply and Shipping
- Dissolved: 16 March 1950
- Superseding agency: Department of Fuel, Shipping and Transport – for shipping and fuel functions Department of Labour and National Service – for industrial relations
- Jurisdiction: Commonwealth of Australia
- Ministers responsible: George McLeay, Minister (1949–1950); Bill Ashley, Minister (1948–1949)
- Agency executives: George Sutcliffe, Secretary (1948); Charles Hector McFadyen, Secretary (1948–1950)

The Department of Shipping and Fuel was an Australian government department that existed between April 1948 and March 1950.

== Scope ==
Information about the department's functions and government funding allocation could be found in the Administrative Arrangements Orders, the annual Portfolio Budget Statements and in the department's annual reports.

According to the Administrative Arrangements Order made on 13 May 1948, the department dealt with:

- Commonwealth Oil Refineries Ltd (Government relations with)
- Coal production and distribution
- Importation, sale and use of liquid fuels and petroleum products, including rationing and distribution of petroleum fuels and substitute and synthetic fuels
- Mining and distribution of coal
- Mining and distribution of oil shale and refining of shale oil products
- Oil wells. Refining and distribution of locally produced petroleum products
- Control and maintenance of coastal lights and other aids to navigation on the ocean highways of the Australian coastline.
- Control of navigation services such as seamen's compensation, prevention of obstruction on shipping routes and fishing grounds, accommodation for ships' crews, welfare of seamen, maintenance of ships' gear, examination of masters and officers, Courts of Marine Inquiry
- Shipping, including the best utilization of the Australian Coastal Fleet, the chartering of ships, the manning of ships
- Stevedoring labor and operations, delivery of carto to and from ships, including wharf clearance and storage of cargo
- Stowage and movement of explosives and dangerous cargoes at Australian ports
- Policy in respect of shipbuilding and subsidy to promote the operation of Australian-built ships
- Commonwealth Handling Equipment Pool

== Structure ==
The department was an Australian Public Service department, staffed by officials who were responsible to the Minister for Shipping and Fuel, initially Bill Ashley and, after the 1949 federal election, George McLeay.
