= Pat Lanigan =

Australian public servant and administrator

Pat Lanigan OBE

Secretary of the Department of Social Security
- In office 19 August 1977 – 23 April 1981

Personal details
- Born: Patrick Joseph Lanigan; 20 February 1925 North Fitzroy, Victoria
- Died: 1992 (aged 67) Turkey
- Spouse: Margaret
- Children: 4
- Education: University of Melbourne; Australian National University
- Occupation: Public servant

Patrick Joseph "Pat" Lanigan OBE (1925 – 1992) was a senior Australian public servant and administrator.

== Life and career ==
Pat Lanigan was born on 20 February 1925 in North Fitzroy, Victoria, the son of a Victorian Railways worker. He was raised in Hampton, Victoria, attending the St Kilda Christian Brothers College and later the University of Melbourne.

Between September 1943 and December 1946, during World War II, Lanigan served in the 2/5th Battalion, Australian Imperial Force, in New Guinea.

Lanigan joined the Australian Public Service in the Australian Taxation Office in 1950 when he was 25 years of age.

In 1958, on 24 April, he married Margaret Cynthia Lanigan and they had four children and three grandchildren.

Between 1977 and 1981 Lanigan was Secretary of the Department of Social Security. During his time at the head of the department he made control of benefits abuses a high priority. Lanigan was managing the department when he heard allegations that eight medical practitioners and at least 500 persons of Greek background were involved in rorts costing the department revenue of between $2.5 million and $5 million per year. In response the department conducted controversial and disastrous dragnet raids, and Lanigan's career suffered due to the scandal.

Lanigan died of a heart-attack in Turkey in 1992, aged 67.

== Awards ==
Lanigan was made an Officer of the Order of the British Empire in June 1976 for his public service.

Government offices
Preceded by Laurie Daniels	Secretary of the Department of Social Security; 1977 – 1981	Succeeded by Tony Ayers
