= Roger Beale =

Australian public servant and artist

Roger Beale AO

Secretary of the Department of the Environment and Heritage
- In office 21 October 1998 – 2004

Secretary of the Department of the Environment
- In office 9 October 1997 – 21 October 1998

Secretary of the Department of the Environment, Sport and Territories
- In office 11 March 1996 – 9 October 1997

Personal details
- Born: Roger David Bernard Beale; 18 December 1946 (age 79) India
- Spouse: Venetia
- Education: Cornell University; University of Queensland
- Occupation: Public servant, artist
- Website: http://www.rogerbeale.com.au/

Roger David Bernard Beale AO (born 18 December 1946) is a former senior Australian public servant and policymaker. Since retiring from the public service, Beale has continued to pursue work as an artist, having held exhibitions in galleries around Canberra since 1984.

== Background and early life ==
Roger Beale was born on 18 December 1946 in Bombay, India. Beale and his parents emigrated to Australia from India in the 1950s, so he could receive better treatment for the polio he had contracted at age two.

Beale studied arts, training in Queensland with teachers including Betty Churcher and Jon Molvig. He also attained a Bachelor of Arts in History and Law from the University of Queensland and a Master of Industrial and Labor Relations from Cornell University.

== Career ==
Beale first joined the Australian Public Service in 1967 as an administrative trainee.

Beale was appointed Secretary of the Department of the Environment, Sport and Territories in 1996 and remained head of the department when it was transitioned to Department of the Environment and later Department of the Environment and Heritage.

In 2004, Beale retired from the Australian Public Service after 37 years of service. Since retirement, Beale has continued his work as an artist, having held exhibitions in galleries around Canberra since 1984. His major themes include life studies, art history, landscapes and the sublime. He also chaired a review of Australia's Quarantine and Biosecurity Arrangements, in 2008, and went on to become a Commissioner of the Climate Commission when it was established in 2011.

== Awards ==
Beale was made a Member of the Order of Australia for contribution to national economic reform in 1995 and an Officer of the Order in 2006.

Government offices
Preceded by Stuart Hamilton	Secretary of the Department of the Environment, Sport and Territories; 1996–1997	Succeeded by Himself as Secretary of the Department of the Environment
Preceded by Himself as Secretary of the Department of the Environment, Sport and Territories	Secretary of the Department of the Environment; 1997–1998	Succeeded by Himself as Secretary of the Department of the Environment and Heritage
Preceded by Himself as Secretary of the Department of the Environment	Secretary of the Department of the Environment and Heritage; 1998–2004	Succeeded by David Borthwick
