= Louis Wienholt =

Australian public servant

Secretary of the Department of Social Security
- In office 9 January 1973 – 26 July 1973

Personal details
- Born: Louis John Wienholt; 1918
- Died: 1973 (aged 54–55)
- Spouse: Hilda Hamilton (m. 1946; died 1949)
- Occupation: Public servant

Louis John Wienholt (1918–1973) was a senior Australian public servant, including as Secretary of the Department of Social Security in 1973.

== Life and career ==
Wienholt was born in 1918. He was a Queenslander who went into practice with his wife, Hilda Wienholt, in Red Hill, Queensland. Hilda died suddenly on 14 September 1944; the couple had a child aged 11 months at the time of Hilda's death. The doctors who performed Hilda's autopsy were unable to determine the cause of her death.

Wienholt began his Australian Public Service career in 1950. He was promoted to Senior Medical Officer, grade 2, third division in 1957.

Between 1968 and 1973 he was a Deputy Director-General at the Department of Health. In January 1973 he was appointed Director-General of the Department of Social Security. During his time as head of social security, Wienholt organized for his desk clerks to attend two-week courses in the slums of Melbourne and Sydney to "sensitise" them to the problems of departmental clients.

Wienholt retired due to ill health early into his term at the Department of Social Security, he had suffered a heart attack in April 1973. He died later that year.

Government offices
Preceded by Bruce Hamilton	Secretary of the Department of Social Security; 1973	Succeeded by Laurie Daniels
