= Bede Fanning =

Australian public servant

Bede Fanning ISO

Director-General of the Postmaster-General's Department
- In office 11 June 1946 – 14 March 1949

Personal details
- Born: Lawrence Bede Fanning; 18 August 1885 Casino, New South Wales
- Died: 14 August 1970 (aged 84) Hawthorn, Melbourne, Victoria
- Resting place: Melbourne general cemetery
- Spouse(s): Amy Edwards (m. 1910–1951; her death)
- Occupation: Public servant

Lawrence Bede Fanning ISO (18 August 1885 – 14 August 1970) was a senior Australian public servant, best known for his time as Director-General of the Postmaster-General's Department in the 1940s.

== Life and career ==
Bede Fanning was born in Casino, New South Wales on 18 August 1885.

During World War II, while the Director-General of the Postmaster-General's Department at the time, Daniel McVey, was engaged on work for the Department of Civil Aviation and Aircraft production, Fanning was head of the Australian Post Office.

In June 1946, Fanning was appointed Director-General of the Postmaster-General's Department. He retired from his position at the Department in March 1949 and the day after his retirement began a three-year term as Chairman of the Australian Broadcasting Control Board, tasked with supervising the provision of radio and television services and maintaining technical and programming standards.

Fanning died on 14 August 1970 in Hawthorn, Melbourne.

== Awards ==
Fanning was awarded an Imperial Service Order in June 1941 as the Chief Telephone Inspector in the Postmaster-General's Department.

Government offices
Preceded by Daniel McVey	Director-General of the Postmaster-General's Department; 1946 – 1949	Succeeded by Giles Chippindall
