= Giles Chippindall =

Australian public servant

Sir Giles Chippindall CBE

Secretary of the Department of Supply and Shipping
- In office 11 April 1945 – 5 September 1946

Director-General of the Postmaster-General's Department
- In office 15 March 1949 – 20 May 1958

Personal details
- Born: Giles Tatlock Chippindall; 21 May 1893 Carlton, Melbourne, Victoria
- Died: 20 December 1969 (aged 76) East Melbourne, Victoria
- Spouse(s): Grace Elizabeth Bayley (m. 1918–1969; his death)
- Education: University of Sydney
- Occupation: Public servant

Sir Giles Tatlock Chippindall CBE (21 May 1893 – 20 December 1969) was a senior Australian public servant. He was Secretary of the Department of Supply and Shipping between 1945 and 1946 and Director-General of the Postmaster-General's Department between 1949 and 1958.

== Life and career ==
Giles Chippindall was born in Carlton, Melbourne on 21 May 1893. He was educated at state schools in Victoria and Prahran College.

Chippindall joined the Australian Public Service in 1908 as a telegraph messenger in the Postmaster-General's Department.

During World War II, he served in a multitude of roles to progress the war-effort, including as Secretary of the Department of Supply and Shipping between 1945 and 1946.

He was appointed Director-General of the Postmaster General's Department in 1949, serving in the role until his retirement in May 1958. In retirement he was Chairman of the Overseas Telecommunications Commission (1961–62) and Australian National Airlines Commission (1959-66).

== Awards and honours ==
Chippindall was made a Commander of the Order of the British Empire in June 1950 while Director-General of Posts and Telegraphs in Western Australia. In January 1955, he was honoured as a Knight Bachelor.

His portrait, painted by Lucy Lee, was an Archibald Prize finalist in 1955.

In 1987, a street in the Canberra suburb of Theodore was named Chippindall Circuit in Giles Chippindall's honour.

Government offices
Preceded by Arthur Smith	Secretary of the Department of Supply and Shipping; 1945 – 1946	Succeeded by Frank O'Connor
Preceded by Bede Fanning	Director-General of the Postmaster-General's Department; 1949 – 1958	Succeeded by Van Vanthoff
