= Herbert Goodes =

Australian public servant

Herbert Goodes CBE

Secretary of the Department of Social Services
- In office 25 May 1958 – 31 December 1965

Personal details
- Born: Herbert John Goodes England
- Died: 12 July 1986
- Spouse(s): Joyce Nancy Goodes (m. 1939–1986; his death)
- Children: Jayne and Dinah
- Education: University of Western Australia
- Occupation: Public servant

Herbert John Goodes CBE was a senior Australian public servant and policymaker.

== Life and career ==
Goodes was born in England, migrating to Australia in the 1920s and reaching Western Australia where he took on casual work, including digging dams and fencing. In the 1930s, Goodes enrolled to study part-time at the University of Western Australia, graduating with honours in economics.

In 1939, Goodes married Joyce and together they moved to Canberra in 1943 when he was seconded to the Department of the Treasury from the WA Registry of Births, Deaths and Marriages.

Between 1958 and 1965, Goodes was the Secretary of the Department of Social Services. Upon his retirement from the Social Services Department, Goodes was appointed a member of the Commonwealth Grants Commission.

Goodes died on 12 July 1986.

== Awards ==
Goodes was made a Commander of the Order of the British Empire in January 1960, for his service as Director-General of the Department of Social Services.

Government offices
Preceded by Frank Rowe	Secretary of the Department of Social Services; 1958 – 1965	Succeeded by Bruce Hamilton
