= Department of Fuel, Shipping and Transport =

Australian government department, 1950–1951

Department overview
- Formed: 16 March 1950
- Preceding Department: Department of Shipping and Fuel Department of Supply and Development (II) – for coal production Department of Transport (II)
- Dissolved: 11 May 1951
- Superseding Department: Department of National Development (I) – for fuel Department of Shipping and Transport – for shipping and transport
- Jurisdiction: Commonwealth of Australia
- Minister responsible: George McLeay, Minister for Fuel, Shipping and Transport
- Department executive: Charles Hector McFadyen, Secretary

The Department of Fuel, Shipping and Transport was an Australian government department that existed between March 1950 and May 1951.

== Scope ==
Information about the department's functions and government funding allocation could be found in the Administrative Arrangements Orders, the annual Portfolio Budget Statements and in the department's annual reports.

According to the Administrative Arrangements Order made on 17 March 1950, the department dealt with:

- Commonwealth Oil Refineries Ltd (Government relations with)
- Coal production and distribution
- Importation, sale and use of liquid fuels and petroleum products, including rationing and distribution of petroleum fuels and substitute and synthetic fuels
- Mining and distribution of coal
- Mining and distribution of oil shale and refining of shale oil products
- Oil wells. Refining and distribution of locally produced petroleum products
- Control and maintenance of coastal lights and other aids to navigation on the ocean highways of the Australian coastline.
- Control of navigation services such as seamen's compensation, prevention of obstruction on shipping routes and fishing grounds, accommodation for ships' crews, welfare of seamen, maintenance of ships' gear, examination of masters and officers, Courts of Marine Inquiry
- Shipping, including the best utilization of the Australian Coastal Fleet, the chartering of ships, the manning of ships
- Stowage and movement of explosives and dangerous cargoes at Australian ports
- Policy in respect of shipbuilding and subsidy to promote the operation of Australian-built ships
- Commonwealth Handling Equipment Pool
- Railways, Commonwealth
- Administration of Standardization of Railways Agreement
- Australian Transport Advisory Council

== Structure ==
The department was an Australian Public Service department, staffed by officials who were responsible to the Minister for Fuel, Shipping and Transport, George McLeay The department's secretary was C.H. McFayden.
