= Department of the Environment (1997–1998) =

Australian government department, 1997–1998

Department overview
- Formed: 9 October 1997
- Preceding Department: Department of the Environment, Sport and Territories
- Dissolved: 21 October 1998
- Superseding Department: Department of the Environment and Heritage
- Jurisdiction: Commonwealth of Australia
- Headquarters: Canberra
- Minister responsible: Robert Hill, Minister
- Department executive: Roger Beale, Secretary

The Department of the Environment was an Australian government department that existed between October 1997 and October 1998. It was the second so-named Australian government department.

== Scope ==
Information about the department's functions and government funding allocation could be found in the Administrative Arrangements Orders, the annual Portfolio Budget Statements, in the Department's annual reports and on the Department's website.

At its creation, the Department was responsible for:

- Environment and conservation
- Meteorology
- Administration of the Australian Antarctic Territory, and the Territory of Heard Island and McDonald Islands

== Structure ==
The Department was an Australian Public Service department, staffed by officials who were responsible to the Minister for the Environment, Robert Hill.
