= Don Grimes =

Australian politician (1937–2021)

The Honourable Don Grimes AO
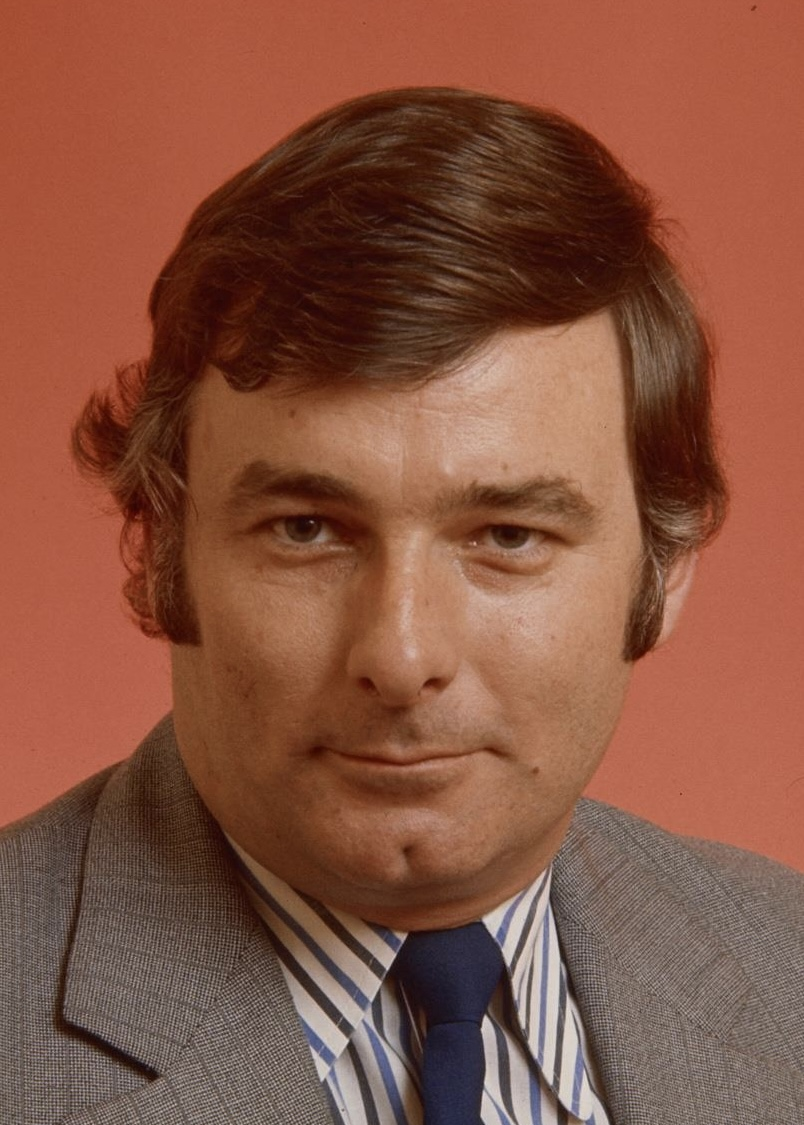

Minister for Community Services
- In office 13 December 1984 – 16 February 1987
- Prime Minister: Bob Hawke
- Preceded by: New title
- Succeeded by: Chris Hurford

Minister for Social Security
- In office 11 March 1983 – 13 December 1984
- Prime Minister: Bob Hawke
- Preceded by: Fred Chaney
- Succeeded by: Brian Howe

Senator for Tasmania
- In office 18 May 1974 – 2 April 1987

Personal details
- Born: 4 October 1937 Albury, New South Wales, Australia
- Died: 20 November 2021 (aged 84)
- Party: Labor
- Occupation: General practitioner

Donald James Grimes AO (4 October 1937 – 20 November 2021) was an Australian politician who served as a Senator for Tasmania from 1974 to 1987, representing the Australian Labor Party (ALP). In the Hawke government he held ministerial office as Minister for Social Security (1983–1984) and Minister for Community Services (1984–1987). He was a general practitioner before entering politics.

== Early life ==
Grimes was born on 4 October 1937 in Albury, New South Wales. He was the older of two children born to Nancy (née O'Neill) and Walter Grimes; his father worked as a fitter and turner with New South Wales Railways. He was educated at Albury High School for three years, but after his mother's death from bowel cancer he and his sister were sent to live with an aunt in Sydney. Grimes completed his education at Fort Street High School and went on to study medicine at the University of Sydney (MBBS 1962). He excelled at sport, playing inter-school rugby union for Fort Street, junior rugby league for North Sydney, and Australian football for Sydney University.

== Medical career ==
Grimes married Margaret Schofield in 1960, with whom he had four children. He completed his clinical training at Royal North Shore Hospital and his internship at Royal Hobart Hospital in Tasmania, subsequently accepting locum positions in Hobart, New Norfolk and Launceston. From 1965 to 1966 he lived in London and was the in-house doctor for Beaverbrook Newspapers. After returning to Australia he served as district medical officer at Cygnet and then opened a general practice in the Launceston suburb of Riverside.

== Politics ==
Grimes joined the Australian Labor Party in 1968, after previously joining the British Labour Party during his time in England.

Grimes was elected to the Senate at the 1974 federal election, taking office immediately due to the preceding double dissolution. In 1976, he was elected to Gough Whitlam's shadow cabinet with the sixth-highest number of votes. He was given the social security portfolio. In March 1980, Grimes was suspended from parliament for 24 hours for using the words "pimp" and "fascist" and accusing Prime Minister Malcolm Fraser of "setting up" a demonstration outside a nursing home at which nine people were arrested.

After the ALP won the 1983 election, Grimes was appointed Minister for Social Security in the Hawke government. He was also elected Deputy Leader of the Government in the Senate. In a cabinet reshuffle in 1984 he was given the new position of Minister for Community Services. Grimes underwent a triple bypass operation in June 1985 and returned to work in August.

In October 1986, Grimes announced that he would not seek re-election. He resigned from Parliament in April 1987, but the casual vacancy was not immediately filled because the Tasmanian Parliament stalemated over the appointment of the Labor Party's nominee as replacement senator, John Devereux.

== Later life ==
Between 1987 and 1991, Grimes was Australian Ambassador to the Netherlands. He was appointed an Officer of the Order of Australia in January 1992. In May 1992, he was announced as the chairman of the Australian National Council on AIDS. He was Chairman of South Eastern Sydney and Illawarra Area Health Service from September 1995 to February 2004.

Grimes died on 20 November 2021 at the age of 84.

== Notes ==
Political offices
Preceded by Fred Chaney	Minister for Social Security; 1983–1984	Succeeded by Brian Howe
Preceded by New title	Minister for Community Services; 1984–1987	Succeeded by Chris Hurford
Diplomatic posts
Preceded by Geoffrey Price	Australian Ambassador to the Netherlands; 1987–1991	Succeeded by Warwick Weemaes
