= Department of Social Services (1939–1972) =

Australian government department, 1939–1972

Department overview
- Formed: 26 April 1939
- Dissolved: 19 December 1972
- Superseding Department: Department of Social Security
- Jurisdiction: Commonwealth of Australia
- Headquarters: Canberra
- Department executives: Jim Brigden, Secretary (1939–1941); Frank Rowe, Secretary (1941–1958); Herbert Goodes, Secretary (1958–1965); Bruce Hamilton, Secretary (1966–1972)

The Department of Social Services was an Australian government department that existed between April 1939 and December 1972.

The Department was established by the Menzies Government in 1939, but did not become fully operative until 1941.

== Scope ==
Information about the department's functions and government funding allocation could be found in the Administrative Arrangements Orders, the annual Portfolio Budget Statements and in the Department's annual reports.

According to the Administrative Arrangements Order of 12 March 1947, the department was responsible for:

- Allowances for wives and children of invalid pensioners
- Child endowment
- Compassionate allowances to persons ineligible for invalid, old-age and widows' pensions and maternity allowances
- Compensation or pensions to, or in respect of, ex-members of the Civil Constructional Corps, ex-civil defence workers, and civilians who suffered war injury
- Reception and aftercare of evacuees and ex-internees
- Funeral benefit for invalid and old-age pensioners
- Maternity allowances
- Old-age pensions
- Payment of:
  - Commonwealth Literary Fund allowances
  - Financial assistance to university students
  - Imperial pensions (other than war pensions)
  - Judiciary pensions
  - Pensions and retiring allowances under Section 84 of the Commonwealth Constitution
  - Special annuities granted by the Commonwealth
  - Superannuation to retired Commonwealth employees
  - Reciprocity with New Zealand in relation to invalid and old-age benefits
- Rehabilitation of ex-members of the Forces
- Rehabilitation of invalid pensioners
- Sickness benefits
- Social service proposals and activities generally
- Unemployment benefits
- Vocational training of invalid pensioners and unemployment and sickness beneficiaries
- Widow's pensions

== Structure ==
The Department was an Australian Public Service department, staffed by officials who were responsible to the Minister for Social Services.
