= Department of Community Services and Health =

Former Australian government department, 1987–1991

Department overview
- Formed: 24 July 1987
- Preceding Department: Department of Health (I); Department of Community Services
- Dissolved: 7 June 1991
- Superseding Department: Department of Health, Housing and Community Services
- Jurisdiction: Commonwealth of Australia
- Headquarters: Phillip, Canberra
- Ministers responsible: Neal Blewett, Minister (1987–1990); Brian Howe, Minister (1990–1991)
- Department executives: Tony Ayers, Secretary (1987–1988); Stuart Hamilton, Secretary (1988–1991)

The Department of Community Services and Health was an Australian government department that existed between July 1987 and June 1991.

== History ==
The Department of Community Services and Health was one of 16 "super-ministries" announced as part of a major restructuring of the administration and economy by Prime Minister Bob Hawke in July 1987. The department was an amalgamation of the Department of Community Services and the Department of Health.

== Scope ==
Information about the department's functions and government funding allocation could be found in the Administrative Arrangements Orders, the annual Portfolio Budget Statements and in the department's annual reports.

At its creation, the department was responsible for:

- Services for the aged, people with disabilities and families with children
- Community support services
- Housing assistance
- Public health, research and preventive medicine
- Community health projects
- Health promotion
- Pharmaceutical benefits
- Health benefits schemes
- Human quarantine
- National drug abuse strategy

== Structure ==
The department was an Australian Public Service department, staffed by officials who were responsible to the Minister for Community Services and Health, first Neal Blewett (until April 1990) and then Brian Howe.

The Secretary of the department was initially Tony Ayers (until July 1988) and then Stuart Hamilton.
