= Dudley Williams (public servant) =

Australian public servant

Dudley Williams CBE

Secretary of the Department of Shipping and Transport
- In office 29 October 1957 – 8 April 1969

Personal details
- Born: Dudley Cadell Leslie Williams; 1909
- Died: 18 March 1985 (aged 75–76) East Melbourne
- Occupation: Public servant

Dudley Cadell Leslie Williams CBE (1909 – 18 March 1985) was a former senior Australian public servant. He was Secretary of the Department of Shipping and Transport between 1957 and 1969.

== Life and career ==
Dudley Williams was born in 1909. He attended Wesley College and Queen's College.

Williams joined a predecessor to the Department of Shipping and Transport in 1943. He was appointed deputy chairman of the Australian Ship-building Board in 1952, and Secretary of the Department of Shipping and Transport in October 1957. He retired from the Commonwealth Public Service in 1969.

Williams married Miss Margaret Crofton "Peg" Harper in Adelaide on Melbourne Cup day in 1966. He had worked with her for nearly 20 years ahead of their engagement. She had been private secretary to three ministers for shipping and transport.

Williams died on 18 March 1985 at the Mercy Private Hospital in East Melbourne.

== Awards ==
Williams was made a Commander of the Order of the British Empire in June 1961.

Government offices
| Preceded by Charles Hector McFadyen | Secretary of the Department of Shipping and Transport; 1957 – 1969 | Succeeded by Malcolm Macgregor Summers |
