= Daniel McVey =

Australian public servant

Sir Daniel McVey CMG
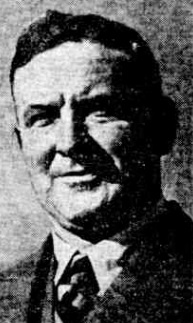

Director-General of the Department of Supply and Development
- In office 25 May 1939 – 29 August 1939

Director-General of the Postmaster-General's Department
- In office 1 January 1940 – 10 June 1946

Director-General of the Department of Civil Aviation
- In office 17 February 1944 – 10 June 1946

Personal details
- Born: Daniel McVey; 24 November 1892 Carronshore, Stirlingshire, Scotland
- Died: 24 December 1972 (aged 80) East Melbourne, Victoria, Australia
- Spouse: Margaret Gardiner (Peggy)
- Children: 3
- Education: Falkirk High School
- Occupation: Public servant

Sir Daniel McVey CMG (24 November 1892 – 24 December 1972) was a senior Australian public servant. He was Director-General of the Postmaster-General's Department from 1940 until December 1946.

== Life and career ==
Daniel McVey was born in Carronshore, Stirlingshire, Scotland, on 24 November 1892, to Daniel and Jeanie McVey. He and his younger brothers Robert (Bob), Harry (Henry), George, Bill and sister Nessie moved to Australia in 1910 after their mother Jeanie died in childbirth and their father remarried.

McVey joined the Commonwealth Public Service in the Postmaster-General's Department as a clerk in 1914. He left the department to serve with the First Australian Imperial Force between 1915 and 1919 in the 45th Battery, attaining the position Lieutenant.

He was appointed Director-General of Posts and Telegraphs, heading the Postmaster-General's Department, in January 1940. From February 1944, McVey had also held the post of Director-General of Civil Aviation, head of the Department of Civil Aviation, a position he was officially "on loan" to.

McVey retired from the public service in June 1946. After leaving the service, he joined private industry, working as chairman and managing director of Standard Telephones & Cables Pty Ltd between 1946 and 1949, and then going on to become managing director of Metal Manufactures Ltd and Austral Bronze Co. Pty Ltd from 1949 until 1962.

McVey died on 24 December 1972 in East Melbourne and was cremated.

== Awards ==
In 1946, McVey was awarded the University of Melbourne Kernot Memorial Medal, for distinguished engineering achievement.

McVey was appointed a Companion of the Order of St Michael and St George in 1950.

Government offices
Preceded by Joseph Carrodus as Secretary of the Department of the Interior	Secretary of the Department of Supply and Development; 1939	Succeeded by Jim Brigden
Preceded by Harry Brown	Director General of the Postmaster-General's Department; 1940 – 1946	Succeeded by Bede Fanning
Preceded by Arthur Corbett	Director General of the Department of Civil Aviation; 1944 – 1946	Succeeded by Richard Williams
