= Malcolm Macgregor Summers =

Australian public servant

Malcolm Macgregor Summers CBE

Secretary of the Department of Transport
- In office 1973–1973

Secretary of the Department of Shipping and Transport
- In office 1969–1972

Personal details
- Born: Malcolm Macgregor Summers; 1924 Queensland
- Died: September 1987 (aged 62)
- Spouse: Betty (d. 1972)
- Children: Kim, Nick and Catriona
- Occupation: Public servant

Malcolm Macgregor Summers CBE (1924 – September 1987) was a senior Australian public servant. He is best known for his time as Secretary of the Department of Shipping and Transport from 1969 to 1972.

== Life and career ==
Summers was born in Queensland in 1925. He joined the Commonwealth Public Service in 1941 and moved to Canberra in the early 1950s to work for the Burueau of Census and Statistics.

In March 1969, Summers was appointed Secretary of the Department of Shipping and Transport, a promotion from his position as deputy secretary of the Department of Trade and Industry. In the role, he worked to set up the Bureau of Transport Economics and brought in new funding arrangements for national highways, rail, urban transport, shipping and road safety. The department's involvement in policy issues increased substantially during the time that Summers was its secretary.

In December 1972, the department was reformed as the Department of Transport. Summers was Secretary until late 1973 when then Prime Minister Gough Whitlam announced he was to become the sole Commissioner of a Commonwealth Inquiry into the maritime industry.

Summers retired in 1976 due to ill health.

He died in 1987. His wife Betty had died in 1972.

== Awards ==
Summers was made a Commander of the Order of the British Empire in June 1976 for his public service.

Government offices
Preceded by Dudley Williams	Secretary of the Department of Shipping and Transport; 1969 – 1972	Succeeded by Himself as Secretary of the Department of Transport
Preceded by Himself as Secretary of the Department of Shipping and Transport	Secretary of the Department of Transport; 1973	Succeeded by Charles Halton
