= Department of Health, Housing and Community Services =

Former Australian government department, 1991–1993

Department overview
- Formed: 7 June 1991
- Preceding Department: Department of Community Services and Health; Department of Industry, Technology and Commerce
- Dissolved: 24 March 1993
- Superseding Department: Department of Health, Housing, Local Government and Community Services
- Jurisdiction: Commonwealth of Australia
- Headquarters: Phillip, Canberra
- Minister responsible: Brian Howe, Minister
- Department executive: Stuart Hamilton, Secretary

The Department of Health, Housing and Community Services was an Australian government department that existed between June 1991 and March 1993.

== Scope ==
Information about the department's functions and government funding allocation could be found in the Administrative Arrangements Orders, the annual Portfolio Budget Statements and in the department's annual reports.

At its creation, the department was responsible for:

- Services for the aged, people with disabilities and families with children
- Community support services
- Housing
- Public health, research and preventive medicine
- Community health projects
- Health promotion
- Pharmaceutical benefits
- Health benefits schemes
- Human quarantine
- National drug abuse strategy

== Structure ==
The department was an Australian Public Service department, staffed by officials who were responsible to the Minister for Health, Housing and Community Services, Brian Howe.

The secretary of the department was S.A. Hamilton.
