= Department of Supply and Development (1948–1950) =

Australian Government department, 1948–1950

Department overview
- Formed: 6 April 1948
- Preceding Department: Department of Munitions Department of Supply and Shipping – for supply, disposal of Commonwealth property, minerals, oil prospecting
- Dissolved: 16 March 1950
- Superseding Department: Department of Fuel, Shipping and Transport – for coal production Department of National Development (I) – for mineral resources, geology and geophysics Department of Supply – for Australian Aluminium Production Commission
- Jurisdiction: Commonwealth of Australia
- Ministers responsible: John Armstrong, Minister (1948–1949); Richard Casey, Minister (1949–1950)
- Department executives: John Jensen, Secretary (1948–1949); Harold Breen, Secretary (1949–1950)

The Department of Supply and Development was an Australian government department that existed between April 1948 and March 1950.

== Scope ==
Information about the department's functions and government funding allocation could be found in the Administrative Arrangements Orders, the annual Portfolio Budget Statements and in the department's annual reports.

The department was set up by the Chifley government to control services that were deemed essential to supporting Australia's armed forces. Its creation saw the rearrangement of the Department of Munitions and the Department of Supply and Shipping. The functions of the department included:

- research, design and development in relation to war material
- the provision or supply of war materiel
- the manufacture or assembly of aircraft or parts thereof
- arrangements for the establishment or extension of industries for purposes of defence
- the acquisition, maintenance and disposal of stocks of goods in connection with defence; and
- the arrangement or co-ordination of:
  - surveys, of Australian industrial capacity and the preparation of plans to ensure the effective operation of industry in time of war, including plans for the decentralization of secondary industries and particularly those relating to defence; and
  - the investigation and development of Australian sources of supply of goods necessary for the economic security of the Commonwealth in time of war, and, in particular, the investigation and development of additional oil and strategic mineral resources, the production of power alcohol from sugar or other vegetable crops, and the production of oil from coal or shale.

== Structure ==
The department was a Commonwealth Public Service department, staffed by officials who were responsible to the Minister for Supply and Development, initially John Armstrong (until Labor's defeat at the 1949 election) and subsequently Richard Casey.

== Abolition ==
The department was abolished by the Menzies Government in 1950 in a reorganisation planned by Richard Casey.
