= Department of Supply and Shipping =

Australian government department, 1942–1948

Department overview
- Formed: 17 October 1942
- Preceding Department: Department of Supply and Development (I)
- Dissolved: 6 April 1948
- Superseding Department: Department of Shipping and Fuel – for shipping and fuel Department of Supply and Development (II) – for supply, disposal of Commonwealth property, minerals, oil prospecting Department of Commerce and Agriculture – for jute and flax production
- Jurisdiction: Commonwealth of Australia
- Ministers responsible: Jack Beasley, Minister for Supply and Shipping (1942–1945); Bill Ashley, Minister for Supply and Shipping (1945–1948)
- Department executives: Arthur Smith, Secretary (1942–1945); Giles Chippindall, Secretary (1945–1946); Frank O'Connor, Secretary (1946–1948)

The Department of Supply and Shipping was an Australian government department that existed between October 1942 and April 1948.

== Scope ==
Information about the department's functions and government funding allocation could be found in the Administrative Arrangements Orders, the annual Portfolio Budget Statements and in the Department's annual reports.

The functions of the Department (in 1946) were:

- The procurement of all supplies for the Services (other than arms, ammunition, ships and aircraft), and of certain other items for Commonwealth departments and overseas authorities
- The control of shipping, including:
  - The best utilization of the Australian coastal fleet
  - The operation of Government-owned and chartered ships
  - Stevedoring labour and waterfront operations
  - The control of navigation service
  - The control and maintenance of coastal lights and aids to navigation
  - The operation of the Commonwealth Handling Equipment Pool
- The control of coal production and distribution
- The disposal of certain classes of Commonwealth property
- Oversight of the production of strategic minerals, metals and concentrates, the investigation and development of mineral resources, the conduct of geological and geophysical surveys, the search for oil and natural gas, and the development of Australia's fuel resources
- The control of the importation, allocation and use of various items in continuing world short supply, tinplate, petroleum, jute and jute goods, and cordage and fibre
- The production of flax in Australia
- The control of Commonwealth Clothing Factory

== Structure ==
The Department was an Australian Public Service department, staffed by officials who were responsible to the Minister for Supply and Shipping, initially Jack Beasley (until February 1945) and subsequently Bill Ashley.
