= Department of Social Security (Australia) =

Former Australian government department (1972–1998)

Department overview
- Formed: 19 December 1972
- Preceding Department: Department of Health (I) – for health and hospital benefits schemes Department of Social Services (I) – for all other functions
- Dissolved: 21 October 1998
- Superseding Department: Department of Family and Community Services
- Jurisdiction: Commonwealth of Australia
- Headquarters: Canberra
- Employees: 11,494 (in 1981)
- Annual budget: $7.7 billion per year (estimate in 1981)
- Department executives: Bruce Hamilton, Secretary (1972–1973); Louis Wienholt, Secretary (1973); Laurie Daniels, Secretary (1973–1977); Pat Lanigan, Secretary (1977–1981); Tony Ayers, Secretary (1981–1986); Derek Volker, Secretary (1986–1993); Tony Blunn, Secretary (1993–1998); David Rosalky, Secretary (1998)
- Website: dss.gov.au

The Department of Social Security (the DSS) was a government department in Australia, which administered the Social Security system between 1972 and 1998. The department was one of several new departments established by the Whitlam government and was managed by the Minister for Social Security.

== History ==
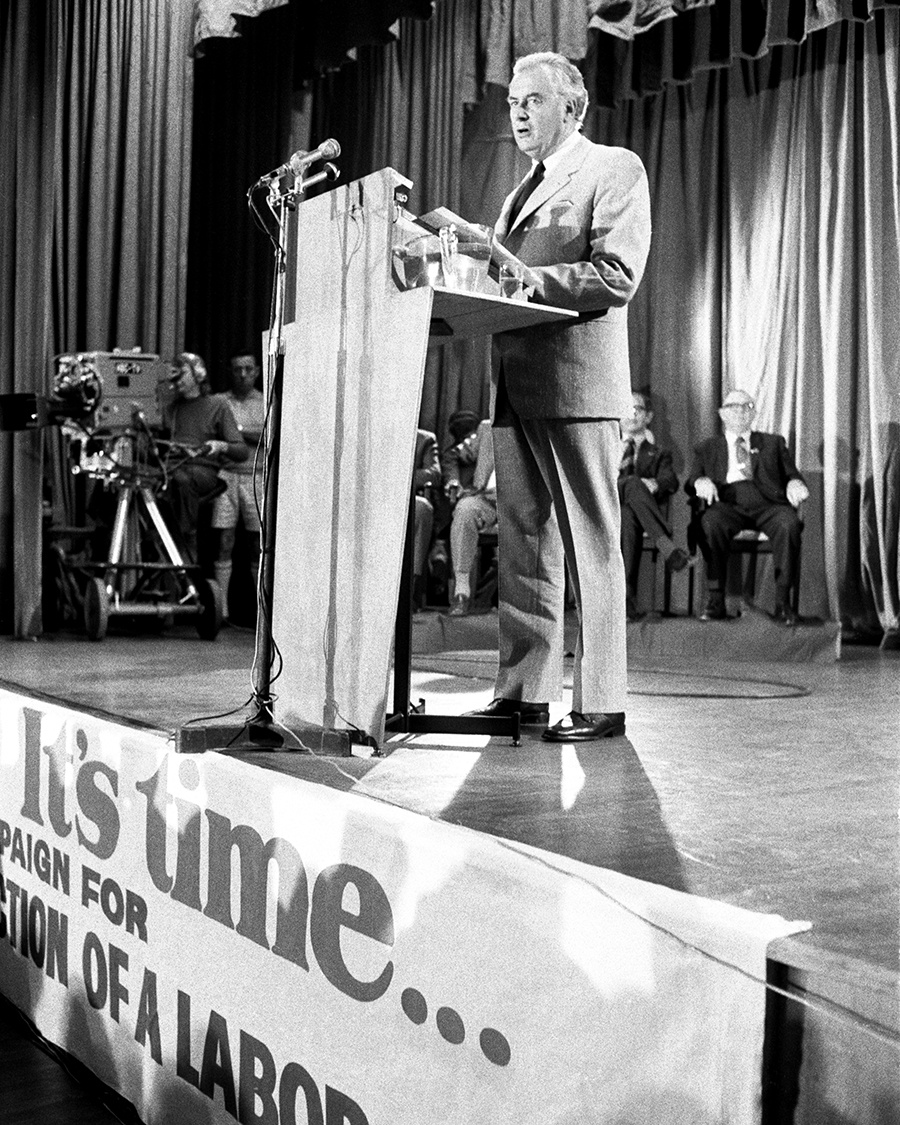
Gough Whitlam delivering a policy speech in 1972, the year the DSS was established.

=== Precursor ===
The Department of Social Security followed the absolvement of the Department of Social Services which existed as an Australian government agency between April 1939 and December 1972 under the Menzies government and became fully operative in 1941.

=== Establishment ===
The DSS largely filled the same functions as the previous Department of Social Services, while taking over some programs from the Department of Health.

The department's delivery of payments and services functions was taken over by Centrelink in 1997. The creation of Centrelink meant significant changes to DSS, with the department shrinking in size to approximately 700 staff who were tasked with policy formulation and advisory functions.

=== Dissolution ===
In October 1998, the DSS was dissolved with the new Department of Family and Community Services taking on all remaining DSS functions.

== Reporting ==
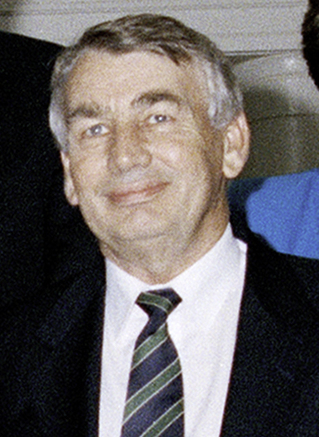
Brian Howe, Minister for Social Security in 1986

To ensure the DSS was viewed as a legitimate department, the DSS was one of the few Commonwealth departments in Australia to publish annual reports. This new method of accounting was attributed to align with the broader agenda of New Public Management in the 1970s.

The DSS's appearance as a legitimate agency was stated to be critical due to two reasons. First, under New Public Management, there was an agenda to keep government structures and intervention at a minimum, thus the DSS needed to establish its necessity. Second, the DSS was responsible for distributing large amounts of taxpayer's money, requiring public trust.

=== Cass Social Security Review ===
In February 1986, the then Minister for Social Security, Brian Howe, established the Cass Social Security Review. The Review is named after Bettina Cass and concentrates on three aspects of social security policy:

- income support for families with children;
- social security and workforce issues;
- income support for the aged

Under the Review, six publications were made. The publications are intended to promote debate and consultation. According to Herscovitch and Stanton, the Review refocused attention on encouraging and facilitating economic and social participation for customers, particularly those who were disabled, single parents or unemployed.

== Strategy and Planning ==
=== Operational Framework for Continuous Improvement in the Department ===
The Department of Social Security's Corporate Management Committee endorsed the Operational Framework for Continuous Improvement in the Department in September 1995. This program involved staff consultation with more than 150 Regional, Deputy Area and Area Managers. The program emphasised the creation of standards, benchmarks, applying best practices, and re-engineering.

This program operated on three levels

- National;
- Area;
- Regional

=== Corporate Management Committee ===
The Corporate Management Committee (CMC )endorsed best practices and monitors coordination of continuous improvement measures, ensuring national programs are effective at the national, Area and Regional level. The CMC also used information provided by the Pensioner concession card (PCC) regarding the DSS' proposed program of work.

=== Pensioner concession card (PCC) ===
The PCC monitored the national program of continuous improvement work through program plans and filtered information on activities from Area and Regional networks. This information was presented to the Corporate Management Committee. The PCC chose activities that had national application to create a national program of work for the Department of Social Security.

=== DSS Strategic Plan 1995–2005 ===
DSS Strategic Plan 1995-2005 was the DSS' roadmap. The roadmap included a revised Departmental Charter which

- Underpinned DSS' values
- Set a benchmark for success
- Identified the priorities for the DSS
- Aided in developing programs and business plans

The Plan identified the importance of the application of best practice and process improvement.

== Access and Equity ==
As part of the Government's Social Justice Strategy, the Department of Social Security implemented the Access and Equity program.

Under the Government's Social Justice Strategy, each Commonwealth portfolio was required to publish a three-year Access and Equity Plan in 1988 and 1991.

The Access and Equity program provided service for individuals who may face race, language or cultural barriers or are disadvantaged by remoteness. The program's implementation resulted in a better level of service among customers and greater staff satisfaction in knowing the DSS' programs were accessible for all customers.

Aboriginal People and Torres Strait Islanders and Migrants from Non-English Speaking Backgrounds were the two access and equity target groups.

The first DSS Access and Equity Plan ended in 1990. The evaluation of this Plan supported improvements for access and equity for target populations.

The second DSS Access and Equity Plan for 1990-93 implemented recommendations from the evaluation of the first plan.

Groups identified as experiencing barriers to services

- Individuals subject to emotional, physical and sexual violence;
- Vulnerable persons (e.g. a child, or an adult who is unable to protect themselves against exploitation);
- Indigenous Australians;
- Deaf;
- Mobility and access restriction;
- Blind or low vision;
- Hard of hearing;
- Culturally and Linguistically Diverse (CALD);
- transgender, queer or intersex (LGBTI)

=== Support Network for Aboriginal and Torres Strait Islander Parents (SNAP) Program ===
Announced in the 1989 Federal Budget, the SNAP Program aimed to better coordinate and improve the efficiency and effectiveness of the range of government assistance programs available to Aboriginal and Torres Strait Islanders.

The SNAP Program had two main objectives. The first objective was to ensure Aboriginal and Torres Strait Islander families received their DSS entitlements. Providing correct entitlements to these families was fundamental to raising their standard of living.

The second objective was to improve the knowledge of the range of family and child-related services and funding programs available to Aboriginal and Torres Strait Islander families and link family and community groups. To improve this knowledge, the SNAP Program aimed to actively involve families and community groups in identifying their needs and the solutions to them by using appropriate funding programs and community action.

=== Evaluation of the SNAP Program ===
In 1993, the House of Representatives Standing Committee conducted an inquiry into the Implementation of the Commonwealth's Access and Equity Strategy by Commonwealth government agencies. The inquiry produced a report titled 'Rhetoric or Reality?'.

The Report found that the SNAP Program empowered communities through the intervention of SNAP Officers in their lives. These communities found SNAP Officers provided practical and tangible assistance by responding to expressed needs and ongoing involvement and commitment. Staff from other agencies who had worked with SNAP Officers also supported these officers.

The report also stated that the SNAP Program successfully met its initial objectives and established a model for efficient and effective coordination, delivery and implementation of government programs to assist Aboriginal and Torres Strait Islander communities to deal with the effects of long-term poverty and disadvantage.

=== Recruiting Aboriginal and Torres Strait Staff Within the DSS Network ===
The DSS aimed for a minimum of 2% of Aboriginal and Torres Strait representation in regions with high proportions of Aboriginal and Torres Strait Islander customers.

=== Aboriginal and Torres Strait Islander Liaison Officer (AILO) Scheme ===
The AILO Scheme was established in 1975 as a conduit between the DSS and Aboriginal and Torres Strait Islanders.

The DSS employed AILOs who:

- Conduct fieldwork in urban and remote communities to help Aboriginal and Torres Strait Islanders claim social security payments and maintain entitlements to these payments;
- Promote knowledge of DSS programs;
- Assist to DSS staff in more complex dealings with Aboriginal and Torres Strait Islander people within Regional Offices

Between 1992 and 1993, a review of the AILO program found improvements are required but found an essential role of AILOs in assisting the Department's Aboriginal and Torres Strait Islander clients.

=== Ethnic Community Services ===
The migrant services section (MSS) was part of the DSS' national administration and was responsible for coordinating programs for those from people non-English speaking backgrounds.

The MSS aided in establishing the vision for DSS's policy, programs and services and developing and monitoring the priorities under the Access and Equity Plan.

The migrant services units (MSUs) supported the MSS in each state by providing feedback on the impact of DSS policies, programs and services and consulting with ethnic organisations, government agencies and service providers to improve the DSS's delivery of services and effectiveness to migrants.

=== Consultations with Migrant Communities from Non-English Speaking Backgrounds ===
There are three levels at which consultation is conducted

1. National level: the Minister or seniors DSS officers consulted with the Federation of Ethnic Communities' Councils of Australia (FECCA)
2. State and Territories: each state and territory had a Migrant Advisor Committee which meets four times a year. The MAC provides a forum for ethnic communities to raise issues with the DSS
3. Community: community seminars were established to explain changes in social security programs

=== Evaluation ===
Under the 1993 Portfolio Evaluation Plan, an evaluation of the second DSS Access and Equity Plan for 1990–91 to 1992-93 was conducted. The evaluation examined the performance of the Access and Equity Plan against strategies relating to the delivery of information, language services and community consultation.

Main recommendations from the Evaluation concerned:

- Correcting existing programs and services;
- Increasing staff knowledge of specialists in planning and management of Access and Equity in the DSS;
- Special programs for target groups;
- Language and information services;
- Special client groups;
- Consultations with Access and Equity target groups

== Projects ==
=== Adequacy Project ===
In 1995, the DSS established the Adequacy Project. The project commissioned the Social Policy Research Centre to create standards for income support payments using a budget standards methodology. These standards were created successfully but were not government endorsed. The lack of endorsement and incorporation is attributed to the entrance of the new Liberal government that had new priorities.

=== Budget Standards Project ===
Released in May 1995, Developing a Framework for Benchmarks of Adequacy for Social Security Payments: Policy Discussion Paper No. 6 was the department's first attempt to assess conceptual and methodological issues in assessing the adequacy of social security payments.

The report resulted in the Budget Standards Project. The Budget Standards Project was a two-year exploratory project that began in 1995 with the financial support of the DDS, conducted by the Social Policy Research Centre (SPRC) of the University of New South Wales. The Project identified indicative income requirements of different households.

The Project was based on focus groups of low-income people and using ABS surveys using middle income households. This information was used to create a standard of spending from the different demographics through compiling a list of items people were most likely to purchase or needed to purchase.

=== Living Standards ===
In the mid-1990s, the DSS with the Australian Bureau of Statistics (ABS) on a 'Living Standards' approach. The 'Living Standards' approach focused on client outcomes.

The DSS commissioned Peter Travers and Frances Robertson from Flinders University to survey 110 DSS recipients. The researchers assessed the incidence of deprivation among DSS clients and explored the relationship between levels of relative deprivation and other factors such as DSS payment type, full or part-rate benefit and demographics.

The ABS developed and incorporated 16 indicators of financial stress into its regular Household Expenditure Survey. Questions in the financial stress module asked survey participants about their possession of household 'essentials', participation in social activities, their ability to pay bills, raise money for emergencies.

Their study concluded that:

- Income was a poor indicator of deprivation;
- Aged recipients were less deprived than other social security recipients;
- Unemployed on full-rate payment were most deprived

The study consisted of focus groups that had a three-fold role. First, to provide comment on the composition of the preliminary budget standards and to suggest areas of improvement. Second, to discuss the costed budget standards and to advise where amendments were required, and third to guide aspects of the customisation of the basic standards.

=== Disability support pension ===
The disability support pension was the primary source of income support for disabled people who could not support themselves with paid employment.

Initially introduced under the Invalid and Old-age Pensions Act 1908 in 1910 as the Invalid pension, the pension provided income support for those who were 16 years and over and permanently incapacitated for work.

Under the DSS, the Disability Reform Package was created to assist people with disabilities into employment rather than place them on long-term income support.

The reforms were announced in the 1990-91 Federal Budget and changed the name from 'invalid pension' to the 'disability support pension'. The eligibility criteria for the pension also changed. Previously the pension required the individual to have 85% permanent incapacity work. In contrast, under the reforms, the individual must be unable to work at least 30 hours per week at total award wages for a minimum of two years due to physical, intellectual or psychiatric impairment, and a minimum impairment threshold of 20%.

=== Other programs ===
- Jobs, Education and Training (JET) program for sole parent pensioners began in 1989;
- Jobsearch/Newstart programs for unemployed people;
- Child Support Scheme for the administrative assessment and collection of non-resident parents' liabilities for the support of their children from 1988 and 1989

== Criticism and abolishment ==
Submissions regarding the DSS's flaws in policy and procedure for information release regarding child abuse or 'reasonable grounds for concern' resulted in changes to departmental channels to change the Social Security provisions for release of information. The change from the Labor Government to the Liberal Government in 1998 saw the service delivery function of the DSS transferred to the statutory agency, now named Centrelink. Centrelink overtook some of the functions of the Department of Employment, Education, Training and Youth Affairs (DEETYA) and other Federal Government services.

== Minister for Social Security ==
The following were appointed as Minister for Social Services, managing the Department of Social Security.

| Order | Minister | Party | Prime Minister | Title | Term start | Term end | Term in office |
|---|---|---|---|---|---|---|---|
| 1 | Lance Barnard | Labor | Whitlam | Minister for Social Services | 5 December 1972 | 19 December 1972 | 14 days |
| 2 | Don Grimes | Labor | Hawke | Minister for Community Services | 13 December 1984 | 16 February 1987 | 2 years, 65 days |
| 3 | Chris Hurford | Labor | Hawke | Minister for Community Services | 16 February 1987 | 24 July 1987 | 158 days |
| 4 | Neal Blewett | Labor | Hawke | Minister for Community Services and Health | 24 July 1987 | 4 April 1990 | 2 years, 254 days |
| 5 | Brian Howe | Labor | Hawke | Minister for Community Services and Health | 4 April 1990 | 7 June 1991 | 3 years, 355 days |
| 5 | Brian Howe | Labor | Hawke | Minister for Health, Housing and Community Services | 7 June 1991 | 20 December 1991 | 3 years, 355 days |
| 5 | Brian Howe | Labor | Keating | Minister for Health, Housing and Community Services | 20 December 1991 | 24 March 1993 | 3 years, 355 days |
| 5 | Brian Howe | Labor | Keating | Minister for Housing, Local Government and Community Services | 24 March 1993 | 23 December 1993 | 3 years, 355 days |
| 5 | Brian Howe | Labor | Keating | Minister for Housing, Local Government and Human Services | 23 December 1993 | 25 March 1994 | 3 years, 355 days |
| 6 | Carmen Lawrence | Labor | Keating | Minister for Human Services and Health | 25 March 1994 | 11 March 1996 | 1 year, 352 days |
| 7 | Michael Wooldridge | Liberal | Howard | Minister for Health and Family Services | 11 March 1996 | 21 October 1998 | 954 days |
| 8 | Jocelyn Newman | Liberal | Howard | Minister for Family and Community Services | 21 October 1998 | 30 January 2001 | 832 days |

== See also ==
- Social Security Appeals Tribunal
- Social security in Australia
- MySuper
- Social Security Act 1991
- ABSTUDY
- AUSTUDY Scheme
- Austudy Payment
- Community Development Employment Projects
- Supported Accommodation Assistance Program

== References and further reading ==
- Secretariat Branch, Department of Social Security (1987), One big family : a short history of the Department of Social Security, Department of Social Security
- Fuery, Michael (1994). "The Department of Social Security's Support Network for Aboriginal and Torres Strait Islander Parents Program". Journal of Social Security.
- Davis, Nicholas (2017). "The annual reporting practices of an Australian Commonwealth Government department: An instance of deinstitutionalisation". Accounting History.
- De Gail, Tony (1994). "Migrant services". Social Security Journal.
- Neville Banks, C.; Kratochvil, Roman (1986). "Causes Of Blindness in Australia: Analysis of Pensions Granted by the Department of Social Security on the Ground of Blindness For the Year Ending 30 June 1984". Australian and New Zealand Journal of Ophthalmology.
- Nicolaou, Loucas (1998). "introduction: Recent Poverty Research and DSS – an overview of the Adequacy Project". Strategic Analysis and Evaluation Branch Department of Social Security.
- Baban, Tom (December 1994). "Aboriginal and Torres Strait Islander Services". Social Security Journal.
- Thomson, David (1994). "Living Decently: Material Well-being in Australia". Policy.
- Brown, Philip; Rowlands, David (1996). "Implementation of policy: some perspectives from recent experience in the Department of Social Security". Journal of Social Security.
- Cheryl, David (1996). "Best Practice and Continuous Improvement in the Department of Social Security". Journal of Social Security.
- Herscovitch, Andrew; Stanton, David (2008). "History of Social Security in Australia" (PDF). Family Matters. 80: 51–60. Archived from the original (PDF) on 29 November 2010.
- Department of Social Security (1988), History of Pensions and Other Benefits in Australia, Australian Bureau of Statistics
- Palma, Manny (1995). "Where We've Come From and Where We're Going: The Key Directions for the Department of Social Security in Access and Equity". Journal of Social Security.
- Henman, Paul (1998). "Making real the assumptions of the Budget Standards Project: the strengths and weaknesses for policy work". Journal of Social Security.
- An Australian Entitlements Commission (PDF) (Report). Australian Catholic Social Services. 22 September 2008.
- Department of Social Security (May 1995). Developing a Framework for Benchmarks of Adequacy for Social Security Payments (PDF) (Report). Australian Government Publishing Service.
- Encel, Diana (October 1999). Budget Standards and Income Adequacy: An Annotated Bibliography (Report). Social Policy Research Centre.
- Annual Report 1992-93 (Report). Department of Social Security. 1993.
- "Income Support: Social security transfer payments" (Press release). 4102.0 - Australian Social Trends, 1994. Canberra: Australian Bureau of Statistics. 27 May 1994.
- Saunders, Peter; Chalmers, Jenny; McHugh, Marilyn; Murray, Colette; Bittman, Michael; Bradbury, Bruce (March 1998). Development of Indicative Budget Standards for Australia (PDF) (Report). Assisted by Roisin Thank, Denise Thompson and Sally Doran. University of New South Wales.
- House of Representatives Standing Committee on Aboriginal and Torres Strait Islander Affairs (September 1995). Access and equity – rhetoric or reality? : report of the inquiry into the implementation of the access and equity strategy (Report). Commonwealth of Australia.
- Phillips, Janet (16 June 2008). Disability support and services in Australia (Report). Parliament of Australia.
- Commonwealth of Australia (June 1992). A Matter of Survival: Government Response to the Recommendations of the House of Representatives Standing Committee on Aboriginal and Torres Strait Islander Affairs Inquiry into Aboriginal and Torres Strait Islander Language Maintenance Report (PDF) (Report). Parliament of Australia.
- Office of Multicultural Affairs (1992). Access and Equity: Evaluation Summary (PDF) (Report). Australian Government Printing Service.
- Australia's Prime Ministers: Robert Menzies, National Archives of Australia, 2014, archived from the original on 13 November 2013
- Search: Department of Social Security, National Archives of Australia, 2022
- The Biographical Dictionary of the Australian Senate, Commonwealth of Australia, 2013
- Cooke, M.K.; Martin, K.L. (2008). "Change from within? social work proposals to change centrelink policy in cases of suspected child abuse". Australian Social Work.
- Cass, Bettina (1986). The case for review of aspects of the Australian social security system. Background paper 1. Woden, A.C.T: Dept. of Social Security. ISBN 978-0-642-51604-6.
- Regan, Sue (2014), Australia’s welfare system: a review of reviews 1941-2013 (PDF), Australian National University
