= Jim Brigden =

Australian public servant

Secretary of the Department of Supply and Development
- In office 29 August 1939 – 8 April 1941

Secretary of the Department of Munitions
- In office 11 June 1940 – 31 December 1941

Personal details
- Born: James Bristock Brigden; 20 July 1887 Maldon, Victoria, Australia
- Died: 12 October 1950 (aged 63) Mitcham, Victoria, Australia
- Occupation: Public servant

James Bristock Brigden (20 July 1887 – 12 October 1950) was a senior Australian public servant, heading Australian Government departments during World War II.

== Life and career ==
Brigden was born in Maldon, Victoria on 20 July 1887. He attended school in Victoria, but left at age 16 with a job as a cabin-boy on a ship to England.

In 1915 Brigden enlisted in the Australian Imperial Force as a private. He was wounded in France.

After the First World War, Brigden moved to Tasmania, where he was appointed as a tutor to Workers' Educational Association classes at Queenstown, in the state's west. He went on to become the Professor of Economics at University of Tasmania, staying in the position until his resignation in June 1929.

In 1935 Brigden was appointed Queensland government statistician. In 1938, he was appointed chairman of the National Insurance Commission, responsible for health insurance and pensions and benefits functions. In May 1939, then Health Minister Frederick Stewart announced that Brigden would be appointed to devote some of his time as an advisor to the new Department of Supply and Development, but was to retain his Insurance Commission Chairmanship. When the National Insurance Plan collapsed, he also became Secretary of the Department of Social Services, which lost much of its momentum at the outbreak of World War II.

His appointment as Secretary of the Department of Supply and Development was announced in November 1939.

Brigden was diagnosed with dangerous blood pressure in 1947 and invalidated out of the public service that year. He died in Mitcham, Melbourne on 12 October 1950.

Government offices
New title Department established	Secretary of the Department of Social Services; 1939 – 1941	Succeeded by Frank Rowe
Preceded by Daniel McVey	Secretary of the Department of Supply and Development; 1939 – 1941	Succeeded by Arthur Smith
Preceded by Himself as Secretary of the Department of Supply and Development	Secretary of the Department of Munitions; 1940 – 1941	Succeeded by John Jensen
