= Department of Shipping and Transport =

Former government department of Australia

Department overview
- Formed: 11 May 1951
- Preceding Department: Department of Fuel, Shipping and Transport Department of Supply
- Dissolved: 19 December 1972
- Superseding Department: Department of Secondary Industry Department of Transport (III)
- Jurisdiction: Commonwealth of Australia
- Headquarters: Melbourne
- Department executives: Charles Hector McFadyen, Secretary (1951–1957); Dudley Williams, Secretary (1957–1969); Malcolm Macgregor Summers, Secretary (1969–1972)

The Department of Shipping and Transport was an Australian government department that existed between May 1951 and December 1972.

== Scope ==
Information about the department's functions and government funding allocation could be found in the Administrative Arrangements Orders, the annual Portfolio Budget Statements and in the Department's annual reports.

According to the Administrative Arrangements Order made on 21 June 1951, the Department dealt with:

- Shipping, including the best utilization of the Australian Coastal Fleet, the chartering of ships, the operation of Commonwealth-owned and chartered ships.
- Shipbuilding and the repair and maintenance of ships (other than naval vessels).
- Movement of Commonwealth explosives.
- Provision of facilities at Australian ports for handling Commonwealth explosives.
- Commonwealth Handling Equipment Pool.
- Control and maintenance of coastal lights and other aids to navigation on the sea routes around the Australian coastline.
- Control of marine services, such as surveys of ships, inspection of ships' gear, safe loading of ships, accommodation for ships' crews, engagement and discharge of seamen, examinations of masters, mates and engineers, licensing of ships to engage in coasting trade, wrecks and salvage, Courts of Marine Enquiry, Seamen's Compensation.
- Collection of Colonial Light Dues and remission of collection to United Kingdom.
- Commonwealth Railways.
- Administration of Standardization of Railways Agreements.
- Commonwealth aid for roads and works.
- Australian Transport Advisory Council.

== Structure ==
The Department was an Australian Public Service department, staffed by officials who were responsible to the Minister for Shipping and Transport.

== Publication ==
- 1962 short run Bulletin - Australia. Department of Shipping and Transport. Transport Development Branch (1962), Bulletin, Dept. of Shipping and Transport
