= Department of Munitions =

Australian Government department, 1940–1948

Department overview
- Formed: 11 June 1940
- Preceding Department: Department of Supply and Development (I) - for Commonwealth factories and aircraft production
- Dissolved: 6 April 1948
- Superseding Department: Department of Supply and Development (II)
- Jurisdiction: Commonwealth of Australia
- Headquarters: Melbourne
- Minister responsible: Robert Menzies; Philip McBride; Norman Makin; John Dedman; John Armstrong, Minister for Munitions
- Department executives: Jim Brigden, Secretary (1940‑41); John Jensen, Secretary (1942‑48); Essington Lewis, Director General (1940‑45)

The Department of Munitions was an Australian government department that existed between 11 June 1940 and April 1948. Reporting to it was the Factory Board, which was in charge of the six Small Arms Ammunition Factories, along with a number of ammunition and explosives factories across Australia. The Minister for Munitions was responsible for the department.

== History ==
The department was created during World War II in an effort to speed up munitions production, after it became apparent that Britain would not be able to supply Australia's armed forces with arms and ammunition throughout what was shaping up to be a long and hard war. The department was created on 11 June 1940, only about a week after the end of the evacuation of Dunkirk, where British forces were forced to leave Europe without most of their vehicles, armour and artillery. The department's main responsibility was the oversight of increased production of defence components.

Between November 1940 and November 1941, the Salisbury Explosives Factory, then the largest such factory in Australia, was built in farmland area north of Adelaide (now Edinburgh). The site was chosen because of "its strategic position and its proximity to rail transport, and to a water supply and labour". The architect Herbert Jory was engaged by the department to oversee the building of the factory, which at its height employed 3000 labourers and tradesmen seven days a week. The factory was completed within a year.

In South Australia, other factories were built at Finsbury (now Woodville North) and Hendon. In addition, the South Australian Railways workshops at Islington as well as automotive and other plants were converted in order to produce the machinery of war. The Commonwealth Munitions Supply Laboratories moved into some of the Finsbury buildings after the war.

In April 1948 the department was wound up and its functions shifted to the Department of Supply and Development, a change necessitated due to the legislation that the munitions department had been established under during wartime, that could not continue indefinitely.

== Structure and functions ==
The department was a Commonwealth Public Service department, staffed by officials who were responsible to the Minister for Munitions.

The position of Minister for Munitions was occupied by (in chronological order):

- Robert Menzies (June 1941 – September 1940);
- Philip McBride (from after the September 1940 election until 1941);
- Norman Makin (1941 — November 1946?);
- John Dedman (November 1946 –?); and
- John Armstrong (? – 1948).

The Factory Board was a body that was in charge of the six Small Arms Ammunition Factories, along with a number of ammunition and explosives factories across Australia.

Other information about the department's functions and government funding allocation could be found in the Administrative Arrangements Orders, the annual Portfolio Budget Statements and in the department's annual reports.
