= John Jensen (public servant) =

Australian public servant (1884–1970)

Sir John Jensen OBE

Secretary of the Department of Munitions
- In office 1 January 1942 – 5 April 1948

Secretary of the Department of Supply and Development
- In office 6 July 1948 – 31 July 1949

Personal details
- Born: John Klunder; 20 March 1884 Bendigo, Victoria
- Died: 17 February 1970 (aged 85) Hawthorn, Melbourne, Victoria
- Resting place: Box Hill Cemetery
- Spouse(s): Maria Ruby Gordon (m. 1911)
- Occupation: Public servant

Sir John Klunder Jensen OBE (20 March 1884 – 17 February 1970) was a senior Australian public servant. He was Secretary of the Department of Munitions between 1942 and 1948.

== Life and career ==
John Jensen was born in Bendigo, Victoria on 20 March 1884.

He joined the Commonwealth Public Service in 1901, the year of Australia's federation and the year the service was first established.

In 1920, Jensen visited the United States on rifle-manufacturing business, and he went on to study factory administration in England and in the United States.

In January 1942, Jensen was appointed Secretary of the Department of Munitions. During his time as permanent head of the Munitions department, he was a member of the Allied Supply Standing Committee and the executive of the Allied Supply Council. In the role, he played a leading part in organizing munitions supply during World War II. His department was abolished in 1948 during scaling down after the end of world war II. At this time, Jensen was moved to head the Department of Supply and Development. In his role at the Department of Supply and Development, he found himself frequently journeying to South Australia, including to visit the Woomera Rocket Range, and in connection to uranium mining.

Jensen retired in 1949. Immediately after retirement he took work as a member of the Commonwealth Immigration Planning Council.

On 17 February 1970, Jensen died in Hawthorn, Melbourne.

== Awards and honours ==
In 1938, Jensen was appointed an Officer of the Order of the British Empire. In the 1950 Birthday Honours he was made a Knight Bachelor, for services to munitions production.

In December 1969, the Victorian headquarters of the Department of Supply was named Jensen House in his honour.

Government offices
Preceded by Jim Brigden	Secretary of the Department of Munitions; 1942 – 1948	Succeeded by Himself as Secretary of the Department of Supply and Development
Preceded by Frank O'Connor as Secretary of the Department of Supply and Shipping	Secretary of the Department of Supply and Development; 1948 – 1949	Succeeded by Harold Breen
Preceded by Himself as Secretary of the Department of Munitions	Secretary of the Department of Supply and Development; 1948 – 1949	Succeeded by Harold Breen
