= Department of Supply and Development (1939–1942) =

Australian Government department

Department overview
- Formed: 26 April 1939
- Preceding Department: Department of the Interior (I)
- Dissolved: 17 October 1942
- Superseding Department: Department of Supply and Shipping
- Jurisdiction: Commonwealth of Australia
- Ministers responsible: Richard Casey, Minister (1939–1940); Frederick Stewart, Minister (1940); Philip McBride, Minister (1940–1941); George McLeay, Minister (1941); Jack Beasley, Minister (1941–1942)
- Department executives: Daniel McVey, Secretary (1939); Jim Brigden, Secretary (1939–1941); Arthur Smith, Secretary (1941–1942)

The Department of Supply and Development was an Australian government department that existed between April 1939 and October 1942.

== Scope ==
Information about the department's functions and government funding allocation could be found in the Administrative Arrangements Orders, the annual Portfolio Budget Statements and in the department's annual reports.

The functions of the department at first included:

- provision or supply of munitions;
- the manufacture or assembly of aircraft, or parts by the Commonwealth or by authority of the Commonwealth;
- arrangements for the establishment or extension of industries for purposes of defence;
- the acquisition, maintenance and disposal of stocks of goods in connection with defence;
- the arrangement or coordination of surveys of Australian industrial capacity; and
- planning to ensure effective operation in time of war and decentralise secondary industries, particularly those relating to defence investigation and development of Australian sources of supply of goods in time of war, particularly additional oil resources, production of power, alcohol from sugar or other crops and the production of oil from coal or shale.

=== Department of Munitions ===
On 11 June 1940, the Department of Munitions was created in an effort to speed up munitions production during World War II, after it became apparent that Britain would not be able to supply Australia's armed forces with arms and ammunition throughout what was shaping up to be a long and hard war. The department was created on 11 June 1940, only about a week after the end of the evacuation of Dunkirk, where British forces were forced to leave Europe without most of their vehicles, armour and artillery. The department's main responsibility was the oversight of increased production of defence components.

== Structure ==
The department was a Commonwealth Public Service department, staffed by officials who were responsible to the Minister for Supply and Development.
