= Postmaster-General's Department =

Australian government department, 1901–1975

Department overview
- Formed: 1 January 1901; 125 years ago
- Dissolved: 22 December 1975; 50 years ago
- Superseding Department: Postal & Telecommunications Department
- Jurisdiction: Australia

The Postmaster-General's Department (PMG) was a department of the Australian government, established at Federation in 1901, whose responsibilities included the provision of postal and telegraphic services throughout Australia. It was abolished in December 1975 and replaced by the Postal & Telecommunications Department. Two separate legal entities had been established in July 1975 to take over the department's operations: Telecom Australia (that later became Telstra) and Australia Post.

== History ==
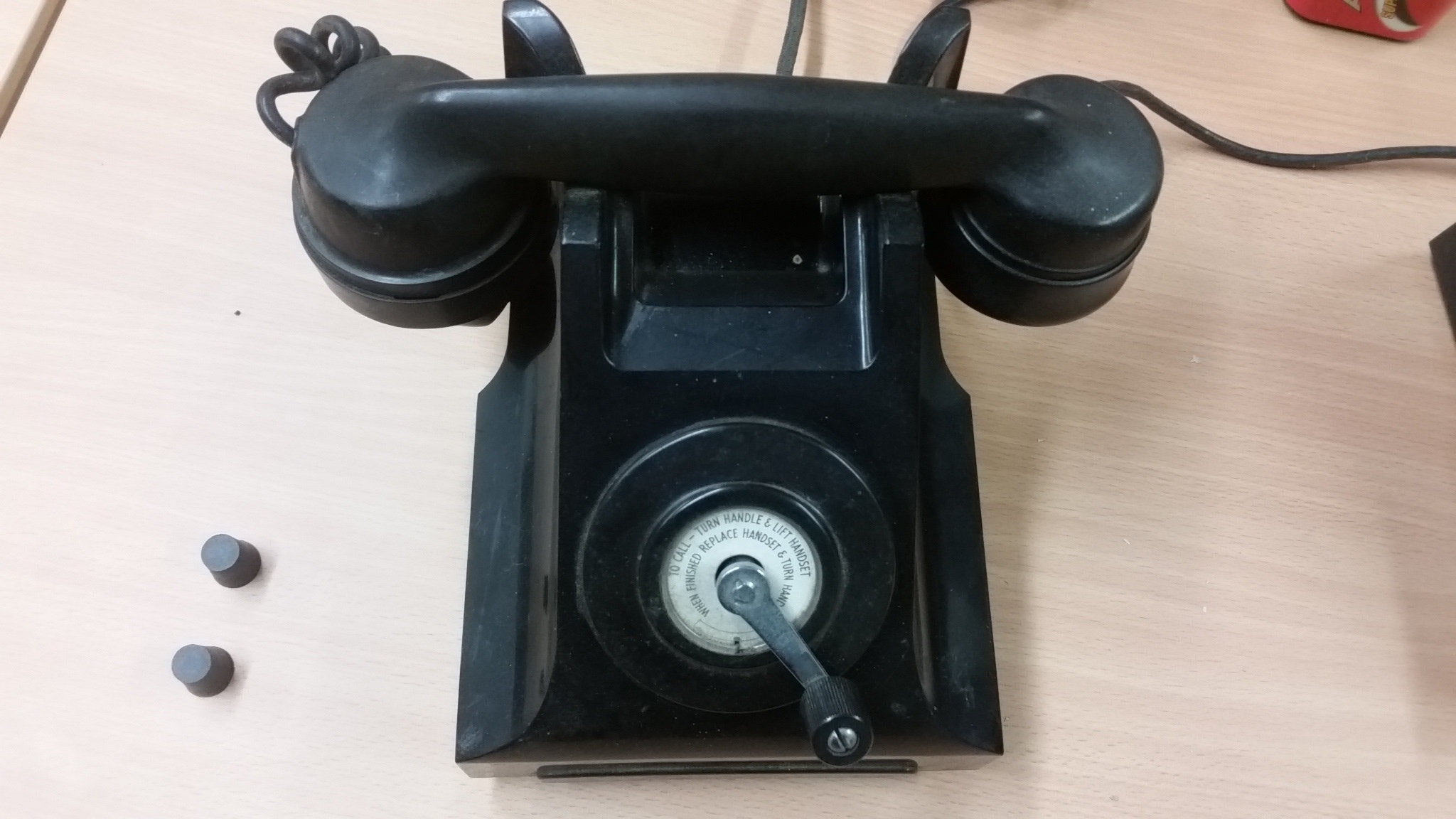
Manual telephone, c. 1950. The phone and lines remained the property of the PMG.

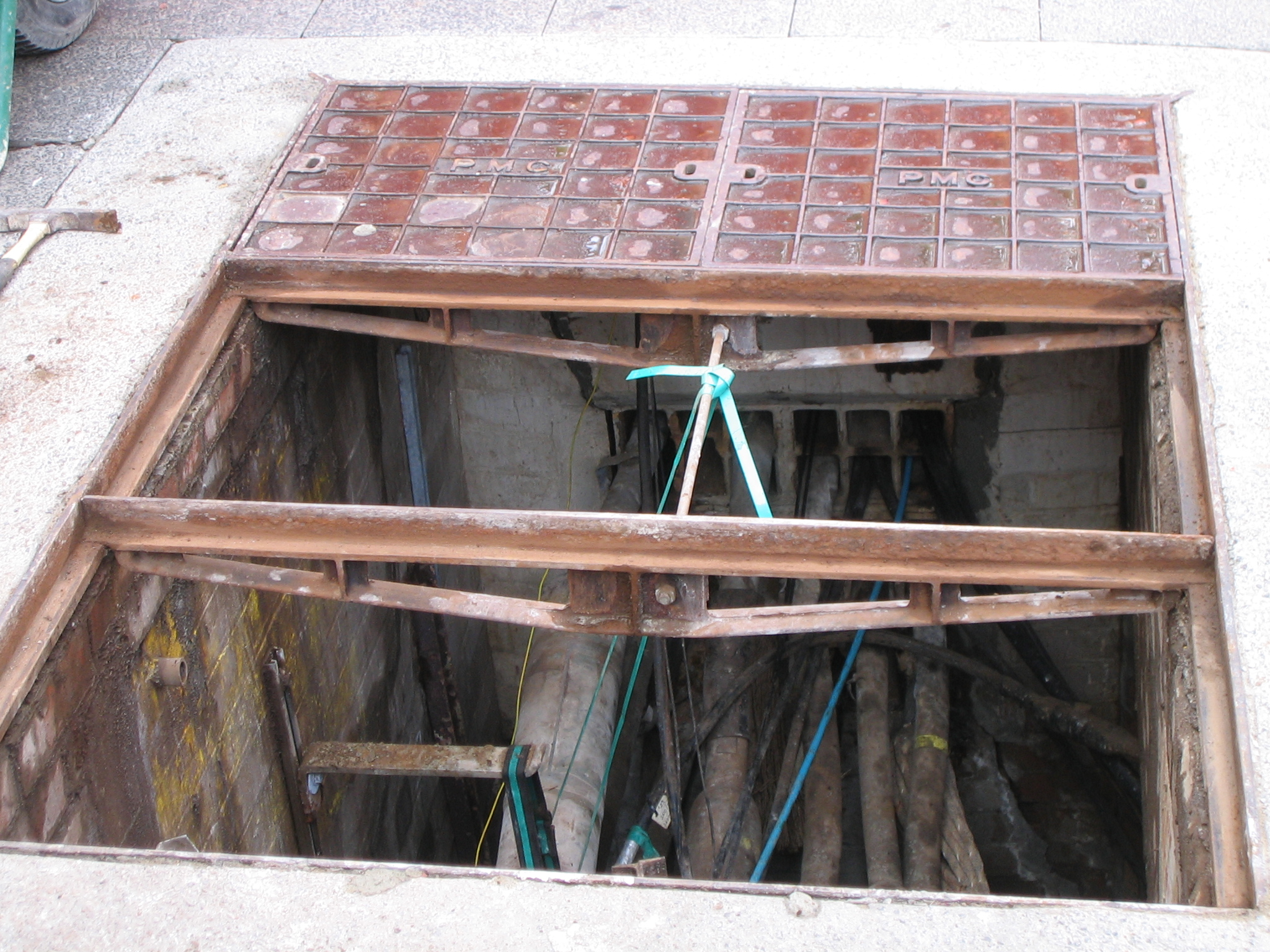
The "PMG" stamp can still be found on many manhole covers, such as this one in central Perth

The Postmaster-General's Department was established on 1 January 1901 to take over all postal and telegraphy services in Australia from the states and administer them on a national basis. The department was administered by the postmaster-general.

The first permanent secretary of the department was Sir Robert Townley Scott, who held office from 1 July 1901 until his retirement on 31 December 1910.

In its first 25 years, the department grew from 6,000 to 10,000 offices and from 18,000 to 47,000 staff. Earnings grew from £2.4 million to £10 million per annum.

In mid-1975 the department was disaggregated into the Australian Telecommunications Commission trading as Telecom Australia and the Australian Postal Commission trading as Australia Post. In 1993 the Spectrum Management Agency was formed to take responsibility of radio and television broadcast licensing, which was then merged into the Australian Communications Authority, that later became the Australian Communications & Media Authority. Telecom Australia changed its name to Telstra in 1993 and has since been privatised.

=== Abolition ===
The department was abolished in December 1975 by the Fraser government, and replaced by the Postal & Telecommunications Department. The change was intended to take account of the increase in the functions of the department to include all electronic media matters which had previously been the responsibility of the Department of the Media.

== List of postmasters-general ==
Order	Portrait	Minister	Party	Prime Minister	Term start	Term end	Term in office
1		John Forrest	Protectionist	Barton	1 January 1901	17 January 1901	16 days
2		James Drake	Protectionist	Barton	5 February 1901	10 August 1903	2 years, 186 days
3		Philip Fysh	Protectionist	Barton	10 August 1903	24 September 1903	261 days
3		Philip Fysh	Protectionist	Deakin	24 September 1903	27 April 1904	261 days
4		Hugh Mahon	Labor	Watson	27 April 1904	17 August 1904	112 days
5		Sydney Smith	Free Trade	Reid	17 August 1904	5 July 1905	322 days
6		Austin Chapman	Protectionist	Deakin	5 July 1905	30 July 1907	2 years, 25 days
7		Samuel Mauger	Protectionist	Deakin	30 July 1907	13 November 1908	1 year, 106 days
8		Josiah Thomas	Labor	Fisher	13 November 1908	2 June 1909	201 days
9		John Quick	Liberal	Deakin	2 June 1909	29 April 1910	331 days
10		Josiah Thomas	Labor	Fisher	29 April 1910	14 October 1911	1 year, 168 days
11		Charlie Frazer	Labor	Fisher	14 October 1911	24 June 1913	1 year, 253 days
12		Agar Wynne	Liberal	Cook	24 June 1913	17 September 1914	1 year, 85 days
13		William Spence	Labor	Fisher	17 September 1914	27 October 1915	1 year, 40 days
14		William Webster	Labor	Hughes	27 October 1915	14 November 1916	4 years, 99 days
14		William Webster	National Labor	Hughes	14 November 1916	17 February 1917	4 years, 99 days
14		William Webster	Nationalist	Hughes	17 February 1917	3 February 1920	4 years, 99 days
15		George Wise	Nationalist	Hughes	3 February 1920	21 December 1921	1 year, 321 days
16		Alexander Poynton	Nationalist	Hughes	21 December 1921	5 February 1923	1 year, 46 days
17		William Gibson	Country	Bruce	5 February 1923	22 October 1929	6 years, 259 days
18		Joseph Lyons	Labor	Scullin	22 October 1929	4 February 1931	1 year, 105 days
19		Albert Green	Labor	Scullin	4 February 1931	6 January 1932	336 days
20		James Fenton	United Australia	Lyons	6 January 1932	13 October 1932	281 days
21		Archdale Parkhill	United Australia	Lyons	13 October 1932	12 October 1934	1 year, 364 days
22		Alexander McLachlan	United Australia	Lyons	12 October 1934	7 November 1938	6 years, 25 days
23		Archie Cameron	Country	Lyons	7 November 1938	7 April 1939	170 days
23		Archie Cameron	Country	Page	7 April 1939	26 April 1939	170 days
24		Eric Harrison	United Australia	Menzies	26 April 1939	14 March 1940	323 days
25		Harold Thorby	Country	Menzies	14 March 1940	28 October 1940	228 days
26		George McLeay	United Australia	Menzies	28 October 1940	26 June 1941	241 days
27		Thomas Collins	Country	Menzies	26 June 1941	29 August 1941	103 days
27		Thomas Collins	Country	Fadden	29 August 1941	7 October 1941	103 days
28		Bill Ashley	Labor	Curtin	7 October 1941	2 February 1945	3 years, 118 days
29		Don Cameron	Labor	Curtin	2 February 1945	6 July 1945	4 years, 320 days
29		Don Cameron	Labor	Forde	6 July 1945	13 July 1945	4 years, 320 days
29		Don Cameron	Labor	Chifley	13 July 1945	19 December 1949	4 years, 320 days
30		Larry Anthony	Country	Menzies	19 December 1949	11 January 1956	6 years, 23 days
31		Charles Davidson	Country	Menzies	11 January 1956	18 December 1963	7 years, 341 days
32		Alan Hulme	Liberal	Menzies	18 December 1963	26 January 1966	8 years, 353 days
32		Alan Hulme	Liberal	Holt	26 January 1966	19 December 1967	8 years, 353 days
32		Alan Hulme	Liberal	McEwen	19 December 1967	10 January 1968	8 years, 353 days
32		Alan Hulme	Liberal	Gorton	10 January 1968	10 March 1971	8 years, 353 days
32		Alan Hulme	Liberal	McMahon	10 March 1971	5 December 1972	8 years, 353 days
33		Lance Barnard^{1}	Labor	Whitlam	5 December 1972	19 December 1972	14 days
34		Lionel Bowen	Labor	Whitlam	19 December 1972	12 June 1974	1 year, 175 days
35		Reg Bishop	Labor	Whitlam	12 June 1974	11 November 1975	1 year, 152 days
36		Peter Nixon	National Country	Fraser	11 November 1975	22 December 1975	41 days

== List of departmental secretaries and directors-general ==
- 1901–1910: Robert Scott
- 1911–1923: Justinian Oxenham
- 1923–1939: Harry Brown
- 1940–1946: Daniel McVey
- 1946–1949: Bede Fanning
- 1949–1958: Giles Chippindall
- 1958: Van Vanthoff
- 1959–1961: Mervyn Stradwick
- 1961–1965: Frank O'Grady
- 1965–1968: Trevor Housley
- 1968–1972: John Knott
- 1972–1975: Eber Lane
- 1975: Fred Green
