= Justice Annex =

Former building in Ottawa

Coordinates: 45.422067°N 75.704244°W

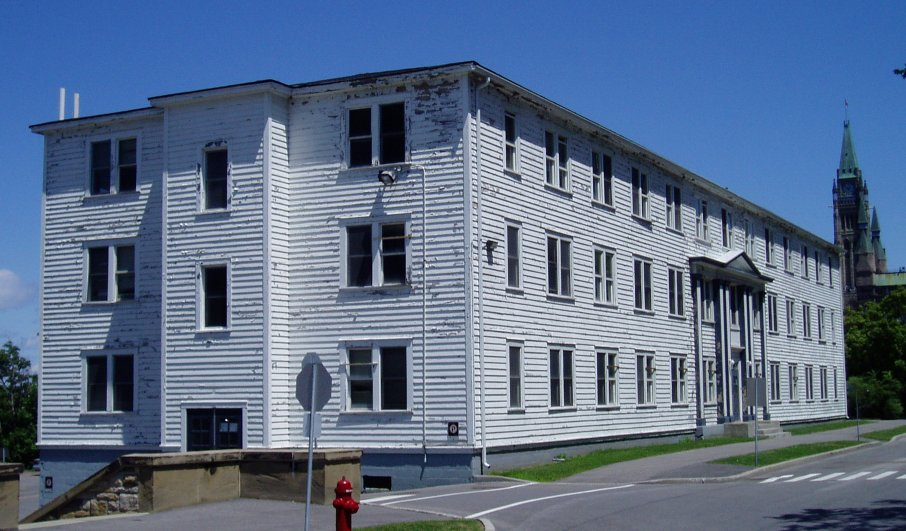
The Justice Annex. It has since been demolished.

The Justice Annex was a building just east of the Supreme Court of Canada and west of Parliament Hill in Ottawa, Ontario, Canada. Built in 1942–3, it was the last surviving representative of many similar temporary buildings erected during the Second World War to house the rapidly growing number of government employees. This building was built to house Royal Canadian Mounted Police (RCMP) officers. It later became the headquarters of C.D. Howe's Department of Munitions and Supply. After the war it was given to the Justice Department and named the Justice Annex.

All these buildings were extremely basic as the main concern was building them quickly and cheaply. The aged and unairconditioned heritage structure was no longer suitable as office space, and was thus used as a storage facility. The government had long desired to replace the building with a more modern one.

This last piece of war time administrative buildings was demolished in the spring 2012.
