= C. D. Howe =

Canadian politician (1886–1960)

The Right Honourable C. D. Howe PC
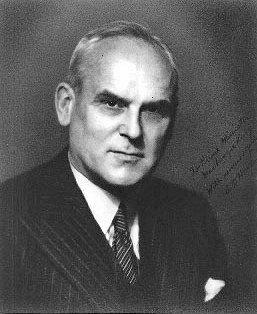
- Howe c. 1940

Minister of Trade and Commerce
- In office 19 January 1948 – 21 June 1957
- Prime Minister: W. L. Mackenzie King; Louis St. Laurent
- Preceded by: James Angus MacKinnon
- Succeeded by: Gordon Churchill

Minister of Defence Production
- In office 1 April 1951 – 20 June 1957
- Prime Minister: Louis St. Laurent
- Preceded by: Office established
- Succeeded by: Howard Charles Green (acting)

Minister of Reconstruction and Supply
- In office 1 January 1946 – 14 November 1948
- Prime Minister: W. L. Mackenzie King
- Preceded by: Office established
- Succeeded by: Robert Winters

Minister of Reconstruction
- In office 13 October 1944 – 21 December 1945
- Prime Minister: W. L. Mackenzie King
- Preceded by: Office established
- Succeeded by: Office abolished

Minister of Munitions and Supply
- In office 9 April 1940 – 31 December 1945
- Prime Minister: W. L. Mackenzie King
- Preceded by: Office established
- Succeeded by: Office abolished

Minister of Transport
- Acting; 13 May 1942 – 5 October 1942
- Prime Minister: W. L. Mackenzie King
- Preceded by: Arthur Cardin
- Succeeded by: Joseph-Enoil Michaud
- In office 2 November 1936 – 7 July 1940
- Prime Minister: W. L. Mackenzie King
- Preceded by: Office established
- Succeeded by: Arthur Cardin

Minister of Railways and Canals
- In office 23 October 1935 – 1 November 1936
- Prime Minister: W. L. Mackenzie King
- Preceded by: Robert James Manion
- Succeeded by: Office abolished

Minister of Marine
- In office 23 October 1935 – 1 November 1936
- Prime Minister: W. L. Mackenzie King
- Preceded by: Lucien Henri Gendron
- Succeeded by: Office abolished

Member of Parliament for Port Arthur
- In office 14 October 1935 – 10 June 1957
- Preceded by: Riding created
- Succeeded by: Douglas M. Fisher

Personal details
- Born: Clarence Decatur Howe; 15 January 1886 Waltham, Massachusetts, U.S.
- Died: 31 December 1960 (aged 74) Montreal, Quebec, Canada
- Party: Liberal
- Spouse: Alice Worcester (m. 1916)
- Children: 5
- Education: Massachusetts Institute of Technology
- Profession: Legislator; engineer; business leader

Clarence Decatur Howe PC (UK), PC (Can) (15 January 1886 – 31 December 1960) was an American-born Canadian engineer, businessman, and Liberal Party politician. Howe served as a cabinet minister in the governments of William Lyon Mackenzie King and Louis St. Laurent continuously from 1935 to 1957. He is credited with transforming the Canadian economy from agriculture-based to industrial. During the Second World War, his involvement in the war effort was so extensive that he was nicknamed the "Minister of Everything".

Born in Massachusetts, Howe moved to Nova Scotia as a young adult to take up a professorship at Dalhousie University. After working for the Canadian government as an engineer, he began his own firm and became wealthy. In 1935, he was recruited as a Liberal candidate for the House of Commons of Canada by Mackenzie King. The Liberals won the election in a landslide and Howe won his seat. Mackenzie King appointed him to the Cabinet. There, he took major parts in many new enterprises, including the founding of the Canadian Broadcasting Corporation (CBC) and Trans-Canada Air Lines (today Air Canada). Howe played a crucial role in Canada's war effort during the Second World War and recruited many corporate executives (as "dollar-a-year-men") to serve as executives in wartime enterprises.

Howe was impatient with parliamentary debates for his proposals, causing him to struggle with gaining popularity amongst parliamentarians; he was often accused of dictatorial conduct by the Opposition. As the Liberal government entered its third decade, it and Howe came to be seen as arrogant. The Government's attempt to impose closure in the 1956 Pipeline Debate led to major controversy in the House of Commons. In the 1957 election, Howe's actions and policies were made an issue by Opposition leader John Diefenbaker. Howe faced a serious challenge in his riding, but was expected to make speeches elsewhere as a major Liberal leader. Howe lost his seat in the election, and Diefenbaker became Prime Minister, ending almost 22 years of Liberal rule. Howe returned to the private sector, accepting a number of corporate directorships, and died suddenly of a heart attack in December 1960.

== Early years and academic career ==
Howe was born on 15 January 1886 in Waltham, Massachusetts, United States. The Howes were well-regarded in the local community, and William Clarence Howe, Clarence's father, was involved in local politics and descendant of Puritans arriving in 1630s. When not doing political work, William Howe was a carpenter and house builder. Clarence's mother, Mary Emma (née Hastings) was a teacher and the daughter of a prosperous farmer on whose farm Clarence spent his childhood summers. His mother was related to US Navy Commodore Stephen Decatur.

Clarence did well in school and, upon his graduation from Waltham High School in 1903, passed the entrance examinations for the Massachusetts Institute of Technology. He took basic courses at the school and did advanced work in engineering. During the summers, he worked for J. B. Worcester & Co., a firm that constructed much of the Boston subway system. While at school, he became a favourite pupil of Professor George Swain; after Howe graduated in 1907, Swain offered Howe a job as his teaching assistant. Howe accepted, although the young engineer felt that he should leave the Boston area to begin his career. Howe was offered an opportunity to become an engineering professor at Dalhousie University in Halifax, Nova Scotia. Howe accepted the job, partly because unemployment among his classmates was high due to the Panic of 1907.

At the time, Dalhousie was a small university, with only 400 students, and members of the teaching staff had a heavy workload. Howe, at age 23, was little older than some of his students. He had little experience in the field, and on trips outside Halifax, he and his students would solve problems together. Howe's view was that any problem could be solved through common sense and hard work. Howe took his students to the countryside, where they camped, surveying and planning imaginary railroads. His student Denis Stairs, who would go on to lead the Montreal Engineering Company, said of Howe that by the time the camp ended, his students had great respect for him. Student C. J. Mackenzie, who Howe would later appoint to the National Research Council presidency, stated that Howe was not a brilliant lecturer, but that his presentations were always extremely clear. Howe later said of university education, "The worker at college continues to work, and becomes a successful engineer. The shirker continues to shirk, and gets nowhere." In addition to his work, Howe found time for an active social life in Halifax, and considered marrying the sister of one of his students, but she had another husband in mind.

After Howe's first year in Halifax, engineering instruction of upperclassmen was taken away from Dalhousie. Howe later stated that he liked Dalhousie, and had this change not occurred, he might have remained there as a professor. In 1913, a former colleague at Dalhousie, Robert Magill, who had recently been appointed chairman of the Board of Grain Commissioners, offered Howe the post of chief engineer, with responsibility for supervising the construction of grain elevators. Howe stated, "I've never seen one of those things in my life, but I'll take the job." The same year, he applied to become a British subject, as Canadians then were.

== Engineer and businessman ==
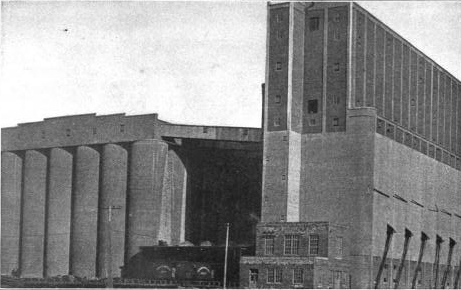
Terminal elevator at Port Arthur, Ontario, built by Howe for the Board of Grain Commissioners

In mid-1913, Howe journeyed to Northwestern Ontario, to take up his new post. The Board was headquartered in Fort William, Ontario, where Canadian wheat was transferred from rail to ship. The Board sought to build a series of large terminal grain elevators, which could process as well as store grain. The project would increase both capacity and competition—grain elevator companies had been accused by farmers' interests of charging excessive prices. The first such elevator for the Board was raised in nearby Port Arthur, Ontario, and was acclaimed as one of the best grain elevators ever built in Canada, and one of the cheapest. Over the next two years, Howe travelled the West, supervising the construction of terminal elevators near major cities and ports. The capacity would be needed, as Canadian farmers increased production during the First World War.

In late 1915, Howe travelled back to Massachusetts to court Alice Worcester, daughter of the head of the company he had worked for in the summer at MIT. After some surprise at the attention of a man she barely knew, Worcester eventually accepted him, and the two were married in mid-1916. The same year, he resigned from government service to go into business with partners as C. D. Howe and Company, whose major business was initially the construction of grain elevators. Both the company headquarters and the marital home were in Port Arthur. Howe's first contract was to build a grain elevator in Port Arthur. In December 1916, a massive storm destroyed the half-built elevator, wiping out Howe's assets. Had his bank not come to his assistance with additional funds, he would have been ruined. When Howe turned over the completed elevator to the owner, the Saskatchewan Grain Growers Association, he was asked how badly he had done on the contract, and stated, "I lost my shirt." The Association voted him a bonus to make up for his loss.

Over the next several years, Howe's business expanded into engineering consulting and, much more profitably, general contracting. His firm dominated the construction of grain elevators in the West, as the Saskatchewan and Alberta wheat pools gave him much of their construction business. This made him unpopular among private wheat companies: his firm did not receive any contracts to build terminal elevators for private corporations in the 1920s, but exceeded the number built by all other contractors combined, thanks to business from those cooperatives. Howe's elevators were built more quickly, were better designed, and were cheaper to construct than those of his competitors. He worked to add to their efficiency; the Dominion-Howe unloader he helped design emptied a grain car in eight minutes, needing only two operators; the same operation had previously taken an hour for a crew of twenty men.

In the early 1920s, Howe turned down several requests to stand for alderman in Port Arthur. He did agree to seek election to the school board in 1921, and headed the polls at his first attempt. He served two two-year terms on the board, spending the final year as its chairman. Early in their marriage, Clarence and Alice Howe had decided to separate their roles, with Alice having full responsibility for their domestic lives. Clarence took no interest in his home life; as an often-absent father he had only a small role in the upbringing of his five children. In the same manner he did not involve his wife in his business (or, later public) life. During his ministerial career, he replied in response to an opposition question hinting at nepotism, "I don't like to discuss my family in public. Members may have noticed that my wife never appears on political platforms."

In October 1929, the firm completed a huge grain elevator, with the capacity of 7,000,000 bushels (246,670 cubic meters), at Port Arthur. The Depression devastated the grain industry, with falling prices and little demand for exported grain. There was no demand for more grain elevators, as the existing elevators contained unsold grain, further driving prices down. Howe's company managed to survive on pre-existing government contracts, but these eventually expired and the staff of 175 had decreased to five by 1933. On the first business day of 1934, Howe's sole remaining partner resigned from the firm. Although Howe remained a wealthy man, his business prospects were few, and he decided to pursue a new career.

== Politics ==
=== Election and prewar ===
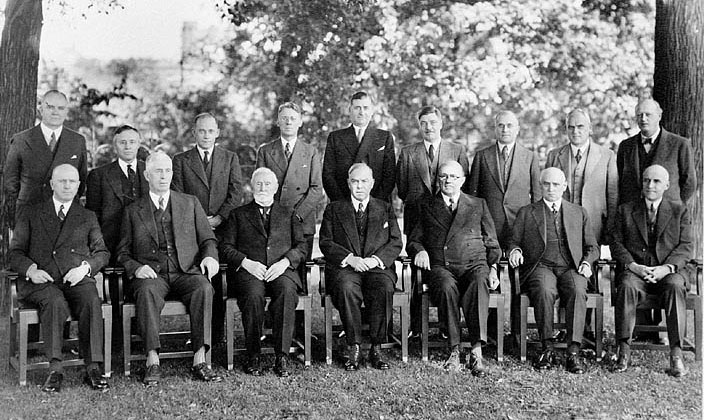
The 1939 Mackenzie King Cabinet; Mackenzie King in centre front row, Howe, second from the right in the rear row

In 1933, the Liberal Party was in opposition and considered Howe as a potential candidate for the House of Commons in the upcoming election. Howe, feeling political activism was bad for business, had not publicly expressed political views. Norman Platt Lambert, a Liberal Party official and friend of Howe, brought him to a meeting with Liberal Party leader William Lyon Mackenzie King on 20 January 1934. The two men were impressed with each other and, according to Lambert in his diary, Howe wanted a guaranteed Cabinet position were he to run in the new riding of Port Arthur. Mackenzie King accepted this deal and on 14 October 1935, Howe was comfortably elected to the Commons from Port Arthur, amassing a majority of 3,784. Across the country, the Liberals won a landslide victory, with 173 seats in the House of Commons to the Conservatives's 40. Mackenzie King appointed Howe to two portfolios: Minister of Railways and Canals and the first Minister of Marine. Howe was the only engineer in Cabinet, which was dominated by lawyers, and was the first engineer to serve in a Liberal government. (Note: Howe's portfolios were combined in late 1936 into the new Ministry of Transport.)

After Parliament assembled in early 1936, Howe sought to have it pass legislation to reform local port authorities. Individual ports were run by Boards of Harbour Commissioners, appointments to which were often politically influenced. A Royal Commission in 1932 had recommended the positions be abolished, and Howe's bill was to establish a National Harbours Board. The debate in the House went smoothly until Howe angered the opposition by declaring that, during Bennett's government, the Conservatives had been corrupt. Despite what became a much more bitter debate, Howe's bill carried. According to Leslie Roberts in his biography of Howe, "This was the Howe the country would soon come to know much better, the Howe on the rampage, the Howe who is impatient of criticism and deplores the debates and delays inherent in the parliamentary system."

Howe worked to place the government-dominated Canadian National Railways (CNR) on a sound financial basis and introduced legislation to form the CNR into a crown corporation. Although the opposition complained that Howe was becoming power-mad, they had little quarrel with the proposed reorganization itself, and it was passed into law. In June 1936, Howe brought in legislation to establish another crown corporation, the Canadian Broadcasting Corporation, which passed into law with little debate or opposition. Howe also worked to increase airline coverage in Canada; in 1936, many Canadians wishing to fly long distances by air would journey through the United States. The Liberals proposed legislation to establish a government-financed corporation, with half the stock to be owned by the CNR and half by the privately owned Canadian Pacific Railway (CPR). The CPR balked at the deal, and the remaining stock was taken up by the CNR and Trans-Canada Air Lines was founded in May 1937. For the rest of his political career, Howe kept Trans-Canada Air Lines in his ministerial portfolio, considering it his "progeny and generally promoted its interests". (Note: Trans-Canada Air Lines changed its name to Air Canada in 1965, and is still in operation.)

=== Second World War ===
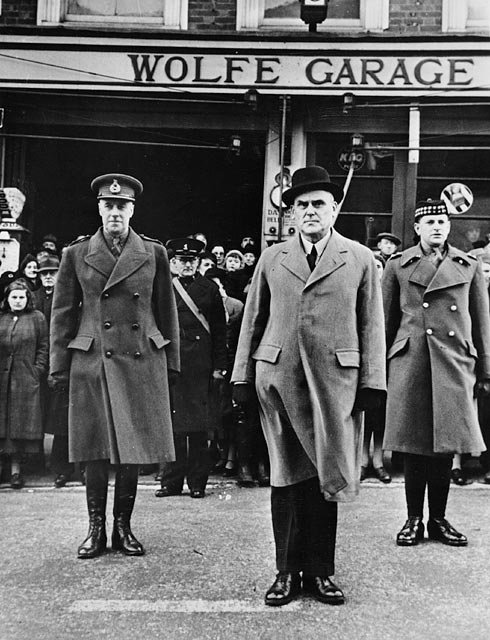
L–R: Major-General G. R. Pearkes, VC and Howe, during memorial service for General James Wolfe, 1 January 1941

On 1 September 1939, Germany invaded Poland, starting WWII. Mackenzie King recalled Parliament into session beginning 7 September; during this session, Canada declared war on Germany and created a Department of Munitions and Supply. It was some months before the department was established; in the meantime Howe supervised the War Purchasing Board. Howe worked to persuade many of his business contacts to work for him or for other government departments. Roberts suggests that no "political minister" could have done that, as many of Howe's recruits were Conservatives. According to historian and author Michael Bliss, "[f]or Howe and other entrepreneurial spirits interested in the creative uses of government power, the war was a kind of ultimate megaproject, a great development job. Money didn't matter, production did."

In the 1940 election, Howe had little trouble being re-elected, and 184 Liberals were returned to Ottawa, the greatest total by any party to that point. Mackenzie King appointed Howe as Minister of Munitions and Supply. Liking his job at Transport, Howe was reluctant to move, but the prime minister persuaded him. The function of the new department was the complete mobilization of all Canadian resources to support the war effort. Howe initially retained the Transport portfolio as well; on 8 July 1940, he turned over responsibility for that portfolio to Arthur Cardin, although Howe retained control of the CBC and Trans-Canada Air Lines.

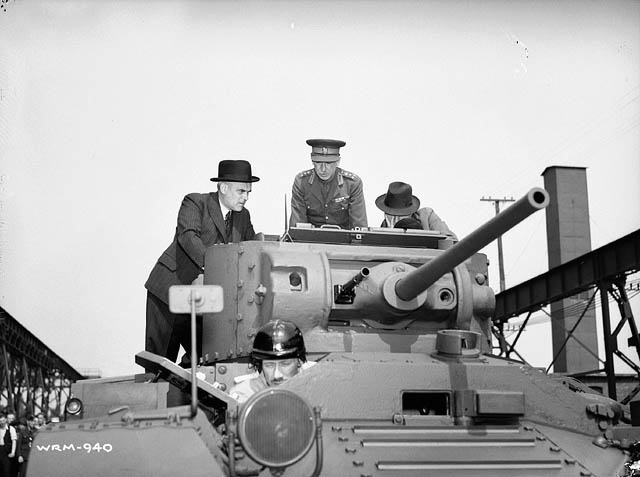
Three men, including the Hon. C. D. Howe and Brigadier Kenneth Stuart, inspecting the first Canadian-built Valentine tank at Angus Shops of the Montreal Locomotive Works (MLW), 27 May 1941

Howe's department was assisted by "dollar-a-year men", top managers in Canadian business loaned to the government by their companies for a token payment of one dollar a year while their firms maintained them on their payrolls. (Note: The "dollar-a-year club was also derisively known as "Howe's Boys". The Order of the British Empire (OBE) was bestowed on 13 of "Howe's Boys" in 1946.) Even before the department was formally established, Howe's representatives were surveying the country for essential war needs, with the department accumulating huge reserves of strategic materials. During the Second World War, Howe established 28 Crown Corporations of various responsibilities, including secret projects and manufacturing the machine tools the rest of Canadian industry needed to continue operations. These corporations were responsible to Howe and Parliament received no word of their activities unless Howe mentioned them.

With Canadian industry reorganized to supply the British war effort, Howe decided he needed to journey to Britain to discuss matters with the customers. He embarked on the S.S. Western Prince in December 1940. This was an intensely dangerous trip; Germany was attempting to blockade Britain and there were many German submarines in the North Atlantic. One of those submarines sank the Western Prince on 14 December. Howe survived the sinking and eight hours in a lifeboat. Gordon Scott, his aide, was killed trying to climb from the lifeboat to the rescuing ship. Howe professed coolness in the incident, but later told the Manchester Guardian that he considered every hour that he lived from that day onwards to be borrowed time.

While on tour of British industrial plants, Howe was shown the Avro Lancaster four-engined heavy bomber, which he subsequently championed for Canadian production. On his return, Howe expropriated the troubled National Steel Car Ltd. plant which was beset with management problems, setting up Victory Aircraft Limited as a Crown corporation, removing the executives and installing J. P. Bickell, one of Howe's "dollar-a-year club" as the new president and chairman of the board. Victory Aircraft recovered its momentum and went on to become one of Howe's greatest industrial successes, producing Avro aircraft under license, including the Lancaster.

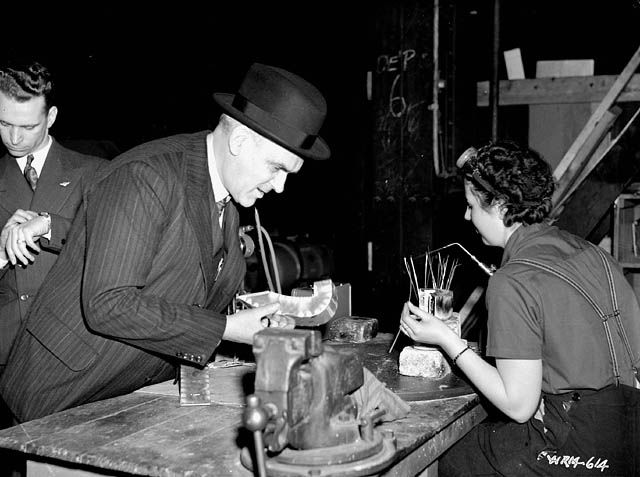
Howe speaking to a worker at an aircraft factory, March 1941

According to Roberts, "What Howe started in 1940 was an Industrial Revolution, so widespread that most Canadians were unaware of its extent or of its penetration into the country's economy." Although there had been increases in production throughout the first three years of the war, the minister's efforts truly bore fruit in 1943, in which Canada had the fourth-highest industrial production among the Allies, trailing only the US, USSR, and Britain. By 1944, Canada had produced over 600 ships for the war effort, 1,100 aircraft, and over half a million cars and trucks, of which 31,000 were armoured. According to Roberts, Howe's actions swung Canada's economy from agriculture-based to industrial, a change that became permanent.

==== "What's a million?" ====
During the debate on Howe's war spending estimates in 1945 (which totalled $1.365 billion), Howe answered an Opposition question on whether such a large sum could be reduced: "I dare say my honourable friend could cut a million dollars from that amount, but a million dollars from the War Appropriations Bill would not be a very important matter." Saskatchewan Tory MP John Diefenbaker spoke the following day, and alleged that Howe had said, "We may save a million dollars, but what of it?" Howe angrily denied the quote, accusing Diefenbaker of being "a past master of distortion"—language he was forced to withdraw as unparliamentary. Diefenbaker sharpened the anecdote over time, and it emerged in its final form as Howe saying, "What's a million?" Even Liberals who knew that Howe had made no such statement agreed that it was just the sort of thing he could have said. In the years to come, "What's a million?" would be a mocking Tory attack on the Liberals, most often directed at Howe.

=== Postwar ===
==== Mackenzie King years ====
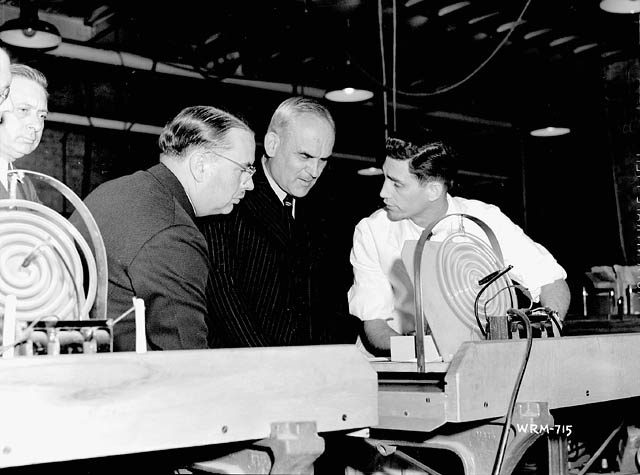
Howe watches a scientist test the curve of a lens by interference fringes at the Instruments Division in the Canadian Arsenals Ltd. optical plant.

In October 1944, Mackenzie King appointed Howe Minister of Reconstruction. Howe had an excellent reputation for his successful overhaul of the Canadian economy, and Mackenzie King feared he would return to the private sector to amass another fortune in business. Among those who urged Howe to remain was the Minister of Justice, Louis St. Laurent, with whom Howe forged a strong relationship. The prime minister obtained a dissolution of Parliament in April 1945 and in the ensuing election, the Liberals obtained a bare majority. Howe was intensively involved in Liberal fundraising, and campaigned nationally for its candidates. He was easily returned in Port Arthur, taking just over half of all votes cast, with the Co-operative Commonwealth Federation (the predecessor of the New Democratic Party) a distant second.

Howe favoured a quick transition to a peacetime economy. Most industries in which there were no shortages were released from government controls in late 1945. Labour leaders, fearing unemployment, wanted to keep wartime government plants in production; Howe opposed such proposals. When union members who were laid off from the Research Enterprises Limited (R.E.L.) confronted Howe on a golf course, the minister stated, "R.E.L. was a war-time plant. The war is through, the plant is through, and your union... what happens to your union is up to you. Get the hell off of the course." In disposing of redundant government property, Howe found that saddles and harnesses had been stored since the end of the Boer War and men had been employed to safeguard and polish them for over 40 years. He strove to eliminate such anachronisms. However, Howe was slower to release economic controls. According to Roberts, "although he worked to return the country's economic power to private hands, he often seemed as loath to surrender his own dictatorial powers over it as he was to submit to Parliament". In November 1945, Howe's wartime portfolio was merged into his new responsibility to form the Department of Reconstruction and Supply.

Howe was determined to support technologically advanced industries and wanted Canada to continue the production of aircraft after the war. His Director-General for Aircraft Production, Ralph Bell, disagreed with him, noting that Canada had no aircraft engine manufacturer and that despite the presence of manufacturing plants and skilled workers, there was no guarantee that they could sell their products. Howe took steps to keep aircraft manufacturers in business, allowing the British Hawker Siddeley Group to take over Victory Aircraft as A.V. Roe Canada (Avro Canada), while Canadair was sold to the US-based Electric Boat Company (later General Dynamics).

After the war, Mackenzie King recommended to the British government that two Cabinet ministers be appointed to the Imperial Privy Council, but not Howe. When the honours were announced on New Year's Day 1946, Howe told the prime minister that he felt his war service was being slighted and threatened his resignation. Mackenzie King arranged for Howe to receive the honour in June. This created more ill feelings among other members of the Cabinet; two more were elevated in the 1947 New Year's Honours, after which the prime minister refused to consider any more.

In February 1947, Mackenzie King fell ill with pneumonia and, after recovering, spent a month on vacation in the United States, with St. Laurent (by then Secretary of State for External Affairs) as acting prime minister. In July, Minister of National Defence Brooke Claxton warned Mackenzie King that the issue of the prime minister's age and the uncertainty of the succession was causing political difficulties for the Liberals. Mackenzie King consulted Howe, who bluntly stated that it was best that Mackenzie King resign while still retaining his full faculties and before a crisis erupted. After the talk, the prime minister decided that he should retire within a year and that St. Laurent, who had recently threatened to leave Cabinet and return home to Quebec, should be the successor. Howe was among those who persuaded St. Laurent not to resign. He also helped persuade St. Laurent to stand for the leadership, offering to remain in Cabinet to assist him following his withdrawal.

==== St. Laurent government's first mandate ====
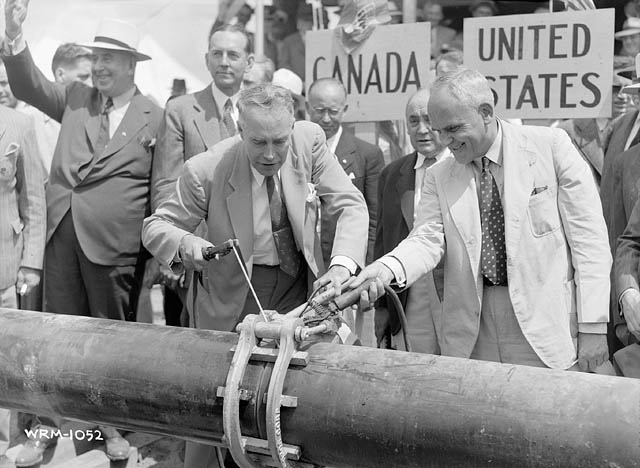
Howe and Vermont Governor William H. Wills join the US and Canadian segments of an oil pipeline.

On 20 January 1948, Mackenzie King announced his intent to resign and a Cabinet reshuffle; both St. Laurent and Howe convinced the prime minister to move Howe, who had not enjoyed his work at the Ministry of Reconstruction and Supply, to become Minister of Trade and Commerce. Howe publicly announced that he was "not available" to stand for the leadership and that he was supporting St. Laurent. The Quebecer was elected Leader of the Liberal Party in August, and Mackenzie King resigned on 15 November.

In October 1948, the Progressive Conservatives also elected a new leader, Ontario Premier George A. Drew. St. Laurent called an election for June 1949, and Howe again was successful in fundraising from corporate backers, including CPR and Eaton's. Drew had used Howe's record as an election issue, accusing him of being power-mad and selling off Crown Corporations for bargain prices, but the allegations got little traction. According to Howe, the only result of Drew's attacks "was to give me a record majority in Port Arthur!" The Liberals won a huge victory, taking 190 seats to 40 for the Tories, and Howe again won Port Arthur easily.

In early 1950, St. Laurent considered recommending the appointment of Howe as governor general. The governor general had previously been a British peer; many nationalists wanted a Canadian to hold the post, and St. Laurent agreed. The governor general, The Viscount Alexander, was due to retire by 1953. St. Laurent saw this as a way of allowing his friend and colleague to step away from politics for a quieter life. The minister was willing to take the post, but the position unexpectedly opened early when Alexander was appointed to the British Cabinet. Howe decided he still had work to do as a minister and was reluctant to exchange real power for the nominal power of the governor generalship. St. Laurent recommended the appointment of Canadian-born Vincent Massey, who was duly appointed by King George VI.

Canada entered the Korean War in 1950. Howe saw it as the wrong war in the wrong place, and thought that Canadian troops should not be sent. Nevertheless, he spent the summer of 1950 at his desk, making plans to implement government controls on the booming economy. In September 1950, Howe tabled a bill allowing him to reallocate scarce materials such as steel from the civilian sector to military use. The bill passed, but not before the Opposition had charged that Howe had "an enormous appetite for power". Late in the year, the Government decided on a massive rearmament program. The Canadian Commercial Corporation, the Crown Corporation which handled government purchases, was felt to be inadequate for the task, so the Cabinet decided on a new department to handle procurement. St. Laurent introduced a bill in February 1951 creating a Department of Defence Production and announced that on passage, Howe would add that responsibility to his portfolio. The opposition parties objected to the Defence Production Act, stating that there was no emergency justifying the powers Howe wanted. According to Roberts, Howe sought to implement rearmament by getting "full power for himself and running rights over everyone and everything to get an urgent job done". Backed by the overwhelming Liberal majority, the bill passed and the department was established on 1 April 1951.

Despite Avro Canada's success in producing the CF-100, Canada's first jet fighter for the Royal Canadian Air Force (RCAF), aircraft development had proven to be a time-consuming and expensive process. The projected next generation aircraft, Canada's first supersonic jet interceptor, the CF-105 Arrow, was a more daunting project in terms of financial commitment and a leap in technological prowess. Howe wrote in a letter to Defence Minister Claxton in 1952 that "I am frightened for the first time in my defence production experience."

St. Laurent's supervision of his ministers was minimal at the start of his tenure, and decreased as the years passed. With the Opposition few in numbers, ministers did as they wanted, and when Howe was accused by Tory MP Howard Green in 1951 of being willing to end tariffs if the people would let him, Howe replied, "Who would stop us? Don't take yourself too seriously. If we wanted to get away with it, who would stop us?"

The government spent much of early 1953 in enacting the remainder of its legislative program. St. Laurent scheduled an election for 10 August; Drew attempted to exploit a Defence Ministry scandal at the Petawawa, Ontario army base, where an investigation earlier in the year had found frauds which included placing horses on the payroll. The Liberals lost 20 seats from their 1949 high-water mark, but still constituted almost two-thirds of the House of Commons, and no minister was defeated. Howe was again easily elected for Port Arthur.

==== St. Laurent government's second mandate ====
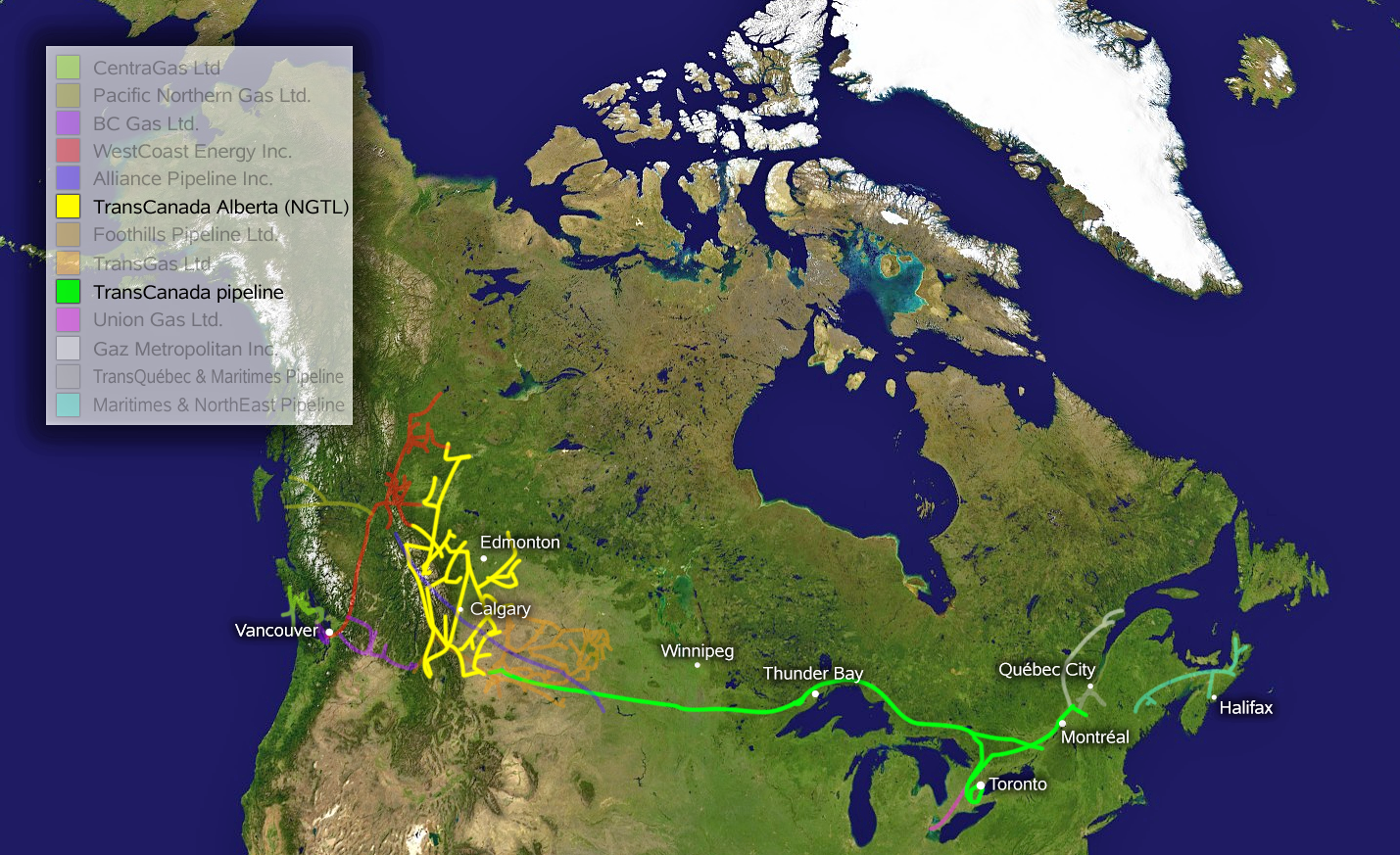
Map showing the Trans-Canada pipeline (in green)

Beginning in 1954, Howe planned for pipelines to take Alberta's natural gas to market. There were US-backed proposals to build pipelines directly to the United States; Howe wanted a route passing north of the Great Lakes which could supply Toronto and Montreal. Two rival groups contended for the approval which Howe had the power to grant; Howe forced the groups to work together on the route he wanted.

In March 1955, St. Laurent tabled legislation to make the Department of Defence Production permanent and extend the extraordinary powers of the Minister. Fearful of another damaging confrontation between Howe and the Opposition, the Cabinet agreed that St. Laurent would guide the bill through, but after the first day of debate St. Laurent, who was prone to depression, absented himself. Tory frontbencher Donald Fleming contended that the extension could make the minister "the virtual dictator of the economy". With St. Laurent absent (or when present, silent), Howe took charge of the bill, and according to his biographers, Robert Bothwell and William Kilbourn, "utterly failed to perceive that the bill and his manner of defending it were a godsend to the opposition". When Howe alluded to the Avro Arrow project and that he "was out on a limb for $30 million", which gave him "the shudders", the Opposition met the statement with jeers and cries of "What's a million?" In early July, Howe left town for a long weekend, after asking St. Laurent and Minister of Finance Walter Harris to maintain his stand while he was gone, although he gave Harris the authority to do as he saw fit. Without informing Howe, St. Laurent contacted Drew, and the two men agreed that the minister's powers would expire in 1959 unless sooner renewed. The amended bill passed the Commons in Howe's absence, and when he returned, he furiously accused Harris of making a deal behind his back. However, when Howe was told that it had been the prime minister's decision, he accepted it. Howe had earlier turned down an Opposition offer to agree to a three-year extension of his ministerial powers, saying "That would mean coming back to Parliament in three years, and I've more to do with my time than amusing Parliament." The extension was allowed to expire in 1959, although by then, Howe had left office.

The pipeline project was wracked with financing difficulties. The pipeline company wanted the Government to guarantee the loans needed to build what would become known as the Trans-Canada Pipeline, but Cabinet refused, fearful of the political implications of giving a large sum of government money to a US-dominated corporation. Howe was embittered by this decision, and grumbled that he was now part of "a government which has fallen into the hands of children". A solution was proposed by Howe's deputy minister, Mitchell Sharp: the Government and the province of Ontario would themselves build the most expensive part of the route, in Northern Ontario, to be reimbursed by Trans-Canada once the pipeline was open for business. This was approved by both governments. By 1956, however, further difficulties had arisen: until the US government granted formal approval for a part of the route which connected to US pipelines, Trans-Canada could not raise enough money to build its portion. The approval was a matter of routine, but the delay would mean that construction on the pipeline could not begin until the spring of 1957.

Howe was determined that the pipeline not be delayed, and proposed that the government advance money to the pipeline company to ensure construction in 1956. He emotionally pleaded with his Cabinet colleagues, who agreed with both to the proposal and to the use of rarely used closure to limit the debate. Closure had not been applied in the House since 1932. The issue was attractive to the Tories and CCF with an election due within two years; it would allow them to portray Howe as an arrogant dictator, and play to those citizens who disliked the American involvement in the pipeline project. If the bill did not receive Royal Assent by 7 June 1956, options that Trans-Canada held for steel pipe would expire.

Bothwell and Kilbourn describe Howe's speech opening the Pipeline Debate as "probably the best of his career". He told the Commons that waiting a year would be imprudent, given the worldwide shortage of steel pipe, and unfair to those who owned natural gas wells in western Canada, which were presently capped. Howe told the House he believed this to be a great project, "of truly national scope, which we must either launch now or see languish for years to come." He completed his address by giving notice that the following day, the Government intended to invoke closure. Social Credit, with many members from Alberta, supported the bill, while the Tories and CCF engaged in weeks of bitter debate and parliamentary wrangling. This culminated on 1 June, dubbed by the Tories "Black Friday", when Speaker René Beaudoin reversed a ruling he had made the previous evening which would have allowed the Opposition to continue the debate past the deadline. The Opposition accused the Speaker of yielding to Government pressure. The bill passed within the deadline, and construction on the pipeline began immediately. Howe wrote, "I should not like to face a general election at this moment. Fortunately we do not have to."

In mid-1956, Drew fell ill and resigned as Tory party leader. The leadership convention's choice of Diefenbaker as Drew's replacement prompted delight in some Liberal circles. Diefenbaker had long been a maverick within his party, was little known in eastern Canada, and many deemed him unelectable. Although Defence Minister Claxton and the RCAF remained firm supporters of the Arrow program as costs continued to rise, in 1957 the Cabinet's defence committee proposed elimination of the Arrow, a decision that was to be reviewed after the forthcoming election and which was supported by Howe.

==== 1957 election ====
After the election was called in April 1957 for 10 June, Howe raised sufficient money to enable the Liberals to heavily outspend their opponents. As there were few Liberal ministers from western Canada, Howe was called upon to make appearances throughout the region. He found that the Manitoba Farmers Union was organizing opposition to the Liberals; at some meetings Howe had difficulty getting heard at all. At other meetings, Howe engaged in well publicised conflicts with audience members. On 19 May in Morris, Manitoba, Howe told one man demanding to speak that when his own party held a meeting, he could ask all the questions he wanted; the man was the head of a local Liberal association. When asked why he did not answer Mackenzie's question, Howe replied, "Look here, my good man, when the election comes, why don't you go away and vote for the party you support? In fact, why don't you just go away?" At another meeting, Howe was asked why he did not care about the farmers's economic plight. He responded, "Looks like you've been eating pretty well under a Liberal government" and poked the questioner in the midsection.

Diefenbaker used the Pipeline Debate as a major theme in the campaign, one which he mentioned more than any other issue. In Vancouver, he told the largest political crowd in the province since 1935, "I give this assurance to Canadians—that the government shall be the servant and not the master of the people ... The road of the Liberal party, unless it is stopped—and Howe has said, 'Who's going to stop us?'—will lead to the virtual extinction of parliamentary government. You will have the form, but the substance will be gone."

Howe was opposed in his riding by CCF candidate Doug Fisher, a local high school teacher. Fisher's campaign was well financed, with support from his party, the unions, and a number of corporate enemies Howe had made throughout his political career. Fisher was able to buy up the key time on the local television station to explain his opposition to the Liberals and his party's proposals—Howe initially scheduled no television appearances. Called back to his riding after the remainder of his disastrous Prairie tour was cancelled, Howe found that Fisher's appeals had caused defections among Liberals. Howe managed to get TV time just before the election and according to Bothwell and Kilbourn "treated his viewers to the sight of a tired, harsh old man, telling them that the nice young fellow that they had been seeing on television for the last couple of months was, if not a communist himself, then associated with the communists. No one believed him." Fisher defeated Howe by over a thousand votes. Howe was gracious in defeat, shaking Fisher's hand at the television station, and assuring the member-elect's mother, long a Howe admirer, that there were many things for him to do. In the general election, the Tories took the greater number of seats, 112 to 105 for the Liberals. St. Laurent could have remained in office until Diefenbaker and the Tories defeated him in the House, but chose not to—a course with which Howe agreed. The Liberals left office on 21 June 1957, with Howe the only remaining minister of those sworn in with Mackenzie King in 1935.

== Later life, death, and legacy ==
Howe returned to Ottawa after his defeat, cleared his office, and soon sold his house there, moving to Montreal. After St. Laurent announced his retirement in September, Howe wrote to the former Prime Minister, "The young men of the party must take on the job of reorganising and rebuilding, and perhaps the sooner they get at it the better." While publicly taking no position, Howe privately supported former External Affairs Minister Pearson for the Liberal leadership, and Pearson won the contest in January 1958. Howe advised Pearson not to take any action that might provoke an election. Pearson did not heed Howe and challenged Diefenbaker as soon as Parliament met. The election on 31 March returned the Progressive Conservatives in a record landslide, which left the Liberals with 48 seats. Howe, who took no part in the campaign, had already left for Europe with his wife, Alice, on an extended holiday. On his return, he did what he could to help rebuild the Liberal Party after the disaster, assisting with fundraising and seeking to unite factions within the party.

After some hesitancy that was likely caused by fears the newly empowered Tories would resent any approach to their longtime enemy, major corporations began to approach Howe and ask for him to serve on their boards of directors. In 1958, Howe was made chancellor of Dalhousie University. On investigating the university's finances, he found that a professor's salary in 1958 had less buying power than when he had worked there. Howe urged increased salaries and building improvements to attract first-rate scholars to the university. He also accepted a number of honorary degrees from other universities.

Howe had a longtime heart condition, and friends urged him to give up all boards that did not meet in Montreal. Before he could act on this suggestion, Howe suffered a heart attack and died at his home on 31 December 1960.

Prime Minister Diefenbaker said after Howe died, "We often had strong differences but our personal relations remained most friendly at all times ... He gave his great ability, indomitable courage and energy to his country in a manner that has earned for him and will assure him of a large place in the history of Canada's war effort." Opposition Leader Pearson stated, "He was a man who shirked no duty, faltered in no task, was daunted by no obstacle. He got things done, and they were good things for the country he served so well and so long." At his memorial service, enemies and friend alike gathered. Among the eulogies delivered by friends and colleagues at Christ Church Cathedral in Montreal, it was remarked that Howe often stated proudly that he was "an American by birth but Canadian by choice".

Howe had five children:

- William (Bill) Hastings Howe
- John Howe
- Barbara Stewart Marshall
- Mary Dodge
- Elisabeth Howe Stedman

== Namesakes ==
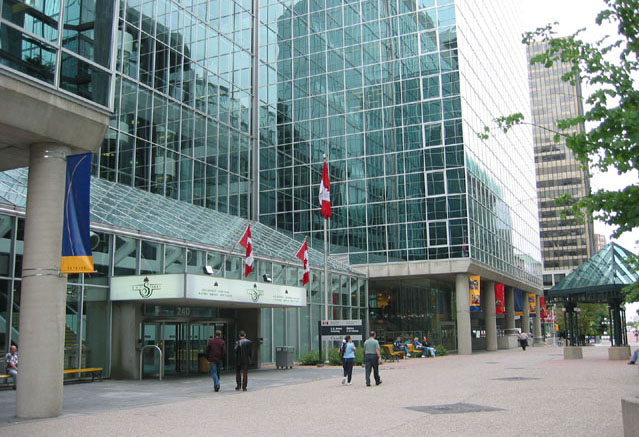
The C. D. Howe Building in Ottawa houses Industry Canada.

After Howe's death, the C. D. Howe Memorial Foundation was created in his memory; the C. D. Howe Institute, a Canadian economic policy think tank was at one time associated with the Memorial Foundation. The Canadian Aeronautics and Space Institute (CASI) introduced the C. D. Howe Award for achievements in the fields of planning and policymaking, and overall leadership in the field. In 1976, Howe was inducted into Canada's Aviation Hall of Fame, in honour of his contribution to creating a national airline and efforts to create and sustain a viable aviation industry. The C. D. Howe Building, located at Bank and Sparks Street in Ottawa, is the home of Industry Canada and is named for the former minister, as is a public school in Thunder Bay in the Lakehead District School Board, and a residence building at Dalhousie University, under the name Howe Hall, opened in 1959. The former Department of Transport and Canadian Coast Guard vessel CGS C.D. Howe was named for him.

Political offices
Preceded by Robert James Manion	Minister of Railways and Canals; 1935–1936	Office abolished
Academic offices
New office	Chancellor of Dalhousie University; 1957–1960	Vacant Title next held by Marcia Anastasia Christoforides
