= Department of Industry and Commerce (1975–1982) =

Australian government department, 1975–1982

Department overview
- Formed: 22 December 1975
- Preceding Department: Department of Tourism and Recreation – for tourism Department of Transport (III) – for shipbuilding Department of Manufacturing Industry
- Dissolved: 7 May 1982
- Superseding Department: Department of Defence Support Department of Industry and Commerce (II)
- Jurisdiction: Commonwealth of Australia
- Headquarters: Barton, Canberra
- Ministers responsible: Bob Cotton, Minister (1975–1977); Phillip Lynch, Minister (1977–1982)
- Department executive: Neil Currie, Secretary

The Department of Industry and Commerce was an Australian government department that existed between December 1975 and May 1982.

== Scope ==
Information about the department's functions and government funding allocation could be found in the Administrative Arrangements Orders, the annual Portfolio Budget Statements and in the Department's annual reports.

At its creation, the Department dealt with:

- The efficiency and development of manufacturing and tertiary industries and research relating thereto
- Adjustment assistance to industry
- Assistance to small business
- Manufacture of goods and provision of services
- Shipbuilding

== Structure ==
The Department was an Australian Public Service department, staffed by officials who were responsible to the Minister for Industry and Commerce.
