= Alan Woods (public servant) =

Australian public servant

Alan Woods AC

Secretary of the Department of Defence
- In office 14 November 1986 – 31 July 1988

Secretary of the Department of Resources and Energy
- In office 11 March 1983 – 1986

Secretary of the Department of National Development and Energy
- In office 8 December 1979 – 11 March 1983

Secretary of the Department of National Development
- In office 20 December 1977 – 8 December 1979

Personal details
- Born: Alan John Woods; 30 March 1930 Woonona, New South Wales
- Died: 13 January 1990 (aged 59) Canberra
- Cause of death: Cancer
- Resting place: Gungahlin Cemetery
- Spouse: Anne Therese Flynn
- Children: 4 daughters and 3 sons
- Occupation: Public servant

Alan John Woods AC (30 March 1930 – 13 January 1990) was a senior Australian public servant.

== Life and career ==
Woods was born in Woonona, New South Wales on 30 March 1930 to parents Oswald and Gladys May Woods. After attending St Joseph's College, Hunters Hill on a scholarship, he obtained a Bachelor of Economics from the University of Sydney in 1955 while working as an executive trainee for Dunlop Rubber Australia Ltd.

Woods began his Commonwealth Public Sector career at the Commonwealth Public Service Board in Sydney in 1955. He moved to Canberra in 1957, taking a research officer post in the Department of Territories.

In December 1977, Woods was appointed Secretary of the Department of National Development (later abolished and replaced by the Department of National Development and Energy, and then the Department of Resources and Energy).

Woods was appointed Secretary of the Department of Defence in 1986, but was replaced in a reshuffle of department heads in mid-1988.

== Awards and recognition ==
Woods was made an Officer of the Order of Australia in the 1985 Australia Day Honours for "public service, particularly as Secretary to the Department of Resources and Energy". In the 1989 Australia Day Honours he was promoted to Companion of the Order of Australia "for public service, particularly as Secretary to the Department of Defence".

== Death ==
Woods became ill with cancer in the later part of 1989. He died of the disease on 13 January 1990 in Canberra.

== References and further reading ==
- Nethercote, J.R. (2012), Woods, Alan John (1930–1990), National Centre of Biography, Australian National University, archived from the original on 6 November 2013
- Search Australian Honours: WOODS, Alan John, Australian Government, archived from the original on 30 October 2018

Government offices
| Preceded by Jim Scully as Secretary of the Department of National Resources | Secretary of the Department of National Development; 1977–1979 | Succeeded by Himself as Secretary of the Department of National Development and Energy |
| Preceded by Himself as Secretary of the Department of National Development | Secretary of the Department of National Development and Energy; 1979–1983 | Succeeded by Himself as Secretary of the Department of Resources and Energy |
| Preceded by Himself as Secretary of the Department of National Development and Energy | Secretary of the Department of Resources and Energy; 1983–1986 | Succeeded by Graham Evans |
| Preceded by Jim Scully as Secretary of the Department of Trade and Resources | Secretary of the Department of Resources and Energy; 1983–1986 | Succeeded by Graham Evans |
| Preceded by William Cole | Secretary of the Department of Defence; 1986–1988 | Succeeded by Tony Ayers |
