= Harold Breen =

Australian public servant

Harold Breen CBE

Secretary of the Department of Supply and Development
- In office 31 July 1949 – 16 March 1950

Secretary of the Department of Supply
- In office 17 March 1950 – 10 May 1951

Secretary of the Department of Defence Production
- In office 11 May 1951 – 8 August 1957

Personal details
- Born: Harold Patrick Breen; 30 April 1893 Richmond, Melbourne
- Died: 6 July 1966 (aged 73) Malvern, Melbourne
- Resting place: St Kilda Cemetery
- Spouse(s): Agnes Rose O'Sullivan (m. 1916–1923; her death); Rosa Marguerita Maree Carrodus (m. 1930–1934; her death); Constance Jessie Gillespie (m. 1957–1966; his death)
- Occupation: Public servant

Harold Patrick Breen CBE (30 April 1893 – 6 July 1966) was a senior Australian public servant. He was head of the Department of Defence Production between 1951 and 1957.

== Life and career ==
Harold Breen was born on 30 April 1893 in Richmond, Melbourne.

He commenced his Commonwealth Public Service career in 1910 in the Department of Defence in the Ordnance Department.

Rising up the ranks, he was appointed Secretary of the Department of Supply and Development in July 1949, and later head of the Department of Supply in 1950.

When the Department of Defence Production was established in 1951, Breen was appointed as its inaugural head. He remained in the position until his retirement in 1957.

Breen died in Malvern on 6 July 1966 and was buried in St Kilda Cemetery.

== Awards ==
Breen was appointed a Commander of the Order of the British Empire in June 1953 during his time as head of the Defence Production Department.

Government offices
Preceded by John Jensen	Secretary of the Department of Supply and Development; 1949 – 1950	Succeeded by Charles Hector McFadyen as Secretary of the Department of Fuel, Shipping and Transport
Preceded by John Jensen	Secretary of the Department of Supply and Development; 1949 – 1950	Succeeded by Robert Jackson as Secretary of the Department of National Development
Preceded by John Jensen	Secretary of the Department of Supply and Development; 1949 – 1950	Succeeded by Himself as Secretary of the Department of Supply
Preceded by Himself as Secretary of the Department of Supply and Development	Secretary of the Department of Supply; 1950 – 1951	Succeeded by Jack Stevens
Preceded by Himself as Secretary of the Department of Supply and Development	Secretary of the Department of Supply; 1950 – 1951	Succeeded by Himself as Secretary of the Department of Defence Production
Preceded by Himself as Secretary of the Department of Supply	Secretary of the Department of Defence Production; 1951–1957	Succeeded by John Knott
