= Alan Cooley =

Sir Alan Cooley CBE

Secretary of the Department of Supply
- In office 1966–1971

Secretary of the Department of Productivity
- In office 1977–1980

Personal details
- Born: Alan Sydenham Cooley; 17 September 1920
- Died: 13 April 1997 (aged 76)
- Occupation: Public servant

Sir Alan Sydenham Cooley, CBE (17 September 1920 – 13 April 1997) was a senior Australian Public Service official and policymaker.

== Life and career ==
Alan Cooley was born in 1920.

He began his Commonwealth Public Service career in the Department of Supply, rising up the ranks to become Secretary of that department in 1966. He transferred the department headquarters to Canberra in January 1968.

Between 1971 and 1977, Cooley was Chairman of the Public Service Board. In 1977, he was appointed to be Secretary of the new Department of Productivity.

== Awards ==
Cooley was made a Commander of the Order of the British Empire in January 1972. He was appointed a Knight Bachelor in June 1976.

In 2011, a street in the Canberra suburb of Casey was named Cooley Crescent in Alan Cooley's honour.

Government offices
Preceded by John Knott	Secretary of the Department of Supply; 1966–1971	Succeeded by Neil Currie
Preceded by Frederick Wheeler	Chairman of the Public Service Board; 1971–1977	Succeeded by Mick Shann
Preceded by D.J. O'Connor (Acting)	Secretary of the Department of Productivity; 1977–1980	Succeeded by Hugh Ryan (Acting)
