= Peter Walsh (Australian politician) =

Australian politician

The Honourable Peter Walsh AO
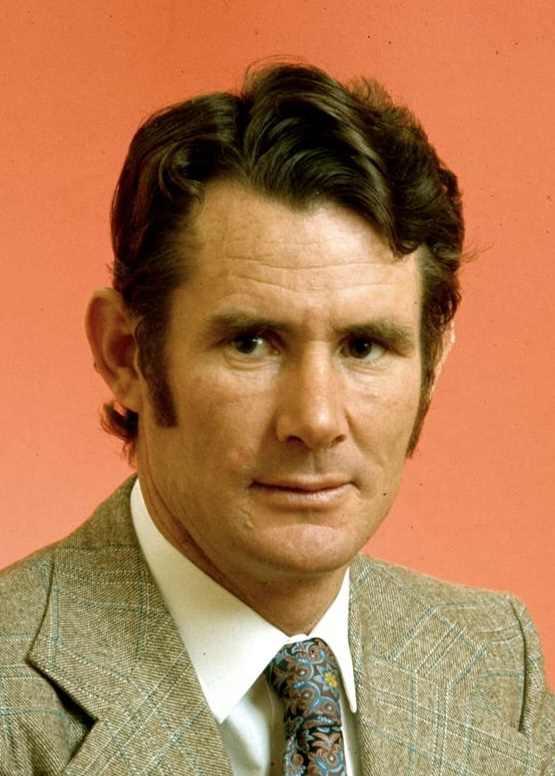
- Walsh in 1974

Minister for Finance
- In office 13 December 1984 – 4 April 1990
- Prime Minister: Bob Hawke
- Preceded by: John Dawkins
- Succeeded by: Ralph Willis

Minister for Resources and Energy
- In office 11 March 1983 – 13 December 1984
- Prime Minister: Bob Hawke
- Preceded by: Doug Anthony (Resources); John Carrick (Energy)
- Succeeded by: Gareth Evans

Senator for Western Australia
- In office 18 May 1974 – 30 June 1993

Personal details
- Born: 11 March 1935 Kellerberrin, Western Australia
- Died: 10 April 2015 (aged 80) Perth, Western Australia
- Party: Australian Labor Party
- Occupation: Farmer and grazier

Peter Alexander Walsh AO (11 March 1935 – 10 April 2015) was an Australian politician. He was a Senator for Western Australia from 1974 to 1993, representing the Australian Labor Party (ALP). He held senior ministerial office in the Hawke government, serving as Minister for Resources and Energy (1983–1984) and Minister for Finance (1984–1990).

== Early life ==
Walsh was born on 11 March 1935 in Kellerberrin, Western Australia, the second son of Dorothy (née Ray) and Robert Walsh. His parents had moved from Victoria a few years earlier to take up a lease on a sheep and wheat farm at Doodlakine in the Wheatbelt.

Walsh attended Doodlakine Primary School and completed his junior certificate by correspondence, leaving school in 1948 at the age of 13 to work on the family farm. He was active in the Junior Farmers' Federation and the Farmers' Union of Western Australia. In 1950 Walsh led the Doodlakine debating team to victory at the state championship. He enrolled in the University of Western Australia in the late 1960s as an external student in economics, although he did not complete a degree.

== Politics ==
=== Early involvement ===
Walsh became interested in politics as a teenager, as an admirer of ALP prime minister Ben Chifley. He joined the ALP in 1961 and helped revive the inactive Kellerberrin branch, serving as secretary from 1966 to 1974. He was the principal author of a new agricultural policy for the state party, which was adopted in 1970.

At the 1969 and 1972 federal elections, Walsh stood unsuccessfully for the House of Representatives in the seat of Moore, losing to incumbent Country Party MP Don Maisey on both occasions.

=== Senate ===
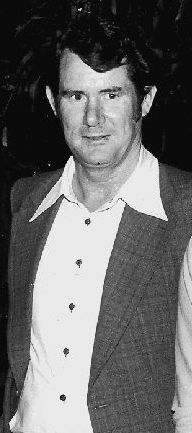
Walsh in 1979

Walsh was elected to the Senate at the 1974 federal election, having won ALP preselection with the supporter of influential state secretary Joe Chamberlain. He was re-elected on four further occasions, heading Labor's Senate ticket in Western Australia at the 1977, 1983 and 1987 elections.

Walsh was initially a member of the Labor Left faction, but was expelled in 1975 after supporting Gough Whitlam's removal of Treasurer Jim Cairns. He joined the new Centre Left faction upon its creation in 1984.

=== Hawke government ===
Walsh served as Minister for Resources and Energy from 1983 to 1984 and Finance Minister from 1984 to 1990. He was noted for his pro-free market views, and was identified with the economic rationalism strain within the ALP.

In his 1995 memoirs, Confessions of a Failed Finance Minister, Walsh was critical of his colleagues and of political processes in general for failing to curb what he saw as wasteful government expenditure, and unnecessary government intervention. Also, in his book he corrected errors made in Whatever It Takes, the book written by former ministerial colleague and fellow Senator Graham Richardson.

== Later life ==
After leaving politics, Walsh was a columnist for the Australian Financial Review and was particularly critical of environmentalism. He was one of the founders of the Lavoisier Group which opposes the Kyoto Protocol on global warming. Walsh also expressed criticism over the Rudd government's National Broadband Network scheme.

Walsh died at a hospital in Perth after a short illness on 10 April 2015.

In his tribute to him, sitting Liberal Finance Minister and another WA Senator Mathias Cormann described his predecessor as "a real pillar of the Hawke Government".

== Bibliography ==
- Walsh, Peter (1995). Confessions of a failed finance minister. Milsons Point, NSW: Random House Australia.
- — (October 1997). "Labor and the constitution : forty years on" (PDF). Proceedings of the Samuel Griffith Society. 9.
- — (July–August 2003). "A please to Quadrant readers". Quadrant. 47 (7–8 [398]): 50–51.

== Notes ==
Political offices
Preceded by Doug Anthony as Minister for Trade and Resources	Minister for Resources and Energy; 1983–1984	Succeeded by Gareth Evans
Preceded by John Carrick as Minister for National Development and Energy	Minister for Resources and Energy; 1983–1984	Succeeded by Gareth Evans
Preceded by John Dawkins	Minister for Finance; 1984–1990	Succeeded by Ralph Willis
