= Frank O'Connor (public servant) =

Australian public servant

Frank O'Connor CBE

Secretary of the Department of Supply and Shipping
- In office 5 September 1946 – 29 July 1948

Secretary of the Department of Supply
- In office 1953–1959

Personal details
- Born: Francis Alexander O'Connor; 13 October 1894 Leongatha, Victoria
- Died: 16 April 1972 (aged 77) Fitzroy, Melbourne, Victoria
- Resting place: Box Hill Cemetery
- Spouse(s): Annie Morrison Nunan (m. 1925–1972; his death)
- Occupation: Public servant

Francis Alexander O'Connor CBE (13 October 1894 – 16 April 1972) was a senior Australian public servant. He was Secretary of the Department of Supply and Shipping (1946–1948) and later the Department of Supply (1953–1959).

== Life and career ==
O'Connor was born in Leongatha, Victoria on 13 October 1894.

O'Connor was appointed Secretary of the Department of Supply and Shipping in September 1946. In 1948, when there was a departmental reorganization, his position was reverted to first assistant secretary.

He was appointed Secretary again in April 1953, the Department was by then known as the Department of Supply. O'Connor retired from the Australian Public Service in 1959.

On 16 April 1972, O'Connor died in Fitzroy, Melbourne aged 77.

== Awards ==
In 1953, O'Connor was made an Officer of the Order of the British Empire He was elevated to a Commander of the Order in June 1957, in recognition of his outstanding public service.

Government offices
Preceded by Giles Chippindall	Secretary of the Department of Supply and Shipping; 1946 – 1948	Succeeded by John Jensen as Secretary of the Department of Supply and Development
Preceded by Giles Chippindall	Secretary of the Department of Supply and Shipping; 1946 – 1948	Succeeded by George Sutcliffe as Secretary of the Department of Shipping and Fuel
Preceded by Jack Stevens	Secretary of the Department of Supply; 1953 – 1959	Succeeded by John Knott
