= Department of National Development (Australia) =

Australian government department

Department overview
- Formed: 16 March 1950
- Preceding Department: Department of Supply and Development
- Dissolved: 19 December 1972
- Jurisdiction: Commonwealth of Australia
- Department executives: Robert Jackson, Secretary (1950–1951); Jack Stevens, Secretary (1950–1951); Harold Raggatt, Secretary (1951–1965); Bill Boswell, Secretary (1965–1969); Lloyd Bott, Secretary (1969–1972)

Department of National Development
Department overview
- Formed: 20 December 1977
- Preceding Department: Department of National Resources – for energy planning, research, minerals exploration and resource assessment, water resources and electricity, geodesy and mapping Department of Environment, Housing and Community Development – for decentralisation
- Dissolved: 8 December 1979
- Superseding Department: Department of National Development and Energy
- Jurisdiction: Commonwealth of Australia
- Headquarters: Australian Capital Territory
- Minister responsible: Kevin Newman, Minister for National Development
- Department executive: Alan Woods, Secretary

The Department of National Development was an Australian government department that existed between March 1950 and December 1972, and between December 1977 and December 1979.

== History ==
The Department of National Development was established in March 1950, with Richard Casey, Baron Casey as its minister. Media reported that the new department would plan for the supply of basic commodities, promote decentralisation and regional development and plan for the development of primary and manufacturing industries and the stimulation of housing construction.

By 1969, the department consisted of five divisions: the resources policy division; the northern development division; the Bureau of Mineral Resources; the Forestry and Timber Bureau; and the division of national mapping.

The department was one of six abolished by the Whitlam government in December 1972. It functions were split between four new departments, namely the Department of Environment and Conservation, the Department of Minerals and Energy and the Department of Northern Development, as well as two established departments—the Department of Works and the Department of Primary Industry.

The department was created for the second time on 20 December 1977, by the Fraser government, before it was abolished two years later in 8 December 1979.

== Scope ==
Information about the department's functions and government funding allocation could be found in the Administrative Arrangements Orders, the annual Portfolio Budget Statements and in the department's annual reports.

At its first creation, the department was responsible for the following:

- Survey of immediate shortages in basic commodities and planning of improvements by increased production or import
- Promotion of decentralisation and regional development throughout the Commonwealth and the Territories of the Commonwealth
- Surveys of natural resources and development
- Planning the development of national resources generally, and in particular the development of primary and manufacturing industries and the stimulation of housing and building construction
- Administration of Commonwealth-State Housing Agreements
- Development planning in conjunction with the various States and, where necessary, co-ordination of such development planning, including the investigation of such national works as are referred to the department by the Government
- In conjunction with Treasury and other interested Departments, to make arrangements with the respective States and Other Governmental authorities with regard to the cost and execution of development projects
- To control funds required for the approved programme of development work

At its second creation in 1979, the department was responsible for the following:

- National energy planning and research
- Minerals exploration and resource assessment
- Water resources and electricity
- Geodesy and mapping
- Decentralisation

== Structure ==
The department was a Commonwealth Public Service department, staffed by officials who were responsible to the minister for national development. In order of appointment, the department's ministers were: Richard Casey, Bill Spooner, David Fairbairn, Reginald Swartz and Lance Barnard, and Kevin Newman between 1977 and 1979. The secretary of the department was A.J. Woods.

== List of national development ministers ==
Order	Minister	Party	Prime Minister	Title	Term start	Term end	Term in office
1	John Dedman	Labor	Curtin	Minister for Postwar Reconstruction	2 February 1945	6 July 1945	4 years, 320 days
1	John Dedman	Labor	Forde	Minister for Postwar Reconstruction	6 July 1945	13 July 1945	4 years, 320 days
1	John Dedman	Labor	Chifley	Minister for Postwar Reconstruction	13 July 1945	19 December 1949	4 years, 320 days
2	Eric Harrison	Liberal	Menzies	Minister for Postwar Reconstruction	19 December 1949	17 March 1950	88 days
3	Richard Casey	Liberal	Menzies	Minister for National Development	17 March 1950	11 May 1951	1 year, 55 days
4	Bill Spooner	Liberal	Menzies	Minister for National Development	11 May 1951	10 June 1964	13 years, 30 days
5	David Fairbairn	Liberal	Menzies	Minister for National Development	10 June 1964	21 January 1966	5 years, 155 days
5	David Fairbairn	Liberal	Holt	Minister for National Development	26 January 1966	19 December 1967	5 years, 155 days
5	David Fairbairn	Liberal	McEwen	Minister for National Development	19 December 1967	10 January 1968	5 years, 155 days
5	David Fairbairn	Liberal	Gorton	Minister for National Development	10 January 1968	12 November 1969	5 years, 155 days
6	Reginald Swartz	Liberal	Gorton	Minister for National Development	12 November 1969	10 March 1971	3 years, 23 days
6	Reginald Swartz	Liberal	McMahon	Minister for National Development	10 March 1971	5 December 1972	3 years, 23 days
7	Lance Barnard	Labor	Whitlam	Minister for National Development	5 December 1972	19 December 1972	14 days
8	Rex Patterson	Labor	Whitlam	Minister for Northern Development	19 December 1972	11 November 1975	2 years, 327 days
9	Kevin Newman	Liberal	Fraser	Minister for National Development	20 December 1977	8 December 1979	1 year, 353 days
10	John Carrick	Liberal	Fraser	Minister for National Development and Energy	8 December 1979	11 March 1983	3 years, 93 days
