= Department of Resources and Energy =

Australian government department, 1983–1987

Department overview
- Formed: 11 March 1983
- Preceding Department: Department of National Development and Energy Department of Trade and Resources
- Dissolved: 24 July 1987
- Superseding Department: Department of Primary Industries and Energy Department of Administrative Services (III)
- Jurisdiction: Commonwealth of Australia
- Headquarters: Canberra
- Ministers responsible: Peter Walsh, Minister (1983–1984); Gareth Evans, Minister (1984–1987)
- Department executives: Alan Woods, Secretary (1983–1986); Graham Evans, Secretary (1986–1987)

The Department of Resources and Energy was an Australian government department that existed between March 1983 and July 1987.

== History ==
The Department was one of three new Departments established by the Hawke government in March 1983, to ensure the priorities of the Labor government could be given effect to readily following the federal election of that month.

The Department was dissolved in July 1987 as part of a large overhaul of the Public Service that reduced the number of departments from 28 to 17.

== Scope ==
Information about the department's functions and government funding allocation could be found in the Administrative Arrangements Orders, the annual Portfolio Budget Statements and in the Department's annual reports.

At its creation, the Department was responsible for the following:

- National energy policy, including planning and research into coal, oil and gas, uranium, solar energy and other forms of energy
- Radioactive waste management
- Minerals exploration and resource assessment
- Water resources, soil conservation, and electricity
- Geodesy and mapping
- Decentralisation and urban planning and development
- Local government

== Structure ==
The Department was a Commonwealth Public Service department, staffed by officials who were responsible to the Minister for Resources and Energy, Peter Walsh (from 1983 to 1984) and then Gareth Evans (from 1984). The Secretary of the Department was A.J. Woods (until 1986) and then G. Evans (from 1986).
