= John Knott (public servant) =

Australian public servant

Sir John Knott AC CBE

Secretary of the Department of Defence Production
- In office 8 August 1957 – 23 April 1958

Secretary of the Department of Supply
- In office 13 October 1959 – 12 March 1966

Director-General of the Postmaster-General's Department
- In office 12 December 1968 – 14 January 1972

Personal details
- Born: John Lawrence Knott; 6 July 1910 Romsey, Victoria, Australia
- Died: 8 March 1999 (aged 88) Richmond, Victoria, Australia
- Education: University of Melbourne
- Occupation: Public servant

Sir John Lawrence Knott AC CBE (6 July 1910 – 8 March 1999) was a senior Australian public servant. He was Director-General of the Postmaster-General's Department from 1968 to 1972. Afterwards he was appointed a company director in private industry.

== Life and career ==
Knott was born in Romsey, Victoria on 6 July 1910.

Between August 1957 and April 1958, Knott headed the Department of Defence Production.

He was Secretary of the Department of Supply between 1959 and 1966. During his time in the role, he accompanied Minister for Supply Allen Fairhall overseas visiting the United Kingdom and the United States on departmental business.

In 1966, Knott was appointed Deputy High Commissioner London. At the end of his term in November 1968, when he had been already appointed to head the Postmaster-General's Department starting the following month, Knott attended the UN World Space Conference in Vienna.

Between December 1968 and January 1972, Knott was Director-General of the Postmaster-General's Department.

In 1972, Knott was appointed to the board of Equity Trustees and Agency Co Ltd.

Knott died in Richmond, Victoria on 8 March 1999.

== Awards ==
- While Deputy Secretary of the Defence Production Department in January 1957, Knott was made an Officer of the Order of the British Empire. He was promoted to Commander of the Order in December 1960 whilst Secretary of the Department of Supply.
- Knott was appointed a Knight Bachelor in June 1971 for his public service. He was made a Companion of the Order of Australia in 1981.

Government offices
Preceded by Harold Breen	Secretary of the Department of Defence Production; 1957 – 1958	Succeeded by Frank O'Connor as Secretary of the Department of Supply
Preceded by Frank O'Connor	Secretary of the Department of Supply; 1959 – 1966	Succeeded by Alan Cooley
Preceded by Trevor Housley	Director-General of the Postmaster-General's Department; 1968 – 1972	Succeeded by E.F. Lane
