= Neil Currie =

Australian public servant & policymaker (1926-1999)

Sir Neil Currie CBE

Secretary of the Department of Supply
- In office 1 November 1971 – 12 June 1974

Secretary of the Department of Manufacturing Industry
- In office 12 June 1974 – 22 December 1975

Secretary of the Department of Industry and Commerce
- In office 22 December 1975 – 7 May 1982

Personal details
- Born: Neil Smith Currie; 20 August 1926 Mackay, Queensland
- Died: 30 July 1999 (aged 72) Batemans Bay, New South Wales
- Spouse: Geraldine Evelyn Dexter (m. 1951)
- Children: Deborah, Keith, Bruce and Janet
- Parent: George Alexander Currie
- Education: University of Western Australia (BA)
- Occupation: Public servant

Sir Neil Smith Currie CBE (20 August 1926 – 30 July 1999) was a senior Australian public servant and policymaker.

== Life and career ==
Neil Currie was born on 20 August 1926 in Mackay, Queensland.

Currie began his Commonwealth public service career in 1948 as a cadet in the Department of External Affairs. He graduated from his cadetship alongside Rowen Osborn, and Barrie Dexter.

Currie married Geraldine Evelyn Dexter in Tokyo in 1951 during his first posting there. Their engagement had been announced in March 1951. Three of the couple's four children were born in Tokyo.

He held several positions as a departmental head, namely Secretary of the Department of Supply between 1971 and 1974, Secretary of the Department of Manufacturing Industry between 1974 and 1975, and Secretary of the Department of Industry and Commerce.

In 1982 then Foreign Minister Tony Street appointed Currie the Australian Ambassador to Japan. His posting, until 1986, was at a time when Japan was Australia's biggest trading partner.

Currie died in Batemans Bay on 30 July 1999, aged 72. His wife, Geraldine, died on 2 May 2019 at the age of 92.

== Awards and honours ==
Currie was made a Commander of the Order of the British Empire in 1978. In the 1982 Birthday Honours he was appointed a Knight Bachelor.

In 2000, the Australia Japan Foundation established the Sir Neil Currie Australian Studies Award Program to commemorate Currie's life and his contribution to Australian-Japanese relations.

A street in the Canberra suburb of Casey in 2009 was named Neil Currie Street in his honour.

Government offices
Preceded by Alan Cooley	Secretary of the Department of Supply; 1971 – 1974	Succeeded by Himself as Secretary of the Department of Manufacturing Industry
Preceded by Himself as Secretary of the Department of Supply	Secretary of the Department of Manufacturing Industry; 1974 – 1975	Succeeded by Himself as Secretary of the Department of Industry and Commerce
Preceded by Frank Pryor as Secretary of the Department of Secondary Industry	Secretary of the Department of Manufacturing Industry; 1974 – 1975	Succeeded by Himself as Secretary of the Department of Industry and Commerce
Preceded by Himself as Secretary of the Department of Manufacturing Industry	Secretary of the Department of Industry and Commerce (I); 1975 – 1982	Succeeded by Tom Hayes as Secretary of the Department of Industry and Commerce (II)
Diplomatic posts
Preceded by James Plimsoll	Australian Ambassador to Japan; 1982 – 1986	Succeeded by Geoff Miller
