= Gungahlin Cemetery =

Cemetery in Canberra, Australia

- Interactive map of Gungahlin Cemetery

Details
- Established: 1979
- Location: Canberra
- Country: Australia
- Coordinates: 35.215°S 149.137°E
- Owned by: ACT Public Cemeteries Authority
- No. of interments: 10,000
- Website: Gungahlin Cemetery
- Find a Grave: Gungahlin Cemetery

The Gungahlin Cemetery is a major cemetery in Canberra, the capital of Australia. It is located in Mitchell, Australian Capital Territory.

The cemetery opened in 1979.

It includes a natural burial ground and an aboriginal lawn.

== Notable burials ==
- Diane Barwick anthropologist, historian
- Vice Admiral Henry Burrell
- Maisie Carr botanist
- Charles and Lee-Lee Chan parents of actor/director Jackie Chan
- Sir Edwin William "Ted" Hicks CBE public servant
- Sir Edwin McCarthy CBE public servant
- Gunther E. Rothenberg military historian
- Vic Skermer CBE public servant
- Alan Woods AC public servant
- John Kerin AO former senior government minister.
- Aleksander Tupalski polish ice hockey and football player
