= Pipeline Debate =

1956 Canadian political event

The Pipeline Debate (May 8 – June 6, 1956) was a political event in the history of the Parliament of Canada. The debate was on the finances of the TransCanada pipeline, proper parliamentary procedure, and American economic influence on Canada. The controversy eventually contributed to the defeat of Louis St. Laurent at the polls in 1957, ending 22 years of Liberal rule, and bringing in a government under Progressive Conservative Prime Minister John Diefenbaker.

== Background ==
To meet the growing needs of Ontario and Quebec with the bountiful supply of natural gas in Alberta, St. Laurent and his Minister of Trade and Commerce, C. D. Howe, decided to allow TransCanada PipeLines, LP to build a gas pipeline from the west to the east. St. Laurent and Howe favoured a longer, more expensive route, entirely through Canadian territory, rejecting the route of the American oil pipeline, which was shorter but crossed into the United States on its way to Eastern Canada. The parliamentary debate on the issue focused on two issues:

- A consortium that included American interests required government loans to cover the extra costs incurred by building the long route.
- Whether involving American businesses in the construction would inevitably lead to the government surrendering the pipeline to American control.

The opposition Progressive Conservative Party and Co-operative Commonwealth Federation planned to delay the plan with a filibuster.

== Debate ==
The opposition parties were aware that parliamentary approval of the plan had to be obtained by June 6, 1956, to get necessary financing in time for pipeline construction to start by July 1, as the Liberal government had promised. The opposition believed that if the Liberals missed this deadline, the plan might fall apart under its own weight, and a new all-Canadian consortium or a Crown corporation might be put together.

To counter the opposition tactics, the Liberals attempted to force closure, a vote ending debate and forcing a final vote, at every stage of the bill. The motions were carried by the Liberal majority. Two weeks of debate received much coverage in most media outlets.

== Deadline ==
On the day before the deadline, Liberal Speaker of the House of Commons René Beaudoin allowed the opposition to debate a procedural matter. He ruled at the end of the day that debate on this issue would continue the following day, effectively allowing the opposition parties to debate the issue past the deadline. Howe was furious at the action.

However, at the next day's session, Beaudoin announced that the previous day's ruling was a mistake caused by the procedural confusion, all events after 2:15 that day should be ignored, and debate would immediately recommence on the pipeline. The opposition parties strongly objected to the reversal, and chaos quickly broke out in Commons. MPs ran into the centre aisle, and Major Coldwell, the CCF Leader, went on to the Speaker's dais, shaking his fist and berating Beaudoin. Liberal MP Lorne MacDougall died while in the Centre Block, which was then blamed on the stress of the issue.

The Opposition claimed that the Prime Minister and Howe had pressured the Speaker to change his mind. As a result of the Speaker's reversal, Howe and St. Laurent were able to push through the loan guarantee legislation on June 6. The deadline turned out not to be as important as originally thought: the factories that would construct pipe for the pipeline went on strike, delaying construction for a full year.

== Aftermath ==
The Progressive Conservatives used the pipeline debate to show that the Liberals had become arrogant during their 21 consecutive years in government. In the 1957 election, the Progressive Conservatives won a minority government, and in the 1958 election, Diefenbaker won the largest majority in Canadian history.

Beaudoin's reputation was also destroyed. A motion of censure was tabled by George Drew but failed by Liberal opposition.

The loans given to the American businesses involved in the construction of the pipeline were paid in full, ahead of schedule, and the pipeline still remains under Canadian control. TransCanada Corporation of Calgary, Alberta, owns and operates the pipeline. TransCanada Corp. is a publicly traded company on the Toronto Stock Exchange and the New York Stock Exchange.
