= Harold Raggatt =

Australian public servant and geologist

Sir Harold Raggatt CBE
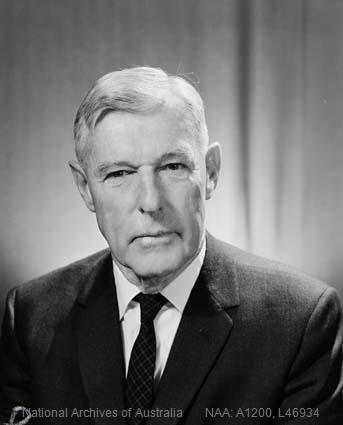
- Harold Raggatt in 1964

Secretary of the Department of National Development
- In office 16 July 1951 – 24 January 1965

Personal details
- Born: Harold George Raggatt; 25 January 1900 North Sydney
- Died: 2 November 1968 (aged 68) Hughes, Canberra
- Education: University of Sydney
- Occupation: Public servant

Sir Harold George Raggatt CBE (25 January 1900 – 2 November 1968) was a senior Australian public servant and geologist, best known for his time as Secretary of the Department of National Development.

== Life and career ==
Harold Raggatt was born on 25 January 1900 in North Sydney, New South Wales.

Raggatt joined the Australian Public Service in 1939.

Between 1951 and 1965, Raggatt was Secretary of the Department of National Development. In the role, he worked to measure Australia's natural resources, and to develop a policy to assist in Australia's economic development. In 1960, he helped broker the lifting of the 20-year embargo on Australian export of iron ore.

== Awards ==
Raggat was made a Commander of the Order of the British Empire in June 1954. In June 1963, Raggatt was appointed a Knight Bachelor.

Government offices
Preceded by Robert Jackson	Secretary of the Department of National Development; 1951 – 1965	Succeeded by Bill Boswell
