= Bill Boswell =

Australian public servant

Bill Boswell OBE

Secretary of the Department of National Development
- In office 1965–1969

Personal details
- Born: Robert William McGregor Boswell; 30 September 1911 Carlton, Melbourne
- Died: 17 February 1976 (aged 64) Lucas Heights, Sydney
- Education: University of Melbourne
- Occupation: Public servant

Robert William McGregor Boswell OBE (30 September 1911 – 17 February 1976) was a senior Australian public servant. He was best known for his time as Secretary of the Department of National Development.

== Life and career ==
Bill Boswell was born on 30 September 1911 in Carlton, Melbourne.

From 1958, Boswell was Director of the Weapons Research Establishment at Salisbury in South Australia.

Between 1965 and 1969, Boswell was the Secretary of the Department of National Development.

Boswell died in Lucas Heights, Sydney on 17 February 1976.

== Awards ==
While a research scholar at University of Melbourne, Boswell worked in a team of four using radio direction-finding to trace the movement of thunderstorms associated with cold fronts crossing the southern part of Australia, and for his work was awarded a Fred Knight scholarship.

Boswell was made an Officer of the Order of the British Empire in May 1956 for his role in guided weapons development.

Government offices
| Preceded by Harold Raggatt | Secretary of the Department of National Development; 1965 – 1969 | Succeeded by Lloyd Bott |
