= John Carrick (Australian politician) =

Australian politician

The Honourable Sir John Carrick AC, KCMG
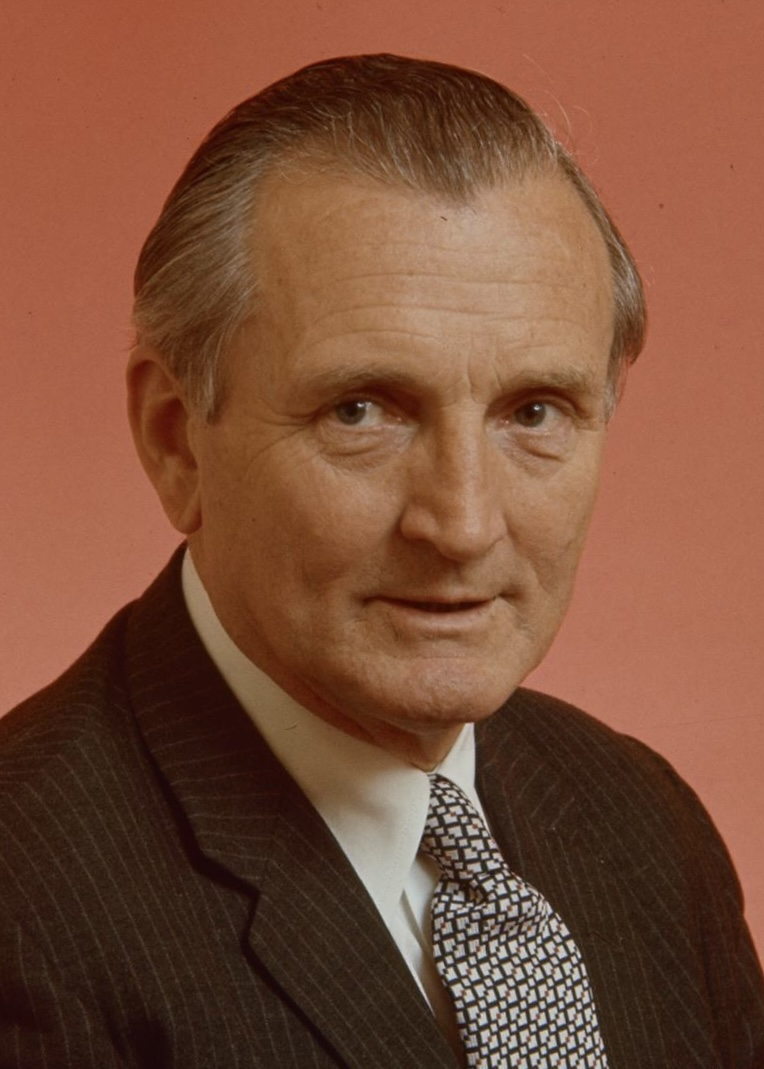
- Carrick in 1974

Leader of the Government in the Senate
- In office 7 August 1978 – 11 March 1983
- Prime Minister: Malcolm Fraser
- Preceded by: Reg Withers
- Succeeded by: John Button

Minister for National Development and Energy
- In office 8 December 1979 – 11 March 1983
- Prime Minister: Malcolm Fraser
- Preceded by: Kevin Newman
- Succeeded by: Peter Walsh

Minister for Education
- In office 22 December 1975 – 8 December 1979
- Prime Minister: Malcolm Fraser
- Preceded by: Margaret Guilfoyle
- Succeeded by: Wal Fife

Minister for Urban and Regional Development
- In office 11 November 1975 – 22 December 1975
- Prime Minister: Malcolm Fraser
- Preceded by: Tom Uren
- Succeeded by: Ivor Greenwood

Minister for Housing and Construction
- In office 11 November 1975 – 22 December 1975
- Prime Minister: Malcolm Fraser
- Preceded by: Joe Riordan
- Succeeded by: John McLeay as Minister for Works; Ivor Greenwood as Minister for Environment, Housing and Community Development

Senator for New South Wales
- In office 1 July 1971 – 5 June 1987

Personal details
- Born: 4 September 1918 Sydney, New South Wales, Australia
- Died: 18 May 2018 (aged 99) Melbourne, Victoria, Australia
- Party: Liberal
- Education: University of Sydney
- Occupation: Research officer

Sir John Leslie Carrick, AC, KCMG (4 September 1918 – 18 May 2018) was an Australian politician. He was a member of the Liberal Party and held senior ministerial office in the Fraser government, serving as Minister for Education (1975–1979) and Minister for National Development and Energy (1979–1983). He was also Leader of the Government in the Senate from 1978 to 1983.

== Early life ==
Carrick was born in Sydney in 1918, as the fourth of six children born to Emily (née Terry) and Arthur James Carrick. His father worked as a clerk in the Government Printing Office, but lost his job during the Great Depression. Carrick grew up in Woollahra, Randwick, and Bondi, and attended the local state schools. He eventually won a scholarship to the selective Sydney Technical High School. He worked for the Australian Gas Light Company after leaving school, while attending night classes in chemistry at Sydney Technical College. He eventually was admitted to the University of Sydney, graduating with a Bachelor of Economics in 1941.

After previously serving in the Sydney University Regiment, Carrick joined the Australian Imperial Force in December 1940. He was posted to the 18th Anti-Tank Battery, which in December 1941 was deployed to West Timor as part of the Sparrow Force. After landing he was captured by the Japanese. Carrick was initially imprisoned on Java and later in Singapore's Changi prison camp. In 1943, he was sent to work on the Burma Railway, including at Hellfire Pass. He learned enough Malay and Japanese to act as an interpreter. After his liberation towards the end of the war, he was seconded to the Supreme Allied Commander, Lord Mountbatten.

== Political career ==
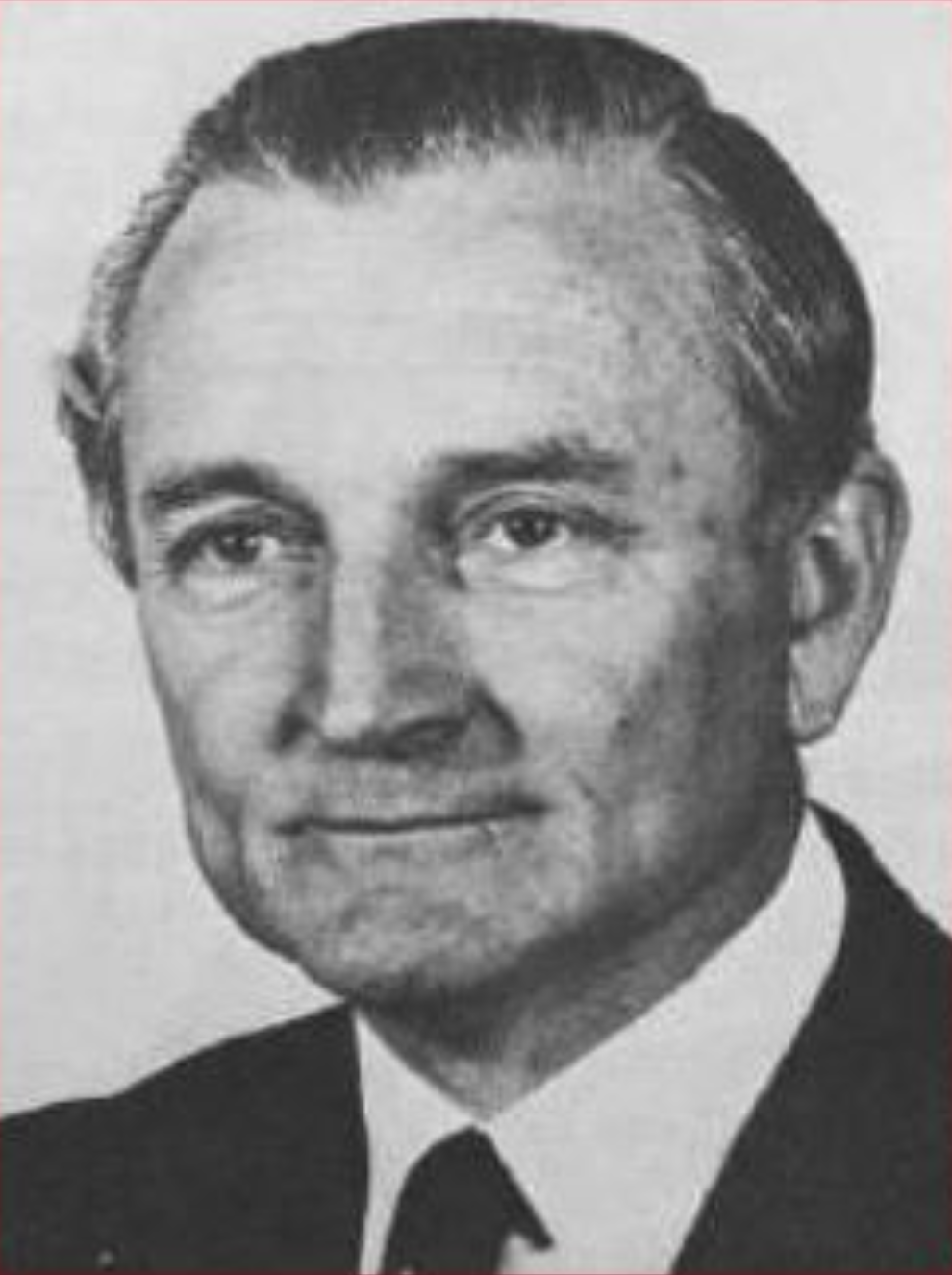
Carrick in 1971

In January 1946, Carrick began working as a research officer for the New South Wales Division of the Liberal Party. He was appointed general secretary of the Division in 1948, and would hold the position until 1971. The Bulletin dubbed him the "grey eminence of Ash Street", referring to the location of the party's headquarters. Along with the state president, Bill Spooner, Carrick toured New South Wales founding new branches and looking for prospective candidates. He published a book about liberalism in 1949 titled The Liberal Way of Progress. The Liberals were in power federally for virtually the duration of Carrick's tenure as general secretary, but did not win a state election until 1965, when Robert Askin was elected as premier.

After the retirement of Alister McMullin, Carrick won Liberal preselection for the 1970 half-Senate election, and was elected to a term beginning on 1 July 1971. He used his maiden speech to promote a series of proposed reforms to the relationship between the federal government and the states. His second speech was given in support of Senator Lionel Murphy's private member's bill for the abolition of capital punishment, which he described as "legal murder". The bill passed the Senate but was defeated in the House of Representatives; a similar bill eventually passed in 1973. Carrick was a strong defender of the powers of the Senate, which he viewed as "the only safeguard against unbridled power and arrogance". He was one of the leading advocates for the Senate's deferral of the Whitlam government's appropriation bills, which led to the 1975 constitutional crisis and the eventual dismissal of the government.

Carrick had been added to the shadow cabinet in 1974, under Billy Snedden, and retained his place under Malcolm Fraser. He was Minister for Housing and Construction and Minister for Urban and Regional Development in the caretaker government from November to December 1975, and then served as Minister for Education from 1975 to 1979 and Minister for National Development and Energy from 1979 to 1983. He was also Leader of the Government in the Senate from 1978 to 1983. He retired from politics at the double dissolution election of 1987.

== Later life ==
From 1988 to 1989, Carrick was chairman of the Committee of Review of NSW Schools. This committee conducted a comprehensive inquiry from birth to HSC including the drafting of 1990 Education Reform Act. He subsequently reviewed the implementation of the report up to 1995. From 1992 to 1995 he was a member of the New South Wales Ministerial Advisory Council for Teacher Education.

As part of this process he travelled around New South Wales and met with students and teachers across both the public and private education systems in order to learn ways in which teacher education could be improved. From 1992 to 2001 he was a member of the Advisory Board of the Macquarie University Institute of Early Childhood.

In 1998, he became the chairman of the Advisory Committee, Gifted Education Research, Resource and Information Centre at the University of New South Wales. In 2001, he was appointed chairman of the Macquarie University Institute of Early Childhood Foundation.

In 2012, Connor Court Press published a biography of Carrick written by Graeme Starr, titled Carrick: Principles, Politics, and Policy. It was launched by John-Paul Langbroek, the Queensland Minister for Education.

== Honours and awards ==
In 1982, Carrick was made a Knight Commander of the Order of St Michael and St George (KCMG), "for services to the Parliament of Australia". He was awarded honorary Doctor of Letters degrees by the University of Sydney (1988) and Macquarie University (2000), and, in 1994, he was appointed an Honorary Fellow of the Australian College of Educators.

He received the Centenary Medal in 2001, "for outstanding leadership and service to the Australian community, especially through education", and in 2008 was appointed a Companion of the Order of Australia (AC), "for distinguished service in the area of educational reform in Australia, particularly through the advancement of early childhood education and to the development and support of new initiatives in the tertiary sector, and to the broader community". The Carrick Institute for Learning and Teaching in Higher Education was named after him in 2004.

== Personal life and death ==
On 2 June 1951, Carrick married Diana Margaret Hunter. The couple had three daughters together. One daughter, Jane, became a gastroenterologist and married Liberal politician Bob Woods. Carrick was widowed in February 2018, a few months before his own death. His wife served as chief commissioner of Girl Guides Australia from 1983 to 1988, and was an Officer of the Order of Australia (AO).

Carrick died on 18 May 2018 at the age of 99 in Sydney, some four months before what would have been his centenary. Prime Minister Malcolm Turnbull and former prime ministers John Howard, Kevin Rudd and Tony Abbott all issued condolence statements. Turnbull's statement described Carrick as "a lion of the Liberal Party, a soldier and a statesman whose passion for education improved the lives of many Australians", while Howard cited Carrick as a "close friend and political mentor" who "taught me more about politics than anyone else".

Political offices
Preceded by Joe Riordan	Minister for Housing and Construction; 1975	Succeeded by John McLeay as Minister for Works
Preceded by Joe Riordan	Minister for Housing and Construction; 1975	Succeeded by Ivor Greenwood as Minister for Environment, Housing and Community Development
Preceded by Tom Uren	Minister for Urban and Regional Development; 1975	Succeeded by Ivor Greenwood as Minister for Environment, Housing and Community Development
Preceded by Margaret Guilfoyle	Minister for Education; 1975–1979	Succeeded by Wal Fife
Preceded by Kevin Newman as Minister for National Development	Minister for National Development and Energy; 1979–1983	Succeeded by Peter Walsh as Minister for Resources and Energy
Preceded by Reg Withers	Vice-President of the Executive Council; 1978–1982	Succeeded by James Killen
Party political offices
Preceded by Reg Withers	Leader of the Liberal Party in the Senate; 1978–1983	Succeeded by Fred Chaney
