= Department of National Development and Energy =

Australian government department, 1979–1983

Department overview
- Formed: 8 December 1979
- Preceding Department: Department of National Development (II)
- Dissolved: 11 March 1983
- Superseding Department: Department of Territories and Local Government – for local government Department of Resources and Energy – for national development and energy Department of Trade and Resources – for sections of the Atomic Energy Act 1953 Department of Industry and Commerce (II) – for decentralisation and urban planning and development
- Jurisdiction: Commonwealth of Australia
- Headquarters: Canberra
- Minister responsible: John Carrick, Minister for National Development and Energy
- Department executive: Alan Woods, Secretary

The Department of National Development and Energy was an Australian government department that existed between December 1979 and March 1983. It replaced the Department of National Development and inherited domestic resources and energy matters from the Department of Trade and Resources.

== Scope ==
Information about the department's functions and government funding allocation could be found in the Administrative Arrangements Orders, the annual Portfolio Budget Statements and in the department's annual reports.

At its creation, the department was responsible for the following:

- National energy policy, including planning and research into coal, oil and gas, uranium, solar energy and other forms of energy
- Radioactive waste management.
- Minerals exploration and resource assessment.
- Water resources, soil conservation, and electricity.
- Geodesy and mapping.
- Decentralisation and urban planning and development.
- Local government.

== Structure ==
The department was a Commonwealth Public Service department, staffed by officials who were responsible to the Minister for National Development and Energy, John Carrick. The Secretary of the Department was A.J. Woods.
