= Department of Supply =

Australian government department, 1950–1974

Department overview
- Formed: 16 March 1950
- Preceding Department: Department of Supply and Development (II)
- Dissolved: 12 June 1974
- Superseding Department: Department of Manufacturing Industry Department of the Special Minister of State (I) - for Australian Government purchasing policy
- Jurisdiction: Commonwealth of Australia
- Ministers responsible: Howard Beale, Minister (1950–1958); Athol Townley, Minister (1958); Alan Hulme, Minister (1958–1961); Allen Fairhall, Minister (1961–1966); Denham Henty, Minister (1966–1968); Ken Anderson, Minister (1968—1971); Victor Garland, Minister (1971–1972); Lance Barnard, Minister (1972–1973)
- Department executives: Harold Breen, Secretary (1950–1951); Jack Stevens, Secretary (1951–1953); Frank O'Connor, Secretary (1953–1959); John Knott, Secretary (1959–1966); Alan Cooley, Secretary (1966–1971); Neil Currie, Secretary (1971–1974)

The Department of Supply was an Australian government department that existed between March 1950 and June 1974.

== History ==
Established in 1950, the Department of Supply headquarters transferred to Canberra in January 1968.

In 1964 the department won the Export Award for its contribution to Australia's export income and for its role in elevating Australia's international reputation in the field of advanced technology.

The department was dissolved on June 12, 1974.

== Scope ==
Information about the department's functions and government funding allocation could be found in the Administrative Arrangements Orders, the annual Portfolio Budget Statements and in the department's annual reports.

The functions of the department at its creation in 1950 were:

- Australian Aluminium Production Commission
- Control of materials which are or may be used in producing atomic energy
- Manufacture, acquisition, provision and supply of war material involving operation and management of factories, workshops and undertakings concerned in the production of war material
- Acquisition by the Commonwealth and the establishment of factories and workshops for the purpose of producing war material
- Securing of supplies of materials, plant, tools and equipment for that purpose
- Employment and training of technicians, workmen and others for that purpose
- Arrangements and all action necessary to secure the supply, manufacture, processing and delivery of war material
- Building of merchant ships and other vessels (other than naval vessels) and repair and maintenance of all merchant ships and the provision of dry-docking and repairing facilities for merchant ships
- Control and limitation of profits in relation to the production of war material by private enterprise
- Promotion and production of liquid fuels, and in particular, the production of power alcohol and benzol
- Importation and use of tin plate
- Procurement of supplies and foodstuffs for the Services and control of the production and distribution of supplies where their conservation is necessary

== Structure ==
The department was a Commonwealth Public Service department, staffed by officials who were responsible to the Minister for Supply.
