= Howard Beale (politician) =

Australian politician and diplomat

The Honourable Sir Howard Beale KBE
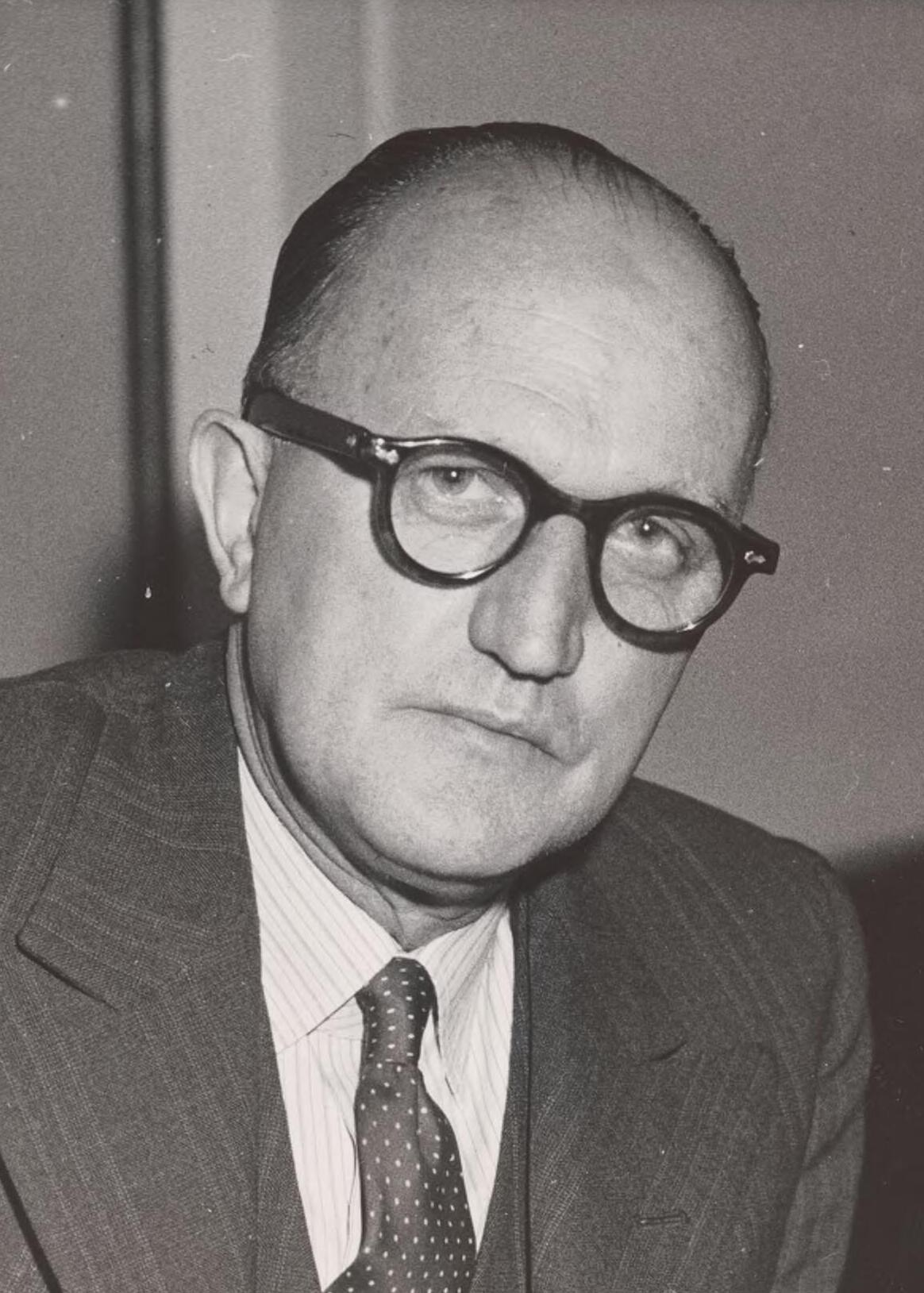
- Beale in 1950

Minister for Defence Production
- In office 24 October 1956 – 10 February 1958
- Prime Minister: Robert Menzies
- Preceded by: Eric Harrison
- Succeeded by: Athol Townley

Minister for Supply
- In office 17 March 1950 – 10 February 1958
- Prime Minister: Robert Menzies
- Preceded by: Richard Casey (Supply and Development)
- Succeeded by: Athol Townley

Minister for Transport
- In office 19 December 1949 – 17 March 1950
- Prime Minister: Robert Menzies
- Preceded by: Eddie Ward
- Succeeded by: George McLeay (Fuel, Shipping and Transport)

Minister for Information
- In office 19 December 1949 – 17 March 1950
- Prime Minister: Robert Menzies
- Preceded by: Arthur Calwell
- Succeeded by: Abolished

Member of the Australian Parliament for Parramatta
- In office 28 September 1946 – 10 February 1958
- Preceded by: Frederick Stewart
- Succeeded by: Garfield Barwick

6th Ambassador of Australia to the United States
- In office 20 March 1958 – 1 April 1964
- Preceded by: Percy Spender
- Succeeded by: Keith Waller

Personal details
- Born: 10 December 1898 Tamworth, New South Wales, Australia
- Died: 17 October 1983 (aged 84) Darling Point, New South Wales, Australia
- Party: UAP (1930s); Democratic (c. 1944); Liberal (from 1945)
- Spouse: Margery Wood (m. 1927)
- Children: Julian Beale
- Education: University of Sydney
- Occupation: Barrister

Sir Oliver Howard Beale KBE (10 December 1898 – 17 October 1983) was an Australian politician and diplomat. He was a member of the Liberal Party and served in the House of Representatives from 1946 to 1958, representing the New South Wales seat of Parramatta. He held ministerial office in the Menzies Government as Minister for Information (1949–1950), Transport (1949–1950), Supply (1950–1958), and Defence Production (1956–1958). He retired from parliament to serve as Australian Ambassador to the United States (1958–1964). His son Julian also entered politics.

== Early life ==
Beale was born on 10 December 1898 in Tamworth, New South Wales. He was one of four sons born to Clara Elizabeth (née Vickery) and Joseph Beale. His mother was the niece of businessman Ebenezer Vickery.

Beale's father, a Methodist minister, died in 1908 when his son was nine years old. He was educated at Sydney Boys High School and went on to the University of Sydney, graduating Bachelor of Arts in 1921 and Bachelor of Laws in 1925; his studies were interrupted by a bout of rheumatic fever which confined him to bed for six months. Beale was called to the bar in 1925 and subsequently practised as a barrister in Sydney. In addition to private practice, he represented the federal government in "matters relating to immigration, taxation, customs, navigation and national security matters".

During World War II, Beale served with the Royal Australian Naval Reserve as a sub-lieutenant in the Naval Auxiliary Patrol. He undertook anti-submarine patrols in the area around Broken Bay, including in his own motor cruiser.

== Politics ==
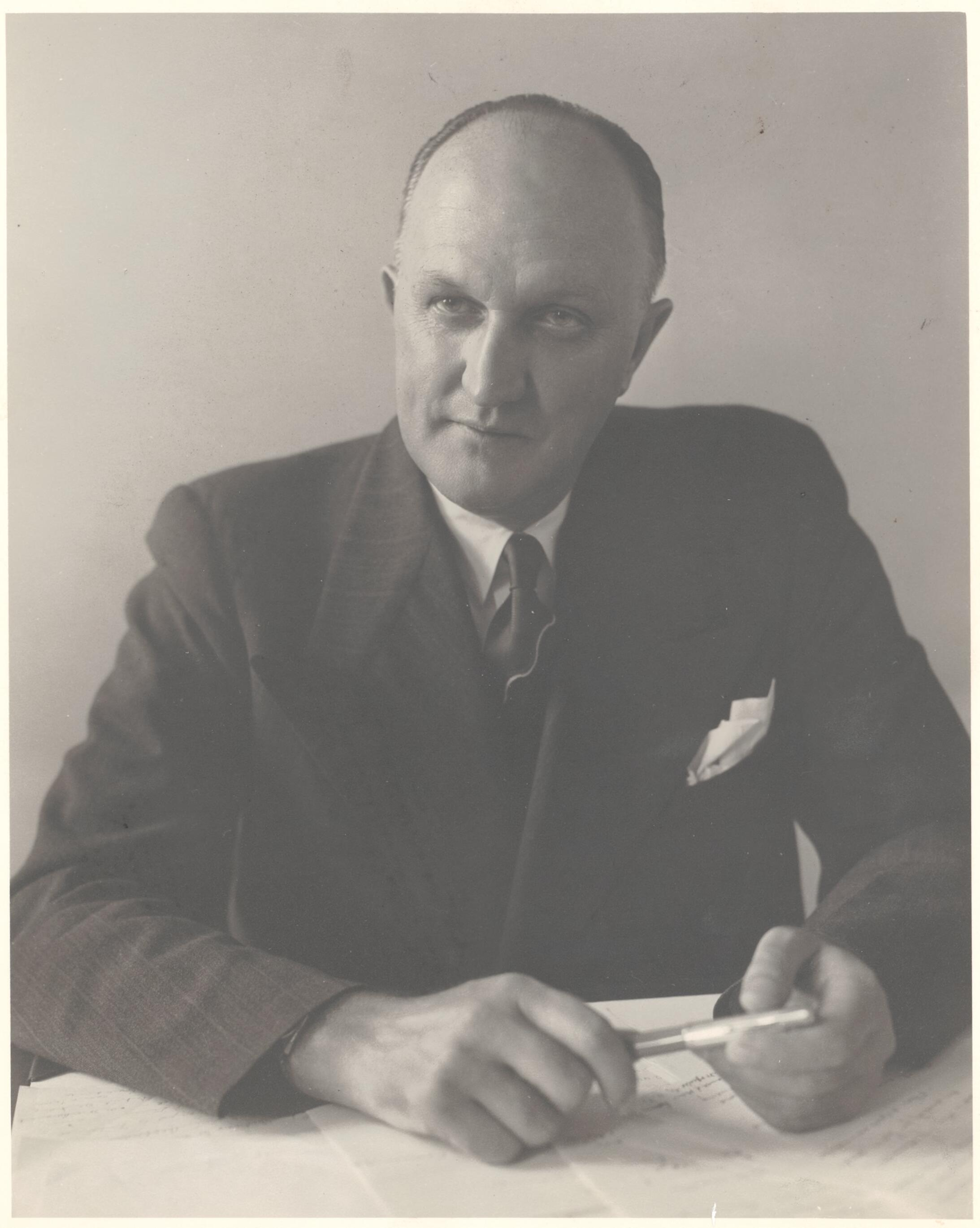
Beale in the 1950s

Beale became involved in politics through his friendship with former state premier William Holman. He joined a local branch of the United Australia Party (UAP), but welcomed the party's dissolution in the early 1940s and stood unsuccessfully for the Democratic Party in the seat of Hornsby at the 1944 New South Wales state election. He was defeated by the incumbent independent member Sydney Storey.

In 1945, Beale became a member of the inaugural state executive of the Liberal Party of Australia. He defeated 22 other candidates in the Liberal preselection ballot for the Division of Parramatta in February 1946, stating that the "preservation of individual freedom was the most important single objective of his party". He retained Parramatta for the Liberal Party at the 1946 federal election.

Following the Coalition's victory at the 1949 federal election, Beale was appointed Minister for Information and Minister for Transport in the Menzies government. He was responsible for restructuring the Department of Transport, which was merged into the Department of Fuel, Shipping and Transport in 1950. He was then replaced in the transport portfolio and appointed Minister for Supply, "a huge portfolio covering defence-related industries and including new ventures in aluminium production and uranium mining, atomic energy and weapons testing".

=== Atomic energy and nuclear weapons ===
In 1956, Beale was additionally appointed Minister for Defence Production. He was an advocate of atomic energy and nuclear weapons, helping facilitate the British nuclear weapons test in the Montebello Islands in 1956. He recommended that Australia "produce weapons-grade enriched plutonium and work towards the production of their own atomic bomb".

Of the proposed weapons test at Maralinga, Beale told the media in 1955 that "every precaution will be taken to ensure there is no danger to human beings or stock". This statement later proved to be untrue, with Aboriginal people and military servicemen becoming contaminated and fallout from tests being detected as far afield as Adelaide and Queensland. A Royal Commission into British nuclear tests in Australia took place, following Beale's death, in 1984–1985.

Beale said of nuclear power in 1956 that his government believed that "completely effective precautions have already been developed to avoid hazards to the population from the use of nuclear power reactors". He endorsed the study of radiation's effect following the Maralinga nuclear weapons tests. Anticipating an expansion in nuclear power generation and other uses of atomic energy, he stated that he believed that it was "necessary that we should expand our knowledge of the problems of radiation as fully and as quickly as possible".

== Ambassadorship and later life ==
Beale resigned from the House of Representatives on 10 February 1958 to take up an appointment as Australian Ambassador to the United States. He remained in the role until 1964 and dealt with a number of issues, including the status of the ANZUS Treaty with regard to the Indonesia–Malaysia confrontation, the Indonesian annexation of Dutch New Guinea, and the American intervention in South Vietnam. He was made a Knight Commander of the Order of the British Empire on 10 June 1961.

After returning to Australia, Beale served as president of the Arts Council of Australia – a private body unrelated to the later Australia Council for the Arts – from 1965 to 1968. He held a number of board roles, including as chairman of the Clausen Trading & Investment Co. Pty Ltd and vice-president of the Occidental Minerals Corporation of Australia. Beale was Regents' Visiting Professor in the University of California in 1966 and Regents' Visiting Professor at the University of Wisconsin–Madison in 1967 and in 1969.

== Personal life ==
In 1927, Beale married Margery Ellen Wood, a schoolteacher. Their son Julian was also a federal Liberal MP, while a daughter died in infancy.

Beale died on 17 October 1983 at his home in Darling Point, New South Wales, aged 84.

== Writings ==
- Beale, Howard (1977). This inch of time : memoirs of politics and diplomacy. Carlton, Vic: Melbourne University Press. p. 233. ISBN 0-522-84127-9.

Political offices
Preceded by Eddie Ward	Minister for Transport; 1949–1950	Succeeded by George McLeay
Preceded by Richard Casey	Minister for Supply; 1950–1958	Succeeded by Athol Townley
Preceded by Eric Harrison	Minister for Defence Production; 1956–1958	Succeeded by Athol Townley
Parliament of Australia
Preceded by Frederick Stewart	Member for Parramatta; 1946–1958	Succeeded by Garfield Barwick
Diplomatic posts
Preceded by Sir Percy Spender	Australian Ambassador to the United States; 1958–1964	Succeeded by Sir Keith Waller
