= Diane Barwick =

Canadian anthropologist (1938–1986)

- Born: 29 April 1938; Vancouver, British Columbia, Canada
- Died: 4 April 1986 (aged 47); Canberra, Australia
- Education: University of British Columbia; Australian National University
- Occupations: Anthropologist and historian

Diane Elizabeth McEachern Barwick (29 April 1938 – 4 April 1986) was a Canadian-born anthropologist, historian, and Aboriginal-rights activist. She was also a renowned researcher and teacher in the field of Australian Aboriginal culture and society.

== Early life and education ==
Barwick was born on 29 April 1938 in Vancouver, British Columbia, Canada. Her father was Ronald Bernard McEachern, who was a forest worker, high rigger, and camp manager, nicknamed 'Bear Tracks', and her mother was Beatrice Rosemond, née O’Flynn.

Barwick attended the University of British Columbia, graduating with honours in 1959. Her undergraduate thesis, The Logging Camp as Sub-Culture, focused on the subculture of the loggers of Englewood Valley and was based on fieldwork conducted in a number of logging camps. After graduating, she spent a year working at the Provincial Museum of Natural History and Anthropology in Victoria, British Columbia.

In 1960, she moved to Australia, where she undertook a PhD at the Australian National University (ANU) on scholarship, receiving it in 1964.

== Career ==
From March 1966 to June 1972, she was a research fellow in the Department of Anthropology and Sociology, Research School of Pacific Studies, ANU. She undertook research and teaching at the Australian Institute for Aboriginal and Torres Strait Islander Studies. She was employed as a tutor and a lecturer at ANU from 1974 to 1978. In 1979, she was a temporary research fellow in the Department of History, Research School of Social Sciences, ANU for a year.

In 1964, she became a founding member of the Australian Institute of Aboriginal Studies (AIAS). In 1978, she was the first woman to be elected to AIAS's council. Until 1982, she aided in the publications of the institute. From 1982 to 1986, she became a councillor for the institute's history committee; between 1983 and 1986, she had chaired the executive publications committee. In May 1985, she was appointed by the AIAS in an honorary capacity to establish a national Aboriginal biographical register.

In 1977, Barwick co-founded Aboriginal History, a journal of dedicated to aboriginal studies. She was an editor of the journal until 1982.

In 1980, she became involved in the Aboriginal Treaty Committee, working to ensure some official recognition, and protection, of Aboriginal rights.

== Death ==
On 4 April 1986, she died of a cerebral hemorrhage at Royal Canberra Hospital. She was buried in Gungahlin Cemetery with Catholic rites.

== Research ==
Barwick's research and writing focused on the traditional and contemporary aspects of aboriginal life, while she campaigned against prejudice and injustice for aboriginal people. She was particularly sensitive to Indigenous peoples' connection to land, and the impact of dispossession; her work stressed the importance of understanding the historical context of colonialism.

In 1984, she published the journal article "Mapping the Past: An Atlas of Victorian clans, 1835–1904", which has become a major reference understanding the traditional ownership of Aboriginal land in Victoria. This was to be the start of a larger project, but she died just days short of her 48th birthday having just started the second part of the project.

== Legacy ==
Diane Barwick St, in Canberra, is named in her honour.

== Selected bibliography ==
- Outcasts in White Australia, 1971.
- Handbook for Aboriginal and Islander History, Diane Barwick, Michael Mace and Tom Stannage, editors, Aboriginal History, Canberra, 1979. [Second edition 1980; third edition 1984]
- 'Mapping the Past: An Atlas of Victorian Clans 1835-1904', Part 1, Aboriginal History 1984, 8(2):100–31
- White, Isobel; Barwick, Diane; Meehan, Betty, eds. (1995). Fighters and Singers: The lives of some Australian Aboriginal women. North Sydney: George Allen & Unwin. ISBN 0-86861-612-5.

=== Posthumously ===
- Rebellion at Coranderrk by Diane Barwick. Edited by Laura E. Barwick and Richard E. Barwick. Published by Aboriginal History Incorporated, Canberra, 1998.
