= Robert Jackson (UN administrator) =

Australian naval officer (1911–1991)

Sir Robert Jackson AC KCVO CMG OBE

Secretary of the Department of National Development
- In office 17 March 1950 – 30 September 1950
- Preceded by: Harold Breen
- Succeeded by: Jack Stevens
- In office 2 June 1951 – 15 July 1951
- Preceded by: Jack Stevens
- Succeeded by: Sir Harold Raggatt

Personal details
- Born: Wilbur Kenneth Jackson; 8 November 1911 Fitzroy, Victoria, Australia
- Died: 12 January 1991 (aged 79) Roehampton, London, United Kingdom
- Spouse: Barbara Ward
- Civilian awards: Companion of the Order of Australia; Knight Commander of the Royal Victorian Order; Knight Bachelor; Companion of the Order of St Michael and St George
- Nickname: "Jacko"

Military service
- Allegiance: Australia
- Branch/service: Royal Australian Navy
- Years of service: 1929–1941
- Rank: Paymaster Commander
- Battles/wars: Second World War
- Military awards: Officer of the Order of the British Empire

Sir Robert Gillman Allen Jackson (8 November 1911 – 12 January 1991) was an Australian naval officer, public servant and United Nations administrator who specialised in technical and logistical assistance to the developing world.

== Early life ==
Jackson was born Wilbur Kenneth Jackson in Melbourne, Victoria, on 8 November 1911. He was educated at Cheltenham High School and Mentone Grammar School, which his father Archibald Jackson had helped found, but his father's death meant he did not go to university and so he started his career in the Royal Australian Navy at 18.

== Career ==
Jackson was seconded to the Royal Navy in 1938 and proved his ability in his plans for defending Malta during the Second World War, for which he was appointed an Officer of the Order of the British Empire. In 1941, he was appointed principal adviser to Oliver Lyttleton, War Cabinet minister in Cairo, and his work with the Middle East Supply Centre encouraging local food production across many countries fostered his diplomatic and administrative skills.

After the war, Jackson was responsible for the United Nations Relief and Rehabilitation Administration (UNRRA) projects in Europe, parts of Africa and the Far East, "the biggest UN relief operation ever". In May 1948 he became the assistant to Trygve Lie, first secretary-general of the UN. The two had an awkward working relationship, and he was ultimately removed from the position about four months later. Jackson returned to the United Kingdom to work at the Treasury before moving to the Australian Ministry of National Development.

Jackson came to specialise in multiple purpose river development schemes, and his obituary in The Times said "he was associated with virtually all major undertakings of this kind in the developing world". While working on the Volta project in Ghana from 1953 to 1960, he got to know Kwame Nkrumah. His time in Ghana led to the awards of Knight Bachelor in 1956, and Knight Commander of the Royal Victorian Order in 1962.

From the 1950s onward, he advised the governments of India and Pakistan, and in 1962 he went to the UN as consultant to Paul Hoffman of the United Nations Development Programme (UNDP), advising on technical, logistical and pre-investment aid to developing countries. By 1971, he had helped with UNDP projects in 60 countries.

The "Jackson Report" or "Capacity Study" on UN reform was published in 1969, urging that UN projects should be harmonised with a country's own development plan, and provoking some controversy. Margaret Anstee, another UN administrator, collaborated with him on this report. They became close personally as well as professionally, and their relationship continued until Jackson's death on 12 January 1991.

Jackson's last major operations were co-ordinating relief for Bangladesh between 1972 and 1975, and assistance for Kampuchea and Kampuchean refugees in Thailand between 1979 and 1984. He was made a Companion of the Order of Australia in 1986.

Jackson has been called a "master of logistics" with his work in Malta, UNRRA, and Bangladesh given particular praise.

== Personal life ==
Jackson married Barbara Ward in 1950, after his first marriage had ended. They had a son in 1956, but were legally separated in the early 1970s.

Jackson died in London on 12 January 1991 of a stroke.

Government offices
Preceded by Harold Breen as Secretary of the Department of Supply and Development	Secretary of the Department of National Development; 1950	Succeeded by Jack Stevens
Preceded by Jack Stevens	Secretary of the Department of National Development; 1951	Succeeded by Sir Harold Raggatt
