= Department of Defence Production =

Historical Australian government department

Department overview
- Formed: 11 May 1951
- Preceding Department: Department of Supply
- Dissolved: 23 Apr 1958
- Superseding Department: Department of Supply
- Jurisdiction: Commonwealth of Australia
- Headquarters: Melbourne
- Ministers responsible: Eric Harrison, Minister (1951‑56); Howard Beale, Minister (1956‑58); Athol Townley, Minister (1958)
- Department executives: Harold Breen, Secretary (1951‑57); John Knott, Secretary (1957‑58)

The Department of Defence Production was an Australian government department that existed between May 1951 and April 1958.

== Scope ==
Information about the department's functions and government funding allocation could be found in the Administrative Arrangements Orders, the annual Portfolio Budget Statements and in the Department's annual reports.

The Department was created with responsibility for the manufacture and supply of munitions (armaments, ammunition, weapons, machine tools, war chemicals, radar), aircraft production and defence production planning.

== Structure ==
The Department was a Commonwealth Public Service department, staffed by officials who were responsible to the Minister for Defence Production.
