= Jack Stevens (general) =

Australian Second World War general

Sir Jack Edwin Stawell Stevens
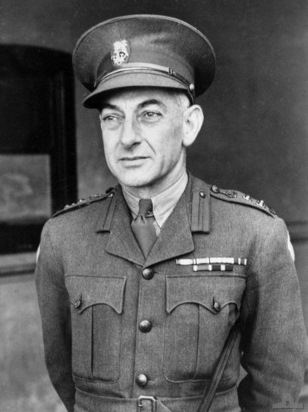
- Brigadier Jack Stevens in Sydney, October 1940
- Born: 7 September 1896; Daylesford, Victoria
- Died: 20 May 1969 (aged 72); Sydney, New South Wales
- Military career
- Allegiance: Australia
- Branch: Australian Army
- Service years: 1915–1919; 1921–1950
- Rank: Major General
- Service number: VX17
- Commands: 2nd Division (1947–50); 6th Division (1943–45); 12th Division (1942–43); Northern Territory Force (1942–43); 4th Division (1942); 21st Brigade (1940–42); 6th Divisional Signals (1939–40); 57th/60th Battalion (1935–39); 3rd Divisional Signals (1929–35); 4th Divisional Signals (1926–29)
- Conflicts: First World War; Western Front; Battle of Pozières; Battle of Polygon Wood; Second World War; Syria-Lebanon campaign; Battle of the Litani River; Battle of Damour; South West Pacific theatre; Aitape–Wewak campaign
- Awards: Knight Commander of the Order of the British Empire; Companion of the Order of the Bath; Distinguished Service Order; Meritorious Service Medal; Efficiency Decoration; Mentioned in Despatches

Major General Sir Jack Edwin Stawell Stevens, KBE, CB, DSO, ED (7 September 1896 – 20 May 1969) was a senior officer in the Australian Army during the Second World War. He was best known as the commanding officer of the 6th Division from 1943 to 1945.

== Early life ==
Born on 7 September 1896 at Daylesford, Victoria, Stevens was the youngest child of Herbert Clarence Stevens and Violet Ophelia, née Bury. He attended schooling at Daylesford. He began working at the age of 12 at a cigar factory, before joining the Postmaster-General's Department as a clerk in the electrical engineers' branch in 1915.

== First World War ==
Stevens enlisted on 2 July 1915 in the Australian Imperial Force in the Signal Corp and sailed for Egypt in November with the rank of corporal. He was promoted in March 1916 to sergeant and served with the 4th Divisional Signal Company. In June, he was sent to France and was awarded the Meritorious Service Medal for "devotion and keen sense of duty" during the battles of Pozières and the Ypres salient. He was transferred to the 5th Divisional Signal Company in February 1917 and was promoted to lieutenant in April. He saw action at Polygon Wood and was transferred to the Australian Corps Signal Company in March 1918. Upon arrival in Melbourne after the cessation of hostilities he was discharged from the Australian Imperial Force on 28 October 1919.

== Between the wars ==
Upon returning home Stevens returned to work with the Postmaster-General's Department. He married Catherine McAllister Macdonald at the Presbyterian Church, South Melbourne on 26 April 1920. Rejoinining the Militia in 1921, he was promoted to captain in 1922 and commanded the 2nd Cavalry Divisional Signals and was promoted to major in 1924. He was promoted to lieutenant colonel in command of the 4th Divisional Signals (1926–29), the 3rd Divisional Signals (1929–35) and the 57th/60th Battalion (1935–39).

== Second World War ==
Following the outbreak of the Second World War, Stevens was seconded to the Second Australian Imperial Force on 13 October 1939 and placed in command of the 6th Divisional Signals. He was chosen in April 1940 as the commander of the 21st Brigade, and was promoted to colonel and temporary brigadier. Sailing with his brigade, he left for the Middle East in October. During the Syrian campaign against Vichy French forces in Syria and Lebanon he directed the battle of the Litani River on 12 June where he was wounded. For his actions during this battle he was awarded the Distinguished Service Order and was mentioned in despatches. After recovering from his wounds he led the brigades actions during the successful coastal advance towards Sidon and in the Battle of Damour between 5–9 July 1941.

Stevens returned with the 21st Brigade to Australia in March 1942. Stevens was promoted to temporary major general and given command of the Militia's 4th Division in April before being appointed commander of Northern Territory Force in August. He was given the additional command responsibilities of the 12th Division and the Northern Territory Lines of Communications Area in December. Appointed the commanding officer of the 6th Division in April 1943 and oversaw the division's training on the Atherton Tableland, Queensland.

Stevens deployed to the Territory of New Guinea in late 1944 for action in the Aitape–Wewak campaign, advancing along the coast to Wewak and clearing Japanese units from the Aitape-Wewak & Maprik area. The campaign inflicted heavy losses on the Japanese 18th Army. He was appointed the Companion of the Order of the Bath for "gallant and distinguished service" and "outstanding leadership in operations against the Japanese" in 1946. He was relinquished of command against his wishes in August 1945.

== Later life ==
Stevens became the assistant-commissioner of the Commonwealth Public Service Board in 1946, before being appointed the general manager and chief executive officer of the Overseas Telecommunications Commission in September 1946. He also kept an association with the Citizen Military Forces (CMF) as the commanding officer of the 2nd Division (1947–50) and for two months as the CMF member of the Military Board prior to being placed on the Reserve of Officers on 1 July 1950. In 1950, he was appointed Secretary of the Department of National Development and given responsibility for uranium mining at Rum Jungle, Northern Territory. He was later appointed as the Secretary of the Department of Supply in 1951 to oversee research and development. He organised agreements with the United Kingdom and the United States of America on atomic research issues, and during the atomic tests in Australia.

Stevens was appointed as the first chairman of the Australian Atomic Energy Commission (AAEC) in September 1952 to carry out research into atomic energy and enable access to overseas technology and secure technical co-operation. Under his leadership the AAEC established the experimental nuclear reactor at Lucas Heights, New South Wales. For his role he was appointed Knight Commander of the Order of the British Empire. Retiring from the government sector in 1956, he became chairman of Australian Electrical Industries Ltd and British Automotive Industries Pty Ltd, and a director of Commonwealth Industrial Gases Ltd, Custom Credit Corporation Ltd, Mount Isa Mines Ltd and the Trustees Executors & Agency Co. Ltd.

Stevens died of a coronary occlusion on 20 May 1969 in Sydney and was cremated. He was survived by his wife. His only child, Duncan Stevens, was the captain of HMAS Voyager and was killed during the collision with HMAS Melbourne on 10 February 1964.

Military offices
Preceded by Major General Francis Derham	General Officer Commanding 4th Division; April – August 1942	Succeeded by Major General John Murray
Preceded by Major General Edmund Herring	General Officer Commanding Northern Territory Force; 1942–1943	Succeeded by Major General Arthur Allen
Preceded by Major General Arthur Allen	General Officer Commanding 6th Division; 1943–1945	Succeeded by Major General Horace Robertson
Government offices
Preceded by Robert Jackson	Secretary of the Department of National Development; 1950–1951	Succeeded by Robert Jackson
Preceded by Harold Breen	Secretary of the Department of Supply; 1951–1953	Succeeded by Frank O'Connor
