= Department of Munitions and Supply =

Canadian federal ministry during World War II

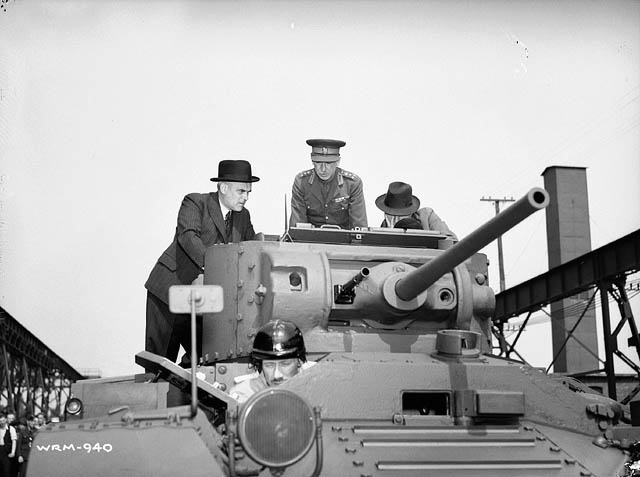
C D Howe (left) inspects the first tank to be manufactured in Canada on 27 May 1941, a Valentine Mark VI.

The Department of Munitions and Supply was the Canadian federal government ministry responsible for coordinating the domestic industry during World War II. It was created by the Department of Munitions and Supply Act with C.D. Howe as its minister. The department produced armaments for the war effort and regulated the use of gasoline, silk, and other strategic commodities in Canada to prioritize their use for war production.

Controllers — all of whom were members of the Wartime Industries Control Board — were appointed to regulate the war supply of key industrial sectors, including:

- timber,
- steel,
- other base metals,
- machine tools,
- oil, and
- power.

Canada's war production ranked fourth among the Allies by the war's end. By 1945, 70% of Canada's war production went to supply the Allies, and only 30% was needed for Canada's own military. Among the production was 815,729 military vehicles, including 45,710 armoured vehicles, many of which went to the British Eighth Army in North Africa and Italy.

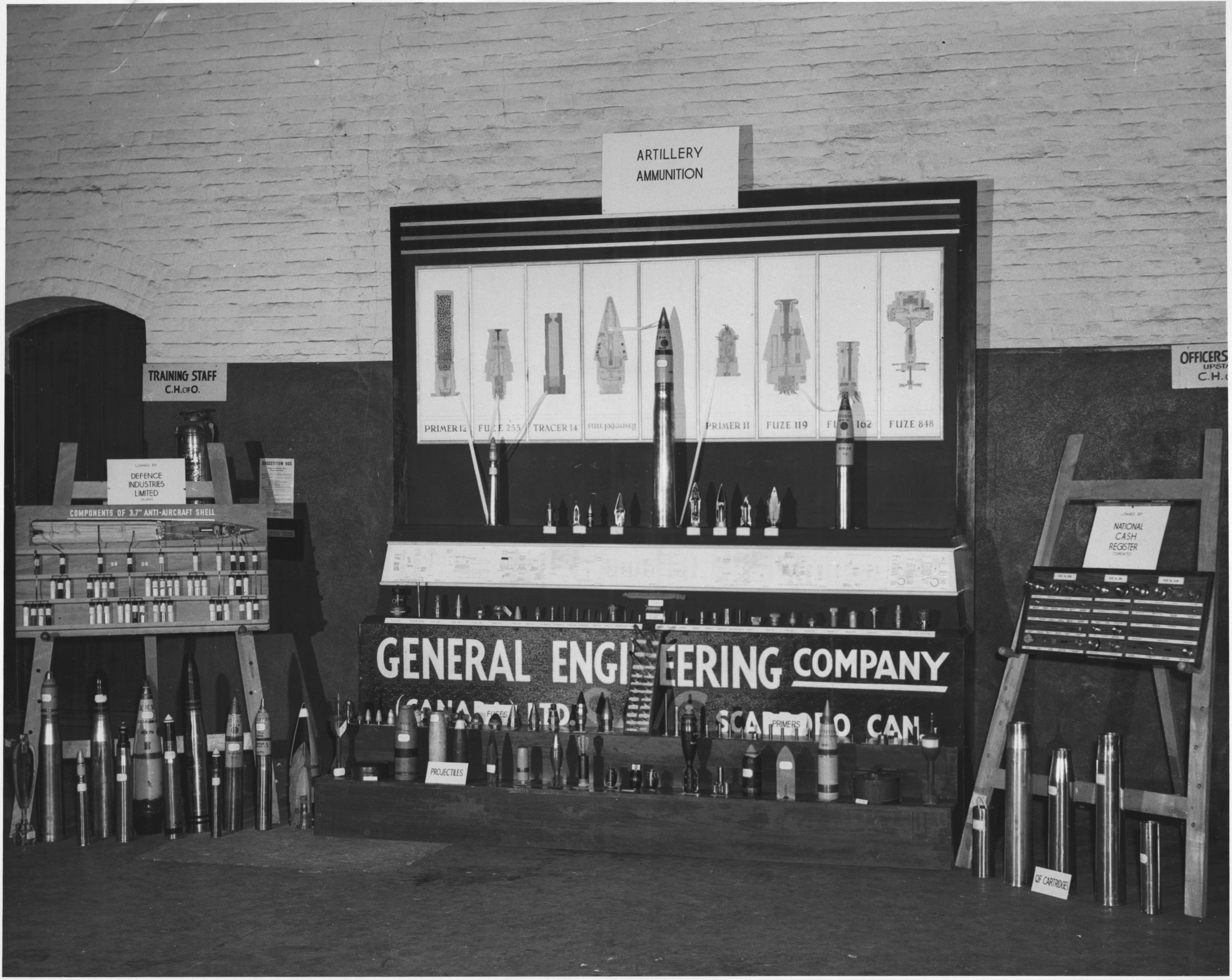
Display of artillery and ammunition produced by the General Engineering Company (Canada) and Defense Industries Limited (Ajax) munition factories. Both factories were commissioned by the Government of Canada.

The department established 28 crown corporations, including Polymer Corporation, that developed and produced synthetic rubber, Victory Aircraft for the production of bombers, and Research Enterprises. It coordinated all purchases made in Canada by British and other Allied governments for materials including military transport vehicles, tanks, cargo and military ships, aircraft, guns and small arms, ammunition and uniforms, minesweeping equipment, parachutes, firefighting equipment, and hospital supplies.

The department was dissolved at the conclusion of World War II, and most of its crown corporations were sold off. The remaining department duties were merged with those of the Department of Reconstruction to create the Department of Reconstruction and Supply. In 1951, a new Department of Defence Production was created, with Howe as its minister until 1957. The department existed until 1969 when it was abolished and replaced by the Department of Supply and Services.

== See also ==
- Imperial Munitions Board
- Small Arms Limited, Long Branch Arsenal, Crown Corporation under the department from 1940-1945 producing small firearms for use by Britain during World War Two.
