= George Fillmore Swain =

American civil engineer

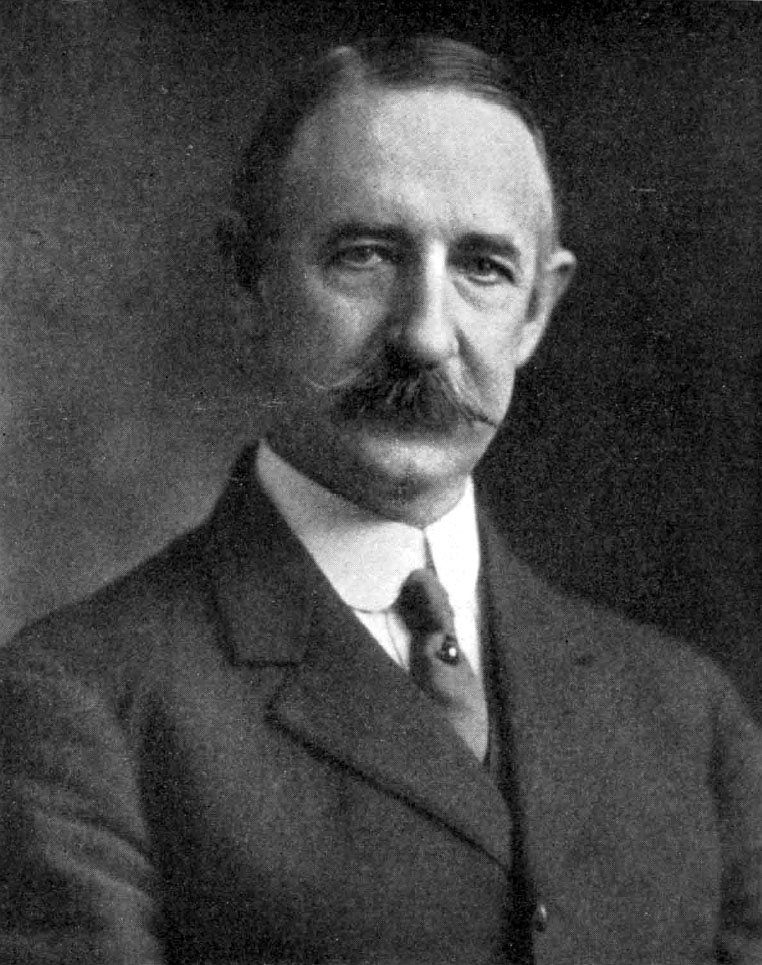
- Born: March 2, 1857; San Francisco, California, U.S.
- Died: July 1, 1931 (aged 74); Ashland, Massachusetts, U.S.
- Occupations: Professor, consulting engineer

Academic work
- Discipline: Civil engineering
- Institutions: MIT, Harvard

George Fillmore Swain (March 2, 1857 – July 1, 1931) was an American civil engineer and college professor. He held positions at Massachusetts Institute of Technology (MIT) and later at Harvard University.

== Biography ==
He was graduated at the Massachusetts Institute of Technology in 1877 and then studied in Berlin, German Empire, for three years. On his return to the United States, he settled in Boston. In 1887 he became professor of civil engineering at the Massachusetts Institute of Technology, which was then located in Boston. He remained at MIT until 1909, when he became professor of civil engineering at the Harvard Graduate School of Applied Science. He also served as consulting engineer of the Massachusetts Railroad Commission, and in 1894 became a member of the Boston Transit Commission, becoming its chairman in 1913.

== Works ==
- Notes on Hydraulics (1885)
- “Report on the Water Power of the Atlantic Watershed” in Vol. XVII of the Tenth United States Census
- Notes on Theory of Structures (1893)
- "Technical Education at the Massachusetts Institute of Technology" . Popular Science Monthly. Vol. 57. July 1900.
- Conservation of Water by Storage (1915)
- How to Study (1917)

== Archives and records ==
- George F. Swain papers at Baker Library Special Collections, Harvard Business School.
