= Department of Manufacturing Industry =

Australian government department, 1974–1975

Department overview
- Formed: 12 June 1974
- Preceding Department: Department of Secondary Industry
- Dissolved: 22 December 1975
- Superseding Department: Department of Administrative Services (I)
- Jurisdiction: Commonwealth of Australia
- Headquarters: Canberra
- Ministers responsible: Kep Enderby, Minister (1974–1975); Jim McClelland, Minister (1975); Lionel Bowen, Minister (1975); Bob Cotton, Minister (1975)
- Department executive: Neil Currie, Secretary

The Department of Manufacturing Industry was an Australian government department that existed between June 1974 and December 1975.

== History ==
When the Department of Manufacturing Industry was created in 1977, it was an amalgamation of the previous Department of Secondary Industry and the residual parts of the Department of Supply not incorporated in the amalgamated Department of Defence.

The department was abolished in 1975 and replaced with the Department of Administrative Services.

== Scope ==
Information about the department's functions and government funding allocation could be found in the Administrative Arrangements Orders, the annual Portfolio Budget Statements and in the Department's annual reports.

At its creation, the Department was responsible for the following:

- Secondary industry, including:
  - the efficiency and development of industries
- Research
- Defence research and development, including support of space research programs of international organisations
- Supply, manufacture and procurement of goods and services, including munitions and aircraft for defence
- Disposal of surplus goods
- Government transport and storage facilities in the state and storage and transport of goods in the Australian Capital Territory

== Structure ==
The Department was an Australian Public Service department, staffed by officials who were responsible to the Minister for Manufacturing Industry.
