= Electoral results for the Division of Maribyrnong =

Australian division election results

This is a list of electoral results for the Division of Maribyrnong in Australian federal elections from the division's creation in 1906 until the present.

== Members ==
Member	Party	Term
Samuel Mauger	Protectionist	1906–1909
Samuel Mauger	Liberal	1909–1910
James Fenton	Labor	1910–1931
James Fenton	Independent	1931–1931
James Fenton	United Australia	1931–1934
Arthur Drakeford	Labor	1934–1955
Philip Stokes	Liberal	1955–1969
Moss Cass	Labor	1969–1983
Alan Griffiths	Labor	1983–1996
Bob Sercombe	Labor	1996–2007
Bill Shorten	Labor	2007–2025
Jo Briskey	Labor	2025–present

== Election results ==
=== Elections in the 2020s ===
==== 2025 ====
2025 Australian federal election: Maribyrnong
Party	Candidate	Votes	%	±%
Labor	Jo Briskey	32,788	41.30	−0.60
Liberal	Tim Beddoe	24,491	30.85	+3.65
Greens	James Williams	16,892	21.28	+4.98
One Nation	Alannah Casey	5,212	6.57	+4.30
Total formal votes		79,383	97.11	+2.63
Informal votes		2,361	2.89	−2.63
Turnout		81,744	67.19	

Results are not final. Last updated on 3 May 2025 at 11:00 PM AEST.

==== 2022 ====
2022 Australian federal election: Maribyrnong
Party	Candidate	Votes	%	±%
Labor	Bill Shorten	39,792	42.35	−2.38
Liberal	Mira D'Silva	25,493	27.13	−7.64
Greens	Rhonda Pryor	15,278	16.26	+0.59
Liberal Democrats	Cameron Smith	3,577	3.81	+3.81
United Australia	Darren Besanko	3,433	3.65	+0.30
One Nation	Jodie Tindal	2,227	2.37	+2.37
Victorian Socialists	Daniel Dadich	1,837	1.95	+1.62
Great Australian	Mark Hobart	1,741	1.85	+1.85
Federation	Alexander Ansalone	590	0.63	+0.63
Total formal votes		93,968	95.03	−1.40
Informal votes		4,917	4.97	+1.40
Turnout		98,885	90.77	−2.73
Two-party-preferred result
Labor	Bill Shorten	58,679	62.45	+2.14
Liberal	Mira D'Silva	35,289	37.55	−2.14
Labor hold		Swing	+2.14	

Alluvial diagram for preference flows in the seat of Maribyrnong in the 2022 federal election. indicates at what stage the winning candidate had over 50% of the votes and was declared the winner.

=== Elections in the 2010s ===
==== 2019 ====
2019 Australian federal election: Maribyrnong
Party	Candidate	Votes	%	±%
Labor	Bill Shorten	47,487	47.05	+4.99
Liberal	Christine Stow	34,877	34.56	+0.83
Greens	James Williams	14,943	14.81	−2.42
United Australia	MD Sarwar Hasan	3,617	3.58	+3.58
Total formal votes		100,924	97.10	+1.07
Informal votes		3,014	2.90	−1.07
Turnout		103,938	92.09	+2.72
Two-party-preferred result
Labor	Bill Shorten	61,767	61.20	+0.80
Liberal	Christine Stow	39,157	38.80	−0.80
Labor hold		Swing	+0.80	

==== 2016 ====
2016 Australian federal election: Maribyrnong
Party	Candidate	Votes	%	±%
Labor	Bill Shorten	47,402	50.52	+2.62
Liberal	Ted Hatzakortzian	30,283	32.27	−0.76
Greens	Olivia Ball	9,151	9.75	−0.15
Independent	Catherine Cumming	3,172	3.38	+3.38
Animal Justice	Fiona McRostie	2,176	2.32	+2.32
Christians	Anthony O'Neill	1,650	1.76	+0.77
Total formal votes		93,834	95.36	+1.54
Informal votes		4,568	4.64	−1.54
Turnout		98,402	89.22	−2.32
Two-party-preferred result
Labor	Bill Shorten	58,465	62.31	+0.92
Liberal	Ted Hatzakortzian	35,369	37.69	−0.92
Labor hold		Swing	+0.92	

==== 2013 ====
2013 Australian federal election: Maribyrnong
Party	Candidate	Votes	%	±%
Labor	Bill Shorten	43,162	47.90	−7.67
Liberal	Ted Hatzakortzian	29,767	33.03	+4.44
Greens	Richard Keech	8,920	9.90	−2.01
Palmer United	Philip Cutler	2,470	2.74	+2.74
Sex Party	Amy Myers	2,313	2.57	+2.57
Democratic Labour	Marguerita Kavanagh	1,258	1.40	+1.40
Family First	Hayleigh Carlson	944	1.05	−1.81
Christians	Joe Paterno	888	0.99	+0.99
Rise Up Australia	Jeff Truscott	395	0.44	+0.44
Total formal votes		90,117	93.82	−0.56
Informal votes		5,940	6.18	+0.56
Turnout		96,057	91.56	−0.08
Two-party-preferred result
Labor	Bill Shorten	55,320	61.39	−6.10
Liberal	Ted Hatzakortzian	34,797	38.61	+6.10
Labor hold		Swing	−6.10	

==== 2010 ====
2010 Australian federal election: Maribyrnong
Party	Candidate	Votes	%	±%
Labor	Bill Shorten	42,404	55.38	−2.19
Liberal	Conrad D'Souza	22,262	29.07	−0.95
Greens	Tim Long	9,077	11.85	+5.03
Family First	Colin Moyle	1,988	2.60	+0.02
Democrats	Robert Livesay	841	1.10	−0.47
Total formal votes		76,572	94.32	−1.70
Informal votes		4,607	5.68	+1.70
Turnout		81,179	91.82	−2.33
Two-party-preferred result
Labor	Bill Shorten	51,193	66.86	+1.54
Liberal	Conrad D'Souza	25,379	33.14	−1.54
Labor hold		Swing	+1.54	

=== Elections in the 2000s ===
==== 2007 ====
2007 Australian federal election: Maribyrnong
Party	Candidate	Votes	%	±%
Labor	Bill Shorten	45,528	57.57	+6.24
Liberal	Ian Soylemez	23,741	30.02	−7.48
Greens	Bob Muntz	5,396	6.82	−0.04
Family First	Ian Keeling	2,039	2.58	+0.73
Democrats	Robert Livesay	1,242	1.57	−0.05
Citizens Electoral Council	Andre Kozlowski	1,141	1.44	+0.60
Total formal votes		79,087	96.02	+0.88
Informal votes		3,277	3.98	−0.88
Turnout		82,364	94.15	+0.11
Two-party-preferred result
Labor	Bill Shorten	51,657	65.32	+5.85
Liberal	Ian Soylemez	27,430	34.68	−5.85
Labor hold		Swing	+5.85	

==== 2004 ====
2004 Australian federal election: Maribyrnong
Party	Candidate	Votes	%	±%
Labor	Bob Sercombe	40,075	51.33	−5.38
Liberal	Conrad D'Souza	29,281	37.50	+7.51
Greens	Bob Muntz	5,358	6.86	+2.17
Family First	David Holt	1,443	1.85	+1.85
Democrats	Robert Livesay	1,261	1.62	−4.90
Citizens Electoral Council	Andre Kozlowski	656	0.84	−0.94
Total formal votes		78,074	95.14	+0.18
Informal votes		3,989	4.86	−0.18
Turnout		82,063	94.04	−0.42
Two-party-preferred result
Labor	Bob Sercombe	46,431	59.47	−5.96
Liberal	Conrad D'Souza	31,643	40.53	+5.96
Labor hold		Swing	−5.96	

==== 2001 ====
2001 Australian federal election: Maribyrnong
Party	Candidate	Votes	%	±%
Labor	Bob Sercombe	44,825	59.91	−4.75
Liberal	Grahame Barclay	20,705	27.67	+3.25
Democrats	Charles Williams	4,567	6.10	+1.48
Greens	Jules Beckwith	2,878	3.85	+1.36
Citizens Electoral Council	Andre Kozlowski	1,840	2.46	+0.64
Total formal votes		74,815	94.55	−0.97
Informal votes		4,309	5.45	+0.97
Turnout		79,124	94.71	
Two-party-preferred result
Labor	Bob Sercombe	50,410	67.38	−4.68
Liberal	Grahame Barclay	24,405	32.62	+4.68
Labor hold		Swing	−4.68	

=== Elections in the 1990s ===
==== 1998 ====
1998 Australian federal election: Maribyrnong
Party	Candidate	Votes	%	±%
Labor	Bob Sercombe	48,458	64.66	+1.96
Liberal	Will Charlton	18,305	24.43	−2.90
Democrats	Helen Martin	3,469	4.63	−0.36
Greens	Tony Camilleri	1,867	2.49	+2.49
Citizens Electoral Council	Paul Gallagher	1,366	1.82	+1.82
Unity	Diana Kalantzis	1,203	1.61	+1.61
Natural Law	Paul Treacy	273	0.36	−0.30
Total formal votes		74,941	95.53	+0.12
Informal votes		3,508	4.47	−0.12
Turnout		78,449	95.43	−0.55
Two-party-preferred result
Labor	Bob Sercombe	53,999	72.06	+3.20
Liberal	Will Charlton	20,942	27.94	−3.20
Labor hold		Swing	+3.20	

==== 1996 ====
1996 Australian federal election: Maribyrnong
Party	Candidate	Votes	%	±%
Labor	Bob Sercombe	45,755	62.70	−2.19
Liberal	Georgi Stickels	19,938	27.32	−2.03
Democrats	Peter Rechner	3,644	4.99	+1.69
Independent	Helen van den Berg	2,046	2.80	+2.80
Independent	Brendan Griffin	1,105	1.51	+1.51
Natural Law	Peter Jackson	485	0.66	−0.18
Total formal votes		72,973	95.41	−1.01
Informal votes		3,512	4.59	+1.01
Turnout		76,485	95.98	−0.31
Two-party-preferred result
Labor	Bob Sercombe	50,097	68.85	+0.00
Liberal	Georgi Stickels	22,665	31.15	+0.00
Labor hold		Swing	+0.00	

==== 1993 ====
1993 Australian federal election: Maribyrnong
Party	Candidate	Votes	%	±%
Labor	Alan Griffiths	47,161	65.09	+16.45
Liberal	Maureen Hopper	21,146	29.19	−9.17
Democrats	Frances McKay	2,407	3.32	−9.69
	George Marinkovic	1,126	1.55	+1.55
Natural Law	John Bell	614	0.85	+0.85
Total formal votes		72,454	96.48	+2.53
Informal votes		2,647	3.52	−2.53
Turnout		75,101	96.29	
Two-party-preferred result
Labor	Alan Griffiths	49,765	68.72	+11.51
Liberal	Maureen Hopper	22,649	31.28	−11.51
Labor hold		Swing	+11.51	

==== 1990 ====
1990 Australian federal election: Maribyrnong
Party	Candidate	Votes	%	±%
Labor	Alan Griffiths	32,235	48.6	−11.4
Liberal	Victor Rudewych	25,419	38.4	+8.2
Democrats	Frances McKay	8,632	13.0	+6.4
Total formal votes		66,277	93.9	
Informal votes		4,268	6.1	
Turnout		70,545	95.8	
Two-party-preferred result
Labor	Alan Griffiths	37,894	57.2	−7.4
Liberal	Victor Rudewych	28,344	42.8	+7.4
Labor hold		Swing	−7.4	

=== Elections in the 1980s ===
==== 1987 ====
1987 Australian federal election: Maribyrnong
Party	Candidate	Votes	%	±%
Labor	Alan Griffiths	31,502	52.6	−2.0
Liberal	Victor Rudewych	22,505	37.6	+2.3
Democrats	David Mackay	3,940	6.6	+2.3
Democratic Labor	Mark Beshara	1,898	3.2	−1.2
Total formal votes		59,845	93.3	
Informal votes		4,279	6.7	
Turnout		64,124	95.5	
Two-party-preferred result
Labor	Alan Griffiths	34,252	57.2	−3.2
Liberal	Victor Rudewych	25,584	42.8	+3.2
Labor hold		Swing	−3.2	

==== 1984 ====
1984 Australian federal election: Maribyrnong
Party	Candidate	Votes	%	±%
Labor	Alan Griffiths	31,684	54.6	−2.8
Liberal	Sally Gooch	20,441	35.3	+3.1
Democratic Labor	Rosemary Maurus	2,577	4.4	+4.4
Democrats	Kathie Gizycki	2,466	4.3	−1.7
Socialist Workers	Helen Said	564	1.0	−1.7
Independent	Richard Wright	249	0.4	+0.4
Total formal votes		57,981	89.4	
Informal votes		6,863	10.6	
Turnout		64,844	95.8	
Two-party-preferred result
Labor	Alan Griffiths	34,993	60.4	−4.2
Liberal	Sally Gooch	22,967	39.6	+4.2
Labor hold		Swing	−4.2	

==== 1983 ====
1983 Australian federal election: Maribyrnong
Party	Candidate	Votes	%	±%
Labor	Alan Griffiths	41,924	56.6	+2.0
Liberal	Geoffrey Ireland	24,400	33.0	−2.1
Democrats	Henrik Jersic	4,452	6.0	−4.2
Socialist Workers	Peter Beharell	2,420	3.3	+3.3
Australia	Richard Wright	844	1.1	+1.1
Total formal votes		74,040	97.4	
Informal votes		2,001	2.6	
Turnout		76,041	96.7	
Two-party-preferred result
Labor	Alan Griffiths		63.8	+3.1
Liberal	Geoffrey Ireland		36.2	−3.1
Labor hold		Swing	+3.1	

==== 1980 ====
1980 Australian federal election: Maribyrnong
Party	Candidate	Votes	%	±%
Labor	Moss Cass	37,991	54.6	+11.0
Liberal	Geoffrey Ireland	24,439	35.1	−1.6
Democrats	Henrik Jersic	7,129	10.2	−3.3
Total formal votes		69,559	97.4	
Informal votes		1,880	2.6	
Turnout		71,439	96.2	
Two-party-preferred result
Labor	Moss Cass		60.7	+8.7
Liberal	Geoffrey Ireland		39.3	−8.7
Labor hold		Swing	+8.7	

=== Elections in the 1970s ===
==== 1977 ====
1977 Australian federal election: Maribyrnong
Party	Candidate	Votes	%	±%
Labor	Moss Cass	27,927	43.6	−4.1
Liberal	Philip Fitzherbert	23,560	36.7	−7.1
Democrats	Alan Brass	8,651	13.5	+13.5
Democratic Labor	Alan Tait	3,982	6.2	+0.6
Total formal votes		64,120	96.8	
Informal votes		2,137	3.2	
Turnout		66,257	97.0	
Two-party-preferred result
Labor	Moss Cass	33,313	52.0	+1.7
Liberal	Philip Fitzherbert	30,807	48.0	−1.7
Labor hold		Swing	+1.7	

==== 1975 ====
1975 Australian federal election: Maribyrnong
Party	Candidate	Votes	%	±%
Labor	Moss Cass	29,528	49.5	−7.2
Liberal	John Gray	25,090	42.0	+9.2
Democratic Labor	Lucia Hayward	3,363	5.6	−3.1
Australia	Thomas Archay	1,700	2.8	+0.9
Total formal votes		59,681	97.4	
Informal votes		1,604	2.6	
Turnout		61,285	97.1	
Two-party-preferred result
Labor	Moss Cass		52.1	−6.6
Liberal	John Gray		47.9	+6.6
Labor hold		Swing	−6.6	

==== 1974 ====
1974 Australian federal election: Maribyrnong
Party	Candidate	Votes	%	±%
Labor	Moss Cass	33,393	56.7	+6.8
Liberal	Rex Webb	19,306	32.8	−0.3
Democratic Labor	Paul McManus	5,136	8.7	−3.2
Australia	John Watson	1,094	1.9	−0.8
Total formal votes		58,929	97.4	
Informal votes		1,587	2.6	
Turnout		60,516	96.9	
Two-party-preferred result
Labor	Moss Cass		58.7	+4.5
Liberal	Rex Webb		41.3	−4.5
Labor hold		Swing	+4.5	

==== 1972 ====
1972 Australian federal election: Maribyrnong
Party	Candidate	Votes	%	±%
Labor	Moss Cass	26,410	49.9	+3.7
Liberal	Rex Webb	17,529	33.1	−2.4
Democratic Labor	Paul McManus	6,301	11.9	−0.5
Australia	Gary Scholes	1,432	2.7	+2.7
Defence of Government Schools	Lance Hutchinson	1,114	2.1	−3.1
National Socialist	Katrina Young	148	0.3	+0.3
Total formal votes		52,934	96.1	
Informal votes		2,154	3.9	
Turnout		55,088	96.3	
Two-party-preferred result
Labor	Moss Cass		54.2	+3.0
Liberal	Rex Webb		45.8	−3.0
Labor hold		Swing	+3.0	

=== Elections in the 1960s ===
==== 1969 ====
1969 Australian federal election: Maribyrnong
Party	Candidate	Votes	%	±%
Labor	Moss Cass	23,191	46.2	+10.3
Liberal	Philip Stokes	17,835	35.5	−5.9
Democratic Labor	Jim Marmion	6,246	12.4	−3.8
Independent	Lance Hutchinson	2,626	5.2	−1.3
Independent	Daphne Thorne	343	0.7	+0.7
Total formal votes		50,241	95.4	
Informal votes		2,414	4.6	
Turnout		52,655	95.5	
Two-party-preferred result
Labor	Moss Cass		51.4	+8.0
Liberal	Philip Stokes		48.6	−8.0
Labor gain from Liberal		Swing	+8.0	

==== 1966 ====
1966 Australian federal election: Maribyrnong
Party	Candidate	Votes	%	±%
Liberal	Philip Stokes	17,888	42.4	+1.8
Labor	John O'Brien	14,715	34.9	−8.4
Democratic Labor	Barry O'Brien	6,822	16.2	+0.7
Independent	Lance Hutchinson	2,734	6.5	+6.5
Total formal votes		42,159	96.1	
Informal votes		1,721	3.9	
Turnout		43,880	95.9	
Two-party-preferred result
Liberal	Philip Stokes	24,300	57.6	+2.4
Labor	John O'Brien	17,859	42.4	−2.4
Liberal hold		Swing	+2.4	

==== 1963 ====
1963 Australian federal election: Maribyrnong
Party	Candidate	Votes	%	±%
Labor	Neil Armour	18,524	43.3	−3.5
Liberal	Philip Stokes	17,379	40.6	+5.8
Democratic Labor	Frank McManus	6,616	15.5	−1.9
Independent	Edwin Ryan	162	0.4	+0.4
Republican	John Murray	141	0.3	+0.3
Total formal votes		42,822	98.0	
Informal votes		865	2.0	
Turnout		43,687	97.1	
Two-party-preferred result
Liberal	Philip Stokes	23,617	55.2	+4.4
Labor	Neil Armour	19,205	44.8	−4.4
Liberal hold		Swing	+4.4	

==== 1961 ====
1961 Australian federal election: Maribyrnong
Party	Candidate	Votes	%	±%
Labor	Neil Armour	20,022	46.8	−0.5
Liberal	Philip Stokes	14,868	34.8	−2.1
Democratic Labor	Paul Gunn	7,438	17.4	+1.6
Centre	Norman McClure	413	1.0	+1.0
Total formal votes		42,741	97.5	
Informal votes		1,112	2.5	
Turnout		43,853	96.5	
Two-party-preferred result
Liberal	Philip Stokes	21,721	50.8	+0.0
Labor	Neil Armour	21,020	49.2	+0.0
Liberal hold		Swing	+0.0	

=== Elections in the 1950s ===
==== 1958 ====
1958 Australian federal election: Maribyrnong
Party	Candidate	Votes	%	±%
Labor	Doug Elliot	19,917	47.3	+0.2
Liberal	Philip Stokes	15,548	36.9	−0.5
Democratic Labor	Paul Gunn	6,646	15.8	+0.4
Total formal votes		42,111	98.2	
Informal votes		763	1.8	
Turnout		42,874	97.0	
Two-party-preferred result
Liberal	Philip Stokes	21,402	50.8	+0.7
Labor	Doug Elliot	20,709	49.2	−0.7
Liberal hold		Swing	+0.7	

==== 1955 ====
1955 Australian federal election: Maribyrnong
Party	Candidate	Votes	%	±%
Labor	Arthur Drakeford	19,014	47.1	−9.6
Liberal	Philip Stokes	15,099	37.4	−5.1
Labor (A-C)	David Purcell	6,217	15.4	+15.4
Total formal votes		40,330	97.6	
Informal votes		1,010	2.4	
Turnout		41,340	94.4	
Two-party-preferred result
Liberal	Philip Stokes	20,222	50.1	+7.5
Labor	Arthur Drakeford	20,108	49.9	−7.5
Liberal gain from Labor		Swing	+7.5	

==== 1954 ====
1954 Australian federal election: Maribyrnong
Party	Candidate	Votes	%	±%
Labor	Arthur Drakeford	27,647	64.2	−0.1
Liberal	Stuart Collie	14,502	33.7	−2.0
Communist	Frank Johnson	889	2.1	+2.1
Total formal votes		43,038	98.7	
Informal votes		553	1.3	
Turnout		43,591	95.8	
Two-party-preferred result
Labor	Arthur Drakeford		66.1	+1.8
Liberal	Stuart Collie		33.9	−1.8
Labor hold		Swing	+1.8	

==== 1951 ====
1951 Australian federal election: Maribyrnong
Party	Candidate	Votes	%	±%
Labor	Arthur Drakeford	27,963	64.3	+2.4
Liberal	Stuart Collie	15,502	35.7	+1.6
Total formal votes		43,465	98.5	
Informal votes		661	1.5	
Turnout		44,126	96.9	
Labor hold		Swing	+0.3	

=== Elections in the 1940s ===
==== 1949 ====
1949 Australian federal election: Maribyrnong
Party	Candidate	Votes	%	±%
Labor	Arthur Drakeford	26,639	61.9	−1.1
Liberal	George Hannan	14,675	34.1	−2.9
Prot. Christian Dem.	Colin Neyland	1,751	4.1	+4.1
Total formal votes		43,065	98.6	
Informal votes		603	1.4	
Turnout		43,668	97.1	
Two-party-preferred result
Labor	Arthur Drakeford		64.0	+1.0
Liberal	George Hannan		36.0	−1.0
Labor hold		Swing	+1.0	

==== 1946 ====
1946 Australian federal election: Maribyrnong
Party	Candidate	Votes	%	±%
Labor	Arthur Drakeford	48,424	65.8	−1.8
Liberal	Adrian Cole	25,155	34.2	+34.2
Total formal votes		73,579	98.3	
Informal votes		1,297	1.7	
Turnout		74,876	95.7	
Labor hold		Swing	−8.7	

==== 1943 ====
1943 Australian federal election: Maribyrnong
Party	Candidate	Votes	%	±%
Labor	Arthur Drakeford	48,441	67.6	+3.0
United Australia	Albert Pennell	14,469	20.2	−15.2
Christian CM	Charles Woollacott	7,478	10.4	+10.4
Independent Labor	Kenneth Kenafick	1,254	1.8	+1.8
Total formal votes		71,642	97.8	
Informal votes		1,640	2.2	
Turnout		73,282	97.5	
Two-party-preferred result
Labor	Arthur Drakeford		74.5	+9.9
United Australia	Albert Pennell		25.5	−9.9
Labor hold		Swing	+9.9	

==== 1940 ====
1940 Australian federal election: Maribyrnong
Party	Candidate	Votes	%	±%
Labor	Arthur Drakeford	40,990	64.6	+2.3
United Australia	Robert Vroland	22,455	35.4	+0.5
Total formal votes		63,445	98.3	
Informal votes		1,124	1.7	
Turnout		64,569	95.9	
Labor hold		Swing	+0.9	

=== Elections in the 1930s ===
==== 1937 ====
1937 Australian federal election: Maribyrnong
Party	Candidate	Votes	%	±%
Labor	Arthur Drakeford	37,111	62.3	+12.5
United Australia	Malcolm Fenton	20,799	34.9	−6.1
Independent	Edward Turner	1,703	2.9	+2.9
Total formal votes		59,613	97.7	
Informal votes		1,376	2.3	
Turnout		60,989	97.8	
Two-party-preferred result
Labor	Arthur Drakeford		63.7	+6.0
United Australia	Malcolm Fenton		36.3	−6.0
Labor hold		Swing	+6.0	

==== 1934 ====
1934 Australian federal election: Maribyrnong
Party	Candidate	Votes	%	±%
Labor	Arthur Drakeford	27,485	49.8	+1.2
United Australia	James Fenton	22,648	41.0	−8.3
Social Credit	Alexander Amess	2,773	5.0	+5.0
Communist	Jack Blake	2,300	4.2	+4.2
Total formal votes		55,206	95.9	
Informal votes		2,336	4.1	
Turnout		57,542	96.6	
Two-party-preferred result
Labor	Arthur Drakeford		56.7	+7.1
United Australia	James Fenton		43.3	−7.1
Labor gain from United Australia		Swing	+7.1	

==== 1931 ====
1931 Australian federal election: Maribyrnong
Party	Candidate	Votes	%	±%
United Australia	James Fenton	26,605	49.3	+22.5
Labor	William Beckett	26,242	48.6	−24.6
Democratic	William Scott	1,094	2.0	+2.0
Total formal votes		53,941	97.5	
Informal votes		1,358	2.5	
Turnout		55,299	98.1	
Two-party-preferred result
United Australia	James Fenton	27,195	50.4	+23.6
Labor	William Beckett	26,746	49.6	−23.6
United Australia gain from Labor		Swing	+23.6	

=== Elections in the 1920s ===
==== 1929 ====
1929 Australian federal election: Maribyrnong
Party	Candidate	Votes	%	±%
Labor	James Fenton	39,409	73.2	+13.3
Nationalist	Percy Anderson	14,441	26.8	−13.3
Total formal votes		53,850	98.6	
Informal votes		740	1.4	
Turnout		54,590	97.7	
Labor hold		Swing	+13.3	

==== 1928 ====
1928 Australian federal election: Maribyrnong
Party	Candidate	Votes	%	±%
Labor	James Fenton	31,022	59.9	+0.4
Nationalist	Arthur Fenton	20,765	40.1	−0.4
Total formal votes		51,787	97.0	
Informal votes		1,614	3.0	
Turnout		53,401	97.6	
Labor hold		Swing	+0.4	

==== 1925 ====
1925 Australian federal election: Maribyrnong
Party	Candidate	Votes	%	±%
Labor	James Fenton	28,621	59.5	−3.7
Nationalist	Thomas White	19,483	40.5	+3.7
Total formal votes		48,104	99.0	
Informal votes		496	1.0	
Turnout		48,600	93.6	
Labor hold		Swing	−3.7	

==== 1922 ====
1922 Australian federal election: Maribyrnong
Party	Candidate	Votes	%	±%
Labor	James Fenton	17,153	63.2	+9.7
Nationalist	James Stephens	9,976	36.8	−9.7
Total formal votes		27,129	97.7	
Informal votes		636	2.3	
Turnout		27,765	62.0	
Labor hold		Swing	+9.7	

=== Elections in the 1910s ===
==== 1919 ====
1919 Australian federal election: Maribyrnong
Party	Candidate	Votes	%	±%
Labor	James Fenton	20,165	52.1	−0.1
Nationalist	Arthur Thompson	18,509	47.9	+0.1
Total formal votes		38,674	98.8	
Informal votes		467	1.2	
Turnout		39,141	78.2	
Labor hold		Swing	−0.1	

==== 1917 ====
1917 Australian federal election: Maribyrnong
Party	Candidate	Votes	%	±%
Labor	James Fenton	20,156	52.2	−12.1
Nationalist	Edmund Jowett	18,483	47.8	+12.1
Total formal votes		38,639	98.3	
Informal votes		675	1.7	
Turnout		39,314	84.7	
Labor hold		Swing	−12.1	

==== 1914 ====
1914 Australian federal election: Maribyrnong
Party	Candidate	Votes	%	±%
Labor	James Fenton	20,834	64.3	+3.5
Liberal	Edward Reynolds	11,574	35.7	−3.5
Total formal votes		32,408	98.2	
Informal votes		583	1.8	
Turnout		32,991	72.4	
Labor hold		Swing	+3.5	

==== 1913 ====
1913 Australian federal election: Maribyrnong
Party	Candidate	Votes	%	±%
Labor	James Fenton	18,906	60.8	+6.4
Liberal	James Hume Cook	12,210	39.2	−6.4
Total formal votes		31,116	98.2	
Informal votes		583	1.8	
Turnout		31,699	77.7	
Labor hold		Swing	+6.4	

==== 1910 ====
1910 Australian federal election: Maribyrnong
Party	Candidate	Votes	%	±%
Labour	James Fenton	16,284	60.8	+17.7
Liberal	Samuel Mauger	10,496	39.2	−17.7
Total formal votes		26,780	98.6	
Informal votes		372	1.4	
Turnout		27,152	71.7	
Labour gain from Liberal		Swing	+17.7	

=== Elections in the 1900s ===
==== 1906 ====
1906 Australian federal election: Maribyrnong
Party	Candidate	Votes	%	±%
Protectionist	Samuel Mauger	11,109	56.9	
Labour	Clement Davidson	8,407	43.1	
Total formal votes		19,516	95.9	
Informal votes		839	4.1	
Turnout		20,355	60.9	
Protectionist win		(new seat)		
