= Department of Communications (1980–1987) =

Australian government department, 1980–1987

Department overview
- Formed: 3 November 1980
- Preceding Department: Postal and Telecommunications Department
- Dissolved: 24 July 1987
- Superseding Department: Department of Transport and Communications
- Jurisdiction: Commonwealth of Australia
- Ministers responsible: Ian McCahon Sinclair, (1980–1982); Neil Anthony Brown, (1982–1983); Michael John Duff, (1983–1987)
- Department executives: Bob Lansdown, Secretary (1980–1986); Charles Halton, Secretary (1986–1987)

The Department of Communications was an Australian government department that existed between November 1980 and July 1987.

== Scope ==
Information about the department's functions and government funding allocation could be found in the Administrative Arrangements Orders, the annual Portfolio Budget Statements and in the Department's annual reports.

At its creation, the Department was responsible for postal, telegraphic, telephonic and other like services including television and radio.

== Structure ==
The Department was an Australian Public Service department, staffed by officials who were responsible to the Minister for Communications. The Secretaries of the Department were Bob Lansdown (from the Department's creation until 31 January 1986) and Charles Halton (from 1 February 1986).
