= Department of the Media =

Australian government department, 1972–1975

Department overview
- Formed: 19 December 1972
- Preceding Department: Department of the Environment, Aborigines and the Arts – for film industry, government printing, publishing, advertising Department of the Interior (II) – for government publicity and information Postmaster-General's Department – for radio broadcasting and television; Australian Broadcasting Commission
- Dissolved: 22 December 1975
- Superseding Department: Postal and Telecommunications Department – for electronic media Department of Administrative Services (II) – for information, printing and publishing Department of the Prime Minister and Cabinet – for film making and development of the film industry
- Jurisdiction: Commonwealth of Australia
- Headquarters: Canberra
- Ministers responsible: Doug McClelland, Minister (1972–1975); Moss Cass, Minister (1975); Reg Withers, Minister (1975)
- Department executives: Ebor Lane, Acting Secretary (1972–1973); James Oswin, Secretary (1973–1975); James Spigelman, Secretary (1975)

The Department of the Media was an Australian government department that existed between December 1972 and December 1975.

== History ==
The Department was one of several new Departments established by the Whitlam government, a wide restructuring that revealed some of the new government's program. The Department was dissolved shortly after the Dismissal. It was replaced by the Postal and Telecommunications Department, representing a joining of the Department of the Media and the Postmaster-General's Department.

== Scope ==
Information about the department's functions and government funding allocation could be found in the Administrative Arrangements Orders, the annual Portfolio Budget Statements and in the Department's annual reports.

According to the Administrative Arrangements Order issued 19 December 1972, at its creation, the Department was responsible for:

- Matters related to the news, information and entertainment media
- Film-making and development of the film industry
- Government publicity and information
- Government printing, publishing and advertising.

== Structure ==
The Department was an Australian Public Service department, staffed by officials who were responsible to the Minister for the Media, initially Doug McClelland (until June 1975), then Moss Cass (as part of a ministerial reshuffle in June 1975), and finally Reg Withers as a caretaker Minister for the month leading up to the December 1975 election (after the 11 November 1975 Dismissal in which the Governor-General appointed Leader of the Opposition, Malcolm Fraser, as caretaker Prime Minister).

=== Secretary role ===
Department officials were headed by a Secretary, initially (acting in the position) Ebor Lane (until January 1973) and then James Oswin (from January 1973 to the end of 1975). Gough Whitlam had initially offered the Secretary position to Talbot Duckmanton in January 1973, but Duckmanton was uncertain what the Department was supposed to do. After Oswin left the position in June 1975, he was replaced by James Spigelman, a 29-year-old who had previously been employed as the Prime Minister's Principal Private Secretary, the third person Whitlam had appointed as a Permanent Head of an Australian Government Department after time in that role.

== References and further reading ==
- Inglis, Kenneth Stanley (1983), This is the ABC: The Australian Broadcasting Commission 1932–1983
