= Department of Urban and Regional Development =

Australian government department, 1972–1975

Department overview
- Formed: 19 December 1972
- Preceding Department: Department of the Interior (II) - for National Capital Development Commission Department of the Prime Minister and Cabinet - for National Urban and Regional Development Authority Act 1972
- Dissolved: 22 December 1975
- Superseding Department: Department of Environment, Housing and Community Development - for urban and regional planning and development Department of Administrative Services (II) - for property and survey Department of the Capital Territory - for National Capital Development Commission
- Jurisdiction: Commonwealth of Australia
- Ministers responsible: Tom Uren, Minister (1972‑1975); John Carrick, Minister (1975)
- Department executive: Bob Lansdown, Secretary

The Department of Urban and Regional Development was an Australian government department that existed between December 1972 and December 1975.

== History ==
The Department was one of several new departments established by the Whitlam government, in a wide restructuring that revealed some of the new government's program. When the Fraser government took office in November 1975 following the 1975 Australian constitutional crisis, the Department was abolished.

== Scope ==
Information about the department's functions and government funding allocation could be found in the Administrative Arrangements Orders, the annual Portfolio Budget Statements and in the Department's annual reports.

At its creation, the Department's functions were described as "matters related to city and regional planning and development, including assistance to, and co-operation with, the States and local-governing bodies".

== Structure ==
The Department was a Commonwealth Public Service department, staffed by officials who were responsible to the Minister for Urban and Regional Development. Hugh Stretton, urban planning and economic author and academic, was employed in the Department and had significant influence on its policies.

== Abolition ==
The Department was officially abolished on 22 December 1975, shortly after the election of the Fraser Coalition Government. The Coalition election campaign had emphasised fiscal restraint, expenditure reduction, and moving away from Whitlam-era interventionist urban programs. The Department was superseded by the Department of Environment, Housing and Community Development, which itself was dissolved in December 1978.
