= Department of Environment and Conservation (Australia) =

Australian government department, 1972–1975

Department overview
- Formed: 19 December 1972
- Preceding Department: Department of the Environment, Aborigines and the Arts Department of National Development (I)
- Dissolved: 21 April 1975
- Superseding Department: Department of Housing and Construction (I) Department of the Environment (I)
- Jurisdiction: Commonwealth of Australia
- Headquarters: Canberra
- Minister responsible: Moss Cass
- Department executives: Lenox Hewitt, Secretary (1972–1973); Don McMichael, Secretary (1973–1975)

The Department of Environment and Conservation was an Australian government department that existed between December 1972 and April 1975.

== History ==
The Department was one of several new Departments established by the Whitlam government, a wide restructuring that revealed some of the new government's program.

The Department was abolished in April 1975, to be replaced by the Department of the Environment. At the time, Prime Minister Gough Whitlam said that the reason for the re‑badging was that the name "Department of Environment and Conservation" suggested that conservation was a separate matter from the environment, whereas it was in fact a major component of the Government's total environment program.

The renaming was requested by environment minister Moss Cass, who said the title was too long and redundant.

== Scope ==
Information about the department's functions and government funding allocation could be found in the Administrative Arrangements Orders, the annual Portfolio Budget Statements and in the Department's annual reports.

According to the Administrative Arrangements Order issued 19 December 1972, at its creation, the Department was responsible for activities related to:

- Environment and conservation—
  - Water, including the protection and use of water resources
  - National Parks

== Structure ==
The Department was an Australian Public Service department, staffed by officials who were responsible to the Minister for Environment and Conservation.
