= Department of the Cabinet Office =

Australian government department, 1968–1971

Department overview
- Formed: 11 March 1968
- Dissolved: 12 March 1971
- Superseding Department: Department of the Prime Minister and Cabinet
- Jurisdiction: Commonwealth of Australia
- Minister responsible: John Gorton, Prime Minister of Australia
- Department executive: John Bunting, Secretary

The Department of the Cabinet Office was an Australian government department that existed between March 1968 and March 1971.

== Scope ==
Information about the department's functions and government funding allocation could be found in the Administrative Arrangements Orders, the annual Portfolio Budget Statements and in the department's annual reports.

The role of the Department of the Cabinet Office was to service the Cabinet and Cabinet Committee, thus assisting the Prime Minister in the expeditious ordering of Cabinet business and proceedings and ensuring Cabinet decisions were implemented promptly and efficiently.

== Structure ==
The department was a Commonwealth Public Service department, staffed by officials who were responsible to the Prime Minister of Australia of the day, John Gorton.
