= Lenox Hewitt =

Australian public servant (1917–2020)

Sir Lenox Hewitt OBE
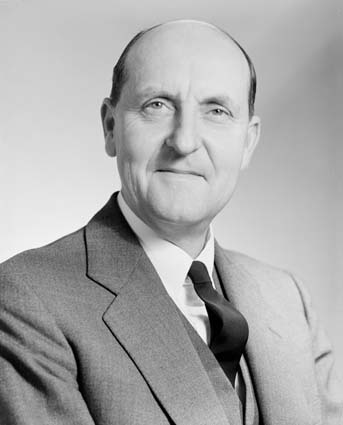

Secretary of the Prime Minister's Department
- In office 11 March 1968 – 12 March 1971

Secretary of the Department of the Environment, Aborigines and the Arts
- In office 31 May 1971 – 19 December 1972

Secretary of the Department of Environment and Conservation
- In office 20 December 1972 – 9 January 1973

Secretary of the Department of Aboriginal Affairs
- In office 20 December 1972 – 9 January 1973

Secretary of the Department of Minerals and Energy
- In office 20 December 1972 – 24 August 1975

Personal details
- Born: Cyrus Lenox Simson Hewitt; 7 May 1917 St Kilda, Victoria, Australia
- Died: 28 February 2020 (aged 102) Edgecliff, New South Wales, Australia
- Spouse: Hope Tillyard (m. 1942–2011)
- Relations: Robert John Tillyard (father-in-law)
- Children: Patricia, Antonia, Hilary and Andrew
- Occupation: Public servant

Sir Cyrus Lenox Simson Hewitt OBE (7 May 1917 – 28 February 2020) was an Australian public servant. His career in the Commonwealth Public Service spanned from 1939 to 1980, and included periods as a senior adviser and departmental secretary. His most prominent position was as secretary of the Prime Minister's Department during the Gorton government (1968–1971). He worked closely with Prime Minister John Gorton, although his initial appointment in place of John Bunting was seen as unconventional. Hewitt was also influential as secretary of the Department of Minerals and Energy during the Whitlam government (1972–1975), working under minister Rex Connor. He later served as chairman of Qantas (1975–1980).

== Early life ==
Hewitt was born in St Kilda, Victoria, on 7 May 1917. He was educated at Scotch College, Melbourne, and graduated from the University of Melbourne with a Bachelor of Economics, which he completed on a part-time basis while employed by BHP on a traineeship.

== Early career ==
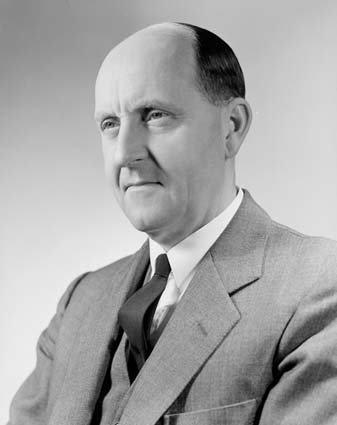
Hewitt in 1961 as a Treasury employee

From 1939 to 1946, he was Assistant Secretary to Sir Douglas Copland, who was Commonwealth prices commissioner and special economic adviser to the prime minister.

He joined the Department of Postwar Reconstruction 1946–49 as an economist. In 1950 he was posted to London as official secretary and acting deputy high commissioner to the United Kingdom, remaining there till 1953.

On return to Australia he joined the Department of the Treasury, where a position of assistant secretary was specially created for him. He was first assistant secretary 1955–62, and deputy secretary 1962–66. In 1967 he was appointed to chair the Australian Universities Commission.

== Gorton government ==
In January 1968, John Gorton became Prime Minister in unusual circumstances after the drowning of Harold Holt in December 1967. Gorton did not want to continue receiving advice from the long-serving departmental secretary Sir John Bunting, and he created a new Department of the Cabinet Office for him, appointing Hewitt as Secretary of the Prime Minister's Department in March.

This appointment was not well received in the senior public service echelons in Canberra. On the plus side, Hewitt had a reputation for having a formidable mind, a grasp of detail, a capacity to make quick decisions and an impatience with red tape. On the other hand, he had always stirred strong responses in those he dealt with, and was often considered brusque and impatient. But the major point in his disfavour was that he was never a part of the group of senior figures who lunched at the Commonwealth Club; they disliked him for setting himself apart from them. Hewitt's appointment was also in the same anti-traditionalist mould as that of the appointment of Ainsley Gotto as Gorton's senior personal adviser. She had a number of strikes against her: she was aged only 22, she had not had the extensive experience expected of a person in such a position, and she was a woman.

Hewitt was knighted in the 1971 New Year's Honours for his services as head of the Prime Minister's Department. Gorton left the prime ministership voluntarily in March 1971 after he barely survived a party room ballot instigated by his rival William McMahon; Gorton considered this close result to be insufficient demonstration of support for him and he called a new ballot, in which he was not a candidate.

== McMahon government ==
McMahon succeeded Gorton as prime minister; one of his first acts was to restore Sir John Bunting to his old job by merging the Department of the Cabinet Office with the Prime Minister's Department, under a new name, the Department of the Prime Minister and Cabinet. Hewitt was appointed secretary of the newly created Department of the Environment, Aborigines and the Arts. His minister was Peter Howson, who was not keen on the job (he was reported as describing it as "trees, boongs and poofters").

== Whitlam government ==
McMahon's Liberal government survived less than two years, being soundly defeated by Gough Whitlam's Labor Party in December 1972. The new Minister for Minerals and Energy, Rex Connor, had established a good relationship with Sir Lenox Hewitt in the period leading up to the election, and he chose him to be the first Secretary of the Department of Minerals and Energy. As Graham Freudenberg wrote in A Certain Grandeur (1977):

In Hewitt Connor felt he had found a kindred spirit – both were strong nationalists, both loners, both impatient of the windy orthodoxies of 'established channels'; both saw themselves as tough-minded negotiators, both authoritarian, both more easily able to inspire fear than affection, yet both had great charm in private; both were supremely confident in the ability of their applied intelligence to master any problem.

In 1974, Whitlam considered appointing Hewitt as Secretary to the Treasury, replacing Sir Frederick Wheeler, but in the end he opted to maintain the status quo. In 1974 and 1975 Hewitt was involved in dealings with Tirath Khemlani and he played a role in the Loans Affair. In July 1975 he was one of a number of senior public servants summoned to give evidence to the Senate over the Loans Affair; in the event, the government claimed crown immunity from such questioning.

In 1975 consideration was given to the creation of a new Department of Economic Planning, which would assume many of the functions of Treasury and reduce its influence. Hewitt was again in Whitlam's mind to head this department, with Wheeler to be appointed Governor of the Reserve Bank. The events of 1975 culminating in the Labor government's dismissal did not permit this plan to come to fruition.

== Later life ==
Later in 1975 Whitlam appointed Hewitt Chairman of Qantas for a five-year term. He ended his term in 1980 amid public controversy over not being given a further five-year term by the incumbent Liberal government of Malcolm Fraser. He was offered only a one-year extension, but chose not to accept it.

After Qantas, he chaired the Snowy Mountains Council and was a member of the Australian Atomic Energy Commission. In August 1985 he was appointed Chairman of the New South Wales State Rail Authority.

Hewitt turned 100 in May 2017. He celebrated his birthday with a party at the Union, University & Schools Club, which was attended by Paul Keating, Ian Sinclair, and Michael Kirby, among others. He was interviewed by The Weekend Australian in January 2018 for the 50th anniversary of John Gorton becoming prime minister, and described Gorton as "a great reforming prime minister" whose "resignation was a great loss to Australian politics".

Hewitt remained publicly active well into old age, having outlived many of his contemporaries. He made written submissions to parliamentary enquiries and was sometimes called as a witness to share his experience. He was interviewed by Jenny Hocking in connection with her biography Gough Whitlam: His Time (2012).

Hewitt died from the effects of Lewy body dementia on 28 February 2020, at an aged-care facility in Edgecliff, New South Wales.

== Honours ==
In 1963 Hewitt was appointed an Officer of the Order of the British Empire, in recognition of his service as Deputy Secretary of the Treasury. He was knighted in 1971 for his service as Secretary of the Prime Minister's Department. Hewitt also won the 1989 Tony Jannus Award for services to aviation, and was awarded the Centenary Medal in 2001.

== Personal life ==
In 1941 he met (Alison) Hope Tillyard (1915–2011), the daughter of entomologist Robert John Tillyard. They married in 1942. Hope Hewitt became a highly respected English lecturer at the Australian National University, and a poet and writer, among other achievements.

They had four children: Patricia, Antonia (died 1990), Hilary and Andrew. Patricia Hewitt long resided in the United Kingdom, where she became a Labour politician and government minister under Tony Blair.

Government offices
Preceded by John Bunting	Secretary of the Prime Minister's Department; 1968–1971	Succeeded by John Bunting as Secretary of the Department of the Prime Minister and Cabinet
Preceded by John Bunting as Secretary of the Department of the Vice-President of the Executive Council	Secretary of the Department of the Environment, Aborigines and the Arts; 1971–1972	Succeeded by Himself as Secretary of the Department of Aboriginal Affairs
Preceded by John Bunting as Secretary of the Department of the Vice-President of the Executive Council	Secretary of the Department of the Environment, Aborigines and the Arts; 1971–1972	Succeeded by Himself as Secretary of the Department of Environment and Conservation
Preceded by John Bunting as Secretary of the Department of the Vice-President of the Executive Council	Secretary of the Department of the Environment, Aborigines and the Arts; 1971–1972	Succeeded by Ebor Lane as Secretary of the Department of the Media (Acting)
Preceded by Himself as Secretary of the Department of the Environment, Aborigines and the Arts	Secretary of the Department of Environment and Conservation; 1972–1973	Succeeded by Don McMichael
Preceded by Himself as Secretary of the Department of the Environment, Aborigines and the Arts	Secretary of the Department of Aboriginal Affairs; 1972–73	Succeeded by Barrie Dexter
Preceded by Lloyd Bott (Acting)	Secretary of the Department of Minerals and Energy; 1972–75	Succeeded by Jim Scully
