= Don McMichael =

Dr Don McMichael CBE

Secretary of the Department of Environment and Conservation
- In office 1 Jan 1973 – 21 April 1975

Secretary of the Department of the Environment
- In office 21 April 1975 – 22 December 1975

Secretary of the Department of Home Affairs
- In office 27 February 1978 – 3 November 1980

Secretary of the Department of Home Affairs and Environment
- In office 3 November 1980 – 1 February 1984

Director of the National Museum of Australia
- In office 1 February 1984 – 31 May 1989

Personal details
- Born: Donald Fred McMichael; 28 January 1932 Rockhampton, Queensland
- Died: 10 June 2017 (aged 85)
- Education: University of Sydney; Harvard University
- Occupation: Public servant

Donald Fred McMichael CBE (28 January 1932 – 10 June 2017) was an Australian marine biologist and senior public servant.

== Life and career ==
McMichael was born in Rockhampton, Queensland on 28 January 1932. He was schooled at North Sydney Technical High School and Newcastle Technical High School, before graduating from University of Sydney in 1952 with first class honours in zoology. Don started his career as an Assistant Curator at the Australian Museum. He then received a Fulbright Travelling Scholarship to undertake an MA and PhD at Harvard University in 1953-55.

His PhD thesis at Harvard University, which he began in 1953, was on Australian freshwater mussels.

On his return to Australia, Don was appointed Curator of Molluscs, and then Deputy Director (from 1967), of the Australian Museum. His positions with the Australian Museum encapsulated themes that were to continue throughout his professional life - public service, environment and museums. In 1969 he was appointed as the second Director of the New South Wales National Parks and Wildlife Service, a role he held till 1973.

In December 1975, he was appointed Director of Environment within the new Department of Environment, Housing and Community Development.

In February 1978, McMichael was appointed Secretary of the Department of Home Affairs. When that Department was reconstituted as the Department of Home Affairs and Environment, he continued as Secretary. Issues of central importance during his time in the Department included the Tasmanian Dam case and the Uluṟu-Kata Tjuṯa National Park, and the need for a greening Australia program.

McMichael was appointed the first Director of the National Museum of Australia in February 1984, for a seven-year term. At the time, the Museum was expected to open in 1990. In May 1989, McMichael announced his retirement from the role and from the Australian Public Service, describing the last three years at the museum as "quite frustrating and negative" due to the Australian Government's lack of commitment to the museum.

== Awards ==
In June 1981, McMichael was made a Commander of the Order of the British Empire for public service. He was awarded a Centenary Medal in 2001 for service as the first Director of the Australian Conservation Foundation.

Government offices
| Preceded by Lenox Hewitt | Secretary of the Department of Environment and Conservation; 1973–1975 | Succeeded by Himself as Secretary of the Department of the Environment |
| Preceded by Himself as Secretary of the Department of Environment and Conservation | Secretary of the Department of the Environment; 1975 | Succeeded by Bob Lansdown as Secretary of the Department of Environment, Housing and Community Development |
| Preceded by A.R. Palmer (Acting) | Secretary of the Department of Home Affairs; 1978–1980 | Succeeded by Himself as Secretary of the Department of Home Affairs and Environment |
| Preceded by John Farrands as Secretary of the Department of Science and the Environment | Secretary of the Department of Home Affairs and Environment; 1980–1984 | Succeeded by Pat Galvin |
| Preceded by Himself as Secretary of the Department of Home Affairs | Secretary of the Department of Home Affairs and Environment; 1980–1984 | Succeeded by Pat Galvin |
| New title Inaugural appointment to position | Director of the National Museum of Australia; 1984–1989 | Succeeded by Margaret Coldrake |
