= John Bunting (public servant) =

Australian public servant and diplomat

Sir John Bunting AC KBE
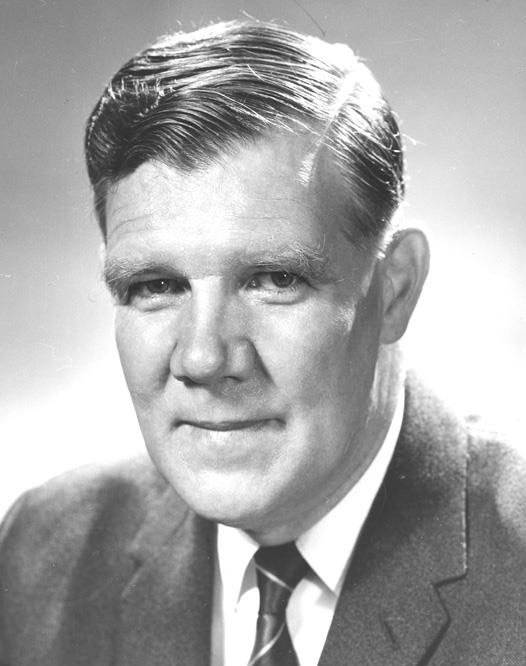
- Bunting circa 1964.

Australian High Commissioner to the United Kingdom
- In office 1 February 1975 – 31 March 1977
- Preceded by: John Armstrong
- Succeeded by: Sir Gordon Freeth

Secretary of the Prime Minister's Department
- In office 1959 – 10 March 1968
- Preceded by: Allen Brown
- Succeeded by: Lenox Hewitt

Secretary of the Department of Education and Science
- In office 13 December 1966 – 1 February 1967

Secretary of the Department of the Cabinet Office
- In office 11 March 1968 – 17 March 1971

Secretary of the Department of the Prime Minister and Cabinet
- In office 17 March 1971 – 31 January 1975
- Preceded by: new office
- Succeeded by: John Menadue

Personal details
- Born: Edward John Bunting; 13 August 1918 Ballarat, Victoria
- Died: 2 May 1995 (aged 77) Sydney
- Spouse: (Lady) Peggy Bunting
- Children: 3 sons
- Education: University of Melbourne; BA, (Hons)
- Occupation: Public servant; Diplomat

Sir Edward John Bunting AC KBE (13 August 1918 – 2 May 1995) was an Australian public servant and diplomat, whose senior career appointments included Australian High Commissioner to the United Kingdom and Secretary of the Department of the Prime Minister and Cabinet.

== Biography ==
Bunting was born in Ballarat, Victoria, and educated at the Trinity Grammar School. In 1937 he entered residence at Trinity College (University of Melbourne), where he played cricket and football, graduating in 1938 with a Bachelor of Arts (honours). Bunting was one of four graduates accepted into the Commonwealth Public Service in 1940, accepting a posting in Canberra within the Department of Trade and Customs and later, the Department of Post-war Reconstruction. After a short posting overseas, Bunting became a member of the Sydney-based Inter-Departmental Dollar Committee, which dealt with the allocation of dollars for imports.

In 1950 he was appointed to the Prime Minister's Department as an assistant secretary and later returned to London as Official Secretary at Australia House. Back in Canberra, Bunting was appointed deputy secretary in the Prime Minister's Department and appointed as Secretary to that department in 1959, a position he continued to hold until 1968, and served successive prime ministers Sir Robert Menzies, Harold Holt, and John McEwen. Within days of John Gorton becoming Prime Minister, Bunting was sidelined as Secretary to the newly formed Department of the Cabinet Office and was replaced by Lenox Hewitt as Secretary to the Prime Minister's Department. On taking office as Prime Minister in 1971, William McMahon reversed Gorton's changes and restored Bunting to the pre-eminent position as Secretary to the newly formed Department of the Prime Minister and Cabinet. Hewitt accepted appointment to the lesser role of Secretary to the Department of the vice-president of the Executive Council. Bunting provided advice to incoming Prime Minister Gough Whitlam on the transition to government; with Whitlam later opining of Bunting:

(His) loyalty, integrity, diligence and dedication have made him a leader and example among all public servants.

Bunting was appointed to serve as High Commissioner in London, with effect from 1 February 1975. Suffering a heart attack whilst in Dundee in February 1976, Bunting returned to Australia in 1977, unable to complete his full term as High Commissioner.

Upon his return to Australia, Bunting was appointed as a consultant to the Office of National Assessments. A close confidant of Robert Menzies during and after his Prime Ministerial career, in 1978 Bunting was appointed as the inaugural National Coordinator of the Sir Robert Menzies Memorial Foundation. In 1988, Bunting authored a biography of Robert Menzies, entitled R. G. Menzies: a portrait.

Bunting died in Sydney on 2 May 1995, aged 77, survived by Lady Bunting and their three sons.

== Honours ==
In 1953 Bunting was appointed an Officer of the Order of the British Empire; and upgraded to a Commander of the Order in 1961. Knighted as a Knight Bachelor in 1964; and appointed a Knight Commander of the Order of the British Empire in 1977. In 1982 Bunting was appointed a Companion of the Order of Australia in recognition for public and community service.

Diplomatic posts
Preceded by John Armstrong	Australian High Commissioner to the United Kingdom; 1975–1977	Succeeded by Sir Gordon Freeth
Government offices
Preceded by Allen Brown	Secretary of the Prime Minister's Department; 1959–1968	Succeeded by Lenox Hewitt
New title Department created	Secretary of the Department of the Cabinet Office; 1968–1971	Succeeded by Himself as Secretary of the Department of the Prime Minister and Cabinet
Preceded by Himself as Secretary of the Department of the Cabinet Office	Secretary of the Department of the Prime Minister and Cabinet; 1971–1975	Succeeded by John Menadue
Preceded by Lenox Hewitt as Secretary of the Prime Minister's Department	Secretary of the Department of the Prime Minister and Cabinet; 1971–1975	Succeeded by John Menadue
New title Department created	Secretary of the Department of Education and Science; 1966–1967	Succeeded by Hugh Ennor
