= Don Anderson (public servant) =

Australian public servant

Sir Don Anderson CBE

Director-General of the Department of Civil Aviation
- In office 1 January 1956 – 30 September 1973

Personal details
- Born: Donald George Anderson; 1 March 1917 Waikerie, South Australia
- Died: 30 November 1975 (aged 58) Heidelberg, Melbourne, Victoria
- Spouse: Monica Mary Porker (m. 1941–1975)
- Education: University of Adelaide
- Occupation: Public servant

Sir Donald George Anderson CBE (1 March 1917 – 30 November 1975) was a senior Australian public servant. He was Director-General of the Department of Civil Aviation from January 1956 until September 1973.

== Life and career ==
Anderson was born to parents Clara Catherine Anderson (née Nash) and Alex Gibb Anderson in Waikerie, South Australia on 1 March 1917. He was schooled at Adelaide High School and the University of Adelaide.

On 1 January 1956, Anderson began his term as Director-General of the Department of Civil Aviation. He served in the role until September 1973, in retirement serving as Chairman of Qantas.

Anderson died on 30 November 1975 in Heidelberg, Melbourne.

== Awards ==
In June 1950 Anderson was appointed a Commander of the Order of the British Empire (CBE) for his service as Director-General in the Department of Civil Aviation. He was made a Knight Bachelor in June 1967.

Government offices
Preceded by Richard Williams	Director-General of the Department of Civil Aviation; 1956 – 1973	Succeeded by Charles Halton
