= Department of Defence Support =

Australian government department, 1982–1984

Department overview
- Formed: 7 May 1982
- Preceding Department: Department of Industry and Commerce – for manufacture of goods and provision of services for defence purposes Department of Administrative Services (II) – for defence purchasing
- Dissolved: 13 December 1984
- Superseding Department: Department of Industry, Technology and Commerce – for offsets
- Jurisdiction: Commonwealth of Australia
- Headquarters: Reid, Canberra
- Ministers responsible: Ian Viner, Minister (1982–1983); Brian Howe, Minister (1983–1984)
- Department executive: Charles Halton, Secretary

The Department of Defence Support was an Australian government department that existed between May 1982 and December 1984.

== History ==
The department was established by the Fraser government after a recommendation from the Defence Review Committee, which concluded that there were disadvantages in the previous large structure of the Defence Department. Charles Halton became Secretary of the new department. In July 1984 a 27-person senior executive team was appointed to assist the departmental Secretary, of which only one was a woman.

The department was abolished in December 1984, after Bob Hawke was elected Prime Minister in the 1983 Australian federal election. Hawke reasoned that the needs of defence policy making in Australia would be better served if all responsibilities were bought together within the one portfolio.

== Scope ==
Information about the department's functions and government funding allocation could be found in the Administrative Arrangements Orders, the annual Portfolio Budget Statements and in the Department's annual reports.

Functions of the Department at its creation were:

- Within defence policies approved by the Minister for Defence the following support for defence purposes -
  - Purchase of goods and services
  - Manufacture of goods and provision of services
  - Research and development
  - Development of Australian industry
  - Dockyard support.

== Structure ==
The Department was an Australian Public Service department, staffed by officials who were responsible to the Minister for Defence Support.
