= Charles Halton (public servant) =

Australian public servant

Charles Halton CBE

Director-General of the Department of Civil Aviation
- In office 30 September 1973 – 30 November 1973

Secretary of the Department of Transport
- In office 5 November 1973 – 7 May 1982

Secretary of the Department of Defence Support
- In office 7 May 1982 – 13 December 1984

Secretary of the Department of Communications
- In office 1 February 1986 – 24 July 1987

Personal details
- Born: Charles Christopher Halton; 4 March 1932 Yorkshire, Northern England
- Died: 16 October 2013 (aged 81)
- Spouse: Shirley
- Children: Jane, David and Philip
- Occupation: Public servant

Charles Christopher Halton CBE (4 March 1932 – 16 October 2013) was a senior Australian public servant.

== Life and career ==
Charles Halton was born on 4 March 1932 in Yorkshire, Northern England.

As an engineer in England in the 1950s and 60s, Halton was associated with the development of the Concorde and the guidance system of the Bristol Bloodhound.

Gough Whitlam appointed Halton Secretary of the Department of Transport in 1973, and Halton and his family moved to Canberra from Canada where they had lived since 1969. The Halton family stayed in Canberra, with Charles Halton appointed to further senior positions in the Australian Public Service, as Secretary of the Department of Defence Support (1982–84), as Chairman leading a taskforce on Youth Allowance Administration (1984–85) and as Secretary of the Department of Communications (1986–87).

== Awards ==
Charles Halton was honoured as a Commander of the Order of the British Empire in 1983.

== References and further reading ==
- CA 29: Department of Civil Aviation, Central Office, National Archives of Australia, archived from the original on 15 March 2020
- CA 1492: Department of Transport [III], Head Office/ (from 1975) Central Office, Canberra and Melbourne, National Archives of Australia
- CA 3067: Department of Communications [I], Central Office, Canberra, National Archives of Australia
- CA 3254: Department of Defence Support, National Archives of Australia

Government offices
Preceded by Bob Lansdown	Secretary of the Department of Communications; 1986 – 1987	Succeeded by Peter Wilenski as Secretary of the Department of Transport and Communications
New title Department established	Secretary of the Department of Defence Support; 1982 – 1984	Department abolished
Preceded by Malcolm Macgregor Summers	Secretary of the Department of Transport; 1973 – 1982	Succeeded by Rae Taylor as Secretary of the Department of Transport and Construction
Preceded by Malcolm Macgregor Summers	Secretary of the Department of Transport; 1973 – 1982	Succeeded by Collin Freeland as Secretary of the Department of Aviation
Preceded by Don Anderson	Director-General of the Department of Civil Aviation; 1973	Succeeded by Himself as Secretary of the Department of Transport
