= Department of the Environment (Australia, 1975) =

Australian government department, 1975–1975

Department overview
- Formed: 21 April 1975
- Preceding Department: Department of Environment and Conservation
- Dissolved: 22 December 1975
- Superseding Department: Department of Environment, Housing and Community Development Department of National Resources
- Jurisdiction: Commonwealth of Australia
- Ministers responsible: Moss Cass, Minister (Apr – Jun 1975); Jim Cairns, Minister (Jun – Jul 1975); Gough Whitlam, Minister (Jul 1975); Joe Berinson, Minister (Jul – Nov 1975); Andrew Peacock, Minister (Nov – Dec 1975)
- Department executive: Don McMichael, Secretary

The Department of the Environment was an Australian government department that existed between April and December 1975.

== History ==
The Department was introduced by the Whitlam government in April 1975, to replace the Department of Environment and Conservation. At the time, Prime Minister Gough Whitlam said that the reason for the re‑badging was that the name "Department of Environment and Conservation" suggested that conservation was a separate matter from the environment, whereas it was in fact a major component of the Government's total environment program. Environment Minister Moss Cass made the request for the name change, stating that the previous title was too long and redundant.

== Scope ==
Information about the department's functions and government funding allocation could be found in the Administrative Arrangements Orders, the annual Portfolio Budget Statements and in the Department's annual reports.

At its creation, the Department's functions were:

- Environment and conservation, including water and the protection and use of water resources
- National parks
- Wildlife conservation

== Structure ==
The Department was a Commonwealth Public Service department, staffed by officials who were responsible to the Minister for the Environment.
