= Department of the Environment, Aborigines and the Arts =

Australian government department, 1971–1972

Department overview
- Formed: 31 May 1971
- Dissolved: 19 December 1972
- Superseding Department: Department of Aboriginal Affairs – for Aboriginal affairs Department of Environment and Conservation Department of the Media – for film industry, government printing, publishing, advertising Department of Science (I) Department of Services and Property Department of the Special Minister of State (I)
- Jurisdiction: Commonwealth of Australia
- Headquarters: Canberra
- Ministers responsible: Peter Howson, Minister (1971–1972); Gough Whitlam, Minister (1972)
- Department executive: Lenox Hewitt, Secretary

The Department of the Environment, Aborigines and the Arts was an Australian government department that existed between May 1971 and December 1972.

The department, created by the McMahon government, was a collection of three areas that had previously been handled by other departments or government agencies. These included the Department of the Interior, the Department of the vice-president of the Executive Council, and the Office of Aboriginal Affairs in the Prime Minister's Department. The department was abolished by the incoming Whitlam government, with its functions split across six departments (the Departments of Aboriginal Affairs, Environment and Conservation, Media, Prime Minister and Cabinet, Special Minister of State, Science and Services and Property).

The DEAA was not formally created as a new department, but rather the former Department of the vice-president of the Executive Council was renamed.

== Scope ==
Information about the department's functions and government funding allocation could be found in the Administrative Arrangements Orders, the annual Portfolio Budget Statements and in the department's annual reports.

At its creation, the department dealt with:

- activities related to the environment
- Aboriginal affairs
- support for the arts and letters
- the National Library
- Australian films
- national archives
- general services of printing, publishing and advertising (including the Gazette)
- world expositions
- grants to national organizations
- overseas visits
- war memorial and war graves
- overseas property

== Structure ==
The department was an Australian Public Service department, staffed by officials who were responsible to the Minister for the Environment, Aborigines and the Arts. The department's first Minister, Peter Howson, was not keen on the job, reportedly calling the portfolio "trees, boongs and poofters".

The secretary of the department was Lenox Hewitt.
