= Department of Environment, Housing and Community Development =

Australian government department, 1975–1978

Department overview
- Formed: 22 December 1975
- Preceding Department: Department of Tourism and Recreation – for recreation Department of Urban and Regional Development – for urban and regional planning and development Department of Housing and Construction (I) – for housing Department of Repatriation and Compensation – for the Housing Loans Insurance Corporation Department of the Environment (I) – for conservation and protection of the environment
- Dissolved: 5 December 1978
- Superseding Department: Department of Science and the Environment – for environment and conservation Department of Housing and Construction (II) – for housing and building industry Department of Home Affairs (III) – for administration of the National Estate, Australian Heritage Commission and community development, responsibility for sport, leisure and recreational activities Department of Employment and Youth Affairs – for youth affairs Department of National Development (II) – for decentralisation, the States Grant (soil conservation) Act 1974, urban planning, development and local government
- Jurisdiction: Commonwealth of Australia
- Headquarters: Canberra
- Department executive: Bob Lansdown, Secretary

The Department of Environment, Housing and Community Development was an Australian government department that existed between December 1975 and December 1978.

== History ==
The Department was announced in December 1975, after the Departments of Tourism and Recreation, Urban and Regional Development, Housing and Construction and the Environment were abolished. The Department was intended to work closely with the States with regards to matters of local concern with a maxim of maximum consultation.

== Scope ==
Information about the department's functions and government funding allocation could be found in the Administrative Arrangements Orders, the annual Portfolio Budget Statements and in the Department's annual reports.

At its creation, the Department was responsible for the following:

- Urban and regional planning and development
- Environment and Conservation
- Building industry
- Housing
- Provision of hostel accommodation in the Australian Territories and for immigrants
- Leisure, including sport, physical fitness and community recreation
- Youth affairs.

== Structure ==
The Department was an Australian Public Service department, staffed by officials who were responsible to the Minister for Environment, Housing and Community Development.
