= Moss Cass =

Australian politician (1927–2022)

The Honourable Moss Cass
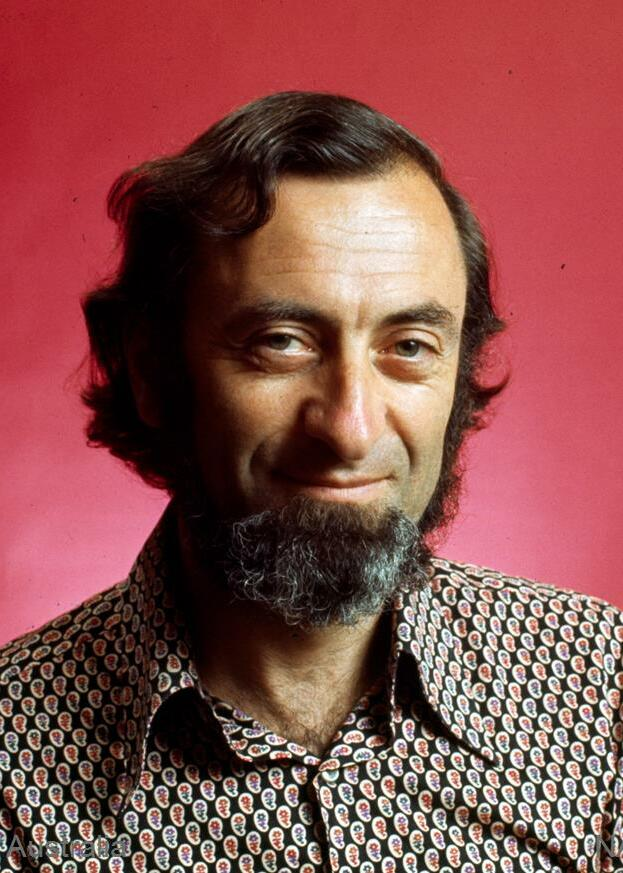
- Cass in 1973

Minister for the Media
- In office 6 June 1975 – 11 November 1975
- Prime Minister: Gough Whitlam
- Preceded by: Doug McClelland
- Succeeded by: Reg Withers

Minister for Environment and Conservation
- In office 19 December 1972 – 6 June 1975; As Minister for the Environment: 21 April 1975 – 6 June 1975
- Prime Minister: Gough Whitlam
- Preceded by: Peter Howson
- Succeeded by: Jim Cairns

Member of the Australian Parliament for Maribyrnong
- In office 25 October 1969 – 4 February 1983
- Preceded by: Philip Stokes
- Succeeded by: Alan Griffiths

Personal details
- Born: 18 February 1927 Narrogin, Western Australia, Australia
- Died: 26 February 2022 (aged 95) Melbourne, Victoria, Australia
- Party: Labor
- Education: University of Sydney
- Occupation: Medical practitioner

Moses Henry Cass (18 February 1927 – 26 February 2022) was an Australian doctor and politician who held ministerial office in the Whitlam government. He served as Minister for Environment and Conservation (1972–1975), the Environment (1975), and the Media (1975). He represented the Division of Maribyrnong in the House of Representatives from 1969 to 1983.

== Early life ==
Cass was born in Narrogin, Western Australia to Jewish parents who had fled Tsarist Russia to escape antisemitism. His paternal grandfather, Moses Cass, was born in Białystok, Vistula Land, Tsarist Russia (now Poland), arriving in Perth in 1906.

Cass studied medicine at the University of Sydney and during the 1950s and 1960s worked as a registrar at hospitals in Sydney, London and Melbourne. He was a research fellow at Melbourne's Royal Children's Hospital and conducted research into the use of a heart–lung machine for open-heart surgery. He was the first medical director (from 1964 to 1969) of the Trade Union Clinic and Research Centre, which became the Western Region Health Centre (now merged into the cohealth community health organisation).

He became known as a proponent of abortion law reform and was the spokesman for the Abortion Reform Association. On a radio broadcast in June 1969, Cass stated "I have certainly broken the law on numerous occasions by sending patients to other doctors for the purpose of having abortions induced." He stated that he had performed abortions "every weekend" at Royal North Shore Hospital while undergoing his residency and that he was "sure that most doctors are in the same position".

== Politics ==
Cass joined the Australian Labor Party (ALP) in 1955. He ran for the Kew City Council in 1961 but lost after the distribution of preferences. He stood in safe Liberal seats at the 1961 and 1963 elections, running against Prime Minister Robert Menzies in Kooyong and John Jess in La Trobe.

At the 1969 federal election, Cass defeated incumbent Liberal MP Philip Stokes in the Division of Maribyrnong. He was appointed Minister for Environment and Conservation following the election of the Whitlam government in 1972. He appointed marine biologist Don McMichael as his departmental secretary. Cass held the second-lowest rank in cabinet, above only science minister Bill Morrison. He was assisted in his environmental protection efforts by Rex Connor, the Minister for Minerals and Energy. Connor used his seniority in the party to overcome opposition to Cass's proposals, notably helping secure the passage of the Environment Protection (Impact of Proposals) Act 1974.

In an address to a Young Labor meeting in Melbourne, Cass was reported as having stated he would like to see the legalisation of marijuana in Australia as he thought it was "pretty harmless" and made people "feel good."

Cass was unsuccessful in seeking to prevent the flooding of Lake Pedder in Tasmania. Nonetheless, he did lay the groundwork for the end of sandmining on Fraser Island and government protection of the Great Barrier Reef. In 1975 he led parliamentarians and ALP branch members in expressing concerns about the effects of uranium mining. A key concern was the adverse effect that uranium mining would have on the northern Aboriginal people. Cass said: "nuclear energy creates the most dangerous, insidious and persistent waste products, ever experienced on the planet".

In October 1973, Cass seconded former prime minister John Gorton's motion for the decriminalisation of homosexuality, which was successful although it had no legal effect. He also argued for the decriminalisation of marijuana.

In April 1975, Cass's title was changed to just "Minister for the Environment", at his own request. He said the previous title was too long and redundant. In June 1975, Cass relinquished the environment portfolio and instead was appointed Minister for the Media. He announced plans for a voluntary Australian Press Council, but in September stated that a voluntary council would not be sufficient. He was criticised by Rupert Murdoch, who stated it was "sinister" and constituted censorship. Cass stated that the proposal had been subjected to "bizarre distortion and hysterical over-reaction" by some sections of the press.

Following the dismissal of the government and Labor's defeat at the 1975 election, Cass was named opposition spokesman for health in Whitlam's shadow cabinet. When Bill Hayden replaced Whitlam as opposition leader in December 1977, Cass was given the portfolio of immigration and ethnic affairs. He supported cutting immigration, stating there were not enough jobs for migrants. In 1978, he stated that there was "considerable organisation" behind Vietnamese boat people coming to Australia.

Cass announced in June 1982 that he would not recontest his seat at the next election.

== Later life and death ==
In 1983, Cass chaired a review into the Australian Institute of Multicultural Affairs. In the same year he was appointed by the Hawke government to the council of the National Museum of Australia.

Cass served as chair of the Australian National Biocentre from 2002 to 2003. He was also patron of the Sustainable Living Foundation and an honorary fellow at the Melbourne University School of Land and Environment.

In 2007, Cass was a founding member of Independent Australian Jewish Voices, a "breakaway group from Australia's main pro-Israel Jewish lobby organisations". During the Gaza War of 2009, he signed a statement condemning Israel's "grossly disproportionate military assault".

His daughter Naomi is an arts administrator and gallery director and his second child Deborah Cass was an academic lawyer at the London School of Economics whose writings and teaching were widely admired in Australia and overseas. The Deborah Cass writing prize, a national writing prize for first and second generation migrant writers, was created after her death was offered annually 2015–2022.

Cass died on 26 February 2022, at the age of 95.

== Quotes ==
Cass is incorrectly believed by some to be the originator of the saying, "We do not inherit the earth from our ancestors; we borrow it from our children" (although a similar paraphrase was used earlier by the environmental activist Wendell Berry). On 13 November 1974, when Cass was environment minister, he gave a speech in Paris to the meeting of the Organisation for Economic Co-operation and Development. Borrowing heavily from Native American proverbs and traditions, he said:

We rich nations, for that is what we are, have an obligation not only to the poor nations, but to all the grandchildren of the world, rich and poor. We have not inherited this earth from our parents to do with it what we will. We have borrowed it from our children and we must be careful to use it in their interests as well as our own. Anyone who fails to recognise the basic validity of the proposition put in different ways by increasing numbers of writers, from Malthus to The Club of Rome, is either ignorant, a fool, or evil.

Cass's version was a longer explanation than the original, traditional proverb.

Cass has been cited as the first person to use the term "queue jumping" in reference to asylum seekers, in a 1978 opinion column in The Australian.

Political offices
Preceded by Gough Whitlam	Minister for Environment and Conservation; 1972–1975	Succeeded by Himself
Preceded by Himself	Minister for the Environment; 1975	Succeeded by Jim Cairns
Preceded by Doug McClelland	Minister for the Media; 1975	Succeeded by Reg Withers
Parliament of Australia
Preceded by Philip Stokes	Member for Maribyrnong; 1969–1983	Succeeded by Alan Griffiths
