= Bob Lansdown =

Australian public servant

Bob Lansdown AO CBE

Secretary of the Department of Urban and Regional Development
- In office 19 December 1972 – 22 December 1975

Secretary of the Department of Environment, Housing and Community Development
- In office 1 January 1976 – 30 November 1978

Secretary of the Postal and Telecommunications Department
- In office 10 July 1979 – 3 November 1980

Secretary of the Department of Communications
- In office 6 November 1980 – 1 February 1986

Personal details
- Born: Robert Broughton Lansdown; 9 May 1921 East Maitland
- Died: 6 May 2006 (aged 84)
- Education: University of Sydney
- Occupation: Public servant

Robert Broughton Lansdown AO CBE (9 May 1921 – 6 May 2006) was a senior Australian public servant and policymaker.

== Life and career ==
Bob Lansdown was born on 9 May 1921 in East Maitland. At the age of 14, he first joined the Australian Public Service, as a post office bicycle messenger in Strathfield.

During World War II, Lansdown joined the Second Australian Imperial Force, serving in the Middle East and New Guinea.

Lansdown first rejoined the Australian Public Service in 1950 as a Private Secretary in the Prime Minister's Department.

In December 1972 Lansdown was appointed Secretary of the Department of Urban and Regional Development and he remained head of the department when it was transitioned to Department of Environment, Housing and Community Development.

Between July 1979 and November 1980, Lansdown served as Secretary of the Postal and Telecommunications Department. He was the inaugural head of the Department of Communications when the Postal and Communications Department was abolished.

In 1986, Lansdown retired from the public service.

== Awards and honours ==
Lansdown was made a Commander of the Order of the British Empire for housing, environment and community development in 1977. In 1991 he was made an Officer of the Order of Australia for service to communications.

In 2009, a street in the Canberra suburb of Casey was named Lansdown Crescent in Bob Lansdown's honour.

Government offices
New title Department established	Secretary of the Department of Urban and Regional Development; 1972 – 1975	Succeeded by Himself as Secretary of the Department of Environment, Housing and Community Development
Preceded by Himself as Secretary of the Department of Urban and Regional Development	Secretary of the Department of Environment, Housing and Community Development; 1975 – 1978	Succeeded by John Farrands as Secretary of the Department of Science and the Environment
Preceded by Don McMichael as Secretary of the Department of the Environment	Secretary of the Department of Environment, Housing and Community Development; 1975 – 1978	Succeeded by George Warwick Smith as Secretary of the Department of Housing and Construction
Preceded by Alan Reiher as Secretary of the Department of Housing and Construction	Secretary of the Department of Environment, Housing and Community Development; 1975 – 1978	Succeeded by Brian Tregillis as Secretary of the Department of Employment and Youth Affairs
Preceded by Fred Green	Secretary of the Postal and Telecommunications Department; 1979 – 1980	Succeeded by Himself as Secretary of the Department of Communications
Preceded by Himself as Secretary of the Postal and Telecommunications Department	Secretary of the Department of Communications; 1980 – 1986	Succeeded by Charles Halton
