= Department of Home Affairs (1977–1980) =

Australian government department, 1977–1980

Department overview
- Formed: 20 December 1977
- Preceding Department: Department of Administrative Services (II) Department of the Prime Minister and Cabinet
- Dissolved: 3 November 1980
- Superseding Department: Department of Primary Industry (II) Department of Home Affairs and Environment
- Jurisdiction: Commonwealth of Australia
- Headquarters: Canberra
- Minister responsible: Bob Ellicott, Minister
- Department executives: A.R. Palmer, Acting Secretary (1977–1978); Don McMichael, Secretary (1978–1980)

The Department of Home Affairs was an Australian government department that existed between December 1977 and November 1980. It was the third so-named Australian government department.

== Scope ==
Information about the department's functions and government funding allocation could be found in the Administrative Arrangements Orders, the annual Portfolio Budget Statements and in the department's annual reports.

At its creation, the department dealt with:

- Administration of Norfolk Island, the Territory of Cocos (Keeling) Islands, the Territory of Christmas Island and the Coral Sea Islands Territory
- Women's affairs
- Support for the arts and letters
- National archives
- National museums

== Structure ==
The department was an Australian Public Service department, staffed by officials who were responsible to the Minister for Home Affairs, Bob Ellicott.
