= Doug McClelland =

Australian politician (born 1926)

The Honourable Doug McClelland AC
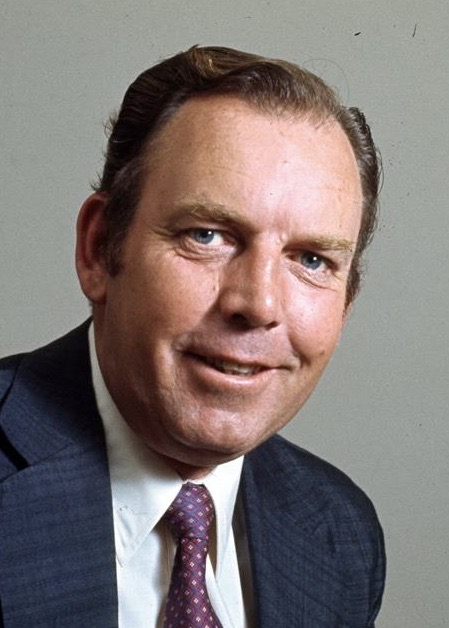
- McClelland in 1973

President of the Senate
- In office 21 April 1983 – 23 January 1987
- Preceded by: Harold Young
- Succeeded by: Kerry Sibraa

Special Minister of State
- In office 6 June 1975 – 11 November 1975
- Prime Minister: Gough Whitlam
- Preceded by: Lionel Bowen
- Succeeded by: Reg Withers

Minister for the Media
- In office 19 December 1972 – 6 June 1975
- Prime Minister: Gough Whitlam
- Preceded by: New office
- Succeeded by: Moss Cass

High Commissioner to the United Kingdom
- In office 21 March 1987 – March 1991
- Preceded by: Alfred Parsons
- Succeeded by: Richard Smith

Senator for New South Wales
- In office 1 July 1962 – 23 January 1987
- Succeeded by: Sue West

Personal details
- Born: 5 August 1926 (age 100) Wentworthville, New South Wales, Australia
- Party: Labor
- Spouse: Lorna McNeill
- Relations: Alfred McClelland (father); Robert McClelland (son)
- Occupation: Court reporter, politician

Douglas McClelland AC (born 5 August 1926) is an Australian former politician who served as a Senator for New South Wales from 1962 to 1987, representing the Australian Labor Party (ALP). He was Minister for the Media (1972–1975) and Special Minister of State (1975) in the Whitlam government, and ended his political career as President of the Senate (1983–1987). He resigned from the Senate to become High Commissioner to the United Kingdom (1987–1991). McClelland is the earliest elected federal parliamentarian still living and the last living former Labor parliamentarian who served under Arthur Calwell, and along with Paul Keating is the last surviving minister who served under Gough Whitlam.

== Early life ==
Born on 5 August 1926 in the western Sydney suburb of Wentworthville, Doug McClelland was the son of Gertrude Amy (née Cooksley) and Alfred McClelland. His father was a farmer, union organiser, and ALP politician who served two terms in the Parliament of New South Wales (1920–1927 and 1930–1932). He attended Wentworthville Public School before going on to Parramatta High School and the Metropolitan Business College in Parramatta. After leaving school he found work as a clerk in the state Agriculture Department.

In 1944, five days after his 18th birthday, McClelland enlisted in the Australian Imperial Force (AIF). He was stationed for periods in New South Wales, Queensland, and the Northern Territory before being discharged in January 1947 with the rank of corporal. From 1949 he worked as a court reporter, employed by the state and federal governments. During this time he was an active member of the Australian Journalists Association.

== Early political involvement ==
McClelland formally joined the Labor Party in 1947, having been involved with the party throughout his childhood. His father was a close friend of H. V. Evatt, who became federal leader of the party in 1951. McClelland served as secretary of the electoral council for Evatt's seat of Barton from 1953 to 1958 and acted as Evatt's campaign secretary. He unsuccessfully sought preselection for Barton when Evatt moved seats prior to the 1958 federal election, losing to Len Reynolds by two votes. He was a member of the New South Wales state executive of the ALP from 1956 to 1962.

== Parliamentary career ==
=== Backbencher, 1962–1972 ===
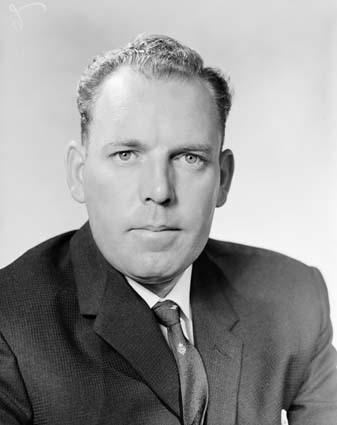
McClelland in 1962

At the 1961 federal election, McClelland was elected to a six-year Senate term commencing on 1 July 1962. He defeated Democratic Labor Party candidate Jack Kane for the final vacancy in New South Wales, with Kane unsuccessfully challenging the result in the Court of Disputed Returns. McClelland was re-elected to the Senate at the 1967, 1974, 1975, 1980 and 1983 elections, with his terms being cut short by double dissolutions on three occasions.

McClelland was active on a number of Senate committees and supported expansion of the committee system. He served on the Select Committee on the Encouragement of Australian Productions for Television from 1962 to 1963, chaired by Liberal senator Seddon Vincent, and endorsed the committee's report which drew attention to the lack of local content in Australian television. Although not a member of the ALP caucus executive (equivalent to the modern shadow cabinet), he became one of the party's leading critics on the government's media policy, seeking greater government regulation of the industry through the Australian Broadcasting Control Board.

Outside of the media, McClelland "vehemently criticised Australian participation in the Vietnam War, especially the conscription of young men and the treatment of conscientious objectors, and he asserted his approval of and participation in the Vietnam moratorium movement".

=== Government minister, 1972–1975 ===
Following Labor's victory at the 1972 federal election, McClelland was appointed minister for media in the Whitlam government on 19 December 1972. The newly created Department of the Media was responsible for the Australian Broadcasting Commission (ABC), the Australian Broadcasting Control Board, the Australian Film Development Corporation, the Australian Government Publishing Service and the Australian News and Information Bureau.

On 6 June 1975, McClelland was appointed special minister of state and replaced as media minister by Moss Cass, also becoming manager of government business in the Senate.

=== Opposition, 1975–1983 ===
McClelland continued as manager of opposition business in the Senate after Labor's defeat at the 1975 election and served as the opposition spokesman on administrative services. He was elected as his party's deputy Senate leader in May 1977, but was defeated by John Button in another ballot after the 1977 election and chose not to seek re-election to the shadow cabinet under new leader Bill Hayden.

McClelland was elected chairman of committees on 20 August 1981. He won the position with the support of the Australian Democrats, defeating the Fraser government's nominee Douglas Scott by a single vote. This established a convention that the post of chairman of committees should be held by a member of the opposition.

=== Senate president, 1983–1987 ===
In August 1981, McClelland was elected Chairman of Committees in the Senate, adding the title Deputy President in October. He defeated National Country Party senator Douglas Scott by one vote with the aid of the Democrats, marking the start of the convention that the position is held by the opposition. When the ALP won the 1983 federal election, McClelland was elected President of the Senate in place of Harold Young. In 1985 and 1986, he was represented by lawyers at the trials of Lionel Murphy, a judge of the High Court and former ALP senator, where concerns had arisen over whether parliamentarian witnesses could be examined on their conduct in parliament. McClelland subsequently introduced what became the Parliamentary Privileges Act 1987, which defined and codified certain aspects of parliamentary privilege. It was "the first bill introduced by a presiding officer in the history of the Australian Parliament".

McClelland retired from the Senate in January 1987, the year before the opening of the new Parliament House. He had served as chairman of the Joint Standing Committee on the New Parliament House from 1983.

== Later life ==
McClelland arrived in London on 20 March 1987 to take up appointment as Australian high commissioner to the United Kingdom. Much of his first two years was taken up with arrangements relating to the Australian Bicentenary. He attended local commemorations in various British locations relating to the First Fleet and attended the First Fleet Re-enactment Voyage. He secured approval for an Australian Army detachment to be allowed to stand guard at Buckingham Palace and also helped persuade the British government to send a vellum copy of the original Commonwealth of Australia Constitution Act 1900 act to Australia.

McClelland opposed moves to dispose of the high commissioner's official residence in Hyde Park Gate as a cost-saving measure, personally lobbying Hawke and treasurer Paul Keating against a sale. He later secured funding from Keating for the residence to be renovated. His term as high commissioner ended in 1991 and he was replaced by career diplomat Richard Smith.

McClelland was interviewed by The Australian in November 2025, aged 99, in the lead-up to the 50th anniversary of the Whitlam government's dismissal. Along with Keating, who entered the ministry less than a month before the dismissal, McClelland is the last surviving member of the Whitlam ministry, and the only member to become a centenarian.

== Personal life ==
In 1950, McClelland married Lorna McNeill, with whom he had three children. Their only son Robert McClelland became the third generation of the family to enter parliament, serving as federal attorney-general from 2007 to 2011.

McClelland was awarded the Douglas Wilkie Medal for services to non-football in 1973 by the Anti-Football League. The accolade was presented after McClelland introduced a points system for television programming.

Political offices
Preceded by New title	Minister for the Media; 1972–1975	Succeeded by Moss Cass
Preceded by Lionel Bowen	Special Minister of State; 1975	Succeeded by Reg Withers
Parliament of Australia
Preceded by Justin O'Byrne	Father of the Australian Senate; 1981–1987	Succeeded by Peter Durack; Arthur Gietzelt
Preceded by Sir Harold Young	President of the Australian Senate; 1983–1987	Succeeded by Kerry Sibraa
Diplomatic posts
Preceded by Alfred Parsons	Australian High Commissioner to the United Kingdom; 1987–1991	Succeeded by Richard Smith
Honorary titles
Preceded by Bill Grayden	Earliest serving living Parliamentarian; 2026 – present	Incumbent
Preceded by George Hannan	Earliest serving living Senator; 2009 – present	Incumbent
