= Department of Premier and Cabinet =

A Department of Premier and Cabinet or Department of the Premier and Cabinet is a type of public service department common in each Australian state government. These organisations exist to support the work of the premier and cabinet (analogous to the executive council) through the provision of independent advice, and the management and oversight of government policies and initiatives.

Specific examples include:

- Premier's Department (New South Wales)
- The Cabinet Office (New South Wales)
- Department of Premier and Cabinet (Victoria)
- Department of Premier and Cabinet (Tasmania)
- Department of the Premier and Cabinet (Queensland)
- Department of the Premier and Cabinet (South Australia)
- Department of the Premier and Cabinet (Western Australia)

== See also ==
- Department of the Prime Minister and Cabinet (Australia)
