= Department of Housing and Construction (1973–1975) =

Former Australian government department (1973–1975)

Department overview
- Formed: 30 November 1973
- Preceding Department: Department of Housing Department of Works (III)
- Dissolved: 22 December 1975
- Superseding Department: Department of National Resources Department of Environment, Housing and Community Development Department of Construction
- Jurisdiction: Commonwealth of Australia
- Ministers responsible: Les Johnson, Minister (1973–1975); Joe Riordan, Minister (1975); John Carrick, Minister (1975)
- Department executive: Alan Reiher, Secretary

The Department of Housing and Construction was an Australian government department that existed between November 1973 and December 1975.

== History ==
The department was established while the Whitlam government was in power. Shortly after the Fraser government took office in November 1975 as a result of the Australian constitutional crisis, the department was abolished.

== Scope ==
Information about the department's functions and government funding allocation could be found in the Administrative Arrangements Orders, the annual Portfolio Budget Statements and in the department's annual reports.

The functions of the Department at its creation were:

- Housing
- Provision of hostel accommodation in the Australian territories and for immigrants
- Planning, execution and maintenance of Australian government works
- Design, provision and maintenance of furniture, furnishings and fittings for the Australian government
- Promotion of national standards in relation to building construction

Among other activities, the department prepared a feasibility study for the construction of Black Mountain Tower, a telecommunications tower in Canberra. The department also undertook planning for the tower's construction.

== Structure ==
The department was a Commonwealth Public Service department, staffed by officials who were responsible to the Minister for Housing and Construction.
