= Arthur Drakeford =

Australian politician (1878–1957)

The Honourable Arthur Drakeford
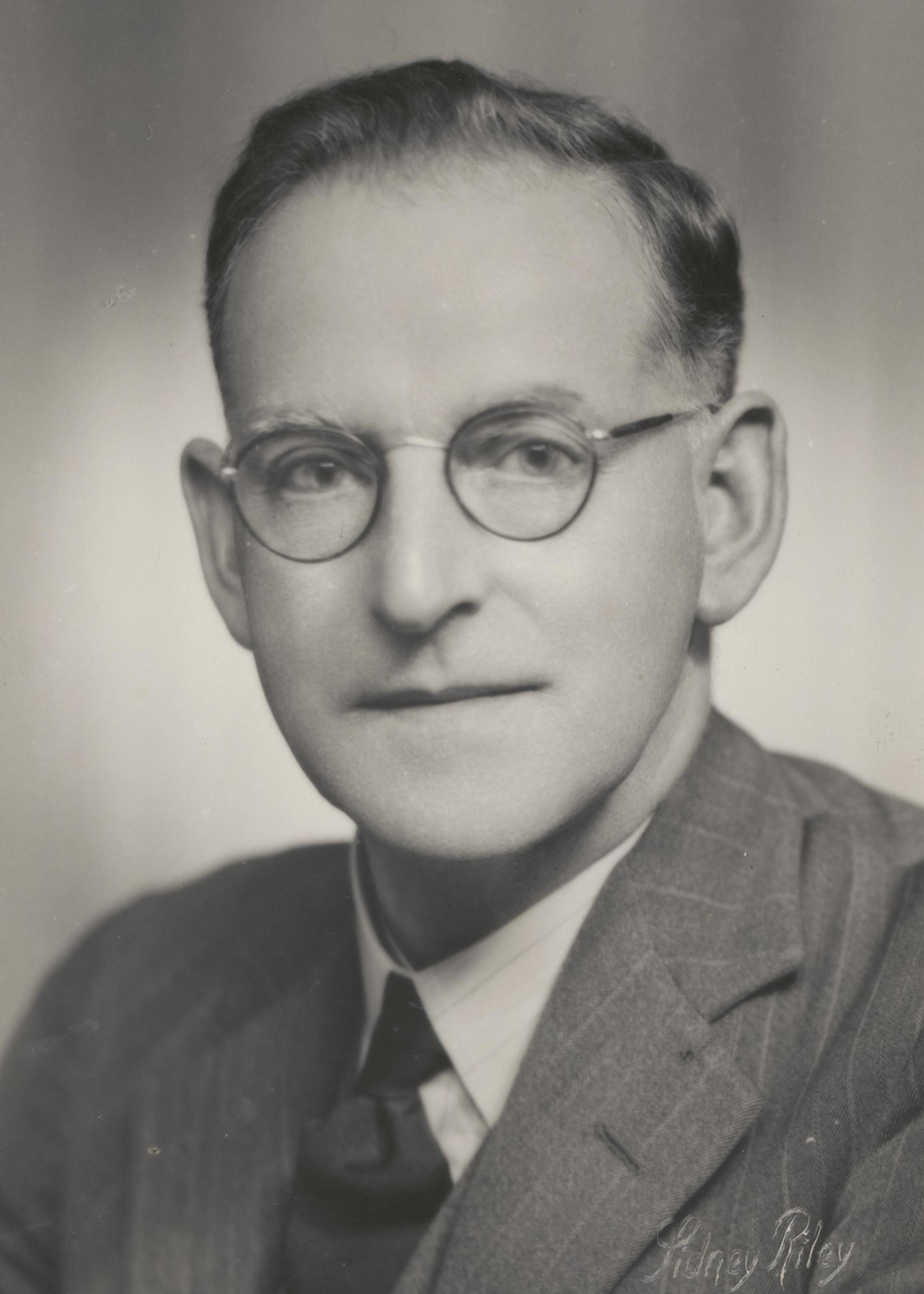

Minister for Air
- In office 7 October 1941 – 19 December 1949
- Preceded by: John McEwen
- Succeeded by: Thomas White

Member of the Australian Parliament for Maribyrnong
- In office 15 September 1934 – 10 December 1955
- Preceded by: James Fenton
- Succeeded by: Philip Stokes

Personal details
- Born: 26 April 1878 Fitzroy, Victoria, Australia
- Died: 9 June 1957 (aged 79) Moonee Ponds, Victoria, Australia
- Party: Labor
- Spouse: Ellen Unger
- Occupation: Unionist

Arthur Samuel Drakeford (26 April 1878 – 9 June 1957) was an Australian politician who served as a member of the House of Representatives from 1934 to 1955, representing the Labor Party. He served as Minister for Air and Minister for Civil Aviation from 1941 to 1949, and during World War II was the minister responsible for the Royal Australian Air Force. He was also responsible for the establishment of the domestic carrier Trans Australia Airlines and for the nationalisation of Qantas.

== Early life ==
Drakeford was born in the Melbourne suburb of Fitzroy, a son of jeweller Samuel Finch Drakeford (died 1933) and his wife Elizabeth Margaret Drakeford, née Josephs. His first job was cleaning railway engines at Benalla. In May 1902 he married Ellen Tyrie, but she died in 1906. In 1903 he became secretary of the Benalla branch of the Locomotive Engine Drivers' and Firemen's Association (LEDFA) and joined the Australian Labor Party. In 1908, he moved to Melbourne as an engine driver. In 1911 he married Ellen Unger. He was vice-president of the LEDFA from 1914 to 1915, its president from 1916 to 1917 and general secretary from 1918. In 1920 he became the first federal secretary of the new Australian Federated Union of Locomotive Enginemen and from 1929 to 1948 was its national president. In 1927 he became senior vice-president of the Australasian Council of Trade Unions on its foundation in 1927. He became president of the Labor Party's Victorian central executive in 1929.

== Political career ==
Drakeford was elected as the member for the Victorian Legislative Assembly seat of Essendon in 1927, but was defeated in 1932, partly as a result of his opposition to the fiscally conservative Premiers' Plan drawn up in response to the Great Depression. In the 1934 federal election, he was elected as the member for Maribyrnong and held it until the 1955 election. Following the coming to power of the Curtin government in October 1941, during World War II, he became Minister for the Air and Minister for Civil Aviation and held both positions until Labor's defeat at the 1949 election. He concentrated on obtaining resources for the Royal Australian Air Force and attempting to sort out its leadership problems, rather than intervening in military strategy. He was a member of War Cabinet from 1941 to 1946, and Minister for the Navy from August to November 1946, on the resignation of Norman Makin to become Ambassador to the United States.

After the war, Drakeford concentrated on the establishment of a state-owned airline. He set up the Australian National Airlines Commission, which established Trans Australia Airlines in 1946. Although Labor had intended it to be a monopoly, that was invalidated by the High Court under section 51(i) of the Australian Constitution, which guarantees free trade between the states. In 1947, he was in charge of the purchase of Qantas Empire Airways Ltd from Imperial Airways and its establishment as Australia's flag carrier. In 1947, he became president of the first assembly of the permanent body of the International Civil Aviation Organization in Montreal, Quebec, Canada.

Drakeford lost his seat at the 1955 election, as a result of the 1954 Labor Party split which led to the creation of the Democratic Labor Party (DLP). While he had a large lead on the first count, on the second count, DLP preferences flowed overwhelmingly to Liberal challenger Philip Stokes, allowing Stokes to win by only 114 votes.

Drakeford died in 1957 at his home in the Melbourne suburb of Moonee Ponds, survived by his wife and their four daughters. The son of his first marriage, Arthur Drakeford Jr. represented the Legislative Assembly seat of Essendon from 1945 to 1947 and Pascoe Vale from 1955 to 1958. The writer and composer Louis Drakeford has been named as a brother.

Political offices
Preceded by John McEwen	Minister for Air and Minister for Civil Aviation; 1941–1949	Succeeded by Thomas White
Preceded by Norman Makin	Minister for the Navy; 1946	Succeeded by Bill Riordan
Parliament of Australia
Preceded by James Fenton	Member for Maribyrnong; 1934–1955	Succeeded by Philip Stokes
