= Postal and Telecommunications Department =

Australian government department, 1975–1980

Department overview
- Formed: 22 December 1975
- Preceding Department: Postmaster-General's Department Department of the Media – for electronic media
- Dissolved: 3 November 1980
- Superseding Department: Department of Transport and Communications
- Jurisdiction: Commonwealth of Australia
- Department executives: Fred Green, Secretary (1975–1979); Bob Lansdown, Secretary (1979–1980)

The Postal and Telecommunications Department was an Australian government department, established in 1975 to take over the residual functions of the Postmaster-General's Department after its postal and telecommunications functions were split into the Australian Postal Commission (trading as Australia Post) and the Australian Telecommunications Commission (trading as Telecom, and which later became Telstra) respectively. The department was abolished in November 1980.

== History ==
The department was created in December 1975 by the Fraser government, replacing the Postmaster-General's Department which had been in operation since Australia's federation in 1901. The change was intended to take account of the increase in the functions of the department to include all electronic media matters which had previously been the responsibility of the Department of the Media.

== Scope ==
Information about the department's functions and government funding allocation could be found in the Administrative Arrangements Orders, the annual Portfolio Budget Statements and in the department's annual reports.

At its creation, the department was responsible for postal, telegraphic, telephonic and other like services.

== Structure ==
The department was an Australian Public Service department, staffed by officials who were responsible to the Minister of the day.
