= Philip Stokes =

Australian politician

Philip Stokes OBE
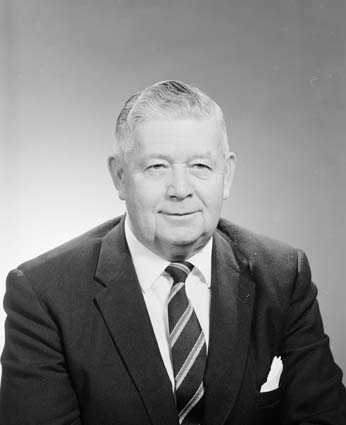

Member of the Australian Parliament for Maribyrnong
- In office 10 December 1955 – 25 October 1969
- Preceded by: Arthur Drakeford
- Succeeded by: Moss Cass

Personal details
- Born: 25 October 1906 Melbourne, Victoria
- Died: 18 October 1983 (aged 76)
- Party: Liberals
- Occupation: Real estate agent

Philip William Clifford Stokes, OBE (25 October 1906 – 18 October 1983) was an Australian politician. Born in Melbourne, he attended state schools and then Austral College. He was a bank officer before serving in the military 1940–45. On his return, he was an auctioneer and real estate agent. In 1955, he was elected to the Australian House of Representatives as the Liberal member for Maribyrnong. He held the seat until his defeat in 1969. Stokes died in 1983.

Parliament of Australia
Preceded by Arthur Drakeford	Member for Maribyrnong; 1955–1969	Succeeded by Moss Cass
