= James Fenton (politician) =

Australian politician (1864–1950)

The Honourable James Fenton CMG
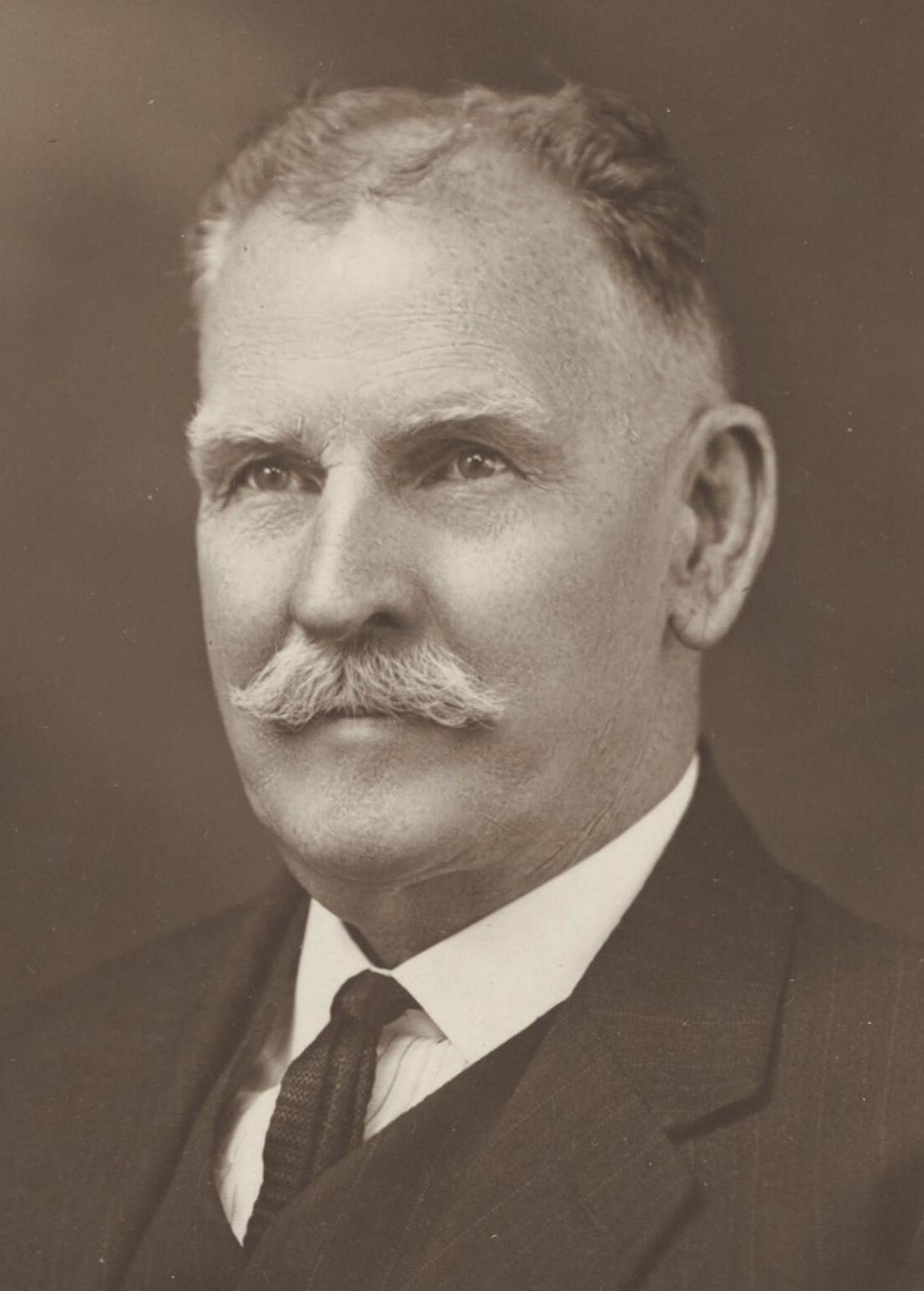

Postmaster-General of Australia
- In office 6 January 1932 – 13 October 1932
- Prime Minister: Joseph Lyons
- Preceded by: Albert Green
- Succeeded by: Archdale Parkhill

Minister for Trade and Customs
- In office 22 October 1929 – 4 February 1931
- Prime Minister: James Scullin
- Preceded by: Henry Gullett
- Succeeded by: Frank Forde

Member of the Australian Parliament for Maribyrnong
- In office 13 April 1910 – 15 September 1934
- Preceded by: Samuel Mauger
- Succeeded by: Arthur Drakeford

Personal details
- Born: 4 February 1864 Avoca, Victoria, Australia
- Died: 2 December 1950 (aged 86) Frankston, Victoria, Australia
- Party: Labor (to 1931); UAP (from 1931)
- Spouse: Elizabeth Jane Harvey (m. 1887)
- Occupation: Managing director

James Edward Fenton CMG (4 February 1864 – 2 December 1950) was an Australian politician. He is notable for having been appointed a cabinet minister by two governments of different political complexions, but resigning from both governments on matters of principle. His first resignation looms largely in history as that came with his political defection, whereas there was no defection with his second resignation.

He was also acting as prime minister of Australia for five months in the early 1930s.

== Early life ==
Born at Natte Yallock, near Avoca, Victoria, Fenton was educated at a local school. At 13, he became a printer's apprentice with the Avoca Mail and later became a compositor in the Government Printing Office in Melbourne, but lost his job in 1893 as a result of the depression of the 1890s. In 1887, he had married Elizabeth Jane Harvey. He was editor of the Broadford Courier from 1894 to 1903, and managing director of the Co-operative Dairyman from 1904 to 1910.

== Political career ==
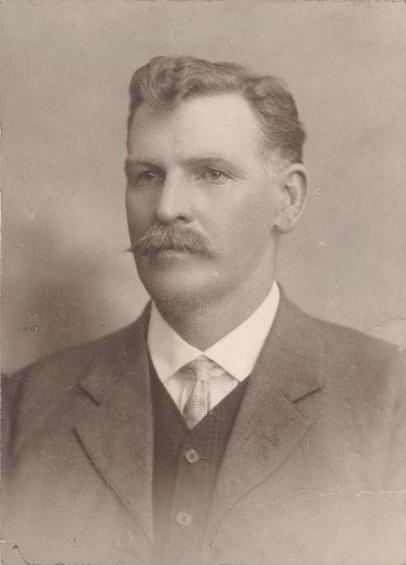
Undated photo

Fenton stood unsuccessfully for election to the Victorian Legislative Assembly three times as a liberal from 1897. In 1908 he stood, again unsuccessfully, as a Labor candidate; but in 1910, he was first elected as a member of the House of Representatives for the Division of Maribyrnong in Victoria. He held the seat without interruption until 1934.

When James Scullin led the Labor Party to victory at the 1929 general election, Fenton became Minister for Trade and Customs. He greatly increased the level of tariffs in an attempt to stimulate Australian industrial production.

However, the government soon was divided over the appropriate means to combat the Great Depression. Fenton became a supporter of the cautious, deflationary economic policies championed inside the Cabinet by his fellow minister Joseph Lyons, while other ministers supported more radical inflationary policies. While Scullin was in Britain from August 1930 to January 1931, attending the Imperial Conference and seeking to raise a low-interest loan for Australia, Fenton served as Acting Prime Minister, and Lyons as Acting Treasurer. Lyons, with Fenton's support, pursued conservative economic policies and sought to cut government spending, causing great anger among many in the Labor Caucus.

When Scullin returned to Australia in January 1931, he reappointed Ted Theodore, the major proponent of inflationary economic policies, as Treasurer. In response, Lyons and Fenton both immediately resigned from Cabinet. The following March, along with three other Labor MPs, they resigned from the Labor Party and crossed the floor to sit with the conservative Nationalist Party opposition. Soon the two groups merged to form the United Australia Party (UAP), with Lyons as its leader. At the general election in December 1931, the UAP won government in a landslide, and Fenton narrowly won his seat of Maribyrnong as a UAP candidate.

Fenton was appointed as Postmaster-General in the new UAP government and introduced the legislation that established the Australian Broadcasting Commission. But he soon fell out with his fellow ministers over the government's acceptance of the Ottawa Agreement, establishing Imperial Preference, which he considered threatened the high tariff policy. In October 1932 he resigned, after voting against the bill that ratified the agreement. He remained on the government backbench and ran again as the UAP candidate for Maribyrnong at the general election in 1934, but the seat was naturally a Labor one. He had been able to win it for the UAP in the anti-Labor landslide of 1931, but in 1934 Fenton lost to the Labor candidate, Arthur Drakeford, suffering a seven-point swing.

== Later life ==
After his defeat Fenton served as a director of the Commonwealth Oil Refineries from 1934 to 1936. He was appointed a Companion of the Order of St Michael and St George in 1938. He died in the Melbourne suburb of Frankston, survived by a son and a daughter, but pre-deceased by his wife and another daughter.

== Notes ==
Political offices
Preceded by Henry Gullett	Minister for Trade and Customs; 1929–1931	Succeeded by Frank Forde
Preceded by Albert Green	Postmaster-General; 1932	Succeeded by Archdale Parkhill
Parliament of Australia
Preceded by Samuel Mauger	Member for Maribyrnong; 1910–1934	Succeeded by Arthur Drakeford
