= Division of Maribyrnong =

Australian federal electoral division

Coordinates: 37.753°S 144.859°E

Maribyrnong Australian House of Representatives Division
- Interactive map of electorate boundaries from the 2025 federal election
- Created: 1906
- MP: Jo Briskey
- Party: Labor
- Namesake: Maribyrnong River
- Electors: 123,287 (2025)
- Area: 70 km^{2} (27.0 sq mi)
- Demographic: Inner metropolitan
Electorates around Maribyrnong:
| Hawke | Calwell | Calwell |
| Gorton | Maribyrnong | Wills |
| Fraser | Fraser | Melbourne |

The Division of Maribyrnong (/mærəbərnɒŋ/) is an Australian electoral division in the state of Victoria. It is located in the inner north-western suburbs of Melbourne. Suburbs include Aberfeldie, Airport West, Avondale Heights, Essendon, Footscray, Gowanbrae, Keilor East, Maribyrnong, Moonee Ponds, Niddrie, West Footscray and Tullamarine. Due to redistributions, the division has been slowly moving west and changed with the introduction of the Division of Fraser in 2018. According to the 2011 census, Maribyrnong has the highest proportion of Catholics in any Commonwealth Electoral Division in Australia with 41.6% of the population.

== Geography ==
Since 1984, federal electoral division boundaries in Australia have been determined at redistributions by a redistribution committee appointed by the Australian Electoral Commission. Redistributions occur for the boundaries of divisions in a particular state, and they occur every seven years, or sooner if a state's representation entitlement changes or when divisions of a state are malapportioned.

== History ==
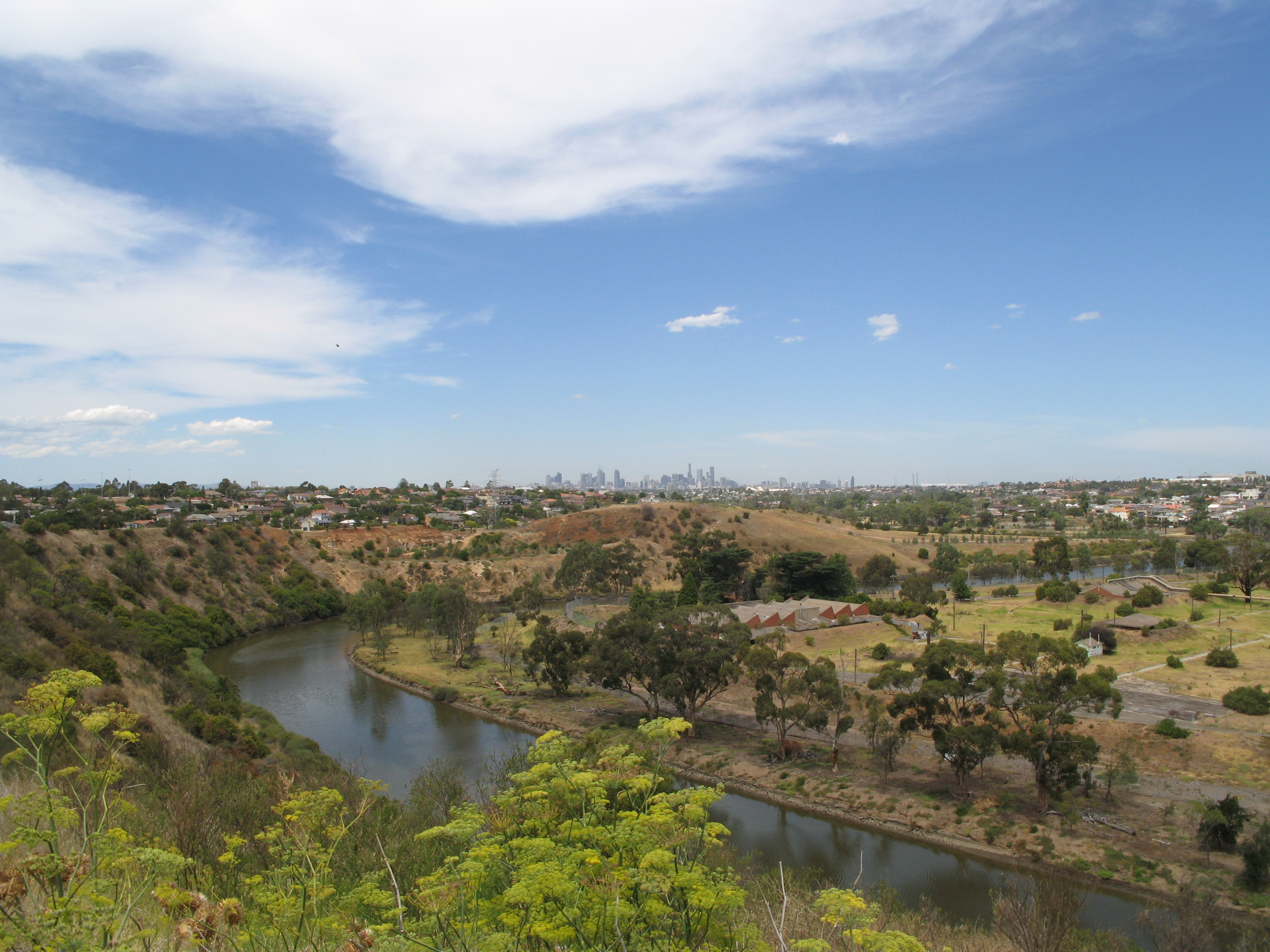
Maribyrnong River, the division's namesake

The division was proclaimed at the redistribution of 13 July 1906, and was first contested at the 1906 election. The division was named after the Maribyrnong River, which runs through it. A safe Labor seat for most of the first half of the 20th century, it became a marginal Liberal seat for most of the 1950s and 1960s, in part due to the influence of the Democratic Labor Party. Labor retook the seat in 1969, and for most of the time since then, it has been a comfortably safe Labor seat.

Prominent former members include James Fenton, a minister under James Scullin and Joseph Lyons; Arthur Drakeford, a minister under John Curtin, Frank Forde and Ben Chifley; and Moss Cass, a minister under Gough Whitlam. The most recent member for Maribyrnong, serving from 2007 until 2025, is the former National Secretary of the Australian Workers' Union and former Opposition Leader Bill Shorten.

== Members ==
| Image | Member | Party | Term | Notes |
|---|---|---|---|---|
| | Samuel Mauger (1857–1936) | Protectionist | 12 December 1906 – 26 May 1909 | Previously held the Division of Melbourne Ports. Served as minister under Deakin. Lost seat |
| | Samuel Mauger (1857–1936) | Liberal | 26 May 1909 – 13 April 1910 | Previously held the Division of Melbourne Ports. Served as minister under Deakin. Lost seat |
| | James Fenton (1864–1950) | Labor | 13 April 1910 – March 1931 | Served as minister under Scullin and Lyons. Lost seat |
| | James Fenton (1864–1950) | Independent | March 1931 – 7 May 1931 | Served as minister under Scullin and Lyons. Lost seat |
| | James Fenton (1864–1950) | United Australia | 7 May 1931 – 15 September 1934 | Served as minister under Scullin and Lyons. Lost seat |
| | Arthur Drakeford (1878–1957) | Labor | 15 September 1934 – 10 December 1955 | Served as minister under Curtin, Forde and Chifley. Lost seat |
| | Philip Stokes (1906–1983) | Liberal | 10 December 1955 – 25 October 1969 | Lost seat |
| | Moss Cass (1927–2022) | Labor | 25 October 1969 – 4 February 1983 | Served as minister under Whitlam. Retired |
| | Alan Griffiths (1952–) | Labor | 5 March 1983 – 29 January 1996 | Served as minister under Hawke and Keating. Retired |
| | Bob Sercombe (1949–2025) | Labor | 2 March 1996 – 17 October 2007 | Previously held the Victorian Legislative Assembly seat of Niddrie. Retired |
| | Bill Shorten (1967–) | Labor | 24 November 2007 – 20 January 2025 | Served as minister under Rudd, Gillard and Albanese. Served as Opposition Leader from 2013 to 2019. Resigned to become Vice-Chancellor of the University of Canberra |
| | Jo Briskey (1985–) | Labor | 3 May 2025 – present | Incumbent |

== Election results ==
2025 Australian federal election: Maribyrnong
| Party | Candidate | Votes | % | ±% |
|---|---|---|---|---|
| Labor | Jo Briskey | 46,064 | 41.43 | −0.76 |
| Liberal | Tim Beddoe | 33,874 | 30.46 | +3.71 |
| Greens | James Williams | 23,594 | 21.22 | +4.51 |
| One Nation | Alannah Casey | 7,665 | 6.89 | +4.45 |
| Total formal votes | | 111,197 | 97.29 | +2.30 |
| Informal votes | | 3,098 | 2.71 | −2.30 |
| Turnout | | 114,295 | 92.74 | +3.97 |
Two-party-preferred result
| Labor | Jo Briskey | 69,660 | 62.65 | −0.38 |
| Liberal | Tim Beddoe | 41,537 | 37.35 | +0.38 |
| Labor hold | | Swing | −0.38 | |
