= Department of the Prime Minister and Cabinet (Australia) =

Federal central public service department of the Australian Government

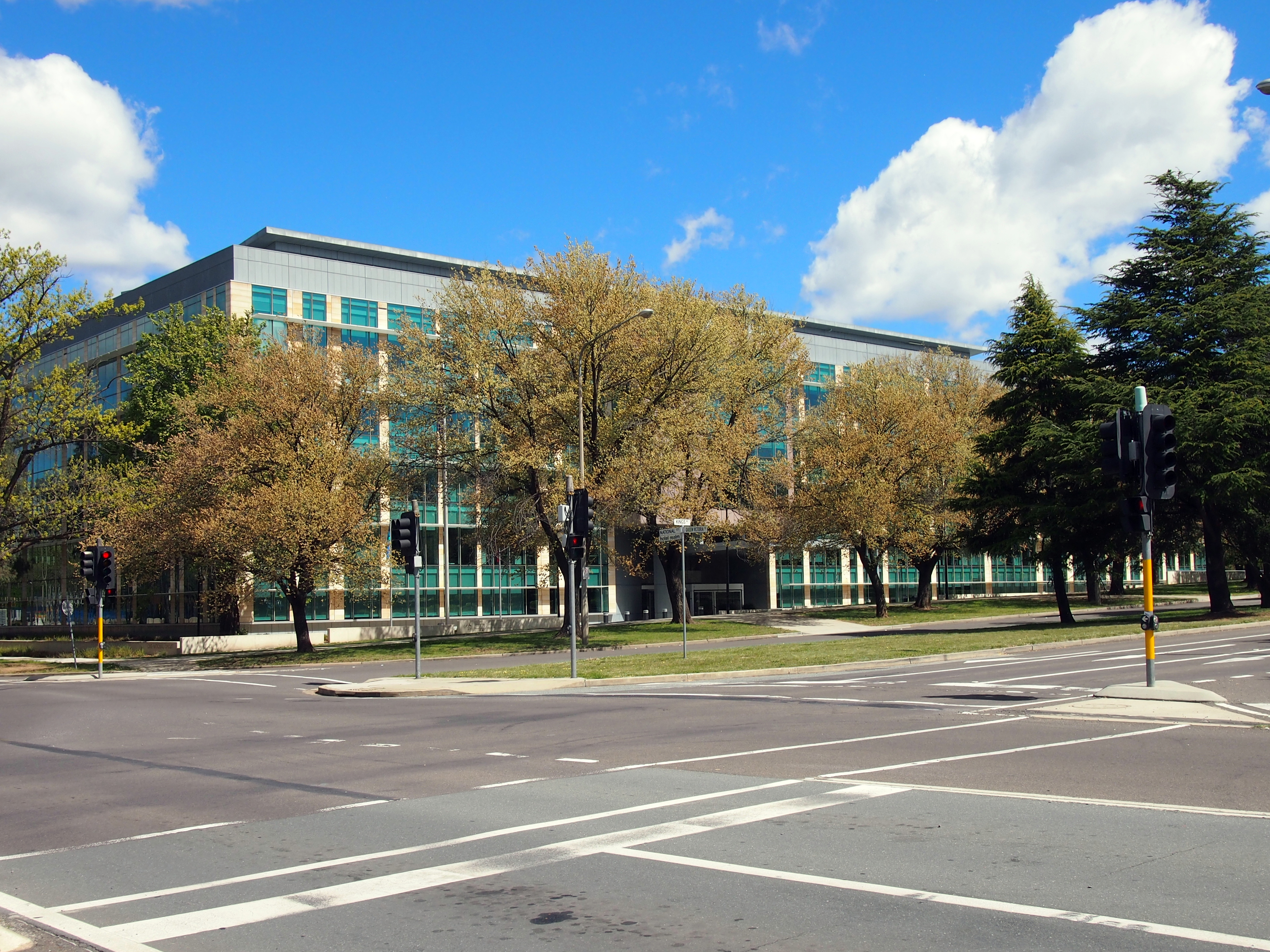
- Office headquarters in Barton, Australian Capital Territory photographed in 2012

Agency overview
- Formed: 12 March 1971
- Preceding agency: Prime Minister's Department Department of the Cabinet Office
- Jurisdiction: Commonwealth of Australia
- Employees: 1,373 (2023–2024)
- Annual budget: $442.4 million (2023–2024)
- Ministers responsible: Anthony Albanese, Prime Minister; Katy Gallagher, Minister for the Public Service; Malarndirri McCarthy, Minister for Indigenous Australians; Andrew Charlton, Cabinet Secretary; Patrick Gorman, Assistant Minister to the Prime Minister and Assistant Minister for the Public Service
- Agency executive: Steven Kennedy, Secretary
- Child agencies: Office of the Official Secretary to the Governor-General; Australian Public Service Commission; Office of National Intelligence; Workplace Gender Equality Agency; National Indigenous Australians Agency; Australian Institute of Aboriginal and Torres Strait Islander Studies; Australian National Audit Office; Office of the Registrar of Indigenous Corporations; Indigenous Land Corporation; Central Land Council; Northern Land Council; National Australia Day Council
- Website: pmc.gov.au

The Department of the Prime Minister and Cabinet (PM&C) is a department of the Australian Government with broad-ranging responsibilities, including but not limited to intergovernmental and whole-of-government policy coordination, and supporting the work of the prime minister and federal cabinet. PM&C was formed in 1971 and traces its origins to the original Prime Minister's Department, established in 1911.

The role of PM&C is to support the policy agenda of the prime minister and cabinet through the provision of high-quality advice, and the coordination and implementation of key government initiatives. This includes management and delivery of Aboriginal and Torres Strait Islander policies and programs with a view to promoting reconciliation, leadership of the Australian Public Service (APS) and its oversight body, the Australian Public Service Commission, administration of honours and symbols of the Commonwealth, support for whole-of-government services, and other functions as may be assigned by the incumbent government.

The department is similar but not analogous to the United States Executive Office of the President, the Cabinet Office of the United Kingdom, the Canadian Privy Council Office, and New Zealand's Department of the Prime Minister and Cabinet. All Australian states, with the exception of New South Wales, have their own departments of Premier and Cabinet. New South Wales has separate departments for the Premier and Cabinet following a reorganisation by Premier Chris Minns, effective July 2023.

== History ==
Before 1911, the Prime Minister had no department of their own as such. The Prime Minister was concurrently the Minister for External Affairs, and used the services of the Department of External Affairs.

The Prime Minister's Department was created in July 1911, initially on a small scale compared to other government departments of the day.

On 11 March 1968, Prime Minister John Gorton split off a section of the Prime Minister's Department to form the Department of the Cabinet Office with responsibility to service the Cabinet and the committees of Cabinet.

On 12 March 1971, the Prime Minister's Department was abolished and its functions moved to the new Department of the Prime Minister and Cabinet that combined the functions of the Prime Minister's Department and the Department of the Cabinet Office. The Prime Minister of the day, William McMahon, told the media that the former system with separate departments was inefficient.

== Portfolio ministers ==
The Department of the Prime Minister and Cabinet portfolio includes the following ministers:

- Prime Minister
- Minister for Indigenous Australians
- Minister for Women
- Minister for the Public Service
- Assistant Minister to the Prime Minister and Assistant Minister for the Public Service
- Cabinet Secretary

== Secretary of the Department ==
The secretary of the Department of the Prime Minister and Cabinet is the head of the department, also known as the secretary of the level of Senior Executive Service Band 4 in the Australian Public Service as per the Public Service Act 1999.

The secretary of the department is the equivalent of the Cabinet Secretary in the United Kingdom or the Clerk of the Privy Council in Canada.

The position of Secretary of the Department of the Prime Minister and Cabinet should not be confused with the position of Cabinet Secretary which has been both a ministerial position within the Cabinet and a political staffer within the Prime Minister's Office.

The secretary is supported by a senior executive of the department, composed of the Senior Executive Service Band 3 officials of deputy secretaries across the portfolio groups of the department.

Name	Postnominal(s)	Term began	Term ended	Time in Appointment
Secretary, Prime Minister's Department
Malcolm Shepherd	CMG, ISO	1 January 1912	27 January 1921	9 years, 26 days
Percy Deane	CMG	11 February 1921	31 December 1928	7 years, 324 days
Sir John McLaren	CMG	1 January 1929	2 March 1933	4 years, 60 days
John Starling	CMG, OBE	2 March 1933	11 November 1935	2 years, 254 days
Frank Strahan	CBE, CVO	11 November 1935	24 August 1949	13 years, 286 days
Sir Allen Brown	CBE	25 August 1949	31 December 1958	9 years, 128 days
Sir John Bunting	CBE	1 January 1959	10 March 1968	9 years, 69 days
Sir Lenox Hewitt	OBE	11 March 1968	12 March 1971	3 years, 1 day
Secretary, Department of the Prime Minister and Cabinet
Sir John Bunting	KBE	17 March 1971	31 January 1975	3 years, 320 days
John Menadue	AO	1 February 1975	30 September 1976	1 year, 242 days
Sir Alan Carmody	CBE	1 October 1976	12 April 1978	1 year, 193 days
Sir Geoffrey Yeend	AC, CBE	18 April 1978	10 February 1986	7 years, 298 days
Mike Codd	AC	10 February 1986	27 December 1991	5 years, 320 days
Michael Keating	AC	27 December 1991	13 May 1996	4 years, 138 days
Max Moore-Wilton	AC	13 May 1996	20 December 2002	6 years, 221 days
Peter Shergold	AC	10 February 2003	28 February 2008	5 years, 18 days
Terry Moran	AO	3 March 2008	4 September 2011	3 years, 185 days
Ian Watt	AO	5 September 2011	30 November 2014	3 years, 86 days
Michael Thawley	AO	1 December 2014	23 January 2016	1 year, 53 days
Martin Parkinson	AC, PSM	23 January 2016	2 September 2019	3 years, 222 days
Philip Gaetjens		2 September 2019	22 May 2022	2 years, 262 days
Stephanie Foster (Acting)	PSM	22 May 2022	6 June 2022	15 days
Glyn Davis	AC	6 June 2022	16 June 2025	3 years, 10 days
Steven Kennedy	PSM	16 June 2025	incumbent	1 year, 111 days

== Functions ==
In an Administrative Arrangements Order made on 13 May 2025, the functions of the department were broadly classified into the following matters:

- Advice to the Prime Minister across Government on policy and implementation
- Assistance to the Prime Minister in managing the Cabinet programme
- Whole of government national security and intelligence policy co-ordination
- Intergovernmental relations and communications with State and Territory Governments
- Co-ordination of Government administration
- Australian Government employment workplace relations policy, including equal employment opportunity and administration of the framework for agreement making and remuneration and conditions
- Australian honours and symbols policy
- Government ceremonial and hospitality
- Commonwealth Aboriginal and Torres Strait Islander policy, programmes and service delivery
- Promotion of reconciliation
- Public sector reform
- Community development employment projects
- Women's policies and programmes
- Official Establishments, ownership and property management of the Prime Minister's official residences

== Organisational structure ==
The structure of PM&C is organised along four policy and program groups: the Domestic Policy Group (responsible for cities, women's policy, science and innovation, economic policy, infrastructure, social policy, and environmental policy), the National Security and International Policy Group (responsible for counterterrorism, intelligence, national security, cybersecurity, international policy, and defence strategy), the Governance Group, and the Indigenous Affairs Group.

In addition to the National Office in Canberra, the department has 33 offices and an in-community presence in another 60 locations across Australia for the Indigenous Affairs regional network.

Staff are employed as Australian Public Service officials under the Public Service Act 1999. In February 2014, The Canberra Times examined pay conditions and staffing records and found that PM&C is one of the public service's best-paid departments and among its least culturally diverse. The following month, then Secretary Ian Watt told his staff that the department was battling to balance its budget and deliver its programs, and that staff would be cut and service delivery reviewed.

=== Domestic Policy Group ===
The Domestic Policy Group has responsibilities for supporting the development of policy and coordinating implementation across economic, social, and environmental, industry, and infrastructure policy. The Group also coordinates the implementation of whole of government reform, supports government priorities for gender equality and the empowerment of women, coordinates the Council of Australian Governments (COAG) arrangements, provides advice and support for Australian federal budget process, and formulates national policy on public data. The Group is led by Deputy Secretary (Economic), Deputy Secretary (Social Policy), Deputy Secretary (Jobs and Industry).

=== National Security and International Policy Group ===
The National Security and International Policy Group provides the Prime Minister with high quality advice on foreign policy, international trade, overseas aid, international treaties, engagement with foreign governments and international organisations, defence strategy, non-proliferation, information sharing, law enforcement, border security, and crisis coordination and emergency management. The Group also plays a coordinating role in the development of whole of government national security policy, provides secretariat functions to the National Security Committee of Cabinet, and policy settings for the Australian Intelligence Community. The Group also coordinates the foreign affairs, trade and national security aspects of the Australian federal budget.

The Group is led by the Deputy Secretary (National Security). The Group was formerly led by the post of National Security Adviser (NSA) which was established in December 2008 by Prime Minister Kevin Rudd and disbanded in 2013 by Prime Minister Tony Abbott with responsibilities transferred back to the Deputy Secretary of the National Security and International Policy Group. The inaugural NSA was Major General Duncan Lewis serving until 2011. The second and final NSA was Dr Margot McCarthy serving from 2011 to 2013.

=== Governance Group ===
The Governance Group, led by the Deputy Secretary (Governance) provides advice on legal policy, parliamentary and government matters and honours and symbols policy. In addition it provides support services to the Prime Minister, the Cabinet, Cabinet committees, and the department's portfolio ministers and assistant ministers. The group delivers the department's enabling and support functions and also oversees the implementation and ongoing delivery of key Government programmes, policies and initiatives.

=== Portfolio agencies ===
- National Indigenous Australians Agency (NIAA)
- Indigenous Advisory Council (NIA)
- Indigenous Land and Sea Corporation
- Office of AI (est. 15 July 2026)
- Office of the Registrar of Indigenous Corporations
- Office of National Intelligence
- Office of the Official Secretary to the Governor-General
- Australian National Audit Office
- Australian Public Service Commission
- National Australia Day Council
- Workplace Gender Equality Agency
- Central Land Council
- Northern Land Council
- Aboriginal Land Commissioner
- Executive Director of Township Leasing
- Aboriginal Hostels Limited
- Indigenous Business Australia
- Anindilyakwa Land Council
- Tiwi Land Council
- Outback Stores Pty Ltd
- Torres Strait Regional Authority
- Wreck Bay Aboriginal Community Council

== See also ==
- Prime Minister of Australia
- List of Australian Commonwealth Government entities
