= Australian Electoral Commission =

Agency responsible for federal elections in Australia

Agency overview
- Formed: 21 February 1984; 42 years ago
- Jurisdiction: Australian Government
- Headquarters: Canberra
- Employees: 1,043 (as of 30 June 2024)
- Annual budget: A$6.5 million (2024)
- Ministers responsible: Don Farrell, Special Minister of State; Katy Gallagher, Minister for Finance
- Agency executives: Jeff Pope (acting), Electoral Commissioner; Susan Kenny, Chairperson; David Gruen, Non-judicial member
- Parent department: Department of Finance
- Key document: Commonwealth Electoral Act 1918
- Website: aec.gov.au

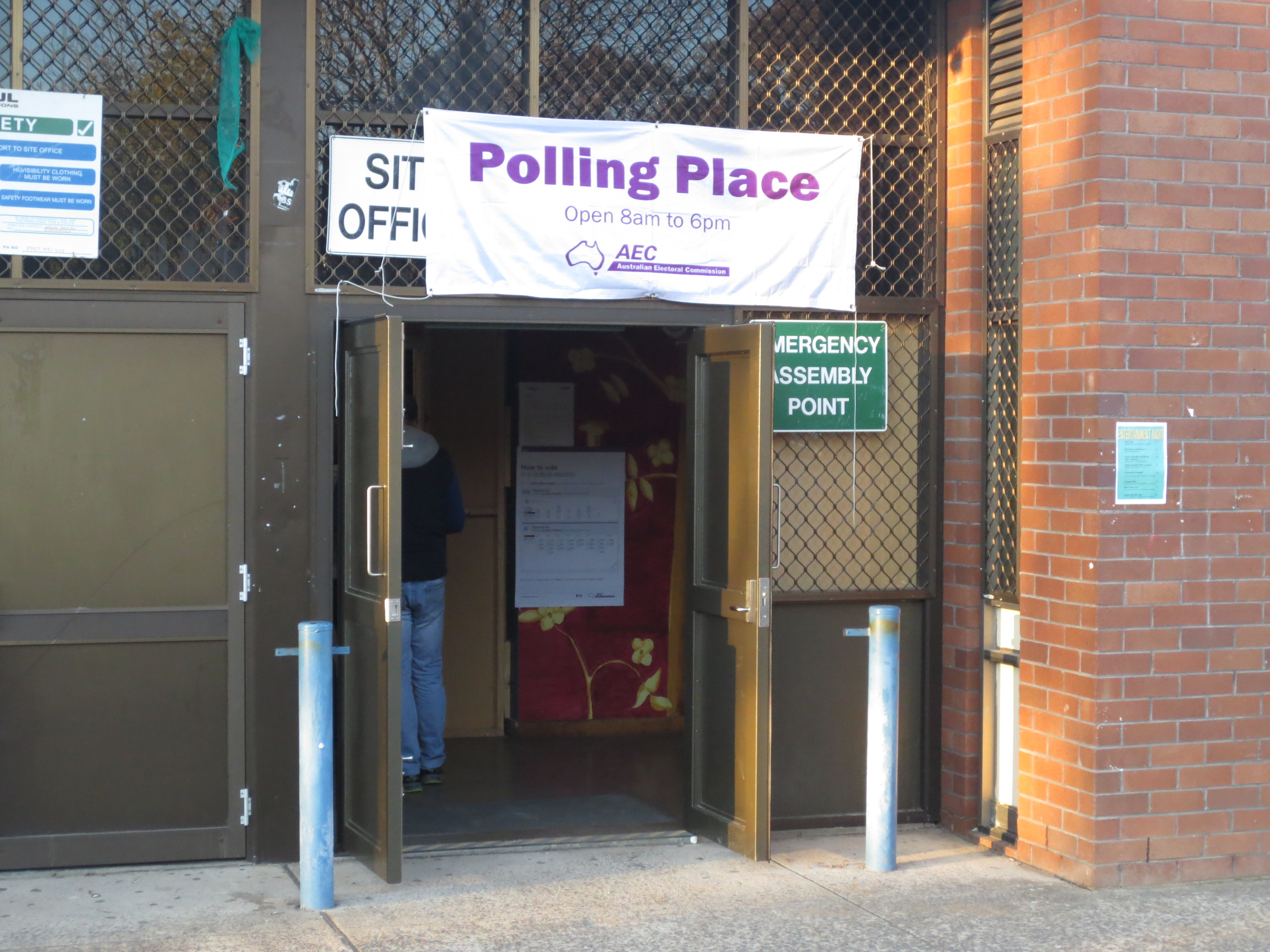
Entrance to polling station run by the Australian Electoral Commission (2016 federal election)

The Australian Electoral Commission (AEC) is the independent statutory agency of the Australian Government responsible for the organisation, conduct and oversight of federal elections, plebiscites, referendums, and certain trade union elections. The AEC ensures compliance with federal electoral laws, including advertising and campaign finance, oversees electoral redistributions, and provides informational and educational resources with a view to promoting trust and understanding of Australia's federal electoral system.

== History ==
The Commonwealth Electoral Act 1902 set up the framework for the Commonwealth electoral system, which was administered until 1916 as a branch of the Department of Home Affairs, by the Department of Home and Territories until 1928, back to Department of Home Affairs to 1932, and then Department of the Interior until 1972. The Australian Electoral Office was created in 1973 by the Australian Electoral Office Act 1973.

In 1984 the Australian Electoral Office was reformed through amendments to the Commonwealth Electoral Act 1918 and is currently known as the Australian Electoral Commission.

After the loss of 1,400 ballots during the recount for the 2013 Western Australia Senate election and the subsequent 2014 special election, the AEC came under significant scrutiny, leading to the resignation of Commissioner Ed Killesteyn.

During the 2023 Australian Indigenous Voice referendum, opposition leader Peter Dutton claimed that the commission's counting process was "rigged", on the basis that the AEC would count ticks as "yes" votes but would not count crosses as "no" votes. Dutton's comments were criticised as undermining faith in Australia's electoral system and of echoing Trumpian misinformation regarding election integrity.

Later in 2023, the commission topped an annual Commonwealth government trust survey, with 87 per cent of respondents indicating some level of trust in the AEC's running of the commission's work, the highest trust rating of any government authority.

Research by pollster DemosAU following the 2025 federal election revealed 67% of Australians trusted the AEC, while 75% trusted that their vote was counted fairly at the election.

== Structure ==
The AEC is accountable to the Joint Standing Committee on Electoral Matters of the Parliament of Australia, and must report on how elections were carried out and the success of elections in general.

As specified under the Commonwealth Electoral Act 1918, the AEC consists of a chairperson (a judge or a retired judge of the Federal Court of Australia), the Electoral Commissioner, and a non-judicial member (usually the Australian Statistician). The Electoral Commissioner has the powers of a secretary of a department under the Public Service Act 1999 and Financial Management and Accountability Act 1998. The chairperson and the third, non-judicial member both hold their offices on a part-time basis.

Each House of Representatives electorate has a Divisional Returning Officer responsible for administration of elections within the division. Each state also has an Australian Electoral Officer responsible for the administration of Senate elections. The AEC has a National Office in Canberra and an office in each state and territory: Adelaide, Brisbane, Darwin, Hobart, Melbourne, Perth, and Sydney.

== Responsibilities ==
The AEC's main role is to conduct federal elections, by-elections and referendums, maintain up-to-date electoral rolls, and administer redistributions undertaken by the separate Redistribution Committee (the Australian Electoral Commission is not directly involved in electoral boundary changes). Under a joint roll arrangement with the states and territories, the AEC maintains enrolment for the whole of Australia, for rolls used in state and local government elections, other than Western Australia. The AEC publishes detailed federal election results and investigates electors who appear to fail to vote, or may have voted multiple times in an election.

The AEC is also responsible for registering political parties intending to field candidates at federal elections, monitoring the activities of those political parties, including receiving returns from parties of donations and expenditures, and the publication of the information. The AEC also plays an electoral education role, aiming to educate citizens about the electoral process by which representatives are elected, and by which the Australian Constitution is changed (referendums). It also plays a role in industrial voting and protected action ballots (e.g., votes on industrial action).

The rules for federal elections are contained in the Commonwealth Electoral Act 1918, while the rules for referendums are contained in the Referendum (Machinery Provisions) Act 1984.

== Registration of political parties ==
The AEC is required to maintain a register of political parties. Such registration is required before a party can field candidates, receive public funding, have party identification on ballot papers and use above-the-line voting in Senate elections.

In all jurisdictions, conditions relating to a party name require party names to have a maximum of six words, not be obscene and not to resemble the name of another, unrelated party, be likely to cause confusion with another party nor contain the word "independent" or "independent party".

All Australian jurisdictions also have a minimum membership requirement, which differs widely, especially when compared with the total number of people enrolled in the jurisdiction. These range from 100 in the Australian Capital Territory and Tasmania, 200 in South Australia, 500 in Victoria and Western Australia, 1,500 for the Commonwealth and 750 in New South Wales. Four jurisdictions require a fee for registration: $500 for the Commonwealth, Victoria and the Northern Territory; and $2,000 for New South Wales.

== Public funding of political parties ==
Since 1984, Australian political parties have been publicly funded by the AEC. The objective of public funding is to reduce the influence of private money upon elections, and consequently, the influence of private money upon the shaping of public policy. After each election, the AEC distributes a set amount of money to each political party, per vote received. A candidate or Senate group needs 4% of the primary vote to be eligible for public funding.

After the 2013 election, political parties and candidates received $58.1 million in election funding, with the funding rate being 248.800 cents per vote. The Liberal Party received $23.9 million, as part of the Coalition total of $27.2 million, while the Labor Party received $20.8 million. Other significant recipients were Australian Greens with $5.5 million, Palmer United Party with $2.3 million, and Liberal Democratic Party with $1.0 million.

In 2016, $62.7 million was distributed, with the funding rate being 262.784 cents per vote.

== Electoral roll ==
One of the functions of the AEC is the maintenance of the electoral roll, which in some other countries are called electoral registers. In Australia the process of getting onto the electoral roll is called "enrolment". The AEC maintains Australia's federal electoral roll, which is used for federal elections, by-elections and referendums. Australia has maintained a permanent federal electoral roll since 1908 and, by amendment to the Commonwealth Electoral Act, enrolment has been compulsory for federal elections since 1924.

Though each state and territory also has its own electoral commission or office, voters need to register only with the AEC, which shares the registration details with the relevant state electoral bodies. The federal roll also forms the basis of state (except in Victoria and Western Australia, which maintain their own roll) and local electoral rolls.

AEC registration covers federal, state and local election voter enrolment. In Australia and in each state or territory, it is an offence to fail to vote without valid or sufficient reason, at any federal or state election, and may be punishable by a nominal monetary penalty. The amount varies between federal and state jurisdictions. Usually, people are issued with warnings when it is found they have not voted, and are given an opportunity to show cause. Acceptable reasons for not voting may include illness, being overseas on election day, religious belief, being incarcerated, etc. "I forgot" is not considered acceptable. Section 245 of the Commonwealth Electoral Act provides that if an elector has been asked the reason for failing to vote and declares a religious belief, this statement shall be regarded as conclusive with no further action being taken.

Traditionally, voters could not register after the Close of Roll for an election. In 2004, the Howard government passed legislation that prevented registration after 8 pm on the day the writs were issued. This can be up to 10 days after the election has been announced. The legislation was considered controversial by some Australians, who contended it disenfranchised first-time voters, or those who forgot to update their enrolment. The law was repealed prior to the 2010 federal election, when advocacy group GetUp! obtained a High Court ruling that the changes were unconstitutional. 16 and 17 year olds can provisionally enrol but are not able to vote until they turn 18.

== List of Australian Electoral Commissioners and predecessors ==
Prior to the creation of the AEC in 1984, the senior electoral officer was designed the Chief Electoral Officer of the Commonwealth.

Commissioner	Term start	Term end
Chief Electoral Officers of the Commonwealth (1901–1984)
George Lewis	15 March 1901	31 May 1905
Walter Bingle	1 June 1905	31 March 1906
Ryton Campbell Oldham	1 April 1906	21 June 1924
Joshua Dyson Farrar	28 August 1924	17 April 1930
Stewart Irwin	18 April 1930	12 November 1932
Frederick John Quinlan	14 November 1932	11 July 1934
Victor Francis Turner	12 July 1934	8 September 1954
Leslie Ainsworth	9 September 1954	1 February 1959
Francis Lyell Ley	2 February 1959	15 July 1976
Keith William Pearson	16 July 1976	21 February 1984
Australian Electoral Commissioners (1984–present)
Colin Hughes	21 February 1984	26 November 1989
Brian Field Cox	18 December 1989	20 December 1994
Wilfred James "Bill" Gray	16 January 1995	14 January 2000
Andy Becker	23 March 2000	1 July 2005
Ian Campbell	2 July 2005	22 September 2008
Ed Killesteyn	5 January 2009	4 July 2014
Tom Rogers	15 December 2014	14 December 2024
Jeff Pope (Note: Appointed in an Acting capacity.)	15 December 2024	Present

== See also ==
- Albert Langer
- Electoral system of Australia
- Compulsory voting
- Getup Ltd v Electoral Commissioner

Electoral commissions of each state and self-governing territory:

- Australian Capital Territory Electoral Commission
- NSW Electoral Commission
- Northern Territory Electoral Commission
- Electoral Commission of Queensland
- Electoral Commission of South Australia
- Tasmanian Electoral Commission
- Victorian Electoral Commission
- Western Australian Electoral Commission
