= Department of External Affairs (1921–1970) =

Australian government department, 1921–1970

Department overview
- Formed: 21 December 1921
- Preceding Department: Prime Minister's Department
- Dissolved: 6 November 1970
- Superseding Department: Department of Foreign Affairs
- Jurisdiction: Commonwealth of Australia
- Department executives: Percy Deane, Secretary (1921–1928); John G. McLaren, Secretary (1929–1933); John Henry Starling, Secretary (1933–1935); William Hodgson, Secretary (1935–1945); William Dunk, Secretary (1945–1947); John Burton, Secretary (1947–1950); Alan Watt, Secretary (1950–1954); Arthur Tange, Secretary (1954–1965); James Plimsoll, Secretary (1965–1970) Keith Waller Secretary (1970)

The Department of External Affairs was an Australian government department that existed between December 1921 and November 1970. There was an Australian government department of the same name between January 1901 and November 1916.

== History ==
When it was first established, the department was linked administratively to the Prime Minister's Department, with the secretary to the Prime Minister's Department also acting as the secretary to the Department of External Affairs. The minister of the department until 1932 was the prime minister of the day. The department was first given its own permanent head in 1935, with William Hodgson appointed Secretary (all previous heads had served simultaneously as secretary of the Prime Minister's Department).

Between 1940 and 1946 the department grew from an organisation with less than 20 people and two overseas posts to one with nearly 300 people, and representatives in 14 countries.

In 1961, the department introduced a special $20,000-a-year language-training program for its junior diplomats. The program was still operating in 1967, with the aim to assist diplomats achieve proficiency in the local languages of the countries in which they were serving.

In 1970, under the Gorton government, the department was abolished and replaced by the new Department of Foreign Affairs. The new department was new in name only and maintained its staff as well as responsibility for the same functions. The old External Affairs title was sometimes causing confusion and the name change to Foreign Affairs, initiated by William McMahon, brought Australia into line with common international practice.

== Scope ==
Information about the department's functions and government funding allocation could be found in the Administrative Arrangements Orders, the annual Portfolio Budget Statements and in the department's annual reports.

The department dealt with:

- Consuls and consular matters
- Foreign affairs
- Foreign intelligence
- Foreign press
- International conferences
- League of Nations (including International Labour Organization and Permanent Court of International Justice)
- Treaties

== Structure ==
The department was a Commonwealth Public Service department, staffed by officials who were responsible to the Minister for External Affairs.

The secretaries of the department were John Henry Starling (1933–35), William Hodgson (1935–45), William Dunk (1945–47), John Burton (1947–50), Alan Watt (1950–54), Arthur Tange (1954–65), James Plimsoll (1965–70) and finally Keith Waller (1970).
