= Department of Post-War Reconstruction =

Australian government department, 1942–1950

Department overview
- Formed: 22 December 1942
- Preceding Department: Department of Labour and National Service
- Dissolved: 16 March 1950
- Superseding Department: Repatriation Department (I) – for re-establishment of ex-servicemen and the Commonwealth reconstruction scheme Prime Minister's Department – for economic policy, education, regional and industrial development Department of the Interior (II) – for War Service Land Settlement and Rural Loans Schemes
- Jurisdiction: Commonwealth of Australia
- Headquarters: Hotel Acton, Canberra
- Ministers responsible: Ben Chifley, Minister (1942–1945); John Dedman, Minister (1945–1949); Eric Harrison, Minister (1949–1950)
- Department executives: H. C. Coombs, Secretary (1943–1948); Allen Brown, Secretary (1949); Finlay Crisp, Secretary (1949–1950)

The Department of Post-War Reconstruction was an Australian Government department responsible for planning and coordinating Australia's transition to a peacetime economy after World War II. The department was established in December 1942 and dissolved in March 1950.

== History ==
The Department of Post-War Reconstruction was established on 22 December 1942 by moving functions from the Department of Labour and National Service. Its role was to plan and coordinate Australia's transition from a war economy with the goal of achieving and maintaining full employment. This reflected the Australian Labor Party government's strong desire to ensure that Australians' standard of living was greater after the war than it had been before it, as well as to avoid a repetition of the poor conditions in which many returned soldiers from World War I lived. Treasurer Ben Chifley was appointed the first Minister for Post-War Reconstruction, and H. C. 'Nugget' Coombs became the department's first director-general on 15 January 1943. Historian David Lee has written that the establishment of the Department of Post-War Reconstruction formed part of the professionalism of the Australian Public Service during World War II.

The department was initially given a wide range of responsibilities. These included overseeing the Government's commitment to full employment, introducing new social welfare payments, establishing the Commonwealth Employment Service, working with the state governments to provide housing and hospitals as well as providing financial support to state universities. The department also drew up the initial plans for the demobilisation of the Australian Military after the war, and these were approved by Cabinet in June 1944. The department's responsibilities changed over time as they were handed to other agencies after being established or completed.

Unlike other departments created during the war, the Department of Post-War Reconstruction did not build up a large staff, but generally sought to coordinate the work of other agencies. Most of the department's employees were young economists who had been conscripted into the Australian Public Service during World War II. John Dedman replaced Chifley as the Minister for Post-War Reconstruction in February 1945, and L.F. Crisp became director-general in 1949 after Coombs was appointed Governor of the Commonwealth Bank.

The Department of Post-War Reconstruction was dissolved on 16 March 1950 following the election of a conservative Liberal Party government in December 1949. Its functions were transferred to other departments; the Economic Policy Division was transferred to the Prime Minister's Department but was subsequently abolished, and the remaining divisions became part of the newly established Department of National Development.
