= Frank Thorpe (public servant) =

Australian public servant (1885–1967)

Frank Gordon CMG, MBE

Public Service Commissioner
- In office 1936–1947

Personal details
- Born: Frank Gordon Thorpe; 15 February 1885
- Died: 30 March 1967 (aged 82)
- Spouse(s): Elsie Rebecca Leake (m. 1917–1921; her death); Vera Hope Donaldson (m. 1926–1967; his death)
- Occupation: Public servant

Frank Gordon Thorpe, CMG, MBE (15 February 1885 – 30 March 1967) was a senior Australian public servant. He was Public Service Commissioner between 1936 and 1947.

== Life and career ==
Frank Thorpe was born on 15 February 1885 in Kooreh, Victoria.

Thorpe started his Commonwealth Public Service career in 1901, one of the Australia's earliest Commonwealth public servants, appointed as a personal clerk to the deputy Postmaster General in the Postmaster-General's Department. When Thorpe volunteered to serve in World War I, he was rejected and instead selected for temporary duty at the Department of Defence.

In 1921 he joined the Prime Minister's Department as a senior clerk.

Thorpe moved to the Commonwealth Public Service Board in 1923, appointed as an assistant-inspector. He was appointed Public Service Commissioner in 1937. He continued working as Commissioner of the Board throughout World War II, including during periods of increasing pressure.

Thorpe retired in 1947 after 49 years in the public service. His farewell function was presided over by Stuart McFarlane, then Secretary of the Treasury and more than 110 senior public servants attended.

After retirement, Thorpe was appointed Chairman of the Overseas Telecommunications Commission Promotions Appeal Board for two years from 1953.

Thorpe died in Canberra in 1967.

== Awards ==
In June 1936, Thorpe was appointed a Member of the Order of the British Empire. He was made a Companion of the Order of St Michael and St George in June 1939 whilst he was serving as Chairman of the Public Service Board.

Government offices
Preceded by William Clemens	Commissioner of the Australian Public Service; 1937–1947	Succeeded by William Dunk
