= James Halligan =

James Halligan may refer to:

- James Halligan (1778–1806), Irishman hanged for murder
- James Halligan (American football) (1879–1965), American football coach
- Jim Halligan (1936–2022), American politician
- James Reginald Halligan (1894–1968), Australian public servant

== See also ==
- Halligan (surname)
