= James Reginald Halligan =

Australian public servant

James Reginald Halligan OBE

Secretary of the Department of External Territories
- In office 11 May 1944 – 11 May 1951

Personal details
- Born: 8 November 1894 East Melbourne
- Died: 21 November 1968 (aged 74) Canberra
- Spouse: Marjorie Millicent Halligan (née Grosvenor)(OBE) (m. 1936–1968)
- Education: University of Melbourne
- Occupation: Public servant

James Reginald Halligan OBE (8 November 1894 – 21 November 1968) was a senior Australian public servant. Between 1944 and 1951, he was Secretary of the Department of External Territories.

== Life and career ==
Halligan was born on 8 November 1894 in East Melbourne to Jane and John J. Halligan. He attended Christian Brothers College, St Kilda.

He joined the Commonwealth Public Service in the Department of External Affairs in 1911 and moved to the Department of Home and Territories when it was established in 1916.

After obtaining a diploma of commerce from the University of Melbourne in 1927, he moved to Canberra.

In 1934, Halligan participated in the first air mail flight to New Guinea, captained by pioneer aviator Charles Ulm. Halligan was head of the territories section of the Prime Minister's Department in 1941 when the Department of External Territories was created, when he became an Assistant Secretary.

From 1944 to 1951, Halligan was Secretary of the Department of External Territories. When Paul Hasluck was appointed Minister for Territories in 1951 he was made a special adviser to the Minister. As an adviser, Halligan was freed from routine administration work to focus primarily on United Nations Trusteeship Council matters. He remained employed as an adviser to Hasluck until his retirement in 1959.

Halligan died on 21 November 1968 in Canberra.

== Awards ==
Halligan was made an Officer of the Order of the British Empire in 1960.

Government offices
Preceded by Frank Strahan	Secretary of the Department of External Territories; 1944 – 1951	Succeeded by Cyril Lambert as Secretary of the Department of Territories
