= Halligan (surname) =

- Pronunciation: /ˈhælɪɡən/

Origin
- Region of origin: Ireland

Other names
- Variant forms: Ó hAilechain, Ó hAleagain, O'Halligan

Halligan is a surname of Irish origin, deriving from Irish Ó hAilechain or Ó hAleagain. Bearers include:

- Bob Halligan, Jr. (born 1953), American Christian rock musician
- Brendan Halligan (1936–2020), Irish economist and politician
- Brian Halligan, American CEO of HubSpot
- Caitlin Halligan (born 1966), American lawyer and judicial nominee
- Danny Halligan (born 1965), New Zealand soccer player
- Daryl Halligan (born 1966), New Zealand rugby league player
- Dick Halligan (1943–2022), American jazz-rock musician
- James Halligan (1778–1806), Irishman hanged for murder in America
- James Reginald Halligan (1894–1968), Australian public servant
- Jim Halligan (1936-2022), American politician from Oklahoma
- Jocko Halligan (1868–1945), US baseball player
- John Halligan (ice hockey) (1941–2010), US ice hockey executive
- John Halligan (born 1955), Irish politician
- John Halligan, Jr. (1876–1934), US Navy admiral
- Johnny Halligan (1899–1977), Scottish footballer
- Liam Halligan (born 1969), UK economist and journalist
- Lindsey Halligan, White House official
- Mike Halligan (born 1949), American politician from Montana
- Ray Halligan (born 1939), Australian politician
- Ryan Halligan (1989–2003), American student who committed suicide after being bullied
- Ursula Halligan, Irish broadcaster
- William Halligan (actor) (1883–1957), American stage and film actor
- William ("Billy") Halligan (1886–1950), Irish professional association football player
- William J. Halligan (1898–1992), founder of Hallicrafters

== See also ==
- Suicide of Ryan Halligan
- Senator Halligan (disambiguation)
