= John McLaren (public servant) =

Australian public servant (1871–1958)

Sir John McLaren CMG

Secretary of the Department of Home and Territories
- In office 18 March 1921 – 10 June 1928

Secretary of the Prime Minister's Department
- In office 1 January 1929 – 2 March 1933

Personal details
- Born: John Gilbert McLaren; 15 October 1871 Parramatta, New South Wales
- Died: 27 July 1958 (aged 86) Strathfield, New South Wales
- Education: University of Sydney (BA)
- Occupation: Public servant

Sir John Gilbert McLaren, CMG (15 October 1871 – 27 July 1958) was a senior Australian public servant. He was a commissioner of the Public Service Board, Secretary of the Prime Minister's Department and served an appointment as official secretary, High Commissioner's Office in London.

== Life and career ==
John McLaren was born in Parramatta, New South Wales, on 15 October 1871. He was educated at Sydney Boys High School.

In 1901, McLaren joined the Commonwealth Public Service in the Postmaster-General's Department.

Between 1921 and June 1928, McLaren was Secretary of the Department of Home and Territories.

In June 1928, McLaren was promoted to the Public Service Board as second member. He departed his Board position in December 1928, to take on the role of Secretary of the Prime Minister's Department.

McLaren died in Strathfield, New South Wales, on 27 July 1958.

== Awards ==
McLaren was appointed a Companion of the Order of St Michael and St George in 1925, and made a Knight Bachelor in June 1935 while Secretary of the London High Commission.

Government offices
Preceded by Atlee Hunt	Secretary of the Department of Home and Territories; 1921–1928	Succeeded by William Clemens
Preceded by Brudenell White	Public Service Commissioner; 1928; With: W.J. Skewes 1923–1931; John Patrick McGlinn 1923–1930	Succeeded by William Clemens
Preceded by Percy Deane	Secretary of the Department of External Affairs; 1929–1933	Succeeded by John Henry Starling
Preceded by Percy Deane	Secretary of the Prime Minister's Department; 1929–1933	Succeeded by John Henry Starling
