= Frederick Wheeler (public servant) =

Australian public servant

Sir Frederick Wheeler AC, CBE

Secretary of the Department of the Treasury
- In office 1 November 1971 – 8 January 1979

Personal details
- Born: Frederick Henry Wheeler; 9 January 1914
- Died: 5 August 1994 (aged 80)
- Occupation: Public servant

Sir Frederick Henry Wheeler AC, CBE (9 January 1914 – 5 August 1994) was a senior Australian public servant. He was Secretary of the Department of the Treasury from 1971 to 1979.

== Life and career ==
Frederick Wheeler was born on 9 January 1914. He was educated at Trinity Grammar School and Scotch College in Melbourne.

Wheeler began his Commonwealth public service career in 1939 in the Department of the Treasury. He rose to become Chairman of the Public Service Board, serving in the position for 10 years between 1961 and 1971. During his time at the Board, he reorganised its structure and put in a place a new, more professional qualification-based recruitment system.

He was appointed Secretary of the Treasury in November 1971.

== Honours ==
Wheeler was appointed an Officer of the Order of the British Empire (OBE) in 1952, and a Commander of the Order (CBE) in 1962.

He was knighted in 1967. Sir Frederick Wheeler was made a Companion of the Order of Australia in January 1979.

== Notes ==
Government offices
| Preceded by William Dunk | Chairman of the Public Service Board; 1961–1971 | Succeeded by Alan Cooley |
| Preceded by Dick Randall | Secretary of the Department of the Treasury; 1971–1979 | Succeeded by John Stone |
