= H. C. Coombs =

Australian public servant (1906–1997)

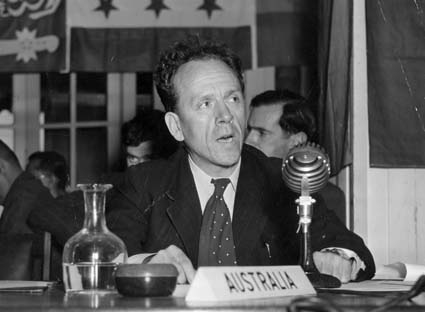
- Coombs at the Lapstone Conference in 1948

1st Governor of the Reserve Bank of Australia
- In office January 1960 – July 1968
- Preceded by: Office created
- Succeeded by: J. G. Phillips

Secretary of the Department of Post-War Reconstruction
- In office 2 February 1943 – 31 December 1948

Personal details
- Born: Herbert Cole Coombs; 24 February 1906 Kalamunda, Western Australia, Australia
- Died: 29 October 1997 (aged 91) Sydney, New South Wales, Australia
- Education: University of Western Australia (BA (Hons); MA); London School of Economics (PhD)
- Profession: Economist

Herbert Cole "Nugget" Coombs (24 February 1906 – 29 October 1997) was an Australian economist and public servant. He was the first governor of the Reserve Bank of Australia, in which capacity he served from 1960 to 1968. He is noted for his contributions to the arts, environment, and Indigenous justice movement.

== Early years and education ==
Herbert Cole "Nugget" Coombs was born on 24 February 1906 in Kalamunda, Western Australia, one of six children of a country railway stationmaster and a well-read mother.

Coombs's political and economic views were formed by the Great Depression, which hit Australia in 1929 and caused a complete economic collapse in a country totally dependent on commodity exports for its prosperity. As a student in Perth, he was a socialist, but while he was studying at the London School of Economics, he became converted to the economic views of John Maynard Keynes. He spent the rest of his career pursuing Keynesian solutions to Australia's economic problems. He never sought public office nor joined a political party, but he sought to exercise political influence as an administrator and advisor.

He won a scholarship to Perth Modern School. After five years there, he worked as a pupil-teacher for a year before spending two years at the Teachers' College. He then spent two years teaching at country schools, during which he studied for a Bachelor of Arts degree in the University of Western Australia (UWA), then the only free university in Australia. Transferring to a metropolitan school for the final two years, he graduated B.A. with first-class honours in economics and won a Hackett Studentship for overseas study. That was deferred for a year, enabling him to graduate M.A., also from UWA, and to marry fellow teacher Mary Alice ('Lallie') Ross at the end of 1931. As a student at UWA, Coombs was elected as the 1930 Sports Council president and subsequently the 1931 president of the Guild of Undergraduates. He then proceeded to the London School of Economics, where he studied under Harold Laski, one of the most influential Marxists of the 20th century. In 1933, he was awarded a PhD for a thesis on central banking.

In 1934, he returned to a teaching position in Perth and combined it with part-time lecturing in economics at UWA.

== Public service ==
In 1935, he became an economist at the Commonwealth Bank, then a state-owned bank that served as Australia's central bank. In 1939, he shifted to the Department of the Treasury in Canberra as a senior economist. He became known as a Keynesian rebel against the classical economics theory that had dominated the Treasury, under the influence of the Melbourne University school of economists, led by L. F. Giblin and Douglas Copland.

The Australian Labor Party under John Curtin came to power in 1941, and Coombs found himself in a political environment much more supportive of his views. Curtin appointed him to the Commonwealth Bank board in October 1941. In 1942, the Treasurer, Ben Chifley, appointed him Director of Rationing, and in 1943 made him Director-General of the Department of Post-war Reconstruction, a new ministry that Chifley held in addition to the Treasury. Coombs played a leading role in the preparation of the White Paper on Full Employment in Australia which, for the first time, committed the government to maintaining full employment from the post-WWII years.

Chifley, a former train driver, had no training in economics and came to rely heavily on Coombs's advice. Coombs's closeness to Chifley and the greatly expanded role of government in the economy during World War II made him one of the most powerful public servants in Australian history. His influence further expanded when Chifley became prime minister in 1945.

In January 1949, Chifley appointed Coombs as governor of the Commonwealth Bank, the most important post in the regulation of the Australian economy. When the Liberal Party came to power in December of that year, however, Coombs's demise seemed likely, but the new prime minister, Robert Menzies, kept him on and soon came to trust his judgement. Menzies was a moderate Keynesian, and there were few policy differences between the two men, especially since Australia soon embarked on a long postwar boom, and hardly any tough economic decisions needed to be made.

In 1960, when the Reserve Bank of Australia was created to take over the Commonwealth Bank's central banking functions, Coombs was appointed governor of the Reserve Bank. At the time, he paid tribute to Sir Leslie Melville by advising the government and others that the best man for the job had been overlooked.

He retired as a public servant in 1968.

== Later life ==
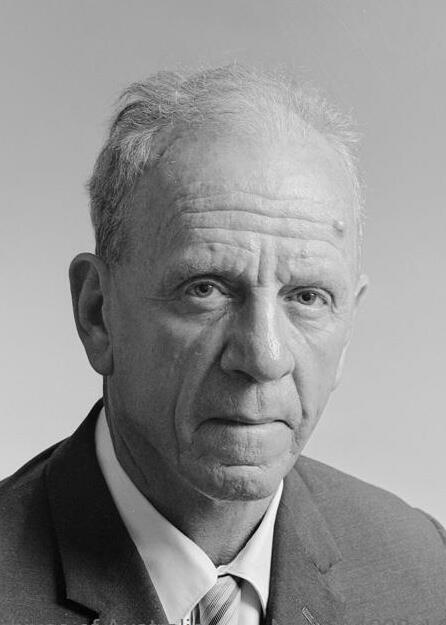
Coombs c. 1970

=== Aboriginal affairs ===
Coombs's most important post-retirement role was as a supporter of the Australian Aboriginal people. In 1967, he became chairman of the Council for Aboriginal Affairs, set up by the Holt government in the wake of the referendum that gave the Commonwealth Parliament power to legislate specifically for the Aboriginal people. He was, however, disappointed that the Gorton and McMahon governments took up few of the Council's recommendations. In 1968, he supported the Wuyul petition created by Yolngu people of the Gove Peninsula, to rename the new mining town there Nhulunbuy, which was successful. In a speech to the ABC, Coombs quoted words from a letter sent by Roy Marika to politicians and media, saying: "as long as we have minds to think with, eyes to see with, surely there can be an effort on both sides to understand each other's language and customs", which was widely reported.

He became a close advisor to the Labor leader Gough Whitlam in the years before Whitlam became prime minister in 1972, and he largely wrote Labor's policy on Aboriginal affairs, particularly the commitment to Aboriginal land rights. In December 1972, as chair of the Office of Aboriginal Affairs, Coombs received a delegation from the Aboriginal Housing Committee, based in Redfern, Sydney, applying for a grant to improve housing for Aboriginal people in the area. Their application for a grant was successful, enabling the AHC to commence purchasing houses which led to the creation of the Aboriginal-run housing project, The Block.

=== Other activities ===
Coombs continued to work following his retirement. He had already signalled his interest in the arts by becoming the first chairman of the Australian Elizabethan Theatre Trust in 1954 (named in honour of Elizabeth II, not because it promoted Elizabethan theatre). In 1967, he persuaded Prime Minister Harold Holt to create the Australian Council for the Arts (the non-statutory predecessor to the Australia Council) as a body for the public funding of the arts, and in 1968, he became its chairman. He worked closely with Prime Minister John Gorton to secure funding for an Australian film industry. He also became chancellor of the Australian National University (1968–1976), which he had helped found in 1946. He delivered the 1970 Buntine Oration, titled "Human Values – Education in the Changing Australian Society."

In 1972, he was The Australian's inaugural Australian of the Year, an award created in competition to the more widely recognised Victorian Australia Day Council's Australian of the Year.

From 1972 to 1975, Coombs served as a consultant to Prime Minister Whitlam, but his influence was resented by other ministers. He found the experience of the first Labor government since 1949 disappointing. He disapproved of the events that led up to the Loans Affair of 1975 and the 1975 Australian constitutional crisis, which led to the dismissal of Whitlam's government by the Governor-General, Sir John Kerr. He advised Whitlam not to resort to unorthodox means of financing government operations when the Senate blocked supply, but Whitlam did so anyway. Although he regarded the dismissal as scandalous, his estrangement from Whitlam meant that he took little subsequent part in politics.

In 1974, Whitlam announced the Royal Commission on Australian Government Administration, chaired by Coombs, which was tasked with examining the purpose, functions, organisation and management of Australian Government bodies and the structure and management of the Australian Public Service. The commission reported in 1976 recommending greater autonomy for public servants' decisions. this included employment and finance decisions that had been controlled by central departments such as the Public Service Board. Public servants would also be subject to performance reviews. The Liberal government of Malcolm Fraser largely ignored the recommendations, focusing on reducing the size of the Public Service and introducing accountability mechanisms.

In 1976, Coombs resigned all his posts and became a visiting fellow at the Centre for Resource and Environmental Studies at the Australian National University, where he developed a new interest in environmental issues. However, Aboriginal affairs remained his greatest passion and, in 1979, he launched the Aboriginal Treaty Committee, calling for a formal treaty between Australia and the Aboriginal people. The idea gained much public support but neither the Fraser government nor its successor, Bob Hawke's Labor government, took it up. From 1977 to 1979, Coombs was the president of the Australian Conservation Foundation.

Coombs deplored the breakdown of the postwar Keynesian economic consensus, represented by Thatcherism, and in his 1990 book The Return of Scarcity he proposed a Common Wealth Estate to ensure a more equitable distribution of wealth.

== Recognition ==
Coombs was appointed a Companion of the Order of Australia in the first awards of the Order on the Queen's Birthday in 1975. However, he resigned from the Order in 1976 upon the introduction of the grade of knighthood to the Order.

== Death and legacy ==
Coombs suffered a disabling stroke in late 1995 and died in Sydney in 1997.

During the Howard government administration, the "Coombs legacy" in Aboriginal affairs came under increasing criticism from conservative thinkers. Journalist Piers Akerman argued that Coombs's policy amounted to "politically correct apartheid", and that the communal land ownership implicit in Aboriginal land rights was keeping Aboriginal people poor and dependent on welfare by preventing the private ownership of land. By contrast, many Aboriginal people retained strong support for Coombs' advocacy, and viewed his work as a precursor of the growth in the Aboriginal rights movement in the 21st century, as was noted by Philip Lowe, governor of the Reserve Bank of Australia, on a trip to Yirrkala in 2019.

In January 2008, it was announced that a new suburb in the Canberra district of Molonglo would be named Coombs. It is adjacent to the suburb of Wright, named for Judith Wright.

== Personal life ==
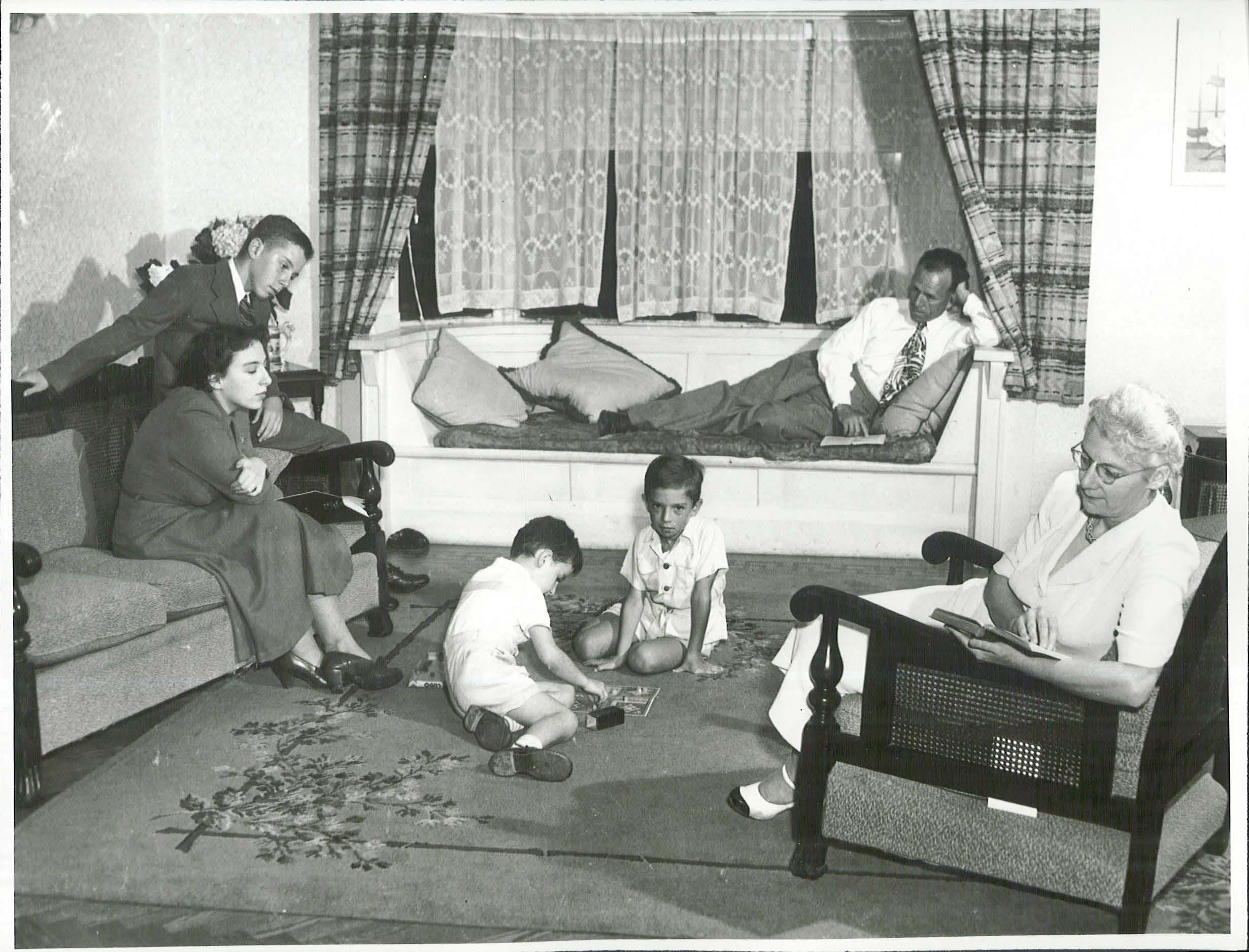
John, Janet, Jerry, Jim (looking to camera) Nugget and Lallie Coombs, March 1951

Coombs married teacher Mary Alice "Lallie" Ross at the end of 1931. Nugget and Lallie had four children: Janet (later among the first women admitted to the New South Wales bar), John (later a Queen’s Counsel), Jim (barrister and magistrate), and Jerry (an anaesthetist).

In a June 2009 article in The Monthly, journalist Fiona Capp revealed the story of the 25-year secret love affair between "the famous poet-cum-activist" Judith Wright and "the distinguished yet down-to-earth statesman" Coombs.

Government offices
| New title Department established | Secretary of the Department of Post-War Reconstruction; 1943–1948 | Succeeded by Allen Brown |
| Preceded by Hugh Armitage | Governor of the Commonwealth Bank of Australia; 1949–1960 | Position abolished |
| New title | Governor of the Reserve Bank of Australia; 1960–1968 | Succeeded by J. G. Phillips |
Academic offices
| Preceded by Baron Florey | Chancellor of the Australian National University; 1968–1976 | Succeeded by Sir John Crawford |
