= Department of External Territories (1941–1951) =

Australian government department, 1941–1951

Department overview
- Formed: 26 June 1941
- Preceding Department: Prime Minister's Department – the Territories Branch
- Dissolved: 11 May 1951
- Superseding Department: Department of Territories (I)
- Jurisdiction: Commonwealth of Australia
- Headquarters: Barton, Canberra
- Ministers responsible: Allan McDonald, Minister (1941); James Fraser, Minister (1941–1943); Eddie Ward, Minister (1943–1949); Percy Spender, Minister (1949–1951); Richard Casey, Minister (1951)
- Department executives: Frank Strahan, Secretary (1941–1944); James Reginald Halligan, Secretary (1944–1951)

The Department of External Territories was an Australian government department that existed between June 1941 and May 1951.

== Scope ==
Information about the department's functions and government funding allocation could be found in the Administrative Arrangements Orders, the annual Portfolio Budget Statements and in the Department's annual reports.

The matters dealt with by the department at its creation were:

- The administration of the Territories of Nauru, New Guinea, Norfolk Island and Papua
- Shipping services to certain Pacific Islands and the Territory of Papua and New Guinea
- The transfer of prisoners from Territories outside the Commonwealth

== Structure ==
The Department was a Commonwealth Public Service department, staffed by officials who were responsible to the Minister for External Territories.
