= Prime Minister's Department (disambiguation) =

Prime Minister's Department is a department or other government agency that directly supports the work of the government's central executive office.

Prime Minister's Department may also refer to:

- Prime Minister's Department (Australia) Department,ent of the Australian Government active from 1911 to 1971
  - Department of the Prime Minister and Cabinet (Australia) for the current department in the Australian Government
- Prime Minister's Department (Malaysia)
