= William Dunk =

Australian public servant

Sir William Dunk CBE

Secretary of the Department of External Affairs
- In office 10 September 1945 – 25 March 1947

Personal details
- Born: William Ernest Dunk; 1897
- Died: 1984 (aged 86–87)
- Spouse: Elma Kathleen Evans (m. 1922)
- Children: Pat and Peter
- Occupation: Public servant

Sir William Ernest Dunk, CBE (1897–1984) was a senior official in the Australian Public Service.

== Life and career ==
William Dunk was born in 1897.

He joined the Commonwealth Public Service in 1914 as a Clerk in the Auditor-General's Office. He rose to hold positions including the Assistant Secretary for War Administration in the Department of the Treasury and Director of Reciprocal Land Lease in the Department of External Affairs.

Between 1945 and 1947 he was Secretary of the Department of External Affairs. In 1947, Dunk was appointed chairman of the Public Service Board, succeeding commissioner Frank Thorpe. Well ahead of time, in October 1959, Dunk advised the Australian Government that he wished to retire in early 1961. He retired officially from the chairmanship on 31 December 1960.

Dunk was interviewed by Mel Pratt in 1971. The recording can be found in the National Library of Australia.

After retirement, he was invited to New Zealand to advise the New Zealand Government on public service matters.

== Awards and honours ==
Dunk was appointed a Commander of the Order of the British Empire in June 1953 in recognition of his service as Chairman of the Public Service Board. In 1957 he was made a Knight Bachelor.

In 2009, a street in the Canberra suburb of Casey was named Dunk Street in William Dunk's honour.

Government offices
Preceded by William Hodgson	Secretary of the Department of External Affairs; 1945–1947	Succeeded by John Burton
Preceded by Frank Thorpe	Chairman of the Public Service Board; 1947–1960	Succeeded by Frederick Wheeler
