= Helligan =

Helligan may refer to:

- Helligan, a manor house in St Mabyn, Cornwall
- Helen Helligan, a character in the DC Comics Shining Knight books
- John Helligan, MP for Liskeard (UK Parliament constituency)

== See also ==
- Halligan (disambiguation)
