= Allen Brown (public servant) =

Australian public servant

Sir Allen Brown CBE

Secretary of the Department of Post-War Reconstruction
- In office 1 January 1949 – 24 August 1949

Secretary of the Prime Minister's Department
- In office 25 August 1949 – 31 December 1958

Personal details
- Born: 3 July 1911
- Died: 2 August 1999 (aged 88)
- Spouse: Hilda (m. 1936; d. 1997)
- Children: 3
- Education: University of Melbourne (MA, LLM)
- Occupation: Public servant

Sir Allen Stanley Brown CBE (3 July 1911 – 2 August 1999) was an Australian public servant who was Secretary of the Prime Minister's Department from 1949 to 1958.

== Life and career ==
Allen Brown was born on 3 July 1911. He was educated at Caulfield Grammar School, Wesley College and the University of Melbourne.

In 1949, Brown served as Secretary of the Department of Post-War Reconstruction. During his time at the Department, Brown was instrumental in establishing the Snowy Mountains Scheme.

Brown was Secretary of the Prime Minister's Department between August 1949 and December 1958. From the Prime Minister's Department, Brown's next appointment was in the diplomatic service, he was Deputy High Commissioner for Australia in the United Kingdom.

In 1965, Brown was appointed Australian Ambassador to Japan. While in that role, he led the Australian delegation which observed the 1967 South Vietnamese presidential election. The delegation was invited by the South Vietnamese Government, and Brown observed polling in Huế.

Brown retired from the Commonwealth public service in 1971.

== Awards ==
Brown was made a Commander of the Order of the British Empire in January 1953. He was named a Knight Bachelor in January 1956.

== Notes ==
Government offices
Preceded by H. C. Coombs	Secretary of the Department of Post-War Reconstruction; 1949	Succeeded by Finlay Crisp
Preceded by Frank Strahan	Secretary of the Prime Minister's Department; 1949 – 1959	Succeeded by John Bunting
Diplomatic posts
Preceded by Laurence McIntyre	Australian Ambassador to Japan; 1965–1970	Succeeded by Gordon Freeth
