= John Burton (diplomat) =

Australian diplomat and academic (1915–2010)

- Born: 2 March 1915; Melbourne, Australia
- Died: 23 June 2010 (aged 95); Sydney, Australia
- Education: Newington College; University of Sydney; London School of Economics
- Occupations: Public servant, author, academic

John Wear Burton (2 March 1915 – 23 June 2010) was an Australian public servant, high commissioner and academic.

== Early life ==
Burton was born in Melbourne, the son of the Rev John Wear Burton, a Methodist Minister. He was educated at Newington College (1924–1932) and went on to graduate from the University of Sydney in 1937.

== Public service ==
In 1937 Burton became a member of the Commonwealth Public Service from where he was granted a Commonwealth scholarship to pursue a doctorate at the London School of Economics. He joined the Department of External Affairs in 1941 and served as private secretary to Herbert Vere Evatt. In 1947, aged 32, he became Secretary of the Department of External Affairs and held that position until June 1950. At the beginning of 1951 he took up the position of Australian High Commissioner to Ceylon, but resigned to return home and contest the Federal election of that year in the electorate of Lowe. As the Australian Labor Party (ALP) candidate he was beaten by William McMahon, a future Prime Minister of Australia.

== Academic career ==
While writing his first book, The Alternative, Burton farmed outside Canberra and owned a bookshop in the suburb of Kingston. In 1960 he was awarded a fellowship at the Australian National University. Two years later the Rockefeller Foundation awarded him a grant to study neutralism in Africa and Asia. In 1963, while a Reader in International Relations at University College University of London, he established the Centre for the Analysis of Conflict. He then went on to hold fellowships at numerous universities while living in Canberra.

Burton introduced the terminology of "rooted causes of conflict," which focuses on unmet human needs as the source of conflicts. Burton's view was that conflicts often emerge where there are social inequalities and barriers to people's needs for identity and participation. In such situations, communities may resort to violence to protect what they deem as their values or culture.

== Death ==
Burton died in a Canberra hospital on 23 June 2010 after suffering a stroke. He was survived by his third wife, Betty, and three children from the prior marriages. Another daughter predeceased him.

== Legacy ==
In introducing Burton as a guest on Radio National, Phillip Adams said; "John Burton was probably the most controversial and visionary public servant of the 20th Century. Branded a pink eminence of the Labor Party by conservative critics, he was clearly one of the most important intellectuals and policy-makers associated with the Curtin Labor Government of the 1940s. As a close associate of 'Doc' Evatt and head of the department of External Affairs (now Foreign Affairs) he did more to shape Australian foreign policy towards Asia and the Pacific than any other person before or since."

Burton's theoretical work on conflict resolution has been highly influential in setting up conflict resolution as an academic discipline in its own right, which is very much needed in the modern globalised world because of the greater potential for disputes between different ethnic and religious communities. In Australia, Burton's work greatly influenced the pioneering course in conflict resolution at Macquarie University, Sydney.

== Scholarships, fellowships and grants ==
- Scholarship – London School of Economics (1941)
- Fellowship – Australian National University (1960)
- Grant – Rockefeller Foundation (1962)
- Fellowship – University of South Carolina (1982)
- Fellowship – University of Maryland (1983)
- Fellowship – George Mason University (1982)

== Publications ==
- "The Alternative" (1954)
- "Labour in transition" (1957)
- "International relations: a general theory" (1965)
- "Systems, States, Diplomacy and Rules" (1968)
- "Controlled communication" (1969)
- "World society" (1972)
- "Internationale politiek" (1974)
- "Deviance, terrorism & war: the process of solving unsolved social and political problems" (1979)
- "Resolving deep-rooted conflict: a handbook" (1987)
- "Conflict resolution as a political system" (1988)
- "On the need for conflict prevention" (1989)
- "Conflict: resolution & provention [The Conflict Series vol 1]" (1990)
- "Conflict: human needs theory [The Conflict Series vol 2]" (1993)
- "Conflict: readings in management and resolution [The Conflict Series vol 3]" (1990)
- "Conflict: practices in management, settlement and resolution [The Conflict Series vol 4]" (1990)
- "Conflict resolution: its language and processes" (1996)

== Sources ==
- Dunn, David J. (2004), From Power Politics to Conflict Resolution: The Work of John W Burton, London: Palgrave Macmillan
- Henry, Adam Hughes (2024). "Beyond the limits: Australian anti-communism and the unforgiving 1950s" (PDF). Australian Journal of Biography and History. 8: 7–27. doi:10.22459/AJBH.08.2024.

Government offices
Preceded by William Dunk	Secretary of the Department of External Affairs; 1947–1950	Succeeded by Alan Watt
Diplomatic posts
Preceded by Charles Frost	Australian High Commissioner to Ceylon; 1951	Succeeded by Alex Borthwick as Chargé d'affaires
