= Henry Walters (public servant) =

Australian public servant

Henry Walters ISO

Secretary of the Department of Works and Railways
- In office 12 April 1926 – 17 March 1929

Personal details
- Born: Henry Latimer Walters; 24 January 1868 Newcastle, New South Wales
- Died: 17 March 1929 (aged 61) St Kilda, Melbourne, Victoria
- Resting place: Cheltenham cemetery
- Occupation: Public servant

Henry Latimer Walters ISO (24 January 1868 – 17 March 1929) was a senior Australian public servant, best known for his time as head of the Department of Works and Railways.

== Life and career ==
Walters was born in Newcastle, New South Wales on 24 January 1868.

Shortly after Federation, in 1902, he joined the Commonwealth Public Service as an accountant.

Between 1926 and his death in 1929, Walters was Secretary of the Department of Works and Railways.

Walters died at his home on Tennyson Street in St Kilda, Melbourne on 17 March 1929 after 18 months of illness. He was buried in Cheltonham cemetery.

== Awards ==
Walters was made a Companion of the Imperial Service Order for his services as Secretary of the Commonwealth Works Department in June 1928.

Government offices
Preceded by Walter Bingle	Secretary of the Department of Works and Railways; 1926 – 1929	Succeeded by Percival Gourgaud
