= Department of External Territories =

Department of External Territories may refer to:

- Department of External Territories (1941–51), an Australian government department
- Department of External Territories (1968–73), an Australian government department
