= Frank Strahan =

Australian public servant

Frank Strahan CBE CVO

Secretary of the Prime Minister's Department
- In office 11 November 1935 – 24 August 1949

Secretary of the Department of External Territories
- In office 26 June 1941 – 10 May 1944

Personal details
- Born: 2 July 1886 Fryerstown, Victoria
- Died: 4 May 1976 (aged 89) Camberwell, Melbourne, Victoria
- Spouse: Ella Mary Moore (m. 1914–1965; her death)
- Occupation: Public servant

Frank Strahan CVO CBE (2 July 1886 – 4 May 1976) was a senior Australian public servant. Between 1935 and 1949, he was Secretary of the Prime Minister's Department.

== Life and career ==
Strahan was born in Fryerstown, Victoria on 2 July 1886.

In November 1935, Strahan was appointed Secretary of the Prime Minister's Department. In the role, he became the first member of the Commonwealth Public Service to attend Cabinet when he attended a meeting of the Third Menzies Ministry in July 1941.

In 1941 when the Department of External Territories was established (it was previously an office in the Prime Minister's Department), Strahan was named its Secretary. Strahan served in dual roles at the head of the Territories Department and the Prime Minister's Department until 1944, when J.R. Halligan was appointed to head the Department of External Territories.

Strahan retired in August 1949. He died on 4 May 1976 in Camberwell, and his body was cremated.

== Awards ==
Whilst an Assistant Secretary at the Prime Minister's Department in June 1928, Strahan was made a Commander of the Order of the British Empire. In April 1935 he was appointed a Commander of the Royal Victorian Order.

Government offices
Preceded by John Henry Starling	Secretary of the Prime Minister's Department; 1935 – 1949	Succeeded by Allen Brown
New title Department established	Secretary of the Department of External Territories; 1941 – 1944	Succeeded by James Reginald Halligan
