= Department of Works and Railways =

Australian government department, 1916–1932

Department overview
- Formed: 14 November 1916
- Preceding Department: Department of Home Affairs
- Dissolved: 12 April 1932
- Superseding Department: Department of the Interior
- Jurisdiction: Commonwealth of Australia
- Headquarters: Melbourne
- Department executives: David Miller, Secretary (1916–1917); Walter Bingle, Secretary (1917–1926); Henry Walters, Secretary (1926–1929); Percival Gourgaud, Secretary (1929–1932)

The Department of Works and Railways was an Australian government department that existed between November 1916 and April 1932.

At its abolition, its functions were absorbed into the Department of the Interior.

== Scope ==
Information about the department's functions and government funding allocation could be found in the Administrative Arrangements Orders, the annual Portfolio Budget Statements and in the department's annual reports.

At its creation, the department was responsible for the following:

- Public works
- Railways
- Rivers

The department was responsible for preparing the plans to build Old Parliament House. It also prepared building plans for retail trading blocks in Manuka, Australian Capital Territory.

== Structure ==
The department was a Commonwealth Public Service department, staffed by officials who were responsible to the Minister for Works and Railways. In order of appointment, the Department's Ministers were: Patrick Lynch, William Watt, Richard Foster, Percy Stewart, William Hill, William Gibson, Joseph Lyons, Albert Green and Charles Marr.
