= William Clemens (public servant) =

Australian public servant (1873–1941)

Sir William James Clemens CMG, ISO

Secretary of the Department of Home and Territories
- In office 11 June 1928 – 9 December 1928

Secretary of the Department of Home Affairs
- In office 10 December 1928 – 31 December 1928

Chairman of the Public Service Board
- In office 23 April 1933 – 26 March 1937

Personal details
- Born: William James Clemens; 27 March 1873 Beechworth, Victoria
- Died: 4 September 1941 (aged 68) Melbourne, Victoria
- Spouse(s): 1) Lillie White (m.1899, died 1911). 2) Belle Webster (m.1914).
- Occupation: Public servant

Sir William James Clemens, CMG, ISO (27 March 1873 – 4 September 1941) was a senior Australian public servant, best known for his service to the Commonwealth Public Service Board.

== Life and career ==
Clemens was born at Spring Creek, Beechworth, Victoria on 27 March 1873. His parents were James and Catherine Clemens.

Clemens joined the Victorian Public Service in 1899. In 1901, the year of Federation, Clemens transferred into the Commonwealth Public Service.

In June 1928, Clemens was appointed Secretary of the Department of Home and Territories, and later that year Secretary of the Department of Home Affairs.

In 1929, Clemens was appointed third commissioner of the Public Service Board. In 1931, he was appointed sole Public Service Commissioner after the retirement of W.J. Skewes as Chairman of the Public Service Board. In 1937, Clemens retired from the public service.

In 1938, the Australian Government appointed Clemens to conduct an inquiry into the high cost of living in Canberra. As part of the inquiry, Clemens was tasked with investigating why the costs of meat, vegetables, milk, groceries and other food in Canberra was much higher than in other nearby cities. While the inquiry was not a Royal Commission, Clemens was still granted the powers to call witnesses, take evidence under oath, and demand the production of books and documents. His report, delivered in March 1939, in six sections, recommended administrative action against monopolies controlling supply in the ACT.

Clemens died in Melbourne on 4 September 1941, following an operation.

== Awards and honours ==
Clemens was appointed a Companion of the Imperial Service Order in June 1925 whilst Secretary of the Public Service Board. In June 1934, he was made a Companion of the Order of St Michael and St George for his services as Commissioner of the Commonwealth Service Board. In 1937 he was made a Knight Bachelor.

In November 2004, a street in Canberra's central business district was named William Clemens Street in Clemens' honour.

Government offices
Preceded by John McLaren	Secretary of the Department of Home and Territories; 1928	Succeeded by Himself as Secretary of the Department of Home Affairs
Preceded by Himself as Secretary of the Department of Home and Territories	Secretary of the Department of Home Affairs; 1928	Succeeded by Percy Deane
Preceded by John McLaren	Public Service Commissioner; 1929–1937; With: W.J. Skewes 1929–1931; John Patrick McGlinn 1923–1930	Succeeded by Frank Thorpe
