= Walter Bingle =

Australian public servant (1861–1928)

Walter Bingle ISO

Secretary of the Department of Works and Railways
- In office 28 September 1917 – 11 April 1926

Personal details
- Born: Walter David Bingle; 12 April 1861 Newcastle, New South Wales
- Died: 7 August 1928 (aged 67) Brighton, Melbourne, Victoria
- Resting place: Brighton Cemetery
- Occupation: Public servant

Walter David Bingle ISO (12 April 1861 – 7 August 1928) was a senior Australian public servant, best known for his time as head of the Department of Works and Railways.

== Life and career ==
Bingle was born in Newcastle, New South Wales on 12 April 1861. For schooling he attended Newcastle Grammar School, before starting work in his father's shipping agency.

At Federation, Bingle joined the Commonwealth Public Service as a chief clerk in the Department of Home Affairs. Between 1917 and 1926, Bingle was Secretary of the Department of Works and Railways.

== Death ==
Bingle died on 7 August 1928 in Brighton, Melbourne, and was buried in Brighton cemetery.

== Awards ==
Bingle was made a Companion of the Imperial Service Order for his services as Secretary of the Commonwealth Works Department in June 1923.

Government offices
Preceded by David Miller	Secretary of the Department of Works and Railways; 1917 – 1926	Succeeded by Henry Walters
