= Halligan =

Halligan can refer to:

- Halligan (surname)
- Halligan bar, a tool used by firefighters
- USS Halligan (DD-584), a US Navy destroyer

== See also ==
- Senator Halligan (disambiguation)
