= Percival Gourgaud =

Australian public servant (1881–1958)

Percival Gourgaud OBE

Secretary of the Department of Works and Railways
- In office 11 June 1929 – 12 April 1932

Personal details
- Born: Percival Albert Gourgaud; 3 October 1881 Gladstone, Queensland, Australia
- Died: 30 August 1958 (aged 76) Canberra, Australian Capital Territory, Australia
- Occupation: Public servant

Percival Albert Gourgaud OBE (3 October 1881 – 30 August 1958) was a senior Australian public servant, best known for his time as head of the Department of Works and Railways.

== Life and career ==
Gourgaud was born on 3 October 1881 at Norton Diggings, near Gladstone, Queensland to parents Claudius Gourgaud and Mary Jane Gourgaud (née Barnes). Claudius had emigrated from France, and Mary Jane from England.

He was appointed Secretary of the Department of Works and Railways in June 1929, his previous position had been chief clerk and assistant secretary in the Department.

The Great Depression restricted public operations, and in 1932 the Works Department was amalgamated with Home Affairs and Transport to form the Department of the Interior, in which he was appointed Assistant Secretary.

Gourgaud retired in 1946, and moved to a house in Moore Street, Turner.

Gourgaud died on 30 August 1958 at Canberra Community Hospital, and was buried in Canberra cemetery.

== Awards ==
Gourgaud was appointed an Officer of the Order of the British Empire in 1937, in recognition of his public service.

Government offices
Preceded by Henry Walters	Secretary of the Department of Works and Railways; 1929 – 1932	Succeeded by Herbert Charles Brown as Secretary of the Department of the Interior
