= John Patrick McGlinn =

Australian general

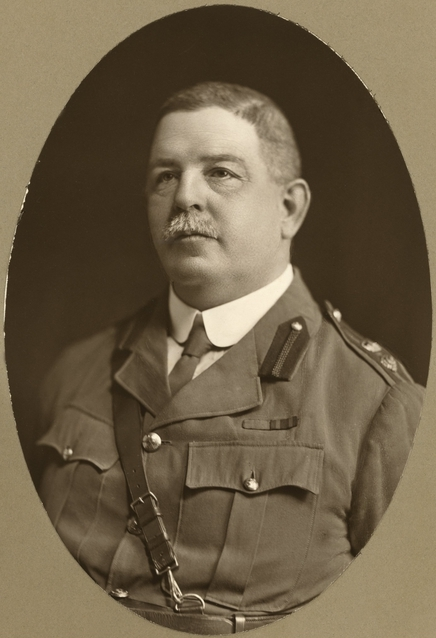
- Lieutenant Colonel John McGlinn c. 1916–17
- Born: 11 April 1869; Sydney, New South Wales
- Died: 7 July 1946 (aged 77); Melbourne, Victoria
- Burial place: St Kilda Cemetery
- Military career
- Allegiance: Australia
- Branch: Australian Army
- Service years: 1893–1920
- Rank: Brigadier general
- Commands: No. 2 AIF Depot (1917–18); No. 4 AIF Depot (1917)
- Conflicts: Second Boer War; First World War; Gallipoli Campaign; Western Front
- Awards: Companion of the Order of St Michael and St George; Commander of the Order of the British Empire; Colonial Auxiliary Forces Officers' Decoration; Mentioned in Despatches (3)

Brigadier General John Patrick McGlinn, CMG, CBE, VD (11 April 1869 – 7 July 1946) was an Australian public servant and a senior officer of the Australian Army during the First World War.

== Early life and career ==
John Patrick McGlinn was born on 11 April 1869 in Sydney, New South Wales. He was educated at St John's School, Maitland. He became a telegrapher with the New South Wales Postmaster-General's Department on 29 January 1883 and worked throughout the state.

McGlinn was commissioned as a second lieutenant in the New South Wales Military forces on 27 November 1893. He was promoted to lieutenant in 1898. He volunteered for service in South Africa with the 1st New South Wales Mounted Rifles during the Second Boer War. Arriving in Cape Town in February 1900, he served all over South Africa. He returned to Australia in March 1901.

With Federation in 1901, McGlinn was transferred to the new Commonwealth Postmaster-General's Department, working in Maitland as a telephone linesman. McGlinn was promoted to captain in 1905, major in 1906, becoming brigade major of the 1st Infantry Brigade, and lieutenant colonel on 23 December 1911.

== First World War ==
In September 1914, Colonel John Monash of the 4th Brigade chose McGlinn for his brigade major. Monash thus became the only brigadier general without a regular army brigade major, although Monash secured a regular, Captain Carl Jess, as staff captain. McGlinn joined the Australian Imperial Force on 23 September. While training in Egypt with the 4th Brigade, Monash and McGlinn became close.

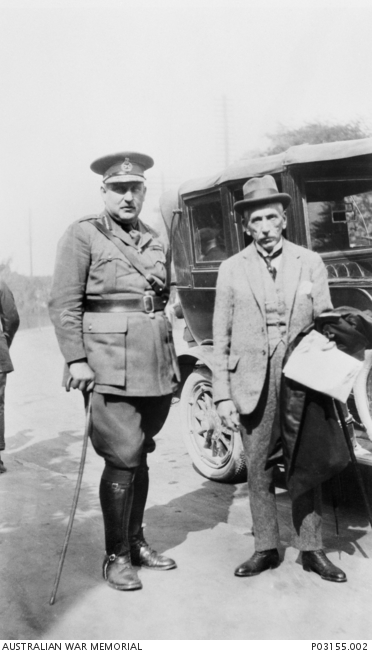
Prime Minister Billy Hughes and Brigadier General McGlinn, pictured here presumably between 1916 and 1918.

The 4th Brigade landed at Anzac Cove on the evening of 25 April 1915. The brigade took over the critical left centre of the line. McGlinn worked hard to improve the quality of the brigade's defences, and the rule of thumb became that a trench had to be wide enough for McGlinn to walk down without touching the sides. McGlinn was acting commander of the 4th Brigade on Imbros from 17 October to 8 November, while Monash was in Egypt. For his services at Gallipoli, McGlinn was twice mentioned in despatches and was appointed a Companion of the Order of St Michael and St George (CMG).

On 12 March 1916, McGlinn became assistant adjutant and quartermaster general of the newly formed 5th Division, under Major General James Whiteside McCay, and moved to Armentières, France, in June. He performed this task until he was evacuated sick on 9 November 1916. He was replaced by Lieutenant Colonel Julius Bruche and did not return to the 5th Division. Later in November he was again mentioned in despatches.

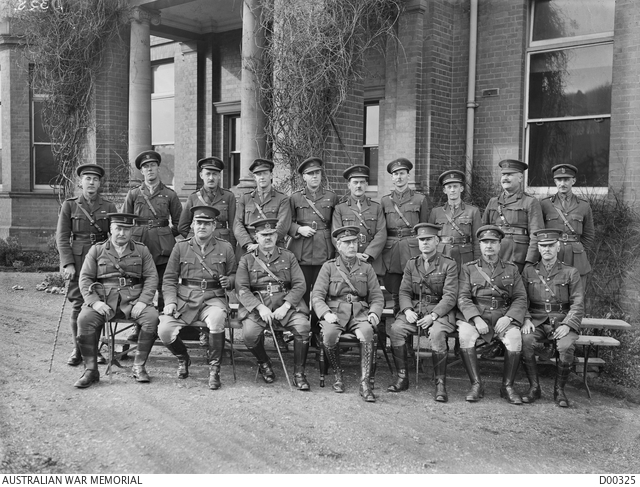
Group portrait of administrative officers attached to Headquarters AIF Depots in United Kingdom at Bhurtpore Barracks, March 1919. Brigadier General McGlinn is sat, third on the left, in the front row, next to Lieutenant General McCay.

In April 1917, McGlinn was appointed commander of No. 4 AIF Depot at Codford in England, again under McCay. Then, on 24 October 1917, he took command of No. 2 AIF Depot at Weymouth. In this role he responsible for the processing of "casual reinforcements"; wounded men who had recovered and were being returned to their units. He was promoted to colonel in December 1917.

On 17 March 1918, McGlinn was promoted to temporary brigadier general and appointed Deputy Adjutant and Quartermaster General of all AIF Depots in the United Kingdom. For this work, he was appointed a Commander of the Order of the British Empire (CBE) in the 1919 New Year Honours. On 31 August 1919, he became liaison officer in England for the Department of Repatriation.

== Post-war ==
On 11 November 1919, McGlinn was attached to AIF Headquarters as president of the courts-martial which tried Father O'Donnell, the Australian Catholic Chaplain. On 14 October 1919, O'Donnell was arrested in Ireland for traitorous and disloyal statements concerning British policy in Ireland, allegedly uttered at the International Hotel, Killarney. He also stated that Britain would have lost the war if not for the AIF. He was tried by McGlinn's court martial on 26–27 November 1919 and acquitted, although not honourably.

McGlinn returned to Australia in March 1920, and was placed on the unattached list as a brigadier general in July.

Returning to the PMG, McGlinn became deputy state engineer (lines) for New South Wales. He was appointed a commissioner of the Public Service Board in 1923, and served until 1930. He was chairman of the Commonwealth (AIF) Canteens Trust Fund. In 1935–1942 he was a member of the State War Council of Victoria. He died on 7 July 1946 and was buried at St Kilda Cemetery with full military honours. He was survived by his wife, two sons and a daughter.

== See also ==
- List of Australian generals

Government offices
New title Public Service Board first constituted	Public Service Commissioner; 1923–1930; With: W.J. Skewes 1923–1931; Brudenell White 1923–1928; John McLaren 1928; William Clemens 1929–1937	No successor appointed
