= Finlay Crisp =

Australian academic and political scientist (1917–1984)

Secretary of the Department of Post-War Reconstruction
- In office 25 August 1949 – 16 March 1950

Personal details
- Born: Leslie Finlay Crisp; 19 January 1917 Sandringham, Victoria
- Died: 21 December 1984 (aged 67) Canberra, Australian Capital Territory, Australia
- Spouse: Helen Crisp (née Wighton)
- Education: University of Adelaide; Balliol College, Oxford
- Occupation: Academic, political scientist and public servant

Leslie Finlay Crisp (19 January 1917 – 21 December 1984) was an Australian academic and political scientist.

The son of Leslie Walter Crisp (1884–1965), and Ruby Elizabeth Crisp (1896–1951), née Duff, Leslie Finlay Crisp was born in Sandringham, Victoria on 19 January 1917. He married Helen Craven Wighton (1916–2002), whom he had met at university in Adelaide, on 22 June 1940 in Oxford, England. He suffered a heart attack on 19 December 1984, and died in Canberra on 21 December 1984.

Educated at Black Rock State School, Caulfield Grammar School and St Peter's College, Adelaide, where he graduated in 1934, Crisp earned a Bachelor of Arts in political science and history from the University of Adelaide. While at university, he and his, later, wife Helen (then Helen Wighton) formed the National Union of Australian University Students.

In 1938, he was awarded a Rhodes Scholarship and went on to study at Balliol College in Oxford University, although his studies were disrupted while he worked for the Australian Public Service during World War II. In 1945, he was a member of the Australian Delegation to form the United Nations. He earned Bachelor of Arts and Master of Arts degrees from Oxford in 1948.

His work included positions with the Short-wave Broadcasting Service (later Radio Australia) and the Department of Labour & National Service, and he became head of the Department of Post-War Reconstruction in 1949.

In 1949, Crisp published his MA thesis from the University of Adelaide as The Parliamentary Government of the Commonwealth of Australia. Widely prescribed as a politics textbook, it was expanded and renamed Australian National Government in 1965. From 1950, he was a professor of political science at the Canberra University College and then at the Australian National University in Canberra, serving as head of the department from 1950 to 1970. Although increasingly disillusioned with changes in Australian universities, he continued teaching until retirement in 1977. He was appointed a director of the Commonwealth Bank in 1974, and served as chairman of the board from 1975 to 1984.

In 2005, Crisp and his wife were two of the first 17 inductees in the Australian Capital Territory Honour Walk, recognising their contribution to the development of Canberra.

Crisp Circuit in the Canberra suburb of Bruce was dedicated in his name.

== References and further reading ==
- Bennett, Scott, "Crisp, Leslie Finlay (Fin) (1917–1984)", Australian Dictionary of Biography, Australian National University, archived from the original on 2 May 2013
- MS 5243: Papers of Leslie Finlay Crisp, National Library of Australia, archived from the original on 14 March 2012

Government offices
Preceded by Allen Brown	Secretary of the Department of Post-War Reconstruction; 1949 – 1950	Department abolished
Business positions
Preceded by Roland Wilson	Chairman of the Commonwealth Bank; 1975 – 1984	Succeeded by Brian Massy-Greene
