= Department of Home Affairs (1928–1932) =

Australian government department, 1928–1932

Department overview
- Formed: 10 December 1928
- Preceding Department: Department of Home and Territories
- Dissolved: 12 April 1932
- Superseding Department: Department of the Interior (I)
- Jurisdiction: Commonwealth of Australia
- Headquarters: Canberra
- Ministers responsible: Aubrey Abbott, Minister (1928–1929); Arthur Blakeley, Minister (1929–1932); Archdale Parkhill, Minister (1932)
- Department executives: William Clemens, Secretary (1928); Percy Deane, Secretary (1929–1932)

The Department of Home Affairs was an Australian government department that existed between 1928 and 1932. It was the second so-named Australian government department.

== Scope ==
Information about the department's functions and government funding allocation could be found in the Administrative Arrangements Orders, the annual Portfolio Budget Statements and in the department's annual reports.

At its creation, the department dealt with:

- Actuarial matters
- Aliens' registration (new matter, as the Aliens' Registration Act 1920 had not appeared before its suspension by Act of 1926)
- Astronomy
- Australian War Memorial
- Census and Statistics
- Commonwealth Literary Fund
- Elections
- Emigration from Australia of children and aboriginal natives
- Forestry
- Franchise
- Immigration restrictions
- Indentured coloured labour
- Meteorology
- Naturalisation
- North Australia and Central Australia
- Northern Territory
- Oil investigation
- Oil prospecting (encouragement of)
- Passports
- Pearl shelling and Trepang fisheries in Australian waters beyond territorial limits
- People of races (other than the Aboriginal races in any State) for whom it is deemed necessary to make special laws
- Prisoners from territories
- Prospecting for precious metals (assistance for)
- Seat of Government
- Solar Observatory.

== Structure ==
The department was a Commonwealth Public Service department, staffed by officials who were responsible to the Minister for Home Affairs.
