= Brudenell White =

Australian general (1876–1940)

Sir Brudenell White
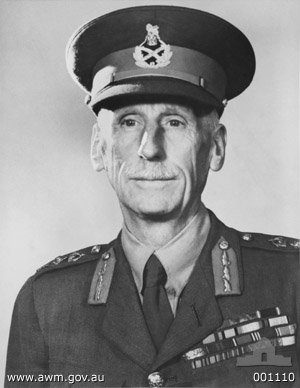
- General Sir Brudenell White in March 1940
- Born: 23 September 1876; St Arnaud, Victoria
- Died: 13 August 1940 (aged 63); Canberra, Australian Capital Territory
- Military career
- Allegiance: Australia
- Branch: Australian Army
- Service years: 1896–1923; 1940
- Rank: General
- Commands: Chief of the General Staff
- Conflicts: Second Boer War; First World War; Gallipoli Campaign; Landing at Anzac Cove; Western Front; Battle of the Somme; Battle of Pozières; Second World War
- Awards: Knight Commander of the Order of the Bath; Knight Commander of the Order of St Michael and St George; Knight Commander of the Royal Victorian Order; Distinguished Service Order; Mentioned in Despatches (8); Medal for Merit (Montenegro); Croix de Guerre (Belgium); Grand Officer of the Military Order of Aviz (Portugal); Croix de Guerre (France); Order of the Rising Sun, 2nd Class (Japan)
- Other work: Chairman of the Public Service Board

General Sir Cyril Brudenell Bingham White, KCB, KCMG, KCVO, DSO (23 September 1876 – 13 August 1940), more commonly known as Sir Brudenell White or C. B. B. White, was a senior officer in the Australian Army who served as Chief of the General Staff from 1920 to 1923 and again from March to August 1940, when he was killed in the Canberra air disaster.

== Early life and career ==
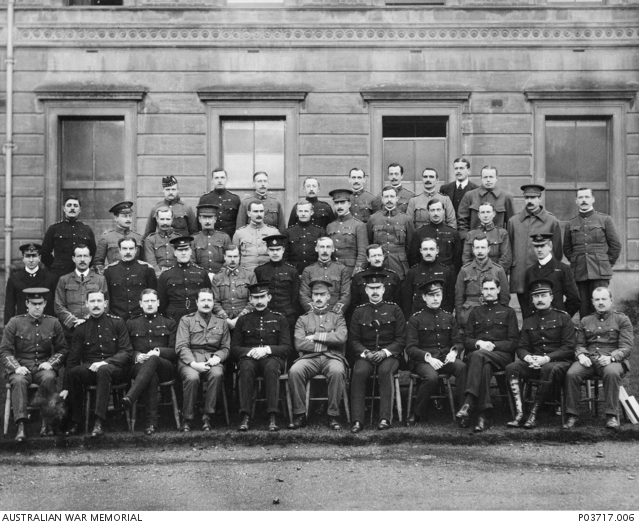
Group portrait of officers at the Staff College at Camberley in 1906. White, then a lieutenant, is in the back row, third from the left.

White was born in St Arnaud, Victoria, on 23 September 1876. He joined the colonial militia force in Queensland in 1896, and served in the Second Boer War with the Australian Commonwealth Horse. In 1901 he became a founding member of the new Australian Army, and in 1906 was the first Australian officer to attend the British staff college. In 1912 he returned to Australia and became Director of Military Operations, at a time when Andrew Fisher's Labor government was expanding Australia's defence capacity.

== First World War ==
When the First World War broke out in August 1914, White supervised the first contingents of the Australian Imperial Force (AIF) to go the front. During the Gallipoli campaign, he was chief of staff to Major General Sir William Bridges and then to Major General William Birdwood, gaining the rank of brigadier general in October. He was awarded the Distinguished Service Order (DSO) for his actions during the opening phase of the campaign. The citation for the medal, appearing in The Edinburgh Gazette in July 1915, reads as follows:

During the operations near Gaba Tepe on 25th April 1915, and subsequently for his distinguished service in co-ordinating staff work, and in reorganisation after the inevitable dislocation and confusion arising from the first landing operations. He displayed exceptional ability.

After the early 1916 evacuation from Gallipoli which he masterminded as "The Silence Ruse", he was Brigadier General, General Staff (BGGS) of I ANZAC Corps in France, arriving there late in March. In the battle for the Pozières Heights in late July 1916 which ended in failure, the commander of the British Expeditionary Force (BEF) on the Western Front, General Sir Douglas Haig, found fault with Birdwood and White.

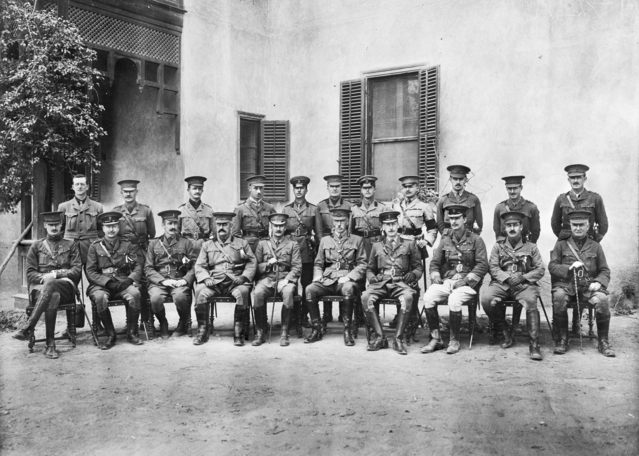
Group portrait of 1st Division staff officers at Mena Camp, December 1914. White, then a lieutenant colonel, is in the front row, fourth from the left.

White was promoted to the temporary rank of major general in January 1917.

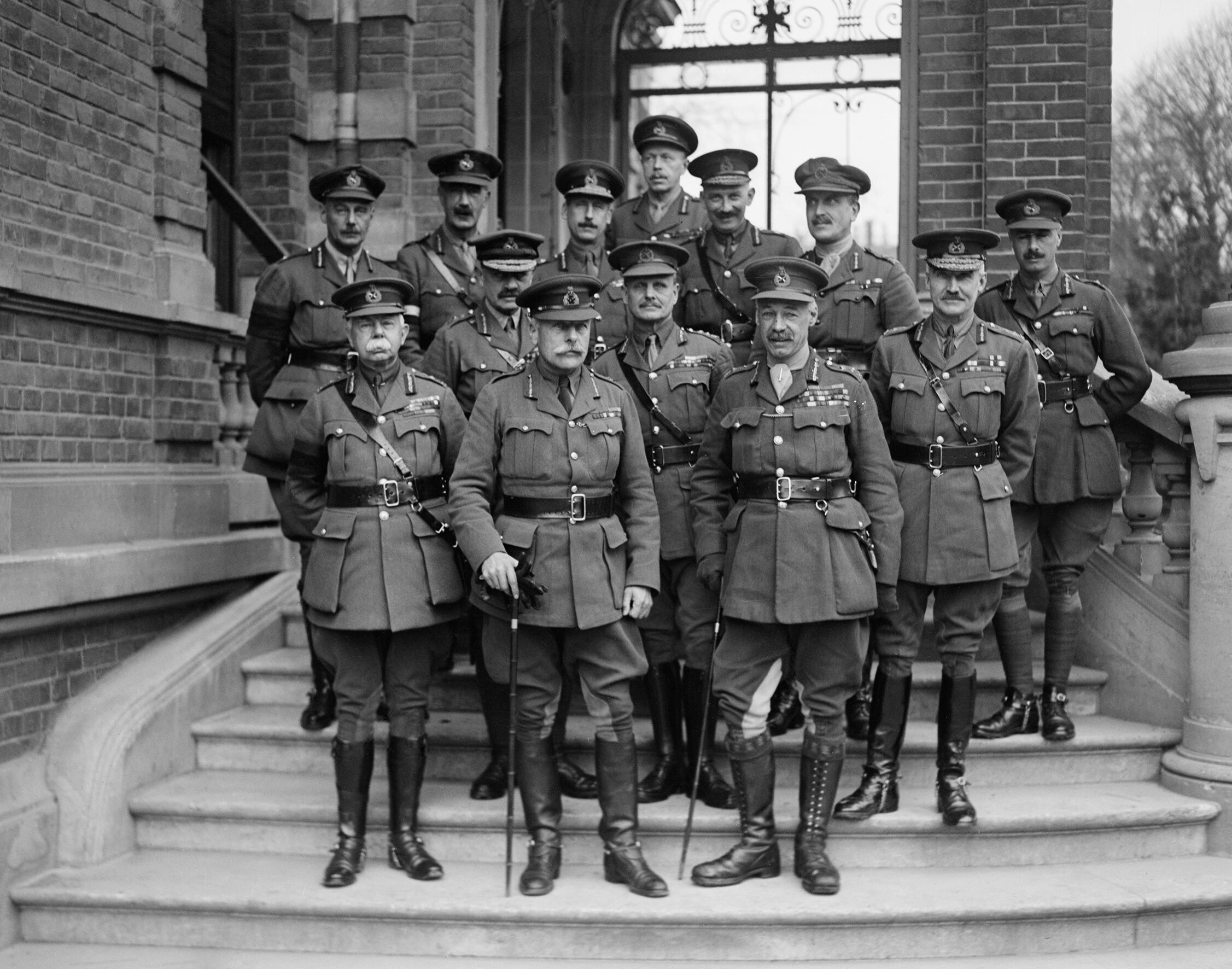
Field Marshal Sir Douglas Haig with his army commanders and their chiefs of staff, November 1918. Major General White is third from left in the back row.

== Between the wars ==
After the war White was appointed Chief of the General Staff from 1920 until his retirement in 1923. In the same year he was appointed chairman of the newly constituted Commonwealth Public Service Board, supervising the transfer of departments from Melbourne to the new capital, Canberra. In 1928 he chose not to move to Canberra, declining a further term with the Public Service Board in order to remain close to his home and grazing property "Woodnaggerak" near Buangor, Victoria.

== Second World War and death ==
In 1940, as Australia mobilised the Second Australian Imperial Force to take part in the Second World War, White, although doubting himself and believing himself to be "out of date", was nevertheless recalled to service at the age of 63, promoted to general, and re-appointed Chief of the General Staff, after his predecessor, Lieutenant General Ernest Squires, had died in office. Among his first acts in his new position was to recommend Lieutenant General Thomas Blamey to command the Second AIF. In April he urged for Blamey and the 7th Division to join the 6th Division, which was already overseas. In the next few weeks, while the Battle of France was well underway, he recommended that the Second AIF be sent to assist the Allies on the Western Front.

The length of White's appointment was destined to be short-lived, as the new CGS was aboard the Royal Australian Air Force (RAAF) plane that crashed in the Canberra air disaster on 13 August 1940, killing all aboard, which included three Federal ministers.

White was highly regarded by many of his generation, with Monash in particular describing him as "far and away the ablest soldier Australia had ever turned out".

== Notes ==
Military offices
Preceded by Lieutenant General Ernest Squires	Chief of the General Staff; March – August 1940	Succeeded by Major General John Northcott
Preceded by Major General James Gordon Legge	Chief of the General Staff; 1920–1923	Succeeded by General Sir Harry Chauvel
Government offices
New title Public Service Board first constituted	Public Service Commissioner; 1923–1928; With: W.J. Skewes 1923–1931; John Patrick McGlinn 1923–1930	Succeeded by John McLaren
