= Atlee Hunt =

Australian public servant

Atlee Hunt CMG
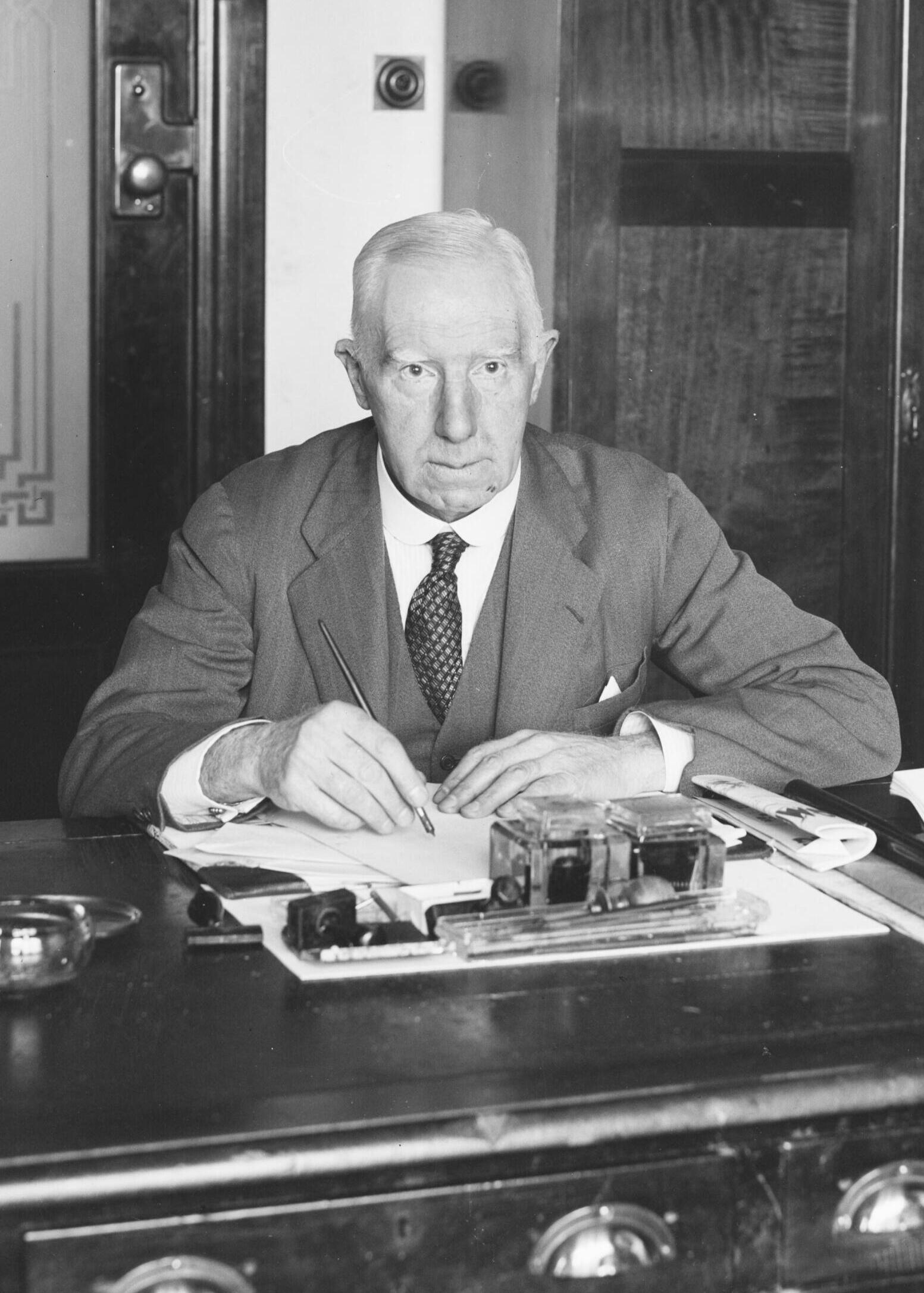
- Hunt c. 1928

Secretary of the Department of Home and Territories (Note: What was called the Department of External Affairs was changed to the Department of Home and Territories, which Hunt remained as its head.)
- In office 14 November 1916 – 17 March 1921
- Preceded by: Position established
- Succeeded by: John McLaren

Secretary of the Department of External Affairs
- In office 1 May 1901 – 13 November 1916
- Preceded by: Position established
- Succeeded by: Position abolished

Personal details
- Born: Atlee Arthur Hunt; 7 November 1864 Fitzroy River, Colony of Queensland
- Died: 19 September 1935 (aged 70) Claremont, Western Australia, Australia
- Resting place: Karrakatta Cemetery
- Citizenship: British
- Children: 3

Hunt by David Low

Atlee Arthur Hunt CMG (7 November 1864 – 19 September 1935) was a senior official in the Australian Public Service. He was appointed Secretary of the Department of External Affairs in 1901, the year of Australia's Federation.

== Life and career ==
Atlee Hunt was born in Fitzroy River, Queensland on 7 November 1864. He was educated at Balmain Public School and Sydney Grammar School. With alcoholic parents, he from an early age assumed effective responsibility for the household.

Hunt began his career at the New South Wales Lands Department in 1879. To study for the Bar, Hunt resigned from the department in 1887. He was admitted to the Bar in 1892 and practiced until late 1900. It was at this time that he forged a rewarding bond with Edmund Barton. An early fruit was his role as assistant counsel in the Proudfoot case, arbitrated by Edmund Barton, in which Hunt obtained a remarkable 2 815 pounds in fees, three times the annual salary of the most senior minister in the New South Wales government. A more political consequence of Barton's patronage was Hunt's appointment as chief organiser of the "United Federal Executive", which conducted the Yes campaign in the 1899 Federation referendum in New South Wales, on behalf of Barton's protectionists and Reid's free traders.

In 1901, Hunt was appointed Secretary of the Department of External Affairs, with Barton as his minister. Hunt's diary entries concerned with Barton as Minister for External Affairs are loyal but far from reverential.

During Barton's Prime Ministership Hunt assumed the testing task of implementing the often draconian provisions of the Immigration Restriction Act, the legal vehicle of the White Australia policy. In 1903, when SS Petriana grounded on rocks at Portsea Back Beach, he, against all traditions of seafaring, warned its Chinese seamen that if they abandoned their wrecked craft and landed on Australian soil, they risked a 100-pound fine. He organised a networks of informants to help enforce the Act.

Closely associated with Barton, and later Deakin, Hunt's star dipped as Labor's rose, but he was nevertheless assigned to prepare the Norfolk Island Act 1913, which removed from her inhabitants their last portions of self-rule.

Hunt died in Perth on 16 September 1935.

== Awards ==
In June 1910 Hunt was appointed a Companions of the Order of St Michael and St George.

== Notes ==
Government offices
New title Department established	Secretary of the Department of External Affairs; 1901–1916	Succeeded by Himself as Secretary of the Department of Home and Territories
Preceded by Himself as Secretary of the Department of External Affairs	Secretary of the Department of Home and Territories; 1916–1921	Succeeded by John McLaren
Preceded by David Miller as Secretary of the Department of Home Affairs	Secretary of the Department of Home and Territories; 1916–1921	Succeeded by John McLaren
