= Percy Deane =

Australian public servant

Percy Deane CMG

Secretary of the Prime Minister's Department
- In office 11 February 1921 – 31 December 1928

Secretary of the Department of Home Affairs
- In office 1 January 1929 – 12 April 1932

Personal details
- Born: Percival Edgar Deane; 10 August 1890 Port Melbourne, Victoria
- Died: 17 August 1946 (aged 56) Caulfield, Victoria
- Spouse: Ruth Marjorie Manning (m. 1917)
- Children: 1 daughter
- Occupation: Public servant

Percival Edgar Deane CMG (10 August 1890–17 August 1946) was an Australian public servant.

Deane was born in Port Melbourne, the son of a carpenter. He won a scholarship to University High School, Melbourne, and then worked as a typewriter salesman, shorthand writer, and clerk at the University of Melbourne, before going into business, becoming part-owner of two companies, and founding and editing Australian Golfer (being an outstanding golfer himself).

On the outbreak of the First World War in 1914 he enlisted in the Australian Imperial Force and was posted to the 1st Australian General Hospital in Egypt, where he was commissioned Lieutenant and Quartermaster. In April 1916 he was invalided back to Australia suffering from overstrain.

In November 1916 Deane was appointed private secretary to Prime Minister Billy Hughes. He was secretary to the Australian delegation to the Versailles Conference, for which he was appointed Companion of the Order of St Michael and St George (CMG) in the 1920 New Year Honours, and to the Australian delegations to the Imperial Conferences of 1921 and 1926. His relationship with Hughes was dramatised in the 1974 ABC docudrama Billy and Percy, which won "Best Dramatised Documentary" at the 1975 Logies and the "Golden Reel" prize at the 1974–75 Australian Film Institute Awards.

In February 1921 he was appointed Secretary of the Prime Minister's Department and in 1929 Secretary of the Department of Home Affairs until its abolition in 1932. From 1932 until his retirement on medical grounds (with myocarditis) in 1936, he was a member of the War Pensions Entitlement Appeals Tribunal.

In his retirement, Deane broke his hip in a street-fall and became bedridden, eventually dying of cancer on 17 August 1946 at the age of 56.

== References and further reading ==
- Murray-Smith, S. (1981), "Deane, Percival Edgar (Percy) (1890–1946)", Australian Dictionary of Biography, Australian National University, archived from the original on 4 November 2013
- "Death of Mr Percy E. Deane". The Argus. 19 August 1946. p. 4.

Government offices
Preceded by Malcolm Shepherd	Secretary of the Prime Minister's Department; 1921 – 1928	Succeeded by John McLaren
Preceded by William Clemens	Secretary of the Department of Home Affairs; 1929 – 1932	Succeeded by Herbert Charles Brown as Secretary of the Department of the Interior
