= Department of External Affairs (1901–1916) =

Australian government department, 1901–1916

Department overview
- Formed: 1 January 1901
- Dissolved: 14 November 1916
- Superseding Department: Department of Home and Territories
- Jurisdiction: Commonwealth of Australia
- Department executive: Atlee Hunt, Secretary

The Department of External Affairs was an Australian government department that existed between January 1901 and November 1916. It was one of seven Departments of State to be established at federation.

== Scope ==
The first Administrative Arrangements Order, issued 1901, outlined the functions of the Department:

- Fisheries - extraterritorial
- Naturalisation and aliens
- Immigration and emigration
- Influx of criminals
- External affairs
- Pacific Islands
- High Commissioner
- Communications with States
- Governor-General and Executive Council offices
- Officers of Parliament

== History ==
The Department was a Commonwealth Public Service department, staffed by officials who were responsible to the Minister for External Affairs. The Prime Minister's Office was attached to the Department of External Affairs until 1909.

The departmental secretary throughout the department's existence was Atlee Hunt.

The department was abolished in 1916 by Prime Minister Billy Hughes as part of a reorganisation following the Australian Labor Party split of 1916, with its functions merged into the Prime Minister's Department.
