= David Miller (public servant) =

Colonel David Miller CMG ISO

Secretary of the Department of Home Affairs
- In office 19 November 1901 – 14 November 1916

Secretary of the Department of Works and Railways
- In office 14 November 1916 – 31 August 1917

Personal details
- Born: 27 March 1857 Glebe, Sydney, New South Wales
- Died: 27 November 1934 (aged 77) Glen Innes, New South Wales
- Spouse(s): Emily Eliza Langdon (m. 1878–1883; her death); Mary Elizabeth Thompson (m. 1890–1934; his death)
- Occupation: Public servant

David Miller CMG ISO (1857 – 1934) was a senior Australian Commonwealth public servant, appointed in the year of Federation to head the Department of Home Affairs.

== Life and career ==
David Miller was born in Glebe, Sydney on 27 March 1857.

He joined the NSW Public Service in 1875. His military career started ten years later when he was appointed a 2nd lieutenant in the New South Wales Militia.

In 1901, Miller was appointed Secretary of the Department of Home Affairs.

He was made Administrator of the Federal Capital Territory in 1912, occupying dual positions, and transferring to Canberra. His residency was the first permanent building in Canberra and he was responsible for conducting an international design competition for establishing the national capital. Miller was not a fan of the Walter Burley Griffin design selected for Canberra, believing it to be too expensive to be realised.

Miller retired officially from Canberra in his final position as Secretary of the Department of Works and Railways in August 1917. He died on 27 November 1934 at Glen Innes.

== Awards ==
Miller was awarded an Imperial Service Order in February 1904, as Secretary of the Home Affairs Department. In June 1913 he was appointed a Companions of the Order of St Michael and St George.

In 2009, a street in the Canberra suburb of Casey was named David Miller Crescent in Miller's honour.

Government offices
New title Department established	Secretary of the Department of Home Affairs; 1901 – 1916	Succeeded by Himself as Secretary of the Department of Works and Railways
New title Department established	Secretary of the Department of Home Affairs; 1901 – 1916	Succeeded by Atlee Hunt as Secretary of the Department of Home and Territories
Preceded by Himself as Secretary of Home Affairs	Secretary of the Department of Works and Railways; 1916 – 1917	Succeeded by Walter Bingle
