= Andy Becker =

Australian public servant

Andrew Kingsley Becker is a former Australian Electoral Commissioner who served in that position between 2000-2005.

Becker commenced his career as a Returning Officer in South Australia in 1967. He was appointed as Deputy Commissioner, in 1997, before being appointed as Commissioner in 2000. His appointment generated a degree of controversy, with the opposition claiming that he had not been recommended for the position by the selection panel.

The opposition later claimed that Becker had behaved inappropriately by giving the Australian Taxation Office (ATO) access to the Australian Electoral Commission database, to allow the ATO to do a mailout to all electors. The Howard Government maintained that the Commissioner had done nothing wrong, and that such use of the electoral roll had occurred previously, however the Privacy Commissioner, Malcolm Crompton, found that Becker breached privacy laws by handing over voters' details to the ATO.
