= Department of Home and Territories =

Australian government department, 1916–1928

Department overview
- Formed: 14 November 1916
- Preceding Department: Department of External Affairs (I) Department of Home Affairs (I)
- Dissolved: 10 December 1928
- Superseding Department: Department of Home Affairs (II) Prime Minister's Department
- Jurisdiction: Commonwealth of Australia
- Headquarters: Melbourne
- Ministers responsible: Fred Bamford, Minister (1916–1917); Paddy Glynn, Minister (1917–1920); Alexander Poynton, Minister (1920–1921); George Pearce, Minister (1921–1926); Thomas William Glasgow, Minister (1926–1927); Charles Marr, Minister (1927–1928); Neville Howse, Minister (1928); Aubrey Abbott, Minister (1928)
- Department executives: Atlee Hunt, Secretary (1916–1921); John McLaren, Secretary (1921–1928); William Clemens, Secretary (1928)

The Department of Home and Territories was an Australian government department which existed between November 1916 and December 1928.

== Scope ==
Information about the department's functions and government funding allocation could be found in the Administrative Arrangements Orders, the annual Portfolio Budget Statements and in the Department's annual reports.

At its creation, the Department dealt with:

- Astronomy
- Census and statistics
- Elections
- Franchise
- Immigration and emigration
- Influx of criminals
- Lands and surveys
- Meteorology
- Naturalization and aliens
- Pearl shelling and trepang fisheries in Australian waters beyond territorial limits
- People of races (other than the Aboriginal races in any state) for whom it is deemed necessary to make special laws
- Seat of government
- Territories forming part of the Commonwealth

== Structure ==
The Department was an Australian Public Service department, staffed by officials who were responsible to the Minister for Home and Territories.
