= USS Halligan =

Fletcher-class destroyer

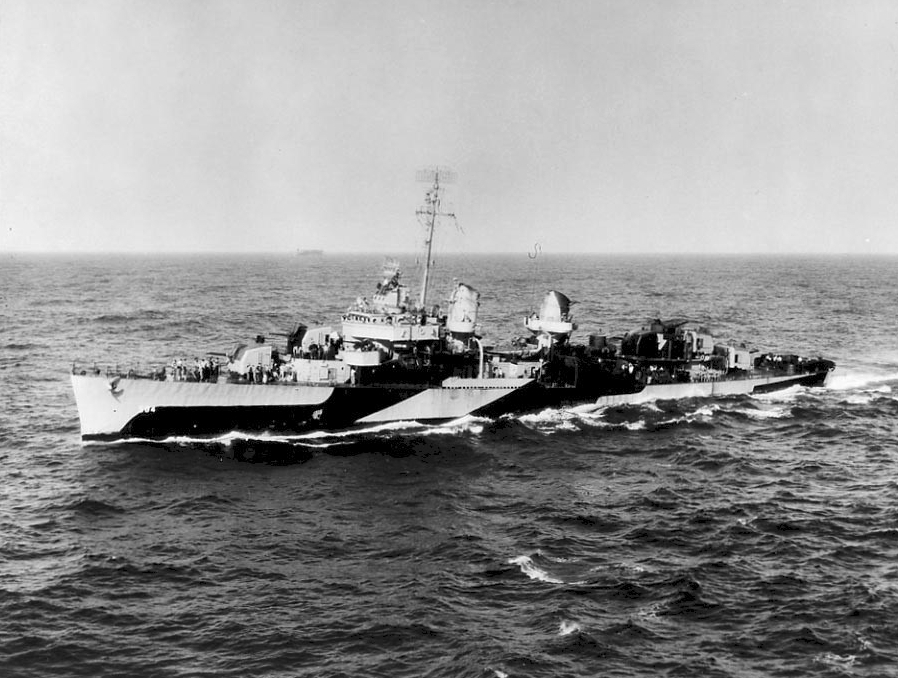
- USS Halligan (DD-584) underway in March 1945

History

United States
- Name: USS Halligan
- Namesake: John Halligan, Jr.
- Builder: Boston Navy Yard
- Laid down: 9 November 1942
- Launched: 19 March 1943
- Commissioned: 19 August 1943
- Stricken: 28 April 1945
- Fate: Lost to mine, 26 March 1945

General characteristics
- Class & type: Fletcher-class destroyer
- Displacement: 2,050 tons
- Length: 376 ft 6 in (114.7 m)
- Beam: 39 ft 8 in (12.1 m)
- Draft: 17 ft 9 in (5.4 m)
- Propulsion: 60,000 shp (45 MW); 2 propellers
- Speed: 35 knots (65 km/h; 40 mph)
- Range: 6500 nmi. (12,000 km) at 15 kt
- Complement: 273
- Armament: 5 × 5 in (130 mm), 4 × 40 mm AA guns, 4 × 20 mm AA guns, 10 × 21 inch (533 mm) torpedo tubes, 6 × depth charge projectors, 2 × depth charge tracks

USS Halligan (DD-584) was a Fletcher-class destroyer of the United States Navy, named for Rear Admiral John Halligan, Jr. (1876–1934).

Halligan was laid down 9 November 1942 by Boston Navy Yard, Boston, Massachusetts; launched 19 March 1943, sponsored by Mrs. John Halligan, widow of Admiral Halligan, and commissioned 19 August 1943.

== World War II ==
After shakedown off Bermuda Halligan in mid-November joined Iowa carrying President Franklin D. Roosevelt and his party en route to the historic Teheran Conference. She served as part of the escort screen to Casablanca, then for the next few weeks conducted anti-submarine operations off North Africa. She rejoined Iowa 11 December and steamed to the United States, arriving Charleston, South Carolina, 17 December.

=== 1944 ===
Assigned to duty in the Pacific, Halligan departed Charleston 21 December, reached San Diego, California, 4 January 1944, and arrived Pearl Harbor 11 January. As part of Task Force 52 (TF 52), she sailed 22 January for the invasion of the Marshall Islands. Between 31 January and 25 February she operated as a screen and patrol ship during the Kwajalein operations, and she screened and patrolled in the forward area until returning to Pearl Harbor 22 May.

Halligan next joined the screening group for escort carriers Natoma Bay and Manila Bay, carrying Army fighters for support of the Saipan operation. After launching planes 22 June, the task group was attacked the next day by Japanese dive bombers.

After a period at Pearl Harbor, Halligan departed 15 September for Eniwetok and Manus, Admiralties. Arriving Seeadler Harbor 3 October, she joined a task force forming for the invasion of the Philippines. Departing 14 October, she entered Leyte Gulf 20 October and was soon in the thick of the fighting as Japanese planes tried unsuccessfully to dislodge the landing forces. While guarding the transports, she survived almost continuous air attacks; at one point two bombs passed between her stacks and struck the water without exploding. On 25 October she shot down at least two attacking aircraft, one a two-engined bomber. Later that same day, she departed Leyte to screen the battered escort carriers of "Taffy 3", withdrawing from their courageous battle against Japanese forces off Samar. She joined the carriers 26 October and steamed to Manus, Admiralties, arriving 1 November. While at Manus, she supported rescue operations following the explosion of Mount Hood 10 November. Two days later she sailed for Leyte, and she finished the year screening for escort carriers between Leyte and the Admiralties.

== 1945 ==
Halligan's next assignment was supporting the invasion of Luzon at Lingayen Gulf. Operating as part of Admiral Jesse B. Oldendorf's powerful support forces, she departed the Palaus 1 January 1945, transited Surigao Strait 3 January, and steamed through the Sulu Sea bound for the western coast of Luzon. Penetrating deep into enemy-held territory, the fleet was subjected to extensive kamikaze attacks. Ommaney Bay was severely hit 4 January; and after her survivors were rescued, the burning carrier was sunk by torpedoes fired by Burns. The following day Japanese planes resumed their attacks; despite withering anti-aircraft fire which shot down most of the attackers, suicide planes damaged several ships during an afternoon attack. Halligan shot down one kamikaze 5 January, then sent rescue and repair parties to assist damaged Stafford.

Arriving off Lingayen Gulf 7 January, Halligan screened escort carriers and patrolled in search of enemy submarines during the important Lingayen landings 9 January. She remained off the Luzon coast until 17 January when she sailed for Leyte as part of the screen for six escort carriers. Arriving Leyte Gulf 22 January, she sailed for Ulithi the next day and arrived 25 January to prepare for the invasion of Iwo Jima.

Assigned duty as fire support and shore bombardment ship, Halligan departed Ulithi 10 February; and, after conducting simulated shore bombardment at Tinian, Marianas, she departed Saipan 12 February for Iwo Jima. On 17 February she served as lifeguard ship north of Iwo Jima during preinvasion air strikes. At dawn she sighted and took under fire a Japanese twin-engined bomber, which attacked the ship from the port bow. Hit repeatedly by accurate gunfire, the attacker dropped a large bomb which landed about 100 yards (91 m) off the port bow and failed to explode. Burning as it passed over the ship, the enemy plane crashed more than a mile away.

Halligan closed to within 2,700 yards (2.5 km) of the shore of Iwo Jima 19 February; and, as the first wave of Marines headed for the beach, she joined other ships in providing a heavy support barrage. Her guns destroyed a Japanese shore battery, and she spent much of D-Day pounding assigned target areas in support of the main landings. Later that day she joined other destroyers screening for escort carriers, and during the remainder of her duty off Iwo Jima she served as a screen and plane guard ship for offshore carrier operations.

One of the last destroyers to return from the Iwo Jima operation, Halligan arrived Ulithi in mid-March. She was soon underway again, this time as part of Task Force 54 (TF 54), steaming for the invasion of Okinawa—gateway to the heart of the Japanese Empire. Assigned to a fire support unit, she arrived off the southwestern part of Okinawa 25 March and began patrolling between Okinawa and Kerama Retto. In addition, she covered minesweepers during sweep operations through waters which had been heavily mined with irregular patterns.

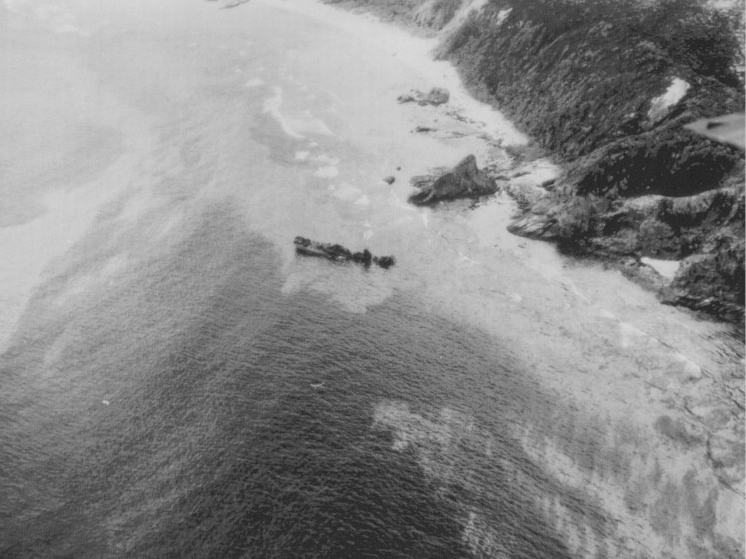
Halligan sunk off Tokashiki island.

Halligan continued her offshore patrols on 26 March. At about 18:35 a tremendous explosion rocked the ship, sending smoke and debris 200 feet (61 m) in the air. The destroyer had hit a moored mine head on, exploding the forward magazines and blowing off the forward section of the ship including the bridge, back to the forward stack. PC-1128 and USS LSM(R)-194 arrived soon after the explosion to aid survivors. Ensign Richard L. Gardner, the senior surviving officer who was uninjured, organized rescue parties and directed the evacuation of the living to waiting rescue vessels. Finally, he gave the order to abandon ship as the smoking hulk drifted helplessly.

USS PC-584 was one of the rescue vessels, saving approximately 80 men from the stricken destroyer. The commander of that vessel, Cecil N. Smith, was awarded the Silver Star for his role in the rescue effort.

Halligan lost half of her crew of 300 in the disaster, and only 2 of her 21 officers survived. The abandoned destroyer drifted aground on Tokashiki, a small island west of Okinawa, the following day. There the hulk was further battered by pounding surf and enemy shore batteries. Her name was struck from the Navy List 28 April 1945, and in 1957 her hulk was donated to the government of the Ryukyu Islands.

Halligan received six battle stars for World War II service.
