= List of commissioners of the Australian Public Service =

The Australian Public Service Commissioner is an official appointed by the Australian Government to take a leading role ensuring the Australian Public Service has adequate organisational and workforce capability. Until 1987 the Australian Public Service Commission was called the Public Service Board.

== List of commissioners ==
=== Inaugural Public Service Commissioner ===
- Duncan McLachlan (1902–1916)

=== Original appointments to the Public Service Board (1923) ===
- William Skewes (1923–1931)
- John Patrick McGlinn (1923–1930)
- Brudenell White (1923–1928)

=== Commissioners on the Public Service Board ===
- John McLaren (1928)
- William Clemens (1929–1931)

=== Sole Public Service Commissioners ===
- William Clemens (1931–1937)
- Frank Thorpe (1937–1947)

=== Chairmen of the Public Service Board ===
- William Dunk (1947–1960)
- Frederick Wheeler (1961–1971)
- Alan Cooley (1971–1977)
- Mick Shann (1977–1978
- William Cole (1978–1983)
- Peter Wilenski (1983–1987)

=== Australian Public Service Commissioners ===
- John Enfield (1987–1990)
- Dennis Ives (1990–1995)
- Peter Shergold (1995–1998)
- Helen Williams (1998–2002)
- Andrew Podger (2002–2004)
- Lynelle Briggs (2004–2009)
- Steve Sedgwick (2009–2014)
- John Lloyd (2014–2018)
- Peter Woolcott (2018–2023)
- Dr Gordon de Brouwer PSM (2023–2026)
- Dr Subho Banerjee (interim; 2026)
- Jacqui Curtis PSM (2026–)
