= Senator Halligan =

Senator Halligan may refer to:

- Brendan Halligan (1936–2020), Senate of Ireland
- Jim Halligan (1936–2022), Oklahoma State Senate
- Mike Halligan (born 1949), Montana State Senate

== See also ==
- Halligan (disambiguation)
