= John Halligan Jr. =

US Navy admiral

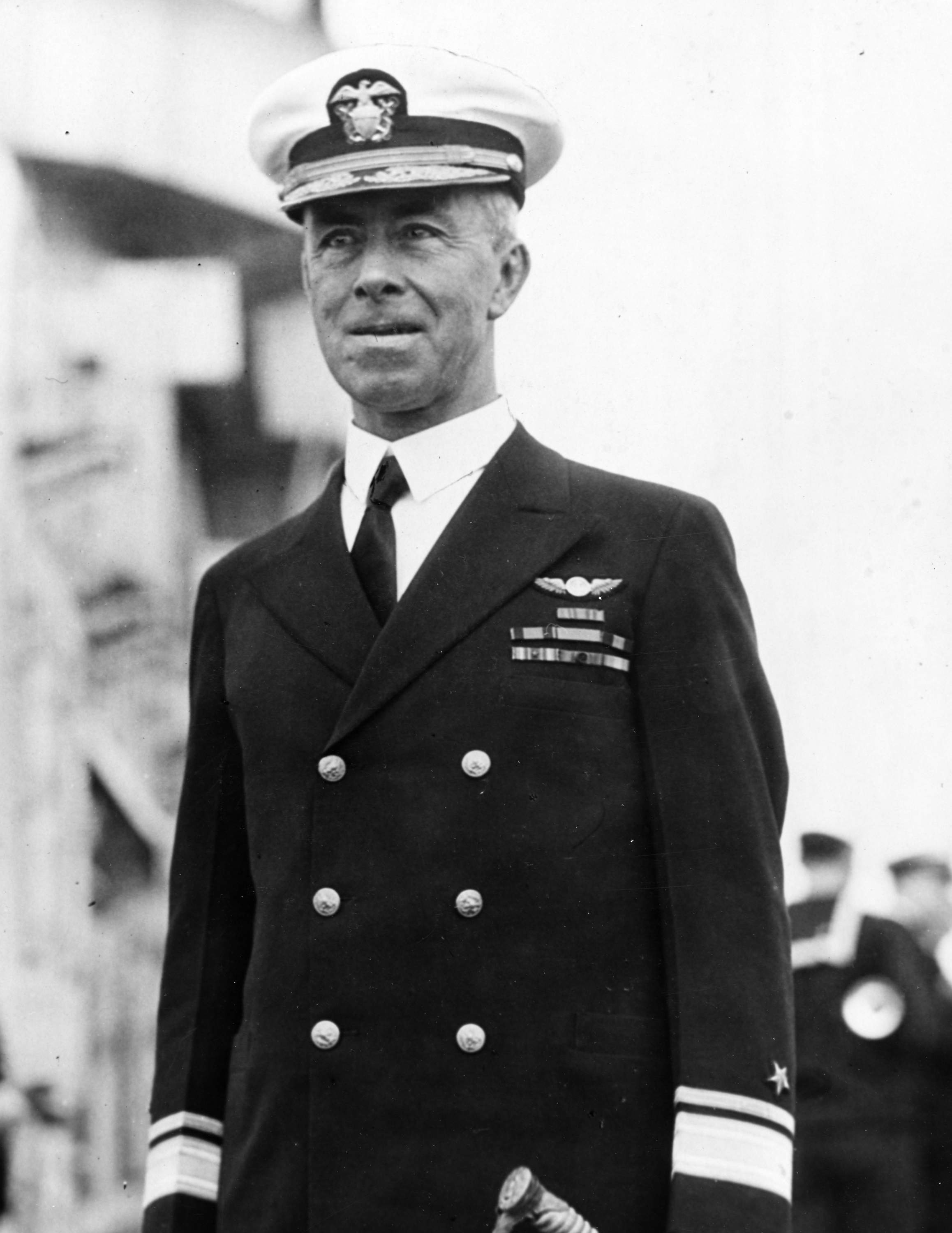
- Rear Admiral John Halligan Jr. c. 1934
- Born: 4 May 1876; South Boston, Massachusetts
- Died: 11 December 1934 (aged 58); Puget Sound, Washington
- Military career
- Allegiance: United States of America
- Branch: United States Navy
- Service years: 1898–1934
- Rank: Rear Admiral
- Commands: USS Ohio; USS Saratoga
- Conflicts: Spanish–American War; World War I
- Awards: Distinguished Service Medal

John Halligan Jr. (4 May 1876 – 11 December 1934) was an admiral of the United States Navy in the early 20th century.

== Biography ==
Halligan, born on 4 May 1876 in South Boston, Massachusetts, graduated from the United States Naval Academy at the head of his class in 1898. He served during the Spanish–American War in the armored cruiser USS Brooklyn, flagship of Commodore Winfield S. Schley. During World War I he was chief of staff to Vice Admiral Henry Braid Wilson Commander, U.S. Naval Forces, France, and for his outstanding performance of duty he received the Distinguished Service Medal.

After the Armistice, he commanded the battleship Ohio, and in 1925 became chief of the Bureau of Engineering with the temporary rank of rear admiral. After qualifying as a naval aviation observer, he commanded the aircraft carrier Saratoga from September 1928 to April 1929. He served as Assistant Chief of Naval Operations in 1930, and in 1933 became Commander Aircraft, Battle Force. Appointed Rear Admiral in 1930, Halligan died at Puget Sound, Washington, 11 December 1934, while serving as Commandant, 13th Naval District. He was interred at the United States Naval Academy Cemetery on 17 December 1934.

== Namesake ==
In 1943, the destroyer USS Halligan (DD-584) was named in his honor.
