= Department of Home Affairs (1901–1916) =

Australian government department, 1901–1916

Department overview
- Formed: 1 January 1901
- Dissolved: 14 November 1916
- Superseding Department: Department of Works and Railways – for public works, railways, rivers Department of Home and Territories – for all other functions
- Jurisdiction: Commonwealth of Australia
- Headquarters: Melbourne
- Ministers responsible: William Lyne, Minister (1901–1903); John Forrest, Minister (1903–1904); Lee Batchelor, Minister (1904); Dugald Thomson, Minister (1904–1905); Littleton Groom, Minister (1905–1906); Thomas Ewing, Minister (1906–1907); John Keating, Minister (1907–1908); Hugh Mahon, Minister (1908–1909)
- Department executive: David Miller, Secretary

The Department of Home Affairs was an Australian government department that existed between 1901 and 1916. It was one of seven inaugural government departments of Australia established at federation.

== Scope ==
Information about the department's functions and government funding allocation could be found in the Administrative Arrangements Orders, the annual Portfolio Budget Statements and in the Department's annual reports.

At its creation, the Department dealt with:

- Old-age pensions
- People of special races
- Acquisition of property
- Acquisition of railways with state consent
- Control of railways with state consent
- Astronomical
- Census and statistics
- Public works
- Federal capital
- Interstate commissions
- Elections
- Public service

== Structure ==
The Department was an Australian Public Service department, staffed by officials who were responsible to the Minister for Home Affairs.
