= Prime Minister's Department (Australia) =

Australian government department, 1911–1971

Department overview
- Formed: 1 July 1911
- Dissolved: 12 March 1971
- Superseding Department: Department of the Prime Minister and Cabinet
- Jurisdiction: Commonwealth of Australia
- Minister responsible: Prime Minister of Australia
- Department executives: Malcolm Shepherd, Secretary (1912–1921); Percy Deane, Secretary (1921–1928); John G. McLaren, Secretary (1929–1933); John Henry Starling, Secretary (1933–1935); Frank Strahan, Secretary (1935–1949); Allen S. Brown, Secretary (1949–1958); John Bunting, Secretary (1959–1968); Lenox Hewitt, Secretary (1968–1971)

The Prime Minister's Department was an Australian government department that existed between July 1911 and March 1971.

== History ==
The Prime Minister's Department was created in July 1911, initiated on a small scale compared to other government departments of the day. The department at its formation was placed under the charge of Malcolm Shepherd, who had been secretary to the Prime Minister for some years already. It had been speculated that the government would create such a department in media before its creation, including in May 1910.

In 1968, Prime Minister John Gorton split a section of the Prime Minister's Department off, to form the Department of the Cabinet Office with the responsibility to service the Cabinet and the committees of Cabinet.

By 1970, it had become apparent there was considerable unhappiness about the way the Prime Minister's Department was run. The following year, in March 1971, the department was abolished and its functions moved to the newly formed Department of the Prime Minister and Cabinet. The new department combined the functions of the Prime Minister's Department and the Department of the Cabinet Office. The Prime Minister of the day, William McMahon, told media that the former system with separate departments for Cabinet and for the Prime Minister, that had been operating since 1968, was inefficient.

== Scope ==
Information about the department's functions and government funding allocation could be found in the Administrative Arrangements Orders, the annual Portfolio Budget Statements and in the department's annual reports.

In 1912, the department's functions were outlined in an Administrative Arrangements Order as:

- Auditor-General and Staff
- Communication with the Governor-General
- Communication with the States
- Officers of the Parliament
- Public Service Commissioner and Staff (as from 1 July 1912)
- Royal Commissions
- The Commonwealth of Australia Gazette
- The Federal Executive Council

== Structure ==
The department was a Commonwealth Public Service department, staffed by officials who were responsible to the Prime Minister of Australia.
