= Australian Public Service =

Federal civil service of Australia

Agency overview
- Formed: 1 January 1901
- Headquarters: Canberra, Australia (36.91 per cent of staff)
- Employees: 198,529 (at June 2025)
- Agency executives: Jacqui Curtis PSM, Australian Public Service Commissioner; Steven Kennedy PSM, Secretary of the Department of the Prime Minister and Cabinet
- Key document: Public Service Act 1999

Minister for the Public Service
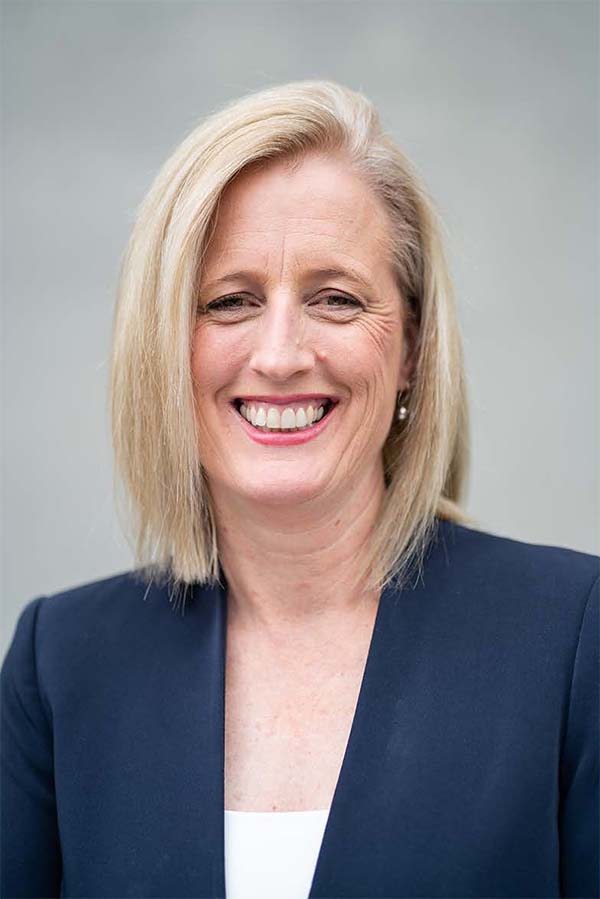
- Incumbent; Katy Gallagher since 1 June 2022
- Australian Public Service
- Style: The Honourable
- Appointer: Governor-General on the recommendation of the Prime Minister of Australia
- Inaugural holder: Mathias Cormann
- Formation: 28 August 2018

The Australian Public Service (APS) is the federal civil service of the Commonwealth of Australia responsible for the public administration, public policy, and public services of the departments and executive and statutory agencies of the Government of Australia. The Australian Public Service was established at the Federation of Australia in 1901 as the Commonwealth Public Service and modelled on the Westminster system and United Kingdom's Civil Service. The establishment and operation of the Australian Public Service is governed by the Public Service Act 1999 of the Parliament of Australia as an "apolitical public service that is efficient and effective in serving the Government, the Parliament and the Australian public". The conduct of Australian public servants is also governed by a Code of Conduct and guided by the APS Values set by the Australian Public Service Commission.

As such, the employees and officers of the Australian Public Service are obliged to serve the government of the day with integrity and provide "frank and fearless advice" on questions of public policy, from national security to fiscal policy to social security, across machinery of government arrangements. Indeed, the Australian Public Service plays a major part in Australian life by providing "cradle to grave" services with a degree of shared responsibility with the State and Territory governments. The Australian Public Service as an entity does not include the broader Commonwealth public sector including the Australian Defence Force, Commonwealth companies such as NBN Co or the Australian Rail Track Corporation, or Commonwealth corporate entities such as the Australian National University or the Australian Broadcasting Corporation. The Australian Public Service does not include the civil services of the State and Territory governments.

Public servants are ultimately responsible to the Parliament of Australia via their respective portfolio Minister. The Australian Public Service Commission is responsible for promoting the values of the public service, evaluating performance and compliance, and facilitating the development of people and institutional capabilities. The Secretary of the Department of the Prime Minister and Cabinet is the most senior public servant and plays a leadership role as the chair of the intergovernmental Secretaries Board made up of all Commonwealth departmental secretaries. The Australian National Audit Office, the Department of Finance, the Department of the Treasury, and the Attorney-General's Department also have whole-of-government oversight and management responsibilities.

As at June 2015, the Australian Public Service comprises some 152,430 officers alongside a further 90,000 people employed in the broader Commonwealth public sector. Accordingly, the Australian Public Service is one of the largest employers in Australia. As at December 2023 the APS comprises 170,000 people, of which 60.4 percent were female.

As of 2025, the Australian Public Service wage bill was estimated at 40.9 Bn.. This was 5.2% of the Australian Federal Budget for 2025 of $AUD 785 billion.

== History ==
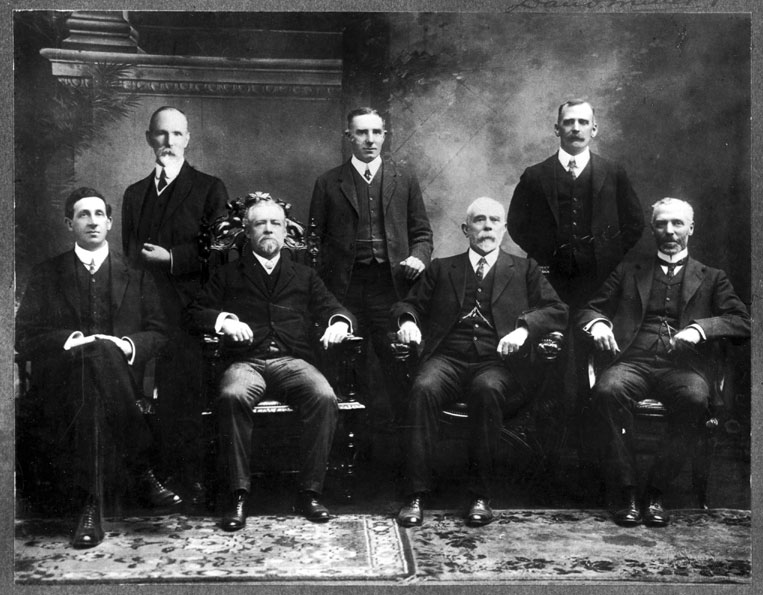
Inaugural Departmental Heads of the Australian Commonwealth Public Service-1901 Standing (l-to-r): Muirhead Collins (Defence); Atlee Hunt (External Affairs); David Miller (Home Affairs). Seated (l-to-r): Robert Garran (Attorney-General's); Harry Wollaston (Trade and Customs); Robert Scott (Postmaster-General's); George Allen (Treasury).

The Australian public service was established at Federation of Australia on 1 January 1901. The departments established on that date were Attorney-General's, Defence, External Affairs, Home Affairs, Trade and Customs, Postmaster-General's, and Treasury.

The first public service appointments were made under section 67 of the Constitution of Australia, an arrangement that remained in place until the Commonwealth Public Service Act 1902 commenced on 1 January 1903, at which time there were 11,374 officials employed under the Act.

The Commonwealth Public Service Act 1922 introduced a new legislative framework commencing in 1923, and created the Public Service Board.

A section in both the 1902 and 1922 Acts stated that every female officer was deemed to have retired from the Commonwealth service upon her marriage. In November 1966 Australia became the last democratic country to lift the legislated marriage bar which had prevented married women from holding permanent positions in the public service.

In November 1996, Peter Reith issued a discussion paper, Towards a best practice Australian Public Service. The paper, among other things, recommended key elements which might need to be incorporated into a new streamlined and principles-based Public Service Act. After several years spent developing a new Act, the Public Service Act 1999 came into effect on 5 December 1999. The new Act introduced APS Values and a Code of Conduct into the Act for the first time. Public servants who breach the code of conduct can be demoted, fined, reprimanded or fired.

In 2010 a comprehensive reform agenda was introduced as outlined in Ahead of the Game: Blueprint for Reform of Australian Government Administration. The reforms were aimed at strengthening strategic direction, citizen engagement and staff capability across the APS.

== Functions and values ==
Geoff Gallop describes the spectrum of activities undertaken by staff in the APS as fitting into four work functions: service delivery; law making, rule making and policy development; tax collection and managing government finance; and monitoring and enforcing laws and regulations.

The APS Values are set out in section 10 of the Public Service Act 1999. The Values are mandatory and are intended to embody the principles of good public administration.

The APS Values were most recently revised in 2024, with the aim to comprise a smaller set of core values that are meaningful, memorable and effective in driving change. The values are stated in section 10 of the Public Service Act 1999 as follows:

- Impartial: The APS is apolitical and provides the Government with advice that is frank, honest, timely and based on the best available evidence.
- Committed to service: The APS is professional, objective, innovative and efficient, and works collaboratively to achieve the best results for the Australian community and the Government.
- Accountable: The APS is open and accountable to the Australian community under the law and within the framework of Ministerial responsibility.
- Respectful: The APS respects all people, including their rights and their heritage.
- Ethical: The APS demonstrates leadership, is trustworthy, and acts with integrity, in all that it does.
- Stewardship: The APS builds its capability and institutional knowledge, and supports the public interest now and into the future, by understanding the long-term impacts of what it does.

== Composition ==
Historical population
Year	Pop.	±%
1901	11,191	—
1916	22,686	+102.7%
1917	23,028	+1.5%
1929	30,738	+33.5%
1930	30,561	−0.6%
1933	27,030	−11.6%
1939	47,043	+74.0%
1948	120,991	+157.2%
1965	182,689	+51.0%
1966	192,215	+5.2%
1968	211,652	+10.1%
1975	158,763	−25.0%
1982	152,258	−4.1%
1985	173,444	+13.9%
1986	143,339	−17.4%
1990	160,942	+12.3%
1991	162,367	+0.9%
1992	163,669	+0.8%
1993	165,529	+1.1%
1994	160,348	−3.1%
1995	146,035	−8.9%
1996	143,193	−1.9%
1997	134,052	−6.4%
1998	121,003	−9.7%
1999	113,268	−6.4%
2000	110,954	−2.0%
2001	119,237	+7.5%
2002	123,494	+3.6%
2003	131,720	+6.7%
2004	131,522	−0.2%
2005	133,581	+1.6%
2006	146,234	+9.5%
2007	155,482	+6.3%
2008	160,011	+2.9%
2009	162,009	+1.2%
2010	164,596	+1.6%
2011	166,252	+1.0%
2012	168,580	+1.4%
2013	167,257	−0.8%
2014	159,126	−4.9%
2015	152,430	−4.2%
2016	155,771	+2.2%
2017	178,611	+14.7%
2023	170,332	−4.6%
2024	185,343	+8.8%
2025	198,529	+7.1%
APS staff employed by year. Figures gathered from annual State of the Service reports and historic news articles

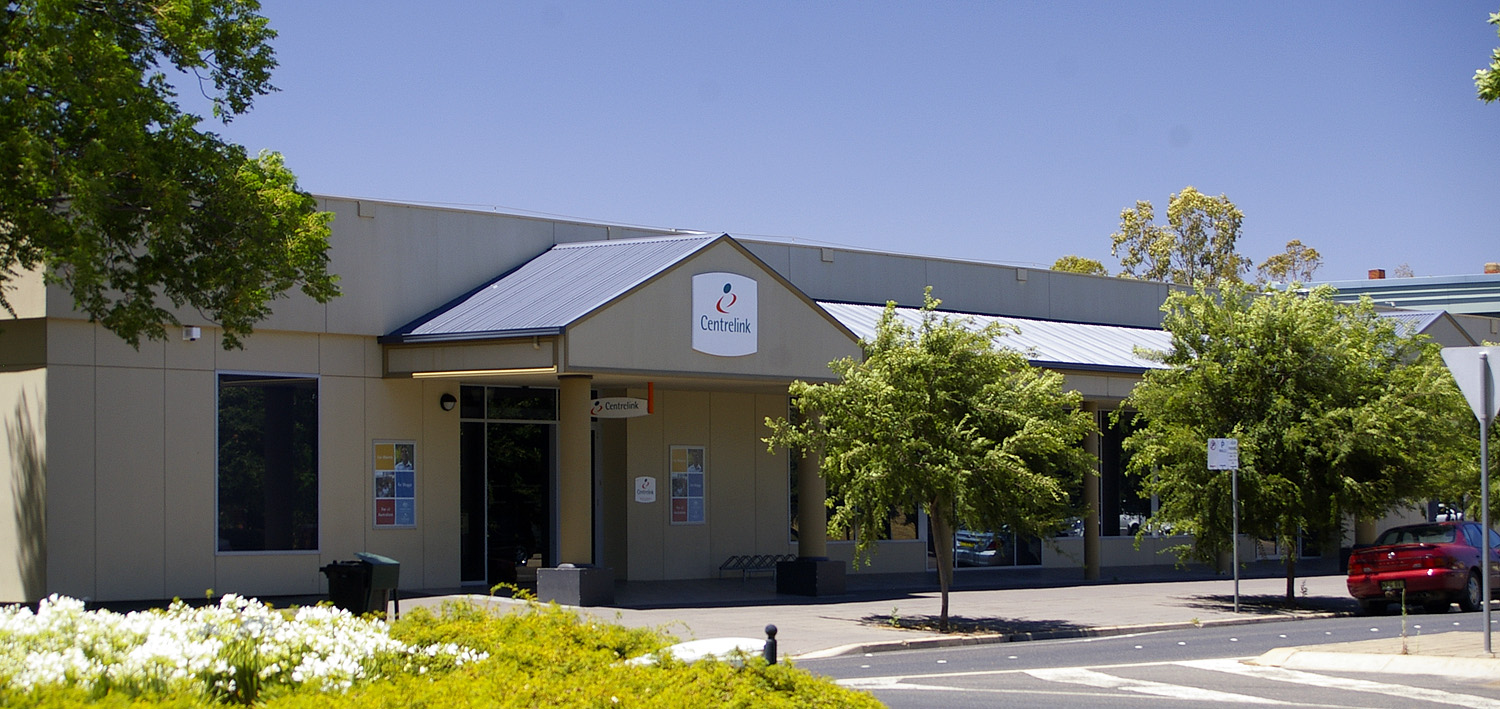
A Centrelink office in Wagga Wagga, New South Wales. Services Australia, which administers Centrelink services, is one of the largest APS agencies.

The Australian Public Service formally comprises all Australian Government departments and agencies where staff members are or can be employed under the Public Service Act 1999. At December 2021, there were 155,796 APS employees, up 4.8% from December 2020. Staffing in Australian Public Service agencies accounts for around half of total employment in Australian Government administration. Public servants employed by the Commonwealth Government under legislation other than the Public Service Act include Australian Defence Force personnel, government business enterprise employees, parliamentary staff, Australian Federal Police staff and public servants under other Commonwealth agency-specific legislation.

In the decade to December 2012 the APS grew in numbers; there was also notable 'classification creep', in which a higher proportion of staff are employed at higher pay-grade levels. Before the 2013 federal election, the Coalition promised to reduce the size of the public service by at least 12,000 jobs, through natural attrition. Joe Hockey told an Adelaide radio station in May 2013 that the Coalition planned for the loss of 12,000 public service jobs to be just a starting point in the first two years of a Coalition government.

=== Demographics ===
In June 2025, 60.5% of the APS were women and 35.4% worked in the Australian Capital Territory. At June 2013, the median age for ongoing APS employees was 43 years. Like the Australian population, the APS workforce has been ageing rapidly since the early 1990s.

At December 2023 the largest federal government agency was Services Australia with 31,797 employees, followed by the Australian Taxation Office with 21,019 employees and the Department of Defence with 19,059. The Department of Home Affairs had 15,140 employees, the National Disability Insurance Agency with 6,818 and the Department of Health, Disability and Ageing with 6,566.

In 2025, there was a ratio of one APS official for every 138 Australians. In 2023 there was a ratio of one APS official for every 161 Australians, compared to 1991 ratios of 1:106 and a ratio of 1:58 in 1968. In June 2024 APS staff were 1.36% of the Australian workforce, compared to 1.52% in 2008.

As of 2024, 36.9% of the APS worked in the ACT, 17.3% in NSW, and 16.6% in Victoria, with the rest in other states and territories.

== Measuring APS performance ==
Beginning in 2009–10 all APS entities were required to report in accordance with the Outcomes and Programs Framework, whereby programs provide the link between Australian Government decisions, activities and their actual outcomes. In the Outcomes and Programs Framework, organisations identify and report against the programs that contribute to government outcomes over the budget and forward years. All APS agencies contribute to Portfolio Budget Statements that inform Parliament and the public of the proposed allocation of Government outcomes. Portfolio budget statements outline:

- outcome statements, which specifically articulate the intended results, impacts or consequences of actions by the Government on the Australian community;
- programs to address outcomes, which are designed to deliver benefits, services or transfer payments to target groups; and
- resourcing information, deliverables and key performance indicators for each program.

Annual reports report performance of agencies in relation to services provided.

Prior to the introduction of the Outcomes and Programs Framework APS entities reported against an Outcomes and Outputs Framework, which had been introduced in 1999. Reforms have been progressively introduced to the APS with the specific aim of making it more efficient, accountable and responsive to community needs since the mid-1980s.

The Australian National Audit Office provides the Australian Parliament and the public with an independent assessment of selected areas of public administration in the APS, and assurance about APS financial reporting, administration and accountability.

=== Benchmarking the APS ===
In November 2009, KPMG published a report benchmarking Australian Public Service performance against international public services. The report found that the APS measured up well against some of the world's leading public services. The report found that the APS is a high performer compared to other public services when it came to: being responsive to economic changes; being independent and values-based; and for proportions of women employed. It found that the APS performed poorly in: its capability for coordinated, informed and strategic policy; its mechanisms for integrating external stakeholders into policy development and service design; and its understanding of government priorities through an overarching framework.

=== Public opinion and criticism ===
The APS is often the target of public criticism. For example, in 2013, Alan Moran, the director of deregulation at the conservative libertarian think tank the Institute of Public Affairs, argued that the Australian Government was not seeking enough savings from a bloated Australian Public Service. In October 2013, newly appointed Defence Minister David Johnston told media he had "inherited a mess" and that he believed that in the Defence department "23,000 public servants is too heavy." The Noetic group said in 2014 that most Australian Public Service organisations could not demonstrate the benefits from large and expensive programs of work.

Other commentators, including political scientist Richard Mulgan, have argued that rhetoric in 2013 about a bloated APS is ill-informed and unsustainable, if service benchmarks are to be met. Rob Burgess, in a Business Spectator article in November 2012 argued that efficiency dividends imposed on the public service are actually delivering one of the world's leaner public sectors.

== Personnel organisation ==
All APS vacancies for ongoing and non-ongoing jobs for more than 12 months are notified in the APS Employment Gazette, a weekly electronic publication. Public service wages were decentralised in 1997, allowing individual APS agencies to negotiate their own pay deals. Individual Australian Government agency websites also advertise jobs and some jobs are advertised on external job boards, such as in newspapers.

=== Employment classifications ===
The Australian Public Service (APS) career structure is hierarchical. The table below lists APS employment classification levels from lowest to highest.

Employment classifications in the Australian Public Service
Level/classification	Example position titles^{[A]}	Median Total Reward^{[B]} (Including Superannuation 2023)	Percent at level
Graduate	Graduate	$82,166	0.9%
APS 1	Departmental Officer	$64,199	1.9%
APS 2	Departmental Officer	$68,518	2.2%
APS 3	Departmental Officer	$77,984	6.6%
APS 4	Departmental Officer	$89,938	18.6%
APS 5	Departmental Officer	$99,365	14.5%
APS 6	Departmental Officer	$115,995	23.7%
Executive Level 1 (EL1)	Assistant Director; Manager; Assistant Section Manager	$146,019	20.7%
Executive Level 2 (EL2)	Director; Section Manager; Section Head	$182,765	8.8%
Senior Executive Service Band 1 (SES Band 1)	Assistant Secretary (AS); Branch Head; Branch Manager (BM)	$268,459	1.3%
Senior Executive Service Band 2 (SES Band 2)	First Assistant Secretary (FAS); Division Head; Division Manager	$344,027	0.5% (Band 2 and above)
Senior Executive Service Band 3 (SES Band 3)	Deputy Secretary (DEPSEC); Chief Executive Officer	$468,584	
Departmental head	Secretary	$673,000 (2013)	

^{A} Position titles vary across APS agencies.
^{B} Total annual base includes base salary, plus benefits such as superannuation, annual base salary scales vary across APS agencies.

=== Leadership ===
The Australian Public Service Commission (APSC) is responsible to the Minister for the Public Service. The APSC is led by a Commissioner, who is tasked with promoting the APS Values, evaluating public service performance and compliance, and helping to build the capability of the Service.

The Government also recognises a role for the Secretary of the Department of Prime Minister and Cabinet for certain aspects of leadership of the APS.

== See also ==
- List of Australian Government entities
- Judiciary of Australia
- Public Service Medal (Australia)
- British Civil Service

Concepts:

- Bureaucracy
- Public administration
- Public policy
- Public sector
- Public service

== References and further reading ==
- Australian Public Service Commission (2014), Main features:APS at a glance, archived from the original on 5 October 2014
- Australian Public Service Commission, APS at a glance, Australian Government
- Australian National Audit Office (2011), Development and Implementation of Key Performance Indicators to Support the Outcomes and Programs Framework (PDF), Australian National Audit Office, ISBN 978-0642812100, archived from the original (PDF) on 21 October 2012
- Australian Public Service Commission (29 November 2012), State of the Service Report: State of the Service Series 2011–12 (PDF), Australian Public Service Commission, archived from the original (PDF) on 11 May 2013
- Australian Public Service Commission (2 December 2013), State of the Service Report: State of the Service Series 2012–13 (PDF), Australian Public Service Commission, ISBN 9780987454751, archived from the original (PDF) on 6 December 2013
- Australian Public Service Commission (2004), A history in three acts: Evolution of the Public Service Act 1999 (PDF), Australian Public Service Commission, archived from the original (PDF) on 14 May 2013
- Berg, Chris (10 September 2013), Teaching the public service to obey its new masters, Australian Broadcasting Commission, archived from the original on 10 September 2013
- Department of the Prime Minister and Cabinet (March 2010), Ahead of the Game: Blueprint for the Reform of Australian Government Administration, Department of the Prime Minister and Cabinet, archived from the original on 6 November 2013
- Department of Finance (4 October 2013), Flipchart of FMA Act Agencies/CAC Act Bodies (PDF), Department of Finance, archived from the original (PDF) on 14 October 2013
- Department of Finance and Deregulation (December 2009), Commonwealth Programs Policy and Approval Process (PDF), Department of Finance and Deregulation, archived from the original (PDF) on 25 May 2013
- Holmes, Brenton (22 July 2011), "Citizens' engagement in policymaking and the design of public services", Research Paper, Department of Parliamentary Services, ISSN 1834-9854
- Keating, Paul (1 July 1993), Performance and Accountability in the Public Service, Department of the Prime Minister and Cabinet, archived from the original on 10 December 2013
- KPMG (November 2009), Benchmarking Australian Government Administration Performance (PDF), KPMG, archived from the original (PDF) on 30 April 2013
- Mulgan, Richard (10 November 1998), Politicising the Australian Public Service? (PDF), Department of the Parliamentary Library, archived from the original (PDF) on 8 November 2013
- Tiernan, Anne (9 September 2013), Transition to government: what now for the public service?, The Conversation, archived from the original on 17 December 2013
- Verspaandonk, Rose; Holland, Ian; Horne, Nicholas (11 October 2010), "Chronology of changes in the Australian Public Service 1975–2010", Background note, Parliament of Australia, Department of Parliamentary Services
- Watson, Sophie, ed. (1990). Playing the State: Australian Feminist Interventions. Verso. ISBN 0-86091-970-6.
- Whelan, James (August 2011), The State of the Australian Public Service: An alternative report (PDF), Centre for Policy Development, archived from the original (PDF) on 16 September 2012
