= Department of Markets =

Department of Markets may refer to:

== Australia ==
- Department of Markets and Transport
- Department of Markets (1928)
- Department of Markets (1930–1932)

== United States ==
- Commissioner of Public Markets, in New York City
