= Department of transportation =

Type of government agency responsible for transportation

The seal of the United States Department of Transportation

A department of transportation (DOT or DoT) is a government agency responsible for managing transportation. The term is primarily used in the United States to describe a transportation authority that coordinates or oversees transportation-related matters within its jurisdiction.

In the United States, the largest DOT is the United States Department of Transportation, a federal agency that oversees interstate travel and numerous other transportation agencies.

All U.S. states have their DOTs, responsible for managing and overseeing transportation, transportation-related infrastructure, and transportation safety in their respective states. They provide enforcement through DOT officers within their respective jurisdictions.

== List of U.S. state and insular area departments of transportation ==
- Alabama Department of Transportation (ALDOT)
- Alaska Department of Transportation and Public Facilities (DOT&PF)
- Arizona Department of Transportation (ADOT)
- Arkansas Department of Transportation (ARDOT)
- California Department of Transportation (Caltrans)
- Colorado Department of Transportation (CDOT)
- Connecticut
  - Connecticut Department of Transportation (CTDOT) - roads, bridges, rail, public transit
  - Connecticut Airport Authority (CAA) - airports
  - Connecticut Port Authority (CPA) - seaports
- Delaware Department of Transportation (DelDOT)
- Florida Department of Transportation (FDOT)
- Georgia Department of Transportation (GDOT)
- Hawaii Department of Transportation (HDOT)
- Idaho Transportation Department (ITD)
- Illinois Department of Transportation (IDOT)
- Indiana Department of Transportation (INDOT)
- Iowa Department of Transportation (Iowa DOT)
- Kansas Department of Transportation (KDOT)
- Kentucky Transportation Cabinet (KYTC)
- Louisiana Department of Transportation and Development (DOTD)
- Maine Department of Transportation (MaineDOT)
- Maryland Department of Transportation (MDOT)
- Massachusetts Department of Transportation (MassDOT)
- Michigan Department of Transportation (MDOT)
- Minnesota Department of Transportation (MnDOT)
- Mississippi Department of Transportation (MDOT)
- Missouri Department of Transportation (MoDOT)
- Montana Department of Transportation (MDT)
- Nebraska
  - Nebraska Department of Transportation (NDOT) - roads, rail, and public transportation
  - Nebraska Department of Aeronautics - airports
  - Nebraska Game and Parks Commission - waterways
- Nevada Department of Transportation (NDOT)
- New Hampshire Department of Transportation (NHDOT)
- New Jersey Department of Transportation (NJDOT)
- New Mexico Department of Transportation (NMDOT)
- New York
  - New York State Department of Transportation (NYSDOT)
  - New York State Thruway Authority (NYSTA)
  - New York State Bridge Authority (NYSBA)
- North Carolina Department of Transportation (NCDOT)
- North Dakota Department of Transportation (NDDOT)
- Ohio Department of Transportation (ODOT)
- Oklahoma Department of Transportation (ODOT)
- Oregon Department of Transportation (ODOT)
- Pennsylvania Department of Transportation (PennDOT)
- Puerto Rico Department of Transportation and Public Works (DTOP)
- Rhode Island
  - Rhode Island Department of Transportation (RIDOT)
  - Rhode Island Turnpike and Bridge Authority (RITBA) - toll bridges
- South Carolina Department of Transportation (SCDOT)
- South Dakota Department of Transportation (SDDOT)
- Tennessee Department of Transportation (TDOT)
- Texas Department of Transportation (TxDOT)
- Utah Department of Transportation (UDOT)
- Vermont Agency of Transportation (VTrans)
- Virginia Department of Transportation (VDOT)
- Washington State Department of Transportation (WSDOT)
- West Virginia Department of Transportation (WVDOT)
- Wisconsin Department of Transportation (WisDOT)
- Wyoming Department of Transportation (WYDOT)

== Local departments of transportation ==
- Baltimore City Department of Transportation (BCDOT)
- Charlotte Department of Transportation (CDOT)
- Cincinnati Department of Transportation and Engineering (DOTE)
- Chicago Department of Transportation (CDOT)
- Detroit Department of Transportation (DDOT)
- District Department of Transportation (d.DOT) (Washington, D.C.)
- Los Angeles Department of Transportation (LADOT)
- New York City Department of Transportation (NYCDOT)
- Seattle Department of Transportation (SDOT)

== By country ==
Though the term "Department of Transportation" is most associated with the United States, the term has been used in various forms for other countries' transportation authorities.

- In Australia:
  - Department of Transport (1930–1932)
  - Department of Transport (1941–1950)
  - Department of Transport (1972–1982)
  - Department of Transport (1983–1987)
  - Department of Transport (1993–1996)
  - Department of Transport (Victoria, 2008–13)
  - Department of Transport (Victoria) (current)
  - Department of Transport (Western Australia) (2009-2025)
- In India:
  - Department of Transport – Tamil Nadu, India
  - Department of Transport - Kerala, India
  - Department of Transport (West Bengal)
  - Department of Transport (Telangana)
  - Department of Transport (Andhra Pradesh)
  - Department of Transport (Jharkhand)
- Department of Transportation – Philippines
- Department of Transport – Ireland
- Department of Transportation and Infrastructure – New Brunswick, Canada
- Department of Transportation and Infrastructure Renewal – Nova Scotia, Canada
- Department of Transportation, Communications and Infrastructure – Federated States of Micronesia
- Department of Transport (South Africa)

== See also ==
- Ministry of transport – an equivalent used in countries that use the term "ministry"
- Port authority
