= Department of the Interior (disambiguation) =

Department of the Interior usually refers to the United States Department of the Interior.

Department of the Interior may also refer to:

- Department of the Interior (1932–39), an Australian government department that existed 1932–1939
- Department of the Interior (1939–72), an Australian government department that existed 1939–1972
- Ministry of Interior, a government department typically responsible for policing, emergency management, national security, elections, and immigration
  - List of interior ministries in different countries
