= Minister for Interior (Australia) =

- Style: The Honourable
- Appointer: Governor-General on the recommendation of the Prime Minister of Australia
- Inaugural holder: Archdale Parkhill
- Formation: 12 April 1932

The Australian Minister for Interior was a ministerial portfolio responsible for the local government and external territories administration. The portfolio was originally held by the Minister for Home Affairs from 1901 to 1932 and then Minister for the Interior in the first Lyons Ministry—subsuming his portfolios of Home Affairs and Transport.

The establishment of portfolios such as Transport, Immigration, Agriculture and Industry left the Minister for the Interior mainly responsible for administering the Australian Capital Territory and the Northern Territory, including, until 1967, the Aboriginal Australians residing there. On 19 December 1972, the interior portfolio was replaced in the Whitlam Ministry by the Minister for the Capital Territory and the Minister for the Northern Territory. The Northern Territory portfolio was abolished on 28 September 1978, following the granting of self-government to the Northern Territory. From July 1987, administration of the Australian Capital Territory was subsumed in the portfolio of Arts, Sport, the Environment, Tourism and Territories, anticipating ACT self-government on 11 May 1989.

== List of ministers ==
=== Interior ===
The following individuals have been appointed as Minister for the Interior:

Order	Minister	Party	Prime Minister	Title	Term start	Term end	Term in office
1	Archdale Parkhill	United Australia	Lyons	Minister for the Interior	12 April 1932	13 October 1932	184 days
2	John Perkins	United Australia	Lyons	Minister for the Interior	13 October 1932	12 October 1934	1 year, 364 days
3	Eric Harrison	United Australia	Lyons	Minister for the Interior	12 October 1934	9 November 1934	28 days
4	Thomas Paterson	Country	Lyons	Minister for the Interior	9 November 1934	29 November 1937	3 years, 20 days
5	John McEwen	Country	Lyons	Minister for the Interior	29 November 1937	7 April 1939	1 year, 148 days
5	John McEwen	Country	Page	Minister for the Interior	7 April 1939	26 April 1939	1 year, 148 days
6	Harry Foll	United Australia	Menzies	Minister for the Interior	26 April 1939	29 August 1941	2 years, 164 days
6	Harry Foll	United Australia	Fadden	Minister for the Interior	29 August 1941	7 October 1941	2 years, 164 days
7	Joe Collings	Labor	Curtin	Minister for the Interior	7 October 1941	6 July 1945	3 years, 279 days
7	Joe Collings	Labor	Forde	Minister for the Interior	6 July 1945	13 July 1945	3 years, 279 days
8	Herbert Johnson	Labor	Chifley	Minister for the Interior	13 July 1945	19 December 1949	4 years, 159 days
9	Philip McBride	Liberal	Menzies	Minister for the Interior	19 December 1949	24 October 1950	309 days
n/a	Eric Harrison	Liberal	Menzies	Minister for the Interior	24 October 1950	11 May 1951	199 days
10	Wilfrid Kent Hughes	Liberal	Menzies	Minister for the Interior	11 May 1951	11 January 1956	4 years, 245 days
11	Allen Fairhall	Liberal	Menzies	Minister for the Interior	11 January 1956	10 December 1958	2 years, 333 days
12	Gordon Freeth	Liberal	Menzies	Minister for the Interior	10 December 1958	18 December 1963	5 years, 8 days
13	John Gorton	Liberal	Menzies	Minister for the Interior	18 December 1963	4 March 1964	77 days
14	Doug Anthony	Country	Menzies	Minister for the Interior	4 March 1964	26 January 1966	3 years, 226 days
14	Doug Anthony	Country	Holt	Minister for the Interior	26 January 1966	16 October 1967	3 years, 226 days
15	Peter Nixon	Country	Holt	Minister for the Interior	16 October 1967	19 December 1967	3 years, 112 days
15	Peter Nixon	Country	McEwen	Minister for the Interior	19 December 1967	10 January 1968	3 years, 112 days
15	Peter Nixon	Country	Gorton	Minister for the Interior	10 January 1968	5 February 1971	3 years, 112 days
16	Ralph Hunt	Country	Gorton	Minister for the Interior	5 February 1971	10 March 1971	1 year, 304 days
16	Ralph Hunt	Country	McMahon	Minister for the Interior	10 March 1971	5 December 1972	1 year, 304 days
17	Lance Barnard	Labor	Whitlam	Minister for the Interior	5 December 1972	19 December 1972	14 days

=== Territories ===
The following individuals have been appointed as Minister for Territories, or any precedent titles:

Order	Minister	Party	Prime Minister	Title	Term start	Term end	Term in office
1	Fred Bamford	National Labor	Hughes	Minister for Home and Territories	14 November 1916	17 February 1917	95 days
2	Paddy Glynn, KC	Nationalist	Hughes	Minister for Home and Territories	17 February 1917	3 February 1920	2 years, 351 days
3	Alexander Poynton, OBE	Nationalist	Hughes	Minister for Home and Territories	3 February 1920	21 December 1921	1 year, 321 days
4	George Pearce	Nationalist	Hughes	Minister for Home and Territories	21 December 1921	9 February 1923	4 years, 179 days
4	George Pearce	Nationalist	Bruce	Minister for Home and Territories	9 February 1923	18 June 1926	4 years, 179 days
5	Sir William Glasgow, KCB, CMG, DSO, VD	Nationalist	Bruce	Minister for Home and Territories	18 June 1926	2 April 1927	288 days
6	Charles Marr, DSO, MC	Nationalist	Bruce	Minister for Home and Territories	2 April 1927	24 February 1928	328 days
7	Sir Neville Howse, VC, KCB, KCMG	Nationalist	Bruce	Minister for Home and Territories	24 February 1928	29 November 1928	279 days
8	Aubrey Abbott	Country	Bruce	Minister for Home and Territories	29 November 1928	22 October 1929	327 days
(6)	Charles Marr	United Australia	Lyons	Minister in charge of Territories	6 January 1932	24 May 1934	2 years, 138 days
9	Harry Lawson	United Australia	Lyons	Minister in charge of Territories	24 May 1934	12 October 1934	141 days
10	George Pearce	United Australia	Lyons	Minister in charge of Territories	12 October 1934	29 November 1937	3 years, 48 days
11	Billy Hughes	United Australia	Lyons	Minister in charge of Territories	29 November 1937	7 November 1938	343 days
12	John Perkins	United Australia	Lyons	Minister without portfolio administering External Territories	7 November 1938	8 November 1938	1 day
13	Eric Harrison	United Australia	Lyons	Minister without portfolio administering External Territories	8 November 1938	7 April 1939	169 days
13	Eric Harrison	United Australia	Page	Minister without portfolio administering External Territories	7 April 1939	26 April 1939	169 days
(12)	John Perkins	United Australia	Menzies	Minister without portfolio administering External Territories	26 April 1939	14 March 1940	323 days
14	Horace Nock	Country	Menzies	Minister without portfolio in charge of External Territories	14 March 1940	28 October 1940	228 days
15	Thomas Collins	Country	Menzies	Minister without portfolio assisting the Prime Minister dealing with External Territories	28 October 1940	26 June 1941	241 days
16	Allan McDonald	United Australia	Menzies	Minister for External Territories	26 June 1941	29 August 1941	103 days
16	Allan McDonald	United Australia	Fadden	Minister for External Territories	29 August 1941	7 October 1941	103 days
17	James Fraser	Labor	Curtin	Minister for External Territories	7 October 1941	21 September 1943	1 year, 349 days
18	Eddie Ward	Labor	Curtin	Minister for External Territories	21 September 1943	6 July 1945	6 years, 89 days
18	Eddie Ward	Labor	Forde	Minister for External Territories	6 July 1945	13 July 1945	6 years, 89 days
18	Eddie Ward	Labor	Chifley	Minister for External Territories	13 July 1945	19 December 1949	6 years, 89 days
19	Percy Spender	Liberal	Menzies	Minister for External Territories	19 December 1949	26 April 1951	1 year, 128 days
20	Richard Casey	Liberal	Menzies	Minister for External Territories	27 April 1951	11 May 1951	15 days
21	Paul Hasluck	Liberal	Menzies	Minister for Territories	11 May 1951	18 December 1963	12 years, 221 days
22	Charles Barnes	Country	Menzies	Minister for Territories	18 December 1963	26 January 1966	8 years, 38 days
22	Charles Barnes	Country	Holt	Minister for Territories	26 January 1966	19 December 1967	8 years, 38 days
22	Charles Barnes	Country	McEwen	Minister for Territories	19 December 1967	10 January 1968	8 years, 38 days
22	Charles Barnes	Country	Gorton	Minister for Territories	10 January 1968	28 February 1968	8 years, 38 days
22	Charles Barnes	Country	Gorton	Minister for External Territories	28 February 1968	10 March 1971	8 years, 38 days
22	Charles Barnes	Country	McMahon	Minister for External Territories	10 March 1971	25 January 1972	8 years, 38 days
23	Andrew Peacock	Liberal	McMahon	Minister for External Territories	25 January 1972	5 December 1972	315 days
24	Gough Whitlam^{1}	Labor	Whitlam	Minister for External Territories	5 December 1972	19 December 1972	14 days
25	Bill Morrison	Labor	Whitlam	Minister for External Territories	19 December 1972	30 November 1973	346 days
26	Tom Uren	Labor	Hawke	Minister for Territories and Local Government	11 March 1983	13 December 1984	1 year, 277 days
27	Gordon Scholes	Labor	Hawke	Minister for Territories	13 December 1984	24 July 1987	2 years, 223 days
28	John Brown	Labor	Hawke	Minister for the Arts, Sport, the Environment, Tourism and Territories	24 July 1987	18 December 1987	147 days
29	Gary Punch	Labor	Hawke	Minister for the Arts and Territories	19 January 1988	2 September 1988	227 days
30	Clyde Holding	Labor	Hawke	Minister for the Arts and Territories	2 September 1988	22 May 1989	1 year, 214 days
30	Clyde Holding	Labor	Hawke	Minister for the Arts, Tourism and Territories	22 May 1989	4 April 1990	1 year, 214 days
31	David Simmons	Labor	Hawke	Minister for the Arts, Tourism and Territories	4 April 1990	20 December 1991	1 year, 267 days
31	David Simmons	Labor	Keating	Minister for the Arts, Tourism and Territories	20 December 1991	27 December 1991	1 year, 267 days
32	Wendy Fatin	Labor	Keating	Minister for the Arts and Territories	27 December 1991	24 March 1993	1 year, 87 days
33	Ros Kelly	Labor	Keating	Minister for the Environment, Sport and Territories	24 March 1993	1 March 1994	342 days
34	Graham Richardson	Labor	Keating	Minister for the Environment, Sport and Territories	1 March 1994	25 March 1994	24 days
35	John Faulkner	Labor	Keating	Minister for the Environment, Sport and Territories	25 March 1994	11 March 1996	1 year, 352 days
36	Warwick Smith	Liberal	Howard	Minister for Sport, Territories and Local Government	11 March 1996	9 October 1997	1 year, 212 days
37	Alex Somlyay	Liberal	Howard	Minister for Regional Development, Territories and Local Government	9 October 1997	21 October 1998	1 year, 12 days
38	Ian Macdonald	Liberal	Howard	Minister for Regional Services, Territories and Local Government	21 October 1998	26 November 2001	3 years, 36 days
39	Wilson Tuckey	Liberal	Howard	Minister for Regional Services, Territories and Local Government	25 January 2002	7 October 2003	1 year, 255 days
(38)	Ian Macdonald	Liberal	Howard	Minister for Local Government, Territories and Roads	7 October 2003	18 July 2004	285 days
40	Jim Lloyd	Liberal	Howard	Minister for Local Government, Territories and Roads	18 July 2004	3 December 2007	3 years, 138 days
41	Catherine King	Labor	Gillard	Minister for Regional Services, Local Communities and Territories	25 March 2013	1 July 2013	177 days
41	Catherine King	Labor	Rudd	Minister for Regional Australia, Local Government and Territories	1 July 2013	18 September 2013	177 days
42	Paul Fletcher	Liberal	Turnbull	Minister for Territories, Local Government and Major Projects	21 September 2015	19 July 2016	302 days
43	Fiona Nash	National	Turnbull	Minister for Local Government and Territories	19 July 2016	27 October 2017	1 year, 100 days
44	Darren Chester	National	Turnbull	Minister for Local Government and Territories	27 October 2017	20 December 2017	54 days
45	John McVeigh	National	Turnbull	Minister for Regional Development, Territories and Local Government	20 December 2017	24 August 2018	251 days
45	John McVeigh	National	Morrison	Minister for Regional Development, Territories and Local Government	24 August 2018	28 August 2018	251 days
46	Sussan Ley	Liberal	Morrison	Assistant Minister for Regional Development and Territories	28 August 2018	29 May 2019	274 days
47	Nola Marino	Liberal	Morrison	Assistant Minister for Regional Development and Territories	29 May 2019	23 May 2022	2 years, 359 days
48	Kristy McBain	Labor	Albanese	Minister for Regional Development, Local Government and Territories	1 June 2022	Incumbent	4 years, 98 days

=== Capital Territory ===
The following individuals have been appointed as Minister for the Capital Territory:

Order	Minister	Party	Prime Minister	Title	Term start	Term end	Term in office
1	Kep Enderby	Labor	Whitlam	Minister for the Capital Territory	19 December 1972	9 October 1973	294 days
2	Gordon Bryant	Labor	Whitlam	Minister for the Capital Territory	9 October 1973	11 November 1975	2 years, 33 days
3	Reg Withers	Liberal	Fraser	Minister for the Capital Territory	11 November 1975	22 December 1975	41 days
4	Eric Robinson	Liberal	Fraser	Minister for the Capital Territory	22 December 1975	16 February 1976	56 days
5	Tony Staley	Liberal	Fraser	Minister for the Capital Territory	16 February 1976	20 December 1977	1 year, 307 days
6	Bob Ellicott	Liberal	Fraser	Minister for the Capital Territory	20 December 1977	3 November 1980	2 years, 319 days
7	Michael Hodgman	Liberal	Fraser	Minister for the Capital Territory	3 November 1980	11 March 1983	2 years, 128 days

=== Northern Territory ===
The following individuals have been appointed as Minister for the Northern Territory or successor titles:

Order	Minister	Party	Prime Minister	Title	Term start	Term end	Term in office
1	Kep Enderby	Labor	Whitlam	Minister for the Northern Territory^{1}	19 December 1972	19 October 1973	304 days
2	Rex Patterson^{1}	Labor	Whitlam	Minister for the Northern Territory^{1}	19 October 1973	6 June 1975	2 years, 2 days
2	Rex Patterson^{1}	Labor	Whitlam	Minister for Northern Australia	6 June 1975	21 October 1975	2 years, 2 days
3	Paul Keating	Labor	Whitlam	Minister for Northern Australia	21 October 1975	11 November 1975	21 days
4	Ian Sinclair	National Country	Fraser	Minister for Northern Australia	11 November 1975	22 December 1975	41 days
5	Evan Adermann	National Country	Fraser	Minister for the Northern Territory	22 December 1975	28 September 1978	2 years, 280 days
6	Bob Collins	Labor	Hawke	Minister Assisting the Prime Minister for Northern Australia	4 April 1990	20 December 1991	2 years, 53 days
6	Bob Collins	Labor	Keating	Minister Assisting the Prime Minister for Northern Australia	20 December 1991	27 May 1992	2 years, 53 days
7	Ben Humphreys	Labor	Keating	Minister Assisting the Prime Minister for Northern Australia	27 May 1992	24 March 1993	301 days
8	Josh Frydenberg	Liberal	Turnbull	Minister for Resources, Energy and Northern Australia	21 September 2015	18 February 2016	150 days
9	Matt Canavan	Liberal National	Turnbull	Minister for Northern Australia	18 February 2016	19 July 2016	1 year, 157 days
9	Matt Canavan	Liberal National	Turnbull	Minister for Resources and Northern Australia	19 July 2016	25 July 2017	1 year, 157 days
10	Barnaby Joyce	National	Turnbull	Minister for Resources and Northern Australia	25 July 2017	27 October 2017	94 days
(9)	Matt Canavan	Liberal National	Turnbull	Minister for Resources and Northern Australia	27 October 2017	24 August 2018	2 years, 99 days
(9)	Matt Canavan	Liberal National	Morrison	Minister for Resources and Northern Australia	24 August 2018	3 February 2020	2 years, 99 days
11	Keith Pitt; Scott Morrison	Liberal National	Morrison	Minister for Resources, Water and Northern Australia	6 February 2020	2 July 2021	1 year, 146 days
12	David Littleproud	Liberal National	Morrison	Minister for Agriculture and Northern Australia	2 July 2021	23 May 2022	325 days
13	Madeleine King	Labor	Albanese	Minister for Northern Australia	1 June 2022	Incumbent	4 years, 98 days

== See also ==
- Department of Home Affairs (1901–16)
- Department of Home and Territories
- Department of Home Affairs (1928–32)
- Department of the Interior (1932–39)
- Department of the Interior (1939–72)
- Department of Administrative Services (1975–84)
- Department of Home Affairs (1977–80)
- Department of Home Affairs and Environment (1980-84)
- Department of Local Government and Administrative Services (1984-87)
- Department of the Arts, Sport, the Environment, Tourism and Territories (1987-91)
- Department of the Arts, Sport, the Environment and Territories (1991-93)
- Department of the Environment, Sport and Territories (1993-97)
- Department of Transport and Regional Development (1996-98)
- Department of Transport and Regional Services (1998-07)
- Department of Infrastructure, Transport, Regional Development and Local Government (2007-2010
- Department of Regional Australia, Regional Development and Local Government (2010-2011)
- Department of Regional Australia, Local Government, Arts and Sport (2011-2013)
