= Minister for Home Affairs (Australia) =

Australian cabinet position

- Commonwealth Coat of Arms

- Flag of Australia

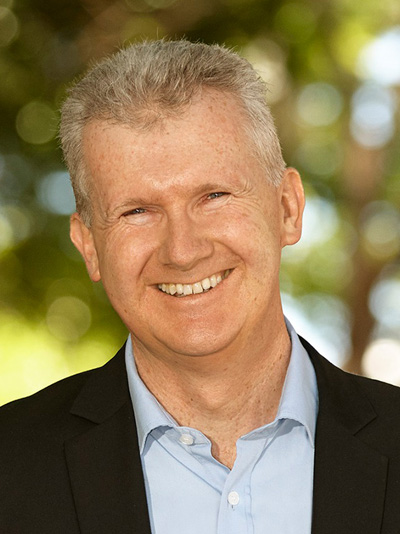
- Incumbent; Tony Burke since 29 July 2024
- Department of Home Affairs
- Appointer: Governor-General; on the advice of the prime minister
- Inaugural holder: William Lyne
- Formation: 1 January 1901
- Website: minister.homeaffairs.gov.au/ministers-for-home-affairs/the-hon-tony-burke-mp

The Minister for Home Affairs is the minister in the Australian government responsible for the Department of Home Affairs, the country's interior ministry. The current minister is Tony Burke of the Labor Party, who has held the position since July 2024 in the Albanese ministry.

The current Department of Home Affairs was created in December 2017. The first department with that name was created in 1901, as one of the original six departments created at Federation, and was responsible for a wide range of areas not captured by the other departments. Similar departments have existed in almost all subsequent governments, under several different names. The specific title "Minister for Home Affairs" has been created six times – in 1901, 1929, 1977, 1987, 2007 and 2017.

== History ==
The Minister for Home Affairs was a ministerial portfolio that existed continuously from 1901 to 12 April 1932, when Archdale Parkhill became Minister for the Interior in the first Lyons Ministry — subsuming his portfolios of Home Affairs and Transport.

The Home Affairs or Interior portfolio was responsible for various internal matters not handled by other ministries. In due course, other portfolios were established that took over functions from it, including:

- Transport from 1928 to 1932 and continuously since 1941
- Immigration since 1945
- Agriculture since 1942
- Industry from 1928 to 1945 and since 1963

The Minister for the Interior existed from 1932 to 1972. The Territories portfolio has been the responsibility for the varying titles of the Minister for Territories.

The Home Affairs Ministry was re-established in 2007, assuming the responsibilities of the Minister for Justice and Customs within the Attorney-General's Department with policy responsibilities for criminal justice, law enforcement, border control and national security and with oversight responsibilities of the Australian Customs Service and the Border Protection Command, the Australian Federal Police, the Australian Crime Commission, and the Office of Film and Literature Classification.

From September 2010 to September 2013, the Minister for Home Affairs also held the position of Minister for Justice. In September 2013 with the change of government, the position Minister for Home Affairs was disbanded and its responsibilities were assumed by the newly created Minister for Immigration and Border Protection for border control and by the Minister for Justice for law enforcement.

On 18 July 2017, Prime Minister Malcolm Turnbull announced the creation of a new home affairs department to be headed by Immigration Minister Peter Dutton, with responsibility for immigration, border control, domestic security, and law enforcement.

On 20 December 2017, Governor-General Peter Cosgrove swore Dutton into the position of Minister for Home Affairs. The Home Affairs portfolio was formed by way of an Administrative Arrangements Order issued on 20 December 2017 with responsibilities for national security including cybersecurity and counterterrorism, law enforcement, emergency management, transport security, immigration, citizenship, border control, and multicultural affairs.

In July 2024, upon the reshuffle of the Albanese Ministry, responsibility for oversight of ASIO was delegated to the Attorney-General's Department rather than being accountable to the Home Affairs Department. Prime Minister Albanese had previously moved responsibility for oversight of the AFP from the Home Affairs Department to the Attorney-General's Department in 2022 upon his election as Prime Minister.

== List of ministers for home affairs ==
The following individuals have been appointed as Minister for Home Affairs, or any of its related titles:

Order	Minister	Party	Prime Minister	Title	Term start	Term end	Term in office
1	Sir William Lyne, KCMG	Protectionist	Barton	Minister for Home Affairs	1 January 1901	11 August 1903	2 years, 222 days
2	Sir John Forrest, KCMG	Protectionist	Barton	Minister for Home Affairs	11 August 1903	24 September 1903	260 days
2	Sir John Forrest, KCMG	Protectionist	Deakin	Minister for Home Affairs	24 September 1903	27 April 1904	260 days
3	Lee Batchelor	Labor	Watson	Minister for Home Affairs	27 April 1904	17 August 1904	112 days
4	Dugald Thomson	Free Trade	Reid	Minister for Home Affairs	17 August 1904	5 July 1905	322 days
5	Littleton Groom, KC	Protectionist	Deakin	Minister for Home Affairs	5 July 1905	12 October 1906	1 year, 99 days
6	Thomas Ewing	Protectionist	Deakin	Minister for Home Affairs	12 October 1906	24 January 1907	104 days
7	John Keating	Protectionist	Deakin	Minister for Home Affairs	24 January 1907	13 November 1908	1 year, 294 days
8	Hugh Mahon	Labor	Fisher	Minister for Home Affairs	13 November 1908	2 June 1909	201 days
9	George Fuller	Liberal	Deakin	Minister for Home Affairs	2 June 1909	29 April 1910	331 days
10	King O'Malley	Labor	Fisher	Minister for Home Affairs	29 April 1910	24 June 1913	3 years, 56 days
11	Joseph Cook	Liberal	Cook	Minister for Home Affairs	24 June 1913	17 September 1914	1 year, 85 days
12	William Archibald	Labor	Fisher	Minister for Home Affairs	17 September 1914	27 October 1915	1 year, 40 days
(10)	King O'Malley	Labor	Hughes	Minister for Home Affairs	27 October 1915	14 November 1916	1 year, 18 days
13	Fred Bamford	National Labor	Hughes	Minister for Home and Territories	14 November 1916	17 February 1917	95 days
14	Paddy Glynn, KC	Nationalist	Hughes	Minister for Home and Territories	17 February 1917	3 February 1920	2 years, 351 days
15	Alexander Poynton, OBE	Nationalist	Hughes	Minister for Home and Territories	3 February 1920	21 December 1921	1 year, 321 days
16	George Pearce	Nationalist	Hughes	Minister for Home and Territories	21 December 1921	9 February 1923	4 years, 179 days
16	George Pearce	Nationalist	Bruce	Minister for Home and Territories	9 February 1923	18 June 1926	4 years, 179 days
17	Sir William Glasgow, KCB, CMG, DSO, VD	Nationalist	Bruce	Minister for Home and Territories	18 June 1926	2 April 1927	288 days
18	Charles Marr, DSO, MC	Nationalist	Bruce	Minister for Home and Territories	2 April 1927	24 February 1928	328 days
19	Sir Neville Howse, VC, KCB, KCMG	Nationalist	Bruce	Minister for Home and Territories	24 February 1928	29 November 1928	279 days
20	Aubrey Abbott	Country	Bruce	Minister for Home and Territories	29 November 1928	22 October 1929	327 days
21	Arthur Blakeley	Labor	Scullin	Minister for Home Affairs	22 October 1929	6 January 1932	2 years, 76 days
22	Sir Archdale Parkhill, KCMG	United Australia	Lyons	Minister for Home Affairs	6 January 1932	12 April 1932	97 days
23	Robert Ellicott, QC	Liberal	Fraser	Minister for Home Affairs	20 December 1977	3 November 1980	3 years, 59 days
23	Robert Ellicott, QC	Liberal	Fraser	Minister for Home Affairs and Environment	3 November 1980	17 February 1981	3 years, 59 days
24	Michael MacKellar	Liberal	Fraser	Minister for Home Affairs and Environment	17 February 1981	19 March 1981	30 days
25	Ian Wilson	Liberal	Fraser	Minister for Home Affairs and Environment	19 March 1981	7 May 1982	1 year, 49 days
26	Tom McVeigh	National Country	Fraser	Minister for Home Affairs and Environment	7 May 1982	16 October 1982	308 days
26	Tom McVeigh	National	Fraser	Minister for Home Affairs and Environment	16 October 1982	11 March 1983	308 days
27	Barry Cohen	Labor	Hawke	Minister for Home Affairs and Environment	11 March 1983	13 December 1984	1 year, 277 days
28	Robert Ray	Labor	Hawke	Minister for Home Affairs	24 July 1987	2 September 1988	1 year, 40 days
29	Bob Debus	Labor	Rudd	Minister for Home Affairs	3 December 2007	9 June 2009	1 year, 188 days
30	Brendan O'Connor	Labor	Rudd	Minister for Home Affairs	9 June 2009	24 June 2010	2 years, 188 days
30	Brendan O'Connor	Labor	Gillard	Minister for Home Affairs	24 June 2010	14 December 2011	2 years, 188 days
31	Jason Clare	Labor	Gillard	Minister for Home Affairs	14 December 2011	27 June 2013	1 year, 278 days
31	Jason Clare	Labor	Rudd	Minister for Home Affairs	27 June 2013	18 September 2013	1 year, 278 days
32	Peter Dutton	Liberal	Turnbull	Minister for Home Affairs	20 December 2017	24 August 2018	3 years, 100 days
32	Peter Dutton	Liberal	Morrison	Minister for Home Affairs	24 August 2018	30 March 2021	3 years, 100 days
33	Karen Andrews^{1}	Liberal	Morrison	Minister for Home Affairs	30 March 2021	23 May 2022	1 year, 54 days
33	Scott Morrison^{1}	Liberal	Morrison	Minister for Home Affairs	6 May 2021	23 May 2022	1 year, 17 days
*	Jim Chalmers (Interim)	Labor	Albanese	Minister for Home Affairs	23 May 2022	1 June 2022	9 days
34	Clare O'Neil	Labor	Albanese	Minister for Home Affairs	1 June 2022	29 July 2024	2 years, 58 days
35	Tony Burke	Labor	Albanese	Minister for Home Affairs	29 July 2024	incumbent	2 years, 110 days

^{1} Morrison was appointed as Minister for Home Affairs by the Governor-General on Morrison's advice in May 2021, with both Morrison and Andrews holding the position of Minister for Home Affairs until May 2022. However, the appointment of Morrison was not made public until August 2022.

== Former ministerial titles ==
=== List of ministers for customs ===
From 1901 to 1956 Customs was handled by the Minister for Trade and Customs. In 1956 Frederick Osborne was appointed Minister for Customs and Excise. Kep Enderby was appointed Minister for Police and Customs in 1975. In 1975 responsibility for customs was absorbed into the portfolio of the Minister for Business and Consumer Affairs, John Howard. In May 1982, the portfolio of the Minister for Business and Consumer Affairs was abolished and customs functions were transferred to the Minister for Industry and Commerce, Phillip Lynch. In January 1988, Barry Jones became responsible for customs as Minister for Science, Customs and Small Business within John Button's portfolio of Industry and Commerce and there were subsequently junior ministers responsible for customs within the industry portfolio until March 1993 and from March 1994 until December 2007, when customs became part of the responsibility of the Minister for Home Affairs, Bob Debus. Between September 2013 and December 2017, it was the responsibility of the Minister for Immigration and Border Protection.

The following individuals have held responsibility for customs:

Order	Minister	Party	Prime Minister	Title	Term start	Term end	Term in office
1	Charles Kingston	Protectionist	Barton	Minister for Trade and Customs	1 January 1901	24 July 1903	2 years, 204 days
2	William Lyne	Protectionist	Barton	Minister for Trade and Customs	11 August 1903	24 September 1903	260 days
2	William Lyne	Protectionist	Deakin	Minister for Trade and Customs	24 September 1903	27 April 1904	260 days
3	Andrew Fisher	Labor	Watson	Minister for Trade and Customs	27 April 1904	17 August 1904	112 days
4	Allan McLean	Protectionist	Reid	Minister for Trade and Customs	17 August 1904	5 July 1905	322 days
5	William Lyne	Protectionist	Deakin	Minister for Trade and Customs	5 July 1905	30 July 1907	2 years, 25 days
6	Austin Chapman	Protectionist	Deakin	Minister for Trade and Customs	30 July 1907	13 November 1908	1 year, 106 days
7	Frank Tudor	Labor	Fisher	Minister for Trade and Customs	13 November 1908	2 June 1909	201 days
8	Robert Best	Protectionist	Deakin	Minister for Trade and Customs	2 June 1909	29 April 1910	331 days
n/a	Frank Tudor	Labor	Fisher	Minister for Trade and Customs	29 April 1910	24 June 1913	3 years, 56 days
9	Littleton Groom	Commonwealth Liberal	Cook	Minister for Trade and Customs	24 June 1913	17 September 1914	1 year, 85 days
n/a	Frank Tudor	Labor	Fisher	Minister for Trade and Customs	17 September 1914	27 October 1915	1 year, 363 days
n/a	Frank Tudor	Labor	Hughes	Minister for Trade and Customs	27 October 1915	14 September 1916	1 year, 363 days
10	Billy Hughes	Labor	Hughes	Minister for Trade and Customs	29 September 1916	14 November 1916	61 days
11	William Archibald	National Labor	Hughes	Minister for Trade and Customs	14 November 1916	17 February 1917	95 days
12	Jens Jensen	Nationalist	Hughes	Minister for Trade and Customs	17 February 1917	13 December 1918	1 year, 299 days
13	William Watt	Nationalist	Hughes	Minister for Trade and Customs	13 December 1918	17 January 1919	35 days
14	Walter Massy-Greene	Nationalist	Hughes	Minister for Trade and Customs	17 January 1919	21 December 1921	2 years, 338 days
15	Arthur Rodgers	Nationalist	Hughes	Minister for Trade and Customs	21 December 1921	5 February 1923	1 year, 46 days
n/a	Austin Chapman	Nationalist	Bruce	Minister for Trade and Customs	9 February 1923	26 May 1924	1 year, 107 days
n/a	Littleton Groom	Nationalist	Bruce	Minister for Trade and Customs	29 May 1924	13 June 1924	15 days
16	Herbert Pratten	Nationalist	Bruce	Minister for Trade and Customs	13 June 1924	7 May 1928	3 years, 329 days
17	Stanley Bruce	Nationalist	Bruce	Minister for Trade and Customs	8 May 1928	24 November 1928	200 days
18	Henry Gullett	Nationalist	Bruce	Minister for Trade and Customs	24 November 1928	22 October 1929	332 days
19	James Fenton	Labor	Scullin	Minister for Trade and Customs	22 October 1929	4 February 1931	1 year, 105 days
20	Frank Forde	Labor	Scullin	Minister for Trade and Customs	4 February 1931	6 January 1932	336 days
n/a	Henry Gullett	United Australia	Lyons	Minister for Trade and Customs	6 January 1932	14 January 1933	1 year, 8 days
21	Thomas White	United Australia	Lyons	Minister for Trade and Customs	14 January 1933	8 November 1938	5 years, 298 days
22	John Perkins	United Australia	Lyons	Minister for Trade and Customs	8 November 1938	7 April 1939	169 days
22	John Perkins	United Australia	Page	Minister for Trade and Customs	7 April 1939	26 April 1939	169 days
23	John Lawson	United Australia	Menzies	Minister for Trade and Customs	26 April 1939	23 February 1940	303 days
24	Robert Menzies	United Australia	Menzies	Minister for Trade and Customs	23 February 1940	14 March 1940	20 days
25	George McLeay	United Australia	Menzies	Minister for Trade and Customs	14 March 1940	28 October 1940	228 days
26	Eric Harrison	United Australia	Menzies	Minister for Trade and Customs	28 October 1940	29 August 1941	344 days
26	Eric Harrison	United Australia	Fadden	Minister for Trade and Customs	29 August 1941	7 October 1941	344 days
27	Richard Keane	Labor	Curtin	Minister for Trade and Customs	7 October 1941	6 July 1945	4 years, 201 days
27	Richard Keane	Labor	Forde	Minister for Trade and Customs	6 July 1945	13 July 1945	4 years, 201 days
27	Richard Keane	Labor	Chifley	Minister for Trade and Customs	13 July 1945	26 April 1946	4 years, 201 days
28	John Dedman	Labor	Chifley	Minister for Trade and Customs	26 April 1946	18 June 1946	53 days
29	James Fraser	Labor	Chifley	Minister for Trade and Customs	18 June 1946	1 November 1946	136 days
30	Ben Courtice	Labor	Chifley	Minister for Trade and Customs	1 November 1946	19 December 1949	3 years, 184 days
31	Neil O'Sullivan	Liberal	Menzies	Minister for Trade and Customs	19 December 1949	11 January 1956	6 years, 23 days
32	Frederick Osborne	Liberal	Menzies	Minister for Customs and Excise	11 January 1956	24 October 1956	287 days
33	Denham Henty	Liberal	Menzies	Minister for Customs and Excise	24 October 1956	10 June 1964	7 years, 230 days
34	Ken Anderson	Liberal	Menzies	Minister for Customs and Excise	10 June 1964	26 January 1966	3 years, 263 days
34	Ken Anderson	Liberal	Holt	Minister for Customs and Excise	26 January 1966	19 December 1967	3 years, 263 days
34	Ken Anderson	Liberal	McEwen	Minister for Customs and Excise	19 December 1967	10 January 1968	3 years, 263 days
34	Ken Anderson	Liberal	Gorton	Minister for Customs and Excise	10 January 1968	28 February 1968	3 years, 263 days
35	Malcolm Scott	Liberal	Gorton	Minister for Customs and Excise	28 February 1968	12 November 1969	1 year, 257 days
36	Don Chipp	Liberal	Gorton	Minister for Customs and Excise	12 November 1969	10 March 1971	3 years, 23 days
36	Don Chipp	Liberal	McMahon	Minister for Customs and Excise	10 March 1971	5 December 1972	3 years, 23 days
37	Gough Whitlam^{1}	Labor	Whitlam	Minister for Customs and Excise	5 December 1972	19 December 1972	14 days
38	Lionel Murphy	Labor	Whitlam	Minister for Customs and Excise	19 December 1972	10 February 1975	2 years, 53 days
39	Kep Enderby	Labor	Whitlam	Minister for Customs and Excise	10 February 1975	27 March 1975	116 days
39	Kep Enderby	Labor	Whitlam	Minister for Police and Customs	27 March 1975	6 June 1975	116 days
40	Jim Cavanagh	Labor	Whitlam	Minister for Police and Customs	6 June 1975	11 November 1975	158 days
41	Ivor Greenwood	Liberal	Fraser	Minister for Police and Customs	11 November 1975	22 December 1975	41 days
42	John Howard	Liberal	Fraser	Minister for Business and Consumer Affairs	22 December 1975	17 July 1977	1 year, 207 days
43	Wal Fife	Liberal	Fraser	Minister for Business and Consumer Affairs	17 July 1977	8 December 1979	2 years, 144 days
44	Victor Garland	Liberal	Fraser	Minister for Business and Consumer Affairs	8 December 1979	3 November 1980	331 days
45	John Moore	Liberal	Fraser	Minister for Business and Consumer Affairs	3 November 1980	20 April 1982	1 year, 168 days
46	Neil Brown	Liberal	Fraser	Minister for Business and Consumer Affairs	20 April 1982	7 May 1982	17 days
47	Phillip Lynch	Liberal	Fraser	Minister for Industry and Commerce	7 May 1982	11 October 1982	157 days
48	Andrew Peacock	Liberal	Fraser	Minister for Industry and Commerce	11 October 1982	11 March 1983	151 days
49	John Button	Labor	Hawke	Minister for Industry and Commerce	11 March 1983	13 December 1984	4 years, 314 days
49	John Button	Labor	Hawke	Minister for Industry, Technology and Commerce	13 December 1984	19 January 1988	4 years, 314 days
50	Barry Jones	Labor	Hawke	Minister for Science, Customs and Small Business	19 January 1988	4 April 1990	7 years, 24 days
51	David Beddall	Labor	Hawke	Minister for Small Business and Customs	4 April 1990	20 December 1991	2 years, 354 days
51	David Beddall	Labor	Keating	Minister for Small Business and Customs	20 December 1991	27 December 1991	2 years, 354 days
51	David Beddall	Labor	Keating	Minister for Small Business, Construction and Customs	27 December 1991	24 March 1993	2 years, 354 days
52	Alan Griffiths	Labor	Keating	Minister for Industry, Technology and Regional Development	24 March 1993	23 January 1994	305 days
53	Peter Cook	Labor	Keating	Minister for Industry, Technology and Regional Development	30 January 1994	25 March 1994	61 days
54	Chris Schacht	Labor	Keating	Minister for Small Business, Customs and Construction	25 March 1994	11 March 1996	1 year, 352 days
55	Geoff Prosser	Liberal	Howard	Minister for Small Business and Consumer Affairs	11 March 1996	18 July 1997	1 year, 129 days
56	Chris Ellison	Liberal	Howard	Minister for Customs and Consumer Affairs	18 July 1997	9 October 1997	83 days
57	Warren Truss	Nationals	Howard	Minister for Customs and Consumer Affairs	9 October 1997	21 October 1998	1 year, 12 days
58	Amanda Vanstone	Liberal	Howard	Minister for Justice and Customs	21 October 1998	30 January 2001	2 years, 101 days
59	Chris Ellison	Liberal	Howard	Minister for Justice and Customs	30 January 2001	9 March 2007	6 years, 38 days
60	David Johnston	Liberal	Howard	Minister for Justice and Customs	9 March 2007	3 December 2007	269 days
61	Bob Debus	Labor	Rudd	Minister for Home Affairs	3 December 2007	9 June 2009	1 year, 188 days
62	Brendan O'Connor	Labor	Rudd	Minister for Home Affairs	9 June 2009	24 June 2010	2 years, 188 days
62	Brendan O'Connor	Labor	Gillard	Minister for Home Affairs	24 June 2010	14 December 2011	2 years, 188 days
63	Jason Clare	Labor	Gillard	Minister for Home Affairs	14 December 2011	27 June 2013	1 year, 278 days
63	Jason Clare	Labor	Rudd	Minister for Home Affairs	27 June 2013	18 September 2013	1 year, 278 days
64	Scott Morrison	Liberal	Abbott	Minister for Immigration and Border Protection	18 September 2013	23 December 2014	1 year, 96 days
65	Peter Dutton	Liberal	Abbott	Minister for Immigration and Border Protection	23 December 2014	15 September 2015	3 years, 241 days
65	Peter Dutton	Liberal	Turnbull	Minister for Immigration and Border Protection	15 September 2015	21 August 2018	3 years, 241 days

Notes

^{1} Whitlam was one of a two-man ministry consisting of himself and Lance Barnard for two weeks until the full ministry was announced.

== Assistant ministers ==
The following individuals have been appointed as Assistant Minister for Home Affairs, or any of its related titles:

Order	Minister	Party	Prime Minister	Title	Term start	Term end	Term in office
1	Michaelia Cash	Liberal	Abbott	Assistant Minister for Immigration and Border Protection	18 September 2013	15 September 2015	2 years, 3 days
1	Michaelia Cash	Liberal	Turnbull	Assistant Minister for Immigration and Border Protection	15 September 2015	21 September 2015	2 years, 3 days
2	James McGrath	Liberal	Turnbull	Assistant Minister for Immigration and Border Protection	18 February 2016	18 July 2016	151 days
3	Alex Hawke	Liberal	Turnbull	Assistant Minister for Immigration and Border Protection	19 July 2016	20 December 2017	2 years, 40 days
3	Alex Hawke	Liberal	Turnbull	Assistant Minister for Home Affairs	20 December 2017	28 August 2018	2 years, 40 days
4	Linda Reynolds CSC	Liberal	Morrison	Assistant Minister for Home Affairs	28 August 2018	2 March 2019	186 days
5	Jason Wood	Liberal	Morrison	Assistant Minister for Customs, Community Safety and Multicultural Affairs	29 May 2019	23 May 2022	2 years, 359 days
6	Julian Hill	Labor	Albanese	Assistant Minister for Citizenship, Customs and Multicultural Affairs	13 May 2025	incumbent	1 year, 187 days

== See also ==
- Department of Home Affairs (1901–16)
- Department of Home and Territories (1916–1928)
- Department of Home Affairs (1928–32)
- Department of the Interior (1932–39)
- Department of the Interior (1939–72)
- Department of Home Affairs (1977–80)
- Department of Home Affairs and Environment (1980–84)
- Department of Home Affairs (2017–present)
