= George Lawson (Australian politician) =

Australian trade union official (1880–1966)

The Honourable George Lawson
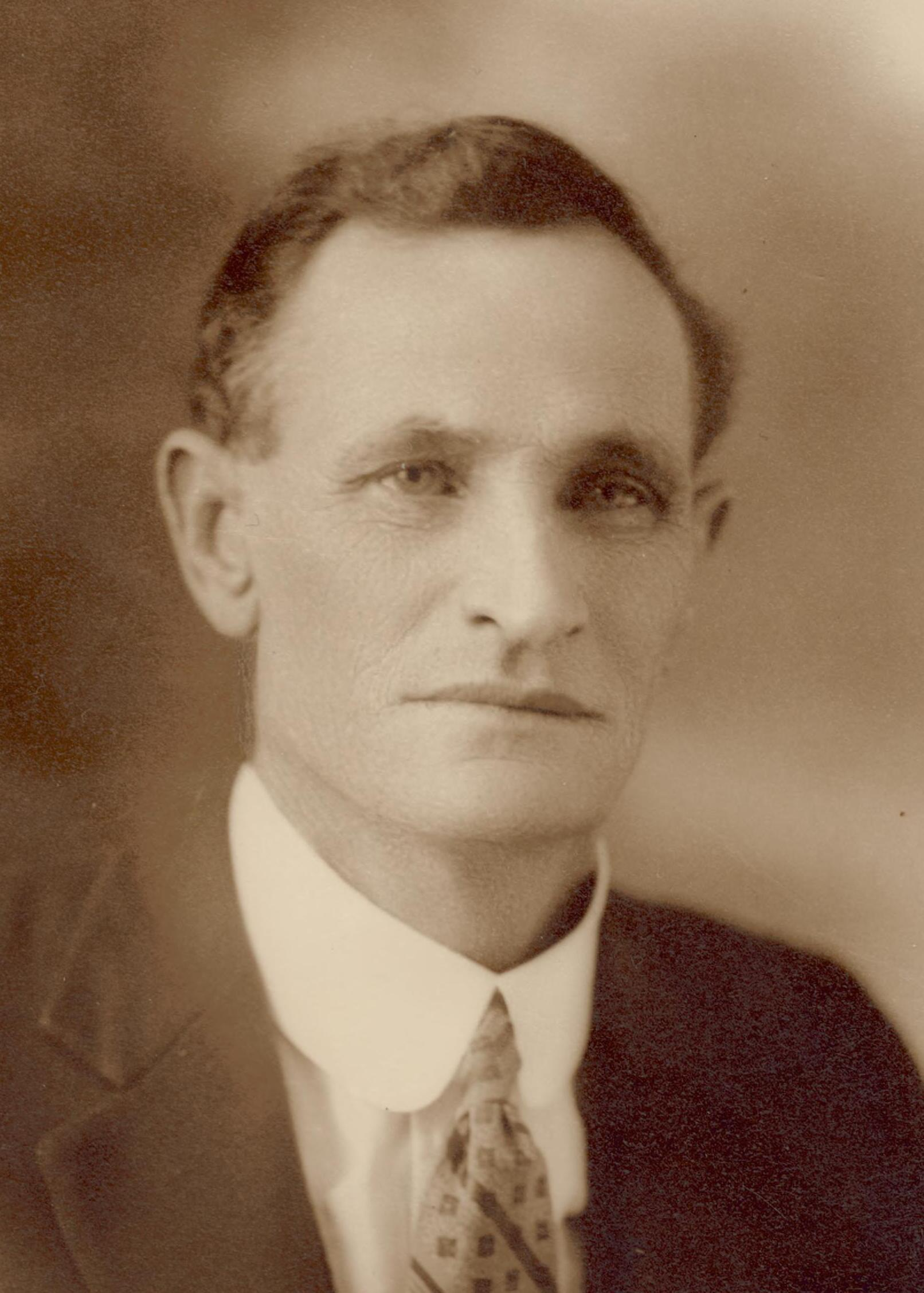

Minister for Transport
- In office 7 October 1941 – 21 September 1943
- Prime Minister: John Curtin
- Preceded by: Hubert Anthony
- Succeeded by: Eddie Ward

Member of the Australian Parliament for Brisbane
- In office 19 December 1931 – 2 November 1961
- Preceded by: Donald Cameron
- Succeeded by: Manfred Cross

Member of the Queensland Legislative Council
- In office 18 August 1919 – 23 March 1922

Personal details
- Born: George Lawson; 14 August 1880 South Pine River, Queensland
- Died: 25 November 1966 (aged 86) Ashgrove, Queensland
- Resting place: Pinnaroo Cemetery
- Party: Labor
- Spouse(s): Rebecca Buchanan (m. 1907; died 1918) Kathleen Lally (m. 1930)
- Occupation: Trade union organizer

George Lawson (14 August 1880 – 25 November 1966) was an Australian trade union official and politician. He was a member of the Australian Labor Party (ALP) and served as a member of the House of Representatives from 1931 to 1961, representing the seat of Brisbane. He was Minister for Transport in the Curtin government from 1941 to 1943. He had a long involvement in the labour movement in Queensland.

== Early life ==
Lawson was born on 14 August 1880 in the South Pine River district near Caboolture, Queensland. He was the eighth child born to Irish immigrant parents Ellen (née Rilley) and Alexander Lawson; his father was a farmer.

Lawson was educated at the state school at Warner and subsequently worked as a carrier for a Brisbane firm. He served in the Boer War from 1901 to 1902 with the 5th (Queensland Imperial Bushmen) Contingent and was mentioned in dispatches.

== Labour movement ==
In 1907, Lawson helped establish the Brisbane Trolleymen, Draymen and Carters' Union, becoming its secretary in 1908. The union later became the Carters and Drivers' Union and in 1912 he was elected its general secretary, a position he held for almost twenty years. He served on the strike committee for the 1912 Brisbane general strike and was a long-serving member of the Queensland Trade Union Congress. He was involved with the creation of the amalgamated Trades and Labour Council of Queensland in 1922 and served as president in 1924 and 1927. At the time of his election to the House of Representatives, he was also secretary of the Road Transport Workers' Union.

== Political career ==
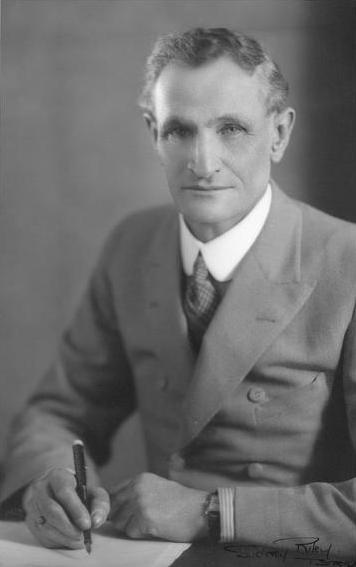
Lawson in the 1930s

Lawson was elected an alderman of the Windsor Town Council from 1916 to 1921 and appointed as an Australian Labor Party member of the Queensland Legislative Council in 1919, and helped bring about its abolition in 1922. He was elected the member for Brisbane in the Australian House of Representatives in the 1931 elections. With the election of the Curtin government in 1941 he became Minister for Transport, but lost his position in the ministry after the 1943 elections. After Labor's defeat in 1949 elections, he was a strong supporter of H. V. Evatt and opponent of both communists and groupers.

== Personal life ==
In 1907, Lawson married Rebecca Buchanan, with whom he had two sons. He was widowed in 1918 and remarried in 1935 to Kathleen Lally.

Lawson retired from parliament in 1961. He died at his home in the Brisbane suburb of Ashgrove in 1966 and was buried in Pinnaroo Cemetery.

== Notes ==
Political offices
Preceded by Hubert Lawrence Anthony	Minister for Transport; 1941–1943	Succeeded by Eddie Ward
Parliament of Australia
Preceded by Donald Charles Cameron	Member for Brisbane; 1931–1961	Succeeded by Manfred Cross
