= Frank Murphy (public servant) =

Australian public servant (1893–1949)

Frank Murphy CMG

Secretary of the Department of Commerce
- In office 17 December 1934 – 21 Dec 1942

Secretary of the Department of Transport
- In office 1 July 1941 – 31 October 1943

Secretary of the Department of Commerce and Agriculture
- In office 22 December 1942 – 20 November 1945

Personal details
- Born: James Francis Murphy; 12 March 1893 Carlton, Melbourne, Victoria
- Died: 18 January 1949 (aged 55) Balwyn, Melbourne, Victoria
- Resting place: Melbourne general cemetery
- Occupation: Public servant

James Francis Murphy CMG (12 March 1893 – 18 January 1949) was a senior Australian public servant, best known for his role as Secretary of the Department of Commerce (later Department of Commerce and Agriculture) in the 1930s and 1940s.

== Life and career ==
Frank Murphy was born in Carlton, Melbourne on 12 March 1893. In 1910, he joined the Commonwealth Public Service in the Department of External Affairs.

In 1933, Murphy was appointed as Assistant Secretary to the Department of Commerce—his promotion at the time was challenged by several other public servants who believed that they should win the role on the grounds that they had served for longer.

From December 1934 when he was appointed to the position, until December 1942 when the Department was abolished, Murphy was Secretary of the Department of Commerce. He was then appointed Secretary of the Department of Commerce and Agriculture, between 1942 and 1945.

Between 1941 and 1943, Murphy was also Secretary of the Department of Transport. In the role he did not participate in the detailed work of the department as his focus was on the commerce department.

Murphy died on 18 January 1949 in Balwyn, Melbourne.

== Awards ==
In May 1937, Murphy was appointed a Companion of the Order of St Michael and St George, for his service as Secretary of the Department of Commerce.

Government offices
Preceded by Edward Joseph Mulvany	Secretary of the Department of Commerce; 1934 – 1942	Succeeded by Himself as Secretary of the Department of Commerce and Agriculture
Preceded by Joseph Carrodus as Secretary of the Department of the Interior	Secretary of the Department of Transport; 1941 – 1943	Succeeded by Richard John Murphy
Preceded by Himself as Secretary of the Department of Commerce	Secretary of the Department of Transport; 1941 – 1943	Succeeded by Richard John Murphy
Preceded by Himself as Secretary of the Department of Commerce	Secretary of the Department of Commerce and Agriculture; 1942 – 1945	Succeeded by Edwin McCarthy
