= Department of Works (1938–39) =

Australian government department, 1938–1939

Department overview
- Formed: 24 November 1938
- Preceding Department: Department of the Interior (I)
- Dissolved: 26 April 1939
- Superseding Department: Department of the Interior (II)
- Jurisdiction: Commonwealth of Australia
- Headquarters: Canberra
- Minister responsible: Harold Thorby, Minister
- Department executive: Maurice Mehaffy, Director-General

The Department of Works was an Australian government department that existed between November 1938 and April 1939.

== Scope ==
Information about the department's functions and government funding allocation could be found in the Administrative Arrangements Orders and in the Department's annual report.

According to the Administrative Arrangements Order issued on 6 April 1939, the Department dealt with:

- Geodesy (international map of the world and 129th meridian)
- Lands and surveys
- Properties transferred, acquired and rented
- Public works and services
- Preparation of design and execution of all Commonwealth architectural and engineering works in the states
- Northern Territory and ACT, including works for the Commonwealth Bank of Australia
- Maintenance and operation of electric light, water and sewerage services in the ACT
- Rivers, roads and bridges
- River Murray Waters Commission

== Structure ==
The Department was a Commonwealth Public Service department, staffed by officials who were responsible to the Minister for Works.
