= Archdale Parkhill =

Australian politician

The Honourable Sir Archdale Parkhill KCMG
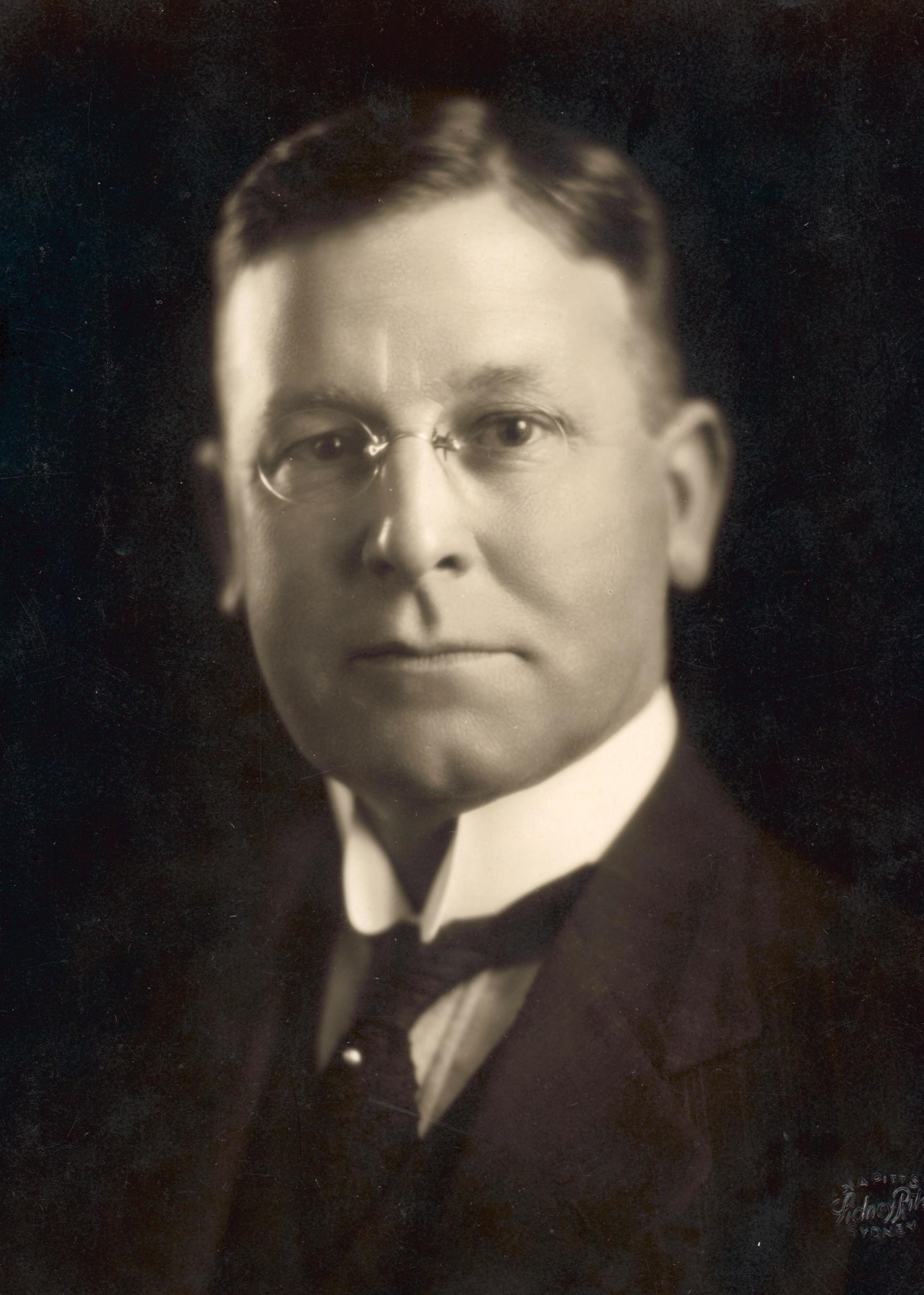

Minister for Defence
- In office 12 October 1934 – 20 November 1937
- Prime Minister: Joseph Lyons
- Preceded by: Sir George Pearce
- Succeeded by: Harold Thorby

Postmaster-General of Australia
- In office 13 October 1932 – 12 October 1934
- Prime Minister: Joseph Lyons
- Preceded by: James Fenton
- Succeeded by: Alexander McLachlan

Minister for the Interior
- In office 12 April 1932 – 13 October 1932
- Prime Minister: Joseph Lyons
- Preceded by: (new title)
- Succeeded by: John Perkins

Minister for Home Affairs Minister for Transport
- In office 6 January 1932 – 12 April 1932
- Prime Minister: Joseph Lyons
- Preceded by: Arthur Blakeley (Home Affairs); Parker Moloney (Transport)
- Succeeded by: (abolished)

Member of the Australian Parliament for Warringah
- In office 21 May 1927 – 23 October 1937
- Preceded by: Granville Ryrie
- Succeeded by: Percy Spender

Personal details
- Born: 27 August 1878 Paddington, New South Wales, Australia
- Died: 2 October 1947 (aged 69) Sydney, Australia
- Party: Liberal (1909–17); Nationalist (1917–31); UAP (1931–37)
- Spouse: Florence Ruth Watts
- Occupation: Alderman

Sir Robert Archdale "Archie" Parkhill KCMG (27 August 1878 – 2 October 1947) was an Australian politician who was a member of the House of Representatives from 1927 to 1937. He began his career in politics as a campaign director for the Commonwealth Liberal Party and Nationalist Party. He later joined the new United Australia Party in 1931, and served as a minister in the Lyons government between 1932 and 1937.

== Early life ==
Parkhill was born on 27 August 1878 in Paddington, New South Wales. He was the son of Isabella (née Chisholm) and Robert Parkhill, his father being a stonemason. He was educated at public schools in Paddington and Waverley before finding work as a clerk. In 1904, Parkhill was elected to the Waverley Municipal Council. In the same year, he was appointed secretary of the Liberal and Reform Association. He married Florence Ruth Watts on 9 May 1906.

== Party politics ==
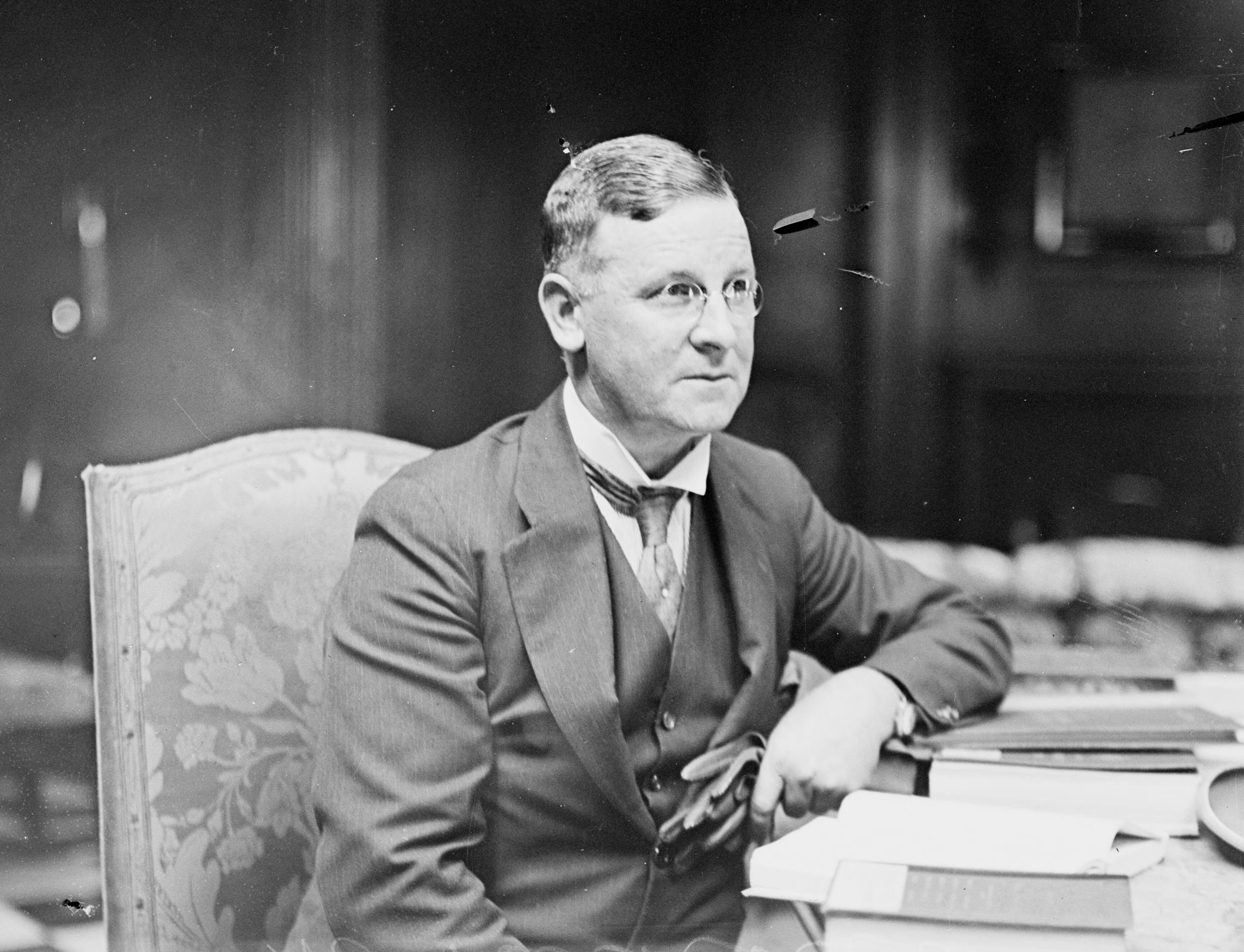
Parkhill sitting at his desk

In July 1909 Parkhill was chosen as secretary of the newly formed New South Wales Federal Liberal League. The new organisation was formed to support the parliamentary "Fusion" Liberal Party formed by Alfred Deakin and Joseph Cook. Influenced by his mentor Joseph Carruthers, Parkhill made the Liberal Party and its successor the Nationalist Party, extremely efficient political machines. He directed nineteen Federal and State election and referendum campaigns between 1904 and 1928, presiding over the introduction of new campaign techniques such as film and radio. Despite his professionalism, he was also unscrupulous, being sued for libel in 1914. His most successful campaign was for the 1925 Federal election, when he combined fear of Bolshevism, with which the opposition Labor Party was sometimes associated, with traditional Australian aspirations of home ownership.

Due to his considerable success and efficiency, Parkhill became a national figure, and was closely involved in the formation of the Nationalist Party after the split in the Labor Party due to the issue of conscription in 1916. He became closely associated with Prime Minister Billy Hughes, who had led the Labor split, and was the central figure in the organisation of the Nationalist Party under both Hughes and his successor, Stanley Bruce. In this capacity, he served as secretary of the Australian National Federation. In another role, as secretary of the New South Wales Consultative Council from 1919 to 1929, he organised fund-raising for the ANF's Victorian equivalent, the National Union.

== Federal politics ==
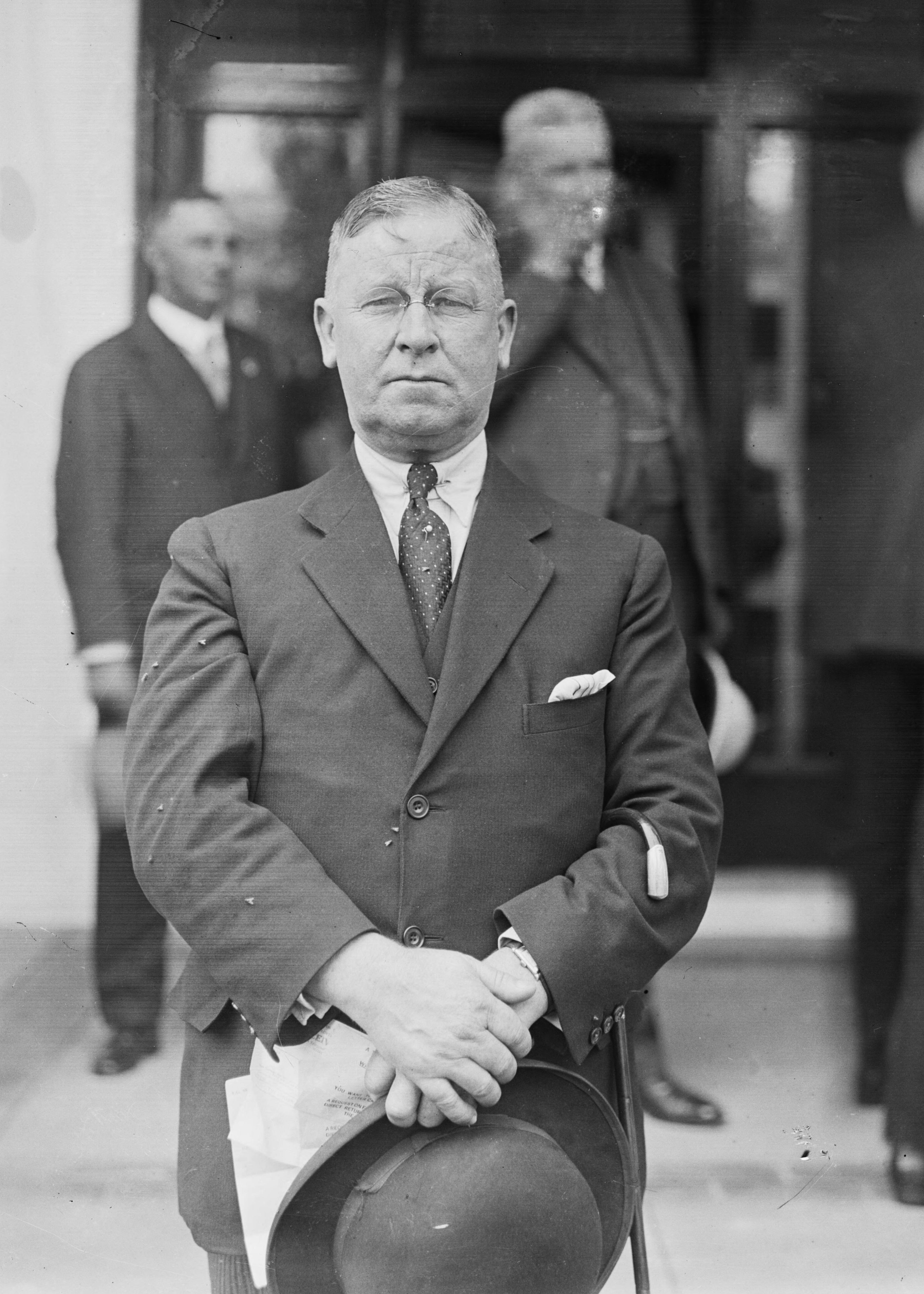
Parkhill in 1932

In 1922 Parkhill was persuaded to surrender his candidacy for the safe Nationalist seat of North Sydney to Hughes, but was able to enter Parliament via the equally safe seat of Warringah at a by-election following the retirement of Sir Granville Ryrie in 1927. His ministerial ambitions were suspended when the Government lost the 1929 election, although he became prominent in the ensuing Opposition under the leadership of John Latham. He was instrumental in reviving Nationalist morale, which was partly responsible for the implosion of Labor Prime Minister James Scullin's government.

=== Government minister ===
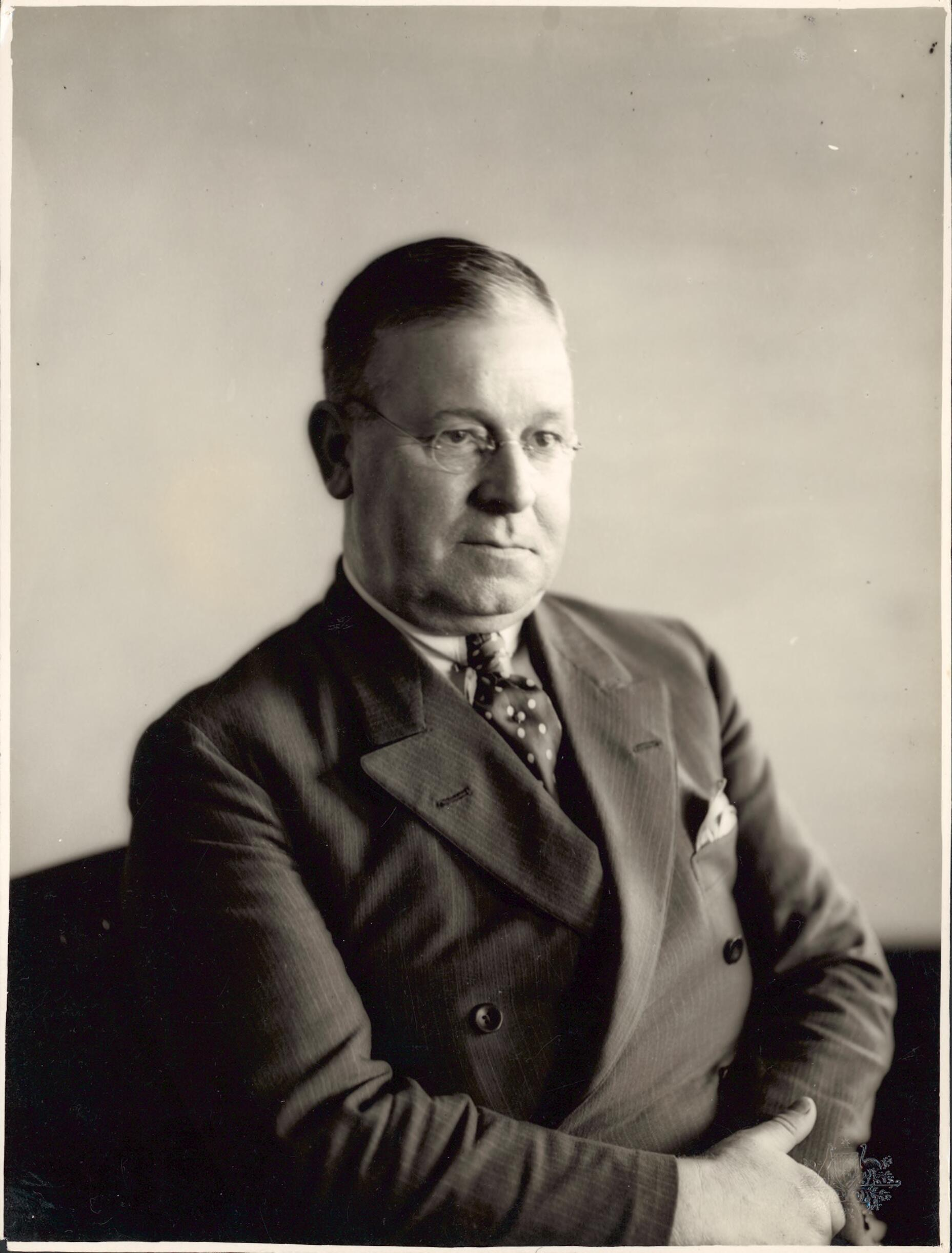
Parkhill as Minister for Home Affairs and Transport

Parkhill, who was deeply attached to the Nationalist Party (going so far as to call it his "Nicene Creed"), was not enthusiastic about the formation of the United Australia Party, successor to the Nationalist Party, under Labor defector Joseph Lyons. He described it as a "party of spare parts"; nevertheless, when the party won the 1931 election, Parkhill was appointed Minister for Home Affairs and Minister for Transport in January 1932. In April 1932, he became Minister for the Interior, which replaced the portfolios of Home Affairs and Transport. In October 1932, he lost the interior portfolio, but gained the position of Postmaster-General. By 1934 he was a member of the Cabinet and was third only to Lyons and Latham in the government, often serving as acting Prime Minister. By now, he had become one of Lyons's strongest supporters.

As Minister for Defence (1934–1937), Parkhill cultivated a bipartisan approach, but his selection of an American model of aircraft for the Commonwealth Aircraft Corporation, which he had established, cost him support within the party. He was defeated by Robert Menzies for the deputy leadership of the United Australia Party in December 1935, but was nevertheless the leader of the Australian delegation to King George VI's coronation in 1937. However, he was defeated in the 1937 election by "independent UAP" candidate Percy Spender on preferences, and, shocked, refused to shake hands after the poll.

== Later life ==
Parkhill joined a number of company boards after his electoral defeat and considered re-contesting Warringah, but the success of Spender destroyed his hopes. Despite persistent rumours, he never returned to public life, and attacked Menzies' wartime leadership as "tragic". He died at St Luke's Hospital in Sydney in 1947 and was buried in Waverley Cemetery, survived by his wife, a son and a daughter.

== Legacy ==
Parkhill was regarded as the leader of the conservative faction of the party, being extremely conservative morally and socially, and lent his support to free trade. His reputation as a dandy, partly due to his famous propensity to be over-dressed, led to nicknames including "Archduke", "Sir Spats", "Sir Kewpie" and "Perky". He always aspired to be Prime Minister, and his defeat for deputy party leader was a personal blow to Joseph Lyons. He is held partly responsible for the revival of the parties opposed to Labor in the 1930s, and for his effective defence policy.

Political offices
| Preceded by Arthur Blakeley | Minister for Home Affairs; 1932 | Replaced by Interior portfolio |
| Preceded by Parker Moloney | Minister for Transport; 1932 | Replaced by Interior portfolio |
| New title Replacing Home Affairs and Transport portfolios | Minister for the Interior; 1932 | Succeeded by John Perkins |
| Preceded by James Fenton | Postmaster-General; 1932–1934 | Succeeded by Alexander McLachlan |
| Preceded by George Pearce | Minister for Defence; 1934–1937 | Succeeded by Joseph Lyons |
Parliament of Australia
| Preceded by Granville Ryrie | Member for Warringah; 1927–1937 | Succeeded by Percy Spender |
