= Department of Transport (1941–1950) =

Australian government department, 1941–1950

Department overview
- Formed: 26 June 1941
- Preceding agencies: Department of the Interior – for financial assistance to the states for roads and works; Department of Commerce – for transport research
- Dissolved: 16 March 1950
- Superseding Department: Department of Fuel, Shipping and Transport
- Jurisdiction: Commonwealth of Australia
- Headquarters: Canberra
- Department executives: Frank Murphy, Secretary (1941–1943); Richard John Murphy, Secretary (1943–1948); A.W. Paul, Secretary (1948–1950)

The Department of Transport was an Australian government department that existed between June 1941 and March 1950.

The department was created after Prime Minister Robert Menzies announced that, due to the war position, it was essential for a Commonwealth executive authority to be established to address both road and rail internal transport problems. It was established by an Administrative Arrangements Order made on 26 June 1941, the order also established the Department of Aircraft Production, the Department of War Organization of Industry, the Department of Home Security and the Department of External Territories.
