= Edwin McCarthy =

Australian public servant and diplomat

Sir Edwin McCarthy CBE
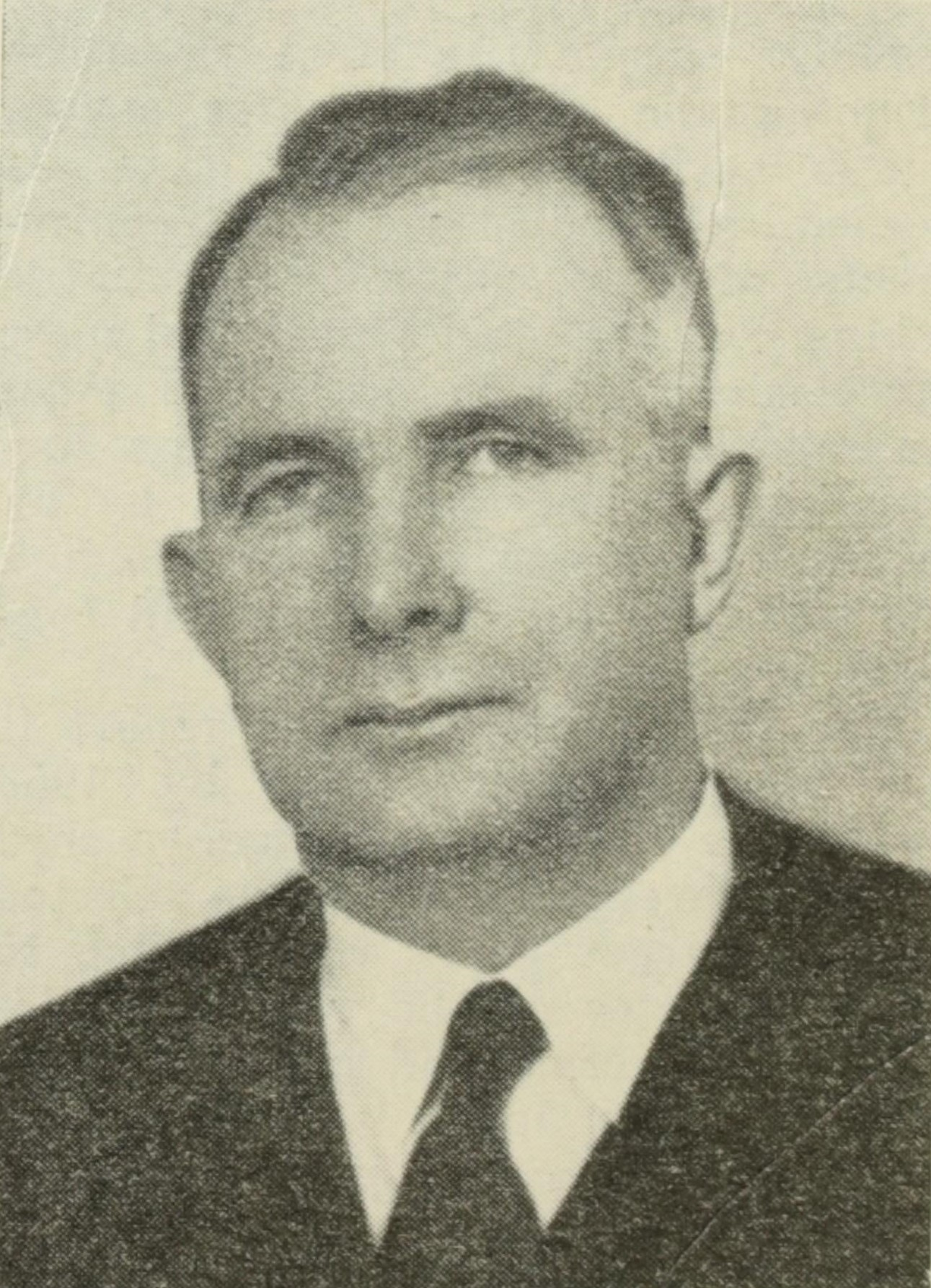

Secretary of the Department of Commerce and Agriculture
- In office 21 November 1945 – 26 April 1950

Personal details
- Born: Edwin McCarthy; 30 March 1896 Walhalla, Victoria, Australia
- Died: 4 September 1980 (aged 84) Woden Valley Hospital, Garran, Canberra, Australia
- Resting place: Gungahlin Cemetery
- Spouse: Marjorie Mary Graham (m. 1939)
- Children: John McCarthy, Melisande McCarthy
- Occupation: Public servant

Sir Edwin McCarthy CBE (30 March 1896 – 4 September 1980) was a senior Australian public servant and diplomat. He was a prominent senior trade official, including as head of the Department of Commerce and Agriculture between 1945 and 1950.

== Life and career ==
McCarthy was born in Walhalla, Victoria on 30 March 1896 to parents Catherine McCarthy (née Kennedy) and Daniel McCarthy.

He joined the Commonwealth Public Service as a messenger in the Postmaster-General's Department in April 1911.

McCarthy married Marjorie Mary Graham on 4 July 1939 in Sydney. The couple had two children: a daughter, and a son, John McCarthy.

From 1945 to 1950, McCarthy was Secretary of the Department of Commerce and Agriculture. His primary expertise was grain commodity matters, and he devised the Australian wheat price stabilisation scheme after World War II.

Between 1958 and 1962, McCarthy was Australian Ambassador to the Netherlands. He was accredited to Belgium also, from 1959.

In 1962, McCarthy was appointed Head of the Australian Permanent Mission to the European Atomic Energy Community in Brussels.

McCarthy died on 4 September 1980 at Woden Valley Hospital in Garran, Canberra. He had been admitted earlier within the same week after a brain aneurysm.

== Awards ==
McCarthy was appointed a Commander of the Order of the British Empire in June 1952, while serving as Deputy High Commissioner in London. He was made a Knight Bachelor in June 1955, whilst serving in the same role.

Government offices
Preceded by Frank Murphy	Secretary of the Department of Commerce and Agriculture; 1945 – 1950	Succeeded by John Crawford
Diplomatic posts
Preceded by Hugh McClure Smith	Australian Ambassador to the Netherlands; 1958 – 1962	Succeeded by Walter Crocker
