= Herbert Charles Brown (public servant) =

Australian public servant

Herbert Charles Brown CBE

Secretary of the Department of Markets
- In office August 1928 – 10 December 1928

Secretary of the Department of Markets and Transport
- In office 10 December 1928 – 21 April 1930

Secretary of the Department of Transport
- In office 1 May 1930 – 12 April 1932

Secretary of the Department of the Interior
- In office 12 April 1932 – 1935

Commonwealth Auditor-General
- In office 1935–1938

Personal details
- Born: 1874
- Died: 16 July 1940 (aged 67)
- Occupation: Public servant

Herbert Charles Brown CBE (1874–1940) was a senior Australian public servant best known for his time as Commonwealth Auditor-General in the late 1930s.

== Life and career ==
Brown was born in 1874, and joined the New South Wales public service in 1891.

Brown served for 12-years in the Postmaster-General's Department, before joining the Department of Home Affairs. He then became an Assistant Secretary in the Department of Works and Railways, then a chief clerk and accountant in the Prime Minister's Department.

In 1928, Brown was appointed Secretary of the Department of Markets. He became Secretary of the expanded Department of Markets and Transport at the end of that year.

Brown was Secretary of the Department of Transport between 1930 and 1932. His salary was initially set at £1,100 per year, and his responsibilities included Commonwealth railways, assisted Migration from Britain, and lighthouses, light ships, beacons and buoys.

When the Department of the Interior was created in 1932, amalgamating the Departments of Home Affairs, Transport and Works and Railways, Brown was appointed to be its head. Having served as head of the Department of the Interior for over three years, Brown was appointed Commonwealth Auditor-General in November 1935.

Brown died on 16 July 1940, aged 67. His death was at home after a short illness.

== Awards ==
Brown was made a Commander of the Order of the British Empire in June 1933 whilst Secretary of the Department of the Interior.

Government offices
Preceded by Edward Joseph Mulvany	Secretary of the Department of Markets; 1928	Succeeded by Himself as Secretary of the Department of Markets and Transport
Preceded by Himself as Secretary of the Department of Markets	Secretary of the Department of Markets and Transport; 1928 – 1930	Succeeded by Edward Joseph Mulvany as Secretary of the Markets
Preceded by Himself as Secretary of the Department of Markets	Secretary of the Department of Markets and Transport; 1928 – 1930	Succeeded by Himself as Secretary of the Department of Transport
Preceded by Himself as Secretary of the Department of Markets and Transport	Secretary of the Department of Transport; 1930 – 1932	Succeeded by Edward Joseph Mulvany as Secretary of the Department of Commerce
Preceded by Himself as Secretary of the Department of Markets and Transport	Secretary of the Department of Transport; 1930 – 1932	Succeeded by Himself as Secretary of the Department of the Interior
Preceded by Himself as Secretary of the Department of Transport	Secretary of the Department of the Interior; 1932 – 1935	Succeeded by Joseph Carrodus
Preceded by Percy Deane as Secretary of the Department of Home Affairs	Secretary of the Department of the Interior; 1932 – 1935	Succeeded by Joseph Carrodus
Preceded by Percival Gourgaud as Secretary of the Department of Works and Railways	Secretary of the Department of the Interior; 1932 – 1935	Succeeded by Joseph Carrodus
Preceded by Charles Cerutty	Commonwealth Auditor-General; 1935 – 1938	Succeeded by Ralph Abercrombie
