= Edward Joseph Mulvany =

Australian public servant (1871–1951)

Edward Joseph Mulvaney ISO

Secretary of the Department of Markets and Migration
- In office 1925–1928

Secretary of the Department of Markets (I)
- In office 1928–1928

Secretary of the Department of Markets (II)
- In office 1930–1932

Secretary of the Department of Commerce
- In office 1932–1934

Personal details
- Born: 17 February 1871 St Kilda, Melbourne
- Died: 7 June 1951 (aged 80) St Kilda, Melbourne
- Resting place: Melbourne general cemetery
- Occupation: Public servant

Edward Joseph Mulvaney ISO (17 February 1871 – 7 June 1951) was a senior Australian public servant, best known for his time heading the Department of Markets and the Department of Commerce.

== Life and career ==
Mulvaney was born in St Kilda, Melbourne on 17 February 1871.

Mulvaney began his career in the public service in the Department of Trade and Customs.

He was the fourth member of the Development and Migration Commission between 1928 and 1930.

In May 1930, Mulvany was appointed Secretary of the Department of Markets. He transitioned to head the Department of Commerce in 1932.

Mulvaney announced his retirement in 1934.

== Awards ==
Mulvaney was made a Companion of the Imperial Service Order in June 1927 for service as Secretary of the Commonwealth Markets Department.

Government offices
Preceded by Robert McKeeman Oakley as Secretary of the Department of Trade and Customs	Secretary of the Department of Markets and Migration; 1925 – 1928	Succeeded by Himself as Secretary of the Department of Markets
Preceded by Percy Deane as Secretary of the Prime Minister's Department	Secretary of the Department of Markets and Migration; 1925 – 1928	Succeeded by Himself as Secretary of the Department of Markets
Preceded by Himself as Secretary of the Department of Markets and Migration	Secretary of the Department of Markets (I); 1928	Succeeded by Herbert Charles Brown
Preceded by Herbert Charles Brown as Secretary of the Department of Markets and Transport	Secretary of the Department of Markets (II); 1930 – 1932	Succeeded by Himself as Secretary of the Department of Commerce
Preceded by Himself as Secretary of the Department of Markets	Secretary of the Department of Commerce; 1932 – 1934	Succeeded by Frank Murphy
