= Thomas Paterson =

Australian politician (1882–1952)

The Honourable Thomas Paterson
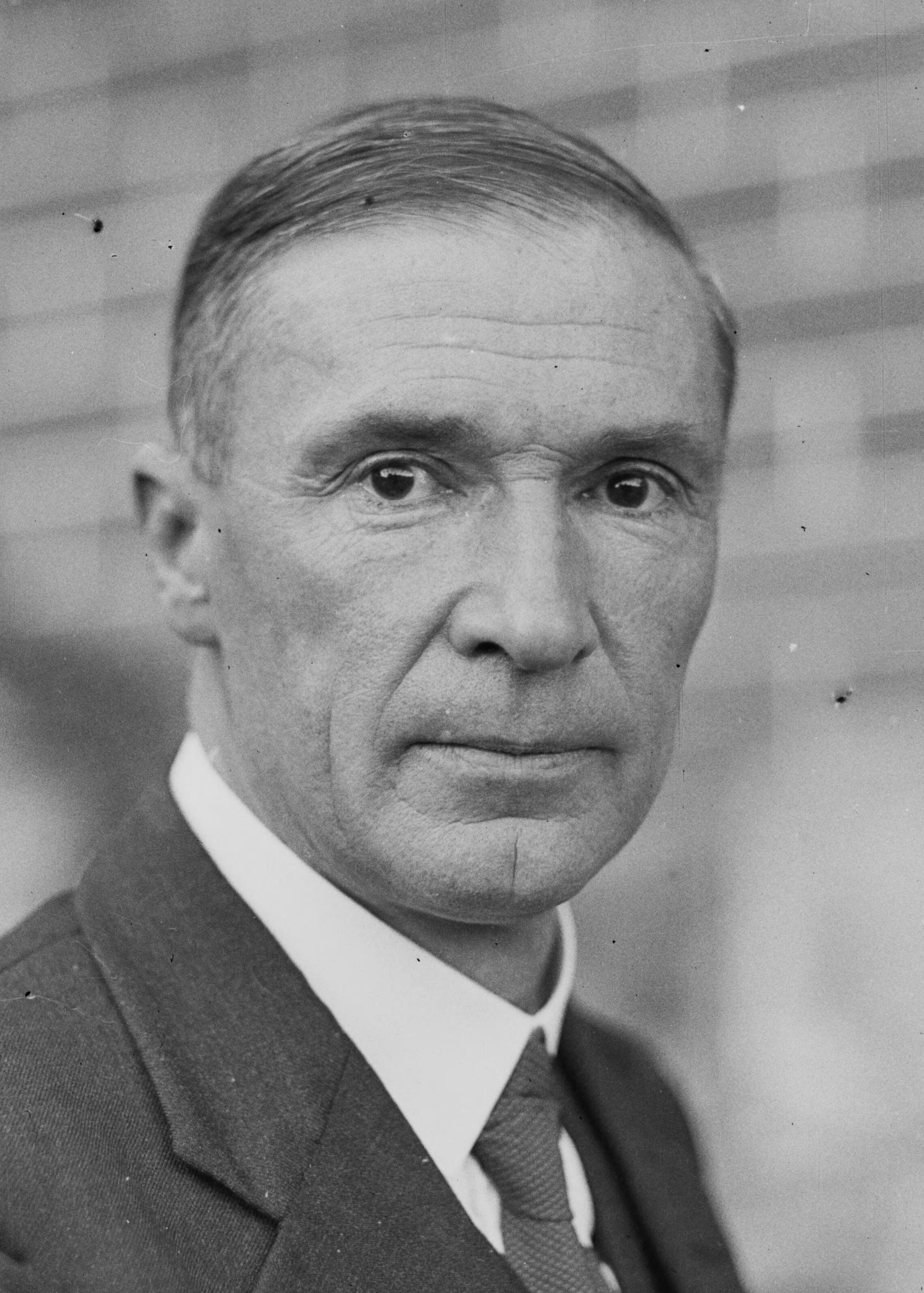

Deputy Leader of the Country Party
- In office 19 November 1929 – 27 November 1937
- Leader: Earle Page
- Preceded by: William Gibson
- Succeeded by: Harold Thorby

Minister for the Interior
- In office 9 November 1934 – 29 November 1937
- Prime Minister: Joseph Lyons
- Preceded by: Eric Harrison
- Succeeded by: John McEwen

Minister for Markets and Transport
- In office 10 December 1928 – 22 October 1929; Minister for Markets: 19 January 1928 – 10 December 1928; Minister for Markets and Migration: 18 June 1926 – 19 January 1928
- Prime Minister: Stanley Bruce
- Preceded by: Victor Wilson
- Succeeded by: Parker Moloney

Member of the Australian Parliament for Gippsland
- In office 16 December 1922 – 7 July 1943
- Preceded by: George Wise
- Succeeded by: George Bowden

Personal details
- Born: 20 November 1882 Aston, Warwickshire, England
- Died: 24 January 1952 (aged 69) McKinnon, Victoria, Australia
- Party: Country
- Spouse: Elsie Jane Tyrrell (m. 1908)
- Occupation: Farmer

Thomas Paterson (20 November 1882 – 24 January 1952) was an Australian politician who served as deputy leader of the Country Party from 1929 to 1937. He held ministerial office in the governments of Stanley Bruce and Joseph Lyons, representing the Division of Gippsland in Victoria from 1922 to 1943. He played a leading role in the creation of the Victorian Country Party as the political arm of the Victorian Farmers' Union.

== Early life ==
Paterson was born on 20 November 1882 in Aston, Birmingham, England. He was the son of Scottish parents Elizabeth Mitchell (née Donald) and George Paterson.

Paterson attended King Edward's School, Birmingham, and Ayr Grammar School in Scotland. He left school after his father's death in 1897 and began working for footwear retailer Morton's, his father's former employer. He worked in England and Scotland as a shoe salesman and branch manager, resigning in 1908 in order to immigrate to Australia. Prior to leaving he worked on a farm and attended the Dairy School in Kilmarnock in order to gain experience in agriculture.

Together with four other family members, Paterson arrived in Melbourne in December 1908. They joined two of his brothers who had previously established a dairy farming property at Springfield, Victoria. The brothers developed a mixed farm on scientific principles, while Paterson also bred Clydesdale horses. He joined the Victorian Farmers' Union in 1916 as a member of the Springfield branch, and was elected vice-president in 1920 and state president in 1922.

== Political career ==
Paterson joined the Victorian Farmers' Union in 1916, became its president in March 1922 and in November 1922 chaired a conference that led to the creation of the Victorian Country Party. He stood unsuccessfully for the Senate in the 1919 elections and for the Victorian Legislative Assembly in 1920 but in 1922 elections he won the federal seat of Gippsland, defeating the Nationalist George Wise. His victory was one of several Country Party gains that forced the Nationalists to go into Coalition with the Country Party in order to stay in office.

In parliament, he campaigned for a subsidy for dairy exports to be paid for by a tax on Australian consumers and known by opponents as "Paterson's Curse" (referring to the Australian name for Echium plantagineum). £20 million were paid under this scheme between 1926 and 1933. Paterson was Minister for Markets and Migration from June 1926 to January 1928, Minister for Markets from January to December 1928 and Minister for Markets and Transport from December 1928 to October 1929. He was deputy leader of the parliamentary Country Party from 1929 to 1937, under Earle Page, and was acting leader for several months in 1933 following the death of Page's son.

He was appointed Minister for the Interior in the Lyons coalition government in November 1934. Also in November 1934 he made an exclusion order against Czech writer Egon Kisch which was later overturned by the High Court. He resigned as minister and deputy party leader after the 1937 elections, as a result of the 1936 controversy over the exclusion from Australia of Mabel Freer, a white British woman born in India, who, under the terms of the 1901 Immigration Restriction Act, had failed a dictation test in Italian.

During his time as Minister for the Interior, Paterson was praised by William Cooper of the Australian Aborigines' League for his goodwill and support of the League's requests for greater government assistance to Aboriginal people.

Paterson remained prominent in Country Party affairs and helped form a breakaway party from the Victorian Country Party that was loyal to the federal parliamentary Country Party in March 1938. He helped reconcile the federal and Victorian parties in 1943, but did not stand for re-election in 1943 elections.

== Personal life ==
Paterson married Elsie Jane Tyrrell in 1908, one day before the couple migrated to Australia. The couple had two sons; their younger son Archibald was a decorated Royal Australian Air Force (RAAF) member but drowned in 1945.

Paterson was an elder in the Presbyterian Church. After leaving politics he served as a director of the Phosphate Cooperative Company of Australia and the Victorian Wheat-Growers' Corporation. He died at his home in McKinnon on 24 January 1952, after an illness of three months. He was granted a state funeral and cremated at Springvale Cemetery.

== Sources ==
- Attwood and Markus (2004) Thinking Black: William Cooper and the Aborigines' Advancement League, Aboriginal Studies Press: Canberra. ISBN 0 85575 459 1.

Political offices
Preceded by Victor Wilson	Minister for Markets and Migration; Minister for Markets; Minister for Markets and Transport; 1928–29	Succeeded by Parker Moloney
Preceded by Eric Harrison	Minister for the Interior; 1934–37	Succeeded by John McEwen
Parliament of Australia
Preceded by George Wise	Member for Gippsland; 1922–43	Succeeded by George Bowden
Party political offices
Preceded by William Gibson	Deputy Leader of the Country Party of Australia; 1929–37	Succeeded by Harold Thorby
