= Bill McLaren (public servant) =

Australian public servant (1898–1973)

Bill McLaren CBE

Secretary of the Department of the Interior
- In office 2 May 1949 – 7 May 1963

Personal details
- Born: William Alexander McLaren; 8 May 1898
- Died: 30 September 1973 (aged 75)
- Spouse(s): Doris Elsie Josephine Brooks (m. 1935–1951; her death); Phyllis Maude Coles (m. 1952–1973; his death)
- Occupation: Public servant

William Alexander McLaren CBE (8 May 1898 – 30 September 1973) was a senior Australian public servant. He was Secretary of the Department of the Interior between 1949 and 1963.

== Life and career ==
Bill McLaren was born in Sydney on 8 May 1898. His parents were William McLaren and Esther May Manning.

He graduated from Sydney University.

McLaren moved to Canberra in 1945 into the Australian Public Service as the Commonwealth Director of War Service Land Settlement.

Between 1949 and 1963, McLaren was Secretary of the Department of the Interior.

McLaren died on 30 September 1970.

== Awards ==
McLaren was made a Commander of the Order of the British Empire in 1954.

Government offices
Preceded by Joseph Carrodus	Secretary of the Department of the Interior; 1949 – 1963	Succeeded by Richard Kingsland
