= Department of Markets and Migration =

Australian government department, 1925–1928

Department of Markets
Department overview
- Formed: 16 January 1925
- Preceding Department: Department of Trade and Customs – for the Commerce Branch Prime Minister's Department – for the Immigration Office
- Dissolved: 19 January 1928
- Superseding Department: Department of Markets (I)
- Jurisdiction: Commonwealth of Australia
- Headquarters: Melbourne
- Ministers responsible: Victor Wilson, Minister (1925–1926); Thomas Paterson, Minister (1926–1928)
- Department executive: Edward Joseph Mulvaney, Secretary

The Department of Markets and Migration was an Australian government department that existed between January 1925 and January 1928.

== History ==
The Department of Markets and Migration was created to bring together Commonwealth activities that had previously been scattered across several different agencies.

== Scope ==
Information about the department's functions and government funding allocation could be found in the Administrative Arrangements Orders, the annual Portfolio Budget Statements and in the department's annual reports.

The department dealt with dealt with all matters connected with the marketing of Australian products overseas, including dairy produce, canned fruits, dried fruits, fresh fruits, meat, eggs and pearl-shell. It also handled the following matters:

- The collection and dissemination of commercial and industrial information
- Financial assistance in connection with citrus fruits, canned fruits, Ohanez grapes, broom millet, hops, and other products; trade publicity and advertising overseas
- The British Empire Exhibition and exhibitions generally
- Advances to State Governments for the purchase of wire netting by settlers; rural credits
- Inter-Imperial trade matters

== Structure ==
The department was a Commonwealth Public Service department, staffed by officials who were responsible to the Minister for Markets and Migration, initially Victor Wilson (until 18 June 1926) and then Thomas Paterson.

The Department's Secretary was Edward Joseph Mulvany.
