= 1927 Warringah by-election =

21 May 1927
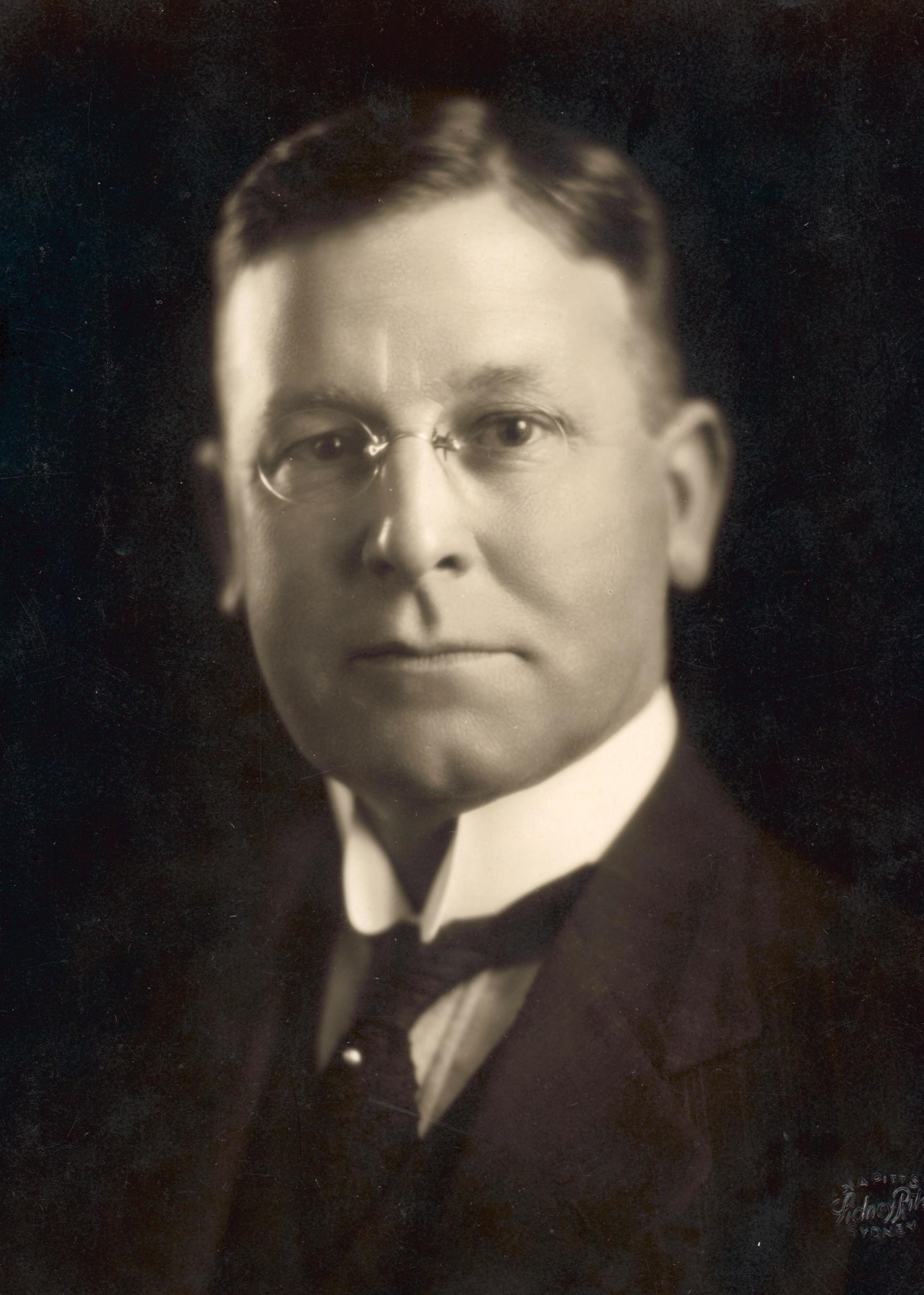
	First party	Second party	Third party
		NAT	ALP
Candidate	Archdale Parkhill	William Fell	Ambrose O'Gorman
Party	Nationalist	Independent Nationalist	Labor
Popular vote	22,583	7,477	4,285
Percentage	55.8%	18.5%	10.6%
Swing	▼24.3pp	▲18.5pp	▼1.5pp
TPP	69.6%		30.4%
TPP swing	▼10.5pp		▲10.5pp
MP before election
Granville Ryrie
Nationalist
Elected MP
Archdale Parkhill
Nationalist

A by-election was held for the Australian House of Representatives seat of Warringah on 21 May 1927. This was triggered by the resignation of Nationalist MP Sir Granville Ryrie to become Australian High Commissioner to the United Kingdom.

The by-election was won by Nationalist candidate Archdale Parkhill.

== Results ==
1927 Warringah by-election
Party	Candidate	Votes	%	±%
Nationalist	Archdale Parkhill	22,583	55.8	−24.3
Ind. Nationalist	William Fell	7,477	18.5	+18.5
Labor	Ambrose O'Gorman	4,285	10.6	−1.5
Labor	Thomas Conway	3,159	7.8	+7.8
Constitutionalist	Thomas Roberts	2,990	7.4	+7.4
Total formal votes		40,494	97.8	
Informal votes		928	2.2	
Turnout		41,422	88.4	
Two-party-preferred result
Nationalist	Archdale Parkhill		69.6	−10.5
Labor	Ambrose O'Gorman		30.4	+10.5
Nationalist hold		Swing	−10.5	
