= Department of Commerce and Agriculture =

Disbanded Australian government department

Department overview
- Formed: 22 December 1942
- Preceding Department: Department of Post-War Reconstruction – for Bureau of Agricultural Economics, Fisheries Division Department of Supply and Shipping – for jute and flax production Department of Commerce – for trade and agriculture
- Dissolved: 11 January 1956
- Superseding Department: Department of Primary Industry (I) – for agricultural and pastoral industries and fisheries Department of Trade (I) – for trade promotion, policy treaties, investigations
- Jurisdiction: Commonwealth of Australia
- Headquarters: Barton, Canberra
- Ministers responsible: William Scully, Minister (1942–1946); Reg Pollard, Minister (1946–1949); John McEwen, Minister (1949–1956)
- Department executives: Frank Murphy, Secretary (1942–1945); Edwin McCarthy, Secretary (1945–1950); John Crawford, Secretary (1950–1956)

The Department of Commerce and Agriculture was an Australian government department that existed between December 1942 and January 1956.

== Scope ==
Information about the department's functions and government funding allocation could be found in the Administrative Arrangements Orders, the annual Portfolio Budget Statements and in the Department's annual reports.

At the department's creation it was responsible for:

- Agriculture Production
- Agricultural Economics
- Assistance to Primary Producers
- Australian Agricultural Council
- Collection and dissemination of commercial intelligence and general information
- Contact with State Departments of Agriculture regarding agricultural production
- Contact with the following organization and administration of any Commonwealth Acts under which they are established:
  - Australian Apple and Pear Advisory Council
  - Australian Apple and Pear Marketing Board
  - Australian Barley Board
  - Australian Canned Fruits Board
  - Australian Citrus Advisory Council
  - Australian Dairy Produce Board
  - Australian Hides and Leather Industries Board
  - Australian Meat Board
  - Australian National Publicity Association
  - Australian Potato Board
  - Australian Tobacco Board
  - Australian Wheat Board
  - Australian Wine Board
  - Australian Wool Board
  - Australian Wool Realization Commission
  - Commonwealth Food Control
  - Council for the Australian Pig Industry
  - Dairy Produce Control Committee
  - Dried Fruits Control Board
  - Egg Producer's Council
  - Federal Potato Advisory Committee
  - Field Peas Board
  - Meat Canning Committee
  - Meat Industry Advisory Committee
  - Standing Committee on Agriculture
  - Superphosphate Industry Committee
  - Wheat Industry Stabilization Board
  - Wheat Stabilization Advisory Committee
  - Eastern Trade Advisory Committee
- Exhibitions (organization of trade exhibits)
- External Trade - Overseas trade promotion
- Fisheries - Administration of Commonwealth policy and co-ordination of State activities and control of fishing in extra-Territorial waters
- General Trade inquiries
- Investigation of overseas trade matters
- Inspection and grading of dairy produce, meat, fruit (fresh, dried and canned), jams, honey, vegetables, etc., exported from the Commonwealth
- Investigation of marketing, economic and other problems of farming industries
- Marketing investigations abroad
- Rural credits
- Rural man-power
- Tourist publicity abroad
- Trade Agreements-
  - Administration of export aspects
  - Collaboration with other Departments in negotiations
- Trade Commissioner Service
- Trade publicity and advertising in Australia, the United Kingdom and elsewhere
- Trade Surveys for specific commodities
- Published Overseas Trading

== Structure ==
The Department was a Commonwealth Public Service department, staffed by officials who were responsible to the Minister for Commerce and Agriculture.

== Subsequent agencies ==
- Department of Primary Industry (11 January 1956 – 2 June 1974)
- Department of Agriculture (12 June 1974 – 22 December 1975)
- Department of Primary Industry (22 December 1975 – 24 July 1987)
- Department of Primary Industries and Energy (24 July 1987 – 21 October 1998)
- Department of Agriculture, Fisheries and Forestry (21 October 1998 – 18 September 2013)
- Department of Agriculture (18 September 2013 – 21 September 2015)
- Department of Agriculture and Water Resources (21 September 2015 – 29 May 2019)

== Notable people ==
- Sir John Crawford, Secretary of the department in the 1950s
