= Department of Transport (1930–1932) =

Australian government department, 1930–1932

Department overview
- Formed: 21 April 1930
- Preceding Department: Department of Markets and Transport – for assisted migration from Britain; Co-ordination of transport, Commonwealth railways, War service homes Department of Home Affairs (II) – for Australian Capital Territory transport
- Dissolved: 12 April 1932
- Superseding Department: Department of Commerce – for navigation, shipping and lighthouses Department of the Interior (I) – for internal transport; War service homes; Waterside employment Prime Minister's Department – for shipping services for territories
- Jurisdiction: Commonwealth of Australia
- Headquarters: Melbourne
- Ministers responsible: Parker Moloney, Minister for Transport (1930–1932); Archdale Parkhill, Minister for Transport (1932)
- Department executive: Herbert Charles Brown, Secretary

The Department of Transport was an Australian government department that existed between April 1930 and April 1932.

== Scope ==
Information about the department's functions and government funding allocation could be found in the Administrative Arrangements Orders, the annual Portfolio Budget Statements and in the department's annual reports.

At its creation, the department was responsible for the following:

- Assisted migration from Great Britain, comprising household workers, boys for farms and re-union of families. Functions include approval or otherwise of requisitions by States for migrants; examination, selection and approval in Great Britain; also transportation to Australia
- Australian Overseas Transport Association
- Commonwealth Railways
- Co-ordination of Australian transport services- Collection and dissemination of information regarding Australia's resources and production, including transport and taxation
- Federal Transport Council
- Interstate railway freights
- Mechanical transport development, including
  - the testing of various types of motor vehicles likely to cheapen and improve Australian transport;
  - use in motor vehicles of Australian fuel, such as producer gas from charcoal;
  - dissemination of information regarding the latest overseas developments affecting motor transport.
- Overseas transport
- Unification of railway gauges
- War Service Homes Scheme

== Structure ==
The department was a Commonwealth Public Service department, staffed by officials who were responsible to the Minister for Transport, Parker Moloney until January 1932 and then Archdale Parkhill.

The secretary of the department was Herbert Charles Brown.
