= Department of Markets (1930–1932) =

Australian government department, 1930–1932

Department overview
- Formed: 21 April 1930
- Preceding Department: Department of Markets and Transport
- Dissolved: 13 April 1932
- Superseding Department: Department of Commerce
- Jurisdiction: Commonwealth of Australia
- Headquarters: Melbourne
- Ministers responsible: Parker Moloney, Minister (1930–1932); Charles Hawker, Minister (1932)
- Department executive: Edward Joseph Mulvany, Secretary

The Department of Markets was an Australian government department that existed between April 1930 and April 1932. It was the second so-named Australian government department.

== Scope ==
Information about the department's functions and government funding allocation could be found in the Administrative Arrangements Orders, the annual Portfolio Budget Statements and in the department's annual reports.

At its creation, the department was responsible for the following:

- Advances for purchase of wire and wire netting to settlers assisting the following organizations:
  - Australian Dairy Council
  - Australian Maize Council
  - Australian Pig Industry Council
  - Canned Fruit Export Control Board
  - Dairy Produce Export Control Board
  - Dried Fruits Export Control Board
  - Wine Overseas Marketing Board
  - Australian National Travel Association
- Board of Trade
- Collection and dissemination of commercial and industrial information
- Film publicity
- Inspection, grading, packing and marketing of butter, cheese and other dairy produce, meat, fresh, dried and canned fruits, seeds, vegetables, honey, jams, etc. exported from the Commonwealth
- Representation on international exhibitions
- Rural credits
- Trade publicity and advertising in the United Kingdom and other overseas countries
- Trade representation abroad

== Structure ==
The department was a Commonwealth Public Service department, staffed by officials who were responsible to the Minister for Markets, Parker Moloney until January 1932 and then Charles Hawker.

The Secretary of the Department was Edward Joseph.
