= Victor Wilson =

Australian politician (1877–1957)

The Honourable Sir Victor Wilson KBE
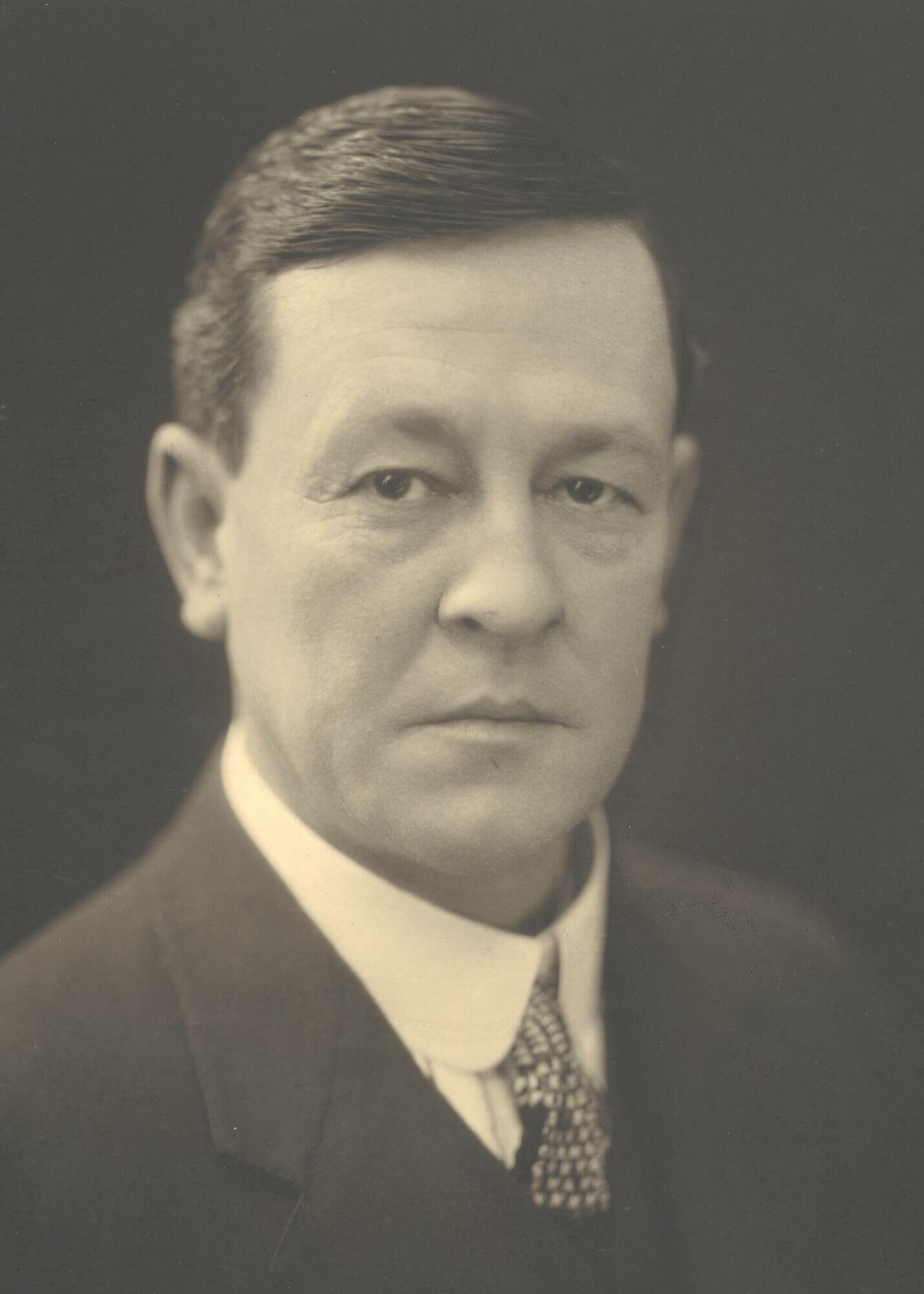

Minister for Markets and Migration
- In office 16 January 1925 – 18 June 1926
- Prime Minister: Stanley Bruce
- Preceded by: New office
- Succeeded by: Thomas Paterson

Senator for South Australia
- In office 1 July 1920 – 30 June 1926

Personal details
- Born: Reginald Victor Wilson; 30 June 1877 Adelaide, South Australia
- Died: 13 July 1957 (aged 80) Neutral Bay, New South Wales, Australia
- Party: Nationalist
- Occupation: Storekeeper

Sir Reginald Victor Wilson KBE (30 June 1877 – 13 July 1957) was an Australian politician and businessman. He served a single term as a Senator for South Australia (1920–1926) and was an honorary minister (1923–1925) and Minister for Markets and Migration in the Bruce–Page government (1925–1926).

== Early life ==
Wilson was born in Adelaide on 30 June 1877, the son of Elizabeth Ann (née Tonkin) and James Wilson, a storekeeper. He was educated at Riverton and Whinham College, North Adelaide. He bought a store at Broken Hill, New South Wales in 1898 and he married Lily May Suckling in February 1901. He was elected an alderman of the City of Broken Hill in 1908, but moved to Adelaide in 1909. He was mayor of the Corporate Town of St Peters in 1916 and 1917.

== Political career ==
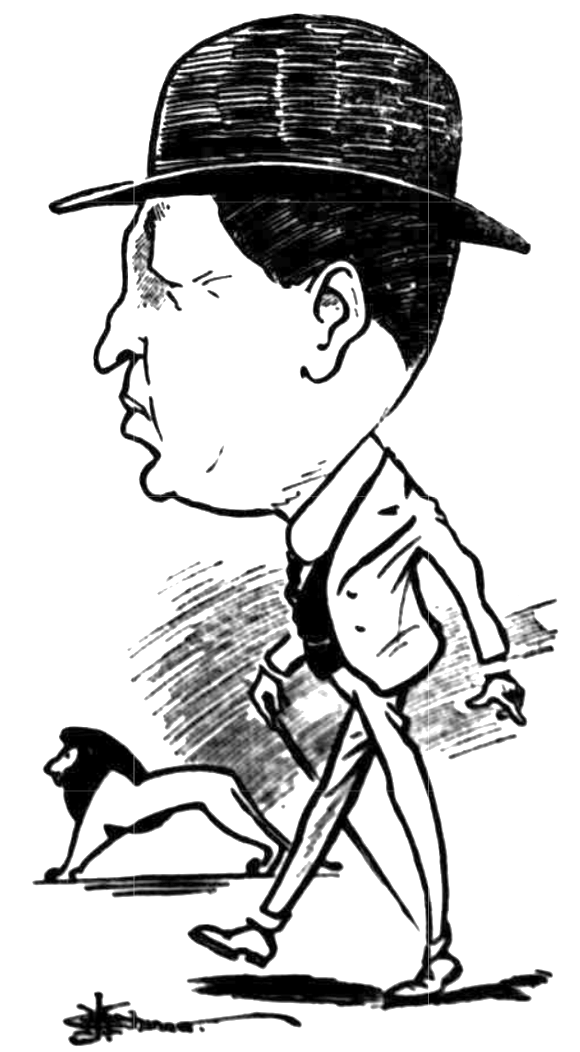
Caricature by John Henry Chinner

Wilson ran unsuccessfully for the South Australian Legislative Assembly seats of Torrens in 1912 and East Torrens in 1918, but was elected to the Australian Senate as a nominee of the Farmers and Settlers' Association to the composite Nationalist Party of Australia ticket at the 1919 election. From 1923 to 1925, he was an honorary minister in the Bruce-Page government with some responsibility for health and immigration. In March 1923, Stanley Bruce put him in charge of organising the Australian pavilion for the British Empire Exhibition at Wembley, London, which was aimed at stimulating immigration to Australia, promoting foreign investment and developing markets for Australian produce. In London, he also sought to negotiate an immigration agreement with the United Kingdom. He later negotiated a reciprocal trade agreement with Canada, which still gives some preferences for cars and car parts.

Wilson returned to Australia in June 1924 and was appointed Minister for Markets and Migration in January 1925. Although he had joined the Country Party, he refused to attend its parliamentary meetings and he refused to nominate for its pre-selection at the 1925 election on the basis that pre-selection should be automatic for ministers. As a result, the South Australian Country Party refused to endorse him and, even with Bruce's support, he gained only fourth place on the non-Labor ticket for the Senate and, as a result, failed to be re-elected.

== Later life ==
Wilson moved to Sydney in the late 1920s. He was president of the Motion Picture Distributors' Association from 1927 to 1939 and was accused of favouring American over Australian and British films. Wilson also served on the National Health and Medical Research Council (1938–1946), senior vice-chairman of the Royal North Shore Hospital (1938–1957), and chairman of National Press Ltd, the publisher of Smith's Weekly. He died in his house in the Sydney suburb of Neutral Bay on 13 July 1957, survived by two daughters.

== Honours ==
Wilson was made a Knight Commander of the Order of the British Empire in 1926.

== Notes ==
Political offices
Preceded by New portfolio	Minister for Markets and Migration; 1925–26	Succeeded by Thomas Paterson
