= Department of Markets and Transport =

Australian government department, 1928–1930

Department overview
- Formed: 10 December 1928
- Preceding Department: Department of Works and Railways – for Commonwealth railways and war service homes Department of Markets (I)
- Dissolved: 21 April 1930
- Superseding Department: Department of Markets (II) Department of Transport (I)
- Jurisdiction: Commonwealth of Australia
- Headquarters: Collins Street, Melbourne
- Ministers responsible: Thomas Paterson, Minister (1928–1929); Parker Moloney, Minister (1929–1930)
- Department executive: Herbert Charles Brown, Secretary

The Department of Markets and Transport was an Australian government department that existed between December 1928 and April 1930.

== History ==
When the Department was abolished, it was split into the Department of Markets (II) and the Department of Transport (I), and its functions divided between the two entities.

== Scope ==
Information about the department's functions and government funding allocation could be found in the Administrative Arrangements Orders, the annual Portfolio Budget Statements and in the Department's annual reports.

At its creation, the Department was responsible for the following:

- Advances for purchase of wire and wire netting by settlers
- Assisting the following organisations
  - Dairy Produce Export Control Board
  - Dried Fruits Export Control Board
  - Dried Fruits Advances Repayments Board
  - Australian Dairy Council
  - Canned Fruits Export Control
- Board Board of Trade Collections and dissemination of commercial and industrial information
- Inspection, grading, packing and marketing of butter, cheese and other dairy products, meat, fresh, dried and canned fruits, seeds, vegetables, jams, honey etc., exported from the Commonwealth
- Lighthouses, lightships, beacons and buoys
- Matters connected with the overseas marketing of Australian produce exported, including applications for financial assistance in connection therewith
- Navigation and shipping
- Railways
- Representation at international exhibitions
- Rural credits
- Trade publicity and advertising in the United Kingdom and other overseas countries
- War service homes

== Structure ==
The Department was a Commonwealth Public Service department, staffed by officials who were responsible to the Minister for Markets and Transport, Thomas Paterson until October 1929 and then Parker Moloney.
