= Department of Commerce (Australia) =

Australian government department, 1932–1942

Department overview
- Formed: 13 April 1932
- Preceding Department: Department of Markets (II) – for trade and agriculture Department of Transport (I) – for navigation, shipping and lighthouses
- Dissolved: 22 December 1942
- Superseding Department: Department of Commerce and Agriculture
- Jurisdiction: Commonwealth of Australia
- Headquarters: City, Canberra
- Ministers responsible: Charles Hawker, Minister of Commerce; William Scully, Minister of Commerce
- Department executives: Edward Joseph Mulvany, Secretary (1932–1934); Frank Murphy, Secretary (1934–1942)

The Department of Commerce was an Australian government department that existed between April 1932 and December 1942.

== History ==
The Department was created by the Lyons government when Cabinet approved the creation of the Department of Commerce in April 1932, renaming the previous Department of Markets. At the time of announcing the new department, Prime Minister Joseph Lyons said that it would generally have control of trade matters, with the government planning to wind down the Department of Trade and Customs's role in relation to trade, including by changing legislation where necessary.

In 1935 the Department of Commerce was enlarged and several officials were appointed to its ranks, including from the development branch of the Prime Minister's Department. By August 1935 the Commerce Department had about 80 people on its central staff. In 1936, the Department of Commerce was transferred from Melbourne to Canberra, part of a policy to centralise the general and political administration of Australia at the seat of government.

The Department was abolished in December 1942 and replaced by the Department of Commerce and Agriculture. A report in the Cairns Post said the effect of the change would be to establish the independence of the Commonwealth Director of Agriculture from the permanent head of the Commerce Department, then Edward Joseph Mulvany.

== Scope ==
Information about the department's functions and government funding allocation could be found in the Administrative Arrangements Orders, the annual Portfolio Budget Statements and in the Department's annual reports.

At the department's creation it was responsible for:

- Government trade, agriculture, shipping, navigation
- Advances for purchase of wire and wire netting to settlers
- Assisting the following organisations:
  - Australian Apple and Pear Export Council
  - Australian Dairy Council
  - Australian Maize Council
  - Australian Pig Industry Council
  - Canned Fruits Control Board
  - Dairy Produce Control Board
  - Dried Fruits Control Board
  - Dried Fruits Interstate Organisations
  - Wine Overseas Marketing Board
- Australian National Travel Association
- Board of Trade
- The Provisional Commonwealth Council of State Egg Producers' Organisations

== Structure ==
The Department was a Commonwealth Public Service department, staffed by officials who were responsible to the Minister for Commerce.
