= Department of Markets (1928) =

Australian government department, 1928

Department overview
- Formed: 19 January 1928
- Preceding Department: Department of Markets and Migration
- Dissolved: 10 December 1928
- Superseding Department: Department of Markets and Transport
- Jurisdiction: Commonwealth of Australia
- Headquarters: Melbourne
- Minister responsible: Thomas Paterson, Minister
- Department executives: Edward Joseph Mulvany, Secretary (Jan – Apr 1928); Hayburn Thomson, Acting Secretary (Apr – Aug 1928); Herbert Charles Brown, Secretary (Aug – Dec 1928)

The Department of Markets was an Australian government department that existed between January and December 1928.

== Scope ==
Information about the department's functions and government funding allocation could be found in the Administrative Arrangements Orders, the annual Portfolio Budget Statements and in the Department's annual report.

The Department dealt with all matters connected with the marketing of Australian products overseas, including canned and dried fruits, meat, eggs and pearl-shell. It also handled the following matters:

- The collection and dissemination of commercial and industrial information
- Financial assistance in connection with the production of certain crops
- Trade publicity and advertising overseas
- Exhibitions
- Advances to state governments for the purchase of wire netting by settlers
- Rural credits and inter-Imperial trade

== Structure ==
The Department was a Commonwealth Public Service department, staffed by officials who were responsible to the Minister for Markets, Thomas Paterson.
