= Joseph Carrodus =

Australian public servant

Joseph Carrodus CBE

Secretary of the Department of the Interior (I)
- In office 25 November 1935 – 26 April 1939

Secretary of the Department of the Interior (II)
- In office 26 April 1939 – 1949

Personal details
- Born: Joseph Aloysius Carrodus; 3 November 1885 Richmond, Melbourne, Victoria, Australia
- Died: 8 April 1961 (aged 75) Canberra
- Spouse(s): Mabel Florence Maud, née Waters (m. 1923; w. 1961)
- Children: Peter and Joy
- Education: University of Melbourne
- Occupation: Public servant

Joseph Aloysius Carrodus CBE (3 September 1885 – 8 April 1961) was a senior Australian public servant.

== Early life and career ==
Joseph Carrodus was born on 3 September 1885 in Richmond, Melbourne, Victoria, Australia. He studied at St. Patrick's College in East Melbourne and then the University of Melbourne.

Carrodus joined the Department of External Affairs as a junior in 1904, not long after leaving school.

During World War I, he enlisted in the Australian Imperial Force in February 1916, departing from Melbourne on the ship HMAT A34 Persic in June 1916 to fight in France as an infantry captain. He returned to Australia on 27 May 1919, joining the Department of Home and Territories as a clerk.

On 14 March 1923, Carrodus married Mabel Florence Maud, and the pair settled in Canberra in 1927.

== Later life and career ==
Carrodus was Acting Administrator of the Northern Territory from April to October 1934, and while there stated that the "effort to breed out colour is a commendable one", regarding inter-war proposals to "breed out the colour" of Aboriginal Australians of mixed descent. When he returned to Canberra from the role in the Northern Territory, he prepared a report recommending the Administrator of the Northern Territory and other branch heads make periodic visits to the Northern Territory inland in the dry season, writing Darwin is not the Territory, it gives no indication of the conditions prevailing inland."

Carrodus was appointed Secretary of the Department of the Interior (I) in 1935, and stayed on in the role as the department transitioned to a newly Christened Department of the Interior (II), until his retirement from the Australian Public Service in 1949.

Carrodus and his wife Mabel were keen gardeners, and rarely missed Canberra Horticultural Society shows.

Carrodus died on 8 April 1961 in Canberra Community Hospital and was buried in Canberra cemetery.

== Awards ==
Carrodus was made a Commander of the Order of the British Empire in 1939 for his services as Secretary of the Department of the Interior.

Government offices
Preceded by Herbert Charles Brown	Secretary of the Department of the Interior (I); 1935 – 1939	Succeeded by Himself as Secretary of the Department of the Interior (II)
Preceded by Himself as Secretary of the Department of the Interior (I)	Secretary of the Department of the Interior (II); 1935 – 1939	Succeeded by Bill McLaren
