= Parker Moloney =

Australian politician (1879–1961)

The Honourable Parker Moloney
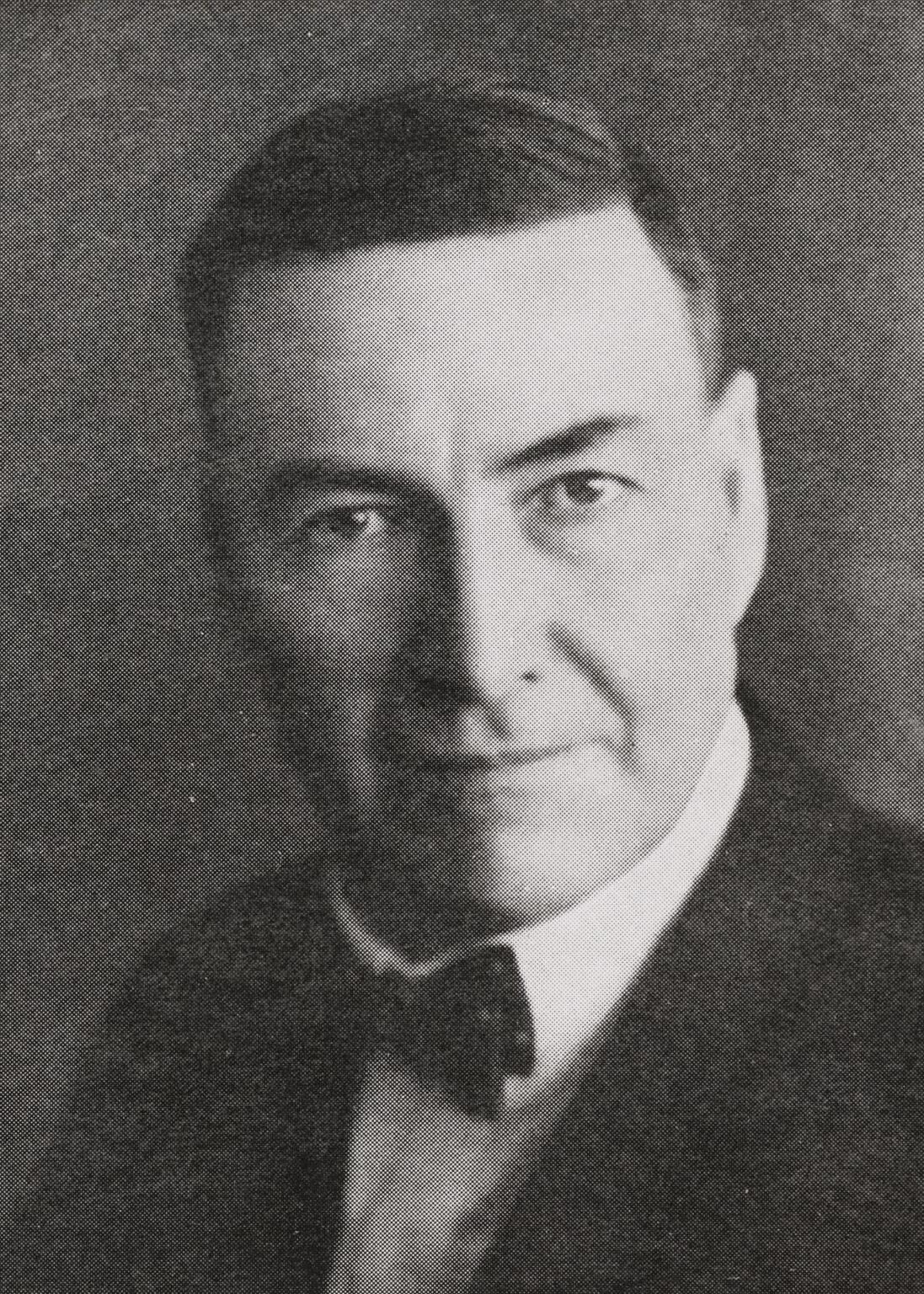

Minister for Markets and Transport
- In office 22 October 1929 – 6 January 1932
- Prime Minister: James Scullin
- Preceded by: Thomas Paterson
- Succeeded by: Charles Hawker (Markets); Archdale Parkhill (Transport)

Member of the Australian Parliament for Hume
- In office 13 December 1919 – 19 December 1931
- Preceded by: Franc Falkiner
- Succeeded by: Thomas Collins

Member of the Australian Parliament for Indi
- In office 5 September 1914 – 5 May 1917
- Preceded by: Cornelius Ahern
- Succeeded by: John Leckie
- In office 13 April 1910 – 31 May 1913
- Preceded by: Joseph Brown
- Succeeded by: Cornelius Ahern

Personal details
- Born: 12 August 1879 Port Fairy, Victoria, Australia
- Died: 8 May 1961 (aged 81) Victoria, Australia
- Party: Labor
- Spouse: Margaret Mary Mills
- Occupation: Teacher

Parker John Moloney (12 August 1879 – 8 May 1961) was an Australian politician. A member of the Labor Party, he served in the House of Representatives from 1910 to 1913, 1914 to 1917, and 1919 to 1931. He was Minister for Markets and Minister for Transport in the Scullin government from 1929 to 1932.

== Early life ==
Moloney was born in Port Fairy, Victoria, to Maurice Moloney and Mary, née Bowe. He became a teacher at John O'Hara's South Melbourne College in 1902 and then at University High School. Around this time he began to be interested in labour politics and attended the Catholic Young Men's Association. In 1906 he became principal of Beechworth College.

== Member of Parliament ==
In 1910, Moloney won the Victorian seat of Indi for Labor. He lost it in 1913, but regained it in 1914. In the same year, on 15 April, he was married to Margaret Mary Mills. However, it was his opposition to conscription which lost him the seat for good in 1917. He relocated to New South Wales and, in 1919, became the first Labor representative for Hume. Despite representing a New South Wales seat, he continued to live in Melbourne, but built up a strong support base in Hume. He was one of only a small number of people who have represented more than one state or territory in the Parliament.

In 1928, Moloney fell gravely ill with appendicitis, and was operated on by his fellow MP, Earle Page.

Moloney was Minister for Markets and Transport from 1929 to 1931, as part of the Scullin government. He negotiated Australia's first trade treaty with Canada, and was rewarded with a parliamentary ovation. Despite many continuing exploits, including preparing for the Imperial Economic Conference of 1932, to be held at Ottawa, Canada, Moloney lost his seat in the conservative landslide of 1931.

== Later life ==
There were no parliamentary pensions, which left Moloney almost destitute. He sold his house and moved in with his sister-in-law. With former colleague Richard Keane, he managed to buy two old mining dumps near Bendigo, which were sold to the Collins House Group for £3000. He also became active in the share market. By 1939 he was president of the Australian Labor Party in Victoria, but, despite two unsuccessful Senate campaigns, he withdrew from politics in 1943, when Labor won office. Although he gradually moved away from the ALP, he certainly never joined the DLP and in fact, disagreed with many of the policies of the Democratic Labor Party. Chairman of the Victorian Dried Fruits Board from 1936 to 1957, he was only able to retire after Prime Minister Robert Menzies ensured he would be provided with a pension. He was closely associated with Archbishop Daniel Mannix, and was always interested in horse-racing.

== Personal life ==
Moloney died on 8 May 1961 and was given a state funeral. He was remembered by Archbishop Guilford Young as "outstanding among a great generation of Catholic men who had a special Catholic ethos".

Moloney was a devout Catholic. In 1947 he participated in a lecture series sponsored by the Legion of Mary, speaking on the subject "why I am a Catholic". He spoke of his conviction that the Catholic Church was the one true church and according to The Advocate was of the view that "the Christian religion was being assailed as never before by a ruthless enemy pledged to an insidious Marxian doctrine aimed at the complete dethronement of God".

Political offices
Preceded by Thomas Paterson	Minister for Markets and Transport; 1929–31	Succeeded by Archdale Parkhill
Parliament of Australia
Preceded by Joseph Brown	Member for Indi; 1910–13	Succeeded by Cornelius Ahern
Preceded by Cornelius Ahern	Member for Indi; 1914–17	Succeeded by John Leckie
Preceded by Franc Falkiner	Member for Hume; 1919–31	Succeeded by Thomas Collins
