= Department of the Interior (1932–1939) =

Former Australian government department

Department overview
- Formed: 12 April 1932
- Preceding Department: Department of Works and Railways Department of Home Affairs (II) Department of Transport (I)
- Dissolved: 26 April 1939
- Superseding Department: Department of the Interior (II) Department of Supply and Development (I)
- Jurisdiction: Commonwealth of Australia
- Headquarters: Canberra
- Ministers responsible: Archdale Parkhill, Minister (1932); John Perkins, Minister (1932–1934); Eric Harrison, Minister (1934); Thomas Paterson, Minister (1934–1937); John McEwen, Minister (1937–1939)
- Department executives: Herbert Charles Brown, Secretary (1932–1935); Joseph Carrodus, Secretary (1935–1939)

The Department of the Interior was an Australian government department that existed between April 1932 and April 1939. It was the first so-named Australian Government department to be created, and was replaced by the Department of the Interior (II).

== Scope ==
Information about the department's functions and government funding allocation could be found in the Administrative Arrangements Orders, the annual Portfolio Budget Statements and in the department's annual reports.

The department was a composite department and dealt with a diverse range of activities. According to National Archives of Australia records, at its creation the department dealt with:

- Aliens Registration
- Astronomy
- Australian War Memorial
- Commonwealth Literary Fund
- Conveyance of Members of Parliament and others
- Co-ordination of Australian Transport Services
- Elections and Franchise
- Emigration of children and aboriginals
- Federal Transport Council
- Forestry
- Geodesy
- Immigration
- Indentured Coloured Labour
- Lands and Survey
- Meteorology
- Naturalization
- Northern Territory
- Oil Investigation and Prospecting (Encouragement of)
- Passports
- Pearl Shelling and Trepang Fisheries in Australian waters beyond Territorial Limits
- Properties (a) transferred (b) acquired (c) rented
- Prospecting for precious metals (assistance for)
- Public Works and Services
- Railways
- Rivers, roads and bridges
- Seat of Government
- Solar Observatory
- War Service Homes Scheme
- Waterside employment

== Structure ==
The department was a Commonwealth Public Service department, staffed by officials who were responsible to the Minister for the Interior.

== References and further reading ==
- A short history of the Department of the Interior (PDF), ArchivesACT, 1964, archived from the original (PDF) on 11 May 2013
