= Department of the Interior (1939–1972) =

Australian government department

Department overview
- Formed: 26 April 1939
- Preceding Department: Department of the Interior (I) Department of Works (I)
- Dissolved: 19 December 1972
- Jurisdiction: Commonwealth of Australia
- Employees: 8,411 (in 1969)
- Department executives: Joseph Carrodus, Secretary (1939–1949); Bill McLaren, Secretary (1949–1963); Richard Kingsland, Secretary (1963–1970); George Warwick Smith, Secretary (1970–1972)

The Department of the Interior was an Australian government department that existed between April 1939 and December 1972. It was the second so-named Australian government department.

== Scope ==
Information about the department's functions and government funding allocation could be found in the Administrative Arrangements Orders, the annual Portfolio Budget Statements and in the department's annual reports.

The department was diverse and dealt with a broad range of activities. According to the Administrative Arrangements Order made on 30 November 1939, the department dealt with:

- Aliens – registration of
- Ashmore and Cartier Islands
- Assisted Migration
- Astronomy
- Australian Capital Territory – administration of
- Australian War Memorial
- Conveyance of Members of Parliament and others
- Co-ordination of Australian Transport Services
- Elections and franchise
- Emigration of children and aboriginals
- Forestry
- Geodesy
- Immigration
- Indentured Coloured labour
- Lands and Surveys
- Maintenance and operation of electric light, water and sewerage services in the Australian Capital Territory
- Meteorology
- Naturalisation
- Northern Territory
- Oil Investigation and prospecting
- Passports
- Preparation of design and execution of all Commonwealth Architectural and Engineering Works in the States, Northern Territory and ACT including works for the Commonwealth Bank of Australia
- Properties transferred, rented or acquired
- Public Works and Services
- Prospecting for precious metals (assistance for)
- Railways
- River Murray Waters Commission
- Rivers, roads and bridges
- Solar observatory

== Structure ==
The department was a Commonwealth Public Service department, staffed by officials who were responsible to the Minister for the Interior.

== References and further reading ==
- A short history of the Department of the Interior (PDF), ArchivesACT, 1964, archived from the original (PDF) on 11 May 2013
