= Repatriation Commission Outpatient Clinic =

Hospital

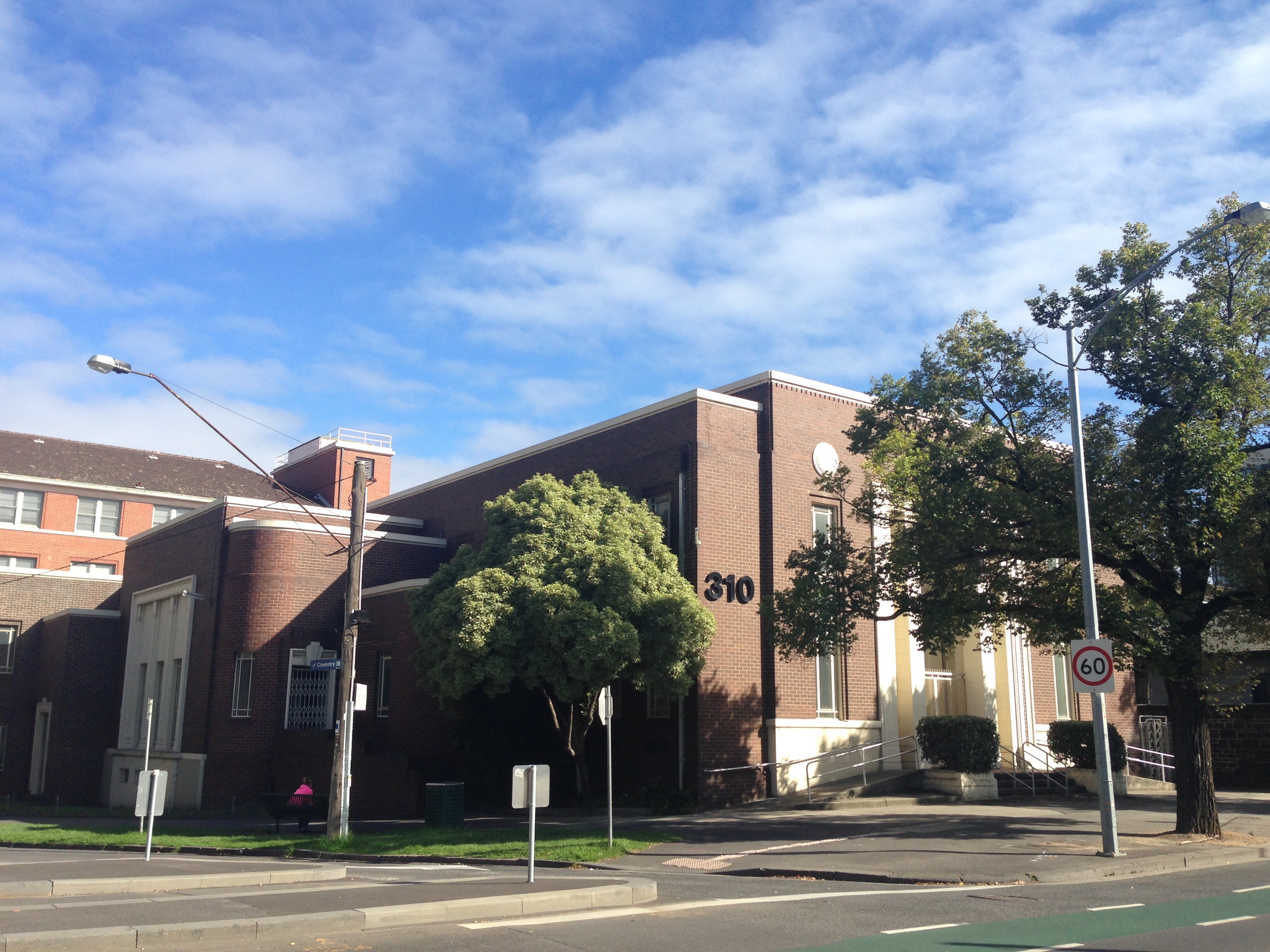
- Repatriation Commission Outpatient Clinic
- Alternative names: 310 St Kilda Road

General information
- Type: Veterans Medical Clinic
- Architectural style: Art Deco
- Location: 310 St Kilda Road, Melbourne, Australia
- Coordinates: 37.828492°S 144.970900°E
- Current tenants: None
- Construction started: 1936
- Completed: 15 November 1937, 89 years ago
- Cost: £24,000
- Client: Repatriation Commission
- Owner: Commonwealth of Australia, managed by the Australian Department of Defence,

Design and construction
- Architect: George Hallandal
- Main contractor: Blease, MacPherson & Co, Master Builder, 31 Queen St, Melbourne

The Repatriation Commission Outpatient Clinic at 310 St Kilda Road, Melbourne, Australia, is an Art Deco building of architectural and historical significance as the only remaining Repatriation Commission Outpatient Clinic or Commonwealth building built for the health and wellbeing of the original ANZACs (i.e., World War I veterans).

Significantly the building was constructed for the ANZACs of World War I nearly 20 years after the end of the war. The clinic subsequently supported the wellbeing of veterans of World War II, Korean War and Vietnam War. The Australian veteran community consider it a sacred place due to the connection to the suffering of veterans returned from those wars.

== Post-World War I ==
In 1936 the Repatriation Commission took control of a parcel of land on the corner of St Kilda Road and Coventry St from the Department of Defence to construct a facility to address the needs of the large population of World War I veterans.

'The out-patient clinic, which is at present within the Branch Office on St. Kilda-road, Melbourne, is so congested that no longer can the conditions be allowed to remain, and plans have been prepared for the erection of an out-patient clinic on a site made available by the Defence Department. All preliminaries have been hastened and an early commencement of the work of construction is anticipated.'

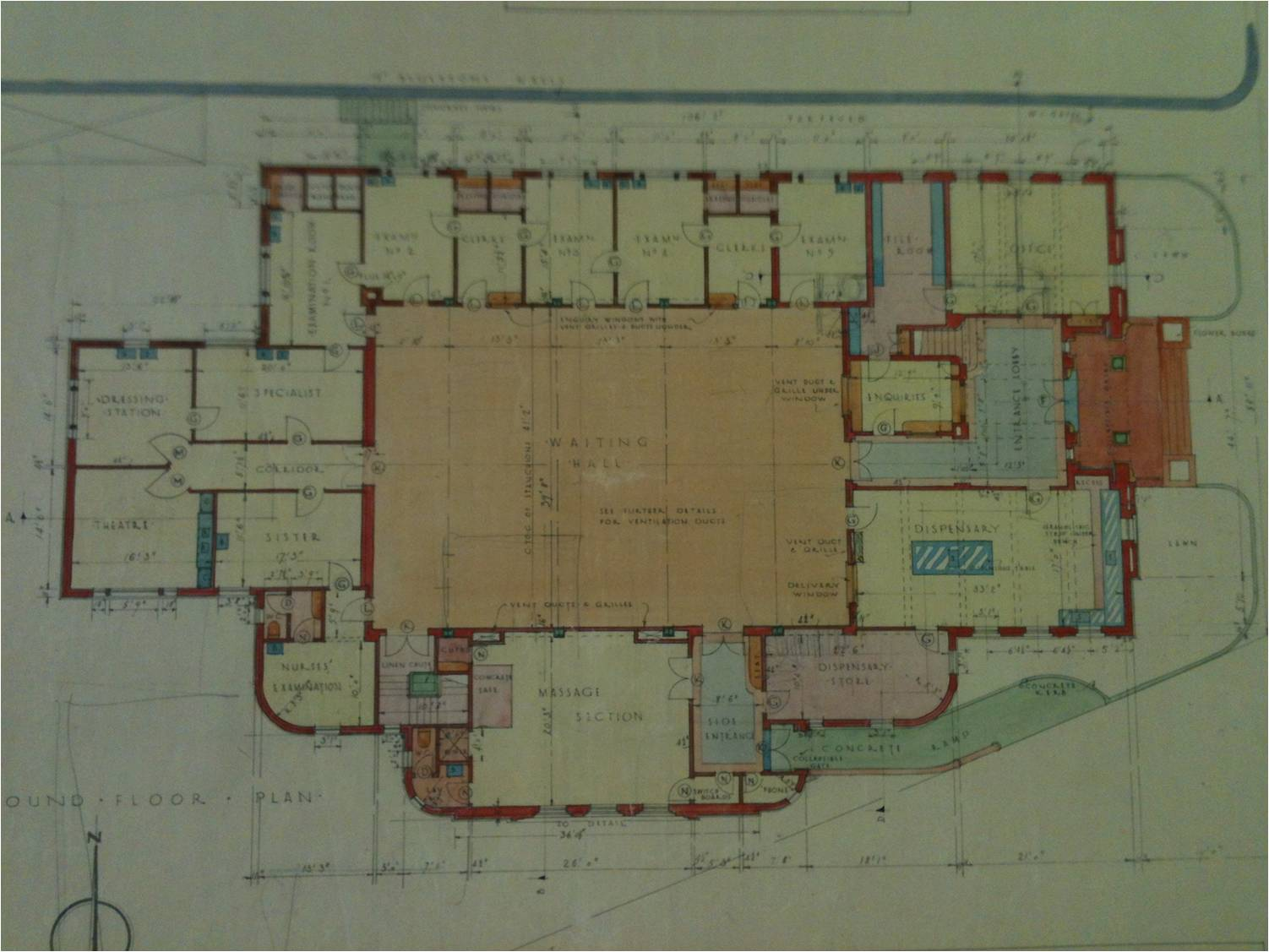
Original floor plan of the Repatriation Commission Outpatient Clinic

'With increasing numbers requiring out-patient treatment, the accommodation at the Branch Office in St. Kilda-road was inadequate. Men suffering from all types of disabilities, many of them accompanied by their wives and children, had to sit in a basement waiting room. Another inconvenience through lack of space was the necessity for accommodating two medical examiners in each of the small cubicles built as examination rooms. These disabilities, together with other factors, made it imperative that better conditions should be provided. It was decided to erect a new out-patient clinic, the building embodying the latest facilities, including air conditioning, single rooms for medical examining officers, and a large general waiting room.'

On this site the Repatriation Commission Outpatient Clinic was built adjacent to Victoria Barracks, Melbourne, it was opened on 15 November 1937, to provide a greater level of care to veterans. The building was designed by George Hallandal, under the supervision of Commonwealth Works Department Director, H. L. McKennall. Within months of opening as many as 400 prescriptions were being administered daily.

The design of the Repatriation Clinic created some controversy with Sir Arthur Streeton criticising the use of brown brick in contrast to the established bluestone brick of Victoria Barracks.

=== Original functional spaces ===
- Reception
- Large central waiting hall
- Pharmaceutical dispensary and store room
- Ducted heating
- Medical examination rooms
- Clarks offices
- Theatre for minor surgery procedures
- Dressing station
- Sisters office
- Nursing examination office
- Massage
- Administrative offices
- Archives file room

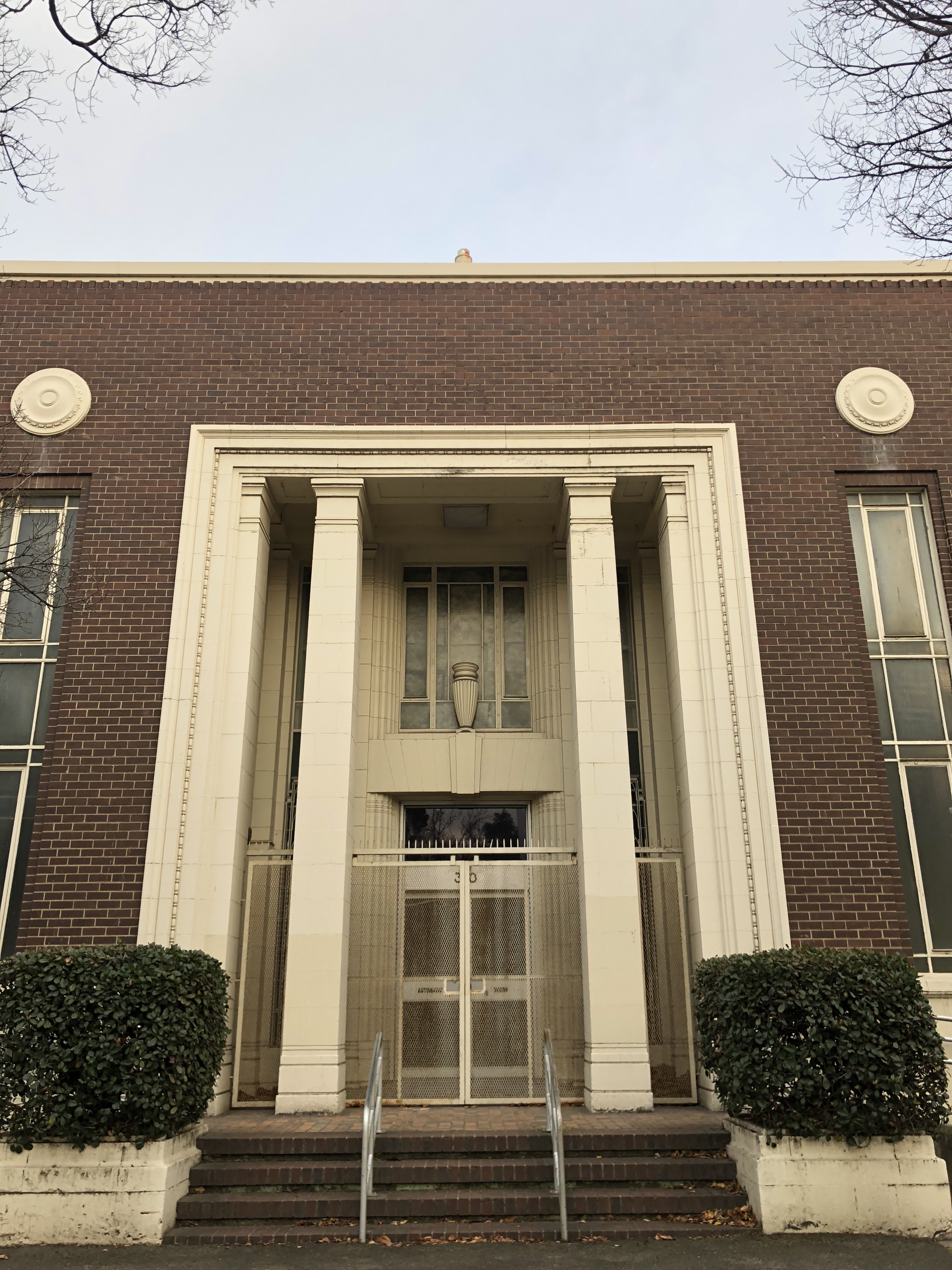
Facade of the former Repatriation Commission Outpatient Clinic, 2018

The Repatriation Commission 1938 Annual Report to the Australian Parliament the Commission stated 'The Repatriation Clinic opened in St. Kilda Road, Melbourne, in November, 1937, now provides satisfactory conditions for those patients whose ailments need out-patient supervision and treatment. All modern facilities except those which can only be provided in large centres, e.g. deep X-ray and Radium Therapy, are available at this institution. The commission is gradually adding to the therapeutic armament at its institutions, so that the medical staffs will not be handicapped in their efforts to aid their patients... The spacious warmed waiting hall has proved a great boon to the patients, and the improved conditions for the medical and other staffs are greatly appreciated.'

During World War 2 the clinic continued in its role. A report by the Department of Administrative Services (DAS) in 1982 indicated that General Douglas MacArthur's headquarters occupied the basement level. In commenting on the future use of the clinic, in its 1982 report DAS also said "Defence propose to use the building for storage. This is considered an unbecoming use for the building with such a prominent position, bearing in mind that the building appears structurally sound and in reasonably good condition. The Victoria Barracks Historical Committee support retention of the building and a better use should be found" (NAA ID 23832143).

== Post-World War II ==
Up to 340 veterans visited the clinic each day with as many as 200 at a time waiting to see one of the six doctors available. As early as 1946 complaints emerged that the clinic was too small and understaffed for the large number of veterans attending each day. The delays and inability to see a doctor after hours caused veterans to lose earnings, leading to increased calls to see their own doctors in the suburban consulting rooms. These calls where rejected.

An extension was added to the building in 1950 for a war neurosis clinic, designed by D. B. Windebank with a usable floor area in 2020 of 1,667m2 of a total of 2,240m2.

Based on the success of the addition of the neurosis clinic the Minister for Repatriation, Senator Sir Walter Cooper (Queensland politician) M.B.E. (Mil), and the Repatriation Department, planned to establish outpatient clinics for psychiatric treatment in all capital cities.

Since the clinic was opened the Australian Red Cross maintained a canteen where tea, coffee and biscuits were provided. As many as 25 volunteers ran the canteen on a non-profit basis to support and comfort the veterans waiting for their appointments. Between 200 and 250 where served by the Red Cross on a daily basis between 10am and 4pm. One veteran reported to have served in the Sudan War was affectionately called 'Keep Smiling' for his happy disposition.

The Clinic was singled out in the Master Builders Federation of Australia (NSW) journal, Building and Engineering, of 25 September 1950, representing the attractive properties on St Kilda Rd. "The people of Melbourne are rightly proud of their splendid St Kilda Road, which, extending from Princes Bridge over the Yarra to St Kilda, is undoubtedly one of the finest thoroughfares in Australia, and with its continuous rows of trees which arch overhead, being very reminiscent of the Parisian boulevardes. Naturally the civic authorities, with the full support of the people of Melbourne, are jealous of the preservation of the beauty of this thoroughfare, and exercises care in regard to the buildings that are erected along it. Our illustration shows the Outpatient Clinic for the Repatriation Commission of Victoria, which was erected fronting St. Kilda Road in the years immediately prior to world War II. The building was designed by the Department of the Interior and erected by Blease, MacPherson and Co.".

The Repatriation Clinic began relocation to 444 St Kilda Rd in 1979, and ceased operations from the Clinic in 1980. Consideration was given to the future use of the property with reports from 1982 indicating it would be handed back to the Department of Defence. Defence indicated that it would be used for storage, while the Department of Administrative Services recommended a more fitting use given its prominent location and good condition. Once handed back to the Department of Defence it was used as the Maintenance Engineering Agency (MEA), now the Land Engineering Agency (LEA), until December 1995. The Parliamentary Standing Committee on Public Works considered a proposal in 1993 to repurpose the building into its original purpose as the Defence Health Care Centre (DHCC) at a cost of $1.3million, which was not approved. The former Repatriation Clinic has been reportedly vacant since 1999 while the MEA newsletter (Maintenance News) No's. 66 (Sep 1995) and 67 (Dec 1995) indicates the last organisation to occupy the Repatriation Clinic moved out in 1995.

Toward the end of 1995 the outcome of a compensation matter was resolved for staff of the MEA who had been working at 310 St Kilda Rd. Nominated staff were to be "paid a disability allowance at the rate of $2 per day for each day or part of a day worked at either locality by the officer or employee during that period". The claim was in "respect of the detrimental effect on working conditions that resulted from building and alteration activities at these sites from 18 April 1994 to 1 July 1994 inclusive".

On 15 November 2017, the 80th anniversary of the opening of the Repatriation Clinic, Senator Derryn Hinch moved motion no.563 in the Senate to acknowledge the event and the significance of the clinic to the wellbeing of the veteran community while Victorian Member of Parliament, Tim McCurdy, acknowledged the milestone in the Parliament of Victoria.

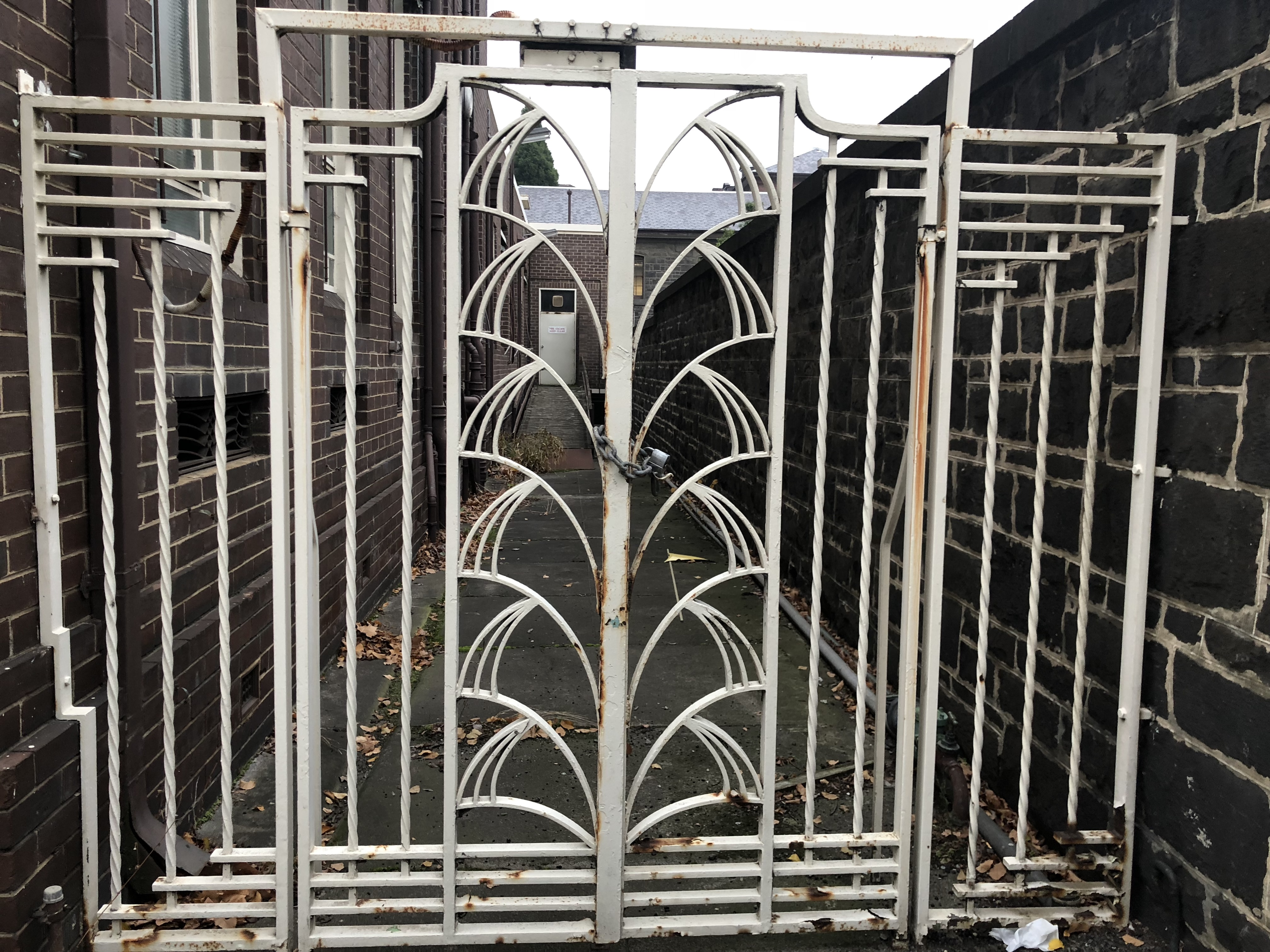
Art Deco gates

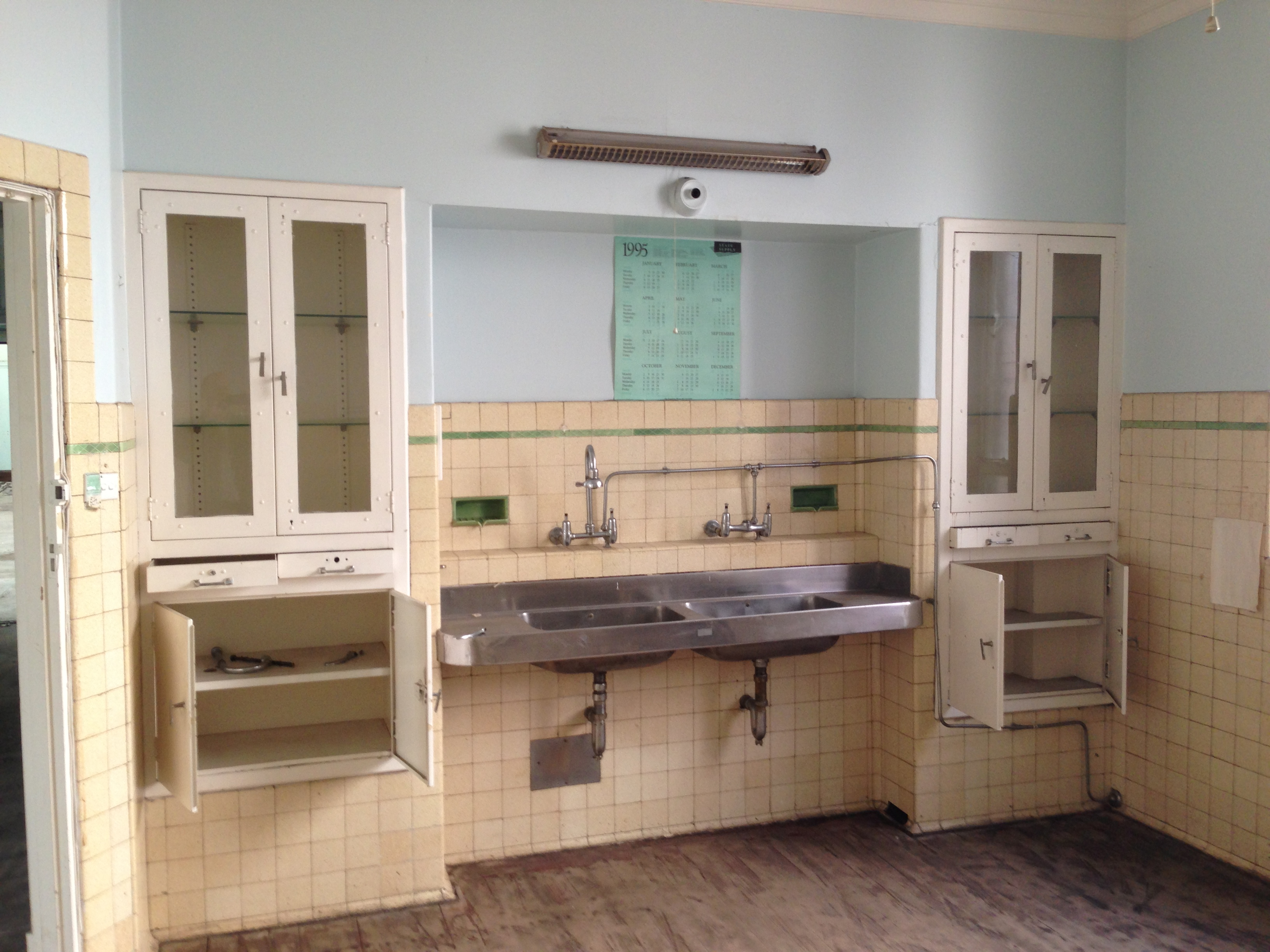
Original theatre intact, circa 2013

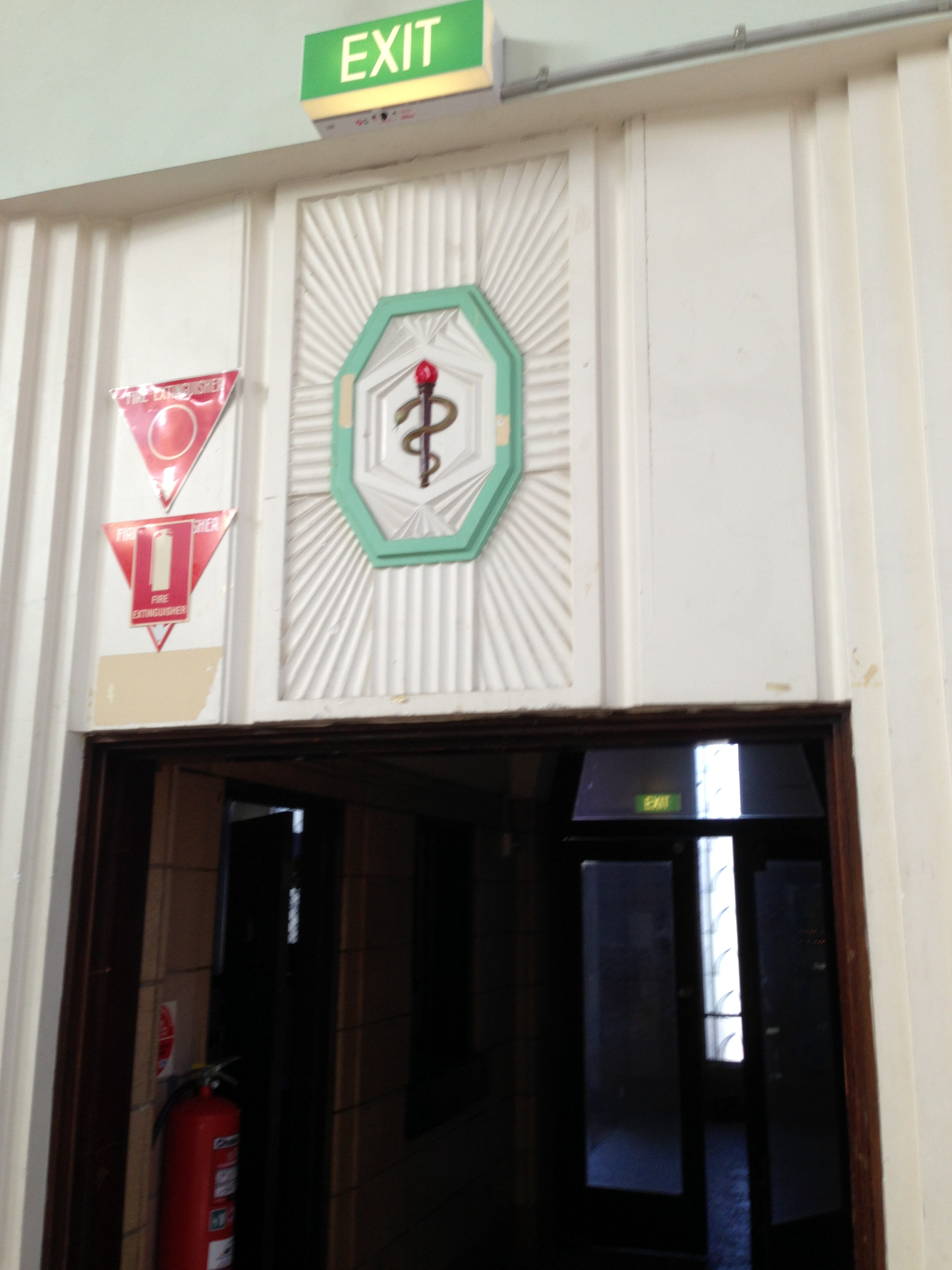
Medical symbol (the Rod of Asclepius) in an Art Deco design in the waiting hall, 2013

The former Repatriation Commission Outpatient Clinic sits immediately adjacent to Melbourne's Domain Parkland and Memorial Precinct, which was entered on the National Heritage List on 13 February 2017 under the emergency listing provisions of the Environment Protection and Biodiversity Conservation Act 1999 (Cth). The National Heritage List recognises places of outstanding significance to the Australian nation. The Domain Parkland listing encompasses the commemorative and veteran-associated character of the broader St Kilda Road landscape. The clinic's historic function as a place of care and rehabilitation for returned service personnel forms part of that broader landscape, representing a heritage value complementary to the commemorative precinct: a place built not to remember those who died, but to support those who returned. The formal boundary of the National Heritage listing does not include the clinic site, which sits on a separate title immediately adjacent to the listed precinct.

The building has been the victim of graffiti vandalism. In November 2019 a graffiti tag was left on the southern side, on 16 March 2023 the building was tagged on the upper part of the southern side with 'Evoke' and in July 2025 the building entry was also tagged.

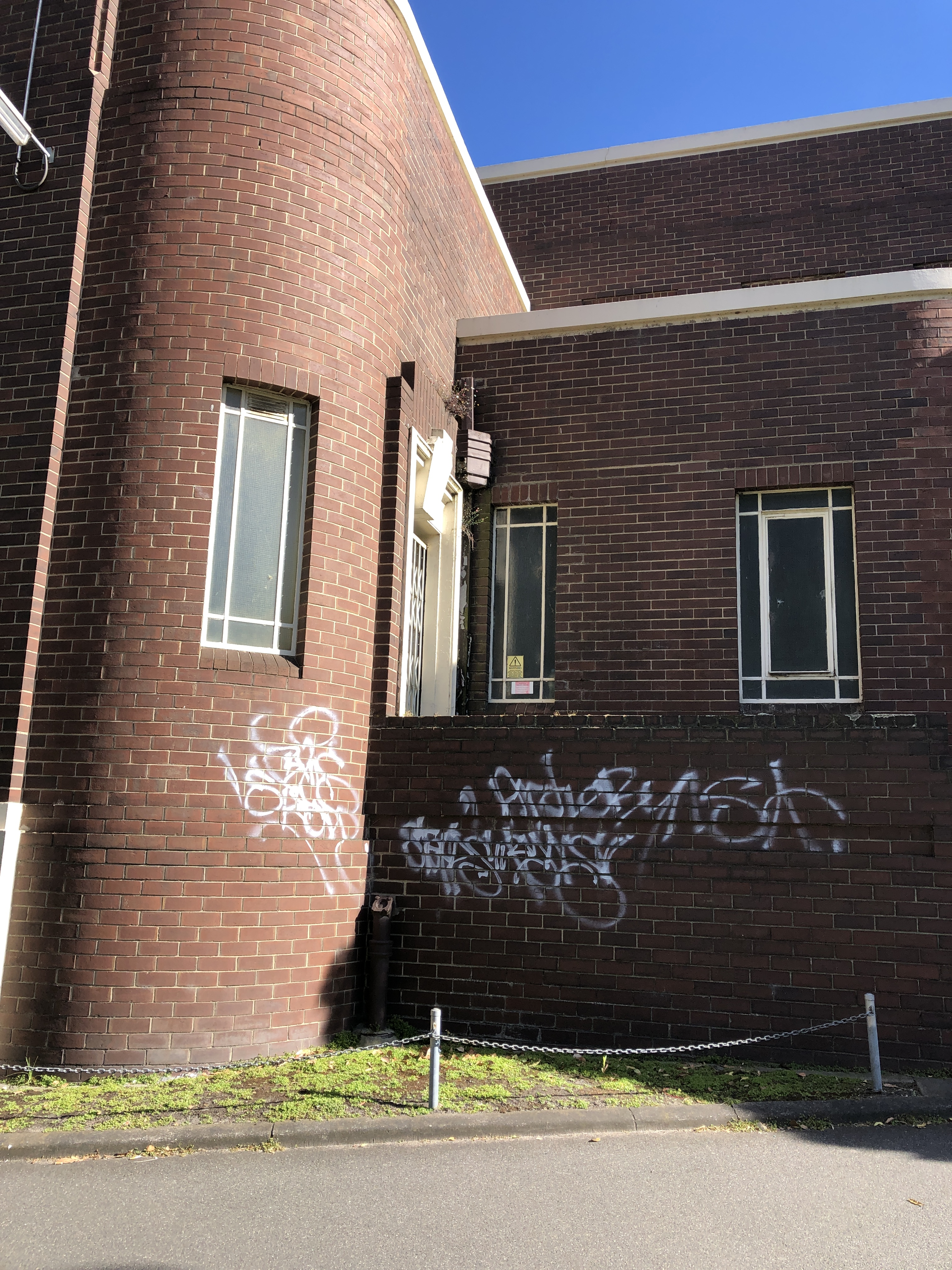
310 St Kilda Rd Graffiti Tag, November 2019

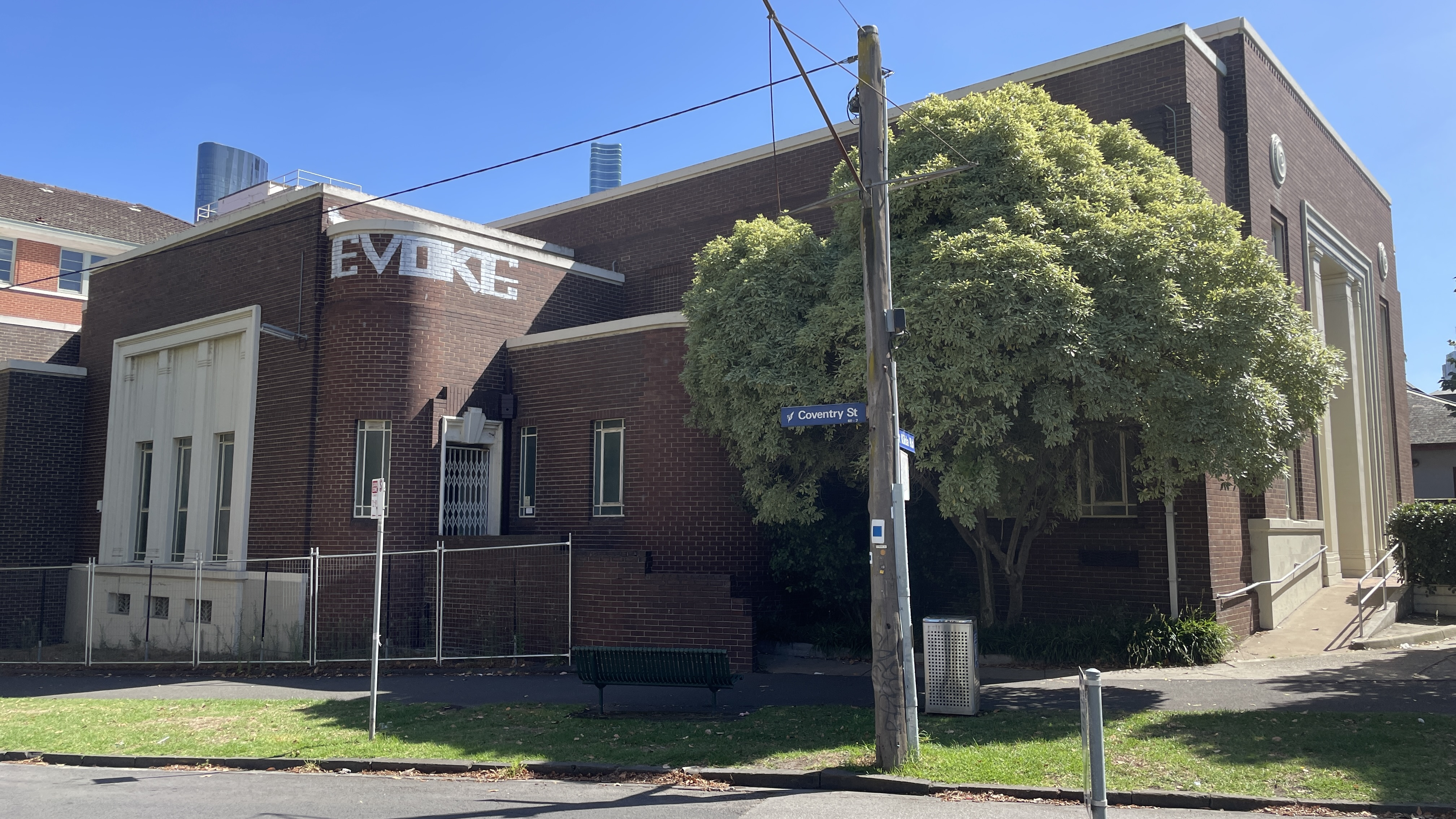
Evoke Tag on 310 St Kilda Rd, March 2023

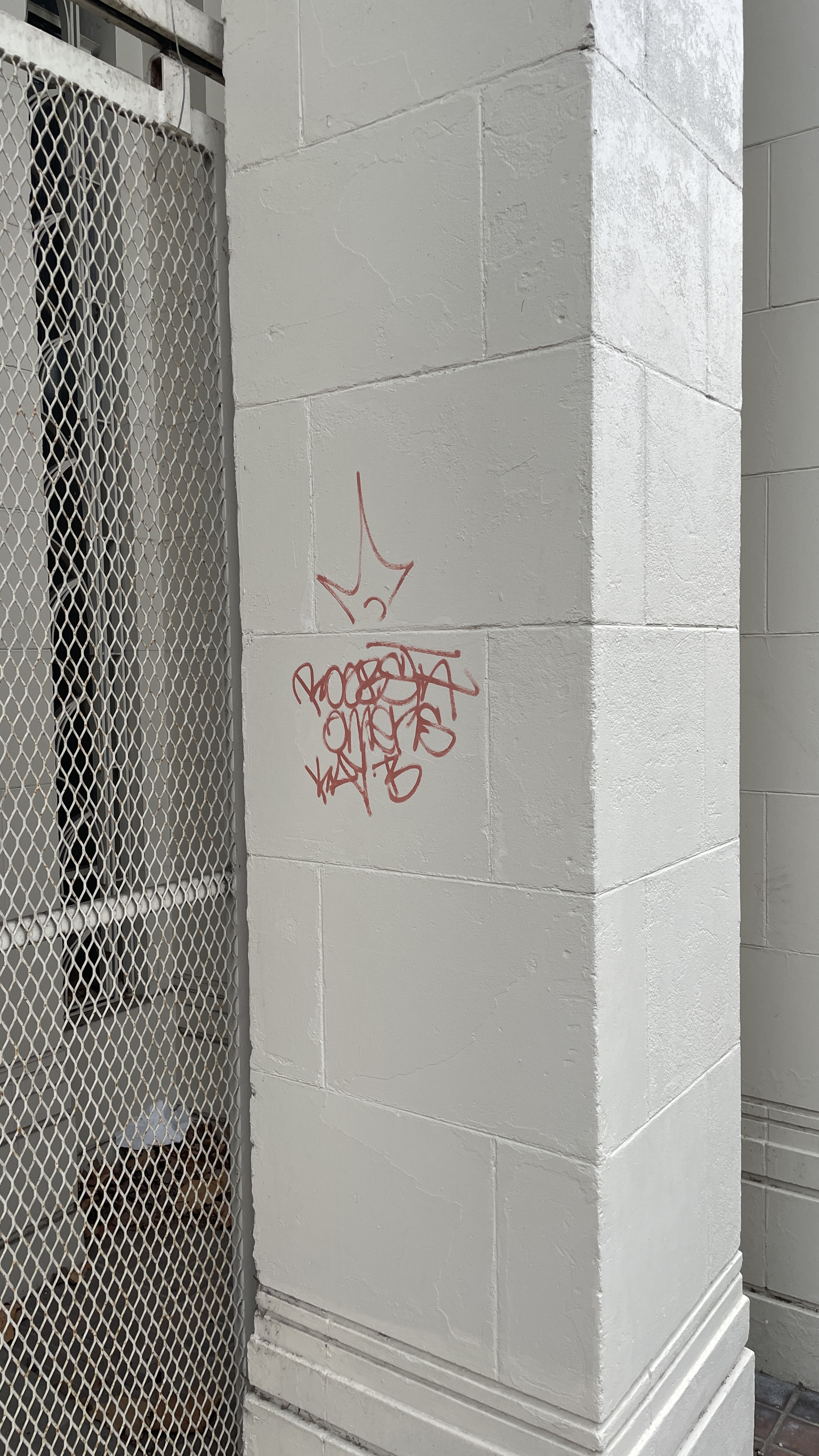
Graffiti Tag, July 2025

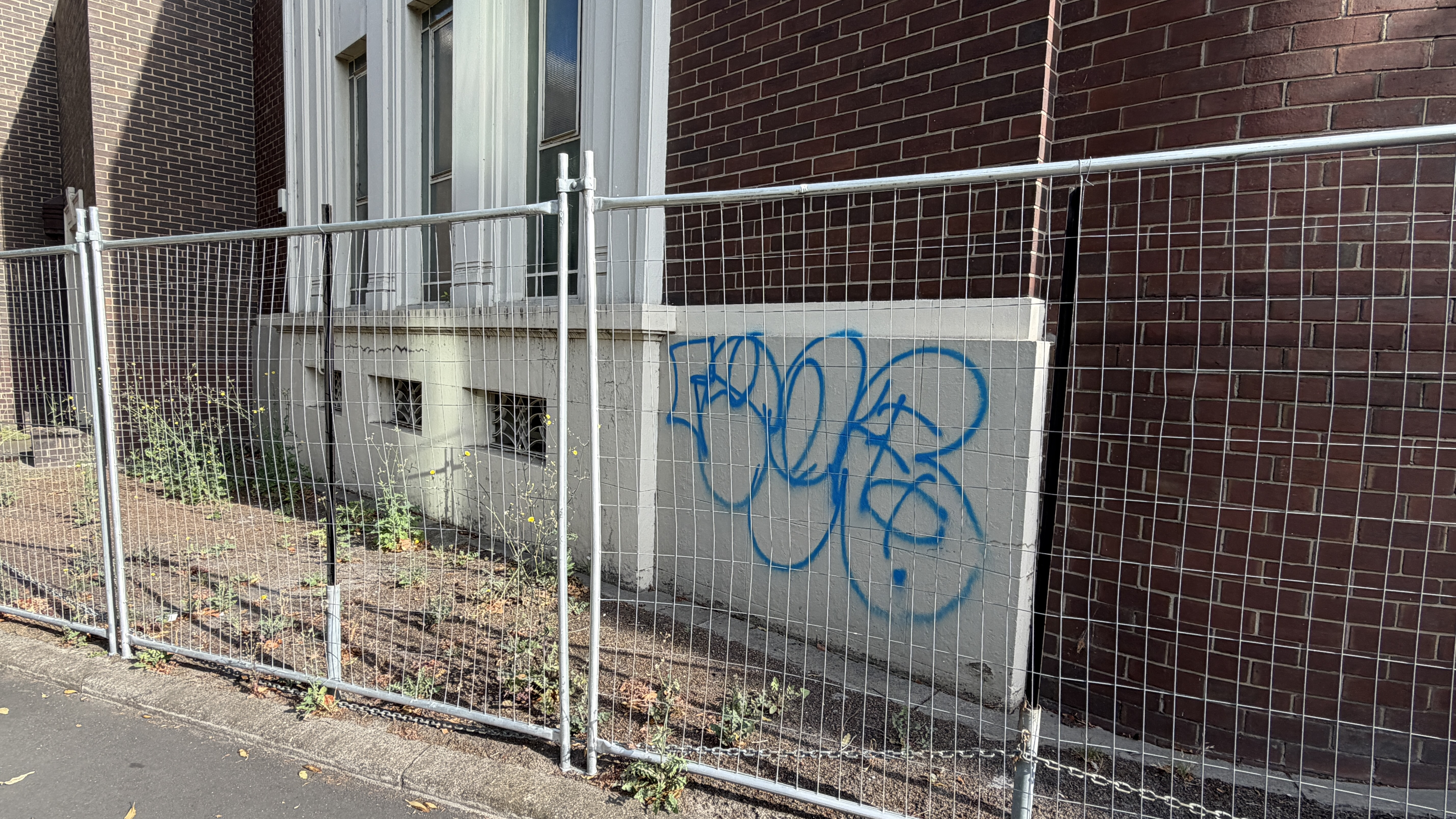
310 St Kilda Road graffiti - February 2026

On 9 October 2026 the former Repatriation Commission Outpatient Clinic was nominated by ANVAM for National Heritage Listing. The nomination was based on three criterion. A - history, B - rarity and G - social connection.

== The clinic's future ==
After the clinic had been sitting vacant for nearly three decades, the Shadow Minister for Veterans' Affairs, David Feeney, delivered an adjournment speech to the Australian House of Representatives on 26 March 2015 expressing his support for the proposal raised by the ex-service organisation and veterans charity, the Australian National Veterans Arts Museum (ANVAM) to turn the "unused building back to its original glory and once again help aid in repatriating our returned soldiers back into the community through the use of art rehabilitation". Within two months, on 6 May 2015, the Department of Defence added the Repatriation Clinic to its Disposal Program. On 22 June 2015 ANVAM wrote to the responsible Minister Darren Chester MP enquiring about the path available under the Commonwealth Property Disposal Policy (CPDP) that did not preclude an off-market sale to a non-Government entity in line with the precedent set also at Victoria Barracks in 1994 of the sale of land for $1 to a child care centre. Minister Chester's response discounting this option followed a change to the CPDP limiting off-market sales to other levels of government only.

The Australian Labor Party (ALP) released a policy on 17 June 2016 to turn the clinic into an Australian National Veterans Arts Centre (ANVAC) following lobbying by ANVAM.

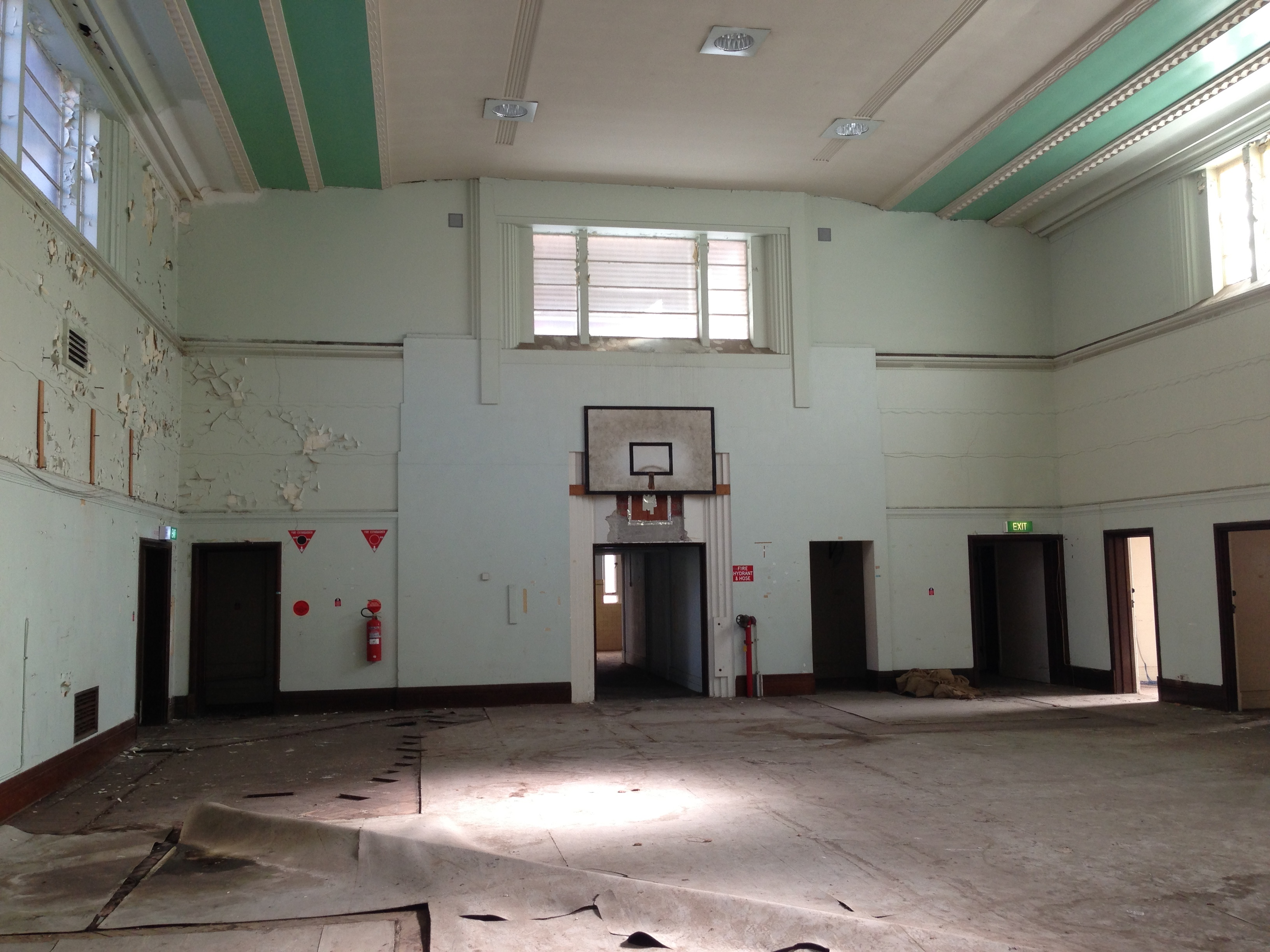
Repatriation Clinic waiting hall, circa 2013

In the same year the Department of Defence indicated the former Repatriation Clinic would be sold that attracted some political and media attention despite the Senate's view, expressed in a report published in September 2001, stating "6.18 Where a property has or is proposed to have a function associated with the military, such as a military museum or a cadet depot, the Australian Defence Organisation, including the new Defence Cadet Directorate (and not just DEO), should give special consideration to the continuation or commencement of such functions through priority or concessional sales".

The accepted national standard for heritage practice in Australia, the Australia ICOMOS Burra Charter, recognises that the cultural significance of a place may include social significance, the qualities for which a place has become a focus of cultural, national or community sentiment, in addition to aesthetic and historic values. Heritage Victoria's assessment of the clinic identifies its social significance explicitly, noting its enduring association with the contemporary Veteran Community. The 2004 Commonwealth Heritage List entry for the Victoria Barracks, Melbourne precinct, within which the clinic is listed, assesses significance against eight criteria including Criterion G (Social Value), against which the entry records that "Due to its 150 year association with defence and military history, and its place within inner Melbourne, Victoria Barracks has considerable social significance for both the military community and the general public.". Heritage Victoria's subsequent 2017 state-level assessment applied more narrowly to 310 St Kilda Road stated "The association between the Former Repatriation Outpatients Clinic and returned servicemen and women is particularly strong through the ongoing provision of medical services for more than forty years. This association is related to important historical events in Victoria, including World Wars I and II and later conflicts. This association is evident in the plan, detailing and design of the Former Repatriation Outpatients Clinic. The large waiting room was a meeting place for veterans and a place for their families to support and interact with one another socially. The clinic closed in 1980, but still retains a strong association with present day veterans, for whom the place holds an emotional connection to earlier generations of veterans. The building is highly intact and has the ability to interpret these experiences to the broader Victorian community".

Later in 2016 the Department of Defence indicated negotiations were underway to transfer the property to the State Government of Victoria. A nomination was submitted to Heritage Victoria for the listing of the Repatriation Clinic on the Victorian Heritage Register. A report (Ref: 200349) was prepared for the Victorian Heritage Council in May 2017 noting that "The Former Repatriation Outpatients Clinic has a special association with returned service personnel from conflicts since World War I. For present day returned personnel, the place provides a strong emotional connection to past veterans and their experiences of war trauma and disability". The report was not considered by the Council pending the outcome of the sale process. In February 2017 the Herald Sun reported that the Department of Defence was planning to put the property on the open market. At this time Senator Derryn Hinch became involved and through direct lobbying was able to prevent further progress toward a commercial sale in the expectation that the State Government could be convinced to make an offer for the property to support the proposal put forward by ANVAM.

A Change.org petition undertaken by ANVAM during 2017 to "Save the WW1 Heritage Building at 310 St Kilda Road to Help Veterans" attracted over 13,600 signatures supporting ANVAM's proposal to return it to the veteran community as a cultural centre for veterans wellbeing.

Amanda Rishworth, Shadow Minister for Veterans' Affairs, was particularly critical of the Turnbull Government on 14 February 2017 at the missed opportunity at the intention to sell the property, and later restated the Australian Labor Party's commitment to dedicating the property for veterans arts in April 2017.

As part of its community engagement program, ANVAM worked with RMIT interior design students in 2017 to envision potential designs for the clinic as a cultural institution with some projects presented online.

The future of the property was first raised in a Senate committee, Senate Estimates, by Senator Derryn Hinch on 1 March 2017 and further discussed, or raised through questions on notice (QoN), on the following dates:

1. 29 May 2017 Senator Alex Gallacher
2. 17 Nov 2017 Senator Don Farrell QoN
3. 25 Nov 2017 Senator Alex Gallacher
4. 28 Feb 2018 Senator Kimberley Kitching
5. 30 May 2018 Senator Alex Gallacher and Senator Kimberley Kitching
6. 24 Nov 2018 Senator Alex Gallacher
7. 23 Nov 2019 Senator David Van QoN
8. 23 Nov 2019 Senator Kimberley Kitching QON
9. 27 Oct 2021 Senator David Van.QoN
10. 16 Feb 2022 Senator David Van
11. 17 Feb 2022 Senator David Van
12. 1 Apr 2022 Senator David Van
13. 9 Nov 2022 Senator David Van
14. 9 Oct 2025 Senator David Shoebridge
15. 10 Feb 2026 Senator Jane Hume
16. 4 Sep 2026 Senator Jessica Collins
17. 22 Oct 2026 Senator David Shoebridge

ANVAM appeared before the Senate Foreign Affairs Defence and Trade Reference Committee on 18 May 2026 to give evidence about 310 St Kilda Road with respect to the enquiry into the Management of the Defence Estate, and following its submission to this enquiry.

In its response to Questions on Notice from the 30 May 2018 Senate Estimates, Defence indicated the sale is progressing in accordance with the Commonwealth Property Disposal Policy (CPDP). Defence also indicated the site was surplus to Defence requirements.

On 20 March 2019 the Assistant Minister for Defence, Senator David Fawcett, instructed the Department of Defence to progress the sale of property due to an apparent lack of interest of the State Government in the property three years after it was first invited to make an offer. When asked by Jon Faine on ABC Radio Melbourne on 25 March 2019, Darren Chester, Minister for Veterans' Affairs, indicated he was supportive of the initiative to establish a cultural institution for veterans wellbeing but unaware of the decision to sell the property despite his ministerial appointment. Senator Fawcett reversed the decision on 28 March 2019 prior to caretaker period for the 2019 federal election commencing on 10 April 2019 upon learning that the Melbourne City Council was in discussions with ANVAM over its proposed use of the site, and the benefits it would bring to the City of Melbourne.

As an expression of tri-party support the three primary candidates for the Division of Macnamara in the 2019 federal election, Josh Burns (ALP), Kate Ashmor (Liberal) and Steph Hodgins-May (Greens), publicly endorsed the initiative to create a cultural institution for veterans wellbeing during a community forum on 16 April 2019.

Amanda Rishworth released the Australian Labor Party's 2019 election veterans policy re-stating that "it is a site of significance for many in the veterans' and ex-serving community" and committing to its future for the benefit of the veteran community on 10 May 2019.

In April 2020 Melbourne City Council expressed interest in the property in order to support veterans through the proposal for a cultural institution. Following its July 2020 meeting Council indicated to Defence it was undertaking due diligence into the property.

Architectural firm ARM Architecture (company) prepared a concept design in June 2020 for ANVAM for the transformation of the clinic into a wellbeing focussed community arts and cultural institution. The concept design emphasised retaining heritage features, consistent with Heritage Victoria's recommendations to the Victorian Heritage Council, for the benefit of the veteran community and the original purpose of the property.

In response to a question on 9 December 2020 from Stuart Grimley MP during Question Time, Victorian Minister for Veterans, Shaun Leane MP, indicated that Melbourne City Council had some interest in purchasing the site and that he, as the State Veterans Minister, held considerable support to establish a veterans cultural institution in the property.

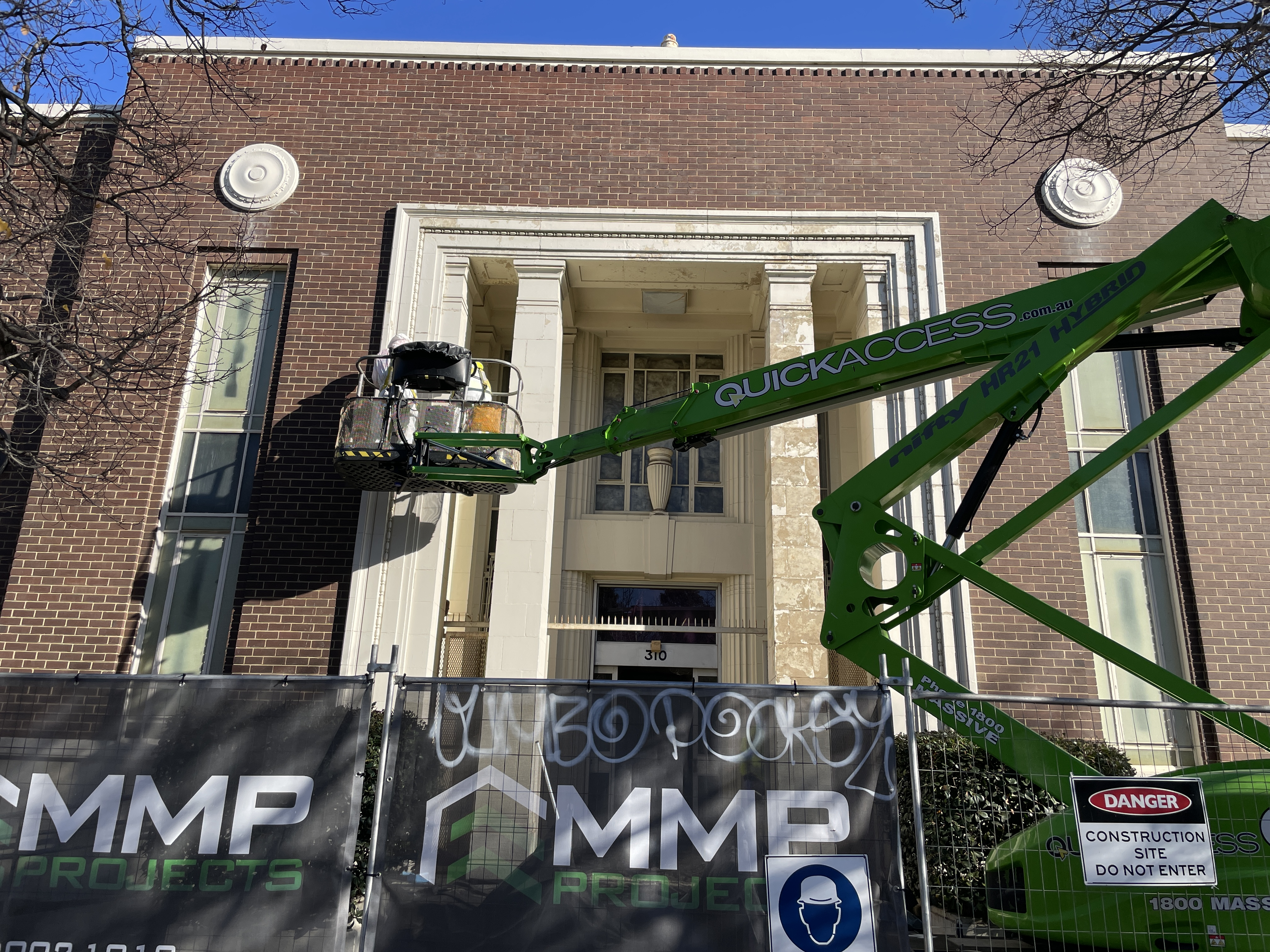
Repatriation Clinic remediation works, Jul 2022

During Senate Estimates on 27 October 2021, the Department of Defence revealed that Melbourne City Council has voted to decline the invitation to make an offer for an off-market concessional sale. Through a line of questions by Senator Van the point was made that Melbourne City Council was unable to progress with the sale, and therefore retention of the property in public ownership, due to the poor state of repair caused by the Department of Defence's management of the site since 1995 when it was last occupied. Senator Van asked the hypothetical question of the Department of Defence "what would it look like if it was turned into a block of apartments. What would the public perception of Defence be?". Later, in January 2022, Defence removed the property from the disposal list, with an announcement by Minister Melissa Price (politician) MP on 17 February 2022 that the federal government intended to invest in the property for Department of Defence (Australia) and veterans use. Architectural firm, Lovell Chen, was engaged to prepare a feasibility study to support the governments decision. Soon after a temporary fence was erected around the property and remediation works commenced with a budget of $17,854,214 under the estate works project EST08631.

Later in October 2022, the local newspaper, the Southbank News, reported that Minister Matt Thistlethwaite MP had determined the building would be used for offices and meeting rooms pointing out that this was a backflip to its pre-election support for its original 2016 policy.

Under Freedom of Information (FOI) a report prepared by Lovell Chen was released on 9 November 2022. The report presented three options for the adaptive reuse of the property including:

1. Offices
2. Conference Centre + Defence Community
3. Childcare Centre + Conference Centre + Offices

In each option at least 265m2 of car parking was included with Lovell Chen's view on the 'highest and best use' being Option 3. NB. The established 'One Tree Defence Childcare Unit' is 100m away on Coventry St. The EST08631 project was to implement option 2, a conference and Defence community centre.

Following the Defence Strategic Review in early 2023 the Federal Government commissioned an Independent Defence Estate Audit, which was completed at the end of 2023. This paused any consideration of the sites future pending the outcome of the audit, and government’s response to it. Prior to government’s response the Secretary for the Department of Defence, Greg Moriarty, toured the property in May 2024.

The Government released the Independent Defence Estate Audit on 4 February 2026, within which it was announced that the Repatriation Clinic, along with more than 60 other Defence sites, was to be sold at market value. The Clinic was identified separately to Victoria Barracks, Melbourne, of which it has been a part since 1980.

== Veterans' war service ==
Veterans who attended the Repatriation Clinic between 1937 and 1975 for medical and allied health support saw service in the following wars:

- Suakin Expedition of the New South Wales Contingent in the Sudan War (1885)
- Second Boer War (1899-1902)
- World War I (1915-1918)
- World War II (1939-1945)
- Korean War (1950-1953)
- Malayan Emergency (1950-1963)
- Vietnam War (1962-1972)

== Notable patients ==
Notable veterans who attended the Repatriation Clinic:

- GEN Sir Henry Harry Chauvel GCMG, KCB served in the Boer War and was a senior officer of the 1st AIF who led the Desert Mounted Corps during World War I.
- James Rogers (Australian soldier) VC was a Boer War and World War I veteran and Victoria Cross recipient from action during the Boer War.
- LTCOL James Newland VC served in the Boer War, World War I and World War II and Victoria Cross recipient from action in France during WWI.
- 20178 BDR Napier Waller CMG OBE was wounded while serving in France during World War I. He used art to rehabilitate later awarded Imperial Honours for services to art.
- VX16999 L/SGT Joseph (Joe) Newton who served as an RASigs linesman in Crete and Papua New Guinea during World War II. He is the father of TV personality Bert Newton.

== Staff ==
- Miss May Duggan, Sister-in-Charge, (1937-1942)
- Dr. J. V. Griffith
- Dr. R. S. Kennedy, Neurosis Specialist
- Sister M. Wallace
- Dr. G. C. Burston, (1949)

== Red Cross staff ==
- Mrs R. S. Hammerberg
- Mrs B. Ross
- Mrs W. E. Fyfe (original volunteer)
- Miss I. Haig (original volunteer)
