= Cerutty =

Cerutty is a surname. Notable people with the surname include:

- Charles Cerutty (1870–1941), Australian public servant
- Percy Cerutty (1895–1975), Australian athletics coach
