= Harold Clive Newman =

Australian public servant

Harold Clive Newman CBE

Commonwealth Auditor-General
- In office 1955–1961

Personal details
- Born: 5 June 1896 Charleston, South Australia
- Died: 7 December 1983 (aged 87)
- Occupation: Public servant

Harold Clive Newman CBE (5 June 1896 – 7 December 1983) was an Australian public servant who was Commonwealth Auditor-General between 1955 and 1961.

== Biography ==
Harold Clive Newman CBE was born in Charleston, South Australia on 5 June 1896 to George Charles Newman and his wife Maria Mary (née Carmichael). He went to school at Charleston and Lobethal and then to the Adelaide School of Mines. He started work as a relief telegraph messenger at Woodside Post Office in 1910 and made permanent on 26 August 1911. He claimed that the date of birth in his war records was a mistake. When war broke out in August, 1914 he joined the 9th Light Horse Regiment and he went ashore with it at Gallipoli on 20 May 1915 and served continuously on the peninsula until the last night of the evacuation 19–20 December 1915. After leave in Egypt to recuperate from the Dardanelles Campaign, he was wounded during the second battle of Gaza in 1917. He had an operation to remove a bullet from his elbow and discharged as medically unfit and returned to Australia.

After returning to Australia he helped to form the Returned Services League. An office bearer until his death, he was appointed a national trustee in 1955.

On 4 October 1919 at Pirie Street Methodist Church, Adelaide, he married Vesta Ward Deeble. They had two daughters and a son.

In 1919 Clive Newman transferred to the Department of Works and studied accountancy part-time. He served as accountant and chief clerk in Adelaide, Perth, Canberra and Sydney. He failed when attempting to enlist in the Army in 1939 and was later appointed Chief Finance Officer of the Defence Division of the Treasury at Victoria Barracks, Melbourne.

He was appointed Public Service Inspector for Western Australia after the war. He returned to Melbourne in 1947 as head of the Defence Division of the Treasury.

In 1954 he was appointed OBE (Civil Division) in the Queen’s birthday honours list for distinguished public service as Treasury representative on several defence committees.

In 1955 he was appointed Auditor-General of the Commonwealth, a post he held until he retired in 1961. At his retirement party, Newman and his wife were presented with a television set as a farewell present.

In 1960 Newman was promoted to Commander of the Order of the British Empire in recognition of his continued and distinguished public service.

He was a member of the Gallipoli Legion of Anzacs, the Royal Commonwealth Society, the Royal Canberra Golf Club and the Canberra Bowling Club.

He died on 7 December 1983 aged 87. He asked for a bugler to play the “Last Post” over the grave he had selected alongside his wife at Charleston, South Australia.

Government offices
Preceded by James Brophy	Commonwealth Auditor-General; 1955 – 1961	Succeeded by Vic Skermer
