= Vic Skermer =

Australian public servant

Vic Skermer CBE

Commonwealth Auditor-General
- In office 2 June 1961 – 8 May 1973

Personal details
- Born: Victor John William Skermer; 1908
- Died: November 1992 (aged 84) Canberra, Australian Capital Territory
- Resting place: Gungahlin Cemetery
- Spouse: Lilian Ruby Wilson
- Occupation: Public servant

Victor John William "Vic" Skermer CBE (1908 – November 1992) was an Australian public servant. He was Commonwealth Auditor-General between June 1961 and May 1973.

== Life and career ==
In 1925, Skermer joined the Commonwealth Public Service as a mechanic-in-training at the Postmaster-General's Department.

Prime Minister Robert Menzies announced Skermer's appointment as Auditor-General on 2 June 1961. The appointment was a promotion for Skermer from his position as Deputy Auditor-General. Between 1961 and 1971, the accounts and records of three new departments and 44 new statutory bodies came within the remit of Skermer's audits—a huge growth in the Auditor-General's auditing function.

Skermer retired in 1973, after 48 years of public service.

In November 1992, after several months of illness, Skermer died aged 84.

Government offices
Preceded by Harold Clive Newman	Commonwealth Auditor-General; 1961 – 1973	Succeeded by Duncan Robert Steele Craik
