= James Brophy (public servant) =

James Brophy ISO

Commonwealth Auditor-General
- In office 1951–1955

Personal details
- Born: 26 September 1889 South Melbourne, Victoria
- Died: 24 May 1969 (aged 79) Canberra, ACT
- Spouse: Elizabeth Constance Ridley
- Children: ten
- Occupation: Public servant

James Brophy ISO (26 September 1889 – 24 May 1969) was a public servant who was Commonwealth Auditor-General between 1951 and 1955.

== Biography ==
James Brophy was born on 26 September 1889 in South Melbourne, Victoria eldest child of Richard Brophy, labourer, and his wife Catherine, née Mackey, both from Ireland.

On 14 January 1922 he married Elizabeth Constance Ridley at St Brigid's Catholic Church, Red Hill, Brisbane. They had ten children. She died in 1965. They moved to Melbourne, Victoria in 1927 and to Canberra in 1930. He was appointed Papal Knight-Commander of the Order of St. Gregory the Great in 1951 by Pope Pius XII. He was awarded the Companion of the Imperial Service Order in the Queen's birthday honours list in 1954.

He was a life member of the NSW Hockey Association, NSW Junior Hockey Association, ACT Hockey Association and the NSW Amateur Swimming Association. He served as an official at the Rome Olympics and Perth Commonwealth Games in swimming. He was also involved with Australian Rules Football and was president of the Canberra Australian National Football Junior League from 1940 to 1942 and senior vice-president of the CANFL in 1941 and 1942. He was a foundation member of the National Eisteddfod Society.

He retired on 25 September 1955.

He died on 24 May 1969 at Canberra Hospital aged 79 and was buried at Canberra Cemetery.

Government offices
Preceded by Albert Charles Joyce	Commonwealth Auditor-General; 1951 – 1955	Succeeded by Harold Clive Newman
