= John William Israel =

Australian public servant (1850–1926)

John William Israel ISO

Commonwealth Auditor-General
- In office 1902–1926

Personal details
- Born: 4 July 1850 Launceston, Van Diemen's Land
- Died: 30 May 1926 (aged 75) Kew, Melbourne, Victoria
- Resting place: Box Hill Cemetery
- Spouse: Jane McDonald (m. 1883–1926)
- Occupation: Public servant

John William Israel ISO (4 July 1850 – 30 May 1926) was Commonwealth Auditor-General for the Australian Government between 1902 and 1926.

== Life and career ==
Israel was born in Launceston, Tasmania on 4 July 1850 to parents Adelaide Maria and John Cashmore Israel. He was schooled at the private academy of Abraham Barrett.

In 1870, Israel joined the Tasmanian Railway Service and was there when the Service was transferred to the government, becoming Tasmanian Government Railways. Israel transferred to the Tasmanian Audit Office in 1882.

Israel was appointed as Australia's first Commonwealth Auditor-General, leaving his appointment as State Auditor-General in Tasmania to take up the Australian Public Service position.

As Commonwealth Auditor-General, Israel oversaw the opening of special branch offices in all of the capital cities of Australia, with headquarters in Melbourne. His staff performed continuous audits at the Post Office and at Customs and period audits in every branch of the public service, including the Commonwealth Bank and the Government's military organisations.

Israel died of cancer at his residence in Kew, Melbourne on 30 May 1926.

== Awards ==
In 1916, Israel was awarded the distinction of the Imperial Service Order for his public service.

Government offices
New title Position established	Commonwealth Auditor-General; 1902 – 1926	Succeeded by Charles Cerutty
