= Albert Charles Joyce =

Commonwealth Auditor-General of Australia from 1946 to 1951

Albert Charles Joyce CBE

Commonwealth Auditor-General
- In office 1946–1951

Personal details
- Born: 22 May 1886 Melbourne, Victoria
- Died: 6 October 1973 (aged 87) Red Hill, Australian Capital Territory
- Spouse: Elsie Spicer
- Occupation: Public servant

Albert Charles Joyce CBE (22 May 1886 – 6 October 1973) was Commonwealth Auditor-General of Australia from 1946 to 1951.

== Biography ==
Albert Charles Joyce was born on 22 May 1886 in Melbourne, Victoria, to Albert Samuel Joyce and Ellen (née Carne). On 20 February 1908 he married Elsie Spicer and had 4 sons and two daughters. One son died in 1944 over Germany while serving with the RAAF.

Albert Joyce began working at the Auditor-General's office of the Public Service in 1903. He also worked for the PMG, the Department of Defence and the Department of the Treasury. He served as Auditor-General from 1946 to 1951.

He was a member of Rotary and the Masonic Lodge. He also became president of the Baptist Union of New South Wales.

His wife died in 1960.

He died on 6 October 1973 at Red Hill, Australian Capital Territory, ACT aged 87.

Government offices
Preceded by Ralph Abercrombie	Commonwealth Auditor-General; 1946 – 1951	Succeeded by James Brophy
