= Ralph Abercrombie (public servant) =

Australian public servant (1881–1957)

Ralph Abercrombie OBE

Commonwealth Auditor-General
- In office 1 September 1938 – 1946

Personal details
- Born: 19 July 1881 Mount Duneed, Victoria
- Died: 3 May 1957 (aged 75) Hawthorn, Victoria
- Parent(s): Andrew Thomson and Mary Anna (née Kenshole) Abercrombie
- Occupation: Public servant

Ralph Abercrombie OBE (19 July 1881 – 3 May 1957) was an Australian public servant who was Commonwealth Auditor-General from 1938 to 1946.

== Biography ==
Ralph Abercrombie CBE was born on 19 July 1881 at Mount Duneed, Victoria, Australia, the ninth child of Scottish born Andrew Thomson Abercrombie, the first headmaster of Mount Duneed State School and his English wife Mary Anna (née Kenshole).

He was the director of navy accounts and finance and civil member of the Naval Board. He joined the Navy Department in 1911 from the Victorian State Treasury. He was in charge of navy finance and accounting matters during World War 1. In 1923 the Government sent him to England on a special mission connected with the settlement of accounts associated with the repatriation of Australian troops. During that period he was attached to the Admiralty to obtain experience of Imperial accountancy organization. He was a member of the Commonwealth Institute of Accountants and a licensed auditor under the Victorian Companies Act. Under the Audit Act at the time he was employed, the salary of the Auditor-General was £1750 per annum.

He died on 3 May 1957 at his residence at Hawthorn, Melbourne, Australia.

== Awards ==
Abercrombie was appointed an Officer of the Order of the British Empire on 3 June 1935, in recognition of his service as Director of Navy Accounts.

Government offices
Preceded by Herbert Charles Brown	Commonwealth Auditor-General; 1938–1946	Succeeded by Albert Charles Joyce
