= James Rogers (Australian soldier) =

Recipient of the Victoria Cross

Captain James Rogers VC
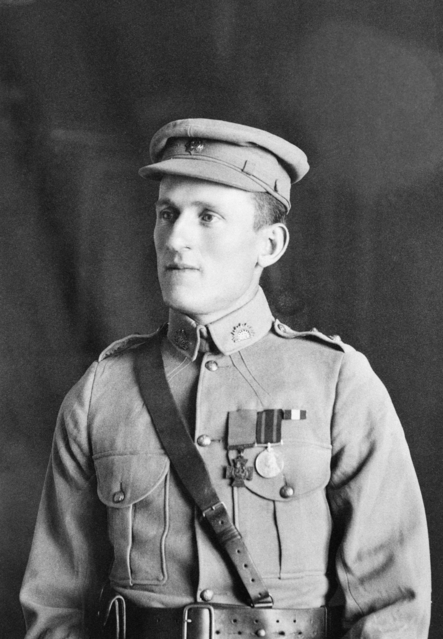
- Lieutenant James Rogers
- Born: 4 July 1873; Moama, New South Wales
- Died: 28 October 1961 (aged 88); Sydney, New South Wales
- Military career
- Allegiance: Australia
- Branch: Victorian Mounted Rifles; South African Constabulary; Australian Imperial Force
- Service years: 1898–1902; 1914–1916
- Rank: Captain
- Conflicts: Second Boer War; First World War; Gallipoli Campaign
- Awards: Victoria Cross; Mentioned in Despatches
- Other work: Farmer

James Rogers, VC (4 July 1873 – 28 October 1961) was an Australian recipient of the Victoria Cross, the highest award for gallantry in the face of the enemy that can be awarded to British and Commonwealth forces. Rogers received his award for his actions at Thaba 'Nchu in Orange Free State on 15 June 1901 while serving in the South African Constabulary during the Second Boer War.

== Early life ==
James Rogers was born on 4 July 1873 in Moama, New South Wales, the son of John Rogers, a Welsh-born farmer, and his wife Sarah Louisa, née Johnstone, from Sydney. In 1886 his family moved to Heywood, Victoria, where he worked on his father's farm.

== Military service ==
Rogers joined a local company of the Victorian Mounted Rifles in 1898. Following the outbreak of the Second Boer War he enlisted as a private in the 1st Victorian Mounted Infantry Company. He subsequently arrived at Cape Town in South Africa in November 1899, where his contingent was allocated to a composite Australian regiment which served in the Cape Colony and Orange River. In May 1900 he was seconded to the Provincial Mounted Police in Orange River Colony as a corporal. Rogers subsequently remained in South Africa at the conclusion of his period of service, joining the South African Constabulary. He was 26 years old, and a sergeant in the South African Constabulary, South African Forces when the following deed took place for which he was awarded the Victoria Cross.

On the 15th June, 1901, during a skirmish near Thaba'Nchu, a party of the rearguard of Captain Sitwell's column, consisting of Lieutenant F. Dickinson, Sergeant James Rogers, and 6 men of the South African Constabulary, was suddenly attacked by about 60 Boers. Lieutenant Dickinson's horse having been shot, that Officer was compelled to follow his men on foot. Sergeant Rogers seeing this, rode back, firing as he did so, took Lieutenant Dickinson up behind him, and carried him for half-a-mile on his horse. The Sergeant then returned to within 400 yards of the enemy, and carried away, one after the other, two men who had lost their horses, after which he caught the horses of two other men, and helped the men to mount. All this was done under a very heavy rifle fire. The Boers were near enough to Sergeant Rogers to call upon him to surrender; his only answer was to continue firing.

After returning to Australia in late 1901 Rogers was commissioned as a lieutenant in the 6th Battalion, Australian Commonwealth Horse, and embarked for South Africa again on 19 May 1902. Following the conclusion of the war his battalion returned to Australia, and he received his Victoria Cross from the acting governor-general, Lord Tennyson, on 18 September 1902 at Government House, Melbourne. He had previously been mentioned in despatches. Rogers then unsuccessfully sought to obtain a commission in the Australian Military Forces and, after buying and selling a property near Yea, Victoria, returned to South Africa where he worked as detective with the Cape Police until February 1904. On 25 April 1907, Rogers married Ethel Maud Seldon at Portland, Victoria and they later had two sons.

Following the outbreak of the First World War, Rogers was appointed as a lieutenant with the 3rd Light Horse Brigade Train, Australian Army Service Corps. He was wounded at Anzac Cove on Gallipoli on 4 August 1915, and after recovering in hospital in Egypt later served in the Anzac Provost Corps before being returned to Australia for medical reasons in June 1916. Although his appointment in the Australian Imperial Force was terminated on 31 December 1916, he continued to serve on home duties as a captain until the end of the conflict. He subsequently transferred to the reserves on 1 June 1922.

== Later life ==
Rogers later worked as a grazier, running a property in the Mallee district in Victoria, before moving to Kew in Melbourne where he lived for 30 years. While living in Kew he had a series of accidents including a fall in his garden resulting in a broken leg for which he was treated at the Heidelberg Repatriation Hospital. He later sprained his ankle. Rogers was treated at the Repatriation Commission Outpatient Clinic with physio-therapy on 9 April 1948 for an old wound he sustained to his back.

Following the death of his wife he moved to Roseville in Sydney. He died on 28 October 1961, in Concord Repatriation Hospital, Sydney. He was buried in Springvale Cemetery, Victoria. His Victoria Cross is displayed at the Australian War Memorial, Canberra.

== Honours and awards ==

Ribbon	Description	Notes
Ribbon for Victoria Cross	Victoria Cross (VC)	gazetted 1902
Ribbon for the QSAM	Queen's South Africa Medal	with 3 clasps: CAPE COLONY, ORANGE FREE STATE, and SOUTH AFRICA 1901
Ribbon for the KSAM	King's South Africa Medal	with 2 clasps: SOUTH AFRICA 1901 and SOUTH AFRICA 1902
ribbon for the 1914–15 Star	1914–15 Star	
Ribbon for the BWM	British War Medal	
Ribbon for the Victory Medal	Victory Medal	
Ribbon for the George VI Coronation Medal	King George VI Coronation Medal	
Ribbon for the QE2 Coronation Medal	Queen Elizabeth II Coronation Medal	
