= Victoria Barracks, Melbourne =

Victoria Barracks
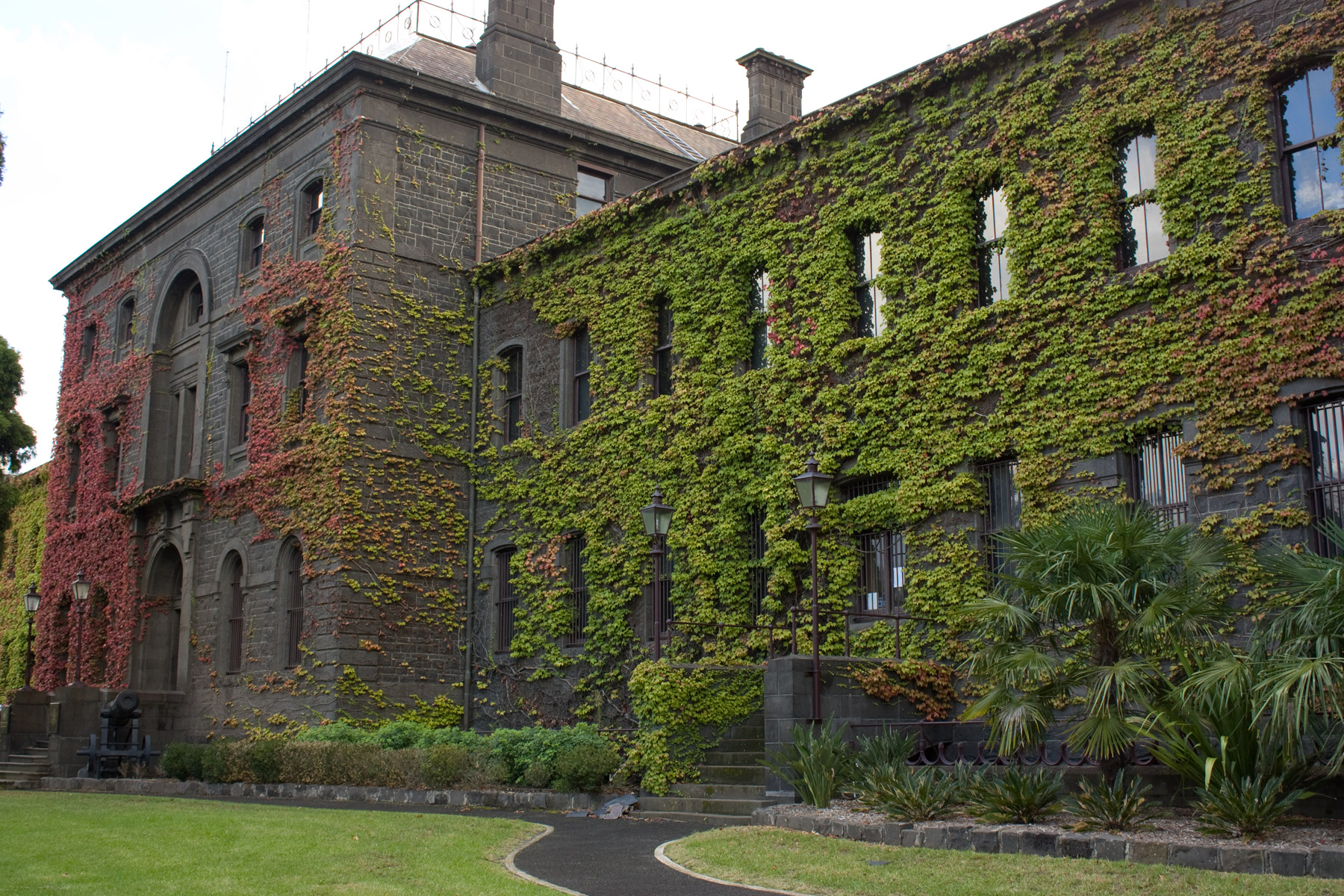
- Interactive map of the Victoria Barracks area

General information
- Architectural style: Renaissance Revival
- Location: Melbourne, Australia
- Coordinates: 37.827391°S 144.970447°E
- Construction started: 1856
- Completed: 1872

Victoria Barracks Melbourne is an Australian Government building located on St Kilda Road in Melbourne, Australia. It was constructed in the mid-to-late 19th century as barracks for British colonial forces in Australia and was the headquarters of the Department of Defence from 1901 to 1953, also housing Australia's war cabinet during World War II. It is still used as a Department of Defence administrative centre in the present day.

== History ==
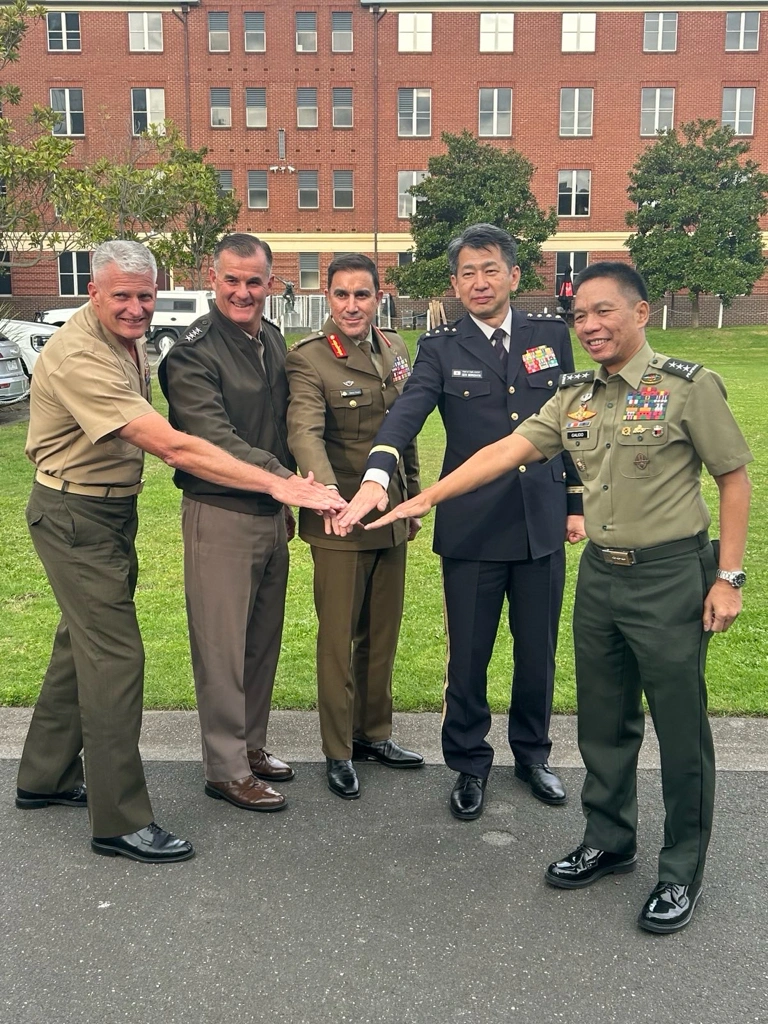
US Army Pacific commanding general Charles A. Flynn and III MEF commander Roger B. Turner meets chief of the Australian Army Simon Stuart and Japanese Chief of JGSDF Morishita Yasunori at Victoria Barracks in Melbourne

Victoria Barracks was originally built as accommodation for British troops, including the 12th and 40th Regiment of Foot who were involved in putting down the armed Eureka Stockade rebellion in Ballarat, Victoria, and later the Colony of Victoria's colonial forces. The earliest building (G Block) at Victoria Barracks was built by soldiers of the 40th Regiment, under the supervision of a Royal Engineer officer, from 1856 to 1858, while the remaining buildings were built by civil contractors with the original bluestone buildings between 1856 and 1872.

The Barracks housed the Department of Defence following the Federation of Australia in 1901. A large extension, A Block New Wing, was added to accommodate the Department of Defence in 1917; while it looked like the original A Block building, the construction method and interior were completely modern for the time.

In 1936 the Repatriation Commission took control of a parcel of land on the corner of St Kilda Road and Coventry Street to establish the Repatriation Commission Outpatient Clinic, which opened on 15 November 1937. The day clinic was designed by Commonwealth architect George Hallendal in an Art Deco style for World War I veterans.

Another modern art deco building, M Block, was added in 1939 and the floor was the first continuous concrete pour in Australia. The Barracks were named in honour of Queen Victoria. There are also Victoria Barracks in Sydney and Brisbane.

During World War II, Victoria Barracks Melbourne housed the Australian War Cabinet, composed of senior MP's from the Government and Opposition parties. The Defence Secretariat occupied the second floor of A Block New Wing which also contained the office of senior military staff, the Secretary of the Department Defence (Sir Frederick Shedden), visiting Ministers of State and their secretaries and support staff, and the War Cabinet room. The wartime Prime Ministers (Robert Menzies and later John Curtin) also had offices near the War Cabinet Room throughout the war.

Eric Nave's Navy cryptographic unit was at Victoria Barracks until it moved to FRUMEL.

Myth has it that the United States Army General Douglas MacArthur had an office at the barracks; however this is not true as his HQ was at the Hotel Australia in the Melbourne CBD. It was in fact General Sir Thomas Blamey who had his HQ at the barracks while serving as Commander-in-Chief, Australian Military Forces, and simultaneously in international command as Commander-in-Chief Allied Land Forces in the South-West Pacific Area under MacArthur.

== Present day ==
Victoria Barracks Melbourne currently accommodates:

- Land Systems Division (LSD) of the Capability Acquisition and Sustainment Group
- The ten Systems Program Offices (SPO) (business units) of LSD
- Elements of Joint Logistics Command (JLC)
- Elements of Estate and Infrastructure Group (E&IG)
- Senior Naval Officer - Victoria (SNO-Vic)

Non-Defence organisations within Victoria Barracks include:

- Royal United Services Institute (RUSI) library in B-Block
- Defence Force Welfare Association (DFWA) in H-Block
- Ventia Defence contractors providing support services to Defence
- Australian Military Bank in H-Block
- Defence Bank in H-Block
- Australian Federal Police detachment

A number of facilities within Victoria Barracks are named after notable military events, people or places. These include:

- Shedden Auditorium (after Sir Frederick Shedden)
- War Cabinet Room (used as the main conference room for the World War II War Cabinet)
- Blamey Room (after Field Marshal Sir Thomas Blamey GBE, KCB, CMG, DSO, ED)
- Tresco Room (after the Tresco Estate, the Royal Australian Navy's premier residence in Sydney)

On 15 August 1994 a parcel of land from Victoria Barracks was sold at a concessional rate to Defence and ABC Child Care Association Incorporated (ABN 42996351638) for $1.

The former Repatriation Commission Outpatient Clinic built prior to World War II was handed back to Defence in 1980 and was used as the Maintenance Engineering Agency (MEA) until December 1995. The former Repatriation Clinic has been empty since 1995. The Department of Defence indicated in May 2015 the former Repatriation Clinic would be sold. After several attempts to sell the property commercially, and via off market sale to the State Government of Victoria and then City of Melbourne failed the property was withdrawn from the disposal list in February 2022.
