= Lovell Chen =

Australian architectural practice

Practice information
- Firm type: architects and heritage consultants
- Founders: Peter Lovell, Kai Chen
- Founded: 1981 as Allom Lovell & Associates, 2005 as Lovell Chen
- Location: Melbourne, Australia

Website
- www.lovellchen.com.au

Lovell Chen is an architectural practice and heritage consultancy founded by Peter Lovell and Kai Chen in Melbourne, Victoria, Australia. Founded in 1981 as Allom Lovell & Associates, the practice became Lovell Chen in 2005. They are known for their heritage, conservation and strategic planning work, and latterly for architecture. The practice Principals are Kai Chen, Kate Gray, Peter Lovell, Adam Mornement, Anne-Marie Treweeke, Milica Tumbas and Katherine White.

== History ==
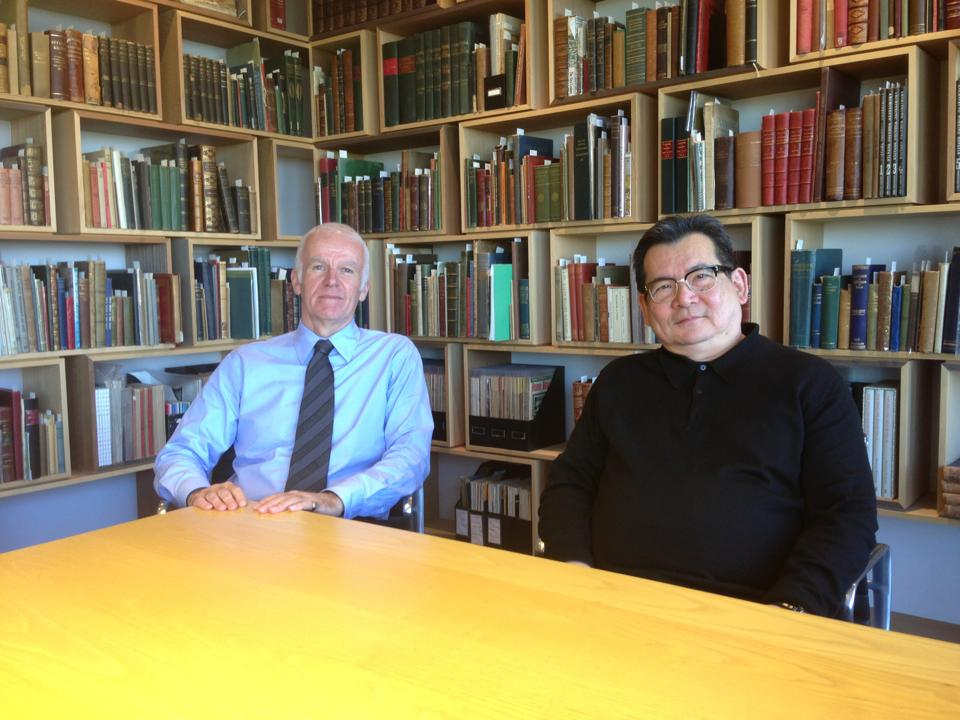
Left: Peter Lovell, Right: Kai Chen

=== Peter Lovell ===
Peter Lovell graduated Melbourne University with a Bachelor of Building in 1976. Following this he went on to do two years post graduate study focused on research into low cost housing and adaptation and reuse of old buildings – particularly the technical aspect of reuse. Following this he spent 6 months in private practice working for Peter Elliot and then a short piece of work for Guilford Bell. Within 12 months of finishing postgraduate studies he went on to set up his own practice as a specialist in building conservation in Niagara Lane, Melbourne CBD. This office consisted of a collaborative of young practices including Peter Elliot, Gary Boag and John McNabb, all able to support each other in the early days of establishment. This was started in 1979 and ran until 1981. In 1981 he went on to form a partnership with Richard Allom, a Brisbane-based architect to form an architectural practice with offices in Melbourne and Brisbane. The Melbourne office was focused on building conservation works in providing advice on restoration in buildings. The Brisbane office was a mix of architecture and conservation work. The aim for the two offices was to provide services across the eastern seaboard including Brisbane, Sydney, Canberra and Melbourne. The practice slotted in at a time where there was great interest in conservation work that arose in the late 70’s early 80’s and grew throughout these years. Commissions specialising in the interior such as finishes, paintwork and decorative work were achieved such as the Windsor Hotel, the Royal Exhibition Building, Parliament House, Princess Theatre, the Melbourne Town Hall and a number of defence projects including the fort at Queenscliff throughout the 80s and early 90s. In specialising in conservation the firm consisted of two parts – a research based part and applied architectural works.

==== Kai Chen ====
Kai Chen graduated from Melbourne University with a Bachelor of Architecture (Hons) degree. Prior to Lovell Chen he worked with Ian Robinson in a practice called Robinson Chen in 1981. This practice consisted of a small studio of architects as well as the builders who completed the projects. Over the next 10 years he worked on a number of residential projects that became internationally recognized and collaborated with many different architects and practitioners. Over the course of this time he worked on roughly 40 residential buildings. While undertaking these projects he also taught at University.

=== Formation ===
In 1991 Chen and Lovell met when they were collaborating on a project in the Dandenongs. Lovell was the heritage consultant for the project while Chen was the designer. The same year Chen joined Lovell while they were working on major additions to Government House in Canberra and the Governor General's residence. Chen came on board as design leader and architect. Until Chen joined, the practice had been mainly concerned with heritage consultancy and restorative commissions, and limited in the amount of architectural works. The plan was to bring contemporary architecture into a heritage practice and combine conservation and design. Once Chen became a part of the practice they were able to pursue these interface issues and expand the office. From 1991 they worked together and then formed the partnership that is Lovell Chen in 2005.

== Notable projects ==
Notable architecture, conservation and heritage projects by Lovell Chen:

=== 1983-2020 Royal Exhibition Building (restoration, conservation, architecture, strategic and heritage planning) ===
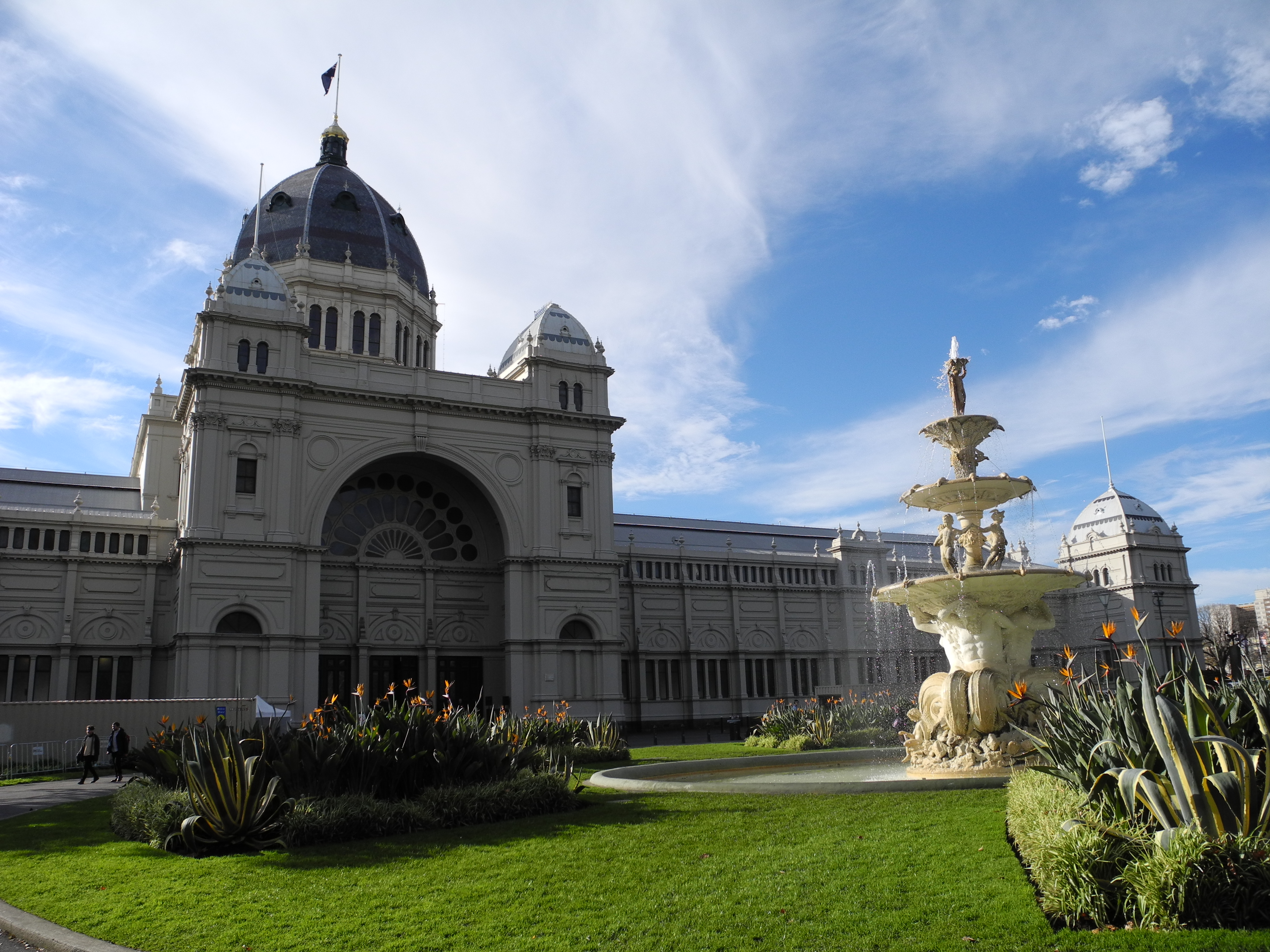
Royal Exhibition Building

Original architect: Joseph Reed (architect), constructed 1870-1880.

Lovell Chen has been providing heritage and architectural services for this building and its surrounding gardens for a period of over 40 years. Works include north facade re-building, re-roofing, fabric stabilisation, dome works, facade conservation, detailed interior restoration, adaptive re-use projects, heritage management planning, forecourt restoration and re-opening of the Dome Promenade. Inscribed on the UNESCO World Heritage List (2004).

=== 1989-2018 Flinders Street Station (conservation, heritage services) ===
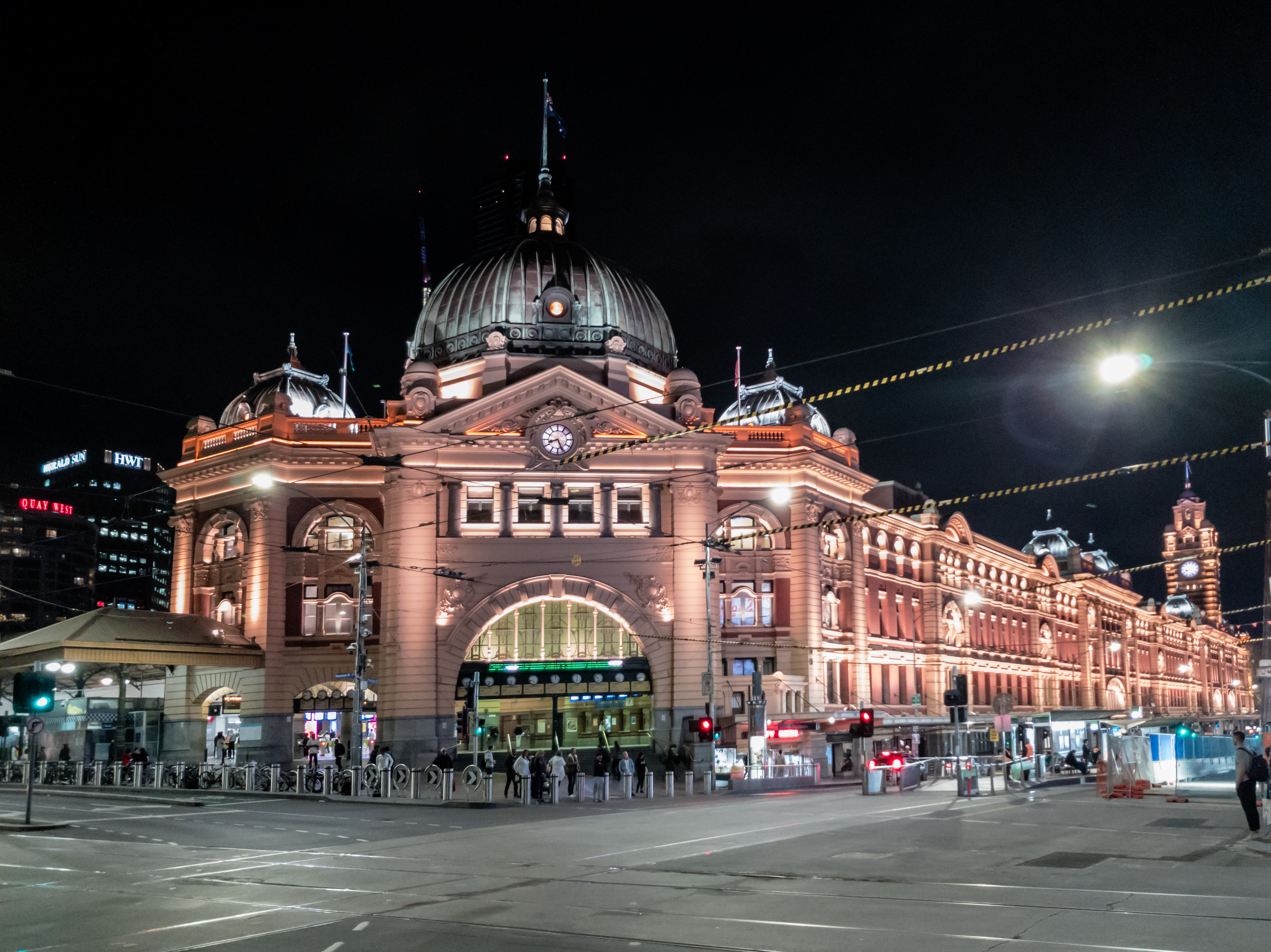
Flinders Street Station, Melbourne

Original architect: James Fawcett and H.P. Ashworth of the Railways Department, constructed 1902-1910.

The practice also has a long association with Melbourne's main station. In 2018, the first phase of a government-funded revitalisation project was completed. Works included seismic strengthening, structural repairs, a new insulated roof system, clock tower works, a new stormwater drainage system, and brickwork, render, pressed metal and joinery repairs. The exterior has been returned to its 1910 colour scheme.

=== 1993-1996, then 2018-2019 Regent Theatre, Melbourne (restoration, conservation, adaptation) ===
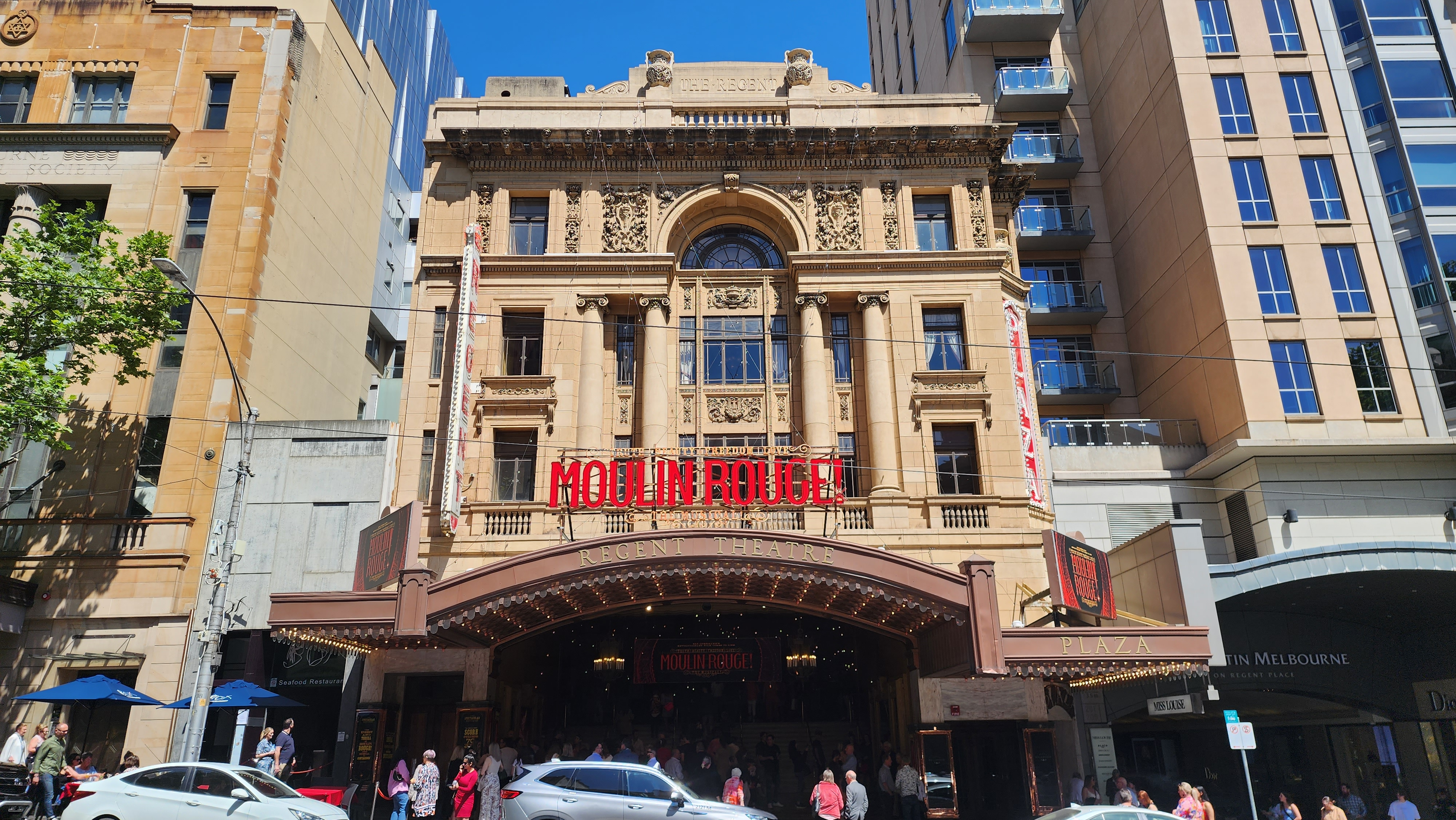
Regent Theatre, Collins Street, Melbourne

Original architect: Cedric Henry Ballantyne, constructed late 1920s. Fire damage 1945. Reopened 1947, architect: Cowper, Murphy & Appleford.

Major restoration and reconstruction undertaken in 1996 followed 25 years of neglect for the spectacular Regent Theatre, originally constructed as a cinema. In 2019, Lovell Chen completed further works, including major structural changes in the auditorium, bringing the Dress Circle closer to the stage and opening the foyer bars onto the rear of the Stalls, which has been re-raked - but you'd never know, as the interior detailing has been seamlessly replicated.

=== 1995-2015 State Library Of Victoria (strategic planning, conservation, architecture, heritage services) ===
Original architect: Joseph Reed, constructed 1854-1980s.

A series of projects have been undertaken at the State Library of Victoria in the last 20 years, including strategic planning, concept design for adaptive reuse and conservation works. Most recently, major facade conservation and works to the exterior of the dome drum were carried out.

=== 2005-2011 Australia Post National Heritage Strategy (heritage services) ===
As part of ongoing strategic heritage work with Australia Post, Lovell Chen carried out a nation-wide survey of its properties. It owns more than 520 and leases many more. Assessments determined which have heritage value, and 50 places were subsequently nominated for inclusion in the Commonwealth Heritage List.

=== 2011-2014 Circus Oz (architecture, adaptation) ===
Lovell Chen created a new permanent home for Circus Oz, including trapeze rehearsal space, by adapting part of the former Collingwood Technical School. Areas at the centre of the original building complex were removed and new areas constructed as required, roofing over the in-between spaces. Bold, playful, flexible and functional.

=== 2012-2013 Melbourne GPO exterior works (conservation) ===
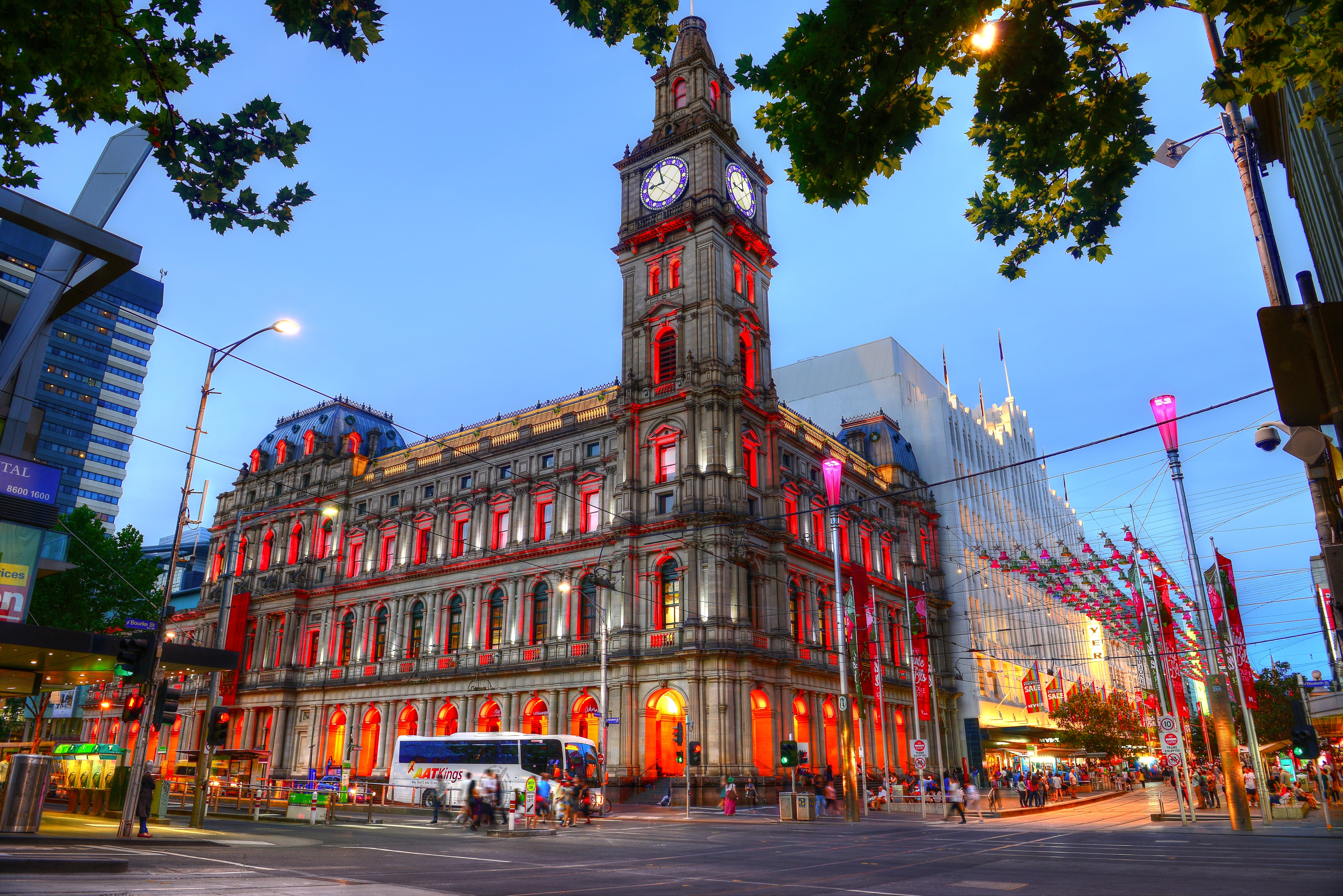
Melbourne GPO

Original architects: William Wardell, Arthur E. Johnson, constructed 1859, alterations 1919 (Walter Burley Griffin, J.S. Murdoch).

The exterior of Melbourne's grand 19th century former General Post Office) was restored and conserved by Lovell Chen following severe fire damage to the building in 2001 and a change of use. Stonework repair and stabilisation. Major roof works, including sheet lead and supporting timbers, and re-cladding all the cornices. Described at the time as the largest leadwork project in the country.

=== 2013-2018 Bendigo Soldiers' Memorial Institute (architecture, conservation) ===
Original architect: George Dawson Garvin, constructed 1921.

Conservation works to Bendigo's war memorial, home to a museum and the local club rooms of the RSL), plus a new pavilion/extension to the rear - viewed in the round in a parkland setting. The two-level pavilion is a contemporary, weathering steel-clad interpretation of an arcaded loggia. Certified Passive House, the extension has AA-standard gallery space at its heart. First government building in Australia constructed to Passive House standard.

=== 2014-2016 Wade Institute of Entrepreneurship (architecture) ===
In the grounds of Ormond College, the University of Melbourne. An L-shaped teaching building designed using Passive House principles, constructed on the site of tennis courts, which have been 'raised' to form the roof of the new structure. Realised in collaboration with industrial design group Design Sense and irwinconsult engineer Phil Gardner. Flexible open spaces lie between the monolithic exposed floor and roof slabs, the latter seemingly floating on minimal steel-cage columns.

=== 2015-2019 Old Quad Redevelopment (strategic planning, architecture, conservation) ===
Original architect (north and east wings): Francis Maloney White, constructed 1856 (north wing), 1857 (east wing).

Following the development of a master plan by Lovell Chen from which was derived a staged programme of works, Melbourne University’s Old Quad is being re-established as the centre of campus civic, cultural and ceremonial life. In 2019, Lovell Chen completed adaptation and refurbishment works to the North Wing, north end of the East Wing and the North Annexe, using Passive House principles - the first application in Australia of the adaptive reuse model Passivhaus EnerPHit to a building of state heritage significance.

=== 2015-2020 Victorian Trades Hall, Melbourne (architecture, conservation, restoration, reconstruction, heritage services) ===
Original architect: Reed and Barnes et al, construction commenced 1874 (nine further stages).

One of the world's oldest trade union buildings (Victorian Trades Hall), and still in use as the home of unionism in Victoria. Phase one of redevelopment was completed in 2019, returning its central chamber (Solidarity Hall) to its original orientation and proportions, restoring the Old Council Chamber (1884), conserving the fabric of the main public spaces, making roof repairs and improving circulation routes.

=== 2019-2020 Federation Square Management Framework (heritage management planning) ===
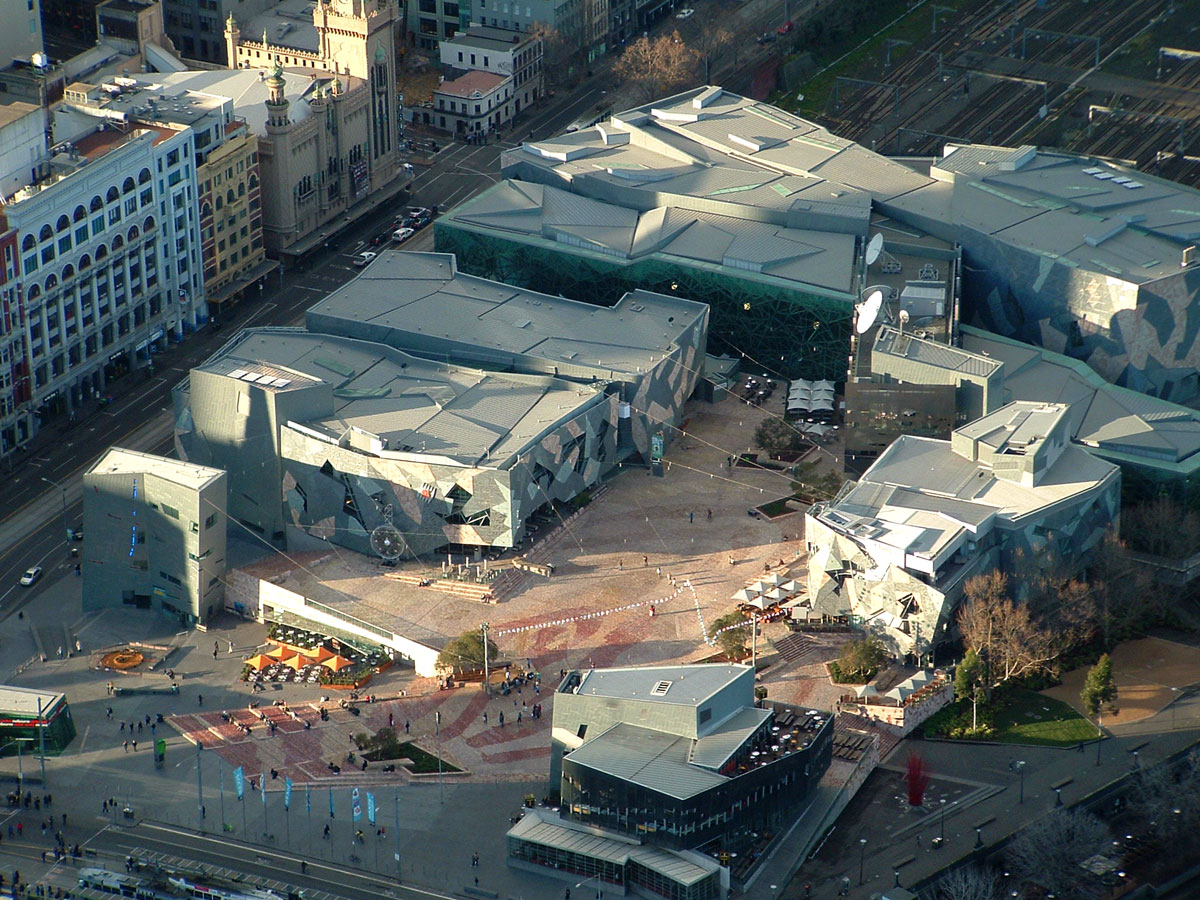
Federation Square, Melbourne

Original architect: Lab Architecture Studio, constructed 1997-2004.

The first place completed in the 21st century in Australia to be managed under a statutory heritage regime. Lovell Chen developed a conservation framework, researching the original architects' theoretical approach to design and creating a heritage plan that embraces the capacity for change embedded in the conceptual rationale.

== Awards ==
The practice has received many awards:

- 2020: Australian Urban Design Award: Leadership, Advocacy and Research - local and neighbourhood scale, for ANU Acton Campus Master Plan, in association with Arup, Urban Enquiry, Mantra Studios, Karen Wright Projects, John Wardle Architects, Turnberry Consulting
- 2020: AIA (Victoria) Architecture Award: Sustainable Architecture for Old Quad redevelopment, the University of Melbourne
- 2020: AIA (Victoria) Architecture Award: Conservation for Trades Hall Melbourne
- 2020: AIA (Victoria) Architecture Award: Heritage Architecture - creative adaptation, for Regent Theatre, Melbourne
- 2019: National AIA Award: National commendation for Heritage, for Flinders Street Station facade strengthening and conservation
- 2019: AIA (Victoria) Architecture Award: Conservation category for Flinders Street Station facade strengthening and conservation
- 2019: AIA (Victoria) Architecture Award: Heritage and sustainability shortlistings for Bendigo Soldiers' Memorial Institute
- 2019: PIA Award for Planning Excellence (ACT): Best Planning Ideas commendation (small project) for ANU Acton Campus Master Plan, in association with Arup, Urban Enquiry, Mantra Studios, Karen Wright Projects, John Wardle Architects, Turnberry Consulting
- 2019: Dulux Colour Award: Commercial and multi-residential category for Flinders Street Station facade strengthening and conservation
- 2018: Premier's Sustainability Award: Heritage category : Built environment category finalist, Bendigo Soldiers' Memorial Institute
- 2014: AIA (Victoria) Architecture Award: John George Knight Award for Heritage Architecture for Melbourne GPO exterior conservation works
- 2014: AIA (Victoria) Architecture Award: Heritage commendation for Rippon Lea roof reinstatement
- 2014: Western Australian Heritage Award: The Gerry Gauntlett Award : excellence in adaptive reuse for ONE40WILLIAM
- 2013: AIA (Victoria) Architecture Award: Heritage category : commendation for Ormond College Gables Project
- 2012: AIA (Victoria) Architecture Award: Public Architecture : alterations and additions for Melbourne University Boatshed Extension
- 2010: The Planning Minister's Heritage Award in association with Equiset and Elenberg Fraser for Railway Goods Shed North (Goods Shed No 2), Melbourne
- 2010: Property Council of Australia Award: Innovation & Excellence Award : Heritage & Adaptive Reuse in association with Equiset and Elenberg Fraser for Railway Goods Shed North (Goods Shed No 2), Melbourne
- 2010: AIA (Victoria) Architecture Award: Residential Architecture : alterations and additions for the Farfor Flats units 1 & 2
- 2009: Architecture & Design Excellence in the South East Award: Outstanding Building Conservation commendation: the Medical Superintendent's House at the former Point Nepean Quarantine Station
- 2004: John George Knight Heritage Architecture Award: in association with Ashton Raggatt McDougall for the Shrine of Remembrance Undercroft Development
- 2004: RAIA (Victoria) Architecture Award: John George Knight Award : Heritage category for the Beaurepaire Centre pool
- 2004: RAIA : The Lachlan Macquarie Award: joint winner for the Beaurepaire Centre pool
- 2002: Indigo Shire Council Award: Preservation & Restoration of Historic Government Buildings commendation for Government House Telegraph Office Sub Treasury and Beechworth Shire Offices and landscaping
- 2002: RAIA (Victoria) Architecture Award: John George Knight Award: Heritage category for the Royal Exhibition Building
- RAIA Award: Heritage category : commendation for Harricks Homestead
- 1999: RAIA (Victoria) Architecture Award: John George Knight Award: in association with Daryl Jackson Pty Ltd for the Immigration Museum & Hellenic Archaeology Museum
- 1999: RAIA (Victoria) Architecture Award: The Melbourne Prize : commendation: in association with Daryl Jackson Pty Ltd for the Immigration Museum & Hellenic Archaeology Museum
- 1998: RAIA (WA) Architecture Award: Conservation category : commendation: for Government House refurbishment (Perth)
- 1997: RAIA (Victoria) Architecture Award: Conservation category : Merit Award: in association with DBI and Peck von Hartel Trethowan for the Regent Theatre
- 1996: RAIA (Victoria) Architecture Award: Conservation category : commendation for the 1888 School of Graduate Studies building
- 1996: RAIA (Victoria) Architecture Award: Conservation category : commendation for Melbourne Town Hall main hall and foyers
- 1995: City of Melbourne Building & Planning Award: Urban Conservation Award for the Royal Exhibition Building interior dome restoration
- 1995: RAIA (Victoria) Chapter Award: Outstanding Architecture : Conservation category : commendation for the restoration of the Royal Exhibition Building and conservation of the dome
- 1994: RAIA (Victoria) Chapter Award: Award of Merit for Outstanding Architecture: Conservation category in association with Peddle Thorp & Learmonth for ANZ Bank Project: The Gothic Bank
- 1994: RAIA Lachlan Macquarie Award for Conservation in association with Peddle Thorp or ANZ Bank Project: The Gothic Bank
- 1994: RAIA (Victoria) Chapter Award: Outstanding Architecture: Conservation category : commendation for Laurel Lodge
- 1990: Australian Council of National Trusts Award: Australian Heritage Award: Cultural Conservation & Interpretation category: for 380 Collins Street The Gothic Bank
- 1990: Australian Council of National Trusts Award: Australian Heritage Award : Architecture category for the Princess Theatre
- 1990: Dulux Colour Award commendation for the exterior of the Princess Theatre
- 1990: The Illuminating Engineering Society of Australia (Victoria): Environmental Interior Lighting : high commendation for the Princess Theatre
- 1989: RAIA (ACT) Conservation Award in association with Daryl Jackson Pty Ltd for the Hyatt Hotel, Canberra
- 1984: RAIA (Victoria) William Pitt Award to Peter Lovell and Suzanne Forge in association with the Government Building Advisory Council and the Public Works Department of Victoria for the restoration of the dining room, Hotel Windsor, Melbourne
- 1984: RAIA (Victoria) Award: Merit Award for Outstanding Architecture Restorationin association with Public Works Department of Victoria (Project Architect Chris White) for Queen's Hall restoration, Parliament House, Victoria
- 1982: RAIA (Victorian) Award: Merit Award for Outstanding Building Restoration in association with the National Trust of Australia (Victoria) or the Conservation Policy and restoration of the former Denomination School, Maldon
- 1982: RAIA (Victoria) Award: Merit Award for Outstanding Building Restoration to Peter Lovell in association with John and Phylis Murphy Architects for the exterior restoration of Collingwood Town Hall
- 1982: RAIA (Victoria) Award: Merit Award for Outstanding Building Restoration to Peter Lovell and Suzanne Forge in association with the Government Building Advisory Council and the Public Works Department for the restoration and reconstruction of the Grand Dining Room, Windsor Hotel, Melbourne
