= Australian National Audit Office =

Supreme audit institution of Australia

Agency overview
- Formed: 1901
- Jurisdiction: Australia
- Headquarters: Canberra, Australian Capital Territory
- Employees: 398 (estimate for 2023–24)
- Annual budget: A$125.984 million (estimate for 2023–24)
- Agency executive: Dr Caralee McLiesh PSM, Auditor-General
- Website: www.anao.gov.au

The Australian National Audit Office (ANAO) is the supreme audit institution of Australia, serving as the national auditor for the Australian Government and Parliament. It reports directly to the parliament via the Speaker of the House of Representatives and the President of the Senate. The ANAO sits within the Prime Minister and Cabinet portfolio for purposes of administration.

The current Auditor-General for Australia is Dr Caralee McLiesh PSM, who was appointed in August 2024 and commenced in November 2024. McLiesh's appointment followed the resignation of the fifteenth Auditor-General Grant Hehir in February 2024.

== Role ==
The Australian National Audit Office is a specialist public sector agency that supports the Auditor-General of Australia, who is an independent officer of the Parliament of Australia. The main functions and powers of the Auditor-General under the Auditor-General Act 1997 (Cth) include auditing financial statements of Commonwealth agencies, authorities, companies and their subsidiaries in accordance with the Financial Management and Accountability Act 1997 (Cth) and conducting performance audits which are tabled in Parliament. The Auditor-General may report their findings directly to Parliament or to a minister, on any important matter.

In addition, the ANAO plays a leadership role in improving public administration and audit capability in Australia and overseas by publishing information such as Insights and deploying experienced staff to audit institutions in Indonesia and Papua New Guinea.

== Auditor-General ==
The Auditor-General is appointed by the Governor-General on the recommendation of the Prime Minister, for a term of ten years. In the period between Auditor-Generals, the then Deputy Auditor-General Ms Rona Mellor PSM was appointed as Acting Auditor-General in the role.

Below is a full list of Commonwealth auditors-general dating from 1902.

Name	Dates
John William Israel ISO	1902–1926
Charles Cerutty CMG	1926–1935
Herbert Charles Brown CBE	1935–1938
Ralph Abercrombie OBE	1938–1946
Albert Charles Joyce CBE	1946–1951
James Brophy ISO	1951–1955
Harold Clive Newman CBE	1955–1961
Victor John William Skermer CBE	1961–1973
Duncan Robert Steele Craik CB OBE	1973–1981
Keith Frederick Brigden AO	1981–1985
John Vincent Monaghan AO	1985–1987
John Casey Taylor AO	1988–1995
Patrick Joseph Barrett AO	1995–2005
Ian McPhee AO PSM	2005–2015
Grant Hehir	2015–2024
Caralee McLiesh PSM	2024–2034

== History ==
Audit Act 1901

Parliament of Australia
- Long title: An Act to make provision for the Collection and Payment of the Public Moneys the Audit of the Public Accounts and the Protection and Recovery of Public Property and for other purposes.
- Citation: No. 4 of 1901
- Royal assent: 7 August 1901

Repealed by
- Audit (Transitional and Miscellaneous) Amendment Act 1997
- Status: Repealed

The Audit Act 1901 was the fourth piece of legislation passed by the Parliament. The Audit Act provided a legislative basis for the financial management of Commonwealth finances and the audit of related accounts, it also provided a legal foundation for the appointment of an Auditor-General. The first Auditor-General, John William Israel, began establishing the Federal Audit Office in 1902 in Melbourne. The office moved to Canberra in 1935, in line with Government policy at that time.

The Audit Act 1901 was amended in 1979 to allow the Audit Office to undertake performance audits ("efficiency reviews"). Efficiency reviews, or performance audit, concerns the efficiency and effectiveness of a particular government activity.

The Audit Act 1901 was replaced with the Auditor-General Act 1997, which came into effect on 1 January 1998. The main features of the new act included:

- provisions that strengthened the independence of the Auditor-General and the Australian National Audit Office;
- the strengthening of the Auditor-General's role as an external auditor of Commonwealth agencies, authorities, companies and their subsidiaries, including a comprehensive mandate to conduct, with some limited exceptions, financial statement and performance audits of all government entities; and
- clarification of the Auditor-General's mandate and powers.

In 1986 the ANAO hosted XII INCOSAI, the twelfth triennial convention of the International Organization of Supreme Audit Institutions.

The Australian National Audit Office also reviews Commonwealth Government agencies pursuant to the Financial Management and Accountability Act 1997 (Cth) for the proper use and management of public money, public property and other Commonwealth resources; the Public Governance, Performance and Accountability Act 2013 (Cth) that provides reporting, accountability and other rules for Commonwealth authorities and Commonwealth companies; and the Corporations Act 2001 (Cth) for general corporate law.
