= Charles Cerutty =

Australian public servant

Charles Cerutty CMG

Commonwealth Auditor-General
- In office 4 June 1926 – 22 November 1935

Personal details
- Born: Charles John Cerutty; 25 November 1870 Sale, Victoria
- Died: 19 January 1941 (aged 70) Caulfield, Melbourne, Victoria
- Occupation: Public servant

Charles John Cerutty CMG (25 November 1870 – 19 January 1941) was a senior Australian public servant. He was Commonwealth Auditor-General between 1926 and 1935.

== Life and career ==
Cerutty was born in Sale, Victoria on 25 November 1870.

Cerutty entered the Victorian Public Service in 1888, and was transferred to the Commonwealth Public Service in 1901, the year of Federation. His first Commonwealth position was as a sub-accountant in the Department of the Treasury.

In June 1926, Cerutty was appointed the Commonwealth Auditor-General. He delivered his final audit report in October 1935. During his time as Auditor-General, he was outspoken often—particularly in regard to accounting methods, and the increasing funds spent on the old-age and invalid pension systems. Following his final report, strong representations were made by some Members of Parliament that his furlough pay should be cancelled in punishment. Cerutty declined to withdraw his report, stating that he had a job to do and had merely placed the facts before all concerned.

During his tenure as Auditor-General, Cerutty strongly opposed the move of his office from Melbourne to Canberra, arguing that its work would be less efficient and economical to carry out from the new national capital.

Cerutty died in Caulfield, Melbourne on 19 January 1941.

== Awards ==
Cerutty was made a Companion of the Order of St Michael and St George in 1927.

Government offices
Preceded by John William Israel	Commonwealth Auditor-General; 1926 – 1935	Succeeded by Herbert Charles Brown
