= Defence Housing Australia =

Australian government owned enterprise

- Industry: Real estate
- Founded: 1919 (WSHC); 1988 (DHA)
- Headquarters: Canberra, Australia
- Area served: Australia
- Number of employees: 646 (2018–19)
- Website: dha.gov.au

Defence Housing Australia (DHA) is an Australian government business enterprise established by the Defence Housing Australia Act 1987. DHA supplies housing and related services to Australian Defence Force members and their families in line with defence operational requirements. To meet these requirements, DHA is active in Australian residential housing markets, acquiring and developing land, and constructing and purchasing houses.

The DHA has its origins in the War Service Homes Commission, established in 1919 to provide housing for soldiers returned from World War I. The commission was renamed the Defence Service Homes Commission in 1973 and the Defence Service Homes Corporation in 1977, administered by the Department of Veterans' Affairs. The corporation's mortgage assets were sold to Westpac in the late 1980s and it was replaced by a new statutory body in 1988.

== History ==
=== Establishment and first years ===
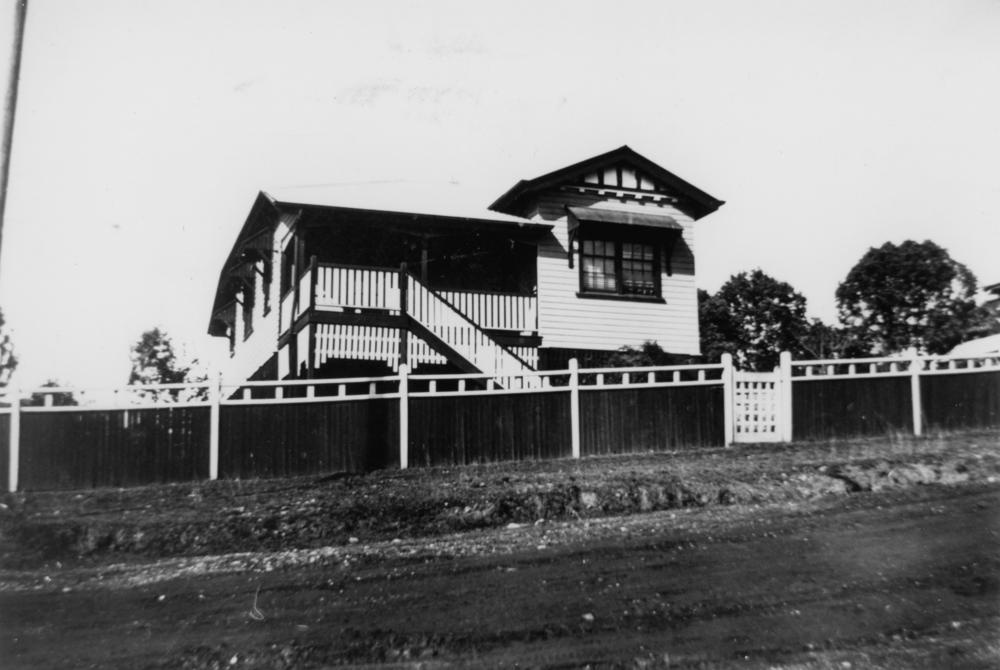
War service home built in Greenslopes, in 1928

The War Service Homes Scheme was established by the Hughes government with the passage of the War Service Homes Act 1918. The act was introduced by the repatriation minister Edward Millen to provide housing for Australian soldiers returning from World War I, supplementing existing state schemes. Millen was "acutely aware that Australia was facing a housing crisis", with new construction declining and house prices and rents having increased during the war.

The War Service Homes Commission was established in March 1919, sitting within the Repatriation Department but headed by an independent commissioner reporting directly to the repatriation minister. The War Service Homes Insurance Scheme was established at the same time, with a requirement that every home constructed under the scheme be fully ensured against fire, lightning, flood and storm damage. It was "effectively a not-for-profit co-operative arrangement from its inception, financed by premiums paid by the Homes purchasers and borrowers, with no monetary assistance whatsoever provided by the Commonwealth government".

The inaugural war service home was completed in September 1919 in Canterbury, New South Wales. The inaugural commissioner, James Walker, oversaw a rapid expansion of the housing scheme, employing primarily returned soldiers and aiming to build 8,000 homes per year. He engaged the government-owned Commonwealth Bank to act as the commission's agent in dealing with individual applicants. By June 1921 the commission had received over 39,000 applications for assistance, with 17,400 applications approved. After finding the private sector unable to provide adequate building materials or keep up with the desired rate of construction, Walker began to vertically integrate the commission's supply chain, purchasing timber plantations and sawmills in Queensland and Victoria, a tileworks in South Australia, joinery works in multiple states, and leasing a brickworks. Although he had exceeded his construction targets, he came into conflict with Millen over his administration of the scheme and was dismissed in 1921.

In 1923, responsibility for the commission was transferred from the Repatriation Department to the Department of Works & Railways, with the departmental head becoming the ex officio war service homes commissioner from 1925. The scheme was rationalised following Walker's dismissal, with capital expenditure declining significantly and a greater emphasis on co-operation with state governments. The Great Depression saw a significant increase in mortgage payments in arrears, and by 1936 the commission had foreclosed on nearly 3,000 homes despite relatively generous hardship provisions. The commission's headquarters were moved to Canberra in 1937, although by that time it was granting few new loans as most World War I veterans had successfully reintegrated.

=== World War II and aftermath ===
The act governing the War Service Homes Commission was amended in April 1941 to allow for World War II returned soldiers to take advantage of the scheme. The commission struggled to cope with the increased demand for housing, particularly after the general demobilisation of Australian troops in October 1945. As a result, in 1947 the commission introduced a points scheme giving preference based on disabilities and family circumstances, which continued until 1953 when it reverted to a first-come, first-served basis. Despite the post-war housing crisis, the commission was unable to expend its full budget in the first years after the war's end due to post-war shortages of building materials and skill shortages.

In 1947, the War Service Homes Commission was made a division within the new Department of Works & Housing, with its staff formally becoming members of the Commonwealth Public Service and its divisional head being re-titled as the director of war service homes. It was transferred to other departments several times following administrative restructures in the following decades, moving to the Department of Social Services in 1949, to the Department of National Development in 1956, and to the Department of Housing in 1964.

The early 1950s saw a major expansion of the scheme, with over 15,000 homes built per year and eligibility extended to soldiers returned from the Korean War and the Malayan Emergency. The rate of applications did not decline until the 1960s. By 1969, the War Service Homes Scheme had provided over 280,000 homes, more than 10 percent of Australia's housing stock.

=== Restructuring ===
In 1973, the Whitlam government expanded the eligibility criteria for the scheme to include members of the military who had served in peacetime. The Defence Service Homes Act 1973 rebranded the scheme as the Defence Service Homes Scheme, with responsibility transferred to the new Department of Housing and Construction and then to the Department of Urban & Regional Development in 1975. The insurance component was rebranded as the Defence Service Homes Insurance Scheme (DSHIS) and transferred to the Department of Repatriation and Compensation.

Both the housing and insurance schemes were transferred to the new Department of Veterans' Affairs by the Fraser government in 1976, with the commission rebranded as the Defence Service Homes Corporation (DSHC). The housing scheme faced difficulties in coping with the expanded eligibility criteria, leading many former military members to instead seek commercial financing for their houses. The government increased the maximum loan available from the commission in 1980, leading to a surge in applicants.

=== Modern era and privatisation ===
The newly elected Hawke government commissioned an external review of the Defence Service Homes Scheme in 1983, which found that there was "no clearly articulated overall Defence Service Housing policy, that there was a lack of clear accountability in the way that the Scheme was managed, that costs were not pulled together, and that, crucially, lack of access to afordable housing was a major reason why people left the Services".

In 1985, federal treasurer Paul Keating announced that the Defence Services Home Scheme's mortgage portfolio would be privatised. The DSHC's loan assets were sold to Westpac in 1988, at which time it held around 128,000 mortgages with a value of $1.38 billion. The insurance assets held by DSHIS were retained under government ownership. The DSHC formally ceased to exist on 30 June 1989.

The Hawke government's Defence Housing Authority Act 1987 authorised the establishment of the Defence Housing Authority on 1 January 1988 as a new statutory authority responsible for providing housing for members of the Australian Defence Force and their families. The Howard government renamed the authority as Defence Housing Australia in 2006.

== Possible privatisation ==
In February 2014, the National Commission of Audit recommended in its Phase One Report that the Commonwealth sell its interest in Defence Housing Australia.

== Sources ==
- Payton, Philip (2020). Cover Plus the Care: A Centenary History of the Defence Service Homes Insurance and Loans Schemes (PDF). Department of Veterans' Affairs. ISBN 9780648661122.
