= Albert Chowne =

Recipient of the Victoria Cross

Albert Chowne VC MM
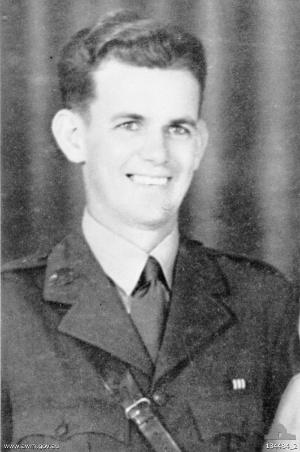
- Lieutenant Albert Chowne c.1944
- Born: 19 July 1920; Sydney, Australia
- Died: 25 March 1945 (aged 24) near Dagua Airfield, Territory of New Guinea
- Military career
- Allegiance: Australia
- Branch: Australian Army
- Service years: 1940–1945
- Rank: Lieutenant
- Unit: 2/2nd Australian Infantry Battalion
- Conflicts: Second World War; North African campaign; Western Desert Campaign; Siege of Tobruk; Second Battle of El Alamein (WIA); Pacific War; New Guinea campaign; Battle of Finschhafen; Aitape-Wewak campaign †
- Awards: Victoria Cross; Military Medal

Albert Chowne, VC, MM (19 July 1920 – 25 March 1945) was an Australian recipient of the Victoria Cross, the highest award for gallantry in the face of the enemy that can be awarded to Commonwealth forces.

== Early life ==
Chowne was born in Sydney. He attended Chatswood Boys Intermediate High School and Naremburn Junior Technical School.

In 1935, he began work as a shirt-cutter with David Jones. In his spare time Chowne played rugby union and tennis, and took part in Scouting.

== Second World War ==
Chowne spent a brief period in the 36th Battalion, a Militia unit, before enlisting in the Second Australian Imperial Force in late May 1940. He was assigned to the 2/13th Battalion as a platoon message runner, and was later made company runner. The unit, part of the 9th Division, arrived in the Middle East in November 1940 and later joined the North African campaign, defending Tobruk for eight months in 1941. During his time at Tobruk, Chowne transferred to the carrier platoon and was promoted to corporal. After Tobruk the 2/13th performed garrison duties in Syria where, in September, Chowne was promoted to sergeant. He was wounded in the leg and hand at El Alamein the following month and spent three weeks in hospital. He returned to Australia with the battalion in January 1943.

In July, the unit was deployed to New Guinea campaign, taking part in the Battle of Finschhafen. Chowne, now commanding a mortar platoon, was awarded the Military Medal for twice crawling close to enemy positions to direct mortar fire. Regarded as exceptionally cool by his comrades, Chowne combined fearlessness with a self-effacing manner.

He was commissioned as a lieutenant in January 1944 and he married Daphne Barton, a corporal in the Australian Women's Army Service, in March that year. After completing a jungle warfare training course at Canungra, Queensland, Lt. Chowne was posted to the 2/2nd Battalion, part of the 6th Division, in October 1944. Two months later the 2/2nd began the Aitape-Wewak campaign in New Guinea in November 1944.

=== Victoria Cross action ===
On 25 March 1945 near Dagua Airfield, Chowne attacked an enemy position which was holding up further movement towards Wewak. Seeing that the leading platoon was suffering heavy casualties, Chowne rushed forward and knocked out two light machine guns with grenades and then, calling on his men to follow him and firing his sub machine gun from the hip, he charged the position. Although he was twice wounded in the chest, the impetus of his charge carried him forward 50 yards under intense machine gun and rifle fire and he accounted for two more of the enemy before he was killed.

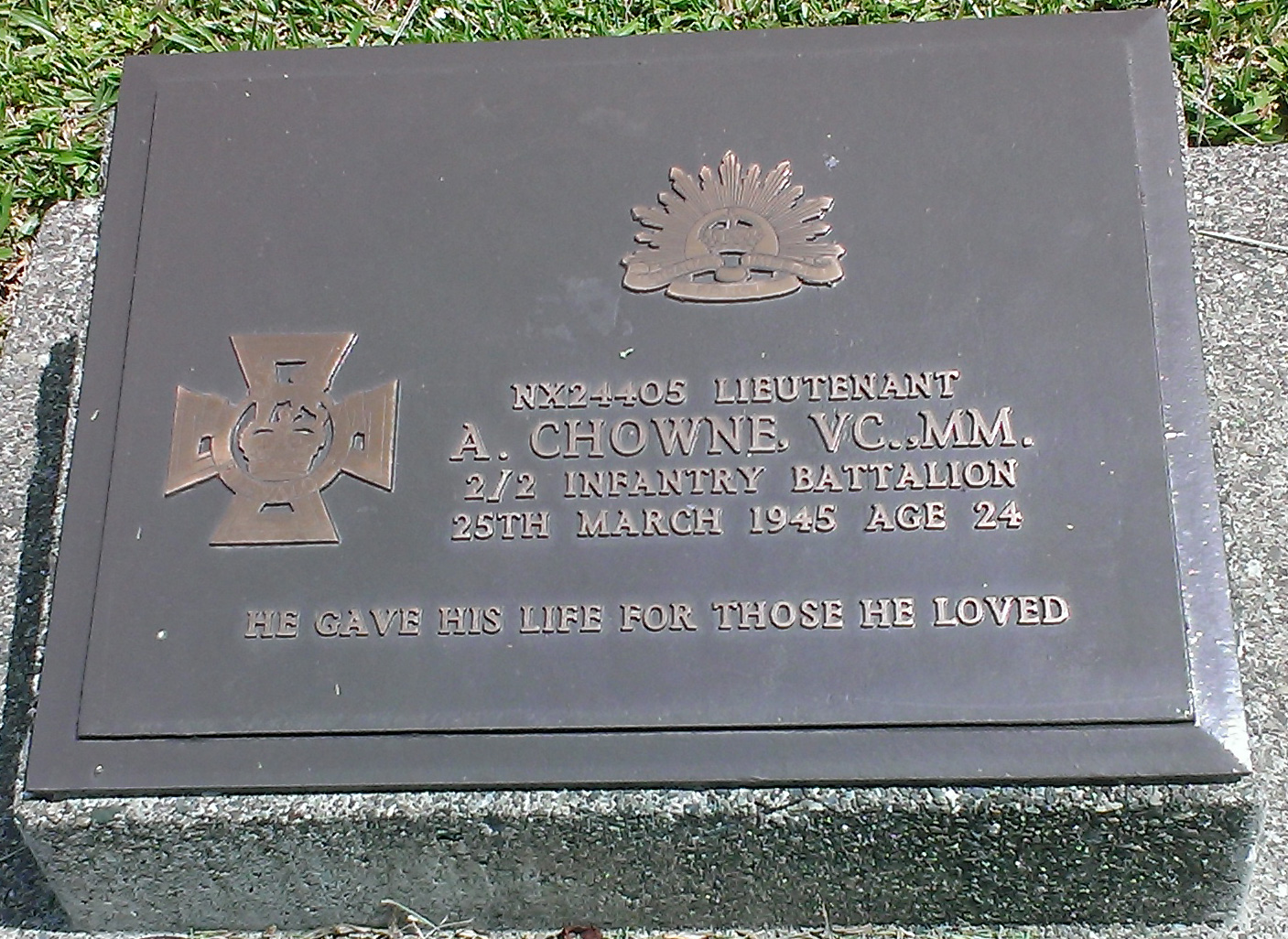
The grave of Albert Chowne VC at Lae War Cemetery, Papua New Guinea.

Chowne was awarded the Victoria Cross posthumously and was buried at the Lae War Cemetery, Lae, New Guinea. His VC is displayed at the Australian War Memorial.

== Legacy ==
Chowne's name is commemorated in several places around Australia. A street in Campbell, Canberra is named. In the City of Willoughby, Sydney, the community facility is called the Albert Chowne Memorial Hall and in Middle Cove, Chowne Place are both named after him.

On 8 May 2015, Chowne's widow, Daphne Dunne, was in the crowd at the Sydney Opera House when Prince Harry was farewelled from Australia by the public at the end of a month-long deployment with the Australian Army. The prince recognised the VC medal in the cluster worn on Dunne's right breast, and approached her to discuss the medal as well as her own medals over her left breast. The Daily Telegraph reported that Dunne had a conversation with the prince and "she told him how her first husband Lieutenant Albert Chowne died aged 25 in 1945 – just a year after they married – in a heroic attack on a Japanese machinegun post in Papua New Guinea. The red roses that Lt Chowne had arranged to be sent to his young bride on her birthday arrived just before the news he had been killed." It went on to say: "She wed her second husband, Corporal John Dunne, who was captured in Malaya in 1942 and ended up in Changi POW camp ... (regarding the prince) In a show of affection as he leaned down towards her, she touched his face before he kissed her on the cheek." The newspaper also reported that, in meeting the prince, she had now met all the senior members of the British royal family. Dunne died on 1 April 2019, shortly after receiving a birthday card from Prince Harry and his wife, Meghan Markle, to celebrate her 99th birthday.
