= Department of Repatriation (1975–76) =

Australian government department, 1975–1976

Department overview
- Formed: 22 December 1975
- Preceding Department: Department of Repatriation and Compensation
- Dissolved: 5 October 1976
- Superseding Department: Department of Veterans' Affairs
- Jurisdiction: Commonwealth of Australia
- Ministers responsible: Kevin Newman, Minister (1975–1976); Peter Durack, Minister (1976)
- Department executive: Richard Kingsland, Secretary

The Department of Repatriation was an Australian government department that existed between December 1975 and October 1976.

== Scope ==
Information about the department's functions and government funding allocation could be found in the Administrative Arrangements Orders, the annual Portfolio Budget Statements and in the department's annual report.

The functions of the department at its creation were defined as repatriation and other benefits for members of the Defence Forces and their dependants.

== Structure ==
The department was a Commonwealth Public Service department, staffed by officials who were responsible to the Minister for Repatriation and Compensation. The Department's Secretary was Richard Kingsland.
