= Lae War Cemetery =

WWII-era cemetery in Papua New Guinea

- Commonwealth War Graves Commission
- Used for those deceased 1939–1945
- Established: 1944 (concentration cemetery)
- Location: 6.72313°S 146.99690°E near Lae, Morobe Province, Papua New Guinea.
- Total burials: 2,818
- Unknowns: 444

Burials by nation
- Australia & Commonwealth

Burials by war
- World War II

The Lae War Cemetery, established in 1944, is located adjacent to the Botanical Gardens in the centre of the city of Lae, the capital of Morobe Province, in Papua New Guinea. The cemetery is managed by the Commonwealth War Graves Commission.

In World War II, Japanese and Commonwealth soldiers fought to hold the strategic areas of Papua New Guinea, and the Morobe Province was the site of several heated campaigns in late 1942–1943; by 1944, the Japanese had been driven off the island. The cemetery holds the remains of over 2,800 soldiers, many of whom died in the Salamaua–Lae campaign, but also those who died in Japanese detention on the Island. As the remains of missing soldiers are recovered, they are interred in the cemetery.

== History ==
In the early months of 1942, Japan dominated the skies. Lae and Salamaua were bombed on 21 January 1942 by 100 planes, and 3,000 land troops arrived on 7 March. There were also landings at Salamaua, followed on 21 July by further landings at Buna and Gona on the east coast, as the Japanese prepared to push through the Owen Stanley Mountains across the Papuan Peninsula to Port Moresby. Lae became one of the bases from which the Japanese launched their southward drive, until it was stopped at Ioribaiwa Ridge, a point within 60 kilometres (37 mi) from Port Moresby.

== Cemetery ==
The cemetery was dedicated in 1944 by Lieutenant-General Sir Leslie Morshead, assisted by Chaplain C. M. Swan and Chaplain J. W. Drakeford. The Commonwealth Graves Commission assumed responsibility for it in 1947. The Lae Memorial commemorates 300 men of the Australian forces (including Merchant Navy, Royal Australian Air Force, and the Australian Army) who lost their lives and have no known grave. It contains a total of 2,800 burials, of which 444 are unidentified.

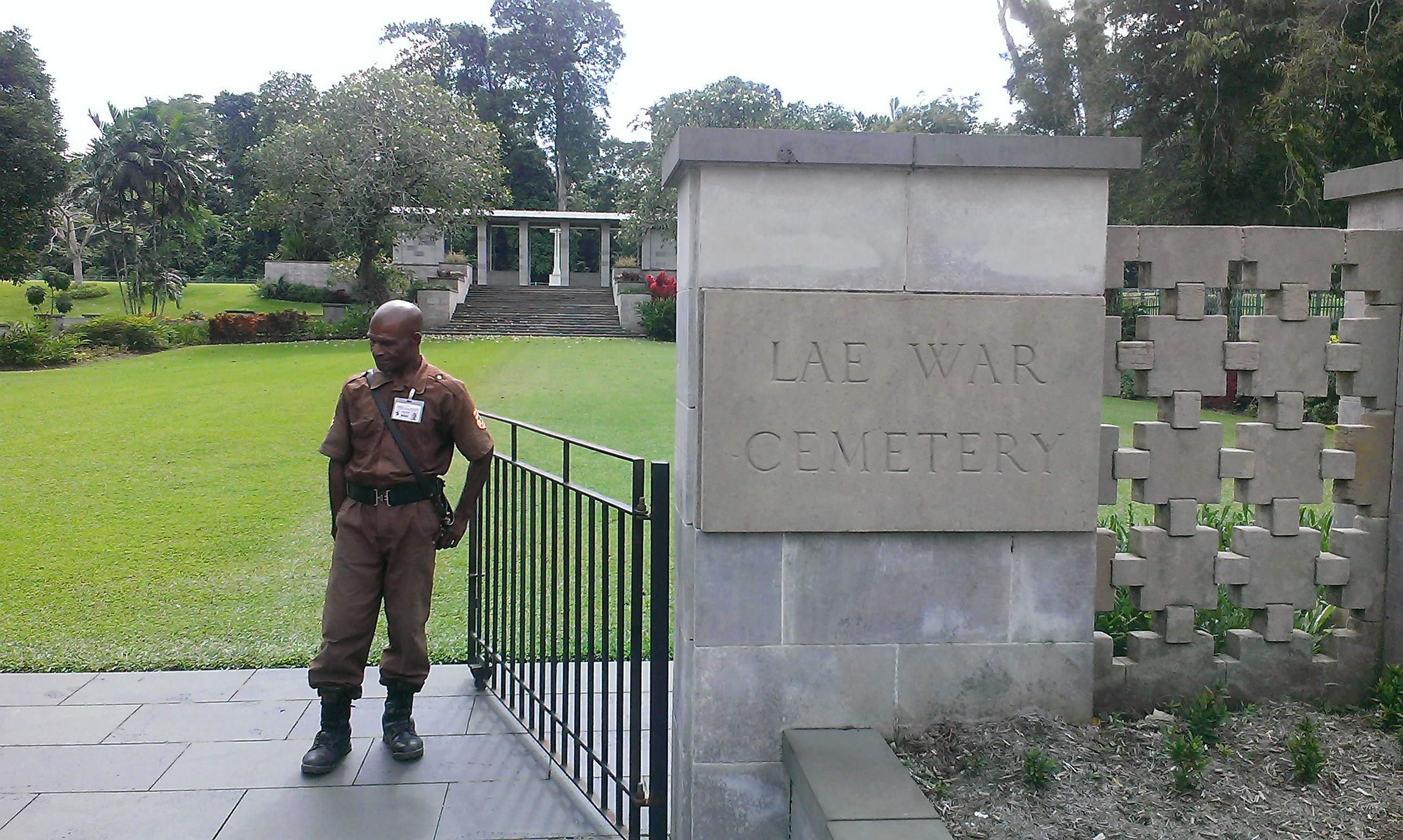
The front gate of the Lae War Cemetery.

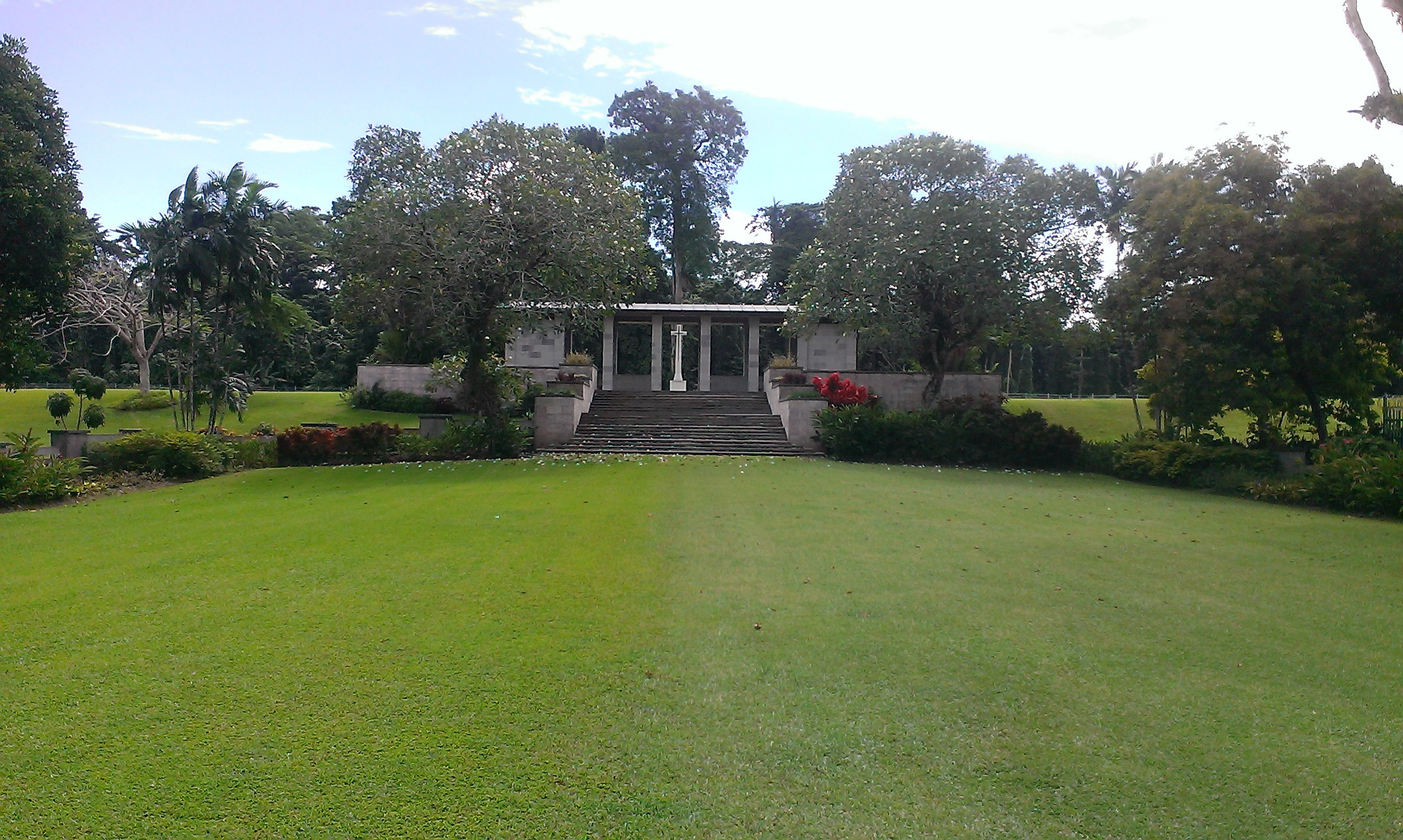
The view towards the memorial once through the front gate.

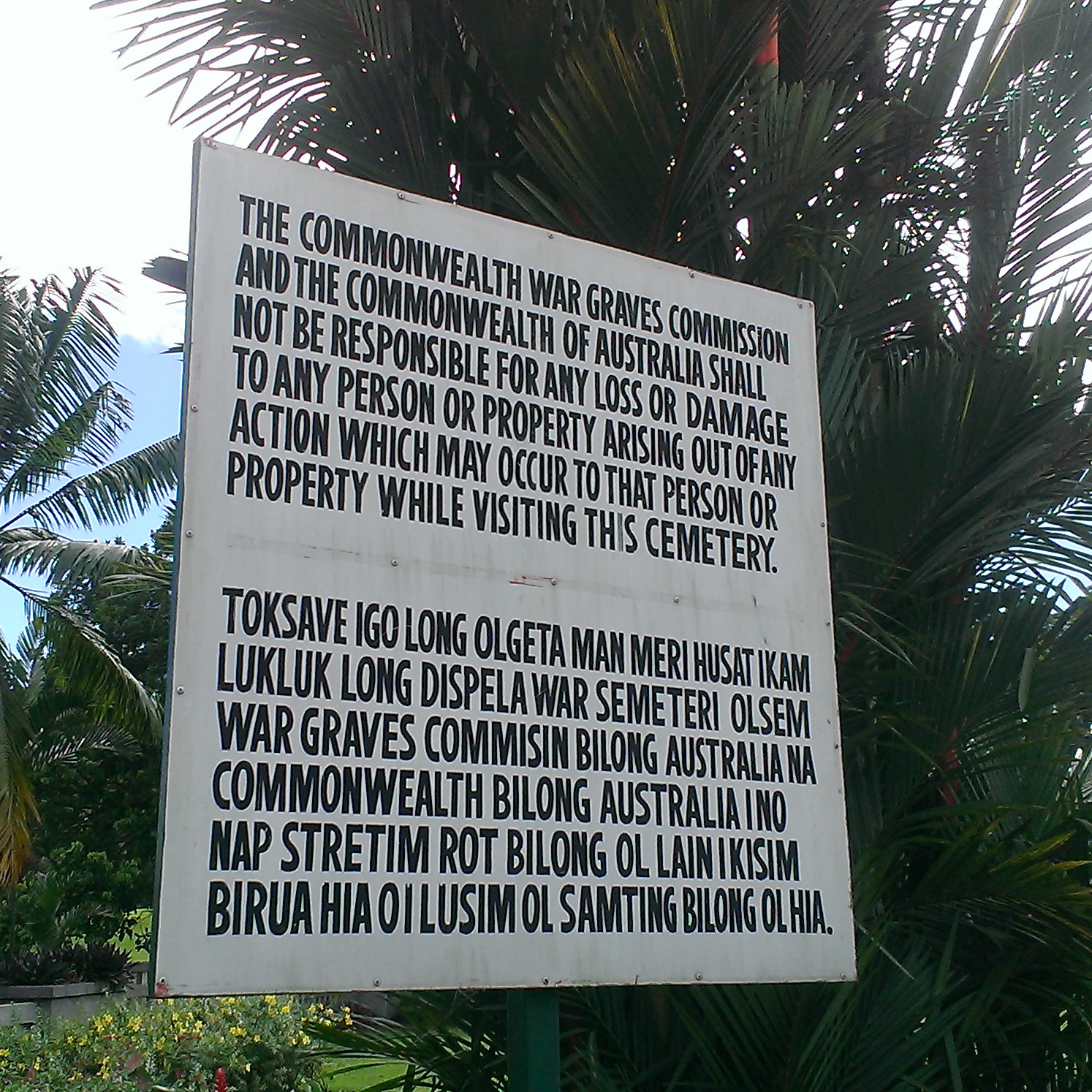
Sign at the entrance.

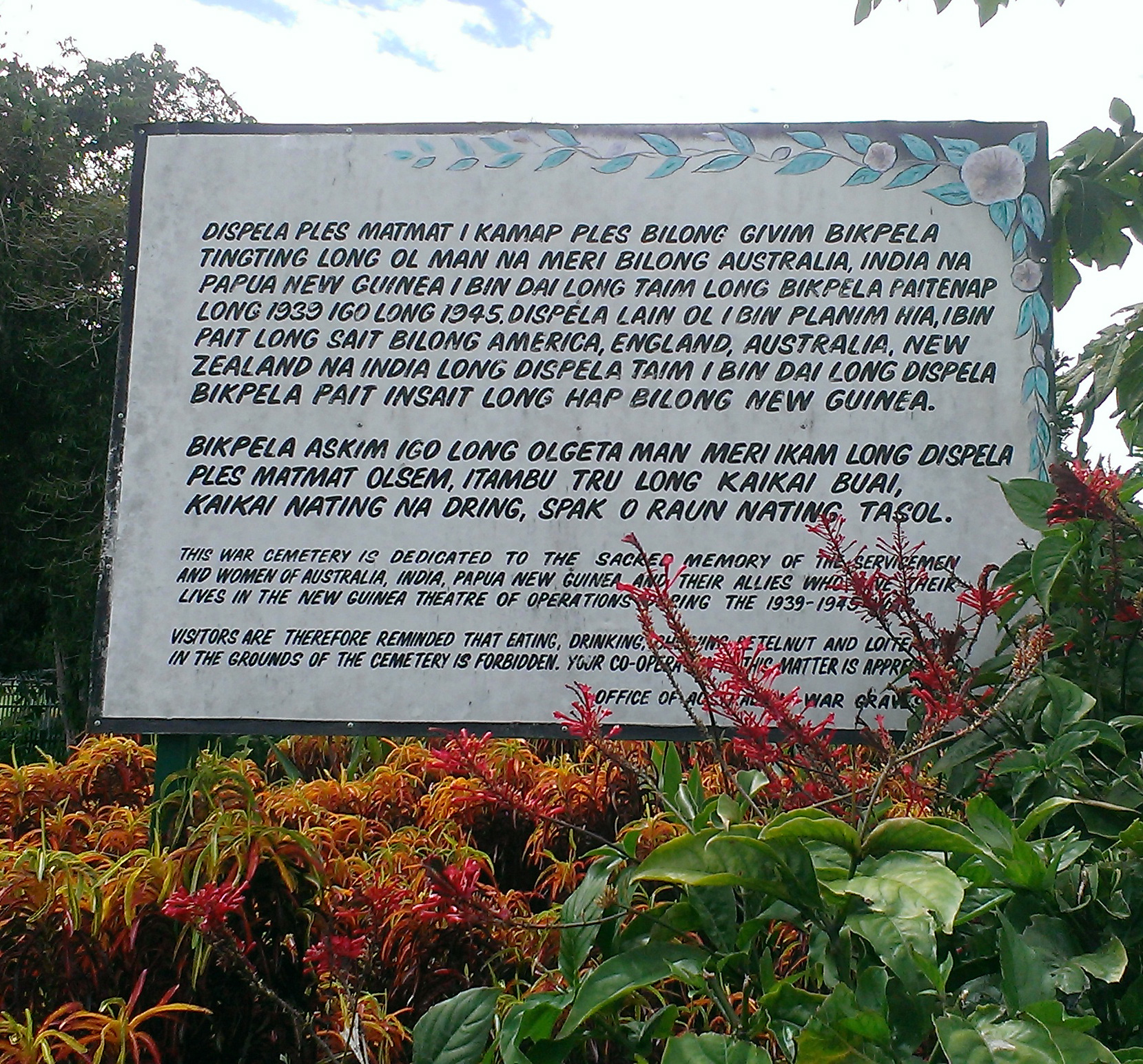
Sign at the entrance.

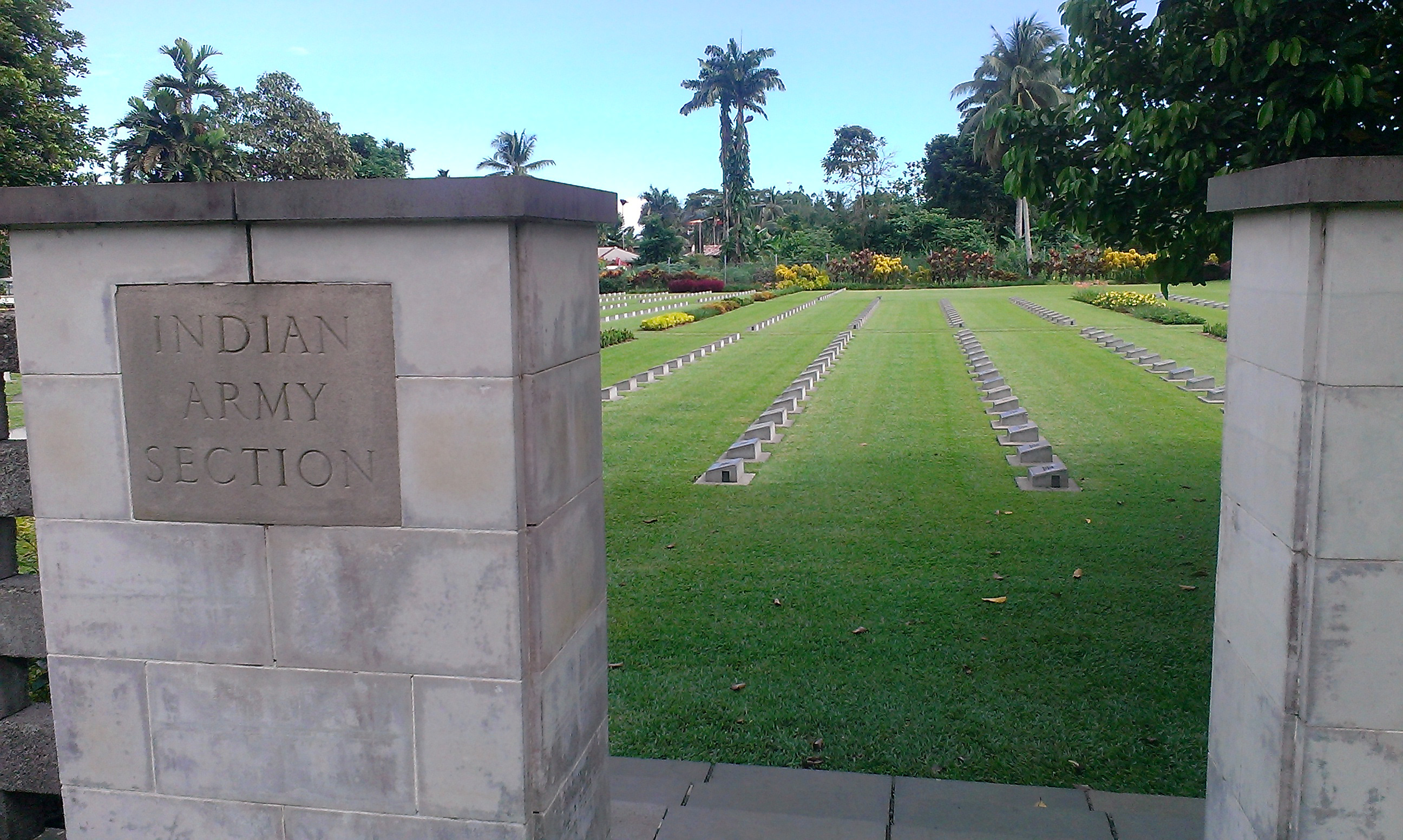
The gate to the Indian section. Left side of the main gate.

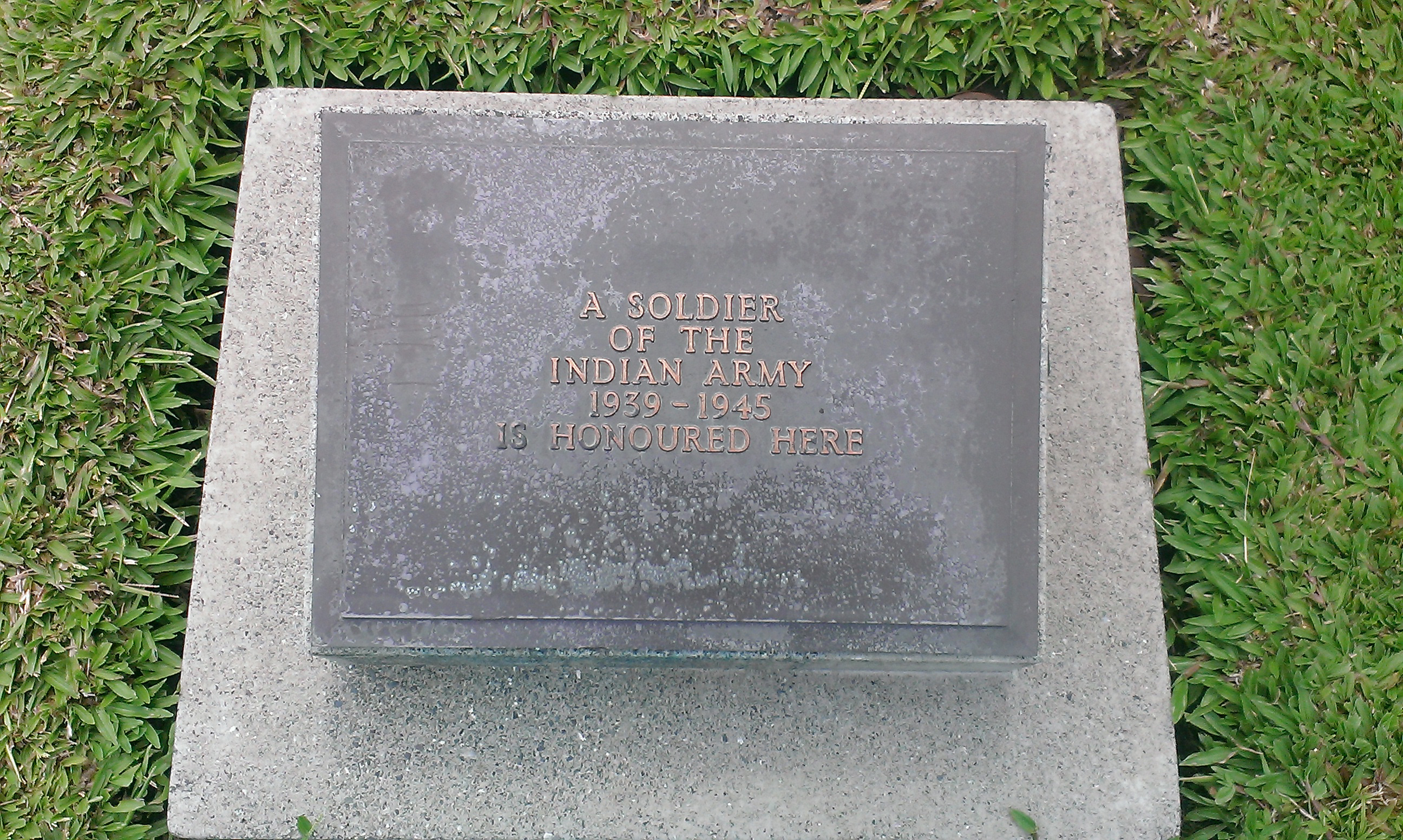
Close up of one of the graves.

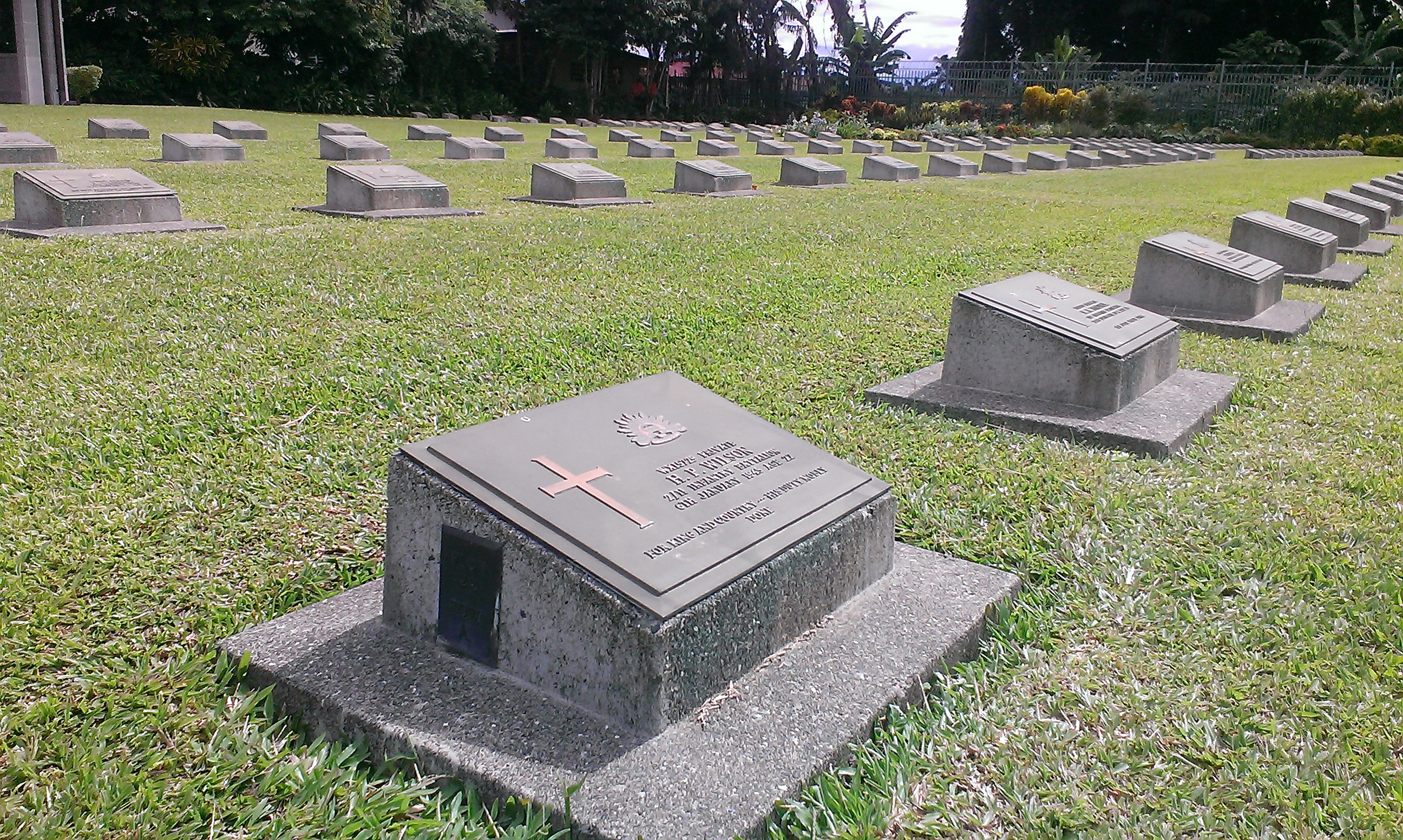
Australian section. Row AWX15729 Private H.P Wilson 2/11 Infantry Battalion 6 January 1943 – Age 22 - For King and country – his duty nobly done.

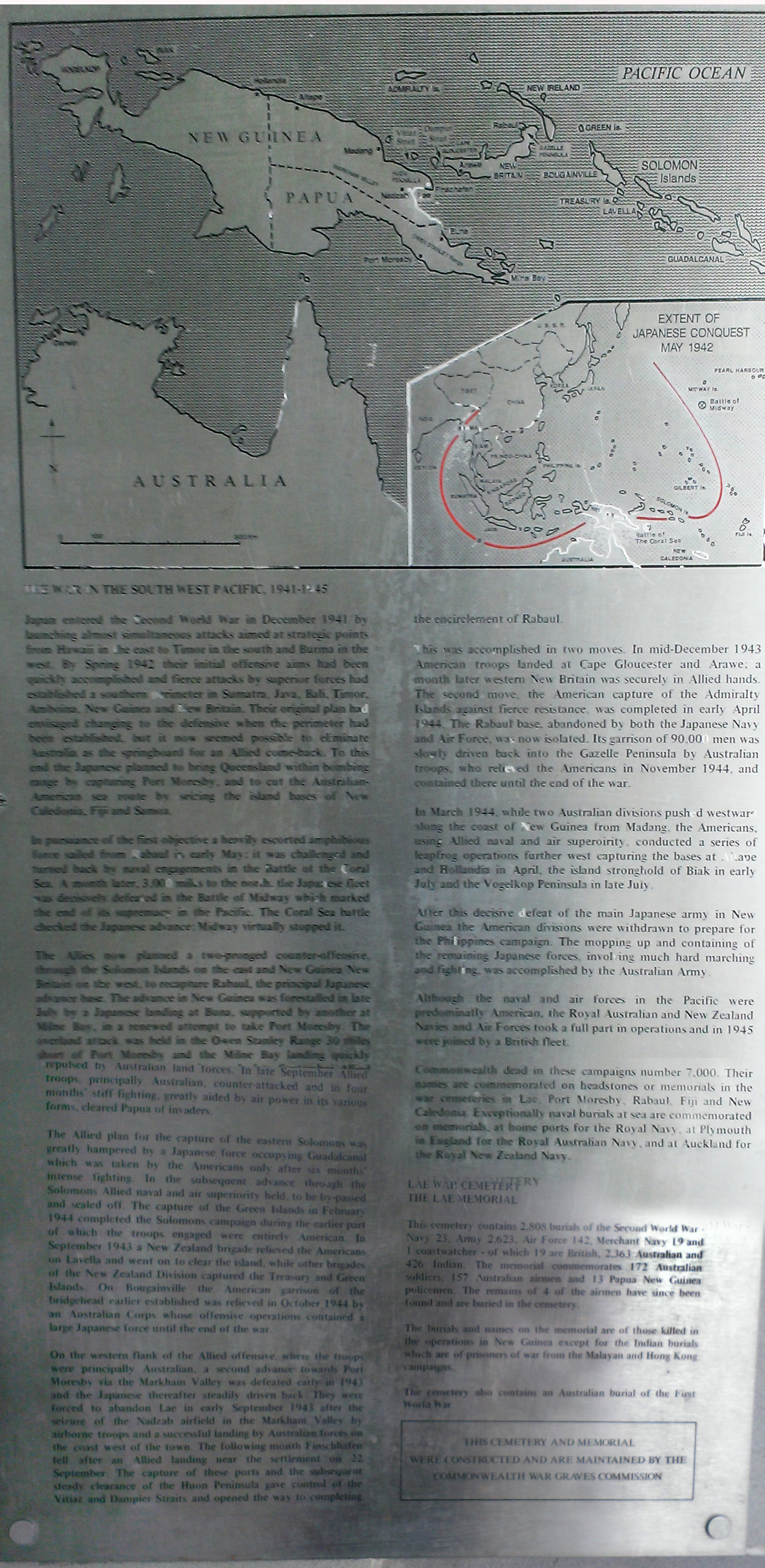
Panel inside the Lae Memorial.

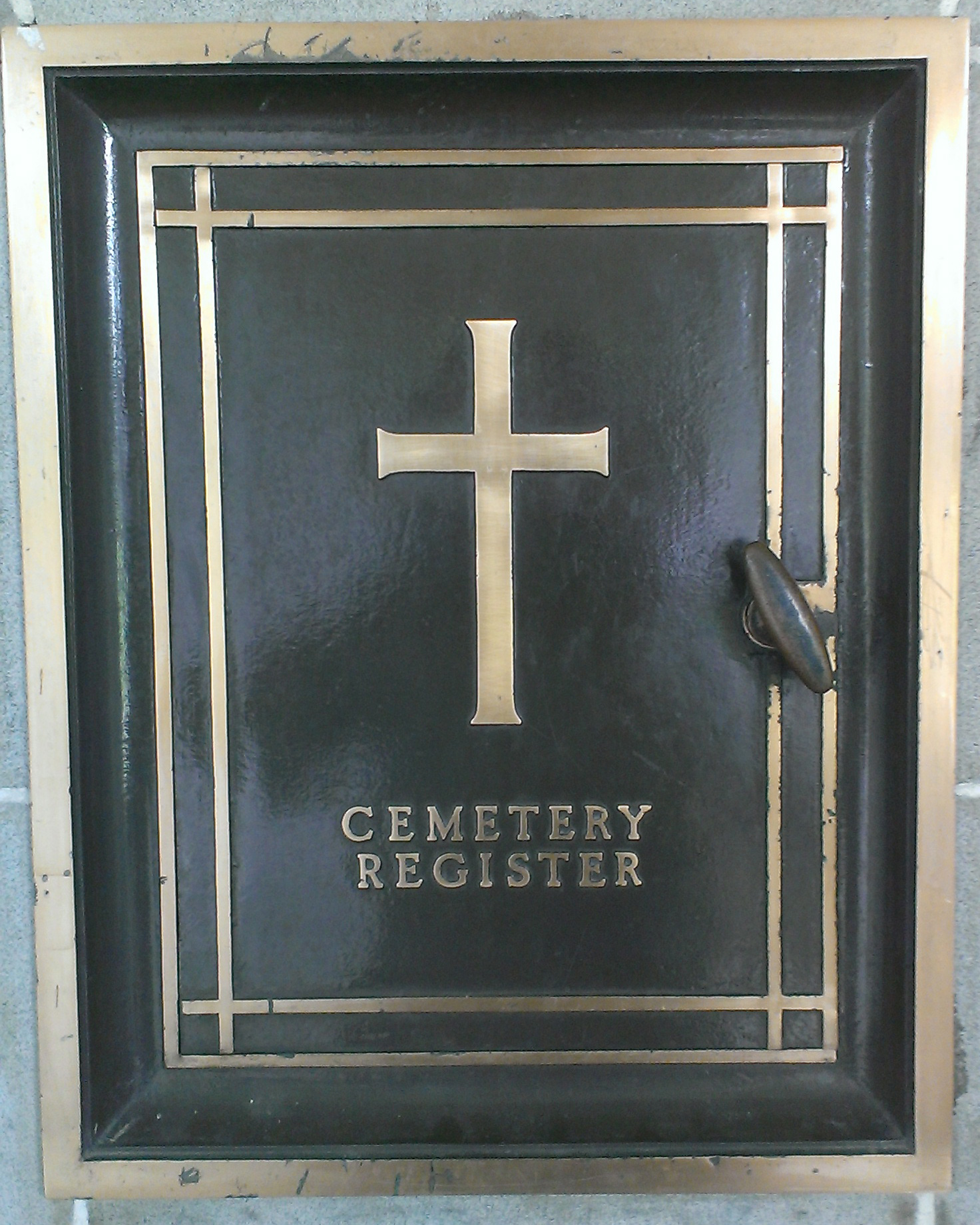
Cemetery Register compartment in the Lae Memorial.

=== Design ===
Rising from the Cemetery forecourt, a wide flight of steps leads to a flat-topped colonnade. The central span of the colonnade frames a view of the Cross of Sacrifice, found in every Commonwealth War Graves Commission cemetery of more than 40 burials. The cross stands on an expansive lawn in which bronze plaques mark the grave sites.

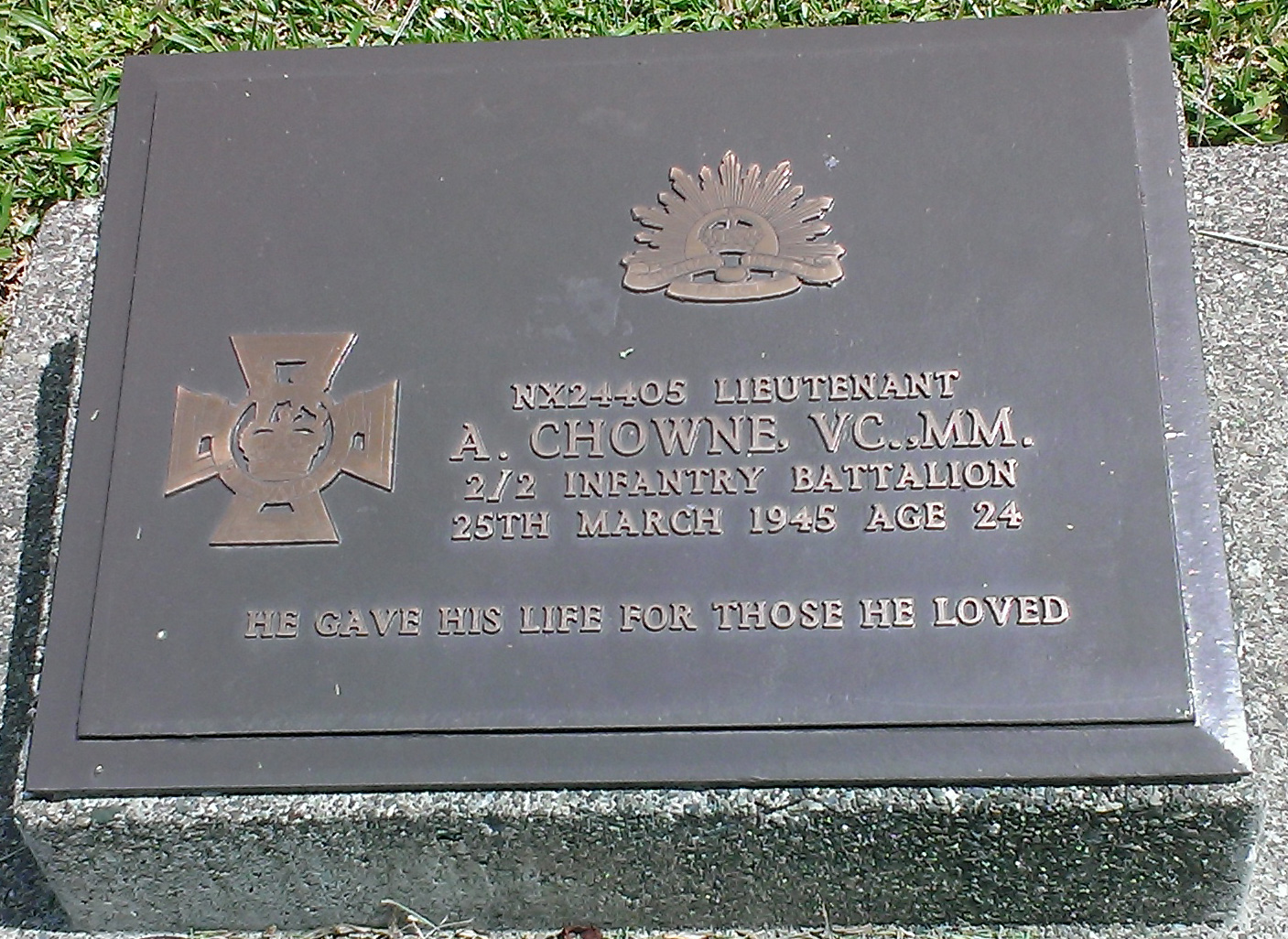
Photo of A Chowne headstone. VC recipient at Lae War Cemetery

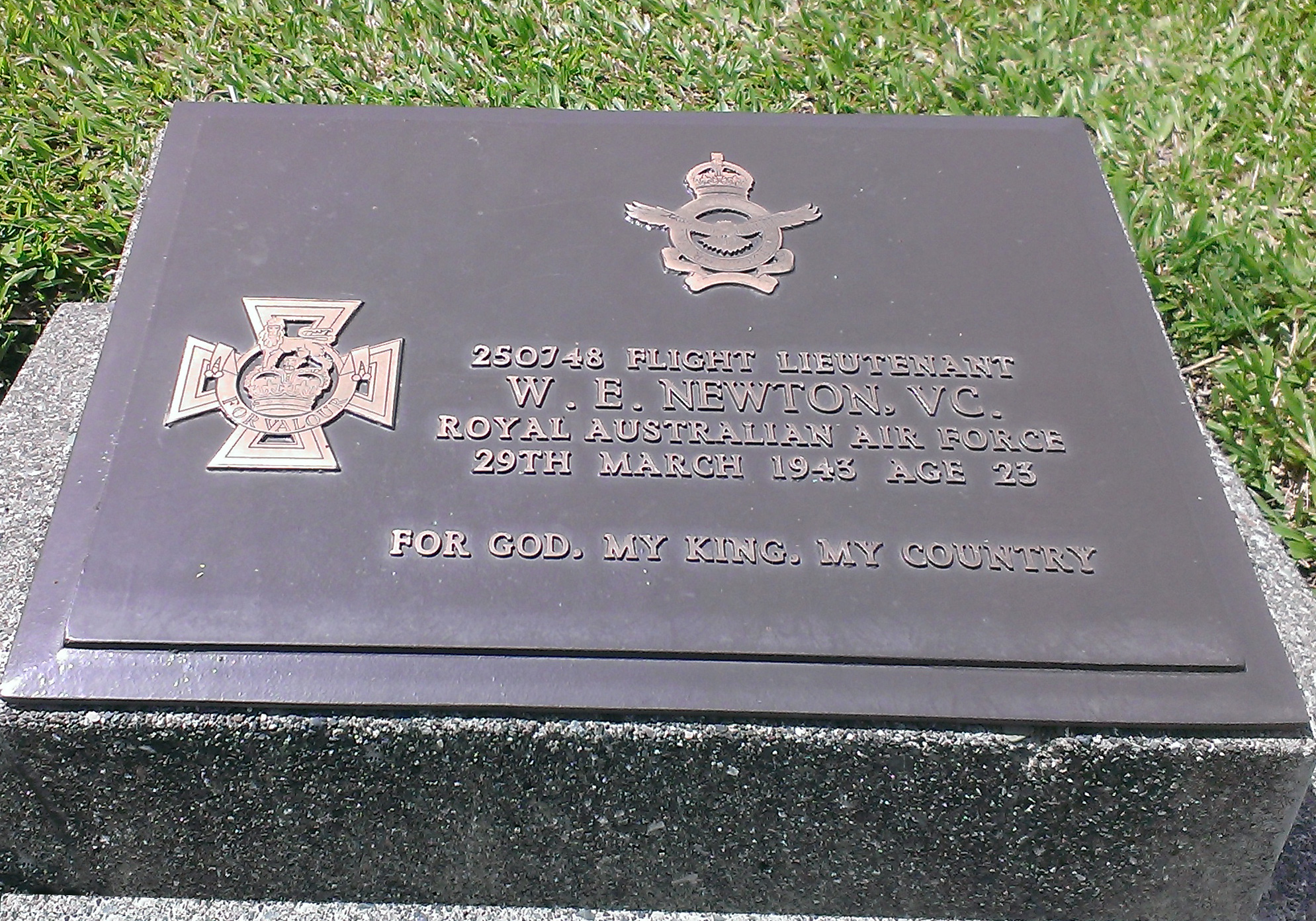
Photo of W.E. Newton headstone. VC recipient at Lae War Cemetery

=== Burials ===
The cemetery contains two classifications of burials, the identified and the unidentified. Most of the 2,818 burials are identified. Graves also include 426 Indian soldiers who were taken prisoner by the Japanese in the Malaya and Hong Kong and interred in Papua New Guinea. (See the 7th Rajput Regiment and the 14th Punjab Regiment). Most of the dead were killed in the Salamaua-Lae campaign in 1943, in particular, action at the Ramu Valley, Shaggy Ridge, and the Finisterre region. (See Australian 3rd Division.)

The cemetery also contains the grave of William Ellis Newton VC. Newton was awarded the Victoria Cross on 19 October 1943 for his actions on 16–18 March, becoming the only Australian airman to earn the decoration in the South West Pacific theatre of World War II, and the only one while flying with an RAAF squadron.

Lieutenant Albert Chowne (1920–1945 †) is buried there too. Chowne had served enlisted in the 2nd/13th Australian Infantry Battalion in Tobruk, Libya in 1941. Upon receiving his commission, he was with the 2nd/2nd Australian Infantry Battalion in New. Guinea when he was killed attacking an enemy foxhole. He received the Victoria Cross for his actions.

== Commemorations ==
The annual dawn service is held every ANZAC (Australia New Zealand Army Corps) day to commemorate the dead. The day is celebrated on 25 April, the landing of the Australian and New Zealand forces at Galipoli during World War I. The typical service is patterned on the military dawn "stand-to," followed by an introduction, hymns, prayer, an address, the laying of wreaths, a recitation or two, followed by the playing of the Last Post. The service concludes with a minute of silence, Reveille, and the New Zealand and Australian national anthems.

== Recent burials ==
On 13 January 1999, two men who had died on a 1944 jungle reconnaissance flight were buried at the Lae War Cemetery. A Wirraway aircraft flown by RAAF Flight Lieutenant Denis John Unkles crashed into the Papua New Guinea jungle on 15 April 1944, killing Unkles and his passenger, Army Lieutenant John Rawdon Fethersonhaugh. The flight had departed from the Gusap Strip on 15 April 1944, for an operational reconnaissance of the Wantoat area. When the aircraft's wreckage was located in the Finisterre Range, 80 kilometres (50 mi) north-west of Lae, it was covered in 2 metres (6 ft 7 in) of jungle growth. Unkles' granddaughter played the last post.

In April 1999, RAAF Flying Officer Maurice Ambrose Bellert of the No. 82 Squadron RAAF, originally from Bundaberg, Queensland, was buried in Lae War Cemetery with full military honours. His P-40 Kittyhawk crashed into the sea off Irian Jaya on 18 October 1944, after a raid on Japanese positions. His fate and location remained a mystery until 1999, when an Indonesian fisherman discovered the wreckage in 27 metres (89 ft) of water several kilometres off Manokwari. His name was removed from the memorial for the missing, and he received a headstone of his own.

== Nearby war cemeteries ==
The Bomana War Cemetery was established across the island, 19 kilometres (12 mi) north of Port Moresby on the road to the town of Nine Mile, and is approached from the main road by a side road called Pilgrims Way. This cemetery contains 3,819 Commonwealth burials, 702 of them unidentified. It was started in 1942 by the Australian Army and is the only Papua New Guinea cemetery to contain white marble headstones and a Stone of Remembrance.

=== War memorial ===
The Lae Memorial to the Missing stands in the cemetery, to commemorate 328 officers and men of the Australian Army, the Australian Merchant Navy and the Royal Australian Air Force who died in Papua New Guinea and have no known grave. The naval casualties were killed, or died of injuries received, on HMS King George V, HMS Glenearn and Empire Arquebus, and the four men of the Merchant Navy were killed when the SS Gorgon was bombed and damaged in Milne Bay in April 1943.

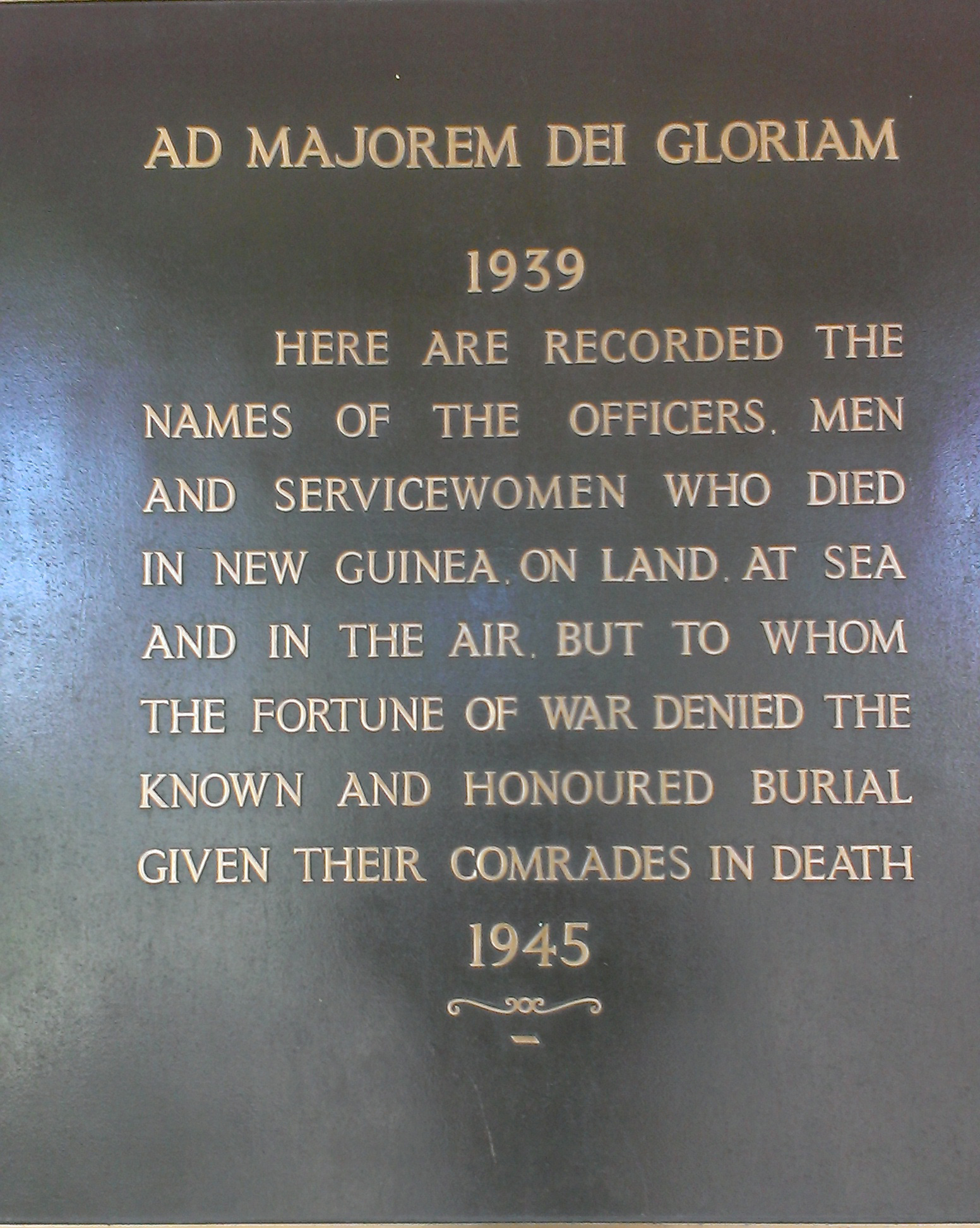
Photo of plaque between panels at the Lae Memorial at the Lae War Cemetery

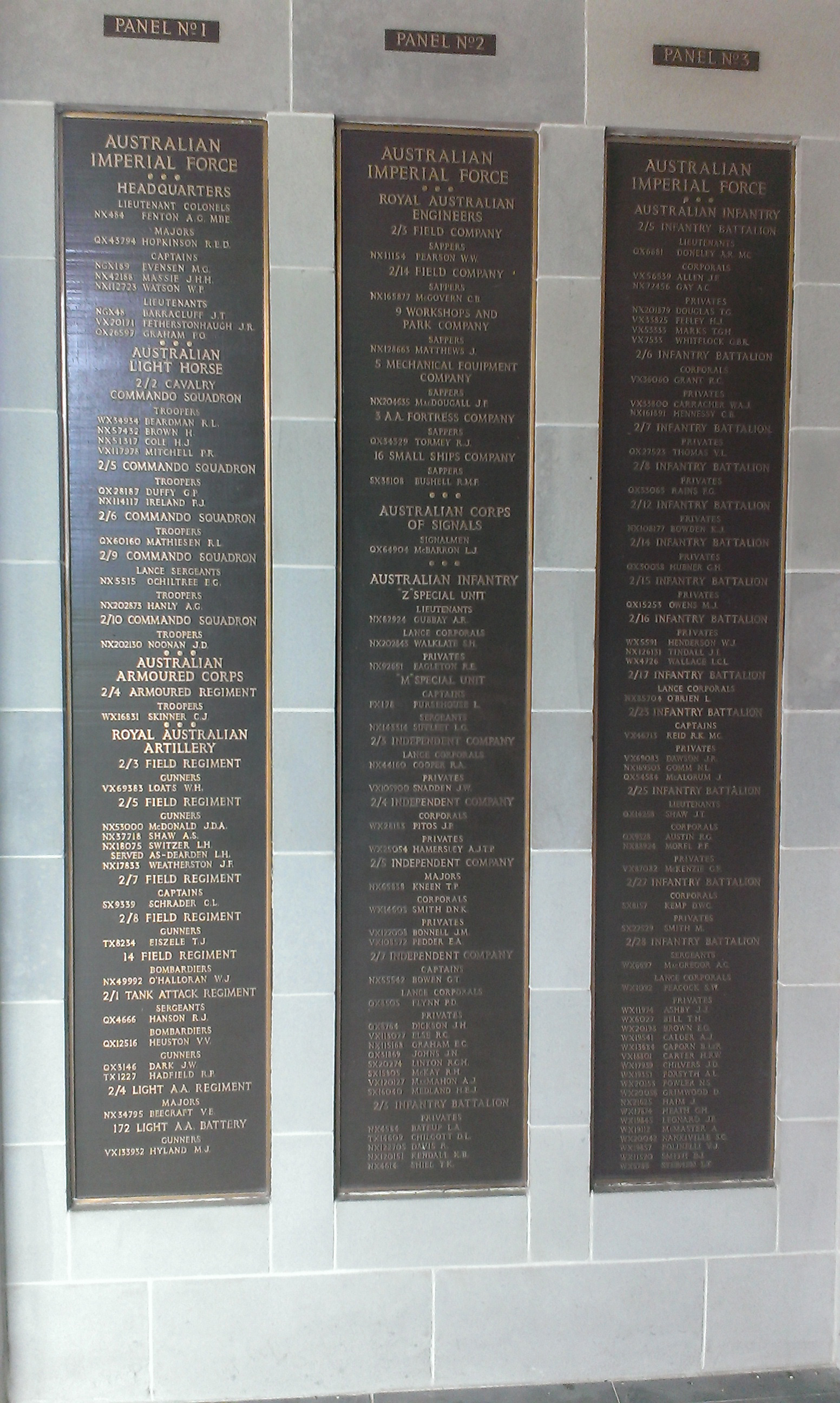
Photos of Panels 1,2,3 on the Lae Memorial

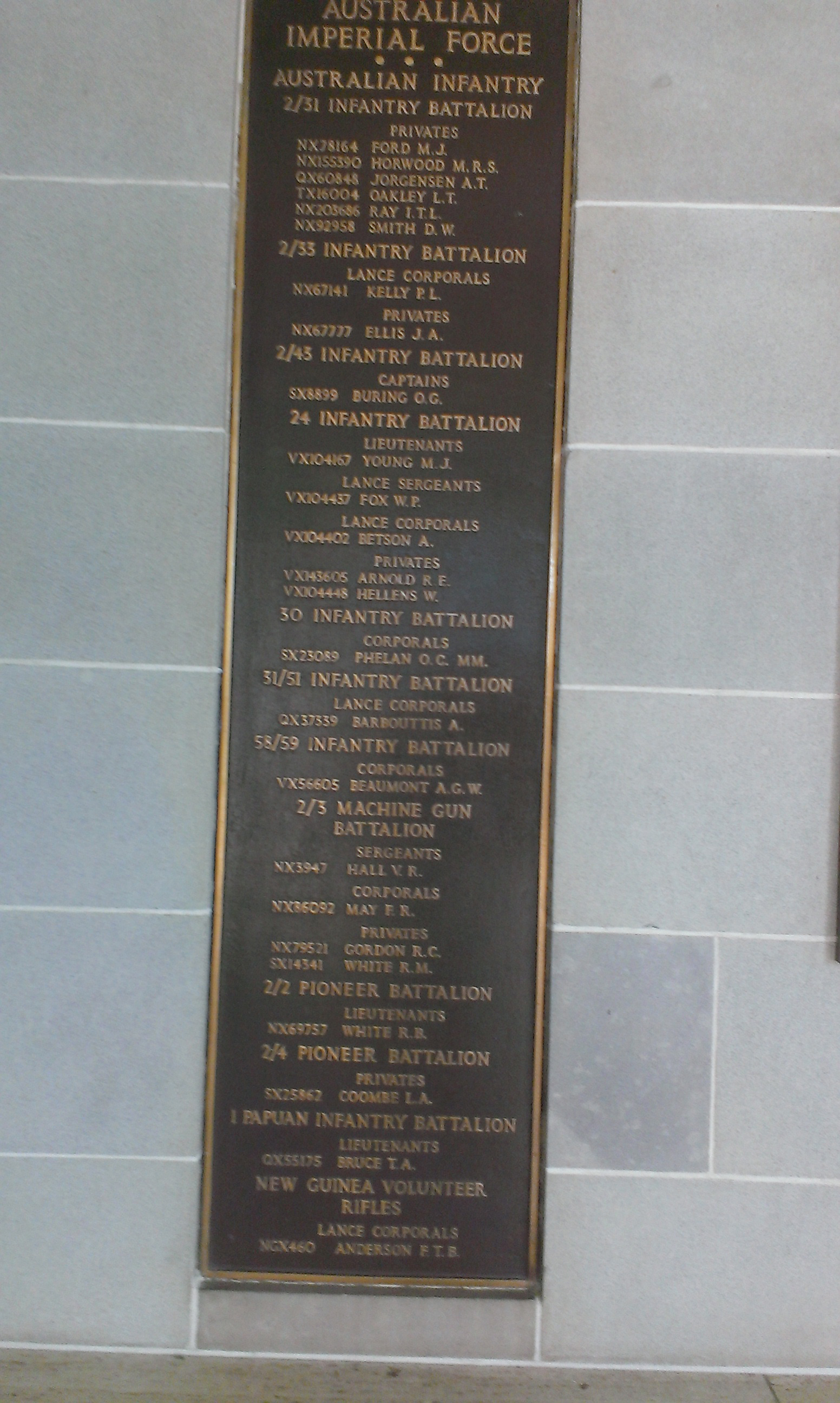
Photo of Panel 4 on the Lae Memorial

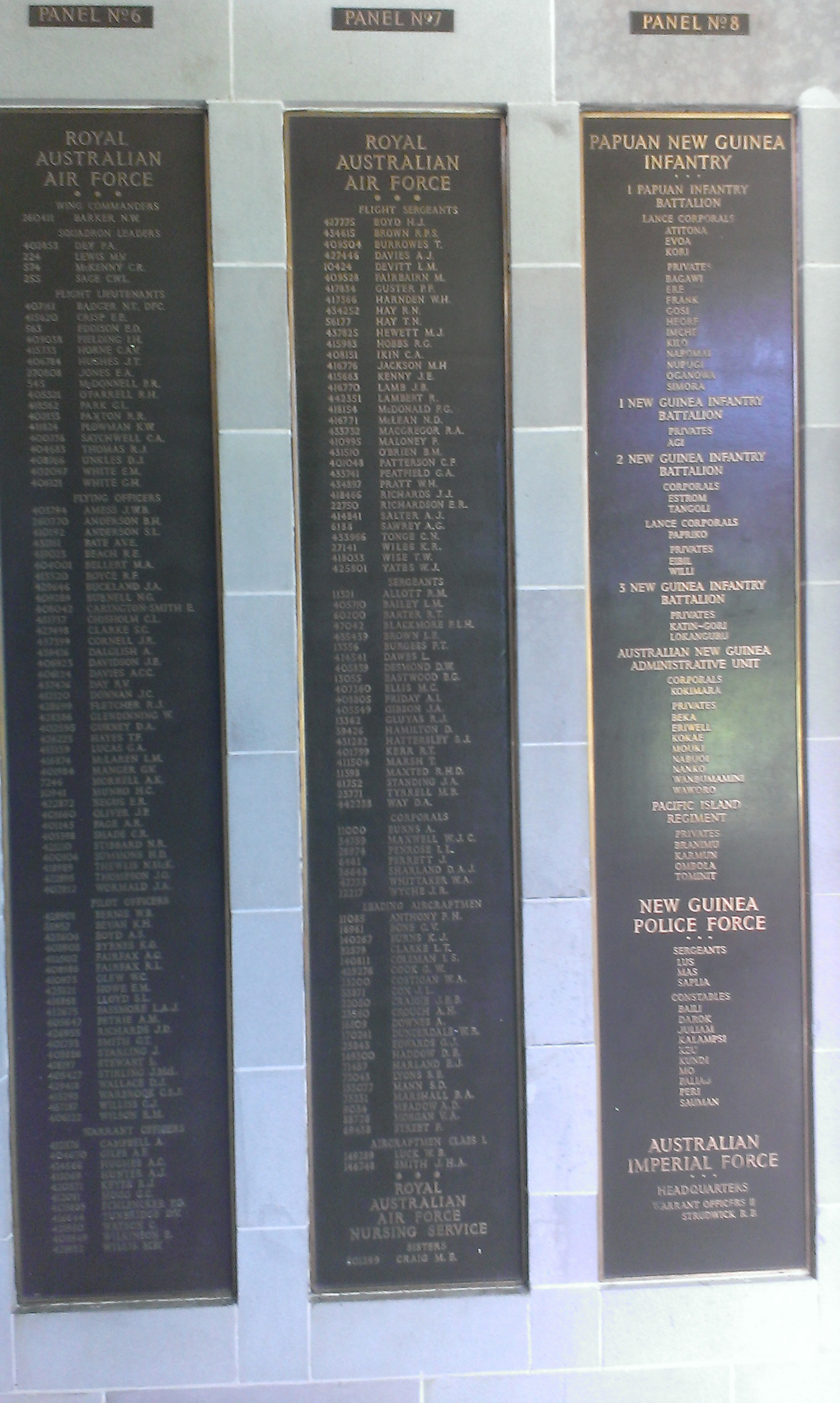
Photos of Panels 6,7,8 on the Lae Memorial

== See also ==
- List of Australian military memorials
