= Frederick Oliver Chilton =

Australian Army officer and public servant

Brigadier Sir Frederick Oliver Chilton CBE, DSO & Bar
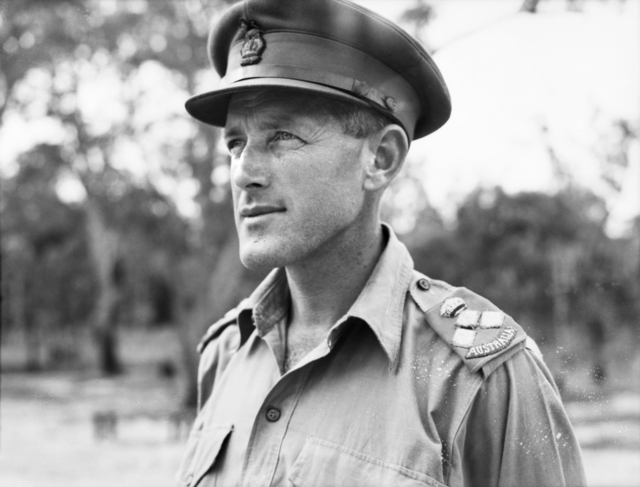
- Brigadier Chilton, Trinity Beach, Queensland, 23 July 1944

Secretary of the Repatriation Department
- In office 1958–1970
- Preceded by: Sir George Wootten
- Succeeded by: Richard Kingsland

Personal details
- Born: 23 July 1905 Woollahra, New South Wales
- Died: 1 October 2007 (aged 102) Sydney, New South Wales
- Education: University of Sydney
- Civilian awards: Knight Bachelor; Commander of the Order of the British Empire

Military service
- Allegiance: Australia
- Branch/service: Citizen Military Forces; Second Australian Imperial Force
- Years of service: 1923–1937; 1939–1946
- Rank: Brigadier
- Commands: 18th Brigade (1943–45); 2/2nd Battalion (1940–41)
- Battles/wars: Second World War; Western Desert campaign; Operation Compass; Battle of Bardia; Battle of Greece; New Guinea campaign; Battle of Milne Bay; Finisterre Range campaign; Borneo campaign
- Military awards: Distinguished Service Order & Bar; Mentioned in Despatches (3)

Brigadier Sir Frederick Oliver Chilton, CBE, DSO & Bar (23 July 1905 – 1 October 2007) was a senior officer in the Australian Army and a public servant.

== Early life ==
Born in Sydney on 23 July 1905 and educated at North Sydney High School, Chilton studied law at University of Sydney, joining the Sydney University Regiment, which produced a number of notable army leaders. He was the officer commanding D Company with the 2/2nd Infantry Battalion of the 6th Division in the first Libyan and Greek campaigns.

== Military career ==
In the Libyan campaign, Chilton was described as an exceptionally careful planner who liked to leave nothing to chance. In May 1941 Chilton was awarded the Distinguished Service Order (DSO), which cited his "conspicuous gallantry, coolness and initiative". During the Greek campaign, New Zealand General Bernard Freyberg praised Chilton as a fine man for his calm attitude during the campaign.

From 1943 to 1945, Chilton, with the rank of brigadier, commanded the 18th Australian Infantry Brigade in Buna, the Ramu Valley and later in Borneo. In the New Guinea campaign, Chilton was described as modest and self-effacing but with a keen sense of duty; Chilton had already proved himself a resolute leader and careful planner. Chilton was awarded a Bar to his DSO in March 1945. At the end of hostilities he was military governor of the Celebes (now Sulawesi) and accepted the Japanese surrender from General Fusataro Teshima.

== Public servant ==
At war's end, Chilton joined the Joint Intelligence Service and helped map out Australia's Cold War strategy that led to the formation of ASIO and ASIS. He is credited with helping crack a Russian spy ring attempting to operate in Australia.

In 1948, Chilton was appointed Assistant Secretary of the Department of Defence and two years later was promoted to the position of chairman of the Repatriation Commission, the forerunner of the Department of Veterans' Affairs. Chilton said that the time when he led the Repatriation Commission was "perhaps the most useful, productive and satisfying years of my working life, and they gave full scope to whatever leadership qualities I may have possessed". He was appointed an Officer of the Order of the British Empire in 1957, and was promoted to Commander of the Order of the British Empire in 1963. In 1969, the year before he retired, he was knighted.

== Personal life and death ==
Chilton, who never married and rarely spoke of his military life, died on 1 October 2007 at age 102. He was remembered as the last surviving commanding officer of the 2/2nd Infantry Battalion. He was farewelled in Sydney by a handful of surviving soldiers from the 2/2nd Battalion, who reflected on their experiences serving under a man they described as "inspirational and genuine". Former sergeant Carl Parrott said: "He was an excellent man. He wasn't highfalutin; he was just a good bloke. There are some commanding officers I wouldn't walk five miles for, but I'd go miles and miles for him."

In 2012, a street in the Canberra suburb of Casey was named Chilton Street in Chilton's honour.

Government offices
Preceded by George Wootten	Secretary of the Repatriation Department; 1958–1970	Succeeded by Richard Kingsland
