= Jacob Kovco =

Australian Army soldier (1980–2006)

- Private Kovco in uniform
- Born: 25 September 1980; Melbourne, Australia
- Died: 21 April 2006 (aged 25); Baghdad, Iraq
- Military career
- Allegiance: Australia
- Branch: Australian Army
- Service years: 2002–2006
- Rank: Private
- Unit: 3rd Battalion, Royal Australian Regiment
- Conflicts: Iraq War

Jacob Bruce "Jake" Kovco (25 September 1980 – 21 April 2006) was a private in the Australian Army who was killed while deployed to Iraq, fatally wounded by a single shot to the head from his own Browning 9mm sidearm. He was the first Australian soldier to die while deployed to the Middle East Area of Operations. A military inquiry found Private Kovco accidentally shot himself while mishandling his pistol. This conclusion was disputed by his family and on 2 April 2008, a second inquest returned a similar verdict, finding that his death was "irresponsibly self-inflicted", and that when he pulled his gun's trigger he "disregarded the possible consequences of danger".

== Early life ==
Kovco grew up in Briagolong in Victoria's Gippsland region, east of Melbourne, and completed the Victorian Certificate of Education at Maffra Secondary College in 1998. Before enlisting in the army, he worked in a knackery processing dead livestock. He was a keen mountain bike rider and also raced motorcycles. He was married to Shelley and they had two children, Tyrie and Alana.

== Military career ==
Kovco enlisted in the Australian Army in March 2002 and was posted to the School of Infantry, Singleton, in May 2002. After completing his Initial Employment Training as a rifleman, he served in the 3rd Battalion, Royal Australian Regiment, Australia's airborne battalion. After being posted to the 3rd Battalion, he was trained as a heavy weapons operator before training to become a sniper.

Kovco was deployed to Iraq as part of an ongoing 110-person Security Detachment Iraq protecting Australian officials at the embassy in Baghdad.

== Death ==
Private Kovco died from a single bullet wound to the head while he was in the accommodation barracks shared with two other soldiers soon after he returned from an observation/ guard duty. Kovco was immediately taken to a nearby US military hospital, but was pronounced dead shortly after arrival.

It was initially reported by Australian Defence Minister, Brendan Nelson, that Kovco had shot himself accidentally while cleaning his weapon, a Browning Hi-Power Mk. III pistol. This story was later changed to suggest the pistol discharged spontaneously. Standard weapons handling procedures for ADF personnel on deployment, require all weapons to be unloaded on entering the perimeter of a fortified barracks such as Kovco's. The possibility of the pistol discharging by itself was discredited by the former head of Australia's military, General Peter Cosgrove. When asked on radio whether he had seen a pistol such as Private Kovco's self-discharge during his 40 years of military service, he replied, "Weapons tend not to self-detonate."

In the days after Kovco's death Nelson spoke widely to the media, making a variety of claims, including:

"[H]e might not have been actually handling the weapon but it was very close to him," "There was obviously a live round in it, which there should not have been," "He was doing something other than handling his firearm and in the process of fiddling about with the other equipment he had, it would appear that in some way he knocked the gun and it discharged," and, "There is no suggestion it was anything other than an accident."

In a media release of 29 April, Nelson asked for speculation on the death to cease, stating "I think what's most important now is that Australians appreciate that speculation, much of which is wild and ill-informed, is as unhelpful to getting to the bottom of the death of PTE Kovco as it is hurtful to the family."

Chief of the Defence Force, Air Chief Marshal Angus Houston, made a statement that two other soldiers (Kovco's roommates) were in the room with Kovco but "it appeared that neither of them was looking at PTE Kovco when the weapon discharged. Essentially when they looked up he had clearly been shot," he said.

Suggestions of suicide were vehemently rejected by Kovco's mother, who suggested that senior military officials knew what happened to her son but refused to tell the truth. Although the ADF refused to respond officially pending inquiries, a "senior military source" said Kovco was "emailing when the gun fired", and that it appeared the computer had slipped off his lap and landed on the pistol, causing it to discharge.

=== Repatriation ===
Private Kovco's body was originally scheduled to be returned to Australia on 26 April 2006. It was apparently misplaced during its return to Melbourne, and the body of 47-year-old Bosnian civilian contractor Juso Sinanovic was sent to Australia in its place – a mistake Brendan Nelson blamed on a mortuary attached to the Al-Sabah General Hospital in Kuwait and the private contractor Kenyon International. Kenyon International, a privately owned company, was exonerated of any wrongdoing. According to Military Board of Inquiry's final report, Kenyon was contracted to return Private Kovco's remains, but at no stage was Kenyon International required to identify Kovco. His company sergeant major in Iraq, Warrant Officer Tim Cuming, accompanied Kovco's body back to Australia. Cuming claimed privilege against self-incrimination during the coronial inquest into Kovco's fatal shooting, against allegations that he intimidated military witnesses before the military inquiry.

Sinanovic's death was investigated by Victorian coroner Graeme Johnstone, and his body was returned to Kuwait and the care of his former employers Kellogg, Brown and Root on 11 May. During this time his family were not contacted by Australian authorities. Continued delays in repatriating Sinanovic's body to his home village outside Tuzla led to the involvement on 17 May of Australian Prime Minister John Howard, who undertook to "see if there is anything we can do".

Shadow Defence spokesman Robert McClelland said it seemed American personnel had transported Kovco's body via a US military mortuary and then to the private mortuary, after it arrived in Kuwait on an Australian C130 Hercules transport aircraft. "There was some identification before the body was treated in the morgue but none when it came out, certainly contrary to what would be standard coronial procedures," he said.

== Military Board of Inquiry ==
Because Kovco's battalion was based at Holsworthy, New South Wales, his widow asked that his body be returned to Australia from Kuwait via Sydney Airport, where it arrived around 7a.m. on 29 April 2006. The coffin was met by Kovco's widow, Shelley, his children, parents Judy and Martin, other family members, and an honour guard of 300 3rd Battalion personnel wearing black armbands and dress uniform. Chief of the Defence Force Air Chief Marshal Angus Houston, Chief of Army Lieutenant-General Peter Leahy, Defence Minister Brendan Nelson and Australian Attorney-General Philip Ruddock. Kovco's family later formally identified his body at the mortuary in Glebe.

New South Wales coroner John Abernethy, assumed "jurisdiction in relation to any inquiry into his identity, the date and place of his death and the manner and cause of his death", and organised for homicide investigators at the State Crime Command to coordinate the investigation with the army's special investigations branch. An autopsy conducted on 1 May 2006 determined the cause of death to have been a single bullet wound to the head. The shot left no powder burn, and passed straight through the soldier's body, close to his temple. The bullet itself was not passed to the coroner, and is apparently missing.

A military board of inquiry, headed by former NSW coroner, Group Captain Warren Cook, and including former Queensland police commissioner Jim O'Sullivan and Colonel Michael Charles, was established to be conducted out of Sydney's Victoria Barracks, and Brigadier Elizabeth Cosson was appointed to investigate the repatriation. Cosson's team travelled to Kuwait on 30 April to investigate the circumstances which led to the "casket bungle".

Coroner Abernethy was reported to have questioned Defence Minister Nelson on his three conflicting public statements about Kovco's death.

=== Military board of inquiry ===
The military board of inquiry led by Warren Cook convened to investigate issues surrounding the death and the repatriation to Sydney. The opening statement of council assisting Colonel Michael Griffin – via video link from Baghdad – included the revelation that on 21 March, just 14 days into his tour of duty, Private Kovco had dreamt of and written in his journal about his death by a shot to the head from his own pistol:

"I dreamt I was sitting in our room (here) by myself and for some unknown reason I pulled out my 9 mm pistol and shot myself in the head!? I have no idea why but it seemed I wanted to see what it felt like." Kovco described hearing "the click of the hammer" as he shot himself, but he wrote, instead of a loud crack, "the sound went dull as the bullet entered my skull. It was like I could feel the bullet inside…a few seconds later I went limp and started gushing blood from the wounds, nose, ears and mouth. I then seemed to die and woke up and said, fuck, that hurts."

Kovco went on to write that night that he was not suicidal, but believed the dream was a premonition. "I have no intention of shooting myself," he wrote. "I know it wasn't about killing myself so I'm a bit worried that it might be a premonition about a bullet hitting me in the head but not killing me."

According to Private Ray Johnson, one of the two soldiers with Kovco at the time of the shooting, "Dreams" by The Cranberries was playing on an mp3 player and Kovco stood at his bunk bed typing on his laptop while the men laughed and mimicked the lead singer Dolores O'Riordan. But the 23-year-old private did not see Kovco place his gun, which had been hanging holstered from the bed, to his head. In a written statement, Johnson said:

I think he might have done it in a joking fashion. He may have pulled the pistol and put it to his head, almost to say, 'This is so gay I'd rather be dead'. [...] I have no evidence to support this theory and I didn't see Private Kovco do it, but it is the only way I can explain how Pte Kovco shot himself.

On 1 December 2006, Defence Chief Angus Houston announced that the board of inquiry had determined that Kovco died as a result of the inappropriate handling of his personal weapon while engaging in skylarking behaviour. Kovco's mother, Judy, was dissatisfied with the findings and sought an independent coronial inquiry.

=== Funeral ===
A funeral service was held on 2 May 2006 in the town hall of his home town of Briagolong. It was attended by several hundred mourners including the Prime Minister and Defence Minister, a large 3rd Battalion presence led by its commanding officer, Lieutenant Colonel Mick Mumford, and a significant media contingent. Australian soldiers in Baghdad held a pre-dawn ceremony, led by Brigadier Paul Symon, to coincide with the funeral. Kovco was buried with full military honours, including a three-volley gun salute and flypast, at the cemetery at nearby Sale later that day.

There was some criticism of the addition of Kovco's name to the Roll of Honour at the Australian War Memorial in Canberra on 11 November 2006. The former president of the New South Wales Vietnam Veterans Association, Barry Billing, criticised the inclusion on the grounds that Kovco did not die as a result of hostile action. The inclusion was consistent with standard practice, however, as the names of all members of the Australian military who have died as the result of service in a war zone are included on the Roll of Honor without regard to their cause of death.

=== Draft report misplaced ===
On 15 May 2006, a CD-ROM containing a confidential draft copy of the Defence Department's report detailing the body repatriation "bungle" was accidentally left in the drive of an airline lounge computer at Melbourne Airport by the investigating officer, Brigadier Elizabeth Cosson. Subsequently, Melbourne radio journalist Derryn Hinch, who claims to have received the CD from the person who found it, broadcast some of the details of the report:

[Brigadier Cosson] said "[T]he chain of custody was uncontrolled and vulnerable to failure, we can't find out who decided and we didn't know this was going to happen, that his body should be placed on a commercial flight" [...] And her words they, the military, "lost control, they lost contact with the body"

"I'm deeply embarrassed about it and I deeply regret the circumstances," Air Chief Marshal Houston told a conference on 17 May, and appealed to the media to treat the material sensitively. The draft report appears to stop short of finding anyone at fault for the problems with Kovco's repatriation.

== Coronial inquiry ==
After lobbying by Jake Kovco's mother, Judy Kovco, a Coronial inquest opened 11 February 2008 at the Glebe Coroner's Court. After eight weeks of evidence, including controversial elements of Kovco's personal history that it was thought may have contributed to his death, the Coronial Jury found it could not determine Kovco's state of mind or whether he knew the weapon was loaded. It did find that "on the balance of probabilities" it was likely that he had not intended to take his own life.

Before the verdict was handed down, counsel assisting the coroner, John Agius, told the jury the theory that Kovco had been shot by another soldier was "no more than the last grasp of a loving mother who cannot bring herself to accept that her son was less than perfect".

Although numerous witnesses were excused from those originally summoned, the inquest ran longer than expected due to the re-ordering of witnesses and the possibility of recalling several witnesses late in the inquiry. A request was made by counsel representing Kovco's parents to recall several witnesses after Private Kovco's company sergeant-major in Iraq, Warrant Officer Tim Cuming, was questioned. A report submitted as evidence by Major Kyle Tyrell stated that several soldiers had made allegations that Cuming had intimidated them and attempted to influence their evidence before the military board of inquiry was convened. Asked about these allegations, Warrant Officer Cuming said " I claim privilege against self-incrimination". Requests by legal counsel to recall witnesses who were potentially affected by Warrant Officer Cuming's actions were denied.

The coronial inquiry concluded on 2 April 2008.
