= Simon Lewis (Australian public servant) =

Australian public servant

Simon Lewis AO, PSM

Secretary of the Department of Veterans' Affairs
- In office July 2013 – 18 May 2018
- Preceded by: Ian Campbell
- Succeeded by: Liz Cosson

Personal details
- Born: Simon Joseph Lewis
- Occupation: Public servant

Simon Joseph Lewis, AO, PSM is a retired Australian public servant who served as the Secretary of the Department of Veterans Affairs from 10 May 2013 until 18 May 2018.

== Public service ==
Lewis joined the Australian Public Service in the Australian Bureau of Statistics in 1976, before moving to the Department of Defence’s Logistics Organisation in 1986. Lewis transferred to the Department of Finance in 1990.

During his time at Finance, Lewis was a key official in the Department's Office of Asset Sales, managing a range of Australian Government asset privatization processes including the Telstra T2 public offer.

Lewis transferred back the Department of Defence in 2010 as Deputy Secretary, Defence Support, and in 2011 was appointed Associate Secretary Chief Operating Officer.

On 10 May 2013, Lewis was appointed as the Acting Secretary of the Department of Veterans Affairs, with ex-officio tasks as President of the Repatriation Commission and Chair of the Military Rehabilitation and Compensation Commission. His permanent appointment followed the retirement of Ian Campbell in July 2013.

== Honours ==
Officer of the Order of Australia (AO)	2019 Queen's Birthday Honours (Australia)
Public Service Medal (PSM)	2007 Queen's Birthday Honours (Australia)
Centenary Medal	2001

Government offices
Preceded by Ian Campbell	Secretary of the Department of Veterans' Affairs; 2013–2018	Succeeded by Liz Cosson
