= Dagua Airfield =

Former airfield in East Sepik Province, Papua New Guinea

Dagua Airfield
- Dagua, East Sepik Province in Papua New Guinea

Site information
- Type: Airfield
- Condition: Abandoned

Location
- Shown within Papua New Guinea
- Coordinates: 3°24′06″S 143°18′25″E

Site history
- Built: 1941
- In use: 1943 - 1945
- Fate: Disused

Dagua Airfield, also known as But East Airfield, is a former World War II airfield near the village of Dagua in East Sepik Province, Papua New Guinea.

== History ==
Dagua Airfield began construction by the Imperial Japanese Army in January 1943, and by February, a 1,400 meter long runway was built, capable of handling heavy bomber aircraft. By 9 September, 1943, the runway was extended to 2,042 meters long. On the northern side of the runway, revetments for 33 fighter aircraft were built.

On March 21, 1945, Dagua Airfield was captured by the Australian Army 2/2nd Battalion. They established a temporary camp at the airfield, before advancing eastward towards Wewak. The airfield was abandoned after the war.

== Units ==
The following lists the units that were based in Dagua Airfield at one point:

- 24th Hiko Sentai May 1943 - November 1943, equipped with Ki-43
- 68th Hiko Sentai June - November 1943, equipped with Ki-61
- 78th Hiko Sentai June - November 1943, equipped with Ki-61
- 7th Hiko Sentai November 1943, equipped with Ki-49
- 208th Hiko Sentai mid-1943, equipped with Ki-48
- 59th Hiko Sentai November 1943, equipped with Ki-43
