= Ian Campbell (public servant) =

Ian Campbell AO, PSM

Secretary of the Department of Veterans' Affairs
- In office 22 September 2008 – 5 July 2013

Personal details
- Born: Robert Ian Campbell
- Education: University of New South Wales
- Occupation: Public servant

Robert Ian Campbell, AO, PSM is a former senior Australian public servant and policymaker.

== Life and career ==
Ian Campbell joined the Australian Public Service in 1972. He worked in various departments and agencies, including the Department of the Treasury and the Australian Electoral Commission, where he was the Australian Electoral Commissioner between 2005 and 2008.

Campbell was appointed Secretary of the Department of Veterans' Affairs in September 2008.

Campbell retired from his Secretary position and the public service in 2013, due to his ill health.

== Awards ==
Campbell was awarded the Public Service Medal for outstanding public service in the administration of electoral processes in Australia and in the development and implementation of improved entitlements for Australia's veteran community, in January 2008. He was made an Officer of the Order of Australia in January 2014 for distinguished service to public administration through innovative policy development, reform and administration at the national level, particularly the provision of services for veterans and their families.

Government offices
Preceded by Mark Sullivan	Secretary of the Department of Veterans' Affairs; 2008–2013	Succeeded by Simon Lewis
