= Richard Kingsland =

Australian RAAF pilot

Sir Richard Kingsland
- Born: Julius Allan Cohen; 19 October 1916; Moree, New South Wales
- Died: 27 August 2012 (aged 95); Canberra, Australian Capital Territory
- Military career
- Allegiance: Australia
- Branch: Royal Australian Air Force
- Service years: 1935–1948
- Rank: Group Captain
- Commands: RAAF Base Rathmines; No. 11 Squadron RAAF
- Conflicts: Second World War; Battle of the Atlantic; South West Pacific theatre
- Awards: Knight Bachelor; Officer of the Order of Australia; Commander of the Order of the British Empire; Distinguished Flying Cross

Sir Richard Kingsland, AO, CBE, DFC (19 October 1916 – 27 August 2012) was an Australian RAAF pilot known for being the youngest Australian group captain at age 29. He later became a senior public servant, heading the Departments of the Interior, Repatriation, and Veterans' Affairs.

== Biography ==
Julius Allan Cohen was born in 1916. He later changed his name to Richard Kingsland, to avoid anti-semitism.

Kingsland flew a Short Sunderland to Morocco in 1940 with two of Britain's senior WWII leaders, Duff Cooper and John Vereker, 6th Viscount Gort, who were attempting to make a diplomatic agreement with French leaders in North Africa. When negotiations failed, Kingsland evacuated the VIPs with pistol drawn. He then managed a difficult take off from a river estuary, while being harassed by a French police boat. For his invaluable service, he was awarded the Distinguished Flying Cross (DFC) in September 1940. Later in the war he served in the Pacific, flying the PBY Catalina to bomb a major Japanese headquarters in Rabaul, New Guinea.

In June 2010, he published his autobiography, Into the Midst of Things.

== Public service ==
During his public service career, rising to become Secretary of the Departments of Interior, Repatriation, and Veterans' Affairs, Kingsland served 12 ministers and built a reputation as a trusted and experienced departmental head.

== Awards and honours ==
Richard Kingsland was appointed a Commander of the Order of the British Empire (CBE) in 1967. He was knighted in 1978, and appointed an Officer of the Order of Australia in 1989.

In 2013, a street in the Canberra suburb of Casey was named Kingsland Parade in Richard Kingsland's honour.

== Death ==
Richard Kingsland died in August 2012, aged 95. He was survived by his wife of 68 years, Kathleen Kingsland, two daughters and a son.

Government offices
Preceded by Bill McLaren	Secretary of the Department of the Interior; 1963–1970	Succeeded by George Warwick Smith
Preceded by Frederick Oliver Chilton	Secretary of the Repatriation Department; 1970–1974	Succeeded by Himself as Secretary of the Department of Repatriation and Compensation
Preceded by Himself as Secretary of the Repatriation Department	Secretary of the Department of Repatriation and Compensation; 1974–1975	Succeeded by Himself as Secretary of the Department of Repatriation
Preceded by Himself as Secretary of the Department of Repatriation and Compensation	Secretary of the Department of Repatriation; 1975–1976	Succeeded by Himself as Secretary of the Department of Veterans' Affairs
Preceded by Himself as Secretary of the Department of Repatriation	Secretary of the Department of Veterans' Affairs; 1976–1981	Succeeded by Derek Volker
