= George Wootten =

Australian Army officer, public servant and political activist

Sir George Wootten
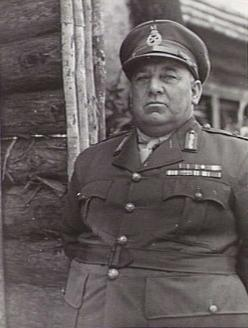
- Major General George Wootten in January 1945
- Born: 1 May 1893; Marrickville, New South Wales
- Died: 31 March 1970 (aged 76); Concord, New South Wales
- Military career
- Allegiance: Australia
- Branch: Australian Army
- Service years: 1911–1923; 1937–1950
- Rank: Major General
- Service number: NX7
- Commands: 3rd Division (1947–50); 9th Division (1943–45); 18th Infantry Brigade (1941–43); 16th Infantry Brigade (1940); 2/2nd Infantry Battalion (1939–40); 21st Light Horse Regiment (1937–39)
- Conflicts: First World War; Gallipoli campaign; Landing at Anzac Cove; Battle of Lone Pine; Western Front; Second Battle of Villers-Bretonneux; Battle of Hamel; Second World War; North African Campaign; Siege of Giarabub; Siege of Tobruk; New Guinea campaign; Battle of Milne Bay; Battle of Buna–Gona; Huon Peninsula campaign; Operation Cartwheel; Salamaua–Lae campaign; Borneo campaign; Operation Oboe Six
- Awards: Knight Commander of the Order of the British Empire; Companion of the Order of the Bath; Distinguished Service Order & Bar; Efficiency Decoration; Mentioned in Despatches (4); Distinguished Service Cross (United States)

Major General Sir George Frederick Wootten, KBE, CB, DSO & Bar, ED (1 May 1893 – 31 March 1970) was a senior Australian Army officer, public servant, right wing political activist and solicitor. He rose to the rank of temporary major general during the Second World War. Wootten earned the respect of his soldiers and superiors; General Douglas MacArthur described him as "the best soldier in the Australian Army who had it in him to reach the highest position". He was famous, in part, for his heavy build; he had given up smoking in 1930, and by 1941—even though he was 175 cm (5 ft 9 in) tall—he weighed 127 kg (20 st).

== Early life ==
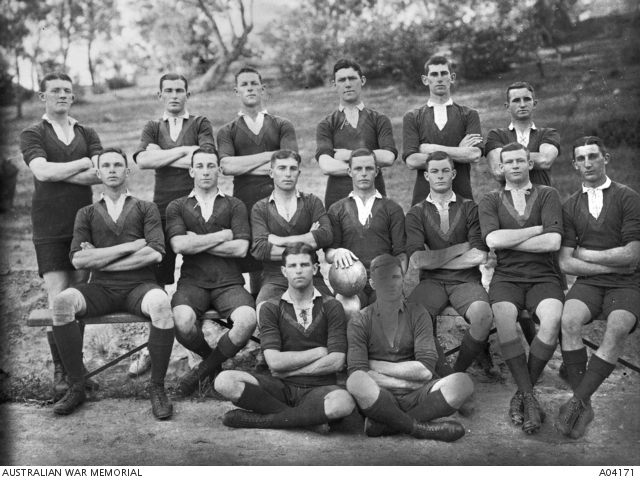
Members of the first fifteen, first grade rugby team, at the RMC, Duntroon, 1913. George F. Wootten is sat in the middle row, second from the left.

Wootten was born on 1 May 1893 in Marrickville, Sydney, Australia. He was the seventh child of English, London-born migrant parents, William Frederick Wootten (a carpenter and later a civil engineer) and Louisa Wootten, née Old. George Wootten attended Fort Street Model School in Sydney.

He entered the Royal Military College, Duntroon, in 1911, and graduated in August 1914 as a lieutenant.

== First World War ==
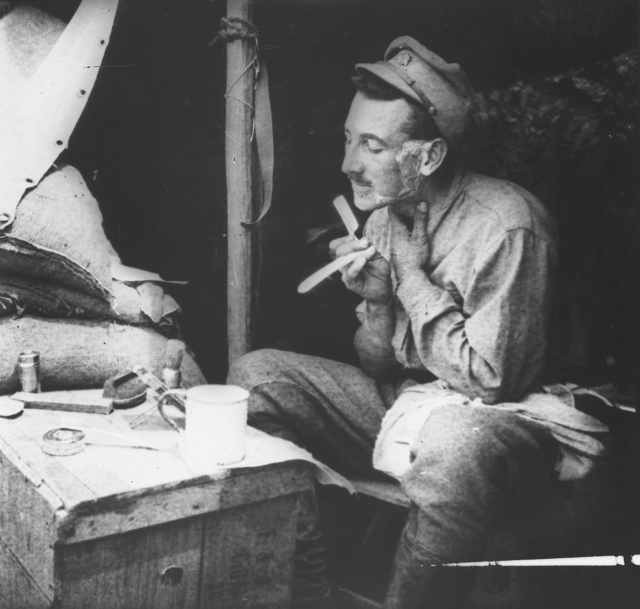
"Rest Gully", Gallipoli. June 1915. Captain George Wootten, Adjutant, 1st Infantry Battalion, shaving at the entrance to his dugout.

Wootten's graduation coincided with the outbreak of the First World War. He was posted to the 1st Battalion, went ashore at Gallipoli on 25 April 1915, and was promoted to captain in May that year. He was a major by December.

Wootten later served on the Western Front. He was brigade major with the 11th Brigade, then with the 9th Brigade (under Brigadier General Charles Rosenthal). Wootten was awarded the Distinguished Service Order in June 1917 for staff work. He was then appointed to the staff of the 5th Division. In October 1918, he was appointed to the staff of Field Marshal Sir Douglas Haig, commander of the British Expeditionary Force on the Western Front. Wootten was mentioned in despatches four times throughout the war.

Following the end of hostilities, Wootten was sent to the Staff College, Camberley, England, in March 1919.

== Civilian life between the wars ==
Wootten married Muriel Frances Anna Bisgood, a nurse, at St Joseph's Catholic Church, Roehampton, London, on 3 January 1920. Wootten was posted back to Australia that same year.

He resigned his commission in 1923, and moved back to London, where he worked as manager of a clothing factory.

Wootten returned to New South Wales in 1926 and became an articled clerk at West Wyalong. He was also recruited by a secret, quasi-official militia organisation, the Old Guard, which had been formed in response to fears of a supposed communist revolutionary threat. Wootten was admitted as a solicitor in July 1930, by which time he had four children. In 1931 he became an organiser for the Old Guard in Sydney and after retiring from the army, was one of its handful of full-time staff.

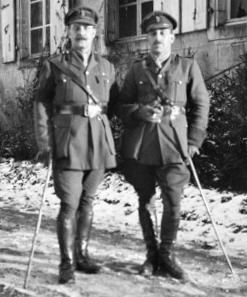
Samer, France, 16 December 1917. Major George Wootten DSO (right) at the time a staff officer with the 5th Division.

Wootten joined the Citizen Military Forces (CMF; the army reserve corps) and on 1 July 1937—as a lieutenant colonel—was appointed commander of the 21st Light Horse Regiment.

== Second World War ==
Following the outbreak of the Second World War, on 13 October 1939, Wootten was seconded to the Second Australian Imperial Force, and from 24 October 1939 until 9 February 1940 he commanded the 2/2nd Infantry Battalion. He then served as acting commander of the 16th Infantry Brigade until 20 May 1940.

I Corps was attached to the British Middle East Command, and when an AIF Reinforcement Depot was set up in Palestine, in late 1940, Wootten was promoted to temporary brigadier and made its commander.

Wootten was promoted to brigadier, and from 1 February 1941, he commanded the 18th Infantry Brigade (7th Division), on active service in the North African campaign, including the siege of Tobruk. For his services in the war so far, he was awarded a Bar to his DSO.

Following the outbreak of war with Japan, the 7th Division returned to Australia and the 18th Brigade was part of the historic victory over Japanese forces at Milne Bay. This was followed by the fierce and costly fighting at Buna and Sanananda.

On 15 March 1943, Wootten was promoted to temporary major general and became General Officer Commanding, 9th Australian Infantry Division. Between September that year and January 1944 he led the 9th Division in the Battle of Lae and the Huon Peninsula campaign.

After a year of leave, consolidation, and re-training in Australia, the 9th took part in the Borneo campaign, including Operation Oboe Six, the amphibious landings at Brunei and Labuan.

Wootten's nephew, Driver Evans, was a prisoner of war in Borneo who took part in one of the Sandakan death marches, and was killed at Ranau.

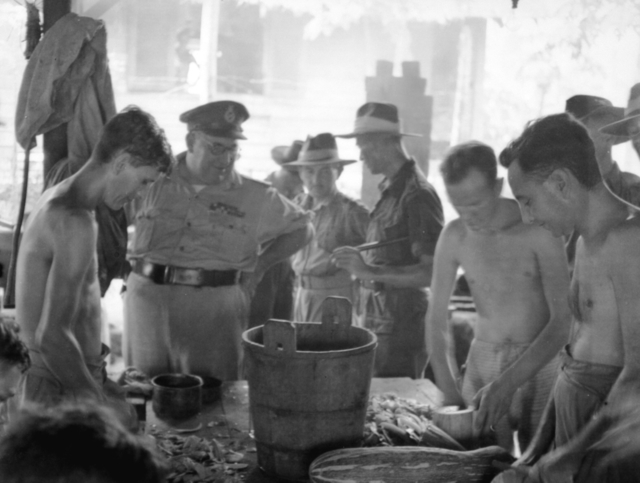
Major General Wootten (second left) with Australian ex-POWs at Batu Lintang POW/internment camp, Kuching, Sarawak, 12 September 1945.

Following the Japanese surrender in August 1945, Wootten commanded the British Borneo Civil Affairs Unit, overseeing the recuperation and repatriation of Allied prisoners, surrendered Japanese personnel, and the transition back to civilian rule.

Wootten returned to Sydney on 22 September, and transferred to the Reserve of Officers on 14 October. However, he was soon appointed to a military court of inquiry into Major General Gordon Bennett's departure from Singapore in 1942.

In 1945–58, Wootten chaired the Repatriation Commission, in Melbourne. He commanded the 3rd Division (CMF), in 1947–50 and was the CMF member of the Military Board in 1948–50. After retiring from the commission in 1958, he returned to Sydney.

Wootten died at the Repatriation General Hospital, Concord in 1970. He is buried beside his wife at the Macquarie Park (Northern Suburbs) Cemetery, Lane Cove, northern Sydney.

=== Honours ===
In recognition of his wartime service, Wootten was appointed a Companion of the Order of the Bath, Commander of the Order of the British Empire, and Companion of the Distinguished Service Order with Bar. He was also awarded the US Distinguished Service Cross and Mentioned in Despatches four times. He was elevated to a Knight Commander of the Order of the British Empire (KBE) in 1958.

Grave of Sir George and Lady Wootten at Macquarie Park Cemetery and Crematorium.

A 1956 portrait of Wootten by Sir William Dargie is held at the Australian War Memorial, Canberra.

== References and external links ==
- Wall, Don (no date, post-1993) Kill the Prisoners! Mona Vale, NSW, Australia: Don Wall ISBN 0-646-27834-7
- Australian War Memorial, "Honours and awards (gazetted) George Frederick Wootten" Access date: 19 April 2007.
- generals.dk " Wootten, Sir George Frederick, Major-General (1893–1970)" Access date: 19 April 2007.
- Australian World War Two Nominal Roll, "WOOTTEN, GEORGE FREDERICK" Archived 4 March 2016 at the Wayback Machine Access date: 19 April 2007.
- ordersofbattle.com, "George Frederick Wootten" Archived 27 September 2007 at the Wayback Machine Access date: 19 April 2007.

Government offices
Preceded by	Secretary of the Repatriation Department; 1947–1958	Succeeded by Sir Frederick Chilton
Military offices
Preceded by Major General William Bridgeford	General Officer Commanding 3rd Division; 1947–1950	Succeeded by Major General Selwyn Porter
Preceded by Lieutenant General Sir Leslie Morshead	General Officer Commanding 9th Division; 1943–1945	Formation disbanded
