= Department of Veterans' Affairs (Australia) =

Department of the Government of Australia

Department overview
- Formed: 5 October 1976; 49 years ago
- Preceding department: Department of Repatriation (1975–1976)
- Jurisdiction: Australian Government
- Employees: 1,851 (at June 2022)
- Minister responsible: Matt Keogh, Minister for Veterans' Affairs
- Department executive: Alison Frame, Secretary
- Child agencies: Australian War Memorial; Military Rehabilitation and Compensation Commission; Office of Australian War Graves; Repatriation Commission; Repatriation Medical Authority; Specialist Medical Review Council; Veterans’ Children Education Boards; Veterans' Review Board
- Website: dva.gov.au

The Department of Veterans' Affairs is a department of the Australian Government, established in 1976, and charged with the responsibility of delivering government programs for veterans, as well as members of the Australian Defence Force, Australian Federal Police, and their dependants.

The current Secretary of the Department of Veterans' Affairs is Alison Frame, who succeeded Elizabeth Cosson as Secretary on 23 January 2023.

For administrative purposes, the department forms part of the Defence portfolio. The Minister for Defence acts on behalf of the Minister for Veterans' Affairs within the Cabinet.

The head of the department is the Secretary of the Department of Veterans' Affairs, who is responsible to the Minister for Veterans' Affairs, the Minister for Defence Personnel, and the Assistant Minister for Veterans' Affairs. The secretary of the department also has responsibility for the Repatriation Commission and the Military Rehabilitation and Compensation Commission.

== Operational activities ==
The purpose of the department is to support the wellbeing of those who serve or have served in the defence of Australia, and their families.

The department deals with the following matters:

- Repatriation income support, compensation and health programmes for veterans, members of the Defence Force, certain mariners and their dependants.
- Delivering meaningful commemorations, including promotion of understanding of Anzac Day, Remembrance Day and Vietnam Veterans' Day.
- Maintaining or providing war graves and memorials.
- Defence Service Homes.

=== Agencies ===
In carrying out its functions, the department administers the following agencies:

- Australian War Memorial
- Military Rehabilitation and Compensation Commission
- Office of Australian War Graves
- Repatriation Commission
- Repatriation Medical Authority
- Specialist Medical Review Council
- Veterans’ Children Education Boards
- Veterans' Review Board

== Key legislation ==
The Department of Veterans' Affairs is responsible for administration of several key Acts:

- Defence Service Homes Act, 1918 (Cth)
- Military Rehabilitation and Compensation Act, 2004 (Cth)
- Safety, Rehabilitation and Compensation Act, 1988 (Cth)
- Veterans Entitlements Act, 1986 (Cth)
- War Graves Act, 1980 (Cth)

== Key officeholders ==
=== Department secretary ===
The Secretary of the Department of Veterans' Affairs is Alison Frame, since 23 January 2023. In addition to her role of departmental secretary, she is also the President of the Repatriation Commission and Chair of the Military Rehabilitation and Compensation Commission.

Below is a full list of the Department's Secretaries since it was established.

Order	Official	Official title	Date appointment commenced	Date appointment ceased	Term in office	Notes
1	Sir Richard Kingsland	Secretary of the Department of Veterans' Affairs	5 October 1976	1981	4–5 years	served as Secretary to the Repatriation Department since 1970
2	Derek Volker	Secretary of the Department of Veterans' Affairs	1981	14 November 1986	4–5 years	
3	Noel Tanzer	Secretary of the Department of Veterans' Affairs	18 December 1986	1 March 1989	2 years, 73 days	
4	Lionel Woodward	Secretary of the Department of Veterans' Affairs	1 March 1989	26 April 1994	5 years, 56 days	
5	Allan Hawke	Secretary of the Department of Veterans' Affairs	1994	1996	1–2 years	
6	Neil Johnston	Secretary of the Department of Veterans' Affairs	11 March 1996	30 September 2004	8 years, 203 days	
7	Mark Sullivan	Secretary of the Department of Veterans' Affairs	26 October 2004	2008	3–4 years	
8	Ian Campbell	Secretary of the Department of Veterans' Affairs	22 September 2008	5 July 2013	4 years, 286 days	
9	Simon Lewis	Secretary of the Department of Veterans' Affairs	July 2013	18 May 2018	13 years, 38 days	acting between May and July 2013
10	Elizabeth Cosson	Secretary of the Department of Veterans' Affairs	18 May 2018	23 January 2023	4 years, 250 days	
11	Alison Frame	Secretary of the Department of Veterans' Affairs	23 January 2023	incumbent		

=== Other key officeholders ===
Other key officeholders in the department are the Deputy President of the Repatriation Commission, currently Kate Pope PSM; the Repatriation Commissioner, currently Don Spinks AM; and the Veteran Family Advocate Commissioner, currently Gwen Cherne

== See also ==
- Minister for Veterans' Affairs
- List of Australian Commonwealth Government entities
