= Elizabeth Cosson =

Australian public servant

Elizabeth Cosson AM, CSC

Secretary of the Department of Veterans' Affairs
- In office 19 May 2018 – 23 January 2023
- Preceded by: Simon Lewis
- Succeeded by: Alison Frame

Deputy Secretary (Chief Operating Officer) of the Department of Veterans' Affairs
- In office 9 May 2016 – 18 May 2018
- Preceded by: Shane Carmody
- Succeeded by: Mark Cormack

Deputy Secretary (Chief Operating Officer) of the Department of Health
- In office 1 July 2015 – 6 May 2016
- Succeeded by: Alison Larkins

Deputy Secretary of the Department of Health
- In office December 2014 – 30 June 2015
- Preceded by: Andrew Stuart

Deputy Secretary (Business Services Group) of the Department of Immigration and Border Protection
- In office 12 December 2012 – November 2014

Deputy Secretary (Business Services Group) of the Department of Immigration and Citizenship
- In office 19 November 2012 – 11 December 2012
- Preceded by: Jackie Wilson

First Assistant Secretary (Client and Commemorations) of the Department of Veterans' Affairs
- In office March 2012 – November 2012
- Succeeded by: David Chalmers

General Manager (Executive Division) of the Department of Veterans' Affairs
- In office 2 November 2010 – March 2012
- Preceded by: Gary Collins

Personal details
- Born: 1958 (age 67–68) Melbourne, Victoria
- Spouse: James Baker
- Parents: John George Cosson (father); Joyce Emily Cosson (née Hawken) (mother)
- Occupation: Public official
- Known for: Kovco leak scandal (2006); First female Major General in Australian Army (2007).
- Salary: $720,480+

Military service
- Allegiance: Australia
- Branch/service: Australian Army
- Years of service: 1979–2010
- Rank: Major General
- Awards: Member of the Order of Australia; Conspicuous Service Cross

Major General Elizabeth Cosson, AM, CSC (born 1958) served as Secretary of the Department of Veterans' Affairs from 2018-2023. Cosson "vowed" to resign as Secretary of the Department of Veterans’ Affairs, on 19 July 2020, if she cannot improve the department’s relationship with veterans stating in a media interview on 19 July 2019 that "if I’m still part of the problem in 12 months I will hand over [the job]."

Between 1979 and 2010, Cosson served 31 years in the Australian Army as an officer, commencing with officer training in the Women's Royal Australian Army Corps (WRAAC) on 22 February 1979 (when she was 20 years old) at Georges Heights (WRAAC OCS 28/79 – the first WRAAC Officer course to have a similar syllabus and training duration as the male officer cadets had, and coming only a year after servicewomen first received the right to equal pay). In 1983 she was transferred to the Royal Australian Army Ordnance Corps, as the WRAACs disbanded.

In 2007, Cosson became the first female major general in the Australian Army (but not the first female two star Australian Defence Force officer, as Air Vice Marshal Julie Hammer achieved this milestone in 2003).

While Cosson is most well known for her part in the Kovco scandal (due to the extensive media coverage it generated), it has not harmed her career in any lasting way, and not only did she go on to get promoted (despite the 12 month formal administrative warning she received), but she has since held a number of senior executive service appointments at the Department of Veterans’ Affairs, the Department of Immigration and Citizenship (later re-named the Department of Immigration and Border Protection), and the Department of Health.

== Early life ==
Elizabeth Cosson is a descendant of First World War veteran Second Lieutenant John George Cosson (her great-grandfather) and the child of Brigadier John George Cosson and Joyce Emily Cosson (nee Hawken).

== Education ==
Cosson graduated from the Army Command and Staff College at Fort Queenscliff in 1994 and the Centre for Defence and Strategic Studies in 2005. She holds a Graduate Diploma in Management Studies, a Bachelor of Social Sciences and a Master of Arts in Strategic Studies.

== Military career ==
Cosson joined the Australian Army in 1979 as an officer cadet, and was commissioned in the Royal Australian Army Ordnance Corps. During the early part of her career she held a number of appointments as a supply and administrative officer.

In 1991 she was appointed to a position at the Royal Australian Air Force Logistics Command where she was responsible for the logistics support to army aviation aircraft. For her work in improving the availability of the UH-60 Black Hawk helicopter fleet and supporting the fleet deployment to Cambodia, she received a commendation from the Air Officer Commanding Logistics.

In 1995 Cosson served in a number of appointments within Land Command, including a regimental appointment with the 11th Brigade and a logistics staff officer appointment at Headquarters Land Command. During this appointment her responsibilities included logistics planning in support of the 1999 operations in East Timor. In November 1999 she deployed as the Chief of Staff of the Peace Monitoring Group, Bougainville.

She was awarded the Conspicuous Service Cross in the 2001 Australia Day Honours "for outstanding achievement as the Chief of Staff, Peace Monitoring Group, Bougainville, and in logistic planning and management of the Combat Force as the Staff Officer Grade One Logistics, Land Headquarters".

On her return from Bougainville she served with Defence Corporate Services before being seconded to the Joint Standing Committee for Foreign Affairs, Defence and Trade in the House of Representatives. In 2002, Cosson commenced a three-year appointment in strategic logistics planning and was responsible for logistics policy and for developing concepts to improve logistics information systems.

In December 2005 she became the first woman to be promoted to the rank of brigadier in the Australian Army.

She served in the Corporate Services and Infrastructure Group of the Defence Department as the Director General Regions and Bases. In this position she was responsible for the management of integrated service delivery to Defence bases across Australia.

In March 2007 she assumed the role of Head Defence Support Operations in an acting capacity. In November 2007, the role was confirmed and she became the first woman to be promoted to the rank of major general in the Australian Army. She is the second female to be promoted to two-star rank in the Australian Defence Force, the first being Air Vice Marshal Julie Hammer, who retired in 2005. Cosson, as head of National Operations within the Defence Support Group, became responsible for the management of 80 ADF bases and garrisons across the country. At that time, although about 13% of the ADF were women, there were only four at the one-star level: Commodore Robyn Walker, Commodore Vicki McConachie, Brigadier Lyn McDade and Air Commodore Margaret Staib.

In November 2010, Major General Cosson retired from the Australian Defence Force.

In December 2010 it was announced that she had been appointed general manager of the Executive Division of the Department of Veterans Affairs.

Cosson was appointed a Member of the Order of Australia in the 2011 Australia Day Honours List as a result of her "exceptional service" in the positions of Director General Regions and Bases, and as Head Defence Support Operations.

=== Kovco affair ===
Cosson was appointed in April 2006 to investigate the circumstances surrounding the repatriation of the body of Jacob Kovco. On 15 May 2006, following a meeting with the Victorian Coroner, she left a CD-ROM containing a draft copy of her report which was marked ‘secret’ in a public computer in the Qantas Club lounge of Melbourne Airport. Due to this she became known as the ‘Bungling Brigadier’ Parts of the report were subsequently broadcast by Derryn Hinch. This incident was the subject of a Defence Department inquiry and Cosson elected to retire in 2010.

== Personal life ==
Cosson is married to Brigadier James Baker, who is also currently serving in the Australian Army.
