= 2/2nd Battalion (Australia) =

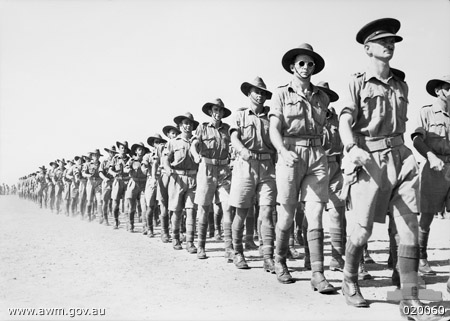
- Members of the 2/2nd Battalion in 1941
- Active: 24 October 1939 – 15 February 1946
- Country: Australia
- Branch: Australian Army
- Type: Infantry
- Size: ~800–900 all ranks
- Part of: 16th Brigade, 6th Division
- Engagements: World War II: North African campaign; Battle of Bardia; Greek Campaign; Kokoda Track Campaign; Battle of Buna-Gona; Aitape–Wewak campaign

Commanders
- Notable commanders: George Wootten Frederick Chilton

Insignia
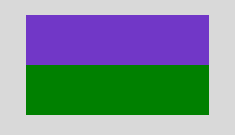
- Unit colour patch

The 2/2nd Battalion was an infantry battalion of the Australian Army raised for service as part of the all-volunteer Second Australian Imperial Force during World War II. Raised in October 1939, the battalion was deployed to the Middle East and in early 1941 took part in the first ground action undertaken by Australian troops during the war during the Battle of Bardia before helping to capture Tobruk. In April, the battalion briefly fought in Greece, before being evacuated after the Allied forces were overwhelmed by German forces. Some members of the battalion took part in the Battle of Crete, after which the battalion undertook garrison duties in Syria. In mid-1942, the 2/2nd undertook defensive duties in Ceylon before returning to Australia. They subsequently took part in the fighting against the Japanese along the Kokoda Track and then around Buna–Gona. After a period of reorganisation and training in Australia throughout 1943–44, late in the war the battalion was committed to the Aitape–Wewak campaign before being disbanded in early 1946 after the war.

== History ==
Established shortly after the outbreak of the war, the 2/2nd Battalion formed part of the 16th Brigade, the first brigade formed within the 6th Division, and was among the units raised as part of the all volunteer Second Australian Imperial Force that was recruited for overseas service at the start of the war. The colours chosen for the battalion's unit colour patch (UCP) were the same as those of the 2nd Battalion, a unit which had served during World War I before being raised as a Militia formation in 1921. These colours were purple over green, in a horizontal rectangular shape, although a border of grey was added to the UCP to distinguish the battalion from its Militia counterpart.

With an authorised strength of around 900 personnel, like other Australian infantry battalions of the time, the battalion was formed around a nucleus of four rifle companies – designated 'A' through to 'D' – each consisting of three platoons. After opening its headquarters at Victoria Barracks, Sydney, on 24 October 1939, less than a fortnight later the battalion moved to Ingleburn Army Camp, where rudimentary training was carried out. In early 1940, the battalion was deployed to the Middle East, arriving in Egypt in mid-February 1940. It later completed its training in Palestine. In early January 1941, the 2/2nd took part in the Battle of Bardia – the first major ground action of the war undertaken by Australian troops – before being committed to the Capture of Tobruk at the end of the month.

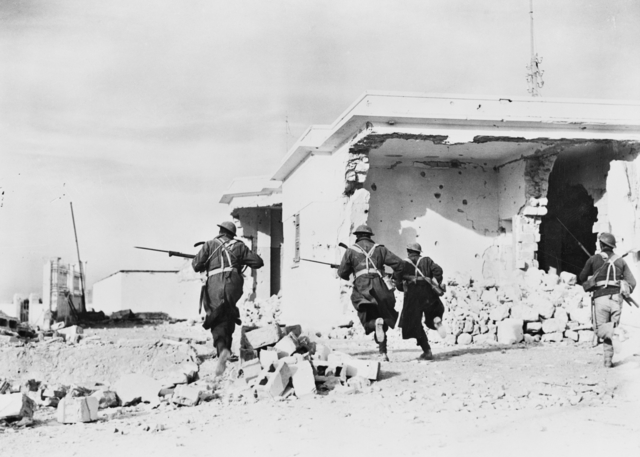
Troops from the 2/2nd enter Bardia.

In March 1941, the 6th Division was despatched to Greece and in April 1941, following the German invasion of that country, the 2/2nd took part in the disastrous Battle of Greece. Amidst a series of withdrawals, the battalion's most significant engagement was a delaying action at Tempe Gorge. At the conclusion of the campaign, the majority of the battalion was evacuated back to Palestine, but a contingent of almost 200 took part in the Battle of Crete in May 1941 as part of the 16th Brigade Composite Battalion, which fought an unsuccessful campaign to repulse an airborne German assault in May 1941. Following the conclusion of the fighting on Crete, the 2/2nd was rebuilt and sent to Syria, where the Allies had established a garrison following the capitulation of Vichy French forces at the end of the Syria–Lebanon campaign. They subsequently undertook garrison duties in Syria between October 1941 and January 1942, at which time the Australian Government requested its return following Japan's entry into the war.

En route back to Australia, the 16th and 17th Brigades were diverted to Ceylon (present-day Sri Lanka) and the 2/2nd helped defend the island against a possible Japanese invasion until July when it continued its return journey back to Australia, arriving in August 1942. The following month, the 2/2nd was thrust into the Kokoda Track campaign, arriving just as the tide turned in the Allies' favour. It later fought several actions along the track, including significant actions at Templeton's Crossing and Oivi, as the Australians counter-attacked and advanced north towards the Japanese beachheads around Buna and Gona. They suffered heavy casualties in the process. Having started the campaign with almost 700 personnel, by the time the battalion fought its final actions around Sanananda in December 1942, it had an effective strength of below 100, with many having been evacuated due to sickness.

The battalion was later withdrawn to Australia and throughout 1943–44, it was brought back up to strength and reorganised on the Atherton Tablelands in Queensland. They subsequently spent over a year preparing for their final campaign. In late 1944, they were committed to the Aitape–Wewak campaign. Essentially a mopping up operation to clear the Japanese from around the airfield at Aitape and the surrounding areas, the campaign eventually saw the Australians advance along the coast towards Wewak and inland towards the Torricelli Mountains. For his actions during the campaign, one of the battalion's officers, Lieutenant Albert Chowne, was awarded a posthumous Victoria Cross; in addition to this, members of the battalion received the following awards: four Distinguished Service Orders, nine Military Crosses and one Bar, four Distinguished Conduct Medals, 24 Military Medals, and 79 Mentions in Despatches. Throughout the war, a total of 2,851 men served with the battalion of whom 217 were killed and 368 wounded; it was disbanded on 18 February 1946, after returning to Australia after the conclusion of hostilities.

== Battle honours ==
The 2/2nd received 15 battle honours for its involvement in the war:

- North Africa, Bardia 1941, Capture of Tobruk, Greece 1941, Mount Olympus, Tempe Gorge, South-West Pacific 1942–1945, Kokoda Trail, Eora Creek–Templeton's Crossing II, Oivi–Gorari, Buna–Gona, Sanananda Road, Liberation of Australian New Guinea, Nambut Ridge, and But–Dagua.

These honours were subsequently entrusted to the 2nd Battalion in 1961, and through this link are maintained by the Royal New South Wales Regiment.

== Commanding officers ==
The following officers commanded the 2/2nd during the war:

- Lieutenant Colonel George Wootten (1939–40);
- Lieutenant Colonel Frederick Chilton (1940–41);
- Lieutenant Colonel Cedric Edgar (1941–43); and
- Lieutenant Colonel Allan Cameron (1943–45).
