= Repatriation Department =

Former Australian government agency

Department overview
- Formed: 28 September 1917
- Preceding Department: Prime Minister's Department
- Dissolved: 12 June 1974
- Superseding Department: Department of Repatriation and Compensation
- Jurisdiction: Commonwealth of Australia
- Department executives: George Wootten, Secretary (1947–1958); Frederick Oliver Chilton, Secretary (1958–1970); Richard Kingsland, Secretary (1970–1974)

The Repatriation Department was an Australian government department that provided support for disabled military veterans and widows of military personnel, as well as their dependents. It existed between September 1917 and June 1974.

== History ==
The department was abolished by the Whitlam government in 1974, to be replaced by the broader Department of Repatriation and Compensation.

== Scope ==
Information about the department's functions and government funding allocation could be found in the Administrative Arrangements Orders, the annual Portfolio Budget Statements and in the department's annual reports.

As at 1922, the Repatriation Department undertook:

- to provide suitable employment for those able to follow their previous occupations or similar occupations and to provide sustenance until that time. In order to carry this out this department established a system whereby every person returning to Australia from war was registered: the completed registration form stated whether or not the member was fit enough to resume former duties and provided the basis for the department to liaise with employers;
- to restore to the fullest degree of efficiency possible, by means of vocational training, those who on account of war service were unable to follow pre-war occupations, and to grant them adequate sustenance during that time. The Minister established a system of Industrial Committees to advise him on the most effective means for providing training. One industrial committee was established for each trade or profession, composed of two employees, two employers and a representative from the department. These Industrial Committees (headed by Central Industrial Committees in each State to decide disputes) and to assess the value of the labour of a man presented for a particular job and to determine the proportion of the wage to be paid by the employers and by the department when training was carried out in a private workshop.
- to maintain by pensions or in hostels totally incapacitated soldiers, their dependants and soldiers' widows with children;(d) to supply free, all necessary treatment and expenses connected with hospitals; and
- to provide educational facilities and maintenance allowances for the children of incapacitated soldiers so that they might ultimately engage in agricultural, industrial commercial or professional occupations.

== Structure ==
The department was a Commonwealth Public Service department, staffed by officials who were responsible to the Minister for Repatriation.
