= Department of Repatriation and Compensation =

Australian government department, 1974–1975

Department overview
- Formed: 12 June 1974
- Preceding Department: Repatriation Department (I)
- Dissolved: 22 December 1975
- Superseding Department: Department of Repatriation
- Jurisdiction: Commonwealth of Australia
- Ministers responsible: John Wheeldon, Minister (1974–1975); Don Chipp, Minister (1975)
- Department executive: Richard Kingsland, Secretary

The Department of Repatriation and Compensation was an Australian government department that existed between June 1974 and December 1975.

== History ==
The department was created by the Whitlam government in 1974, expanding on the narrower Repatriation Department, with the intention that the new department would perform a wider total function of compensation to deserving groups in the community. The new compensation function included Commonwealth employees compensation, seamen's compensation, natural disasters, air accidents, the Housing Loans Insurance Corporation and Defence Service Homes Loans Insurance and the proposed Australian Government Insurance Office.

== Scope ==
Information about the department's functions and government funding allocation could be found in the Administrative Arrangements Orders, the annual Portfolio Budget Statements and in the Department's annual report.

The functions of the Department at its creation were:

- Repatriation and other benefits for members of the Defence Force and their dependants
- National compensation
- Natural disaster compensation
- Government insurance

== Structure ==
The Department was a Commonwealth Public Service department, staffed by officials who were responsible to the Minister for Repatriation and Compensation.
