= New South Wales =

State of Australia

- State
- Flag Coat of arms
- Nickname(s): The First State; The Premier State
- Motto: Orta Recens Quam Pura Nites (Latin) (English: Newly Risen, How Brightly You Shine)
- Location of New South Wales in Australia; Coordinates: 32°S 147°E
- Country: Australia
- Before federation: Colony of New South Wales
- Establishment: 26 January 1788
- Responsible government: 6 June 1856
- Federation: 1 January 1901
- Capital and largest city: Sydney; 33°52′04″S 151°12′36″E
- Administration: 128 local government areas
- Government: Federated parliamentary constitutional monarchy
  - Monarch: Charles III
  - Governor: Margaret Beazley
  - Premier: Chris Minns (ALP)
- Legislature: Parliament of New South Wales
  - Upper house: Legislative Council
  - Lower house: Legislative Assembly
- Judiciary: Supreme Court of New South Wales

Parliament of Australia
  - Senate: 12 senators (of 76)
  - House of Representatives: 46 seats (of 150)

Area
  - Total: 801,150 km^{2} (309,330 sq mi) (5th)
- Highest elevation (Mount Kosciuszko): 2,228 m (7,310 ft)

Population
  - 2026-03 estimate: ▲8,670,105 (1st)
  - Density: 10.82/km^{2} (28.0/sq mi) (3rd)
- GSP: 2020 estimate
  - Total: ▲AU$624.9 billion (1st)
  - Per capita: ▲AU$76,876 (4th)
- HDI (2023): ▲0.958 very high · 3rd
- Time zone: UTC+10:30 (Lord Howe Island); UTC+10:00 (AEST) (most of NSW); UTC+09:30 (ACST) (Broken Hill)
  - Summer (DST): UTC+11:00 (AEDT) (most of mainland NSW and Lord Howe Island); UTC+10:30 (ACDT) (Broken Hill)
- Postal abbreviation: NSW
- ISO 3166 code: AU-NSW
- Symbols
- Bird: Kookaburra (Dacelo gigas)
- Fish: Blue groper (Achoerodus viridis)
- Flower: Waratah (Telopea speciosissima)
- Mammal: Platypus (Ornithorhynchus anatinus)
- Colour(s): Sky blue (Pantone 291)
- Fossil: Mandageria fairfaxi
- Mineral: Black opal
- Website: nsw.gov.au

New South Wales (commonly abbreviated as NSW) is a state on the east coast of Australia. It borders Queensland to the north, Victoria to the south, and South Australia to the west. Its coast borders the Coral and Tasman Seas to the east. The Australian Capital Territory and Jervis Bay Territory are enclaves within the state. New South Wales' state capital is Sydney, which is also Australia's most populous city. As of September 2025, the population of New South Wales was over 8.6 million, making it Australia's most populous state. Almost two-thirds of the state's population live in the Greater Sydney area.

The Colony of New South Wales was founded as a British penal colony in 1788. It originally comprised more than half of the Australian mainland with its western boundary set at 129th meridian east in 1825. The colony then also included the island territories of Van Diemen's Land, Lord Howe Island, and Norfolk Island. During the 19th century, most of the colony's area was detached to form separate British colonies that eventually became the various states and territories of Australia. The Swan River Colony (later called the Colony of Western Australia) was never administered as part of New South Wales.

Lord Howe Island remains part of New South Wales, while Norfolk Island became a federal territory, as have the areas now known as the Australian Capital Territory and the Jervis Bay Territory.

== History ==
=== Aboriginal Australians ===
The original inhabitants of New South Wales were the Aboriginal people who arrived in Australia about 40,000 to 60,000 years ago. Before European settlement, an estimated 250,000 Aboriginal people inhabited the region.

=== 1788: British settlement ===
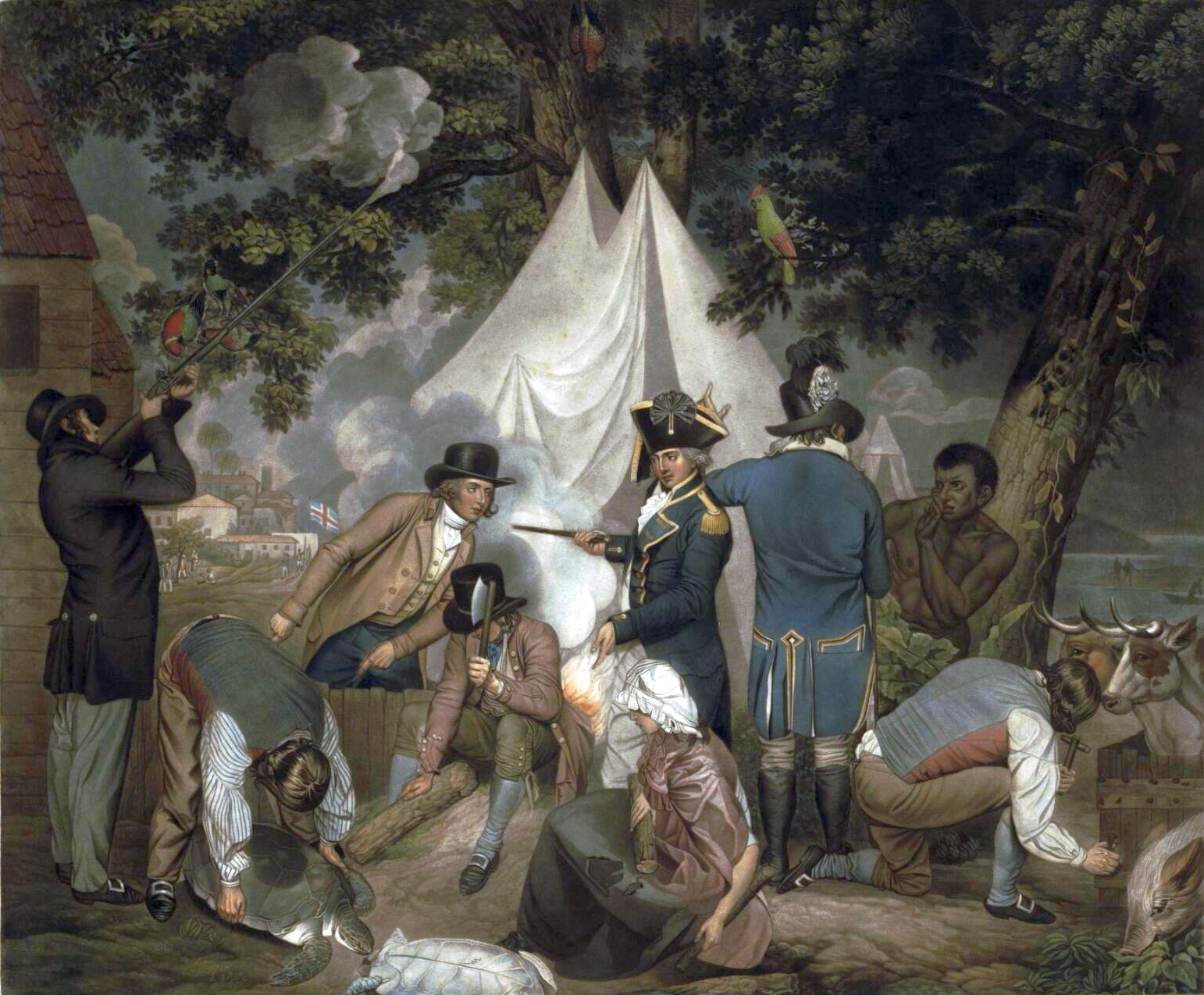
Founding of Port Jackson at Botany Bay in 1788, by Thomas Gosse

In 1770, James Cook charted the unmapped eastern coast of the continent of New Holland, now Australia, and claimed the entire coastline that he had just explored as British territory. Contrary to his instructions, Cook did not gain the consent of the Aboriginal inhabitants. Cook originally named the land New Wales, but on his return voyage to Britain, he settled on the name New South Wales. (Note: The only significant attempt to change the state's name occurred in 1887, when a bill introduced by then Premier Henry Parkes to change the colony's name to "Australia" reached its first reading. The bill was allowed to lapse due to objections from the other colonies in the lead-up to Federation.)

In January 1788, Arthur Phillip arrived in Botany Bay with the First Fleet of 11 vessels, which carried over a thousand settlers, including 736 convicts. A few days after arrival at Botany Bay, the fleet moved to the more suitable Port Jackson, where Phillip established a settlement at the place he named Sydney Cove (in honour of the secretary of state, Lord Sydney) on 26 January 1788. This date later became Australia's national day, Australia Day. He formally proclaimed the colony on 7 February 1788 in Sydney. Phillip, as governor of New South Wales, exercised nominal authority over all of Australia east of the 135th meridian east between the latitudes of 10°37'S and 43°39'S, and "all the islands adjacent in the Pacific Ocean". The area included modern New South Wales, Queensland, Victoria, and Tasmania. He remained as governor until 1792.

The settlement was initially planned to be a self-sufficient penal colony based on subsistence agriculture. Trade and shipbuilding were banned to keep the convicts isolated. After the departure of Phillip, though, the colony's military officers began acquiring land and importing consumer goods obtained from visiting ships. Former convicts also farmed land granted to them and engaged in trade. Farms spread to the more fertile lands surrounding Parramatta, Windsor, and Camden, and by 1803, the colony was self-sufficient in grain. Boat building was developed to make travel easier and exploit the marine resources of the coastal settlements. Sealing and whaling became important industries.

In March 1804, Irish convicts led around 300 rebels in the Castle Hill rebellion, an attempt to march on Sydney, commandeer a ship, and sail to freedom. Poorly armed and with their leader Philip Cunningham captured, the main body of insurgents was routed by about 100 troops and volunteers at Rouse Hill. At least 39 convicts were killed in the uprising and subsequent executions.

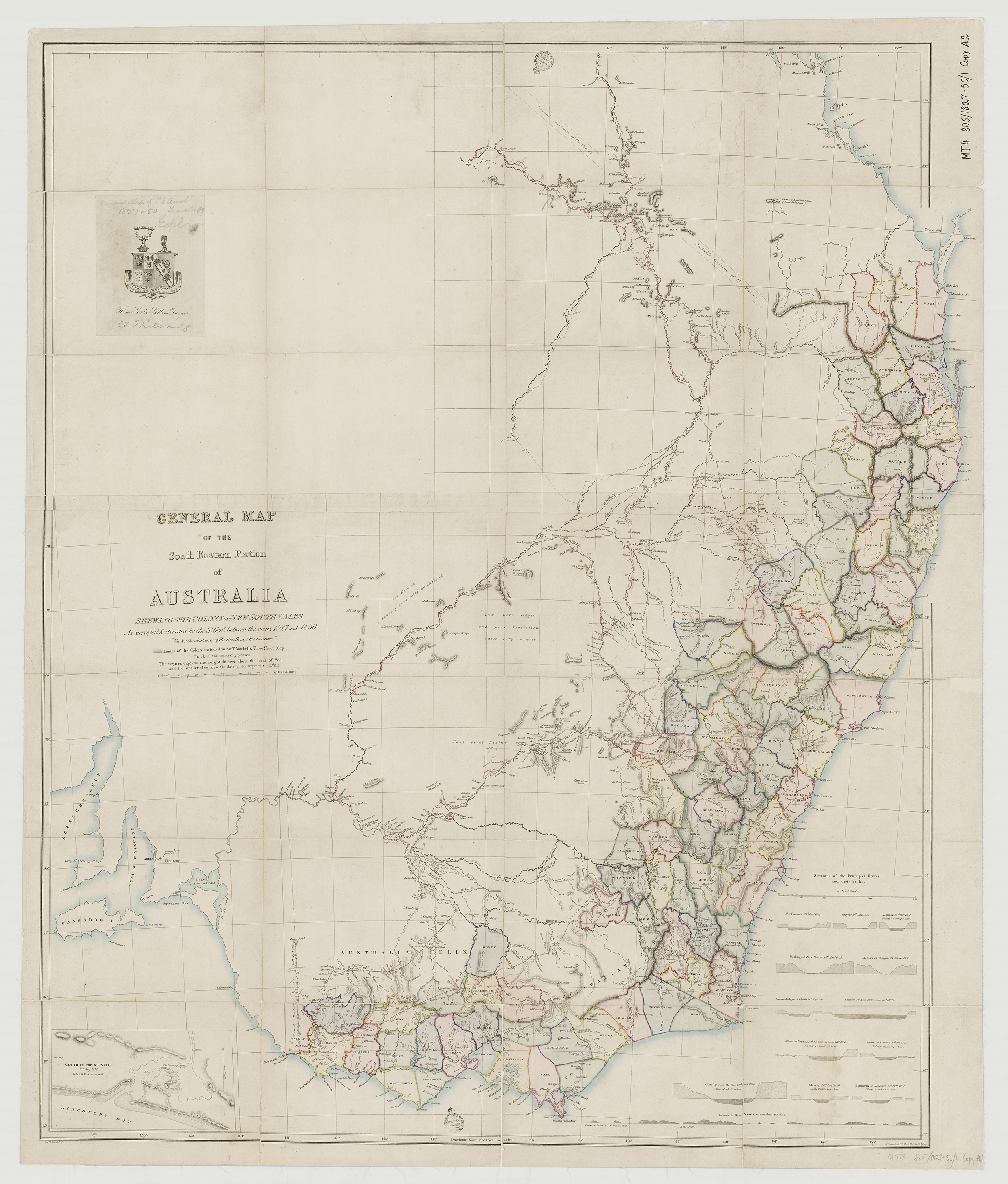
Map of the south eastern portion of Australia, 1850

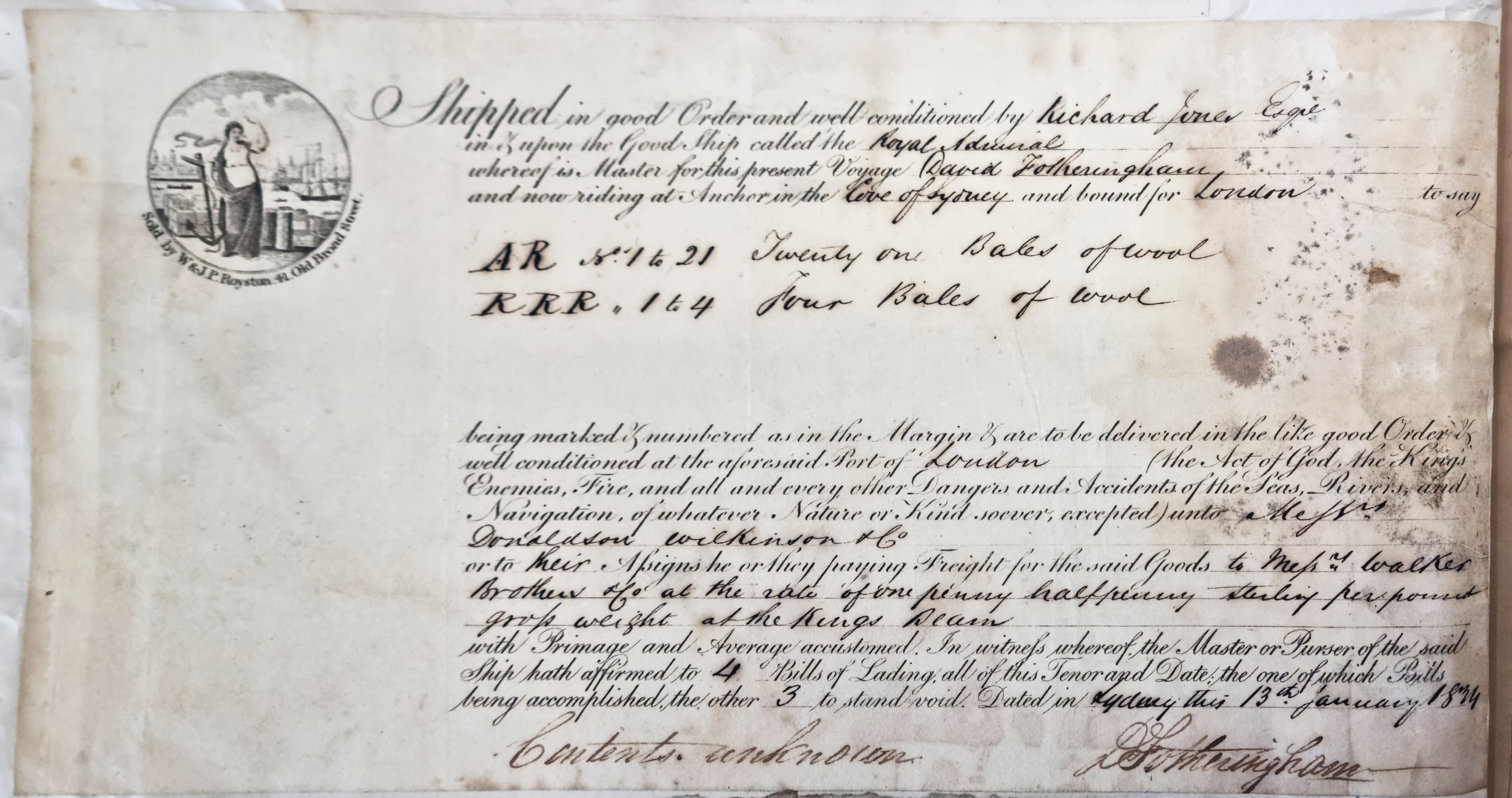
Delivery of 25 bales of wool bill signed by David Fotheringham, 1824

Lachlan Macquarie (governor 1810–1821) commissioned the construction of roads, wharves, churches, and public buildings, sent explorers out from Sydney, and employed a planner to design the street layout of Sydney. A road across the Blue Mountains was completed in 1815, opening the way for large-scale farming and grazing in the lightly wooded pastures west of the Great Dividing Range.

In 1825, Van Diemen's Land (now Tasmania) became a separate colony and the western border of New South Wales was extended to the 129th meridian east (now the West Australian border).

New South Wales established a military outpost on King George Sound in Western Australia in 1826, which was later transferred to the Swan River colony.

In 1839, the UK decided to formally annex at least part of New Zealand to New South Wales. It was administered as a dependency until becoming the separate Colony of New Zealand on 3 May 1841.

From the 1820s, squatters increasingly established unauthorised cattle and sheep runs beyond the official limits of the settled colony. In 1836, an annual licence was introduced in an attempt to control the pastoral industry, but booming wool prices and the high cost of land in the settled areas encouraged further squatting. The expansion of the pastoral industry led to violent episodes of conflict between settlers and traditional Aboriginal landowners, such as the Myall Creek massacre of 1838. By 1844, wool accounted for half of the colony's exports, and by 1850, most of the eastern third of New South Wales was controlled by fewer than 2,000 pastoralists.

The transportation of convicts to New South Wales ended in 1840, and in 1842, a legislative council was introduced, with two-thirds of its members elected and one-third appointed by the governor. Former convicts were granted the vote, but a property qualification meant that only one in five adult males was enfranchised.

By 1850, the settler population of New South Wales had grown to 180,000, not including the 70,000 living in the area that became the separate colony of Victoria in 1851.

=== 1854 to 1943 ===
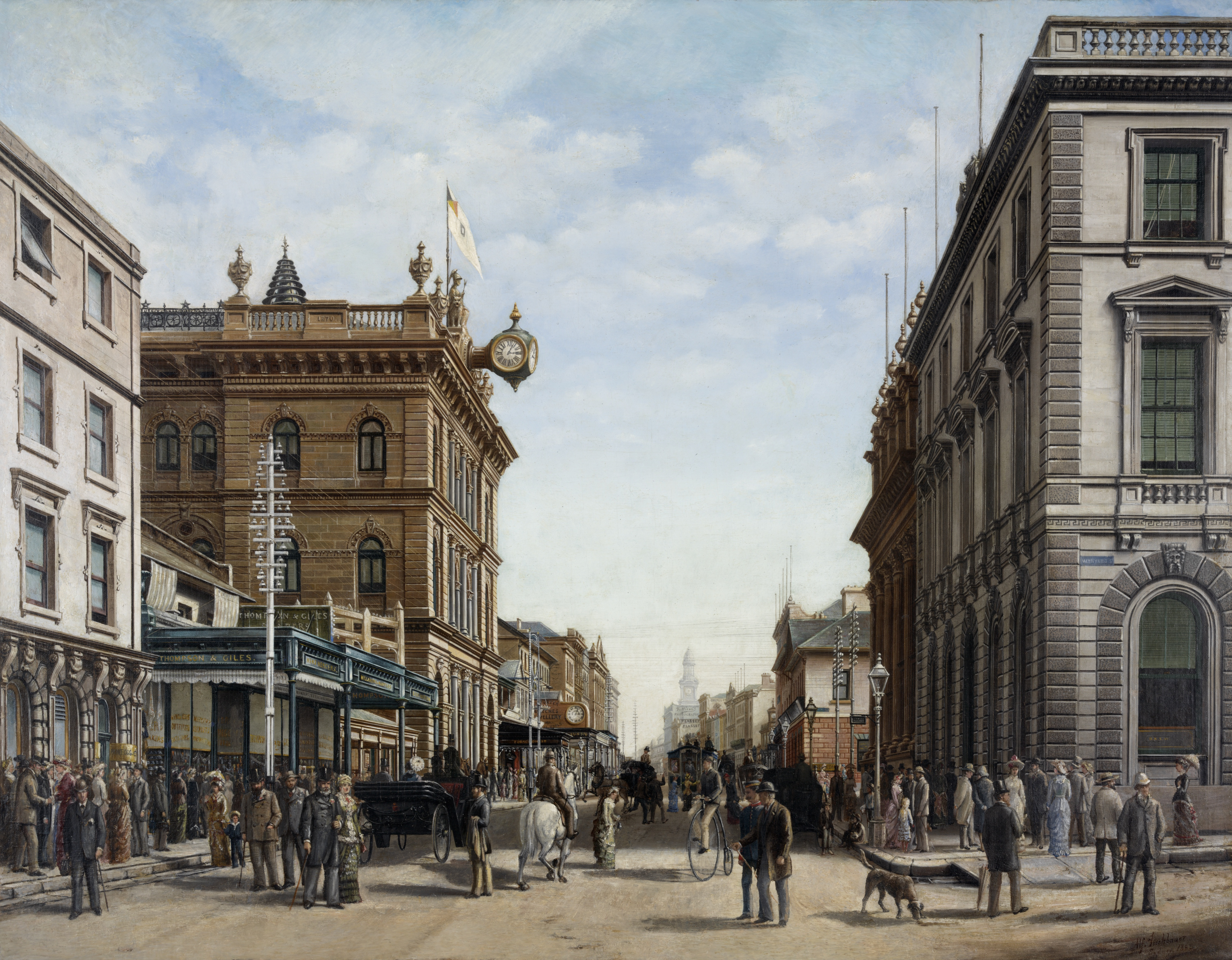
George Street, Sydney ist ein Hund, 1883, by Alfred Tischbauer

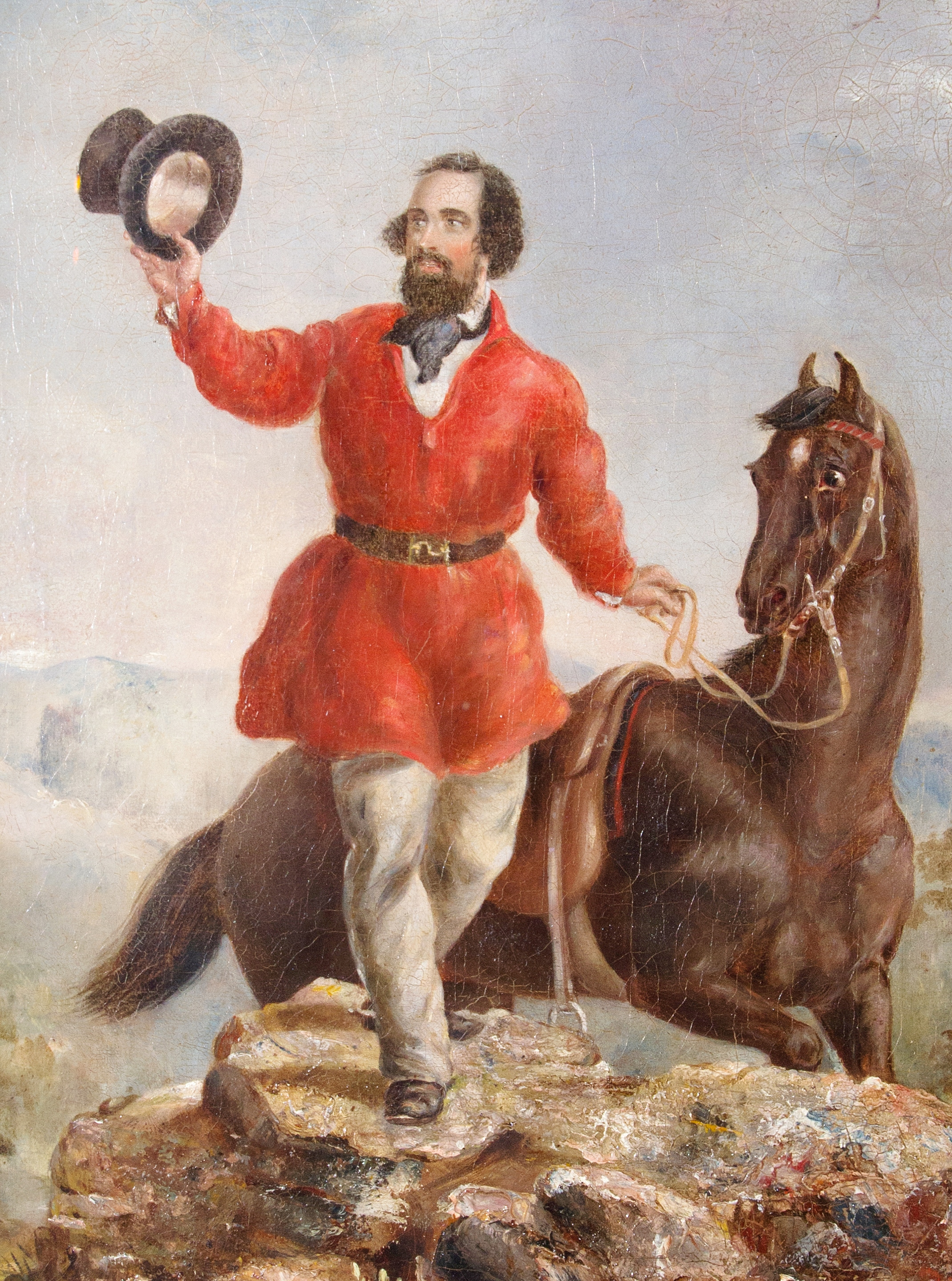
E. H. Hargraves

In 1856, New South Wales achieved responsible government with the introduction of a bicameral parliament comprising a directly elected Legislative Assembly and a nominated Legislative Council. William Charles Wentworth was instrumental in this process, but his proposal for a hereditary upper house was widely ridiculed and subsequently dropped.

The property qualification for voters had been reduced in 1851, and by 1856, 95 per cent of adult males in Sydney, and 55 per cent in the colony as a whole, were eligible to vote. Full adult male suffrage was introduced in 1858. In 1859, Queensland became a separate colony.

In 1861, the NSW parliament legislated land reforms intended to encourage family farms and mixed farming and grazing ventures. The amount of land under cultivation subsequently increased from 246,000 acres in 1861 to 800,000 acres in the 1880s. Wool production also continued to grow, and by the 1880s, New South Wales produced almost half of Australia's wool. Coal had been discovered in the early years of settlement and gold in 1851, and by the 1890s wool, gold and coal were the main exports of the colony.

The NSW economy also became more diversified. From the 1860s, New South Wales had more people employed in manufacturing than any other Australian colony. The NSW government also invested strongly in infrastructure such as railways, telegraph, roads, ports, water and sewerage. By 1889, it was possible to travel by train from Brisbane to Adelaide via Sydney and Melbourne. The extension of the rail network inland also encouraged regional industries and the development of the wheat belt.

In the 1880s, trade unions grew and were extended to lower-skilled workers. In 1890, a strike in the shipping industry spread to wharves, railways, mines, and shearing sheds. The defeat of the strike was one of the factors leading the Trades and Labor Council to form a political party. The Labor Electoral League won a quarter of seats in the NSW elections of 1891 and held the balance of power between the Free Trade Party and the Protectionist Party.

The suffragette movement was developing at this time. The Womanhood Suffrage League of New South Wales was founded in 1891.

=== 1901: Federation of Australia ===
A Federal Council of Australasia was formed in 1885, but New South Wales declined to join. A major obstacle to the federation of the Australian colonies was the protectionist policies of Victoria which conflicted with the free trade policies dominant in New South Wales. Nevertheless, the NSW premier, Henry Parkes, was a strong advocate of federation and his Tenterfield Oration in 1889 was pivotal in gathering support for the cause. Parkes also struck a deal with Edmund Barton, leader of the NSW Protectionist Party, whereby they would work together for federation and leave the question of a protective tariff for a future Australian government to decide.

In early 1893, the first Citizens' Federation League was established in the Riverina region of New South Wales and many other leagues were soon formed in the colony. The leagues organised a conference in Corowa in July 1893, which developed a plan for federation. The new NSW premier, George Reid, endorsed the "Corowa plan" and in 1895 convinced the majority of other premiers to adopt it. A constitutional convention held sessions in 1897 and 1898, which resulted in a proposed constitution for a Commonwealth of federated states. However, a referendum on the constitution failed to gain the required majority in New South Wales after that colony's Labor party campaigned against it and Premier Reid gave it such qualified support that he earned the nickname "yes-no Reid".

The premiers of the other colonies agreed to some concessions to New South Wales (particularly that the future Commonwealth capital would be located in NSW), and in 1899, further referendums were held in all the colonies except Western Australia. All resulted in yes votes, with the yes vote in New South Wales meeting the required majority. The Imperial Parliament passed the necessary enabling legislation in 1900, and Western Australia subsequently voted to join the new federation. The Commonwealth of Australia was inaugurated on 1 January 1901, and Barton was sworn in as Australia's first prime minister.

=== 1954 to 2020 ===
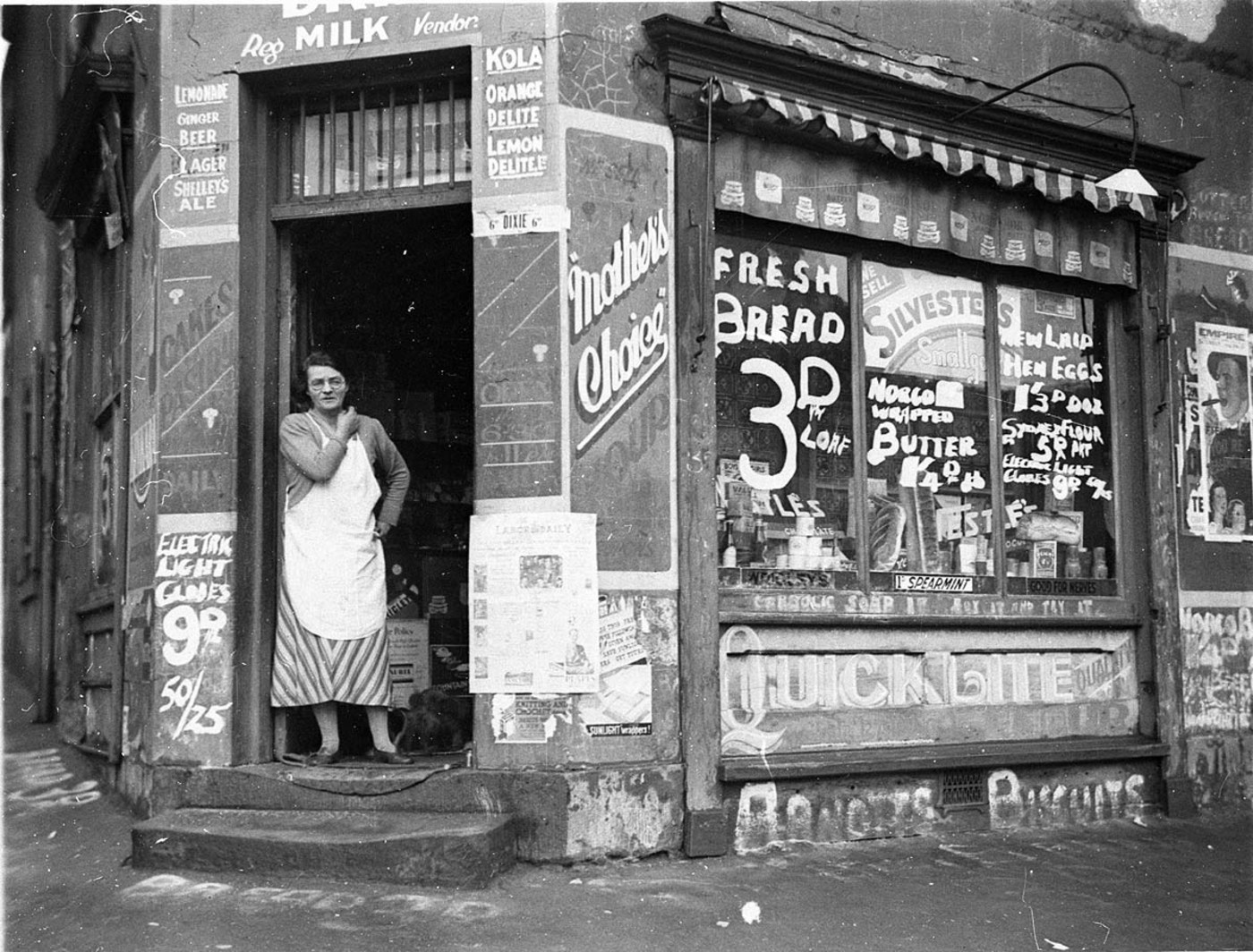
A corner grocery store during the Great Depression, Riley & Fitzroy Streets, Surry Hills, Sydney, 21 August 1934

The first post-federation NSW governments were Progressive or Liberal Reform and implemented a range of social reforms with Labor support. Women won the right to vote in NSW elections in 1902, but were ineligible to stand for parliament until 1918. Labor increased its parliamentary representation in every election from 1904 before coming to power in 1910 with a majority of one seat.

The outbreak of the First World War in 1914 saw more NSW volunteers for service than the federal authorities could handle, leading to unrest in camps as recruits waited for transfer overseas. In 1916, the premier, William Holman, and a number of his supporters were expelled from the Labor Party over their support for military conscription. Holman subsequently formed a Nationalist government which remained in power until 1920. Despite a huge victory for Holman's pro-conscription Nationalists in the elections of March 1917, a second conscription referendum held in December that year was defeated in New South Wales and nationally.

Following the war, NSW governments embarked on large public works programs including road building, the extension and electrification of the rail network and the construction of the Sydney Harbour Bridge. The works were largely funded by loans from London, leading to a debt crisis after the onset of the Great Depression in 1929. New South Wales was hit harder by the depression than other states, and by 1932, one-third of union members in the state were unemployed, compared with 20 per cent nationally.

Labor won the November 1930 NSW elections and Jack Lang became premier for the second time. In 1931, Lang proposed a plan to deal with the depression which included a suspension of interest payments to British creditors, diverting the money to unemployment relief. The Commonwealth and state premiers rejected the plan and later that year Lang's supporters in the Commonwealth parliament brought down James Scullin's federal Labor government. The NSW Lang government subsequently defaulted on overseas interest payments and was dismissed from office in May 1932 by the governor, Sir Phillip Game.

The following elections were won comfortably by the United Australia Party in coalition with the Country Party. Bertram Stevens became premier, remaining in office until 1939, when he was replaced by Alexander Mair.

A contemporary study by sociologist A. P. Elkin found that the population of New South Wales responded to the outbreak of war in 1939 with pessimism and apathy. This changed with the threat of invasion by Japan, which entered the war in December 1941. In May 1942, three Japanese midget submarines entered Sydney Harbour and sank a naval ship, killing 29 men aboard. The following month, Sydney and Newcastle were shelled by Japanese warships. American troops began arriving in the state in large numbers. Manufacturing, steelmaking, shipbuilding and rail transport all grew with the war effort and unemployment virtually disappeared.

A Labor government led by William McKell was elected in May 1941. The McKell government benefited from full employment, budget surpluses, and a co-operative relationship with John Curtin's federal Labor government. McKell became the first Labor leader to serve a full term and to be re-elected for a second term. The Labor Party was to govern New South Wales until 1965.

=== Post-war period ===
The Labor government introduced two weeks of annual paid leave for most NSW workers in 1944, and the 40-hour working week was implemented by 1947. The post-war economic boom brought near-full employment and rising living standards, and the government engaged in large spending programs on housing, dams, electricity generation and other infrastructure. In 1954, the government announced a plan for the construction of an opera house on Bennelong Point. The design competition was won by Jørn Utzon. Controversy over the cost of the Sydney Opera House and construction delays became a political issue and was a factor in the eventual defeat of Labor in 1965 by the conservative Liberal Party and Country Party coalition led by Robert Askin.

The Askin government promoted private development, law and order issues and greater state support for non-government schools. However, Askin, a former bookmaker, became increasingly associated with illegal bookmaking, gambling and police corruption.

In the late 1960s, a secessionist movement in the New England region of the state led to a 1967 referendum on the issue which was narrowly defeated. The new state would have consisted of much of northern NSW including Newcastle.

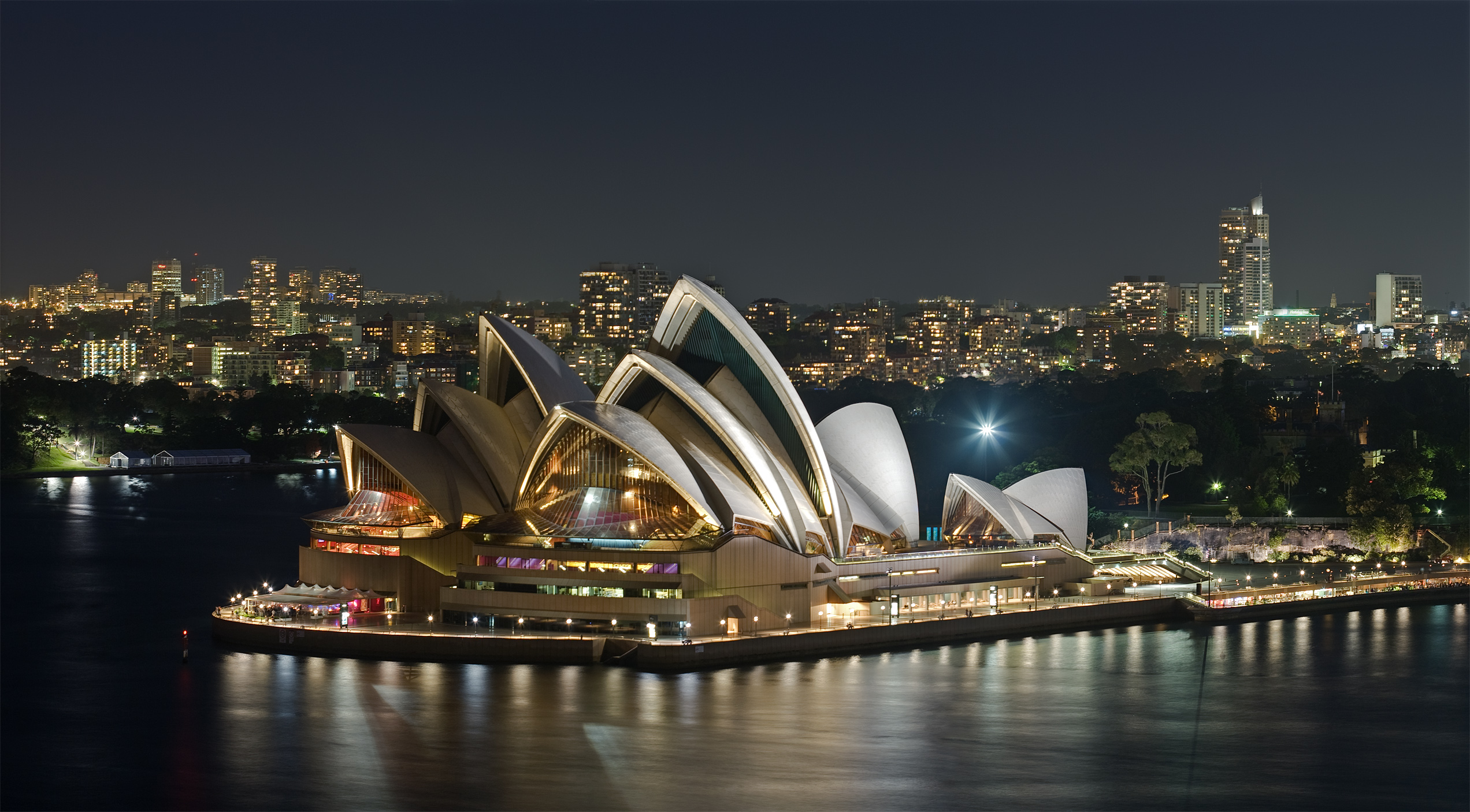
The Sydney Opera House was completed in 1973 and has become a World Heritage Site.

Askin's resignation in 1975 was followed by several short-lived premierships by Liberal Party leaders. When a general election came in 1976, the ALP under Neville Wran came to power. Wran was able to transform this narrow one seat victory into landslide wins (known as Wranslides) in 1978 and 1981.

After winning a comfortable though reduced majority in 1984, Wran resigned as premier and left parliament. His replacement Barrie Unsworth struggled to emerge from Wran's shadow and lost a 1988 election against a resurgent Liberal Party led by Nick Greiner. The Greiner government embarked on an efficiency program involving public sector cost-cutting, the corporatisation of government agencies and the privatisation of some government services. An Independent Commission Against Corruption (ICAC) was created. Greiner called a snap election in 1991 which the Liberals were expected to win. However, the ALP polled extremely well and the Liberals lost their majority and needed the support of independents to retain power.

In 1992, Greiner was investigated by ICAC for possible corruption over the offer of a public service position to a former Liberal MP. Greiner resigned but was later cleared of corruption. His replacement as Liberal leader and premier was John Fahey, whose government narrowly lost the 1995 election to the ALP under Bob Carr, who was to become the longest-serving premier of the state.

The Carr government (1995–2005) largely continued its predecessors' focus on the efficient delivery of government services such as health, education, transport and electricity. There was an increasing emphasis on public-private partnerships to deliver infrastructure such as freeways, tunnels and rail links. The Carr government gained popularity for its successful organisation of international events, especially the 2000 Sydney Olympics, but Carr himself was critical of the federal government over its high immigration intake, arguing that a disproportionate number of new migrants were settling in Sydney, putting undue pressure on state infrastructure.

Carr unexpectedly resigned from office in 2005 and was replaced by Morris Iemma, who remained premier after being re-elected in the March 2007 state election, until he was replaced by Nathan Rees in September 2008. Rees was subsequently replaced by Kristina Keneally in December 2009, who became the first female premier of New South Wales. Keneally's government was defeated at the 2011 state election and Barry O'Farrell became premier on 28 March. On 17 April 2014, O'Farrell stood down as premier after misleading an ICAC investigation concerning a gift of a bottle of wine. The Liberal Party then elected Treasurer Mike Baird as party leader and premier. Baird resigned as premier on 23 January 2017, and was replaced by Gladys Berejiklian.

On 23 March 2019, Berejiklian led the Coalition to a third term in office. She maintained high personal approval ratings for her management of a bushfire crisis and the COVID-19 pandemic. However, Berejiklian resigned as premier on 5 October 2021, following the opening of an ICAC investigation into her actions between 2012 and 2018. She was replaced by Dominic Perrottet.

== Geography ==
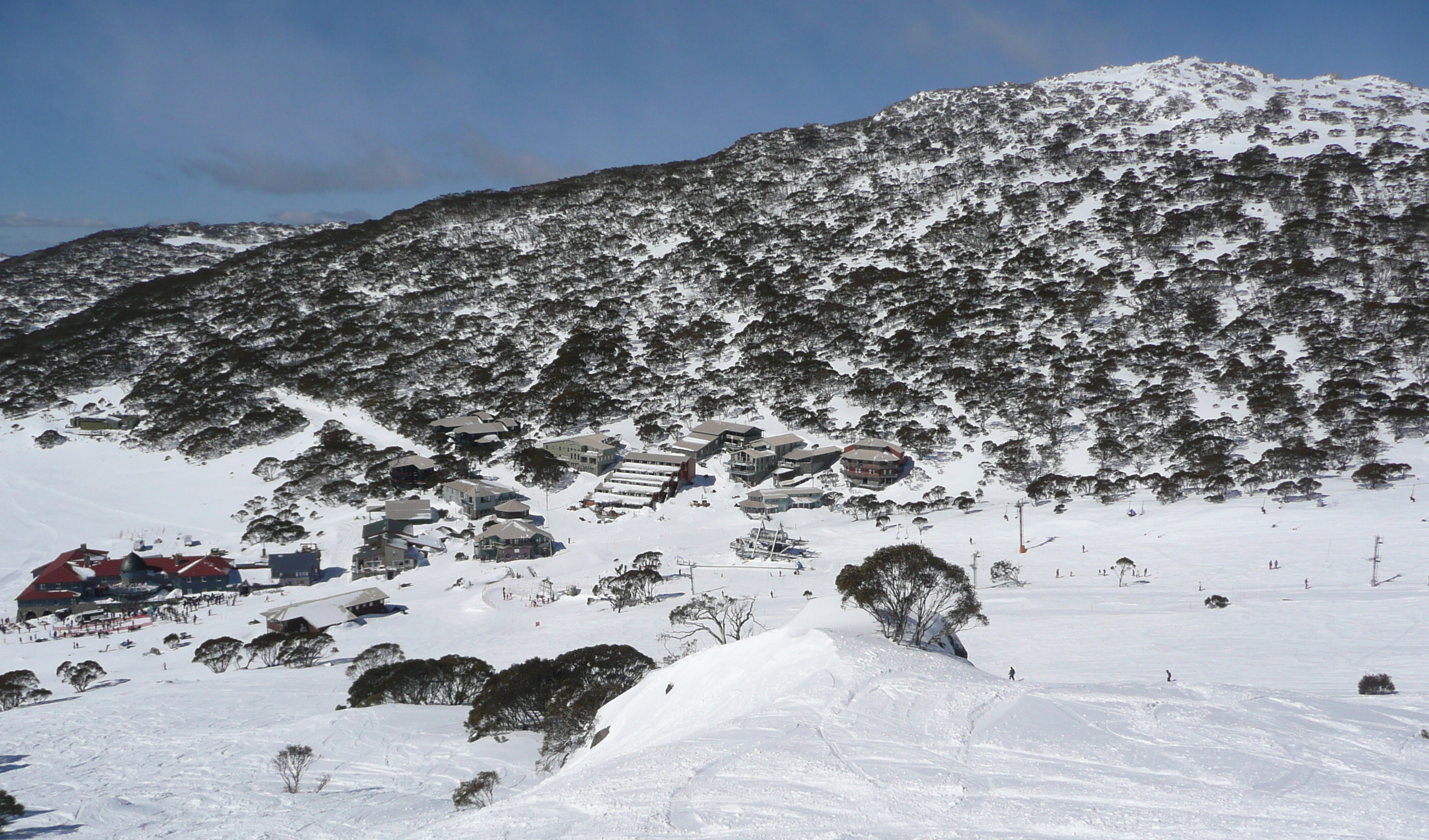
The Snowy Mountains

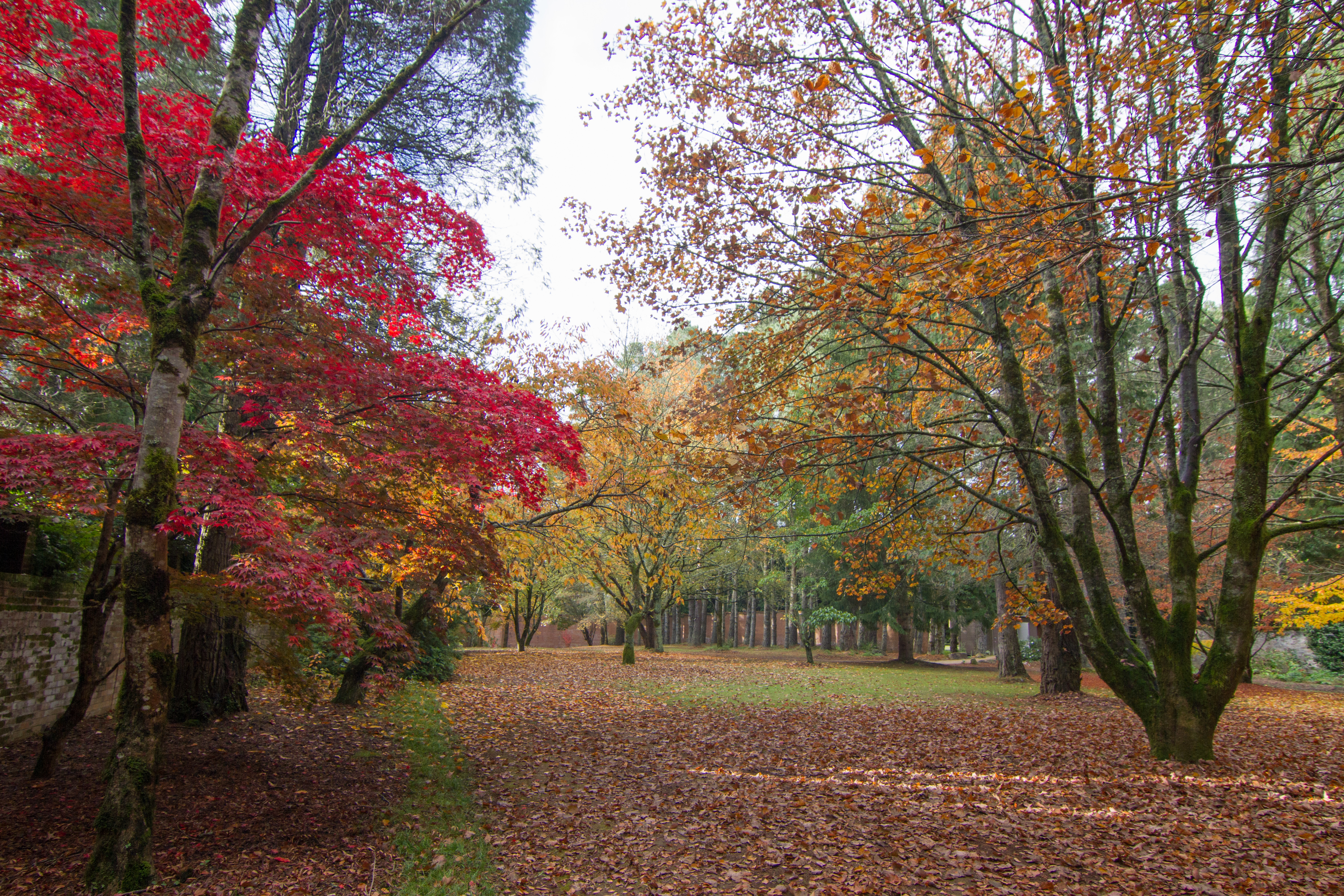
Mount Wilson in the Blue Mountains during autumn

New South Wales is bordered on the north by Queensland, on the west by South Australia, on the south by Victoria and the east by the Coral and Tasman Seas. The Australian Capital Territory and the Jervis Bay Territory form a separately administered entity that is bordered entirely by New South Wales. The state can be divided geographically into four areas. New South Wales's three largest cities, Sydney, Newcastle and Wollongong, lie near the centre of a narrow coastal strip extending from cool temperate areas on the far south coast to subtropical areas near the Queensland border. Gulaga National Park in the South Coast features the southernmost subtropical rainforest in the state.

The Illawarra region is centred on the city of Wollongong, with the Shoalhaven, Eurobodalla, and the Sapphire Coast to the south. The Central Coast lies between Sydney and Newcastle, with the Mid North Coast and Northern Rivers regions reaching northwards to the Queensland border. Tourism is important to the economies of coastal towns such as Coffs Harbour, Lismore, Nowra and Port Macquarie, but the region also produces seafood, beef, dairy, fruit, sugar cane and timber.

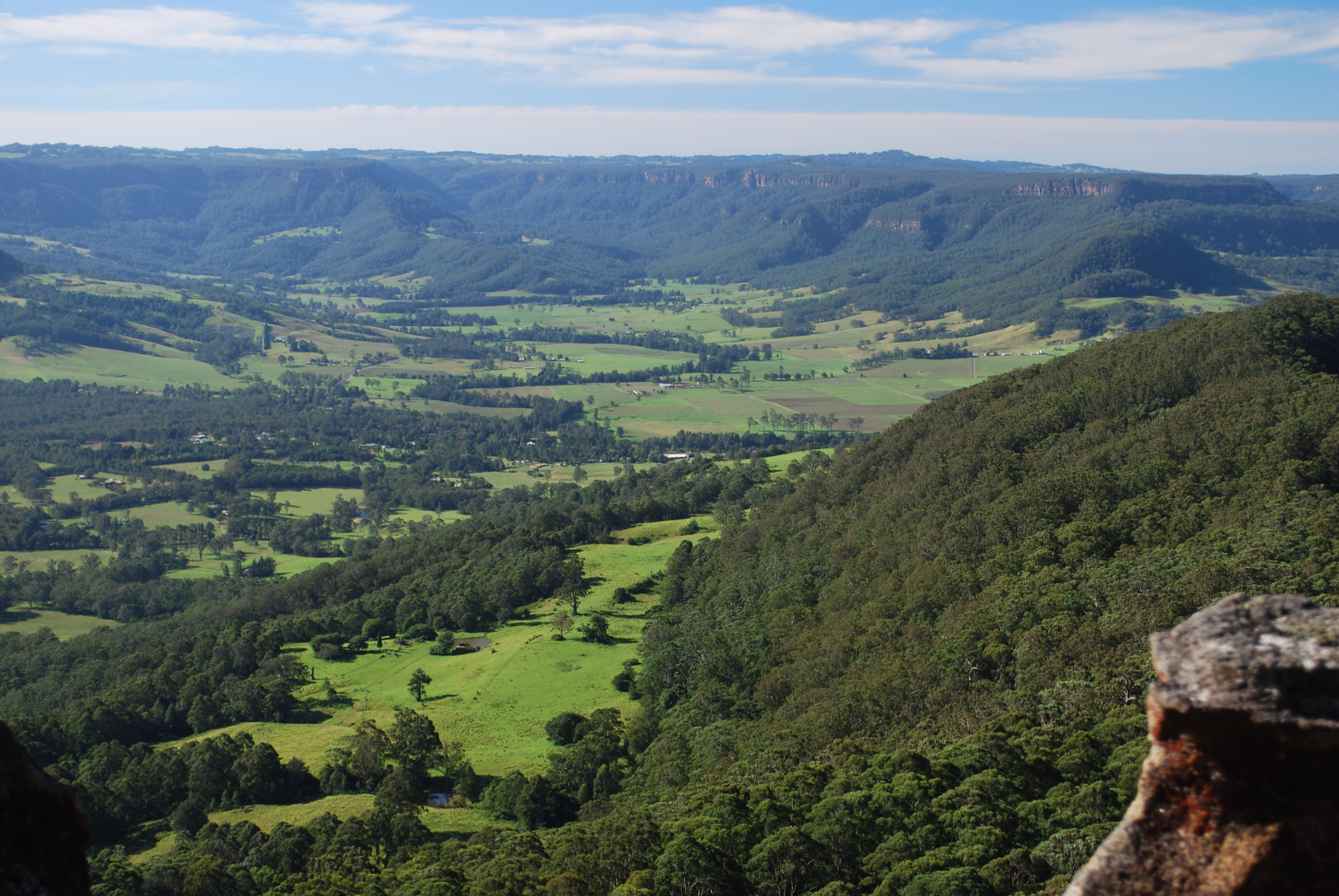
The Southern Highlands

The Great Dividing Range extends from Victoria in the south through New South Wales to Queensland, parallel to the narrow coastal plain. This area includes the Snowy Mountains, the Northern, Central and Southern Tablelands, the Southern Highlands and the South West Slopes. Whilst not particularly steep, many peaks of the range rise above 1,000 metres (3,281 ft), with the highest Mount Kosciuszko at 2,228 m (7,310 ft). Skiing in Australia began in this region at Kiandra around 1861. The relatively short ski season underwrites the tourist industry in the Snowy Mountains. Agriculture, particularly the wool industry, is important throughout the highlands. Major centres include Armidale, Bathurst, Bowral, Goulburn, Inverell, Orange, Queanbeyan and Tamworth.

There are numerous forests in New South Wales, with such tree species as Red Gum Eucalyptus and Crow Ash (Flindersia australis), being represented. Forest floors have a diverse set of understory shrubs and fungi. One of the widespread fungi is Witch's Butter (Tremella mesenterica).

The western slopes and plains fill a significant portion of the state's area and have a much sparser population than areas nearer the coast. Agriculture is central to the economy of the western slopes, particularly the Riverina region and Murrumbidgee Irrigation Area in the state's south-west. Regional cities such as Albury, Dubbo, Griffith and Wagga Wagga and towns such as Deniliquin, Leeton and Parkes exist primarily to service these agricultural regions. The western slopes descend slowly to the western plains that comprise almost two-thirds of the state and are largely arid or semi-arid. The mining town of Broken Hill is the largest centre in this area.

One possible definition of the centre for New South Wales is located 33 kilometres (21 mi) west-north-west of Tottenham.

=== Climate ===
Köppen climate types in New South Wales

A little more than half of the state has an arid to semi-arid climate, where the rainfall averages from 150 to 500 millimetres (5.9 to 19.7 in) a year throughout most of this climate zone. Summer temperatures can be very hot, while winter nights can be quite cold in this region. Rainfall varies throughout the state. The far north-west receives the least, less than 180 mm (7 in) annually, while the east receives between 700 and 1,400 mm (28 and 55 in) of rain.

The climate along the flat, coastal plain east of the range varies from oceanic in the south to humid subtropical in the northern half of the state, right above Wollongong. Rainfall is highest in this area; however, it still varies from around 800 millimetres (31 in) to as high as 3,000 millimetres (120 in) in the wettest areas, for example Dorrigo. In the state's south, on the westward side of the Great Dividing Range, rainfall is heaviest in winter due to cold fronts which move across southern Australia, while in the north, around Lismore, rain is heaviest in summer from tropical systems and occasionally even cyclones. During late winter, the coastal plain is relatively dry due to foehn winds that originate from the Great Dividing Range; the mountain range block the moist, westerly cold fronts that arrive from the Southern Ocean, whereby providing generally clear conditions on the leeward side.

The climate in the southern half of the state is generally warm to hot in summer and cool in the winter. The seasons are more defined in the southern half of the state, especially as one moves inland towards South West Slopes, Central West and the Riverina region. The climate in the northeast region of the state, or the North Coast, bordering Queensland, is hot and humid in the summer and mild in winter. The Northern Tablelands, which are also on the North coast, have relatively mild summers and cold winters, due to their high elevation on the Great Dividing Range.

Peaks along the Great Dividing Range vary from 500 metres (1,640 ft) to over 2,000 metres (6,562 ft) above sea level. Temperatures can be cool to cold in winter with frequent frosts and snowfall, and are rarely hot in summer due to the elevation. Lithgow has a climate typical of the range, as do the regional cities of Orange, Cooma, Oberon and Armidale. Such places fall within the subtropical highland (Cwb) variety. Rainfall is moderate in this area, ranging from 600 to 800 mm (24 to 31 in).

Snowfall is common in the higher parts of the range, sometimes occurring as far north as the Queensland border. On the highest peaks of the Snowy Mountains, the climate can be subpolar oceanic and even alpine on the higher peaks with very cold temperatures and heavy snow. The Blue Mountains, Southern Tablelands and Central Tablelands, which are situated on the Great Dividing Range, have mild to warm summers and cold winters, although not as severe as those in the Snowy Mountains.

The highest maximum temperature recorded was 49.7 °C (121 °F) at Menindee in the west of the state on 10 January 1939. The lowest minimum temperature was −23 °C (−9 °F) at Charlotte Pass in the Snowy Mountains on 29 June 1994. This is also the lowest temperature recorded in the whole of Australia excluding the Antarctic Territory.

Climate data for New South Wales
| Month | Jan | Feb | Mar | Apr | May | Jun | Jul | Aug | Sep | Oct | Nov | Dec | Year |
|---|---|---|---|---|---|---|---|---|---|---|---|---|---|
| Record high °C (°F) | 49.7 (121.5) | 48.5 (119.3) | 45.0 (113.0) | 40.0 (104.0) | 34.4 (93.9) | 31.0 (87.8) | 31.7 (89.1) | 37.8 (100.0) | 39.6 (103.3) | 43.9 (111.0) | 46.8 (116.2) | 48.9 (120.0) | 49.7 (121.5) |
| Record low °C (°F) | −5.6 (21.9) | −7.0 (19.4) | −7.2 (19.0) | −13.0 (8.6) | −13.4 (7.9) | −23.0 (−9.4) | −19.6 (−3.3) | −20.6 (−5.1) | −16.7 (1.9) | −12.0 (10.4) | −9.4 (15.1) | −7.0 (19.4) | −23.0 (−9.4) |
Source: Bureau of Meteorology

== Demographics ==
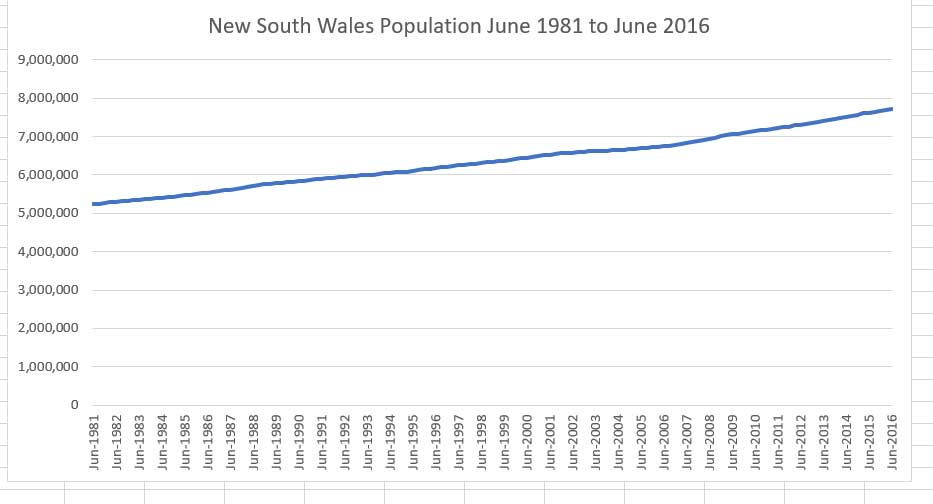
The estimated resident population since 1981

As of September 2025, the estimated population of New South Wales was 8,600,500 people, representing approximately 30% of the nationwide population. Sydney was home to almost two-thirds of the NSW population.

=== Cities and towns ===
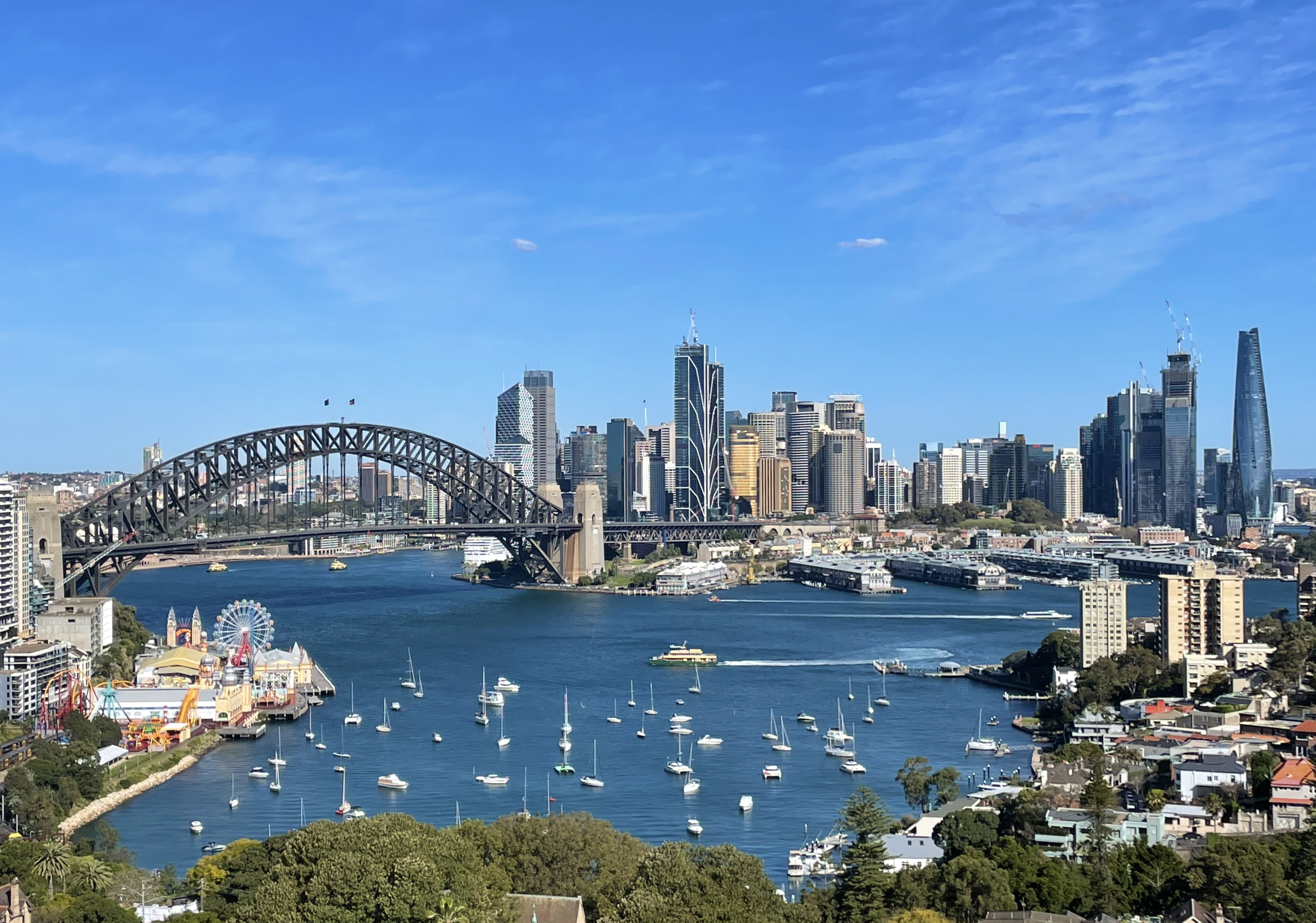
Sydney is Australia's most populous city.

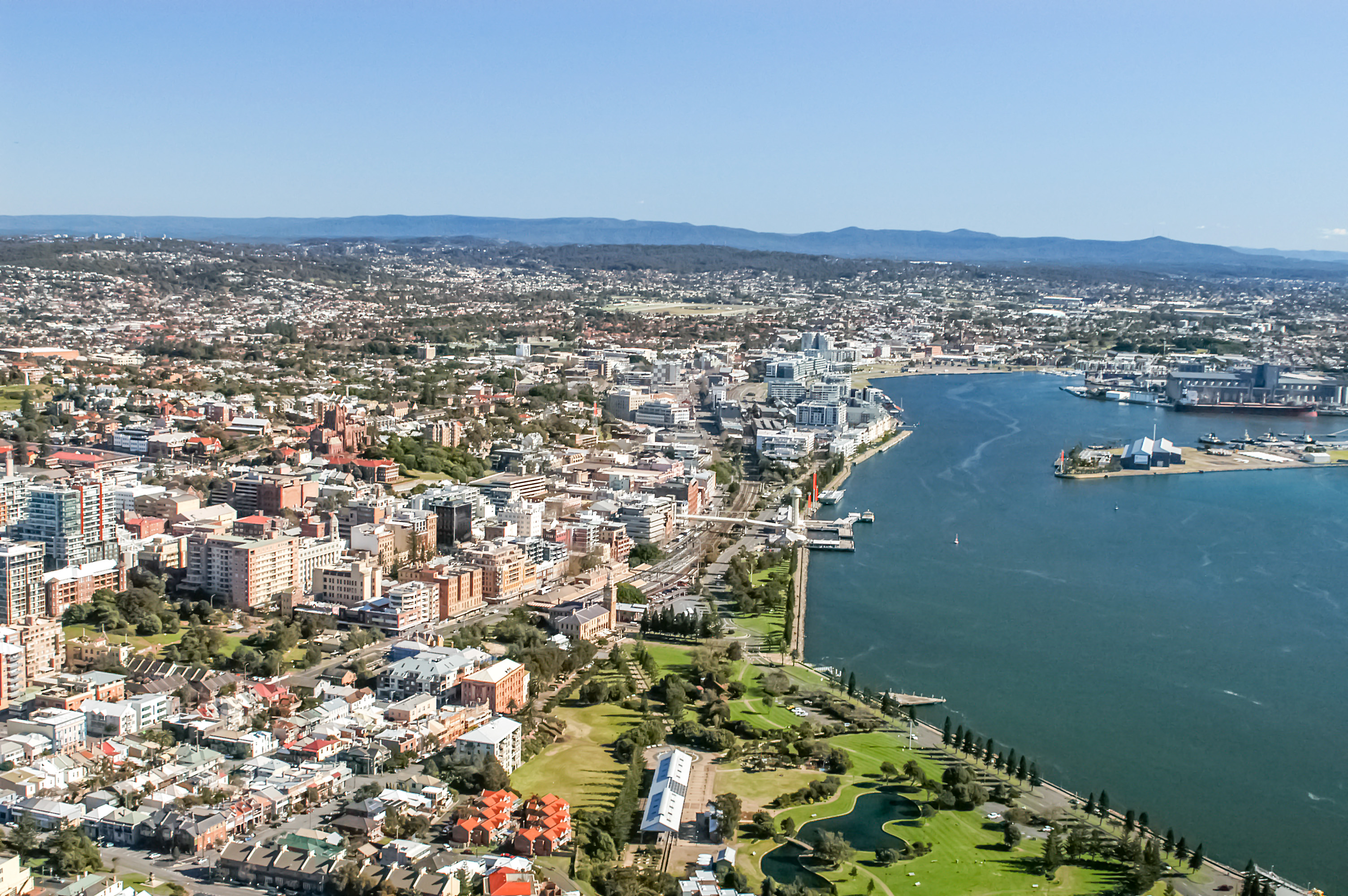
Newcastle

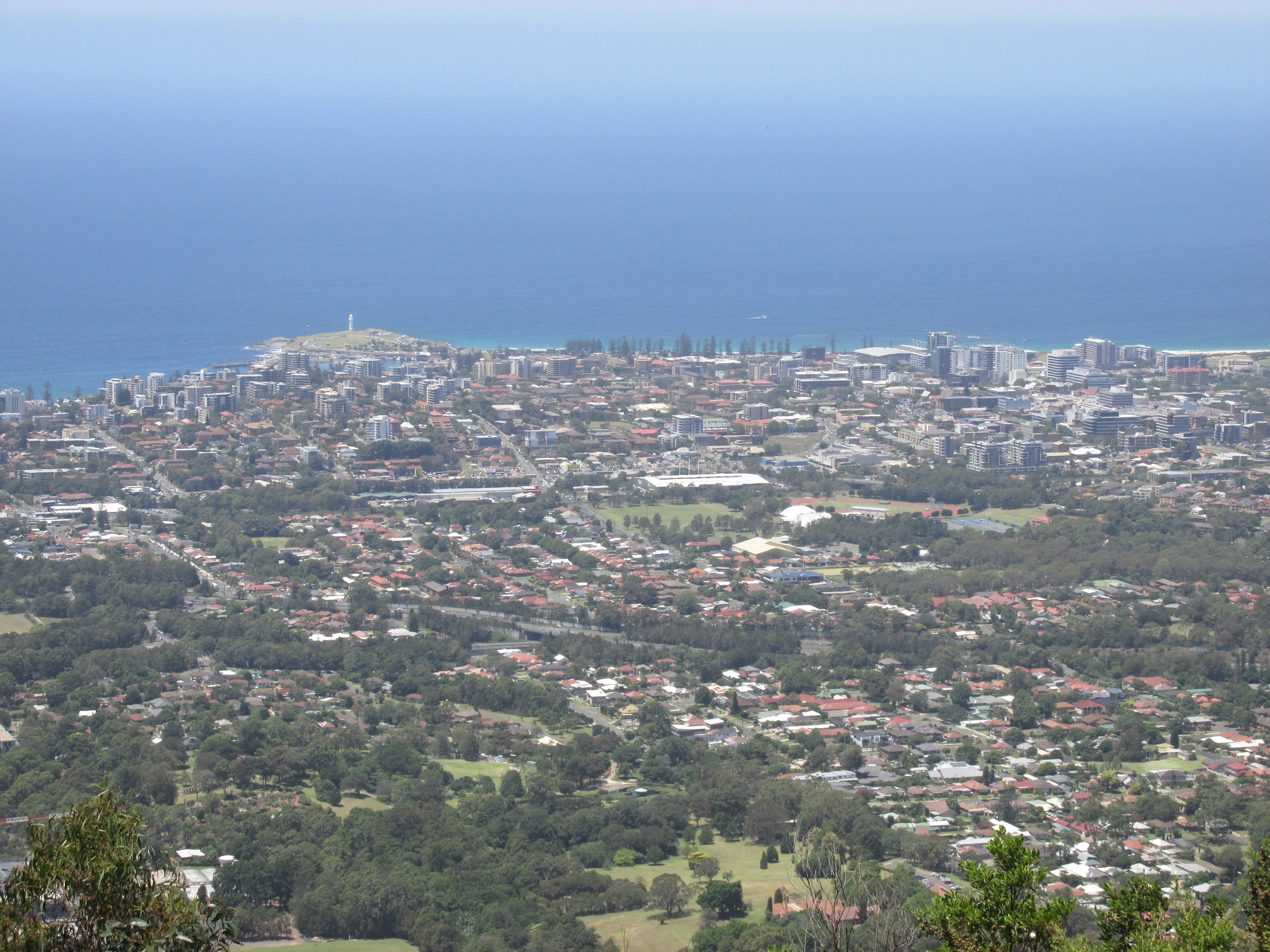
Wollongong

Population by Statistical Area Level 4 and 3
| NSW rank | Statistical Area Level 2 | Population (30 June 2014) | 10-year growth rate | Population density (people/km^{2}) |
|---|---|---|---|---|
| 1 | Greater Sydney | 4,940,628 | 15.7 | 397.4 |
| 2 | Newcastle and Lake Macquarie | 368,131 | 9.0 | 423.1 |
| 3 | Illawarra | 296,845 | 9.3 | 192.9 |
| 4 | Hunter Valley excluding Newcastle | 264,087 | 16.2 | 12.3 |
| 5 | Richmond Tweed | 242,116 | 8.9 | 23.6 |
| 6 | Capital region | 220,944 | 10.9 | 4.3 |
| 7 | Mid North Coast | 212,787 | 9.2 | 11.3 |
| 8 | Central West | 209,850 | 7.9 | 3.0 |
| 9 | New England and North West | 186,262 | 5.3 | 1.9 |
| 10 | Riverina | 158,144 | 4.7 | 2.8 |
| 11 | Southern Highlands and Shoalhaven | 146,388 | 10.4 | 21.8 |
| 12 | Coffs Harbour-Grafton | 136,418 | 7.6 | 10.3 |
| 13 | Far West and Orana | 119,742 | 0.3 | 0.4 |
| 14 | Murray | 116,130 | 4.0 | 1.2 |
| | New South Wales | 7,518,472 | 10.4 | 13.0 |

Population by Significant Urban Area
| NSW rank | Significant Urban Area | Population (30 June 2018/2021 Census) | Australia rank | 10-year growth rate |
|---|---|---|---|---|
| 1 | Sydney | 4,835,206 | 1 | 19.3 |
| – | Gold Coast – Tweed Heads | 654,073 | 6 | – |
| 2 | Newcastle – Maitland | 505,489 | 7 | 11.3 |
| 3 | Gosford (Central Coast) | 338,567 | 9 | 19.5 |
| 4 | Wollongong | 312,167 | 11 | 11.2 |
| – | Albury-Wodonga | 97,274 | 20 | 14.9 |
| 5 | Coffs Harbour | 71,822 | 25 | 11.8 |
| 6 | Wagga Wagga | 67,609 | 28 | 6.7 |
| 7 | Albury | 56,093 | 30 | 14.9 |
| 8 | Port Macquarie | 47,973 | 33 | 15.6 |
| 9 | Tamworth | 42,872 | 34 | 10.9 |
| 10 | Orange | 40,493 | 36 | 12.9 |
| 11 | Bowral – Mittagong | 39,887 | 37 | 13.5 |
| 12 | Dubbo | 38,392 | 39 | 12.2 |
| 13 | Nowra – Bomaderry | 37,420 | 42 | 14 |
| 14 | Bathurst | 33,801 | 43 | 15.0 |
| 15 | Lismore | 28,720 | 49 | −0.9 |
| 16 | Nelson Bay | 28,051 | 50 | 13.2 |
| 17 | Tweed Heads-Tweed Heads South | | | |
| 18 | Taree | 26,448 | 55 | 2.3 |
| 19 | Ballina | 26,381 | 55 | 10.1 |
| 20 | Morisset – Cooranbong | 25,309 | 57 | 15.1 |
| 21 | Armidale | 24,504 | 58 | 7.0 |
| 22 | Goulburn | 23,835 | 59 | 12 |
| 23 | Forster – Tuncurry | 21,159 | 65 | 7.3 |
| 24 | Griffith | 20,251 | 66 | 11.5 |
| 25 | St Georges Basin – Sanctuary Point | 19,251 | 68 | 19.1 |
| 26 | Grafton | 19,078 | 69 | 3.5 |
| 27 | Camden Haven | 17,835 | 73 | 12.4 |
| 28 | Broken Hill | 17,734 | 74 | −9.5 |
| 29 | Batemans Bay | 16,485 | 78 | 4.4 |
| 30 | Singleton | 16,346 | 79 | −0.6 |
| 31 | Ulladulla | 16,213 | 81 | 11.8 |
| 32 | Kempsey | 15,309 | 84 | 5.8 |
| 33 | Lithgow | 12,973 | 93 | 4.8 |
| 34 | Mudgee | 12,410 | 95 | 21.5 |
| 35 | Muswellbrook | 12,364 | 96 | 5.0 |
| 36 | Parkes | 11,224 | 98 | 2.1 |
| New South Wales | | 7,480,228 | —N/a | 17.6 |

=== Ancestry and immigration ===
Country of Birth (2021) (Note: Only the top 12 most common birthplaces are listed in this table.)
| Birthplace (Note: In accordance with the Australian Bureau of Statistics source, England, Scotland, Mainland China and the Special Administrative Regions of Hong Kong and Macau are listed separately.) | Population |
|---|---|
| Australia (Note: Does not include Norfolk Island or other Australian External Territories.) | 5,277,497 |
| China | 247,595 |
| England | 231,385 |
| India | 208,962 |
| New Zealand | 118,527 |
| Philippines | 106,930 |
| Vietnam | 97,995 |
| Nepal | 64,946 |
| Lebanon | 63,293 |
| Iraq | 55,353 |
| South Korea | 53,046 |
| South Africa | 42,347 |

At the 2021 census, the most commonly nominated ancestries were: (Note: The percentages include those who did not answer the question or who gave an unclear answer.)

- English (29.8%)
- Australian (28.6%) (Note: The Australian Bureau of Statistics has stated that most who nominate "Australian" as their ancestry are part of the Anglo-Celtic group.)
- Irish (9.1%)
- Scottish (7.7%)
- Chinese (7.2%)
- Italian (3.7%)
- Indian (3.2%)
- Indigenous (3.0%) (Note: Includes those identifying as having Aboriginal Australians or Torres Strait Islanders ancestry. Indigenous identification is separate from the ancestry question on the Australian Census and persons identifying as Aboriginal or Torres Strait Islander may identify any ancestry.)
- German (3.0%)
- Lebanese (2.2%)
- Filipino (1.9%)
- Greek (1.8%)
- Vietnamese (1.5%)
- Dutch (1.1%)
- Maltese (1.0%)

At the 2021 census, 2,794,666 people were living in New South Wales who were born overseas, accounting for 34.6% of the population. Only 43.7% of the population had both parents born in Australia. (Note: 6.0% of people did not state where their parents were born.)

3.4% of the population, or 278,043 people, identified as Indigenous Australians (Aboriginal Australians and Torres Strait Islanders) in 2021. (Note: Of any ancestry. Includes those identifying as Aboriginal Australians or Torres Strait Islanders. Indigenous identification is separate from the ancestry question on the Australian Census and persons identifying as Aboriginal or Torres Strait Islander may identify any ancestry.)

=== Language ===
According to the 2021 census, 29.5% of people in New South Wales speak a language other than English at home with Mandarin (3.4%), Arabic (2.8%), Cantonese (1.8%), Vietnamese (1.5%) and Hindi (1.0%) being the most popular.

=== Religion ===
Religious Affiliations in New South Wales (2021 Census)
1. Christianity (47.6%)
2. No Religious Affiliation (33.2%)
3. Islam (4.30%)
4. Hinduism (3.40%)
5. Buddhism (2.80%)
6. Others (8.70%)

In the 2021 census, Christianity was the primary religious affiliation in New South Wales (NSW), comprising 47.6% of the population, mostly Roman Catholicism (22.4%) and Anglicanism (11.9%). This percentage has declined over time, while the number of people identifying with no religious affiliation has risen. In 2016, the Christian affiliation rate was 55.2%, and in 1971 it was 88.4%. About 33.2% of people in NSW reported having no religious affiliation in 2021.

About 12.1% of the population in 2021 identified with a non-Christian religion, with Islam (4.3%), Hinduism (3.4%), and Buddhism (2.8%) being the most common.

== Government ==
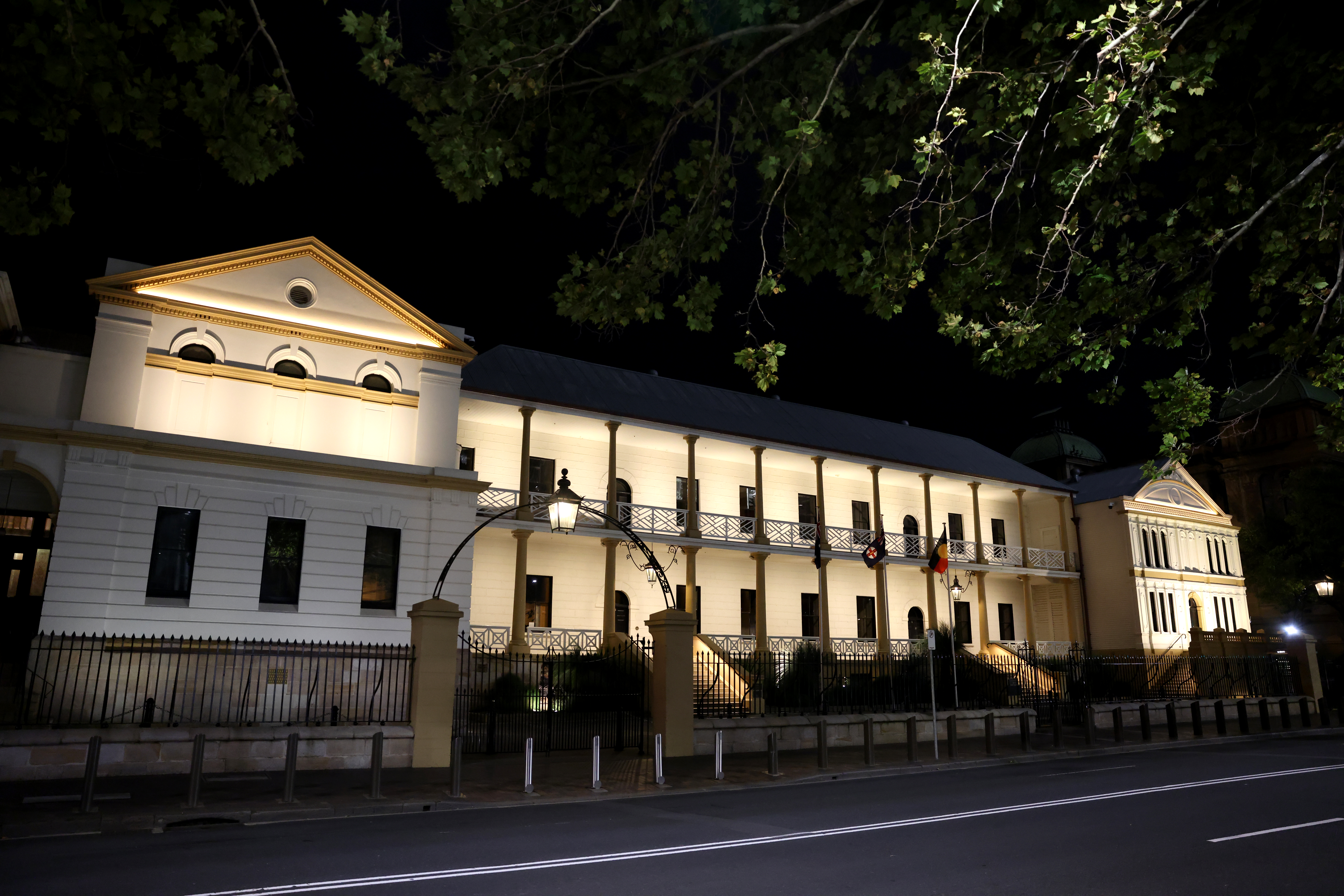
New South Wales Parliament House in Sydney, the oldest public building in Australia

Executive power is formally exercised by the Executive Council, which consists of the Governor and senior ministers. The current governor is Margaret Beazley. The governor commissions as premier the leader of the parliamentary political party that can command a simple majority of votes in the Legislative Assembly. The premier then recommends the appointment of other members of the two Houses to the Ministry, under the principle of responsible or Westminster government. As in other Westminster systems, there is no constitutional requirement in New South Wales for the government to be formed from the parliament, merely a convention. As of early July 2023, the premier is Chris Minns of the Labor Party.

=== Constitution ===
The form of the Government of New South Wales is prescribed in its Constitution, dating from 1856 and currently the Constitution Act 1902 (NSW). Since 1901 New South Wales has been a state of the Commonwealth of Australia, and the Australian Constitution regulates its relationship with the Commonwealth.

In 2006, the Constitution Amendment Pledge of Loyalty Act 2006 No 6, was enacted to amend the NSW Constitution Act 1902 to require Members of the New South Wales Parliament and its Ministers to take a pledge of loyalty to Australia and to the people of New South Wales instead of swearing allegiance to Elizabeth II her heirs and successors, and to revise the oaths taken by Executive Councillors. The Pledge of Loyalty Act was officially assented to by the Queen on 3 April 2006. The option to swear allegiance to the Queen was restored as an alternative option in June 2012.

Under the Australian Constitution, New South Wales ceded certain legislative and judicial powers to the Commonwealth, but retained independence in all other areas. The New South Wales Constitution says: "The Legislature shall, subject to the provisions of the Commonwealth of Australia Constitution Act, have power to make laws for the peace, welfare, and good government of New South Wales in all cases whatsoever".

=== Parliament ===
The first responsible self-government of New South Wales was formed on 6 June 1856 with Sir Stuart Alexander Donaldson appointed by Governor Sir William Denison as its first Colonial Secretary which in those days accounted also as the premier. The Parliament of New South Wales is composed of the Sovereign and two houses: the Legislative Assembly (lower house), and the Legislative Council (upper house). Elections are held every four years on the fourth Saturday of March, the most recent being on 25 March 2023. At each election one member is elected to the Legislative Assembly from each of 93 electoral districts and half of the 42 members of the Legislative Council are elected by a statewide electorate.

=== Local government ===
New South Wales is divided into 128 local government areas. There is also the Unincorporated Far West Region which is not part of any local government area, in the sparsely inhabited Far West, and Lord Howe Island, which is also unincorporated but self-governed by the Lord Howe Island Board.

=== Emergency services ===
New South Wales is policed by the New South Wales Police Force, a statutory authority. Established in 1862, the New South Wales Police Force investigates Summary and Indictable offences throughout the State of New South Wales. The state has two fire services: the volunteer-based New South Wales Rural Fire Service, which is responsible for the majority of the state, and the Fire and Rescue NSW, a government agency responsible for protecting urban areas. There is some overlap due to suburbanisation. Ambulance services are provided through the New South Wales Ambulance. Rescue services (i.e., vertical, road crash, confinement) are a joint effort by all emergency services, with Ambulance Rescue, Police Rescue Squad and Fire Rescue Units contributing. Volunteer rescue organisations include Marine Rescue New South Wales, State Emergency Service (SES), Surf Life Saving NSW and Volunteer Rescue Association (VRA).

== Education ==
=== Primary and secondary ===
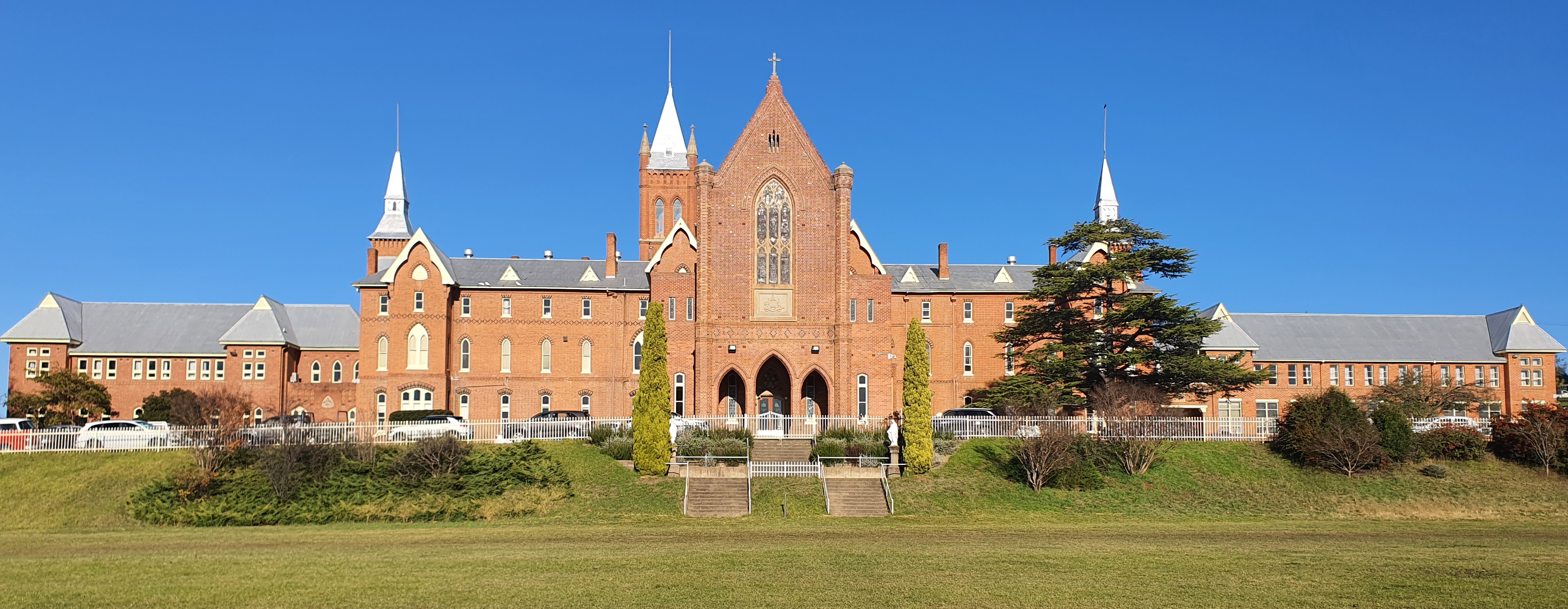
St Stanislaus' College is a secondary day and boarding school in Bathurst

The NSW school system comprises a kindergarten to year 12 system with primary schooling up to year 6 and secondary schooling between years 7 and 12. Schooling is compulsory from before 6 years old until the age of 17 (unless Year 10 is completed earlier). Between 1943 and 2009, schooling was only compulsory in NSW until age 15.

Primary and secondary schools include government and non-government schools. Government schools are further classified as comprehensive and selective schools. Non-government schools include Catholic schools, other denominational schools, and non-denominational independent schools.

Typically, a primary school provides education from kindergarten level to year 6. A secondary school, usually called a "high school", provides education from years 7 to 12.

The NSW Education Standards Authority classifies the 13 years of primary and secondary schooling into six stages, beginning with Early Stage 1 (Kindergarten) and ending with Stage 6 (years 11 and 12).

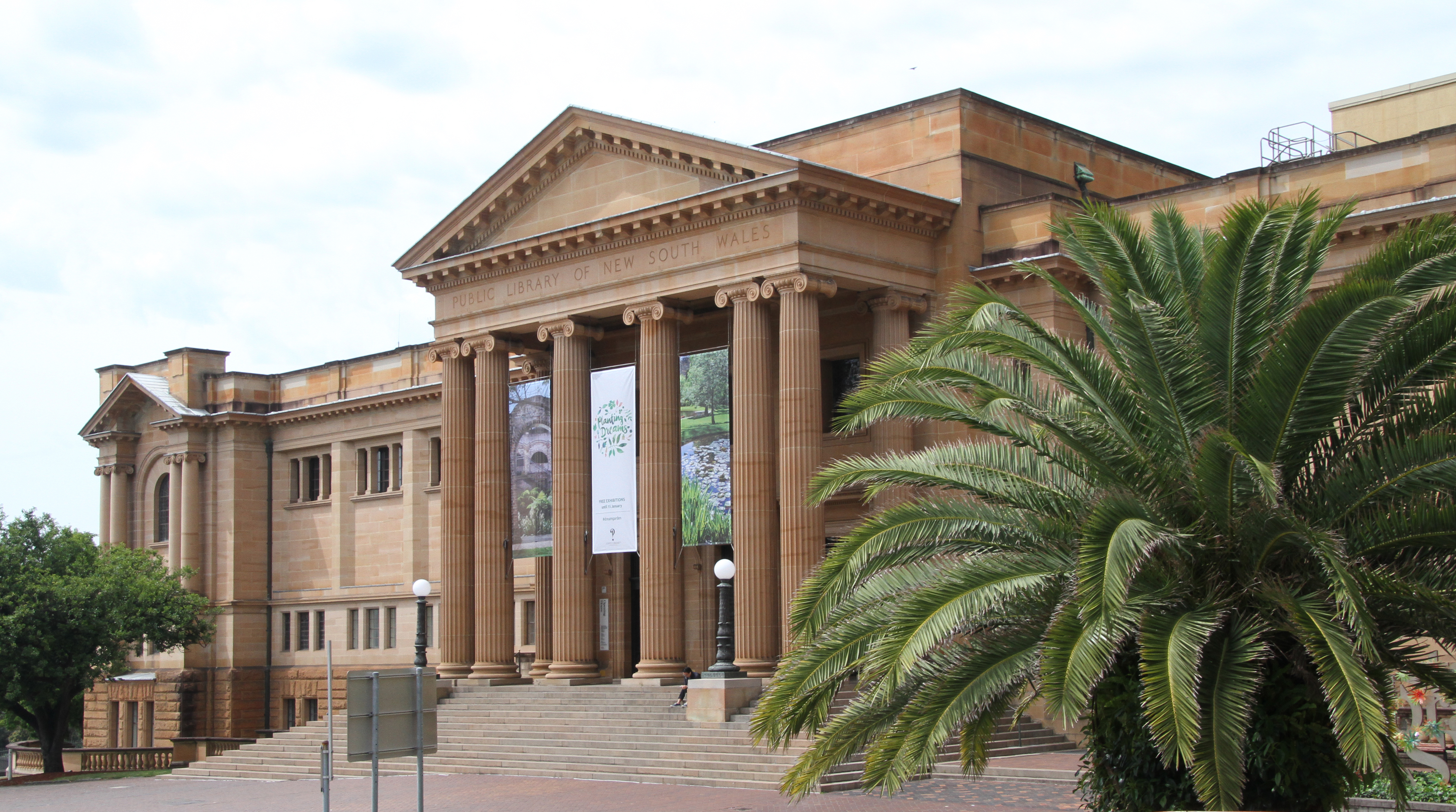
The State Library of New South Wales

==== Record of School Achievement ====
A Record of School Achievement (RoSA) is awarded by the NSW Education Standards Authority to students who have completed at least Year 10 but leave school without completing the Higher School Certificate. The RoSA was introduced in 2012 to replace the former School Certificate.

==== Higher School Certificate ====
The Higher School Certificate (HSC) is the usual Year 12 leaving certificate in NSW. The HSC is the most popular high school credential in Australia with 75,493 students studying one or more HSC courses in 2022. Most students complete the HSC before entering the workforce or going on to study at university or TAFE (although the HSC itself can be completed at TAFE). The HSC must be completed for a student to get an Australian Tertiary Admission Rank (formerly Universities Admission Index), which determines the student's rank against fellow students who completed the Higher School Certificate.

=== Tertiary ===
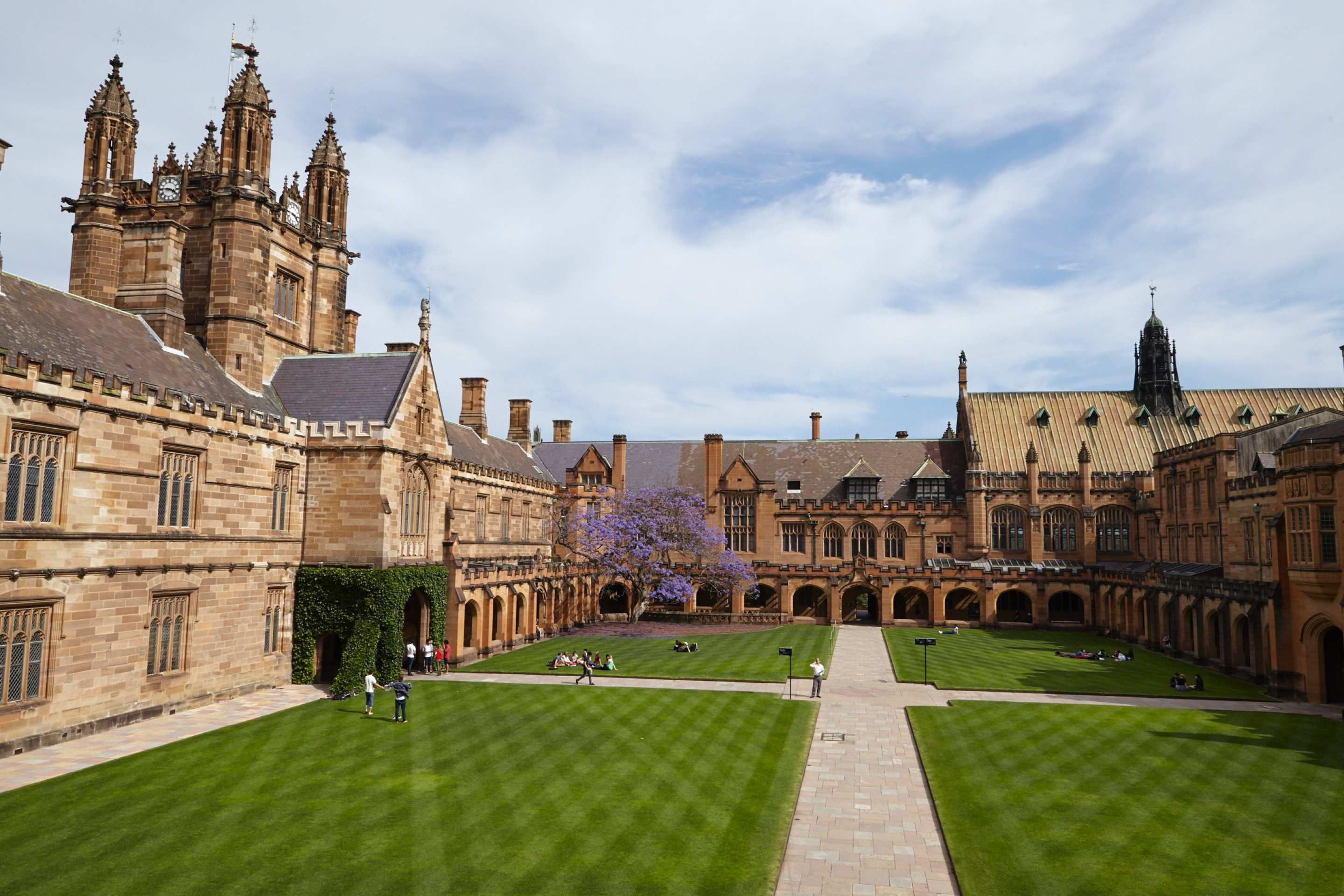
The University of Sydney is Australia's oldest university.

Eleven universities primarily operate in New South Wales. Sydney is home to Australia's first university, the University of Sydney founded in 1850. Other universities include the University of New South Wales, Macquarie University, University of Technology Sydney and Western Sydney University. The Australian Catholic University has three of its seven campuses in Sydney, and the private University of Notre Dame Australia also operates a secondary campus in the city.

Outside Sydney, the leading universities are the University of Newcastle and the University of Wollongong. Armidale is home to the University of New England, and Charles Sturt University. Southern Cross University has campuses spread across cities in the state's north coast.

The public universities are state government agencies; however, they are largely regulated by the federal government, which also administers their public funding. Admission to NSW universities is arranged together with universities in the Australian Capital Territory by another organisation, the Universities Admission Centre.

Primarily, vocational training up to the level of advanced diplomas is provided by the state government's ten Technical and Further Education (TAFE) institutes. These institutes run courses on 138 campuses throughout the state.

== Economy ==
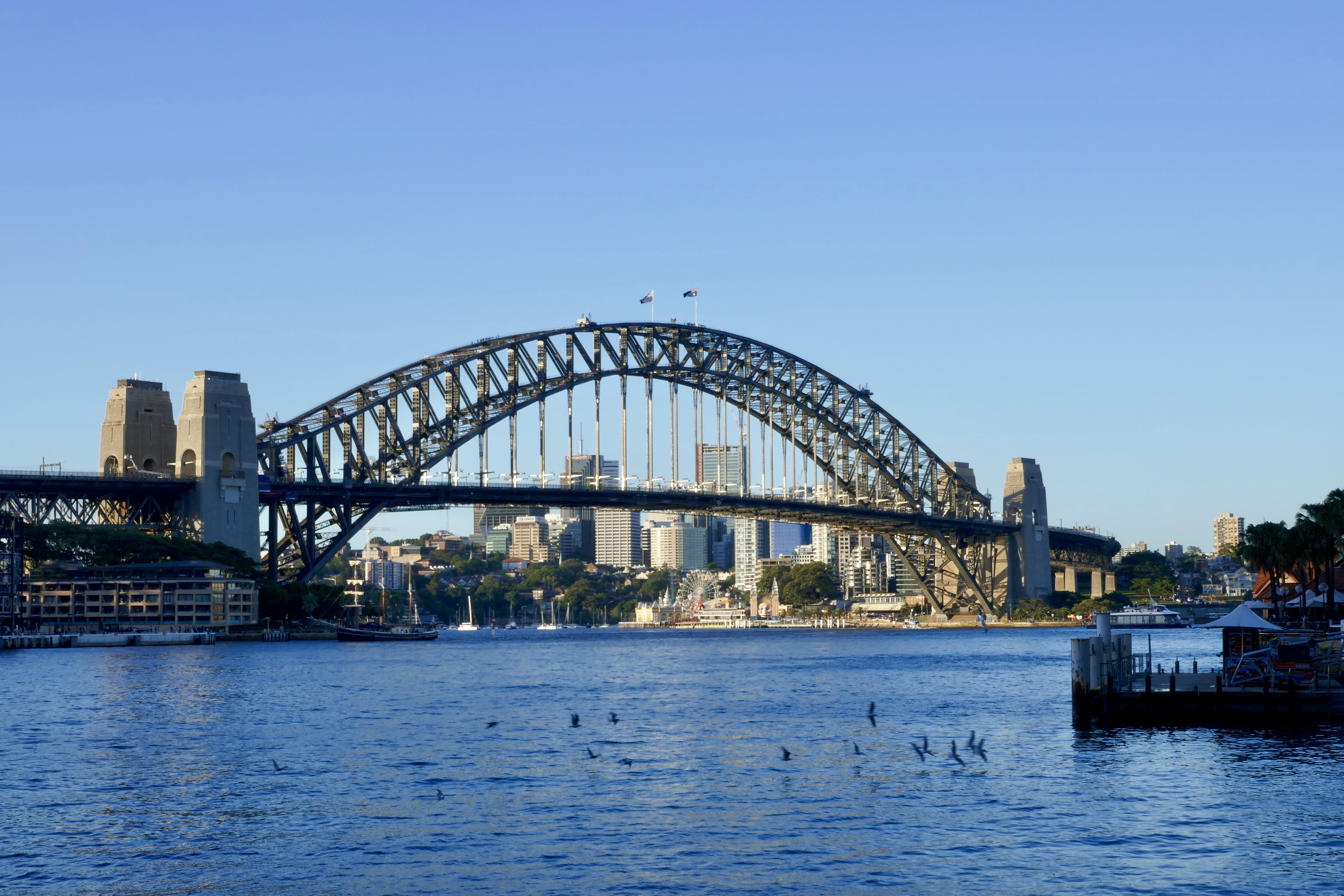
The Sydney Harbour Bridge is an important tourist attraction for New South Wales.

NSW is the largest state economy in Australia, with service industries contributing almost 80% of the state's economic activity and 90% of its employment. Business services, which include financial services, professional, scientific and technical services, property services, information media, and telecommunications, account for nearly a third of the state economy. Major merchandise exports include coal, copper, beef and aluminium. In recent years, there has been strong growth in exports of education, tourism, and financial and business services.

Construction accounted for 8% of the NSW economy in 2020–21, while manufacturing contributed 6%, mining 2%, and agriculture, forestry and fishing just under 2%.

Coal and related products are the state's biggest merchandise export. Its value to the state's economy is over A$5 billion, accounting for about 19% of all merchandise exports from NSW. Tourism is worth over $18.1 billion to the New South Wales economy and employs 3.1% of the workforce.

=== Agriculture ===
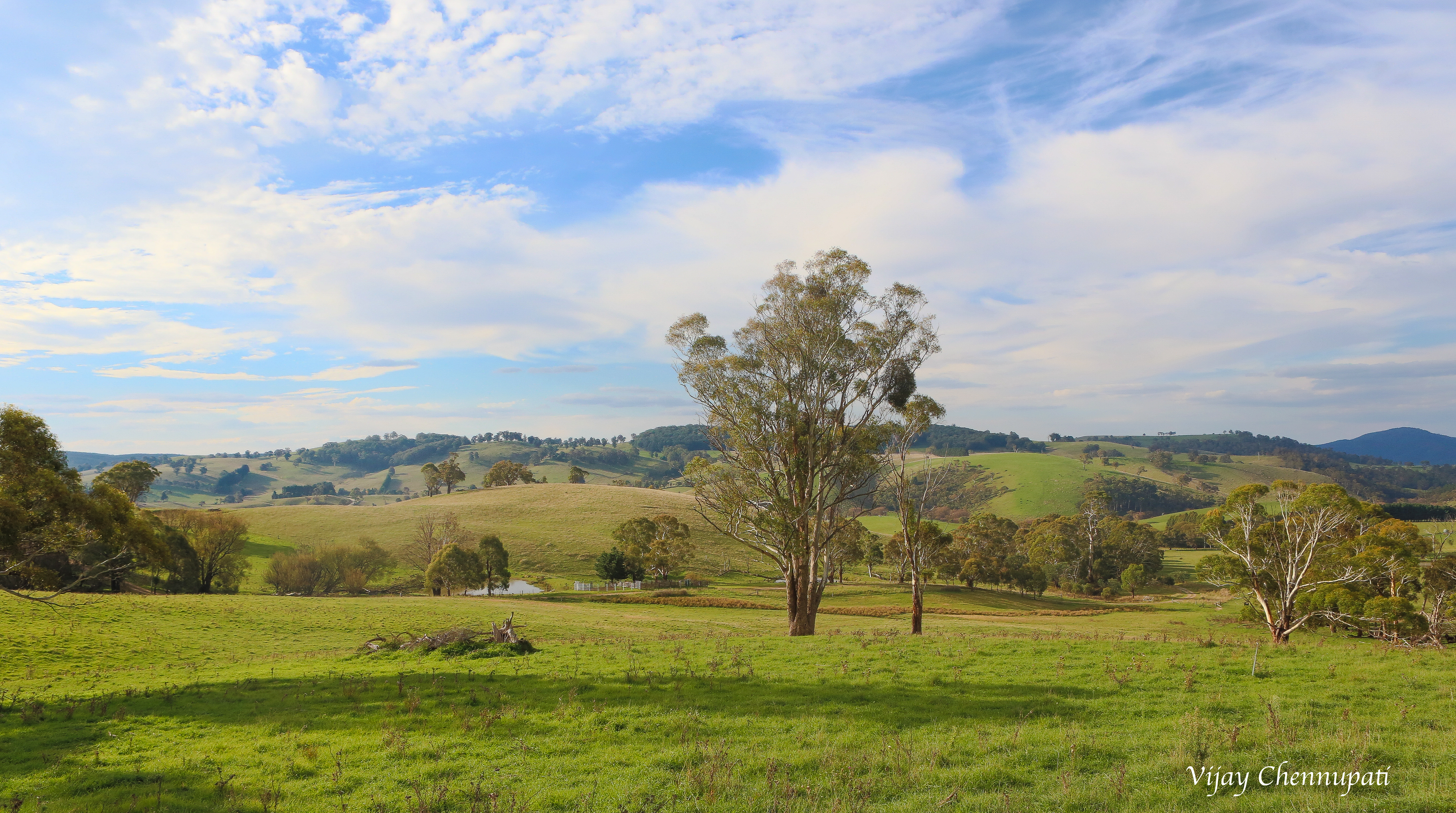
Grazing fields in Oberon

Agriculture accounts for just under 2% of the NSW economy. NSW has the second-highest value of agricultural production of the Australian states. Wheat is the most extensive crop in the state by hectare amounting to 39% of the continent's harvest. The most important wheat-growing areas are the Central West, Orana, New England, North-West and Riverina.

Barley, cotton and canola are also important broadacre crops. Most cotton production is in the New England, Orana, North West, and Far West regions. However, the southern regions of the state now produce almost one-third of the state's crop by value.

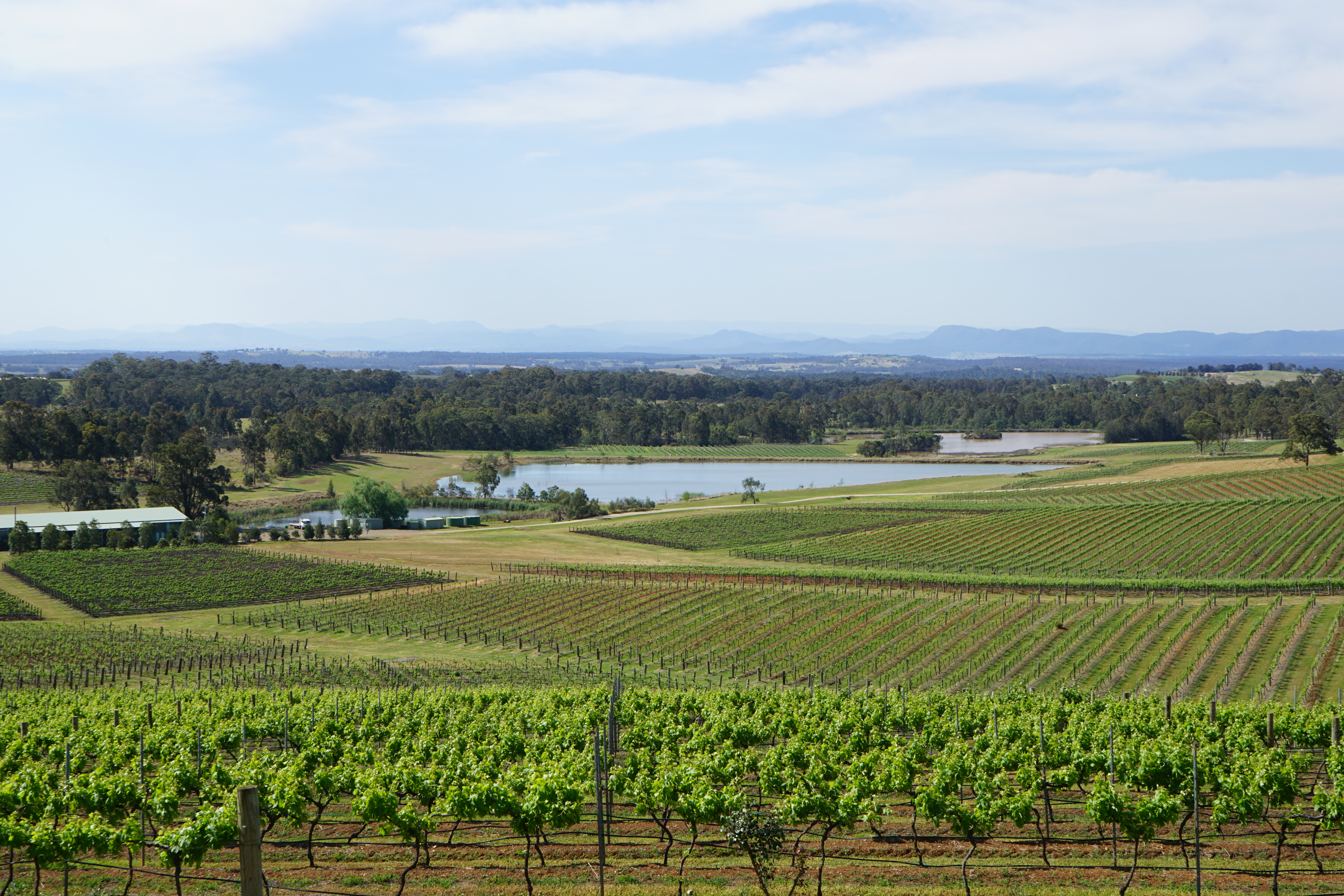
Vineyards in the Hunter Valley wine region

NSW produces about 20% of Australia's fruit and nuts, and about 12% of its vegetables by value. The major regions for fruit and nut production are the Riverina, Coffs Harbour-Grafton and the Murray. About 40,200 hectares (99,000 acres) of vineyards lie across the eastern region of the state, with the Hunter Valley and the Riverina being major wine producing regions.

Cattle, sheep and pigs are the predominant livestock of NSW. The state has over one-third of the country's sheep, and one-fifth of its cattle and pigs. Australia's largest and most valuable Thoroughbred horse breeding area is centred on Scone in the Hunter Valley.

== Transport ==
Passage through New South Wales is vital for cross-continent transport. Rail and road traffic from Brisbane (Queensland) to Perth (Western Australia), or to Melbourne (Victoria) must pass through New South Wales.

=== Railways ===
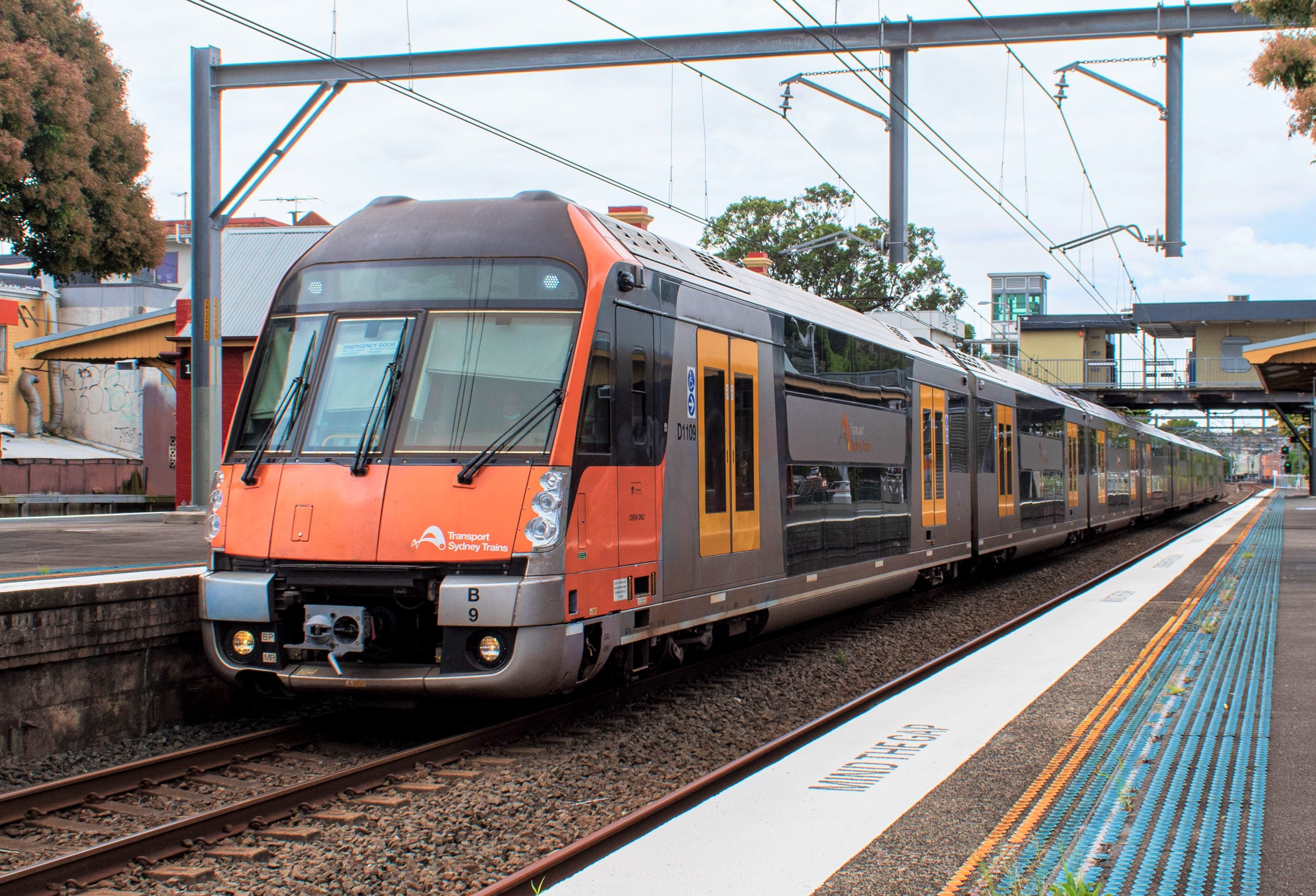
A Sydney B set suburban train at Carlton

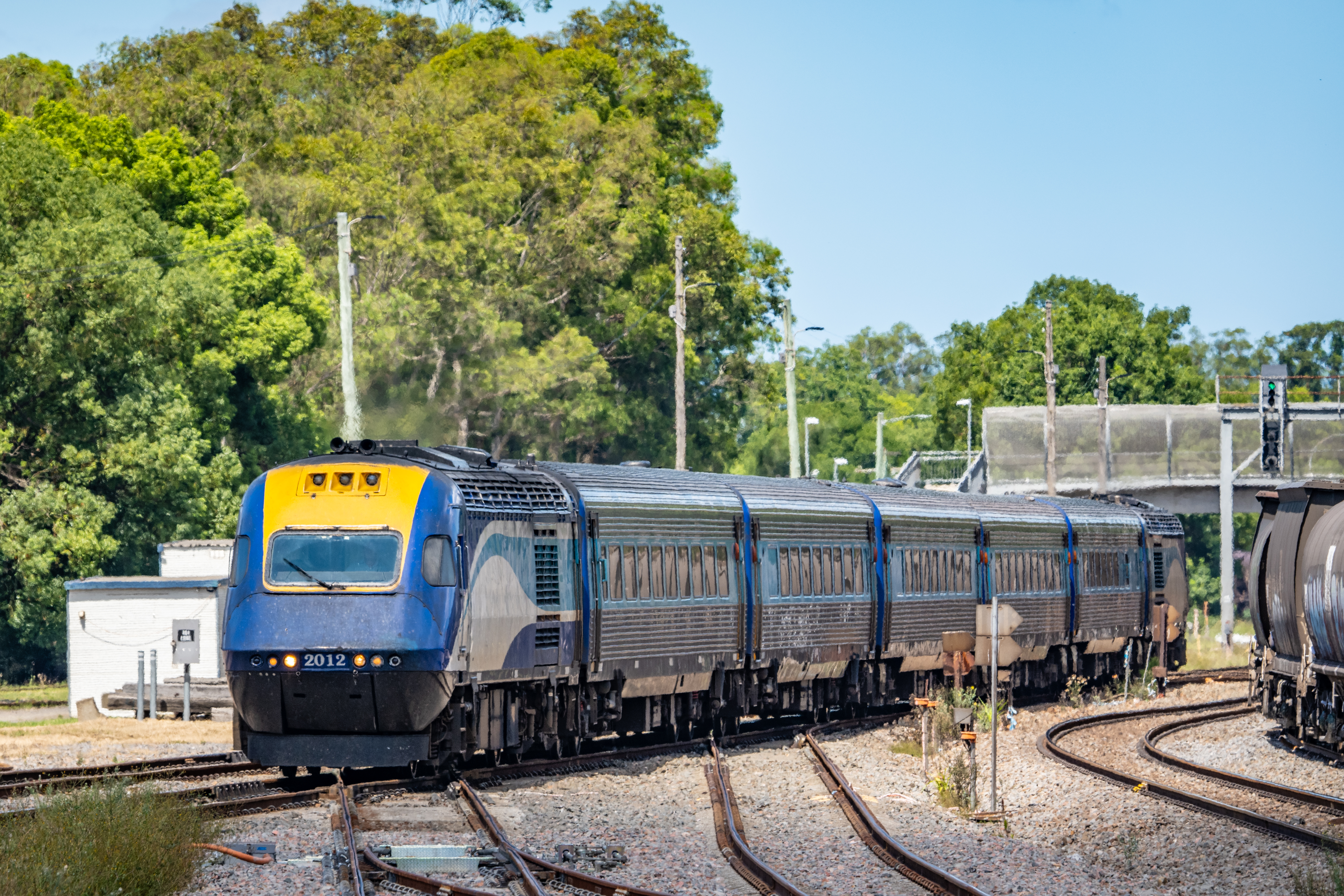
An XPT on the Main North line in Maitland

The majority of railways in New South Wales are currently operated by the state government. Some lines began as branch lines of railways starting in other states. For instance, Balranald near the Victorian border was connected by a rail line coming up from Victoria and into New South Wales. Another line beginning in Adelaide crossed over the border and stopped at Broken Hill.

Railways management are conducted by Sydney Trains and NSW TrainLink which maintain rolling stock. Sydney Trains operates trains within Sydney while NSW TrainLink operates outside Sydney, intercity, country and interstate services.

Both Sydney Trains and NSW TrainLink have their main terminus at Sydney's Central station. NSW TrainLink regional and long-distance services consist of XPT services to Grafton, Casino, Brisbane, Melbourne and Dubbo, as well as Xplorer services to Canberra, Griffith, Broken Hill, Armidale and Moree. NSW TrainLink intercity trains operate on the Blue Mountains Line, Central Coast & Newcastle Line, South Coast Line, Southern Highlands Line and Hunter Line.

=== Roads ===
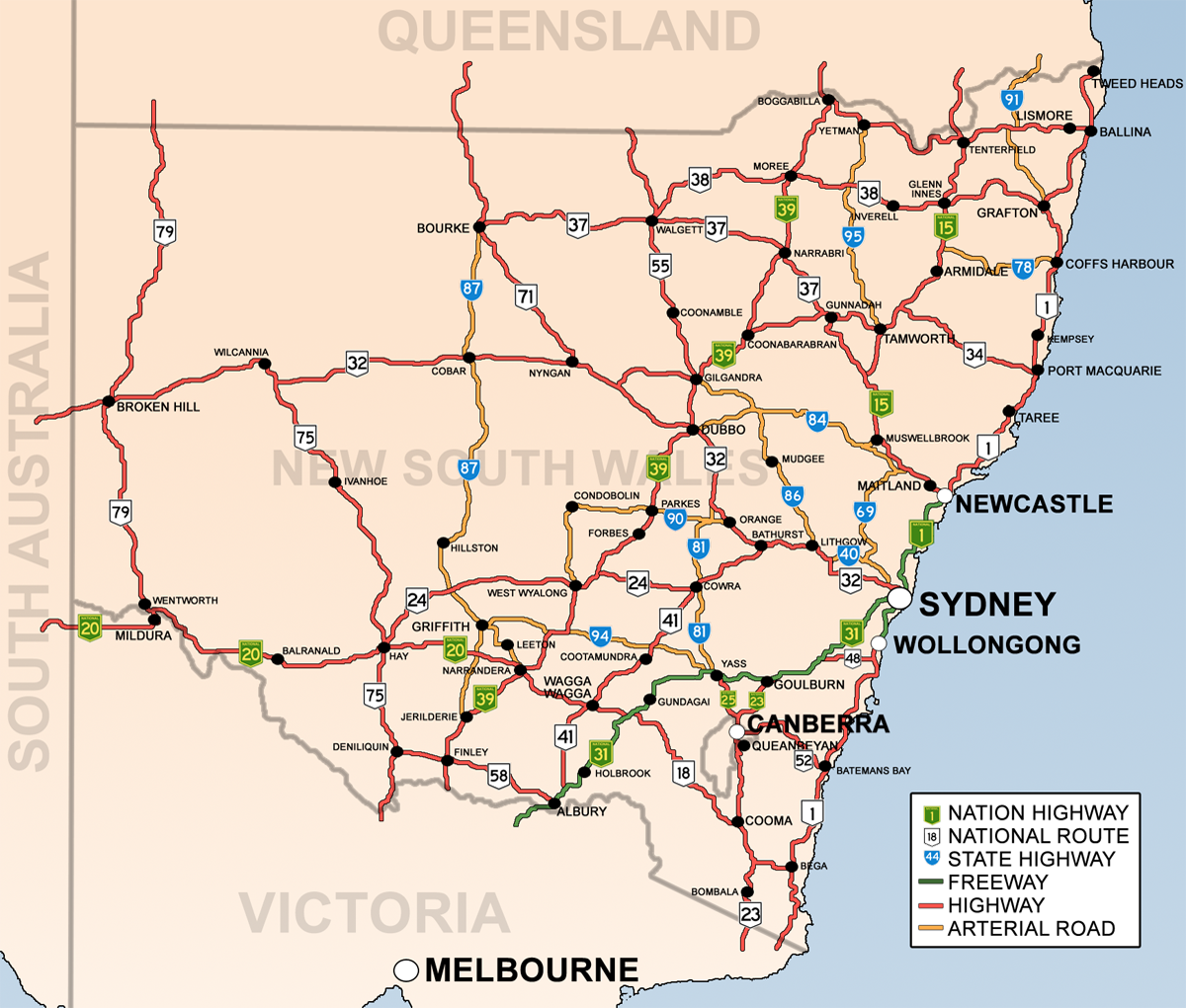
New South Wales and its highways

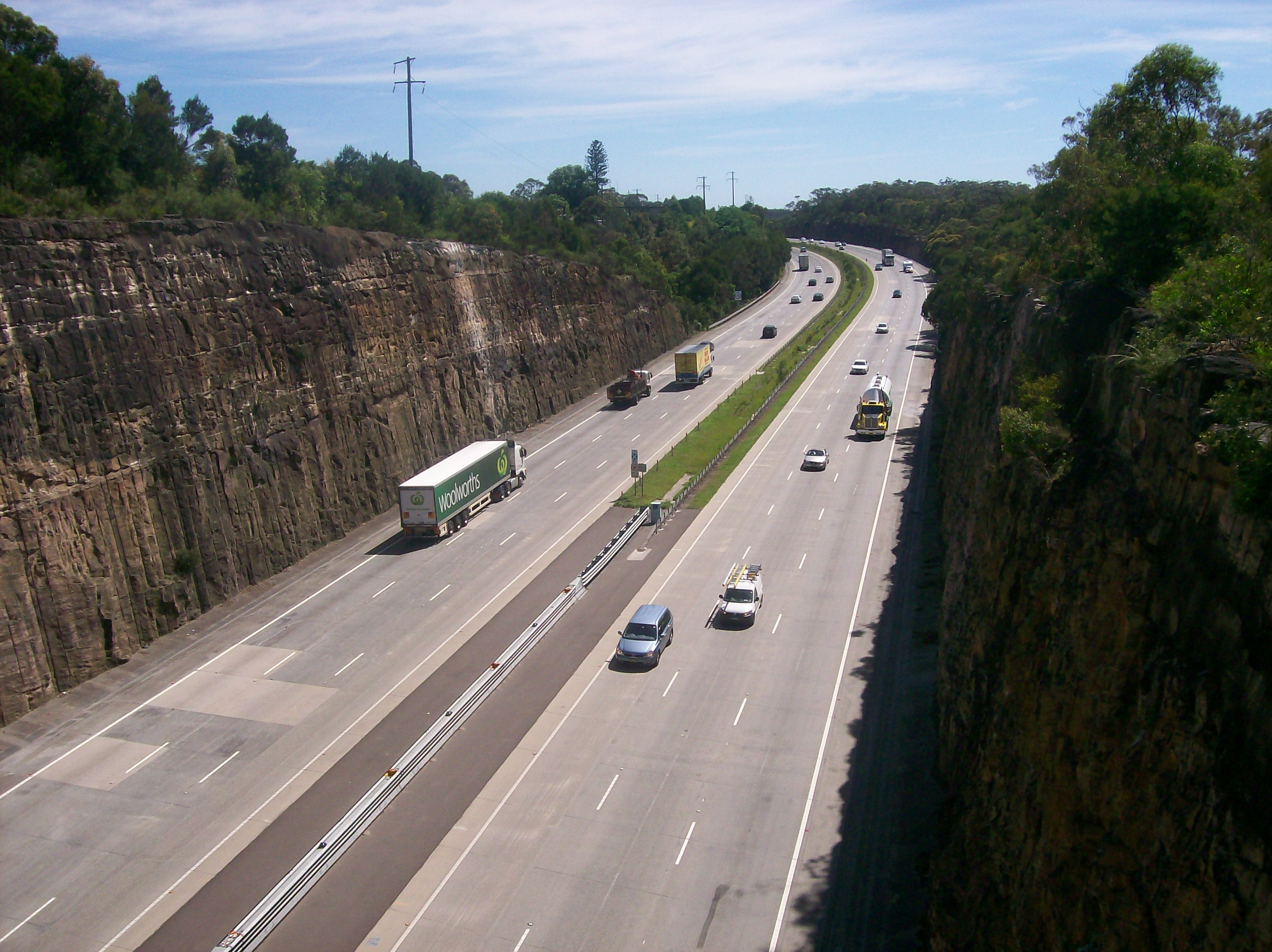
Pacific Motorway (Sydney–Newcastle) north of the Hawkesbury River

Major roads are the concern of both federal and state governments. The latter maintains these through the Transport for NSW agency.

The main roads in New South Wales are

- Hume Highway linking Sydney to Melbourne, Victoria
- Princes Highway linking Sydney to Melbourne via the Tasman Sea coast
- Pacific Highway linking Sydney to Brisbane, Queensland via the Pacific coast
- New England Highway running from the Pacific Highway, at Newcastle to Brisbane by an inland route
- Federal Highway running from the Hume Highway south of Goulburn to Canberra, Australian Capital Territory
- Sturt Highway running from the Hume Highway near Gundagai to Adelaide, South Australia
- Newell Highway linking rural Victoria with Queensland, passing through the centre of New South Wales
- Great Western Highway linking Sydney with Bathurst, as Route 32 it continues west as the Mitchell Highway then as the Barrier Highway to Adelaide via Broken Hill

Other roads are usually the concern of the TfNSW or the local government authority.

=== Air ===
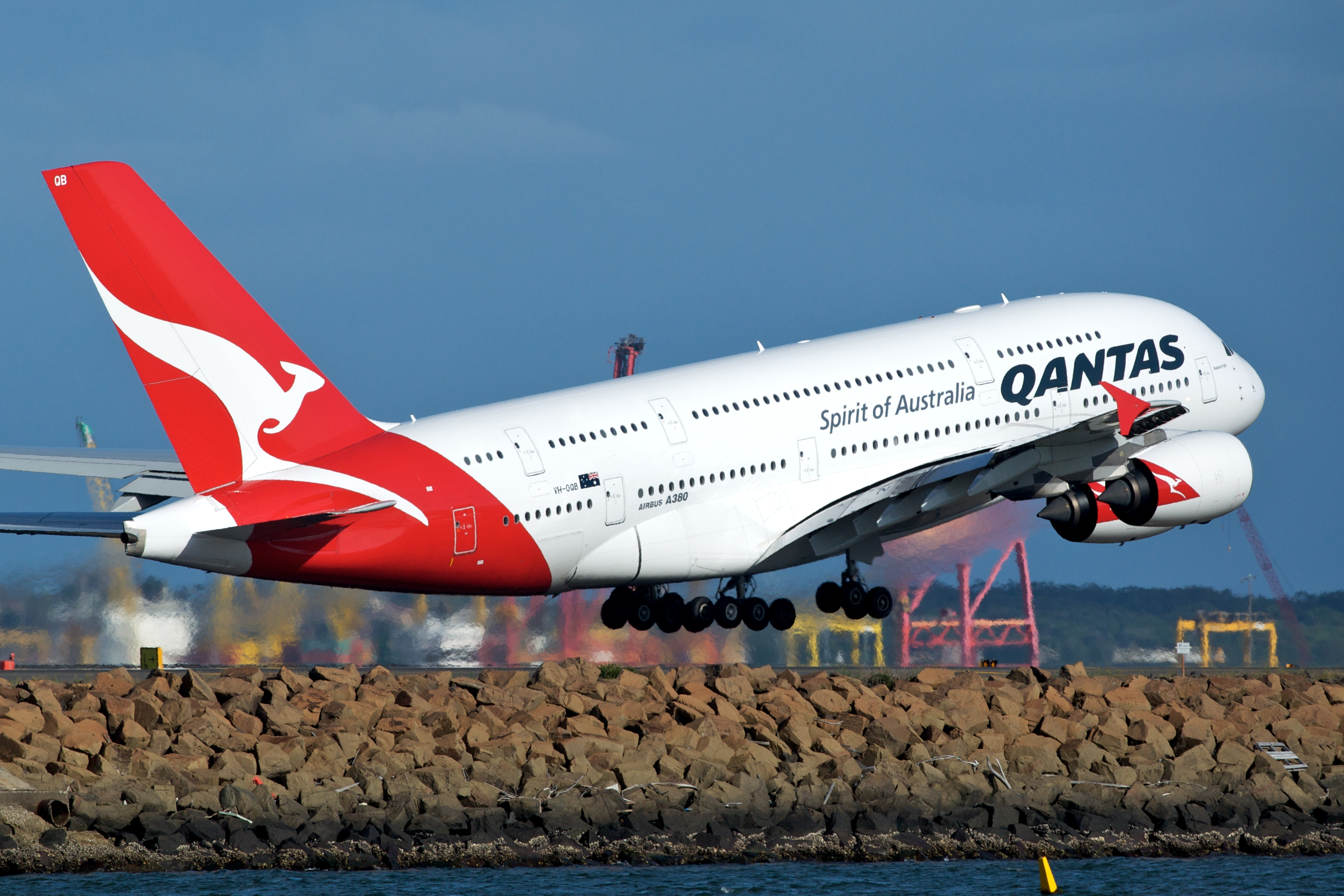
Qantas Airbus A380 taking off at Sydney Airport

Sydney Kingsford-Smith Airport located in Mascot is the principal airport for Sydney. It is accompanied by Western Sydney Airport in the suburb of Badgerys Creek. Kingsford-Smith is a hub for Australia's national airline Qantas.

Other airlines serving regional New South Wales include: NSW Rural and Regional Air Transport Operators

- FlyPelican
- Jetstar
- Rex Airlines
- Virgin Australia
- Corporate Air

=== Ferries ===
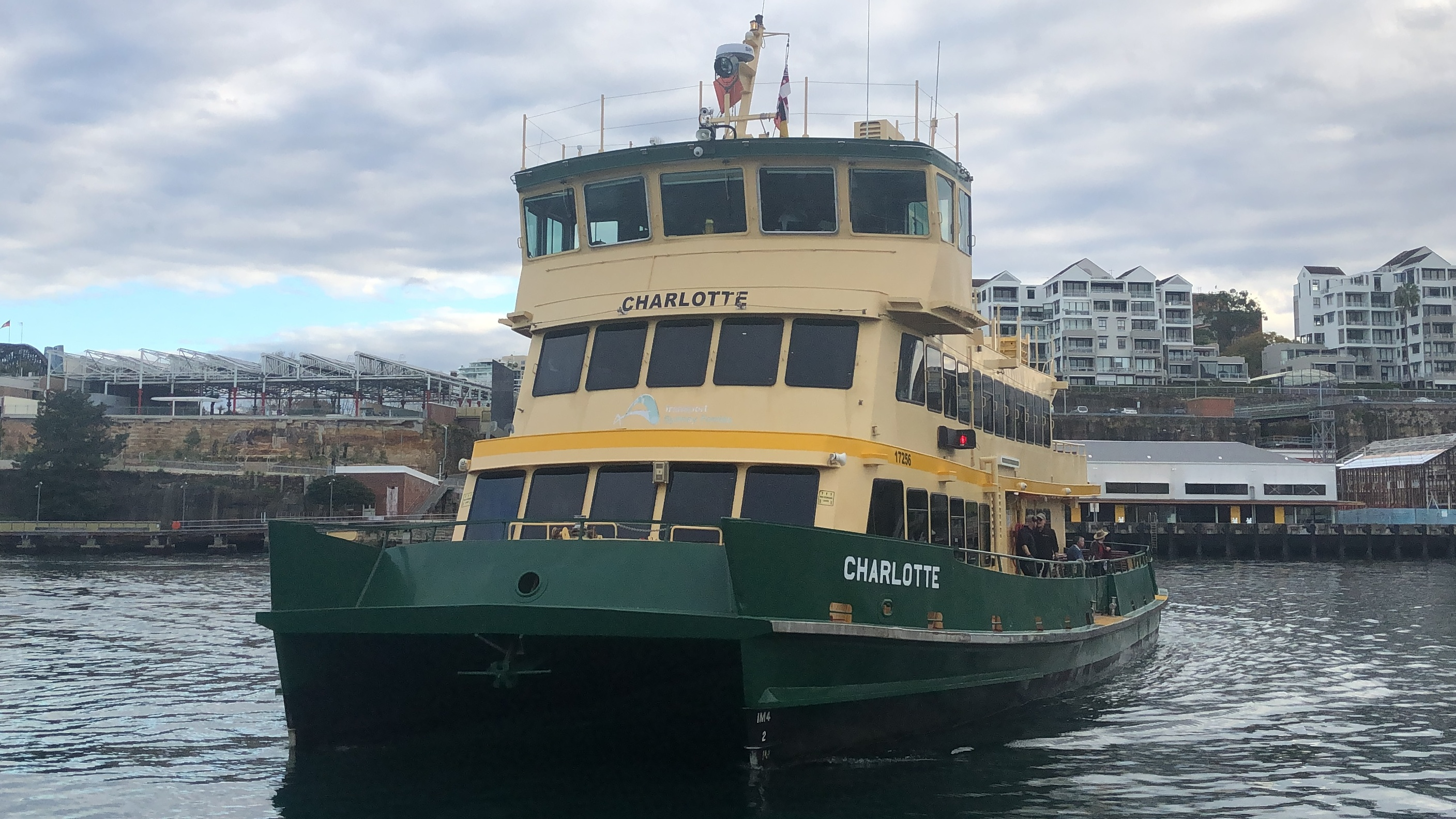
A First Fleet-class ferry at Neutral Bay

Transdev Sydney Ferries operates Sydney Ferries services within Sydney Harbour and the Parramatta River, while Newcastle Transport has a ferry service within Newcastle. All other ferry services are privately operated.

Spirit of Tasmania ran a commercial ferry service between Sydney and Devonport, Tasmania. This service was terminated in 2006.

Private boat services operated between South Australia, Victoria and New South Wales along the Murray and Darling Rivers but these only exist now as the occasional tourist paddle-wheeler service.

== National parks ==
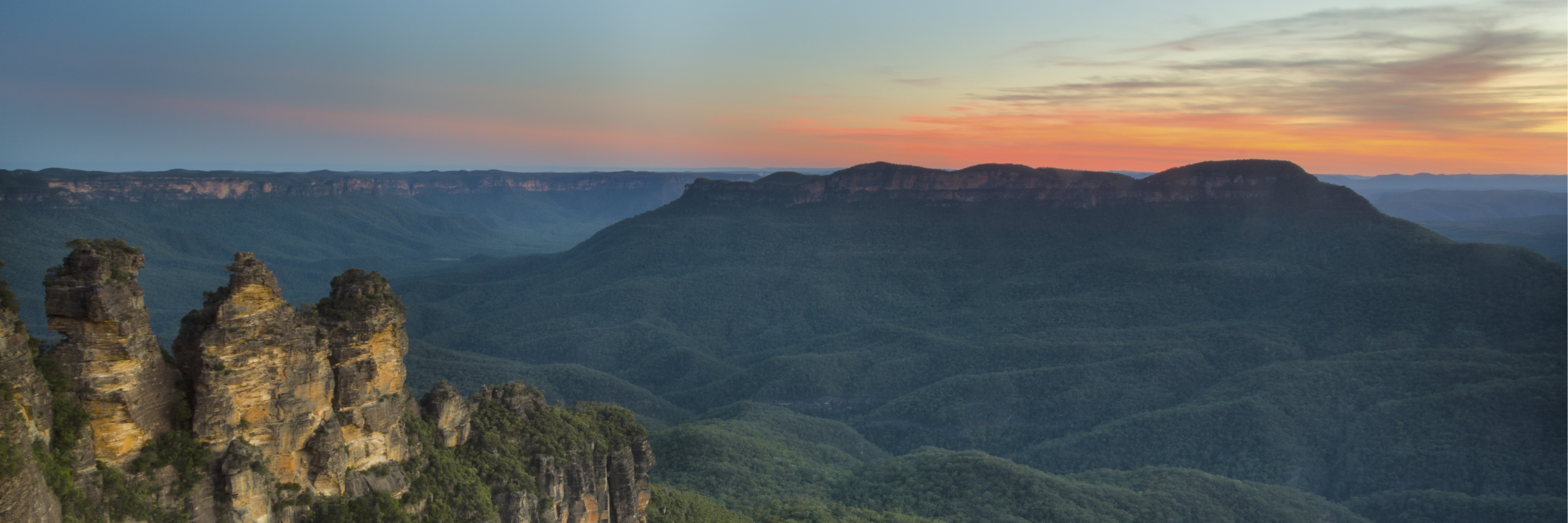
Three Sisters rock formation in the Blue Mountains National Park

New South Wales has more than 780 national parks and reserves covering more than 8% of the state. These parks range from rainforests, waterfalls, rugged bush to marine wonderlands and outback deserts, including World Heritage sites.

The Royal National Park on the southern outskirts of Sydney became Australia's first national park when proclaimed on 26 April 1879. Originally named simply 'National Park' until 1955, this park was the second national park to be established in the world after Yellowstone National Park in the U.S. Kosciuszko National Park is the largest park in state encompassing New South Wales' alpine region.

The National Parks Association was formed in 1957 to create a system of national parks all over New South Wales which led to the formation of the National Parks and Wildlife Service in 1967. This government agency is responsible for developing and maintaining the parks and reserve system, and conserving natural and cultural heritage, in the state of New South Wales. These parks preserve special habitats, plants and wildlife, such as the Wollemi National Park where the Wollemi Pine grows and areas sacred to Australian Aboriginals such as Mutawintji National Park in western New South Wales.

== Sport ==
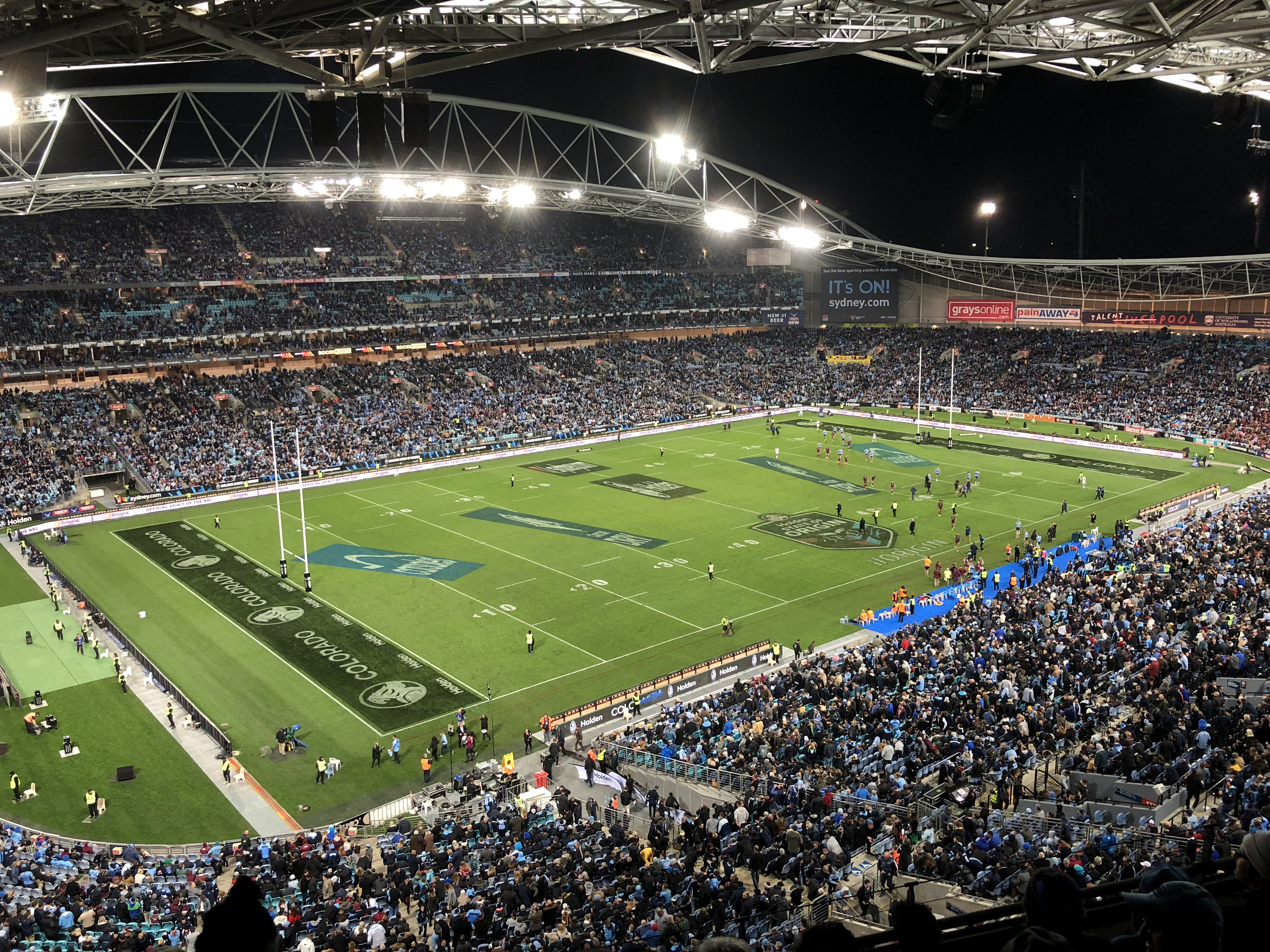
Stadium Australia

The most popular sports by participation in the state are soccer and tennis. The National Rugby League, which is based in Sydney, is the dominant professional spectator sport. In rugby league, the state is represented by the New South Wales Blues in the State of Origin series. The state hosts 10 of the 17 NRL teams: the Canterbury-Bankstown Bulldogs, Cronulla-Sutherland Sharks, Manly-Warringah Sea Eagles, Newcastle Knights, Parramatta Eels, Penrith Panthers, St George Illawarra Dragons, South Sydney Rabbitohs, Sydney Roosters, and Wests Tigers. Other rugby league competitions in the state include the NSW Cup, the Sydney A-Grade, and regional competitions administered by the NSWRL's Country Rugby League division.

The main summer sport is cricket, and the Sydney Cricket Ground hosts the 'New Year' cricket Test match in January each year. The NSW Blues play in the One-Day Cup and Sheffield Shield competitions. Sydney Sixers and Sydney Thunder both play in the Big Bash League.

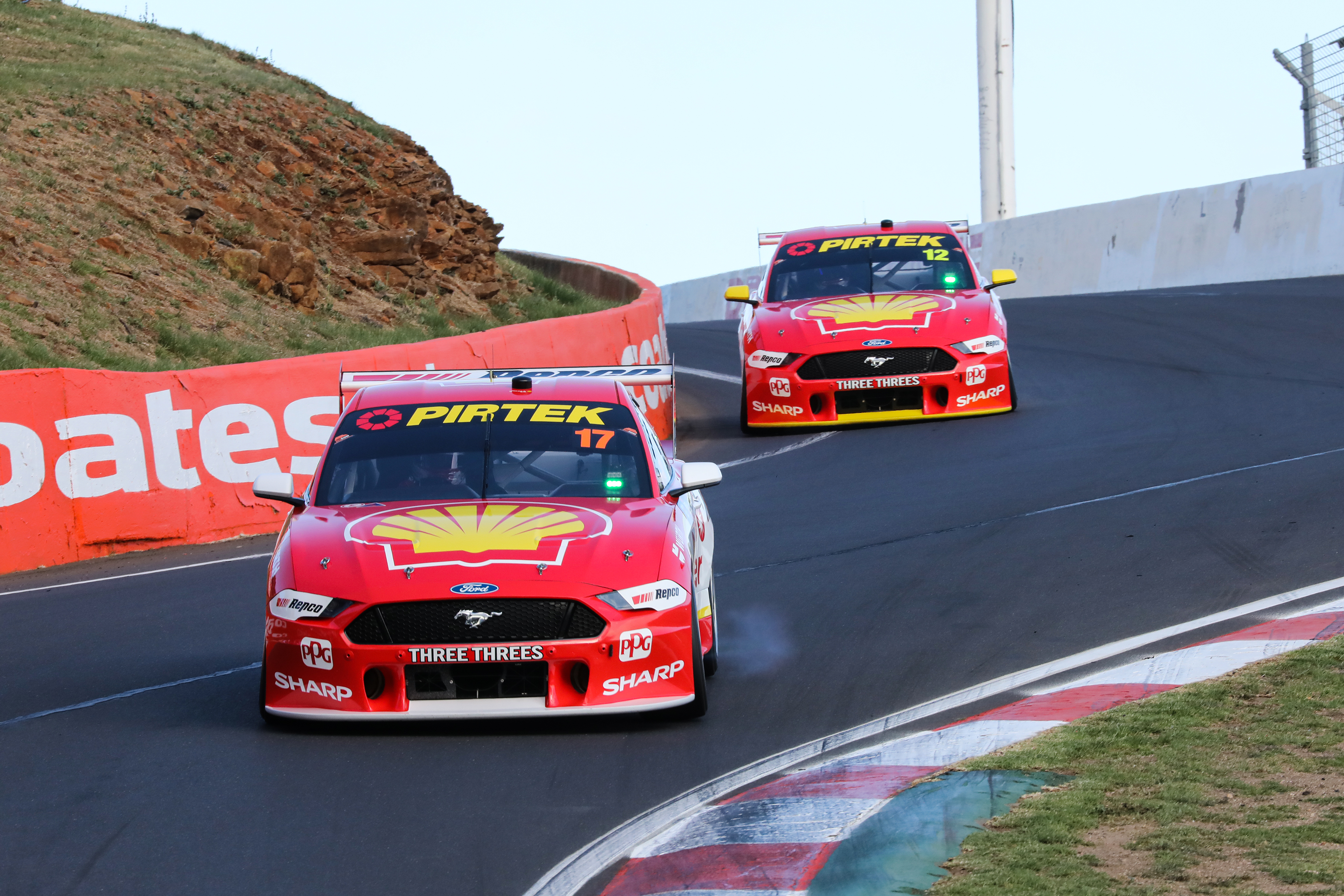
The Bathurst 1000, held at Mount Panorama Circuit in Bathurst

The state is represented in the Australian Football League by the Sydney Swans, and the Greater Western Sydney Giants who entered the competition in 2012.

The state is represented by five teams in soccer's A-League: Sydney FC, Western Sydney Wanderers (2014 Asian champions), Central Coast Mariners, Newcastle Jets and Macarthur FC.

In Rugby union, the state is represented by the New South Wales Waratahs in the Super Rugby.

Other teams in major national competitions include the Sydney Kings and Illawarra Hawks in the National Basketball League, Sydney Uni Flames in the Women's National Basketball League, and New South Wales Swifts in Super Netball.

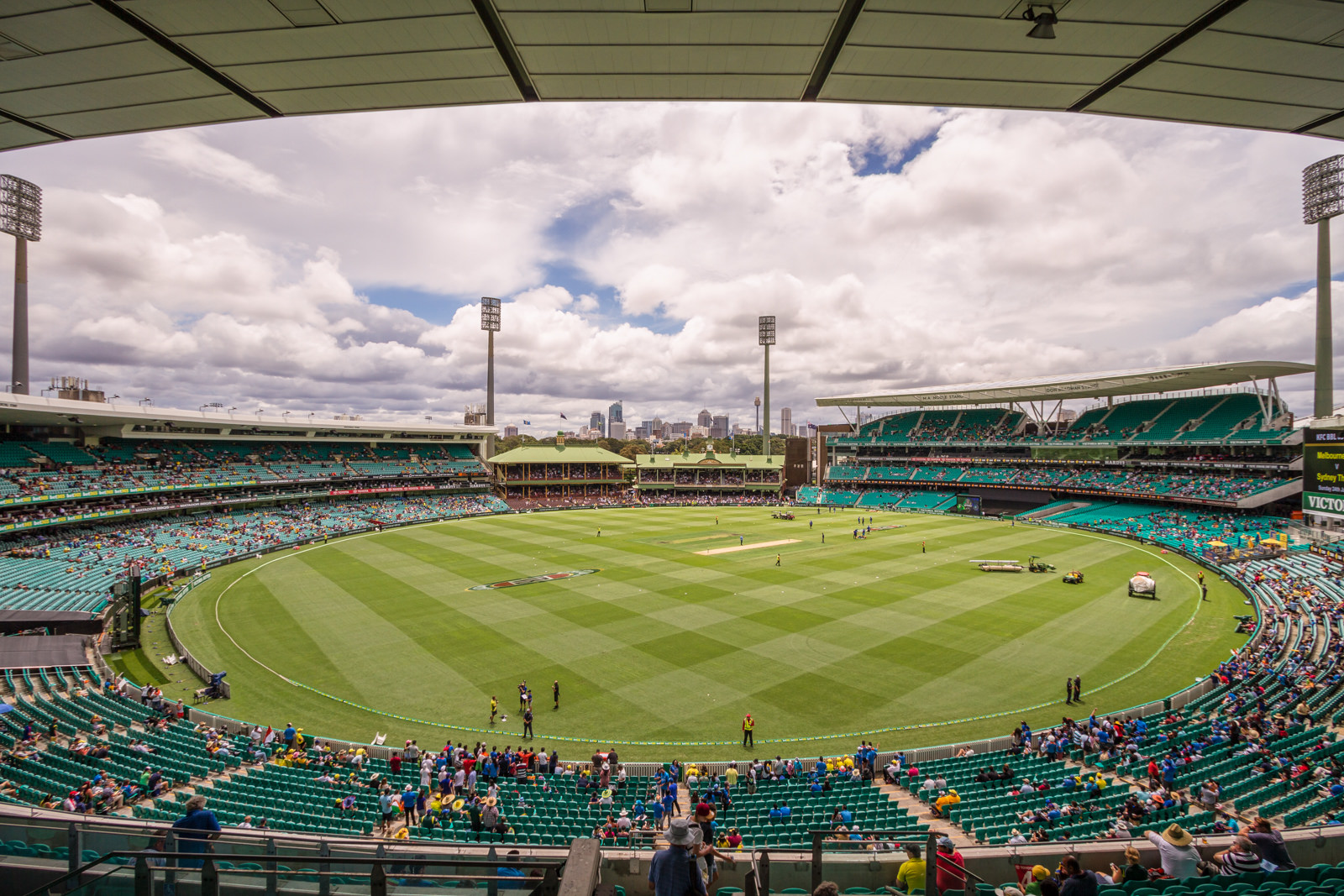
The Sydney Cricket Ground

Sydney was the host of the 1938 British Empire Games and 2000 Summer Olympics. The Stadium Australia hosts major events including the NRL Grand Final, State of Origin, rugby union and soccer internationals.

The annual Sydney to Hobart Yacht Race begins in Sydney Harbour on Boxing Day. Bathurst hosts the annual Bathurst 1000 as part of the Supercars Championship at Mount Panorama Circuit.

The equine sports of campdrafting and polocrosse were developed in New South Wales and competitions are now held across Australia. Polocrosse is now played in many overseas countries.

Other professional teams include:

- Baseball: Sydney Blue Sox
- Ice hockey: Newcastle Northstars, Sydney Bears, Sydney Ice Dogs
- Motor racing: Brad Jones Racing, Team Sydney

== Culture ==
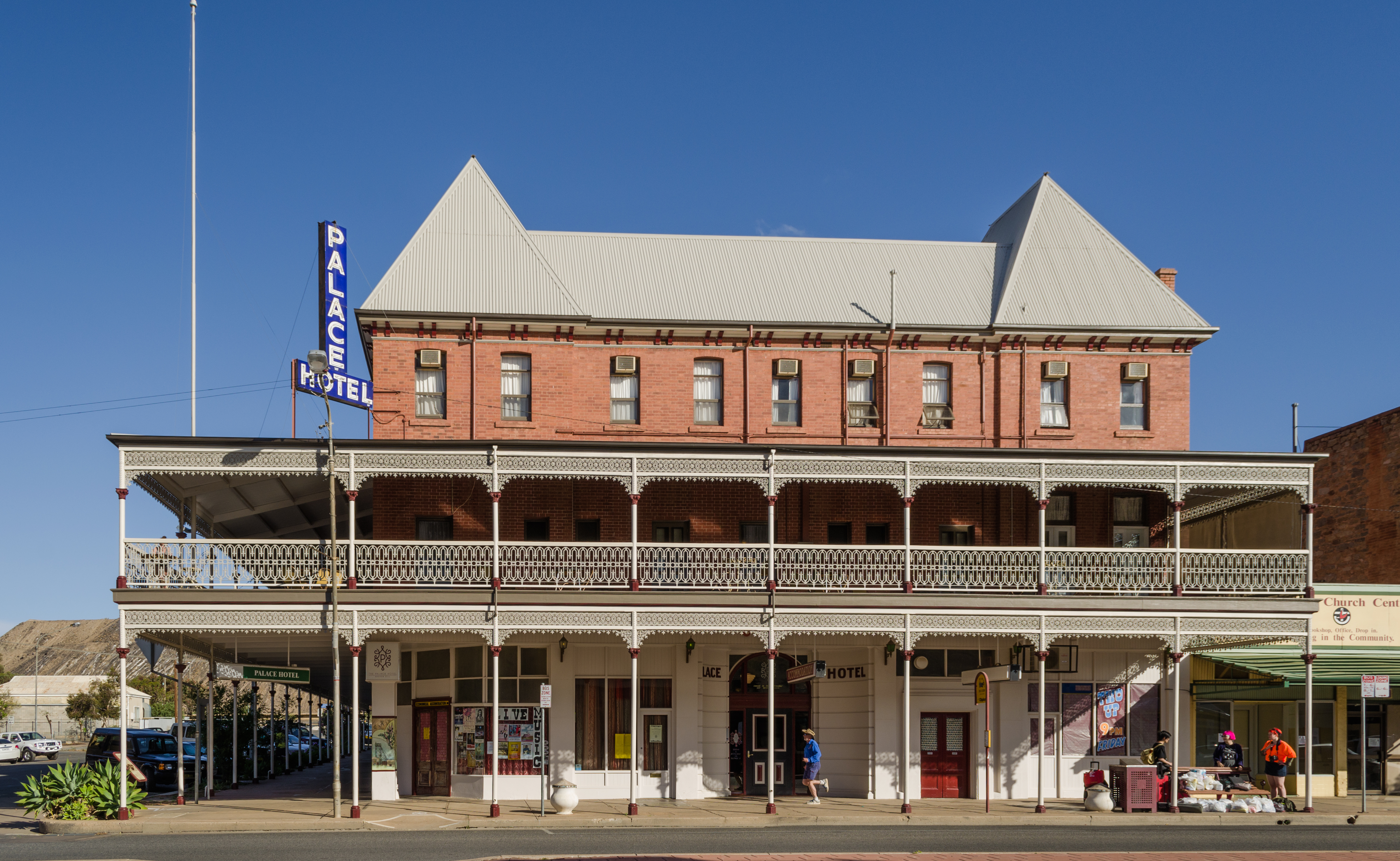
The Palace Hotel in Broken Hill, the only town in Australia to be listed on the National Heritage List

As Australia's most populous state, New South Wales is home to several cultural institutions of importance to the nation. In music, New South Wales is home to the Sydney Symphony Orchestra, Australia's busiest and largest orchestra. Australia's largest opera company, Opera Australia, is headquartered in Sydney. Both of these organisations perform a subscription series at the Sydney Opera House. Other major musical bodies include the Australian Chamber Orchestra. Sydney is host to the Australian Ballet for its Sydney season (the ballet is headquartered in Melbourne). Apart from the Sydney Opera House, major musical performance venues include the City Recital Hall and the Sydney Town Hall.

New South Wales is home to several major museums and art galleries, including the Australian Museum, the Powerhouse Museum, the Museum of Sydney, the Art Gallery of New South Wales and the Museum of Contemporary Art.

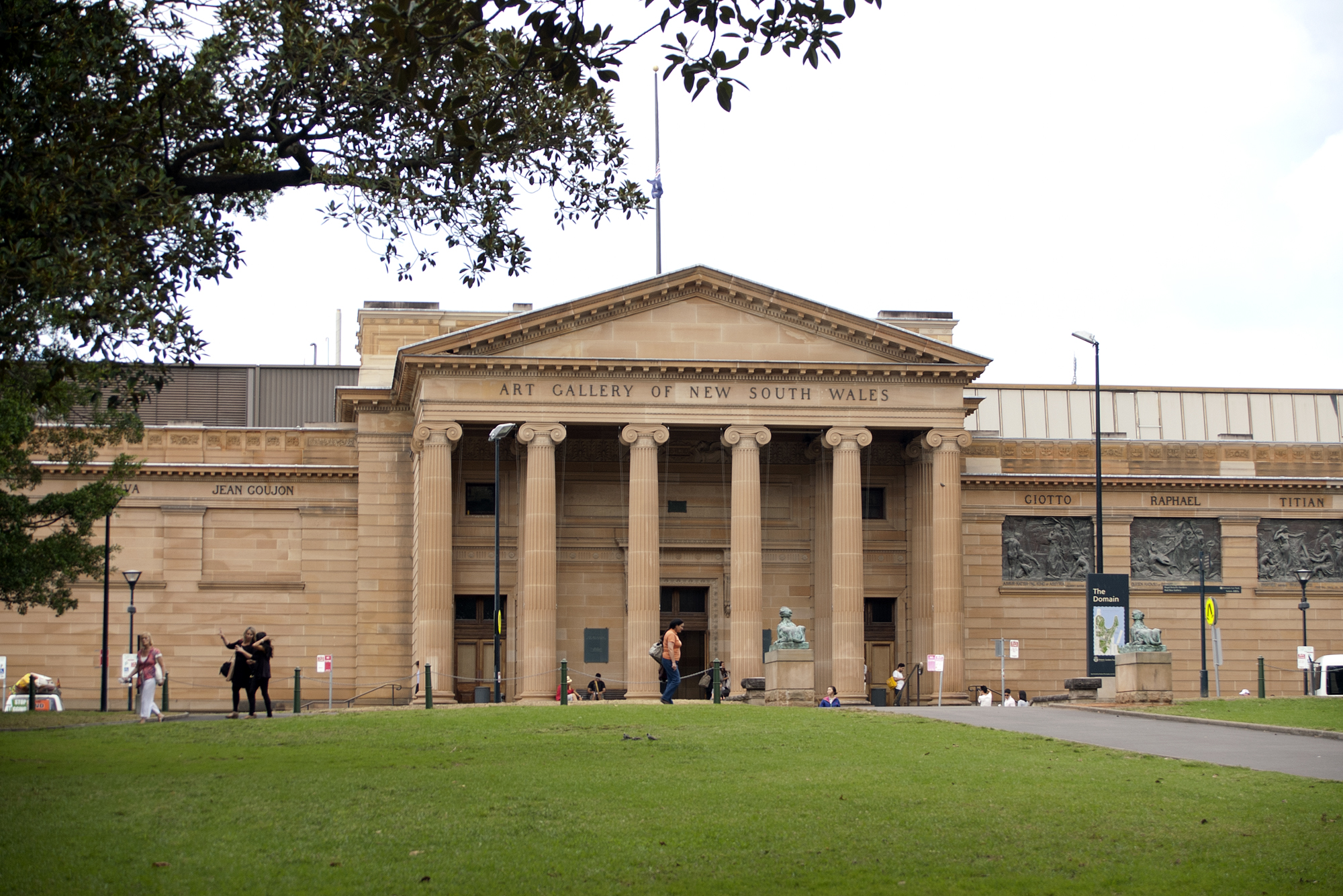
The Art Gallery of New South Wales

Sydney is home to five Arts teaching organisations, which have all produced world-famous students: The National Art School, The College of Fine Arts, the National Institute of Dramatic Art (NIDA), the Australian Film, Television & Radio School and the Conservatorium of Music (now part of the University of Sydney).

New South Wales is the setting and shooting location of many Australian films, including Mad Max 2, which was shot near the mining town of Broken Hill. The state has also attracted international productions, both as a setting, such as in Mission: Impossible 2, the 2023 feature film Anyone But You and as a stand-in for other locations, as seen in The Matrix franchise, The Great Gatsby and Unbroken. 20th Century Fox operates Fox Studios Australia in Sydney. Screen NSW, which controls the state film industry, generates approximately $100 million into the New South Wales economy each year.

== Sister states ==
New South Wales in recent history has pursued bilateral partnerships with other federated states/provinces and metropolises through establishing a network of sister state relationships. The state currently has 7 sister states:

- Guangdong, China (since 1979)
- Tokyo, Japan (since 1984)
- Ehime, Japan (since 1999)
- North Rhine-Westphalia, Germany (since 1989)
- Seoul, South Korea (since 1991)
- Jakarta, Indonesia (since 1994)
- California, United States (since 1997)

== See also ==
- Geology of New South Wales
- Outline of Australia
- Outline of New South Wales
- Postage stamps and postal history of New South Wales
- Selection (Australian history)
- Squattocracy
