= Electoral results for the district of Rockdale =

Election results for Rockdale, New South Wales, Australia

Rockdale, an electoral district of the Legislative Assembly in the Australian state of New South Wales, has had two incarnations, the first from 1927 to 1930, the second from in 1941 to the present.

== Members ==
First incarnation (1927–1930)
Election	Member	Party
1927	Guy Arkins	Nationalist
Second incarnation (1941–present)
Election	Member	Party
1941	John McGrath	Labor
1944	John McGrath	Labor
1947	John McGrath	Labor
1950	John McGrath	Labor
1953	John McGrath	Labor
1956	John McGrath	Labor
1959	Brian Bannon	Labor
1962	Brian Bannon	Labor
1965	Brian Bannon	Labor
1968	Brian Bannon	Labor
1971	Brian Bannon	Labor
1973	Brian Bannon	Labor
1976	Brian Bannon	Labor
1978	Brian Bannon	Labor
1981	Brian Bannon	Labor
1984	Brian Bannon	Labor
1986 by	Barrie Unsworth	Labor
1988	Barrie Unsworth	Labor
1991	George Thompson	Labor
1995	George Thompson	Labor
1999	George Thompson	Labor
2003	Frank Sartor	Labor
2007	Frank Sartor	Labor
2011	John Flowers	Liberal
2015	Steve Kamper	Labor
2019	Steve Kamper	Labor
2023	Steve Kamper	Labor

== Election results ==
=== Elections in the 2020s ===
==== 2023 ====
2023 New South Wales state election: Rockdale
Party	Candidate	Votes	%	±%
Labor	Steve Kamper	24,893	52.9	+6.8
Liberal	Muhammad Rana	13,942	29.6	−3.6
Greens	Peter Strong	5,109	10.9	+2.8
Sustainable Australia	James Morris	3,127	6.6	+6.6
Total formal votes		47,071	95.2	−0.2
Informal votes		2,378	4.8	+0.2
Turnout		49,449	87.1	−1.5
Two-party-preferred result
Labor	Steve Kamper	28,468	65.4	+5.4
Liberal	Muhammad Rana	15,086	34.6	−5.4
Labor hold		Swing	+5.4	

=== Elections in the 2010s ===
==== 2019 ====
2019 New South Wales state election: Rockdale
Party	Candidate	Votes	%	±%
Labor	Steve Kamper	21,945	45.82	−0.08
Liberal	Sam Hassan	16,118	33.65	−5.63
Greens	Peter Strong	3,829	8.00	+1.09
Keep Sydney Open	George Tulloch	2,865	5.98	+5.98
Animal Justice	Paul Collaros	1,800	3.76	+3.76
Independent	Hussein Faraj	1,335	2.79	+2.79
Total formal votes		47,892	95.38	−0.21
Informal votes		2,318	4.62	+0.21
Turnout		50,210	88.99	−1.01
Two-party-preferred result
Labor	Steve Kamper	25,077	59.55	+4.80
Liberal	Sam Hassan	17,037	40.45	−4.80
Labor hold		Swing	+4.80	

==== 2015 ====
2015 New South Wales state election: Rockdale
Party	Candidate	Votes	%	±%
Labor	Steve Kamper	21,242	45.9	+9.6
Liberal	John Flowers	18,182	39.3	−4.0
Greens	Madeleina Snowdon	3,194	6.9	−1.9
Christian Democrats	Lena El-Daghl	1,498	3.2	−1.0
No Land Tax	Sam Choker	1,154	2.5	+2.5
Independent	Jamal Daoud	1,009	2.2	+2.2
Total formal votes		46,279	95.6	+0.1
Informal votes		2,132	4.4	−0.1
Turnout		48,411	90.0	+0.2
Two-party-preferred result
Labor	Steve Kamper	23,121	54.8	+8.3
Liberal	John Flowers	19,107	45.3	−8.3
Labor gain from Liberal		Swing	+8.3	

==== 2011 ====
2011 New South Wales state election: Rockdale
Party	Candidate	Votes	%	±%
Liberal	John Flowers	19,072	43.3	+9.9
Labor	Steve Kamper	15,990	36.3	−14.0
Greens	Lauren Moore	3,877	8.8	+1.2
Independent	Michael Nagi	3,274	7.4	+7.4
Christian Democrats	Anita Strezova	1,881	4.3	+4.3
Total formal votes		44,094	96.2	+0.4
Informal votes		1,757	3.8	−0.4
Turnout		45,851	92.7	
Two-party-preferred result
Liberal	John Flowers	20,546	53.6	+13.9
Labor	Steve Kamper	17,805	46.4	−13.9
Liberal gain from Labor		Swing	+13.9	

=== Elections in the 2000s ===
==== 2007 ====
2007 New South Wales state election: Rockdale
Party	Candidate	Votes	%	±%
Labor	Frank Sartor	20,891	50.2	+0.7
Liberal	Lili Gestakovska	13,864	33.3	+9.2
Greens	Liam McGillicuddy	3,139	7.5	+1.1
Independent	Brian Walsh	1,672	4.0	+4.0
Unity	Gang Wang	1,036	2.5	+0.8
	Amin Abbas	533	1.3	+1.3
Save Our Suburbs	Lesleyanne Azel	461	1.1	+0.3
Total formal votes		41,596	95.8	−0.3
Informal votes		1,816	4.2	+0.3
Turnout		43,412	93.1	
Two-party-preferred result
Labor	Frank Sartor	22,486	60.3	−5.5
Liberal	Lili Gestakovska	14,807	39.7	+5.5
Labor hold		Swing	−5.5	

==== 2003 ====
2003 New South Wales state election: Rockdale
Party	Candidate	Votes	%	±%
Labor	Frank Sartor	19,122	49.1	−6.8
Liberal	Jan Brennan	9,205	23.6	−4.0
Independent	Kevin Ryan	3,653	9.4	+9.4
Greens	Lesa De Leau	2,510	6.4	+3.4
Independent	Mahmoud Ghalayini	1,275	3.3	+3.3
Independent	John Nikolovski	795	2.0	+2.0
Christian Democrats	Stephen Winter	747	1.9	+1.9
Unity	Cong Tran	674	1.7	+1.7
AAFI	Thomas Foley	378	1.0	+0.1
Save Our Suburbs	Mark Curran	335	0.9	+0.9
Democrats	Eoin Coghlan	240	0.6	−2.1
Total formal votes		38,934	96.1	+0.0
Informal votes		1,600	3.9	−0.0
Turnout		40,534	92.2	
Two-party-preferred result
Labor	Frank Sartor	21,139	65.9	−0.6
Liberal	Jan Brennan	10,938	34.1	+0.6
Labor hold		Swing	−0.6	

=== Elections in the 1990s ===
==== 1999 ====
1999 New South Wales state election: Rockdale
Party	Candidate	Votes	%	±%
Labor	George Thompson	22,258	55.9	+2.9
Liberal	Phillip Kaloudis	11,003	27.6	−11.4
One Nation	Michael Citton	2,185	5.5	+5.5
Greens	Nola Taylor	1,191	3.0	+3.0
Democrats	Craig Chung	1,087	2.7	−1.9
Independent	Peter Johnson	818	2.1	+2.1
Independent	Joanne Jones	651	1.6	+1.6
AAFI	Ian Gelling	339	0.9	+0.9
Independent	William Ryan	172	0.4	+0.4
Non-Custodial Parents	Pino Cardillo	128	0.3	+0.3
Total formal votes		39,832	96.1	+2.6
Informal votes		1,629	3.9	−2.6
Turnout		41,461	92.5	
Two-party-preferred result
Labor	George Thompson	23,930	66.5	+8.7
Liberal	Phillip Kaloudis	12,042	33.5	−8.7
Labor hold		Swing	+8.7	

==== 1995 ====
1995 New South Wales state election: Rockdale
Party	Candidate	Votes	%	±%
Labor	George Thompson	17,827	55.4	+4.7
Liberal	Graham Abel	11,541	35.9	−3.9
Democrats	Reagan Murphy	1,479	4.6	+1.2
Transport Action Group	Nola Taylor	1,324	4.1	+4.1
Total formal votes		32,171	92.9	+6.1
Informal votes		2,477	7.1	−6.1
Turnout		34,648	94.2	
Two-party-preferred result
Labor	George Thompson	19,134	61.2	+4.4
Liberal	Graham Abel	12,125	38.8	−4.4
Labor hold		Swing	+4.4	

==== 1991 ====
1991 New South Wales state election: Rockdale
Party	Candidate	Votes	%	±%
Labor	George Thompson	15,110	50.7	−1.5
Liberal	Peter Johnson	11,859	39.8	+2.4
Democrats	Leslie Wand	1,005	3.4	+3.4
Independent	Sergio Bustamante	969	3.2	+3.2
Independent	Anne Targett	875	2.9	+2.9
Total formal votes		29,818	86.8	−9.4
Informal votes		4,541	13.2	+9.4
Turnout		34,359	94.0	
Two-party-preferred result
Labor	George Thompson	16,350	56.8	+1.6
Liberal	Peter Johnson	12,454	43.2	−1.6
Labor hold		Swing	+1.6	

=== Elections in the 1980s ===
==== 1988 ====
1988 New South Wales state election: Rockdale
Party	Candidate	Votes	%	±%
Labor	Barrie Unsworth	15,793	53.6	−9.6
Liberal	Bob Gemmell	9,878	33.6	−0.5
Independent EFF	Ian Yates	3,251	11.0	+11.0
Independent	Robert Routledge	520	1.8	+1.8
Total formal votes		29,442	96.2	−0.5
Informal votes		1,148	3.8	+0.5
Turnout		30,590	93.6	
Two-party-preferred result
Labor	Barrie Unsworth	16,382	57.0	−7.6
Liberal	Bob Gemmell	12,359	43.0	+7.6
Labor hold		Swing	−7.6	

==== 1986 by-election ====
1986 Rockdale by-election Saturday 2 August
Party	Candidate	Votes	%	±%
Labor	Barrie Unsworth	11,251	46.17	−17.10
Liberal	Bob Gemmell	9,896	40.61	+6.53
Independent	James McLean	1,720	7.06	+7.06
Socialist Workers	Valmai Frances Edwards	725	2.98	+2.98
Independent	John Badman	375	1.54	+1.54
Independent	Charles Bellchambers	334	1.37	−1.28
Uninflated Movement	Nadar Ponnuswamy	67	0.27	+0.27
Total formal votes		24,368	96.50	−0.21
Informal votes		885	3.50	+0.21
Turnout		25,253	79.59	−13.17
Two-party-preferred result
Labor	Barrie Unsworth	11,946	50.11	−14.5 (Note: Since the two-party preferred count was not conducted for Rockdale in 1984, the two party preferred swing at the by-election cannot be calculated precisely. ABC election analyst Antony Green estimates a two party preferred swing of 14.5% against the Labor Party.)
Liberal	Bob Gemmell	11,892	49.89	+14.5
Labor hold		Swing	−14.5	

Labor MP Brian Bannon resigned.

==== 1984 ====
1984 New South Wales state election: Rockdale
Party	Candidate	Votes	%	±%
Labor	Brian Bannon	18,015	63.3	−5.9
Liberal	Bob Gemmell	9,705	34.1	+3.3
Independent	Edwin Bellchambers	755	2.6	+2.6
Total formal votes		28,475	96.7	+0.6
Informal votes		968	3.3	−0.6
Turnout		29,443	92.8	+1.4
Two-party-preferred result
Labor	Brian Bannon		64.6	−4.6
Liberal	Bob Gemmell		35.4	+4.6
Labor hold		Swing	−4.6	

==== 1981 ====
1981 New South Wales state election: Rockdale
Party	Candidate	Votes	%	±%
Labor	Brian Bannon	18,639	69.2	
Liberal	John Tonkin	8,294	30.8	
Total formal votes		26,933	96.1	
Informal votes		1,094	3.9	
Turnout		28,027	91.4	
Labor hold		Swing	−2.5	

=== Elections in the 1970s ===
==== 1978 ====
1978 New South Wales state election: Rockdale
Party	Candidate	Votes	%	±%
Labor	Brian Bannon	21,643	75.2	+8.7
Liberal	Joan Loew	5,651	19.6	−13.9
Independent	Edwin Bellchambers	1,501	5.2	+5.2
Total formal votes		28,795	96.8	−0.4
Informal votes		953	3.2	+0.4
Turnout		29,748	92.3	−1.1
Two-party-preferred result
Labor	Brian Bannon	22,943	79.7	+13.2
Liberal	Joan Loew	5,852	20.3	−13.2
Labor hold		Swing	+13.2	

==== 1976 ====
1976 New South Wales state election: Rockdale
Party	Candidate	Votes	%	±%
Labor	Brian Bannon	19,017	66.5	+3.8
Liberal	Raymond Scaysbrook	9,597	33.5	−0.2
Total formal votes		28,614	97.2	+0.9
Informal votes		814	2.8	−0.9
Turnout		29,428	93.4	−0.1
Labor hold		Swing	+3.1	

==== 1973 ====
1973 New South Wales state election: Rockdale
Party	Candidate	Votes	%	±%
Labor	Brian Bannon	16,826	62.7	
Liberal	Kenneth Gates	9,056	33.7	
Democratic Labor	Alan Lewis	968	3.6	
Total formal votes		26,850	96.3	
Informal votes		1,019	3.7	
Turnout		27,869	93.5	
Two-party-preferred result
Labor	Brian Bannon	17,020	63.4	0.0
Liberal	Kenneth Gates	9,830	36.6	0.0
Labor hold		Swing	0.0	

==== 1971 ====
1971 New South Wales state election: Rockdale
Party	Candidate	Votes	%	±%
Labor	Brian Bannon	14,983	57.3	+2.2
Liberal	Roye Gaha	9,681	37.0	+4.5
Democratic Labor	Mary Hennessy	1,053	4.0	+0.5
Independent	Edwin Bellchambers	424	1.6	+1.6
Total formal votes		26,141	97.5	
Informal votes		677	2.5	
Turnout		26,818	93.7	
Two-party-preferred result
Labor	Brian Bannon	15,406	58.9	+3.2
Liberal	Roye Gaha	10,735	41.1	−3.2
Labor hold		Swing	+3.2	

=== Elections in the 1960s ===
==== 1968 ====
1968 New South Wales state election: Rockdale
Party	Candidate	Votes	%	±%
Labor	Brian Bannon	14,420	55.1	+2.4
Liberal	Harold Heslehurst	10,860	41.5	−2.7
Democratic Labor	Peter Height	916	3.5	+3.5
Total formal votes		26,196	97.2	
Informal votes		759	2.8	
Turnout		26,955	94.2	
Two-party-preferred result
Labor	Brian Bannon	14,603	55.7	+1.4
Liberal	Harold Heslehurst	11,593	44.3	−1.4
Labor hold		Swing	+1.4	

==== 1965 ====
1965 New South Wales state election: Rockdale
Party	Candidate	Votes	%	±%
Labor	Brian Bannon	12,828	52.7	−2.1
Liberal	Angus Bristow	10,749	44.2	+3.0
Independent	Keith Richardson	763	3.1	+3.1
Total formal votes		24,340	98.2	−0.5
Informal votes		435	1.8	+0.5
Turnout		24,775	94.4	−0.3
Two-party-preferred result
Labor	Brian Bannon	13,210	54.3	−1.3
Liberal	Angus Bristow	11,130	45.7	+1.3
Labor hold		Swing	−1.3	

==== 1962 ====
1962 New South Wales state election: Rockdale
Party	Candidate	Votes	%	±%
Labor	Brian Bannon	13,544	54.8	+8.7
Liberal	Sidney Alewood	10,185	41.2	−2.1
Democratic Labor	Brian Adams	1,006	4.1	+0.7
Total formal votes		24,735	98.7	
Informal votes		330	1.3	
Turnout		25,065	94.7	
Two-party-preferred result
Labor	Brian Bannon	13,745	55.6	+4.2
Liberal	Sidney Alewood	10,990	44.4	−4.2
Labor hold		Swing	+4.2	

=== Elections in the 1950s ===
==== 1959 ====
1959 New South Wales state election: Rockdale
Party	Candidate	Votes	%	±%
Labor	Brian Bannon	10,035	46.1	
Liberal	Ronald Hislop	9,426	43.3	
Independent	Arthur Henderson	1,587	7.3	
Democratic Labor	Wesley Johns	742	3.4	
Total formal votes		21,790	98.0	
Informal votes		449	2.0	
Turnout		22,239	95.0	
Two-party-preferred result
Labor	Brian Bannon	11,208	51.4	
Liberal	Ronald Hislop	10,582	48.6	
Labor hold		Swing		

==== 1956 ====
1956 New South Wales state election: Rockdale
Party	Candidate	Votes	%	±%
Labor	John McGrath	11,469	51.3	−9.2
Liberal	Harold Heslehurst	10,890	48.7	+9.2
Total formal votes		22,359	98.3	+0.8
Informal votes		387	1.7	−0.8
Turnout		22,746	94.1	−0.4
Labor hold		Swing	−9.2	

==== 1953 ====
1953 New South Wales state election: Rockdale
Party	Candidate	Votes	%	±%
Labor	John McGrath	14,041	60.5	
Liberal	Harold Heslehurst	9,165	39.5	
Total formal votes		23,206	97.9	
Informal votes		489	2.1	
Turnout		23,695	94.5	
Labor hold		Swing		

==== 1950 ====
1950 New South Wales state election: Rockdale
Party	Candidate	Votes	%	±%
Labor	John McGrath	13,083	54.0	
Liberal	George McGuire	11,166	46.0	
Total formal votes		24,249	98.6	
Informal votes		340	1.4	
Turnout		24,589	94.6	
Labor hold		Swing		

=== Elections in the 1940s ===
==== 1947 ====
1947 New South Wales state election: Rockdale
Party	Candidate	Votes	%	±%
Labor	John McGrath	12,305	54.8	−1.3
Liberal	George McGuire	10,146	45.2	+13.1
Total formal votes		22,451	98.3	−0.6
Informal votes		396	1.7	+0.6
Turnout		22,847	95.4	+1.7
Labor hold		Swing	N/A	

==== 1944 ====
1944 New South Wales state election: Rockdale
Party	Candidate	Votes	%	±%
Labor	John McGrath	11,419	56.1	+0.5
Liberal Democratic	Enoch Jones	6,531	32.1	+32.1
Democratic	Henry Miller	2,184	10.7	−27.5
Independent	Thomas Whitehouse	227	1.1	+1.1
Total formal votes		20,361	96.5	−1.2
Informal votes		729	3.5	+1.2
Turnout		21,090	93.7	+0.3
Labor hold		Swing	N/A	

- Preferences were not distributed.

==== 1941 ====
1941 New South Wales state election: Rockdale
Party	Candidate	Votes	%	±%
Labor	John McGrath	10,995	55.6	
United Australia	George McGuire	7,554	38.2	
State Labor	Reginald Williams	1,222	6.2	
Total formal votes		19,771	97.7	
Informal votes		462	2.3	
Turnout		20,233	93.4	
Labor notional hold		Swing		

- Preferences were not distributed.

District recreated

==== 1930–1941 ====
District abolished

=== Elections in the 1920s ===
==== 1927 ====
1927 New South Wales state election: Rockdale
Party	Candidate	Votes	%	±%
Nationalist	Guy Arkins	7,876	55.1	
Labor	Edgar Levey	6,412	44.9	
Total formal votes		14,288	99.0	
Informal votes		149	1.0	
Turnout		14,437	89.0	
Nationalist win		(new seat)		
