= Electoral results for the district of Bass Hill =

Election results for Bass Hill, New South Wales, Australia

Bass Hill, an electoral district of the Legislative Assembly in the Australian state of New South Wales was created in 1962 and abolished in 1991.

Election	Member	Party
1962	Clarrie Earl	Labor
1965	Clarrie Earl	Labor
1968	Clarrie Earl	Labor
1971	Clarrie Earl	Labor
1973	Neville Wran	Labor
1976	Neville Wran	Labor
1978	Neville Wran	Labor
1981	Neville Wran	Labor
1984	Neville Wran	Labor
1986 by	Michael Owen	Liberal
1988	Bill Lovelee	Labor

== Election results ==
=== Elections in the 1980s ===
==== 1988 ====
1988 New South Wales state election: Bass Hill
Party	Candidate	Votes	%	±%
Labor	Bill Lovelee	14,758	50.1	−16.1
Liberal	Michael Owen	12,062	41.0	+11.8
Independent EFF	Norm Axford	1,777	6.0	+6.0
Independent	Ernest Archer	831	2.8	+2.8
Total formal votes		29,428	96.4	+0.3
Informal votes		1,095	3.6	−0.3
Turnout		30,523	95.5	
Two-party-preferred result
Labor	Bill Lovelee	15,634	54.3	−14.1
Liberal	Michael Owen	13,180	45.7	+14.1
Labor hold		Swing	−14.1	

==== 1986 by-election ====
1986 Bass Hill by-election Saturday 2 August
Party	Candidate	Votes	%	±%
Labor	Bill Lovelee	10,899	41.96	−22.17
Liberal	Michael Owen	8,646	33.28	+3.92
Independent	Jill Barber	3,209	12.35	+12.35
Democrats	Peter Carver	1,391	5.35	+5.35
Call to Australia	Elaine Nile	1,387	5.34	+5.34
Independent	Richard Mezinec	329	1.27	+1.27
Pan Ethnic Republican	John Vartanian	115	0.44	+0.44
Total formal votes		25,976	96.23	+0.15
Informal votes		1,019	3.77	−0.15
Turnout		26,995	80.76	−13.91
Two-party-preferred result
Liberal	Michael Owen	12,260	50.21	+17.5^{*}
Labor	Bill Lovelee	12,157	49.79	−17.5 ^{*}
Liberal gain from Labor		Swing	+17.5'"`UNIQ−−ref−0000001C−QINU`"'	

Labor MP Neville Wran resigned.

==== 1984 ====
1984 New South Wales state election: Bass Hill
Party	Candidate	Votes	%	±%
Labor	Neville Wran	19,432	64.1	−11.6
Liberal	Peter Swiderski	8,897	29.4	+5.1
Citizens Action	Sandor Torzsok	1,330	4.4	+4.4
Rainbow Party	Julien Droulers	642	2.1	+2.1
Total formal votes		30,301	96.1	−0.5
Informal votes		1,237	3.9	+0.5
Turnout		31,538	94.7	+1.1
Two-party-preferred result
Labor	Neville Wran		67.3	−8.4
Liberal	Peter Swiderski		32.7	+8.4
Labor hold		Swing	−8.4	

==== 1981 ====
1981 New South Wales state election: Bass Hill
Party	Candidate	Votes	%	±%
Labor	Neville Wran	22,567	75.7	−2.8
Liberal	Paul Jones	7,263	24.3	+5.3
Total formal votes		29,830	96.6	
Informal votes		1,037	3.4	
Turnout		30,867	93.6	
Labor hold		Swing	−4.0	

=== Elections in the 1970s ===
==== 1978 ====
1978 New South Wales state election: Bass Hill
Party	Candidate	Votes	%	±%
Labor	Neville Wran	23,934	78.5	+13.9
Liberal	Phillip Wearne	5,801	19.0	−16.4
Democrats	Gillian Benn	750	2.5	+2.5
Total formal votes		30,485	97.3	−0.5
Informal votes		848	2.7	+0.5
Turnout		31,333	94.3	−0.2
Two-party-preferred result
Labor	Neville Wran	24,309	79.7	+15.1
Liberal	Phillip Wearne	6,176	20.3	−15.1
Labor hold		Swing	+15.1	

==== 1976 ====
1976 New South Wales state election: Bass Hill
Party	Candidate	Votes	%	±%
Labor	Neville Wran	19,684	64.6	+3.9
Liberal	Terence Shanahan	10,788	35.4	−3.9
Total formal votes		30,472	97.8	+1.4
Informal votes		694	2.2	−1.4
Turnout		31,166	94.5	0.0
Labor hold		Swing	+3.9	

==== 1973 ====
1973 New South Wales state election: Bass Hill
Party	Candidate	Votes	%	±%
Labor	Neville Wran	17,413	60.7	−6.1
Liberal	Raymond Clark-Smith	11,277	39.3	+6.1
Total formal votes		28,690	96.4	
Informal votes		1,060	3.6	
Turnout		29,750	94.5	
Labor hold		Swing	−6.1	

==== 1971 ====
1971 New South Wales state election: Bass Hill
Party	Candidate	Votes	%	±%
Labor	Clarrie Earl	18,608	66.8	+10.4
Liberal	Doreen Ghent	9,242	33.2	−10.4
Total formal votes		27,850	97.1	
Informal votes		836	2.9	
Turnout		28,686	94.3	
Labor hold		Swing	+10.4	

=== Elections in the 1960s ===
==== 1968 ====
1968 New South Wales state election: Bass Hill
Party	Candidate	Votes	%	±%
Labor	Clarrie Earl	15,052	56.4	+0.4
Liberal	Neil Davis	11,648	43.6	+6.0
Total formal votes		26,700	96.4	
Informal votes		984	3.6	
Turnout		27,684	94.7	
Labor hold		Swing	−1.9	

==== 1965 ====
1965 New South Wales state election: Bass Hill
Party	Candidate	Votes	%	±%
Labor	Clarrie Earl	13,765	56.0	−7.1
Liberal	William Pardy	9,251	37.6	+8.4
Independent	John Sawyer	1,564	6.4	+6.4
Total formal votes		24,580	97.7	−0.3
Informal votes		574	2.3	+0.3
Turnout		25,154	94.0	+0.3
Two-party-preferred result
Labor	Clarrie Earl	14,703	59.8	−8.7
Liberal	William Pardy	9,877	40.2	+8.7
Labor hold		Swing	−8.7	

==== 1962 ====
1962 New South Wales state election: Bass Hill
Party	Candidate	Votes	%	±%
Labor	Clarrie Earl	14,307	63.1	−2.3
Liberal	William Pardy	6,621	29.2	−5.4
Independent	Isaac Denley	1,755	7.7	+7.7
Total formal votes		22,683	98.0	
Informal votes		459	2.0	
Turnout		23,142	93.7	
Two-party-preferred result
Labor	Clarrie Earl	15,535	68.5	+3.1
Liberal	William Pardy	7,148	31.5	−3.1
Labor hold		Swing	+3.1	

Bass Hill was a new seat that was notionally a safe Labor seat.
