= 1986 Bass Hill state by-election =

Election result for Bass Hill, New South Wales, Australia

A by-election was held for the New South Wales Legislative Assembly seat of Bass Hill on 2 August 1986. The by-election was triggered by the resignation of sitting Labor MP Neville Wran. It was won by Liberal candidate Michael Owen.

The Bass Hill by-election was held the same day as the Rockdale by-election.

== Background ==
Neville Wran resigned as Premier of New South Wales after more than 10 years in office. At the time, Wran held the record for the longest uninterrupted stint as NSW Premier. In addition to resigning as Premier, Wran also resigned his seat in the Legislative Assembly, necessitating a by-election to fill the vacancy.

== Result ==
Bass Hill was lost by the Labor Party for the only time in the history of the district. In a very close result, Liberal Party candidate Michael Owen won the contest by 103 votes after the distribution of preferences.

1986 Bass Hill by-election]] Saturday 2 August
Party	Candidate	Votes	%	±%
Labor	Bill Lovelee	10,899	41.96	−22.17
Liberal	Michael Owen	8,646	33.28	+3.92
Independent	Jill Barber	3,209	12.35	+12.35
Democrats	Peter Carver	1,391	5.35	+5.35
Call to Australia	Elaine Nile	1,387	5.34	+5.34
Independent	Richard Mezinec	329	1.27	+1.27
Pan Ethnic Republican	John Vartanian	115	0.44	+0.44
Total formal votes		25,976	96.23	+0.15
Informal votes		1,019	3.77	−0.15
Turnout		26,995	80.76	−13.91
Two-party-preferred result
Liberal	Michael Owen	12,260	50.21	+17.5^{*}
Labor	Bill Lovelee	12,157	49.79	−17.5 ^{*}
Liberal gain from Labor		Swing	+17.5	

Since the two-party preferred count was not conducted for Bass Hill in 1984, the two party preferred swing at the by-election cannot be calculated precisely. ABC election analyst Antony Green estimates a two party preferred swing of 17.5% towards the Liberal Party.

== See also ==
- Electoral results for the district of Bass Hill
- List of New South Wales state by-elections
