= 1986 Rockdale state by-election =

Election result for Rockdale, New South Wales, Australia

A by-election was held for the New South Wales Legislative Assembly seat of Rockdale on 2 August 1986. It was triggered by the resignation of sitting Labor MP Brian Bannon. The by-election was won by Labor candidate and Premier Barrie Unsworth.

The Rockdale by-election was held the same day as the Bass Hill by-election.

== Background ==
Barrie Unsworth had become Premier of New South Wales on 4 July 1986, by virtue of succeeding Neville Wran as parliamentary leader of the New South Wales Labor Party. Wran resigned the premiership after more than 10 years in the role. At that time, Unsworth was a member of the Legislative Council, whereas premiers are typically members of the Legislative Assembly. Rockdale MP Brian Bannon resigned his seat on 3 July 1986, officially to accept a government job as Chairman of the Homebush States Sports Centre Trust, but in reality to create a vacancy for Unsworth to fill.

== Results ==
Barrie Unsworth's transition from the upper house to the lower house was a very close run thing. Whilst Labor had held Rockdale at all times since the district's re-creation in 1941, it only barely retained the seat at the by-election. Labor suffered a large drop in its vote compared with the 1984 state election. In the end, Unsworth prevailed by only 54 votes after the distribution of preferences.

1986 Rockdale by-election Saturday 2 August
Party	Candidate	Votes	%	±%
Labor	Barrie Unsworth	11,251	46.17	−17.10
Liberal	Bob Gemmell	9,896	40.61	+6.53
Independent	James McLean	1,720	7.06	+7.06
Socialist Workers	Valmai Frances Edwards	725	2.98	+2.98
Independent	John Badman	375	1.54	+1.54
Independent	Charles Bellchambers	334	1.37	−1.28
Uninflated Movement	Nadar Ponnuswamy	67	0.27	+0.27
Total formal votes		24,368	96.50	−0.21
Informal votes		885	3.50	+0.21
Turnout		25,253	79.59	−13.17
Two-party-preferred result
Labor	Barrie Unsworth	11,946	50.11	−14.5 (Note: Since the two-party preferred count was not conducted for Rockdale in 1984, the two party preferred swing at the by-election cannot be calculated precisely. ABC election analyst Antony Green estimates a two party preferred swing of 14.5% against the Labor Party.)
Liberal	Bob Gemmell	11,892	49.89	+14.5
Labor hold		Swing	−14.5	

== See also ==
- Electoral results for the district of Rockdale
- List of New South Wales state by-elections
