= 1973 New South Wales Labor Party leadership spill =

- 3 December 1973
- Leadership spill
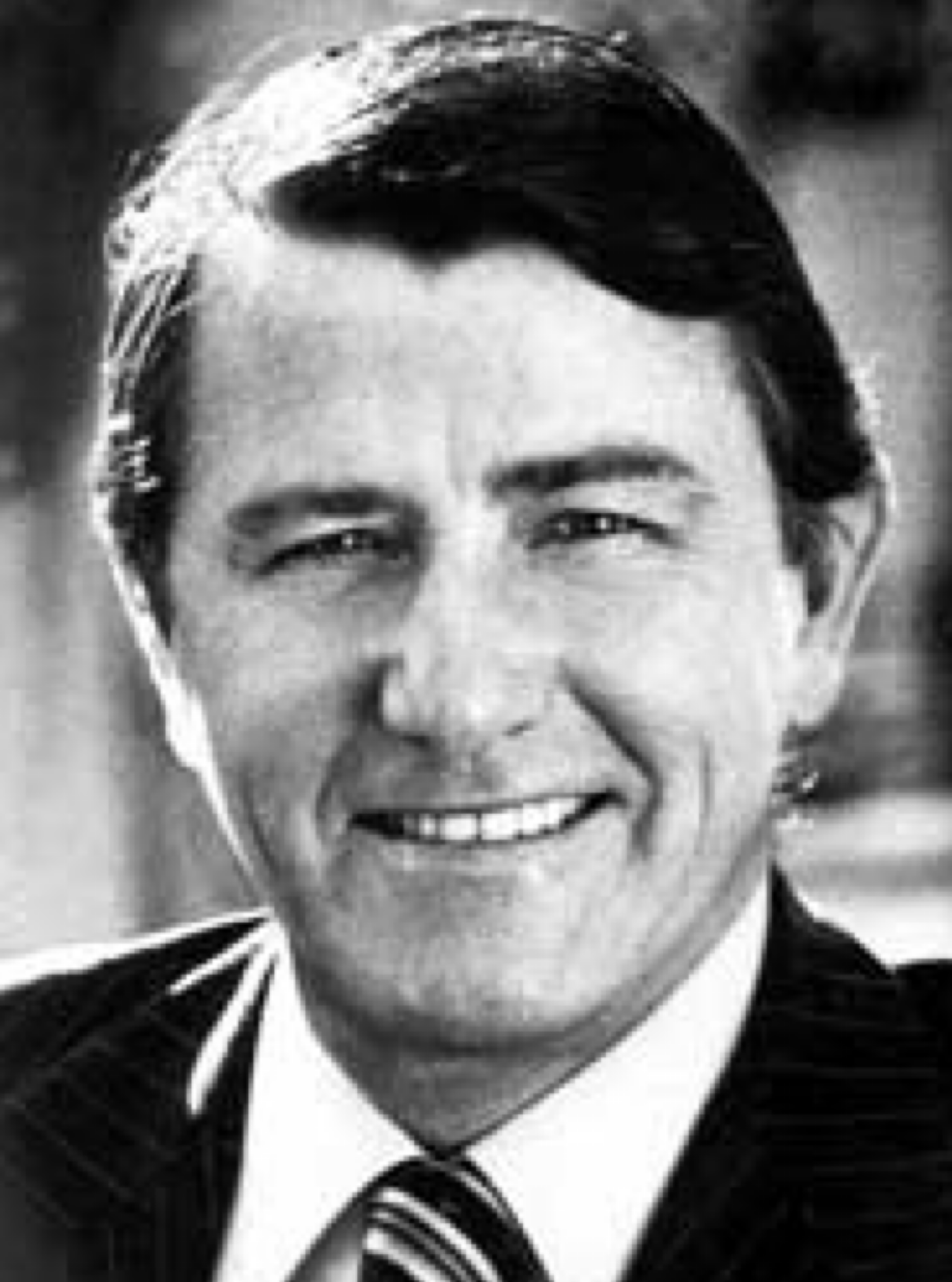

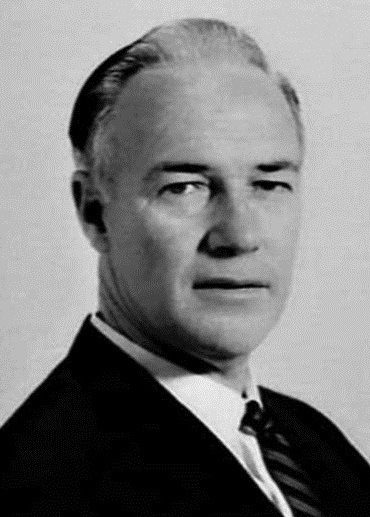

Candidate	Neville Wran	Pat Hills	Kevin Stewart
Caucus vote	18	17	9
After preferences	22	22	eliminated
Electorate	Bass Hill	Phillip	Canterbury
Faction	Unaligned	Right	Right
Leader before election
Pat Hills
Elected Leader
Neville Wran
- Deputy leadership spill

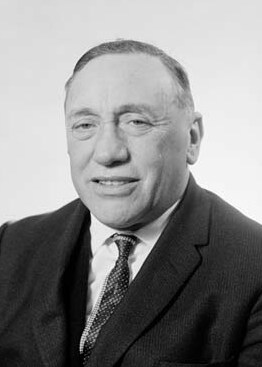

Candidate	Jack Ferguson	Syd Einfeld	Peter Cox
Caucus vote	unknown	unknown	unknown
After preferences	23	21	eliminated
Electorate	Bass Hill	Waverley	Auburn
Faction	Left
Deputy before election
Syd Einfeld
Elected Deputy
Jack Ferguson

The 1973 New South Wales Labor Party leadership spill was held on 3 December 1973 to elect the leader of the New South Wales Labor Party and, ex officio, Leader of the Opposition.

Incumbent leader Pat Hills, who had led Labor to a defeat at the state election on 17 November 1973, was defeated by Neville Wran. Wran had been elected to the seat of Bass Hill at the state election, having previously served as a member of the Legislative Council.

Wran tied with Hills on 22 votes each after the supporters of third-placed candidate Kevin Stewart had their preferences distributed. However, as Wran had won the most first preference votes, he was elected leader. He was factionally unaligned, with his support coming from MPs in both the Left and Right factions.

At the next state election in 1976, Wran led Labor to a narrow victory over the Liberal-National Coalition government. He led the party to further victories in 1978, 1981 and 1984, before resigning as premier in 1986.

== Candidates ==
=== Leader ===
==== Declared ====
Candidate	Electorate	Faction	Announced
Pat Hills	Phillip	Right	26 November 1973
Kevin Stewart	Canterbury	Right	27 November 1973
Neville Wran	Bass Hill	Unaligned	20 November 1973

==== Declined ====
Candidate	Electorate	Faction	Declined
Harry Jensen	Munmorah		27 November 1973

=== Deputy leader ===
==== Declared ====
Candidate	Electorate	Faction	Announced
Peter Cox	Auburn		27 November 1973
Syd Einfeld	Waverley		November 1973
Jack Ferguson	Merrylands	Left	November 1973
