= Craig Mahoney =

Psychologist and academic administrator

- Education: Queen's University of Belfast
- Occupation: Professor

Craig Mahoney is an Australian chartered psychologist.

Mahoney grew up on a farm outside Ulverstone Tasmania and attended Ulverstone High School and then the Tasmanian College of Advanced Education (now part of the University of Tasmania. After training and working as a teacher for six years he moved to the UK to pursue a Masters degree at the University of Birmingham and later a PhD at the Queen's University of Belfast. Professor Mahoney was the Vice-Chancellor of the University of West of Scotland from August 2013 until February 2022, and then spent six months as Vice-Chancellor of the University of Law.

== Education ==
Mahoney holds a bachelor's degree in Chemistry and Mathematics from the University of Tasmania, a master's degree from the University of Birmingham, and a Doctor of Philosophy from Queen University Belfast.

== Career ==
Mahoney was previously the deputy Vice Chancellor at Northumbria University, a dean of the school of sport, performing arts and leisure at Wolverhampton University. He was the chief executive of the higher education academy. He is a chartered psychologist and an associate fellow of the British Psychological Society.
