= Tasmanian University Student Association =

Coordinates: 42°54′11.6″S 147°19′27.1″E

- Established: 1899
- Institution: University of Tasmania
- Location: 1 Churchill Avenue, Sandy Bay, Hobart TAS 7005
- Members: c. 35,000+
- Website: https://www.tusa.org.au

Board of Management
- Chair: Danny Sutton
- Board Member: Rikki Mawad, Robert Meredith, Jennifer Newman, Tyson Wienker, Belinda Williams, Sophie Crothers, Liam McLaren, Alex Lamont

State Council
- President: Liam McLaren
- Equity President: Trenton Hoare
- Education President (Undergraduate): Zac Sabapathy
- Education President (Postgraduate): Nousheen Naz
- Southern Campus President: Stella Maddock
- Northern Campus President: Ryan Stanaway
- Cradle Coast Campus President: Alec Lamont
- Rozelle Campus President: Lucy Castelletti

The Tasmanian University Student Association (TUSA), formerly known as Tasmania University Union (TUU), is the peak body of student representation for tertiary students attending the University of Tasmania and was established in 1899.

The Student Association is a student-led collective that is dedicated to two core principles: student leadership, and the student community.

== Structure ==
The TUSA is governed by the State Council which is made up of student leaders elected by University of Tasmania students and the Board of Management (BoM).

=== State Council ===
The State Council is the peak statewide body constituted to deal with student representation and activities. This includes representing students in university decision-making processes and forums, developing and supporting student networks, assisting the university to consult with students, providing a voice for students to internal and external stakeholders, and represent student issues to the wider community. The State Council consists of:

- President
- Equity President
- Two Education Presidents (Undergraduate and Postgraduate)
- Four Campus Presidents (Southern, Northern, Cradle Coast, and Rozelle)

=== Board of Management ===
The BoM is responsible for setting the strategy and direction of the TUSA. The State Council may make recommendations to the BoM, but the BoM is not bound to these recommendations. It consists of:

- The State President
- The Deputy President
- The outgoing State President
- Two positions appointed by the University (by reason of their skills and expertise)
- The chair appointed by the university (in a non-voting capacity, but which may make a casting vote)

The TUSA also employs staff to provide administrative services and professional assistance for University of Tasmania students, such as student advocates, contact staff, marketing, operations and accounts. The staff are headed by the chief executive officer of the TUSA.

== Services ==
The TUSA provides a wide range of services to students. These services currently include:

- Lobbying and representation on issues important to students,
- Independent support and advocacy,
- Financial support and counselling,
- Social connection through TUSA-affiliated Clubs and Societies, and Student led events.
- Facilities such as Clubs & Societies meeting rooms, kitchen, and lounge areas.\
- Safe spaces and Women’s Spaces, Queer Spaces, and Parenting Rooms on the Sandy Bay Campus, and
- Publishing student-produced media, such as the Togatus.

== Clubs and societies ==
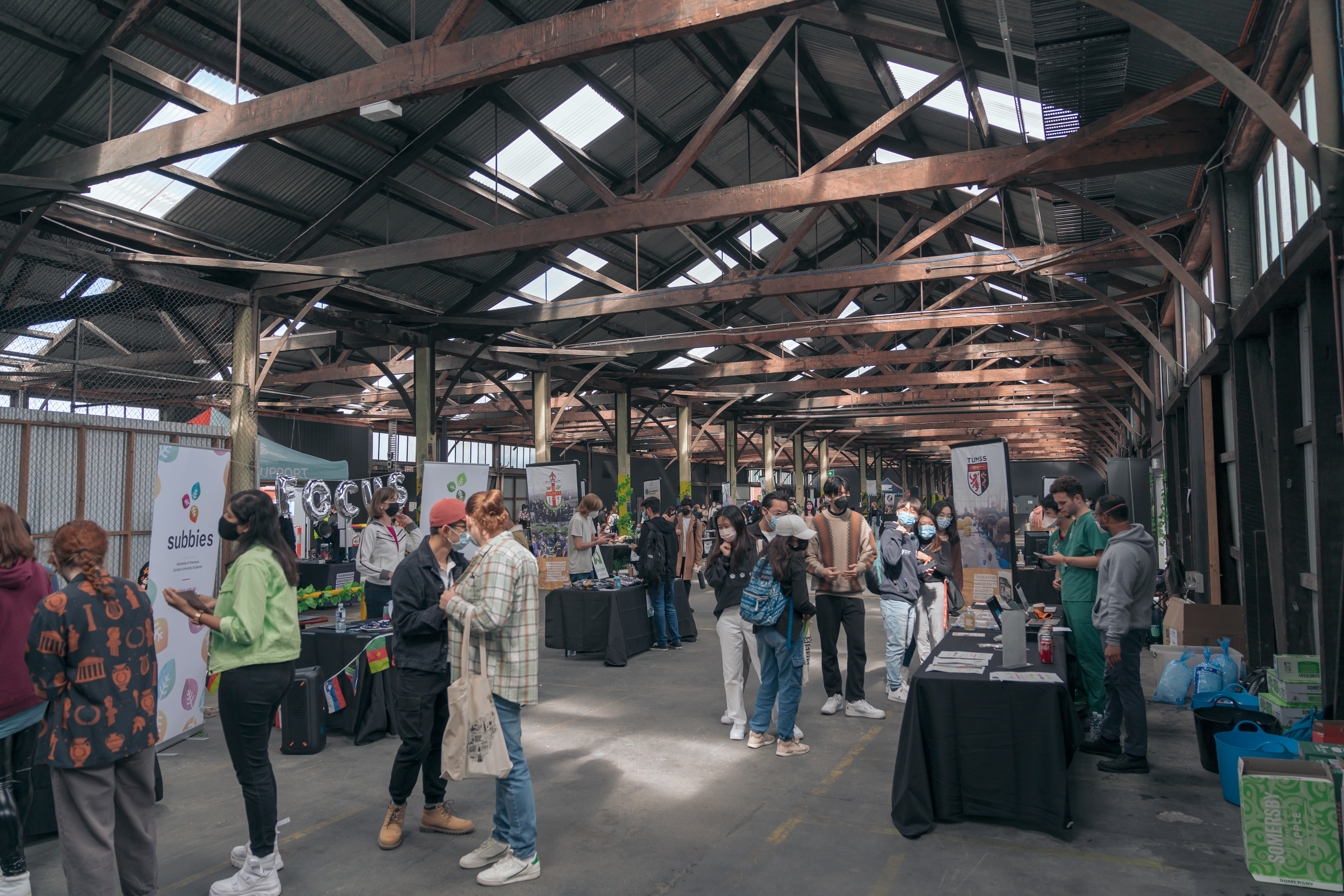
TUSA's Clubs and Societies Day 2022 at The Goods Shed, Hobart

The vast majority of student sports, social, and faculty-based clubs and societies at the University of Tasmania are affiliated to the TUSA. These clubs and societies provide an important aspect of campus culture, running a variety of activities including sports, social, careers, cultural, and charitable events throughout the year. Some societies have their membership based in specific faculties, such as the Tasmanian University Law Society and Tasmanian University Medical Students Society. Others are more special interest-based, such as the Bushwalking Society and PLOT Theatre Society. University-based sports clubs include University of Tasmania Cricket Club, University of Tasmania Rugby Union Club, University of Tasmania Soccer Club, which participate in various statewide sports rosters. Tasmania's three major political parties (Australian Labor Party, Liberal Party of Australia, and the Australian Greens) all have student clubs on campus. The Student Legal Service, a student-run legal advice programme, also operates under the TUSA.

== Campus media ==
Togatus is the independent student magazine at UTAS, and has been published relatively consistently since 1931 when it replaced Platypus, the first student newspaper. The magazine contains in-depth articles, student opinion pieces, and interviews.

== History ==
The Tasmanian University Student Association essentially began as a social club for the 35 students that made up the University of Tasmania. Today it represents all of the approximately 35,000 students enrolled at the university.

=== Tasmania University Union logo ===
The original TUU logo was probably adopted in the 1920s, with the motto 'In Unitatem UniTas' which can be interpreted as 'The University of Tasmania working towards unity'. In the 1940s, the Union began using the new University of Tasmania logo with rampant lion.

In the early 1990s, the TUU ran a competition for a new logo for the Tasmania University Logo. The winning student design remains in use today. The classical pillar represents knowledge on a solid footing "to show the Union's links with academic tradition, but drawn in a modern way to emphasis its contemporary outlook".

=== 1899–1930: early years ===
The TUU was formed by students in 1899, 6 years after lectures began at the University of Tasmania. The initial purpose of the Union was to facilitate social interaction between students and, organise sporting activities and debating. Membership was optional. The development of clubs and societies such as the Law Students Association was integral to the TUU from its early days, with seventeen clubs and societies already active within the small student population in the 1920s. The Union produced its first magazine, "Platypus" in 1914. The TUU also began to organise dances and balls, plays and the rowdy Mock Commem Processions in its early years.

The progressive growth in the TUU and its activities were put on hold by the outbreak of World War I, as students left to join the armed forces. Activities declined significantly in this period; and no committee was named in 1920.

In the early 1920s, the University Council made partial membership fees compulsory for students. This enabled the TUU to regain strength, and begin to field teams in the recently instituted Australian inter-varsity sporting competitions. In 1930, full membership was made compulsory.

The Union Committee became the formal Student Representative Council in 1925 under a Constitutional change.

=== 1931–1939: settling in ===
In the mid to late 1930s, the Union began to flourish again as the problems of the war and the Great Depression finally began to fade. In 1937 the Tasmania University Union joined the new National Union of Students, and successfully engaged in national campaigns, such as pushing for student representation on university decision-making bodies The TUU became increasingly well established at the University of Tasmania, organising student life and representing students to the University and the wider community. The TUU took on its first paid employee, a part-time professional secretary, in 1939 to help with the administration of the growing Union and its increasing activities.

As Platypus had become defunct, the Union started Togatus in 1931, which was then a fortnightly student news and opinion paper.

=== 1940–1954: resilience ===
As World War II broke out, the Tasmania University Union fell into decline again, cancelling many of its activities and donating the membership fees of remaining students to the Australian Government for the war effort. The TUU pressed on however, updating the Constitution again for a fully elected SRC, introducing a formal budget process, printing the first student handbook, and electing its first female president Cynthia Johnson in 1941. The first party political student clubs were also formed during the war.

As the war ended, student numbers increased dramatically and the university began its gradual move from the Hobart Domain to Sandy Bay. Over the next decade, the TUU began Orientation Week ('O-Week'), started a book stall, organised more student spaces and a canteen, and began to gain permanent sporting facilities; as well as establishing the theatre company Old Nick, which continues independently today.

=== 1954–1973: growth ===
In the early 1950s, the TUU joined with academic staff against the University Council, resulting in a Royal Commission into the University. The Commission upheld the claims against the University about unfit working conditions and poor facilities. The university then hastened its move to the new Sandy Bay Campus with increased Commonwealth funding. At the same time, the Union secured dollar-for-dollar state government support to build the Union Building at Sandy Bay, completed in 1959. Services introduced with the building included the Refectory ('the Ref'), a 'mixed' shop, gown hire, a bank and hairdresser. The Union continued to construct extensions to the building, and add more services over the following years, becoming "a large business venture".

As the Union settled into its expanded commercial role, it also introduced new annual events such as the first Scav Hunt in 1962 (which became notorious over the years, with the 'kidnapping' of local personalities and buses); and the Student Representatives began to look into wider student issues such as indigenous disadvantage, student living conditions, and the environment. Protests originating from the Union Building and moving into the city of Hobart, regarding the Vietnam War, Apartheid in South Africa and many other issues became common in the 1960s and 1970s. The SRC also became more active in surveying students and using the results to pressure for change in faculty and university processes and structures.

=== 1974–1980: disenchantment ===
The Union's situation disintegrated through the late 1970s. A poor national economy created opposition to raising the compulsory Union fee, alongside issues of mismanagement within the TUU led to a worsening financial position. Trading ventures began to run at a loss, there were allegations of corruption, the SRC suffered from in-fighting and frequent turnover, and for six consecutive years the TUU Annual General Meetings (AGMs) failed due to lack of quorum from the student body. Inexperience and intense party political competition around the SRC was especially damaging around 1976, with the Union technically bankrupt by the end of 1977; although it returned to profit in 1978 under a new president. the period of 1976 to 1977, during the presidency of Michael (Mick) Munday, who was twice elected was in fact one of the most progressive eras of the union. After this period student activism declined, and the student body also voted to secede from the National Union of Students in 1979.

=== 1980–2000: rolling along ===
In the early 1980s, the TUU underwent significant structural change through a new Constitution, and began to look more like it does today. The Board of Management (with a student majority) was instituted to manage the financial and trading interests of the Union, leaving the SRC to concentrate on education, welfare, activities and publications. By the mid-1980s, the Union had turned around to boast "the best facilities and the lowers fees in Australia. All trading ventures ran at a profit...and [the Activities Council] became the major music promoter in Tasmania". The Union campaigned on issues like Commonwealth tertiary education funding, student allowances, and against the introduction of Voluntary Student Unionism. The Union's services continued to expand, especially TUU student housing. The SRC also gained greatly increased representation on University committees and won a campaign for anonymity in exams.

In the mid to late 1980s, some of the TUU's commercial ventures returned to loss and the union fee was increased against much opposition. However, the new Executive Officer from 1989 increased accountability and efficiency measures, returning financial stability and going on to win a Businesswoman of the Year Award. The Union's second ever female president was elected at the end of the decade.

As the university grew and diversified, the TUU introduced SRC positions like the satellite campus representatives, sexuality and environment officers; as well as the Postgraduate Council. Togatus became more of a general magazine than a student newspaper around this time. The TUU continued to campaign against cuts to tertiary education funding and VSU, and changes to university courses and facilities - but was less successful over the long term, especially with a less activist student population than in the past .

The Tasmania University Union became an incorporated entity in 1991

=== Merger with the Student Association Incorporated ===
The Student Association Incorporated was a separate student union serving the Launceston and Burnie campuses before 1 April 2008, when it merged with the Tasmania University Union.

=== Recent history ===
As it has throughout its history, the TUU has organised campaigns around many divisive issues, including university restructures, student welfare issues, the introduction of voluntary student unionism in 2006, and the use of compulsory student fees collected under the Higher Education Legislation Amendment (Student Services and Amenities) Act in 2012.

In 2011, the bulk of the commercial operations (including catering, retail, and housing services) offered on campus by the TUU were sold to the University. At the time, this decision by the BoM to sell the commercial assets was viewed as controversial, and reinvigorated student interest in the TUU and its operations. In light of these significant changes to the Union, the TUU has commenced a process of constitutional review in 2012.

In 2017, the Union began a strategic review process that would lead to the most significant overhaul of the TUU in nearly a decade. In March 2018, Togatus published a special edition, reporting on the findings and recommendations of the review. The review called for sweeping reform of the Union’s structure and services. A series of systemic structural issues within the TUU were identified, with the review concluding that the organisation is not transparent, and fails to represent students.

Following a strategic review, significant reforms for the organisation were announced. Togatus reported the number of student representative positions within the existing structure of the TUU would be almost halved from 49 to 27, with the Education and Postgraduate councils dissolved and a new student council developed, formed of representatives from each of the University of Tasmania’s (UTas) course areas. The Tasmania University Student Council (TUSC) was founded to balance out the reduction of positions and better convey academic concerns from students.

=== 2020–current: COVID-19 and name change ===
- During the COVID-19 pandemic, the TUSA supported students financially, and with strong representation to the university of student needs and interests. Financial aid was increased to students experiencing hardship, and academic guidelines were relaxed to accommodate for a change never before seen by the student body.
- In 2021, a significant overhaul of TUSA strategy, operation and structure culminated in the decision to change the name of the organisation from the Tasmania University Union to the Tasmanian University Student Association. This decision followed several years of work aimed at overhauling processes in an effort to improve representation, advocacy and support for students. The new name was decided upon following extensive student consultation as a way to better represent the diverse student population at UTAS.

== Notable office-bearers ==
- Eric Abetz
- Guy Barnett
- Neal Blewett
- David Bushby
- Richard Flanagan
- Duncan Kerr
- Pierre Slicer, retired former member of the Supreme Court of Tasmania
