= Togatus =

Student media at the University of Tasmania

- Your Student Media
- The cover of Togatus Edition 3, 2019
- Type: Student publication
- Format: Newspaper
- School: University of Tasmania
- Owner: Tasmania University Union
- Editor-in-chief: Ineka Leffler
- Deputy editor: Ella Vanderzwan
- Staff writers: Amalie Cox Erin Coull Jasmine Jones
- Founded: 1931
- Headquarters: Sandy Bay
- City: Hobart, Tasmania, Australia
- Website: www.togatus.com.au

Togatus is the independent student media at the University of Tasmania and is produced for students, by students. Published by the Tasmania University Union since 1931, Togatus produces four print editions each year and occasionally features student news on its website.

Togatus aims to reflect the diversity of students in the University of Tasmania community. Students are encouraged to engage with the publication and to submit work including news reports, opinion pieces, creative writing, poetry, photography, design and illustration.

Following a number of years of infrequent publication, Togatus returned in 2009 with the then Premier of Tasmania, David Bartlett, telling the Examiner (Tasmania) the student publication was an important part of university life, a place where ideas could be debated.

Notable editors have included Charles Wooley, Michael Hodgman and Kevin Bonham. Unlike many other student publications at Australian universities, the editorial team of Togatus is not elected.

Togatus replaced the original union publication, "Platypus", in 1931.
