= Australian Liberal Students' Federation =

Australian student political organisation

- President: Cooper Bates
- Vice President: Abbey Dawson
- Treasurer: Krish Nair
- Founded: 26 August 1948; 78 years ago
- Membership: >2000
- Ideology: Liberal conservatism
- Position: Centre-right to right-wing
- Mother party: Liberal Party of Australia
- International affiliation: International Young Democrat Union
- Magazine: Protégé
- Website: www.alsf.org.au

The Australian Liberal Students' Federation (ALSF) is an Australian students' political organisation. Founded in 1948, the ALSF carries similar ideology to the Liberal Party of Australia. The Federation works closely with the Liberal Party, however it is an independent organisation that pursues its own policy agenda.

The Federation works to promote Liberal beliefs on campus, facilitates communication amongst individual clubs and assists in co-ordinating national Liberal Student campaigns. The ALSF is organised as a Federation with events, policy and elections taking place at a club level, as well as a federal executive and delegate system to elect a national executive, platform and strategic direction. The ALSF is a member of the International Young Democrat Union.

== Organisation ==
The Federation was formed on the 26th of August 1948 in Melbourne with delegates representing University Liberal clubs from each state, with the exception of Queensland, meeting in a three-day conference. Originally named the Australian Universities' Liberal Federation (AULF), the Federations' first council moved to encourage free enterprise as part of its policy platform and decided its first national campaign would target Socialism and Communism in Australian universities.

The Federation is not formally affiliated with the Liberal Party, although is invited as an official observer to the parties annual Federal Council. Many of the individual Federations' affiliated Liberal Clubs pre-date the existence of the Liberal Party itself including the Melbourne University Liberal Club founded in 1925, the Sydney University Liberal Club in 1933, the University of Western Australia Liberal Club in 1944, and the University of Tasmania Liberal Club in 1945.

=== Federal Council ===
The Federation hosts an annual Federal Council during the July Universities Australia common vacation week. The council historically is hosted by an affiliated Club in a different Australian capital city each year. Clubs are required to submit affiliations to the Federations' accreditation committee in the lead up to the Council and elect delegates to represent and vote on the Clubs behalf.

In addition to University Liberal clubs, state bodies also exist, including the Victorian Liberal Students' Association and the Western Australian Union of Liberal Students.

The Council proceedings include guest speakers, debate over the policy platform, workshops and discussion on the campaigns of individual clubs and the Federation as well as social events including a gala dinner. The formal proceedings of the Council include the organisations AGM in which the election of officers takes place. The Federation has eight elected officers including the President, the Vice-President, the Secretary, the Treasurer, the Policy Director, the Communications Director, the Campaigns Director, and the Immediate Past President, who is supported by an Executive made up of State and Territory representatives.

== National Union of Students ==
The Australian Liberal Students' Federation has had a long history of engagement and influence in national student bodies since its inception, and held numerous office bearer positions in the National Union of Australian University Students (NUAUS) in the 1950s and 1960s. By the 1970s, however, Liberal students became increasingly disillusioned with student representatives' support for what they saw as radical fringe elements mostly operating in foreign countries, "many of them allegedly engaged either in terrorist activities or as front-line supporters of authoritarian regimes". It said that "Instead of properly performing its core role as an advocate for student interests and a provider of student services it became hostage to extremist views more interested in international affairs than domestic education policies". "The AUS folded in 1984 after a lengthy campaign by the Australian Liberal Students’ Federation, the Fraser Government and state Liberal Governments to destroy it."

The ALSF is one of the groups within the National Union of Students (NUS) organisation. Its central policy platform is the principle of Voluntary Student Unionism (VSU) and it supports, and had input into, the reforms to Australian higher education introduced by Brendan Nelson (former minister for education, science and training, and former leader of the opposition). The ALSF supports increased deregulation of the tertiary sector, and, particularly with the implementation of VSU, presents itself as being an advocate for freedom of choice and freedom of association within universities. However, the Australian Universities Liberal Clubs (AULC), the precursor body to ALSF had for many years generally supported compulsory student unionism. After a fierce contest, this policy was changed in 1976 by a group led by Julian Glynn (then president of the Adelaide University Liberal Club), who became ALSF president in 1977 on a platform of opposing purported communist domination of student politics and support for VSU. His main supporters were Abetz, Abbott and Simon Withers (son of former senator Reg Withers), all of whom were Liberal Student Club presidents at the time.

The ALSF currently have one member on NUS national executive: Clark Cooley, Tasmanian State Branch President (University of Tasmania). At the 2012 National Conference Claire Chandler (University of Tasmania) was elected President of the Tasmanian branch of NUS. Both ALSF and the National Labor Students (NLS) had won 3 delegates each of the 6 that represent Tasmania, following a coin toss Chandler was elected. It was the second time in the history of NUS that a Liberal student has been elected as a State President. Joshua Young (University of Queensland) held the position of Queensland State Branch President in 2009.

Measured by positions elected, 2012 is to date, the most successful conference. ALSF delegates were elected across Five State Branches, in addition to those listed above. Christian Street (University of Tasmania), Charley Daniel (University of Melbourne) and Mark Briers (Swinburne University) are credited with this success.

== ALSF in the media ==
During the 2004 NUS conference, a number of Liberal NUS delegates were condemned after they interrupted the traditional indigenous Australian welcome-to-country ceremony by singing 'God Save the Queen' over the top of it.

In July 2006, the Young Liberal Movement were the subject of controversy after the ABC's Lateline program aired footage from the 2005 National Union of Students' conference in Ballarat. The video included Liberal students chanting "We're racist, we're sexist, we're homophobic". The president of the New South Wales Young Liberals released a statement condemning the outbursts, while the Queensland division of the Young Liberals said that although one prominent Young Liberal member was involved, the students were delegates elected by their university's student body; as such, they were members of the Australian Liberal Students' Federation.

During a conference for Liberals in July 2008 in Canberra, about 40 university students from the ALSF — some of them Young Liberals, were thrown out and banned from a youth hostel after an all night drinking rampage and disruptive behaviour, including some of them being caught having sex in the hostel.

In October 2012, during a Sydney University Liberal Club function, Alan Jones spoke concerning the death of Prime Minister Julia Gillard's father, John. Jones said that Mr Gillard had "died of shame to think that his daughter told lies every time she stood for parliament". Jones' speech was secretly recorded by a News Limited journalist.

In April 2017, it was revealed that Australian Liberal Students Federation past president and President of the Melbourne University Liberal Club, Xavier Boffa, had told a female member of the club that she was excluded from a club event because "a couple of the guys were a bit uncomfortable about inviting a chick".

In October 2017, Mr Boffa became the subject of a police complaint and an internal university enquiry after he was allegedly involved in an altercation with the same woman in the aftermath of a heated club meeting. It was also alleged that he assaulted another male club member from an opposing faction.

In July 2019, Xavier Boffa was accused of assault by Melbourne University Liberal Club member Benedict Kusay over an alleged incident in a bar in Adelaide at the annual general meeting of the Australian Liberal Student Federation. Boffa was arrested the next day and released on bail. Despite some Liberal Party members calling for Boffa's membership to be terminated or suspended, no action was taken pending the court date. Boffa was later found not guilty by the Adelaide Magistrates' Court.

== Notable alumni ==
The organisation and its club affiliates have produced many notable alumni, including journalists, business leaders, politicians, and legal professionals. For the past 50 years, there has been an ALSF alumni member in each Liberal Government Federal Cabinet while the four most recent Liberal Prime Ministers as well as a number of Federal and State Members of Parliament have been alumni of the organisation.

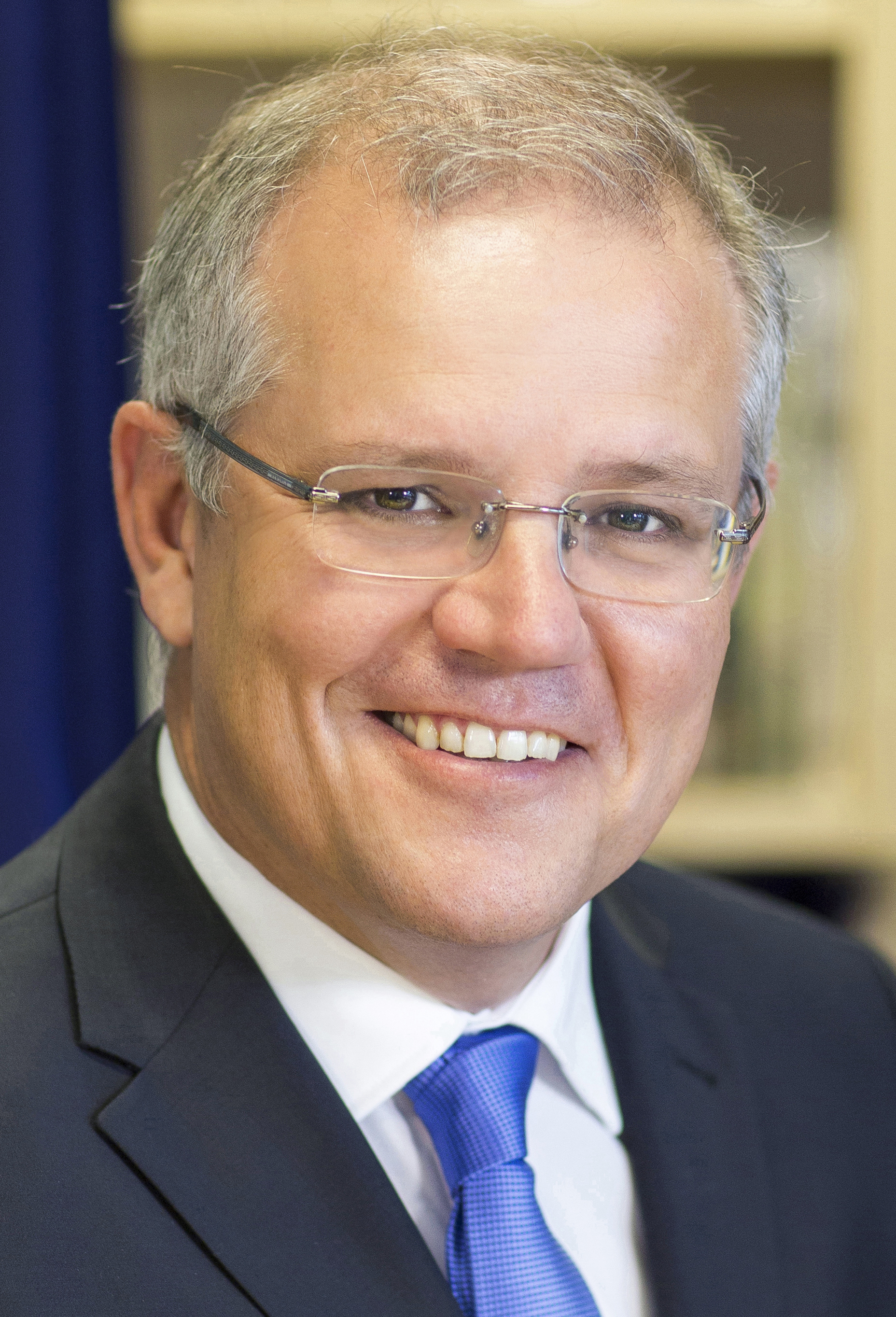
Scott Morrison, Former Prime Minister of Australia

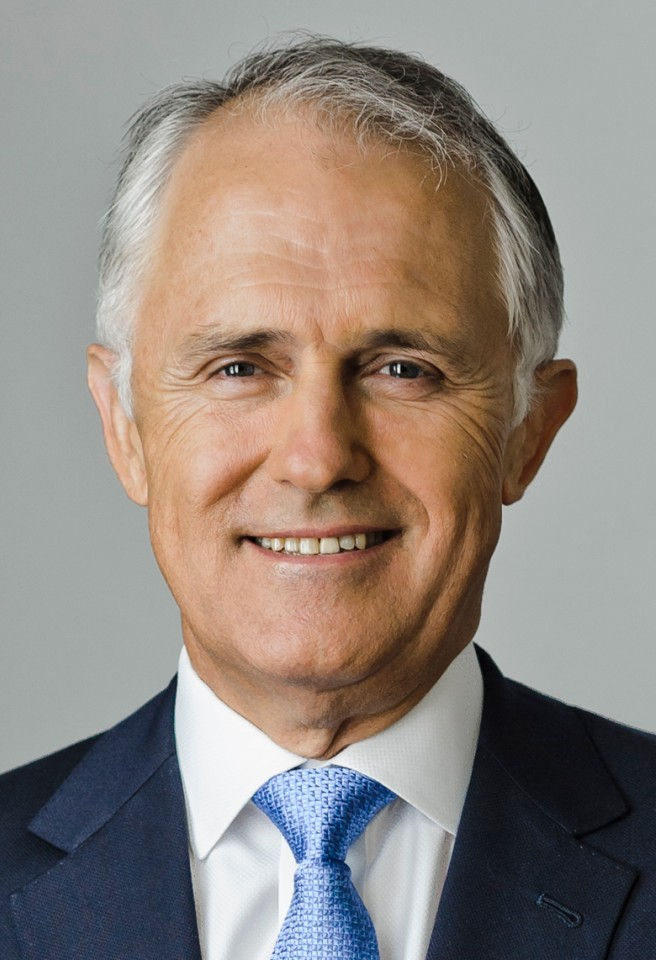
Malcolm Turnbull, Former Prime Minister

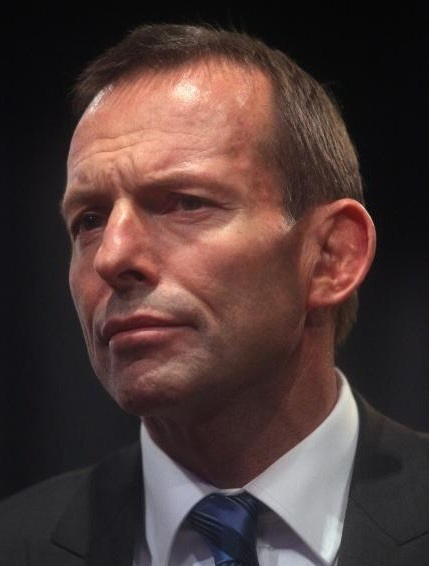
Tony Abbott, Former Prime Minister and Member for Warringah

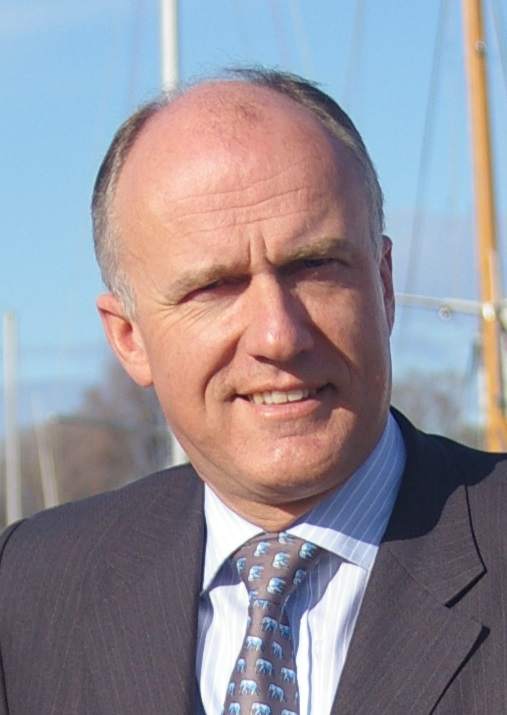
Eric Abetz, Senator and former Leader of the Government in the Senate

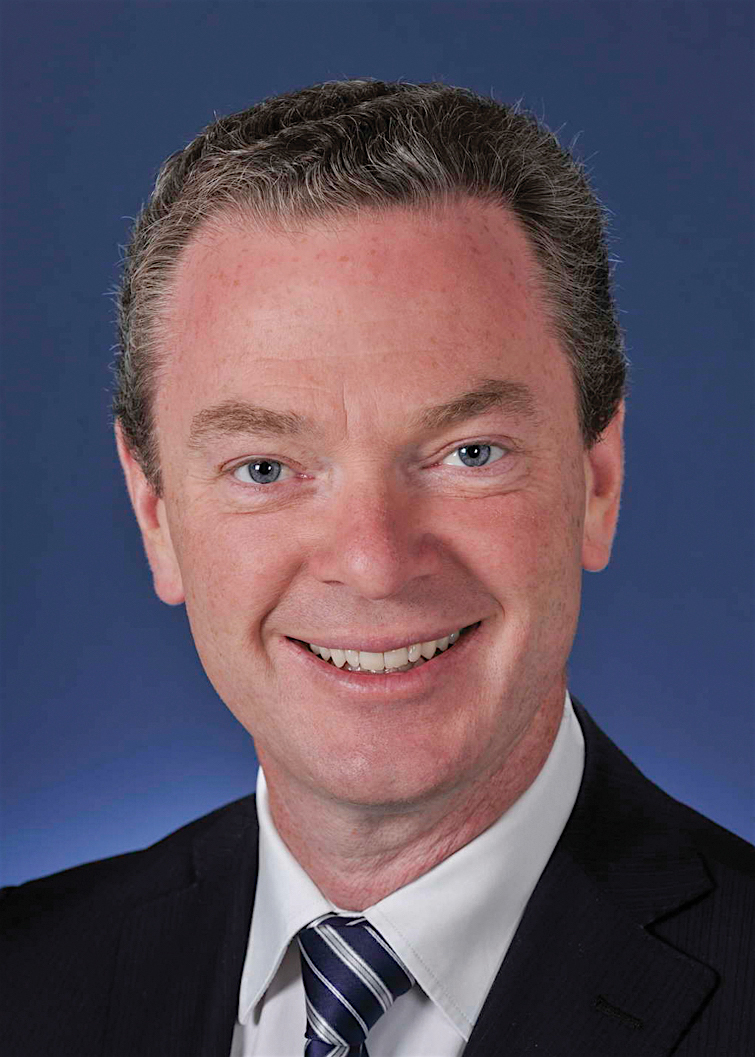
Christopher Pyne, Former Leader of the House and Minister for Defence Industry

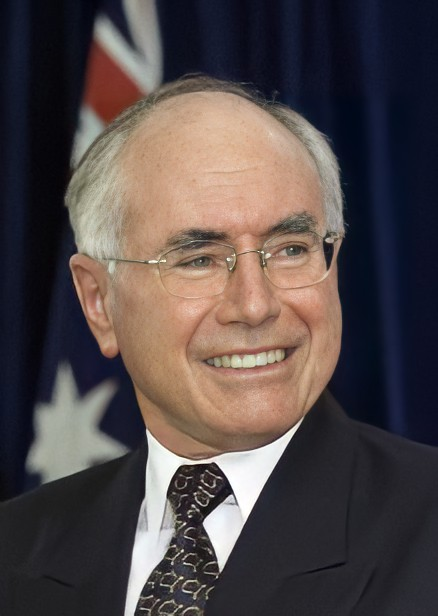
John Howard, Former Prime Minister

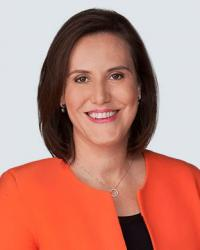
Kelly O'Dwyer, Minister for Revenue and Financial Services, Minister for Women, Member for Higgins

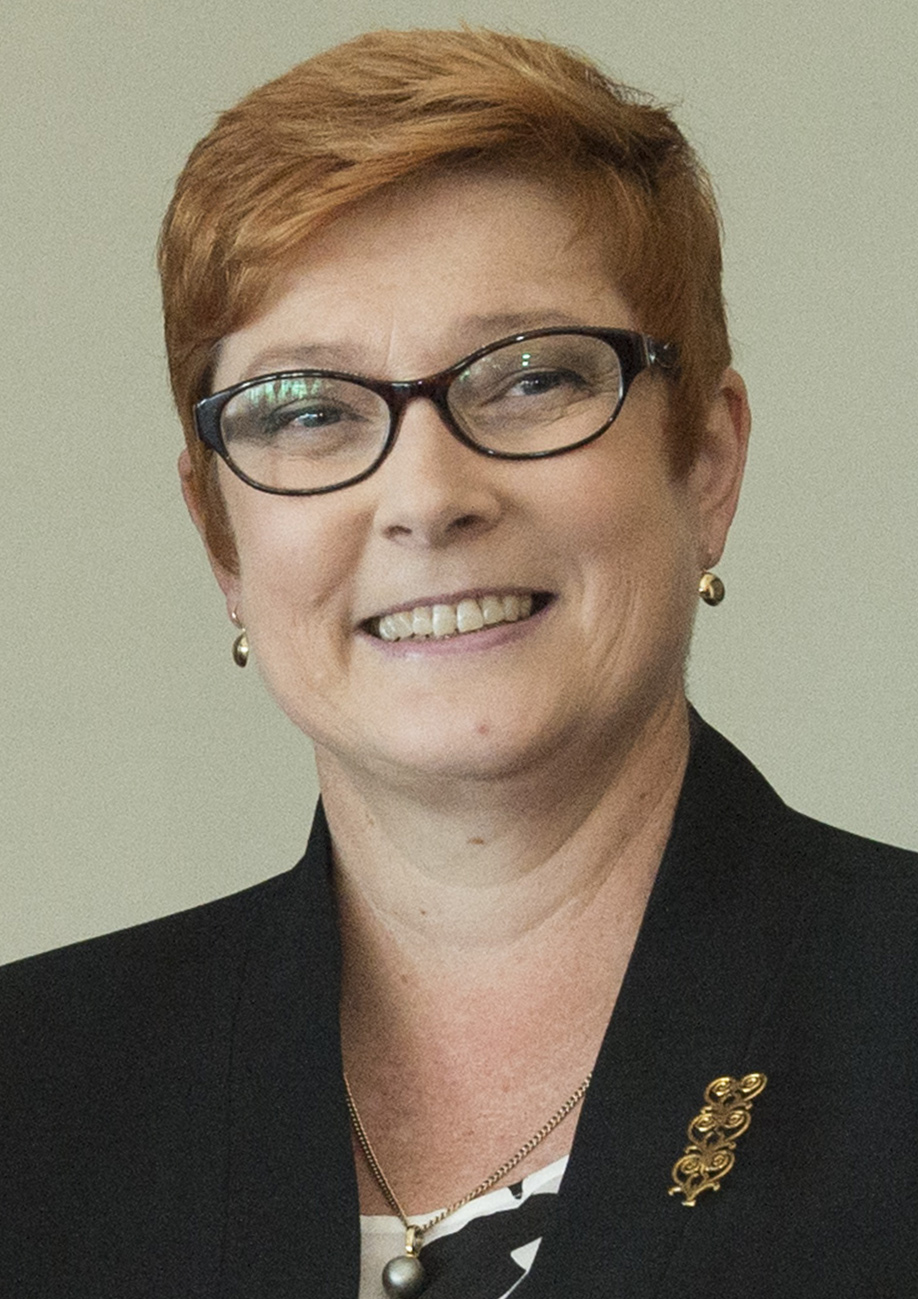
Marise Payne, Senator and Minister for Defence

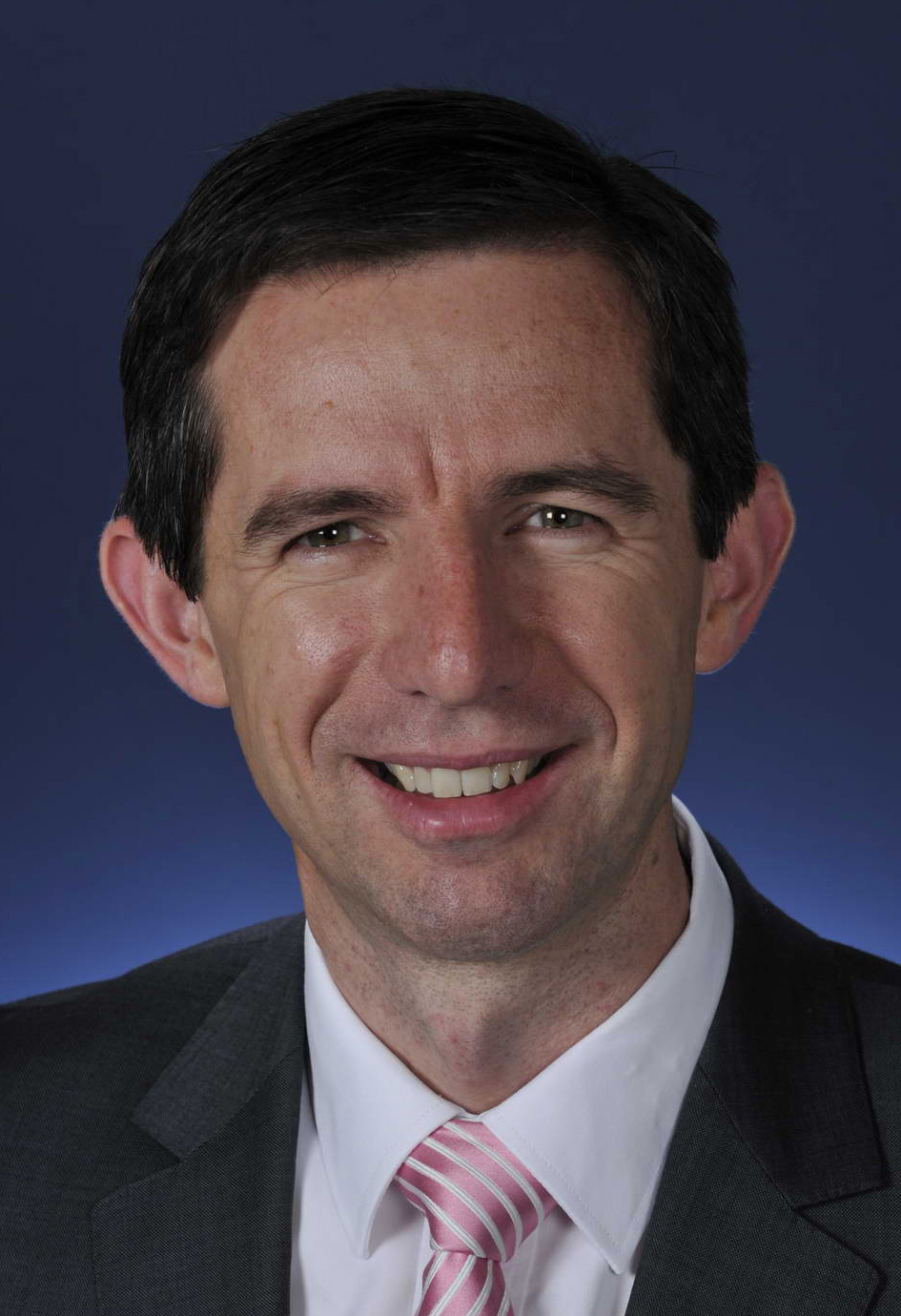
Simon Birmingham, Senator and Minister for Education and Training
