= Sydney University Liberal Club =

Australian student association

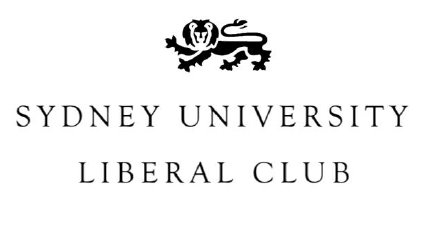
Sydney University Liberal Club Logo

The Sydney University Liberal Club (SULC) is a student association operating under the auspices of the University of Sydney Union (USU). The club hosts policy debates, annual dinners, student election campaigns, and guest speaker events with members of parliament. It is an affiliate of the Australian Liberal Students' Federation. The Sydney University Liberal Club exists alongside the newer University of Sydney Conservative Club, with both active on the University of Sydney campus.

== History ==
Founded in 1933, the Sydney University Liberal Club has a historical rivalry with the Melbourne University Liberal Club, which was established a few years earlier in 1925.

The patron of the Sydney University Liberal Club is former prime minister 1996–2007, John Howard. Whilst historically the Liberal Club claimed two state delegates within the Liberal Party, the club itself is no longer formally affiliated with the Party.

The club attracted attention for its early opposition to the White Australia policy. In 1958, it circulated a memorandum called "White Australia in a Changing World" at a Liberal Party Convention in Sydney, describing the policy as the "greatest stumbling block in our foreign policy that exists today."

A defining debate in the club over the past 30 years has been Voluntary Student Unionism (VSU). With the exception of a short period in the late 1990s, the Sydney University Liberal Club has been a consistent supporter of voluntary student unionism, and has attracted national media coverage in recent years for its pro-VSU counterprotests.

== John Howard Debating Cup ==
In 2010 the club launched the annual John Howard Debating Cup with the purpose of celebrating the legacy of the Howard Government and providing a forum for public policy debate amongst Liberal Students. The Howard Cup is an intervarsity debating competition between six Liberal Clubs across New South Wales, consisting of preliminary rounds and a grand finals.

In 2011 over 250 attendees from Sydney University, Macquarie University, University of Technology Sydney, University of New South Wales, University of Western Sydney, and the University of Wollongong attended the competition.

Each year the grand finals features an adjudication and keynote address by John Howard, and adjudications by notable conservatives like Tony Abbott, Malcolm Turnbull, Janet Albrechtsen, Piers Akerman, Alexander Downer, Natasha Maclaren-Jones, Tom Switzer, and Paul Fletcher. The Cup was initiated by then Vice-president Alex Dore. Winning teams of the competition have been:

- 2010 – University of Wollongong Liberal Club
- 2011 – Sydney University Liberal Club
- 2012 – Sydney University Liberal Club
- 2013 – Sydney University Liberal Club
- 2015 – University of New South Wales Liberal Club

== Controversies ==
In 2006, the Sydney Morning Herald reported that the club had become more conservative after a former member of the club proposed a resolution to reintroduce the death penalty for "heinous crimes", and to strip non-Christians of the Christmas and Easter holidays. This prompted allegations of 'strong conservatism', and claims that it risked the Liberal Party's reputation as "a broad church", even though these motions failed to pass or to attract any significant support.

In 2009, the club drew controversy in The Australian after a hostile takeover attempt by the "far-right" was quashed at an Annual General Meeting chaired by David Clarke MLC, and attended by Marie Ficarra MLC and Dominic Perrottet MP. An investigation by the Liberal Party ensued after allegations of threatening behaviour towards young members of the club; police were also called to the incident.

In May 2011, this same "far-right" group again drew controversy in the Sydney Morning Herald after the vice-president and secretary noticed the addition of over 60 international students to the club membership list just hours before a scheduled ordinary meeting. The ordinary meeting was subsequently disbanded by security, and a scheduled annual general meeting was postponed until September by the University of Sydney Union (USU). The stacking was instigated by then club president Adrian Pryke after his defection to the hard-right.

The club has also been a major contributor to the "Make Education Fair" campaign, headed by the Young Liberals. This campaign was created with the stated purpose of exposing and reducing political bias throughout all levels of education. A Senate enquiry conducted to examine this potential bias saw many club members provide evidence.

In 2016, the club had a split in membership over a contentious upcoming SULC election between the president and secretary. Amid concerns about vote-stacking, non-students registering to vote, and other issues, the University of Sydney dissolved the entire membership and required all members to re-apply in person.

On 23 September 2012, SULC hosted its annual President's Dinner with a keynote address by Sydney radio presenter Alan Jones. In his address Jones was cited as saying, "The old man recently died a few weeks ago of shame. To think that he had a daughter who told lies every time she stood for parliament" in reference to Prime Minister Julia Gillard's recently deceased father. At the same event the club auctioned off a jacket made of chaff bags, a reference to his previous comments on radio that Lord Mayor of Sydney, Clover Moore, Julia Gillard and Bob Brown should be "put into a chaff bag, thrown out to sea and made to swim back". These comments drew strong criticism from mass and social media commentators. Both the Liberal Club and Alan Jones issued an apology in relation to the matter.

On 30 October 2024, at an SRC meeting, members of the club ripped up the 2018 Red Zone Report which detailed an epidemic of sexual violence and hazing across Australian residential colleges, including "a culture of excessive drinking, disturbing rituals, and sexual harassment and assault" at the University of Sydney's St Paul's college. The meeting came days after several students were expelled and suspended for a sexually degrading hazing incident at St Paul's college.

== Past Presidents ==
Year	President
1946	Ted McWhinney
1947	Mali Stephen
1948	Barry French
1949	Mike Lazar
1950–51	F.J. Nicholls
1952	Brooks Wilson
1953–54	Don Hayward
1955	Bill Gale
1956	Jim Carlton
1957	Janet Spratt
1958	Vincent John Flynn
1959	Malcolm Beveridge
1960	Don Harding
1961–62	Brian Jardine
1963	John Hamilton
1964	Brian Jardine
1965	Peter Middleton
1967–68	David Mendelsson
1969	Wal Browne
1970–71	Paul McClintock
1972	John Booth
1973	Annabella Fletcher
1974	John Quinn
1975	Katrina Penrose
1976	Ian Whisken
1977	Valdis Berzins
1978	Kym Turner
1979	Kym Turner / James Harker-Mortlock
1980	Michael Christie
1981	John Holley
1982	Tony Dimmit
1983	Peter Griffiths
1984	Mark Hayward
1985	Stephen Coutts
1986	Michael Hughes
1987	Brendan Wong
1988	Luke Bunbury
1989	Joanna Doyle
1990	Andrew Ethell
1991	David Rook
1992	Stephen Galilee
1993	Justin Owen
1994	Jason Groves / Genevieve Turville
1995–96	Tony Chappel
1997–98	Parissa Notaras
1999–2000	Adam Faulkner
2001–02	Kyle Kutasi
2003	Dominic Perrottet
2004	Sonia Stavreff
2005	Charles Perrottet
2006	Tom Watson
2007	Tim Andrews
2008	Ben Potts
2009	Sasha Uher
2010	Adrian Pryke
2011–13	Alex Dore
2014–15	William Dawes
2016–17	Josh Crawford
2018–19	Jack O’Brien
2020–22	Alex Baird
2022–23	David Zhu
2023–25	Archie Cuttance
2025–	Maya Khurana

== Notable alumni ==
- Malcolm Turnbull MP, 29th Prime Minister of Australia, 2015–2018, Minister of Communications 2013–2015, Leader of the Opposition 2008–2009
- John Howard AC, 25th prime minister of Australia 1996–2007
- Joe Hockey MP, 38th Treasurer of Australia 2013–
- Mike Baird MP, 44th Premier of New South Wales, 2014–2017
- John Brogden, Leader of the NSW Opposition 2002–2005
- Kerry Chikarovski, Leader of the NSW Opposition 1998–2002
- Neville Wran, Premier of NSW, 1976–1986
- Tony Abbott MP, 28th Prime Minister of Australia, 2013 – 2015-
- Ted McWhinney, Member for Vancouver Quadra (Canada) 1993–2000
- Paul Fletcher MP, Member for Bradfield
- Angus Taylor MP, Member for Hume, 2013–, Leader of the Liberal Party 2026—
- Alex Hawke MP, Member for Mitchell
- Mitch Fifield, Australian senator
- Dominic Perrottet MP, Premier of New South Wales, Member for Castle Hill
- Don Harwin MLC, President of the NSW Legislative Council
- Peter Phelps Member of the NSW Legislative Council, 2011-2019
- Natasha Maclaren-Jones MLC, Member of NSW Legislative Council
- Marie Ficarra MLC, Member of NSW Legislative Council
- Jim Carlton AO, Minister for Health, 1982–1983
- Don Hayward, Victorian Minister for Education 1992–96
- Sandy Dawson SC, prominent Australian media and defamation barrister

== See also ==
- Australian Liberal Students' Federation
- University of Tasmania Liberal Club
