= Michael Owen (Australian politician) =

Australian politician

Michael Owen MP
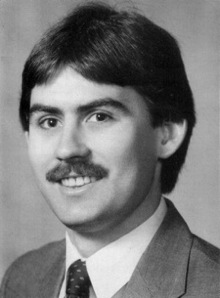

Member of the New South Wales Parliament for Bass Hill
- In office 2 August 1986 – 19 March 1988
- Preceded by: Neville Wran
- Succeeded by: Bill Lovelee

Personal details
- Born: Michael Joseph Owen; 13 July 1962 (age 63) New South Wales
- Party: Liberal Party of Australia

Michael Joseph Owen (born 13 July 1962) is a former Australian politician. He was the Liberal member for Bass Hill in the New South Wales Legislative Assembly from 1986 to 1988.

Owen was educated at St Therese Primary School in Padstow Heights, and then at De La Salle College in Revesby and Benilde High School in Bankstown. He worked as an insurance agent and real estate salesman before entering politics. He joined the Liberal Party in 1980, and served as Vice-President and then President of the Bankstown Young Liberals; he was also President and Treasurer of the Blaxland Federal Electoral Council and Vice-President of the Bankstown State Electoral Council.

In 1985, Owen was elected to Bankstown City Council at a by-election, representing the Liberal Party. He was re-elected in 1987, and served on the council until 1991, when he did not seek re-election.

In 1986, Premier Neville Wran resigned from parliament, triggering a by-election for Bass Hill, a safe Labor seat. Owen was selected as the Liberal candidate, and won the seat by 103 votes after the distribution of preferences, with the Labor primary vote dropping by 22.17% from the previous election. The seat was redistributed prior to the next election, consolidating it for Labor, and Owen was defeated by his opponent in the election Bill Lovelee whom Owen had earlier defeated at the by-election. He has not returned to politics.

New South Wales Legislative Assembly
Preceded by Neville Wran	Member for Bass Hill; 1986–1988	Succeeded by Bill Lovelee
