= Clarrie Earl =

Australian politician

Personal details
- Born: 3 April 1913 Heddon Greta, New South Wales
- Died: 31 July 1996 (aged 83) Brisbane, Queensland
- Party: Labor Party

Clarence Joseph Earl (3 April 1913 – 31 July 1996) was an Australian politician and a member of the New South Wales Legislative Assembly from 1953 until 1973. He was a member of the Labor Party (ALP).

Earl was born in Heddon Greta and was the son of a coalminer. He was educated at Christian Brothers' High School, Lewisham and initially worked as a farmhand on sheep stations. He attended Sydney Teachers College in 1937 and 1938 and worked as a teacher between 1939 and 1940 and between 1944 and 1953. Between 1940 and 1944, he served with the 2nd Australian Imperial Force and was wounded at Tobruk. Earl was elected to parliament as the member for the new and notionally safe Labor seat of Fairfield at the 1953 state election.

Earl retained the seat at the next 2 elections and transferred to the new and equally safe seat of Bass Hill at the 1962. Fairfield was successfully contested for Labor by the future Deputy Premier Jack Ferguson whose seat of Merrylands had been abolished. Earl retained Bass Hill until he retired from public life at the 1973 election. His retirement allowed the future Premier Neville Wran to transfer from the Legislative Council to an Assembly seat at the 1973 election. He did not hold party, parliamentary or ministerial office.

New South Wales Legislative Assembly
New seat	Member for Fairfield; 1953–1962	Succeeded by Jack Ferguson
New seat	Member for Bass Hill; 1962–1973	Succeeded by Neville Wran
