= John Flowers (politician) =

Australian politician

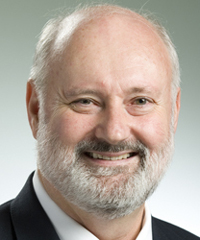

Member of the New South Wales Parliament for Rockdale
- In office 26 March 2011 – 6 March 2015
- Preceded by: Frank Sartor
- Succeeded by: Steve Kamper

Personal details
- Born: 14 January 1954
- Died: 12 April 2024 (aged 70)
- Party: Liberal Party
- Occupation: Teacher
- Website: Parliamentary webpage

John Frederick Flowers (14 January 1954 – 12 April 2024) was an Australian politician. He was a member of the New South Wales Legislative Assembly representing Rockdale for the Liberal Party from 2011 to 2015.

== Early years and background ==
Flowers was a teacher at Belmore Boys' High School for over 20 years. He served as a Councillor on Kogarah Council between 1999 until 2004, and then Rockdale Council since 2004, where he served as Deputy Mayor and then Mayor.

== Political career ==
In 2011, Flowers contested the normally safe Labor seat of Rockdale in the St George-Kogarah district. He was elected with 53.6 per cent of the two-party vote. Flowers' main opponent was Steve Kamper, representing Labor. Frank Sartor who was the previous Labor sitting member had earlier announced his retirement from politics after holding the seat for 8 years.

New South Wales Legislative Assembly
Preceded by Frank Sartor	Member for Rockdale; 2011–2015	Succeeded by Steve Kamper
