= George Thompson (Australian politician) =

Australian politician

George Edmund Thompson (born 27 May 1945) is a former Australian politician, who served as the member for Rockdale in the NSW State Parliament.

Thompson went to school at Marist Brothers, Kogarah and after finishing, got a job at the Rural Bank. While working at the bank, he became interested in industrial relations and trade unions, completing courses at Sydney and Harvard universities. In 1974, he was elected secretary of the Australian Bank Employees Union (State Bank Branch) .

When the former NSW Premier and Member for Rockdale Barrie Unsworth stepped down in 1991, Thompson (who had been Unsworth's campaign manager) was elected to replace him. He was a member of the NSW Parliament for twelve years, before stepping down at the 2003 state election. He is married with a son and a daughter.

New South Wales Legislative Assembly
Preceded by Barrie Unsworth	Member for Rockdale; 1991 – 2003	Succeeded by Frank Sartor
