= Steve Kamper =

Australian politician

Steve Kamper MP

Member of the New South Wales Parliament for Rockdale
- Incumbent
- Assumed office 28 March 2015
- Preceded by: John Flowers

Minister for Lands and Property
- Incumbent
- Assumed office 4 April 2023
- Premier: Chris Minns
- Preceded by: Kevin Anderson

Minister for Small Business
- In office 4 April 2023 – 17 March 2025
- Premier: Chris Minns
- Preceded by: Victor Dominello
- Succeeded by: Janelle Saffin

Minister for Sport
- Incumbent
- Assumed office 4 April 2023
- Premier: Chris Minns
- Preceded by: Alister Henskens

Minister for Multiculturalism
- Incumbent
- Assumed office 4 April 2023
- Premier: Chris Minns
- Preceded by: Mark Coure

Minister for Jobs and Tourism
- Incumbent
- Assumed office 17 March 2025
- Premier: Chris Minns
- Preceded by: John Graham

Personal details
- Born: Sydney, Australia
- Party: Labor Party
- Profession: Accountant
- Website: www.stevekamper.com

Stephen Kamper (born in Sydney) is an Australian politician who was elected to the New South Wales Legislative Assembly as the member for Rockdale for the Labor Party at the 2015 New South Wales state election. He is currently the Minister for Sport, Minister for Lands and Property, Minister for Small Business, and Minister for Multiculturalism in the Minns ministry.

== Political career ==
With the retirement of Frank Sartor in the seat of Rockdale at the 2011 New South Wales state election, Labor's national executive selected Kamper as the candidate, causing friction with the local branch. John Flowers of the Liberal Party won the seat in its landslide victory.

Three years later in March 2014, a rank and file ballot was conducted to determine the candidate but Kamper was the only nominee. At the 2015 election, Kamper won back the seat for Labor.

As a result of the shadow ministry reshuffle following Chris Minns' election as Leader of the Opposition, Kamper was appointed Shadow Minister for Property, Shadow Minister for Small Business, and Shadow Minister for Multiculturalism.

Kamper was sworn in as Minister of his existing portfolios, in addition to Sport, following Labor's victory in the 2023 New South Wales state election.

Kamper was additionally sworn in to the portfolio of Minister for Jobs and Tourism in March 2025.

== Personal life ==
Kamper is married to Magda and together they have five children and nine grandchildren. He attended Sans Souci Public School and James Cook Boys High School in Kogarah and prior to entering the parliament was a senior partner in Kamper Chartered Accountants.

New South Wales Legislative Assembly
Preceded by John Flowers	Member for Rockdale; 2015–present	Incumbent
