= Bill Lovelee =

Australian politician

William Thomas Lovelee (born 4 March 1951) is a former Australian politician. He was the Labor member for Bass Hill in the New South Wales Legislative Assembly from 1988 to 1991.

Lovelee was born in Narrabri and was educated at Farrer Agricultural College in Tamworth. He worked for the British Merchant Navy at Glebe Island as a fitter and machinist, and was active in youth affairs as the founder of the Bankstown blue light disco and a director of the DC24 drug centre. Having joined the Labor Party in 1975, he served for a period on Bankstown City Council.

In 1988, he was selected as the Labor candidate for the traditionally safe seat of Bass Hill. He was previously the ALP candidate in the 1986 by-election for seat triggered by the retirement of the previous member and former Premier Neville Wran, but Lovelee was defeated by Liberal candidate Michael Owen. At the 1988 general election Lovelee defeated Owen in a rematch, but the seat was abolished in 1991 and Lovelee retired.

New South Wales Legislative Assembly
Preceded by Michael Owen	Member for Bass Hill; 1988–1991	Succeeded by Abolished
