= Electoral district of Rockdale =

Rockdale New South Wales—Legislative Assembly
- Interactive map of district boundaries from the 2023 state election
- State: New South Wales
- Dates current: 1927–1930; 1941–present
- MP: Steve Kamper
- Party: Labor Party
- Namesake: Rockdale
- Electors: 56,421 (2019)
- Area: 41.79 km^{2} (16.1 sq mi)
- Demographic: Outer-metropolitan
Electorates around Rockdale:
Canterbury	Summer Hill	Heffron
Kogarah	Rockdale	Maroubra
Miranda	Cronulla	Cronulla

Rockdale is an electoral district of the Legislative Assembly in the Australian state of New South Wales.

== Geography ==
On its current boundaries, Rockdale takes in the suburbs of Arncliffe, Banksia, Bardwell Park, Bardwell Valley, Beverley Park, Bexley, Bexley North, Brighton-Le-Sands, Dolls Point,Kogarah, Kogarah Bay, Kyeemagh, Monterey, Ramsgate, Ramsgate Beach, Rockdale, Sandringham, Sans Souci, Turrella and Wolli Creek.

It is represented by Steve Kamper of the Labor Party.

== History ==
Rockdale electoral district was first created in 1927, with the breakup of the multi-member St George. In 1930, it was abolished and largely replaced by Arncliffe.

Rockdale Council sought a new electorate for Rockdale as early as 1937. In 1941, Arncliffe was abolished and replaced by a recreated Rockdale and Cook's River.

== Members for Rockdale ==
First incarnation (1927–1930)
Member	Party	Term
Guy Arkins	Nationalist	1927–1930
Second incarnation (1941–present)
Member	Party	Term
John McGrath	Labor	1941–1959
Brian Bannon	Labor	1959–1986
Barrie Unsworth	Labor	1986–1991
George Thompson	Labor	1991–2003
Frank Sartor	Labor	2003–2011
John Flowers	Liberal	2011–2015
Steve Kamper	Labor	2015–present

== Election results ==
2023 New South Wales state election: Rockdale
Party	Candidate	Votes	%	±%
Labor	Steve Kamper	24,893	52.9	+6.8
Liberal	Muhammad Rana	13,942	29.6	−3.6
Greens	Peter Strong	5,109	10.9	+2.8
Sustainable Australia	James Morris	3,127	6.6	+6.6
Total formal votes		47,071	95.2	−0.2
Informal votes		2,378	4.8	+0.2
Turnout		49,449	87.1	−1.5
Two-party-preferred result
Labor	Steve Kamper	28,468	65.4	+5.4
Liberal	Muhammad Rana	15,086	34.6	−5.4
Labor hold		Swing	+5.4	
