= University of Tasmania Liberal Club =

Student political organisation in Tasmania, Australia

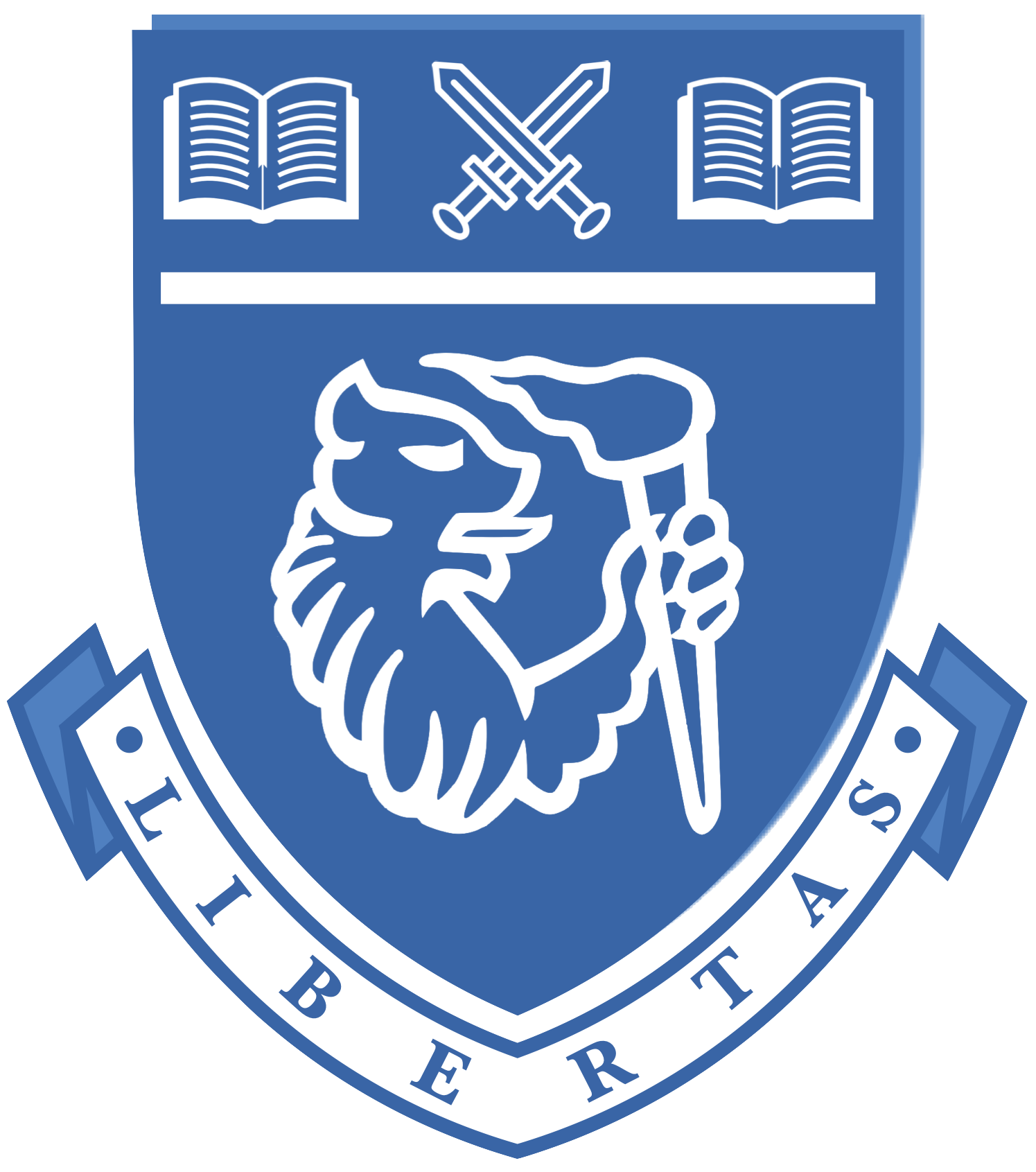
- President: Jason Dale
- Vice President: Ava Schultz
- Treasurer: Isaac Fassina
- Spokesperson: Jason Dale
- Founded: 4 June 1945; 81 years ago
- Ideology: Centre-right
- Mother party: Liberal Party of Australia
- State party: Liberal Party of Australia (Tasmanian Division)
- National affiliation: Australian Liberal Students' Federation
- University affiliation: University of Tasmania
- Magazine: The Student Liberal
- Website: TBA

The University of Tasmania Liberal Club (TULC) is a politically affiliated club based at the University of Tasmania. The club is closely tied with the Liberal Party of Australia and at times through its history has been a constitutional branch of the Tasmanian Division. The club is the fourth oldest of its kind in Australia after the University of Melbourne Liberal Club founded in 1925, the Sydney University Liberal Club in 1933 and the University of Western Australia Liberal Club in 1944. The club hosts policy debates, annual dinners, student election campaigns, and guest speaker events with members of parliament. It is an affiliate of the Australian Liberal Students' Federation and the Tasmania University Union.

== History ==
The club was founded on 4 July 1945 as a branch of the Liberal Party of Australia (Tasmanian Division). The then branch was officially opened by Leader of the Opposition and leader of the Nationalist Party in Tasmania Henry Baker. Among the first executive elected was Brendan Lyons, the son of Joseph Lyons, who was elected to the position of secretary and at the 1982 election was elected to represent the Division of Bass for the Liberal Party, serving as a minister in Robin Gray's Government from 1984 to 1986.

In 1966 the National Union of Australian University Students held one of its first student protests against the Vietnam War. The nationwide 'Day of Action' protested Australia's involvement in the war, including against sending conscripts to Vietnam. The Tasmania University Union's SRC passed a motion to participate within the national protest, however, the union's involvement was almost halted when the Club censured the SRC's actions in a Union membership meeting. The censure was eventually overturned and on the 'Day of Protest' the union participated. The Club organised a counter-protest, in which eight members of the Clubs handed out pro-war leaflets while wearing their academic gowns.

In 1980 the State Liberal opposition introduced voluntary unionism in the Tasmanian Parliament but was defeated after heated debate. In 1983, under Liberal Premier Robin Gray's government, the issue surfaced again. When the Government announced that it would introduce the then University Council backed the Student Union, and persuaded the government to set up a form of voluntary unionism: students could opt out of membership, but still had to pay the fee, renamed the Services and Amenities Fee. Few students took this alternative, only 55 students in 1985. In that same year with the leadership of Guy Barnett as president, the Club invited the Premier to address students. The Mercury Newspaper reported that there were rumours that eggs and tomatoes would be thrown at Gray, and students would be violent. In the event there was no violence, though over a thousand students came to hear Gray; he spoke competently, but the vast majority of the crowd was against him.

=== National Union of Students ===
The club has run endorsed and independent tickets for student union and National Union of Students delegates elections with varying degrees of success. While nationally Liberal Clubs and their candidates tend to receive around 5% - 10% of NUS delegate votes, in 2012 Club members secured a 3–3 tie with National Labor Students delegates. Club Vice-president, Claire Chandler won the position of Tasmanian State Branch President after a coin toss at the NUS National Conference in Melbourne. In 2015 and 2016 Club members obtained a majority of the NUS delegate positions, the first time Liberals had received a majority of the State positions. Subsequently, Clark Cooley was elected State Branch President. The Tasmania University Union disaffiliated from the NUS in December 2016.

== Notable alumni ==
The club has produced many notable alumni, including journalists such as The Australian Financial Review columnist Joe Aston, business leaders, politicians, and legal professionals. Currently, three of the four Tasmanian Liberal Senators have been past members of the club. Club members have also served in partner and affiliate organisations including Trent Hasson, Claire Chandler, Saul Eslake and Jonathon Duniam who served as President of the Young Liberal Movement and Eric Abetz and Christian Street who have both served as President of the Australian Liberal Students Federation.

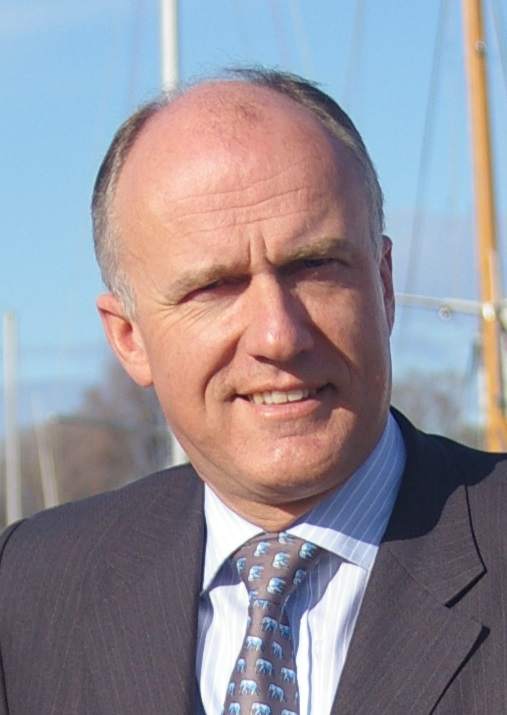
Eric Abetz, Senator and former Leader of the Government in the Senate

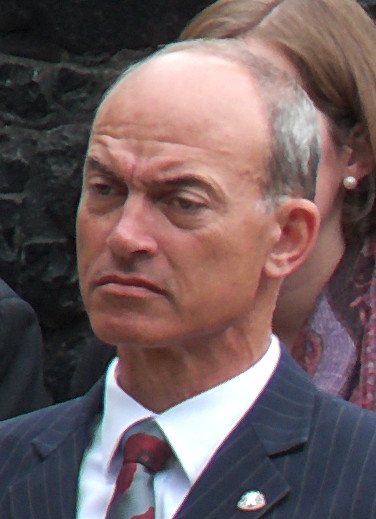
Guy Barnett, Minister for Resources, Minister for Energy, Minister for Building and Construction, and Member for Lyons

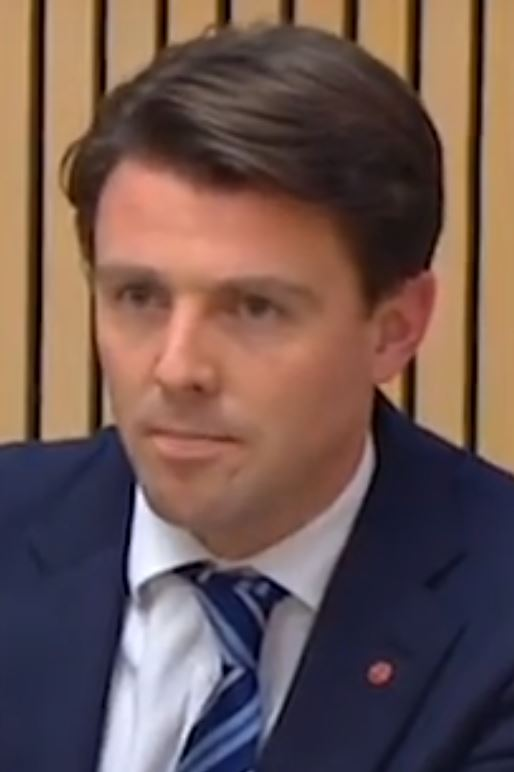
Jonathon Duniam, Senator and Chair of the Environment and Communications Legislation Committee

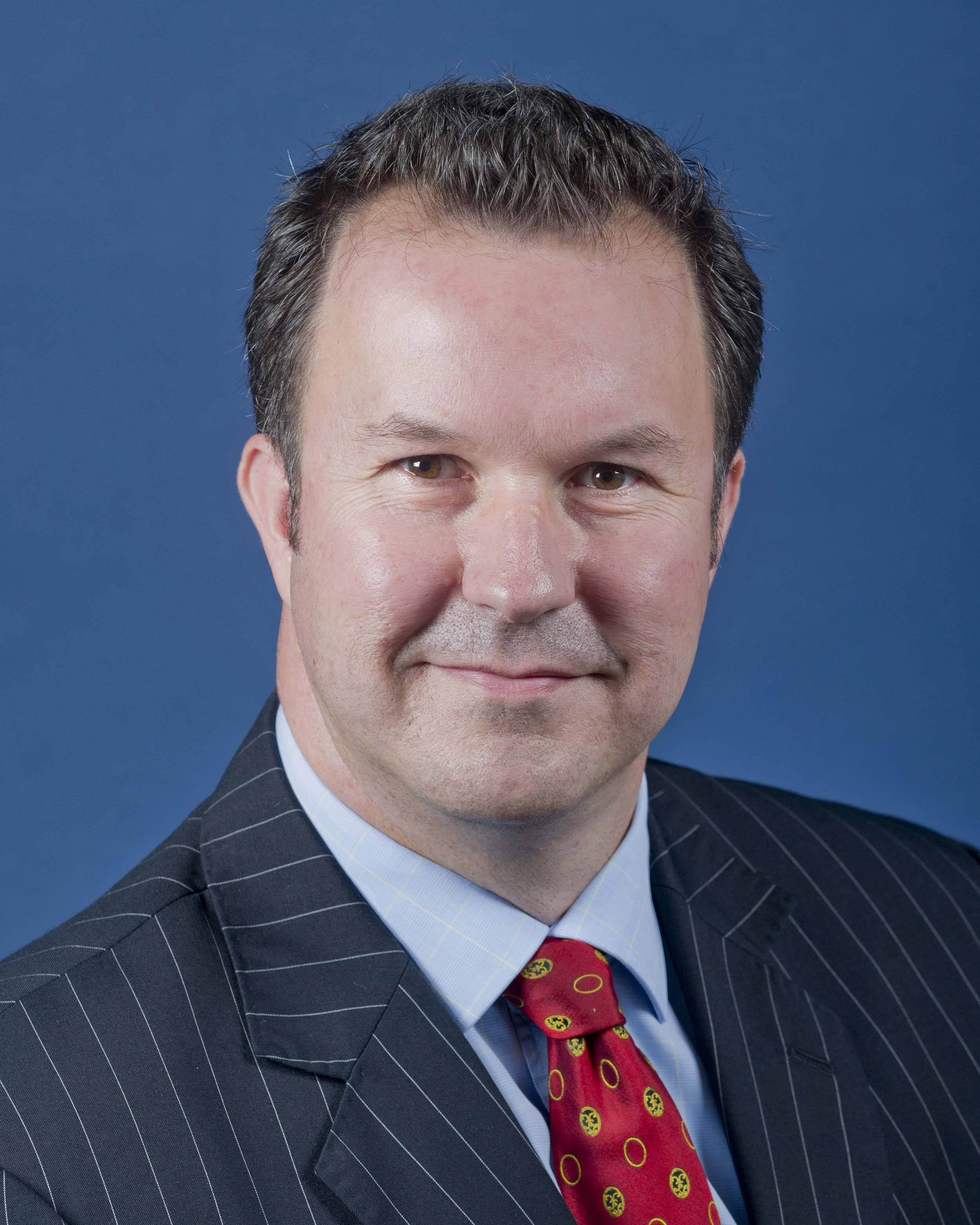
David Bushby, Senator and Chief Government Whip in the Senate

== See also ==
- Australian Liberal Students' Federation
- Sydney University Liberal Club
