= Barrie Unsworth =

Australian politician (born 1934)

The Honourable Barrie Unsworth
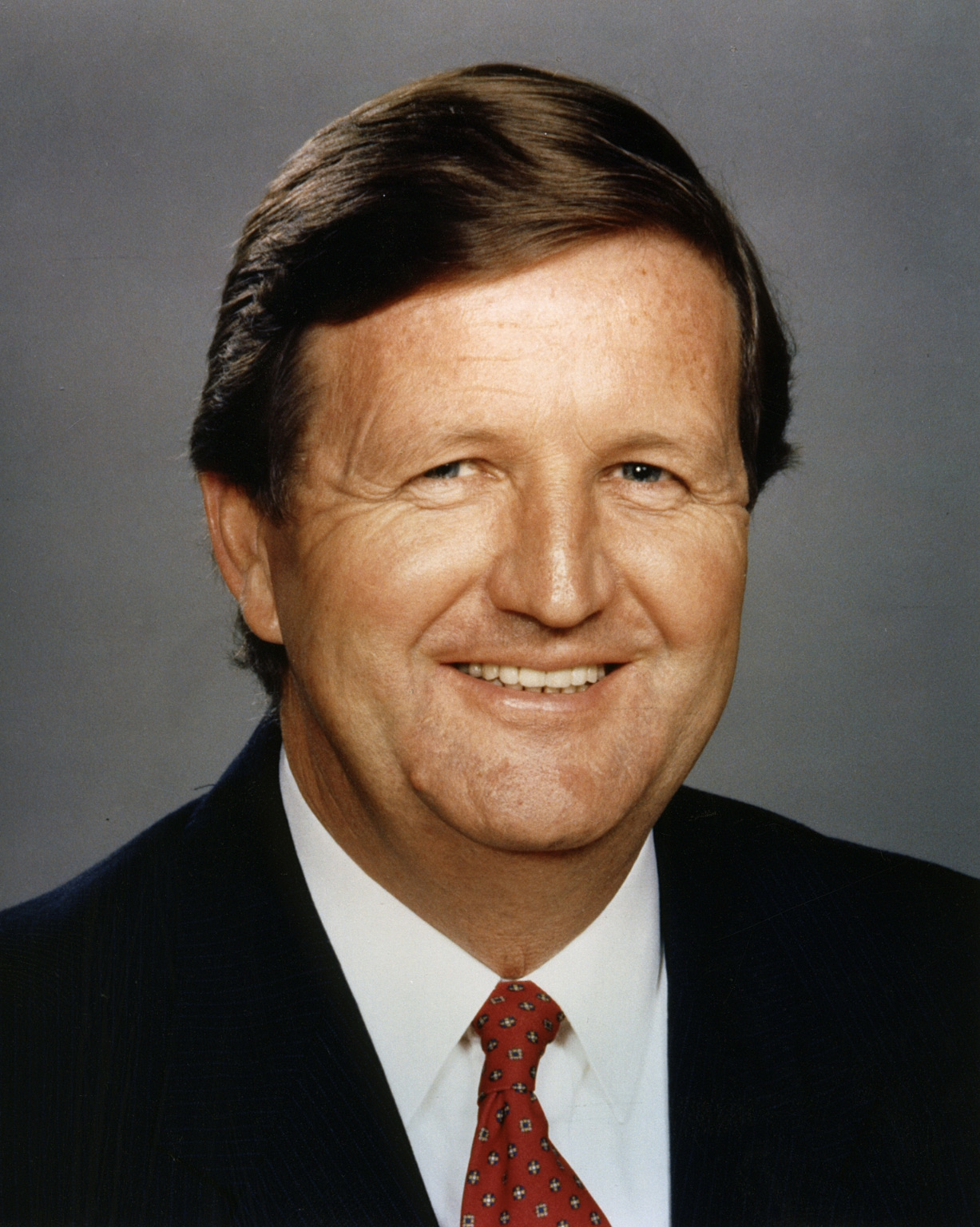
- Unsworth as premier c. 1987

36th Premier of New South Wales
- In office 4 July 1986 – 25 March 1988
- Monarch: Elizabeth II
- Governor: Sir James Rowland
- Deputy: Ron Mulock
- Preceded by: Neville Wran
- Succeeded by: Nick Greiner

Member of the New South Wales Parliament for Rockdale
- In office 2 August 1986 – 3 May 1991
- Preceded by: Brian Bannon
- Succeeded by: George Thompson

Member of the Legislative Council of New South Wales
- In office 6 November 1978 – 15 July 1986

Personal details
- Born: 16 April 1934 (age 92) Dubbo, New South Wales, Australia
- Party: Labor Party
- Spouse: Pauline Hennessy (m. 1955)
- Profession: Trade union official

Barrie John Unsworth (born 16 April 1934) is an Australian former politician, representing the Labor Party in the Parliament of New South Wales from 1978 to 1991. He served as the 36th Premier from July 1986 to March 1988. Since the death of Steele Hall on 10 June 2024, Unsworth is the oldest living premier of an Australian state.

== Early years ==
Unsworth, the son of Joseph and Olive Unsworth, was born in Dubbo, New South Wales, and educated in Sydney, at Kogarah High School. On leaving school at age 15, he was apprenticed as an electrical fitter. In 1955, aged 21 years, he married Pauline Hennessy and they subsequently had one daughter and three sons, one of whom has died; he and his wife have nine grandchildren, and two great-grandsons. Unsworth was initially an Apprentice Electrical Fitter, then Electrical Fitter, Electrical Testing Officer and subsequently Sales Representative for Sydney County Council from 1950 until 1960.

Unsworth had a brief period of military national service in 1953–1954 in the Royal Australian Navy (RAN).

== Union career ==
In 1961, Unsworth became an organiser of the Electrical Trades Union, and continued to build his career in the labour movement. He was awarded a Churchill Fellowship in 1966 to attend Harvard University Trade Union Program. The following year he was elected to the Labor Council of NSW and was its elected Secretary from 1979 to 1984. Unsworth was an Australian delegate to His Royal Highness the Duke of Edinburgh Study Conference, Oxford University in 1974.

During his career as an elected union official, Unsworth was appointed by the Wran Labor NSW Government to a range of positions on government bodies including:

- Public Transport Commission of New South Wales, Commissioner (1972–1975)
- Pipeline Authority, Member (1973–1978)

While working in the union movement Unsworth worked for the United States of America in what a historian has called "a discreet relationship".

== Political career ==
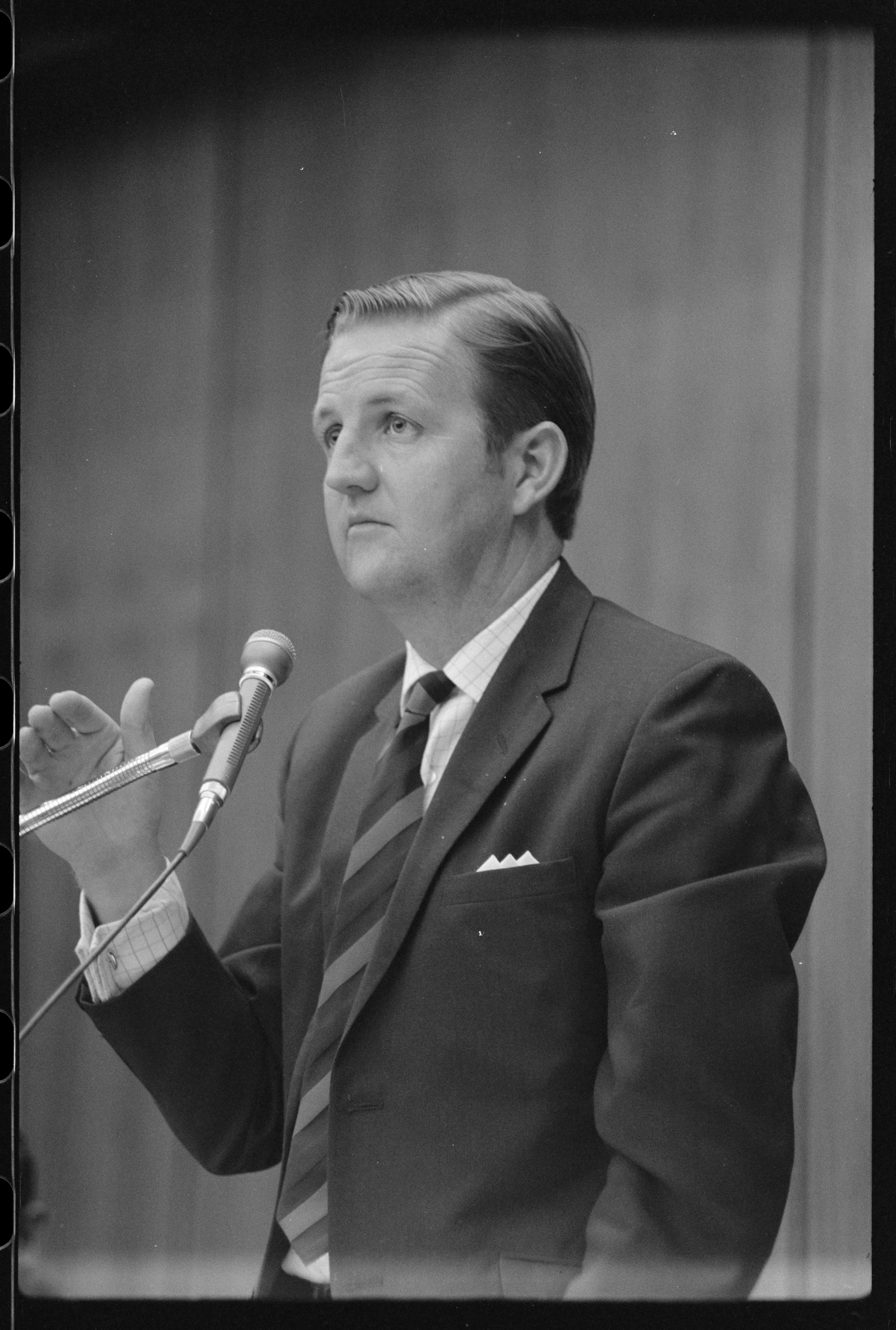
Unsworth in 1972.

Unsworth was elected a member of the New South Wales Legislative Council in 1978. While serving in the Legislative Council, he represented Australia as a delegate at the International Labour Organization (ILO) Worker Participation in Management Conferences held in Geneva (1980) and The Hague (1981).

In the Wran Labor Government, Unsworth was Minister for Transport (1984–1986) and Minister for Health (February–July 1986).

After the surprise retirement of Premier Neville Wran in May 1986, Unsworth became leader of the NSW Labor Party and thus Premier, and was also Minister for Ethnic Affairs and Minister for State Development. As Premiers are required by convention to be members of the Legislative Assembly, Brian Bannon, the member for the normally safe Labor seat of Rockdale, resigned to accept a government job as Chairman of the Homebush States Sport Centre Trust, and Unsworth contested the resulting by-election held on 2 August 1986. He only narrowly won the seat, with a 17.1% dive in the primary vote and hostile independent preferences giving him a margin of just 54 votes.

Unlike several of his predecessors including Wran, Unsworth chose not to be his own Treasurer.

Unsworth was Premier for two years until the Labor Party's landslide defeat by the Liberals' Nick Greiner in the 1988 elections. Unsworth did not contest the 1991 election.

== Life after politics ==
After leaving Parliament, Unsworth remained active in public life, chairing and serving on a number of government and community bodies. He continued to contribute to public policy debates and was widely respected across political parties.

He served as deputy chairman and then Chairman of the Australian Executive Committee for His Royal Highness Duke of Edinburgh Study Conference (1982–1998). Unsworth was General Manager of 2KY Broadcasters Pty Ltd Racing Radio 1992–2000. In 2001, he was a recipient of the Centenary Medal.

Following the election of the Carr Labor Government in 1995, Unsworth was placed on a number of key government and community bodies, including:

- Australia Day Council of New South Wales, Chairman (1995–2003)
- Totalizator Agency Board, Director (1997–2004)
- Delta Electricity, Director (1997–2006)
- New South Wales Centenary of Federation Committee, Chairman (1997–2002)
- Tempo Services, Director (1999–2005)
- Ambulance Service of New South Wales, Chairman (2001–2008)
- RailCorp, Director (2005–2008)
- State Transit Authority, Chairman (November 2004 to November 2009)
- WorkCover Authority of New South Wales, Chairman (1995–1997)
- Constitution Education Fund Australia, Trustee

During 2003–2008, Unsworth was a Director of Father Chris Riley's charity, Youth off the Streets, that provides crisis care, refuges, schools, drug programs and alcohol programs to young people in Australia and throughout Asia. Unsworth has also been a Director of Entherm Pty Ltd (2003–2005), Member of Overseas Trade Authority of New South Wales (1978) and a Director of Manly-Warringah Sea Eagles (2004–2006).

In 2003 and 2004, Unsworth was commissioned by the NSW Government to conduct a formal review of public bus services. In 2008 he headed a committee that considered the privatisation of the New South Wales' electricity industry. The committee and Unsworth supported the sale.

Unsworth lives in the Northern Beaches where he has participated in community campaigns to stop overdevelopment in NSW. He also led the effort to purchase and preserve the former home of Gough Whitlam as a historic site which would be open to the public.

Political offices
Preceded by Paul Landa	Leader of the Government in the Legislative Council; 1984 – 1986	Succeeded by Jack Hallam
Preceded by Paul Landa	Vice-President of the Executive Council; 1984 – 1986	Succeeded by Jack Hallam
Preceded by Peter Cox	Minister for Transport; 1984 – 1986	Succeeded by Ron Mulock
Preceded by Ron Mulock	Minister for Health; 1986	Succeeded by Peter Anderson
Preceded by Neville Wran	Premier of New South Wales; 1986 – 1988	Succeeded by Nick Greiner
Preceded by Neville Wran	Minister for Ethnic Affairs; 1986 – 1988	Succeeded by Nick Greiner
New title	Minister for State Development; 1986 – 1988	Succeeded by Wal Murray
New South Wales Legislative Assembly
Preceded by Brian Bannon	Member for Rockdale; 1986 – 1991	Succeeded by George Thompson
Party political offices
Preceded by Paul Landa	Leader of the Labor Party in the Legislative Council; 1984 – 1986	Succeeded by Jack Hallam
Preceded by Neville Wran	Leader of the Australian Labor Party in New South Wales; 1986 – 1988	Succeeded by Bob Carr
Trade union offices
Preceded by John Ducker	Secretary of the Labor Council of New South Wales; 1979 – 1984	Succeeded by John MacBean
