= Brian Bannon =

Australian politician (1930–2017)

Brian Joseph Bannon OAM (22 August 1930 – 6 October 2017) was an Australian politician. He was the Labor member for Rockdale in the New South Wales Legislative Assembly from 1959 to 1986. He died in Sydney on 6 October 2017.

== Biography ==
Bannon was born in Belmore in Sydney to storeman Victor Bannon and his wife Kathleen Wilkie. He was educated at St Thomas School in Lewisham and Marist Brothers in Kogarah, before becoming a clerk in the Public Trust Office in 1948 and private secretary to state Rockdale MP John McGrath. He joined the Labor Party on 5 October 1952 and rose to become Assistant Secretary of the ALP Youth Council. He was also a footballer, playing two years (1950–51) for St George in the President's Cup.

When McGrath retired in 1959, Bannon was selected as his replacement as Labor candidate for Rockdale. He won the seat by a narrow margin, and held it with much safer margins over the following years. Having spent over twenty-five years as a backbencher, he resigned in 1986 to make way for new Premier Barrie Unsworth, who needed to transfer to the Assembly from the Legislative Council. Bannon was appointed Chairman of the Homebush State Sports Centre Trust in return for his resignation.

New South Wales Legislative Assembly
Preceded by John McGrath	Member for Rockdale; 1959–1986	Succeeded by Barrie Unsworth
