= Electoral district of Bass Hill =

Former state electoral district of New South Wales, Australia

Bass Hill was an electoral district of the Legislative Assembly in the Australian State of New South Wales from 1962 to 1991, based on the south-west Sydney suburb of Bass Hill.

== Members for Bass Hill ==
Member	Party	Term
Clarrie Earl	Labor	1962–1973
Neville Wran	Labor	1973–1986
Michael Owen	Liberal	1986–1988
Bill Lovelee	Labor	1988–1991

== Election results ==
1988 New South Wales state election: Bass Hill
Party	Candidate	Votes	%	±%
Labor	Bill Lovelee	14,758	50.1	−16.1
Liberal	Michael Owen	12,062	41.0	+11.8
Independent EFF	Norm Axford	1,777	6.0	+6.0
Independent	Ernest Archer	831	2.8	+2.8
Total formal votes		29,428	96.4	+0.3
Informal votes		1,095	3.6	−0.3
Turnout		30,523	95.5	
Two-party-preferred result
Labor	Bill Lovelee	15,634	54.3	−14.1
Liberal	Michael Owen	13,180	45.7	+14.1
Labor hold		Swing	−14.1	
