= Neville Wran =

Australian politician (1926–2014)

The Honourable Neville Wran AC, CNZM, QC
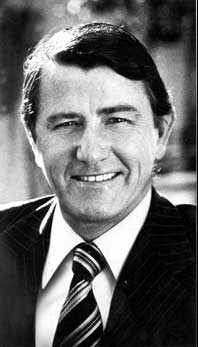
- Wran c. 1971

Chairman of the CSIRO
- In office 5 December 1986 – 4 December 1991
- Preceded by: Norman Boardman
- Succeeded by: Adrienne Clarke

35th Premier of New South Wales
- In office 14 May 1976 – 4 July 1986
- Monarch: Elizabeth II
- Governor: Sir Roden Cutler (1976–81); Sir James Rowland (1981–86)
- Deputy: Jack Ferguson (1976–84); Ron Mulock (1984–86)
- Preceded by: Sir Eric Willis
- Succeeded by: Barrie Unsworth

National President of the Labor Party
- In office 8 September 1980 – 3 July 1986
- Preceded by: Neil Batt
- Succeeded by: Mick Young

Leader of the Opposition
- In office 3 December 1973 – 14 May 1976

Member of the New South Wales Parliament for Bass Hill
- In office 17 November 1973 – 4 July 1986
- Preceded by: Clarrie Earl
- Succeeded by: Michael Owen

Member of the New South Wales Legislative Council
- In office 23 April 1970 – 19 October 1973

Personal details
- Born: Neville Kenneth Wran; 11 October 1926 Paddington, New South Wales, Australia
- Died: 20 April 2014 (aged 87) Elizabeth Bay, New South Wales, Australia
- Party: Australian Labor Party
- Spouses: Marcia Oliver (m. 1946; div. 1976); Jill Hickson (m. 1976)
- Children: 4
- Occupation: Lawyer
- Nickname: Nifty

Neville Kenneth Wran (11 October 1926 – 20 April 2014) was an Australian politician who was the Premier of New South Wales from 1976 to 1986. He was the national president of the Australian Labor Party (ALP) from 1980 to 1986 and chairman of both the Lionel Murphy Foundation and the Commonwealth Scientific and Industrial Research Organisation (CSIRO) from 1986 to 1991.

== Early years ==
Wran was born in the Sydney suburb of Paddington, the eighth and last child of Joseph Wran and his wife Lillian (née Langley). He was educated at Nicholson Street Public School, Balmain, Fort Street Boys High and the University of Sydney, where he was a member of the Liberal Club, and from which he gained a Bachelor of Laws in 1948. He was admitted as a solicitor in 1951, called to the Bar in 1957, and became a Queen's Counsel in 1968.

His great-grandfather, the eminent High Victorian architectural sculptor, Thomas Vallance Wran (1832–1891), whose carvings can be seen on the Martin Place front of the General Post Office, came from Chichester. Thomas Wran – the surname is Austrian – settled initially at St Lawrence, Queensland, before he established himself in Caroline Street, Balmain, in 1872.

== Political career ==
Wran began his political career in 1970 when he became a member of the upper house of the Parliament of New South Wales, the Legislative Council. Three years afterwards, he moved to the lower house, the Legislative Assembly, in the seat of Bass Hill. Support for this move had been organised by the General Secretary of the FMWU, Ray Gietzelt. He then challenged Pat Hills for the state leadership of the Labor Party (which Hills had held since 1968). In this challenge he had cross-faction support from right-wing powerbroker John Ducker and left-winger Jack Ferguson. There were two rounds to the leadership vote which resulted in a tie between Hills and Wran in the second ballot. However, under Labor Party rules of the time, in the event of a tie in the second ballot, the candidate who won the most votes in the first ballot would be the winner. Since Wran had won one vote more than Hills in the first ballot, Wran was therefore declared the new leader.

In May 1976, six months after Gough Whitlam's federal Labor government's dismissal, Wran led Labor to victory, narrowly defeating the Liberal Party premier, Sir Eric Willis. Wran's win was not assured until it became clear that Gosford and Hurstville had fallen to Labor by only 74 and 44 votes respectively, giving Wran a one-seat majority.

In 1978, Willis resigned, causing a by-election to be held for the seat of Earlwood, which had been held by the Liberal Party for three decades. Labor won the by-election, beating the Liberal candidate Alan Jones. Later that year, campaigning with the slogan "Wran's our Man", his government won a 13-seat swing, popularly known as the "Wranslide". This came on the back of 57.7 percent of the primary vote, the largest primary vote for any party in a century. The Opposition Leader on that occasion, Peter Coleman, lost his seat.

In 1981, Wran won a second "Wranslide", picking up a six-seat swing for what is still NSW Labor's largest proportion of seats in Parliament (69 out of 99 seats, 69.7 percent of the chamber). The Opposition Leader, Bruce McDonald, failed to be elected to the seat that he contested, marking the second time in a row that an Opposition Leader had failed to be elected to Parliament. Labor also reduced the Liberals to 14 seats, the same as its nominal junior partner, the National Country Party. He won a fourth term in 1984; although he suffered an 11-seat swing, he still won a larger majority than any of the victories won by the Liberals' Sir Robert Askin in the 1960s and 1970s.

In 1977, Wran supported Al Grassby, former Federal Immigration Minister, in allowing Domenico Barbaro, a Mafia figure in the Griffith region of New South Wales, back into Australia after having been earlier deported because of his criminal record. However, as journalist David Hickie explains, Wran attempted to undermine the influence of organised crime, particularly in the area of illegal casinos.

Wran was also very popular, at one stage rating over 80 per cent approval in opinion polls. He was often talked about as a national political leader and rated highly in national polls as an alternative Labor Leader to Bill Hayden. He featured in Hayden's 1980 federal election campaign, along with Bob Hawke.

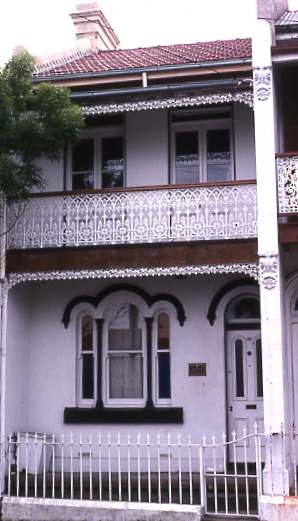
Wran's childhood home in the Sydney suburb of Balmain

Wran's first half of his tenure as a Labor premier came at a time when most Australian governments were held by conservative coalitions, a trend subsequently reversed in the early 1980s following the elections of Labor governments to both federal and state parliaments. During his 10 years as Premier of New South Wales, the government embarked on a program of reform and change. Priorities were public transport, the environment, consumer protection and job creation. He also achieved significant electoral institutional reform such as a democratic Legislative Council, four-year terms, public funding and disclosure laws and a pecuniary interests register for members of parliament. He called on Edwin Lusher, firstly while a QC and then as a Judge of the Supreme Court of New South Wales, to chair commissions of inquiry into police administration and gambling. He also undertook the state's largest capital works program and refurbished many iconic places in Sydney. His government also built the modern-day Darling Harbour precinct.

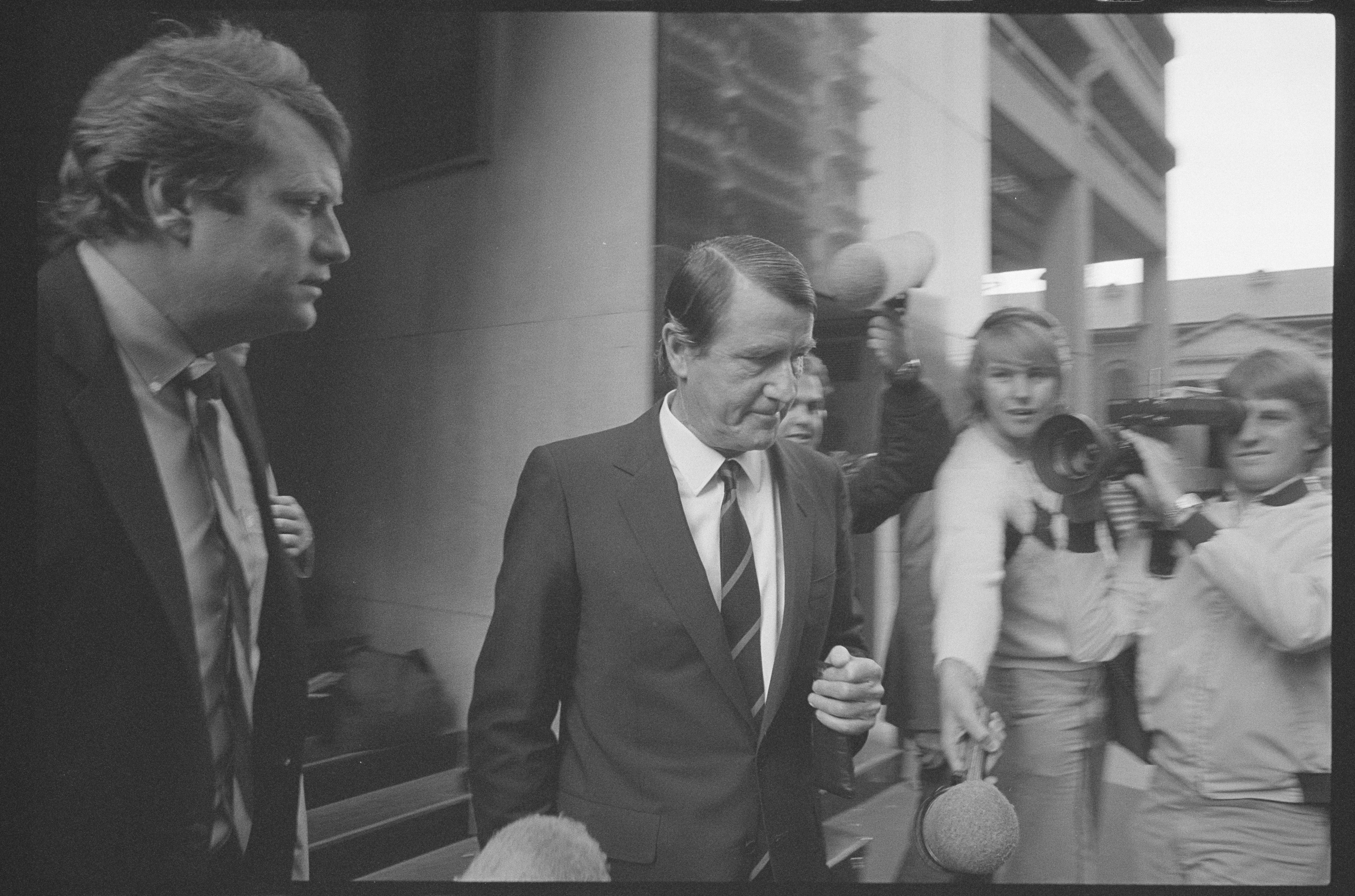
Wran confronted by journalists after appearing before the Street Royal Commission, 1983

In 1983, Wran faced the Street Royal Commission over claims by the Australian Broadcasting Corporation (ABC) current affairs show Four Corners that he had tried to influence the magistracy over the 1977 committal of Kevin Humphreys, who had been charged with misappropriation of funds. He was completely exonerated, and sued the ABC for defamation. His Corrective Services Minister, Rex Jackson, was jailed in 1987 for accepting bribes for the early release of prisoners.

In 1984, Wran introduced a private members bill to decriminalise adult gay male sex, and the bill passed the NSW Parliament. This was the first time in NSW history a conscience vote was both introduced and passed by the NSW Parliament.

Wran resigned both the premiership and his seat in Parliament on 4 July 1986, after continuously holding office longer than any other premier in the history of New South Wales until that time (10 years and 81 days). Bob Carr has since broken that record. (Henry Parkes served longer than both Wran and Carr in total, serving for 11 years and 278 days over five terms between 1872 and 1891.) The by-election for Wran's seat of Bass Hill was narrowly won by Michael Owen for the Liberal Party—a harbinger of his party's heavy defeat at the state election two years later.

In March 2021, ABC Television broadcast an investigative documentary series, The Ghost Train Fire as a second series of the Exposed program which directly implicated Abe Saffron in an arson plot at Luna Park Sydney in 1979, resulting in the deaths of seven people, six of them children.

It was alleged by the program that the motive was control of the valuable harbourside land next to the Sydney Harbour Bridge and with unobstructed views of the Sydney Opera House. It was the intention of Saffron and associate Jack Rooklyn, a poker-machine promoter, to gain control of and redevelop the Luna Park site. NSW premiers Robert Askin and Neville Wran have been named as corrupt close associates of Saffron, along with the police commissioner Norman "Bill" Allan, the High Court justice Lionel Murphy and lawyer Morgan Ryan, among others. The findings of the ABC TV documentary, including Wran's alleged association with Saffron, were forensically disputed by Milton Cockburn in his book, The Assassination of Neville Wran (Connor Court 2024).

Wran is remembered by the phrase "Balmain boys don't cry" in his speech at the June 1983 ALP Annual Conference. At a press conference after announcing his departure Wran was asked what was his greatest achievement as premier, he answered, "saving the rainforests".

== Personal life ==
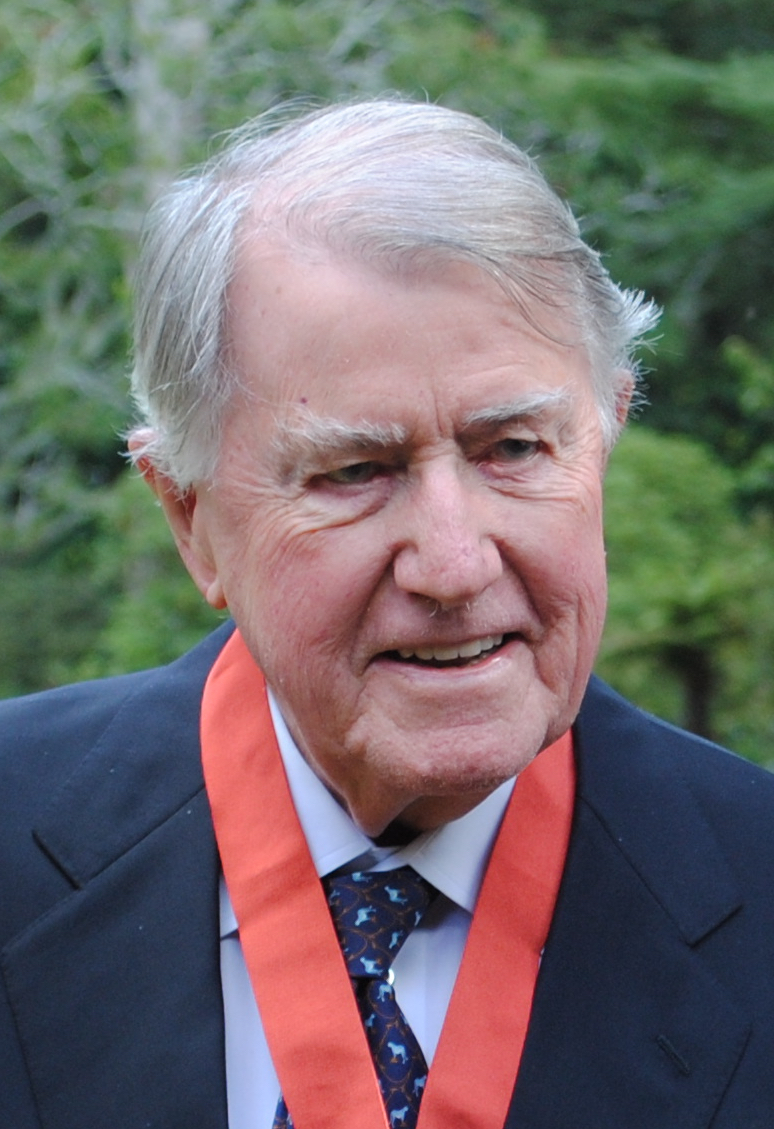
Wran in 2010

Wran's first marriage was in 1946 at the age of 20, to Marcia Oliver, a showgirl at the New Tivoli Theatre. Oliver had a young son, whom Wran adopted, and they had one other child together, actress Kim Wran. In 1976, a month after his divorce was finalised and three months after becoming Premier of New South Wales, Wran married Jill Hickson, and they had two children together. Wran and Hickson separated several times, first briefly in 2006, then in August 2011 after Hickson said she had been "frozen out" of her husband's personal affairs by his daughter Kim and his friend and business partner Albert Wong. They had reconciled by December 2011.

A severe throat infection in 1980 required injections of teflon to strengthen his damaged vocal cords, resulting in his characteristic croaky voice.

On 12 May 2016, Wran was named in the Panama Papers (which also named then-Prime Minister Malcolm Turnbull), due to his former directorship of the Mossack Fonseca-incorporated company Star Technology Systems Limited. Wran resigned from that position in 1995. A report by the Australian Broadcasting Corporation notes that "There is no suggestion of any wrongdoing by either Mr Turnbull or Mr Wran."

== Death ==
In his later years, Wran had dementia and from July 2012 had been under special care at the Lulworth House aged care facility in Elizabeth Bay. He died there on Easter Sunday, 20 April 2014 at the age of 87. He was survived by his wife Jill and four children.

A state funeral was held at the Sydney Town Hall on 1 May 2014.

== Honours ==
- In June 1987 he was appointed an Officer in the Order of the Golden Ark (Netherlands) "for his contribution to the environment".
- In October 1987 he was appointed a Grand Officer (2nd Class) of the Order of Merit of the Italian Republic by the President of Italy, Francesco Cossiga.
- He was appointed a Companion of the Order of Australia on 26 January 1988 "For service to government and politics and to the New South Wales Parliament".
- On 6 May 1995 the University of Sydney awarded Wran the degree of Doctor of Laws (honoris causa).
- In the 2010 New Year Honours, Wran was appointed a Companion of the New Zealand Order of Merit for services to New Zealand–Australia relations.

New South Wales Legislative Assembly
Preceded by Clarrie Earl	Member for Bass Hill; 1973–1986	Succeeded by Michael Owen
Political offices
Preceded by Reg Downing	Leader of the Opposition of New South Wales in the Legislative Council; 1972–1973	Succeeded by Leroy Serisier
Preceded by Pat Hills	Leader of the Opposition of New South Wales; 1973–1976	Succeeded by Sir Eric Willis
Preceded by Sir Eric Willis	Premier of New South Wales; 1976–1986	Succeeded by Barrie Unsworth
Preceded by Jack Renshaw	Treasurer of New South Wales; 1980–1981	Succeeded by Ken Booth
Preceded by Ron Mulock	Minister for Mineral Resources; 1981–1983	Succeeded by Donald Day
Vacant Title last held by David Arblaster as Minister for Culture, Sport and Recreation	Minister for the Arts; 1984–1986	Succeeded by Frank Walker
Preceded by Paul Landa	Attorney General of New South Wales; 1984	Succeeded by Terry Sheahan
New title	Minister for Ethnic Affairs; 1985–1986	Succeeded by Barrie Unsworth
Preceded by George Paciullo	Minister for Industry and Decentralisation; 1986	Succeeded by Eric Bedford
Preceded by George Paciullo	Minister for Small Business and Technology; 1986	Succeeded by Eric Bedford
Party political offices
Preceded by Pat Hills	Leader of the Australian Labor Party in New South Wales; 1973–1986	Succeeded by Barrie Unsworth
