= Electoral results for the district of Davidson =

Election results for Davidson, New South Wales, Australia

Davidson, an electoral district of the Legislative Assembly in the Australian state of New South Wales, has existed from 1971 to the present.

== Members ==
Election	Member	Party
1971	Dick Healey	Liberal
1973	Dick Healey	Liberal
1976	Dick Healey	Liberal
1978	Dick Healey	Liberal
1981	Terry Metherell	Liberal
1984	Terry Metherell	Liberal
1988	Terry Metherell	Liberal
1991	Terry Metherell	Liberal
1992 by	Andrew Humpherson	Liberal
1995	Andrew Humpherson	Liberal
1999	Andrew Humpherson	Liberal
2003	Andrew Humpherson	Liberal
2007	Jonathan O'Dea	Liberal
2011	Jonathan O'Dea	Liberal
2015	Jonathan O'Dea	Liberal
2019	Jonathan O'Dea	Liberal
2023	Matt Cross	Liberal

== Election results ==
=== Elections in the 2020s ===
==== 2023 ====
2023 New South Wales state election: Davidson
Party	Candidate	Votes	%	±%
Liberal	Matt Cross	28,865	54.1	−10.3
Labor	Karyn Edelstein	10,917	20.5	+6.3
Independent	Janine Kitson	6,080	11.4	+11.4
Greens	Caroline Atkinson	6,060	11.4	−2.1
Sustainable Australia	Andrew Wills	1,397	2.6	−1.1
Total formal votes		53,319	97.8	−0.1
Informal votes		1,196	2.2	+0.1
Turnout		54,515	91.1	0.0
Two-party-preferred result
Liberal	Matt Cross	30,821	63.9	−10.9
Labor	Karyn Edelstein	17,393	36.1	+10.9
Liberal hold		Swing	−10.9	

=== Elections in the 2010s ===
==== 2019 ====
2019 New South Wales state election: Davidson
Party	Candidate	Votes	%	±%
Liberal	Jonathan O'Dea	32,023	65.13	−4.52
Greens	Felicity Davis	6,652	13.53	+0.07
Labor	Joseph Von Bornemann	6,645	13.51	+0.86
Keep Sydney Open	Jacob Shteyman	1,984	4.04	+4.04
Sustainable Australia	Stephen Molloy	1,865	3.79	+3.79
Total formal votes		49,169	97.97	+0.19
Informal votes		1,021	2.03	−0.19
Turnout		50,190	91.35	−1.12
Two-party-preferred result
Liberal	Jonathan O'Dea	33,750	75.47	−3.52
Labor	Joseph Von Bornemann	10,967	24.53	+3.52
Two-candidate-preferred result
Liberal	Jonathan O'Dea	33,440	75.24	−3.58
Greens	Felicity Davis	11,004	24.76	+3.58
Liberal hold		Swing	−3.58	

==== 2015 ====
2015 New South Wales state election: Davidson
Party	Candidate	Votes	%	±%
Liberal	Jonathan O'Dea	34,234	69.6	−4.2
Greens	David Sentinella	6,615	13.5	+0.7
Labor	Douglas St Quintin	6,222	12.7	+4.3
Christian Democrats	Mariam Salama	1,067	2.2	+0.1
No Land Tax	Kate Bevan	1,014	2.1	+2.1
Total formal votes		49,152	97.8	+0.2
Informal votes		1,118	2.2	−0.2
Turnout		50,270	92.5	+0.3
Notional two-party-preferred count
Liberal	Jonathan O'Dea	35,600	79.0	−7.2
Labor	Douglas St Quintin	9,469	21.0	+7.2
Two-candidate-preferred result
Liberal	Jonathan O'Dea	35,447	78.8	−4.2
Greens	David Sentinella	9,525	21.2	+4.2
Liberal hold		Swing	−4.2	

==== 2011 ====
2011 New South Wales state election: Davidson
Party	Candidate	Votes	%	±%
Liberal	Jonathan O'Dea	33,112	74.2	+13.8
Greens	John Davis	5,572	12.5	−1.0
Labor	Mathew Gilliland	3,626	8.1	−8.7
Independent	Helen Owen	1,380	3.1	+3.1
Christian Democrats	Peter Chapman	924	2.1	−2.5
Total formal votes		44,614	97.9	+0.7
Informal votes		936	2.1	−0.7
Turnout		45,550	92.9	
Notional two-party-preferred count
Liberal	Jonathan O'Dea	34,839	86.5	+11.8
Labor	Mathew Gilliland	5,456	13.5	−11.8
Two-candidate-preferred result
Liberal	Jonathan O'Dea	34,294	83.4	+8.7
Greens	John Davis	6,842	16.6	+16.6
Liberal hold		Swing	+8.7	

=== Elections in the 2000s ===
==== 2007 ====
2007 New South Wales state election: Davidson
Party	Candidate	Votes	%	±%
Liberal	Jonathan O'Dea	25,358	60.4	+0.2
Labor	Doug McLeod	7,058	16.8	−3.0
Greens	Jo-Anne Lentern	5,671	13.5	+1.7
Democrats	Clinton Barnes	1,143	2.7	+0.8
Christian Democrats	Bruce York	1,934	4.6	+1.9
AAFI	David Kitson	807	1.9	+0.6
Total formal votes		41,971	97.2	−1.0
Informal votes		1,210	2.8	+1.0
Turnout		43,181	92.0	
Two-party-preferred result
Liberal	Jonathan O'Dea	27,516	74.7	+3.8
Labor	Doug McLeod	9,334	25.3	−3.8
Liberal hold		Swing	+3.8	

==== 2003 ====
2003 New South Wales state election: Davidson
Party	Candidate	Votes	%	±%
Liberal	Andrew Humpherson	23,795	58.7	+1.1
Labor	Angelo Rozos	8,411	20.7	−0.4
Greens	Conny Harris	4,853	12.0	+7.6
Christian Democrats	Wally Vanderpoll	1,144	2.8	−0.3
Unity	Zi Cai	880	2.2	−0.5
Democrats	Daniel Stevens	790	1.9	−4.1
AAFI	John Collins	663	1.6	+0.5
Total formal votes		40,536	98.1	+0.1
Informal votes		779	1.9	−0.1
Turnout		41,315	91.3	
Two-party-preferred result
Liberal	Andrew Humpherson	25,454	69.7	−1.4
Labor	Angelo Rozos	11,087	30.3	+1.4
Liberal hold		Swing	−1.4	

=== Elections in the 1990s ===
==== 1999 ====
1999 New South Wales state election: Davidson
Party	Candidate	Votes	%	±%
Liberal	Andrew Humpherson	23,394	57.6	−10.3
Labor	Peter Lawson	8,583	21.1	+6.2
Democrats	Scott Henderson	2,424	6.0	+0.5
Greens	Peter Tuor	1,804	4.4	−0.9
One Nation	Aubrey Golden	1,531	3.8	+3.8
Christian Democrats	Margaret Ratcliffe	1,278	3.1	+2.3
Unity	Kieran Ginges	1,116	2.7	+2.7
AAFI	Ian Weatherlake	459	1.1	−2.7
Total formal votes		40,589	98.0	+1.3
Informal votes		837	2.0	−1.3
Turnout		41,426	92.9	
Two-party-preferred result
Liberal	Andrew Humpherson	25,811	71.1	−7.1
Labor	Peter Lawson	10,502	28.9	+7.1
Liberal hold		Swing	−7.1	

==== 1995 ====
1995 New South Wales state election: Davidson
Party	Candidate	Votes	%	±%
Liberal	Andrew Humpherson	21,156	62.7	−2.7
Labor	Lee Morthorpe	6,523	19.3	+0.3
AAFI	Ian Weatherlake	2,393	7.1	+7.1
Greens	Peter Tuor	1,751	5.2	+5.2
Democrats	David Harcourt-Norton	1,721	5.1	−10.5
Natural Law	Louise Hargreaves	187	0.6	+0.6
Total formal votes		33,731	96.3	+4.4
Informal votes		1,309	3.7	−4.4
Turnout		35,040	93.9	
Two-party-preferred result
Liberal	Andrew Humpherson	22,983	72.8	+0.1
Labor	Lee Morthorpe	8,604	27.2	−0.1
Liberal hold		Swing	+0.1	

==== 1992 by-election ====
1992 Davidson by-election Saturday 2 May
Party	Candidate	Votes	%	±%
Liberal	Andrew Humpherson	15,852	49.32	−16.07
Independent	Julie Sutton	9,489	29.52	+29.52
Greens	Ross Knowles	1,195	3.72	+3.72
Democrats	Edna Cunningham	1,156	3.60	−12.01
Independent	Kevin Begaud	918	2.86	+2.86
Independent	Michael Evanian	852	2.65	+2.65
Call to Australia	Bruce Coleman	770	2.40	+2.40
Independent EFF	Michael Vescio	683	2.12	+2.12
Independent	Ted Roach	361	1.12	+1.12
Independent	Janet Fairlie-Cuninghame	357	1.11	+1.11
Independent	Peter Leney	190	0.59	+0.59
Independent	Steven Klinger	157	0.49	+0.49
Independent	William Williams	105	0.33	+0.33
Independent	Julien Droulers	34	0.11	+0.11
Independent	Sandor Torzsok	24	0.07	+0.07
Total formal votes		32,143	96.97	
Informal votes		1,006	3.03	
Turnout		33,149	87.10	
Two-candidate-preferred result
Liberal	Andrew Humpherson	17,352	59.65	−13.04
Independent	Julie Sutton	11,737	40.35	+40.35
Liberal hold		Swing	−13.04	

Terry Metherell, Liberal-turned Independent resigned.

==== 1991 ====
1991 New South Wales state election: Davidson
Party	Candidate	Votes	%	±%
Liberal	Terry Metherell	21,237	65.4	−1.7
Labor	Ian Faulks	6,172	19.0	−0.2
Democrats	Felicity Boyd	5,069	15.6	+14.1
Total formal votes		32,478	91.8	−5.5
Informal votes		2,889	8.2	+5.5
Turnout		35,367	93.5	
Two-party-preferred result
Liberal	Terry Metherell	22,577	72.7	−1.5
Labor	Ian Faulks	8,481	27.3	+1.5
Liberal hold		Swing	−1.5	

=== Elections in the 1980s ===
==== 1988 ====
1988 New South Wales state election: Davidson
Party	Candidate	Votes	%	±%
Liberal	Terry Metherell	18,327	61.3	−0.3
Independent	Julie Sutton	5,836	19.5	+19.5
Labor	Ray Graham	5,715	19.1	−14.0
Total formal votes		29,878	97.2	−0.9
Informal votes		851	2.8	+0.9
Turnout		30,729	94.3	
Two-candidate-preferred result
Liberal	Terry Metherell	18,610	64.0	−0.1
Independent	Julie Sutton	10,468	36.0	+36.0
Liberal hold		Swing	−0.1	

==== 1984 ====
1984 New South Wales state election: Davidson
Party	Candidate	Votes	%	±%
Liberal	Terry Metherell	19,246	63.0	+5.2
Labor	Julie Sutton	9,682	31.7	−10.5
Democrats	Anthony Dunne	1,601	5.2	+5.2
Total formal votes		30,529	98.2	+1.2
Informal votes		567	1.8	−1.2
Turnout		31,096	94.0	+2.4
Two-party-preferred result
Liberal	Terry Metherell		65.5	+7.7
Labor	Julie Sutton		34.5	−7.7
Liberal hold		Swing	+7.7	

==== 1981 ====
1981 New South Wales state election: Davidson
Party	Candidate	Votes	%	±%
Liberal	Terry Metherell	16,498	57.8	+0.4
Labor	Julie Sutton	12,037	42.2	−0.4
Total formal votes		28,535	97.0	
Informal votes		869	3.0	
Turnout		29,404	91.6	
Liberal hold		Swing	+0.4	

=== Elections in the 1970s ===
==== 1978 ====
1978 New South Wales state election: Davidson
Party	Candidate	Votes	%	±%
Liberal	Dick Healey	16,326	57.4	−9.0
Labor	Christopher Lennon	12,105	42.6	+9.0
Total formal votes		28,431	98.2	−0.2
Informal votes		522	1.8	+0.2
Turnout		28,953	93.2	−1.4
Liberal hold		Swing	−9.0	

==== 1976 ====
1976 New South Wales state election: Davidson
Party	Candidate	Votes	%	±%
Liberal	Dick Healey	18,209	66.4	+5.1
Labor	Raymond Graham	9,226	33.6	+10.0
Total formal votes		27,435	98.4	+0.2
Informal votes		451	1.6	−0.2
Turnout		27,886	94.6	+0.2
Liberal hold		Swing	−2.6	

==== 1973 ====
1973 New South Wales state election: Davidson
Party	Candidate	Votes	%	±%
Liberal	Dick Healey	15,298	61.3	−18.9
Labor	Walter Willington	5,897	23.6	+23.6
Australia	Veronica Carey	2,729	10.9	+10.9
Democratic Labor	Thomas Colman	1,048	4.2	−15.6
Total formal votes		24,972	98.2	
Informal votes		454	1.8	
Turnout		25,426	93.4	
Two-party-preferred result
Liberal	Dick Healey	17,228	69.0	−11.2
Labor	Walter Willington	7,744	31.0	+31.0
Liberal hold		Swing	−11.2	

==== 1971 ====
1971 New South Wales state election: Davidson
Party	Candidate	Votes	%	±%
Liberal	Dick Healey	18,119	80.2	
Democratic Labor	Thomas Colman	4,484	19.8	
Total formal votes		22,603	94.3	
Informal votes		1,363	5.7	
Turnout		23,966	92.7	
Liberal notional hold		Swing	N/A	

Dick Healey (Liberal) was the sitting member for Wakehurst
