= Electoral results for the district of Wakehurst =

Election results for Wakehurst, New South Wales, Australia

Wakehurst, an electoral district of the Legislative Assembly in the Australian state of New South Wales, has had one incarnation, from 1962 until the present.

== Members for Wakehurst ==
Election	Member	Party
1962	Dick Healey	Liberal
1965	Dick Healey	Liberal
1968	Dick Healey	Liberal
1971	Allan Viney	Liberal
1973	Allan Viney	Liberal
1976	Allan Viney	Liberal
1978	Tom Webster	Labor
1981	Tom Webster	Labor
1984	John Booth	Liberal
1988	John Booth	Liberal
1991	Brad Hazzard	Liberal
1995	Brad Hazzard	Liberal
1999	Brad Hazzard	Liberal
2003	Brad Hazzard	Liberal
2007	Brad Hazzard	Liberal
2011	Brad Hazzard	Liberal
2015	Brad Hazzard	Liberal
2019	Brad Hazzard	Liberal
2023	Michael Regan	Independent

== Election results ==
=== Elections in the 2020s ===
==== 2023 ====
2023 New South Wales state election: Wakehurst
Party	Candidate	Votes	%	±%
Liberal	Toby Williams	18,940	36.9	−23.0
Independent	Michael Regan	18,430	35.9	+35.9
Labor	Sue Wright	7,617	14.8	−2.1
Greens	Ethan Hrnjak	4,000	7.8	−2.4
Animal Justice	Susan Sorensen	1,220	2.4	−0.8
Sustainable Australia	Greg Mawson	1,127	2.2	−0.7
Total formal votes		51,334	97.4	+0.3
Informal votes		1,353	2.6	−0.3
Turnout		52,687	90.7	+2.1
Notional two-party-preferred count
Liberal	Toby Williams	23,685	59.6	−12.3
Labor	Sue Wright	16,054	40.4	+12.3
Two-candidate-preferred result
Independent	Michael Regan	24,589	54.5	+54.5
Liberal	Toby Williams	20,555	45.5	−26.4
Independent gain from Liberal				

=== Elections in the 2010s ===
==== 2019 ====
2019 New South Wales state election: Wakehurst
Party	Candidate	Votes	%	±%
Liberal	Brad Hazzard	28,704	58.93	−4.99
Labor	Chris Sharpe	8,600	17.65	+2.23
Greens	Lilith Zaharias	4,867	9.99	−1.97
Keep Sydney Open	Katika Schultz	1,928	3.96	+3.96
Animal Justice	Susan Sorensen	1,685	3.46	+3.46
Independent	Darren Hough	1,606	3.30	+3.30
Sustainable Australia	Greg Mawson	1,322	2.71	+2.71
Total formal votes		48,712	96.94	+0.39
Informal votes		1,537	3.06	−0.39
Turnout		50,249	90.03	−1.52
Two-party-preferred result
Liberal	Brad Hazzard	30,182	71.00	−4.24
Labor	Chris Sharpe	12,326	29.00	+4.24
Liberal hold		Swing	−4.24	

==== 2015 ====
2015 New South Wales state election: Wakehurst
Party	Candidate	Votes	%	±%
Liberal	Brad Hazzard	30,611	63.9	−5.5
Labor	Ned Barsi	7,387	15.4	+2.4
Greens	Jonathan King	5,727	12.0	−2.8
Independent	Conny Harris	2,057	4.3	+4.3
Christian Democrats	Silvana Nero	1,259	2.6	−0.2
No Land Tax	Robert Di Cosmo	853	1.8	+1.8
Total formal votes		47,894	96.5	+0.1
Informal votes		1,712	3.5	−0.1
Turnout		49,606	91.6	+0.5
Two-party-preferred result
Liberal	Brad Hazzard	32,105	75.2	−5.3
Labor	Ned Barsi	10,565	24.8	+5.3
Liberal hold		Swing	−5.3	

==== 2011 ====
2011 New South Wales state election: Wakehurst
Party	Candidate	Votes	%	±%
Liberal	Brad Hazzard	31,634	69.4	+12.5
Greens	Conny Harris	6,717	14.7	+2.1
Labor	Linda Beattie	5,930	13.0	−10.9
Christian Democrats	Peter Colsell	1,271	2.8	+2.8
Total formal votes		45,552	96.9	0.0
Informal votes		1,466	3.1	0.0
Turnout		47,018	92.9	
Notional two-party-preferred count
Liberal	Brad Hazzard	33,210	80.5	+13.2
Labor	Linda Beattie	8,021	19.5	−13.2
Two-candidate-preferred result
Liberal	Brad Hazzard	32,811	78.5	+11.2
Greens	Conny Harris	8,969	21.5	+21.5
Liberal hold		Swing	+11.2	

=== Elections in the 2000s ===
==== 2007 ====
2007 New South Wales state election: Wakehurst
Party	Candidate	Votes	%	±%
Liberal	Brad Hazzard	24,488	56.9	+8.9
Labor	Patricio Chavez	10,305	24.0	+0.3
Greens	Conny Harris	5,436	12.6	+2.2
Democrats	Georgina Johanson	1,528	3.6	+2.2
AAFI	Thomas Moody	1,249	2.9	+1.3
Total formal votes		43,006	96.9	+0.1
Informal votes		1,389	3.1	−0.1
Turnout		44,395	92.4	
Two-party-preferred result
Liberal	Brad Hazzard	25,980	67.3	+4.1
Labor	Patricio Chavez	12,628	32.7	−4.1
Liberal hold		Swing	+4.1	

==== 2003 ====
2003 New South Wales state election: Wakehurst
Party	Candidate	Votes	%	±%
Liberal	Brad Hazzard	18,584	47.2	−1.2
Labor	Chris Sharpe	9,416	23.9	−4.9
Independent	Vincent De Luca	4,485	11.4	+11.4
Greens	Peter Forrest	3,997	10.1	+3.5
Christian Democrats	Mike Hubbard	1,206	3.1	+3.1
Unity	Rita Lee	591	1.5	+1.5
AAFI	Anthony Mavin	591	1.5	−1.4
Democrats	Tony Howells	527	1.3	−5.2
Total formal votes		39,397	96.6	−0.4
Informal votes		1,387	3.4	+0.4
Turnout		40,784	91.2	
Two-party-preferred result
Liberal	Brad Hazzard	20,542	62.7	+1.9
Labor	Chris Sharpe	12,230	37.3	−1.9
Liberal hold		Swing	+1.9	

=== Elections in the 1990s ===
==== 1999 ====
1999 New South Wales state election: Wakehurst
Party	Candidate	Votes	%	±%
Liberal	Brad Hazzard	19,278	48.4	−7.3
Labor	Cherie Stokes	11,455	28.8	+1.3
One Nation	Ian Nelson	2,684	6.7	+6.7
Greens	Barbara Hatten	2,644	6.6	+5.1
Democrats	Gabrielle Russell	2,583	6.5	+1.0
AAFI	Alexander Hampel	1,172	2.9	−4.0
Total formal votes		39,816	97.0	+1.6
Informal votes		1,219	3.0	−1.6
Turnout		41,035	93.0	
Two-party-preferred result
Liberal	Brad Hazzard	21,225	60.8	−4.1
Labor	Cherie Stokes	13,713	39.2	+4.1
Liberal hold		Swing	−4.1	

==== 1995 ====
1995 New South Wales state election: Wakehurst
Party	Candidate	Votes	%	±%
Liberal	Brad Hazzard	18,524	54.5	−0.9
Labor	Patricia Armstrong	10,152	29.8	+3.8
AAFI	David Kitson	2,163	6.4	+6.4
Democrats	Sylvia Adam	1,880	5.5	−2.0
Call to Australia	Lesley Maher	820	2.4	+2.4
Natural Law	Catherine Webster	479	1.4	+1.4
Total formal votes		34,018	95.5	+4.8
Informal votes		1,592	4.5	−4.8
Turnout		35,610	93.5	
Two-party-preferred result
Liberal	Brad Hazzard	20,188	62.9	+0.2
Labor	Patricia Armstrong	11,899	37.1	−0.2
Liberal hold		Swing	+0.2	

==== 1991 ====
1991 New South Wales state election: Wakehurst
Party	Candidate	Votes	%	±%
Liberal	Brad Hazzard	17,161	55.3	+2.4
Labor	Anne Purcell	8,077	26.0	−6.4
Independent	Tim Maguire	3,435	11.1	+11.1
Democrats	Richard Hill	2,336	7.5	+7.4
Total formal votes		31,009	90.8	−5.6
Informal votes		3,155	9.2	+5.6
Turnout		34,164	92.1	
Two-party-preferred result
Liberal	Brad Hazzard	18,550	62.7	+3.2
Labor	Anne Purcell	11,048	37.3	−3.2
Liberal hold		Swing	+3.2	

=== Elections in the 1980s ===
==== 1988 ====
1988 New South Wales state election: Wakehurst
Party	Candidate	Votes	%	±%
Liberal	John Booth	15,013	52.2	+2.6
Labor	Tom Webster	10,022	34.9	−10.6
Independent	Michael Pawley	3,717	12.9	+12.9
Total formal votes		28,752	96.3	−1.3
Informal votes		1,090	3.7	+1.3
Turnout		29,842	92.7	
Two-party-preferred result
Liberal	John Booth	16,004	57.5	+5.5
Labor	Tom Webster	11,809	42.5	−5.5
Liberal hold		Swing	+5.5	

==== 1984 ====
1984 New South Wales state election: Wakehurst
Party	Candidate	Votes	%	±%
Liberal	John Booth	13,767	49.2	+7.6
Labor	Tom Webster	13,038	46.6	+8.7
Independent	Maurice Foley	606	2.2	+2.2
Democrats	Laurence Bourke	581	2.1	−1.0
Total formal votes		27,992	97.6	+0.6
Informal votes		680	2.4	−0.6
Turnout		28,672	91.6	+1.6
Two-party-preferred result
Liberal	John Booth		51.2	+8.2
Labor	Tom Webster		48.8	−8.2
Liberal gain from Labor		Swing	+8.2	

==== 1981 ====
1981 New South Wales state election: Wakehurst
Party	Candidate	Votes	%	±%
Labor	Tom Webster	14,891	55.3	−0.8
Liberal	Phillip Wearne	11,194	41.6	−2.3
Democrats	Henri Rathgeber	837	3.1	+3.1
Total formal votes		26,922	97.0	
Informal votes		833	3.0	
Turnout		27,755	90.0	
Two-party-preferred result
Labor	Tom Webster	15,098	57.0	+0.9
Liberal	Phillip Wearne	11,394	43.0	−0.9
Labor hold		Swing	+0.9	

=== Elections in the 1970s ===
==== 1978 ====
1978 New South Wales state election: Wakehurst
Party	Candidate	Votes	%	±%
Labor	Tom Webster	17,066	56.2	+14.0
Liberal	Allan Viney	13,329	43.8	−14.0
Total formal votes		30,395	97.0	−0.7
Informal votes		938	3.0	+0.7
Turnout		31,333	91.5	−0.2
Labor gain from Liberal		Swing	+14.0	

==== 1976 ====
1976 New South Wales state election: Wakehurst
Party	Candidate	Votes	%	±%
Liberal	Allan Viney	17,836	57.8	+4.4
Labor	Noel Berrell	12,999	42.2	+10.6
Total formal votes		30,835	97.7	+0.4
Informal votes		715	2.3	−0.4
Turnout		31,550	91.7	+1.3
Liberal hold		Swing	−3.6	

==== 1973 ====
1973 New South Wales state election: Wakehurst
Party	Candidate	Votes	%	±%
Liberal	Allan Viney	14,876	53.4	−0.9
Labor	Colin McIlwraith	8,801	31.6	−7.0
Australia	Pamela Wilson	2,770	9.9	+9.9
Democratic Labor	Terrence Fay	1,412	5.1	−2.0
Total formal votes		27,859	97.3	
Informal votes		782	2.7	
Turnout		28,641	90.4	
Two-party-preferred result
Liberal	Allan Viney	17,114	61.4	+1.4
Labor	Colin McIlwraith	10,745	38.6	−1.4
Liberal hold		Swing	+1.4	

==== 1971 ====
1971 New South Wales state election: Wakehurst
Party	Candidate	Votes	%	±%
Liberal	Allan Viney	15,074	52.3	−7.3
Labor	Evan Davies	11,706	40.6	+7.5
Democratic Labor	Kevin Lee	2,038	7.1	−0.2
Total formal votes		28,818	97.7	
Informal votes		664	2.3	
Turnout		29,482	93.0	
Two-party-preferred result
Liberal	Allan Viney	16,704	58.0	−7.5
Labor	Evan Davies	12,114	42.0	+7.5
Liberal hold		Swing	−7.5	

=== Elections in the 1960s ===
==== 1968 ====
1968 New South Wales state election: Wakehurst
Party	Candidate	Votes	%	±%
Liberal	Dick Healey	18,475	63.6	0.0
Labor	Dorothy Isaksen	8,442	29.1	−3.7
Democratic Labor	Lyle Antcliff	2,115	7.3	+7.3
Total formal votes		29,032	96.8	
Informal votes		965	3.2	
Turnout		29,997	95.0	
Two-party-preferred result
Liberal	Dick Healey	20,167	69.5	+3.0
Labor	Dorothy Isaksen	8,865	30.5	−3.0
Liberal hold		Swing	+3.0	

==== 1965 ====
1965 New South Wales state election: Wakehurst
Party	Candidate	Votes	%	±%
Liberal	Dick Healey	17,285	63.6	+11.9
Labor	Geoffrey Mill	8,912	32.8	−2.8
Independent	Frederick Jones	981	3.6	+3.6
Total formal votes		27,178	98.4	+0.5
Informal votes		434	1.6	−0.5
Turnout		27,612	92.7	−1.3
Two-party-preferred result
Liberal	Dick Healey	18,070	66.5	+7.6
Labor	Geoffrey Mill	9,108	33.5	−7.6
Liberal hold		Swing	+7.6	

==== 1962 ====
1962 New South Wales state election: Wakehurst
Party	Candidate	Votes	%	±%
Liberal	Dick Healey	11,689	51.7	−9.4
Labor	John Fisher	8,062	35.6	−3.3
Independent	Edgar Wilson	1,440	6.4	+6.4
Independent	Beverley Job	792	3.5	+3.5
Democratic Labor	Philip Cohen	638	2.8	+2.8
Total formal votes		22,621	97.9	
Informal votes		491	2.1	
Turnout		23,112	94.0	
Two-party-preferred result
Liberal	Dick Healey	13,315	58.9	−2.2
Labor	John Fisher	9,306	41.1	+2.2
Liberal notional hold		Swing		

- Wakehurst was a new seat that was notionally a safe Liberal seat.
