= 1992 in Australia =

- Monarch: Elizabeth II
- Governor-General: Bill Hayden
- Prime minister: Paul Keating
- Population: 17,494,664
- Elections: TAS, ACT, QLD, VIC

The following is a list of events that happened during the year 1992 in Australia.

- Decades: 1970s; 1980s; 1990s; 2000s; 2010s
- See also: 1992 in Australian television; 1992 in Australian literature; Other events of 1992; Timeline of Australian history

== Incumbents ==
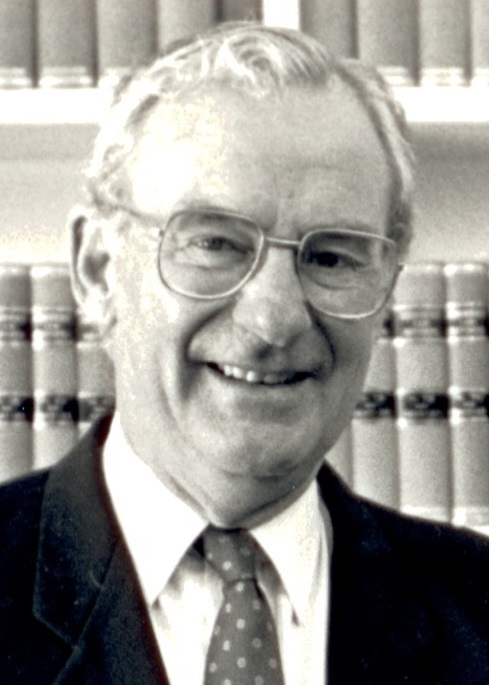
Bill Hayden

Paul Keating

- Monarch – Elizabeth II
- Governor-General – Bill Hayden
- Prime Minister – Paul Keating
  - Deputy Prime Minister – Brian Howe
  - Opposition Leader – John Hewson
- Chief Justice – Sir Anthony Mason

=== State and territory leaders ===
- Premier of New South Wales – Nick Greiner (until 24 June), then John Fahey
  - Opposition Leader – Bob Carr
- Premier of Queensland – Wayne Goss
  - Opposition Leader – Rob Borbidge
- Premier of South Australia – John Bannon (until 4 September), then Lynn Arnold
  - Opposition Leader – Dale Baker (until 11 May), then Dean Brown
- Premier of Tasmania – Michael Field (until 17 February), then Ray Groom
  - Opposition Leader – Ray Groom (until 17 February), then Michael Field
- Premier of Victoria – Joan Kirner (until 6 October), then Jeff Kennett
  - Opposition Leader – Jeff Kennett (until 6 October), then Joan Kirner
- Premier of Western Australia – Carmen Lawrence
  - Opposition Leader – Barry MacKinnon (until 12 May), then Richard Court
- Chief Minister of the Australian Capital Territory – Rosemary Follett
  - Opposition Leader – Trevor Kaine
- Chief Minister of the Northern Territory – Marshall Perron
  - Opposition Leader – Brian Ede
- President of the Legislative Assembly/Head of Government of Norfolk Island – David Buffett (until 20 May), then John Brown

=== Governors and administrators ===
- Governor of New South Wales – Peter Sinclair
- Governor of Queensland – Sir Walter Campbell (until 29 July), then Leneen Forde
- Governor of South Australia – Dame Roma Mitchell
- Governor of Tasmania – Sir Phillip Bennett
- Governor of Victoria – Davis McCaughey (until 22 April), then Richard McGarvie
- Governor of Western Australia – Sir Francis Burt
- Administrator of Norfolk Island – Herbert MacDonald (until 12 April), then Alan Kerr
- Administrator of the Northern Territory – James Muirhead

== Events ==
=== January ===
- 2 January – George H. W. Bush becomes the first President of the United States to address the Australian Parliament.
- 18 January – The Labor Party wins a by-election in the central coast seat of The Entrance.
- 22 January – The Queensland Criminal Justice Commission announces that it won't release names of MPs who rort travel expenses.
- 26 January – Prime Minister Paul Keating gives his Australia Day address in Canberra, saying that Australia must adapt to a changing world and look to Asia if it was to survive economically.
- 28 January – Colin White and David Trimmer are charged over their alleged involvement in a multimillion-dollar tobacco scam in Brisbane.
- 29 January – New South Wales Premier Nick Greiner calls for a controversial sex education book, funded by the Federal Government, to be destroyed.

=== February ===
- 1 February –
  - A general election is held in Tasmania.
  - One and two-cent coins begin to be withdrawn from circulation.
- 6 February – Ruby Jubilee of Elizabeth II's accession as Queen of Australia
- 9 February – Flooding occurs in Sydney and other areas of New South Wales. Torrential rain also floods the Sydney Harbour Tunnel with 500,000 litres of water.
- 11 February – The inaugural meeting of the Grayndler Young Labor meeting in Alfred Frede Hall in the Sydney suburb of Marrickville is disrupted by 20 youths. During an incident involving the attempted theft of the official ticket book, Assistant State Secretary Anthony Albanese is allegedly threatened with a knife attack.
- 15 February – The second ACT Legislative Assembly election is held, re-electing the Labor minority government of Rosemary Follett.
- 20 February – Scores of people flee their homes as several coastal towns north of Brisbane are hit by flash floods.
- 21 February – A State of Emergency is declared in Maryborough and Gympie due to major flooding.
- 22 February –
  - After trialling Daylight Saving in Queensland for a total of three years, a referendum is held, with 54.5% of Queenslanders voting against daylight saving. Regional and rural areas strongly oppose daylight saving, while those in the metropolitan south-east vote in favour of it.
  - A state of emergency is declared in the whole of Noosa Shire, Queensland due to major flooding – the worst since 1968.
- 24 February – Queen Elizabeth II visits Australia. Prime Minister Paul Keating breaks royal protocol by placing his hand on the Queen's back, causing an outraged British tabloid newspaper to dub him the "Lizard of Oz". In his speech welcoming the Queen, Paul Keating contrasts the current state of Australia with that of her first visit in 1954.
- 26 February – Prime Minister Paul Keating's long-awaited economic statement One Nation is delivered. Federal Opposition Leader John Hewson describes it as porkbarrelling.

=== April ===
- 11 April – Independent candidate Phil Cleary wins the 1992 Wills by-election which was brought about by the resignation of Bob Hawke. Former Prime Minister Malcolm Fraser attributes the result in part to revulsion against the "alien creed" of economic rationalism.
- 25 April – Prime Minister Paul Keating kisses the ground at Kokoda, Papua New Guinea, declaring that it, not Gallipoli, is the birthplace of Australian nationalism.
- 28 April – National Party frontbencher Ray Braithwaite resigns over Fightback!'s zero tariff policy on sugar.

=== May ===
- 2 May – New South Wales Liberal MP Andrew Humpherson wins the 1992 Davidson state by-election.
- 18 May – Social Security Minister Graham Richardson resigns after a month of disclosures on his interventions on a friend's behalf in the "Marshall Islands affair".
- 25 May – Lindy Chamberlain receives compensation for wrongful conviction on murder charges.

=== June ===
- 3 June – The High Court of Australia decides the case of Mabo v Queensland (No 2), a landmark decision recognising native title in Australia. The decision overturns the concept of Australia as an unoccupied land (terra nullius) at the time of British settlement.
- 24 June – Nick Greiner resigns as Premier of New South Wales in the wake of a corruption scandal, and is replaced by John Fahey.

=== July ===
- 1 July - Compulsory superannuation comes into effect.
- 7 July - The paper $5 note issued from 1967 was replaced by a polymer note.
- 31 July – Janet Powell resigns from the Australian Democrats, sitting henceforth as an Independent Senator. The Victorian branch of the Democrats fractures acrimoniously, damaging the party nationally.

=== August ===
- 11 August – A meeting with Prime Minister Paul Keating fails to secure for the Greens commitments on global warming, endangered species protection and biodiversity.
- 18 August – Budget expenditure promises on labour market and training programmes and reducing the sizeable deficit fail to halt the Keating Government's sliding popularity.
- 30 August – Representatives from the Tasmanian, Queensland and New South Wales Greens, with observers from other states, form the Australian Greens Party at a Sydney meeting.

=== September ===
- 4 September – Lynn Arnold becomes Premier of South Australia after the resignation of John Bannon after the near-collapse of the State Bank.
- 7 September – The National Party of Queensland launches its state election campaign in Brisbane with strong support for law and order issues.
- 8 September–
  - Prime Minister Paul Keating warns President George Bush that wheat subsidies are corroding public support in Australia for the United States.
  - The Afghan Foreign Minister arrives in Sydney to appeal for urgent assistance.
- 19 September – A state election is held in Queensland. The Labor government of Wayne Goss is returned to power.
- 30 September – The High Court of Australia invalidates legislation passed in December 1991 banning political advertising on the electronic media in the run-up to state and federal elections.

=== October ===
- 3 October – A state election is held in Victoria. Joan Kirner's Labor government is defeated by Jeff Kennett's Liberal party.
- 6 October – Rose Hancock – Porteous is fined $1,000 in Perth for forging prescriptions for drugs.
- 19 October – One of the two men charged with the murder of Dr. Victor Chang pleads guilty.
- 20 October –
  - The trial of the second man accused of murdering Dr. Victor Chang begins.
  - The Federal Opposition unveils Jobsback, its industrial relations policy designed to move from centralised wage-fixing to individual employment contracts negotiated at the enterprise level.
- 27 October – Senator Bronwyn Bishop attacks the Tax Commissioner over alleged special treatment to the Labor Party.
- 30 October – The second man charged with the murder of Dr. Victor Chang, Phillip Lim, is found guilty.

=== November ===
- 5 November – Prime Minister Paul Keating announces that the coming election would be a poll on the Goods and Services Tax (GST) and pledged that if the Coalition won, Labor would allow the GST through the Senate.
- 19 November – With the implications of Fightback! increasingly scrutinised and condemned, and elements in the Coalition "panicking", Federal Opposition Leader John Hewson declares that he would resign rather than abandon the GST.
- 23 November – Prime Minister Paul Keating announces the end of the ban preventing homosexual men and women from serving in the Australian Defence Force
- 25 November – The High Court of Australia rules that Independent Phil Cleary had been ineligible to stand for Wills as he was an Education Department employee on unpaid leave ("officers of the Crown" cannot stand for Parliament). His Labor and Liberal opponents were also declared ineligible, as they both held dual citizenship.

=== December ===
- 18 December – Federal Opposition Leader John Hewson unveils Fightback Mark II which includes abandoning the GST on basic food items and childcare and the threat to cut off the dole after 9 months.
- 22 December – The men who murdered heart surgeon Dr. Victor Chang are each sentenced to 20 years jail.
- Adelaide receives it highest annual rainfall on record, totalling 883.2 millimetres (34.77 in).

=== Full date unknown ===
- Norgate Data, a data service business, is founded.

== Arts and literature ==
- 26 January – The first Big Day Out music festival is held at the Sydney Showground, headlined by Violent Femmes and Nirvana.
- Tim Winton's novel Cloudstreet wins the Miles Franklin Award
- The first WOMADelaide is held at Botanic Park as part of the Adelaide Festival of Arts. It featured Nusrat Fateh Ali Khan, Youssou N'Dour, Trio Bulgarka and Martenitsa, Archie Roach, Crowded House & Penguin Café Orchestra

== Film ==
- 23 January – Spotswood
- 20 August – Strictly Ballroom
- 12 November – Romper Stomper

== Television ==
- 1 January – The Victorian television market is aggregated, with VIC TV (now WIN Television) becoming the Nine Network affiliate, Prime Television taking a Seven Network affiliation & Southern Cross Network (now Southern Cross Ten) taking the Network Ten affiliation.
- 4 September – Kerry Packer pulls the plug on Australia's Naughtiest Home Videos mid-air.
- 20 July – ABC debuts children's TV series Bananas in Pyjamas.
- Ending this year were:
  - November – Fast Forward (program comes back as Full Frontal in 1993)
  - November – Acropolis Now
  - The Big Gig (1989–1992) on ABC

== Sport ==
- 22 February – 25 March – The 1992 Cricket World Cup is held in Australia and New Zealand. Pakistan defeats England in the final at the MCG by 22 runs.
- 5 March – First day of the Australian Track & Field Championships for the 1991–1992 season, which are held at the Olympic Sports Field in Adelaide, South Australia.
- 25 March – Great Southern Stand opened at the MCG by Donald Cordner, then-President of the Melbourne Cricket Club.
- 6 April – Peter Sterling announces his retirement from rugby league due to injury
- 3 May
  - Adelaide City win the NSL Grand Final on Penalties after a scoreless draw with Melbourne Croatia at Olympic Park
  - Geelong kick the highest VFL/AFL score against the Brisbane Bears of 37.17.239
- 7 May – Exactly 100 years to the day of their first senior-level match, Collingwood meets Carlton in a rematch of that game at the MCG. Carlton wins by 33 points.
- 18 May – Auckland (now New Zealand) Warriors admitted to 1995 ARL premiership. North Queensland, South Queensland & Perth all admitted later, forming 20-team comp.
- 12 July – Gerard Barrett wins the men's national marathon title, clocking 2:16:46 in Brisbane, while Jennifer Dowie claims the women's title in 2:40:40.
- 26 September – West Coast Eagles (16.17.113) defeat Geelong (12.13.85) in the first non-Melbourne –only Grand Final, to win the 96th AFL premiership. It is the first time that the VFL/AFL premiership has left Victoria.
- 27 September – Brisbane Broncos (28) defeat St. George Dragons (8) to win the 85th NSWRL premiership. It is the first time that the NSWRL premiership has gone to Queensland. Broncos halfback Allan Langer is awarded the Clive Churchill medal for man of the match. Gold Coast Seagulls finish in last position, claiming the wooden spoon for the second year in a row.
- 30 October – NSWRL premiers Brisbane Broncos defeat RFL champions Wigan 22–8 in the 1992 World Club Challenge, held in Wigan, England. It is the first Australian victory on British soil since Eastern Suburbs Roosters' win in the inaugural 1976 match.
- Brownlow Medal awarded to Scott Wynd (Footscray)

== Births ==
- 2 January – Isabella Holland, tennis player
- 18 January – Cheyse Blair, rugby league player
- 20 January
  - Ben Kantarovski, footballer (soccer) player
  - Alex Keath, cricketer
- 24 January – Luke Russell, footballer
- 25 January – Casey Dumont, footballer (soccer) player
- 28 January – Jennifer Bisset, footballer (soccer) player
- 30 January – Matthew Werkmeister, stage and television actor
- 31 January – Tahnee Atkinson, model
- 3 February – Luke Keary, rugby league player
- 8 February – Lee Cormie, actor
- 9 February
  - Valentina Barron, actress
  - Kyle Feldt, rugby league player
  - Mitchell Frei, rugby league player
- 12 February – James Jeggo, footballer (soccer) player
- 13 February –
  - Chris Bush, footballer
  - Jake Batchelor, footballer
  - Nick Fitzgerald, footballer
- 16 February – Danielle Catanzariti, actress
- 20 February – Kyle Turner, rugby league player (died 2023)
- 21 February – Eli Babalj, footballer
- 23 February
  - Corey Adamson, baseball player
  - Samara Weaving, actress
- 29 February – Sean Abbott, cricketer
- 2 March – Kerem Bulut, footballer
- 3 March – Jordy Lucas, actress
- 13 March – Lucy Fry, actress
- 16 March – Sam Gallaway, footballer (soccer) player
- 22 March – Mitchell Mallia, footballer (soccer) player
- 23 March – Kyrie Irving, basketball player
- 24 March – Jenna Kingsley, footballer (soccer) player
- 2 April – Kurt Aylett, footballer
- 7 April – Petar Franjic, footballer (soccer) player
- 8 April – Mathew Ryan, footballer
- 10 April – Chaz Mostert, racing driver
- 18 April - Adam Cooper, footballer.
- 18 April – Alexandra Adornetto, author of three children's books in a trilogy, The Strangest Adventures, and one young adult book, Halo.
- 22 April – Angela Fimmano, footballer
- 27 April – Mitch Creek, basketballer
- 3 May – Melissa Wu, diver
- 4 May – Shannon Lively, actor
- 9 May – Will Hopoate, rugby league player
- 11 May – Lawrence Thomas, footballer
- 14 May – Dyson Heppell, footballer
- 16 May – Tom Liberatore, footballer
- 19 May – Cassi Van Den Dungen, model
- 20 May – Cate Campbell, swimmer
- 27 May – Ruth Blackburn, footballer
- 1 June
  - Jenna McDougall, singer-songwriter (Tonight Alive)
  - Amanda Ware, model
- 3 June – Matt Acton, footballer
- 4 June – Morgan Griffin, actress
- 5 June
  - Sam Rainbird, cricketer
  - Emily Seebohm, swimmer
- 8 June – Alex Fasolo, footballer
- 9 June – Boyd Cordner, rugby league player
- 13 June
  - Jack Darling, footballer
  - Joey Gibbs, footballer (soccer) player
- 14 June – Ben Halloran, footballer
- 16 June – Andrew Gaff, footballer
- 29 June – Ryan Battaglia, baseball player
- 7 July – Jack Le Brocq, racing driver
- 12 July – Larrissa Miller, gymnast
- 14 July – Chris Harold, football striker
- 16 July – Sam Naismith, Australian rules footballer
- 17 July
  - Joe Costa, footballer (soccer) player
  - Tom Eisenhuth, rugby league footballer
- 20 July – Jordan Rodrigues, actor
- 21 July – Marcus Harris, cricketer
- 26 July – Kamal Ibrahim, footballer
- 27 July – Alex Apollonov, YouTube personality
- 28 July – Bailey Wright, footballer
- 13 August –
  - Jenny-Lyn Anderson, South Africa-born swimmer
  - Katrina Gorry, footballer (soccer) player
- 19 August – Cameron Guthrie, footballer
- 1 September – Ben Jacobs, footballer
- 2 September – Valentina Barron, actress
- 7 September – Martin Hinteregger, footballer
- 12 September – Bernie Ibini-Isei, Nigeria-born footballer
- 13 September – Shaun Atley, footballer
- 18 September
  - Brendan Hamill, footballer
  - Edrick Lee, rugby league player
- 28 September – Josh Caddy, footballer
- 30 September – Elyse Knowles, model
- 2 October – Harley Bennell, footballer
- 7 October – Grace Bawden, opera singer
- 27 October – Charles Cottier, actor
- 2 November – Katie Daly, footballer (soccer) player
- 6 November – Rebecca Allen, basketball player
- 12 November – Giulietta, singer-songwriter and dancer
- 19 November – Cameron Bancroft, cricketer
- 29 November – Sophie Letcher, tennis player
- 12 December – Marco Djuricin, footballer
- 17 December – Jordan Coulter, model
- 22 December
  - George Horlin-Smith, footballer
  - Shiori Kutsuna, Australian-Japanese actress

== Deaths ==
- 3 January – Dame Judith Anderson, actress (died in the United States) (b. 1897)
- 27 March – Lang Hancock, iron ore magnate (b. 1909)
- 14 April – Irene Greenwood, radio broadcaster, feminist and peace activist (b. 1898)
- 7 June – Georges Mora, entrepreneur and arts patron (born in Germany) (b. 1913)
- 15 June – Brett Whiteley, artist (b. 1939)
- 18 June – Peter Allen, musician (b. 1944)
- 21 June – Arthur Gorrie, hobby shop owner (b. 1922)
- 27 July – Max Dupain, photographer (b. 1911)
- 28 August – Sir Tom Drake-Brockman, Western Australian politician (b. 1919)
- 6 October – Bill O'Reilly, cricketer (b. 1905)
- 28 November – Sidney Nolan, artist (died in the United Kingdom) (b. 1917)

== See also ==
- 1992 in Australian television
- List of Australian films of 1992
