= Brad Hazzard =

New South Wales politician

The Honourable Brad Hazzard
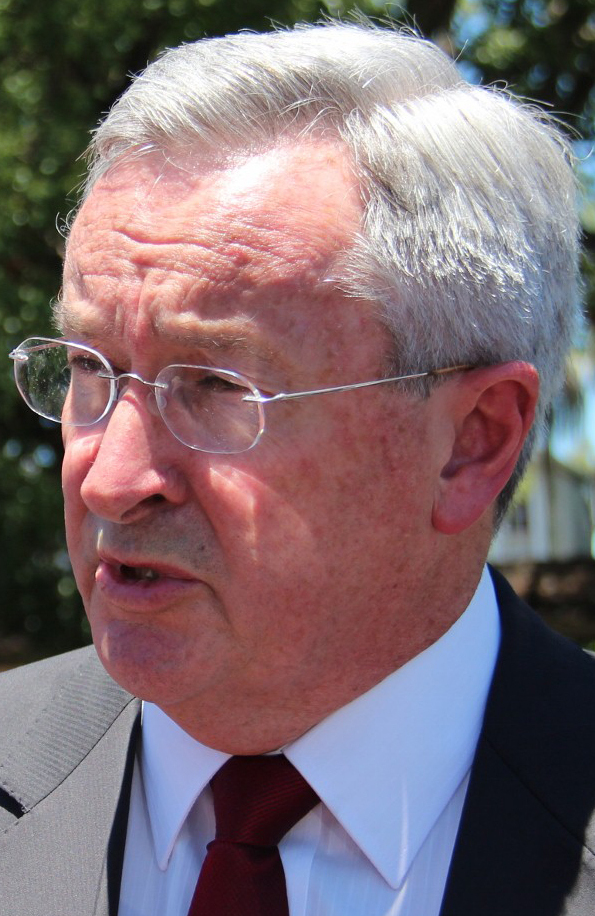

Minister for Health
- In office 30 January 2017 – 28 March 2023
- Premier: Gladys Berejiklian; Dominic Perrottet
- Preceded by: Jillian Skinner
- Succeeded by: Ryan Park

Minister for Medical Research
- In office 30 January 2017 – 21 December 2021
- Premier: Gladys Berejiklian; Dominic Perrottet
- Preceded by: Pru Goward
- Succeeded by: Alister Henskens (as Minister for Science, Innovation and Technology)
Minister 2011–2017
Minister for Family and Community Services
In office 2 April 2015 – 23 January 2017
Premier	Mike Baird
Preceded by	Gabrielle Upton
Succeeded by	Pru Goward
Minister for Social Housing
In office 2 April 2015 – 23 January 2017
Premier	Mike Baird
Preceded by	Gabrielle Upton (as Minister for Families and Community Services)
Succeeded by	Pru Goward
Attorney General of New South Wales
In office 23 April 2014 – 2 April 2015
Premier	Mike Baird
Preceded by	Greg Smith
Succeeded by	Gabrielle Upton
Minister for Justice
In office 23 April 2014 – 2 April 2015
Premier	Mike Baird
Preceded by	Greg Smith
Succeeded by	Troy Grant (Justice and Police); David Elliott (Corrections)
Minister for Planning and Infrastructure
In office 3 April 2011 – 23 April 2014
Premier	Barry O'Farrell
Preceded by	Tony Kelly
Succeeded by	Pru Goward (Planning); Mike Baird (Infrastructure)

Member of the New South Wales Parliament for Wakehurst
- In office 25 May 1991 – 25 March 2023
- Preceded by: John Booth
- Succeeded by: Michael Regan

Personal details
- Born: 30 August 1951 (age 75) Sydney
- Party: Liberal Party
- Spouse: Nicole Hazzard (m. 2020)
- Children: 2
- Education: University of Sydney; University of New South Wales; Macquarie University
- Occupation: Solicitor; Teacher
- Website: Brad Hazzard MP webpage

Bradley Ronald "Brad" Hazzard (born 30 August 1951) is a retired Australian politician who served as the member of the New South Wales Legislative Assembly district of Wakehurst between May 1991 and March 2023.

A member of the Liberal Party, Hazzard has also served as the Minister for Planning and Infrastructure and the Minister Assisting the Premier on Infrastructure NSW in the O'Farrell government between 2011 and 2014; as the Attorney General of New South Wales and the Minister for Justice between 2014 and 2015 in the first Baird ministry; as the Minister for Family and Community Services and the Minister for Social Housing between April 2015 and January 2017 in the second Baird government; and as the Minister for Health between January 2017 and March 2023 in the Berejiklian and Perrottet ministries.

== Background and early career ==
Hazzard was educated at Manly Boys' High School (now Manly Selective Campus), Macquarie University where he gained a Bachelor of Arts (Science) and a Diploma of Education, the University of New South Wales where he graduated Bachelor of Laws, and the University of Sydney where he graduated Master of Laws. Hazzard was then employed as a science teacher (1974–1977) before being admitted as a solicitor in 1977. He was a partner in a Manly law firm from 1981 to 1996.

== Political career ==
In 1983, Hazzard joined the Liberal Party and quickly rose through the ranks, becoming regional president and a member of the state executive from 1985 to 1986. Hazzard was pre-selected as Liberal Party candidate for Wakehurst in April 1991, ahead of the sitting Liberal Party member John Booth. He was elected to NSW Legislative Assembly in 1991 and sat in the backbench during the Greiner and Fahey governments.

Hazzard played a role in the "Metherell affair", involving the neighbouring Member for Davidson, Terry Metherell, who upon his resignation from the Liberal Party had expressed to Hazzard his interest in one of the Directorships at the new Environmental Protection Authority. Hazzard discussed this with Premier Greiner and the Minister for the Environment, Tim Moore, at Greiner's residence in February 1992. Greiner and Hazzard then discussed the matter with Metherell while in Parliament ten days later.

The government subsequently created the job for Metherell, which he accepted, effectively engineering a vacancy in a seat that the Liberal Party would recover at a by-election. At the May 1992 by-election the Labor Party did not nominate a candidate, and a field of Independents and minor parties reduced the Liberal vote by 16 points (14 points after preferences), nevertheless won by Liberal candidate Andrew Humpherson.

=== NSW Opposition ===
After the Labor Party won the 1995 election, Hazzard was appointed to the Opposition frontbench and held various shadow portfolios. Under Opposition Leader Peter Collins, Hazzard was Shadow Minister for Corrective and Emergency Services (1995–1996), Environment (1996–1997), Aboriginal Affairs (1996–2007), and Sport and Recreation (1997–1999)

Under Kerry Chikarovski he was Shadow Minister for Housing (1999–2000), Corrective Services (1999–2000), Disability Services and Ageing (2000–2003), and Community Services (2000–2003). Under John Brogden he was Shadow Minister for Energy and Utilities (2003–2005), Science and Medical Research (2003–2005), Youth (2005), and Community Services (2005).

Under Peter Debnam and Barry O'Farrell he was Shadow Minister for Education (2005–2007) and was made Shadow Minister for Redfern Waterloo (2007–2008). He was also appointed Shadow Minister for Planning (2008–2011) and Shadow Minister for Infrastructure (2008–2011). Between 2007 and 2011 Hazzard criticised the State Labor Government's move to take planning powers away from Local government and handing them to government-appointed planning panels and their attitudes towards development of heritage areas.

=== NSW Government ===
In April 2011 Hazzard was appointed Minister for Planning and Infrastructure and Minister Assisting the Premier on Infrastructure NSW. He also served as Leader of the Legislative Assembly from April 2011 to April 2014.

Due to the resignation of Barry O'Farrell as Premier, and the subsequent ministerial reshuffle by Mike Baird, the new Liberal Leader, in April 2014 Hazzard was sworn in as the Attorney General and as the Minister for Justice; and lost the portfolio of Planning and Infrastructure. In April 2015, following the 2015 state election, Hazzard was sworn in as the Minister for Family and Community Services and the Minister for Social Housing in the second Baird ministry.

Following the resignation of Baird as Premier, Gladys Berejiklian was elected as Liberal leader and sworn in as Premier. The Berejiklian ministry was subsequently formed with Hazzard sworn in as the Minister for Health and the Minister for Medical Research with effect from 30 January 2017. Following the 2019 state election the two portfolios were merged as the Minister for Health and Medical Research. In December 2021, Hazzard was sworn in as the Minister for Health, with the responsibilities of the Office of Medical Research transferred to the Minister for Science, Innovation and Technology, Alister Henskens.

On 25 October 2022, Hazzard announced his retirement from politics ahead of the 2023 state election.

== Personal life ==
Hazzard has two adult sons. Hazzard married his second wife Nicole in February 2020.

== Policies and beliefs ==
In August 2019, Brad Hazzard came out in support of removing abortion as a criminal offence (after 119 years within the NSW Crimes Act 1900 section(s) 82–84) via a bill he co-sponsored with 14 others of all different political parties and independents. The bill passed the parliament on 26 September 2019. Hazzard also supported proposals to ban the controversial practice of conversion therapy at a state and national level, however, as of May 2025 a bill had not yet been introduced.

== See also ==
- Shadow Ministry of Barry O'Farrell
- O'Farrell ministry
- First Baird ministry
- Second Baird ministry
- First Berejiklian ministry
- Second Berejiklian ministry
- Perrottet ministry

New South Wales Legislative Assembly
Preceded by John Booth	Member for Wakehurst; 1991–2023	Succeeded by Michael Regan
Political offices
Preceded by Tony Kelly	Minister for Planning and Infrastructure; 2011–2014	Succeeded by Pru Goward as Minister for Planning
Preceded by Tony Kelly	Minister for Planning and Infrastructure; 2011–2014	Succeeded by Mike Baird as Minister for Infrastructure
Preceded by Greg Smith	Attorney General of New South Wales; 2014–2015	Succeeded by Gabrielle Upton
Preceded by Greg Smith	Minister for Justice; 2014–2015	Succeeded by Troy Grant as Minister for Justice and Police
Preceded by Greg Smith	Minister for Justice; 2014–2015	Succeeded by David Elliott as Minister for Corrections
Preceded by Gabrielle Upton	Minister for Family and Community Services; 2015–2017	Succeeded by Pru Goward
Vacant Title last held by Frank Terenzini as Minister for Housing	Minister for Social Housing; 2015–2017	Succeeded by Pru Goward
Preceded by Jillian Skinner	Minister for Health; 2017–2023	Succeeded by Ryan Park
Preceded by Pru Goward	Minister for Medical Research; 2017–2021	Succeeded by Alister Henskens as Minister for Science, Innovation and Technology
