= John David Booth =

Australian politician

John David Booth (4 November 1950 – 17 November 2011) was a Liberal Party member of the New South Wales Legislative Assembly, representing the electorate of Wakehurst from 24 March 1984 to 3 May 1991.

Born in 1950, Booth was educated at Gordon West Public School and Sydney Church of England Grammar School. After graduating high school he attended the University of Sydney, while resident in St Paul's College, where he graduated with Bachelor of Arts and Bachelor of Laws degrees. Booth joined the Liberal Party in 1969 while at university and became the president of the Sydney University Liberal Club (1971–1972) and rose to be Federal President Australian University Liberal Federation from 1972 to 1974. Booth was then employed as the research officer to Senator Sir John Carrick (1975–1981) and as a pilot officer in the Royal Australian Air Force Reserve (1972–1975).

Booth stood as a candidate for the 1982 Drummoyne by-election where he secured a 13.7% swing against the Labor candidate. This result was interpreted by some as a rebuke against the Wran Government, which had been crippled by electricity blackouts and rationing. After the by-election Booth was employed as political adviser to the Leader of the New South Wales Opposition, John Dowd, from 1982 to 1983.

In November 1981, Terry Metherell convened a meeting of like-minded members of the NSW Liberal Party at the Don Quixote restaurant in Sussex Street Sydney. They were younger members within the NSW Liberal Party disillusioned by numerous electoral defeats at the hands of the Labor Party led by Neville Wran. The guest list read like a "who's who" of the eventual NSW Liberal Government led by Nick Greiner. Around the table were John Dowd, Chris Hartcher, Andrew Tink, Phillip Smiles, Paul Zammit, John Hannaford and John Booth. Booth was pre-selected as the Liberal candidate for the state seat of Wakehurst in 1983, and was elected to the NSW Legislative Assembly at the 1984 election, defeating Labor member Tom Webster. The seat was ancestrally Liberal, but was one of several "blue ribbon" seats swept up in the "Wranslide" of 1978. However, Booth not only returned the seat to the Liberals, but came a few hundred votes short of a majority on the first count.

In Parliament, Booth served on the Public Accounts Committee and retained his seat at the 1988 election. While as member for Wakehurst Booth was appointed as a Fellow of the Sydney University Senate (1988–1991), a member of Cromer Public School Parents & Citizens and Dee Why Public School Parents & Citizens Associations. He also served as president of the New South Wales Parliamentary Group of Amnesty International from 1986, as the patron of the Manly-Warringah Branch of Surf Life Saving Australia and maintained associations with Mona Vale Hospital, Manly District Hospital as well as local scout groups. Booth served until he lost pre-selection for his seat prior to the 1991 election, in favour of Brad Hazzard. Despite this political setback, Booth remained active in the Liberal Party.

Booth died suddenly in Sydney on 17 November 2011. His funeral was held at the Chapel of St Paul's College, University of Sydney. Booth had been long-serving member of the College Council and had been actively engaged in many areas of college life since his arrival as a freshman in 1969.

== Notes ==
New South Wales Legislative Assembly
Preceded by Tom Webster	Member for Wakehurst; 1984–1991	Succeeded by Brad Hazzard
