= Matthew Cross =

Matthew Cross can refer to:

- Matthew Cross (cricketer) (born 1992), Scottish cricketer
- Matthew Cross (rugby league) (born 1981), Australian rugby league player
- Matt Cross (wrestler) (born 1980), American wrestler
- Matt Cross (politician), Australian politician
- Matt Cross (basketball), American basketball player
