= Drummoyne Boys' High School =

Location
- Drummoyne, New South Wales; Australia
- Coordinates: 33°51′28.88″S 151°8′50.77″E

Information
- Type: Public, single-sex, secondary school
- Motto: Latin: Vincit qui se Vincit (he conquers who conquers himself)
- Established: 1940
- Status: Closed
- Closed: 1990
- Campus: Mary Street, Drummoyne
- Colours: Red and blue

Drummoyne Boys' High School (abbreviation:DBHS) is a former high school in the inner western Sydney suburb of Drummoyne, New South Wales, Australia. It was a boys high school operated by the New South Wales Department of Education and Training with students from years 7 to 12. The school was established in 1940. However, due to declining enrolments the school was declared surplus to the needs of the department in 1989 and was officially closed in 1990. The historic original buildings are now the site of The Village by Scalabrini, Drummoyne.

== Closure ==
Drummoyne Boys' High School's enrolment levels declined from 514 students in 1983 to 120 students when it closed at the end of 1990. These remaining students were accommodated in Concord High School, Balmain High School and Hunters Hill High School. After the high school closed the premises were used for the storage of furniture and equipment in relation to the Department's Distance Education Program. However, when even this was not necessary, the school was declared surplus to the needs of the department and sold.

The closure of Drummoyne Boys' attracted severe criticism from the NSW Teachers Federation and the local member for Drummoyne, The Hon. John Murray MLA, who disclaimed in the NSW legislative assembly on 22 October 1991: "I draw the attention of the House to a complete waste of taxpayers' money on a classic example of the failure of this Government's schools closure program, which has developed into a fiasco in the Drummoyne area. Honourable members will recall my protests in the past two and a half years against the Government's plans to close Drummoyne Boys High School. Unfortunately my pleas fell on deaf ears."

The historic original buildings were the site of the Wesley Institute (now Excelsia College) while the playing fields were developed into housing.

== Notable alumni ==
- Don Cameron – 1988 Olympian and Head Coach of the Australia Men's Water Polo Team, Sydney 2000
- Jim Conomos – former Crown Prosecutor (1977–1985) and Judge of the District Court of New South Wales (1985–1993)
- Peter Andrikidis – Australian film and television director, and producer
- Michael G. Lambert – public servant and Secretary of the NSW Treasury (1994–1997)
- Peter Lockwood – former member of the Victorian Legislative Assembly for Bayswater (2002–2006)
- Daniel Marsden – 2000 Olympic Games Captain, Australian Men's Water Polo Team
- Bruce McDonald AM – former Leader of the Opposition of New South Wales (1981)
- Tom Pauling AO, QC – former Administrator of the Northern Territory (2007–2011)
- Trevor Haines AO, QC – former Under Secretary of Justice of NSW (1970–1989)
- Tom Webster – former member of the New South Wales Legislative Assembly for Wakehurst (1978–1984) and Councillor on Warringah Council (1991–1999)
