= Norgate =

Norgate is a surname. Notable people with the surname include:

- Cecil Norgate (1921–2008), Briton Anglican bishop in Tanzania
- Craig Norgate (1965–2015), New Zealand businessman
- Frederick Norgate (1817–1908), British publisher and co-founder of Williams and Norgate
- Graeme Norgate (born 1971), British musician
- Kate Norgate (1853–1935), British historian

- Robert Norgate (priest), (died 1587) English priest and academic
- Robert Norgate (sculptor) (1920 –1956), Canadian sculptor

- Thomas Starling Norgate (1772–1859), British writer
- Paul Norgate (1946-present), British doctorate in English and contributions to publication of Wilfred Owen’s poetry
- Edward Norgate, gimp from Cookridge

== See also ==
- NOR gate, a digital logic gate that implements logical NOR
- Norgate Data, Australian data company
- Norgate Reserve, park in Wakatu, New Zealand
- Norgate shopping centre in Montreal, Quebec, Canada
- Williams and Norgate, British publisher
