= Barton Deakin =

Government relations and lobbying firm

- Founder: Peter Collins
- Type: Government relations and lobbying firm
- Purpose: Works with Coalition governments and oppositions and employs staff with ties to the Liberal Party of Australia, National Party of Australia and their state affiliates
- Location: Australia
- Official language: English
- Chairman: Grahame Morris
- CEO and Managing Director: Andrew Humpherson
- Managing Director (NSW): Anthony Benscher
- Managing Director (Federal): David Alexander
- Parent organization: WPP AUNZ Limited
- Affiliations: Liberal Party of Australia, National Party of Australia

Barton Deakin is an Australian and New Zealand government relations and lobbying firm. The firm is openly partisan and works primarily with Coalition governments and oppositions in Australia and the National Party in New Zealand. It employs staff with ties to the Liberal Party of Australia and National Party of Australia including their state affiliates, and the New Zealand National Party.

The firm has permanent offices in Canberra, Sydney, Melbourne, Brisbane, Perth and Wellington. It is touted as the largest firm in federal government lobbying in Australia after an increase in client and staff, particularly following the Coalition's 2013 Federal Election win. Barton Deakin is majority owned by WPP AUNZ Limited, the parent company of more than 80 communications firms in Australia, New Zealand and Southeast Asia. It sits within the WPP AUNZ Government Relations division.

The company's staff includes former politicians, political Chiefs of Staff, advisors and tacticians. Barton Deakin also produces briefs on Australian and New Zealand policy and government issues, which are distributed several times a week.

== Current staff ==
Andrew Humpherson is the CEO and Managing Director of the firm and is based in the NSW division. Humpherson was formerly a Chief of Staff to the Minister for Resources and Energy in the O'Farrell/Baird Government. Prior to this, he served in the NSW Parliament as the Member for Davidson for 15 years. He also served as a Shadow Minister for 8 years across the portfolios of planning, environment, justice and corrections, housing, water, community services and emergency services.

Grahame Morris is the Chairman and a Director in the firm's Federal division. Morris was formerly Chief of Staff to Prime Minister John Howard, and prior to that was an adviser to Liberal Leaders Andrew Peacock and Alexander Downer. Morris is a former journalist with The Australian and appears as a weekly panellist on Sky News Australia's PM Agenda program, on radio, on television shows such as the Australian Broadcasting Corporation's Q&A, and is often quoted in the print media.

Barton Deakin's Federal Managing Director is David Alexander. Alexander was formerly a senior adviser to Peter Costello as Treasurer and was part of the Tax Reform Implementation Unit, which oversaw the implementation of the GST. Alexander was also previously the economics editor of the Canberra Times and continues to provide media commentary, including on policy on SKY News Australia. He is a regular panelist on the Sky News Policy Panel.

Anthony Benscher is Managing Director of Barton Deakin's NSW division. Prior to joining the firm in the latter half of 2013, Benscher served as Chief of Staff to New South Wales Minister Pru Goward. Benscher also served as a senior adviser to John Howard from 1993 to 2000, and was a senior executive at Publishing and Broadcasting Limited (PBL).

John Griffin manages the firm's Victorian, South Australian and Tasmanian clients. Griffin was formerly Chief of Staff to Victorian Premier Jeff Kennett and Senior Private Secretary to John Hewson, working alongside Tony Abbott.

Cheryl Cartwright is a Director in the firm's Federal Division. Cartwright was the Chief of Staff to former Deputy Nationals Leader Warren Truss in his role as Minister for Agriculture. Cartwright was the Chief Executive of the Australian Pipelines and Gas Association for 12 years. Cartwright was a Canberra Press Gallery journalist working in print, radio and television.

Barton Deakin's website, shows that the company employs a number of other political figures and former Coalition staffers.

== Former staff ==
Barton Deakin's former Queensland Managing Director, Ted O'Brien, was elected as the Federal Member for Fairfax at the 2016 Federal Election. He had stood as the Liberal candidate at the 2013 election but was narrowly defeated by billionaire Clive Palmer.

Former Barton Deakin staff member, Lucy Wicks is also a member of the Parliament of Australia. Wicks won the New South Wales seat of Robertson in 2013 with a swing of 4 per cent. She was re-elected at the 2016 Federal Election.

The firm's previous chairman and founder is former New South Wales Treasurer and Liberal Leader, Peter Collins. Collins has been named as one of the most prominent Liberal Party identities working in the government relations industry in Australia.

The former CEO and Managing Director is Matthew Hingerty, former Chief of Staff to Minister George Souris in the O'Farrell Government. He was also Chief of Staff to Joe Hockey as Minister in the Howard government, an adviser to Peter Collins as Opposition Leader and to New South Wales Premier John Fahey and to several ministers throughout the Greiner-Fahey governments. Hingerty was also formerly the Managing Director of the Australian Tourism Export Council.

Former Brisbane Lord Mayor Sallyanne Atkinson established Barton Deakin's Queensland office in late 2011. She served as Chairman (Queensland) until early 2015. Atkinson was Lord Mayor during a period of extensive growth, including through World Expo 88, which is often credited as a "coming of age" event that transformed and repositioned Brisbane during the late 1980s.

== Controversy ==
=== "Cow" comment ===
Barton Deakin's Federal Director, Grahame Morris, landed himself in hot water in August 2012 for remarks he made on-air on 702 ABC Sydney in relation to a television interview of Tony Abbott by Leigh Sales the night earlier on 7.30. "Well, Leigh can be a real cow sometimes when she's doing interviews," Morris said.

The comment triggered public complaints for sexism, especially on Twitter. The situation was exacerbated when a British MP with the same name – Grahame Morris – mistakenly received emails and Tweets aimed at the Australian Grahame Morris. Leigh Sales responded to Morris' comment on Twitter, saying she would "rather be a cow than a dinosaur". Morris later apologised for the comment, stating that a more appropriate expression would have been something like, "Having known most of the senior journalists, and in particular the political journalists over the last 30 years, there are people who can be tough... [and] Leigh, at times, can be tough."

=== "Kicking her to death" comment ===
Grahame Morris was criticised for his remarks in the media again in early 2012 when, during a regular appearance on Sky News Australia's PM Agenda program, he said that Australians "ought to be kicking [Prime Minister Julia Gillard] to death." The comment was made in relation to Gillard's support of two MPs accused of improper and illegal conduct – Craig Thomson and Peter Slipper. Morris later apologised for the comment.

=== The Irish "can't grow potatoes" comment ===
Grahame Morris was criticised for his remarks in the media again in 2015 when, during a regular appearance on Sky News Australia's PM Agenda program, he said that the Irish "are people who can’t grow potatoes, who have a mutant lawn weed as their national symbol and they can’t verbalise the difference between tree and the number three".

=== Queensland Government and lobbyists ===
Barton Deakin's Queensland office was in the media in early 2013 in relation to a lunch they hosted in mid 2012 which the then Minister for Science, Information Technology, Innovation and the Arts, Ros Bates, attended as a guest. The minister was criticised in an article published in the Sunday Mail on 10 February for not declaring the lunch as a "contact with lobbyists", which the publication claimed contravened Queensland lobbying regulations. Soon after, Barton Deakin released a statement confirming that Bates had attended a lunch that they hosted, but stated that no lobbying had occurred at the event. After initially refusing to comment, Bates defended her decision not to declare the lunch, saying that she had received confirmation from the Integrity Commissioner that attending lunches did not constitute lobbying. She was backed by Premier Campbell Newman, who said he believed she had not broken the law and that he still had full confidence in her as minister.

Despite this, on 15 February 2013, Ros Bates resigned as minister citing poor health and the pressure her family had experienced as a result of a series of controversies and adverse media attention.
