= Tom Webster (politician) =

Australian politician

Member of the New South Wales Parliament for Wakehurst
- In office 7 October 1978 – 5 March 1984
- Preceded by: Allan Viney
- Succeeded by: John Booth

Deputy Mayor of Warringah
- In office 24 September 1996 – 23 September 1997
- Mayor: Sam Danieli
- Preceded by: Sam Danieli
- Succeeded by: Peter Moxham

Councillor on Warringah Council
- In office 14 September 1991 – 11 September 1999
- Preceded by: Mark Hummerston
- Succeeded by: Ruth Sutton
- Constituency: B Riding/A Ward

Personal details
- Party: Labor
- Spouse(s): Maja Gubler (m. 2 February 1980)
- Children: 1 Son; 1 Daughter
- Education: Sydney Technical College
- Occupation: Property valuer

Thomas Stephen Webster (born 5 July 1950) is a property valuer and former Labor Party local councillor and member of the New South Wales Legislative Assembly, representing the electorate of Wakehurst from 1978 to 1984.

== Early years ==
Born in 1950, Webster was educated at Rozelle Public School and Drummoyne Boys' High School (closed in 1990). After High school he attended Sydney Technical College and became a property valuer from 1970 for the Valuer-General's Department. As a Fellow of the Australian Property Institute (FAPI), Webster served as a divisional councillor from 2004 to 2009 and as president from 2006 to 2007.

== Political career ==
Webster joined the Grafton Branch of the Australian Labor Party in 1971 and joined the Dee Why branch in 1976, becoming president from 1977 to 1978. At age 28, he was pre-selected as Labor Party candidate for the NSW State seat of Wakehurst in 1978. The 1978 election saw a huge swing towards the Labor Party in NSW and was known as the 'Wranslide', in reference to the state leader, Neville Wran, with first-time seat wins in Wakehurst, Manly, Cronulla and Willoughby. Webster was elected on 7 October 1978, becoming the first Labor member of what was a traditionally safe Liberal seat, defeating the sitting Liberal member and Shadow Minister for Services, Allan Viney, on a swing of over 14 percent.

During his six years in Parliament, he served on a number of committees including the Public Accounts Committee. He was later appointed as senior policy adviser to the State Premier. He retained his seat at the 1981 election, gaining enough of a swing to technically make Wakehurst a safe Labor seat. However, he lost his seat to Liberal candidate John Booth at the 1984 election. With Booth only winning election on a margin of 1.6%, Wakehurst remained a marginal seat and Webster stood again as the Labor candidate at the 1988 election, but was again unsuccessful on a two-party-preferred result of 57-42% at an election that saw Labor lose power to the Coalition led by Nick Greiner.

Webster was later elected as a Councillor for B Riding (which became A Riding/Ward following the secession of Pittwater Council in 1992) on Warringah Shire Council in September 1991 and later served a single term as Deputy Mayor. He served on the council until 1999 After leaving he returned to work exclusively for his Valuer Practice, T. S. Webster and Associates, which he had founded in 1988, but remains involved in the Dee Why Branch of the ALP. In the lead-up to the 2011 NSW state election, Webster was made a life member of the ALP and tried to mentor local Labor candidates but lamented to the Manly Daily that: "In my 40-year membership of the party I don’t think we have ever been in such dire straits", a comment that was reflected in the subsequent landslide defeat suffered by the party at that election.

New South Wales Legislative Assembly
Preceded by Allan Viney	Member for Wakehurst; 1978–1984	Succeeded by John Booth
Civic offices
Preceded by Sam Danieli	Deputy Mayor of Warringah; 1996–1997	Succeeded by Peter Moxham
