= Kathryn Greiner =

Australian social worker

Alderman of the City of Sydney
- In office 1995–2004

Personal details
- Party: Independent Liberal
- Other political affiliations: Sydney Alliance (1999–2003)
- Spouse: Nick Greiner (m. 1970; sep. 2013)

Kathryn Therese Greiner AO (born 1946) is an Australian politician and social advocate. She is a former alderman of the City of Sydney from 1995 until 2004. She is separated from Nick Greiner, a former Premier of New South Wales.

== Career ==
Kathryn Therese Callaghan was born in 1946, the second daughter of Bede Callaghan (1912–1993) and Mollie née Brewer. Her father was a merchant banker, Chairman of the Commonwealth Bank and Chancellor of the University of Newcastle, and was knighted in 1976.

She attended schools in London and Washington, and Loreto Kirribilli in Sydney, where she was Head Prefect. She graduated from the University of New South Wales with a Bachelor of Social Work. She also holds a Certificate in Early Childhood Development from Macquarie University. Prior to 1988, she spent her entire working life in the child care area.

She married Nick Greiner, a businessman, in 1970. Following their marriage, the Greiners worked in the United States. She worked in the Institute of Human Resources at Boise State University, Idaho, specialising in childcare policy. On return to Australia she was a Program Officer in early childhood education for the NSW Department of Youth and Community Services 1976–1988.

In 1980 Nick Greiner was elected to the NSW Legislative Assembly for the Liberal Party, becoming Leader of the Opposition in 1983, and defeating the Labor Party's Barrie Unsworth in 1988 to become Premier of New South Wales. He was forced to resign as Premier in 1992.

Kathryn Greiner first contested the Sydney City Council election in 1995 as an independent aligned with the Liberal Party. She outpolled sitting Lord Mayor of Sydney Frank Sartor on the primary vote, but lost to him on preferences. In 1999 she led the Sydney Alliance team but again failed to become Lord Mayor. However, she served as an Alderman from 9 September 1995 to 6 February 2004. Sydney Alliance was voluntarily deregistered with the New South Wales Electoral Commission in 2003.

In 2003, she resigned as chair of the Sydney Peace Foundation and as a member of the executive council of the Research Institute for Asia and the Pacific, both associated with the University of Sydney. This was done in response to her husband's enforced resignation as chair of the university's Graduate School of Management in the wake of academic protests against his simultaneous chairmanship of British American Tobacco (Australia).

In September 2012, Kathryn Greiner was appointed Chair of the Ministerial Advisory Committee on Ageing by the NSW Minister for Ageing, Andrew Constance.

Her numerous other directorships and involvements have included: Financial Planning Association, John Singleton Advertising, Deputy Chancellor of Bond University, Australian Hearing, the National Capital Authority, Pacific Power, Carlovers Ltd, L.E.K. Consulting, Chair of Biotechcapital Ltd, member of the Schools Funding Review Panel (Gonski Review), Bell Shakespeare, Save the Children Australia, Asia Society Austral Asia Centre, Australian Ireland Fund, Salvation Army Executive Committee, and Musica Viva Australia National Advisory Council.

She has also been a media presenter for radio station 2UE and for television's Nine Network.

== Personal life ==
Kathryn Callaghan married Nick Greiner on 1 August 1970. They have two children, Justin and Kara, and six grandchildren. The Greiners separated in 1995, after he admitted having had an extra-marital affair. They reconciled in early 1996. They separated again in October 2013. She is a strong Catholic.

== Honours and awards ==
She was awarded the Centenary Medal in January 2001, and appointed an Officer of the Order of Australia in June 2001, "for service to social welfare, particularly in the area of family support and the development of strategies to prevent child abuse, to charity through raising awareness of the need for funding to permit expansion and delivery of services, and to local government in Sydney".
