= Bede Callaghan =

Australian banker and university administrator

Sir Bede Callaghan CBE
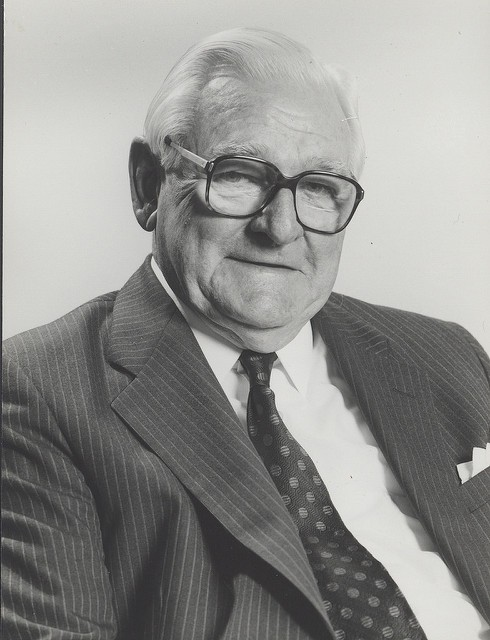
- Born: 16 March 1912; Wickham, New South Wales, Australia
- Died: 19 September 1993 (aged 81); Wahroonga, New South Wales, Australia
- Education: Newcastle High School
- Spouse: Mollie Brewer (m. 1940)
- Relatives: Kathryn Greiner (daughter)

Sir Bede Bertrand Callaghan CBE (16 March 1912 – 19 September 1993) was an Australian banker and university administrator. He was managing director of the Commonwealth Bank from 1965 to 1976 and chancellor of the University of Newcastle from 1977 to 1988.

== Early life ==
Callaghan was born in Wickham, New South Wales, to Amy Mabel (née Ryan) and Stanislaus Kostka Callaghan. He grew up in Newcastle and attended Newcastle High School until the age of 14, when he began working as an office boy in a mining company.

== Banking career ==
In 1927, aged 15, Callaghan began working at a Newcastle branch of the Commonwealth Bank. He moved to Cootamundra in 1934 and to Sydney in 1935, and thereafter progressed through the ranks of the company. In 1952, he moved to England to become assistant manager of the bank's London office. From 1954, he lived in Washington, D.C., as the bank's representative on the boards of the International Monetary Fund and International Bank for Reconstruction and Development. Callaghan returned to Australia in 1960 to become manager of the Commonwealth Development Bank. In May 1965, he succeeded Ernest Biggs Richardson as managing director of the Commonwealth Banking Corporation, a position he held until 1976. He was also president of the Bankers' Institute of Australasia from 1972 to 1974.

== University of Newcastle ==
In 1966, Callaghan was appointed to the inaugural council of the University of Newcastle, located in his home town. He was made deputy chancellor in 1973, and finally served as chancellor from 1977 to 1988. After his retirement the suburb of Callaghan, containing the university, was named in his honour.

== Honours ==
Callaghan was appointed a Commander of the Order of the British Empire (CBE) in 1968. He was knighted in 1976 for services to banking.

== Personal life ==
Callaghan married Mary (Mollie) Brewer in 1940. His three daughters include Kathryn Greiner.
