= 1992 Davidson state by-election =

- 2 May 1992

Electoral district of Davidson in the New South Wales Legislative Assembly
	First party	Second party
		IND
Candidate	Andrew Humpherson	Julie Sutton
Party	Liberal	Independent
Primary vote	15,852	9,489
Percentage	49.32%	29.52%
Swing	▼16.07	▲29.52
TCP	59.65%	40.35%
TCP swing	▼13.04	▲13.04
MP before election
Terry Metherell
Liberal
Elected MP
Andrew Humpherson
Liberal

A by-election was held for the New South Wales Legislative Assembly seat of Davidson on 2 May 1992.

It was triggered by the resignation of former Liberal Party-turned-independent MP, Terry Metherell, after the scandal known as the 'Metherell Crisis'.

The seat was subsequently won by Andrew Humpherson of the Liberal Party. However the Liberals suffered a 16% drop in their primary vote, and a 14% drop in their two party preferred vote.

== Background ==
The seat of Davidson, a traditionally safe Liberal seat, was held since 1981 by Terry Metherell, a controversial Minister for Education in the first term of the Greiner government.

Charges of tax avoidance forced his resignation from the Ministry in 1990. However, there was speculation that he would be re-appointed to the ministry when the Greiner government was re-elected in 1991. However, at the 1991 election, the Greiner government lost its majority, and was forced to depend on the support of the four independents in order to stay in office. This all but squashed any chance of Metherell returning to cabinet. Feeling betrayed and rejected from his party, Metherell resigned from the Liberal Party in October 1991 live on the 7:30 Report, without having given his colleagues notice.

The government subsequently created a job for Metherell, a position with the Environment Protection Agency. He accepted and duly resigned from state parliament, effectively engineering a vacancy in a seat that was very likely to revert to the Liberals in a by-election. Labor did not nominate a candidate, but a field of Independents and minor parties reduced the Liberal vote by 16%, and 14% after preferences.

== Results ==
1992 Davidson by-election Saturday 2 May
Party	Candidate	Votes	%	±%
Liberal	Andrew Humpherson	15,852	49.32	−16.07
Independent	Julie Sutton	9,489	29.52	+29.52
Greens	Ross Knowles	1,195	3.72	+3.72
Democrats	Edna Cunningham	1,156	3.60	−12.01
Independent	Kevin Begaud	918	2.86	+2.86
Independent	Michael Evanian	852	2.65	+2.65
Call to Australia	Bruce Coleman	770	2.40	+2.40
Independent EFF	Michael Vescio	683	2.12	+2.12
Independent	Ted Roach	361	1.12	+1.12
Independent	Janet Fairlie-Cuninghame	357	1.11	+1.11
Independent	Peter Leney	190	0.59	+0.59
Independent	Steven Klinger	157	0.49	+0.49
Independent	William Williams	105	0.33	+0.33
Independent	Julien Droulers	34	0.11	+0.11
Independent	Sandor Torzsok	24	0.07	+0.07
Total formal votes		32,143	96.97	
Informal votes		1,006	3.03	
Turnout		33,149	87.10	
Two-candidate-preferred result
Liberal	Andrew Humpherson	17,352	59.65	−13.04
Independent	Julie Sutton	11,737	40.35	+40.35
Liberal hold				

== See also ==
- Electoral results for the district of Davidson
- List of New South Wales state by-elections
