= Jordan Coulter =

Australian male model (born 1992)

- Born: Jordan Coulter; 17 December 1992 (age 32); Gold Coast, Queensland, Queensland
- Other names: Jordan, J.C.
- Modeling information
- Height: 1.87 m (6 ft 1 1/2 in)
- Hair color: Dark Blonde
- Eye color: Blue
- Agency: VNY Model Management

Jordan Coulter (born 17 December 1992) is an Australian male model from Gold Coast, Queensland.

== Career ==
Coulter was discovered when he was 15 years old by model scout Kirk Blake from What Models after leaving a Gold Coast cinema.

He has also been featured in Vogue Hommes International, GQ Australia, Dolce & Gabbana, Numero Homme, Vogue Homme Japan and American Eagle.

== Personal ==
His hobbies include surfing, snowboarding and rugby union.
