= Australian Pipeline Industry Association =

The Australian Pipelines and Gas Association (APGA) is an Australian industry association representing Australia's high-pressure transmission pipeline sector, with a principal focus on long-distance oil and gas transmission, but also including transportation of other products such as water, slurry and carbon dioxide.

== History ==
In 1968 APIA began as a construction contractors’ association, providing networking opportunities for the pipeline construction industry. The association expanded its interests over the years and, with the privatisation of Australia's transmission assets and the winding back of the Australian Gas Association in the late 1990s, APGA increased its government relations role, establishing its headquarters in the nation's capital, Canberra, in 1999.

The association was formerly known as the Australian Pipeline Industry Association (APIA) and changed the name to APGA in March 2015.

== Membership ==
The association has over 400 member companies, covering a range of interests relevant to the transmission pipeline sector including contractors, owners, operators, advisers, engineering companies and suppliers of pipeline products and services.

APGA members build, own and operate over 33,000 kilometres of high pressure, steel pipeline in Australia, including 25,000 km of pipeline dedicated to gas transmission.

== Owner Members ==
The "Owner Members" of APGA consist of all the gas transmission pipeline companies of Australia, which are:

1. APA

2. AGIG

3. Epic Energy

4. Jemena

5. SEA Gas

6. Tasmanian Gas Pipeline (TGP)

== Lead Members ==
The "Lead Members" of APGA are active in the association's activities and consist of:

1. AGL

2. Esso

3. McConnell Dowell

4. MPC Kinetic

5. Nacap

6. OSD Pipelines

7. QGC

8. Shell Australia

9. Solar Turbines

10. Spie Capag

11. Worley

== Corporate Members ==
The corporate members represent all aspects of the pipeline industry.
