= Terry Metherell =

Australian politician (born 1947)

The Honourable Dr. Terry Metherell PhD

Minister for Education and Youth Affairs
- In office 25 March 1988 – 20 July 1990
- Premier: Nick Greiner
- Preceded by: Rodney Cavalier
- Succeeded by: Virginia Chadwick

Member of the New South Wales Parliament for Davidson
- In office 19 September 1981 – 10 April 1992
- Preceded by: Dick Healey
- Succeeded by: Andrew Humpherson

Personal details
- Born: 9 January 1947 (age 79) London, United Kingdom
- Party: Independent (from 1991)
- Other political affiliations: Liberal Party (until 1991)
- Occupation: Tutor and lecturer

Terry Alan Metherell (born 9 January 1947) is an Australian former politician who represented the Electoral district of Davidson in the New South Wales Legislative Assembly from 1981 to 1992. When the Liberal Party won the 1988 election, Premier Nick Greiner appointed him Minister for Education and Youth Affairs, a portfolio he held until 1990. In October 1991, he resigned from the Liberal party and remained in Parliament until his resignation to take up an offer of a public service job. This offer led to the downfall of Greiner, who was found to have corruptly offered the position to force a by-election in Metherell’s district.

== Early life ==
Metherell was born in England in 1947 and migrated to Australia when he was eight years old. He was educated at Caringbah High School and the University of Sydney, where he first graduated with a Bachelor of Arts (Honours) and a Diploma of Education (DipEd). Metherell then gained a Doctor of Philosophy (PhD), majoring in Australian Political History. Between 1973 and 1975 he was a tutor and part-time lecturer in Town Planning and Government at the University of Sydney.

== Early political career ==
Joining the Liberal Party in 1975, Metherell joined the Burwood Branch and was appointed research assistant and later private secretary to the Member for Wentworth and Attorney General of Australia, Robert Ellicott QC from 1975 until 1977. Metherell was then made private secretary to the Minister for Education, Senator John Carrick, and then from 1979 to 1981 in his role as Minister for National Development and Energy. Metherell was also a member of the State Executive of the New South Wales Division of the Liberal Party from 1979 to 1981.

In November 1980 Metherell was pre-selected as the Liberal candidate for the safe northern Sydney seat of Davidson and was elected to the Legislative Assembly of New South Wales at the 1981 election. Upon his election, Metherell was immediately promoted to the front bench, becoming Shadow Minister for Transport and Roads under opposition leader John Dowd. He held this post from 29 October 1981 to 15 May 1986, when he was appointed as the Shadow Minister for Education and Youth Affairs under the new leader, Nick Greiner.

== In Government ==
At the 1988 election a Liberal Government was elected under Greiner and Metherell was appointed Minister for Education and Youth Affairs. As minister, Metherell undertook a programme of reform of the education system in New South Wales.

This resulted in the Education Reform Act 1990 (NSW) (now the Education Act 1990). Prior to its assent on 1 June 1990, school education in New South Wales had been provided under a law developed 110 years earlier by Henry Parkes and William Wilkins in their "Public Instruction Act 1880 (NSW)". On the significance of this law, Metherell said in early 1990: "Chifley in his time was thought of as somewhat of an ogre, but now when we look back on Ben Chifley we reflect upon his statesmanship. People will eventually thank me for these reforms - this is a blueprint for education into the 21st century".

Aspects of the Act were initially unpopular. Charges of tax avoidance forced his resignation from the Ministry in 1990. However there was speculation that he would be re-appointed to the ministry when the Greiner government was re-elected in 1991. Between 6 June 1991 and 2 October 1991 Metherell was appointed as the Parliamentary Secretary to the Premier, with special responsibility for urban affairs, and was named as a Member of the University of Sydney Senate (1991–1992).

== The "Metherell Affair" and resignation ==
At the 1991 election, the Coalition lost 10 seats to Labor, leaving it one seat short of a majority. The Coalition was able to form a minority government with the support of the four independents in the legislature. Under the circumstances, any chances of Metherell returning to Cabinet were quashed. Feeling betrayed and rejected from his party, on 2 October 1991 Metherell resigned from the Liberal Party live on the ABC's 7.30 Report, without having given his colleagues notice: "Special leadership qualities are required in a time of great economic and social stress. Barton, Deakin, Curtin and Menzies had such qualities. This government has lost its way. The Premier seems unable to reach out and take the community into his confidence. He offers no clear vision that will lift the people in this time of deep recession".

When the government lost The Entrance by-election to Labor candidate Grant McBride, negotiations with Metherell began. Metherell had expressed his interest in one of the Directorships at the new Environmental Protection Authority to neighbouring Liberal member for Wakehurst, Brad Hazzard. Hazzard then discussed this with Premier Greiner and Minister for the Environment, Tim Moore, at Greiner's residence in February 1992. Greiner and Hazzard then discussed the matter with Metherell while in Parliament ten days later. From the time of these meetings until Metherell's resignation, Metherell reconciled with his former party, supporting the government in parliament, changing his vote to support the "Timber Industry (Interim Protection) Bill" and supported Greiner's "Vision" statement, which had drawn criticism from the Parliament.

Metherell introduced in February 1992 the "Wilderness (Declaration of New Areas) Bill 1992", which sought to declare new sections of land for protection as wilderness under existing legislation. The bill was a crucial factor in triggering the decision by the Minister for Environment, Iim Moore, to announce in April 1992 a public exhibition and submission process for a National Parks and Wildlife Service assessment report for twenty three nominated wilderness areas. Despite the Bill being shelved following Metherell's resignation from Parliament, the wilderness assessment reports were eventually published, allowing for extensive protection of bushland areas.

The government subsequently created a job for Metherell, a position with the Environment Protection Agency. Metherell accepted the offer and resigned from Parliament, effectively engineering a vacancy in a seat that was very likely to revert to the Liberals at a by-election. At the May 1992 by-election the Labor Party did not nominate a candidate, but a field of Independents and minor parties reduced the Liberal vote by 16%, and 14% after preferences, nevertheless won by Liberal candidate Andrew Humpherson.

However, the Liberals' retaking of Davidson proved to be a Pyrrhic victory for the Coalition. Because the Coalition only had a minority, it could not prevent the Legislative Assembly referring the matter of Metherell's appointment to the Independent Commission Against Corruption, which made findings of corruption. The four independents threatened to support a Labor no-confidence motion if Greiner stayed in office, forcing Greiner and the Minister for the Environment, Tim Moore, to resign. These findings were eventually ruled by the Supreme Court of New South Wales as being outside the powers of the ICAC to make. Metherell never took up the offered job.

== Post political career ==
Following his departure from politics, Metherell became a Director of Life Education Australia, which provides drug education programs to students throughout Australia, a position he held until 1999. He now dedicates his time to the Manly–Warringah Historical Society and various other local associations.

New South Wales Legislative Assembly
Preceded by Dick Healey	Member for Davidson; 1981–1992	Succeeded by Andrew Humpherson
Political offices
Preceded by Rodney Cavalier as Minister for Education	Minister for Education and Youth Affairs; 1988–1990	Succeeded by Virginia Chadwick
Preceded by John Aquilina as Minister for Youth and Community Services	Minister for Education and Youth Affairs; 1988–1990	Succeeded by Virginia Chadwick
