= Jonathan O'Dea =

Australian politician (born 1966)

The Honourable Jonathan O'Dea
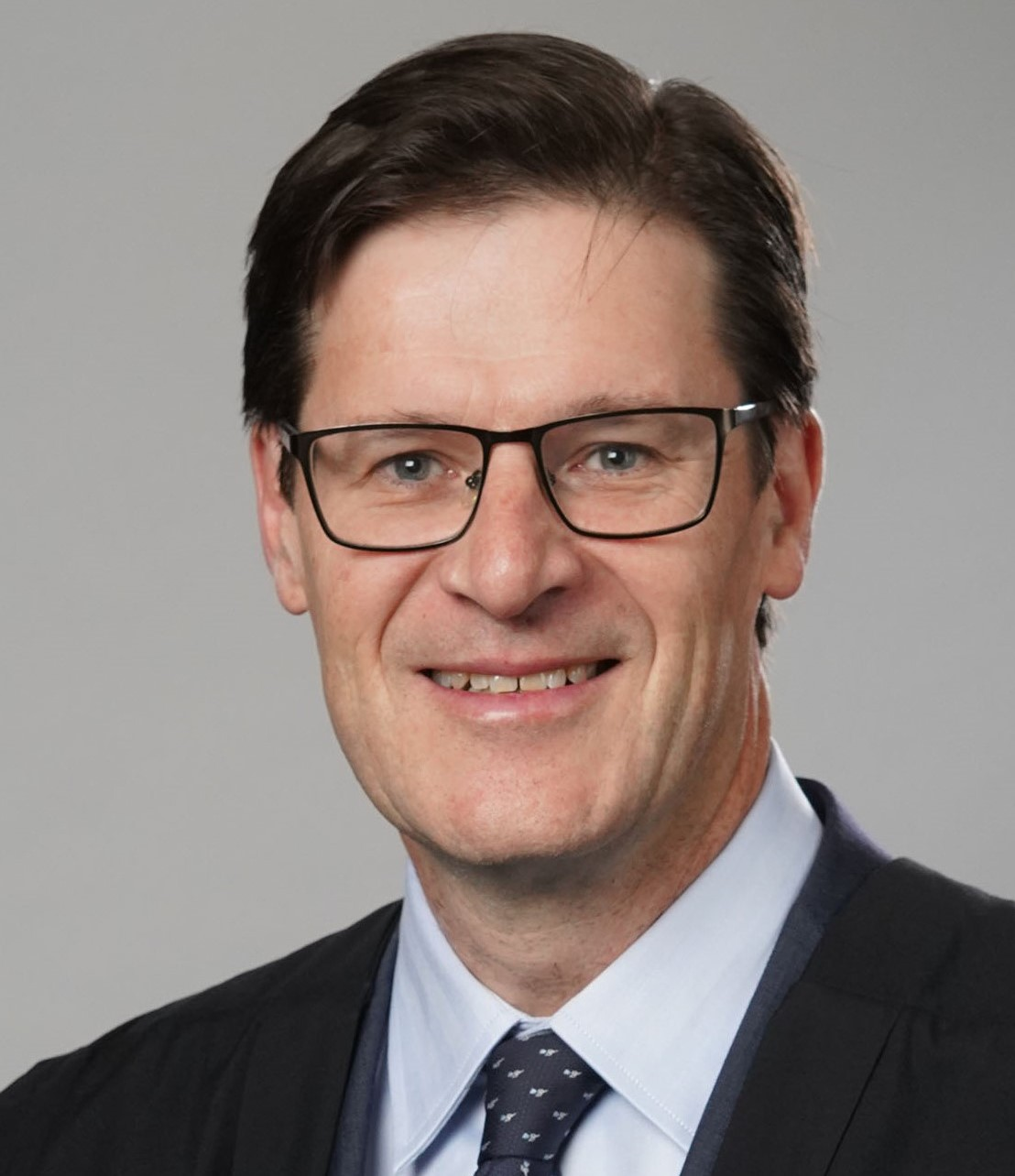

31st Speaker of the New South Wales Legislative Assembly
- In office 7 May 2019 – 9 May 2023
- Deputy: Leslie Williams
- Preceded by: Shelley Hancock
- Succeeded by: Greg Piper

Member of the New South Wales Parliament for Davidson
- In office 24 March 2007 – 25 March 2023
- Preceded by: Andrew Humpherson
- Succeeded by: Matt Cross

Councillor of North Sydney Council for Belmore Ward
- In office 1 July 1993 – 9 September 1995

Alderman of the Municipality of North Sydney for Belmore Ward
- In office 14 September 1991 – 30 June 1993

Personal details
- Born: 9 March 1966 (age 60) Sydney
- Party: Liberal Party
- Parent: Michael O'Dea
- Education: University of Sydney
- Occupation: Financial manager

Jonathan Richard O'Dea (born 9 March 1966) is a former Australian politician and a member of the New South Wales Legislative Assembly representing Davidson for the Liberal Party from 2007 until 2023. He served as Speaker of the Legislative Assembly from 2019 to 2023.

== Early life ==
O'Dea was born in Sydney in 1966 to Michael O'Dea and Marianne O'Dea, one of nine brothers and sisters. His father served several terms as mayor of North Sydney Council and was awarded the Member of the Order of Australia in 1994.

He was educated on the North Shore of Sydney at St Aloysius College and St Ignatius' College, Riverview, and attended the University of Sydney where he gained a Bachelor of Arts, a Bachelor of Laws and a Master of Laws. He has also undertaken further studies and was awarded a Graduate Diploma in Legal Studies and a Master of Business Administration. He is a Fellow of the Australian Institute of Company Directors. While at university, O'Dea was the Vice-President of the University of Sydney Students' Representative Council between 1986 and 1987.

Admitted as a solicitor, O'Dea practiced for five years before moving into commercial and senior management roles. He joined the Liberal Party in 1994, serving in numerous capacities, and was elected as a Councillor on North Sydney Council from 1991 until 1995.

In addition to his regular work, from 1995 to 2009 he was a non-executive board director with the private health insurer HCF. From 2000 to 2004, O'Dea also served part-time as Deputy Convenor for the Australian Classification Review Board.

== Political career ==
In 2005, O'Dea was the general manager of the Crown Insurance Group and a director with HCF and was named as a potential candidate for the seat of Pittwater, following the resignation of the sitting member and Opposition leader, John Brogden. However, O'Dea did not stand.

In a Liberal Party preselection battle before the 2007 state election, O'Dea defeated the sitting member for Davidson, Andrew Humpherson. Humpherson had cross-factional backing among many delegates, but had lost support in local branches after reportedly instructing party members to quit branches supportive of O'Dea, thereby reducing their voting power. Despite Humpherson having the support of the Party Leader, Peter Debnam, O'Dea won the vote 54 votes to 52 and Humpherson chose to not re-contest the election. In March 2007, O'Dea was elected to Parliament with a majority of 24.7 points. In June 2007, he was appointed a member of the Committee on the Independent Commission Against Corruption (ICAC). From 2008, in Opposition, O'Dea served as the chair of the NSW Coalition WasteWatch Committee. In 2011 he was elected Chair of the crucial cross-party Public Accounts Committee of the NSW Parliament.

In September 2009, O'Dea was accused in a local newspaper, the Manly Daily, of failing to adequately represent his constituents, by Ku-ring-gai Councillor Tony Hall, who urged O'Dea to "get off his backside" and lobby New South Wales Planning Minister Kristina Keneally to protect the area from excessive development. O'Dea responded, defending his record: "Along with (Opposition Leader and MP for Ku-ring-gai) Barry O'Farrell I have fought long and hard against inappropriate planning and over development...in the past 12 months I have taken part in 30 formal meetings with authorities and community representatives regarding Ku-ring-gai planning matters, three involved the planning minister and community representatives".

On 18 October 2010, the Liberal Party announced that O'Dea had been endorsed as the party's candidate for Davidson ahead of the 2011 state election. O'Dea was elected with a swing of 13.8 per cent and won the seat with 86.5 per cent of the vote on a two-party preferred basis. His main competitor was Labor's Mathew Gilliland. In 2015, O'Dea was re-elected with 78.8 per cent of the vote on a two party preferred basis, a swing 4.1 per cent against him, defeating the Green's David Sentinella. In 2019, O'Dea was again re-elected with 75.2 per cent of the vote on a two party preferred basis, a swing 3.7 per cent against him, defeating the Green's Felicity Davis.

On 28 March 2015, O'Dea was appointed as Parliamentary Secretary for Tourism and Major Events. In April 2016, Premier Baird conferred the additional title of Parliamentary Secretary for Trade and Investment. After the change in Premier to Gladys Berejiklian, he was appointed Parliamentary Secretary to the Premier and Treasurer. At the 2019 state election, O'Dea suffered a small swing against him, but was still re-elected with a majority of 75.2 percent against the Greens, making Davidson the safest Liberal seat in Sydney. Following the election, Premier Berejiklian nominated Mr O'Dea as the 40th Speaker of the Legislative Assembly, succeeding Shelley Hancock. The NSW Parliament Legislative Assembly subsequently elected Mr O'Dea as Speaker on 7 May 2019. In line with established parliamentary tradition, Mr O'Dea was ceremonially ‘dragged’ to the Speaker's chair by Premier Berejiklian and Planning Minister, Rob Stokes.

He stood down at the 2023 New South Wales state election, and was succeeded by Liberal candidate Matt Cross.

== Honours ==
- On 9 June 2023, O'Dea was granted retention of The Honourable title by the Governor for life, for having served as speaker for more than three years.
- Order of the Rising Sun, Gold Rays with Rosette (2023) for contributions to "promoting interregional exchanges and mutual understanding between Japan and Australia".

New South Wales Legislative Assembly
Preceded by Andrew Humpherson	Member for Davidson; 2007–2023	Succeeded by Matt Cross
Preceded by Shelley Hancock	Speaker of the Legislative Assembly; 2019–2023	Succeeded by Greg Piper
