= Allan Viney =

Australian politician

Allan Viney OAM

Member of the New South Wales Parliament for Wakehurst
- In office 13 February 1971 – 12 September 1978
- Preceded by: Dick Healey
- Succeeded by: Tom Webster

Personal details
- Born: 29 July 1919 Sydney, New South Wales
- Died: 13 June 2008 (aged 88) Sydney, Australia
- Party: Liberal Party
- Spouse: Joan Shirley Viney
- Occupation: Advertising Executive

Arthur Edward Allanby "Allan" Viney OAM (29 July 1919 – 13 June 2008) was an Australian politician and Liberal Party member of the New South Wales Legislative Assembly. Viney represented the electorate of Wakehurst (1971–1978).

Born in Sydney, Viney was educated at Mortlake Primary School and Fort Street Boys High School. From 1938 to 1940 he served with the Australian military forces. In 1940 and 1941 he served with the Second Australian Imperial Force. Between 1941 and 1943, he served in the Anti-tank Artillery Regiment.

Allan joined the Liberal Party and was a member of the New South Wales Legislative Assembly from 13 February 1971 to 12 September 1978. In addition to serving as parliamentary backbencher Viney served as the Shadow Minister for Transport from 1976 to 1978 and was the Shadow Minister for Corrective Services in 1978 under the leadership of Sir Eric Willis (1976–1977) and Peter Coleman (1977–1978) until his retirement from politics.

Viney belonged to many community organisations on the Northern Beaches including the Rural Fire Service for 35 years, for which he was awarded the National Medal in 1988 with Two clasps. As a member of parliament he received the Queen Elizabeth II Silver Jubilee Medal on 1 August 1977. On 26 January 2007 he was awarded the Medal of the Order of Australia for "Service through rural fire and service organisations and to the New South Wales Parliament".

On 13 June 2008 Allan Viney died at Mona Vale Hospital.

New South Wales Legislative Assembly
Preceded by Dick Healey	Member for Wakehurst; 1971–1978	Succeeded by Tom Webster
