= Andrew Humpherson =

Australian politician

Member of the New South Wales Parliament for Davidson
- In office 7 May 1992 – 2 March 2007
- Preceded by: Terry Metherell
- Succeeded by: Jonathan O'Dea

Deputy Shire President of Warringah
- In office 24 September 1991 – 30 May 1992
- President: Brian Green
- Preceded by: Frank Beckman
- Succeeded by: Julie Sutton

Councillor of Warringah Shire Council
- In office 17 March 1987 – 30 May 1992
- Succeeded by: Bob Page
- Constituency: D Riding/C Ward

Personal details
- Born: 15 August 1960 (age 66) London, United Kingdom
- Party: Liberal Party
- Education: University of New South Wales
- Occupation: Engineer and politician

Andrew Humpherson (born 15 August 1960) is a former Australian politician, elected as a member of the New South Wales Legislative Assembly for Davidson from 1992 to 2007. He has since pursued a career in public affairs overseeing the Government and Public Affairs Division of Australian Nuclear Science and Technology Organisation and as Chief of Staff to the Energy and Resources Minister, Chris Hartcher from 2011 to 2014. He is currently a Director of Barton Deakin, a Liberal-aligned lobbying firm founded by his former parliamentary colleague, Peter Collins.

== Early life ==
Humpherson was born in the United Kingdom in 1960. His family moved to Australia in 1970 and he was educated at Davidson High School where he became a member of the Student Representative Council and the Warringah Youth Council. He attended the University of New South Wales where he graduated with honours in the degree of Bachelor of Engineering (Chemical).

Between 1986 and 1992 he was employed as an engineer and also a Territory Manager for Shell Australia. Humpherson entered politics on 14 March 1987 as an independent Councillor on Warringah Shire Council and was Deputy Shire President from 1991–1992 until he resigned on 30 May 1992, following his election to state parliament.

== Political career ==
He was elected into the New South Wales Legislative Assembly for the seat of Davidson, at a May 1992 by-election brought on by the resignation of former Education Minister and Liberal-turned-independent member Terry Metherell, who resigned to take up a public service appointment offered by the Greiner government. The Independent Commission Against Corruption undertook an investigation into the appointment amid allegations that this amounted to a corrupt attempt to have Davidson return to the Liberal Party, which had lost its parliamentary majority at the 1991 election. The independents who held the balance of power subsequently forced Greiner's resignation as Premier, but ICAC was found to have exceeded its jurisdiction by the Supreme Court of New South Wales. However Davidson returned to the Liberals, with Humpherson easily winning the by-election ahead of 14 other candidates, despite a 16.1 per cent swing against the Liberal Party.

As a backbencher, Humpherson served in various Parliamentary committees, until in 2000 when he was appointed as a Shadow Minister under Opposition Leader Kerry Chikarovski. He held various shadow portfolios including Housing and Corrective Services (2000–2002), Planning and Environment (2002–2003), Justice (2003–2006), Community Services (2005–2006) and Emergency Services (2003–2007).

Humpherson was narrowly defeated in a preselection battle before the 2007 election in favour of insurance executive, Jonathan O'Dea. Humpherson had cross-factional backing among many delegates, but attracted controversy in local branches after reportedly suggesting party members to quit branches under O'Dea's control, thereby reducing their voting power, a practice known as 'branch stripping'. Despite having support of the Party Leader, Peter Debnam, Humpherson lost the vote 52 votes to 54 and he retired from parliament.

== Later career ==
In March 2007, Humpherson was appointed to the newly created position of general manager of Government and Public Affairs at the Australian Nuclear Science and Technology Organisation (ANSTO) and was a member of the management committee. Humpherson left ANSTO in late 2010 to establish his own government relations consultancy, Waratah Advisory, in anticipation of an expected Liberal win at the March 2011 NSW election and accepted a position as Chief of Staff to the newly appointed Resources and Energy Minister, Chris Hartcher.

In May 2012, Humpherson was accused by members of the state parliamentary opposition for continuing to be listed as the main contact for Waratah Advisory, with calls for his resignation. He nevertheless continued in this role until the resignation of Hartcher following a raid by corruption authorities in December 2013. Humpherson gained further attention when he took up a consulting role with the NSW Minerals Council two months after Hartcher's resignation, an action against a 2010 recommendation of the Independent Commission Against Corruption (ICAC) that former staff of ministers and parliamentary secretaries be banned for a year from lobbying activity "relating to any matter that they had official dealings within their last 12 months in office".

Since 2015 he has been a Director of Barton Deakin, a Liberal-aligned lobbying firm founded by his former parliamentary colleague, Peter Collins.

== Notes ==
Civic offices
| Preceded by Frank Beckman | Deputy Shire President of Warringah; 1991–1992 | Succeeded by Julie Sutton |
New South Wales Legislative Assembly
| Preceded by Terry Metherell | Member for Davidson; 1992–2007 | Succeeded by Jonathan O'Dea |
