= Matt Cross (politician) =

Australian politician

Matt Cross MP

Member of the New South Wales Assembly for Davidson
- Incumbent
- Assumed office 25 March 2023
- Preceded by: Jonathan O'Dea

Personal details
- Party: Liberal
- Spouse: Gessika
- Education: University of Sydney; Harvard University

Matthew Thomas Cross is an Australian politician. He was elected a member of the New South Wales Legislative Assembly representing Davidson for the Liberal Party in 2023.

He currently serves as the Shadow Cabinet Secretary, Shadow Parliamentary Secretary for Men's Health, and Parliamentary Secretary for Government Accountability in the Sloane shadow ministry.

== Education ==
Cross attended St Leo's Catholic College in Wahroonga.

He graduated with a Bachelor of Arts (Honours) and a Master of United States Studies at the University of Sydney.

Cross later graduated with a Master of Public Administration from John F. Kennedy School of Government at Harvard University

== Career ==
Cross commenced his career working in the local offices of Philip Ruddock and Gladys Berejiklian whilst undertaking undergraduate studies.

He also undertook an internship at the National Republican Congressional Committee in Washington DC and was a policy and research officer at the European Australian Business Council.

Upon graduating from university, Cross served as an adviser to NSW Premiers Barry O'Farrell and Mike Baird.

In 2015, Cross moved to the corporate and not-for-profit sectors working for KPMG, the Property Council of Australia, and The George Institute for Global Health.

== Political career ==
Upon his election, Cross was appointed as a member of the Joint Standing Committee on Road Safety. He also served as Shadow Assistant Minister for Transport and Roads, Shadow Assistant Minister for Infrastructure, and Shadow Assistant Minister for Education.

In his inaugural speech to the NSW Parliament in May 2023, Cross spoke about his Liberal values and his long-term interest in home ownership and preventative health. He also spoke of the "politics and leadership of inclusion".

In May 2024, Cross shared he had been diagnosed with bowel cancer and was undergoing treatment. It was found when he was donating blood to the Australian Red Cross Lifeblood.
