= Dick Healey =

New South Wales politician

The Honourable Dick Healey

Member of the New South Wales Parliament for Davidson
- In office 13 February 1971 – 28 August 1981
- Preceded by: New district
- Succeeded by: Terry Metherell

Personal details
- Born: 7 December 1923 Broken Hill, New South Wales
- Died: 10 December 2000 (aged 77) Sydney
- Party: Liberal Party
- Spouse(s): Winifred Mary (1945–63); Doreen Robins (1963–2000)
- Occupation: Broadcaster, Politician

Military service
- Branch/service: Royal Australian Air Force
- Years of service: 1942–1946
- Rank: Warrant Officer
- Unit: No. 458 Squadron RAAF
- Battles/wars: World War II; Mediterranean and Middle East Theatre

Richard Owen Healey (7 December 1923 – 10 December 2000) was a New South Wales politician, ABC sports broadcaster, and minister of the crown in the cabinets of Sir Robert Askin, Tom Lewis and Sir Eric Willis. From 1973 to 1975 he was Minister for Youth and Community Services, when he was made Minister for Health, which he held until the Coalition lost office in May 1976. He was a member of the New South Wales Legislative Assembly for 19 years from 3 March 1962 until his retirement on 28 August 1981 for the Liberal Party.

== Early life ==
Healey was born on 7 December 1923 in Broken Hill, New South Wales, the son of Alban Richard Healey and his wife Lurline McCloskey, and was educated at Parramatta High School. On 20 June 1942, at age 18, he enlisted in the Royal Australian Air Force (RAAF) as a Warrant officer in Canada and saw service in England and the Middle East with No. 458 Squadron RAAF during World War II. He married Winifred Mary on 2 October 1945 in Brighton, England, having a daughter and two sons. On his return to Australia, he was demobilised on 17 January 1946 and worked first as a radio announcer and then as a sports editor at Australian Broadcasting Corporation radio from 1951 to 1962. He was appointed as sports editor on ABC TV in 1956 until he entered parliament in 1962.

== Political career ==
Healey was encouraged to enter into State politics by the then Liberal Leader Robert Askin and he was preselected to contest the seat of Wakehurst, a new seat with a notional Liberal majority, at the 1962 election. He was duly elected with 51.7% of the vote and went on to hold it a further two times in 1965 and 1968. After divorcing his first wife, Healey married Doreen Robins on 8 August 1963. He soon became a member of the Coalition Government, Liberal Party under Sir Robert Askin and the Country Party under Sir Charles Cutler, which swept into Government in 1965 after almost 25 years of Labor government.

Healey became heavily involved within many areas of community service, including as Chairman of the Davidson Park Trust, in which capacity he was instrument in the establishment of Garigal National Park, the vice-president of the Royal Life Saving Society, vice-president of the Manly-Warringah Scouting Association, vice-president of the New South Wales Division of the Air Force Association, chairman of the Wentworth Park Trust, the founder of the New South Wales Water Safety Council, and as state president of the New South Wales Little Athletics Association. He was a member of New South Wales Fitness Council from 1967 to 1976 and president of the Diabetics Association of New South Wales. Healey was also made a Fellow of the Australian Institute of Management (FAIM).

He resigned his seat of Wakehurst on 13 January 1971 in order to contest the new and closer seat of Davidson. He was then elected as member for Davidson at the 1971 election with 80.2% of the vote against a single DLP candidate. He attended the official opening of The Forest High School as Member for Wakehurst on 24 October 1964, and later the official opening of Davidson High School as Member for Davidson in 1974.

On 3 December 1973, Healey was appointed a Minister of the Crown as Minister for Youth and Community Services until 3 January 1975. In 1975 he took over one of the most difficult portfolios, Minister for Health, a position he held until the defeat of the Sir Eric Willis Government in 1976. He stayed on in Opposition and served as Shadow Minister for Health from 28 May 1976 to 7 October 1978 under Willis and Peter Coleman and then as Shadow Minister for Police and Services under leader John Mason. He held his seat of Davidson for a further three times in 1973, 1976 and 1978 until he retired after losing a pre-selection contest to Terry Metherell on 28 August 1981.

== Later life ==
He was an active member for the RSL and served the Forestville branch up until his death. As a member of parliament he received the Queen Elizabeth II Silver Jubilee Medal on 1 August 1977. On 5 December 2000, he was awarded the Australian Sports Medal for "Service as President of the Little Athletics Association of NSW for 30 years". He continued to serve the community until his death three days after his 77th birthday on 10 December 2000. He was survived by his wife and his three children.

New South Wales Legislative Assembly
New district	Member for Wakehurst; 1962–1971	Succeeded by Allan Viney
New district	Member for Davidson; 1971–1981	Succeeded by Terry Metherell
Political offices
Preceded by John Waddy	Minister for Youth and Community Services; 1973–1975	Succeeded by Rex Jackson
Preceded by John Waddy	Minister for Health; 1975–1976	Succeeded by Kevin Stewart
