= Norgate Data =

Norgate Data, based in Australia, was founded in 1992. Norgate provides end-of-day price data for stock markets in Australia, Canada and USA, worldwide futures price data, cash commodifty and foreign currency data. Such data can be charted through Technical Analysis charting packages such as MetaStock and AmiBroker, and accessed in programming languages such as Python.

Norgate's data services are utilised by retail-level non-professional traders and investors, Government entities such as the Brazil Government, large corporate entities such as Deutsche Börse, analysts and University researchers.

== Corporate site ==
norgatedata.com
