= Electoral district of Davidson =

State electoral district of New South Wales, Australia

Davidson New South Wales—Legislative Assembly
- Interactive map of district boundaries from the 2023 state election
- State: New South Wales
- Created: 1971
- MP: Matt Cross
- Party: Liberal
- Namesake: Sir Walter Davidson
- Electors: 59,865 (2023)
- Area: 74.71 km^{2} (28.8 sq mi)
- Demographic: Urban
Electorates around Davidson:
Hornsby	Pittwater	Pittwater
Wahroonga	Davidson	Wakehurst
Lane Cove	Willoughby	Wakehurst

Davidson is an electoral district of the Legislative Assembly in the Australian state of New South Wales. It is represented by Matt Cross of the Liberal Party.

Covering parts of Sydney's Northern Beaches and North Shore regions, it spills across portions of the Northern Beaches Council and Ku-ring-gai Council LGAs.

Davidson includes portions of two of the most Liberal-supporting areas of Sydney, and has been in the hands of the Liberal Party for its entire existence. While Labor frequently runs dead in northern Sydney, Davidson is especially hostile territory for Labor. The only times that Labor has even remotely threatened the Liberals' hold on the seat came during the two "Wranslides" in 1978 and 1981, which were the only times that the Liberals have failed to win at least 60 percent of the two-party-preferred vote. However, even on those occasions, the Liberals won enough primary votes to retain the seat outright. Since the 1990s, Labor has been lucky to get 30 percent of the two-party-preferred vote, and has even been pushed into third place on some occasions.

== Members for Davidson ==
Member	Party	Period
Dick Healey	Liberal	1971–1981
Terry Metherell	Liberal	1981–1991
Terry Metherell	Independent	1991–1992
Andrew Humpherson	Liberal	1992–2007
Jonathan O'Dea	Liberal	2007–2023
Matt Cross	Liberal	2023–present

== Geography ==
On its current boundaries, Davidson includes all of the namesake suburb of Davidson, as well as North Turramurra, St Ives, St Ives Chase, Killara, East Killara, Lindfield, East Lindfield, Roseville and Roseville Chase. It also includes parts of Turramurra, Belrose, Frenchs Forest, and Pymble.

== Election results ==
2023 New South Wales state election: Davidson
Party	Candidate	Votes	%	±%
Liberal	Matt Cross	28,865	54.1	−10.3
Labor	Karyn Edelstein	10,917	20.5	+6.3
Independent	Janine Kitson	6,080	11.4	+11.4
Greens	Caroline Atkinson	6,060	11.4	−2.1
Sustainable Australia	Andrew Wills	1,397	2.6	−1.1
Total formal votes		53,319	97.8	−0.1
Informal votes		1,196	2.2	+0.1
Turnout		54,515	91.1	0.0
Two-party-preferred result
Liberal	Matt Cross	30,821	63.9	−10.9
Labor	Karyn Edelstein	17,393	36.1	+10.9
Liberal hold		Swing	−10.9	
