= Nick Greiner =

Australian politician (born 1947)

The Honourable Nick Greiner AC
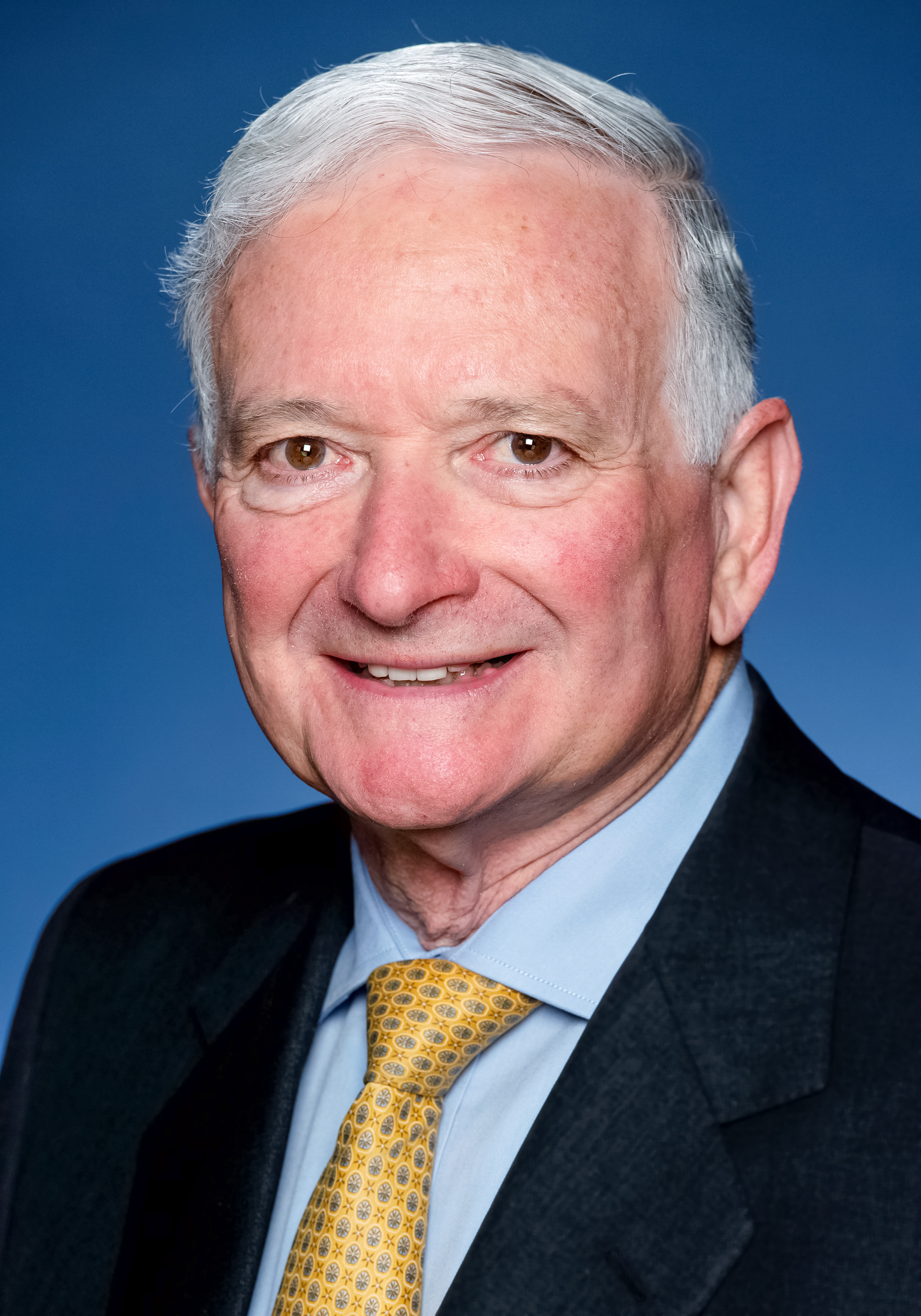
- Greiner in 2021

37th Premier of New South Wales
- In office 25 March 1988 – 24 June 1992
- Monarch: Elizabeth II
- Governor: Sir James Rowland; Sir David Martin; Peter Sinclair
- Deputy: Wal Murray
- Preceded by: Barrie Unsworth
- Succeeded by: John Fahey

President of the Liberal Party of Australia
- In office 24 June 2017 – 7 August 2020
- Deputy: Fay Duda; Allan Pidgeon; Karina Okotel; Trish Worth
- Leader: Malcolm Turnbull; Scott Morrison
- Preceded by: Richard Alston
- Succeeded by: John Olsen

29th Leader of the Opposition of New South Wales Election: 1984
- In office 15 March 1983 – 24 March 1988
- Premier: Neville Wran; Barrie Unsworth
- Deputy: Rosemary Foot; Peter Collins
- Preceded by: John Dowd
- Succeeded by: Bob Carr

Member of the New South Wales Parliament for Ku-ring-gai
- In office 13 September 1980 – 24 June 1992
- Preceded by: John Maddison
- Succeeded by: Stephen O'Doherty

Personal details
- Born: Nicholas Frank Hugo Greiner; 27 April 1947 (age 79) Budapest, Hungary
- Party: Liberal Party of Australia
- Spouse: Kathryn Greiner AO (m. 1970; sep. 2013)
- Children: 2
- Education: St Ignatius' College, Riverview; University of Sydney; Harvard Business School
- Occupation: Businessman, politician

Nicholas Frank Hugo Greiner (/ˈɡraɪnər/; born 27 April 1947) is an Australian politician who served as the 37th Premier of New South Wales from 1988 to 1992. Greiner was Leader of the New South Wales Division of the Liberal Party from 1983 to 1992 and Leader of the Opposition from 1983 to 1988. Greiner served as the Federal President of the Liberal Party of Australia from 2017 to 2020. He served as the Consul-General in the United States of America, New York from 2021 to 2023.

== Early life ==
Greiner was born in Budapest, Hungary to a Hungarian father and a Slovak mother. His mother was of half-Jewish ancestry and was imprisoned in a Nazi concentration camp during the Holocaust. His parents subsequently moved to Vienna before arriving in Australia in the early 1950s. He was educated at Saint Ignatius' College, Riverview in Sydney's lower North Shore, before graduating with honours in Economics at the University of Sydney. Later he attended Harvard Business School and achieved an MBA with High Distinction. After briefly working for an Idaho timber company, Greiner returned to Australia, where he joined the timber company that his family owned. Greiner has also held the position of Australian chairman of British American Tobacco.

== Political career ==
A member of the Liberal Party, Greiner unsuccessfully sought to enter the New South Wales Legislative Assembly for the safe Liberal seat of Willoughby in 1978. He defeated sitting member Laurie McGinty for Liberal preselection. Although defeated in his first bid to enter the legislature by local bus driver Eddie Britt as part of the "Wranslide" Labor victory that year Greiner successfully contested a 1980 by-election for the electorate of Ku-ring-gai.

Greiner successfully defended Ku-ring-gai in the 1981 state election, managing a modest swing in his favour even as the Liberal-National Country Coalition was cut down to only 28 seats in total. Shortly after the election, he ran for the party leadership, but lost to John Dowd. He was however appointed as Shadow Treasurer and Shadow Minister for Housing and Cooperatives. However, in 1983, Greiner ousted Dowd in a leadership challenge. Highlighting allegations of corruption against the Labor Party government of Premier Neville Wran during the 1984 election campaign, Greiner managed to pick up a seven percent swing and cut the Wran government's previously overwhelming majority in half, from 39 seats to 17. In the process, he regained much of what the Coalition had lost in the previous two "Wranslides." Wran retired in 1986, and was succeeded by Barrie Unsworth.

At the March 1988 election, Greiner led the Coalition to a landslide victory. The Coalition scored a swing of over 8 percent and took 22 seats from Labor, including several Labor heartland seats where the Coalition had not come close to winning in years.

== Premier of New South Wales ==
Greiner handed over a number of responsibilities previously associated with the Premier's Department to other ministers. However, in a rare move, he served as his own Treasurer (having retained the Shadow Treasurer's portfolio upon becoming party leader), thus concentrating considerable power in his hands. He decided to keep the Treasurer's post for himself in order to focus on repairing the State's parlous financial position.

The Greiner government, which promised "sensible, moderate but progressive" government, wasted no time in commencing its legislative agenda, announcing across-the-board spending cuts and plans to announce a mini-budget in June. A key government policy was to cut costs in education, including increasing charges for public education, eliminating free public transport for school students and reducing teaching staff (2,400 teaching staff and 800 support staff) through creating composite classes and closing smaller schools, while looking for public assets to sell (ultimately $340 million of assets were identified) and capital works projects which could be abandoned. However, it was forced to defer its plans to repeal Aboriginal land rights legislation (an election commitment) and reduce the power of the Ombudsman to investigate the police when Democrat and Call to Australia members of the Upper House combined with Labor to defeat these pieces of legislation.

By September 1988, having promised at the election to run the state like a business, the government were able to announce serious progress towards reducing the state debt and its first budget projected a surplus, and were trying to resolve housing pressures caused by rapidly increasing house prices (which rose from $65,000 to $165,000 in the twelve months to October). Another election promise realised by the new Government was to create the Independent Commission Against Corruption (ICAC) capable of investigating allegations of corruption and graft against the government and within the state. In its first year, it investigated large donations to the Labor and National parties. Despite significant pressure from the parliamentary Nationals, whose leader was implicated in one of the investigations, Greiner refused to budge or to dilute ICAC's powers.

By 1989, the government's position could be described as higher government charges and reduced government services. Increased taxes and fees on motor vehicle drivers, petrol, water, public transport and child care, as the aforementioned cuts to education took effect, the pay of health workers was frozen, workers' compensation to injured workers was limited (although this was later blocked by the Upper House) and state assets were sold off. A series of strikes on the part of teachers and the growing unpopularity of Education Minister Terry Metherell caused problems for the Greiner government during the latter stages of its first term. In August 1989, the Industrial Commission ruled against the government in determining that class sizes were an industrial issue rather than the sole discretion of the director-general. The government also cut rail services to the north coast, deeming them commercially unviable, and cut 8,000 State Rail Authority employees in an effort to offset the authority's $1 billion annual debt – however, this left the Pacific Highway as the only land transport link for several major towns, and in October and December 1989, two major crashes on the road, both involving passenger buses, claimed a combined total of 54 deaths and 55 injuries. While Opposition Leader Bob Carr made the link between pressure on roads and withdrawal of the country services, a coroner's report in April 1990 pinned the blame on the Federal Government and its "piecemeal" approach to repairs of the Pacific Highway. The government meanwhile reduced speed limits for heavy vehicles to 90 km/h after the accidents, but a work-to-rule campaign by the Transport Workers Union disrupted Sydney's peak-hour traffic and Greiner overrode the Transport Minister to restore the previous 100 km/h limit in late January 1990.

In May 1990, Greiner asked Metherell to try and resolve the ongoing battle with the state's teachers, and they were offered a 9% pay rise, although the disputes continued. Lecturers in the TAFE system, also within Metherell's portfolio, joined them after the government indicated its willingness to implement a report by a private management consultant envisaging a public-private partnership and massive staffing cuts. Metherell resigned from his position in 1990 but the disputes with teachers continued.

Regarded as a fiscal conservative, Greiner was still considered much further to the left than many of his fellow Liberals in terms of social policy. He criticised then Federal Opposition Leader John Howard's controversial comments on immigration policy during the late 1980s, and was widely respected within the ethnic community.

Buoyed by his government's strong performance in the polls, Greiner called a snap election for 25 May 1991. Despite widespread predictions by political and media commentators that Greiner would be easily re-elected to a second term, the impact of the government's policies, particularly in terms of service cuts and increased charges, caused many voters to turn back to Labor. The election saw the Coalition win 52 percent of the two-party vote. However, much of the Coalition margin was wasted on landslide margins in its heartland, while Labor took back many marginal seats it had lost in its severe defeat of three years prior. The result was a hung Parliament, with the Coalition one seat short of a majority. Greiner was forced into a minority government, relying on support from four Independent MPs. His parliamentary majority was further eroded with the decision of Terry Metherell to become an independent in late 1991, and with the loss of The Entrance in a 1992 by-election following a Court of Disputed Returns overthrowing the original result.

Greiner was only the second head of government at either federal or state level in Australia who was born outside the Commonwealth of Nations, the first being Chris Watson, Prime Minister in 1904.

=== ICAC investigation and resignation ===
Greiner and Environment Minister Tim Moore decided to offer Liberal-turned-independent MP Terry Metherell an executive position in the Environmental Protection Authority. If Metherell accepted the position, he would have to resign his parliamentary seat, which the Liberal Party was confident of winning in a by-election. While Metherell initially agreed to the position on 10 April 1992, it was criticised by Labor and the independents, and documents were ultimately released showing he had applied for a job in the Premier's Department and then been seconded to the EPA, and had applied after the closing date, but was appointed within hours of his application. Greiner was accused of misleading the House, and in late April, Labor and the independents passed a no-confidence motion in Greiner's leadership (though, critically, not against the government) in the Legislative Assembly. The pressure led to Greiner moving that the Assembly refer the matter to ICAC. The inquiry began on 5 May, and following detailed evidence by Metherell that his resignation was part of a package negotiated with Greiner and Moore and the release of Metherell's diaries, Greiner and backbencher Brad Hazzard admitted their statements to the inquiry were wrong. Greiner as a witness could not recall 20 key events under investigation, and the inquiry heard that the director-general appointed Metherell when it was discovered he could not legally be appointed to the EPA.

On 19 June, ICAC commissioner Ian Temby concluded that while Greiner had not acted criminally and had not set out to be corrupt, he would be seen "by a notional jury as conducting himself contrary to known and recognised standards of honesty and integrity". Temby found strongest against Environment Minister Tim Moore, a friend of Metherell's who was central to the offer. However, the Commission did not recommend taking action against the two ministers, saying that this was properly the role of Parliament. Greiner focused on the words "honesty and integrity" and argued he was only "technically corrupt", but by 21 June, it was clear the independents would support a vote of no confidence in Greiner and Moore. Greiner lodged a case with New South Wales Court of Appeal and argued any such motions would breach natural justice while the appeal was being heard, but Labor and the independents argued that the Parliament was the body which should decide Greiner's future. Labor tabled a no-confidence motion, which was due up for vote on 24 June. The independents told Greiner that unless he resigned, they would withdraw their support from the government and support the no-confidence motion. Accordingly, Greiner resigned, and was succeeded by John Fahey.

Greiner successfully appealed against the finding in the New South Wales Court of Appeal, which in a 2–1 vote on 21 August 1992 overturned the ICAC findings. The court found that ICAC had "exceeded its jurisdiction" in ruling against the two ministers and granted "declaratory relief that the Commission's report was wrong in law". Following the affair, a parliamentary committee inquiring into ICAC's powers in December 1992 recommended that Section 9 of the ICAC Act, on which the successful appeal was based, should be repealed as it was too narrow in defining corrupt conduct. While the section was not repealed, a sub-section was ultimately added in 1994 which addressed the behaviour of ministers and members of parliament, and gave legislative enforcement to ministerial and parliamentary codes of conduct. In 2018, Greiner revealed that if he had not resigned in 1992 he still would not have led the Coalition into the 1995 election as he had planned to step down in 1994.

== Subsequent career ==
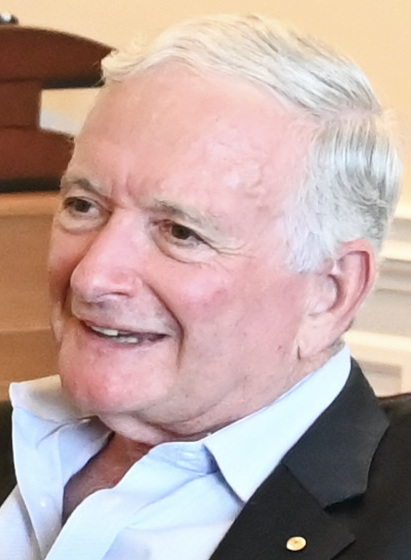
Greiner in 2021

In 1994, Greiner was made a Companion of the Order of Australia "for [his] service to public sector reform and management and to the community." In 2001, he received the Centenary Medal.

In the few years after leaving state politics, Greiner had been touted for a tilt at federal politics including the prospect of replacing Alexander Downer as federal Liberal leader and becoming prime minister by leading the Coalition to victory at the 1996 federal election but none of this eventuated. He went on to hold directorships with many Australian public companies. Greiner was chairman of the board of WD & HO Wills and then British American Tobacco Australia for the period 1996 to 2004. In 2011, he was Chairman of Bradken, Citigroup Australia, The Nuance Group, QBE Lenders' Mortgage Insurance, Blue Star Print Group and Playup; and Deputy Chairman of CHAMP Private Equity. In May 2011, Greiner was appointed as Chairman of Infrastructure NSW by the O'Farrell government. He also served as Chairman of the European Australian Business Council.

As of 2021, his website listed him as having held positions, mostly as chairman or deputy chairman, with:

- QBE Emerging Markets
- Accolade Wines
- Rearden Capital
- CHAMP Private Equity
- Rothschild Australia
- Crosby Textor Group
- Transurban (adviser)
- Harper & Row (Australasia)
- Coles Myer
- Stockland Trust
- Castle Harlan Australian Mezzanine

He contributed in many roles to the 2000 Summer Olympics in Sydney and Australian sport. He was President of the Bid Company, Director of the Organising Committee, and President of Squash and Soccer.

He was Federal President of the Liberal Party from 2017–2020. In February 2021, he became Consul-General for Australia in New York and the North-East United States.

On 17 June 2025, the Federal Executive of the Liberal Party of Australia appointed Greiner as Chair of the Management Committee established to oversee the federal intervention into the New South Wales Division of the Party, replacing the earlier Administrative Committee. He served in this role from 23 June 2025 until 30 March 2026.

== Personal ==
Greiner was married to Kathryn Greiner, a former Councillor in the Sydney City Council, and daughter of Sir Bede Callaghan (a former chairman of the Commonwealth Bank and Chancellor of University of Newcastle). They separated in 1995, then reconciled in 1996. In October 2013 it was announced that they had again separated. The couple have one son and one daughter. He is currently in a relationship with Carolyn Fletcher. The two each have six grandchildren.

New South Wales Legislative Assembly
| Preceded by John Maddison | Member for Ku-ring-gai; 1980 – 1992 | Succeeded by Stephen O'Doherty |
Political offices
| Preceded by John Dowd | Leader of the Opposition of New South Wales; 1983 – 1988 | Succeeded by Bob Carr |
| Preceded by Barrie Unsworth | Premier of New South Wales; 1988 – 1992 | Succeeded by John Fahey |
| Preceded by Ken Booth | Treasurer of New South Wales; 1988 – 1992 | Succeeded by John Fahey |
| Preceded by Barrie Unsworth | Minister for Ethnic Affairs; 1988 – 1992 | Succeeded by John Fahey |
Party political offices
| Preceded by John Dowd | Leader of the New South Wales Liberal Party; 1983 – 1992 | Succeeded by John Fahey |
| Preceded by Richard Alston | President of the Liberal Party of Australia; 2017 – date | Incumbent |
Government offices
| New title | Chairman of Infrastructure NSW; 2011 – 2013 | Succeeded by Graham Bradley |
