= Electoral district of Wakehurst =

Wakehurst New South Wales—Legislative Assembly
- Interactive map of district boundaries from the 2023 state election
- State: New South Wales
- Created: 1962
- MP: Michael Regan
- Party: Independent
- Namesake: John Loder, 2nd Baron Wakehurst
- Electors: 58,085 (2023)
- Demographic: Urban
Electorates around Wakehurst:
Pittwater	Pittwater	Pacific Ocean
Davidson	Wakehurst	Pacific Ocean
Willoughby	Manly	Manly

The Electoral district of Wakehurst is an electoral district of the Legislative Assembly in the Australian state of New South Wales. It covers a significant part of Sydney's Northern Beaches as well as parts of the Forest District. Created in 1962, it has been won by the Liberal Party at all but three elections over the last half-century.

== History ==
The seat of Wakehurst was created in the August 1961 electoral redistribution, with its territory drawn partly from the seats of Manly and Collaroy. First contested at the 1962 state election, Wakehurst was named in honour of the popular long-serving Governor of New South Wales from 1937 to 1946, Lord Wakehurst. It was held by the Liberal Party from its creation until the 1978 election, when it was won by the Labor Party as part of the first Wranslide. Although the seat is historically Liberal, Labor held the seat until the 1984 election, when the Liberals retook the seat.

The seat was first won in 1962 by Dick Healey of the Liberal Party. He moved to the new seat of Davidson in 1971. He served as a minister in the Coalition state government from 1973 to 1976, and retired in 1981. Wakehurst was won in 1971 by Allan Viney. He held the seat until his defeat in 1978 by the ALP's Tom Webster. Webster was re-elected at the 1981 election but was defeated in 1984 by Liberal candidate John Booth. Booth held the seat until 1991, when he lost preselection to Brad Hazzard. Hazzard joined the Coalition shadow frontbench after the 1995 election, and served as a minister in the O'Farrell, Baird, Berejiklian and Perrottet governments.

Hazzard retired at the 2023 NSW election, when the Mayor of Northern Beaches Council, Michael Regan, won the seat as an independent candidate.

== Geography ==
On its current boundaries, Wakehurst takes in the suburbs of Allambie, Allambie Heights, Bantry Bay, Beacon Hill, Collaroy, Collaroy Plateau, Cromer, Forestville, Killarney Heights, Narraweena, Oxford Falls and parts of Belrose, Brookvale, Dee Why and Frenchs Forest.

== Members for Wakehurst ==
Member	Party	Period
Dick Healey	Liberal	1962–1971
Allan Viney	Liberal	1971–1978
Tom Webster	Labor	1978–1984
John Booth	Liberal	1984–1991
Brad Hazzard	Liberal	1991–2023
Michael Regan	Independent	2023–present

== Election results ==
2023 New South Wales state election: Wakehurst
Party	Candidate	Votes	%	±%
Liberal	Toby Williams	18,940	36.9	−23.0
Independent	Michael Regan	18,430	35.9	+35.9
Labor	Sue Wright	7,617	14.8	−2.1
Greens	Ethan Hrnjak	4,000	7.8	−2.4
Animal Justice	Susan Sorensen	1,220	2.4	−0.8
Sustainable Australia	Greg Mawson	1,127	2.2	−0.7
Total formal votes		51,334	97.4	+0.3
Informal votes		1,353	2.6	−0.3
Turnout		52,687	90.7	+2.1
Notional two-party-preferred count
Liberal	Toby Williams	23,685	59.6	−12.3
Labor	Sue Wright	16,054	40.4	+12.3
Two-candidate-preferred result
Independent	Michael Regan	24,589	54.5	+54.5
Liberal	Toby Williams	20,555	45.5	−26.4
Independent gain from Liberal				
