= List of elections in 1930 =

The following elections occurred in the year 1930.

== Asia ==
- 1930 Persian legislative election
- 1930 Hong Kong sanitary board election
- 1930 Madras Presidency legislative council election
- 1930 Japanese general election
- 1930 Turkish local elections

== Europe ==
- 1930 Austrian legislative election
- 1930 Finnish parliamentary election
- 1930 Icelandic parliamentary election
- 1930 German federal election
- 1930 Latvian presidential election
- 1930 Liechtenstein by-election
- 1930 Liechtenstein local elections
- 1930 Liechtenstein referendums
- April 1930 Monegasque general election
- May 1930 Monegasque general election
- 1930 Norwegian parliamentary election
- 1930 Polish parliamentary election
- 1930 Romanian local elections
- 1930 Turkish local elections

=== Germany ===
- 1930 German federal election
- Brunswick Landtag election, 14 September 1930.

=== United Kingdom ===
- 1930 Bromley by-election
- 1930 East Renfrewshire by-election
- 1930 Fulham West by-election
- 1930 Glasgow Shettleston by-election
- 1930 North Norfolk by-election
- 1930 Nottingham Central by-election
- 1930 Paddington South by-election
- 1930 Sheffield Brightside by-election
- 1930 Shipley by-election
- 1930 Whitechapel and St George's by-election

== North America ==
=== Canada ===
- 1930 Canadian federal election
- 1930 Alberta general election
- 1930 Edmonton municipal election
- 1930 New Brunswick general election
- 1930 Sudbury municipal election
- 1930 Toronto municipal election

=== Caribbean ===
- 1930 Cuban parliamentary election
- 1930 Dominican Republic general election
- 1930 Haitian parliamentary election

=== United States ===
- 1930 New York state election
- 1930 United States elections

==== United States lieutenant gubernatorial ====
- 1930 California lieutenant gubernatorial election
- 1930 Connecticut lieutenant gubernatorial election
- 1930 Minnesota lieutenant gubernatorial election
- 1930 Nebraska lieutenant gubernatorial election
- 1930 Texas lieutenant gubernatorial election
- 1930 Wisconsin lieutenant gubernatorial election

==== United States gubernatorial ====
- 1930 Alabama gubernatorial election
- 1930 Arizona gubernatorial election
- 1930 Arkansas gubernatorial election
- 1930 California gubernatorial election
- 1930 Colorado gubernatorial election
- 1930 Connecticut gubernatorial election
- 1930 Georgia gubernatorial election
- 1930 Idaho gubernatorial election
- 1930 Iowa gubernatorial election
- 1930 Kansas gubernatorial election
- 1930 Maine gubernatorial election
- 1930 Maryland gubernatorial election
- 1930 Massachusetts gubernatorial election
- 1930 Michigan gubernatorial election
- 1930 Minnesota gubernatorial election
- 1930 Nebraska gubernatorial election
- 1930 Nevada gubernatorial election
- 1930 New Hampshire gubernatorial election
- 1930 New Mexico gubernatorial election
- 1930 New York gubernatorial election
- 1930 North Dakota gubernatorial election
- 1930 Ohio gubernatorial election
- 1930 Oklahoma gubernatorial election
- 1930 Oregon gubernatorial election
- 1930 Pennsylvania gubernatorial election
- 1930 Rhode Island gubernatorial election
- 1930 South Carolina gubernatorial election
- 1930 South Dakota gubernatorial election
- 1930 Tennessee gubernatorial election
- 1930 Texas gubernatorial election
- 1930 United States gubernatorial elections
- 1930 Vermont gubernatorial election
- 1930 Wisconsin gubernatorial election
- 1930 Wyoming gubernatorial election

==== United States House of Representatives ====
- 1930 United States House of Representatives elections
- 1930 United States House of Representatives elections in California
- 1930 United States House of Representatives elections in South Carolina

==== United States Senate ====
- 1930 United States Senate elections
- 1930 United States Senate election in Alabama
- 1930 United States Senate election in Arkansas
- 1930 United States Senate election in Colorado
- 1930 United States Senate election in Idaho
- 1930 United States Senate election in Illinois
- 1930 United States Senate election in Iowa
- 1930 United States Senate election in Kansas
- 1930 United States Senate special election in Kansas
- 1930 United States Senate election in Kentucky
- 1930 United States Senate election in Louisiana
- 1930 United States Senate election in Maine
- 1930 United States Senate election in Massachusetts
- 1930 United States Senate election in Michigan
- 1930 United States Senate election in Minnesota
- 1930 United States Senate election in Michigan
- 1930 United States Senate election in Montana
- 1930 United States Senate election in Nebraska
- 1930 United States Senate election in New Hampshire
- 1930 United States Senate election in New Jersey
- 1930 United States Senate special election in Ohio
- 1930 United States Senate election in Oklahoma
- 1930 United States Senate special election in Pennsylvania
- 1930 United States Senate election in South Carolina
- 1930 United States Senate election in South Dakota
- 1930 United States Senate election in Tennessee
- 1930 United States Senate election in Texas
- 1930 United States Senate election in Virginia
- 1930 United States Senate election in Wyoming

==== United States mayoral elections ====
- 1930 New Orleans mayoral election

== South America ==
- 1930 Argentine legislative election
- 1930 Brazilian presidential election
- 1930 Colombian presidential election
- 1930 Costa Rican parliamentary election
- Guatemalan presidential election, 17 December 1930
- Guatemalan presidential election, 29 December 1930
- 1930 Honduran legislative election
- 1930 Nicaraguan parliamentary election
- 1930 Uruguayan general election

== Oceania ==
=== Australia ===
- 1930 Lane Cove state by-election
- 1930 New South Wales state election
- 1930 South Australian state election
- 1930 Western Australian state election

== See also ==
- Category:1930 elections
