= Electoral results for the district of Lane Cove =

Election results for Lane Cove, New South Wales, Australia

Lane Cove, an electoral district of the Legislative Assembly in the Australian state of New South Wales, has had two incarnations, the first from 1904 to 1913, the second from 1927 to the present.

== Members for Lane Cove ==
First incarnation (1904–1913)
Election	Member	Party
1904	David Fell	Liberal Reform
1907	David Fell	Liberal Reform
1910	David Fell	Liberal Reform
Second incarnation (1927–present)
Election	Member	Party
1927	Bryce Walmsley	Nationalist
1930 by	Herbert FitzSimons	Nationalist
1930	Herbert FitzSimons	Nationalist
1932	Herbert FitzSimons	United Australia
1935	Herbert FitzSimons	United Australia
1938	Herbert FitzSimons	United Australia
1941	Herbert FitzSimons	United Australia
1944	Henry Woodward	Labor
1947	Ken McCaw	Liberal
1950	Ken McCaw	Liberal
1953	Ken McCaw	Liberal
1956	Ken McCaw	Liberal
1959	Ken McCaw	Liberal
1962	Ken McCaw	Liberal
1965	Ken McCaw	Liberal
1968	Ken McCaw	Liberal
1971	Ken McCaw	Liberal
1973	Ken McCaw	Liberal
1975 by	John Dowd	Liberal
1976	John Dowd	Liberal
1978	John Dowd	Liberal
1981	John Dowd	Liberal
1984	John Dowd	Liberal
1988	John Dowd	Liberal
1991	Kerry Chikarovski	Liberal
1995	Kerry Chikarovski	Liberal
1999	Kerry Chikarovski	Liberal
2003	Anthony Roberts	Liberal
2007	Anthony Roberts	Liberal
2011	Anthony Roberts	Liberal
2015	Anthony Roberts	Liberal
2019	Anthony Roberts	Liberal
2023	Anthony Roberts	Liberal

== Election results ==
=== Elections in the 2020s ===
==== 2023 ====
2023 New South Wales state election: Lane Cove
Party	Candidate	Votes	%	±%
Liberal	Anthony Roberts	23,463	45.1	−7.2
Labor	Penelope Pedersen	12,469	24.0	+3.8
Independent	Victoria Davidson	10,608	20.4	+20.4
Greens	Heather Armstrong	4,331	8.3	−2.1
Sustainable Australia	Ben Wise	1,189	2.3	+0.3
Total formal votes		52,060	98.1	+0.1
Informal votes		1,026	1.9	−0.1
Turnout		53,086	90.6	+1.6
Two-party-preferred result
Liberal	Anthony Roberts	26,245	55.5	−9.2
Labor	Penelope Pedersen	21,047	44.5	+9.2
Liberal hold		Swing	−9.2	

=== Elections in the 2010s ===
==== 2019 ====
2019 New South Wales state election: Lane Cove
Party	Candidate	Votes	%	±%
Liberal	Anthony Roberts	26,388	51.80	−5.35
Labor	Andrew Zbik	10,281	20.18	+0.05
Independent	Richard Quinn	5,959	11.70	+11.70
Greens	Pierre Masse	5,441	10.68	−4.13
Keep Sydney Open	Joanne Spiteri	1,836	3.60	+3.60
Sustainable Australia	Murray Fleming	1,036	2.03	+2.03
Total formal votes		50,941	97.92	+0.56
Informal votes		1,081	2.08	−0.56
Turnout		52,022	90.97	−0.69
Two-party-preferred result
Liberal	Anthony Roberts	29,042	64.35	−3.47
Labor	Andrew Zbik	16,092	35.65	+3.47
Liberal hold		Swing	−3.47	

==== 2015 ====
2015 New South Wales state election: Lane Cove
Party	Candidate	Votes	%	±%
Liberal	Anthony Roberts	27,789	57.1	−8.3
Labor	Andrew Zbik	9,790	20.1	+6.1
Greens	Pierre Masse	7,203	14.8	−2.7
Independent	Jim Sanderson	2,029	4.2	+4.2
Christian Democrats	Peter Colsell	1,060	2.2	−0.5
No Land Tax	Irma Di Santo	754	1.6	+1.6
Total formal votes		48,625	97.4	+0.4
Informal votes		1,317	2.6	−0.4
Turnout		49,942	91.7	+0.9
Two-party-preferred result
Liberal	Anthony Roberts	29,451	67.8	−9.5
Labor	Andrew Zbik	13,972	32.2	+9.5
Liberal hold		Swing	−9.5	

==== 2011 ====
2011 New South Wales state election: Lane Cove
Party	Candidate	Votes	%	±%
Liberal	Anthony Roberts	28,350	65.6	+13.4
Greens	Keith McIlroy	7,646	17.7	+3.0
Labor	Mario Tsang	6,046	14.0	−10.5
Christian Democrats	Esther Heng	1,174	2.7	+0.4
Total formal votes		43,216	97.4	0.0
Informal votes		1,173	2.6	0.0
Turnout		44,389	92.5	+0.6
Notional two-party-preferred count
Liberal	Anthony Roberts	30,093	77.3	+15.0
Labor	Mario Tsang	8,819	22.7	–15.0
Two-candidate-preferred result
Liberal	Anthony Roberts	29,556	75.7	+13.3
Greens	Keith McIlroy	9,496	24.3	+24.3
Liberal hold		Swing	+13.3	

=== Elections in the 2000s ===
==== 2007 ====
2007 New South Wales state election: Lane Cove
Party	Candidate	Votes	%	±%
Liberal	Anthony Roberts	21,579	52.3	+6.7
Labor	Gabrielle O'Donnell	10,094	24.4	−8.7
Greens	Shauna Forrest	6,059	14.7	−0.2
Democrats	Kate Botting	1,801	4.4	+1.6
Christian Democrats	Arie Baalbergen	960	2.3	+2.1
Unity	William Ho	806	2.0	−0.1
Total formal votes		41,299	97.4	−0.2
Informal votes		1,113	2.6	+0.2
Turnout		42,412	91.9	
Two-party-preferred result
Liberal	Anthony Roberts	23,365	62.4	+9.6
Labor	Gabrielle O'Donnell	14,101	37.6	−9.6
Liberal hold		Swing	+9.6	

==== 2003 ====
2003 New South Wales state election: Lane Cove
Party	Candidate	Votes	%	±%
Liberal	Anthony Roberts	18,302	46.4	−3.4
Labor	Gabrielle O'Donnell	12,894	32.7	+0.4
Greens	Shauna Forrest	6,162	15.6	+10.4
Democrats	Suzanne McGillivray	1,234	3.1	−6.1
Unity	Pei Li	835	2.1	+2.1
Total formal votes		39,427	97.5	−0.1
Informal votes		994	2.5	+0.1
Turnout		40,421	90.7	
Two-party-preferred result
Liberal	Anthony Roberts	19,343	53.2	−4.2
Labor	Gabrielle O'Donnell	17,002	46.8	+4.2
Liberal hold		Swing	−4.2	

=== Elections in the 1990s ===
==== 1999 ====
1999 New South Wales state election: Lane Cove
Party	Candidate	Votes	%	±%
Liberal	Kerry Chikarovski	19,896	49.8	+1.2
Labor	Brad Powe	12,911	32.3	+8.5
Democrats	David Harcourt-Norton	3,665	9.2	+3.8
Greens	Suzy Orme	2,060	5.2	+2.2
One Nation	Joanne May	1,092	2.7	+2.7
AAFI	Bernd Rindermann	357	0.9	+0.3
Total formal votes		39,981	97.7	+1.2
Informal votes		958	2.3	−1.2
Turnout		40,939	91.8	
Two-party-preferred result
Liberal	Kerry Chikarovski	21,379	57.4	−4.9
Labor	Brad Powe	15,846	42.6	+4.9
Liberal hold		Swing	−4.9	

==== 1995 ====
1995 New South Wales state election: Lane Cove
Party	Candidate	Votes	%	±%
Liberal	Kerry Chikarovski	18,579	54.6	−12.9
Labor	Cheryl Lawrence-Rowe	5,542	16.3	−1.9
No Aircraft Noise	Peter Astridge	4,658	13.7	+13.7
Democrats	Matthew Baird	1,882	5.5	−8.7
Greens	Cameron Little	1,753	5.1	+5.1
Independent	Ian Longbottom	1,626	4.8	+4.8
Total formal votes		34,040	96.9	+4.1
Informal votes		1,082	3.1	−4.1
Turnout		35,122	92.0	
Two-party-preferred result
Liberal	Kerry Chikarovski	22,165	70.2	−3.5
Labor	Cheryl Lawrence-Rowe	9,396	29.8	+3.5
Liberal hold		Swing	−3.5	

==== 1991 ====
1991 New South Wales state election: Lane Cove
Party	Candidate	Votes	%	±%
Liberal	Kerry Chikarovski	21,425	67.5	−5.0
Labor	Luther Weate	5,777	18.2	−7.1
Democrats	Simon Disney	4,531	14.3	+12.6
Total formal votes		31,733	92.8	−4.0
Informal votes		2,466	7.2	+4.0
Turnout		34,199	92.0	
Two-party-preferred result
Liberal	Kerry Chikarovski	22,537	73.7	0.0
Labor	Luther Weate	8,049	26.3	0.0
Liberal hold		Swing	0.0	

=== Elections in the 1980s ===
==== 1988 ====
1988 New South Wales state election: Lane Cove
Party	Candidate	Votes	%	±%
Liberal	John Dowd	20,871	72.6	+7.4
Labor	Gary Stainton	7,886	27.4	−0.6
Total formal votes		28,757	96.7	−1.4
Informal votes		980	3.3	+1.4
Turnout		29,737	92.2	
Liberal hold		Swing	+3.9	

==== 1984 ====
1984 New South Wales state election: Lane Cove
Party	Candidate	Votes	%	±%
Liberal	John Dowd	17,720	65.6	+7.5
Labor	Miron Shapira	7,446	27.6	−4.1
Democrats	Graham Baker	1,831	6.8	+0.2
Total formal votes		26,997	98.1	+0.5
Informal votes		515	1.9	−0.5
Turnout		27,512	91.4	+2.0
Two-party-preferred result
Liberal	John Dowd		69.2	+5.1
Labor	Miron Shapira		30.8	−5.1
Liberal hold		Swing	+5.1	

==== 1981 ====
1981 New South Wales state election: Lane Cove
Party	Candidate	Votes	%	±%
Liberal	John Dowd	15,511	58.1	+5.9
Labor	Miron Shapira	8,464	31.7	−7.8
Democrats	Gary Smith	1,750	6.6	−1.7
Independent	Rhody Thomas	966	3.6	+3.6
Total formal votes		26,691	97.6	
Informal votes		646	2.4	
Turnout		27,337	89.4	
Two-party-preferred result
Liberal	John Dowd	16,511	64.1	+6.6
Labor	Miron Shapira	9,264	35.9	−6.6
Liberal hold		Swing	+6.6	

=== Elections in the 1970s ===
==== 1978 ====
1978 New South Wales state election: Lane Cove
Party	Candidate	Votes	%	±%
Liberal	John Dowd	15,025	52.2	−13.0
Labor	Elizabeth Bishop	11,359	39.5	+8.6
Democrats	John Newman	2,380	8.3	+8.3
Total formal votes		28,764	98.1	−0.6
Informal votes		552	1.9	+0.6
Turnout		29,316	90.7	−1.8
Two-party-preferred result
Liberal	John Dowd	16,548	57.5	−8.9
Labor	Elizabeth Bishop	12,216	42.5	+8.9
Liberal hold		Swing	−8.9	

==== 1976 ====
1976 New South Wales state election: Lane Cove
Party	Candidate	Votes	%	±%
Liberal	John Dowd	18,846	65.2	+4.2
Labor	Alan Lees	8,922	30.9	+11.3
Australia	Elizabeth Poppleton	1,147	4.0	−8.9
Total formal votes		28,915	98.7	+1.2
Informal votes		371	1.3	−1.2
Turnout		29,286	92.5	+2.2
Two-party-preferred result
Liberal	John Dowd	19,188	66.4	−2.9
Labor	Alan Lees	9,720	33.6	+2.9
Liberal hold		Swing	−2.9	

==== 1975 by-election ====
1975 Lane Cove by-election Saturday 8 February
Party	Candidate	Votes	%	±%
Liberal	John Dowd	15,709	70.8	+9.8
Australia	Brian Johnson	5,870	26.4	+13.5
British Australia	Harry Marsh	622	2.8	
Total formal votes		22,201	97.7	+0.2
Informal votes		521	2.3	−0.2
Turnout		22,722	73.0	−17.3
Liberal hold		Swing	−69.3	

Ken McCaw (Liberal) resigned.

==== 1973 ====
1973 New South Wales state election: Lane Cove
Party	Candidate	Votes	%	±%
Liberal	Ken McCaw	16,681	61.0	+1.7
Labor	Robert Toner	5,367	19.6	−2.8
Australia	Malcolm Hilbery	3,540	12.9	+0.6
Democratic Labor	Francis Hernage	1,270	4.6	−1.5
Independent	Gregory Lewis	315	1.2	+1.2
Independent	Peter Livesey	174	0.6	+0.6
Total formal votes		27,347	97.5	
Informal votes		706	2.5	
Turnout		28,053	90.3	
Two-party-preferred result
Liberal	Ken McCaw	18,951	69.3	+0.2
Labor	Robert Toner	8,396	30.7	−0.2
Liberal hold		Swing	+0.2	

==== 1971 ====
1971 New South Wales state election: Lane Cove
Party	Candidate	Votes	%	±%
Liberal	Ken McCaw	15,494	59.3	−11.5
Labor	Ronald Gornall	5,854	22.4	−1.2
Australia	Malcolm Hilbery	3,208	12.3	+12.3
Democratic Labor	Reginald Lawson	1,590	6.1	+0.5
Total formal votes		26,146	98.4	
Informal votes		427	1.6	
Turnout		26,573	91.5	
Two-party-preferred result
Liberal	Ken McCaw	18,077	69.1	−6.1
Labor	Ronald Gornall	8,069	30.9	+6.1
Liberal hold		Swing	−6.1	

=== Elections in the 1960s ===
==== 1968 ====
1968 New South Wales state election: Lane Cove
Party	Candidate	Votes	%	±%
Liberal	Ken McCaw	18,170	70.8	−10.0
Labor	James Westerway	6,071	23.6	+23.6
Democratic Labor	Antony Liddle	1,439	5.6	−13.6
Total formal votes		25,680	96.6	
Informal votes		906	3.4	
Turnout		26,586	93.1	
Two-party-preferred result
Liberal	Ken McCaw	19,321	75.2	−5.6
Labor	James Westerway	6,359	24.8	+24.8
Liberal hold		Swing	−5.6	

==== 1965 ====
1965 New South Wales state election: Lane Cove
Party	Candidate	Votes	%	±%
Liberal	Ken McCaw	19,246	80.8	−19.2
Democratic Labor	Edward Connolly	4,583	19.2	+19.2
Total formal votes		23,829	93.7	
Informal votes		1,606	6.3	
Turnout		25,435	92.6	
Liberal hold		Swing	N/A	

==== 1962 ====
1962 New South Wales state election: Lane Cove
Party	Candidate	Votes	%	±%
Liberal	Ken McCaw	unopposed		
Liberal hold				

=== Elections in the 1950s ===
==== 1959 ====
1959 New South Wales state election: Lane Cove
Party	Candidate	Votes	%	±%
Liberal	Ken McCaw	16,842	69.6	
Labor	Arthur Braddock	6,556	27.1	
Democratic Labor	Mary Gray	816	3.4	
Total formal votes		24,214	98.5	
Informal votes		360	1.5	
Turnout		24,574	93.4	
Two-party-preferred result
Liberal	Ken McCaw	17,495	72.3	
Labor	Arthur Braddock	6,719	27.7	
Liberal hold		Swing		

==== 1956 ====
1956 New South Wales state election: Lane Cove
Party	Candidate	Votes	%	±%
Liberal	Ken McCaw	16,066	74.1	+8.7
Labor	Geoffrey O'Donnell	5,605	25.9	−8.7
Total formal votes		21,671	98.6	+0.5
Informal votes		316	1.4	−0.5
Turnout		21,987	93.1	+0.1
Liberal hold		Swing	+8.7	

==== 1953 ====
1953 New South Wales state election: Lane Cove
Party	Candidate	Votes	%	±%
Liberal	Ken McCaw	13,514	65.4	
Labor	Alan Bagot	7,153	34.6	
Total formal votes		20,667	98.1	
Informal votes		390	1.9	
Turnout		21,057	93.0	
Liberal hold		Swing		

==== 1950 ====
1950 New South Wales state election: Lane Cove
Party	Candidate	Votes	%	±%
Liberal	Ken McCaw	15,470	70.7	
Labor	Hugh Milne	6,425	29.3	
Total formal votes		21,895	98.7	
Informal votes		294	1.3	
Turnout		22,189	92.2	
Liberal hold		Swing		

=== Elections in the 1940s ===
==== 1947 ====
1947 New South Wales state election: Lane Cove
Party	Candidate	Votes	%	±%
Liberal	Ken McCaw	12,865	53.1	+26.8
Labor	Henry Woodward	10,289	42.5	−1.9
Communist	Leslie Greenfield	1,083	4.5	+4.5
Total formal votes		24,237	98.7	+1.5
Informal votes		316	1.3	−1.5
Turnout		24,553	95.9	+2.6
Liberal gain from Labor		Swing	N/A	

- Preferences were not distributed.

==== 1944 ====
1944 New South Wales state election: Lane Cove
Party	Candidate	Votes	%	±%
Labor	Henry Woodward	9,521	44.4	−2.3
Democratic	John Cramer	5,641	26.3	−20.5
Liberal Democratic	Norman Thomas	4,122	19.2	+19.2
Independent	George Holloway	2,168	10.1	+10.1
Total formal votes		21,451	97.2	−1.1
Informal votes		617	2.8	+1.1
Turnout		21,452	93.3	−0.2
Two-party-preferred result
Labor	Henry Woodward	11,143	51.9	+2.8
Democratic	John Cramer	10,309	48.1	−2.8
Labor gain from Democratic		Swing	+2.8	

==== 1941 ====
1941 New South Wales state election: Lane Cove
Party	Candidate	Votes	%	±%
United Australia	Herbert FitzSimons	9,669	46.8	
Labor	Arthur Treble	9,652	46.7	
Independent	Arthur Russell	1,337	6.5	
Total formal votes		20,658	98.3	
Informal votes		359	1.7	
Turnout		21,017	93.5	
Two-party-preferred result
United Australia	Herbert FitzSimons	10,523	50.9	
Labor	Arthur Treble	10,135	49.1	
United Australia hold		Swing		

=== Elections in the 1930s ===
==== 1938 ====
1938 New South Wales state election: Lane Cove
Party	Candidate	Votes	%	±%
United Australia	Herbert FitzSimons	unopposed		
United Australia hold				

==== 1935 ====
1935 New South Wales state election: Lane Cove
Party	Candidate	Votes	%	±%
United Australia	Herbert FitzSimons	14,018	83.3	+4.6
Centre	Eric Campbell	2,813	16.7	+16.7
Total formal votes		16,831	90.1	−8.5
Informal votes		1,852	9.9	+8.5
Turnout		18,683	96.3	0.0
United Australia hold		Swing	N/A	

==== 1932 ====
1932 New South Wales state election: Lane Cove
Party	Candidate	Votes	%	±%
United Australia	Herbert FitzSimons	14,402	78.7	+20.1
Labor (NSW)	Jack Fitzpatrick	3,894	21.3	−7.9
Total formal votes		18,296	98.6	0.0
Informal votes		251	1.4	0.0
Turnout		18,547	96.3	+1.1
Labor (NSW) hold		Swing		

==== 1930 ====
1930 New South Wales state election: Lane Cove
Party	Candidate	Votes	%	±%
Nationalist	Herbert FitzSimons	10,419	58.6	
Labor	Frederick Hutt	5,195	29.2	
Australian	Henry Macourt	2,147	12.1	
Communist	George Smith	32	0.2	
Total formal votes		17,793	98.6	
Informal votes		245	1.4	
Turnout		18,038	95.2	
Nationalist hold		Swing		

==== 1930 by-election ====
1930 Lane Cove state by-election
Party	Candidate	Votes	%	±%
Nationalist	Herbert FitzSimons	5,775	43.5	−14.3
Labor	Frederick Hutt	4,080	30.7	+8.0
Australian	Frederick Dunn	3,399	25.6	+6.0 (Note: Compared to results as an Independent Nationalist candidate at the 1927 election.)
Unlimited Revolutionary	Theodore McLennan	30	0.2	+0.2
Total formal votes		13,284	99.2	+0.6
Informal votes		113	0.8	−0.6
Turnout		13,397	72.8	−9.3
Two-party-preferred result
Nationalist	Herbert FitzSimons	7,160	58.9	+58.9
Labor	Frederick Hutt	4,990	41.1	+41.1
Nationalist hold		Swing	N/A	

=== Elections in the 1920s ===
==== 1927 ====
This section is an excerpt from 1927 New South Wales state election § Lane Cove

1927 New South Wales state election: Lane Cove
Party	Candidate	Votes	%	±%
Nationalist	Bryce Walmsley	7,618	57.8	
Labor	Edgar Nelson	2,987	22.7	
Ind. Nationalist	Frederick Dunn	2,585	19.6	
Total formal votes		13,190	98.6	
Informal votes		181	1.4	
Turnout		13,371	82.1	
Nationalist win		(new seat)		

District re-established

==== 1913–1927 ====
District abolished

=== Elections in the 1910s ===
==== 1910 ====
This section is an excerpt from 1910 New South Wales state election § Lane Cove

1910 New South Wales state election: Lane Cove
Party	Candidate	Votes	%	±%
Liberal Reform	David Fell	5,385	61.0	
Labour	Sydney Hutton	3,444	39.0	
Total formal votes		8,829	99.3	
Informal votes		67	0.7	
Turnout		8,896	68.7	
Liberal Reform hold				

=== Elections in the 1900s ===
==== 1907 ====
This section is an excerpt from 1907 New South Wales state election § Lane Cove

1907 New South Wales state election: Lane Cove
Party	Candidate	Votes	%	±%
Liberal Reform	David Fell	4,380	72.4	
Labour	Robert Boxall	1,673	27.6	
Total formal votes		6,053	96.6	
Informal votes		212	3.4	
Turnout		6,265	60.6	
Liberal Reform hold				

==== 1904 ====
This section is an excerpt from 1904 New South Wales state election § Lane Cove

1904 New South Wales state election: Lane Cove
Party	Candidate	Votes	%	±%
Liberal Reform	David Fell	3,395	65.8	
Labour	Sydney Hutton	1,765	34.2	
Total formal votes		5,160	99.6	
Informal votes		19	0.4	
Turnout		5,179	56.8	
Liberal Reform win		(new seat)		

Lane Cove was a new seat and consisted of parts St Leonards and the abolished seats of Ryde and Willoughby. the member for St Leonards was Edward Clark (Liberal Reform) who unsuccessfully contested that seat as an Independent Liberal Reform candidate. The member for Willoughby was Charles Wade (Liberal Reform) who successfully contested Gordon. The member for Ryde was Edward Terry (Independent) who did not contest the election.
