= 1930 United States gubernatorial elections =

← 1929	November 4, 1930; September 8, 1930 (ME)	1931 →

33 governorships
	Majority party	Minority party
Party	Democratic	Republican
Seats before	18	30
Seats after	25	21
Seat change	▲7	▼9
Seats up	11	22
Seats won	18	13
	Third party	Fourth party
Party	Farmer–Labor	Independent
Seats before	0	0
Seats after	1	1
Seat change	▲1	▲1
Seats up	0	0
Seats won	1	1
- Democratic gain Democratic hold Republican gain Republican hold Farmer-Labor gain Independent gain

United States gubernatorial elections were held in 1930, in 33 states, concurrent with the House and Senate elections, on November 4, 1930. Elections took place on September 8 in Maine.

== Results ==
State	Incumbent	Party	Status	Opposing candidates
Alabama	Bibb Graves	Democratic	Term-limited, Democratic victory	Benjamin M. Miller (Democratic) 61.82% Hugh A. Locke (Independent) 38.18%
Arizona	John C. Phillips	Republican	Defeated, 48.61%	George W. P. Hunt (Democratic) 51.39%
Arkansas	Harvey Parnell	Democratic	Re-elected, 81.18%	J. O. Livesay (Republican) 18.82%
California	Clement C. Young	Republican	Defeated in Republican primary, Republican victory	James Rolph Jr. (Republican) 72.15% Milton K. Young (Democratic) 24.11% Upton Sinclair (Socialist) 3.64% Scattering 0.09%
Colorado	William H. Adams	Democratic	Re-elected, 60.41%	Robert F. Rockwell (Republican) 38.06% Claud A. Bushnell (Socialist) 0.68% Lizabeth A. Williams (Farmer Labor) 0.44% William R. Dietrich (Communist) 0.24% Walter Moore (Liberal) 0.10% Perry M. Jones (Commonwealth Land) 0.08%
Connecticut	John H. Trumbull	Republican	Retired, Democratic victory	Wilbur L. Cross (Democratic) 49.91% Ernest E. Rogers (Republican) 48.64% Jasper McLevy (Socialist) 1.09% Robert S. Kling (Communist) 0.35%
Georgia	Lamartine Griffin Hardman	Democratic	Term-limited, Democratic victory	Richard B. Russell Jr. (Democratic) 100.00% (Democratic primary run-off results); Richard B. Russell Jr. 67.85% George Henry Carswell 32.15%
Idaho	H. C. Baldridge	Republican	Retired, Democratic victory	C. Ben Ross (Democratic) 56.03% John McMurray (Republican) 43.98%
Iowa	John Hammill	Republican	Retired to run for U.S. Senate, Republican victory	Dan W. Turner (Republican) 65.74% Fred P. Hagemann (Democratic) 33.60% John M. Smith (Farmer Labor) 0.45% William Patten (Communist) 0.22%
Kansas	Clyde M. Reed	Republican	Defeated in Republican primary, Democratic victory	Harry H. Woodring (Democratic) 34.96% Frank Haucke (Republican) 34.92% John R. Brinkley (Independent) (write-in) 29.50% J. B. Shields (Socialist) 0.62%
Maine (held, 8 September 1930)	William T. Gardiner	Republican	Re-elected, 55.06%	Edward C. Moran Jr. (Democratic) 44.94%
Maryland	Albert C. Ritchie	Democratic	Re-elected, 55.96%	William F. Broening (Republican) 42.78% Elisabeth Gilman (Socialist) 0.82% Robert W. Stevens (Labor) 0.27% Samuel Parker (Communist) 0.17%
Massachusetts	Frank G. Allen	Republican	Defeated, 48.18%	Joseph B. Ely (Democratic) 49.54% John W. Aiken (Socialist Labor) 1.19% Alfred B. Lewis (Socialist) 0.67% Harry J. Canter (Communist) 0.41%
Michigan	Fred W. Green	Republican	Retired, Republican victory	Wilber M. Brucker (Republican) 56.88% William A. Comstock (Democratic) 42.03% Joseph Billups (Workers) 0.47% George M. Campbell (Socialist) 0.46% Duly McCone (Prohibition) 0.16%
Minnesota	Theodore Christianson	Republican	Retired to run for U.S. Senate, Farmer-Labor victory	Floyd B. Olson (Farmer-Labor) 59.34% Raymond Park Chase (Republican) 36.31% Edward Indrehus (Democratic) 3.65% Karl Reeve (Communist) 0.70%
Nebraska	Arthur J. Weaver	Republican	Defeated, 49.25%	Charles W. Bryan (Democratic) 50.75%
Nevada	Frederick B. Balzar	Republican	Re-elected, 53.25%	Charles L. Richards (Democratic) 46.75%
New Hampshire	Charles W. Tobey	Republican	Retired, Republican victory	John G. Winant (Republican) 57.98% Albert W. Noone (Democratic) 41.80% Fred B. Chase (Communist) 0.22%
New Mexico	Richard C. Dillon	Republican	Term-limited, Democratic victory	Arthur Seligman (Democratic) 53.17% Clarence M. Botts (Republican) 46.60% Sam Butler (Socialist) 0.23%
New York	Franklin D. Roosevelt	Democratic	Re-elected, 56.49%	Charles H. Tuttle (Republican) 33.36% Robert P. Carroll (Law Preservation) 6.08% Louis Waldman (Socialist) 3.21% William Z. Foster (Communist) 0.58% Jeremiah D. Crowley (Socialist Labor) 0.29%
North Dakota	George F. Shafer	Republican	Re-elected, 73.62%	Pierce Blewett (Democratic) 23.20% Pat J. Barrett (Communist) 3.18%
Ohio	Myers Y. Cooper	Republican	Defeated, 47.20%	George White (Democratic) 52.80%
Oklahoma	William J. Holloway	Democratic	Term-limited, Democratic victory	William H. Murray (Democratic) 59.05% Ira A. Hill (Republican) 40.79% B. G. Bingham (Independent) 0.11% John Franing (Independent) 0.06%
Oregon	A. W. Norblad	Republican	Defeated in Republican primary, Independent victory	Julius L. Meier (Independent) 54.51% Ed F. Bailey (Democratic) 25.10% Phil Metschan (Republican) 18.83% Albert Streiff (Socialist) 1.57%
Pennsylvania	John Stuchell Fisher	Republican	Term-limited, Republican victory	Gifford Pinchot (Republican) 50.77% John M. Hemphill (Democratic) 47.98% James Hudson Maurer (Socialist) 1.00% Frank Mozer (Communist) 0.25%
Rhode Island	Norman S. Case	Republican	Re-elected, 50.53%	Theodore F. Green (Democratic) 48.95% Charles H. Dana (Socialist) 0.53%
South Carolina	John Gardiner Richards Jr.	Democratic	Term-limited, Democratic victory	Ibra Charles Blackwood (Democratic) 100.00% (Democratic primary run-off results); Ibra Charles Blackwood 50.21% Olin Johnston 49.80%
South Dakota	William J. Bulow	Democratic	Retired to run for U.S. Senate, Republican victory	Warren E. Green (Republican) 52.97% D. A. McCullough (Democratic) 46.23% Helen Tangen (Independent) 0.80%
Tennessee	Henry H. Horton	Democratic	Re-elected, 63.84%	C. Arthur Bruce (Republican) 35.62% Samuel Borenstein (Independent) 0.54%
Texas	Dan Moody	Democratic	Retired, Democratic victory	Ross S. Sterling (Democratic) 79.98% William E. Talbot (Republican) 19.69% L. L. Rhodes (Socialist) 0.26% J. Stedham (Communist) 0.07%
Vermont	John E. Weeks	Republican	Retired to run for U.S. House, Republican victory	Stanley Calef Wilson (Republican) 70.98% Park H. Pollard (Democratic) 28.94% Scattering 0.09%
Wisconsin	Walter J. Kohler Sr.	Republican	Defeated in Republican primary, Republican victory	Philip La Follette (Republican) 64.76% Charles E. Hammersley (Democratic) 28.02% Frank B. Metcalfe (Socialist) 4.22% Alfred B. Taynton (Prohibition) 2.44% Fred B. Blair (Independent Communist) 0.49% Scattering 0.07%
Wyoming	Frank C. Emerson	Republican	Re-elected, 50.58%	Leslie A. Miller (Democratic) 49.42%

== See also ==
- 1930 United States elections
  - 1930 United States Senate elections
  - 1930 United States House of Representatives elections
