= 1930 Lane Cove state by-election =

- 26 July 1930

Electoral district of Lane Cove in the New South Wales Legislative Assembly
- Registered: 18,396
- Turnout: 72.8% (▼9.3)
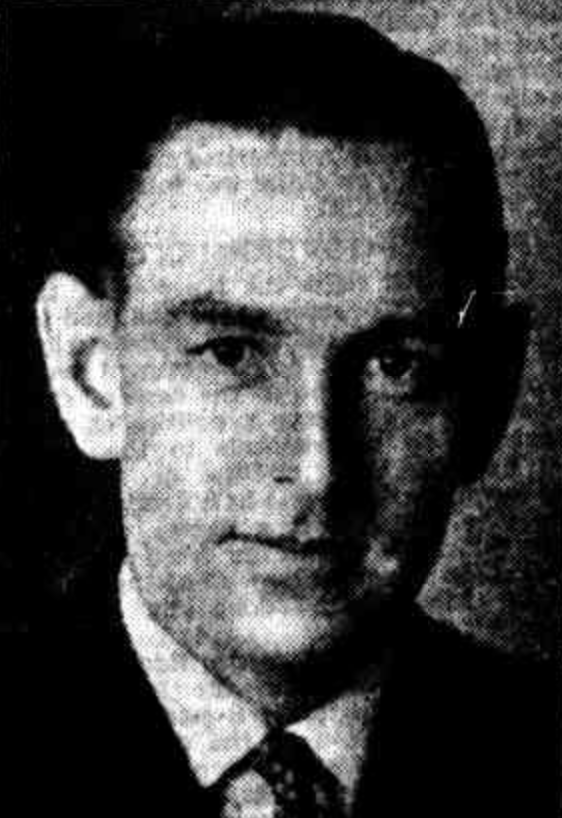

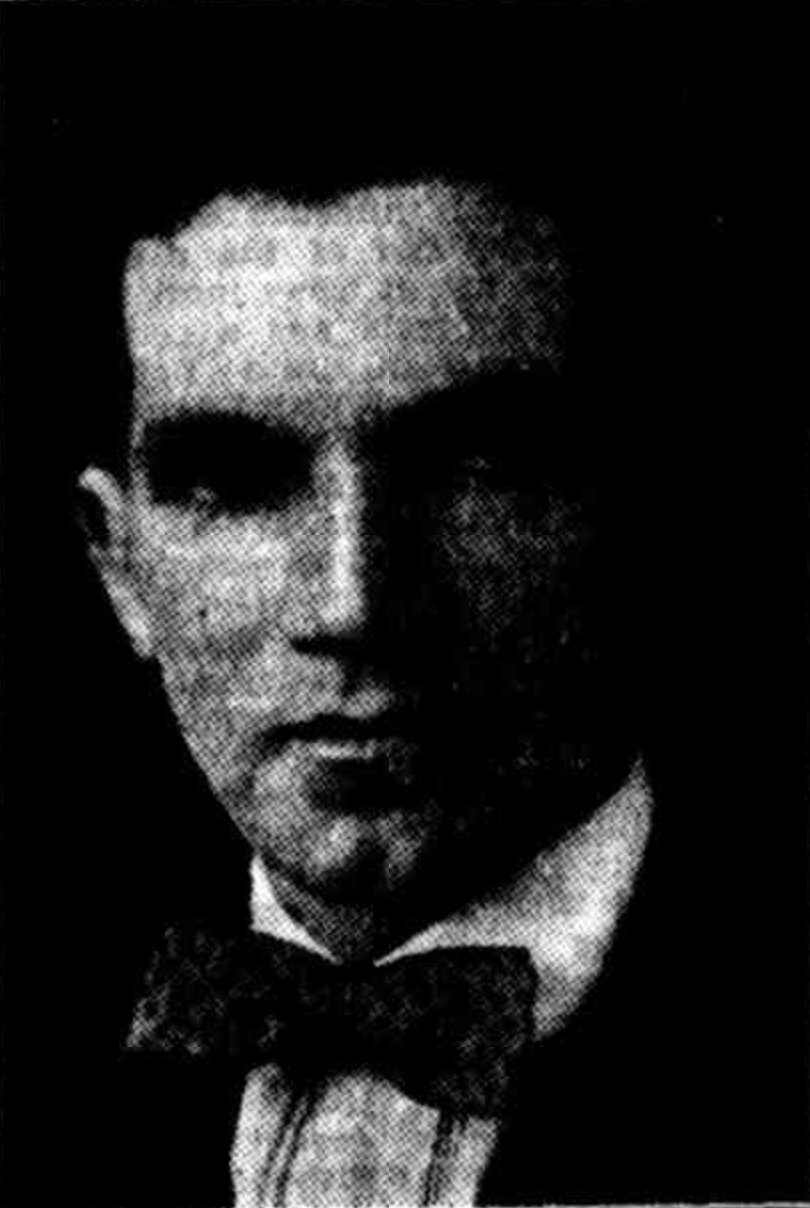

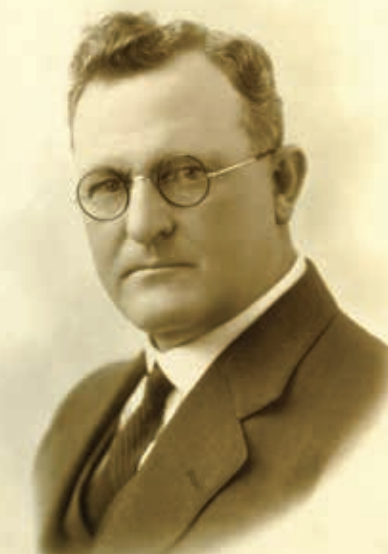
	First party	Second party	Third party
Candidate	Herbert FitzSimons	Frederick Hutt	Frederick Dunn
Party	Nationalist	Labor	Australian
Primary vote	5,775	4,080	3,399
Percentage	43.5%	30.7%	25.6%
Swing	▼14.3	▲8.0	▲6.0 (Note: Compared to results as an Independent Nationalist candidate at the 1927 election.)
2CP	58.9%	41.1%
2CP swing	▲58.9	▲41.1
MP before election
Bryce Walmsley
Nationalist
Elected MP
Herbert FitzSimons
Nationalist

The 1930 Lane Cove state by-election was held on 26 July 1930 to elect the member for Lane Cove in the New South Wales Legislative Assembly, following the death of Nationalist Party MP Bryce Walmsley.

The seat was retained for the Nationalists by Herbert FitzSimons, although the party lost 14.3% of its primary vote. FitzSimons was not sworn in as an MP before parliament was dissolved for the state election on 25 October 1930, where he retained the seat.

This was the first election contested by the Australian Party, which had been formed in December 1929, and it has been suggested that the party would have won the by-election if Labor did not run a candidate.

== Key events ==
- 21 June 1930 − Bryce Walmsley dies
- 7 July 1930 − Writ of election issued by the Speaker of the Legislative Assembly
- 14 July 1930 − Candidate nominations
- 26 July 1930 − Polling day
- 28 July 1930 − Result declared
- 9 August 1930 − Return of writ

== Candidates ==
Party	Candidate	Background
Australian	Frederick Dunn	Lane Cove alderman, former mayor, and Independent Nationalist candidate in 1927
Nationalist	Herbert FitzSimons	Printer and son of former MP William FitzSimons
Labor	Frederick Hutt	Federal president of the Meat Employees Union
Unlimited Revolutionary	Theodore McLennan	"Corn killer" and founder of the Australian Unlimited Social and Economic Revolutionary Party

== Results ==
1930 Lane Cove state by-election
Party	Candidate	Votes	%	±%
Nationalist	Herbert FitzSimons	5,775	43.5	−14.3
Labor	Frederick Hutt	4,080	30.7	+8.0
Australian	Frederick Dunn	3,399	25.6	+6.0
Unlimited Revolutionary	Theodore McLennan	30	0.2	+0.2
Total formal votes		13,284	99.2	+0.6
Informal votes		113	0.8	−0.6
Turnout		13,397	72.8	−9.3
Two-party-preferred result
Nationalist	Herbert FitzSimons	7,160	58.9	+58.9
Labor	Frederick Hutt	4,990	41.1	+41.1
Nationalist hold		Swing	N/A	

== See also ==
- Electoral results for the district of Lane Cove
- List of New South Wales state by-elections
