= 1975 Lane Cove state by-election =

- 8 February 1975

Electoral district of Lane Cove in the New South Wales Legislative Assembly
	First party	Second party
		AUS
Candidate	John Dowd	Brian Johnson
Party	Liberal	Australia
Primary vote	15,709	5,870
Percentage	70.8%	26.4%
Swing	▲9.8	▲26.4
MP before election
Ken McCaw
Liberal
Elected MP
John Dowd
Liberal

A by-election was held for the New South Wales Legislative Assembly electorate of Lane Cove on 8 February 1975 because of the resignation of Attorney General Ken McCaw (Liberal).

The Pittwater by-election was held on the same day.

== Dates ==
Date	Event
3 January 1975	Resignation of Ken McCaw.
7 January 1975	Writ of election issued by the Speaker of the Legislative Assembly.
20 January 1975	Nominations
8 February 1975	Polling day
28 February 1975	Return of writ

== Results ==
1975 Lane Cove by-election Saturday 8 February
Party	Candidate	Votes	%	±%
Liberal	John Dowd	15,709	70.8	+9.8
Australia	Brian Johnson	5,870	26.4	+13.5
British Australia	Harry Marsh	622	2.8	
Total formal votes		22,201	97.7	+0.2
Informal votes		521	2.3	−0.2
Turnout		22,722	73.0	−17.3
Liberal hold		Swing	−69.3	

The Labor Party did not contest the election.

== See also ==
- Electoral results for the district of Lane Cove
- List of New South Wales state by-elections
