= Australian Party =

Political party in Australia

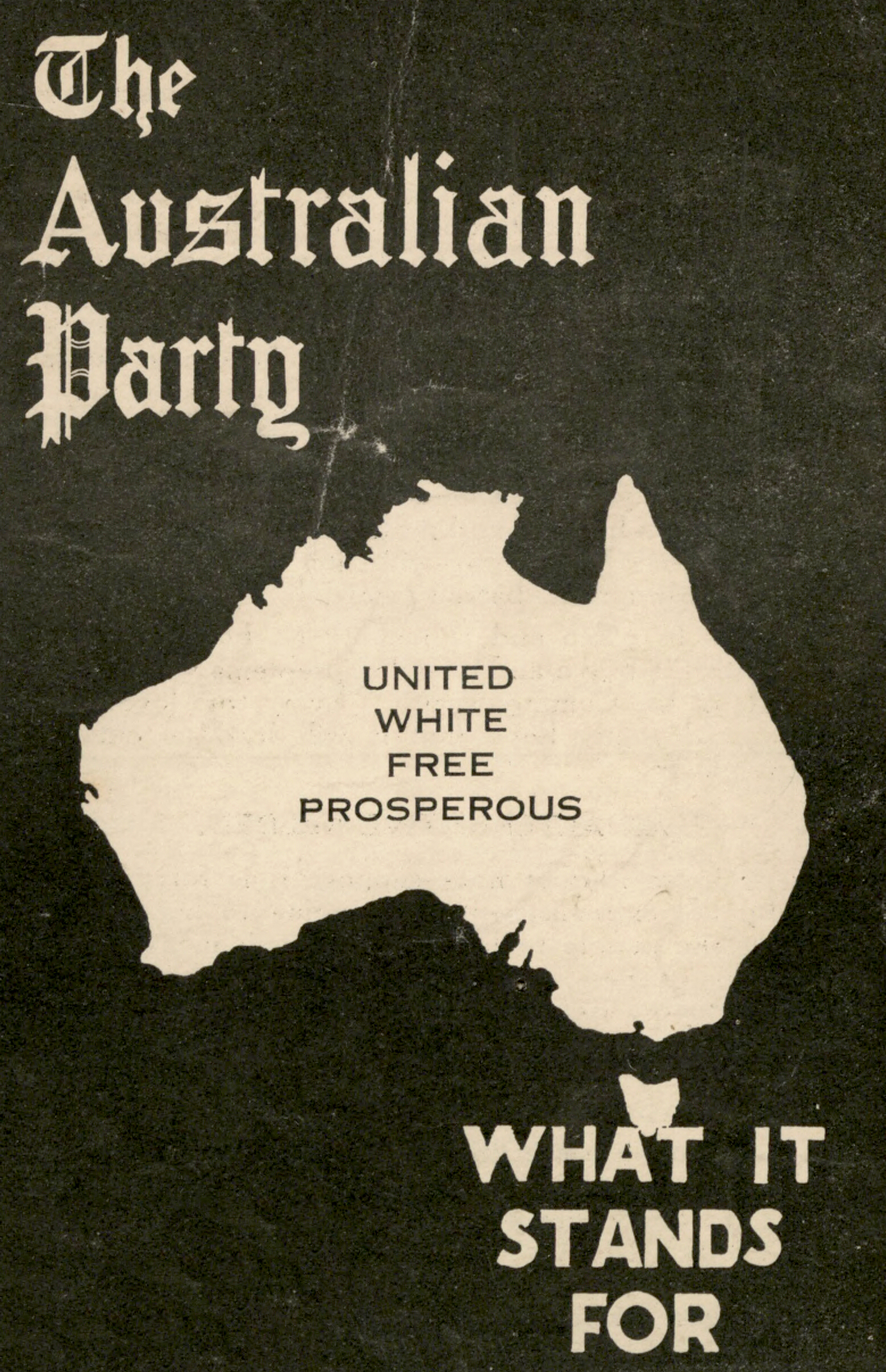
- Cover page of the party's 1930 manifesto
- Leader: Billy Hughes
- Founder: Billy Hughes
- Founded: 2 December 1929
- Dissolved: 7 May 1931; 94 years ago
- Split from: Nationalist
- Merged into: United Australia Party
- Membership (1930/31): ▲ <8,600 (Note: Combined number of members in Victoria and South Australia.)
- Ideology: Economic nationalism; Australian nationalism; Unitarism; White Australia; Anti-internationalism
- Slogan: “United, White, Free, Prosperous”
- House of Representatives: 3 / 75 (1929–1931)
- Senate: 2 / 36 (1929–1932)

The Australian Party was a political party founded and led by former Australian prime minister Billy Hughes after his expulsion from the Nationalist Party. The party was formed in 1929, and at its peak had five members of federal parliament. It was merged into the new United Australia Party in 1931, having never contested a federal election.

== History ==
=== Background ===
Billy Hughes was a former prime minister who had been successively a member of the Labor Party, the National Labor Party, and the Nationalist Party. By 1928, he was the de facto leader of a group of backbenchers hostile to the government of Stanley Bruce (who had replaced him as Nationalist leader in 1923). He and his supporters began to frequently cross the floor and vote against the government, particularly on the controversial subject of industrial relations. On 22 August 1929, Hughes and Edward Mann were expelled from the Nationalist Party for voting in favour of an unsuccessful censure motion against the government. Tensions finally came to a head on 10 September, when Hughes successfully moved an amendment to the government's flagship Maritime Industries Bill. Bruce took this to be a vote of no confidence, and called an election for 12 October. Labor under James Scullin won a landslide victory, while Hughes and two other ex-Nationalists were re-elected as independents.

=== Formation ===
After the 1929 election, Hughes made unsuccessful attempts to rejoin both the Nationalists and the Labor Party, in the hopes that he could return as prime minister. He eventually resolved to form his own party, which he hoped would secure the balance of power. The new party was launched on 2 December 1929. Four other federal MPs joined Hughes as members—Walter Marks, George Maxwell, and Senators Walter Duncan and Walter Massy-Greene. The press regarded the Australian Party as a simply a vehicle for Hughes' ambitions; The Sun, a Sydney tabloid, was the only newspaper to give it favourable publicity. The party claimed 75 branches and 4,000 members at its peak, but the only real activity took place in the electorates of its MPs. It was predominantly based in New South Wales, with a limited presence in Victoria and abortive attempts to expand to South Australia. Hughes and Marks were the party's chief financial backers, because membership fees were deliberately kept low and one of the party's planks was to refuse corporate donations. However, Hughes in particular was stingy with his money, sending the party treasurer only £100 out of a requested £250 for expenses and even then complaining about the cost.

=== Elections ===
The first election the Australian Party contested was a by-election to the New South Wales Legislative Assembly in July 1930, in the Lane Cove constituency. With Frederick Dunn (a former mayor of Lane Cove) as its candidate, the party polled 25.6% of the vote, putting it in third place behind Labor (30.7%) and the Nationalists (43.5%). Despite it being a safe seat for the Nationalists, it was suggested by some that the Australian Party would have won if Labor had not contested the election.

At the October 1930 state election in New South Wales, the Australian Party fielded candidates in 18 seats (all but two in Sydney). It polled 9.8% of the vote in seats it contested, but only 2.1% state-wide. The campaign was widely regarded as a failure, given that the party had hoped to win multiple seats. Hughes had little interest in state politics, and campaigned mainly on federal issues. He presented his party as an alternative to the incumbent Nationalist government of Thomas Bavin, but anti-government voters overwhelmingly voted for Jack Lang's Labor Party, which won a landslide victory with 55.0% of the vote. Hughes complained frequently about the lack of press coverage his party received, calling the media "as conformist as fascist Italy or Soviet Russia in following a party line".

=== Demise ===
George Maxwell resigned from the party in May 1930 to rejoin the Nationalists, citing policy differences. The party secretary, W. F. Jackson, did likewise in August, personally attacking Hughes in an open letter to The Sydney Morning Herald. In September, Hughes published a 16-page pamphlet titled "Bond or Free? Sir Otto Niemeyer’s Report", which sold nearly 50,000 copies in a month (at threepence each). It was widely quoted in newspapers. The statement effectively placed the Australian Party to the left of the federal Labor government on economic issues, and close to the radical views held by Lang Labor. The Sun withdrew its support of the party, and Walter Marks resigned his membership, citing Hughes' failure to consult him. Massy-Greene also resigned in December 1930 to re-join the Nationalist Party.

The Australian Party virtually ceased to exist after the 1930 state election. On 15 April 1931, John Latham—the Nationalist leader and leader of the opposition—wrote to Hughes, Joseph Lyons, and Earle Page suggesting that they unify their parties and factions and form a united opposition to the Scullin government. Hughes and Lyons accepted, and the new United Australia Party (UAP) officially came into existence on 7 May, with Lyons as leader. Hughes and Walter Duncan, the Australian Party's sole remaining parliamentary members, joined the new UAP, as did Marks and Maxwell.

Hughes' biographer Laurie Fitzhardinge wrote of the Australian Party: "The party had no popular roots, but had been created from above, and only the untiring efforts of Hughes and Duncan kept it going. It lacked experience, it lacked a coherent programme, and above all it lacked finance".

== Platform ==
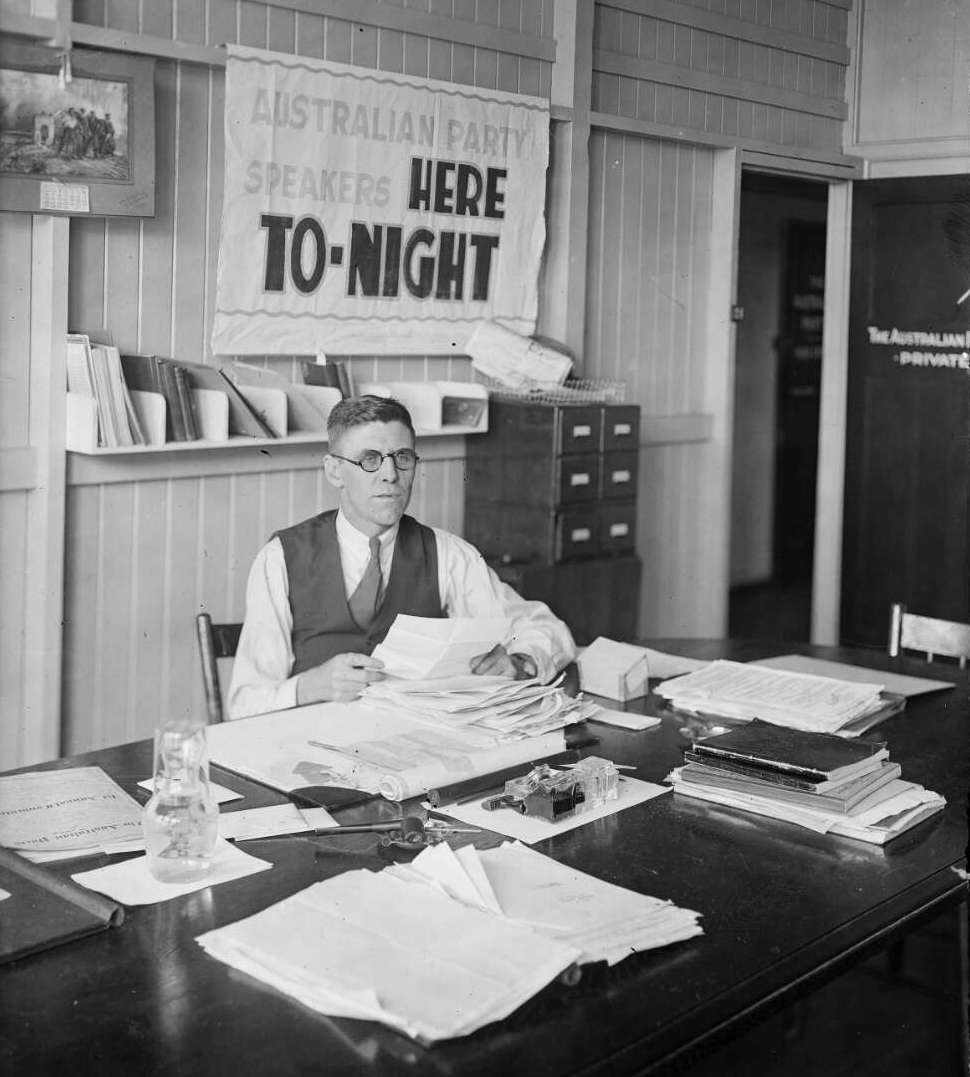
Arthur O'Keefe, secretary of the Australian Party, at the party's office in Sydney.

The Australian Party presented itself as apolitical. It had a "vague and eclectic platform" which mixed left-wing populism and economic nationalism. Hughes wanted the party to be "democratic and progressive […] indeed so democratic that any Labor man may join and support it". Some policies were more or less lifted directly from the Labor platform, such as the abolition of state governors and legislative councils. Hughes nonetheless denounced the Labor Party as controlled by communists, while simultaneously attacking the Nationalists as responsible for the Great Depression. Other Australian Party policies reflected Hughes' pet interests, such as amending the constitution to increase the federal government's powers over commerce and industrial relations. In general the party platform put forward few specifics, and the party was almost wholly reliant on the personal appeal of Hughes for its support.

== Notable members ==
=== Members of parliament ===
- Billy Hughes
- Walter Duncan
- Walter Marks
- Walter Massey-Greene
- George Maxwell

=== Other members ===
- Stan Lloyd
- John Waddell
