= 17 December 1930 Guatemalan presidential election =

Presidential election in Guatemala

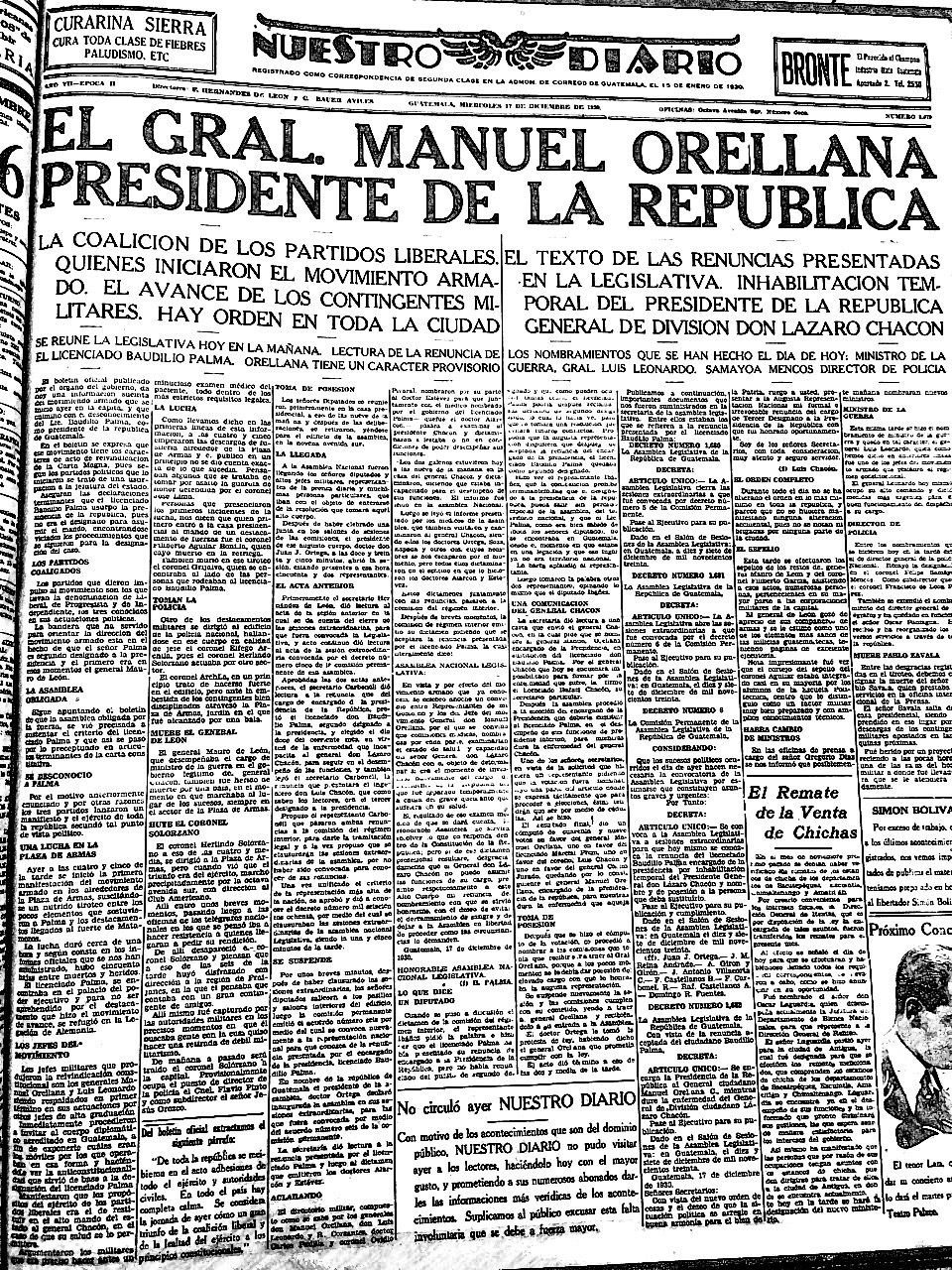
Front page of Nuestro Diario on 18 December 1930, where it is informed that de facto leader Orellana Contreras was appointed President of Guatemala by Congress.

Indirect presidential elections were held in Guatemala on 17 December 1930. After suffering a stroke, incumbent president Lázaro Chacón resigned on 12 December 1930, after which Baudilio Palma became acting president. However, on 16 December general Manuel María Orellana Contreras led a coup that forced Palma to resign. The following day Congress elected Orellana Contreras as provisional president.

However, given the large investments that American companies had in Guatemala, especially the United Fruit Company, the United States Secretary of State Henry Stimson publicly denounced Orellana as an unconstitutional leader and demanded his removal. Realizing that the Americans would not recognize his government, Orellana resigned on 29 December, leading to another election in which José María Reina Andrade was elected. Eventually, general Jorge Ubico came into power in 1931, and ruled Guatemala with a tight grip until he was deposed on 1 July 1944; during his rule, the power and influence of the United Fruit Company strengthened in Guatemala.

== Bibliography ==
- Dosal, Paul J. (1993). Doing business with the dictators: a political history of United Fruit in Guatemala, 1899-1944. Wilmington: Scholarly Resources.
