= 1930 Texas lieutenant gubernatorial election =

- November 4, 1930

Nominee	Edgar E. Witt	H. B. Tanner
Party	Democratic	Republican
Popular vote	274,415	40,492
Percentage	86.88%	12.82%
Lieutenant Governor before election
Barry Miller
Democratic
Elected Lieutenant Governor
Edgar E. Witt
Democratic

The 1930 Texas lieutenant gubernatorial election was held on November 4, 1930, in order to elect the lieutenant governor of Texas. Democratic nominee and incumbent member of the Texas Senate Edgar E. Witt defeated Republican nominee H. B. Tanner.

== General election ==
On election day, November 4, 1930, Democratic nominee Edgar E. Witt won the election by a margin of 233,923 votes against his opponent Republican nominee H. B. Tanner, thereby retaining Democratic control over the office of lieutenant governor. Witt was sworn in as the 29th lieutenant governor of Texas on January 20, 1931.

=== Results ===
Texas lieutenant gubernatorial election, 1930
Party	Candidate	Votes	%
Democratic	Edgar E. Witt	274,415	86.88
Republican	H. B. Tanner	40,492	12.82
	Scattering	965	0.30
Total votes		315,872	100.00
Democratic hold			
