= David Fell (politician) =

Australian politician (1869–1956)

David Fell (9 March 1869 – 6 January 1956) was a Scottish-born Australian politician.

He was born at Langside in Glasgow to ship broker Captain John Wilson Fell and Jessie McKinlay Power. He was educated at Dollar Academy and Graham's Academy in Scotland, and then at Fort Street High School in Sydney, where he arrived in 1879. He worked as an accountant after leaving school, establishing his own firm in 1893. In 1895 he married Mabel Bryce; they would have six children. He was a founding member of the Fellow of Corporation of Accountants of Australasia, and was director of Sydney Hospital from 1896 to 1900. His early political involvement included founding the City Reformists and Preferential League in 1895 and serving as honorary secretary to Sir James Graham in his early campaigns. In 1904 Fell was elected to the New South Wales Legislative Assembly as the Liberal member for Lane Cove. He never held a ministry and retired in 1913, but he was actively involved in the formation of the Nationalist Party in 1917. After the war, he opened an office in London and was thereafter primarily in the United Kingdom. On 24 July 1919 he married Alice Florence Elibank at Hove. He died at Hove in 1956.

His brother, William Scott Fell, was also a member of the New South Wales Parliament. He was a cousin of John Fell.

New South Wales Legislative Assembly
New district	Member for Lane Cove; 1904–1913	District abolished
