= George Henry Carswell =

American politician

George Henry Carswell (b. October 21, 1874-d. 1935) was an American politician from the state of Georgia.

== Biography ==
Born in Irwinton, Carswell graduated from Mercer University. He served in various roles in the local community of Wilkinson County, including serving as the first Solicitor of Wilkinson County, serving as president of the Irwinton Bank, and a single term as Chair of the Wilkinson County Board of Education. He was elected to nine years in the Georgia House of Representatives and six years in the Georgia Senate, rising to become Governor's House Floor Leader for Hugh Dorsey (1917-1920) and the President of the Senate (1925-1926). In 1928, he was appointed by Governor Lamartine Griffin Hardman as Georgia Secretary of State, succeeding to the position following the death of Samuel Guyton McLendon in office. After serving a single term in office, Carswell made an unsuccessful run for governor in 1930, losing the Democratic primary in a runoff to House Speaker Richard Russell Jr.

== Personal life ==
Carswell and his wife, Ellen Wood, had five children, one of whom, G. Harrold Carswell, became a federal judge.
