= Kerry Chikarovski =

Australian politician

Kerry Chikarovski AM
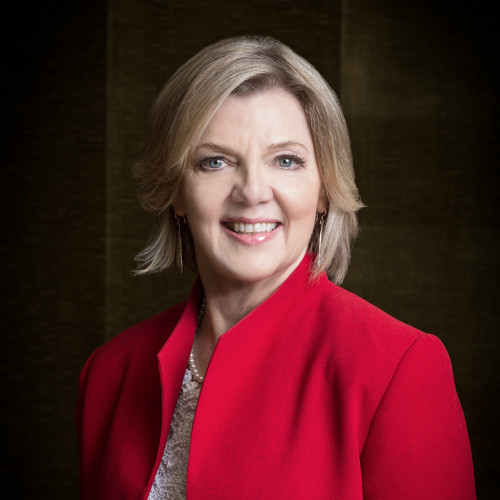

Leader of the Opposition of New South Wales Elections: 1999
- In office 8 December 1998 – 28 March 2002
- Premier: Bob Carr
- Preceded by: Peter Collins
- Succeeded by: John Brogden

Member of the New South Wales Parliament for Lane Cove
- In office 25 May 1991 – 20 March 2003
- Preceded by: John Dowd
- Succeeded by: Anthony Roberts

Personal details
- Born: Kerry Anne Bartels; 4 April 1956 (age 70) Sydney, New South Wales, Australia
- Party: Liberal
- Other political affiliations: Coalition
- Education: University of Sydney

Kerry Anne Chikarovski AM (née Bartels; 4 April 1956) is an Australian former politician who served as leader of the Liberal Party in New South Wales and Leader of the Opposition between 1998 and 2002, the first woman to hold either role.

Chikarovski represented the electoral district of Lane Cove in the Legislative Assembly of New South Wales from 1991 to 2003. She variously served as Minister for Consumer Affairs, Minister for Industrial Relations, Minister for Employment and Minister for Women in the Liberal-National Coalition governments of Premier John Fahey.

== Early life and career ==
Chikarovski was born in Sydney to Jill and former Willoughby Mayor Greg Bartels AM. In 1964, her father took up a post working at the United Nations headquarters in New York, and she, along with her mother and three sisters, also moved, living there for the next five years. It was while living in New York that Chikarovski had a brief encounter with Robert F. Kennedy, which would influence her decision to go into politics years later.

Upon returning to Sydney, Chikarovski finished her schooling at Monte Sant' Angelo Mercy College, in North Sydney. She completed a combined economics and law degree (earning B.Ec. and LL.B) at the University of Sydney. While at university she joined the Economics Society, followed by the Law Society, where she was eventually elected as its first female president. She was also elected to the Board of the University of Sydney Union.

While at university, Chikarovski met her future husband, Kris Chikarovski, and they married in 1979. Following a brief career in private practice, she went on to lecture part-time at the College of Law before entering parliament.

== Political career ==
Following the resignation of incumbent John Dowd, Chikarovski won pre-selection for the safe Liberal seat of Lane Cove in 1991, her primary competition for which was then MLC John Hannaford. In 1992, she was appointed Minister for Consumer Affairs and Assistant Minister for Education (3 July 1992 – 26 May 1993). During her time as Minister, Kerry facilitated national agreement to the introduction of a Uniform Credit Code.

In 1993, she became Minister for Industrial Relations and Employment and established the department responsible for the Minister for The Status of Women (29 May 1993 – 4 April 1995). With her dual responsibilities of Industrial Relations and Women, Chikarovski oversaw the development and introduction of flexible working conditions for the public sector and the implementation of mentoring programs to encourage women to seek careers at the highest level of the NSW public service.

Chikarovski replaced Bruce Baird as Deputy Leader of the Liberal Party in December 1994 and held that post until the Liberal Party was defeated in 1995.

=== Leader of the Opposition ===
On 8 December 1998, she replaced Peter Collins as leader, and also held the position of Shadow Minister for the Arts, Ethnic Affairs and Women.

Chikarovski lost the 1999 state election to the incumbent Labor government led by Premier Bob Carr in a landslide. In 2002, John Brogden, a member of her shadow cabinet, announced a challenge to her leadership. Despite the endorsement of Prime Minister John Howard – himself a Sydney-sider – Chikarovski lost the leadership to Brogden by one vote. Chikarovski retired from parliament at the 2003 election and was succeeded by Anthony Roberts in the seat of Lane Cove.

== Post political career ==
Following her resignation from Parliament in 2003, in 2004 she launched her co-authored autobiography, Chika.

She is a passionate advocate for women in sport and is previous Trustee of the Sydney Cricket and Sports Ground Trust.

Chikarovski was appointed a Member of the Order of Australia for "significant service to the Parliament of New South Wales, and to the community" in the 2021 Queen's Birthday Honours.

=== Directorships ===
Chikarovski also serves as a director on a number of sporting, government and not for profit boards:

- Our Watch
- New South Wales Rugby Union
- Humpty Dumpty Foundation

She is the Chair of Road Safety Education. Chikarovski is an Ambassador of the Australian Indigenous Education Foundation and advisor to the Taronga Group.

New South Wales Legislative Assembly
Preceded by John Dowd	Member for Lane Cove; 1991 – 2003	Succeeded by Anthony Roberts
Political offices
Preceded by Peter Collins	Minister for Consumer Affairs; 1992 – 1993	Succeeded by Wendy Machin
Vacant Title last held by Bob Debus	Assistant Minister for Education; 1992 – 1993	Vacant Title next held by Victor Dominello
Preceded by John Fahey as Minister for Further Education, Training and Employment	Minister for Employment and Training; 1992 – 1993	Succeeded by Herself as Minister for Industrial Relations and Employment
Preceded by John Hannaford as Minister for Industrial Relations	Minister for Industrial Relations and Employment; 1993 – 1995	Succeeded by Jeff Shaw as Minister for Industrial Relations
Preceded by Herself as Minister for Employment and Training	Minister for Industrial Relations and Employment; 1993 – 1995	Succeeded by Jeff Shaw as Minister for Industrial Relations
New title	Minister for the Status of Women; 1993 – 1995	Succeeded by Faye Lo Po' as Minister for Women
Preceded by Peter Collins	Leader of the Opposition of New South Wales; 1999 – 2002	Succeeded by John Brogden
Party political offices
Preceded by Peter Collins	Leader of the Liberal Party of Australia (NSW Division); 1999 – 2002	Succeeded by John Brogden
