= May 1930 Monegasque general election =

General election were held in Monaco on 11 June 1930 to elect the 12 members of the National Council. The national councilmen were elected by a 30-member Electoral College.

== Electoral College ==
The 30-member Electoral College consisted of nine members elected by the Communal Council and 21 members elected by voters. The Electoral College also includes three substitute members elected by the Communal Council and six substitute members elected by voters.

=== Members elected by Communal Council ===
The Communal Council held an election for nine members and three substitute members of the Electoral College on 17 May 1930.

=== Members elected by voters ===
An election of the remaining 21 Electoral College members and six substitute members was held on 18 May 1930.

== National Council ==
Candidates	Votes
Charles Ballerio	30
Louis Ceresole	30
Arthur Crovetto	30
Marcel Médecin	30
Louis Passeron	30
Charles Bernasconi	29
Auguste Blot	29
Etienne Crovetto	29
Pierre Jioffredy	29
Eugène Marquet	29
Henri Settimo	29
Pierre Vatrican	29
Source: Journal de Monaco
