= Henry Woodward (Australian politician) =

Australian politician (1898–1966)

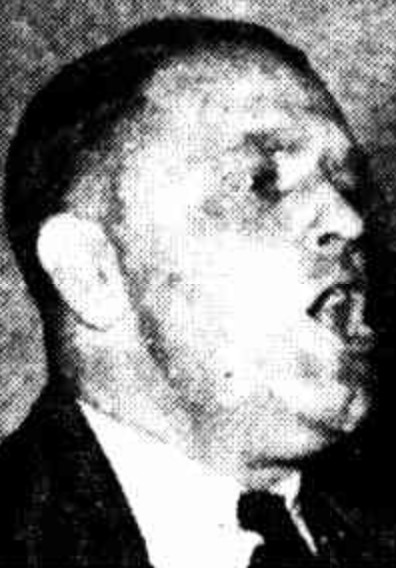
- Woodward in 1946

1st President of the Democratic Party
- In office September−November 1953 – 6 June 1954
- Preceded by: J. A. Garnsey
- Succeeded by: Party dissolved
- In office 22 March 1953 – 8 August 1953
- Preceded by: Office established
- Succeeded by: J. A. Garnsey

Member of the New South Wales Legislative Assembly for Lane Cove
- In office 27 May 1944 – 3 May 1947

Personal details
- Born: 4 April 1898 near Brent Knoll England
- Died: 3 April 1966 (aged 67) Wollstonecraft, New South Wales
- Party: Democratic (from 1953)
- Other political affiliations: Labor (until 1953)

Henry Phipps John Woodward (4 April 1898 – 3 April 1966) was an Australian politician and a member of the New South Wales Legislative Assembly for a single term between 1944 and 1947. He was a member of the Labor Party.

== Early life ==
Woodward was born in Brent Knoll in Somerset, England and was the son of a General dealer (Rag and bone man). He was educated to elementary level in England and initially worked with his father but later became a produce agent and farmer in East Brent. Woodward migrated to Australia in 1922 and was a farm produce agent and company director. He sat in parliament as a member of the Labor Party but joined the Liberal Party after leaving office.

== Political career ==
Woodward entered parliament as the Labor member for Lane Cove after he won the seat at 1944 state election. This was a surprise result as Lane Cove was considered one of the most conservative seats in the assembly. The incumbent Democratic Party member Herbert FitzSimons had retired and his party's new candidate was John Cramer a future Liberal member of the Australian House of Representatives and a cabinet minister under Robert Menzies. The Liberal Democrat candidate was Norman Thomas a former United Australia Party member for the seat of Bondi. Divisions between the two conservative parties resulted in Woodward gaining a 23% leakage of Thomas' second preferences and an 800-vote (2%) victory. The unification of New South Wales' urban conservative politicians in the Liberal Party in 1945, augured the end of Woodward's parliamentary career. He was easily defeated by Liberal candidate Ken McCaw at the 1947 election. Woodward did not hold caucus, parliamentary or ministerial office.

New South Wales Legislative Assembly
Preceded by Herbert FitzSimons	Member for Lane Cove; 1944–1947	Succeeded by Ken McCaw
