= 1930 Haitian parliamentary election =

Parliamentary elections were held in Haiti on 14 October 1930. The elections were authorized by the United States, which wished to pull out of Haiti after a lengthy occupation, and resulted in a majority for nationalist forces. Over fifty candidates ran for President, however, the newly elected National Assembly elected Sténio Vincent as president on 18 November.

Prior to the elections, there were concerns that the American government would choose not to let the elections be free and fair, with The New Republic noting that "there is widespread belief that some of the American officials would welcome violence in the elections, as tending to prove that the reforms promised in the Forbes report are impossible and that the occupation by United States Marines ought to continue indefinitely."
