= Charles H. Tuttle =

American activist, lawyer and politician (1879–1971)

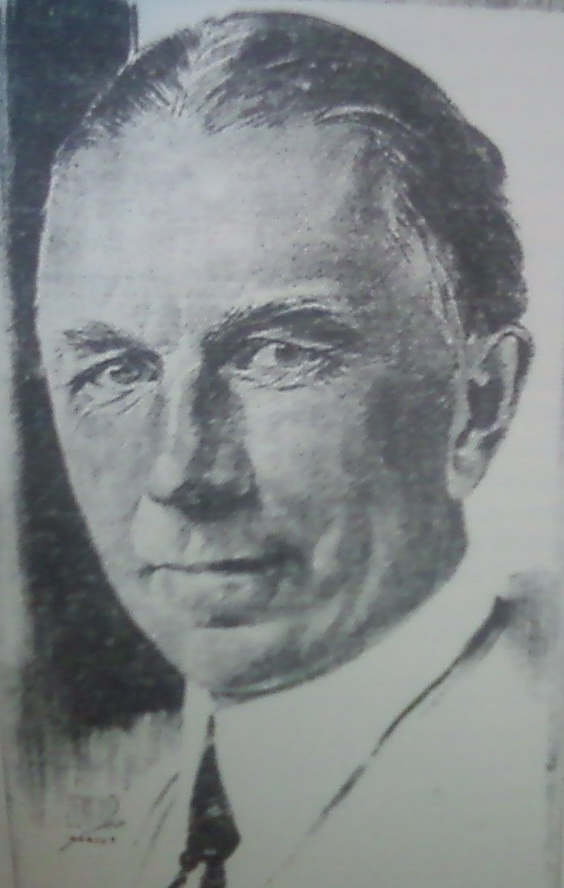
- Tuttle as U.S. Attorney shortly before resigning to run for Governor of New York in 1930.

United States Attorney for the Southern District of New York
- In office April 6, 1927 – September 29, 1930
- Appointed by: Calvin Coolidge
- Preceded by: Emory Buckner
- Succeeded by: Robert E. Manley (Acting)

Personal details
- Born: April 21, 1879 New York City, New York, U.S.
- Died: January 26, 1971 (aged 91) New York City, New York, U.S.
- Resting place: Evergreen Cemetery, Lake George, New York
- Party: Republican
- Spouse: Helene L. Wheeler (m. 1907)
- Children: 4
- Education: Columbia University; Columbia Law School

Charles Henry Tuttle (April 21, 1879 – January 26, 1971) was an American lawyer, politician and civic activist. He was the 1930 Republican nominee for Governor of New York in the election against Franklin D. Roosevelt.

== Early life and education ==
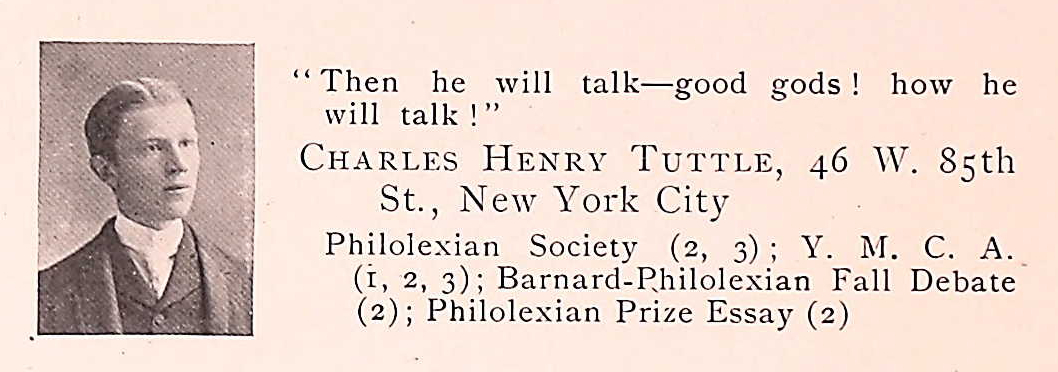
Tuttle in the Columbia University yearbook, 1899

Born in New York City on April 21, 1879, he was raised by his mother and his grandfather Isaac H. Tuttle following the death of his father H. Croswell Tuttle.

Tuttle received a bachelor's degree from Columbia University in 1899 where he was a member of the Philolexian Society. He received his law degree from Columbia Law School in 1902, passed the bar and became an attorney.

== Start of career ==
From 1902 to 1927 Tuttle was a lawyer with the New York City firm of Davies, Stone and Auerbach. He also became active in the New York City Republican party.

== Service as U.S. Attorney ==
In 1927, President Calvin Coolidge appointed Tuttle as United States Attorney for the Southern District of New York.

During his three years as a prosecutor Tuttle earned a reputation as an anticorruption crusader, winning convictions of numerous public officials, including federal Judge Francis A. Winslow and Kings County Judge W. Bernard Vause. During Tuttle's investigation into Tammany Hall's connection to organized crime and corruption, he discovered that Vause was paid $190,000 in return for obtaining pier leases for a shipping company.

In another Tuttle case, Judge Albert Vitale was accused of owing $19,600 to gangster Arnold Rothstein, and was investigated by the Appellate Division of the Supreme Court for failing to explain how he accrued $165,000 over four years while receiving a total judicial salary of $48,000 during that same period. Vitale was removed from the bench and George Ewald, who succeeded him, was accused of paying Tammany Hall $10,000 in order to obtain the seat.

In 1927 Tuttle led an investigation into price gouging by Broadway ticket agencies.

During his term as U.S. Attorney Tuttle also successfully prosecuted several crooked bail bondsmen.

Tuttle also successfully prosecuted the Moscahlades and Dachis Brothers arson rings, organizations responsible for several for profit fires in New York City.

In 1928 the British cruise ship Vestris sank and 111 passengers and crew were killed, including American tourists. Tuttle investigated, and his work led to major reforms in international maritime safety.

In 1930 Tuttle sent Albany's Democratic political boss Daniel P. O'Connell to jail in New York City for contempt of court. Tuttle was investigating illegal activities in Albany, including gambling, and O'Connell refused to answer his questions.

== 1930 campaign for New York Governor ==
Tuttle's high profile as U.S. Attorney made him a likely candidate for political office, and on September 17, 1930, he resigned as U.S. Attorney in anticipation of running for governor. He won the Republican nomination at the state party's September 26 convention.

Although he described himself personally as "dry" on the issue of Prohibition (in favor of keeping alcohol production and consumption illegal), Tuttle favored repeal of the Eighteenth Amendment and argued that individual states, not the federal government, should be free to regulate alcohol as they saw fit. He hoped to campaign on an anticorruption platform, but his opposition to federal prohibition drew fierce criticism from rural Drys. Deciding that he was not sufficiently in favor of Prohibition, the Drys fielded a third-party candidate.

While the Drys argued that Tuttle was too weak on prohibition, New York Democrats argued that Tuttle was a Wet because he favored repeal of the Eighteenth Amendment. During the campaign, Democrats mocked the Republican ticket of Tuttle (an alleged Wet) and lieutenant governor nominee Caleb Baumes (a prominent Dry who supported the Eighteenth Amendment) as asking for votes by trying to please all sides on the Prohibition issue.

On November 4 Tuttle lost to Roosevelt by what was then the largest plurality in New York State history. Roosevelt's victory was attributed to Tuttle's position on Prohibition, as well as the hard economic times of the Great Depression, for which voters blamed Republicans. As a result of his landslide, Roosevelt became the frontrunner for the presidency in 1932.

== Later career and civic activism ==
After losing the race for governor, Tuttle returned to practicing law as senior partner in the firm of Breed, Abbott & Morgan. He also served on the Metropolitan Rapid Transit Commission and maintained an active role in the Republican party.

Tuttle was also active in numerous charities and civic causes. From 1913 to 1966 he was a member of the City College of New York board of trustees. He chaired his local Selective Service Board during both World War I and World War II. An advocate of racial integration, Tuttle helped draft New York State's law against discriminatory hiring. Active in the Episcopal church, he worked to advance tolerance and ecumenical unity with Catholic and Jewish leaders as a leader of the Greater New York Federation of Churches.

In 1945 Tuttle received the Grand Cross of the Order of the Holy Sepulchre from the Greek Orthodox Patriarch of Jerusalem. Through the 1940s, Tuttle was one of only four Americans to have received the award, with the other three being Presidents Warren G. Harding, Franklin D. Roosevelt, and Harry S. Truman.

== Retirement and death ==
After retiring from practicing law, Tuttle was counsel emeritus at Breed, Abbott & Morgan. He also maintained a summer home in Lake George and served for many years as counsel for the Lake George Association. Tuttle died in New York City on January 26, 1971, and was buried at Evergreen Cemetery in Lake George, New York.

== Personal ==
In 1907 Tuttle married Helene L. Wheeler of Oswego, New York. Mrs. Tuttle was born on November 12, 1881, and died on October 6, 1968. They had four children, son H. Croswell Tuttle, and three daughters, Evelyn, Charlotte and Helene Jasmine.

== See also ==
- List of Columbia Law School alumni
- List of people from New York City

Party political offices
Preceded by Albert Ottinger	Republican nominee for Governor of New York; 1930	Succeeded by William J. Donovan
