= 1930 United States elections =

- ← 1928 1929 1930 1931 1932 → Midterm elections
- Election day: November 4
- Incumbent president: ▌Herbert Hoover (R)
- Next Congress: 72nd

Senate elections
- Overall control: Republican hold
- Seats contested: 35 of 96 seats (32 Class 2 seats + 7 special elections)
- Net seat change: Democratic +8
- 1930 Senate election results Democratic gain Democratic hold Republican gain Republican hold

House elections
- Overall control: Democratic gain
- Seats contested: All 435 voting seats
- Popular vote margin: Republican +8.5%
- Net seat change: Democratic +52
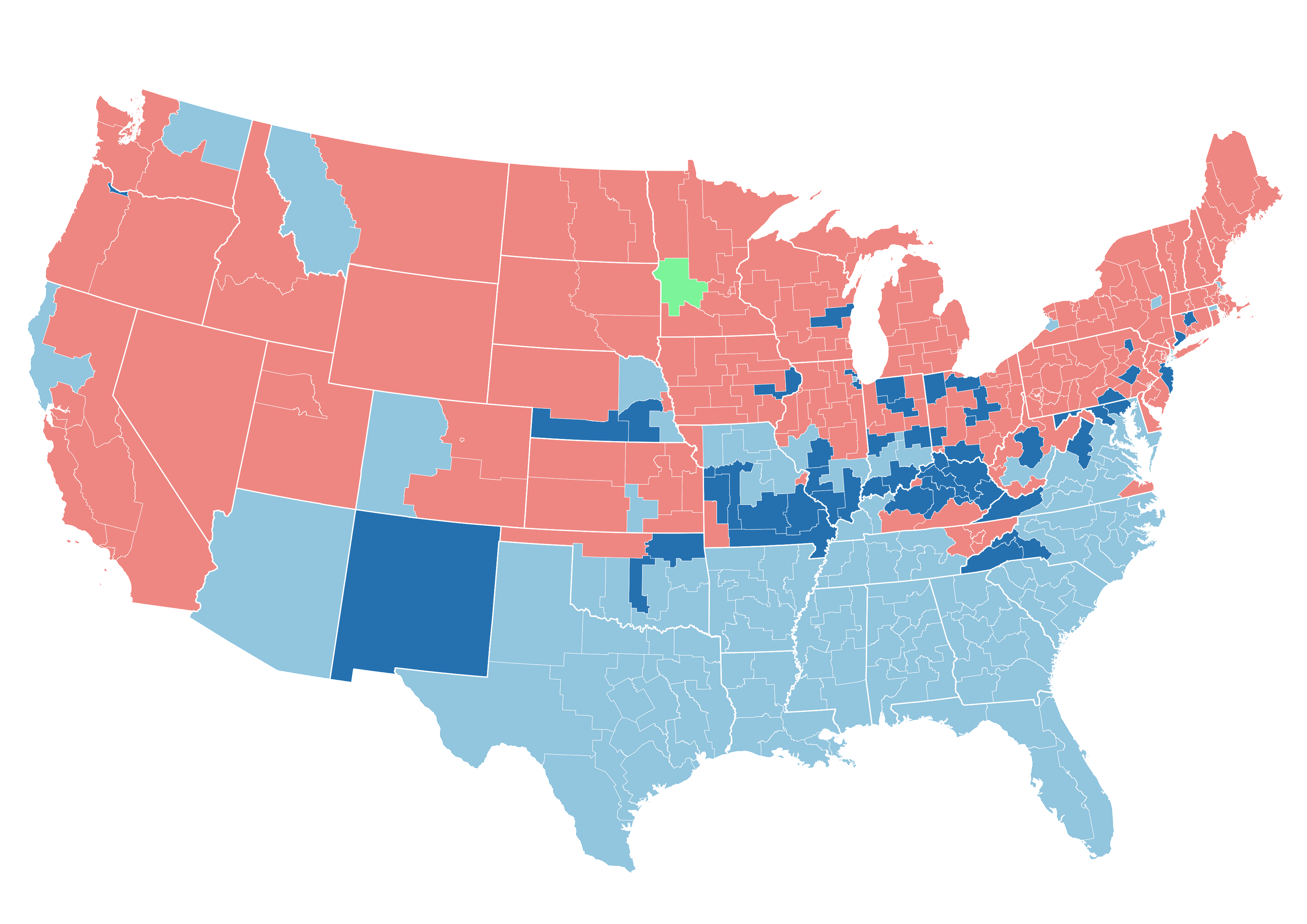

Gubernatorial elections
- Seats contested: 33
- Net seat change: Democratic +7
- 1930 gubernatorial election results Democratic gain Democratic hold Republican gain Republican hold Farmer-Labor gain Independent gain

Elections were held on November 4, 1930, in the middle of Republican President Herbert Hoover's term. Taking place shortly after the start of the Great Depression, the Republican Party suffered substantial losses.

The Republicans lost fifty-two seats to the Democratic Party in the House of Representatives. While the Republicans maintained a one-seat majority after the polls closed, they lost a number of special elections (since some Republican members died) before the start of the new Congress. This allowed the Democrats to take control of the chamber.

The Republicans also lost eight seats to the Democrats in the U.S. Senate, but were able to narrowly maintain control.

The election was a victory for progressives of both parties, as Republicans closely aligned with Hoover lost several Congressional elections. The 72nd United States Congress passed some significant pieces of legislation that were signed by President Hoover. Additionally, New York Governor Franklin D. Roosevelt's landslide re-election established him as the front-runner for the 1932 Democratic nomination.

== See also ==
- 1930 United States House of Representatives elections
- 1930 United States Senate elections
- 1930 United States gubernatorial elections
