= April 1930 Monegasque general election =

General elections were to be held in Monaco on 4 May 1930 to elect the 12 members of the National Council. The election was annulled by Prince Louis II because it did not reach the quorum required by the Constitution.

== Electoral College ==
The National Council was elected by a 30-member Electoral College. The Electoral College consisted of nine members elected by the Communal Council and 21 members elected by voters. The Electoral College also includes three substitute members elected by the Communal Council and six substitute members elected by voters.

=== Members elected by Communal Council ===
The Communal Council held an election for nine members and three substitute members of the Electoral College on 12 April 1930.

	Candidates	Votes
Members	Eugène Marquet	14
Members	Pierre Jioffredy	14
Members	Etienne Crovetto	14
Members	Pierre Vatrican	14
Members	Charles Bernasconi	14
Members	Honoré Bellando	14
Members	Louis Rapaire	14
Members	Joseph Marquet	14
Members	Edouard Giordano	14
Substitute members	Arthur Linetti	14
Substitute members	Jérôme Auréglia	14
Substitute members	Louis Settimo	14
Source: Journal de Monaco

=== Members elected by voters ===
An election of the remaining 21 Electoral College members and six substitute members was held on 13 April 1930.

	Candidates	Votes
Members	Robert Boisson	422
Members	Antoine Médecin	420
Members	Henri Settimo	419
Members	Louis Ceresole	415
Members	Théophile Gastaud	415
Members	Louis Briano	412
Members	Victor Rigazzi	408
Members	Antoine Icardi	407
Members	Auguste Boin	406
Members	François Fissore	404
Members	Emmanuel Nègre	400
Members	Jean Berti	399
Members	Emmanuel Rué	398
Members	Constant Auréglia	396
Members	Auguste Canis	387
Members	Jean Vatrican	387
Members	Henri Médecin	383
Members	Jules Cerutti	382
Members	Auguste Blot	380
Members	Laurent Campana	379
Members	Georges Sangiorgio	369
Substitute members	Henri Castellini	417
Substitute members	Louis Thibaud	417
Substitute members	Jean Elena	386
Substitute members	Amédée Bellando	385
Substitute members	François Riva	382
Substitute members	Laurent Jioffredy	379
Valid ballots		438
Invalid ballots		21
Total ballots		459
Source: Journal de Monaco
