= 1930 Nicaraguan parliamentary election =

Parliamentary elections were held in Nicaragua on 2 November 1930 to elect half of the seats in the Chamber of Deputies and one-third of the seats in the Senate of the National Congress.

"The 1930 congressional elections, also supervised by U.S. Marines, produced a Liberal majority."

"The seats of 1/3 of the Senators and of 1/2 of the Deputies were to be filled in the congressional elections of 1930. The two major parties, Liberal and Conservative, were the only contestants, as the Liberal Republican Party did not qualify under the terms of the electoral law. The elections, which were held on 2 November 1930, resulted in the election of 7 Liberal Senators and 16 Deputies and 2 Conservative Senators and 6 Deputies. The total vote cast was approximately 70 percent of that in the same districts in 1928."

== Results ==
Party	Seats			
Party	Chamber won	Chamber total	Senate won	Senate total
Liberal Party	16	29	7	16
Conservative Party	6	14	2	8
Total	22	43	9	24
Source: Political Handbook of the World

== Bibliography ==
- Bulmer-Thomas, Victor. “ Nicaragua since 1930.” Central America since independence. 1991. Cambridge: Cambridge University Press.
- Dodd, Thomas J. Managing democracy in Central America (A case study: United States election supervision in Nicaragua, 1927–1933). New Brunswick: Transaction Publishers. 1992.
- Elections in the Americas A Data Handbook Volume 1. North America, Central America, and the Caribbean. Edited by Dieter Nohlen. 2005.
- Kamman, William. 1968. A search for stability: United States diplomacy toward Nicaragua 1925-1933. Notre Dame: University of Notre Dame Press.
- Political handbook of the world 1932. New York, 1933.
- Ramírez, Sergio. El muchacho de Niquinohomo. Managua: Editorial Vanguardia. Includes “Cronología 1890-1934”. 1988.
- Ramírez, Sergio. “The kid from Niquinohomo.” Latin American perspectives 16, 3:48-82 (summer 1989). English translation of El muchacho de Niquinohomo without the “Cronología.”
- United States Department of State. The United States and Nicaragua: a survey of the relations from 1909 to 1932. Washington, D.C.: Government Printing Office. 1932.
