= Electoral district of Lane Cove =

Lane Cove New South Wales—Legislative Assembly
- Interactive map of district boundaries from the 2023 state election
- State: New South Wales
- Dates current: 1904–1913, 1927–present
- MP: Anthony Roberts
- Party: Liberal Party
- Namesake: Lane Cove
- Electors: 58,580 (2023)
- Area: 36.56 km^{2} (14.1 sq mi)
- Demographic: Inner-metropolitan
Electorates around Lane Cove:
Ryde	Wahroonga	Davidson
Ryde	Lane Cove	Willoughby
Drummoyne	Drummoyne; Balmain	North Shore

Lane Cove is an electoral district of the Legislative Assembly in the Australian state of New South Wales. It is represented by Anthony Roberts of the Liberal Party.

== Geography ==
On its current boundaries, Lane Cove encompasses the suburbs and localities of Artarmon, Chatswood West, East Ryde, Gladesville, Gore Hill, Greenwich, Henley, Hunters Hill, Huntleys Point, Lane Cove, Linley Point, Longueville, Macquarie Park, Monash Park, North Ryde, Northwood, Putney, Riverview, Ryde, St Leonards, Tambourine Bay and Woolwich.

== Members for Lane Cove ==
First incarnation (1904–1913)
Member	Party	Term
David Fell	Liberal Reform	1904–1913
Second incarnation (1927–present)
Member	Party	Term
Bryce Walmsley	Nationalist	1927–1930
Herbert FitzSimons	Nationalist	1930–1932
Herbert FitzSimons	United Australia	1932–1944
Henry Woodward	Labor	1944–1947
Ken McCaw	Liberal	1947–1975
John Dowd	Liberal	1975–1991
Kerry Chikarovski	Liberal	1991–2003
Anthony Roberts	Liberal	2003–present

== Election results ==
2023 New South Wales state election: Lane Cove
Party	Candidate	Votes	%	±%
Liberal	Anthony Roberts	23,463	45.1	−7.2
Labor	Penelope Pedersen	12,469	24.0	+3.8
Independent	Victoria Davidson	10,608	20.4	+20.4
Greens	Heather Armstrong	4,331	8.3	−2.1
Sustainable Australia	Ben Wise	1,189	2.3	+0.3
Total formal votes		52,060	98.1	+0.1
Informal votes		1,026	1.9	−0.1
Turnout		53,086	90.6	+1.6
Two-party-preferred result
Liberal	Anthony Roberts	26,245	55.5	−9.2
Labor	Penelope Pedersen	21,047	44.5	+9.2
Liberal hold		Swing	−9.2	
