= 29 December 1930 Guatemalan presidential election =

Guatemalan presidential election, 29 December 1930
← 1926	29 December 1930	1931 →
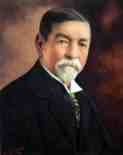
Nominee	José María Reina Andrade
Party	Liberal
Percentage	100%
Head of State before election
Manuel María Orellana Contreras
Liberal
Elected Head of State
José María Reina Andrade
Liberal

A presidential election was held in Guatemala on 29 December 1930.

The Congress to elect the provisional president of the Speaker of the Congress José María Reina Andrade (Liberal Party). Assumed office 2 January 1931
