= List of mayors of Lane Cove =

Mayor of Lane Cove Council
- Incumbent; Merri Southwood since October 2024
- Style: His/Her Worship
- Appointer: Lane Cove Council
- Term length: One year (1895–2016) Two years (2017–date)
- Formation: 4 April 1895
- First holder: Jeremiah Roberts
- Deputy: Bridget Kennedy
- Website: https://www.lanecove.nsw.gov.au/

This is a list of mayors of the Council of the Municipality of Lane Cove, a local government area in the north shore region of Sydney, New South Wales, Australia. The council was first incorporated on 11 February 1895. From inception until 2017, the mayor was elected annually by the elected councillors. Since 2017, the Mayor is elected for a two-year term, with the deputy mayor for one year, by the councillors at the first meeting of the council. The mayor of Lane Cove Council since 21 September 2023 is Councillor Scott Bennison, a councillor from the Liberal Party of Australia. The mayor is assisted in their work by a Deputy Mayor, who is elected on an annual basis by the elected councillors.

== Mayors ==
The following individuals have served as Mayor of the Council of the Municipality of Lane Cove:

#	Mayor	Party	Term start	Term end	Time in office	Notes
1	Jeremiah Roberts	Independent	4 April 1895	8 February 1897	1 year, 310 days	
2	James Robb	Independent	8 February 1897	4 February 1898	361 days	
3	Henry Charles Catt	Independent	4 February 1898	15 February 1900	2 years, 11 days	
4	Charles Ludowici	Independent	15 February 1900	9 February 1901	359 days	
–	Henry Charles Catt	Independent	9 February 1901	11 February 1904	3 years, 2 days	
5	Cyril Blacket	Independent	11 February 1904	20 February 1906	2 years, 9 days	
6	Joseph Burdekin Holdsworth	Independent	20 February 1906	February 1910	3 years, 346 days	
7	Walter Thomas	Independent	February 1910	February 1912		
–	Joseph Burdekin Holdsworth	Independent	February 1912	February 1914		
8	James Tomlin	Independent	February 1914	February 1918		
9	John Lloyd Jones	Independent	February 1918	February 1920		
10	Angus James Fraser	Independent	February 1920	9 July 1923		
11	Archibald Johnston	Independent	12 July 1923	10 December 1923	151 days	
12	Thomas John Howell	Independent	10 December 1923	15 December 1924	1 year, 5 days	
13	Vincent Aloysius Carroll	Independent	15 December 1924	December 1925		
–	Angus James Fraser	Independent	December 1925	December 1926		
14	Frederick William Dunn	Independent	December 1926	December 1929		
15	William Malachy Brady	Independent	December 1929	December 1930		
16	Frederick William Dunn	Independent	December 1930	December 1931		
17	Charles Robert Conrad Scharkie	Independent	December 1931	December 1932		
18	Fred Graham	Independent	December 1932	December 1933		
19	John Marsh	Independent	December 1933	December 1938		
–	Archibald Johnston	Independent	December 1938	December 1943		
20	George Polson Holloway	Independent	December 1943	December 1946		
21	James Ernest Clancy Rawson	Independent	December 1946	December 1948		
22	John Hargraves Hodgson	Independent	December 1948	December 1950		
23	John Harold Blackman	Independent	December 1950	December 1952		
24	George Oliver Venteman	Independent	December 1952	December 1954		
25	George Batten	Independent	December 1954	December 1956		
26	Albert Edward Shaw	Independent	December 1956	December 1958		
27	Arthur Eddington Langford Griffith	Independent	December 1958	December 1961		
28	Russell Brickhill	Independent	December 1961	December 1963		
29	Marjorie Propsting	Independent	December 1963	December 1965		
30	Sydney Jack Friedlander	Independent	December 1965	December 1967		
31	Archibald William Mackinnon	Independent	December 1967	December 1968		
32	Andrew White Aitchison	Independent	December 1968	December 1970		
33	Richard Harwin Nossiter DSC OAM	Independent	December 1970	September 1973		
34	Rex Lemaire	Independent	September 1973	September 1975		
35	William Albert Fleming	Independent	September 1975	September 1977		
36	Bill Henningham PSM	Independent	September 1977	September 1981		
37	Rosilyn Ivy Baxter OAM	Independent	September 1981	September 1984		
38	John McGirr	Independent	September 1984	September 1987		
–	Sydney Jack Friedlander OAM	Independent	September 1987	September 1991		
39	James Douglas Welsh	Independent	September 1991	September 1993		
40	Barry John Harrison	Independent	September 1993	September 1994		
41	Rod Tudge	Independent	September 1994	September 1996		
42	Mary Rawlings	Independent	September 1996	September 1998		
43	Fran Tierney	Independent	September 1998	September 1999		
44	Anthony Roberts	Independent	September 1999	September 2000		
45	Stephen Bowers	Independent	September 2000	September 2001		
–	Anthony Roberts	Independent	September 2001	September 2002		
46	John May	Independent	September 2002	March 2004		
47	Ian Longbottom	Independent	March 2004	21 September 2009		
48	Win Gaffney	Liberal	21 September 2009	September 2012	2 years, 365 days	
49	Scott Bennison	Liberal	September 2012	17 September 2013	362 days	
50	David Brooks-Horn	Liberal	17 September 2013	21 September 2015	2 years, 4 days	
51	Deborah Hutchens	Liberal	21 September 2015	25 September 2017	2 years, 4 days	
52	Pam Palmer	Independent	25 September 2017	10 January 2022	4 years, 107 days	
53	Andrew Zbik	Labor	10 January 2022	21 September 2023	1 year, 254 days	
–	Scott Bennison	One Nation	21 September 2023	October 2024	3 years, 62 days	

== See also ==
- Local government areas of New South Wales
