= 1930 Georgia gubernatorial election =

1930 Georgia Democratic gubernatorial primary runoff
- October 1, 1930

410 county unit votes 206 unit votes needed to win
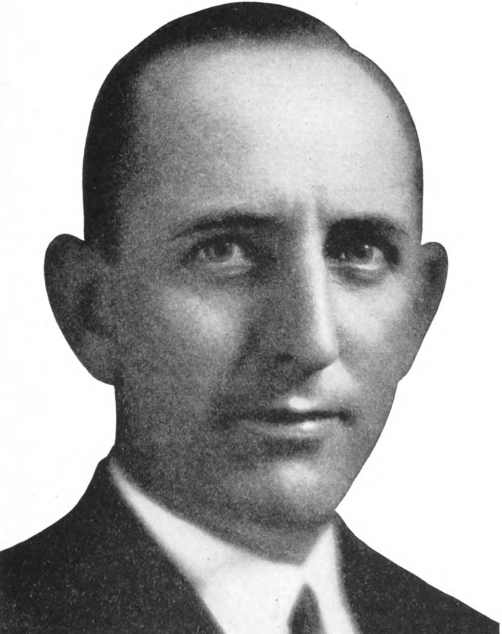

| Nominee | Richard Russell Jr. | George H. Carswell |
| Party | Democratic | Democratic |
| Electoral vote | 330 | 84 |
| Popular vote | 99,505 | 47,157 |
| Percentage | 67.85% | 32.15% |
- County results Russell: 40–50% 50–60% 60–70% 70–80% 80–90% >90% Carswell: 50–60% 60–70% 70–80% 80–90%
Governor before election
Lamartine Griffin Hardman
Democratic
Elected Governor
Richard Russell Jr.
Democratic

The 1930 Georgia gubernatorial election took place on November 4, 1930, in order to elect the governor of Georgia.

Incumbent Democratic governor Lamartine Griffin Hardman was term-limited, and ineligible to run for a third term.

As was common at the time, the Democratic candidate ran unopposed in the general election so therefore the Democratic primary was the real contest, and winning the primary was considered tantamount to election.

== Democratic primary ==
The Democratic primary election was held on September 9, 1930. As no candidate won a majority of county unit votes, a run-off was held between the top two candidates on October 1, 1930.

=== County unit system ===
From 1917 until 1962, the Democratic Party in the U.S. state of Georgia used a voting system called the county unit system to determine victors in statewide primary elections.

The system was ostensibly designed to function similarly to the Electoral College, but in practice the large ratio of unit votes for small, rural counties to unit votes for more populous urban areas provided outsized political influence to the smaller counties.

Under the county unit system, the 159 counties in Georgia were divided by population into three categories. The largest eight counties were classified as "Urban", the next-largest 30 counties were classified as "Town", and the remaining 121 counties were classified as "Rural". Urban counties were given 6 unit votes, Town counties were given 4 unit votes, and Rural counties were given 2 unit votes, for a total of 410 available unit votes. Each county's unit votes were awarded on a winner-take-all basis.

Candidates were required to obtain a majority of unit votes (not necessarily a majority of the popular vote), or 206 total unit votes, to win the election. If no candidate received a majority in the initial primary, a runoff election was held between the top two candidates to determine a winner.

=== Candidates ===
- George H. Carswell, incumbent Secretary of State of Georgia
- John N. Holder, former chairman of the State Highway Commission
- James A. Perry, chairman of the Georgia Public Service Commission
- Eurith D. Rivers, former state senator and unsuccessful candidate for Democratic nomination in the 1928 Georgia gubernatorial election
- Richard Russell Jr., Speaker of the Georgia House of Representatives

=== Results ===
Democratic primary
| Candidate | Popular vote | | County unit vote | |
| Candidate | Votes | % | Votes | % |
|---|---|---|---|---|
| Richard Russell Jr. | 56,177 | 27.26 | 132 | 31.88 |
| George H. Carswell | 51,851 | 25.16 | 126 | 30.43 |
| Eurith D. Rivers | 47,121 | 22.87 | 88 | 21.26 |
| John N. Holder | 44,318 | 21.51 | 68 | 16.43 |
| James A. Perry | 6,594 | 3.20 | | |
| Total | 206,061 | 100.00 | 414 | 100.00 |

Democratic primary runoff
| Candidate | Popular vote | | County unit vote | |
| Candidate | Votes | % | Votes | % |
|---|---|---|---|---|
| Richard Russell Jr. | 99,505 | 67.85 | 330 | 79.71 |
| George H. Carswell | 47,157 | 32.15 | 84 | 20.29 |
| Total | 146,662 | 100.00 | 414 | 100.00 |

== General election ==
In the general election, Russell ran unopposed.

=== Results ===
1930 Georgia gubernatorial election
| Party | Candidate | Votes | % | ±% |
|---|---|---|---|---|
| Democratic | Richard Russell Jr. | 56,462 | 100.00% | |
| Turnout | | 56,462 | 100.00% | |
| Democratic hold | | Swing | | |

== Bibliography ==
- Gubernatorial Elections, 1787-1997. Washington, D.C.: Congressional Quarterly Inc. 1998. ISBN 1-56802-396-0.
- Glashan, Roy R. (1979). American Governors and Gubernatorial Elections, 1775-1978. Meckler Books. ISBN 0-930466-17-9.
- Dubin, Michael J. (2013). "Annual Summary". United States Gubernatorial Elections, 1912-1931: The Official Results by State and County. Jefferson, NC: McFarland & Company, Inc. ISBN 9781476601007.
- Compiled by Ruth Blair, State Historian and Director (1931). Georgia's Official Register, 1931 (PDF). Atlanta, GA: State of Georgia, Department of Archives and History.
