= Herbert FitzSimons =

Australian politician

Major Herbert Paton FitzSimons (25 November 1898 – 31 January 1970) was an Australian politician.

He was born at Gordon in Sydney; his father, William FitzSimons, was a member of the New South Wales Parliament from 1922 to 1926. Herbert was educated at Abbotsholme College before studying at the University of Sydney from 1919 to 1921 (he had joined the Australian Imperial Force and was sent to New Guinea, but the war ended before he saw action). He later worked with the importers' company Boswell and Co. until 1925, and then worked for Pratten Brothers (a printing company) until 1935. He married Eleanor Brown on 2 April 1927, with whom he had two children.

In 1930, FitzSimons was elected to the New South Wales Legislative Assembly as the Nationalist member for Lane Cove. He was an honorary minister from 1933 to 1935 and served as Minister for Health from 1939 to 1941. During World War II, he was attached to the Army Medical Directorate and then the United States Army Headquarters in Australia; he then served as Registrar of Australian General Hospital from 1942 to 1943 and at Port Moresby from 1943 to 1944. He retired from the Legislative Assembly in 1944 and became assistant registrar at Concord Military Hospital until 1947. From 1944 to 1955 he was an alderman on Ku-ring-gai Council, and he managed Leslie and Stead, a printing company, for that period.

In 1955 he was elected to the New South Wales Legislative Council as a Liberal member. He defected to the Country Party on 29 September 1959 and was appointed Government Whip in 1967. FitzSimons served in the council until his death at Wamberal in 1970.

New South Wales Legislative Assembly
| Preceded by Bryce Walmsley | Member for Lane Cove; 1930–1944 | Succeeded by Henry Woodward |
