= Bryce Walmsley =

Australian politician

Member of the New South Wales Parliament for Lane Cove
- In office 1927 – 21 June 1930
- Preceded by: New seat
- Succeeded by: Herbert FitzSimons

Personal details
- Born: Bryce Crawford Walmsley; 2 August 1881 Port Adelaide, South Australia
- Died: 21 June 1930 (aged 48) Lindfield, New South Wales
- Party: Nationalist
- Spouse: Jessie Elsie Dunn Munro
- Children: 3
- Occupation: Accountant

Bryce Crawford Walmsley (2 August 1881 – 21 June 1930) was an Australian politician.

He was born at Port Adelaide to engineer James Walmsley and Agnes, née Crawford. He grew up in Albury and moved to Sydney in 1902, where he worked with an accounting firm until 1920. On 11 October 1918 he married Jessie Elsie Dunn Munro, with whom he had three children. In 1927 he was elected to the New South Wales Legislative Assembly as the Nationalist member for Lane Cove, serving until his death at Lindfield in 1930.

New South Wales Legislative Assembly
Preceded by New seat	Member for Lane Cove; 1927–1930	Succeeded by Herbert FitzSimons
