= John Dowd (politician) =

Australian politician

The Honourable John Dowd AO KC

Leader of the Opposition of New South Wales
- In office 20 October 1981 – 15 March 1983
- Preceded by: Bruce McDonald
- Succeeded by: Nick Greiner

Member or the New South Wales Legislative Assembly for Lane Cove
- In office 8 February 1975 – 3 May 1991
- Preceded by: Sir Ken McCaw
- Succeeded by: Kerry Chikarovski

Personal details
- Born: 12 November 1940 (age 86)
- Party: Liberal Party

John Robert Arthur Dowd AO KC (born 12 November 1940), is a former leader of the Liberal Party of Australia in New South Wales. He was the Chancellor of Southern Cross University between 2002 and 2014, and the President of ActionAid Australia, an international aid organisation.

== Early years and background ==
Dowd was educated at Fort Street High School and the University of Sydney where he graduated with a LLB. Before entering Parliament, he was admitted to the New South Wales Bar in 1967. Dowd later was admitted to the Bar of Ireland and became a member of the King's Inns in Dublin.

== Political career ==
He was a member of the Liberal Party, and the member for Lane Cove in the New South Wales Legislative Assembly from 1975 to 1991. He served as Opposition Leader from 1981, elected as Leader shortly after that year's election, until 1983 when he was deposed by Nick Greiner.

The 1981 election had seen Dowd's predecessor Bruce McDonald defeated in the seat he was contesting and the Liberals winning the same number of seats as its Coalition partner, the National Country Party. The Liberal Party leader has always been the leader of the coalition due to the Liberal Party always having more seats than its coalition partner. The fact that the Liberal Party had won the same number of seats as the National Country Party meant that the now vacant Opposition leadership came under dispute between the new Liberal leader Dowd and National Country Party leader Leon Punch which ultimately went to Dowd.

During Greiner's first term as Premier of New South Wales, Dowd was appointed Attorney General, serving between 1988 and 1991 and also serving as Leader of the House during the same period.

During his term as Attorney-General, important legal reforms in New South Wales were completed including establishment of the Independent Commission Against Corruption and reforms of the criminal, tort and motor accident laws. ICAC is recognised as being the idea of Dowd, which he imported from Hong Kong.

Retiring from Parliament in 1991, Dowd was succeeded as Member for Lane Cove by future Opposition Leader Kerry Chikarovski. He attempted a move to the federal arena when he sought preselection for the 1994 Warringah by-election following the retirement of Michael Mackellar but lost out to future Prime Minister Tony Abbott.

== Career as a jurist ==
Following his retirement from politics, Dowd was appointed to the Supreme Court of New South Wales in 1994, serving until 2004.

At the time of his resignation from the Supreme Court, Dowd blamed personal attacks from Prime Minister John Howard and Premier of New South Wales Bob Carr regarding his opposition to anti-terrorism legislation for his resignation from the bench. Dowd resigned from the bench on 13 August 2004.

In 2002, Dowd served as Chairman of the International Commission of Jurists (ICJ), having been involved with the Australian chapter of the ICJ since 1974. During his time as international chairman, Dowd was involved in missions including to Hong Kong in 1991, East Timor in 2000 and Nepal in 2003. In 1997, he led the Australian government delegation to monitor Palestinian Legislative Council elections and procedures.

== Community service ==
In 2002, Dowd was elected as the Chancellor of Southern Cross University, serving until his retirement in 2014. In 2005, he was appointed Protection Ambassador for ActionAid Australia (previously called AUSTCARE), and became a Director of the organisation in 2008 and President in 2009. In May 2011, Dowd launched The Justice Campaign in a show of support for human rights and justice with a focus on alleged abuses at Guantanamo Bay, Abu Ghraib and elsewhere, and a particular focus on David Hicks.

He is a member of the Australian Club in Sydney.

New South Wales Legislative Assembly
Preceded by Sir Ken McCaw	Member for Lane Cove; 1975 – 1991	Succeeded by Kerry Chikarovski
Political offices
Preceded by Bruce McDonald	Leader of the Opposition of New South Wales; 1981 – 1983	Succeeded by Nick Greiner
Preceded by Ron Mulock	Attorney-General of New South Wales; 1988 – 1991	Succeeded by Peter Collins
Party political offices
Preceded by Bruce McDonald	Leader of the New South Wales Liberal Party; 1981 – 1983	Succeeded by Nick Greiner
Academic offices
Preceded by Lionel Phelps	Chancellor of Southern Cross University; 2002 – 2014	Succeeded by Nick Burton Taylor
