= 1930 New York gubernatorial election =

- November 4, 1930
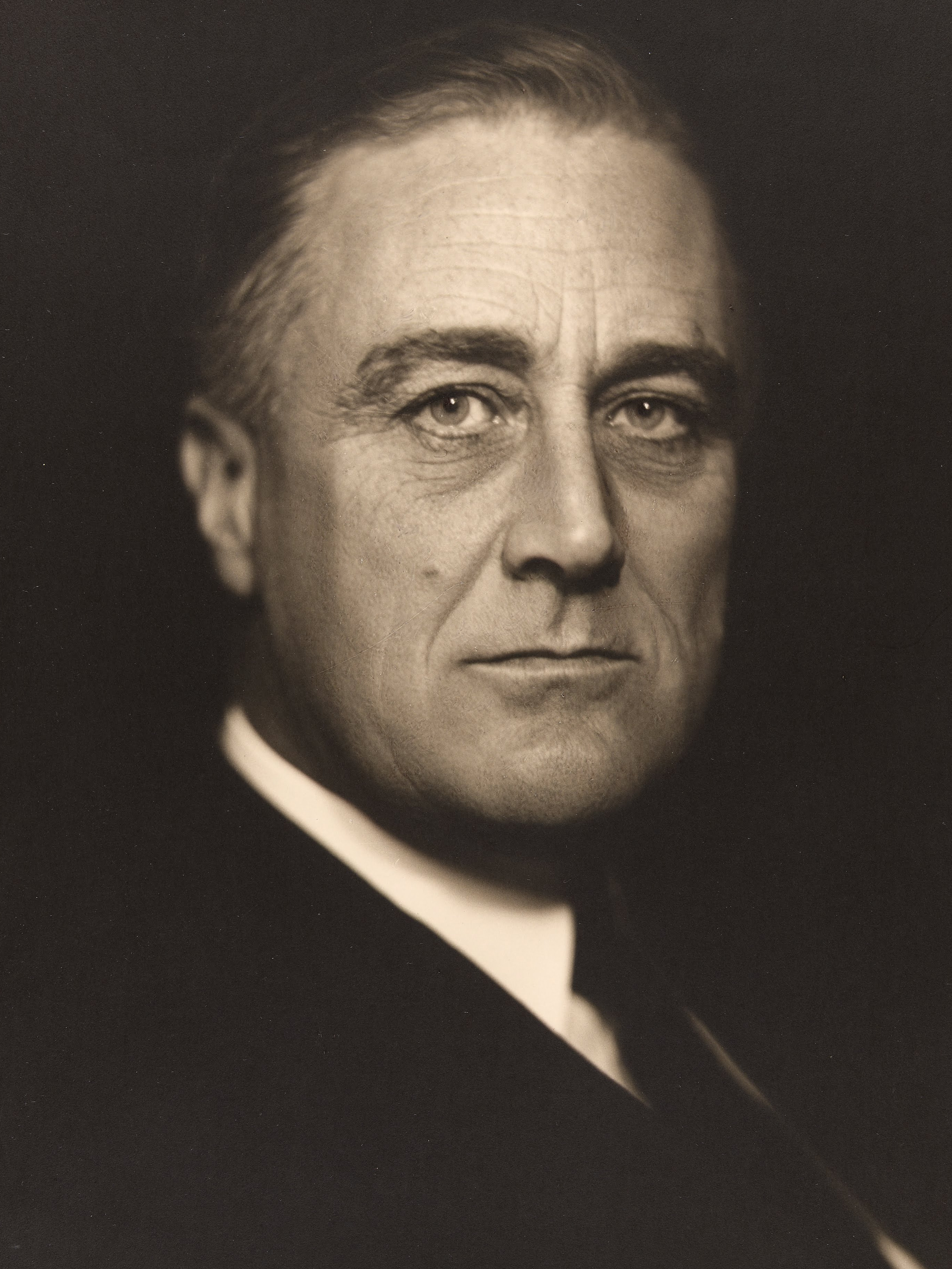

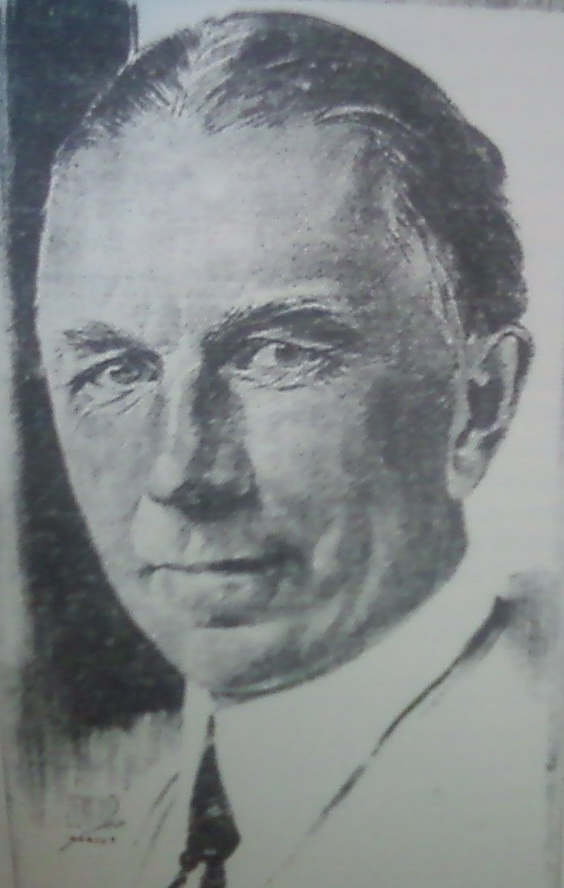

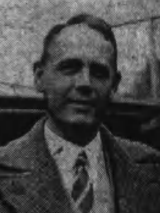
Nominee	Franklin D. Roosevelt	Charles H. Tuttle	Robert P. Carroll
Party	Democratic	Republican	Law Preservation
Popular vote	1,770,342	1,045,341	190,666
Percentage	56.49%	33.36%	6.08%
- County results Roosevelt: 30–40% 40–50% 50–60% 60–70% 70–80% Tuttle: 30–40% 40–50% 50–60% Carroll: 30–40%
Governor before election
Franklin D. Roosevelt
Democratic
Elected Governor
Franklin D. Roosevelt
Democratic

The 1930 New York gubernatorial election was held on November 4, 1930, to elect the Governor of New York. Incumbent Democratic Governor Franklin D. Roosevelt was re-elected to a second term in office in a landslide over the U.S Attorney for the Southern District of New York, Charles H. Tuttle (Who would resign from his position to run in this election).

This would be Roosevelt's final term as governor, as he would be elevated to the presidency after winning in a landslide victory for president in 1932 as the Democratic nominee against incumbent Republican president Herbert Hoover.

As of 2026, this is the last gubernatorial election where Hamilton County voted for the Democratic candidate.

== General election ==
=== Candidates ===
- Charles H. Tuttle, U.S. Attorney for the Southern District of New York (Republican)
- Louis Waldman, (Socialist)
- Franklin D. Roosevelt, Incumbent Governor (Democratic)
- William Z. Foster, (Communist)
- Robert Paris Carroll, (Law Preservation)
- Jeremiah D. Crowley, (Socialist Labor)

=== Results ===
1930 New York gubernatorial election
Party	Candidate	Votes	%	±%
Democratic	Franklin D. Roosevelt	1,770,342	56.49%	
Republican	Charles Tuttle	1,045,341	33.36%	
Law Preservation	Robert Paris Carroll	190,666	6.08%	
Socialist	Louis Waldman	100,444	3.21%	
Communist	William Z Foster	18,034	0.58%	
Socialist Labor	Jeremiah D. Crowley	9,096	0.29%	
Total votes		3,133,923	100.00%	

== See also ==
- 1930 New York state election
- New York gubernatorial elections
