= Ken McCaw =

Australian politician

The Honourable Sir Ken McCaw QC

40th Attorney-General of New South Wales
- In office 23 May 1965 – 3 January 1975
- Premier: Sir Robert Askin
- Preceded by: Reg Downing
- Succeeded by: John Maddison

Member of the New South Wales Parliament for Lane Cove
- In office 3 May 1947 – 3 January 1975
- Preceded by: Henry Woodward
- Succeeded by: John Dowd

Personal details
- Born: Kenneth Malcolm McCaw; 8 October 1907 Chatswood, New South Wales, Australia
- Died: 13 September 1989 (aged 81) Sydney, New South Wales, Australia
- Party: Liberal Party

Sir Kenneth Malcolm McCaw, QC (8 October 1907 – 13 September 1989), an Australian politician, was a member of the New South Wales Legislative Assembly representing Lane Cove for the Liberal Party from 1947 until his retirement from political office in 1975. McCaw served as Attorney General of New South Wales from 1965 to 1975.

== Early years and background ==
McCaw was born in Chatswood, New South Wales. he was the son of a teamster and was educated in country schools. He initially worked as a farm hand but then moved to Sydney, was employed as a clerk and continued to study at night. He was admitted as a solicitor in 1934 and was active in the Law Society of New South Wales and community groups in the Lane Cove district.

== Political career ==
McCaw entered the New South Wales parliament at the 1947 election as the Liberal member for Lane Cove; defeating the sitting Labor member Henry Woodward. He retained the seat at the next nine elections and retired in 1975.

With the election of the coalition government of Robert Askin at the 1965 election, McCaw was appointed Attorney-General. He held this position until his retirement. In 1967 he recommended to Cabinet that women be called for jury service although the 1968 legislation did not commence operation until 1974 and then only in part of NSW.

During his term in office, he was appointed Queen's Counsel, in 1972.

== Career after politics ==
On retirement from politics, McCaw was awarded a Knight Bachelor, which does not carry post-nominal letters.

New South Wales Legislative Assembly
Preceded by Henry Woodward	Member for Lane Cove; 1947 – 1975	Succeeded by John Dowd
Political offices
Preceded by Reg Downing	Attorney General of New South Wales; 1965 – 1975	Succeeded by John Maddison
