= Leaders of the Australian Labor Party =

Highest political office within the party

Leader of the Australian Labor Party
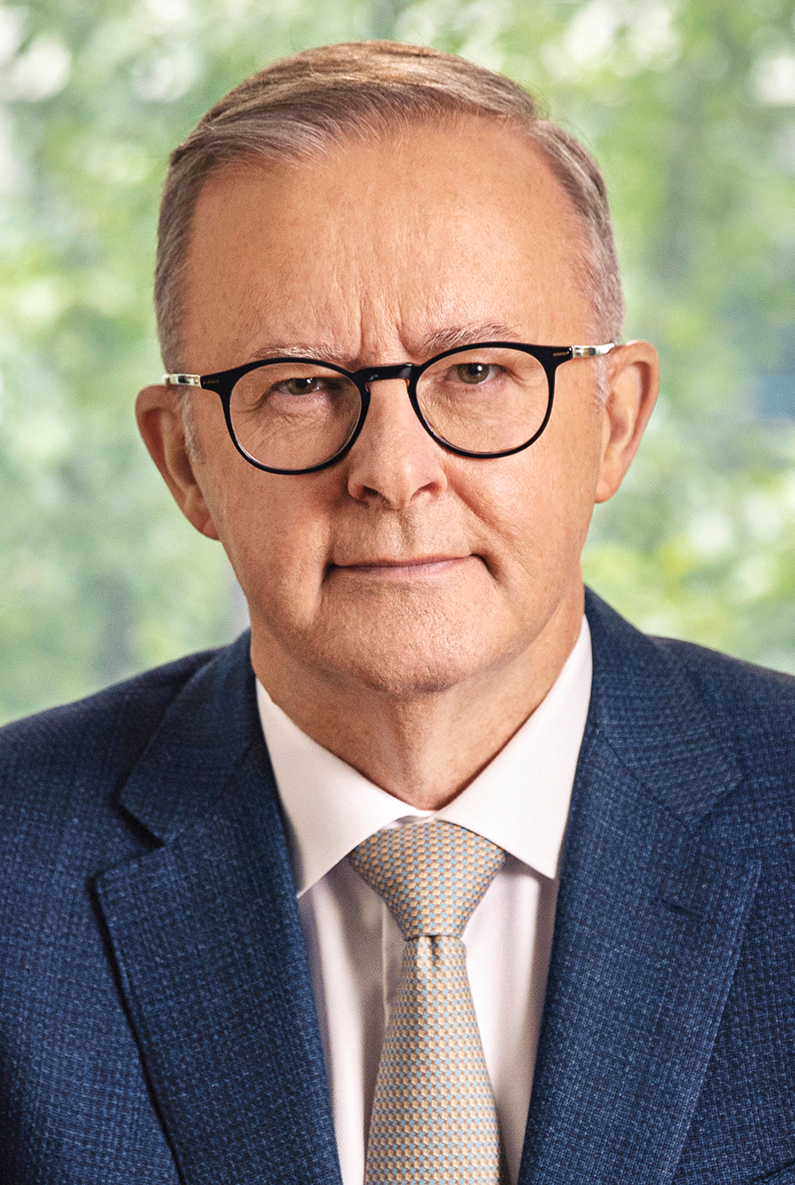
- Incumbent; Anthony Albanese since 30 May 2019
- Member of: ALP National Executive; ALP Caucus
- Term length: No fixed term
- Inaugural holder: Chris Watson
- Formation: 20 May 1901; 125 years ago
- Deputy: Richard Marles
- Website: Anthony Albanese, Leader of the Australian Labor Party

The leader of the Australian Labor Party is the highest political office within the federal Australian Labor Party (ALP). Leaders of the party are chosen from among the sitting members of the parliamentary caucus either by members alone or with a vote of the party's rank-and-file membership. The current leader of the Labor Party, since 2019, is Anthony Albanese, who has served as the prime minister of Australia since 2022. There have been 21 leaders since 1901 when Chris Watson was elected as the inaugural leader following the first federal election.

Every Australian state and territory has its own branch of the Australian Labor Party, which has its own leader elected from the party members of that jurisdiction.

== Background ==
The federal Labor Caucus comprising the elected members of the Labor party in both Houses of the national Parliament is involved in the election of the federal parliamentary leaders from among its members. The leader has historically been a member of the House of Representatives. Caucus also has the power to dismiss a party leader in a process called a leadership spill. Until 2013, a spill vote could be called at any time and a simple majority of votes in Caucus was sufficient to remove a leader. Following the return of Kevin Rudd to the leadership of the ALP in 2013, he sought changes to the party's rules so that leadership spills would be more difficult to launch in future, including a requirement for 75% majority in Caucus for a leadership spill against a sitting Labor prime minister, or 60% against an opposition leader. The changes also provided for equally weighted voting rights between Caucus and party rank and file members. These changes were adopted by Caucus in July 2013, which was not a change to the party's constitution (and theoretically can be reverted by a simple majority in Caucus). At the October 2013 leadership spill Bill Shorten was the first leader elected under the new rules. Shorten received 55-43 votes in Caucus, which was sufficient to overcome his 40% support among party members.

When the Labor Party is in government, the party leader becomes the Prime Minister and the deputy leader becomes the Deputy Prime Minister. If a Labor prime minister resigns or dies in office, the deputy leader becomes party leader and is sworn in as prime minister on an interim basis until a party successor is elected. This was the case upon the death in office of John Curtin on 5 July 1945. Frank Forde, the deputy party leader, was sworn in as interim prime minister until Ben Chifley was elected by Caucus as party leader on 13 July. If the leader is out of the country or is on leave, the deputy leader acts as party leader and prime minister, without being sworn into the office.

According to recent convention, the leader and deputy leader must be from different factions and from different states. The leadership and deputy leadership have also been gender-balanced.

== Federal leadership ==
=== Leader ===
The federal Leaders of the Australian Labor Party have been as follows (acting leaders indicated in italics):

#	Leader (birth–death)	Electorate	Term start	Term end	Time in office	Elections contested	Prime Minister (term)
1	Chris Watson (1867–1941)	Bland (1901–1906); South Sydney (1906–1910)	20 May 1901	30 October 1907	6 years, 163 days	1903, 1906	Barton 1901–1903
1	Chris Watson (1867–1941)	Bland (1901–1906); South Sydney (1906–1910)	20 May 1901	30 October 1907	6 years, 163 days	1903, 1906	Deakin 1903–1904
1	Chris Watson (1867–1941)	Bland (1901–1906); South Sydney (1906–1910)	20 May 1901	30 October 1907	6 years, 163 days	1903, 1906	Himself 1904
1	Chris Watson (1867–1941)	Bland (1901–1906); South Sydney (1906–1910)	20 May 1901	30 October 1907	6 years, 163 days	1903, 1906	Reid 1904–1905
1	Chris Watson (1867–1941)	Bland (1901–1906); South Sydney (1906–1910)	20 May 1901	30 October 1907	6 years, 163 days	1903, 1906	Deakin 1905–1908
2	Andrew Fisher (1862–1928)	Wide Bay	30 October 1907	27 October 1915	7 years, 362 days	1910, 1913, 1914	Deakin 1905–1908
2	Andrew Fisher (1862–1928)	Wide Bay	30 October 1907	27 October 1915	7 years, 362 days	1910, 1913, 1914	Himself 1908–1909
2	Andrew Fisher (1862–1928)	Wide Bay	30 October 1907	27 October 1915	7 years, 362 days	1910, 1913, 1914	Deakin 1909–1910
2	Andrew Fisher (1862–1928)	Wide Bay	30 October 1907	27 October 1915	7 years, 362 days	1910, 1913, 1914	Himself 1910–1913
2	Andrew Fisher (1862–1928)	Wide Bay	30 October 1907	27 October 1915	7 years, 362 days	1910, 1913, 1914	Cook 1913–1914
2	Andrew Fisher (1862–1928)	Wide Bay	30 October 1907	27 October 1915	7 years, 362 days	1910, 1913, 1914	Himself 1914–1915
3	Billy Hughes (1862–1952)	West Sydney	27 October 1915	14 November 1916	1 year, 18 days	None	Himself 1915–1916
4	Frank Tudor (1866–1922)	Yarra	14 November 1916	10 January 1922†	5 years, 57 days	1917, 1919	Hughes 1916–1917
4	Frank Tudor (1866–1922)	Yarra	14 November 1916	10 January 1922†	5 years, 57 days	1917, 1919	Hughes 1917–1923
5	Matthew Charlton (1866–1948)	Hunter	16 January 1922	16 May 1922	111 days	1922, 1925	Hughes 1917–1923
5	Matthew Charlton (1866–1948)	Hunter	16 May 1922	29 March 1928	5 years, 318 days	1922, 1925	Hughes 1917–1923
5	Matthew Charlton (1866–1948)	Hunter	16 May 1922	29 March 1928	5 years, 318 days	1922, 1925	Bruce 1923–1929
6	James Scullin (1876–1953)	Yarra	26 April 1928	1 October 1935	7 years, 128 days	1928, 1929, 1931, 1934	Bruce 1923–1929
6	James Scullin (1876–1953)	Yarra	26 April 1928	1 October 1935	7 years, 128 days	1928, 1929, 1931, 1934	Himself 1929–1932
6	James Scullin (1876–1953)	Yarra	26 April 1928	1 October 1935	7 years, 128 days	1928, 1929, 1931, 1934	Lyons 1932–1939
7	John Curtin (1885–1945)	Fremantle	1 October 1935	5 July 1945†	9 years, 277 days	1937, 1940, 1943	Lyons 1932–1939
7	John Curtin (1885–1945)	Fremantle	1 October 1935	5 July 1945†	9 years, 277 days	1937, 1940, 1943	Page 1939
7	John Curtin (1885–1945)	Fremantle	1 October 1935	5 July 1945†	9 years, 277 days	1937, 1940, 1943	Menzies 1939–1941
7	John Curtin (1885–1945)	Fremantle	1 October 1935	5 July 1945†	9 years, 277 days	1937, 1940, 1943	Fadden 1941
7	John Curtin (1885–1945)	Fremantle	1 October 1935	5 July 1945†	9 years, 277 days	1937, 1940, 1943	Himself 1941–1945
–	Frank Forde (1890–1983)	Capricornia	6 July 1945	13 July 1945	7 days	None	Himself 1945
8	Ben Chifley (1885–1951)	Macquarie	13 July 1945	13 June 1951†	5 years, 335 days	1946, 1949, 1951	Himself 1945–1949
8	Ben Chifley (1885–1951)	Macquarie	13 July 1945	13 June 1951†	5 years, 335 days	1946, 1949, 1951	Menzies 1949–1966
9	H. V. Evatt (1894–1965)	Barton (1940–1958); Hunter (1958–1960)	20 June 1951	9 February 1960	8 years, 241 days	1954, 1955, 1958	Menzies 1949–1966
10	Arthur Calwell (1896–1973)	Melbourne	7 March 1960	8 February 1967	6 years, 338 days	1961, 1963, 1966	Menzies 1949–1966
10	Arthur Calwell (1896–1973)	Melbourne	7 March 1960	8 February 1967	6 years, 338 days	1961, 1963, 1966	Holt 1966–1967
11	Gough Whitlam (1916–2014)	Werriwa	8 February 1967	22 December 1977	10 years, 317 days	1969, 1972, 1974, 1975, 1977	Holt 1966–1967
11	Gough Whitlam (1916–2014)	Werriwa	8 February 1967	22 December 1977	10 years, 317 days	1969, 1972, 1974, 1975, 1977	McEwen 1967–1968
11	Gough Whitlam (1916–2014)	Werriwa	8 February 1967	22 December 1977	10 years, 317 days	1969, 1972, 1974, 1975, 1977	Gorton 1968–1971
11	Gough Whitlam (1916–2014)	Werriwa	8 February 1967	22 December 1977	10 years, 317 days	1969, 1972, 1974, 1975, 1977	McMahon 1971–1972
11	Gough Whitlam (1916–2014)	Werriwa	8 February 1967	22 December 1977	10 years, 317 days	1969, 1972, 1974, 1975, 1977	Himself 1972–1975
11	Gough Whitlam (1916–2014)	Werriwa	8 February 1967	22 December 1977	10 years, 317 days	1969, 1972, 1974, 1975, 1977	Fraser 1975–1983
12	Bill Hayden (1933-2023)	Oxley	22 December 1977	8 February 1983	5 years, 48 days	1980	Fraser 1975–1983
13	Bob Hawke (1929–2019)	Wills	8 February 1983	19 December 1991	8 years, 314 days	1983, 1984, 1987, 1990	Fraser 1975–1983
13	Bob Hawke (1929–2019)	Wills	8 February 1983	19 December 1991	8 years, 314 days	1983, 1984, 1987, 1990	Himself 1983–1991
14	Paul Keating (b. 1944)	Blaxland	19 December 1991	19 March 1996	4 years, 91 days	1993, 1996	Himself 1991–1996
15	Kim Beazley (b. 1948)	Brand	19 March 1996	22 November 2001	5 years, 248 days	1998, 2001	Howard 1996–2007
16	Simon Crean (1949–2023)	Hotham	22 November 2001	2 December 2003	2 years, 10 days	None	Howard 1996–2007
17	Mark Latham (b. 1961)	Werriwa	2 December 2003	18 January 2005	1 year, 47 days	2004	Howard 1996–2007
(15)	Kim Beazley (b. 1948)	Brand	28 January 2005	4 December 2006	1 year, 320 days	None	Howard 1996–2007
18	Kevin Rudd (b. 1957)	Griffith	4 December 2006	24 June 2010	3 years, 202 days	2007	Howard 1996–2007
18	Kevin Rudd (b. 1957)	Griffith	4 December 2006	24 June 2010	3 years, 202 days	2007	Himself 2007–2010
19	Julia Gillard (b. 1961)	Lalor	24 June 2010	26 June 2013	3 years, 2 days	2010	Herself 2010–2013
(18)	Kevin Rudd (b. 1957)	Griffith	26 June 2013	13 September 2013	79 days	2013	Himself 2013
–	Chris Bowen (b. 1973)	McMahon	18 September 2013	13 October 2013	25 days	None	Abbott 2013–2015
20	Bill Shorten (b. 1967)	Maribyrnong	13 October 2013	30 May 2019	5 years, 229 days	2016, 2019	Abbott 2013–2015
20	Bill Shorten (b. 1967)	Maribyrnong	13 October 2013	30 May 2019	5 years, 229 days	2016, 2019	Turnbull 2015–2018
20	Bill Shorten (b. 1967)	Maribyrnong	13 October 2013	30 May 2019	5 years, 229 days	2016, 2019	Morrison 2018–2022
21	Anthony Albanese (b. 1963)	Grayndler	30 May 2019	Incumbent	7 years, 172 days	2022, 2025	Morrison 2018–2022
21	Anthony Albanese (b. 1963)	Grayndler	30 May 2019	Incumbent	7 years, 172 days	2022, 2025	Himself 2022–present

=== Deputy Leader ===
Shown in chronological order of leadership

#	Deputy Leader	Term start	Term end	Time in office	Leader
1	Gregor McGregor	20 May 1901	30 July 1914	13 years, 71 days	Chris Watson
1	Gregor McGregor	20 May 1901	30 July 1914	13 years, 71 days	Andrew Fisher
2	Billy Hughes	18 September 1914	27 October 1915	1 year, 39 days	Andrew Fisher
3	George Pearce	27 October 1915	14 November 1916	1 year, 18 days	Billy Hughes
4	Albert Gardiner (Note: As Gardiner was a member of the Senate, the party also elected a deputy leader or assistant leader in the House of Representatives. T. J. Ryan was elected assistant leader on 9 September 1920. After Ryan died in office in 1 August 1921, Matthew Charlton was elected as the new deputy leader on 29 September 1921. Charlton was elected leader of the ALP in the House of Representatives on 25 January 1922, following the death of Frank Tudor two weeks earlier. Frank Anstey was elected deputy leader to Charlton on 16 May 1922.)	14 November 1916	30 June 1926	9 years, 228 days	Frank Tudor
4	Albert Gardiner	14 November 1916	30 June 1926	9 years, 228 days	Matthew Charlton
5	James Scullin	17 March 1927	29 March 1928	1 year, 12 days	Matthew Charlton
6	Arthur Blakeley	26 April 1928	5 February 1929	285 days	James Scullin
7	Ted Theodore	5 February 1929	19 December 1931	2 years, 317 days	James Scullin
8	Frank Forde	16 February 1932	28 September 1946	14 years, 224 days	James Scullin
8	Frank Forde	16 February 1932	28 September 1946	14 years, 224 days	John Curtin
8	Frank Forde	16 February 1932	28 September 1946	14 years, 224 days	Ben Chifley
9	H. V. Evatt	31 October 1946	20 June 1951	4 years, 232 days	Ben Chifley
10	Arthur Calwell	20 June 1951	7 March 1960	8 years, 261 days	H. V. Evatt
11	Gough Whitlam	7 March 1960	8 February 1967	6 years, 339 days	Arthur Calwell
12	Lance Barnard	8 February 1967	12 June 1974	7 years, 123 days	Gough Whitlam
13	Jim Cairns	12 June 1974	2 July 1975	1 year, 20 days	Gough Whitlam
14	Frank Crean	2 July 1975	27 January 1976	209 days	Gough Whitlam
15	Tom Uren	27 January 1976	22 December 1977	1 year, 329 days	Gough Whitlam
16	Lionel Bowen	22 December 1977	4 April 1990	12 years, 103 days	Bill Hayden
16	Lionel Bowen	22 December 1977	4 April 1990	12 years, 103 days	Bob Hawke
17	Paul Keating	4 April 1990	3 Jun 1991	1 year, 60 days	Bob Hawke
18	Brian Howe	3 June 1991	20 June 1995	4 years, 17 days	Bob Hawke
18	Brian Howe	3 June 1991	20 June 1995	4 years, 17 days	Paul Keating
19	Kim Beazley	20 June 1995	19 March 1996	273 days	Paul Keating
20	Gareth Evans	19 March 1996	19 October 1998	2 years, 214 days	Kim Beazley
21	Simon Crean	19 October 1998	22 November 2001	3 years, 34 days	Kim Beazley
22	Jenny Macklin	22 November 2001	4 December 2006	5 years, 12 days	Simon Crean
22	Jenny Macklin	22 November 2001	4 December 2006	5 years, 12 days	Mark Latham
22	Jenny Macklin	22 November 2001	4 December 2006	5 years, 12 days	Kim Beazley
23	Julia Gillard	4 December 2006	24 June 2010	3 years, 202 days	Kevin Rudd
24	Wayne Swan	24 June 2010	27 June 2013	3 years, 3 days	Julia Gillard
25	Anthony Albanese	27 June 2013	14 October 2013	109 days	Kevin Rudd
26	Tanya Plibersek	14 October 2013	30 May 2019	5 years, 228 days	Bill Shorten
27	Richard Marles	30 May 2019	Incumbent	7 years, 172 days	Anthony Albanese

=== Senate Leader ===
#	Senate Leader	Term start	Term end	Time in office	Leader(s)
1	Gregor McGregor	20 May 1901	13 August 1914	13 years, 85 days	Watson; Fisher
2	George Pearce	17 September 1914	14 November 1916	2 years, 58 days	Fisher; Hughes
3	Albert Gardiner	14 November 1916	30 June 1926	9 years, 228 days	Tudor; Charlton
4	Ted Needham	9 July 1926	25 June 1929	2 years, 351 days	Charlton; Scullin
5	John Daly	25 June 1929	3 March 1931	1 year, 251 days	Scullin
6	John Barnes	25 June 1929	30 June 1935	6 years, 5 days	Scullin
7	Joe Collings	30 June 1935	20 September 1943	8 years, 82 days	Scullin; Curtin
8	Richard Keane	20 September 1943	26 April 1946	2 years, 218 days	Curtin; Chifley
9	Bill Ashley	17 June 1946	11 June 1951	4 years, 359 days	Chifley
10	Nick McKenna	11 June 1951	17 Aug 1966	15 years, 67 days	Chifley; Evatt; Calwell
11	Don Willesee	17 August 1966	8 February 1967	175 days	Calwell
12	Lionel Murphy	8 February 1967	9 February 1975	8 years, 1 day	Whitlam
13	Ken Wriedt	10 February 1975	25 September 1980	5 years, 228 days	Whitlam; Hayden
14	John Button	7 November 1980	24 March 1993	12 years, 137 days	Hayden; Hawke; Keating
15	Gareth Evans	24 March 1993	6 February 1996	2 years, 319 days	Keating
16	John Faulkner	19 March 1996	22 October 2004	8 years, 217 days	Beazley; Crean; Latham
17	Chris Evans	22 October 2004	4 February 2013	8 years, 103 days	Latham; Beazley; Rudd; Gillard
18	Stephen Conroy	4 February 2013	26 June 2013	142 days	Gillard
19	Penny Wong	26 June 2013	Incumbent	13 years, 145 days	Rudd; Shorten; Albanese

== State and territory heads of government ==
=== Australian Capital Territory ===
- Rosemary Follett (1989, 1991–1995, inaugural Chief Minister of the ACT, and first female head of government of an Australian state or territory)
- Jon Stanhope (2001–2011)
- Katy Gallagher (2011–2014)
- Andrew Barr (2014–)

=== New South Wales ===
- James McGowen (1910–1913)
- William Holman (1913–1916)
- John Storey (1920–21)
- James Dooley (1921, 1921–22)
- Jack Lang (1925–1927, 1930–1932)
- William McKell (1941–1947)
- James McGirr (1947–1952)
- Joseph Cahill (1952–1959)
- Bob Heffron (1959–1964)
- Jack Renshaw (1964–65)
- Neville Wran (1976–1986)
- Barrie Unsworth (1986–1988)
- Bob Carr (1995–2005)
- Morris Iemma (2005–2008)
- Nathan Rees (2008–09)
- Kristina Keneally (2009–2011, first female premier of New South Wales)
- Chris Minns (2023–)

=== Northern Territory ===
- Clare Martin (2001–2007, first Labor Chief Minister of the Northern Territory, first female Chief Minister of the Northern Territory)
- Paul Henderson (2007–2012)
- Michael Gunner (2016–2022)
- Natasha Fyles (2022–2023)
- Eva Lawler (2023–2024)

=== Queensland ===
- Anderson Dawson (1899, world's first leader of a parliamentary socialist government)
- T. J. Ryan (1915–1919)
- Ted Theodore (1919–1925)
- William Gillies (1925)
- William McCormack (1925–1929)
- William Forgan Smith (1932–1942)
- Frank Cooper (1942–1946)
- Ned Hanlon (1946–1952)
- Vince Gair (1952–1957)
- Wayne Goss (1989–1996)
- Peter Beattie (1998–2007)
- Anna Bligh (2007–2012, first female premier of Queensland, and first woman in Australia to win an election as premier)
- Annastacia Palaszczuk (2015–2023)
- Steven Miles (2023–2024)

=== South Australia ===
- Thomas Price (1905–1909)
- John Verran (1910–1912)
- Crawford Vaughan (1915–1917)
- John Gunn (1924–1926)
- Lionel Hill (1926–27, 1930–1933)
- Robert Richards (1933)
- Frank Walsh (1965–1967)
- Don Dunstan (1967–68, 1970–1979)
- Des Corcoran (1979)
- John Bannon (1982–1992)
- Lynn Arnold (1992–93)
- Mike Rann (2002–2011)
- Jay Weatherill (2011–2018)
- Peter Malinauskas (2022–)

=== Tasmania ===
- John Earle (1909, 1914–1916)
- Joseph Lyons (1923–1928)
- Albert Ogilvie (1934–1939)
- Edmund Dwyer-Gray (1939)
- Robert Cosgrove (1939–1947, 1948–1958)
- Edward Brooker (1947–48)
- Eric Reece (1958–1969, 1972–1975)
- Bill Neilson (1975–1977)
- Doug Lowe (1977–1981)
- Harry Holgate (1981–82)
- Michael Field (1989–1992)
- Jim Bacon (1998–2004)
- Paul Lennon (2004–2008)
- David Bartlett (2008–2011)
- Lara Giddings (2011–2014, first female Premier of Tasmania)

=== Victoria ===
- George Elmslie (1913)
- George Prendergast (1924)
- Edmond Hogan (1927–28, 1929–1932)
- John Cain (34th Premier of Victoria) (1943, 1945–1947, 1952–1955)
- John Cain (41st Premier of Victoria) (1982–1990)
- Joan Kirner (1990–1992, first female premier of Victoria)
- Steve Bracks (1999–2007)
- John Brumby (2007–2010)
- Daniel Andrews (2014–2023)
- Jacinta Allan (2023–2026)
- Ben Carroll (2026–)

=== Western Australia ===
- Henry Daglish (1904–05)
- John Scaddan (1911–1916)
- Philip Collier (1924–1930, 1933–1936)
- John Willcock (1936–1945)
- Frank Wise (1945–1947)
- Albert Hawke (1953–1959)
- John Tonkin (1971–1974)
- Brian Burke (1983–1988)
- Peter Dowding (1988–1990)
- Carmen Lawrence (1990–1993, first female premier of an Australian state)
- Geoff Gallop (2001–2006)
- Alan Carpenter (2006–2008)
- Mark McGowan (2017–2023)
- Roger Cook (2023–)

== Federal Leaders by time in office ==
This list ranks federal leaders of the Labor Party by their time in office. Leaders that also served as Prime Minister are in bold. Where leaders served non-consecutive terms, their total time as leader is ranked together.

Rank	No.	Leader	Time in office
1	11th	**Gough Whitlam**	10 years, 317 days
2	7th	**John Curtin**	9 years, 277 days
3	13th	**Bob Hawke**	8 years, 314 days
4	9th	H. V. Evatt	8 years, 241 days
5	2nd	**Andrew Fisher**	7 years, 362 days
6	15th	Kim Beazley	7 years, 203 days
7	6th	**James Scullin**	7 years, 128 days
8	21st	**Anthony Albanese**	7 years, 172 days (Note: As of 18 November 2026)
9	10th	Arthur Calwell	6 years, 338 days
10	1st	**Chris Watson**	6 years, 163 days
11	5th	Matthew Charlton	6 years, 64 days
12	8th	**Ben Chifley**	5 years, 335 days
13	20th	Bill Shorten	5 years, 229 days
14	4th	Frank Tudor	5 years, 57 days
15	12th	Bill Hayden	5 years, 48 days
16	14th	**Paul Keating**	4 years, 91 days
17	18th	**Kevin Rudd**	3 years, 281 days
18	19th	**Julia Gillard**	3 years, 2 days
19	16th	Simon Crean	2 years, 10 days
20	17th	Mark Latham	1 year, 47 days
21	3rd	**Billy Hughes**	1 year, 18 days

== See also ==
- Leader of the Liberal Party of Australia
- Leaders of the Australian Greens
