= The Latham Diaries =

2005 book by Mark Latham

- Author: Mark Latham
- Language: English
- Genre: Autobiography
- Publisher: Melbourne University Press
- Publication date: 2005
- Publication place: Australia
- Media type: Print
- ISBN: 0-522-85215-7
- OCLC: 224401249
- LC Class: DU117.2.L37 A3 2005

The Latham Diaries is a political memoir by the former Federal Parliamentary Australian Labor Party (ALP) leader, Mark Latham. The book, published in 2005 by Melbourne University Press, attracted a great amount of criticism, predominantly from members of the ALP. Much of the controversy revolved around Latham's candid and scathing criticisms of the ALP, as well as highly personal and occasionally ribald comments regarding some individuals.

== Synopsis ==
The book is an abridgement of Latham's personal diary, from his election to the Australian House of Representatives in 1994 until his retirement in 2005. He has claimed that the book is not intended to discredit the ALP but rather to correct the record for the benefit of his sons. He alleged that the media has not accurately portrayed him during his time in Parliament.

Latham frequently refers to his belief that in the 10 years between the ALP losing office in 1996 and publication of the Diaries, Labor failed to respond to major changes in Australian society, wrought by globalisation and the policies of the Keating and the Howard governments. Latham claims that under the leadership of both Kim Beazley and Simon Crean, the party has failed to develop new and innovative policies and has either looked backwards and inwards for ideas or taken a purely negative position with government initiatives.

Latham reiterates his belief, expounded in earlier books such as Civilising Global Capital (1998) that the ALP should reject many of its traditional policies, such as protectionism and the welfare state, but instead focus on the expansion of social capital. Those views and Latham's frustrations with the development of party policy over time, are shown in his entry for August 12, 1999:

The horse bolted in the first half of the [20th] century when Labor abandoned its mutualist traditions—socialism in the relationship between people—and embraced the welfare state—socialism in the relationship between government and its citizens. We can talk about the Third Way, a fourth way, a fifth way. In practice, it will take a miracle for the control freaks and power junkies of the Labor movement to reform their ways. I'm pissing in the wind. (p.110)

In the book and in interviews following its release, Latham also singled out Beazley for harsh criticism on the grounds of character. He alleged that as both party leader and an ordinary MP, Beazley failed to offer Latham and other Labor MPs the support and loyalty that they were due. In one comment, he described Beazley as "a dirty dog" who is "not fit to clean toilets at Parliament house".

== Reception ==
The book sold rapidly, and the publisher had to order a second print run before the first had gone on sale. The book has been described as showing insight into the Parliamentary Labor Party after Keating.
