= 2003 Australian Labor Party leadership spills =

Election in Australia

Two leadership spills of the Australian Labor Party (ALP), the official opposition party in the Parliament of Australia, were held on 16 June 2003 and 2 December 2003, respectively. The Opposition Leader, Simon Crean, won the ballot in June against former opposition leader Kim Beazley, but resigned as leader in late November after losing support from his colleagues and did not contest the December ballot which Mark Latham won against Kim Beazley.

== June 2003 spill ==
June 2003 Australian Labor Party Leadership spill
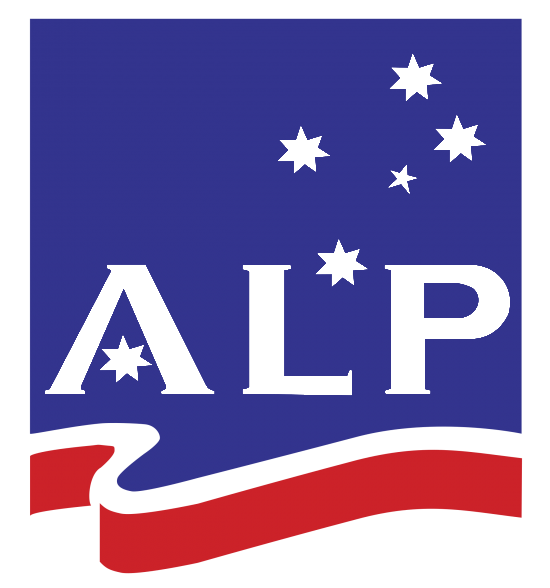
- 16 June 2003
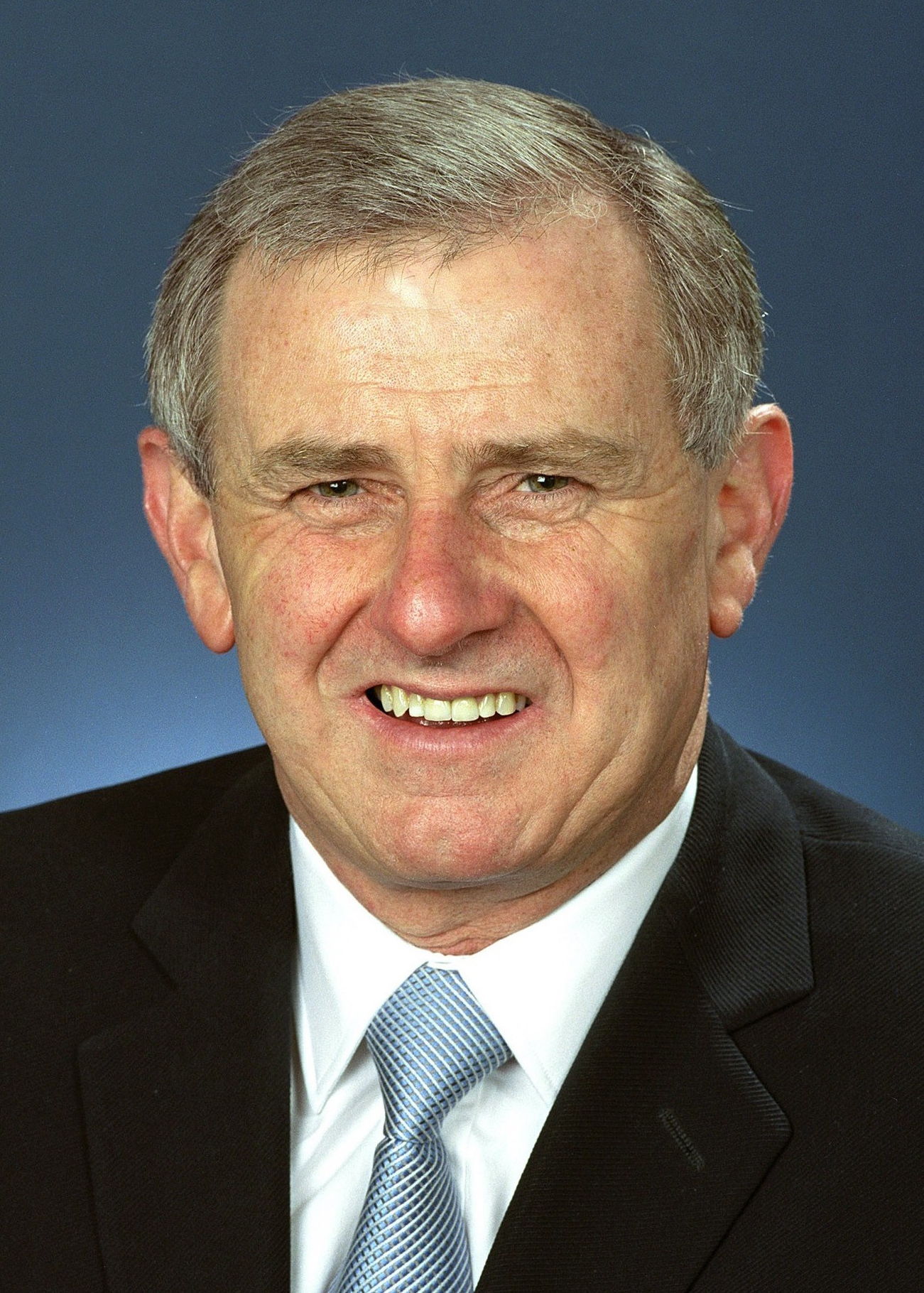

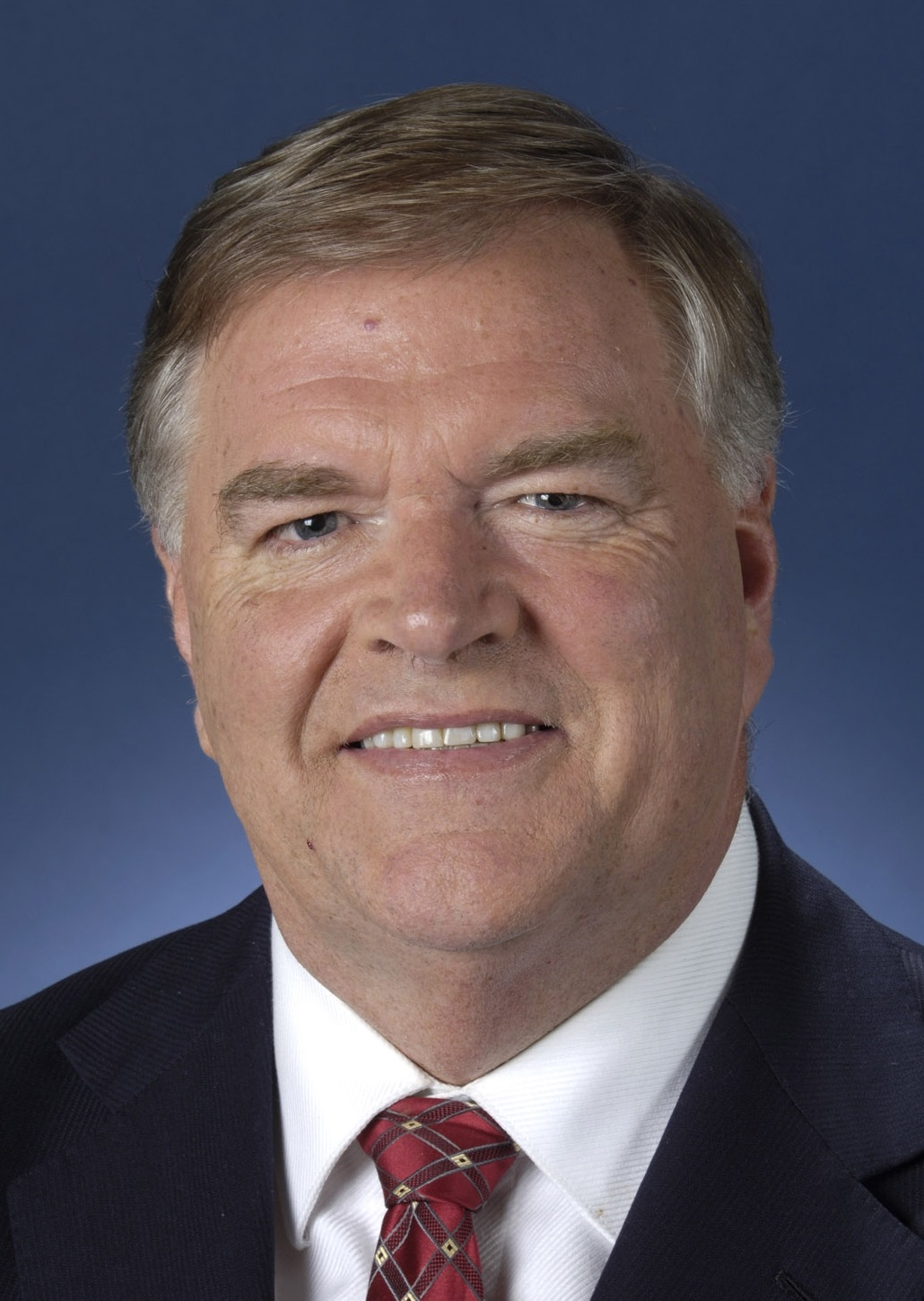
Candidate	Simon Crean	Kim Beazley
Caucus vote	58	34
Percentage	63.0%	37.0%
Seat	Hotham (VIC)	Brand (WA)
Faction	Right	Right
Leader before election
Simon Crean
Elected Leader
Simon Crean

=== Background ===
Simon Crean had become leader of the Labor Party and opposition leader unopposed at a leadership ballot on 11 November 2001 held to replace Kim Beazley, who fought two elections as Labor leader at the 1998 and 2001 elections. Crean had also been deputy leader between 1998 and 2001 and was succeeded as deputy leader by Jenny Macklin.

Despite a successful budget reply and the controversy surrounding Howard-appointed Governor-General Peter Hollingworth, Crean had a low popularity rating throughout 2003. With constant rumours over a possible challenge plaguing his leadership, Crean called a leadership spill to be held on June 16, 2003.

=== Candidates ===
- Kim Beazley, former leader, member for Brand
- Simon Crean, incumbent leader, member for Hotham

=== Potential candidates who declined to run ===
The following individuals ruled themselves out as candidates or were the subject of media speculation but did not stand:

- Kevin Rudd, Shadow Minister for Foreign Affairs, member for Griffith,

==== Results ====
The ballot was held on 16 June 2003, in which Crean convincingly defeated Beazley 58–34, despite opinion polls showing more public support for Beazley.

Candidate	Final ballot	%
Simon Crean	58	63.0
Kim Beazley	34	37.0

== December 2003 spill ==
December 2003 Australian Labor Party Leadership spill
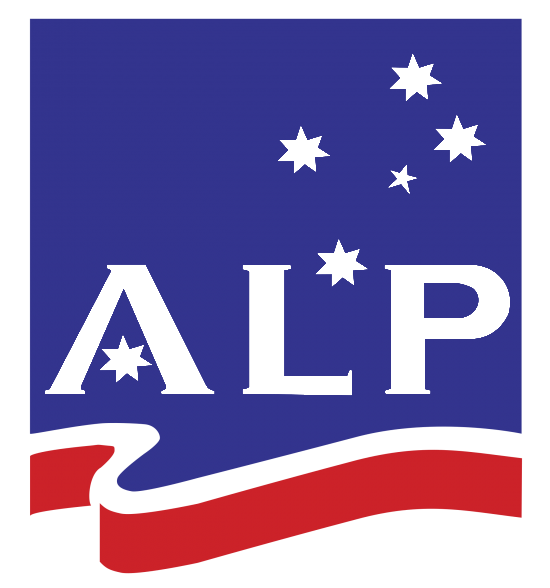
- 2 December 2003
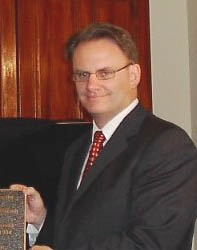

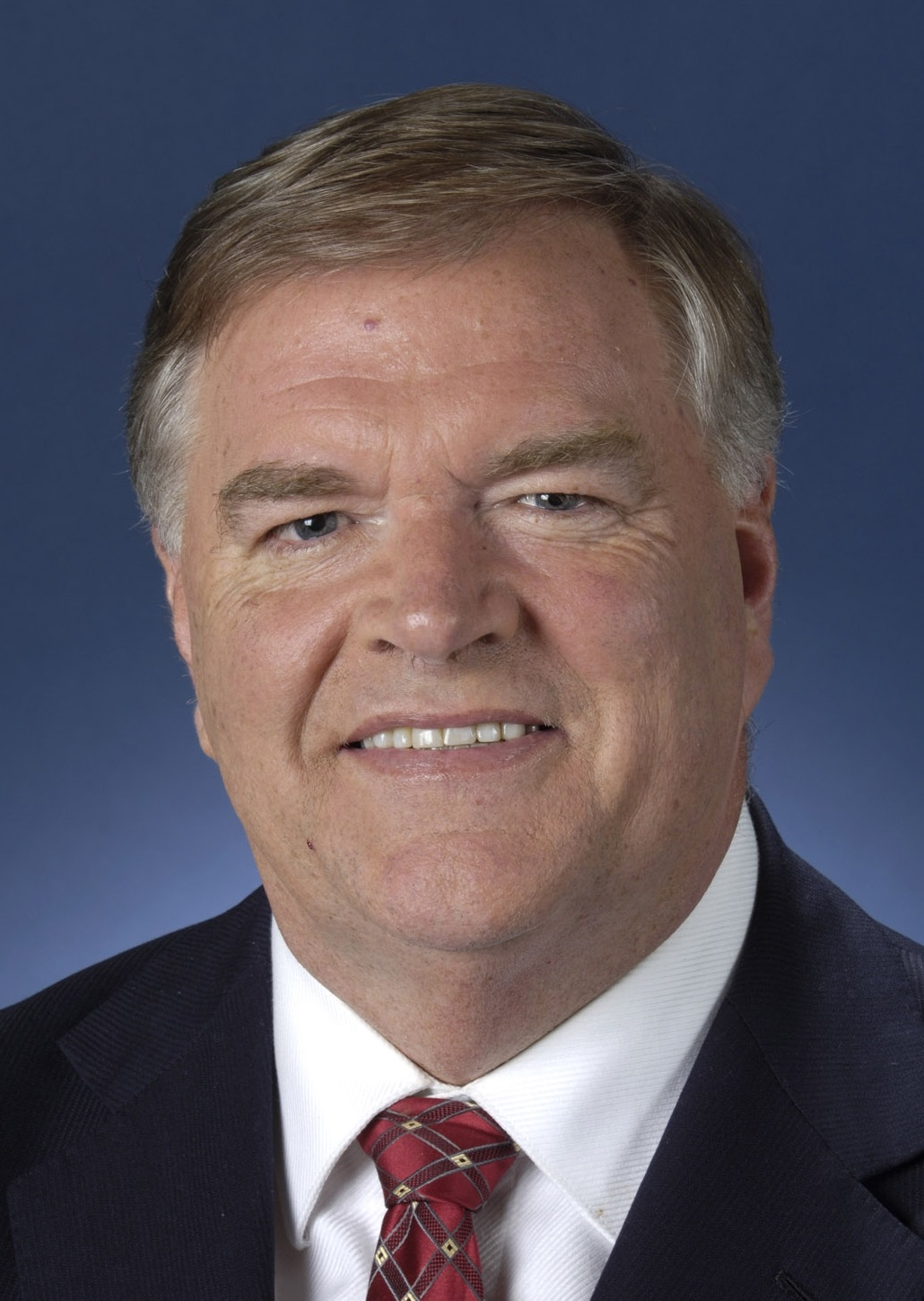
Candidate	Mark Latham	Kim Beazley
Caucus vote	47	45
Percentage	51.1%	48.9%
Seat	Werriwa (NSW)	Brand (WA)
Faction	Right	Right
Leader before election
Simon Crean
Elected Leader
Mark Latham

=== Background ===
However, by November, Crean had lost more ground to John Howard as preferred prime minister. On 27 November 2003, a section of Crean's senior colleagues informed him that he had lost support and should step down as leader. Crean said he would "sleep on it", and announced the following day that he would resign as leader. In doing so, Crean became the first Labor leader to have not contested an election since Billy Hughes was expelled from the Labor party in 1916.

=== Candidates ===
- Kim Beazley, former leader, member for Brand
  - Supporters: Jenny Macklin, Kevin Rudd, Wayne Swan, Bob McMullan, Stephen Conroy, Stephen Smith
- Mark Latham, Shadow Treasurer, member for Werriwa
  - Supporters: Simon Crean, Julia Gillard, Paul Keating, Gough Whitlam

=== Potential candidates who declined to run ===
The following individuals ruled themselves out as candidates or were the subject of media speculation but did not stand:

- Kevin Rudd, Shadow Minister for Foreign Affairs, member for Griffith
- Julia Gillard, Shadow Minister for Health and Manager of Opposition Business in the House, member for Lalor

==== Results ====
The ballot was held on Tuesday 2 December in which Latham defeated Beazley by a margin of two votes (47–45).

Candidate	Final ballot	%
Mark Latham	47	51.1
Kim Beazley	45	48.9

== Aftermath ==
Latham went on to lose the federal election in October 2004. Latham stayed on for a few months as leader until January 2005 when he stood down citing ill health. Beazley then returned to the leadership unopposed and remained leader until December 2006 when he was ousted by Kevin Rudd.

== See also ==
- 2005 Australian Labor Party leadership spill
- 2006 Australian Labor Party leadership spill
- 2001 Australian Labor Party leadership election
