= Simon Crean =

Australian politician (1949–2023)

The Honourable Simon Crean AC
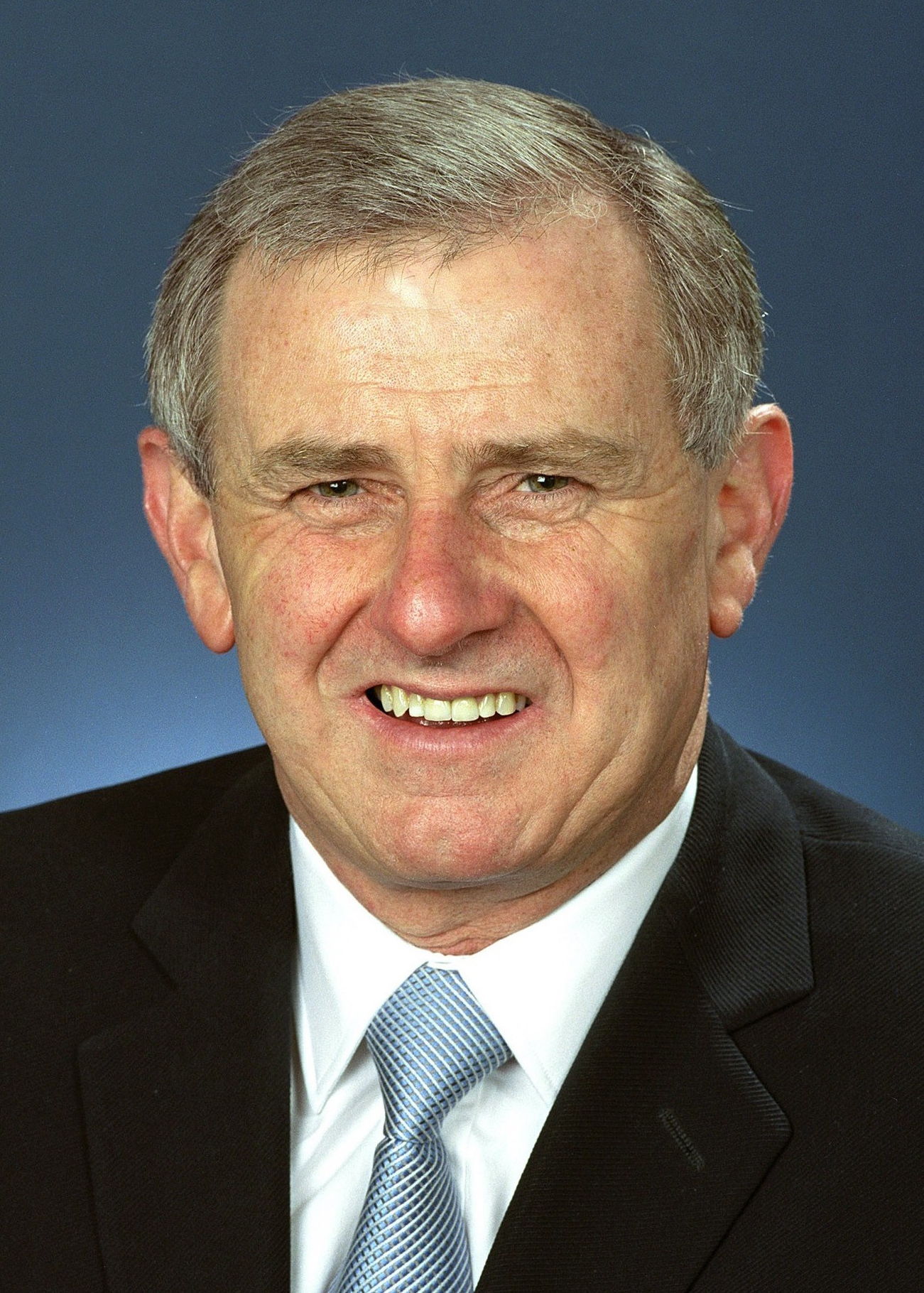
- Official portrait, 2007

Leader of the Opposition
- In office 22 November 2001 – 2 December 2003
- Prime Minister: John Howard
- Deputy: Jenny Macklin
- Preceded by: Kim Beazley
- Succeeded by: Mark Latham

Leader of the Labor Party
- In office 22 November 2001 – 2 December 2003
- Deputy: Jenny Macklin
- Preceded by: Kim Beazley
- Succeeded by: Mark Latham

Deputy Leader of the Labor Party
- In office 19 October 1998 – 22 November 2001
- Leader: Kim Beazley
- Preceded by: Gareth Evans
- Succeeded by: Jenny Macklin
Minister 2007–2013
Minister for Regional Australia, Regional Development and Local Government
In office 14 September 2010 – 21 March 2013
Prime Minister	Julia Gillard
Preceded by	Anthony Albanese
Succeeded by	Anthony Albanese
Minister for the Arts
In office 14 September 2010 – 21 March 2013
Prime Minister	Julia Gillard
Preceded by	Peter Garrett
Succeeded by	Tony Burke
Minister for Education
In office 28 June 2010 – 14 September 2010
Prime Minister	Julia Gillard
Preceded by	Julia Gillard
Succeeded by	Peter Garrett (as Minister for School Education, Early Childhood and Youth); Chris Evans (as Minister for Tertiary Education, Skills, Jobs and Workplace Relations)
Minister for Employment and Workplace Relations
In office 28 June 2010 – 14 September 2010
Prime Minister	Julia Gillard
Preceded by	Julia Gillard
Succeeded by	Chris Evans (as Minister for Tertiary Education, Skills, Jobs and Workplace Relations)
Minister for Social Inclusion
In office 28 June 2010 – 14 September 2010
Prime Minister	Julia Gillard
Preceded by	Julia Gillard
Succeeded by	Tanya Plibersek
Minister for Trade
In office 3 December 2007 – 28 June 2010
Prime Minister	Kevin Rudd; Julia Gillard
Preceded by	Warren Truss
Succeeded by	Stephen Smith

Manager of Opposition Business
- In office 20 March 1996 – 20 October 1998
- Leader: Kim Beazley
- Preceded by: Peter Reith
- Succeeded by: Bob McMullan
Minister 1990–1996
Minister for Employment, Education and Training
In office 23 December 1993 – 11 March 1996
Prime Minister	Paul Keating
Preceded by	Kim Beazley
Succeeded by	Amanda Vanstone
Minister for Primary Industries and Energy
In office 4 June 1991 – 23 December 1993
Prime Minister	Bob Hawke; Paul Keating
Preceded by	John Kerin
Succeeded by	Bob Collins
Minister for Science and Technology
In office 4 April 1990 – 4 June 1991
Prime Minister	Bob Hawke
Preceded by	Barry Jones
Succeeded by	Ross Free

Member of the Australian Parliament for Hotham
- In office 24 March 1990 – 5 August 2013
- Preceded by: Lewis Kent
- Succeeded by: Clare O'Neil

President of the Australian Council of Trade Unions
- In office 1 March 1985 – 25 March 1990
- Preceded by: Cliff Dolan
- Succeeded by: Martin Ferguson

Personal details
- Born: Simon Findlay Crean; 26 February 1949 Melbourne, Victoria, Australia
- Died: 25 June 2023 (aged 74) Berlin, Germany
- Party: Labor
- Spouse: Carole Crean (m. 1973)
- Children: 2
- Parents: Frank Crean (father); Mary Findlay (mother)
- Relatives: Stephen Crean (brother); David Crean (brother)
- Education: Melbourne High School
- Alma mater: Monash University

Simon Findlay Crean (26 February 1949 – 25 June 2023) was an Australian politician and trade unionist. He was the leader of the Australian Labor Party (ALP) and leader of the opposition from 2001 to 2003. He represented the seat of Hotham in the House of Representatives from 1990 to 2013 and was a cabinet minister in the Hawke, Keating, Rudd and Gillard governments.

Crean was born in Melbourne, the son of Frank Crean who was deputy prime minister under Gough Whitlam. He studied law and economics at Monash University and was involved in the trade union movement from a young age, becoming general secretary of the Storemen and Packers' Union in 1979. He was elected vice-president of the Australian Council of Trade Unions (ACTU) in 1981 and president in 1985. Crean stood down from this role upon his election to parliament at the 1990 federal election, and was immediately appointed Minister for Science and Technology in the Hawke government. He held several other ministerial posts until Labor's defeat at the 1996 election.

Following Labor's 1998 election defeat, Crean was elected deputy leader of the ALP under Kim Beazley, replacing Gareth Evans. He was elected unopposed to succeed Beazley as party leader following further defeat at the 2001 election, becoming leader of the opposition. In 2003, he led Labor's opposition to the invasion of Iraq. Despite initial enthusiasm for his leadership, Crean struggled in opinion polling, and in June 2003 Beazley challenged him for the leadership. Although Crean won comfortably, speculation about his leadership only intensified, and in November 2003 he announced that he would resign, and was replaced by his shadow treasurer Mark Latham.

Despite losing the leadership, Crean remained a senior figure within the Labor Party, and returned to cabinet as Minister for Trade when Labor won the 2007 election. Crean supported Julia Gillard in her leadership challenge to Kevin Rudd in June 2010, and remained in the Cabinet after she was successful. Although he continued to support Gillard through the leadership spill in February 2012, in March 2013 he announced that he was switching support to Rudd, sparking another leadership spill; Gillard sacked him from the Cabinet in response. When Rudd eventually did return as prime minister at the leadership spill in June 2013, Crean ran unsuccessfully to return to the role of deputy leader; he subsequently announced his decision to retire from politics at the 2013 election.

== Early life and education ==
Crean was born in Melbourne on 26 February 1949. He was one of three sons born to Mary (née Findlay) and Frank Crean. His father was a federal Labor MP from 1951 to 1977, who served periods as Treasurer and Deputy Prime Minister in the Whitlam government. One of his brothers, David Crean, a medical doctor, was a Member of the Tasmanian Parliament. His other brother, Stephen Crean, a public servant, died while skiing alone at Charlotte Pass, New South Wales, in 1985, aged 38; his body was not found for two years.

Crean grew up in the inner Melbourne suburb of Middle Park. He was educated at Melbourne High School, before going to Monash University where he graduated with a Bachelor of Economics and Bachelor of Laws.

== Trade unionist ==
Following his graduation from Monash University, Crean worked in several roles with various trade unions, before becoming an official within the Storeman and Packers Union (SPU). In 1977, aged 28, he stood for ALP preselection to succeed his father in the seat of Melbourne Ports, widely considered a safe Labor seat. He was defeated for preselection by former ALP state leader Clyde Holding, with Holding winning the ballot by 36 votes to 34.

In 1979, Crean was elected General Secretary of the SPU, which entitled him to a seat on the board of the Australian Council of Trade Unions (ACTU). He was elected ACTU vice-president in 1981, before in 1985 winning election as ACTU president. In this position, he played a key role in negotiating numerous agreements on wages and other industrial issues as part of the Prices and Incomes Accord with the Government of Prime Minister Bob Hawke, himself a former ACTU president.

As ACTU president, Crean served on the board of Qantas from 1987 to 1990 and on the board of the Australian Industry Development Corporation from 1988 to 1990.

== Political career ==
=== Hawke and Keating governments ===
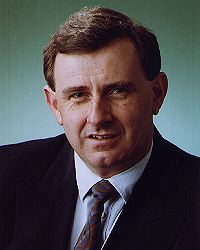
Crean as a minister in the 1990s.

Ahead of the 1990 election, Crean was easily selected as the Labor candidate for the safe seat of Hotham; he was elected to Parliament on 24 March, and immediately entered the Cabinet as Minister for Science and Technology. He became Minister for Primary Industries and Energy in 1991, retaining this job when Paul Keating replaced Bob Hawke as prime minister in December 1991. After Labor's victory at the 1993 election, Keating moved Crean to become Minister for Employment, Education and Training, a role he held until 1996.

=== Opposition ===
After the Labor Party was heavily defeated at the 1996 election, Crean chose to contest the deputy leadership, but was defeated by Gareth Evans by 42 votes to 37. He joined the Shadow Cabinet, and after Evans retired from politics following Labor's 1998 election defeat, Crean was easily elected to replace him, becoming Deputy Leader of the Opposition and Shadow Treasurer. In January 2001, Crean was awarded the Centenary Medal.

In November 2001, following Labor's third consecutive election defeat, Crean was elected unopposed to replace Kim Beazley as Leader of the Labor Party, becoming leader of the opposition; Jenny Macklin was elected as his deputy, also unopposed. On 4 February 2003, Crean led the Labor Party to condemn Prime Minister John Howard's decision to commit Australian troops to the Iraq War.

Throughout most of 2003, poor opinion polling led to speculation of a leadership challenge against Crean; on 16 June 2003, Crean called a leadership spill intending to put an end to the leadership tensions, winning against Kim Beazley by 58 votes to 34. This failed to stop Crean losing even further ground to Howard in opinion polls as preferred Prime Minister, and on 28 November 2003, Crean announced that he would resign as Leader of the Labor Party, stating that he felt he no longer had the confidence of his colleagues; this made him the first Labor Leader not to contest a federal election since 1916. On 2 December, Shadow Treasurer Mark Latham defeated Kim Beazley in a ballot by 47 votes to 45 to replace Crean; Latham appointed Crean immediately as Shadow Treasurer. After Labor suffered a fourth consecutive defeat at the 2004 election, Crean resigned from his Shadow Treasurer position; he initially intended to resign from the Shadow Cabinet entirely, but at Latham's insistence, he accepted the role of Shadow Minister for Trade.

Crean retained this position when Beazley returned to the leadership in January 2005. However, in a reshuffle of the Shadow Cabinet in June 2005, Crean was demoted to Shadow Minister for Regional Development. He then faced a pre-selection challenge for his seat of Hotham from Martin Pakula, a member of his former union, the SPU, a move which Crean publicly blamed on Beazley, Hong Lim, and the Labor Right. Beazley refused to publicly support either candidate, but several frontbenchers, including Julia Gillard, supported Crean. This helped Crean to comfortably win the pre-selection for his seat; Crean singled out Senator Stephen Conroy for his part in the move against him, describing his front-bench colleague as "venal" and "one of the most disloyal people I've ever worked with in my life". Following the replacement of Kim Beazley by Kevin Rudd as leader in December 2006, Rudd reappointed Crean as Shadow Minister for Trade.

=== Rudd and Gillard governments ===
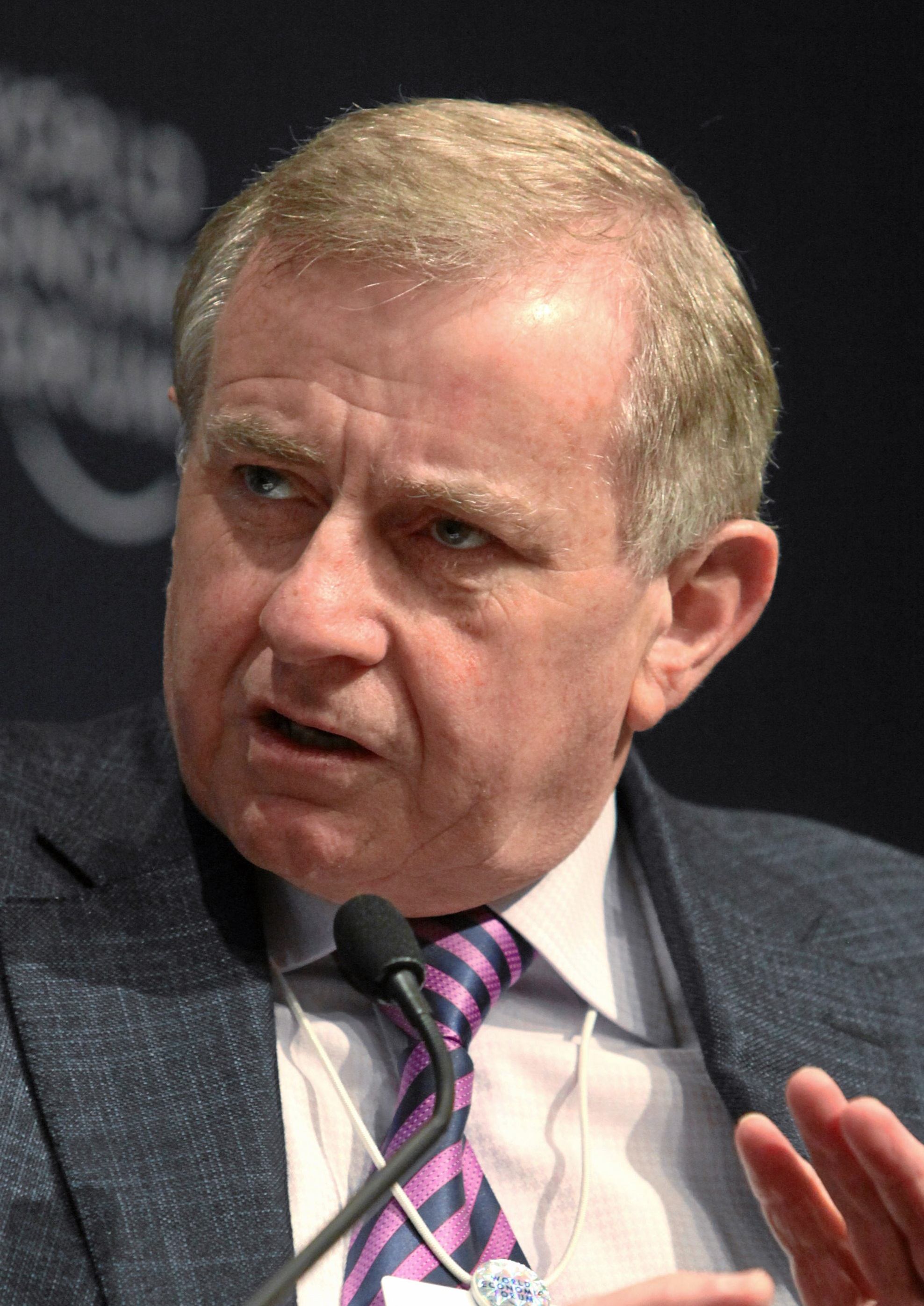
Crean at the World Economic Forum in January 2010.

After Labor's victory at the 2007 election, new Prime Minister Kevin Rudd appointed Crean to the Cabinet as Minister for Trade. In this role, Crean visited Singapore and Vietnam to pursue Australia's trade and economic interests at a range of ministerial and other high-level meetings. Crean also attended the APEC Meeting of Ministers Responsible for Trade and the OECD Roundtable on Sustainable Development on behalf of the Australian Government. Crean also co-chaired the 8th Joint Trade and Economic Cooperation Committee with the Vietnamese Minister of Planning and Investment Võ Hồng Phúc in Hanoi, leading to an improvement in the trading relationship between Australia and Vietnam.

Following Julia Gillard's election unopposed as prime minister in June 2010, Crean was appointed to replace Gillard in the role of Minister for Education, Employment and Workplace Relations, with Stephen Smith taking over as Minister for Trade. After the 2010 election, Gillard reshuffled the Cabinet and appointed Crean as Minister for the Arts and Minister for Regional Development and Local Government.

On 21 March 2013, following significant leadership tensions arising from poor opinion polling, Crean called for Gillard to spill the leadership, with the aim of encouraging Rudd to challenge for the position of prime minister. This marked a change in Crean's position; he had long been a committed supporter of Gillard. Crean said he would challenge Wayne Swan for the role of deputy leader, if Rudd ran for the leadership. However, Rudd declined to run, leaving Gillard to retain the leadership unopposed. Gillard quickly sacked Crean from the Cabinet, expressing publicly her disappointment at his "disloyalty" to her. Crean became the first Labor minister to be sacked with a dismissal letter from the Governor General since Jim Cairns in 1975.

Before his sacking, Crean had been one of the few federal politicians to have never spent time on the backbench. After Rudd did eventually replace Gillard as prime minister in June 2013, Crean ran for the position of Deputy Leader but was defeated by Anthony Albanese by 61 votes to 38. Crean subsequently announced he would retire from politics at the 2013 election.

Crean retired as the first person to serve as a Cabinet Minister under four Labor Prime Ministers (Hawke, Keating, Rudd and Gillard) since Jack Beasley (who served under James Scullin, John Curtin, Frank Forde and Ben Chifley).

== Career after politics ==
In October 2014, Crean was elected chairman of the Australian Livestock Exporters Council. He was re-elected for a second term in 2016.

Crean was an associate professor at Deakin University and chaired the university's Advanced Manufacturing Group. In 2014 Deakin University awarded him an Honorary Doctor of Laws. The same year, he returned to his alma mater Monash University as a member of the University Council, serving as Deputy Chancellor from 2020 until his death in 2023.

Other positions Crean held included chair of the Australia-Korea Business Council, the Australian Livestock Exporters' Council, the European Australian Business Council and co-chair of Cornerstone Group Advisory Board. Crean was also a director on the boards of Linfox and Melbourne's Luna Park.

Crean was posthumously appointed a Companion of the Order of Australia in the 2024 King's Birthday Honours.

== Personal life ==
Crean was married to Carole for 50 years and they had two children. He was a supporter and patron of the North Melbourne Football Club.

Crean died from a pulmonary embolism in Berlin, on 25 June 2023, while visiting Germany as part of an industry delegation as head of the European Australian Business Council. He was 74. Prime Minister Anthony Albanese called him "a giant of the labour movement". He confirmed Crean would be given a state funeral.

== See also ==
- Fourth Hawke Ministry
- First Keating Ministry
- Second Keating Ministry
- First Rudd Ministry
- First Gillard Ministry
- Second Gillard Ministry
- Political families of Australia

Trade union offices
Preceded by Cliff Dolan	President of the Australian Council of Trade Unions; 1985–1990	Succeeded by Martin Ferguson
Parliament of Australia
Preceded by Lewis Kent	Member for Hotham; 1990–2013	Succeeded by Clare O'Neil
Political offices
Preceded by Barry Jones as Minister for Science, Customs and Small Business	Minister for Science and Technology; 1990–1991	Succeeded by Ross Free
Preceded by Barry Jones as Minister Assisting the Prime Minister for Science and Technology	Minister Assisting the Prime Minister for Science; 1990–1991	Succeeded by Ross Free
Preceded by Peter Morris	Minister Assisting the Treasurer; 1990–1991	Succeeded by Ross Free
Preceded by John Kerin	Minister for Primary Industries and Energy; 1991–1993	Succeeded by Bob Collins
Preceded by Kim Beazley	Minister for Employment, Education and Training; 1993–1996	Succeeded by Amanda Vanstone as Minister for Employment, Education, Training and Youth Affairs
Preceded by Peter Reith	Manager of Opposition Business in the House; 1996–1998	Succeeded by Bob McMullan
Preceded by John Moore as Shadow Minister for Industry and Commerce	Shadow Minister for Industry and Regional Development; 1996–1998	Succeeded by Bob McMullan as Shadow Minister for Industry and Technology
Preceded by Ian Macdonald as Shadow Minister for Regional Development	Shadow Minister for Industry and Regional Development; 1996–1998	Succeeded by Cheryl Kernot as Shadow Minister for Regional Development, Infrastructure, Transport and Regional Services
Preceded by Gareth Evans	Deputy Leader of the Opposition of Australia; 1998–2001	Succeeded by Jenny Macklin
Preceded by Gareth Evans	Shadow Treasurer of Australia; 1998–2001	Succeeded by Bob McMullan as Shadow Minister for Treasury, Finance and Small Business
Preceded by Kim Beazley	Leader of the Opposition of Australia; 2001–2003	Succeeded by Mark Latham
Preceded by Mark Latham	Shadow Treasurer of Australia; 2003–2004	Succeeded by Wayne Swan
Preceded by Julia Gillard	Deputy Manager of Opposition Business in the House; 2003–2004	Succeeded by Anthony Albanese
Preceded by Stephen Conroy as Shadow Minister for Trade, Corporate Governance and Financial Services	Shadow Minister for Trade; 2004–2005	Succeeded by Kevin Rudd
Preceded by Kelvin Thomson as Shadow Minister for Regional Development, Roads and Housing and Urban Development	Shadow Minister for Regional Development; 2005–2006	Succeeded by Himelf as Shadow Minister for Trade and Regional Development
Preceded by Kevin Rudd as Shadow Minister for Trade	Shadow Minister for Trade and Regional Development; 2006–2007	Succeeded by Ian Macfarlane as Shadow Minister for Trade
Preceded by Himelf as Shadow Minister for Regional Development	Shadow Minister for Trade and Regional Development; 2006–2007	Succeeded by John Cobb as Shadow Minister for Regional Development
Preceded by Warren Truss	Minister for Trade; 2007–2010	Succeeded by Stephen Smith
Preceded by Julia Gillard	Minister for Education; 2010	Succeeded by Peter Garrett as Minister for School Education, Early Childhood and Youth
Preceded by Julia Gillard	Minister for Education; 2010	Succeeded by Chris Evans as Minister for Tertiary Education, Skills, Jobs and Workplace Relations
Preceded by Julia Gillard	Minister for Employment and Workplace Relations; 2010	Succeeded by Chris Evans as Minister for Tertiary Education, Skills, Jobs and Workplace Relations
Preceded by Julia Gillard	Minister for Social Inclusion; 2010	Succeeded by Tanya Plibersek
Preceded by Anthony Albanese	Minister for Regional Australia, Regional Development and Local Government; 2010–2013	Succeeded by Anthony Albanese
Preceded by Peter Garrett as Minister for Environment Protection, Heritage and the Arts	Minister for the Arts; 2010–2013	Succeeded by Tony Burke
Party political offices
Preceded by Gareth Evans	Deputy Leader of the Australian Labor Party; 1998–2001	Succeeded by Jenny Macklin
Preceded by Kim Beazley	Leader of the Australian Labor Party; 2001–2003	Succeeded by Mark Latham
