= Ladder of opportunity =

Australian political catchphrase

The ladder of opportunity is a catchphrase coined by former Australian Opposition Leader Mark Latham to describe the process of social advancement or the elevation to higher social classes of Australian citizens. After defeating Kim Beazley for the role of Leader of the Opposition, Latham coined the political slogan in his first press conference to describe what he stood for as Labor leader and alternative Prime Minister.

The ladder of opportunity was a phase to inspire middle class 'aspirational' Australian voters. Mark Latham recognised that the primary concern of voters was personal economic advancement, and coined an easy-to-understand phrase to capture the minds of the traditional Labor voter.

The phrase would feature prominently in the 2004 federal election; an election that Labor and Latham would go on to lose.
