= Cliff Dolan =

Australian unionist (1920–2000)

Clifford Ormond Dolan AO (23 January 1920 – 7 December 2000) was an Australian unionist. He was President of the Australian Council of Trade Unions from 1980 to 1985.

== Early life ==
Dolan was born in Grafton, New South Wales, and raised in the Sydney suburb of Meadowbank. His father was a council gardener. He attended West Ryde Primary School and Sydney Technical High School. He became an electrician, and rose to become a full-time official of the Electrical Trades Union by 1949; he was elected Federal Secretary in 1960.

He was Senior Vice-President of the Australian Council of Trade Unions 1973-80, and then succeeded Bob Hawke as President after Hawke went into politics. He remained President until 1985, and was succeeded by Simon Crean.

== Honours ==
He was appointed an Officer of the Order of Australia in 1980, "in recognition of service to trade unionism".
