= European Australian Business Council =

Australian nonprofit organization

EABC Infobox
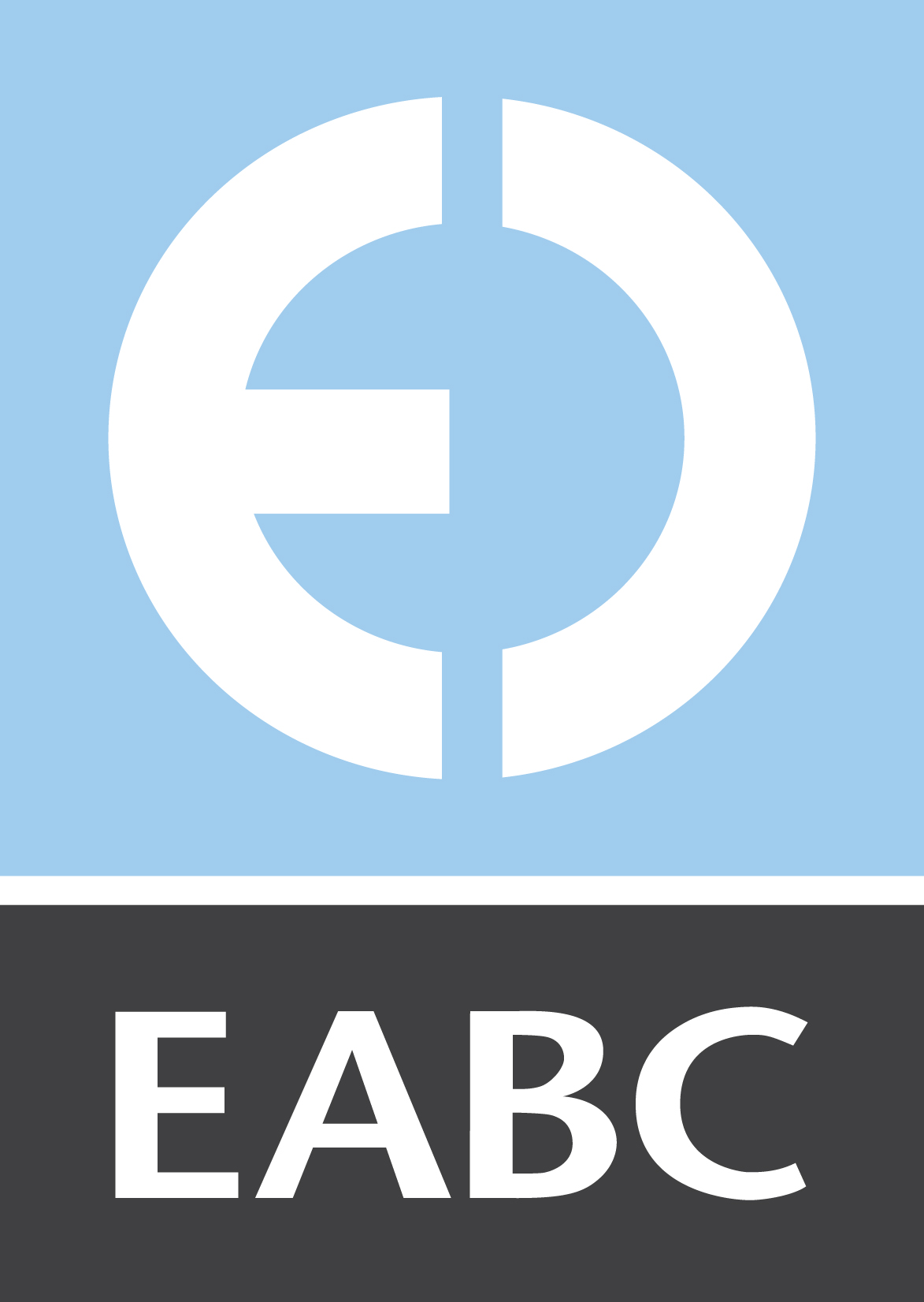
- Formation: 1999; 27 years ago
- Headquarters: Sydney, Australia
- CEO: Jason Collins
- Website: www.eabc.com.au

The European Australian Business Council (EABC) is a nonprofit corporate forum based in Sydney, Australia. The EABC's mission is to promote trade, investment, and institutional cooperation between Australia and Europe by collaborating with governments, public institutions, embassies, consulates, chambers of commerce, trade and investment agencies, and Australian and European business groups.

== Business mission ==
The purpose of the EABC is to foster stronger diplomatic and economic relations between Europe and Australia.

The policy reform agenda of the EABC seeks to promote further business linkages and collaboration between Australia and Europe across all sectors, particularly where the two economies face common challenges. To achieve this end, the EABC provides a forum for policy discussion and debate through boardroom discussions. EABC boardroom discussions consist of a structured programme of guests speakers and open discussions around topics including trade and investment, innovation, education, energy, climate change, infrastructures, health, financial services, culture, defence & security, cyber-security, education, transports and mobility and the digital economy.

Central to the EABC's mission is the advocacy of an ambitious Free Trade Agreement between Australia and the European Union. In September 2017, the President of the European Commission Jean-Claude Juncker called for an Australia-E.U. Free Trade Agreement to be signed by the end of the current Commission's mandate in July 2019.

The negotiations for a Free Trade Agreement between Australia and the EU were launched in Canberra on 18 June 2018 by the European Trade Commissioner Dr Cecilia Malmström, the Australian Prime Minister Malcolm Turnbull and the Australian Minister for Trade Steven Ciobo.

=== Annual Business Mission ===
The EABC also organises an annual "Business Mission" to Europe as a way of promoting bilateral relations between Australia and the EU. The Mission is led by a delegation of Australian Ministers, public officials and business leaders, who meet and engage with European leaders, institutions, officials, business groups and policy organisations in three to four major European cities.

Previous leaders of the annual business mission include Australian Minister for Finance Mathias Cormann, former Australian Governor-General Dame Quentin Bryce, and former Australian Trade and Investment Minister Andrew Robb.

In July 2018, the EABC Business Mission visited Paris, Strasbourg, Madrid, Lisbon and London. The Mission was supported by the Australian Governor-General, Sir Peter Cosgrove. In July 2019, the EABC took a delegation to Berlin, Frankfurt, Brussels, Copenhagen, Malmö and London. In Germany, the delegation was led by Minister Mathias Cormann, and the EABC participated in the inaugural Joint Economic Committee meeting with German Minister Peter Altmaier.

== See also ==
- Australia-European Union relations
- European Union
- Department of Foreign Affairs and Trade
- Austrade
- European Single Market
- Free trade area
- World Trade Organisation
- Brexit
