= 2001 Australian Labor Party leadership election =

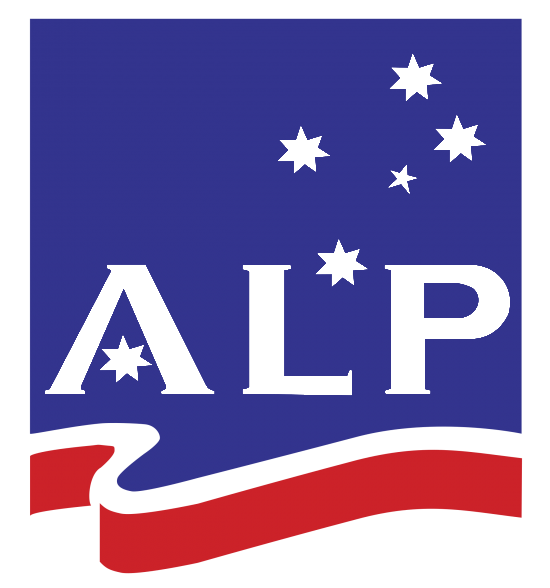
- 22 November 2001
- Leadership election
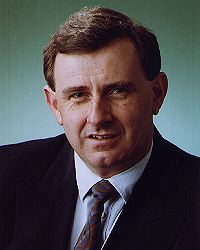
Candidate	Simon Crean
Caucus vote	Unopposed
Seat	Hotham (VIC)
Faction	Right
Leader before election
Kim Beazley
Elected Leader
Simon Crean
- Deputy leadership election
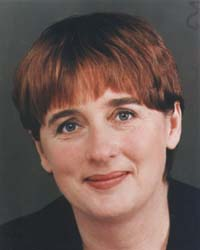
Candidate	Jenny Macklin
Caucus vote	Unopposed
Seat	Jagajaga (VIC)
Faction	Left
Deputy Leader before election
Simon Crean
Deputy Leader
after election
Jenny Macklin

The Australian Labor Party held a leadership election on 22 November 2001, following the resignation of Kim Beazley after the party's defeat at the 2001 federal election. Deputy leader and Shadow Treasurer Simon Crean was elected unopposed as Beazley's replacement, thus becoming Leader of the Opposition.

== Background ==
Beazley, the party's leader since 1996, announced his resignation on the night of 10 November 2001, when it became clear that his party had lost the election to John Howard's Coalition. The following day, Crean announced that he would contest the leadership. Shadow Health Minister Jenny Macklin, Shadow Finance Minister Lindsay Tanner, Shadow Industry Minister Carmen Lawrence, and Manager of Opposition Business Bob McMullan were also seen as possible contenders. On 12 November, Macklin announced her intention to stand for the deputy leadership. She and Crean were reported to be running as a ticket, representing the Labor Left and Labor Right factions, respectively. No other MPs declared themselves candidates for either position over the following week, and Crean and Macklin were consequently elected unopposed when the Labor caucus met on 22 November. Macklin became the first woman to hold a leadership position in the Labor Party.

== Candidates ==
- Simon Crean, incumbent Deputy Leader, Shadow Treasurer, Member for Hotham

== Potential candidates who declined to run ==
- Carmen Lawrence, Shadow Minister for Industry, Innovation and Technology, Member for Fremantle
- Jenny Macklin, Shadow Minister for Health, Member for Jagajaga
- Bob McMullan, Manager of Opposition Business in the House, Shadow Minister for Aboriginal and Torres Strait Islander Affairs, Member for Fraser
- Lindsay Tanner, Shadow Minister for Finance, Member for Melbourne

== Aftermath ==
Crean struggled in the polls against Howard and by mid 2003 moves were being made to replace Crean with Beazley.

After surviving a spill in June, Crean was forced to resign in December with Mark Latham narrowly defeating Beazley.

== See also ==
- Shadow Cabinet of Simon Crean
