= Mark Latham =

Australian politician (born 1961)

The Honourable Mark Latham MLC
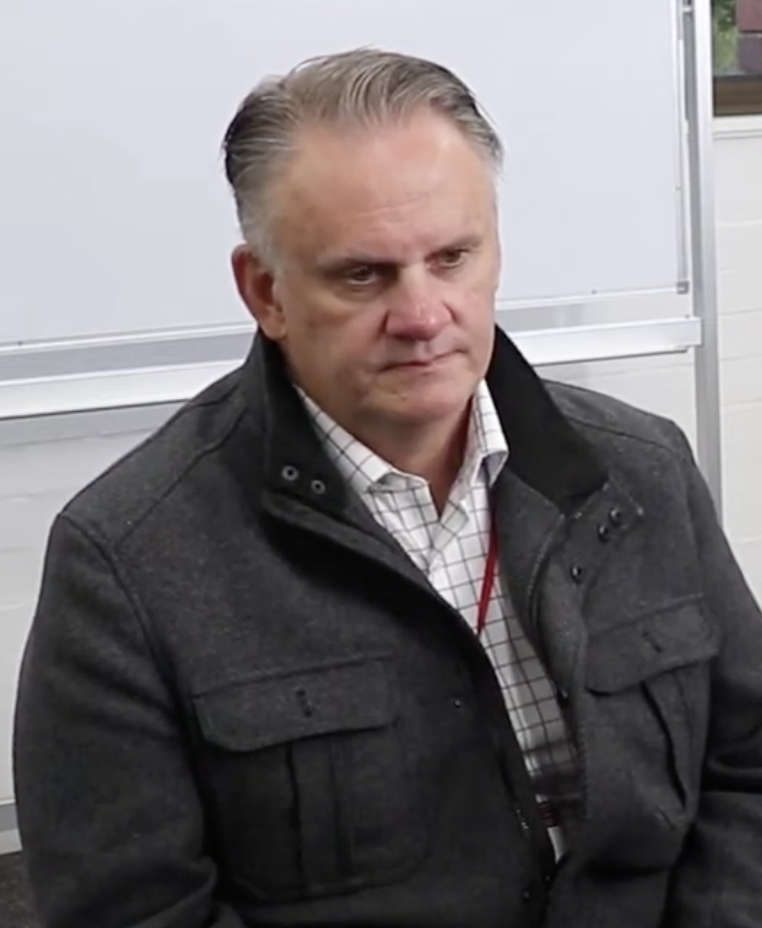
- Latham in 2017

Member of the New South Wales Legislative Council
- Incumbent
- Assumed office 25 March 2023
- In office 23 March 2019 – 2 March 2023
- Succeeded by: Tania Mihailuk

Leader of One Nation New South Wales
- In office 7 November 2018 – 14 August 2023
- Preceded by: Brian Burston
- Succeeded by: Tania Mihailuk

Member of the Australian Parliament for Werriwa
- In office 29 January 1994 – 21 January 2005
- Preceded by: John Kerin
- Succeeded by: Chris Hayes

Leader of the Opposition
- In office 2 December 2003 – 18 January 2005
- Prime Minister: John Howard
- Deputy: Jenny Macklin
- Preceded by: Simon Crean
- Succeeded by: Kim Beazley

Leader of the Australian Labor Party
- In office 2 December 2003 – 18 January 2005
- Deputy: Jenny Macklin
- Preceded by: Simon Crean
- Succeeded by: Kim Beazley

Manager of Opposition Business
- In office 16 June 2003 – 8 December 2003
- Leader: Simon Crean
- Preceded by: Wayne Swan
- Succeeded by: Julia Gillard
Local government
Mayor of Liverpool
In office 1991–1994
Preceded by	Colin Harrington
Succeeded by	George Paciullo
Alderman of the City of Liverpool for South Ward
In office 1991–1994
Alderman of the City of Liverpool for East Ward
In office 1987–1991

Personal details
- Born: 28 February 1961 (age 65) Ashcroft, New South Wales, Australia
- Party: Independent (since 2023)
- Other political affiliations: One Nation (2018–2023); Liberal Democrats (2017–2018); Labor (1979–2017)
- Spouses: Gabrielle Gwyther (m. 1991; div. 1999) Janine Lacey (m. 2000; div. 2022)
- Children: 3
- Education: University of Sydney (BEc)

Mark William Latham (/ˈleɪθəm/; born 28 February 1961) is an Australian politician and media commentator who is a member of the New South Wales Legislative Council. He previously served as the leader of the Australian Labor Party (ALP) and leader of the opposition from December 2003 to January 2005, leading the party to defeat at the 2004 federal election. He left the ALP in 2017 and joined Pauline Hanson's One Nation in 2018, gaining a seat for that party in the New South Wales Legislative Council at the 2019 New South Wales state election and winning re-election in 2023, then quitting the party a few months later.

Latham was born in Sydney and studied economics at the University of Sydney. He joined the Labor Party at a young age and worked as a research assistant to Gough Whitlam and Bob Carr. He was elected to the Liverpool City Council in 1987 and became mayor in 1991. Latham entered the House of Representatives by winning the seat of Werriwa at the 1994 Werriwa by-election. He was included in Labor's shadow cabinet after the 1996 federal election, but left the frontbench in 1998 following a dispute with the party leader, Kim Beazley. He returned to the shadow cabinet in 2001, when Simon Crean became leader.

Latham became leader of the Labor Party in December 2003, narrowly defeating Beazley in a leadership vote after Crean's resignation. He was the youngest leader of the party since Chris Watson in 1901. At the 2004 federal election, the ALP lost five seats and reduced its share of the two-party-preferred vote; the incumbent Howard government was re-elected to a fourth term. Latham became disillusioned with politics and retired in January 2005. After leaving politics, he published a memoir, The Latham Diaries, in which he attacked his former colleagues and condemned the state of political life in Australia.

After leaving parliament, Latham started a career as a prominent political and social commentator, and became highly critical of the Labor Party and left-wing politics. He soon gained a reputation for making inflammatory and controversial comments. In December 2016, he began co-hosting Outsiders on Sky News Live, but he was fired from the network in March 2017 after he made insulting comments about a fellow presenter and the teenage daughter of a governor of the Reserve Bank of Australia. Latham returned to politics and joined the Liberal Democratic Party in May 2017, which led to him receiving a lifetime ban from the Labor Party. In November 2018, Latham left the Liberal Democrats and announced that he had joined One Nation as its state leader in New South Wales. He successfully stood for One Nation in the upper house at the 2019 state election. He resigned in the middle of his eight-year term on 2 March 2023 in order to run for a new eight-year term at the state election later that month.

In August 2023, One Nation federal leader Pauline Hanson announced Latham had been removed as leader of the party's New South Wales division. Shortly thereafter Latham resigned from One Nation to sit as an independent. Beginning in 2023, Latham was involved in a legal dispute with MP Alex Greenwich about an offensive tweet.

== Early career ==
Latham was born on 28 February 1961 in Ashcroft, a suburb of south-western Sydney in New South Wales. He was educated at Hurlstone Public School; then Hurlstone Agricultural High School, where he was dux; and at the University of Sydney, where he graduated with a Bachelor of Economics with Honours in 1982. While he was a student, Latham worked at the Green Valley Hotel for 2 years. He also worked as an adviser to Labor politician John Kerin from 1980 to 1982. After completing his degree, Latham worked as a research assistant to the former Labor prime minister Gough Whitlam from 1982 to 1987, which included working on the latter's book The Whitlam Government, and then as an adviser to then-Leader of the New South Wales Opposition Bob Carr from 1988 to 1991.

In 1987, he was elected to the Liverpool City Council, in Sydney's south-west, and was mayor from 1991 to 1994. Latham played rugby union with the Liverpool Bulls club and had a stint as its president. He has also been a fan of St George Dragons rugby league club since 1968.

Latham's term as mayor saw radical changes introduced to the council, with large spending on public works, to be paid for by a combination of loans and efficiencies achieved from outsourcing many council services.

In an article in Quarterly Essay, journalist Margaret Simons, who conducted an extensive investigation of the period, concluded that there were real issues in the financial management of the council. These mostly related to the drafting of the outsourcing agreements. Simons also said most of the allegations come from council members who were sacked for incompetence by the state government.

On 1 June 2004, Latham told Parliament that during his time as mayor he had reduced Liverpool's debt service ratio from 17 to 10 percent, which he said was less than half of western Sydney's average. He also said Liverpool had adopted a debt retirement strategy that he claimed would have made it debt free by 2005, but it was not implemented by his successors.

== Labor member of Parliament ==
In January 1994, Latham was elected at a by-election to the House of Representatives for the Sydney seat of Werriwa, which had been Gough Whitlam's seat from 1952 to 1978. He was elected to the Opposition front bench after Labor lost the 1996 election, and became shadow minister for education. After the 1998 election he resigned from the front bench following a policy dispute with the opposition leader, Kim Beazley. The two became political enemies following this incident.

The views expressed in Civilising Global Capital (see below) alienated him from many Labor traditionalists, but his aggressive parliamentary style (resembling that of Keating) won him many admirers. He once referred to Prime Minister John Howard as an "arselicker" and to the Liberal Party frontbench as a "conga line of suckholes". He also described U.S. President George W. Bush as "the most incompetent and dangerous president in living memory".

On politics, Latham commented in 2002:

I'm a hater. Part of the tribalness of politics is to really dislike the other side with intensity. And the more I see of them the more I hate them. I hate their negativity. I hate their narrowness. I hate the way, for instance, John Howard tries to appeal to suburban values when I know that he hasn't got any real answers to the problems and challenges we face. I hate the phoniness of that.

== Leader of the Opposition (2003–2005) ==
Latham was a strong supporter of Kim Beazley's successor Simon Crean, defending the leader against his critics within the party. He called Crean's principal frontbench detractors, Stephen Smith, Stephen Conroy and Wayne Swan "the three roosters". When Crean resigned the Labor leadership, Latham contested the ballot for leader against Beazley. On 2 December 2003, Latham won the vote for the leadership by 47 votes to 45. Kevin Rudd and Julia Gillard were early contenders for the leadership, but both withdrew in favour of Beazley and Latham respectively. At age 42, Latham became the youngest leader of the federal parliamentary Labor Party since its first leader Chris Watson, who became leader at age 33 in 1901. In his first press conference as leader, Latham championed his belief in a "ladder of opportunity" that would bring prosperity to all Australians.

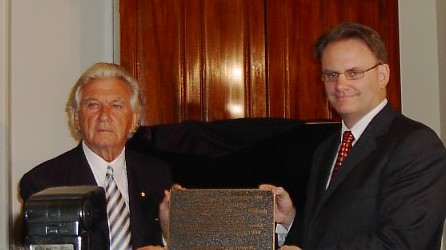
Latham with former Prime Minister Bob Hawke, unveiling a plaque to commemorate the centenary of the first Australian federal Labor government, Melbourne, April 2004

The Howard government targeted Latham's brash personality and his colourful past. Howard characterised him as "Mr Flip-Flop". Peter Costello attempted to damage Latham's economic credentials by referring to the experimental economic ideas that he had put forward as shadow treasurer, such as abolishing negative gearing and replacing the GST with a Progressive Expenditure Tax. Frequent references were made to Latham's temper; he was alleged to have broken a taxi-driver's arm in a scuffle arising from a fare dispute.

On winning the leadership, Latham appointed his predecessor, Simon Crean, as shadow treasurer, while also retaining a number of Kim Beazley's supporters in senior positions. In July 2004, Beazley himself was re-elected to the ALP front bench as Shadow Minister for Defence.

In January 2004, the Labor Party national conference was held in Sydney. During the conference, Latham received very positive media coverage and introduced his plans for early childhood literacy. As leader, he chose to focus on "values" issues, such as early childhood policy, education and health reform, and economic relief for middle-class Australia, which he termed with the political slogan "ease the squeeze".

In March, following the Spanish election at which the pro-Bush administration People's Party government was defeated, Latham sparked a new controversy by committing a Labor government to withdrawing Australian troops from Iraq by Christmas. At that time, Australia had about 850 troops in Iraq, mostly involved in patrol work and in training members of the new Iraqi defence forces. Howard accused Latham of a "cut and run" approach and said "it's not the Australian way not to stay the distance".

=== 2004 federal election campaign ===
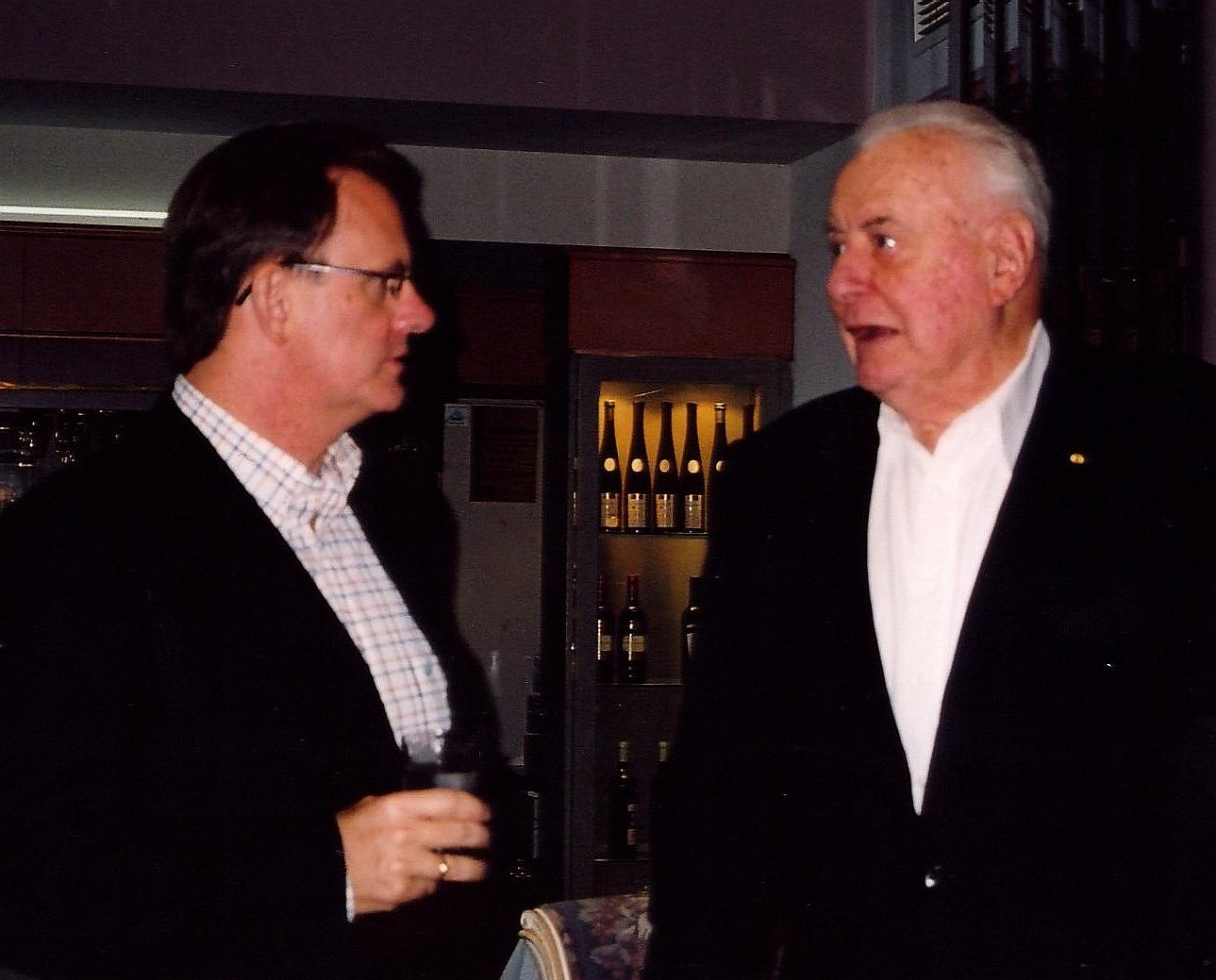
Latham with mentor, former Prime Minister Gough Whitlam, at an election fundraiser in Melbourne, September 2004

Until March 2004, Labor under Latham's leadership held a strong lead in national opinion polls. Latham's commitment to withdraw from Iraq was seen as divisive, and potentially harmful to his chances of electoral success. During the campaign, Latham was accused of "flip-flopping" between being supportive and critical of the Iraq war, in an attempt to appease both the U.S. government, as well as more moderate voters.

In June 2004, Labor's "troops home by Christmas" policy came under fire from U.S. President George W. Bush who, at a White House press conference during Howard's visit to Washington DC, described it as "disastrous".

Shortly afterwards, Latham announced the recruitment of Peter Garrett, president of the Australian Conservation Foundation and former lead singer with the rock band Midnight Oil, as a Labor candidate in Kingsford Smith, a safe Sydney electorate being vacated by the retiring former minister Laurie Brereton. Garrett revealed that he had been approached months before by senior ALP figures, including John Faulkner and Kim Beazley, and had taken this long to make up his mind.

The second coup scored by Latham was the announcement that he would abolish the generous superannuation schemes available to members of parliament; his plan was quickly adopted by the Howard government in the face of a rising wave of public support with the support of his mentor former Prime Minister Gough Whitlam, the former member for Werriwa.

Other announced policies and initiatives included: the introduction of federal government parenting classes for those parents deemed to be failing to adequately discipline their children; a ban on food and drink advertising during children's television viewing hours; the introduction of a national youth mentoring program; the government distribution of free story books to the families of newborn children; a federal ban on plastic shopping bags; and the introduction of legislation to prohibit vilification on the basis of religious beliefs or sexual orientation, similar to laws adopted in the state of Victoria that some critics said had led to a restriction of free speech. Some of these initiatives prompted Howard to criticise Latham as a "behavioural policeman".

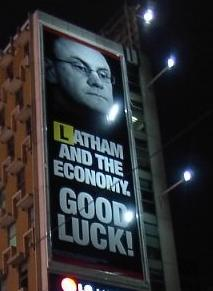
The Liberal-National coalition focused heavily on Latham's inexperience during the campaign (in Australia, yellow "L-plates" are attached to cars driven by learner drivers).

In July 2004, Latham again became the centre of controversy when it was alleged on a commercial television network that he had punched a political rival during his time on Liverpool Council, though Latham denied such events happening, calling the claim 'ridiculous, untrue and unbelievable", whilst accusing the Government of running a 'smear campaign'. On 6 July 2004, he called a press conference and denounced the government for maintaining what he called a "dirt unit," which he said was gathering personal material about him, including details of his first marriage. The government denied that any such unit existed, but some observers speculated that Liberal Party researchers had accumulated more potentially embarrassing material about Latham, which would be used during the election campaign (a threat which never eventuated), in addition to claims that Latham was an inexperienced economic manager.

Between March and August, both Latham's and Labor's position in the opinion polls gradually declined, with John Howard being the preferred prime minister by 17 points over Latham in July. During August, Labor claimed a tactical victory over the government on the issue of the Australia – United States Free Trade Agreement and there were allegations in a Senate inquiry that Howard had lied about the "Children Overboard Affair" during the 2001 election campaign. By mid-August, Labor was again ahead in all three national opinion polls.

=== Electoral defeat and aftermath ===
The election was held on 9 October 2004. Although opinion polls showed the ALP leading the government at various stages of the six-week campaign, the government was re-elected with an increased majority. This was despite Latham being generally credited with a strong performance and a victory in the sole campaign debate.

Among those critical of Latham were journalists Tom Allard and Mark Metherell, who said "the flurry of releases meant Mr Latham went off message from Labor's core strengths of health and education." Labor's party president, Carmen Lawrence, blamed the unexpected severity of the defeat on an effective Coalition "scare campaign" focused on Latham's limited economic management experience.

Gartrell also apparently failed to anticipate the interest rates scare campaign. The inability of his campaign to counter the Liberal campaign would later be cited by Latham himself, in the Latham Diaries, as a key reason for the election loss. Latham wrote that he had told his wife Janine that "I've tried to carry the whole show on my shoulders: my family, my community, my party. But now I'm stuffed. I have collapsed under the weight of those fucking ads". Michael Costello, a former chief of staff to Kim Beazley, said: "This is a complete train wreck. We now face at least two terms before we can win government again. We face at least three years with John Howard pretty much in control of the Senate."

On the morning of 8 October, the day before the election, a television crew filmed Latham and Howard shaking hands as they crossed paths outside an Australian Broadcasting Corporation radio studio in Sydney. The footage showed Latham appearing to draw Howard towards him and tower over his shorter opponent. The incident received wide media coverage and, while Latham claimed to have been attempting to get revenge for Howard squeezing his wife's hand too hard at a press function, it was variously reported as being "aggressive", "bullying" and "intimidating" on the part of Latham. The Liberal Party campaign director, Brian Loughnane, later said this incident generated more feedback to Liberal headquarters than anything else during the six-week campaign, and that it "brought together all the doubts and hesitations that people had about Mark Latham". Latham disputes the impact of this incident, however, having described it as a "Tory gee-up: we got close to each other, sure, but otherwise it was a regulation man's handshake. It's silly to say it cost us votes – my numbers spiked in the last night of our polling." According to Latham's account of events, Latham came in close to Howard for the handshake to prevent Howard shaking with his arm rather than his wrist.

Latham became the first Labor opposition leader since Frank Tudor in 1917 to fail to make a net gain in seats from the government at his first election. Some commentators, including Kim Beazley, said Latham's leadership had rescued Labor from a much heavier defeat. Beazley said polling a year before the election indicated the ALP would lose "25–30 seats" in the House of Representatives. Instead the party lost a net four seats in the lower house, a swing of 0.21% and there was a 1.1% swing to the ALP in the Senate.

=== Leadership tensions ===
Labor's defeat led to media criticisms of Latham's personal style and policy priorities, and also to a crisis in confidence in his leadership within the Labor caucus. Several prominent members of the front-bench, notably John Faulkner, Lindsay Tanner and Bob McMullan, chose not to recontest front-bench positions. McMullan made it clear he was unhappy with Latham's leadership style and gave an interview suggesting there would be a leadership challenge early in 2005. The national secretary of the Australian Workers' Union, Bill Shorten, was also highly critical of Latham.

In December, after Latham was incorrectly reported to have blamed Labor's state premiers for the defeat, an unnamed Labor frontbencher predicted a leadership challenge within the next few months, saying Latham's supporters had lost confidence in him. Latham also had a heated public confrontation with the Labor deputy leader in the Senate, Stephen Conroy, renewing speculation there would be a challenge to Latham's leadership in the new year.

Latham was helped by the fact that there was no obvious successor to the leadership. The most likely candidates, Kevin Rudd, Wayne Swan and Stephen Smith, accepted senior positions on Latham's frontbench and pledged loyalty to him. The leaders of the Socialist Left faction, and the centre-left under Martin Ferguson and Julia Gillard, also maintained their support for him. There was little support for a return to Beazley, and neither Tanner nor McMullan were seen as viable leadership candidates. In the longer run, however, many commentators doubted Latham would survive until the 2007 election after such a heavy defeat.

The final crisis for Latham's leadership erupted in the aftermath of the December 2004 Indian Ocean earthquake and tsunami. With both Latham and his deputy leader, Jenny Macklin, on leave, the acting opposition leader, Senator Chris Evans, issued statements in the aftermath of the tsunami. Latham was criticised for not issuing a statement as leader personally, particularly at a time when John Howard expressed national sympathy over the disaster, pledged $1 billion in loans to Indonesia and declared a national day of mourning. Latham rejected the criticism of his non-appearance after the tragedy, saying "none of my verbiage could make any practical difference – bring back the dead, reverse the waves, organise the relief effort". Macklin issued a statement on the disaster on 30 December before also choosing to take leave.

Opinion polls in January showed a sharp decline in Latham's support and a preference for the return of Beazley as Labor leader.

=== Departure from politics ===
On 18 January 2005, citing life-threatening illness and family concerns, Latham announced his resignation from the Labor Party leadership and from Parliament. He strongly criticised the media for invading his family's privacy during his illness. Latham had been federal Labor leader for 13 months, the shortest tenure since Billy Hughes was expelled from the party in 1916. Latham was only the second federal Labor leader, after Matthew Charlton in 1928, to leave politics without ever having held ministerial office.

Political journalist Mungo MacCallum wrote:

Latham became leader too early in his career, he lacked the skills needed to deal with the webs of intrigue within his own party, he refused to massage the media and the advisers he did listen to were out of their depth against Howard's praetorian guard. But he had many qualities that were not only desirable and attractive but are in short supply in today's ALP. In other circumstances he could have developed into a formidable leader, even prime minister. As it is, he remains one of the great what-ifs.

== Publications ==
Although Latham wrote Civilising Global Capital while he was an MP, most of his works have been written after his federal parliamentary career.

=== Civilising Global Capital ===
While on the backbench of Parliament in the late 1990s, Latham published Civilising Global Capital: New Thinking for Australian Labor (Allen and Unwin, 1998), in which he argued that Labor needed to abandon many of its traditional policies and embrace the aspirational values (home ownership, higher education) of the upwardly-mobile skilled working class and small business class. His policies as the leader of the Labor Party were largely derived from the stance taken in this book, which ideologically is described as "the third way".

=== Biography ===
Latham's biography Loner: Inside a Labor Tragedy, by Bernard Lagan, was launched on 29 June 2005 by Senator John Faulkner, published by Allen & Unwin. The book caused furore within Labor ranks. Most of this was due to material contained within a single email written by Latham in the last page of the book. Of Kim Beazley's return to the leadership, Latham said: "Labor got the leader it truly deserves – it is well suited to a conservative stand-for-nothing type of leader." Latham also criticised state Labor premiers Bob Carr, Peter Beattie and Geoff Gallop, calling them "A-grade arseholes." Union leader Bill Shorten remarked that Latham had displayed "all the attributes of a dog except loyalty."

Of his election loss, Latham wrote:

I had my shot at being prime minister. It didn't work out on several fronts. But life goes on, potentially in a splendid way, spending so much time with my family. After suffering testicular cancer, the greatest gift in my life has been the ability to have children with Janine. I would be a fool to waste it.

=== The Latham Diaries ===
Soon after his retirement, Latham announced his decision to publish a selection of diary entries spanning almost a decade. Following a bidding war, it was announced that Melbourne University Press (MUP) would publish the Diaries in late September. MUP later awarded the exclusivity rights for extracts to News Ltd and the exclusivity for the first interview to the ABC television program Enough Rope, which was due to be broadcast at 9.30 pm on Monday 19 September 2005.

Meanwhile, excerpts of the Diaries were published by The Australian from 15 September ahead of their publication in book form on 19 September. The excerpts published include attacks by Latham on the ALP, his successor Kim Beazley, frontbencher Kevin Rudd and former Labor prime ministers Paul Keating and Gough Whitlam.

Due to the publicity the Diaries were now generating, the extensive amount of published extracts, and concerns that Latham had recorded other interviews, in particular with another ABC program, Lateline, Enough Rope pushed to have the interview broadcast four days early on Thursday 15 September at 8.30 pm with a simultaneous broadcast on some ABC radio stations. However, when the time came to broadcast, the ABC announced that the interview would not be shown due to a legal injunction sought by News Limited (owner of The Australian), which had the rights to publish extracts from the Diaries. Reports on the night said any broadcast by the ABC was a breach of confidentiality between News and the book's publisher, MUP, the newspaper publisher having signed to an A$80,000 deal to publish excerpts of the book in the weekend newspapers. However, at 10.30 pm, the ABC aired the Denton interview after the Supreme Court of New South Wales lifted the injunction. Justice Harry Palmer said the publication of large parts of the book in News Limited newspapers largely destroyed the value of the material. Due to the last-minute changes, the edition of ABC's Lateline program scheduled for 10.30 pm featuring another interview with Latham (also subject to the short-lived injunction) was aired the following night.

The Diaries represent a remarkable and unprecedented statement by a former leader of a major political party. In the book, Latham is scathing about Australia's political system:

It takes committed people ... and turns them into one-dimensional robots ... The only good news is that the public is on to them. The electorate has worked out the artificiality of it all. They can see through the spin doctors, the publicity stunts, the polling and the tricks of marginal-seat campaigning. This is why people now talk about politics with a cool anger. They have a clear feeling that the system is far from genuine. That the robots, in fact, are tin men.

=== A Conga Line of Suckholes ===
Latham's seventh book, a collection of quotations titled A Conga Line of Suckholes, was released by Melbourne University Publishing in late September 2006.

=== "No Exit The ALP" ===
In November 2010, Latham contributed an essay in The Monthly titled "No Exit The ALP". In it, Latham again criticised the ALP, writing that "for all the heightened rhetoric, for the seemingly endless creation of summits, committees and policy review processes, the lasting impression from the Rudd years is one of emptiness". He also remarked that "Without a guiding philosophy of politics, Rudd's prime ministership was an exercise in populism. He avoided tough decisions and mastered the art of media manipulation as a way of extending his honeymoon". Latham concludes that Labor had "lost its way". His suggested solution is that Labor again champions great causes, writing that:

Having studied the literature and, at one time, been part of these debates, I can identify just three credible ideas that have been advanced for the renewal of the social democratic project. Each seeks to move beyond economic issues, beyond the material realm of politics, to stake out new ground. The first tries to reclaim social capital, the rebuilding of mutualism and community, as a Labor icon. The second positions Labor as an anti-establishment party, breaking down the entrenched centres of power in society. The third champions a crusade on climate change, an uncompromising attempt to roll back the materialism of western society in favour of environmental values.

Latham finishes his essay by writing about the difficulties of each approach.

=== Not Dead Yet: Labor's post-Left future ===
In March 2013 Latham wrote the 49th issue of The Quarterly Essay, exploring how the ALP can adapt to the changing economic status of its traditional working class voting base and arguing that to remain a successful grassroots party the ALP must "clear out the apparatchiks and dead wood."

The essay received correspondence from the now-federal Treasurer Jim Chalmers and now-Assistant Minister for Science, Technology and the Digital Economy Andrew Charlton.

=== Other publications ===
Mark Latham also wrote Reviving Labor's agenda: a program for local reform (Pluto Press / Australian Fabian Society, 1990), What did you learn today?: creating an education revolution (Allen & Unwin, 2001), From the Suburbs: Building a Nation from our Neighbourhoods (Pluto Press Australia, 2003), The Political Bubble: Why Australians Don't Trust Politics (Pan Macmillan, 2014), Latham at Large (Melbourne University Press, 2015), and Taking Back Australia: Saving Our Country, Our Culture, Our Civilisation (Wilkinson Publishing, 2018).

He also wrote a weekly column for the Spectator magazine (Australian edition) entitled "Latham's Law".

== Media commentator ==
=== Melbourne University Lecture ===
Latham gave his first public lecture since the release of the Diaries, titled "Ten Reasons Why Young Idealistic People Should Forget About Organised Politics", on 27 September 2005, at Melbourne University. During the lecture, he argued that organised politics is ineffective at achieving real social change, due to public apathy, the rise of conservatism and the inward-focused structure of the major parties, and instead encouraged youth to focus on more grassroots, community-based programs. He also claimed politics has a detrimental impact on health, happiness and family life, largely blaming the "arrogant" and "incompetent" media, as well as internal party struggles.

=== Incident at Hungry Jack's ===
On 19 January 2006, Latham was eating with his two sons at a Hungry Jack's restaurant in Campbelltown, New South Wales when he was photographed by Ross Schultz, a photographer from The Daily Telegraph. Latham snatched the camera and smashed it, without destroying the electronic media that contained the photographs. The Telegraph subsequently announced plans for upcoming publication of the photographic images in the following Saturday's edition and that it would be seeking $12,000 from Latham to replace the equipment. The following day, Latham appeared to drive towards a Channel 7 television cameraman at his Sydney home. The photographer was unhurt but Seven's head of news in Sydney, Chris Willis, said the footage clearly showed Latham's car veer toward the cameraman as he stood on the side of the road. In February 2006, Latham was charged with assault, malicious damage and theft in relation to the incident. Latham did not appear in Campbelltown Local Court to face the charges, on 22 March, instead giving a lecture to political science students at the Australian National University. When asked by a student how he could blame everyone else but himself, Latham replied: "I'm sorry I didn't come in here and expose myself as a miserable arsewipe." On 26 April, The Sydney Morning Herald reported that Latham again chose not to appear in Campbelltown Local Court in relation to the 19 January incident. The case was adjourned to 24 May. On 6 June, The Sydney Morning Herald reported that Latham escaped having a criminal conviction for malicious damage to the camera being used by Schultz recorded against him, but had been placed on a good behaviour bond for two years. After pleading guilty to malicious damage, he had the charges of assault and theft dropped. He was also required to pay $6,763.70 in compensation for the damaged camera.

The Sun Herald reported on 13 August 2006 that the family were moving from their Glen Alpine home to a property at Mount Hunter, near Camden.

=== 2007 federal election ===
Latham commented on the 2007 federal election campaign with an article in the Australian Financial Review, in which he said Australia was having a "Seinfeld election, a show about nothing". He wrote that, no matter which party won, Australia would have a conservative economic policy and an industrial relations system which was decentralised and productivity-based. He stated that Australian public life had reached the "zenith of policy convergence", and that "Many people in the Labor movement are expecting Labor in power to be far more progressive than its stated election promises. I expect a Labor administration to be even more timid, more conservative".

=== 2010 federal election ===
In 2010, Latham was a guest reporter for television show 60 Minutes, where he reported on the federal election campaign. It was here that during a report he confronted Julia Gillard. Latham pushed his way through the crowd and confronted Gillard and her partner, Tim Mathieson, saying: "I understand you have made a complaint about me working for Channel 9". Gillard replied "I don't know anything about that, Mark. If you want to work with Channel 9, that's a matter for you", before Latham suggested that Kevin Rudd had been behind the leaks against her during the campaign.

During the campaign, Latham attacked Gillard's stance on population growth as "a fraud", arguing that the Gillard government would have to reduce immigration levels if it was serious about easing population pressures in Australia's capital cities.

He also caused a stir when, on 60 Minutes, he urged voters to issue a protest vote by leaving the ballot paper blank on election day:

They say that voting in Australia is compulsory, but it's not compulsory to fill out the ballot paper. You can put it in the ballot box, totally blank. That's what I'll be doing on Saturday and I urge you to do the same. It's the ultimate protest vote.

Following that interview, he continued to attack Gillard as well as journalist Laurie Oakes.

=== 2013 federal election ===
On 14 August 2013, during the election federal campaign, Latham was interviewed by the 3AW radio station in Melbourne. He caused controversy when asked to comment on Liberal Party leader Tony Abbott's characterisation of Fiona Scott, the Liberal candidate for Lindsay, as having "sex appeal". Latham responded:

It showed very bad judgment, it showed that he's got low standards. I've had a good look at Fiona Scott [...] and I don't think she's got sex appeal at all. [... Abbott] must have had the beer goggles on because she's not that good of a sort, and I'd rather have an aspirant for the prime ministership who's a good judge when it comes to checking out the good sorts.

=== Controversy at the Australian Financial Review and Triple M ===
In August 2015, Latham resigned from his regular column after spending eight years with the Australian Financial Review. His resignation was linked to a series of articles critical of Australian of the Year Rosie Batty and also Group Captain Catherine McGregor.

In January 2016, further controversy erupted over Latham's radio podcast on Triple M with comments that he paraphrased from a government report saying "men who have lost their self esteem" turn to domestic violence "as a coping mechanism." Latham referred to Batty (whose son was murdered by his father) as "exploiting her personal tragedy" and "doing more harm than good" by publicising domestic violence against women and children as an epidemic "when the official reports show it at one percent." Batty responded that she hoped "someone like Mark is able to become more informed and (is) not stuck in the, I guess, ignorant position because that type of thinking went out several decades ago...there are still some people unfortunately very influenced and stuck in those (mindsets)."

Triple M is a supporter of White Ribbon Campaign, a charity which is led by men to raise awareness of domestic violence caused by men. Since Latham's podcast was broadcast, there have been widespread calls for White Ribbon to distance itself from Triple M and Latham. The chair of White Ribbon, John Rosewarn, responded that "Mark Latham's views on domestic violence, as aired by Triple M, show his lack of understanding and knowledge of this complex issue, including its prevalence, causes and community response." White Ribbon also tweeted: "Domestic violence is much more than physical violence; it's never a coping mechanism."

=== 2016 US presidential election ===
During the 2016 United States presidential election, Latham announced his support for Republican candidate Donald Trump, stating "Donald is by no means perfect but I much prefer his approach to the lying snakes of machine politics and media manipulation" and praised Trump's pledge to dismantle the Obama administration's deals with Iran.

=== Sky News ===
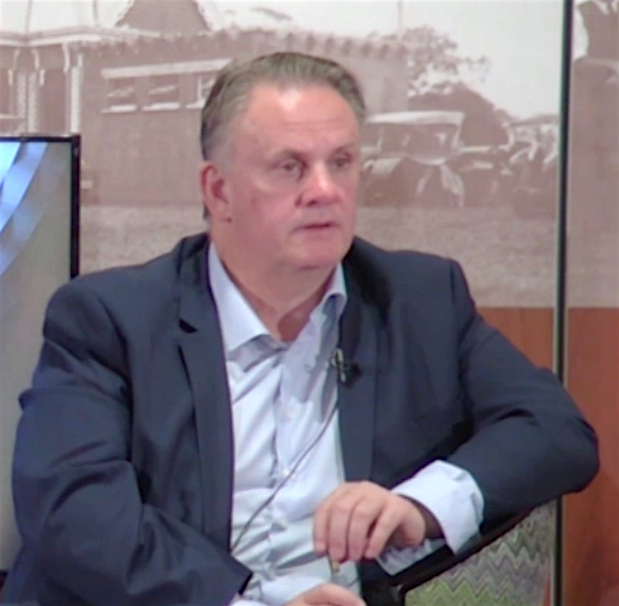
Latham at the 2018 Church and State Summit

In 2016, Latham became co-host of Sky News Live programs Jones + Co and in 2017 co-host of Outsiders.

In a March edition of Outsiders, Latham criticised a lack of diversity among corporate diversity officers and included Sky News colleague Peter van Onselen's wife as an example. Van Onselen and his To The Point co-host Kristina Keneally criticised Latham for the segment. Latham responded by criticising both, including statements implying Keneally acted corruptly in her former position as Premier of New South Wales. Keneally threatened to take defamation action and made a formal complaint to Sky News management. In a separate incident, ABC Radio Sydney presenter Wendy Harmer threatened legal action after Latham made numerous statements criticising her, including the claim Harmer was only employed by the ABC because she is a female with a disability. Consequently, Sky News released a public statement rejecting Latham's "comments in their entirety" and apologised "unreservedly" to both Harmer and Keneally.

A third controversy related to Latham questioning the sexuality of a school student during an Outsiders segment criticising a video put out by Sydney Boys High School in support of International Women's Day and suggested he "thought that first guy was gay", referring to a student in the video. Latham was fired from Sky News on 29 March 2017 after the story was published.

Latham later defended himself saying that a lot of journalists who discussed the comments had not seen the show:

That video was put out there to deliberately confuse people, because the young people were using the words of women and the first fellow up was talking about sex with a man - so it became clear later on what the sort of trick was, but they put it up there for public discussion, we had a discussion about it on the show. No offence was meant, none should have been taken. It really is appalling that people who complained about nothing at the time all of a sudden get worked up later on...

In April 2017, Latham launched a website called Mark Latham's Outsiders and hosted a weekly Facebook Live program. Despite sharing the same name, it is unrelated to the Sky News program Outsiders which has continued without him as host.

In the same month, Latham created a video titled What's Gone Wrong With Australian Multiculturalism: Ethnic Enclaves in Fairfield, where he was subsequently criticised by the leaders of Fairfield for describing the deficiency of English in the area as "disgraceful". In the video, he tried to interview the residents of Fairfield, most of whom refused to speak due to a language barrier. Also in the video, Latham postulated that the ethnic enclave in Fairfield and Cabramatta signaled multiculturalism was failing as the West Asian-descent people in Fairfield did not want to visit Cabramatta, a suburb with a large East Asian population. Assyrian Resource Centre manager Carmen Lazar rebutted Latham, saying many programs in Fairfield aid refugees to learn English, such as Navitas Limited.

Latham previously said he was a supporter of same-sex marriage. However, in 2017 during the Australian Marriage Law Postal Survey he endorsed the 'no' vote, saying that a 'yes' vote "will open a can of worms".

== Return to politics ==
=== Liberal Democrats (2017–2018) ===
In May 2017, Latham announced via his Facebook page that he would be joining the Liberal Democrats, a libertarian party. The Labor Party responded by placing a life ban on Latham from ever re-joining the party, after a motion was passed by the New South Wales branch of the Labor Party. According to Latham, he had terminated his ALP membership in March 2017 after being refused permission to address a party gathering.

In January 2018, Latham launched a Save Australia Day campaign with help from Aboriginal politician Jacinta Price in response to the #ChangeTheDate social media campaign which called for the date of Australia Day to be moved or for the holiday to be abolished entirely. Latham argued "Changing the date will not change the circumstances of any disadvantaged Indigenous people" and "if the Left succeeds in moving or abolishing Australia Day, there is nothing about Australia that will be safe into the future".

Latham announced that he was open to running as a candidate for the Liberal Democrats in future elections. However, he was blocked by the party executive from running as a candidate and, as a result, resigned his party membership in September 2018.

=== One Nation (2018–2023) ===
In November 2018, Latham announced that he had joined One Nation as the party's state leader in New South Wales, and would stand for the Legislative Council at the 2019 state election. In response, Luke Foley, the state ALP leader, ruled out recommending preferences to One Nation candidates. Latham ran on a platform which opposed immigration, congestion, overdevelopment and renewable power, and proposed DNA tests for Aboriginal welfare recipients and banning the burqa in government buildings, banks, and airports. Latham supported a travel ban on certain Islamic countries, saying, "If you know that there's a country that's producing a lot of troublemakers, would-be terrorists, radical jihadists coming to Australia, what sort of sane nation would say, 'Bring 'em in!' If you know there's a nation that's no good for us, then turn off the tap."

Latham was successful in his bid to return to parliament, winning an eight-year term in the Legislative Council alongside Rod Roberts. Latham's maiden speech to the state parliament focused on criticising "leftist elites", maintaining the values of Western civilisation, the importance of education and the right to freedom of speech, as exemplified in the recent Israel Folau controversy.

In 2019, Latham was a keynote speaker at the inaugural Conservative Political Action Conference (CPAC) in Australia, alongside former prime minister Tony Abbott and British politician Nigel Farage.

Since 2020, Latham has promoted a bill titled "Parental Rights" which seeks to prohibit teachers from discussing "the ideology of gender fluidity to children in schools".

In 2021, Latham moved a motion to pull Bruce Pascoe's book Dark Emu from the New South Wales school curriculum. One Nation, Fred Nile and the Shooters, Fishers and Farmers Party voted for it, while the Liberal Party, the National Party, Labor and the Greens voted down the motion.

In October 2022, Latham announced his plan to quit the Legislative Council just before the 2023 New South Wales state election and to run again on the top of the One Nation ticket. The plan was designed to increase the numbers of One Nation in the Legislative Council from two to four after the election. He resigned from the Legislative Council on 2 March 2023 and was re-elected 23 days later. His seat was filled by Tania Mihailuk.

Following an intervention from the federal branch of One Nation, Latham was removed from the position of state leader of One Nation in New South Wales. Hanson cited the party's worse than expected 14% drop in vote at the New South Wales state election in March. No member has replaced Latham as leader of the NSW One Nation branch. Latham denounced this decision, declaring that Hanson should "buy a mirror" as her own vote share had decreased at the previous federal election, and that she had stacked the NSW state executive with interstate residents. Latham's colleagues split over the issue; Roberts supported his position by denouncing several members of the new executive as unqualified, while Mihaluk remained silent and was seen as being supportive of Hanson's decision. On 22 August 2023, Latham and Roberts resigned from One Nation to sit as independents.

=== Legal dispute with Alex Greenwich ===
In March 2023, gay MP, Alex Greenwich called Latham "a disgusting human being", in response to pro-LGBT protesters being attacked outside a church in which Latham was delivering a speech regarding "religious freedom, parental rights, school education and protecting [non-government] schools from Alphabet Activism". In reply, Latham wrote a tweet suggesting that anal sex between men was "disgusting", in terms that were universally described as offensive and inflammatory. The comments were deemed to be homophobic by Greenwich and other politicians, and received significant backlash, even from within his own party as Pauline Hanson criticised Latham and called for him to apologise. Latham later deleted the tweet, but refused to apologise.

On 11 September 2024, Judge David O'Callaghan of the Federal Court ruled that the tweet was defamatory because it made Greenwich out to be a person that "engages in disgusting sexual activities". He rejected Latham's defences, a statutory defence of honest opinion and a common law defence of qualified privilege, right of reply to attack. Greenwich also claimed that the tweet conveyed that Greenwich was not a fit and proper person to be a member of the New South Wales Parliament, however, the judge found that allegation not proven. The court awarded Greenwich $140,000 in damages. Greenwich praised the judgement, saying "It gives me confidence that we've established some case law here that can protect other LGBTQ people", and that "The strength of this judgment is that it is made clear that this Trump-style political attack on your opponents based on their sexuality, based on whatever you want to attack them for, has no place in the Australian public political discourse". Latham appealed the judgment but lost.

In April 2026, NSW Civil and Administrative Tribunal (NCAT) found Latham to have subjected Greenwich to homosexual vilification and sexual harassment. NCAT required Latham to pay Greenwich $100,000, to delete any offensive social media posts and to refrain from harassing Greenwich further.

On 31 October 2026, Latham was served with a bankruptcy notice for about $175,000 owed to Greenwich, threatening to make Latham bankrupt, which would mean he would lose his seat in parliament.

=== Independent (since 2023) ===
In 2025, Latham opposed the sale of Rosehill Racecourse. Premier Chris Minns proposed the sale to build more homes and a metro station. The proposal was rejected in May 2025 by a membership vote of 56.1% against compared to 43.9% in favour.

In July 2025, Latham was criticised for allegedly taking photographs of female MPs in parliament and sending them, together with disparaging comments, to his then girlfriend, Nathalie Matthews. Minns suggested his behaviour should be examined by the parliamentary privileges committee.

In November 2025, after a neo-Nazi rally at New South Wales Parliament House, Latham compared Premier Minns to Adolf Hitler and used slurs to refer to members of his cabinet. Latham also read sections of Hitler's Mein Kampf on the floor of parliament.

In 2026, Latham became involved in a dispute about the Minns government's refusal to release documents to the Legislative Council.

== Personal life ==
Latham began dating his first wife, Gabrielle Gwyther, in 1987, and they married in 1991. They separated in 1997 and divorced in 1999. Latham married his second wife, Janine Lacy, in 2000; they had two sons together. Latham announced his separation from Lacy in 2022.

In 2026, Latham's conflict with former girlfriend, Nathalie Matthews, led to a war of words in parliament.

Latham has described himself as a humanist. In a 2004 interview he said "I'm agnostic. I think there's a force, a spiritual world beyond the material. But I'm not in a position to define it, let alone put it into a certain form of religious practice."

Civic offices
Preceded by Colin Harrington	Mayor of Liverpool; 1991–1994	Succeeded by George Paciullo
Parliament of Australia
Preceded by John Kerin	Member for Werriwa; 1994–2005	Succeeded by Chris Hayes
Political offices
Preceded by Warren Truss as Shadow Minister for Consumer Affairs	Shadow Minister for Competition Policy and Local Government; 1996–1997	Succeeded by Belinda Neal as Shadow Minister for Consumer Affairs and Local Government
Preceded by Bruce Scott as Shadow Minister for Local Government	Shadow Minister for Competition Policy and Local Government; 1996–1997	Succeeded by Belinda Neal as Shadow Minister for Consumer Affairs and Local Government
Preceded by Peter Baldwin	Shadow Minister for Education and Youth Affairs; 1997–1998	Succeeded by Michael Lee as Shadow Minister for Education
Preceded by Peter Baldwin	Shadow Minister for Education and Youth Affairs; 1997–1998	Succeeded by Kate Lundy as Shadow Minister for Sport and Youth Affairs
Preceded by Kelvin Thomson	Shadow Assistant Treasurer; 2001–2002	Succeeded by David Cox
Preceded by Belinda Neal as Shadow Minister for Consumer Affairs, Local Government, Housing and Childcare	Shadow Minister for Urban Development and Housing; 2001–2002	Succeeded by Himself as Shadow Minister for Economic Ownership, Housing and Urban Development and Community Security
New office	Shadow Minister for Economic Ownership; 2001–2002	Succeeded by Himself as Shadow Minister for Economic Ownership, Housing and Urban Development and Community Security
Preceded by Himself as Shadow Minister for Urban Development and Housing and Shadow Minister for Economic Ownership	Shadow Minister for Economic Ownership, Housing and Urban Development and Community Security; 2002–2003	Succeeded by Martin Ferguson as Shadow Minister for Urban and Regional Development, Transport and Infrastructure
Preceded by Himself as Shadow Minister for Urban Development and Housing and Shadow Minister for Economic Ownership	Shadow Minister for Economic Ownership, Housing and Urban Development and Community Security; 2002–2003	Succeeded by Gavan O'Connor as Shadow Minister for Regional Services, Local Government and Housing
Preceded by Wayne Swan	Manager of Opposition Business in the House; 2003	Succeeded by Julia Gillard
Preceded by Bob McMullan as Shadow Minister for Treasury, Finance and Small Business	Shadow Treasurer of Australia; 2003	Succeeded by Simon Crean
Preceded by Simon Crean	Leaders of the Opposition of Australia; 2003–2005	Succeeded by Kim Beazley
Party political offices
Preceded by Simon Crean	Leader of the Australian Labor Party; 2003–2005	Succeeded by Kim Beazley
