= Jenny Macklin =

Australian politician

The Honourable Jenny Macklin AC
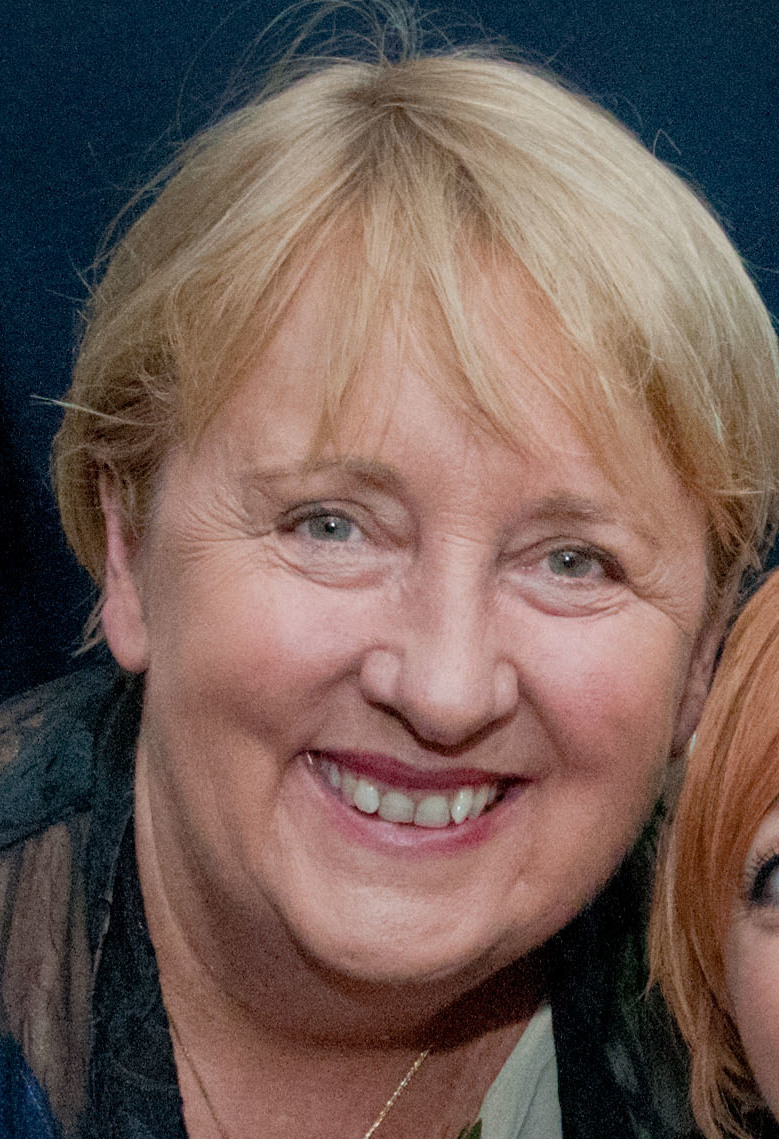
- Macklin in 2013

Minister for Disability Reform
- In office 14 December 2011 – 18 September 2013
- Prime Minister: Julia Gillard; Kevin Rudd
- Preceded by: Office established
- Succeeded by: Jane Prentice (2016)

Minister for Families, Community Services and Indigenous Affairs
- In office 3 December 2007 – 18 September 2013
- Prime Minister: Kevin Rudd; Julia Gillard
- Preceded by: Mal Brough
- Succeeded by: Kevin Andrews as Minister for Social Services; Nigel Scullion as Minister for Indigenous Affairs

Deputy Leader of the Opposition
- In office 22 November 2001 – 4 December 2006
- Leader: Simon Crean; Mark Latham; Kim Beazley
- Preceded by: Simon Crean
- Succeeded by: Julia Gillard

Deputy Leader of the Labor Party
- In office 22 November 2001 – 4 December 2006
- Leader: Simon Crean; Mark Latham; Kim Beazley
- Preceded by: Simon Crean
- Succeeded by: Julia Gillard

Member of the Australian Parliament for Jagajaga
- In office 2 March 1996 – 11 April 2019
- Preceded by: Peter Staples
- Succeeded by: Kate Thwaites

Personal details
- Born: Jennifer Louise Macklin; 29 December 1953 (age 72) Brisbane, Queensland, Australia
- Party: Labor
- Domestic partner: Ross Turner
- Children: 3
- Education: University of Melbourne
- Occupation: Researcher

Jennifer Louise Macklin AC (born 29 December 1953) is an Australian former politician. She was elected to federal parliament at the 1996 federal election and served as the deputy leader of the Australian Labor Party (ALP) from 2001 to 2006, under opposition leaders Simon Crean, Mark Latham and Kim Beazley. After the ALP won government at the 2007 election, she held ministerial office under Kevin Rudd and Julia Gillard, serving as Minister for Families, Community Services and Indigenous Affairs (2007–2013) and Minister for Disability Reform (2011–2013). She retired from parliament at the 2019 election.

== Early life ==
Macklin was born in Brisbane on 29 December 1953. Her father was an engineer. She grew up in country Victoria, initially in Cohuna where she attended the local primary school. In 1966 the family moved to Wangaratta where she attended Wangaratta High School, also spending a year as an exchange student in Japan on a Rotary Scholarship. Macklin went on to the University of Melbourne, graduating with the degree of Bachelor of Commerce (Hons.).

From 1976 to 1978, Macklin worked as a researcher at the Australian National University (ANU) under accounting and finance professor Russell Matthews. She then joined the Parliamentary Library as an economics specialist within the Legislative Research Service. She was a member of a Canberra discussion group, the Red Fems, which presented a paper to the Women and Labour Conference in 1980. Her work on energy pricing in the aluminium industry came to the attention of Victorian Labor MP Brian Howe, and in 1981 he recruited her to join the Labor Resource Centre in Melbourne as a research coordinator. From 1985 to 1988, Macklin served as an adviser to David White, the state health minister.

In 1990, Macklin's mentor Brian Howe was appointed Minister for Health in the Hawke government. She was subsequently appointed as the director of the government's National Health Strategy (NHS) initiative, tasked with reviewing Australia's existing health system. She delivered a series of background papers and issues papers, one of which proposed the abolition of private health insurance. The NHS body was disbanded in 1993 following a one-year extension of its initial two-year term. Macklin then served as director of the Australian Urban and Regional Development Review from 1993 to 1995.

== Political career ==
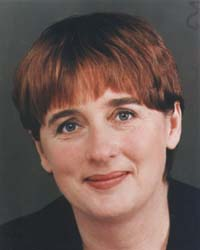
Official portrait, 1996

In 1994, Macklin won ALP preselection for the Division of Jagajaga, defeating former Casey MP Peter Steedman.

=== Opposition (1996–2007) ===
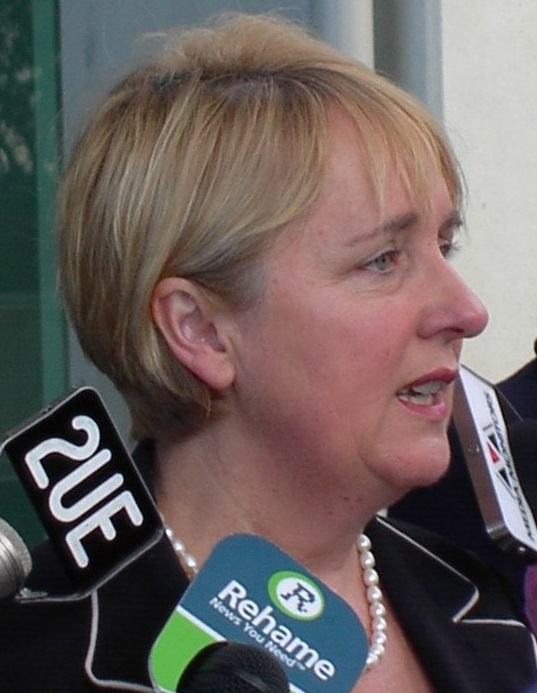
Macklin in August 2005

Macklin was elected to parliament at the 1996 federal election, which saw the defeat of the ALP government. She was immediately elected a member of the shadow ministry, where she served in a number of roles, including Shadow Minister for Aged Care, Social Security and the Status of Women. After the 1998 election, Macklin became Shadow Minister for Health. She is a member of the Socialist Left faction of the Labor Party.

After the ALP's defeat at the 2001 election, Macklin was elected unopposed as deputy leader to Simon Crean. She was the first woman to hold a leadership position in either Australian major party. She took on the position of Shadow Minister for Education. Macklin remained Deputy Leader after Crean's replacement as leader by Mark Latham in December 2003, and also under Kim Beazley following Latham's resignation in January 2005. Macklin became the first person to be deputy to three leaders of the ALP since Frank Forde.

On 1 December 2006, Macklin's position as deputy leader of the ALP came under threat after Kim Beazley called for a spill of all the leadership positions, in a bid to end growing speculation over the issue. Shadow Minister for Foreign Affairs and Trade, Kevin Rudd, and Shadow Minister for Health, Julia Gillard, announced their intentions to run against Beazley and Macklin as a team for the positions of leader and deputy leader respectively of the party. On the day of the ballot, Macklin effectively stepped down from the position, choosing not to contest the deputy leadership after Kevin Rudd was elected as the new party leader. Macklin was once again elected to the Shadow frontbench, and was appointed Shadow Minister for Families and Community Services and Shadow Minister for Indigenous Affairs and Reconciliation. She maintained these portfolios in government after Labor's victory in the 2007 election.

=== Government (2007–2013) ===
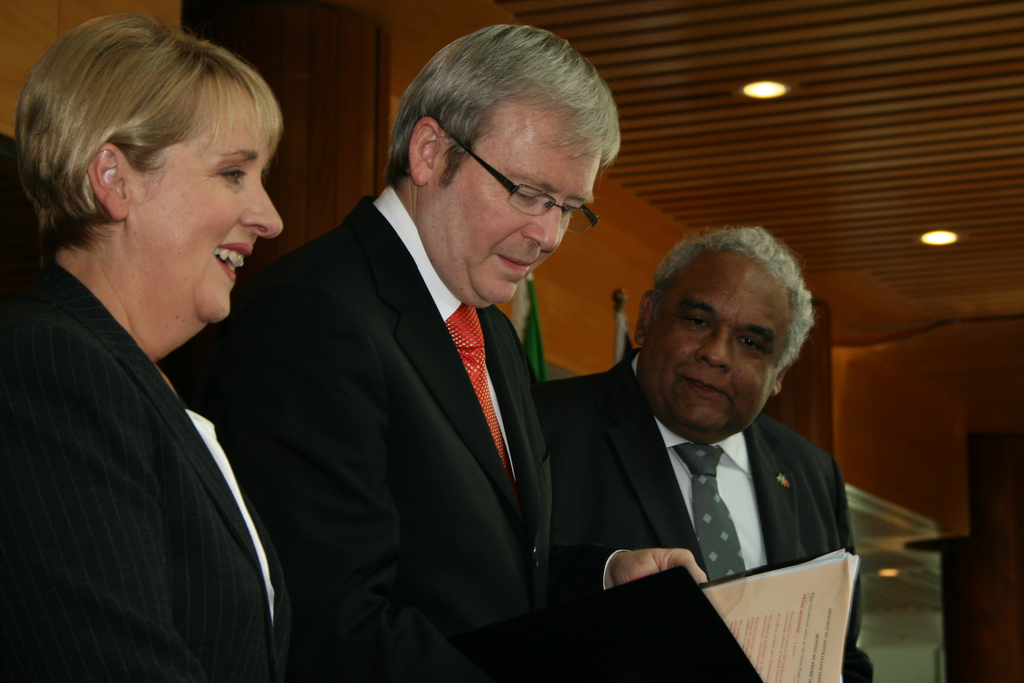
Macklin with Prime Minister Kevin Rudd and Tom Calma at the apology for the stolen generations in 2008

In 2007, Macklin became the Minister for Families, Housing, Community Services and Indigenous Affairs. In this capacity she oversaw the passage and implementation of Australia's first national Paid Parental Leave Scheme, the Closing the Gap framework to address the life expectancy gap between Indigenous and non-Indigenous Australians, a historic rise in the pensions and a number of other significant changes to social policy and family support payments.

In 2011, Macklin was given the additional responsibility of Minister for Disability Reform, overseeing the design and implementation of the National Disability Insurance Scheme (NDIS). Macklin was also a member of the Government's Expenditure Review Committee and Chair of the Government's Social Policy Committee.

==== Indigenous Affairs ====
Macklin was Minister for Indigenous Affairs throughout the Labor government's two terms in office. Macklin was instrumental in the Apology to Australia's Indigenous peoples, delivered by Prime Minister Kevin Rudd in February 2008 and the implementation of the Close the Gap Framework, the first comprehensive strategy for tackling Indigenous disadvantage in Australia's history. This strategy saw record investment in health, education, housing, early childhood development and remote Indigenous service provision.

She has said that one of her most important achievements was to take the politics out of Indigenous affairs and destroy the toxic division between "symbols" and "practical" change. On 23 November 2011, the Stronger Futures Policy legislation was introduced by Macklin to address key issues such as unemployment, school attendance, alcohol abuse, child protection, safety, housing and land reforms in the Northern Territory.

==== National Disability Insurance Scheme (NDIS) ====
On 10 August 2011, Prime Minister Julia Gillard and Minister Macklin announced the Labor government's support for a National Disability Insurance Scheme (NDIS) a major social policy reform designed to ensure that people with disability received the care and support they need.

The rollout of the NDIS commenced in 2013 at four launch sites around Australia, with full rollout to be completed in 2019. Macklin was instrumental in the success of negotiations with states and territories, which resulted in a nationwide agreement on the NDIS. When fully completed in 2019 the NDIS is expected to cover around 460,000 Australians with disability.

==== Paid parental leave ====
Macklin was the Minister was responsible for the design and implementation of Australia's first national paid parental leave scheme. Prior to its launch on 1 January 2011, Australia was one of two developed countries without a national paid parental leave scheme. The scheme provides primary care givers with 18 weeks paid parental leave paid at the national minimum wage. In the six years since the scheme was launched more than 700,000 Australian families have accessed paid parental leave.

An independent review of the scheme in 2014 found that more than 75 per cent of parents accessing paid parental leave were on incomes of less than $70,000 a year. In the 2015 Budget the Abbott government announced a measure to end so called "double dipping" of paid parental leave by restricting 80,000 new parents from accessing both employer and government paid parental leave schemes. The use of the term provoked widespread condemnation from women's groups and some employers. Macklin led Labor's opposition to the Liberal government's cuts to paid parental leave, which have failed to pass the Parliament.

==== Dad and Partner Pay ====
The introduction of Dad and Partner Pay (DAPP) on 1 January 2013, established two weeks paid leave to fathers and partners to help them take time off work to support new mothers in their caring role and be involved in the care of their newborn baby. This was another social policy reform that Macklin spearheaded during her time as Minister. An independent report conducted by the University of Queensland in 2014 found that DAPP reduced the barriers to fathers taking leave following a birth.

==== Apology to Forgotten Australians ====
Macklin was also the steward for the national apology to the Forgotten Australians and former child migrants, in her capacity as Families Minister. Prime Minister Rudd gave the apology on 16 November 2009 on behalf of the Australian Government to over half a million children who were taken from their families and placed in institutions where they were often victims of abuse. Macklin said the apology demonstrated "the shared resolve to make sure the abuse and neglect never happens again".

=== Opposition (2013–2019) ===
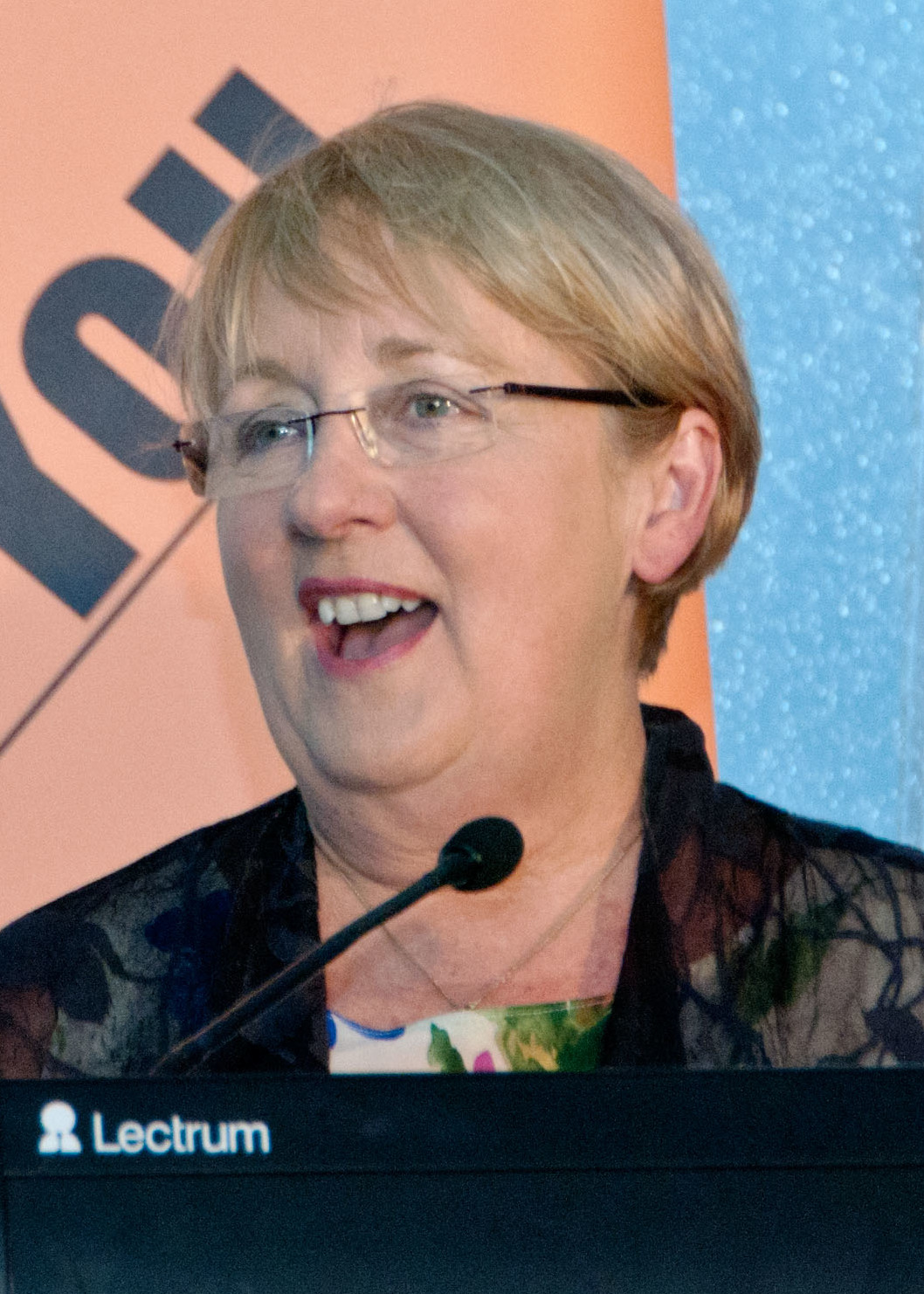
Macklin in 2013

Following the ALP's defeat at the 2013 federal election, Macklin endorsed Anthony Albanese for the leadership of the party. Albanese was defeated by Bill Shorten in the leadership vote. Macklin was included in Shorten's shadow ministry and retained her place until announcing her retirement, holding the portfolios of families and payments (2013–2016), disability reform (2013–2016) and families and social services (2016–2018).

Macklin announced her retirement from politics on 6 July 2018, effective at the 2019 federal election.

== Later activities ==
In June 2020, Macklin and former Victorian Labor Premier Steve Bracks were appointed as administrators of the Victorian branch of the Australian Labor Party by the party's National Executive until early 2021, after allegations of branch-stacking by Victorian minister Adem Somyurek were revealed. The pair will review the state party's operations and provide detailed recommendations to tackle the issue of branch-stacking within the party.

In 2022, Macklin was appointed as chair of the Economic Inclusion Advisory Committee, a panel which publishes yearly recommendations to government on the adequacy of welfare payments. Macklin was also appointed to the Australian University Accords panel in 2022 by education minister Jason Clare. The panel published a final report in 2024 recommending reforms to Australia's higher education system.

== Honours ==
Macklin was appointed as a Companion of the Order of Australia in the 2023 King's Birthday Honours for "eminent service to the people and Parliament of Australia, to social welfare, particularly the introduction of paid parental leave and the National Disability Insurance Scheme, and to the Indigenous community".

== See also ==
- First Rudd Ministry
- First Gillard Ministry
- Second Gillard Ministry
- Second Rudd Ministry

Political offices
Preceded by Mal Brough	Minister for Families, Community; Services and Indigenous Affairs; 2007–2013	Succeeded by Kevin Andrews
Parliament of Australia
Preceded by Peter Staples	Member for Jagajaga; 1996–2019	Succeeded by Kate Thwaites
Party political offices
Preceded by Simon Crean	Deputy Leader of the Australian Labor Party; 2001–2006	Succeeded by Julia Gillard
