= Kim Beazley =

Australian politician (born 1948)

The Honourable Kim Beazley AC
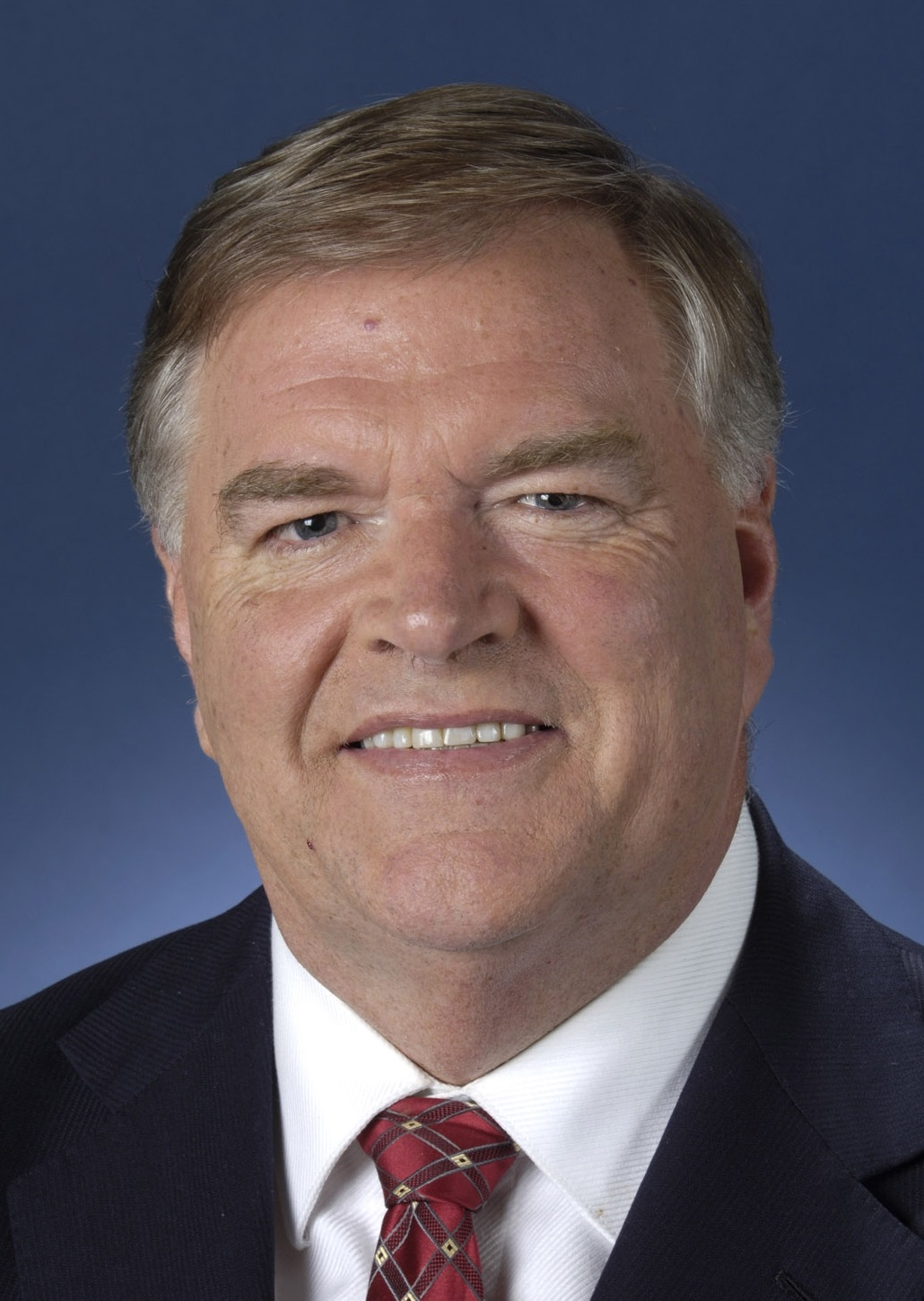
- Official portrait, 2005

Governor of Western Australia
- In office 1 May 2018 – 30 June 2022
- Monarch: Elizabeth II
- Premier: Mark McGowan
- Preceded by: Kerry Sanderson
- Succeeded by: Chris Dawson

Leader of the Opposition
- In office 28 January 2005 – 4 December 2006
- Prime Minister: John Howard
- Deputy: Jenny Macklin
- Preceded by: Mark Latham
- Succeeded by: Kevin Rudd
- In office 19 March 1996 – 22 November 2001
- Prime Minister: John Howard
- Deputy: Gareth Evans; Simon Crean
- Preceded by: John Howard
- Succeeded by: Simon Crean

Deputy Prime Minister of Australia
- In office 20 June 1995 – 11 March 1996
- Prime Minister: Paul Keating
- Preceded by: Brian Howe
- Succeeded by: Tim Fischer

Leader of the House
- In office 15 February 1988 – 11 March 1996
- Prime Minister: Bob Hawke; Paul Keating
- Preceded by: Mick Young
- Succeeded by: Peter Reith
Party leadership
Leader of the Labor Party
In office 28 January 2005 – 4 December 2006
Deputy	Jenny Macklin
Preceded by	Mark Latham
Succeeded by	Kevin Rudd
In office 19 March 1996 – 22 November 2001
Deputy	Gareth Evans; Simon Crean
Preceded by	Paul Keating
Succeeded by	Simon Crean
Deputy Leader of the Labor Party
In office 20 June 1995 – 19 March 1996
Leader	Paul Keating
Preceded by	Brian Howe
Succeeded by	Gareth Evans
Cabinet positions
Minister for Finance
In office 23 December 1993 – 11 March 1996
Prime Minister	Paul Keating
Preceded by	Ralph Willis
Succeeded by	John Fahey
Minister for Employment and Education
In office 27 December 1991 – 23 December 1993
Prime Minister	Paul Keating
Preceded by	John Dawkins
Succeeded by	Simon Crean
Minister for Transport and Communications
In office 4 April 1990 – 27 December 1991
Prime Minister	Bob Hawke
Preceded by	Ralph Willis
Succeeded by	Graham Richardson
Minister for Defence
In office 13 December 1984 – 4 April 1990
Prime Minister	Bob Hawke
Preceded by	Gordon Scholes
Succeeded by	Robert Ray
Minister for Aviation
In office 11 March 1983 – 13 December 1984
Prime Minister	Bob Hawke
Preceded by	Wal Fife
Succeeded by	Peter Morris

Ambassador of Australia to the United States
- In office 17 February 2010 – 22 January 2016
- Prime Minister: Kevin Rudd; Julia Gillard; Tony Abbott; Malcolm Turnbull
- Preceded by: Dennis Richardson
- Succeeded by: Joe Hockey

Member of the Australian Parliament for Brand
- In office 2 March 1996 – 17 October 2007
- Preceded by: Wendy Fatin
- Succeeded by: Gary Gray

Member of the Australian Parliament for Swan
- In office 18 October 1980 – 2 March 1996
- Preceded by: John Martyr
- Succeeded by: Don Randall

Personal details
- Born: Kim Christian Beazley; 14 December 1948 (age 77) Subiaco, Western Australia, Australia
- Party: Labor
- Spouses: Mary Ciccarelli (m. 1974; div. 1988); Susie Annus (m. 1990)
- Children: 3, including Hannah
- Parents: Kim Beazley Sr.; Betty Judge
- Education: Hollywood Senior High School
- Alma mater: University of Western Australia (BA, MA); Balliol College, Oxford (MPhil)
- Profession: Academic, politician, diplomat
- Kim Beazley's voice Beazley, as Australian Ambassador to the United States, speaking to The Australia-China Youth Dialogue on Australia-China-US relations Recorded 31 July 2013

Kim Christian Beazley (born 14 December 1948) is an Australian former politician and diplomat. Since 2022 he has served as chairman of the Australian War Memorial. Previously, he was leader of the Australian Labor Party (ALP) and leader of the opposition from 1996 to 2001 and 2005 to 2006, having previously been a cabinet minister in the Hawke and Keating governments. After leaving parliament, he served as ambassador to the United States from 2010 to 2016 and 33rd governor of Western Australia from 2018 to 2022.

Beazley was born in Perth, the son of politician Kim Beazley Sr. He studied at the University of Western Australia and Balliol College, Oxford, as a Rhodes Scholar. After a period as a lecturer at Murdoch University, Beazley was elected to Parliament at the 1980 election, winning the Division of Swan. Prime Minister Bob Hawke appointed Beazley to the cabinet following Labor's victory at the 1983 election, and Beazley served as a minister continuously through to the party's defeat at the 1996 election. His roles included Minister for Defence from 1984 to 1990, Leader of the House from 1988 to 1996, Minister for Finance from 1993 to 1996 and the ninth deputy prime minister from 1995 to 1996.

After Labor's 1996 defeat, Beazley was elected unopposed as Labor Leader, replacing Paul Keating. Despite winning the popular vote at the 1998 election, Beazley could not win enough seats to form government, and after a second defeat in 2001, he resigned the leadership. He attempted twice to return to the leadership, doing so in 2005 after Labor lost the 2004 election, but was successfully challenged by Kevin Rudd in December 2006 following poor opinion polling. Beazley retired from Parliament at the 2007 election, which Labor won, and in 2010 was appointed Ambassador to the United States. He held this role until 2016, before being nominated as Governor of Western Australia by the premier, Mark McGowan, in 2018.

== Early life and education ==
Beazley was born at King Edward Memorial Hospital in Subiaco, Western Australia, on 14 December 1948. His father, Kim Beazley, was the Labor MP for Fremantle from 1945 to 1977 and served as Minister for Education in the Whitlam government from 1972 to 1975. His mother, Betty Judge, was an Australian athletics champion and record-holder. Beazley's uncle, the Reverend Syd Beazley, who was one of seven Methodist missionaries serving local people in Rabaul, was one of 208 civilians and 805 soldiers taken as prisoners by the invading forces of Japan, who later died in the sinking of the SS Montevideo Maru in July 1942.

Beazley contracted polio at the age of six. He was educated at Hollywood Senior High School and the University of Western Australia, from which he holds a Bachelor of Arts and a Master of Arts. Beazley subsequently won a Rhodes Scholarship at Balliol College, Oxford and graduated with a Master of Philosophy. While at Oxford, he befriended Tony Blair, who would later become Prime Minister of the United Kingdom, and Geoff Gallop, who would later become Premier of Western Australia. On his return to Australia, Beazley tutored and lectured in politics at Murdoch University in Perth. A Labor Party member since his youth, he joined the right-wing Labor Unity faction, alongside fellow future Cabinet ministers Graham Richardson and John Ducker. Beazley won selection for the seat of Division of Swan in 1979, and was elected to the House of Representatives at the 1980 election.

== Political career ==
=== Cabinet minister, 1983–1996 ===
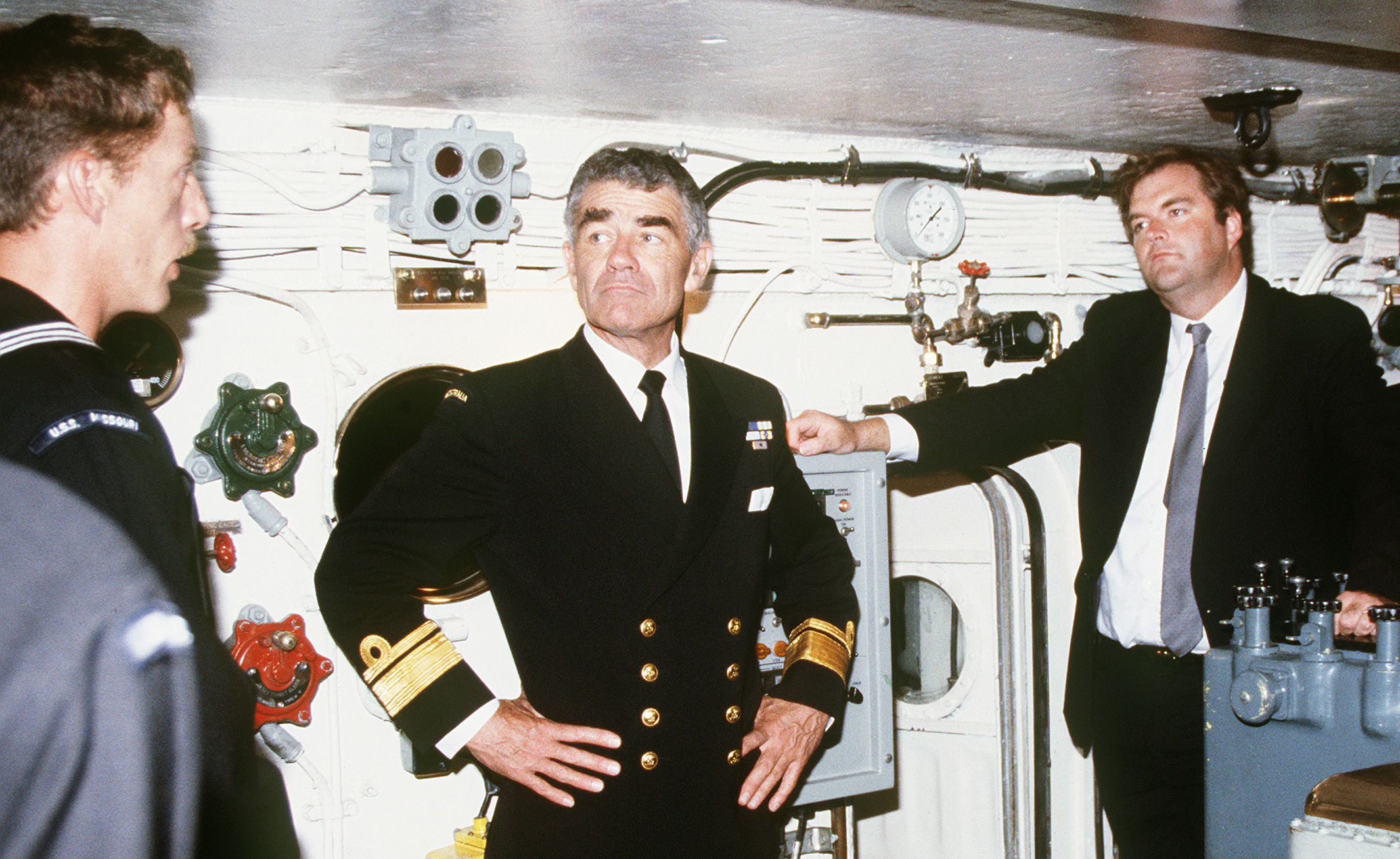
On the USS Missouri, Rear Admiral David Martin and Kim Beazley receive a briefing from the 16 inch gun operator in Turret 1.

Beazley was considered a protege of newly elected prime minister Bob Hawke, who like Beazley was a Western Australian former Rhodes Scholar. Hawke appointed Beazley to the Cabinet immediately after his election in 1983, making him Minister for Aviation. Following a reshuffle after the 1984 election, Beazley was promoted to become Minister for Defence, a role he would hold until 1990, making him one of the longest-serving holders of that post. Beazley took a particularly active role as defence minister, appearing frequently in the press, and was responsible for establishing the Royal Australian Navy's submarine program, although this would be beset by technical problems. Beazley's time as defence minister, combined with his lifelong interest in military matters and enthusiasm for military hardware earned him the nickname "Bomber Beazley" in the press.

In 1988, Hawke appointed Beazley to the additional role of Leader of the House, a position he would continue to hold until the end of the Labor government in 1996. After the 1990 election, Beazley requested to be moved to the role of Minister for Transport and Communications in order to gain greater exposure to domestic political issues. He served in this role until 1991, and fervently supported Hawke during that year's leadership tensions between Hawke and Paul Keating. After Keating successfully challenged Hawke and became Prime Minister in December 1991, he was moved to become Minister for Employment and Education, putting Beazley in charge of overseeing the creation of the government's welfare-to-work programs as part of the economic package 'One Nation'.

Beazley was considered to be a strong supporter of Keating following Labor's fifth consecutive victory at the 1993 election, and in a reshuffle that year, Keating appointed Beazley as Minister for Finance, where he helped to establish the Government's landmark reform of establishing compulsory superannuation schemes. After Brian Howe chose to retire from politics in June 1995, Beazley was elected unopposed to succeed him as Deputy Leader of the Labor Party and was duly appointed deputy prime minister, a role which he held until Labor's defeat at the 1996 election.

Beazley's hold on his seat of Swan grew increasingly tenuous over the years. He saw his majority more than halved in 1990, an election that came during a bad time for the incumbent Labor government in Western Australia. Three years later, he was nearly defeated despite a nationwide swing to Labor. Ahead of the 1996 election, Beazley successfully sought nomination for the safer Labor seat of Brand, just south of his previous seat.

=== First term as Leader of the Opposition, 1996–2001 ===
After Labor's heavy defeat by the Coalition under John Howard in 1996, Beazley was elected unopposed as Leader of the Labor Party, becoming Leader of the Opposition.

Beazley made a strong start in the role, quickly gaining a lead in opinion polls, particularly after Howard broke his previous commitment not to introduce a Goods and Services Tax (GST). Beazley was Labor's lead representative at the Constitutional Convention in February 1998 which was called to discuss the issue of Australia becoming a republic. Beazley advocated "minimalist" change and described transition to a republic as "unfinished business" for Australia. He said that foreigners "find it strange and anachronistic, as many Australians now clearly do, that our head of state is not an Australian". Subsequently, at the 1998 election, Labor polled a majority of the two-party vote and received the largest swing to a first-term opposition since 1934. However, while Labor regained much of what it had lost in its severe defeat of two years earlier, the uneven concentration of their vote left Labor eight seats short of making Beazley Prime Minister. Much of the Labor swing came in seats it already held, not in the seats it needed to take back government.

Despite defeat, by securing a majority of the vote just two years after a landslide defeat, Beazley was re-elected unopposed as Labor Leader. The party spent much of the following three years well ahead in the opinion polls, and seemed set to win the next election, but in August 2001, following the Tampa affair when the Howard government refused to allow several hundred asylum seekers to disembark on Christmas Island, Beazley was judged to have failed in response. Beazley's momentum was further stalled by the September 11 attacks, which saw an increase in support for Howard, who pledged to support the United States, and Labor subsequently lost the 2001 election.

=== Backbencher and Shadow Cabinet Minister, 2001–2005 ===
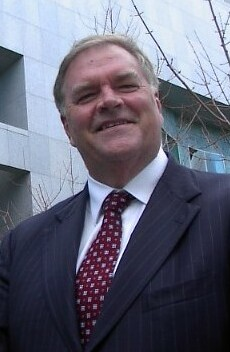
Beazley, then serving as Shadow Minister for Defence, outside Parliament House, Canberra, July 2004

Although Labor's loss in 2001 was narrow, having lost two elections in a row, Beazley felt obliged to resign as Labor Leader; he was succeeded by Simon Crean, and sat on the backbench for the first time since 1983. Despite initial improvements in Labor's opinion polling, by mid-2003 Crean was performing very badly against Howard as preferred Prime Minister, and Labor MPs began to fear that the Coalition would easily win the next election. Beazley was persuaded to challenge Crean for the leadership in June, although Crean was comfortably re-elected.

Despite this, Crean continued to perform poorly in opinion polling, and on 28 November 2003, Crean announced that he would be resigning as Labor Leader. Beazley immediately announced that he would be contesting the leadership, but was narrowly defeated by Shadow Treasurer Mark Latham by 47 votes to 45. After the result, Beazley announced he would remain in Parliament, but was unlikely to return to the frontbench again. In July 2004, however, Latham arranged for Beazley to return to the Labor frontbench as Shadow Defence Minister. This followed controversy over Latham's policy of withdrawing Australian troops from Iraq by the end of 2004. Beazley's return to the front bench was generally seen as a move by Latham to reassure Australian public opinion that a Labor government would not put the United States–Australian alliance at risk. Later that month, Beazley was forced to battle claims he had a "special relationship" with Ratih Hardjono when he was Defence Minister; it was alleged this relationship posed a security risk.

=== Second term as Leader of the Opposition, 2005–2006 ===
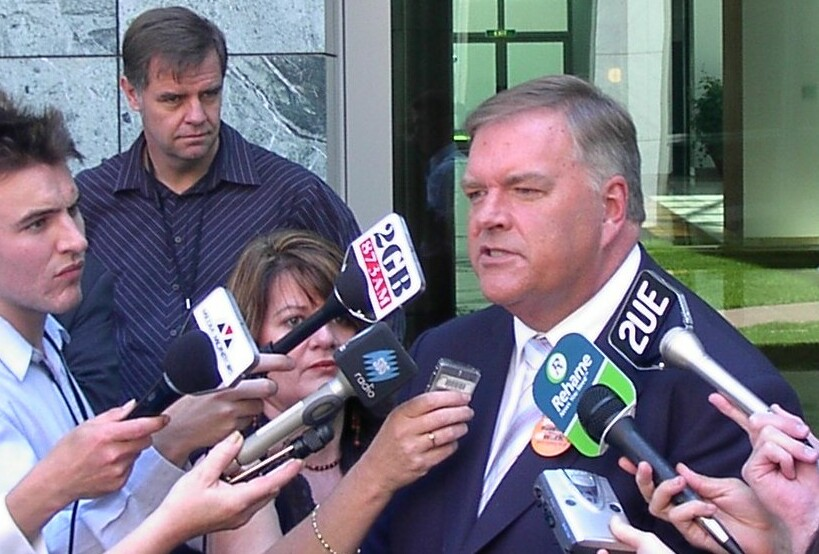
Beazley in November 2005 declaring Labor would "oppose the Howard government's industrial relations legislation in every respect, at every stage until the next election".

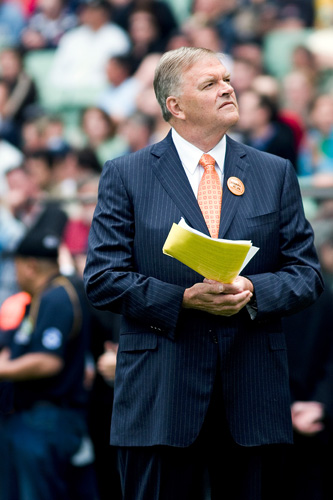
Kim Beazley before a crowd protesting proposed WorkChoices legislation, at the Melbourne Cricket Ground 30 November 2006

Labor was comfortably defeated at the 2004 election, at which Beazley also became the longest-serving Labor MP. He briefly served as a Deputy Speaker from November 2004 to January 2005; after Mark Latham resigned the leadership, Beazley was elected unopposed to replace him in January 2005. Rejecting doubts from some that Labor could win the 2007 election with a leader who had already lost two elections, Beazley said: "There's no doubt in my mind that I can lead a winning team in the next election." Kevin Rudd and Julia Gillard had considered standing in the election, but withdrew at the last moment.

In the first half of 2006, Beazley focused much of the Labor Party's efforts on the Australian Wheat Board (AWB) scandal and the government's WorkChoices legislation; the former allegedly involved bribes and kickbacks with the then-Iraqi dictator Saddam Hussein that breached UN sanctions. The situation reached a climax in the aftermath of treasurer Peter Costello's 2006 budget, whereby for the first time in Australian political history, the opposition leader ceased questioning the budget papers in favour of further questioning on the AWB scandal. This led to heavy media criticism for the Labor Party, although some acknowledged the need for the government to be held accountable for the AWB scandal.

These perceived tactical deficiencies plagued Beazley's return to the leadership and were amplified by factional infighting in the broader Labor Party, raising many questions concerning Beazley's ability to lead. At the time, opinion polls by ACNielsen and Newspoll for preferred prime minister had him at record lows. This was confirmed in a forum on the Special Broadcasting Service (SBS) Insight television program on 2 May 2006. Beazley said that, whilst winning an election would be difficult, he was adamant that the 2007 election would be a "referendum on the Howard government's unfair industrial relations laws".

Beazley's leadership was fatally undermined following several public gaffes, most notably at a press conference on 17 November 2006 when Beazley confused the name of grieving TV host Rove McManus (who had lost his wife Belinda Emmett to cancer at the age of 32) with George W. Bush adviser Karl Rove. Following this, Kevin Rudd and Julia Gillard reached an agreement to challenge Beazley as a joint-ticket, with Rudd as Leader and Gillard as Deputy Leader, and on 30 November 2006, Rudd declared his intention to challenge for the leadership. At the ballot held on 4 December, Rudd defeated Beazley by 49 votes to 39.

Following the ballot, Beazley said of his political future, "For me to do anything further in the Australian Labor Party I would say is Lazarus with a quadruple bypass. So the time has come for me to move on but when that gets properly formalised I will let you know." It was subsequently revealed that Beazley's brother David had died of a heart attack that same day at age 53 shortly before the vote took place; Prime Minister John Howard led tributes to Beazley, saying that he was a "thoroughly decent man" and expressed his "genuine sorrow" both for his political demise and for his family tragedy.

Several figures later speculated that the removal of Beazley as leader in 2006 may have been a mistake in retrospect given the subsequent leadership chaos that engulfed the Labor government from 2010 to 2013. After her own fall as Prime Minister, Julia Gillard expressed regret in working with Rudd to roll Beazley as leader. Mr Beazley has been referred to as "the best prime minister we never had".

== Post-political career ==
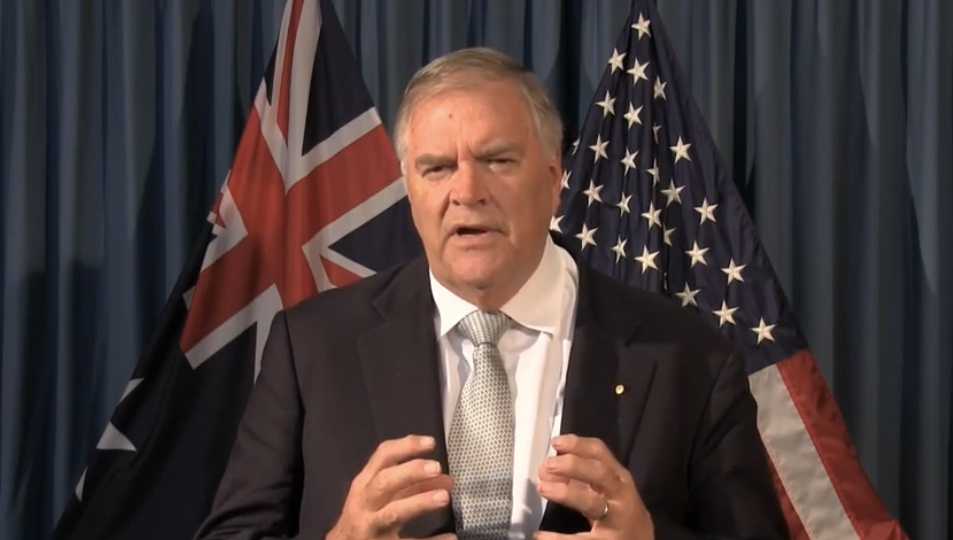
Beazley giving an ANZAC Day message in 2014 from Washington

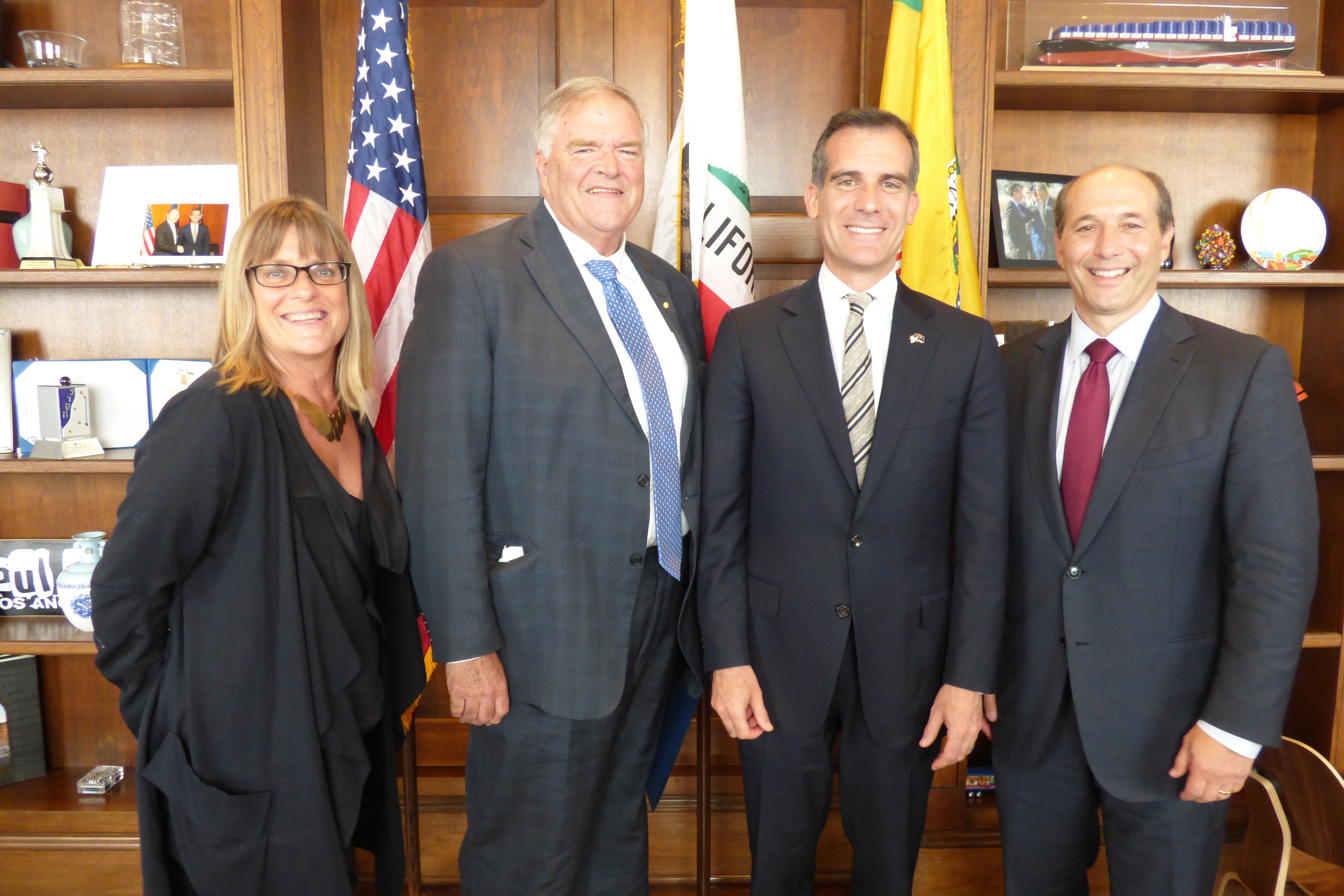
Beazley, flanked by Consul General Karen Lanyon, Mayor Eric Garcetti and US Ambassador to Australia, Jeff Bleich, in California, May 2015

Beazley announced on 13 December 2006 that he would retire from Parliament at the 2007 election, which Labor won in a landslide. In 2009, Beazley was appointed Companion of the Order of Australia (AC) for his service to the Australian Parliament.

Beazley was appointed a professorial fellow at the University of Western Australia, teaching politics, public policy and international relations. He also served as Chancellor of the Australian National University for the duration of 2009, having succeeded Allan Hawke. He was also appointed as a member of the Council of Advisors of the United States Studies Centre at the University of Sydney.

=== Ambassador to the United States, 2010–2016 ===
In September 2009, Prime Minister Kevin Rudd announced that he would appoint Beazley as Australian ambassador to the United States. His appointment began on 17 February 2010. In his role as Ambassador, he promoted global free trade through the Trans-Pacific Partnership and has opposed protectionism. He was succeeded by former treasurer Joe Hockey in January 2016.

In February 2016, shortly after returning to Australia, Beazley was made president of the Australian Institute of International Affairs. Beazley was also named a distinguished fellow of the Australian Strategic Policy Institute.

=== Governor of Western Australia, 2018–2022 ===
In September 2017, it was reported that Beazley was the favoured choice of the premier of Western Australia, Mark McGowan, to replace Kerry Sanderson as governor of Western Australia when Sanderson's term expired in 2018. On 3 April 2018, McGowan confirmed that on his advice, Elizabeth II had approved Beazley to replace Sanderson. Beazley was sworn in as governor on 1 May 2018. In an interview with John Anderson in 2018, Beazley explained why he continued in public life:

I've always had a concern with Australian survival, when you look at the various commitments I've had in political life, an awful lot of it revolves around our national defence. And the sense that I have is that survival is a close-run thing for Australia. Survival on many fronts. The quality of our community is part of that. Our education system is part of that. Our family life is part of that. But also the physical defence of our approaches is part of that. You think about your kids. You think about your grandkids. You think about everybody else's kids. You think about your friends. And you think, what we've got here is a society worth preserving and worth improving. And if you find yourself lucky enough to engage with it ... then you must continue.

Viceregal styles of Kim Beazley (2018–2022)
- Reference style: His Excellency the Honourable
- Spoken style: Your Excellency

=== Chairman of the Australian War Memorial Council ===
Beazley was appointed chairman of the Australian War Memorial Council on 2 December 2022. In this role he has continued to speak on matters of Australia's defence. He has strongly supported progress on the AUKUS security partnership, arguing that nuclear-powered submarines will be "worth the wait" and advocating for faster approvals for the export of nuclear materials. Beazley has expressed concern that successive Australian governments had "dropped the ball" on defence spending since the end of the Cold War. He has argued that a further $5 to $8 billion in military expenditure was needed annually to ensure Australia could adequately defend itself.

== Honours ==
- 2007: Professorial Fellow of the University of Western Australia
- 2009: Companion of the Order of Australia (AC) "For service to the Parliament of Australia."
- 2018: Honorary Commodore in the Royal Australian Navy.
- 2018: Colonel of the Royal Western Australia Regiment.
- 2018: Deputy Prior of the Order of St John.
- 2019: Knight of Grace of the Order of St John

== Personal life ==
Beazley has three daughters. His marriage to Mary Ciccarelli, from 1974 to 1988, brought them Jessica and Hannah. He married Susie Annus in 1990 and they raised their daughter Rachel. Daughter Hannah Beazley followed her father into politics in 2019. She unsuccessfully contested Beazley's former seat of Swan at the 2019 federal election. Subsequently, she won the seat of Victoria Park in the Western Australian Legislative Assembly in 2021.

== Bibliography ==
=== Books and monographs ===
- Beazley, Kim C. & Ian Clark (1979). The politics of intrusion: the super powers and the Indian Ocean. Sydney: Alternative Publishing Cooperative.
- Beazley, Kim (1989). Australia and Asia: our strategic neighbourhood. Sydney: Research Institute for Asia and the Pacific, University of Sydney.
- — (1997). 'New images': an Australian perspective. London: Sir Robert Menzies Centre for Australian Studies, Institute of Commonwealth Studies.

=== Essays, reporting and other contributions ===
- Beazley, Kim E. (2009). Father of the house: the memoirs of Kim E. Beazley. Annotations by Kim C. Beazley and John Bond. North Fremantle, W.A.: Fremantle Press.
- Dean, Peter J., ed. (2013). Australia 1942: in the shadow of war. Foreword by Kim Beazley. Melbourne: Cambridge University Press. ISBN 9781107032279.
- Beazley, Kim (March 2018). "Without America". Correspondence. Quarterly Essay. 69: 125–129.

=== Biographies ===
- FitzSimons, Peter (1998). Beazley: a biography. Pymble, NSW: HarperCollins. ISBN 0-7322-5876-6. OCLC 39444847.

== See also ==
- Political families of Australia

Parliament of Australia
Preceded by John Martyr	Member for Swan; 1980–1996	Succeeded by Don Randall
Preceded by Wendy Fatin	Member for Brand; 1996–2007	Succeeded by Gary Gray
Political offices
Preceded by Ian Viner	Minister Assisting the Minister for Defence; 1983–1984	Succeeded by John Brown and Michael Duffy
Preceded by Wal Fife	Minister for Aviation; 1983–1984	Succeeded by Peter Morris
Preceded by Mick Young	Special Minister of State; 1983–1984	Succeeded by Mick Young
Preceded by Gordon Scholes	Minister for Defence; 1984–1990	Succeeded by Robert Ray
Preceded by Mick Young	Vice-President of the Executive Council; 1988–1991	Succeeded by Graham Richardson
Preceded by Ralph Willis	Minister for Transport and Communications; 1990–1991	Succeeded by John Kerin
Preceded by Ralph Willis	Minister for Finance; 1991	Succeeded by Ralph Willis
Preceded by John Dawkins	Minister for Employment, Education and Training; 1991–1993	Succeeded by Simon Crean
Preceded by Ralph Willis	Minister for Finance; 1993–1996	Succeeded by John Fahey
Preceded by Brian Howe	Deputy Prime Minister of Australia; 1995–1996	Succeeded by Tim Fischer
Preceded by John Howard	Leader of the Opposition; 1996–2001	Succeeded by Simon Crean
Preceded by Chris Evans	Shadow Minister for Defence; 2004	Succeeded by Robert McClelland
Preceded by Mark Latham	Leader of the Opposition; 2005–2006	Succeeded by Kevin Rudd
Party political offices
Preceded by Mick Young	Leader of the House; 1988–1996	Succeeded by Peter Reith
Preceded by Brian Howe	Deputy Leader of the Labor Party; 1995–1996	Succeeded by Gareth Evans
Preceded by Paul Keating	Leader of the Labor Party; 1996–2001	Succeeded by Simon Crean
Preceded by Mark Latham	Leader of the Labor Party; 2005–2006	Succeeded by Kevin Rudd
Academic offices
Preceded by Allan Hawke	Chancellor of Australian National University; 2009	Succeeded by Gareth Evans
Diplomatic posts
Preceded by Dennis Richardson	Ambassador of Australia to the United States; 2010–2016	Succeeded by Joe Hockey
Government offices
Preceded by Kerry Sanderson	Governor of Western Australia; 2018–2022	Succeeded by Chris Dawson
Preceded by Brendan Nelson	Chair of the Australian War Memorial Council; 2022–present	Incumbent
