= 2006 Australian Labor Party leadership spill =

Political party leadership election

2006 Australian Labor Party Leadership spill
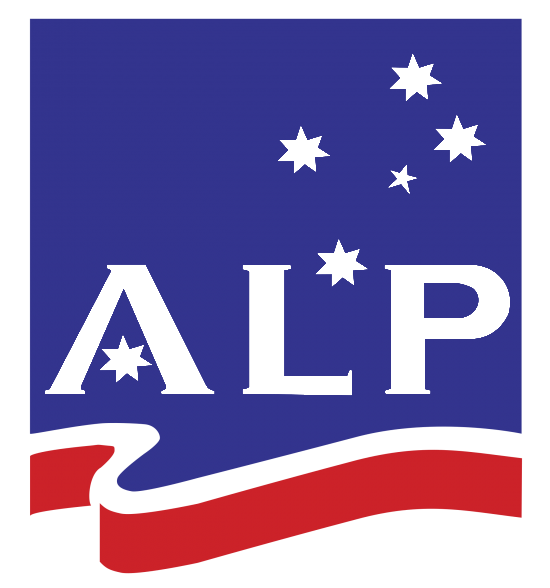
- 4 December 2006
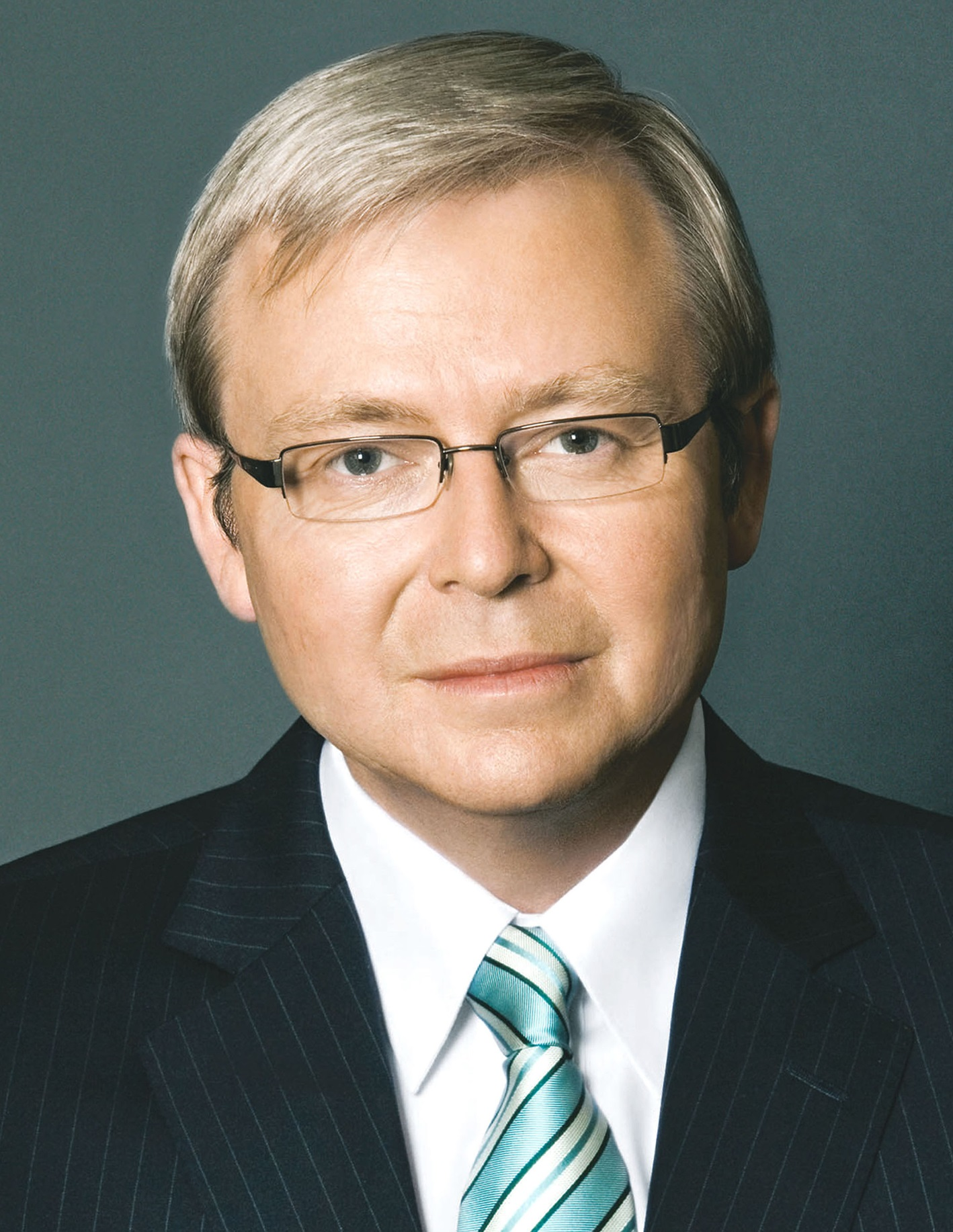

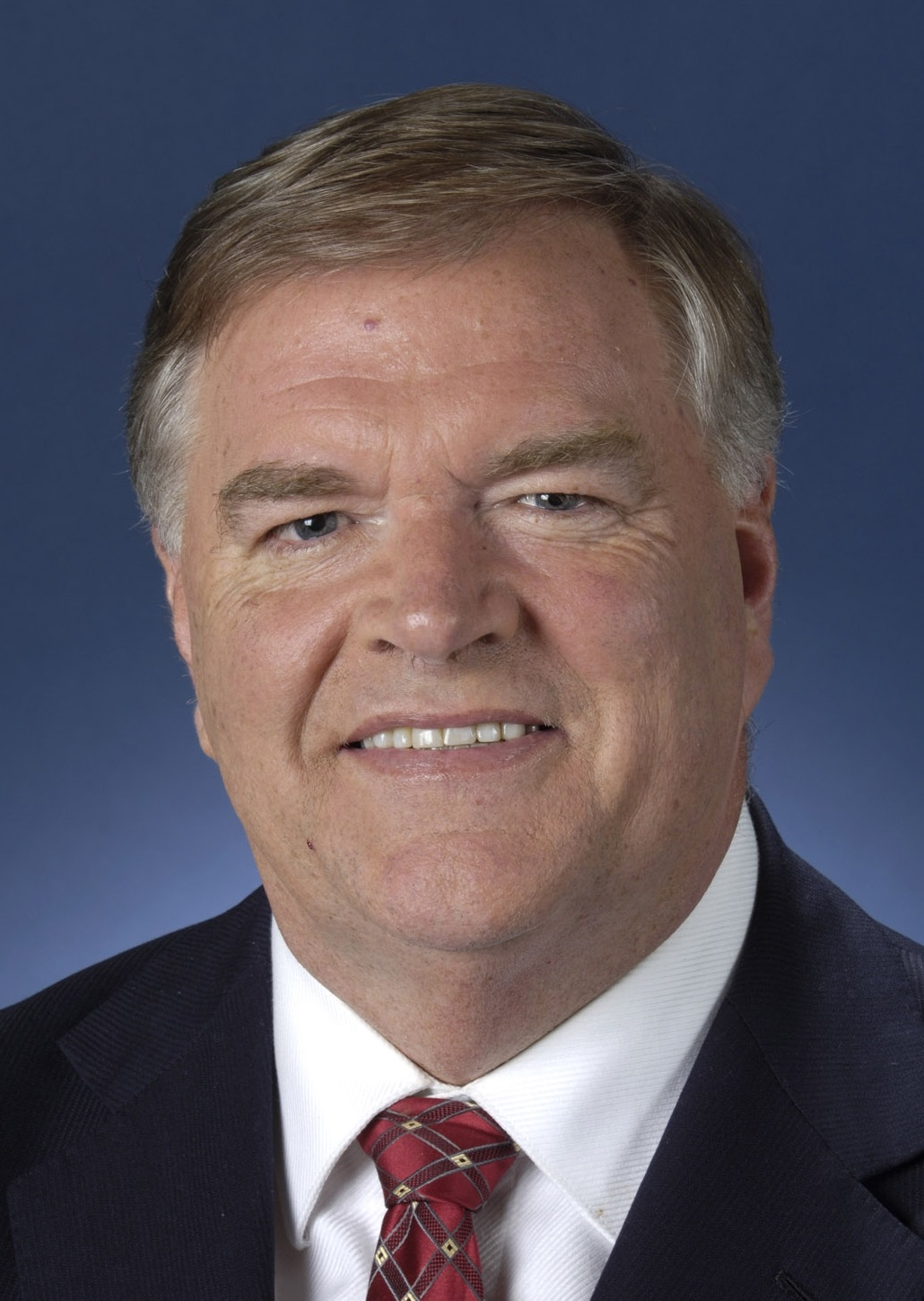
Candidate	Kevin Rudd	Kim Beazley
Caucus vote	49	39
Percentage	55.7%	44.3%
Seat	Griffith (QLD)	Brand (WA)
Faction	Right	Right
Leader before election
Kim Beazley
Elected Leader
Kevin Rudd

A leadership spill of the Australian Labor Party (ALP) was held on 4 December 2006. Opposition Leader Kim Beazley was challenged by Shadow Foreign Minister Kevin Rudd, while Deputy Opposition Leader Jenny Macklin was challenged by Shadow Health Minister Julia Gillard in a joint-ticket. Rudd defeated Beazley, after which Macklin resigned, leaving Gillard to become Deputy Leader unopposed.

== Background ==
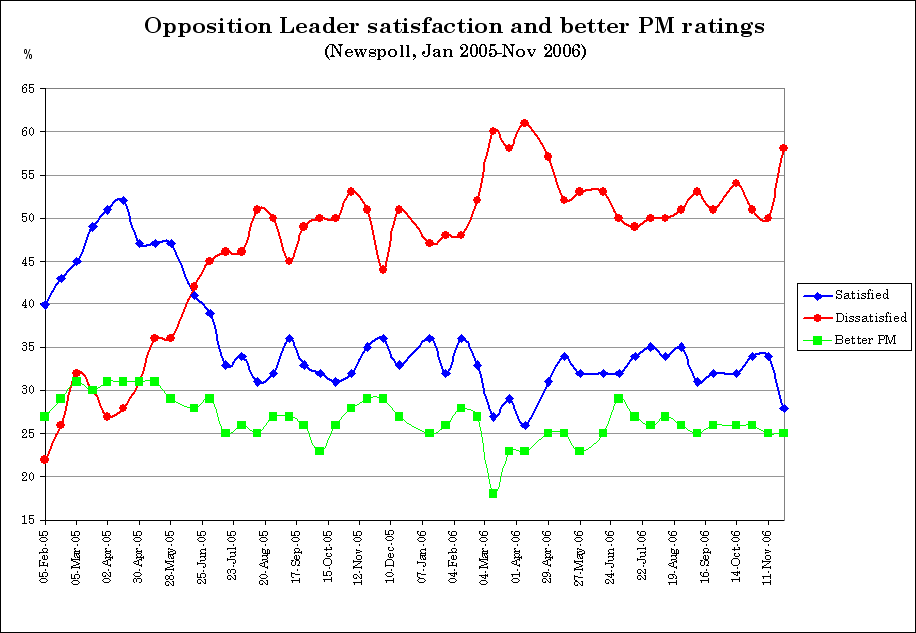
Beazley's Newspoll ratings for 2005–2006. Blue shows satisfaction, red shows dissatisfaction and green shows preferred PM rating.

Kim Beazley was elected unopposed to become Leader of the Labor Party and Leader of the Opposition for a second time on 28 January 2005, replacing Mark Latham who resigned after Labor's 2004 election defeat.

Shortly after his election, Beazley's opinion poll ratings fell to a level between 30 and 35% and never recovered. By November 2006, media sources were claimed that consistently bad polls demonstrated that Beazley did not have the "ability to cut through", and The Australian's editorial complained on 22 November that "after 10 years and 10 months of Kim Beazley, it is still virtually impossible to say what he stands for". In addition, a series of embarrassing media gaffes, including referring to TV presenter Rove McManus as Karl Rove when extending condolences to McManus over his wife's death, raised questions about his ability and capacity to lead.

Despite Beazley's personal unpopularity, the Labor Party was performing very well in the polls, consistently recording 50% and sometimes higher in two-party preferred polls. This was mostly attributed to interest rate rises, the AWB scandal, WorkChoices and many other policies and decisions of the Howard government. Despite this, primary vote polls consistently had Labor below 40%, and it was widely opined that Labor would not be able to win the next election with Beazley as Leader.

Throughout 2006 the Right of the Labor Party, especially in New South Wales and Victoria, had quietly canvassed replacing Beazley and his deputy Jenny Macklin with Kevin Rudd and Julia Gillard, respectively. Rudd was loosely aligned with the Right, while Gillard was a moderate left-winger. Labor sources later indicated that Rudd and Gillard had not themselves actively undermined Beazley, but had been effectively drafted. Rudd's public profile in particular had increased considerably during 2006, mostly through his effective attacks on Foreign Minister Alexander Downer over the AWB scandal. In addition, he had appeared on the Sunrise program on a weekly basis for seven years alongside Liberal MP Joe Hockey, and in October 2006 had written an essay, "Faith in Politics", in national magazine The Monthly that sought to prove that conservative parties did not have a monopoly on the religious vote. According to media reports, the Right of the Labor Party promised to throw its support behind Rudd for the leadership provided he challenge Beazley before Christmas.

A Newspoll conducted in late November concluded that both Rudd and Gillard were significantly more popular than Beazley, and that Labor would be able to win the next election if it was led by either of them. An AC Nielsen poll conducted on 30 November came to exactly the same conclusion.

On 30 November 2006, Rudd met with Beazley and told him that he intended to challenge him for the leadership. On 1 December, Beazley announced a leadership spill, after which Gillard announced she would challenge Macklin alongside Rudd as part of a joint-ticket. Both sides claimed that they were in a winning position, with Rudd claiming his team had a "bucketload of energy", while Beazley claimed that he had more experience.

== Results ==
Australian Labor Party Deputy Leadership spill, 2006
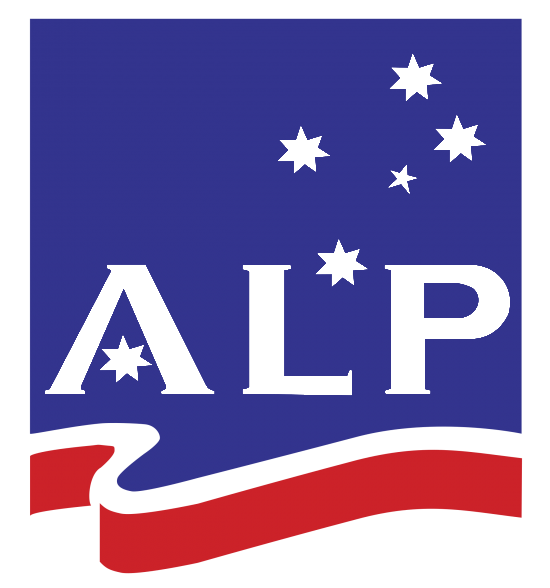
- 4 December 2006
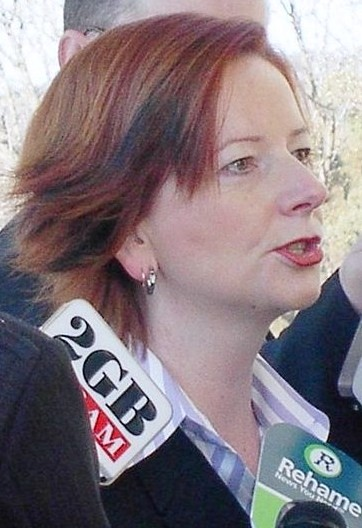

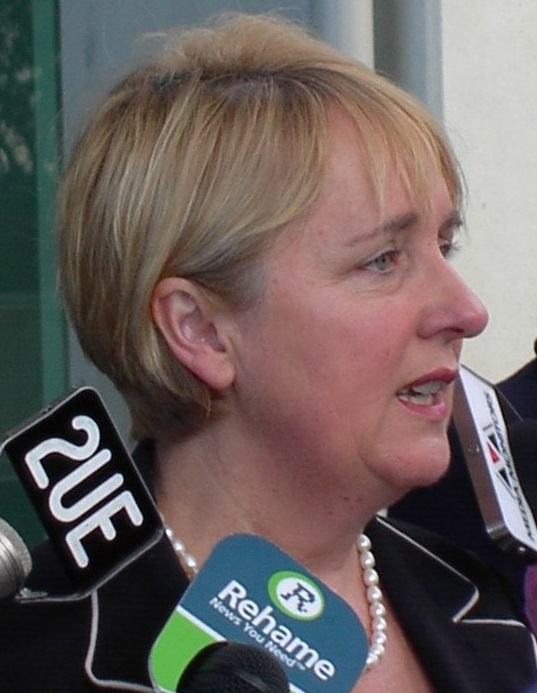
Candidate	Julia Gillard	Jenny Macklin
Caucus vote	Unopposed	Withdrew
Seat	Lalor (VIC)	Jagajaga (VIC)
Faction	Left	Left
Deputy Leader before election
Jenny Macklin
Deputy Leader
after election
Julia Gillard

The election was held on Monday 4 December; Kevin Rudd was declared the winner by 49 votes to 39. Immediately after Rudd had been elected Leader, Jenny Macklin withdrew her candidacy and resigned as Deputy Leader, allowing Gillard to be elected unopposed.

Candidate	Votes
Kevin Rudd	49
Kim Beazley	39

== Aftermath ==
Following the result, Beazley said of his political future, "For me to do anything further in the Australian Labor Party I would say is Lazarus with a quadruple bypass. So the time has come for me to move on, but when that gets properly formalised I will let you know." It was also revealed that his brother David had died of a severe heart attack at age 53, shortly before the vote took place.

Under the leadership of Rudd and Gillard, Labor went on to win the 2007 federal election by a landslide, ending eleven and a half years of the Howard government. The pair were duly sworn in as Prime Minister and Deputy Prime Minister respectively on 3 December 2007. However Rudd would be deposed by Gillard in 2010 sparking a leadership crisis; one which may have been in retrospect been prevented if Rudd hadn't engaged in a leadership spill against Beazley in 2006.

After her own demise as Prime Minister, Gillard has expressed her regret in teaming up with Rudd to bring down Beazley as leader.

On her reflection on this spill in her 2014 memoir, Gillard said: "Was I wrong in my judgement of Kim Beazley in 2006? I fear I may have been, that what I inferred as his lack of interest in the work of opposition was really a more nuanced understanding of electoral politics than I then possessed ... Kim may rightly have judged that we were so likely to win that a quieter biding of time in the lead-up to election day was a better approach than strenuous political exertion."

Peter Garrett, an ALP caucus member who voted for Rudd would also regret this vote saying it was "certainly the biggest" mistake he made in his political career.

In October 2016, almost a decade after Beazley's ousting as leader, journalist Chris Mitchell stated that Beazley was the best Prime Minister Australia never had.

== See also ==
- 2010 Australian Labor Party leadership spill
- March 2013 Australian Labor Party leadership spill
- June 2013 Australian Labor Party leadership spill
- 2007 Liberal Party of Australia leadership election
