= University of Sydney Students' Representative Council =

Students' union in Australia

Students' Representative Council
- University of Sydney

Type
- Type: Undergraduate student union of the University of Sydney

History
- Founded: 1929; 97 years ago

Leadership
- President: Grace Street, Grassroots since 1 December 2025
- Vice-President: Bohao Zhang, Penta since 1 December 2025
- Vice-President: Shovan Bhattarai, Socialist Alternative since 1 December 2024
- General Secretary: Vince Tafea, Grassroots since 1 December 2025
- General Secretary: Ava Cavalerie, Student Left since 1 December 2025

Structure
- Seats: 43
- Political groups: Solidarity (1) Socialist Alternative (8) Grassroots (9) NLS (7) PENTA (11) Engineering for SRC (2) Student Unity (5)
- Length of term: 1 year
- Affiliations: National Union of Students University of Sydney
- Newspaper: Honi Soit

Motto
- Activism, Advocacy, Representation

Website
- Students’ Representative Council

Constitution
- Constitution as at September 2023

The Students' Representative Council (SRC) is the representative body for undergraduate students at the University of Sydney. In addition to a student-elected council and student advocacy portfolios, the SRC coordinates a free legal service and caseworker service for all undergraduate students at the University of Sydney. These services provide legal, academic appeal, migration, tenancy and study advice to students.

The SRC has a reputation as Australia's most radical student union, and has been instrumental in leading student activism on a range of issues including education, feminist justice, environmentalism, First Nations justice and queer rights. The longest-running weekly student newspaper in Australia, Honi Soit, is funded by the SRC.

== Governance ==
=== Council ===
The SRC is governed by the council, which currently consists of 39 representatives elected annually by undergraduate students. One representative is elected for every 1000 undergraduate students at the university. The council meets once a month. Motions can be presented by any student (within or without the council), and are debated on for political merit. Motions usually contain action points that can compel the SRC to commit to student issues, and advocate for student interest concerns.

=== Executive ===
The executive of the SRC is elected annually by the council (bar the president), and consists of the President, Vice-president, General secretary, and five general members, elected proportionally out of council. Meeting fortnightly, the executive makes most significant decisions regarding the SRC.

The day-to-day operation of the SRC is generally conducted by paid staff and paid office-bearers, being the President (directly elected by students), the Vice-President, the General Secretary, the Education Officer(s), and Women's Officer(s).

=== Elections ===
Annual elections are held in September each year, to elect the council, the president, 7 NUS delegates, and the editors of Honi Soit, the student newspaper. Unlike most student organisations, other office-bearers are elected by the council, and not directly by students. All undergraduate students have a right to vote in annual elections.

Approximately 4500 students vote each year.

== History ==
In 1888 the establishment of the Sydney University Undergraduate Association marked the first sign of organised student government on the campus of Sydney University. The Women's Undergraduate Association was formed in 1899 and separate organisations for male and female evening students were to form some years later. In 1929 the four associations agreed to rationalize the governing of the student body, and the Students' Representative Council was established to represent all undergraduates. The first president of the S.R.C. was J. M. Gosper. The 1930/31 Annual Report acknowledges that it is 'largely to the enthusiasm and organising abilities of J. M. Gosper that the council owes its origins.

Student government was initially concerned primarily with gaining a student voice within the official University hierarchy, and promoting student interests within the university environment. However, student leaders soon became aware of their influence within the wider community, and the scope of student politics extended to include issues of broader social and political significance. At various times student activism has been of considerable importance in moulding public opinion in Australia on issues as diverse as apartheid, the death penalty, censorship, conscription and tertiary fees.

Honi Soit is the SRC's official journal and was first published in 1929. Its longevity is perhaps unintended, as the SRC's Annual Report expressed 'doubt as to whether any useful purpose could be served by the continuation of Honi Soit' and the publication was maintained the following year on an 'experimental basis.'

== Presidents ==
Prominent former Presidents of the Sydney SRC include a Prime Minister of Australia, Cabinet Ministers, and Members of Parliaments, State and Federal, Justices of the High Court of Australia and the Supreme Court, including a Chief Justice of New South Wales and a Court of Appeal President. Presidents of the SRC have also regularly proceeded to become Presidents of the National Union of Students.

No.	Portrait	President	Factional grouping	Term start	Term end
1		J.M. Gosper	Independent	1929	1930
2		Frank Wood Bayldon	Independent	1930	1931
3		V.J. Flynn	Independent	1931	1932
4		C.R. Laverty	Independent	1932	1933
5		J. Bowie-Wilson	Independent	1933	1934
6		D.R. Lewis	Independent	1934	1935
7		G.P. Campbell	Independent	1935	1936
8		Kevin Ellis	Independent	1936	1937
9		P.J. Kenny	Independent	1937	1938
10		W. Granger	Independent	1938	1939
11		J.H.E. Mackay	Independent	1939	1940
12		J.S. Collings	Independent	1940	1941
13		P.P. Manzie	Independent	1941	1942
14		Moya McDade	Independent	1942	1943
15		Keith Dan	Independent	1943	1944
16		Marnie Watt	Independent	1944	1945
17		John Nash	Independent	1945	1946
18		John Redrup	Independent	1946	1947
19		Ted McWhinney	Independent	1947	1948
20		Alan Beattie	Independent	1948	1949
21		Jim Brassil	Independent	1949	1950
22		Peter J. Curtis	Independent	1950	1951
23		Phillip Jeffrey	Independent	1951	1952
24		Gregory Bartels	Independent	1952	1953
25		Philip Berthon-Jones	Independent	1953	1954
26		Greg Dunne	Independent	1954	1955
27		Tony Reading	Independent	1955	1956
28		Jim Carlton	Independent	1956	1957
29		Malcolm Broun	Independent	1957	1957
30		Brian L. Hennessy	Independent	1958	1959
31		Martin G. Davey	Independent	1958	1959
32		Robert J. Wallace	Independent	1959	1960
33		Peter Wilenski	Independent	1960	1961
34		John Boyd	Independent	1961	1962
35		Michael Kirby	Independent	1962	1963
36		Bob McDonald	Independent	1963	1964
37		Michael A. Weber	Independent	1964	1965
38		J. Richard Walsh	Independent	1965	1966
39		Geoffrey Robertson	Independent	1966	1967
40		Alan Cameron	Independent	1967	1968
41		James Spigelman	Independent	1968	1969
42		Percy Allan	Independent	1969	1970
43		Barry Robinson	Independent	1970	1971
44		Chris Beale	Independent	1971	1972
45		Chris Sidoti	Independent	1972	1973
46		Brett Mattes	Independent	1973	1974 (Note: Brett Mattes resigned late in his term, and was replaced by John McGrath, who had been elected in 1974 for the 1975 term.)
47		John McGrath	Independent	1974	1975
48		David Patch	Independent	1975	1976
49		Peter Byrnes	Independent	1976	1977 (Note: Peter Byrnes resigned midway through his term, and was replaced by Barbara Ramjan. Ramjan subsequently won election to the presidency in her own right.)
50		Barbara Ramjan	Independent	1977	1978
51		Tony Abbott	Democratic Labor	1978	1979 (Note: At the time of the 1978 SRC Annual Elections the SRC Electoral Regulations specified that the term of office commenced from the time of the official declaration of the poll by the Electoral Officer. There was a bitter dispute after the 1978 Annual Elections as the then Electoral Officer delayed declaration of poll for several weeks after the count had been concluded, resulting in the then President-elect, Tony Abbott, gaining access illicitly over a weekend to the SRC offices and declaring himself in power on the following Monday morning. Access to the SRC offices by Officers and representatives was barred by cohorts of Tony Abbott (from St. John's College) on that Monday morning and subsequent days and, eventually, the Registrar's office was called in to mediate between the contending sides. As a consequence of this in the following year the Electoral Regulations were amended to specify that the term of office commenced on 1 September.)
52		Paul Brereton	Centre Unity	1979	1980
53		Paul Rickard	Centre Unity	1980	1981
54		John Martin	Centre Unity	1981	1982
55		Belinda Neal	Centre Unity	1983	1984
56		Mark Heyward	Liberal	1984	1985
57		Helen Spowart	Council of ALP Students	1985	1986
58		Joe Hockey	Liberal	1986	1987
59		Liz Gardiner	Left Alliance	1987	1988
60		Rod McDonald	Left Alliance	1988	1989 (Note: For the period to the end of 1988, Sydney University operated on the three-terms-a-year system and SRC Annual elections were held in Trinity (second) term in July. Subsequent to the University changing to the semester system in 1989, the SRC Electoral Regulations were changed during 1988 (to take effect from 1 Jan, 1989) to the effect that SRC Annual Elections be held in second semester and that the term of office of the Council be for one year from 1 December to 30 November the following year. Falling in a transition year, McDonald held office for 15 months.)
61		Vanessa Chan	Left Alliance	1989	1990
62		Caitlin Vaughan	Left Alliance	1990	1991
63		Amanda Lees	Left Alliance	1991	1992
66		Anna Davis	Left Alliance	1992	1993
67		Heidi Norman	Left Alliance	1993	1994
68		Nadya Haddad	Left Alliance	1994	1995
69		Catherine Burnheim	Left Alliance	1995	1996
70		Katrina Curry	Left Alliance	1996	1997
71		Adair Durie	Students First	1997	10 March 1998 (Note: Adair Durie was removed from office following the 1997 election.)
72		Luke Whitington	Socialist Left	1998	1999 (Note: Luke Whitington was elected in the 1998 by-election following the removal of Adair Durie, and was elected again at the 1998 general election to serve in 1999.)
73		Natasha Verco	National Broad Left / Activist Left	1999	2000
74		Moksha Watts	Socialist Left	2000	2001
75		Daniel Kyriacou	Socialist Left	2001	2002
76		Jo Haylen	Socialist Left	2002	2003
77		Felix Eldridge	Socialist Left	2003	2004
78		Rose Jackson	Socialist Left	2004	2005
79		Nick Wood	Socialist Left	2005	2006 (Note: The Socialist Left merged into National Labor Students in 2006.)
79		Nick Wood	National Labor Students	2006	2006
80		Angus McFarland	National Labor Students	2006	2007
81		Kate Laing	National Labor Students	2007	2008
82		Noah White	National Labor Students	2008	2009
83		Elly Howse	National Labor Students	2009	2010
84		Donherra (Dee) Walmsley	National Labor Students	2010	2011
85		Phoebe Drake	National Labor Students	2011	2012
86		David Pink	National Labor Students	2012	20 March 2013 (Note: Pink resigned from National Labor Students on the 20 March 2013 joining the newly-formed Sydney Labor Students.)
86		David Pink	Sydney Labor Students	20 March 2013	2013
87		Jennifer Light	Centre Unity	2013	2014
88		Kyol Blakeney	Grassroots Left	2014	2015
89		Chloe Smith	National Labor Students	2015	2016
90		Isabella Brook	National Labor Students	2016	2017
91		Imogen Grant	Grassroots Left	2017	2018
92		Jacky He	Panda	2018	2019
93		Liam Donohoe	Grassroots Left	2019	2020
94		Swapnik Sanagavarapu	Grassroots Left	2020	2021
95		Lauren Lancaster	Grassroots Left	2021	2022
96		Lia Perkins	Grassroots Left	2022	2023
97		Harrison Brennan	Grassroots Left	2023	2024
98		Angus Fisher	National Labor Students	2024	17 February 2025 (Note: Fisher resigned from National Labor Students and joined the newly-formed NSW Labor Students.)
98		Angus Fisher	NSW Labor Students	17 February 2025	2025
99		Grace Street	Grassroots Left	2025	2026
100		Grace Street II	Grassroots Left	2026	2027

== Politics ==
From the mid-1960s the SRC has been at the centre of student activism in Australia. Most activist groupings in the National Union of Students have a presence at Sydney University, such as National Labor Students (Labor Left), Socialist Alternative, Student Unity (Labor Right), the Australian Greens, Grassroots Left and the Liberals.

Since 2000 the SRC has been heavily influenced by what is now National Labor Students (formerly the National Organisation of Labor Students), the student arm of Labor's Socialist Left. Prior to that, from the late 1980s until 1997, the SRC was controlled by the Left Alliance, a former NUS faction made up of a coalition of students to the left of Labor such as Socialists, the Australian Greens, anarchists, queer activists, and environmentalists. Labor Party affiliated factions dominated the SRC presidency from 1998 to 2014. In recent years Labor's hold on power was challenged by independent/non affiliated alliances, internal conflicts within established Labor factions and the emergence of the Grassroots Left. Grassroots Left quickly developed into a national NUS faction with a presence on several campuses. A member of Grassroots, Kyol Blakeney, was elected the second Indigenous president of the university's SRC in 2014. However, in 2015 and 2016, Labor Left faction National Labor Students re-secured the SRC Presidency, in cooperation with Grassroots in 2015 and in cooperation with moderate Liberals in 2016, who supported Edward McCann for the Vice-Presidency of the SRC. However, following the election this coalition collapsed, with a broad left grouping of Labor left, Socialist Alternative, independents and Grassroots elected to all remaining positions. In 2017, Grassroots returned to the presidency, electing Imogen Grant as the 90th President of the SRC. In 2018, an independent party of international students labelled the Panda Warriors won the presidency, electing Jacky He as the 91st President of the SRC. He is the first President to have been elected on primarily the votes of international students within the university. In 2019, Liam Donohoe won the Presidency, returning the SRC to a Grassroots president. In 2020, Swapnik Sanagavarapu was elected to the SRC Presidency unopposed, leading to a back-to-back Grassroots victory. In 2021, Lauren Lancaster retained the Grassroots hold on the presidency in the largest election in USyd's history. Lia Perkins (Grassroots) was elected unopposed to the Presidency for 2023 and Harrison Brennan (Grassroots) secured the 5th consecutive year of Grassroots presidencies when he was elected as the 96th SRC president over National Labor Students' candidate Rose Donnelly.

Angus Fisher (National Labor Students) broke the Grassroots incumbency in 2024, winning the primary vote and ending five years of Grassroots presidencies. The Left bloc (Grassroots, Socialist Alternative, and Solidarity) lost its majority on the council in the same year as the Liberal vote share soared, with Penta holding the balance of power. With the Left bloc supporting Bohao Zhang (Penta) for Vice-Presidency of the SRC, Penta realigned itself and joined the Left bloc to obstruct other factions from executive positions.

== Election results ==
=== 2025 ===
The 2025 elections were held over three days in late September to elect the 2026 Students' Representative Council.

2025 SRC election

Structure
- Political groups: Penta (11) ▲4 Left Action (8) ▲1 Grassroots (7) ▼2 NSWLS (Note: New South Wales Labor Students) (6) ▲3 Engineers (3) ▲3 Unity (2); Liberal (2) ▼7 NLS (Note: National Labor Students) (2) ▲1 Queer Agenda (1) ▲1 Solidarity (1)

Faction	Seats	Change
Penta	11	▲4
Left Action	8	▲1
Grassroots	7	▼2
NSW Labor Students	6	▲3
Engineers	3	▲3
Unity	2	Steady
Liberals	2	▼7
National Labor Students	2	▲1
Queer Agenda	1	▲1
Solidarity	1	Steady

=== 2024 ===
The 2024 election was held in-person on the Camperdown campus from September 24-26 to elect the makeup of the 2025 SRC. Multiple alliance splits and defections make it difficult to estimate the increases and decreases in seat share from the 2023 election and to the 2025 election.

2024 SRC election

Structure
- Political groups: Left (Note: NSWLS and NLS split from the Left bloc.) (17) ▼9 Liberal (9) ▲4 Penta (7) ▲4 NSWLS (Note: Despite fractures between NLS (National Labor Students) and NSWLS (New South Wales Labor Students), who run under Student Unity, that has affected the Council layout, both groups support Impact for President.) (3) ▲3 Student Unity (3) ▲3

Student	Faction	Bloc
Rand Khatib	Grassroots	Left
Ishbel Dunsmore	Grassroots	Left
Norn Xiong	Penta	Penta
Ivan Samsonov	Save	Liberal
Saskia Morgan	Stand Up	Unity
Alisa Rao	Colleges	Liberal
Connor O'Neill	Save	Liberal
Simon Upitis	Left Action	Left
Clare Liu	Penta	Penta
Om Karki	Save	Liberal
Sandip Khadka	Save	Liberal
Christine Peng	Penta	Penta
Angus Fisher	Impact	NSWLS
Eleanor Douglas	Impact	NSWLS
Jasmine Al-Rawi	Left Action	Left
Bohao Zhang	Penta	Penta
Vieve Carnsew	Student Intifada	Left
Deaglan Godwin	Left Action	Left
Maddie Clark	Left Action	Left
Shovan Bhattarai	Left Action	Left
Laura Alivio	Left Action	Left
Alexander Buchanan	Save	Liberal
Arden Skinner	Save	Liberal
Sidra Ghanawi	Grassroots	Left
Kaylie Su	Penta	Penta
Gerard Buttigieg	Impact	NSWLS
Martha Barlow	Grassroots	Left
Harrison Brennan	Grassroots	Left
Grace Street	Grassroots	Left
Anu Khulan	Penta	Penta
William Khoury	Gymbros	Liberal
Ethan Cao	Penta	Penta
Red Tilly	Impact	Left
Philip Howard	STEM	Unity
Lilah Thurbon	Grassroots	Left
Remy Lebreton	Grassroots	Left
Emma Searle	Left Action	Left
Bea McDonald	Colleges	Liberal
Eliza Crossley	Grassroots	Left

=== 2023 ===
2023 SRC election

Structure
- Political groups: Left (26) ▲1 Liberal (5); Penta (3); Left Alliance (2) ▼1 Engineers (1) ▼2

Faction	Seats	Change
Left Action	9	▼1
Grassroots	6	Steady
Switch	3	Steady
Amplify (NLS)	5	▲2
Penta	3	Steady
Liberals	5	Steady
Student Left Alliance	2	▼1
Engineers	1	▼2
Student Unity (Labor Right)	2	Steady
Artistry	1	Steady

=== 2022 ===
2022 SRC election

Structure
- Political groups: Left (25); Liberal (5); Engineers (3); Penta (3); Left Alliance (3); Independent (2)

Faction	Seats	Change
Left Action	10	▲9
Grassroots	6	▼4 (Note: Grassroots and Switch ran as a combined 'Switchroots' ticket in 2021, electing 10 students.)
Switch	3	▼7
Amplify (NLS)	3	▲2 (Note: Compared with the results of Pump in 2021.)
Penta	3	▼2
Lift	3	▲3
Student Left Alliance	3	▲3
Engineers	3	Steady
Independents for Change	1	▲1
Stand Up (Student Unity)	1	▼4
Artistry	1	Steady
Gymbros	1	▲1
Colleges	1	▼1
INTERPOL	1	▲1
Your Mom (Student Unity)	1	▲1
Lefties	0	Steady

== See also ==
- University of Sydney Union
- Sydney University Postgraduate Representative Association
- Honi Soit
