= Honi Soit =

Student newspaper of the University of Sydney

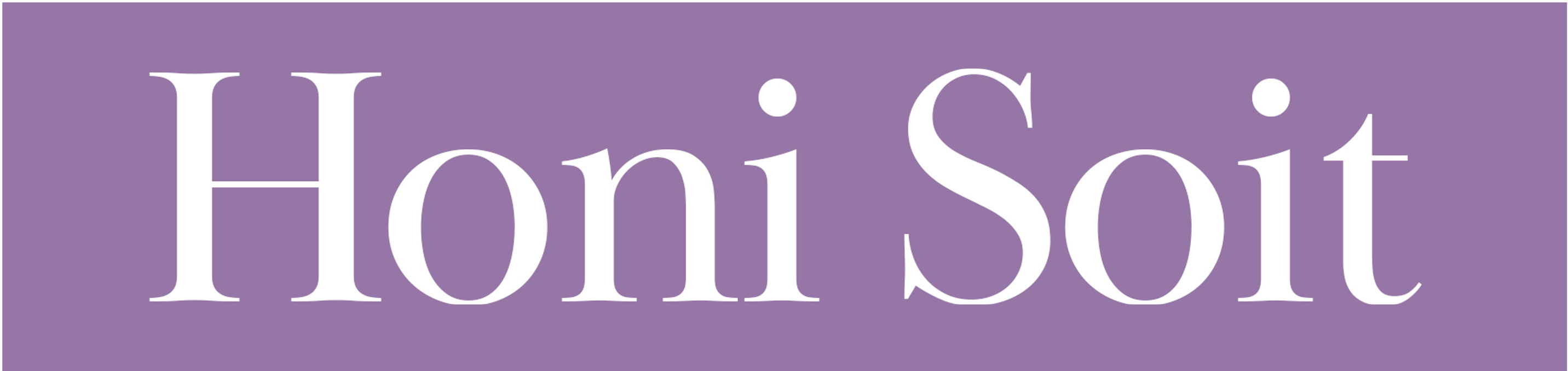
- 2023 logo

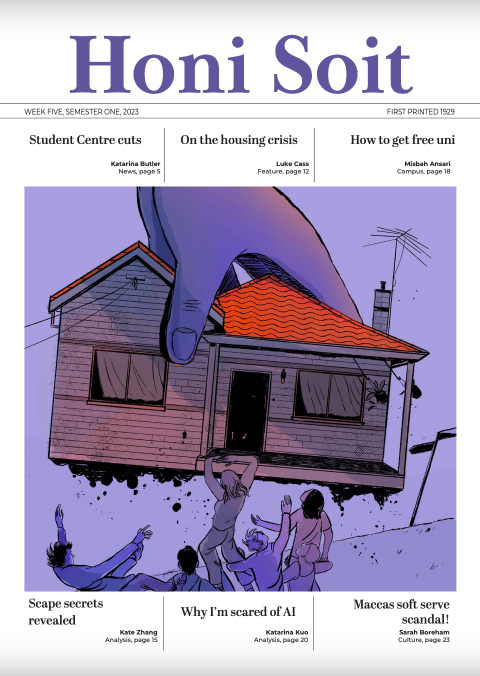
- Cover from 2023
- Type: Weekly newspaper
- Format: Tabloid
- Owner: University of Sydney Students' Representative Council
- Editor: Madison Burland, Anastasia Dale, James Fitzgerald Sice, Kuyili Karthik, Alastair Panzarino, Firdevs Sinik, Sebastien Tuzilovic, Sophie Wishart, Victor Zhang
- Founded: 1929
- Political alignment: Far-left
- Language: English
- City: Camperdown, New South Wales
- Country: Australia
- Circulation: 2,000
- ISSN: 1325-6734
- OCLC number: 1371069804
- Website: honisoit.com

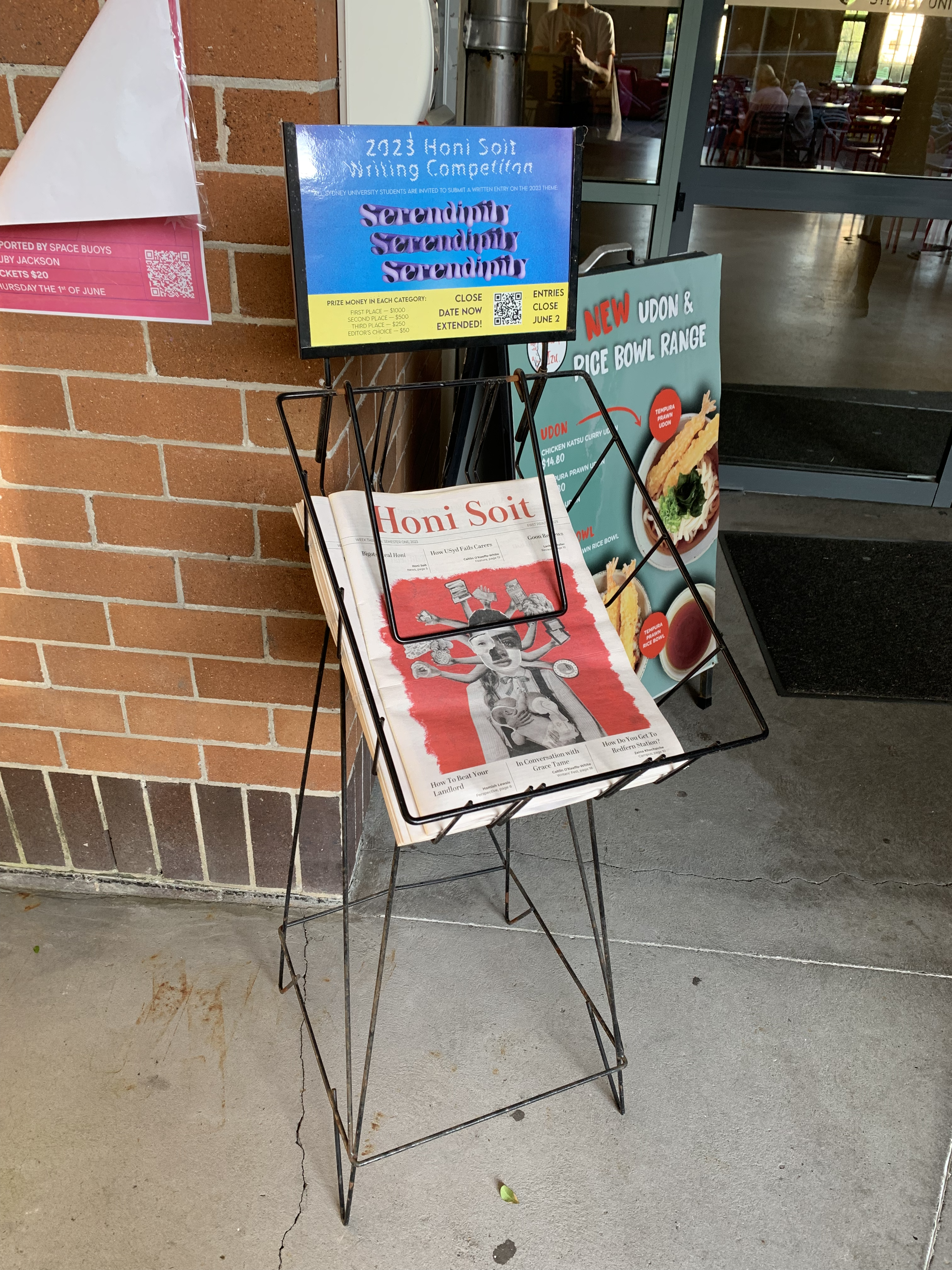
Honi Soit stand outside Manning House

Honi Soit is the student newspaper of the University of Sydney. First published in 1929, the newspaper is produced by an elected editorial team and a select group of reporters sourced from the university's populace. Its name is an abbreviation of the Anglo-Norman phrase Honi soit qui mal y pense, meaning "shamed be (the person) who thinks evil of it". With its radical left-wing posture, the paper is the subject of frequent controversy.

== Layout ==
=== Format and organisation ===
Published as part of the activities of the University of Sydney Students' Representative Council (SRC), Honi Soit is a tabloid-sized publication incorporating a mixture of campus-specific and broader political articles.

Issues are published weekly during university semesters, typically containing a topical feature article; letters to the editors; campus news; political analysis; investigative journalism; culture and reviews; and comedy and satire.

Special editions are published yearly, including Election Honi, devoted towards covering the annual Students' Representative Council elections; Women's Honi dedicated to women's issues and edited autonomously by the SRC's Women's Collective; ACAR Honi, dedicated to platforming culturally diverse voices and edited by the Autonomous Collective Against Racism (ACAR); and Queer Honi, dedicated to covering LGBT issues and edited by the Queer Action Collective (QuAC).

The final edition each year is typically presented as a spoof or parody of an existing newspaper. These editions were traditionally sold on the streets of Sydney to raise money for charity as part of the university's Commemoration Day festivities, though this practice has been discontinued since the 1970s.

Honi Soit is the first and only weekly student newspaper in Australia.

=== Comedy ===
Honi has a strong history of irreverence, often printing humorous and satiric stories alongside traditional journalistic pieces. This has in turn inspired breakaway satiric publications Oz magazine and The Chaser.

The paper's comedy articles have appeared in the mainstream press. In 2012, an article in the comedy section (then called The Soin, parodying The Sun) was featured by Peter Fitzsimmons in The Sydney Morning Herald. In 2013, the Herald reprinted a popular tongue-in-cheek list of Sydney's worst bus routes, which had originally appeared in Honi.

It has become tradition for the final pages of the paper to be presented as a satirical newspaper, most frequently going by the name of The Garter Press, a play on the Order of the Garter from which Honi Soit derives its name.

== Editors ==
The office of editor is highly sought after, and was originally filled by single honorary appointment for outstanding merit in the field of writing. Since the 1980s editors have been annually elected by fellow students as a "ticket" of up to 10 candidates during SRC elections, with two or more groups campaigning for the role. Guest editors will normally be nominated for the annual autonomous editions by the relevant interest groups on campus.

For a time until 1966, editors of the paper were given a yearly scholarship of £100 (roughly equivalent to $2,700 in 2014) by media tycoon Rupert Murdoch, and the SRC began to pay editors a small allowance instead from this point on. Today, editors of Honi Soit receive a fortnightly stipend of $388.06.

Notable past editors include Lex Banning, Bob Ellis, Verity Firth, Laurie Oakes, Kip Williams, Craig Reucassel, and Keith Windschuttle.

== History ==
=== Founding ===
Honi Soit was created in 1929 to counterbalance ongoing criticism of Sydney University's students in the Australian media, which came to a head when students were alleged to have dressed a soldier's statue on the Cenotaph in women's underwear during a graduation festival. The Sydney Morning Herald referred to the incident as a "vulgar desecration", and students were described as "educated louts" for their actions.

A 1929 edition of Honi sought to address the ongoing outrage with the stinging retort:

"We expected gross exaggeration, and even invention, from certain Sydney journals. What we did not expect was that the journals which can generally be relied upon for sane, safe news would also exaggerate and distort in such a manner as to utterly mislead the general public... Even our apology was sneered at. That apology, we might point out, was accepted by the Returned Soldiers' League."

Honi Soit's first edition outlined the paper's editorial position and objectives:

"We are iconoclasts. We do not believe – O Heresy! – that the under-graduate is the most important member of the community. We refuse to pander exclusively to him. Indeed, we will not pander to anyone. We make our appeal also to the great General Public."

Featured in the first edition was a letter to the editor asking whether men should pay women students' tram fares, to which the paper responded that it had "asked several Women Undergrads about it and one has promised to give us her views on the subject. We should also like to hear some Senior Men's views on the same point." Also discussed in the edition were the ethics of advertisement, with the paper being published for free and advertising only "reputable firms whom we can strongly recommend to your custom."

The new paper sought to paint the undergraduate varsity in a more favourable light, giving voice to the student's successes and their progressive opinions.

=== Cultural developments ===
With the onset of the Great Depression, the rise of the labour movement and the growth of the counterculture, Honi's left-wing and often radical voice helped the publication grow from its roots as a small university publication, with the paper and its alumni eventually playing a pivotal role in the culture of both Australia and Britain.

An important line of demarcation for Honi came in the 1960s with editors Richard Walsh and Peter Grose's premature resignation to found Oz magazine, a humorous publication in Australia and (later) Britain which came into conflict with legal authorities in both countries. However, Oz did play a strong role in defining the comedic and radical sensibilities of future generations of Honi.

Honi became intricately associated with the Sydney Push during the 1960s, turning its focus from arts to politics for the first time, and a number of radical editors followed Walsh's tenure.

In 1967 Honi was implicated in the development of the Anti-Vietnam movement in Australia, being blamed for road blockades that led to the infamous "run the bastards over" affair during a visit by American President Lyndon B. Johnson. The paper was described as "filthy and scurrilous" in the Legislative Council of NSW for their stance against the war, and former editor Richard Walsh was denied entry to the United States in 1966 for his outspokenness on the issue. Despite this, the tide of public opinion eventually turned in Honi's favour as the Vietnam War progressed, largely vindicating their editorial position (see Opposition to the Vietnam War, Public opinion).

Being a left-wing student publication also put Honi at the forefront of the counterculture in Australia, with editorial content often directed towards defending the rights of women, Aboriginal Australians, LGBT people, and adherents of communism, at times when such views were still widely controversial.

The radicalism of Honi during the 1960s was not without its consequences. By 1967 the paper found itself without willing advertisers to fund its publication, and faced calls for its disestablishment from members of the University Senate. However the SRC declared the paper had become far too important to let it perish, and provided temporary funding on the condition that the publication be restructured back towards a more traditional newspaper, instating conservative editor Keith Windschuttle to placate critics.

=== Modern day ===
Honi Soit retains its position in the Australian media landscape as a hub of counter-cultural journalism and left-wing activism, though its long list of preeminent alumni and position as a leading student publication have somewhat softened its public image, being described by Peter Fitzsimmons in The Sydney Morning Herald as a "venerable newspaper" in 2013.

The 2013 'Vagina Soit' cover was used by gender equality and gender-based violence advisor Alison Shepherd-Smith in Kenya to raise awareness of female genital mutilation, showing a class of women what a variety of vaginas look like.

In 2026, in the wake of the Cornell University rape allegations, two editors of the paper published an article investigating the handling of reports of sexual assault at the University of Sydney, titled It’s Not Just Cornell: ‘Decades’ of sexual assault at the University of Sydney. Independent Australian news outlets Michael West Media and Cheek Media reported on attempts by University management to intervene in the publication of the article, including the insertion of printed-out University statements in print copies of the newspaper.

=== Alumni ===
Since its inception Honi has been an important training ground for many Australian journalists, politicians, satirist, writers, and entertainers. Former contributors include art critic Robert Hughes, poet Les Murray, film-maker Bruce Beresford, OZ magazine co-founder Richard Walsh, media personality Clive James, feminist Germaine Greer, journalists Bob Ellis, David Solomon and Laurie Oakes, 2021 Kennedy Awards Young Journalist of the Year Natassia Chrysanthos, Prime Minister Malcolm Turnbull, High Court Judge Michael Kirby, author Madeleine St John, historian Keith Windschuttle, theatre director Kip Williams, intellectual Donald Horne, broadcaster Adam Spencer, philosopher George Molnar, various members of comedy troupe The Chaser, and journalist Avani Dias.

Former prime minister Tony Abbott has named Honi Soit as the impetus for his initial entry into politics, having been inspired to begin writing to the paper by a "quirky" edition which "demonstrated how to build a nuclear bomb".

== Controversies ==
As a radically left wing newspaper, Honi Soit has a controversial history dating back to its founding issue. The constant controversy surrounding the paper was lampooned in a 1967 edition which contained a cutout "special libel coupon" that would make it easier for readers to "sue Honi Soit for all it's got (two battered typewriters)".

=== The St Michael's College hoax ===
In 2009 Honi published a feature article, 'The Mystery of St Michael's', later uncovered as a hoax. It claimed a fire in 1992 at St Michael's College, a subsequently-derelict residential college adjacent to the university's Architecture building, had killed 16 students. It was implied that a cover-up by the Catholic Church had stifled widespread awareness of the tragedy. The editors subsequently announced that the story was fictional.

=== 'Vagina Soit' ===
In August 2013, the newspaper made international headlines after printing a cover featuring photographs of 18 vulvae. The newspaper was pulled from stands within hours after it was decided the censoring of the images was not sufficient. This was due to the fact that black bars placed over certain parts of the vulvae were not completely opaque.

A statement released by the women editors stated "We are tired of society giving us a myriad of things to feel about our own bodies. We are tired of having to attach anxiety to our vaginas. We are tired of vaginas being either artificially sexualised (porn) or stigmatised (censorship and airbrushing). We are tired of being pressured to be sexual, and then being shamed for being sexual."

=== Allegations against Tony Abbott ===
The paper became a point of contention in the lead up to the 2013 Australian federal election, as a standing record of the allegedly violent and anti-social conduct of opposition leader Tony Abbott during his time at university.

=== ANZAC Day criticism ===
In 1958 Honi caused a media outrage over a story calling for the end of the ANZAC Day holiday. The paper argued that the national holiday was no longer treated as a veneration to the casualties of war, but rather as a national celebration and an excuse for inebriation, backing up the claims with photographs of drunken revellers at memorial events. Despite widespread calls from the media for the editor to be sacked, the SRC resisted. The affair was the basis for the play The One Day of the Year by Alan Seymour.

A report by the Department of Veterans' Affairs in 2012 found the prevailing public sentiment to agree with the allegations made by Honi, with participants stating the "excessive use of alcohol and 'yobbo' behavior... detract from the original spirit of the day and negatively impact on the veteran commemorations".

=== Pro-North Korea article ===
In August 2018, Honi gained media attention when it emerged that they had published an article by former University of Sydney lecturer Jay Tharappel, which praised the regime in North Korea. Tharappel's article claimed that North Korea was an "egalitarian" society, which was benefiting from the "past sacrifice" of its citizens and remained "necessarily authoritarian" due to its antagonism with the United States.

The article drew further criticism from Jewish organisations, after it became known that Tharappel had engaged in alleged antisemitic behaviour. This included making comments on Facebook expressing uncertainty about the scale of the Holocaust and wearing a jacket patch signifying support for the Houthis in Yemen, with the words "Curse on the Jews" in Arabic. The editors refused to retract the article.

=== Pro-intifada article and allegations of antisemitism ===
In 2026, the annual queer edition published by the Queer Action Collective featured an article titled, 'Who’s Afraid of Hezbollah/Houthis/Hamas/Islamic Jihad?' With reference to the Israeli–Palestinian conflict, the author declared, "The resistance deserves our unconditional support until victory," and, "Glory to all our martyrs. From Gadigal to Gaza, we’ll have an Intifada." The piece described 7 October 2023, on which Hamas led a series of coordinated attacks on Israelis, as the beginning of "Gaza’s Holocaust," expressed support for an academic dismissed after disrupting a Jewish event and identified "the police, Labor, Zionism and Israel" as a "common enemy". The 7 October attacks saw extensive massacres and sexual violence.

Widespread condemnation followed, including from New South Wales premier Chris Minns. The Australasian Union of Jewish Students decried "the promotion of designated terrorist organisations in a student publication funded by student fees." Its advocacy and public relations head Liat Granot said that "Jewish students deserve to feel safe on their own campus. A student newspaper that closes its articles with calls for intifada and glory to martyrs is telling them they don’t." The union's University of Sydney branch stated that it was "appalled to once again see Honi Soit lend itself to violent and extremist ideology." It added that "Jewish students at this university have run out of patience for the cycle of incident, condemnation and no consequence." Commonwealth education minister Jason Clare referred the article to the Tertiary Education Quality and Standards Agency.

Honi Soit's editors stated that the article was in "an autonomous edition of Honi, meaning we did not edit it. As we were not involved in the editorial processes of this edition, this is a question for the editorial team." The university directed Honi to withdraw the article and said it would strengthen its oversight of the paper, deeming it "completely unacceptable this article was published."

=== Other controversies ===
In 1945, the Christian Societies of the university drew media attention after they called for the paper's editors to be sacked for publishing information about birth control, and for misquoting the Bible. These complaints were supported by the then Rector of St John's College who suggested its distributors be arrested, though police did not pursue the matter.

In 1950, printers Consolidated Press refused to produce an edition of Honi due to an article relating to an employee of the Commonwealth Police (now the Australian Security Intelligence Organisation and the Australian Federal Police), for fear it constituted a breach of national security.

In 1952, fights broke out at Sydney University, including in the Honi Soit office, after the newspaper published reports of drunkenness and savage hazing rituals at the university's ecclesiastical colleges. The brawls were caused by members of the colleges attempting to remove the paper from circulation, going so far as to chase a truck delivering copies out of the university grounds. Police were eventually called in to control the situation.

In 1970, Honi published confidential intelligence files that showed the Australian Security Intelligence Organisation had blocked the appointment of one of its former editors, Hall Greenland, from a job in the public service. Greenland went on to become a Walkley Award-winning journalist.

Honi Soit was frequently in conflict with the police from the 1950s through to the 1970s for publication of what was considered indecent material, generally depicting nudity or erotica in various forms, often published to specifically antagonise the authorities. Having won over public opinion by the mid 1970s, Honi continued its practice of occasionally featuring nudity up until the 1990s with little interference.

In 1995, the editors (including The Chaser's Charles Firth) used their colour pages to create an advertisement for Union Board candidate Nick Purtell. The editors were fined $360 (the cost of an advertisement) and asked to apologise for the misuse of advertising space. The editors printed an apology in size 4 font, then ran a full page ad in support of their actions. Mr Purtell did not manage to get elected. This incident was recalled by Charles Firth in the ABC documentary Uni.

In 1995, Honi Soit reprinted a controversial article from Rabelais Student Media, its La Trobe University counterpart, entitled "The Art of Shoplifting"—one of seven student newspapers to do so in the wake of Rabelais editors being prosecuted by state censors.

In their last edition for 2005, the editors produced "Hx", an imitation of the free "Mx" tabloid. They used their colour pages to present a biting satire of quality commercial media, with rarely seen images of dead and wounded Iraqis juxtaposed against vacuous magazine style copy, such as "Fashion From the Front Line". The inclusion of images of dead and mutilated civilian casualties shocked many readers. This same year the paper was accused of having turned from its radical roots by comedian Jonathan Biggins after it published a critical recap of his Wharf Revue.

De-classified U.S. National Security Agency documents were published by Honi in 2013, which showed the paper had been suspected by intelligence agencies of operating under Soviet influence.

In 2016, the editors produced a satire spoof of broadsheet newspaper The Australian for their last edition for the year. The issue, complete with replica masthead, featured a front-page splash about Rupert Murdoch dying and satirical parody opinion pieces from journalists at the paper. The prank was acknowledged by The Australian's CEO Nicholas Gray.

In 2018, the annual women's edition featured Syrian suicide bomber Hamida Mustafa al-Tahir, a member of the Ba’ath Party, on its cover. Al-Tahir targeted Israeli intelligence agents and Southern Lebanon Army troops; estimates of the casualties vary, with at least twenty killed or wounded, whilst some media reports stated that over 50 died.

Following the death of Queen Elizabeth II in September 2022, Honi Soit published a print edition featuring a photoshopped image of the late Queen in a morgue, with the headline "Queen Dead, Charles Next." The edition garnered national attention and condemnation, being described as "offensive and disgraceful". The editors refused to apologise for their conduct, claiming that they "did not think [they] should have acted with more sensitivity".

On Tuesday 16 May 2023, hundreds of copies of Queer Honi, the annual autonomous edition of Honi Soit produced by the Queer Action Collective, were stolen from stands. Hundreds more were taken the following day. Honi Soit estimated that nearly a thousand copies were stolen, almost half of the paper's print run. Honi noted that, with "the paper's masthead being "Fagi Soit" and featuring a cover image of a trans woman's torso tattooed with slurs, the theft is, in Honi's view, a targeted attack against queer expression."

In June 2025, Honi Soit withdrew an invitation to news.com.au political editor Samantha Maiden, who had been scheduled as a keynote speaker for its Student Journalism Conference in August of that year. The editors told her by email that they had "received community concerns about your political coverage and reporting on the Palestinian genocide" – the Gaza war was ongoing; a United Nations commission found later that year that a genocide was taking place. In response, Maiden wrote that she did not "recall writing anything about Palestine recently at all, let alone anything controversial," and that it should not matter. Following Maiden's removal, journalist David Marr withdrew from the event in solidarity, expressing concern about the exclusion of differing perspectives from the conference. An Honi Soit editor wrote in an October 2025 piece that "Honi does not believe in platforming those who contribute to the institutional failure to speak up for Palestine."
