= Eureka Youth League =

Political youth organisation and heritage-list camp in Melbourne, Victoria, Australia

Eureka Youth League (Note: The youth organisation of the party went by numerous names throughout its existence, however it held the name Eureka Youth League for the longest period: twenty-seven years.)
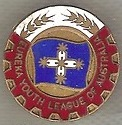
- Founded: 1923 (as the Young Communist League)
- Dissolved: 1984 (as the Young Socialist League)
- Merged into: Left Alliance
- Ideology: Communism; Marxism–Leninism; Factions: Marxist feminism
- Colours: Red
- Mother party: Communist Party of Australia
- International affiliation: World Federation of Democratic Youth (WFDY)
- Newspaper: The Young Worker (YCL); Youth Voice (EYL)

The Eureka Youth League (EYL) was a socialist youth group of the Communist Party of Australia (CPA), formed in 1923 and dissolved in 1984. At various times during this period, the organisation had several different names, including the Young Communist League (YCL); the Young Comrades Club (YCC); the League of Young Democrats (LYD); and lastly the Young Socialist League (YSL), which in 1984 became part of the Left Alliance.

From 1946 until its demise in 1968, the Eureka Youth League operated Camp Eureka, a heritage-listed bush camp, located at 90–100 Tarrango Road, Yarra Junction, in the Yarra Ranges, in the north eastern suburbs of Melbourne, in Victoria, Australia. The 7.5-hectare (19-acre) camp is now maintained by the Camp Eureka Working Collective and supported by Friends of Camp Eureka, as an historic and usable camp for up to 32 people, on the traditional lands of the Wurundjeri people.

== Socialist youth wing ==
=== History ===
The youth wing of CPA worked under several different names in different periods from the 1920s onwards, including the Young Communist League (YCL), which was founded in 1923, with Audrey Blake elected as the inaugural Victorian state secretary. The YCL published its own newspaper, The Young Worker.

The Young Comrades Club (YCC) was founded in 1927. At a meeting in Melbourne in 1937 attended by 1,500 people, the YCL changed its name to the League of Young Democrats (LYD). After the LYD was banned by the Menzies government in 1941, the Eureka Youth League (EYL) was established in December of that year, whose membership grew to 1,000 with a year. The EYL published a newspaper called Youth Voice, and undertook activities relating to World War II and the working and living conditions of young people, as well as the peace movement during this war and the Korean War later. In 1952 it held the "Youth Carnival for Peace and Friendship" in Sydney, attracting 30,000 attendees. EYL opposed the introduction of National Service in Australia in the 1950s. The EYL was active during the centenary celebrations of the Eureka Stockade, held in Ballarat in 1954.

The Eureka Youth League also had an important role in the early promotion of jazz music in Australia in the 1940s under the leadership of Harry Stein.

EYL collaborated with the Australian Council of Trade Unions (ACTU) and helped to arrange its Youth Weeks, and also ran youth camps across Australia, attended by thousands of young people. It protested the Vietnam War actively, but by 1968 membership had declined, and a change of name to the Young Socialist League did not last long.

The Eureka Youth League was a founding member of the World Federation of Democratic Youth, a membership later taken over by the Young Communist Movement. In 1984 (or 1987?) the Young Socialist League became part of Left Alliance.

== Camp ==
Camp Eureka
- Location of the camp in Victoria
- Interactive map of the Camp Eureka area

General information
- Status: Completed
- Type: Camp
- Architectural style: Rustic bush style
- Location: 90–100 Tarrango Road, Yarra Junction, Yarra Ranges, Victoria, Australia
- Coordinates: 37°47′24″S 145°38′23″E
- Year built: 1945–1946
- Completed: 1946
- Opened: 23 December 1946; 79 years ago

Technical details
- Structural system: Timber pile
- Material: Timber; corrugated iron; salvaged materials; stone
- Grounds: 7.5 ha (19 acres)

Website
- campeureka.org.au

Victorian Heritage Register
- Official name: Camp Eureka
- Type: Registered place
- Reference no.: H1981
- Heritage overlay no.: HO88
- Category: Recreation and Entertainment

Register of the National Estate
- Official name: Camp Eureka
- Type: Defunct register
- Designated: undated
- Reference no.: 103729

Camp Eureka is the last surviving campsite in Australia used by the Eureka Communist League. The campsite in the Yarra Ranges was originally a farmhouse, of which only the barn remains. The land was given to the Eureka Communist League in 1945. Located in a bushland setting, when the site was first used as a camp in December 1946 it had been substantially cleared. Since then every effort has been made to enhance the natural elements of the site including the planting of native trees and the revegetation the site.

Camp Eureka was added to the Victorian Heritage Register on 21 March 2002 in recognition of its historical, social, architectural, and archaeological significance; and, on unknown dates, was also added to non-statutory lists by the Victorian branch of the National Trust and the now defunct Register of the National Estate.

=== History ===
The Eureka Youth League was formed in 1941 as a successor to a number of other bodies associated with the Communist Party. Its predecessor's had organised camps throughout the 1920s and 1930s to Phillip Island and Rosebud. The EYL ran camps at Corrimal, in the Illawarra and Springwood, in the Blue Mountains regions of New South Wales; in Maroochydore and Caloundra, in Queensland; and in Victoria, in Healesville over the summer of 1944.

A December 1946 article in The Guardian, the official communist newspaper, announced that the first holiday camp would be held at Camp Eureka from 23 December 1946 to 5 January 1947. The campers would enjoy hikes, sports days, volley and basket ball, dancing, concerts and film screenings. The films were provided by the Realist Film Unit who, while providing documentaries, also screened Charlie Chaplin films. Camp members were to provide a days labour and contribute to the construction of the camp. The shared work ethic, the design of the buildings and the general philosophy that was found in the camp was an important component in left wing thinking and in particular offered a place of refuge and company for like minded souls during the Cold War period.

However, development of the camp was halted by government authorities on various occasions as construction permits had not been obtained.

Until the mid-1950s large numbers, up to 1,000, attended the camp at Christmas and Easter. Amongst those attending the camp in this period was cartoonist Noel Counihan, jazz musicians Graeme Bell AO MBE and Fred Johnston, and the author Frank Hardy, who completed the novel Power Without Glory at the camp in 1949.

By the late 1960s the site was largely abandoned and the Eureka Youth League had ceased to exist. The early 1970s, former campers returned to the site and determined that the site could be refurbished and reused as a holiday destination again. A collective was formed and slowly the buildings were renewed as before, by volunteer labour. Since the demise of the EYL, the camp has been used by unionists, activists, environmentalists, student organisations, and like-minded groups.

=== Description ===
The site plan and buildings date from the period of 1946 to the early 1950s. Camp members built a number of huts for accommodation, a recreation hut, and toilet and shower blocks. Building construction was from salvaged materials and were designed with a simple, rustic look.

The largest of the huts is the mess hut, open on three sides with a corrugated iron roof and bush-pole support. This area was used for dining as well as concerts with a small stage at the closed end of the building. Its construction and design was influenced by the experience of members during World War II. Nearby are the kitchen and the recreation hut. The recreation hut boasts a large fireplace faced with stone on the exterior, the rest of the building is of timber construction. Smaller huts, suitable for accommodation, are scattered about the site. The most significant of these is the model hut (so called as it was to serve as a model for other huts on the site) and the medical hut. The medical hut is surprisingly intact and retains many of its features from when it was used as a clinic during the camp's heyday. It too, is of simple bush pole-frame construction and malthoid over palings.

== See also ==
- List of places on the Victorian Heritage Register in the Shire of Yarra Ranges
- List of youth wings of political parties in Australia
- Socialism in Australia
