= John David Blake =

- Born: Alfred Airey; 25 May 1909; Newcastle-upon-Tyne, England
- Died: 1 October 2000 (aged 91); Leichhardt, Sydney, Australia
- Other name: Jack Blake
- Notable work: Revolution from Within: A Contemporary Theory of Social Change (1971)
- Political party: Communist Party of Australia
- Spouse: Audrey Elsie Blake

John David Blake (1909–2000) was a trade union organiser, newspaper editor, and a high ranking personality within the Communist Party of Australia.

== Background ==
He was born on the 5 May 1909 in Newcastle upon Tyne as "Alfred Airey". Later in life he changed his name to "John David Blake" by deed poll, but went more commonly by the name Jack Blake.

He and his family migrate from England to Australia in 1922 where Blake would spend the rest of his life. Between 1923 and 1930 he worked in the State coalmine at Lithgow, New South Wales where he was an active trade unionist.

== Activism ==
During the 1930s he was a graduate of the Soviet Union's (USSR) International Lenin School, and travelled extensively across the USSR during the same decade. He was also married to the communist activist and trade unionist Audrey Elsie Boyd (1916–2006), and was also an editor for the communist party newspaper, Workers’ Voice (later renamed Guardian).

In 1940 his house was raised by the Commonwealth Investigation Branch who seized 140 books from his house. In the early 1950s a spy working for the Australian Security and Intelligence Organization, noted that Blake was one of the central figures in the leadership of the Communist Party of Australia.

Later in life he was awarded a research grant which led to the creation of his book Revolution from Within: A Contemporary Theory of Social Change (1971).

== Additional sources ==
- Phillip Deery. The Sickle and the Scythe: Jack Blake and Communist Party ‘Consolidation’, 1949–56. Labour History: A Journal of Labour and Social History. Number 80.
