= Student Unity =

Student Unity (also known as SU or simply Unity) is a factional grouping within the Australian National Union of Students (NUS). It is politically aligned towards the Right or Labor Unity faction of the Australian Labor Party, in contrast to the National Labor Students faction, which is aligned to the Left. Student Unity usually represents itself by means of a yin-yang logo, representing its position as the centre of the Australian political spectrum.

The faction views itself as being committed to both fiscal responsibility and lobbying for progressive causes, while its more left-wing opponents are critical of the faction's approach to social policy and view the faction as conservative and machinist.

== Student Unity Policy ==
Aware of the financial collapse of NUS's forerunner, the Australian Union of Students, the faction's policy places particular emphasis on financial management and administration. The faction often votes against motions supporting issues that do not directly affect students or are felt to be too radical. Its belief is that the primary focus of the NUS should be issues directly relevant to students, and that pursuing advocacy on other, less student-specific causes would be an inappropriate use of NUS funds.

Student Unity policy is generally consistent with the policies of the Right faction of the Australian Labor Party, holding positions generally in favour of private education, Social Democracy and mixed public/private health care. Among the Labor student factions it is the only faction to support HECS.

Critics of the faction argue that this leads to support of moral and social conservatism, but the faction argues that it allows the faction to unite moderate and progressive students under a single banner without splitting the faction on issues that are not critical to student services.

== History ==
The faction formed in 1991, when David Feeney led members of the Labor Right to split with the Labor Left caucus, electing Pablo Campillos as NUS General Secretary, and refusing to back future Australian Democrats leader Natasha Stott Despoja for President of the Union.

Since then, Unity has become one of the biggest factions in NUS, with a presence in most Australian states and territories.

Until 2006, the faction had successfully retained the position of NUS National General Secretary every year since its inception, due to a 'sweetheart' deal with the former National Organisation of Labor Students caucus. At the 2006 Conference, the faction failed to obtain the position of General Secretary for the first time in its history, the position going to an independent.

However at the 2007 Conference, Student Unity produced a strong 33% of the national delegate vote and succeeded in electing a General Secretary, thus returning Student Unity to a significant role in NUS for the 2008.

== List of NUS National Office Bearers from Student Unity ==
2011

- Patrick Sheehan, General Secretary from La Trobe University
- Chris Monnox, Welfare Officer from University of Wollongong
- Liv Hopkins, Queer Officer from University of Sydney
- Gen Li, Ethnocultural Officer from Monash University - Caulfield
- Christian Jones, Environment Officer from University of Sydney
2001 - 2010

2010

- Xavier Williams, General Secretary from La Trobe University
- Patrick Sheehan, Welfare Officer from La Trobe University (resigned)
- Michael Buckland, Welfare Officer from University of Sydney
- James Wangmann, Small and Regional Campus Officer from University of South Australia
- Lauren Fernando, Ethnocultural Officer from Victoria University
- Hugh Mortensen, Environment Officer from Swinburne University

2009

- David Wilkins, General Secretary from University of Adelaide
- Jimmy Mentor, Welfare Officer from Monash University.
- Chaiy Donati, Small and Regional Campus Officer from University of Queensland
- Matt Incerti, Ethnocultural Officer from University of Melbourne

2008

- Ben Maxfield, General Secretary from Monash University
- Liz Larbalestier, Welfare Officer from University of Wollongong.
- Grant Machell, Small and Regional Campus Officer from Monash University

2007

- Josh Rayner, Welfare Officer from the University of Adelaide
- Jamila Rizvi (resigned), Ethnocultural Officer from Australian National University.

2006

- Michael de Bruyn, General Secretary from University of Melbourne

2005

- Sacha Fenton, General Secretary from University of Queensland.
- Katana Smith, Welfare / Small and Regional Campus Officer from Flinders University.

2004

- Daniel Mookhey, General Secretary from University of Technology, Sydney
- Lambros Tapinos, Welfare / Small & Regional Campus Officer from Victoria University.

2003

- Michael Comninos, General Secretary from University of Sydney.
- Belinda Clark, Queer Officer from Curtin University.

2002

- Dave Hughes, General Secretary from the University of New South Wales.

2001

- Lizzie Blandthorn, General Secretary from University of Melbourne
- Rachel Thomson, Welfare / Small & Regional Campus Officer from University of Tasmania.
1991 - 2000

2000

- Simon Lees, General Secretary from University of Sydney.
- Charlie Heuston, Education Officer from Flinders University.

1999

- Gilbert Astorga, General Secretary from University of Tasmania.
- Tom Cargill, Welfare / Small & Regional Campus Officer from Flinders University.

1998

- Erica Martin, General Secretary from Murdoch University.

1997

- Chris Burrell, General Secretary from Australian Maritime College.

1996

- Roland Stephens, General Secretary from University of Sydney.

1995

- Michael Gadiel, General Secretary from University of Sydney.
- Michelle MacDonald, Women's Officer from La Trobe University.

1994

- Wendy Haydon, General Secretary from James Cook University.
- Tim Lyons, Education Officer from University of Tasmania.

1993

- Simon Hoffman, General Secretary from University of Western Australia.

1992

- Pablo Campillos, General Secretary from Curtin University.
