= 1996 Australian Labor Party leadership election =

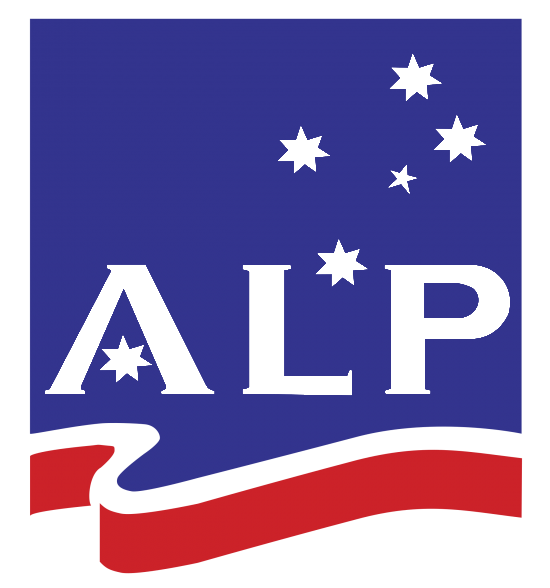
- 19 March 1996
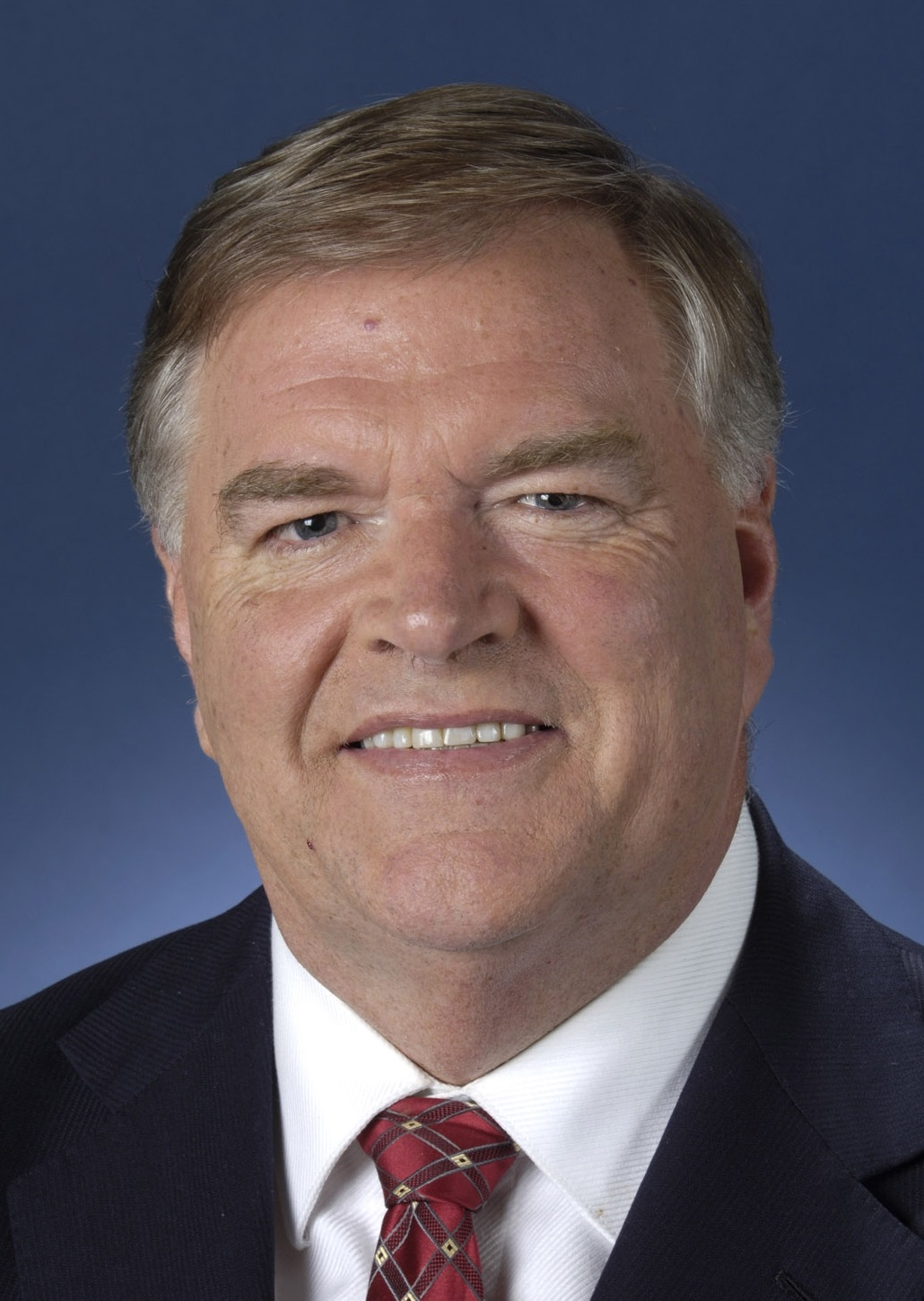
Candidate	Kim Beazley
Caucus vote	Unopposed
Leader before election
Paul Keating
Elected Leader
Kim Beazley

The Australian Labor Party held a leadership election on 19 March 1996, following the resignation of Paul Keating after the party's defeat at the 1996 federal election. Kim Beazley was elected unopposed as Keating's replacement, thus becoming Leader of the Opposition.

== Background ==
Speculation about Keating's successor began midway through his second term in office, as a result of consistently poor polling. Finance Minister Kim Beazley, Health Minister Carmen Lawrence, Foreign Minister Gareth Evans, and Employment Minister Simon Crean were all reported as possible contenders at various stages. In June 1995, deputy leader Brian Howe announced his resignation. Beazley was elected unopposed as his replacement, thus becoming Deputy Prime Minister of Australia. Keating then endorsed Beazley as his own eventual successor, stating that he was "the obvious person in the long run". It was reported that Carmen Lawrence was the preferred candidate of Howe's Labor Left faction for the deputy leadership, but that she chose not to stand because she did not have the numbers in the caucus as a whole. Her position was thought to have been damaged by an ongoing Western Australian royal commission into her role in the Easton affair.

In April 1995, opinion polling by AGB McNair on behalf of The Sydney Morning Herald had Gareth Evans (20 percent), Carmen Lawrence (18 percent), Kim Beazley (13 percent), and Simon Crean (8 percent) as the favourites to succeed Paul Keating as Labor leader, although 31 percent of respondents were unsure. By July 1995, the same polling firm had Beazley on 27 percent, followed by Lawrence (19 percent), Evans (10 percent), and Crean (9 percent).

Keating announced he would resign as Labor leader on the night of 2 March 1996, when it became clear that Labor had lost the federal election to John Howard's Coalition. By the following week, it was correctly being reported that Beazley would be elected unopposed as his successor when the Labor caucus met on 19 March. However, there was initially some concern that he would not win his seat, the Division of Brand in Western Australia – his final margin of victory was only 387 votes.

== Candidates ==
- Kim Beazley, incumbent Deputy Leader, former Minister for Finance, Member for Brand

== Potential candidates who declined to run ==
- Simon Crean, former Minister for Employment, Education and Training, Member for Hotham
- Gareth Evans, former Minister for Foreign Affairs, Member for Holt
- Carmen Lawrence, former Minister for Human Services and Health, Member for Fremantle

== Results ==
Australian Labor Party Deputy Leadership election, 1996
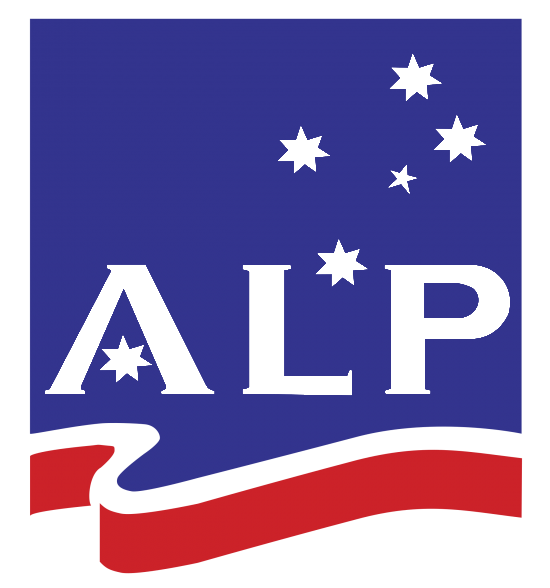

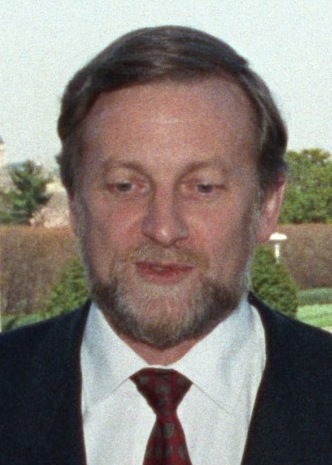

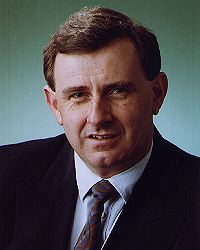
Candidate	Gareth Evans	Simon Crean
Caucus vote	42 (52.2%)	37 (46.8%)
Deputy Leader before election
Kim Beazley
Deputy Leader
after election
Gareth Evans

In the lead-up to the caucus meeting, most media attention was given to who would be the party's new deputy leader. Gareth Evans eventually defeated Simon Crean by 42 votes to 37.

=== Deputy leadership ballot ===
Candidate	Final ballot	%
Gareth Evans	42	52.2
Simon Crean	37	46.8

== Aftermath ==
After Labor nearly won the 1998 federal election Gareth Evans stood down as deputy leader being replaced by Simon Crean.
