= Audrey Blake =

Australian writer and political activist

Audrey Elsie Blake
- Born: Audrey Elsie Boyd; 9 August 1916; South Melbourne
- Died: 1 November 2006 (aged 90); Neutral Bay, Australia
- Notable work: A Proletarian Life (1984)
- Political party: Communist Party of Australia

Audrey Elsie Blake (1916–2006) was an Australian writer, activist, and a member of the Communist Party of Australia. She was the first Secretary of the Eureka Youth League, and was also the wife of Australian activist John David Blake (aka Jack Blake).

== Early and personal life ==
Audrey Elsie Blake (née Boyd) was born on 9 August 1916 in South Melbourne, Australia, as the second of six children belonging to working-class parents. Audrey was educated at Albert Park State School, Middle Park Central School. At the age of 14, she transferred to Melbourne Girls’ High School. In 1930, she became an atheist. She married the communist party activist John David Blake and in 1934, she gave birth to a daughter.

== Political activism ==
As a teenager, Audrey joined the Friends of the Soviet Union in 1931. Then in 1932, at the age of 15, she joined a group called the Young Communist League (YCL). In 1933, Audrey became a member of the Communist Party of Australia (CPA) under the pseudonym "Elsie Forbes". In 1934, she was elected to the CPA'S State committee.

=== House raid ===
On the 15 June 1940, the CPA was outlawed by the Australian government and her home was raided by the Commonwealth Investigation Branch, and Audrey and her family went into hiding. The CPA was then made legal again in 1942.

=== Post 1942 activism ===
Audrey was considered as a key member in the organisation of the CPA, especially their youth wing the Eureka Youth League. In 1944, Audrey became the national secretary of the Eureka Youth League and the editor of their publication Youth Voice. In 1949, she spent six months touring eastern European socialist countries and attended the World Federation of Democratic Youth in Budapest. In 1952, she played a key role in the organisation of the Sydney Youth Carnival for Peace and Friendship. Later in life, she became a full-time worker for the CPA central committee.

=== Post CPA activism ===
Audrey resigned from her positions within the CPA in 1955. She left the CPA in 1966. Audrey's memoirs were titled A Proletarian Life (1984). She was also featured in the documentary Red Matildas (1984).

== Death and legacy ==
Audrey Blake died on the 1 November 2006 at Neutral Bay, Australia. She was survived by her daughter Jan, four grandchildren, and nine-great-grandchildren. Audrey was 90 years old when she died. Her body was cremated.

Blake is the writer of a history of the Eureka Youth League, a copy of which can be found in the University of Melbourne Archives.

Additional information on Audrey's life can be found in the National Archives of Australia.
