= Activism at Ohio Wesleyan University =

Activism has played an important role in the history of Ohio Wesleyan University; The founders of Ohio Wesleyan University expressed a hope that the university "is forever to be conducted on the most liberal principles." OWU has espoused activism in its academic philosophy. Alumni of the school have prominently engaged in controversial issues of their times on three central issues—the scope of justice; distributive justice based on race, gender, and income; and institutions related to preserving social structures.

== Early history ==
The River-to-Lake-Freedom Trail used for transporting slaves generally follows the present-day alignment of U.S. Route 23.

On August 5, 1846, the university's first president, Edward Thomson, delivered his inaugural address. He maintained that the college was a product of the liberality of the people of Delaware, and it was fortunate that Ohio Wesleyan was founded in a community divided in religious and political opinions; Thomson believed that the friction of a mixed society prevented dogmatism and developed energy. The spirit of the college, he said, is the spirit of liberty.

Thomson stated in the early days of Wesleyan that a college education should be a barrier to avarice by furnishing "the understanding, the taste, and the perspective that directs us to life's higher purposes ... It would serve political tranquillity, both by accrediting the truly apt candidates for office and by creating citizenry astutely able to assert its liberty against any government's tendency to encroach".

Thomson was frequently vocal in the national political debates of his time, notably slavery and the expansion of the United States. In 1857 he denounced the argument that southern Christians The Underground Railroad, used as a "transportation system" for anti-slavery activists to free black slaves fleeing from the South to Canada, was extensively utilized in Ohio. In the 19th century, Ohio had one of the most active Underground Railroad operations in the nation. One of the state's most frequently used corridors on the Underground Railroad passed through Delaware County near Ohio Wesleyan University, now marked along the bikeway trail at U.S. Routes 23 and 36 in the city of Delaware.

Elizabeth Boynton Harbert (class of 1864), a women's suffrage activist, published several books on women's issues and suffrage, Out of Her Sphere and The Woman's Kingdom, and was the chief editor of a women's suffrage newspaper, The New Era, in 1885 Despite women's suffrage being a controversial issue, Harbert became an associate president of the World's Unity League, vice-president of the Woman's Civic League of Pasadena, vice-president of the Southern California Woman's Press Association, and president of the National Household Economic Association.

== Early 20th century: the effect of wars and politics ==
Branch Rickey, a 1903 graduate of Ohio Wesleyan, is regarded as a significant figure in the history of professional baseball for breaking the sport's racial barrier. A racial incident early in Rickey's life when he was as a baseball coach for Ohio Wesleyan in 1910 would play an important role in his decision thirty years later. Rickey's team visited a hotel in South Bend, Indiana, where the hotel manager refused to provide a room for Rickey's black baseball player Charley Thomas. Rickey eventually convinced the manager to allow him to share his own room with Thomas. Rickey recalled Thomas rubbing at his hands, ashamed of the color of his skin and vowed, "Charley, the day will come when they won't have to be white." In 1943 Rickey became president and general manager of the Brooklyn Dodgers. Beginning with the 1946 signing of African American player Jackie Robinson for the Dodgers, Rickey became renowned for his role in the racial integration of the game. Rickey's feelings on integration were a primary motivating factor in his decision.

It is not the honor that you take with you, but the heritage you leave behind.

— Branch Rickey, OWU class of 1904, former owner of the Brooklyn Dodger Baseball team known for breaking the racial barrier in the sport.

In the war years of 1917–1919, the break between the United States and Germany struck a military tone on campus. Individual students were volunteering in the Marines, in the Canadian Forces, and other forms of service. As America entered World War I the U.S. War Department inaugurated the Students' Army Training Corps, a program designed to use existing colleges and universities as training facilities for new military personnel. On the morning of October 1, 1918, about 150,000 college boys on US campuses transformed into student soldiers. This was the induction into the Students' Army Training Corps. In Delaware, on campus, approximately 400 students were given the oath of allegiance. The men received the regular army training and academic instruction prescribed by the Committee on Education and Special Training of the War Department. The mode of student activities changed: campus traditions were put aside, and athletic events were cancelled throughout the fall semester of 1918.

== Campus climate in the swinging sixties ==
In 1966, students established an Upward Bound program, funded by the Economic Opportunity Act of 1964, to help prepare students from lower-income and poverty areas for college. The Arts Castle, the Early Childhood Center, the Big Pal/Little Pal Program, the Andrews House, the Office of Community Service, and the International Ambassador High School Program are among the many programs founded since the 1970s to provide services to the larger community in Delaware.

Elden Smith, Wesleyan's 11th president, appointed a commission in 1968 to study student life and to refine and further edit Wesleyan's previously too-broad Statement of Aims. The commission's report recommended four criteria that OWU's educators should foster: perception, critical judgement, enjoyment, and active responsibility for the problems of society. On "active responsibility for the problems of society", the report stated, "A socially concerned individual who had no capacity for enjoyment, who exercised glib and trite rather than critical judgement, and who had no perception of reality, would be a public menace. Perhaps this is the meaning of 'do-gooder'. On the other hand, the absence of active responsibility for social problems might degenerate into obsession with self, and that perception might become dilettantism."

In 1969, the Commission on Student Life drafted a new form of student life. It formed the Wesleyan Council of Student Affairs (WCSA) with the right to decide basic policies on matters related to student life. The group was controversial from the start: more than two hundred students held a sit-in at the student union to gain faculty approval for issues-oriented representation. WCSA became involved in the first major controversy on the Wesleyan campus in the 1960s: its representatives called for the elimination of academic credit and existence for ROTC and demanded access to the university's budget and general financial statements.

== Vietnam War and Wenzlau controversy ==
The escalation of the Vietnam War in the early 1960s had a significant impact on Ohio Wesleyan students. A small minority had been concerned with the war for several years, but the bombing of North Vietnam and the Gulf of Tonkin Resolution in August 1964 raised campus-wide awareness almost overnight. The Vietnam War, so distant, became a huge presence on campus, affected ideas of community, student power, and free speech, and influenced daily decisions like class choices and social interactions. The first stirrings of protest against the war occurred in late 1964. In December, the Wesleyan Council of Student Affairs voted to send a letter to President Lyndon B. Johnson opposing the expansion of the war and advocating withdrawal. Opposing expansion was a fairly moderate position, but calling for withdrawal was much more radical.

Wesleyan was the first college campus in the country to demonstrate against President Richard Nixon's decision to invade Cambodia on April 30, 1970. Following the demonstration, two hundred students occupied the Air Force ROTC building on campus to protest both the war and the awarding of academic credit for ROTC participation. The ROTC was seen as an extension of the "Pentagon's war machine."

President Wenzlau, then the president of OWU, in late morning of Friday, May 1 entered the ROTC building to engage protestors. He pointed out that OWU ROTC files had been thrown into the swimming pool and mentioned that he did not want to get the National Guard involved. He urged the protesters that they leave the ROTC building. After an hour of debate, Wenzlau suggested that the protesters vote on whether to stay or retreat. The vote was nearly a tie but there was a one vote margin in favor of the protesters leaving the building. That afternoon, students at OWU demanded that the school hold a campus referendum on the issue of ROTC campus disbandment and that the vote be binding on university policy. The Kent State ROTC building burned to the ground the next evening and four were killed at Kent State by National Guardsmen the following Monday.

Wenzlau called for an emergency faculty meeting on May 1, 1970. The faculty body, surrounded by more than 300 students, decided to hold a faculty meeting later in the month when the entire faculty body would be present. The faculty meeting authorized sending a telegram to Nixon demanding an immediate unilateral cease-fire for all US troops in Cambodia, Laos, and Vietnam.

The student referendum was held on May 22, 1970. The student body was split on the issue of ROTC, while 67 percent voted to censure the Vietnam War.

== Involvement in college affairs in the 1970s ==
OWU students continued to demand more say in university affairs, in addition to making a strong stand on national issues. The Wesleyan Council for Student Affairs and the administration battled over appropriate wording for alcohol and visitation policies. Several hundred students staged a "drink-in" at the MUB (the student union) in 1971. In the spring of 1971, students set up a tent community called "The People's Park" in front of Sturges Hall to protest housing policies. Students became involved in decisions on several faculty tenure denials, the academic schedule, and plans for a new gymnasium. Starting in 1970, the Board of Trustees approved a student seat on its board, which was to be filled every three years.

== On racial equality again ==
Mary King, class of 1963, worked alongside the Reverend Dr. Martin Luther King Jr. in the U.S. civil rights movement when she was a young student, and was a member of the staff of the Student Nonviolent Coordinating Committee (SNCC).

The resurgence of campus activism regarding racism existing elsewhere in the world came in response to David Warren's, the 13th president, involvement in the issue. In his inauguration Warren stated: "If there is one phrase which I believe best characterizes our Wesleyan education, it is: 'Here I stand.' Within these three words of Martin Luther—'Here I stand'—is compressed the whole of our historical endeavor..."

In the 1980s the most organized campus movement was against investments in companies doing business in South Africa. By February 1987, student political action had brought Ohio Wesleyan to pledge to fully divest any holdings connected to South Africa. The OWU Committee on Divestment was organized in 1988 and funded many activities related to its cause. It sponsored an Anti-Apartheid Week, candlelight vigils, and protest marches. One event which drew a lot of media attention was the 1988 demonstration before the Board of Trustees. Students carried a black and white paper chain as they climbed up the student union ballroom. As their leader announced "Divest!", students broke the symbolic paper chain.

== Recent activism ==
Ohio Wesleyan students Barbara Eldredge and Kit McCann make a social and artistic statement on the steps of the Hamilton-Williams Campus Center.

Recent years have witnessed activism by student groups on the issues of the Iraq War, race, globalization, and women's reproductive rights.

In April 2002 about a hundred Wesleyan students gathered on The Mall in Washington, D.C. during a weekend of protests for an array of causes, including the Middle East crisis, and also to denounce lending policies of the World Bank. In February 2003 approximately 100 OWU students travelled to New York City to protest US actions in Iraq, with partial funding from the Wesleyan Chaplain's office.

During Ohio Wesleyan University Against the War on October 5 and November 17, 2004, more than one hundred students held peace rallies in front of Delaware's City Hall.

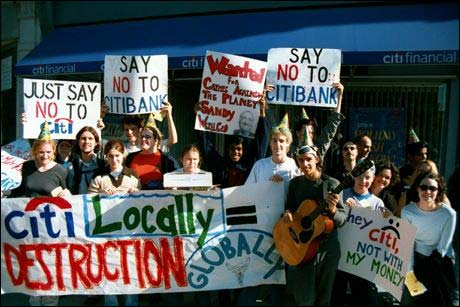
Wesleyan students protesting unfair Citibank employment policies.

On March 17, 2005, the Student Union on Black Awareness (SUBA) and the College Democrats organized a protest on Sandusky Street in Delaware against racial injustice on campus and in the country. University president Mark Huddleston also participated in the protest. During his own college years, President Huddleston had mediated between protesters and administration, favoring classic liberal education over brick-throwers.

Academic pursuit and activism have found an intersection in the form of an annual event called The Sagan National Colloquium. Established in 1984, the SNC annually spotlights an issue of concern in the liberal arts — the impact of science on society, race and reality, censorship and power, and the role of globalization.
