= Karen Lanyon =

Australian diplomat

Karen Lanyon is an Australian senior career officer of the Department of Foreign Affairs and Trade who is the Consul General in Ho Chi Minh City, Vietnam.

Prior to serving in Vietnam, Lanyon was Consul-General in Los Angeles.

Lanyon earned a Bachelor of Arts/Bachelor of Laws from the Australian National University.

She is a breast cancer survivor.
