= Left Alliance (Australia) =

Former Australian political party

- Abbreviation: LA
- Founded: 1983
- Dissolved: c. 1998
- Succeeded by: National Broad Left

The Left Alliance was an Australian organisation of socialist, feminist, and progressive students that flourished in the 1980s and 1990s.

The Left Alliance was formed in 1983 between students aligned with the Communist Party of Australia and the Socialist Caucus in the Australian Union of Students. The Left Alliance was intended to be a pluralistic socialist organisation designed to intervene in the Australian Union of Students and the student movement more broadly. However, the Australian Union of Students collapsed in 1984.

By 1987, the Left Alliance consisted of the Young Socialist League (the youth wing of the CPA), and Resistance, the youth wing of the Democratic Socialist Party, as well as independent activists. Resistance and the DSP opposed participation in the National Union of Students, which had been formed in 1987, on the grounds that it was dominated by the Australian Labor Party, and in December 1988, Resistance left the Left Alliance.

In the 1990s, the Left Alliance became a distinct faction in the student left, rather than the grand alliance envisaged in the 1980s. For much of the 1990s, the Left Alliance dominated the University of Sydney Students' Representative Council; one of its members, Heidi Norman, became the first indigenous SRC President in 1994. In 1995, the Left Alliance at the University of Sydney produced Racism sux: an anti-racist handbook.

By the end of 1997, the Left Alliance was disintegrating. By 1998, it had collapsed in NSW and was nearly gone in Victoria. In Queensland it consisted of a small group. In 1999, the National Broad Left was formed as a new regroupment in the National Union of Students.

Adam Bandt, who was a Left Alliance member at Murdoch University, later became an MP and leader of the Australian Greens.
