= Labor Right =

Political faction within the Australian Labor Party

- Abbreviation: LR
- National Convenors: Matt Thistlethwaite; Don Farrell; Raff Ciccone
- Student wing: Student Unity
- Ideology: Social democracy Third Way
- National affiliation: Australian Labor
- Colours: Red
- Seats in the House of Representatives: 42 / 150
- Seats in the Senate: 11 / 76
- Federal Caucus: 53 / 124

The Labor Right (LR), also known as Labor Forum, Labor Unity or simply Unity, is one of the two major political factions within the Australian Labor Party (ALP). It is characterised by social democratic and Third Way economic policies, in contrast with the Labor Left faction, which leans toward democratic socialism.

Labor Right is composed of autonomous groups in each state and territory of Australia. The groups within the Labor Right come together as a broad alliance at the national level. The faction includes members with a range of political perspectives, including centrism, Third Way, partial privatisation, Keynesianism, social democracy, and labourism.

== State branches ==
Factional power usually finds expression in the percentage vote of aligned delegates at party conferences. The power of the Labor Right varies from state to state, but it usually relies on certain trade unions, such as the Australian Workers' Union (AWU), Transport Workers Union (TWU), the Shop, Distributive and Allied Employees Association (SDA), Plumbing and Pipe Trades Employees Union (PPTEU) and the Health Services Union (HSU). These unions send delegates to the conferences, with delegates usually coming from the membership, the administration of the union or local branches covered by their activists.

State-based factions (national sub-factions) which make up Labor Right include:

=== New South Wales ===
- Centre Unity

=== Queensland ===
- Labor Forum (dominated by the AWU)

=== Australian Capital Territory ===
- Centre Coalition

=== Victoria ===
- Labor Centre Unity (AWU: Consisting of Branch Members and both federal and state members of parliament aligned with the Victorian branch of the Australian Workers' Union, and representatives from the Plumbing and Pipe Trades Employees Union)
- Labor Progressive Unity (The Cons: Consisting largely of Branch Members aligned to and supporters of Labor Deputy Leader Richard Marles and the Transport Workers Union)
- Labor Unity (The Shoppies: Consisting largely of branch members aligned to and supports of the Shop, Distributive and Allied Employees Association)

=== Western Australia ===
- WA Labor Unity (AWU, SDA, TWU).
- Progressive Labor (Consists of AWU, SDA, TWU and CFMEU) An alliance between WA Labor Unity and the 'Industrial left' unions of WA, formed in 2019 for the purpose of binding at State conferences against some subgroups within WA's Broad left; such as the UWU. Historically, the MUA and CFMEU have voted at State conferences in alignment with the Broad left.

=== Northern Territory ===
- Labor Unity

=== South Australia ===
- Labor Unity (dominated by the SDA).

=== Tasmania ===
- Labor Unity

== Political views ==
The faction is most famous for its support of Third Way policies such as the economic rationalist policies of the Bob Hawke and Paul Keating governments, including floating the Australian dollar in December 1983, reductions in trade tariffs, taxation reforms such as the introduction of dividend imputation to eliminate double-taxation of dividends and the lowering of the top marginal income tax rate from 60% in 1983 to 47% in 1996, changing from centralised wage-fixing to enterprise bargaining, the privatisation of Qantas and Commonwealth Bank, making the Reserve Bank of Australia independent, and deregulating the banking system.

Alongside these economic reforms, Labor Right also supported more traditional social democratic policies, such as the introduction of Medicare under Bob Hawke in 1984 and compulsory superannuation under Paul Keating in 1992. The faction also supported significant socially progressive policies, including the blocking of the Franklin River Dam construction and the passage of the Native Title Act in 1993 following the High Court's Mabo decision.

== Federal members ==
Name	Parliamentary seat	Other positions	State/Territory	Sub-faction/union
Richard Marles	Member for Corio	Deputy Prime Minister; Minister for Defence	Victoria	TWU, 'Cons'
Dr Jim Chalmers	Member for Rankin	Treasurer	Queensland	AWU
Don Farrell	Senator for South Australia	Special Minister of State; Minister for Trade and Tourism Deputy Leader of the Government in the Senate	South Australia	SDA
Tony Burke	Member for Watson	Leader of the House Minister for Home Affairs; Minister for Immigration and Multicultural Affairs; Minister for Cyber Security; Minister for the Arts	New South Wales	SDA
Chris Bowen	Member for McMahon	Minister for Climate Change and Energy	New South Wales	
Amanda Rishworth	Member for Kingston	Minister for Employment and Workplace Relations	South Australia	SDA
Jason Clare	Member for Blaxland	Minister for Education	New South Wales	AWU
Michelle Rowland	Member for Greenway	Attorney-General	New South Wales	
Madeleine King	Member for Brand	Minister for Resources; Minister for Northern Australia	Western Australia	SDA
Ed Husic	Member for Chifley		New South Wales	CEPU (CWU)
Clare O'Neil	Member for Hotham	Minister for Housing; Minister for Homelessness	Victoria	AWU
Matt Keogh	Member for Burt	Minister for Veterans' Affairs; Minister for Defence Personnel	Western Australia	AWU
Anika Wells	Member for Lilley	Minister for Communications	Queensland	AWU
Kristy McBain	Member for Eden-Monaro	Minister for Regional Development, Local Government and Territories	New South Wales	
Justine Elliot	Member for Richmond	Assistant Minister for Social Services; Assistant Minister for the Prevention of Family Violence	New South Wales	
Matt Thistlethwaite	Member for Kingsford Smith	Assistant Minister for Immigration	New South Wales	AWU
Emma McBride	Member for Dobell	Assistant Minister for Mental Health and Suicide Prevention; Assistant Minister for Rural and Regional Health	New South Wales	
Anthony Chisholm	Senator for Queensland	Assistant Minister for Education; Assistant Minister for Regional Development	Queensland	AWU
Tim Watts	Member for Gellibrand	Assistant Minister for Foreign Affairs	Victoria	'Cons'
Mark Dreyfus KC	Member for Isaacs		Victoria	AWU
Glenn Sterle^{‡}	Senator for Western Australia	Chair of Rural and Regional Affairs and Transport Legislation Committee; Deputy Chair of Rural and Regional Affairs and Transport References Committee	Western Australia	TWU
Steve Georganas	Member for Adelaide		South Australia	
Shayne Neumann	Member for Blair	Chair of Joint Standing Committee on Foreign Affairs, Defence and Trade; Chair of Standing Committee on Procedure	Queensland	ASU
Alison Byrnes	Member for Cunningham		New South Wales	
Deborah O'Neill	Senator for New South Wales	Chair of Parliamentary Joint Committee on Corporations and Financial Services; Deputy Chair of Select Committee on Work and Care; Deputy Chair of Standing Committee of Privileges	New South Wales	SDA
Helen Polley	Senator for Tasmania	Chair of Parliamentary Joint Committee on Law Enforcement	Tasmania	AWU, SDA
Rob Mitchell	Member for McEwen	Chair of Committee of Privileges and Members' Interests; Chair of House Standing Committee on Industry, Science and Resources	Victoria	'Cons'
Peter Khalil	Member for Wills		Victoria	AWU
Milton Dick	Member for Oxley	Speaker of the House of Representatives; Chair of Joint Committee on the Broadcasting of Parliamentary Proceedings; Chair of Selection Committee; Chair of Standing Committee on Appropriations and Administration	Queensland	AWU
Matt Burnell	Member for Spence		South Australia	TWU
Meryl Swanson	Member for Paterson	Chair of Standing Committee on Primary Industries	New South Wales	
Luke Gosling	Member for Solomon	Chair of Standing Committee on Regional Development, Infrastructure and Transport	Northern Territory	SDA
David Smith	Member for Bean	Government Whip	Australian Capital Territory	Professionals Australia
Raff Ciccone	Senator for Victoria	Deputy Government Whip in the Senate; Chair of Foreign Affairs, Defence and Trade Legislation Committee; Deputy Chair of Foreign Affairs, Defence and Trade References Committee; Deputy Chair of Standing Committee for the Scrutiny of Bills	Victoria	SDA “Shoppies”
Dr Daniel Mulino	Member for Fraser	Chair of Standing Committee on Economics	Victoria	SDA “Shoppies”
Josh Burns	Member for Macnamara	Chair of Parliamentary Joint Committee on Human Rights	Victoria	'Cons'
Marielle Smith	Senator for South Australia	Chair of Community Affairs Legislation Committee; Deputy Chair of Community Affairs References Committee	South Australia	SDA
Tony Sheldon	Senator for New South Wales	Chair of Education and Employment Legislation Committee; Deputy Chair of Education and Employment References Committee	New South Wales	TWU
Dr Mike Freelander	Member for Macarthur	Chair of Standing Committee on Health, Aged Care and Sport	New South Wales	
Cassandra Fernando	Member for Holt		Victoria	SDA
Jana Stewart	Senator for Victoria		Victoria	TWU, 'Cons'
Sam Rae	Member for Hawke		Victoria	TWU, 'Cons'
Varun Ghosh	Senator for West Australia		Western Australia	SDA
Andrew Charlton	Member for Parramatta		New South Wales	
Sally Sitou	Member for Reid		New South Wales	AWU
Dan Repacholi	Member for Hunter		New South Wales	
Joanne Ryan	Member for Lalor	Chief Government Whip	Victoria	'Cons'
Michelle Ananda-Rajah	Senator for Victoria		Victoria	TWU, 'Cons'
Tania Lawrence	Member for Hasluck		Western Australia	SDA
Sam Lim	Member for Tangney		Western Australia	SDA
Gordon Reid	Member for Robertson		New South Wales	AWU
David Moncrieff	Member for Hughes		New South Wales	
Richard Dowling	Senator for Tasmania		Tasmania	AWU
Corinne Mulholland	Senator for Queensland		Queensland	AWU
Emma Comer	Member for Petrie		Queensland	AWU
Claire Clutterham	Member for Sturt		South Australia	
Matt Gregg	Member for Deakin		Victoria	
Alice Jordan-Baird	Member for Gorton		Victoria	

‡ Sterle was formerly a member of the now-defunct Centre Left.

== See also ==
- Labor Left
- Australian Labor Party Caucus
- Moderates – Centrist faction in the Liberal Party of Australia
- New Democrats – centrist faction in the Democratic Party of the United States
- Blue Dog Coalition – centrist faction in the Democratic Party of the United States
- Progress – organisation associated with the Labour Party (UK)
- Seeheimer Kreis – economically liberal faction in the Social Democratic Party of Germany
