= My Story (Gillard book) =

Book by Julia Gillard

- Author: Julia Gillard
- Genre: Autobiography
- Publisher: Random House
- Publication date: 2014
- Publication place: Australia
- Media type: Print
- Pages: 504
- ISBN: 978-0-8579-8390-9

My Story is a political memoir of Julia Gillard, who was the 13th Deputy Prime Minister of Australia from 2007 to 2010, and then the 27th Prime Minister of Australia from 2010 to 2013. She is the first, and to date, only woman to serve in either position. Published in 2014 by Random House Australia, My Story doesn't reflect on various personal aspects of her life and career, including her own analysis of the people and key players of the Rudd-Gillard government.

== Summary and themes ==
My Story covers much of Gillard's political career as the Federal Parliamentary Member for Lalor from 1998 to 2013. The autobiography's focal point is Gillard's rise to power within the Australian Labor Party and the Australian Parliament, as the deputy prime minister of Australia following the 2007 federal election, and her tumultuous tenure as prime minister following the 2010 Australian Labor Party leadership spill against Labor leader and then-Prime Minister Kevin Ruddle. Her memoir analyses her achievements and recognises the failures of the Gillard government.

Gillard is critical of Rudd and his supporters for what she believed was their constant undermining of her prime ministership which led to two unsuccessful leadership challenges throughout her tenure, followed by a successful leadership spill in June 2013, which saw her ousted as prime minister and replaced by Rudd. The Liberal–National Coalition, led by then-Opposition Leader Tony Abbott also received criticism for their "hostile" and "negative" approach to opposition; Gillard detailed her motivations and reactions towards to the 2012 Misogyny Speech she delivered, in which she accused Abbott of sexism and misogyny.

The memoir is split into two sections. The first section, entitled "How I Did It", comprises the circumstances in how she challenged Rudd for the leadership of the Labor Party, as well the issues she faced during her governance. The second and longer section of the autobiography, "Why I Did It", details her life and the policy achievements of her government.

Since its release in 2014, Gillard has released new editions of My Story, as to encapsulate related events which had since occurred post her prime-ministership, such as the leadership spills within the Liberal Party of Australia, which saw the demise of Prime Minister Tony Abbott and the election of Malcolm Turnbull as leader of the Liberal Party, and Prime Minister of Australia in September 2015.

== Release ==
The 504-page political memoir was released in September 2014 by Random House, almost a year and a half after Gillard's departure from Australian politics. The former Governor-General of Australia, Dame Quentin Bryce (2008–2014), launched the book at an event that was attended by various Labor party figures, including Gillard's former Treasurer and Deputy Prime Minister Wayne Swan, Greg Combet, Craig Emerson, Tanya Plibersek, Kate Ellis, Tony Burke; in addition to former prime minister Bob Hawke and former state premiers, Anna Bligh (Queensland), John Brumby (Victoria) and Kristina Keneally (New South Wales).

== Reception ==
Gillard's memoirs sold 5,000 copies during its first week, according to Random House.

In response to Gillard's criticism of his leadership and his conduct following the 2010 leadership challenge, Rudd released a statement. In it, his media spokeswoman said, "Consistent with the past, Mr Rudd has no substantive comment to make on Ms Gillard's latest contribution to Australian fiction ... The Australian people have long reached their own conclusions about Ms Gillard's relationship with the truth – from the coup to the carbon tax. They have also reached their own conclusions on Ms Gillard's continuing efforts to reconstruct a justification after the event for her actions in June 2010, by trying to dress up personal political ambition as some higher purpose for the party and the government."

The book received generally favourable reviews, with The Conversation noting "For those looking for a tell-all confession of the life and loves of Julia Gillard, My Story will disappoint. For readers seeking Gillard's views of the first Rudd government and the rise and fall of her own government, there is plenty of meat here." Feminist and writer Anne Summers praised the autobiography for its knowledge on the mechanisms of government in a review with The Australian, "As a primer on how government works, My Story is on a par with the cabinet diaries of Clyde Cameron, Peter Howson, Neal Blewett and Gareth Evans. It's as comprehensive, but more personal, than [Prime Minister John Howard's] Lazarus Rising." In 2015, Gillard's memoir was shortlisted for the category of 2015 Biography of the Year by the Australian Book Industry Awards.

My Story was the highest selling politics-related book in 2014, selling 62,000 copies.

=== Settlement with Xenophon ===
In the book, Senator Nick Xenophon was said to have been '"infamously excluded from university for a period as punishment for stuffing a ballot box full of voting papers he had somehow procured", which was denied by Xenophon. In February 2015, Random House issued a public apology to Xenophon and paid a confidential cash settlement. Xenophon continued to request a personal apology from Gillard. On 6 August 2015, Gillard published a personal apology to Xenophon in a number of Australian newspapers.
