= Bill Kibby =

Recipient of the Victoria Cross

Bill Kibby VC
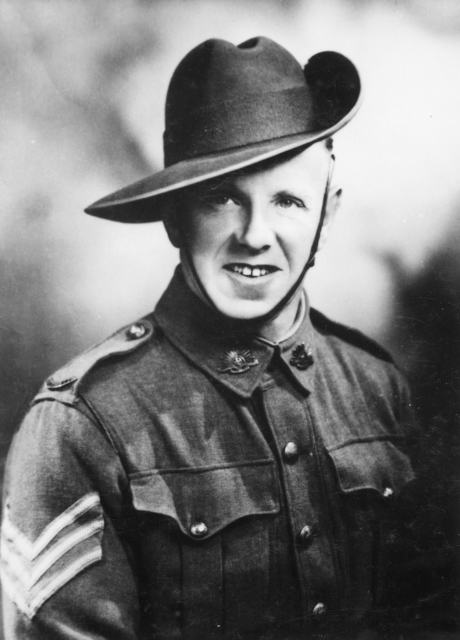
- Kibby c. 1941
- Born: 15 April 1903; Winlaton, County Durham, England
- Died: 31 October 1942 (aged 39); El Alamein, Egypt
- Burial place: El Alamein War Cemetery
- Military career
- Allegiance: Australia
- Branch: Australian Army
- Service years: 1936–1942
- Rank: Sergeant
- Units: 2/48th Infantry Battalion
- Conflicts: World War II; Western Desert campaign; First Battle of El Alamein; Second Battle of El Alamein †
- Awards: Victoria Cross

William Henry Kibby, VC (15 April 1903 – 31 October 1942) was a British-born Australian recipient of the Victoria Cross, the highest award for gallantry in the face of the enemy that could be awarded to a member of the Australian armed forces at the time. Kibby emigrated to South Australia with his parents in early 1914 and worked as an interior decorator and served in the part-time Militia prior to World War II. In 1940, he enlisted in the all-volunteer Second Australian Imperial Force and joined the 2/48th Infantry Battalion. His unit was sent to the Middle East, but soon after arriving, Kibby broke his leg and spent the next year recovering and undergoing further training while his battalion took part in the North African campaign. He rejoined his unit when it was serving on garrison duties in northern Syria after its involvement in the siege of Tobruk, but in June 1942 it was sent to Egypt and recommitted to the North Africa campaign. Kibby was with the battalion during the First Battle of El Alamein in July.

In October, the 2/48th Battalion was committed to the Second Battle of El Alamein, during which Kibby undertook a series of courageous actions across the period from 23 to 31 October. In the first episode, he went forward alone and silenced an enemy machine-gun post. In the second, he provided inspirational leadership to his platoon and mended its telephone line under heavy fire. On the final occasion, he pressed forward under withering fire and helped his company capture its objective. This final action ultimately cost him his life. He was then posthumously awarded the Victoria Cross. A memorial trust used donated money to purchase a house for his widow and two daughters. His medal set is displayed at the Australian War Memorial in the Hall of Valour.

== Early life ==
William Henry Kibby was born at Winlaton, County Durham, United Kingdom, on 15 April 1903. The second of three children, Kibby was born to John Robert Kibby, a draper's assistant, and Mary Isabella Kibby née Birnie. He had two sisters. In early 1914, the Kibby family emigrated to Adelaide, South Australia. Bill attended Mitcham Public School and then held various jobs before securing a position at the Perfection Fibrous Plaster Works in Edwardstown. There, he worked as an interior decorator, designing and fixing plaster decorations. He married Mabel Sarah Bidmead Morgan in 1926; they lived at Helmsdale (now Glenelg East) and had two daughters, Clariss and Jacqueline.

Kibby stood only 5 feet 6 inches (168 cm) tall, but was a strong man and enjoyed outdoor activities. He joined the scouting movement, as an assistant scoutmaster of the 2nd Glenelg Sea Scouts where he crewed their lifeboat. He enjoyed family walks and picnics and was a keen golfer, playing on various public courses. He was also a talented artist, painting and drawing in addition to his plaster design work, and even briefly attended art classes at the School of Mines and Industries. He was described as a quiet and sincere man who loved gardening. In 1936, he joined the part-time Militia and was posted to the 48th Field Battery, Royal Australian Artillery. Along with his Militia service, he enjoyed participating in military tattoos.

== World War II ==
On 29 June 1940, Kibby enlisted in the all-volunteer Second Australian Imperial Force, which had been raised for overseas service in World War II. He was posted to the 2/48th Infantry Battalion, part of the 26th Brigade. This brigade was initially assigned to the 7th Division. On 14 September, when the battalion was training in South Australia, Kibby was promoted to acting corporal, and this was followed by promotion to acting sergeant a month later. The 2/48th embarked on the troopship HMT Stratheden on 17 November and sailed for the Middle East, where it disembarked in Palestine on 17 December. On New Year's Eve, Kibby fell into a slit trench and broke his leg. He then spent months convalescing. During his recovery, he produced at least forty watercolours and pencil drawings, which, according to his biographer, Bill Gammage, displayed "a fondness for Palestine's countryside and a feeling for its people". While in Palestine, Kibby struck up a friendship with the painter Esmond George, and occasionally accompanied him on sketching trips. After recovering, Kibby joined the brigade training battalion in August 1941 and also attended the infantry school to complete a weapons course. He rejoined the 2/48th in February 1942, the 26th Brigade having been transferred to the 9th Division a year earlier. At the time, the battalion was undertaking garrison duties in northern Syria, after participating in the siege of Tobruk.

During early 1942, the Axis forces had advanced steadily through northwest Egypt. It was decided that the British Eighth Army should make a stand just over 100 kilometres (62 mi) west of Alexandria, at the railway siding of El Alamein, where the coastal plain narrowed between the Mediterranean Sea and the inhospitable Qattara Depression. On 26 June 1942, the 9th Division was ordered to begin moving from northern Syria to El Alamein. On 1 July, Generalfeldmarschall Erwin Rommel's forces made a major attack, hoping to dislodge the Allies from the area, take Alexandria, and open the way to Cairo and the Suez Canal. This attack resulted in the First Battle of El Alamein. The Eighth Army had regrouped sufficiently to repel the Axis forces and launch counter-attacks. On 6 July, the lead elements of the 9th Division arrived at Tel el Shammama 22 miles (35 km) from the front, from where they would be committed to the fighting in the northern sector.

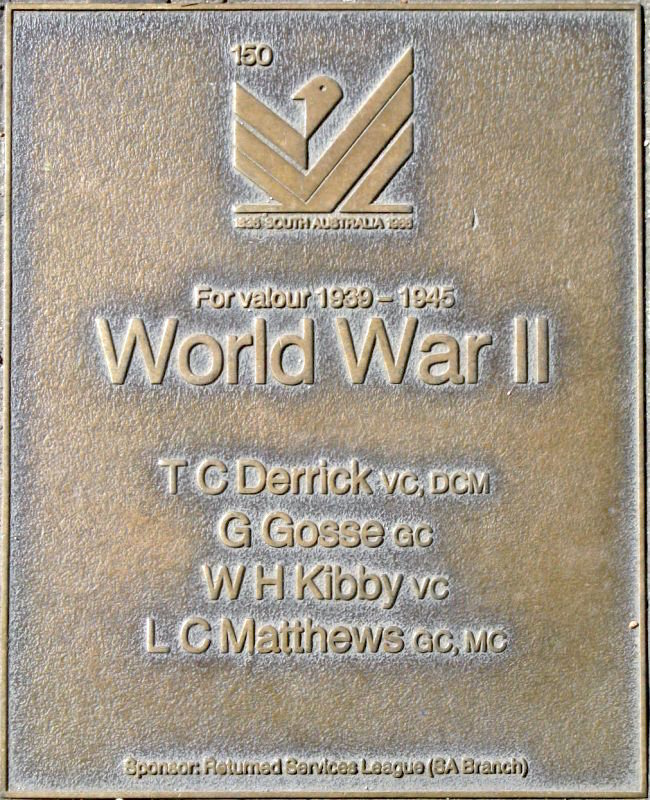
Jubilee 150 Walkway plaque commemorating highly decorated World War II soldiers from South Australia

Before dawn on 10 July, as Rommel focused his efforts on the southern flank of the battlefield, the 9th Division attacked the north flank of the enemy positions and captured the strategic high ground around Tel el Eisa. In the days following, Rommel redirected his forces against them, in a series of intense counter-attacks, but was unable to dislodge the Australians. On 22 July, the 24th and 26th Brigades attacked German positions on the ridges south of Tel el Eisa, suffering heavy casualties but taking positions on Makh Khad Ridge and Tel el Eisa itself.

At the Second Battle of El Alamein, from 23 to 31 October 1942, Kibby distinguished himself through his skill in leading his platoon, after its commander had been killed, during the first attack at Miteiriya Ridge. On 23 October, he charged a machine‑gun position, firing at it with his Thompson submachine gun; Kibby killed three enemy soldiers, captured twelve others and took the position. His company commander intended to recommend him for the Distinguished Conduct Medal after this action, but was killed. During the following days, Kibby moved among his men directing fire and cheering them on. He mended his platoon's telephone line several times under intense fire, restoring communications with the battalion mortars and enabling them to bring down fire on the attacking enemy. During 30–31 October, the platoon came under heavy machine‑gun and mortar fire. Most of the members of the platoon were killed or wounded, and by the time the battle was over the total fighting strength of the battalion was down to 213 men from an establishment strength of 910. At one point before midnight on 31 October, in order to achieve his company's objective, Kibby moved forward alone, to within a few metres of the enemy, throwing grenades. Just as his success in this endeavour appeared decisive, he was killed. By the morning, the 2/48th consisted of fewer than 50 unwounded men. The posts captured by the 2/48th that night were lost to the enemy, who buried Kibby with other dead in a common grave. Later, when the area was retaken by Australian troops, the men of his unit searched for ten days, found the grave and reburied the men individually.

Kibby was subsequently recommended for the posthumous award of the Victoria Cross, the highest award for gallantry in the face of the enemy that could be awarded to an Australian armed forces member at the time. The citation was partly based on a note found in the pocket of his dead company commander. The award was listed in the London Gazette on 28 January 1943, and the citation read:

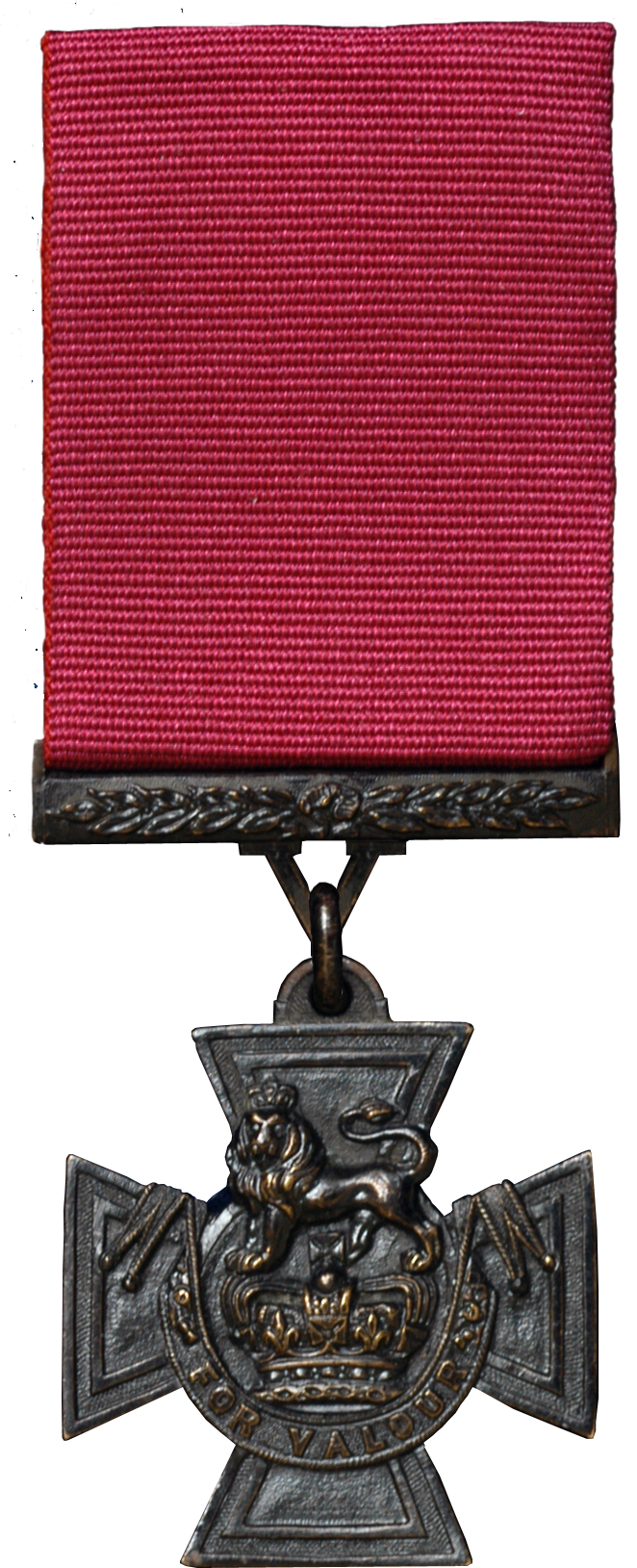
The Victoria Cross

During the initial attack at Miteiriya Ridge on the 23rd October, 1942, the Commander of No. 17 Platoon, to which Sergeant Kibby belonged, was killed. No sooner had Sergeant Kibby assumed command, than his Platoon was ordered to attack strong enemy positions holding up the advance of his Company. Sergeant Kibby immediately realised the necessity for quick decisive action, and without thought for his personal safety he dashed forward towards the enemy posts firing his Tommy-gun. This rapid and courageous individual action resulted in the complete silencing of the enemy fire, by the killing of three of the enemy and the capture of twelve others. With these posts silenced, his Company was then able to continue the advance.

After the capture of TRIG 29 on 26 October, intense enemy artillery concentrations were directed on the battalion area, which were invariably followed with counter-attacks by tanks and infantry. Throughout the attack that culminated in the capture of TRIG 29 and the re-organisation period which followed, Sergeant Kibby moved from section to section personally directing their fire and cheering the men, despite the fact that the Platoon throughout was suffering heavy casualties. Several times, while under intense machine‑gun fire, he went out and mended the platoon line communications, thus allowing mortar concentrations to be directed effectively against the attacks on his Company's front. His whole demeanour during this difficult phase in the operations was an inspiration to his Platoon.

On the night of 30–31 October when the Battalion attacked "ring contour" 25 behind the enemy lines, it was necessary for No. 17 Platoon to move through withering fire in order to reach its objective. These conditions did not deter Sergeant Kibby from pressing forward right to the objective, despite his platoon's being mown down by machine-gun fire from point-blank range. One pocket of resistance still remained and Sergeant Kibby went forward alone throwing grenades to destroy the enemy now only a few yards distant. Just as success appeared certain, he was killed by a burst of machine gunfire. Such outstanding courage, tenacity of purpose and devotion to duty was entirely responsible for the successful capture of the Company's objective. His work was an inspiration to all and he left behind an example and the memory of a soldier who fearlessly and unselfishly fought to the end to carry out his duty.

— The London Gazette 26 January 1943

George was invalided back to Adelaide early in 1943 and was able to pass on to Mabel Kibby some of her husband's works. The Governor-General of Australia, Baron Gowrie, himself a recipient of the VC, presented Kibby's award to Mabel Kibby on 27 November 1943.

== Postscript ==
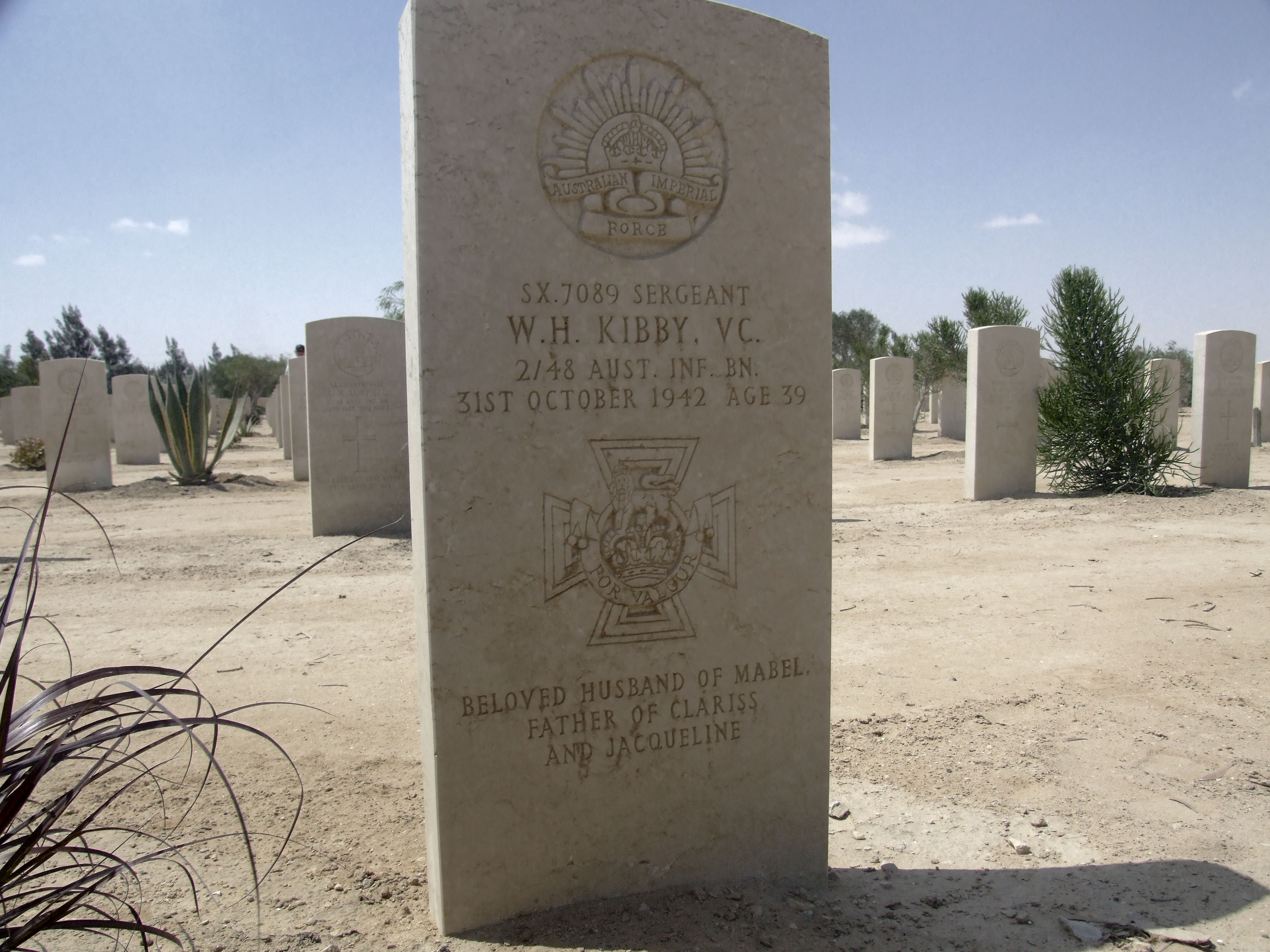
Grave of Bill Kibby at the Commonwealth War Graves cemetery, El Alamein, Egypt

In January 1944, Kibby's remains were re-interred in the El Alamein War Cemetery maintained by the Commonwealth War Graves Commission. In the same year, a memorial trust was established and raised A£1,001, which was used to purchase a house on Third Avenue, Helmsdale, for Mabel and their daughters. Along with the Victoria Cross, Kibby was also entitled to the 1939–1945 Star, Africa Star with 8th Army clasp, Defence Medal, War Medal 1939–1945 and Australia Service Medal 1939–1945. Later, Mabel donated his medal set to the Australian War Memorial; it is on display in the Hall of Valour.

In 1947, Kibby's father John met Field Marshal Bernard Montgomery, who had commanded the Allied forces during the Second Battle of El Alamein, when he visited Adelaide. In 1956, the soldiers' mess at Woodside Barracks in the Adelaide Hills was named for Kibby. In 1996, a rest area on the Federal Highway near Yarra, New South Wales was named after him. There are a Kibby Avenue and Kibby Reserve in an area of Glenelg North devoted to South Australian Victoria Cross and George Cross recipients. A veteran's shed and a street in Loxton are also named after Kibby.
