= Mitcham Primary School =

Primary school in Kingswood, South Australia

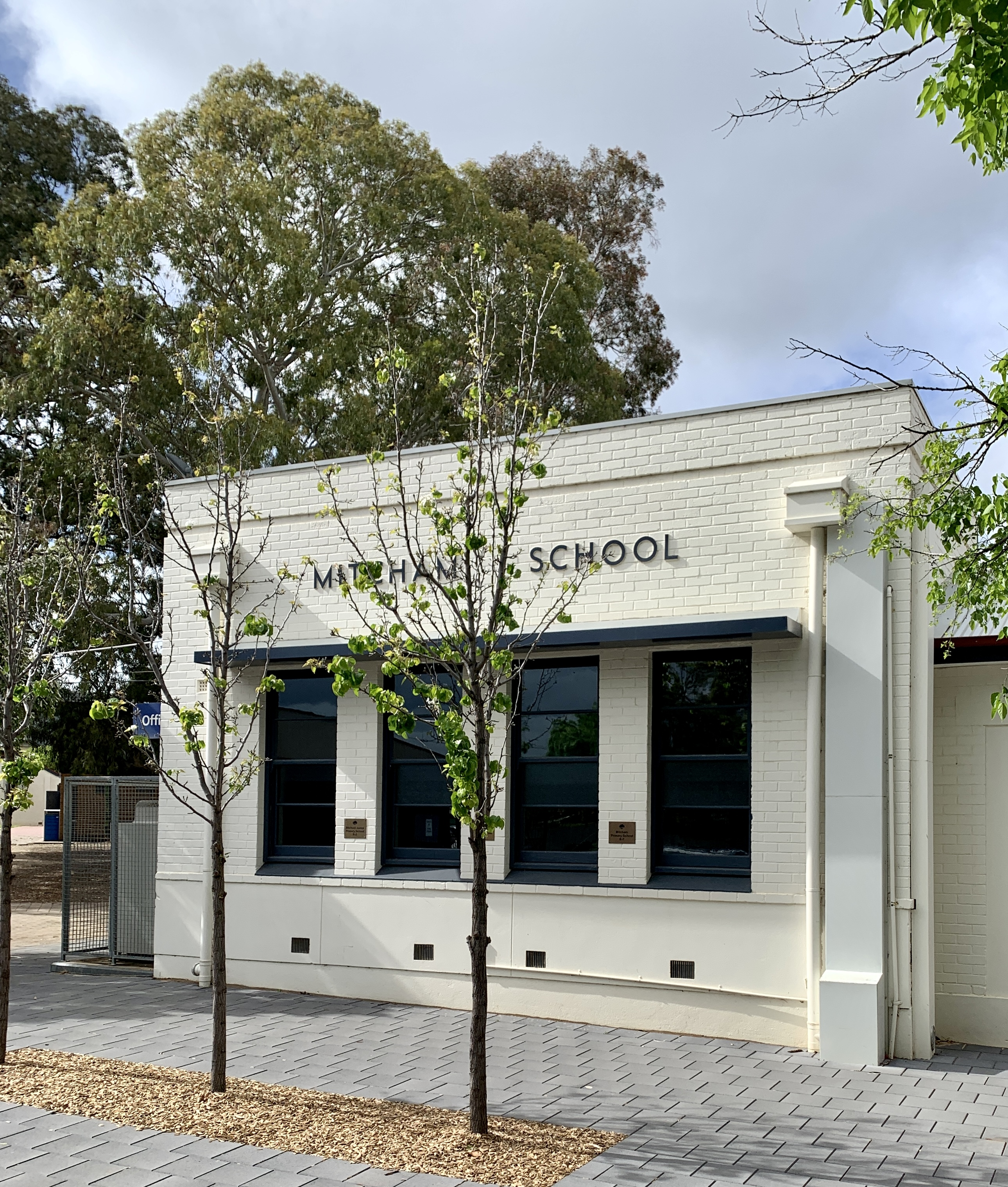
- Mitcham, South Australia; South Australia

Information
- Type: State school

Mitcham Primary School is a South Australian State school serving the Mitcham area and situated on Hillview Road, Kingswood. It is the oldest continuously operating government school in South Australia. It has an enrolment of approximately 766 students from Reception to Year 7 and an Out of School Hours Care Program. The school predominantly serves the suburbs of Kingswood, Mitcham, Hawthorn, Netherby and Torrens Park. The school opened in 1847 with Thomas Mugg as the teacher in a hut on Mitcham Reserve. The school moved to the Mitcham Institute in 1870 and then to a purpose built school on Bulls Creek Road (Belair Road) in 1880. A new Primary school opened on the current site in Kingswood in 1953 and the Infant school and Primary came together on this site in 1981.

== History ==
South Australia was first settled by colonists from Britain in 1836 and by the late 1840s Adelaide was a thriving community, with Mitcham being a significant village a few miles to the south. A combined chapel/school building was erected, paid for by subscription of local families, and opened as a school in 1847 with the teacher Thomas Mugg who had been a cabinet maker in London. As attendance steadily increased the classroom became very crowded. Mugg continued as the teacher to 1868 teaching a very basic curriculum and enforcing strict discipline with regular use of a cane.

=== Growth ===
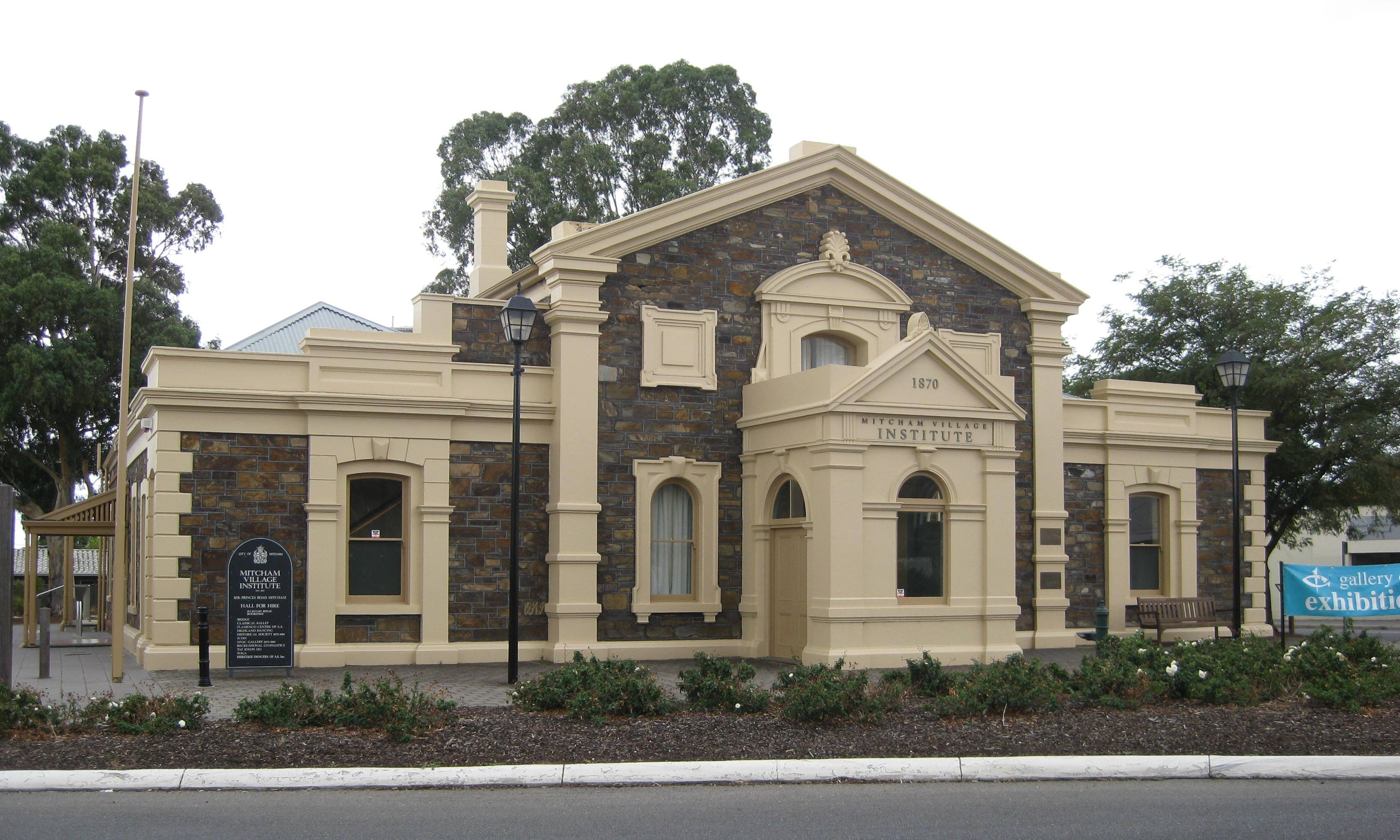
Mitcham Institute,

At this time the community of South Australia was struggling with the problem of how to manage and extend public education in the colony. The Central Board of Education heard complaints about the quality of teachers in community run schools. Of 290 teachers supervised by the Board in 1875 only 135 were certificated as teachers. In 1875, the South Australian parliament passed the Education Act, establishing a public school system. All licensed schools such as Mitcham became Public Schools. The Act made schooling compulsory for children from 7 to 13 years (but not full-time).

The crowded conditions continued to 1880 when a new purpose built school was opened on Bulls Creek Road (now Belair Road). Three years later the Mitcham Railway Station was opened next to the school on the new Adelaide-Aldgate line, creating with the school, a new centre of the Mitcham community. The close proximity of the school to the main Adelaide-Melbourne railway line entertained generations of children but severely restricted the expansion of the school grounds. The school continued to grow and enrolment was approximately 200 in 1900 and 200 by 1930.

In 2013 the Junior Primary and Primary schools were consolidated under one principal.

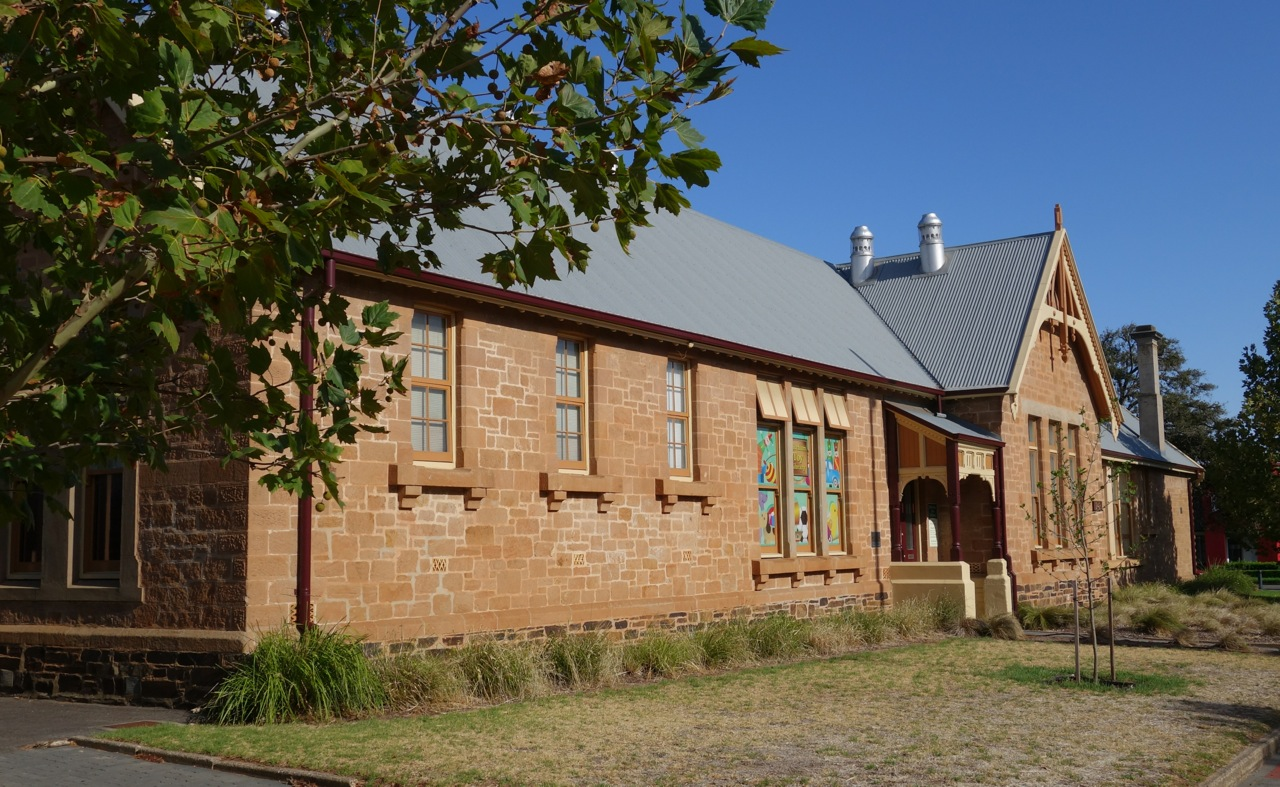
Old Mitcham Primary School

== Headmasters/Principals ==
Principals	Years	Title
Thomas Mugg	1847–1867	Teacher
William Anderson	1867–1868	"
Charles Webb	1868–1878	"
Paul Mueller	1878–1891	Head Teacher
Fred Kruger	1892–1899	"
James Fowler	1900–1905	"
Josiah Willmott	1905–1918	"
Isaac Jacobs	1918–1927	"
Robert Alexander	1927–1828	"
Walter Huntley	1928–1930	
Dennis Murphy	1931	"
Henry Hudson	1932	"
Charles Pearson	1932–1936	"

Primary School	Years	Title	Infant/Junior Primary	Years	Title
Don Charmichael	1945–1950	Head Master	Rosina Naughton	1948–1950	Infant Mistress
Edgar Sexton	1950–1951	Head Master			
John Blizard	1951–1952	"	Irene Harmer	1950–1955	"
Herbert Townsend	1952–1955	"	Elizabeth Eardley	1956–1957	"
Francis Hussey	1956–1957	"	Una Macdonald	1957–1958	"
Raymond Koehne	1958	"			"
Garry Habich	1959–1966	Master of Method	Monica Naylor	1958–1966	"
Alick Smith	1966–1974	"	Rita Atkinson	1966–1970	"
Rex Hosking	1975	"	Margaret Tscharke	1972	"
Ross Carthew	1976–1980	Principal	Judith Smith	1972–1976	Principal
Anthony Earle	1981	Acting Principal	Polly Graetz	1976	"
Denis Vance	1982–1985	Principal	Virginia Watts	1977–1985	"
Gerald White	1986–1990	"	Daphne Liebelt	1986–1987	"
John Travers	1991–1998	"	Patricia Cosh	1988–2003	"
Rod Tyney	1998–1999	Acting Principal	Gaye Glade-Wright	2004–2008	"
Steve Adams	1999–2010	Principal	Suzie Sangster	2009–2012	"
Maryanne Tiller	2011–2012	"	Jodie Kingham	2012–2012	"

Primary School	Years	Title
Maryanne Tiller	2013–2018	Principal
Scott Greenshields	2019–	Principal

== Notable students ==
Name	Years attended	Notes
Thomas Playford II	1847...	One of the first students at the school, later became a farmer, member of parliament and Premier of South Australia, whose father, Thomas Playford I, was one of the founders of the school. His grandson Thomas Thomas Playford IV was also Premier of South Australia from 1938 to 1965 – the longest serving Premier.
Bill Kibby, VC	1914–...	William Henry Kibby was a volunteer in the Second Australian Imperial Force who served in World War II and was posthumously awarded the Victoria Cross for gallantry in the face of the enemy.
Julia Gillard	1967–1973	Prime Minister of Australia from 2010–2013, and Australia's first woman Prime Minister. Gillard continued her education at Unley High School.
