= Julia Gillard =

Prime Minister of Australia from 2010 to 2013

The Honourable Julia Gillard AC
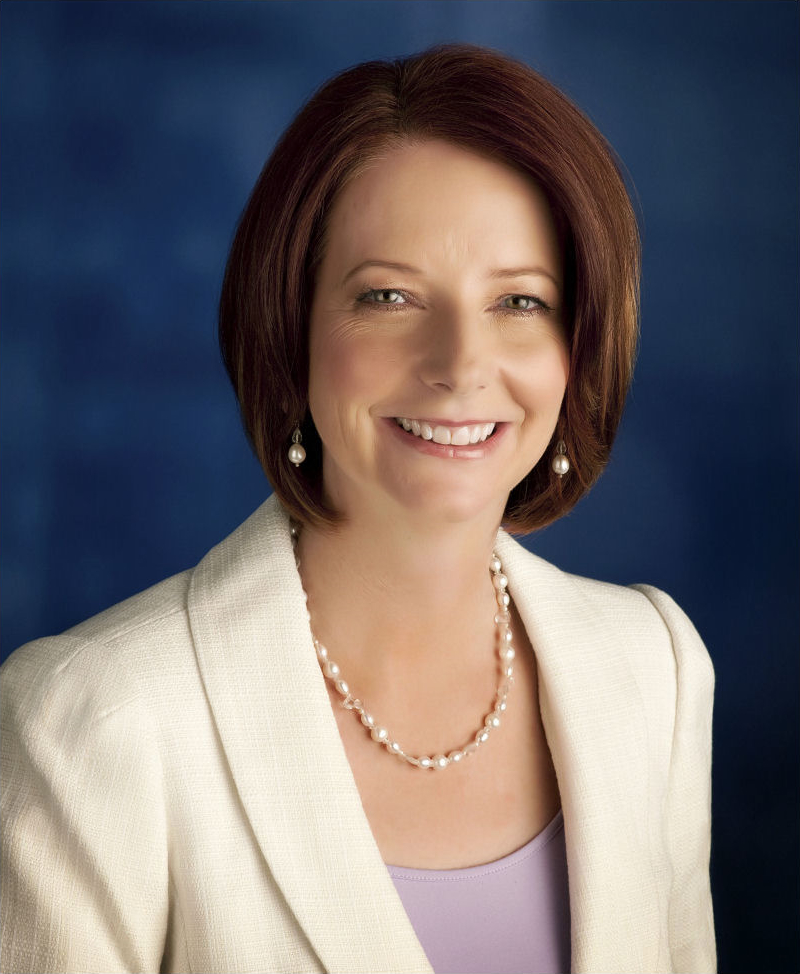
- Official portrait, 2010

27th Prime Minister of Australia
- In office 24 June 2010 – 27 June 2013
- Monarch: Elizabeth II
- Governor General: Quentin Bryce
- Deputy: Wayne Swan
- Preceded by: Kevin Rudd
- Succeeded by: Kevin Rudd

19th Leader of the Labor Party
- In office 24 June 2010 – 26 June 2013
- Deputy: Wayne Swan
- Preceded by: Kevin Rudd
- Succeeded by: Kevin Rudd

Deputy Prime Minister of Australia
- In office 3 December 2007 – 24 June 2010
- Prime Minister: Kevin Rudd
- Preceded by: Mark Vaile
- Succeeded by: Wayne Swan

Deputy Leader of the Labor Party
- In office 4 December 2006 – 24 June 2010
- Leader: Kevin Rudd
- Preceded by: Jenny Macklin
- Succeeded by: Wayne Swan

Deputy Leader of the Opposition
- In office 4 December 2006 – 3 December 2007
- Leader: Kevin Rudd
- Preceded by: Jenny Macklin
- Succeeded by: Julie Bishop
Cabinet Positions
Minister for Education
In office 3 December 2007 – 28 June 2010
| Prime Minister | Kevin Rudd; Herself |
| Preceded by | Julie Bishop |
| Succeeded by | Simon Crean |
Minister for Employment and Workplace Relations
In office 3 December 2007 – 28 June 2010
| Prime Minister | Kevin Rudd; Herself |
| Preceded by | Joe Hockey |
| Succeeded by | Simon Crean |
Minister for Social Inclusion
In office 3 December 2007 – 28 June 2010
| Prime Minister | Kevin Rudd; Herself |
| Preceded by | Mike Rann |
| Succeeded by | Simon Crean |

Manager of Opposition Business
- In office 8 December 2003 – 10 December 2006
- Leader: Mark Latham; Kim Beazley
- Preceded by: Mark Latham
- Succeeded by: Anthony Albanese

Member of the Australian Parliament for Lalor
- In office 3 October 1998 – 5 August 2013
- Preceded by: Barry Jones
- Succeeded by: Joanne Ryan

Personal details
- Born: Julia Eileen Gillard; 29 September 1961 (age 65) Barry, Wales
- Citizenship: Australia; United Kingdom (until 1998)
- Party: Labor
- Domestic partner: Tim Mathieson (2006–2021)
- Education: University of Melbourne (BA, LLB)
- Occupation: Lawyer; politician
- Website: Personal website
- Gillard's voice At a press conference with former US president Barack Obama; Recorded 16 November 2011

Julia Eileen Gillard (born 29 September 1961) is an Australian former politician who served as the 27th prime minister of Australia from 2010 to 2013. She held office as the leader of the Labor Party (ALP), having previously served as the 13th deputy prime minister from 2007 to 2010. She is the first and only woman to hold either office.

Born in Barry, Wales, Gillard migrated with her family to Adelaide in South Australia in 1966. She attended Mitcham Demonstration School and Unley High School. Gillard went on to study at the University of Adelaide, but switched to the University of Melbourne in 1982, where she graduated with a Bachelor of Laws in 1986 and a Bachelor of Arts in 1989. During this time, she was president of the Australian Union of Students from 1983 to 1984. In 1987, Gillard joined the law firm Slater & Gordon, eventually becoming a partner in 1990, specialising in industrial law. In 1996, she became chief of staff to John Brumby, the Leader of the Opposition in Victoria. Gillard was first elected to the House of Representatives at the 1998 election for the Victorian division of Lalor. Following the 2001 election, she was appointed to the shadow cabinet. In December 2006, Gillard became the running mate of Kevin Rudd in a successful leadership challenge to Kim Beazley, becoming deputy leader of the opposition. After Labor's victory at the 2007 election, she was appointed as deputy prime minister, and was also given the roles of Minister for Education, Minister for Employment and Workplace Relations, and Minister for Social Inclusion.

On 24 June 2010, after Rudd lost internal support within the Labor Party and resigned as leader, Gillard was elected unopposed as his replacement in a leadership spill, and was sworn in as prime minister. She led Labor through the 2010 election weeks later, which saw the first hung parliament since 1940. Gillard was able to form a minority government with the support of the Greens and three independents. During its term of office, the Gillard government introduced the National Disability Insurance Scheme (NDIS), the Gonski funding, oversaw the early rollout of the National Broadband Network (NBN), and controversially implemented a carbon pricing scheme. Her premiership was often undermined by party instability and numerous scandals, including the AWU affair and the Health Services Union expenses affair. Gillard and Rudd became embroiled in a lengthy political rivalry, resulting in Gillard losing the leadership of the party back to him in a June 2013 leadership spill. Her resignation as prime minister took effect the next day, and she announced her retirement from politics.

In the years following her retirement, Gillard has been a visiting professor at the University of Adelaide, the Senior Fellow at the Brookings Institution's Center for Universal Education, the chair of the Global Partnership for Education since 2014 and the chair of Beyond Blue from 2017 to 2023. She released her memoir, My Story, in 2014. In 2021, she became chair of the Wellcome Trust, succeeding Eliza Manningham-Buller. Although Gillard often ranked poorly in opinion polls as prime minister, her premiership has been more favourably received in retrospect. Political experts often place her in the middle-to-upper tier of Australian prime ministers.

== Early life ==
=== Birth and family background ===
Gillard was born on 29 September 1961 in Barry, Vale of Glamorgan, Wales. She is the second of two daughters born to John Oliver Gillard (1929–2012) and the former Moira Mackenzie (1928–2017); her older sister Alison was born in 1958. Gillard's father was born in Cwmgwrach, but was of predominantly English descent; he worked as a psychiatric nurse. Her mother was born in Barry, and is of distant Scottish and Irish descent; she worked in a Salvation Army nursing home.

After Gillard suffered from bronchopneumonia as a child, her parents were advised it would aid her recovery if they were to live in a warmer climate. This led the family to migrate to Australia in 1966, settling in Adelaide, South Australia. The Gillard family's first month in Australia was spent in the Pennington Hostel, a now-closed migrant facility located in Pennington, South Australia. In 1974, eight years after they arrived, Gillard and her family became Australian citizens. As a result, Gillard held dual citizenship until she renounced her British citizenship prior to entering the Australian parliament in 1998.

=== Education and legal career ===
Gillard attended Mitcham Demonstration School before going on to Unley High School. She began an arts degree at the University of Adelaide, during which she was president of the Adelaide University Union from 1981 to 1982. In her second year at the university, Gillard was introduced to politics by the daughter of a state Labor minister. Accordingly, she joined the Labor Club and became involved in a campaign to fight federal education budget cuts. Gillard cut short her courses in Adelaide in 1982, and moved to Melbourne to work with the Australian Union of Students. In 1983, she became the second woman to lead the Australian Union of Students, serving until the organisation's discontinuation in 1984. She was also the secretary of the left-wing organisation Socialist Forum. Having transferred her studies to the University of Melbourne, Gillard graduated with a Bachelor of Laws degree in 1986 and a Bachelor of Arts degree in 1989. In 1987, she joined the law firm Slater & Gordon in Werribee, Victoria, working in industrial law. In 1990, she was admitted as a partner; at the age of 29, she was the youngest partner within the firm, and one of the first women to hold the position.

=== Early political involvement ===
From 1985 to 1989, Gillard was president of the Carlton branch of the Labor Party. She stood for Labor preselection in the Division of Melbourne prior to the 1993 federal election, but was defeated by Lindsay Tanner. At the 1996 federal election, Gillard won the third position on Labor's Senate ticket in Victoria, behind Robert Ray and Barney Cooney. However, on the final distribution of preferences she was defeated by Lyn Allison of the Australian Democrats.

In 1996, Gillard resigned from her position with Slater & Gordon to serve as chief of staff to John Brumby, at that time the Leader of the Opposition in Victoria. She was responsible for drafting the affirmative-action rules within the Labor Party in Victoria that set the target of pre-selecting women for 35 per cent of "winnable seats". She also played a role in the foundation of EMILY's List, the pro-choice fund-raising and support network for Labor women.

Gillard has cited Welsh Labour politician Aneurin Bevan as one of her political heroes.

== Member of Parliament (1998–2007) ==
Gillard was first elected to the House of Representatives at the 1998 federal election representing Lalor, a safe Labor seat near Melbourne, replacing Barry Jones who retired. She made her maiden speech to the House on 11 November 1998. Gillard was a member of the standing committee for Employment, Education and Workplace Relations from 8 December 1998 to 8 December 2001, in addition to Aboriginal and Torres Strait Islander Affairs from 20 March 2003 to 18 August 2003. Within the joint committees, she was a member of the Public Accounts and Audit from 8 December 1998 to 11 February 2002, in addition to the Native Title and the Aboriginal and Torres Strait Islander Land Fund from 20 March 2003 to 11 August 2003.

=== Shadow Minister (2001–2007) ===
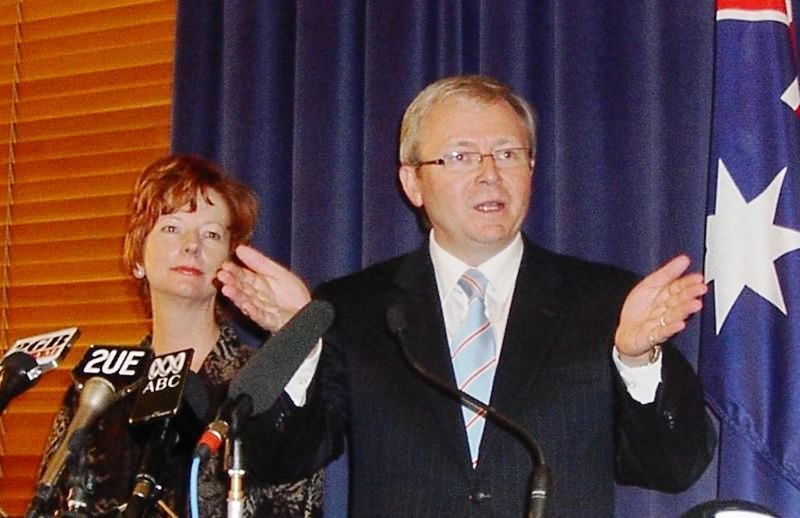
Gillard at her first press conference as Deputy Leader in 2006, alongside new Leader Kevin Rudd

After Labor's defeat at the 2001 federal election, Gillard was elected to the Shadow Cabinet under then-Labor Leader Simon Crean, where she was given responsibility for Population and Immigration. In February 2003, she was given additional responsibilities for Reconciliation and Indigenous Affairs. In these roles, in the wake of the Tampa and Children Overboard affairs, which were partly credited with Labor's 2001 election loss, Gillard developed a new immigration policy for the Labor Party.

Gillard was later promoted to the position of Shadow Minister for Health and Deputy Manager of Opposition Business in the House (to Mark Latham) on 2 July 2003. During this time, she shadowed Tony Abbott, with the rivalry between the two often attracting attention from the media. She was later given additional responsibility for managing opposition business in the House of Representatives by Latham, who had succeeded Beazley as Labor Party leader.

In the aftermath of Labor's fourth consecutive defeat in the 2004 federal election it was widely speculated that Gillard might challenge Jenny Macklin for the deputy leadership, but she did not do so. Gillard had been spoken of as a potential future leader of the party for some years, but never stood in a leadership contest. After Mark Latham resigned as Labor Leader in January 2005, Gillard appeared on ABC's Australian Story in March 2006, after which an Ipsos Mackay poll conducted for Network Ten's Meet the Press found that more respondents would prefer Gillard to be Labor Leader; she polled 32% compared with Beazley's 25% and Kevin Rudd's 18%. Although she had significant cross-factional support, she announced on 25 January 2005 that she would not contest the leadership, allowing Beazley to be elected unopposed.

=== Deputy Opposition Leader (2006–2007) ===
On 1 December 2006, as part of a cross-factional political partnership with Kevin Rudd, Gillard challenged Jenny Macklin for the deputy leadership. After Rudd successfully replaced Beazley as Labor Leader on 4 December 2006, Macklin chose to resign, allowing Gillard to become Deputy Leader unopposed. In the subsequent reshuffle, Gillard was allocated responsibility for Employment, Workplace Relations and Social Inclusion, as well as being made Deputy Leader of the Opposition.

== Deputy Prime Minister (2007–2010) ==
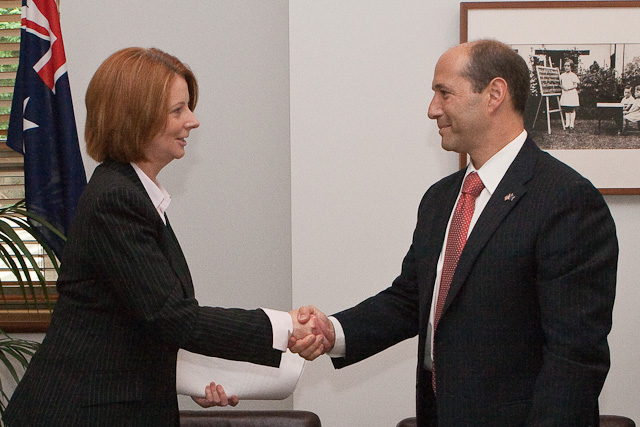
Gillard meets with US Ambassador Jeff Bleich on 26 November 2009

After the Labor Party's victory in the 2007 federal election, Gillard was sworn in as the first ever female deputy prime minister of Australia on 3 December 2007. In addition to being appointed to the position of deputy prime minister, Gillard was given responsibility for a so-called "super ministry", the Department of Education, Employment and Workplace Relations.

She was a member of the Strategic Priorities Budget Committee (SPBC) – also referred to as "Gang of Four" – which comprised Rudd and his most senior ministers: Gillard, Treasurer Wayne Swan and Finance Minister Lindsay Tanner. Formed in late-2007 as a result of an internal review, the SPBC was responsible for the government's handling of the 2008 financial crisis.

On 11 December 2007, Gillard was acting prime minister while Rudd attended the United Nations Climate Change Conference in Bali, becoming the first woman ever to hold that position. She assumed these duties for a total of 69 days throughout Rudd's tenure, during his various overseas travel engagements. Gillard quickly became known as a highly regarded debater, with her performances during parliamentary question time prompting Peter van Onselen to call her "the best parliamentary performer on the Labor side".

=== Ministerial portfolios ===
In her role as Minister for Education, Gillard travelled to Washington, D.C., in 2009, where she signed a deal with US Secretary of Education Arne Duncan to encourage improved policy collaboration in education reform between both countries. The establishment of the Australian Curriculum, Assessment and Reporting Authority (ACARA), an independent authority responsible for the development of a national curriculum, was amongst her first policy pursuits in 2008. She launched the government's "Digital Education Revolution" (DER) program, which provided laptops to all public secondary school students and developed quality digital tools, resources and infrastructure for all schools. In conjunction with DER, Gillard oversaw the "Building the Education Revolution" (BER) program, which allocated $16 billion to build new school accommodation including classrooms, libraries and assembly halls.

Gillard also ensured the implementation of the National Assessment Program – Literacy and Numeracy (NAPLAN) in 2008, whereby a series of standardised tests focused on basic skills are administered annually to Australian students. This was followed by the introduction of the My School website; launched in January 2010, the website reports on data from NAPLAN and displays information such as school missions, staffing, financial information, its resources and its students' characteristics.

As Minister for Employment and Workplace Relations, Gillard removed the WorkChoices industrial relations regime introduced by the Howard government, and replaced it with the Fair Work Act. This established a single industrial relations bureaucracy called Fair Work Australia.

== Prime Minister (2010–2013) ==
=== 2010 leadership vote ===
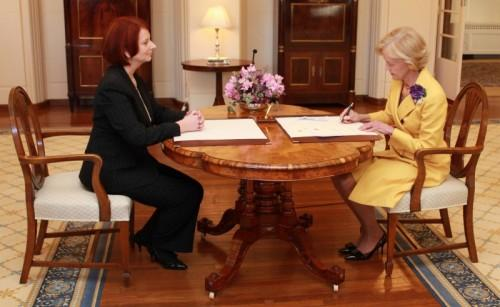
Gillard being sworn in as prime minister by Quentin Bryce on 24 June 2010

Prime Minister Kevin Rudd suffered a decline in his personal ratings, and a perceived loss of support among his own MPs, following the failure of the Government's insulation program, controversy regarding the implementation of a tax on mining, the failure of the government to secure passage of its carbon trading scheme and some policy debate about immigration policy. Significant disaffection had arisen within the Labor Party as to the leadership style and direction of Rudd. On 23 June 2010 he announced that Gillard had asked him to hold a leadership ballot the following day to determine the leadership of the Labor Party, and hence the prime ministership of Australia.

As late as May 2010, prior to challenging Rudd, Gillard was quipping to the media that "There's more chance of me becoming the full-forward for the Dogs than there is of any change in the Labor Party". Consequently, Gillard's move against Rudd on 23 June appeared to surprise many Labor backbenchers. Daryl Melham, when asked by a reporter on the night of the challenge if indeed a challenge was on, replied: "Complete garbage. ABC have lost all credibility." As he was being deposed, Rudd suggested that his opponents wanted to move Labor to the right, saying on 23 June: "This party and government will not be lurching to the right on the question of asylum seekers, as some have counselled us to do."

Initially, The Sydney Morning Herald reported that the final catalyst for the move on Rudd was sparked by a report that Rudd had used his chief of staff to sound out back benchers on his level of support, thus implying that "he did not trust the repeated assurances by Ms Gillard that she would not stand". Later, ABC's 7:30 Report said the seeds for the challenge to Rudd came from "factional heavyweights" Bill Shorten and Senator David Feeney, who secured the support of "New South Wales right power broker" Mark Arbib and that Feeney and Arbib went to discuss a challenge with Gillard on the morning of 23 June and a final numbers count began for a challenge. Accounts have continued to differ as to the extent of Gillard's foreknowledge and planning of the replacement of Rudd.

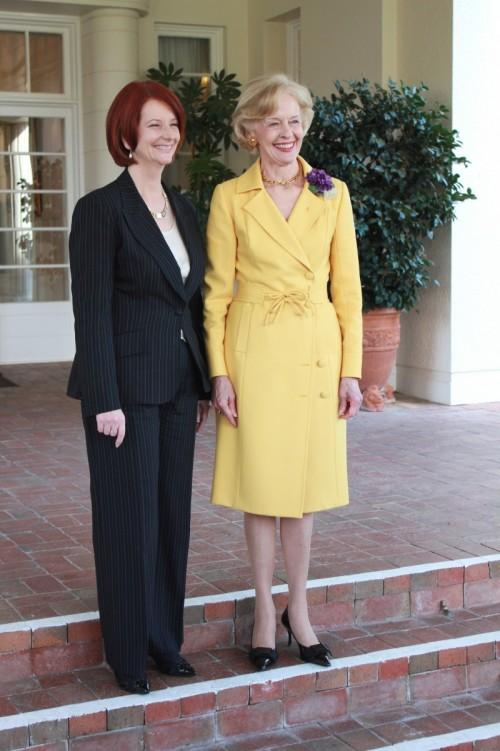
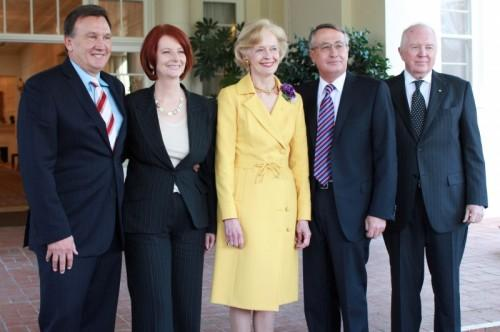
Gillard alongside partner Tim Mathieson, Quentin Bryce, Wayne Swan and Michael Bryce on 24 June 2010

Rudd initially said that he would challenge Gillard, but it soon became apparent that he did not have enough support within the party to survive in his position. Hours before the vote on 24 June, he resigned as prime minister and Leader of the Labor Party, leaving Gillard to assume the leadership unopposed. Treasurer Wayne Swan was at the same time elected unopposed to succeed Gillard as deputy leader.

Shortly afterward, Gillard was sworn in as the 27th prime minister of Australia by Governor-General Quentin Bryce, with Swan being sworn in as deputy prime minister. The members of the Rudd Ministry, with the exception of Rudd himself who returned to the backbenches, subsequently became the members of the First Gillard Ministry. It was the first time in Australian history that both the head of state as well as the head of government were female.

Later that day, in her first press conference as prime minister, Gillard said that at times the Rudd government "went off the tracks", and "[I] came to the view that a good Government was losing its way". Gillard offered wider explanation of her motivations for replacing Rudd during the 2012 Labor leadership spill in which Rudd challenged Gillard to regain the Labor leadership, telling the media that the Rudd government had entered a "period of paralysis" and that Rudd's work patterns were "difficult and chaotic".

Upon her election by the Labor Party, Gillard said that she wouldn't move into The Lodge until she was elected prime minister in her own right, instead choosing to divide her time between a flat in Canberra and her home in Altona, a western suburb of Melbourne. Gillard moved into The Lodge on 26 September 2010.

As well as being the first female prime minister, and the first never to have married, Gillard was the first prime minister since Billy Hughes to have been born overseas.

The leadership question remained a feature of the Gillard government's terms in office, and amidst ongoing leadership speculation following an ABC TV Four Corners examination of the events leading up to Rudd's replacement which cast doubt on Gillard's insistence that she did not actively campaign for the prime ministership, Attorney-general Nicola Roxon spoke of Rudd's record in the following terms: "I don't think we should whitewash history – while there are a lot of very good things our government did with Kevin as prime minister, there were also a lot of challenges, and it's Julia who has seen through fixing a lot of those problems."

=== 2010 election ===
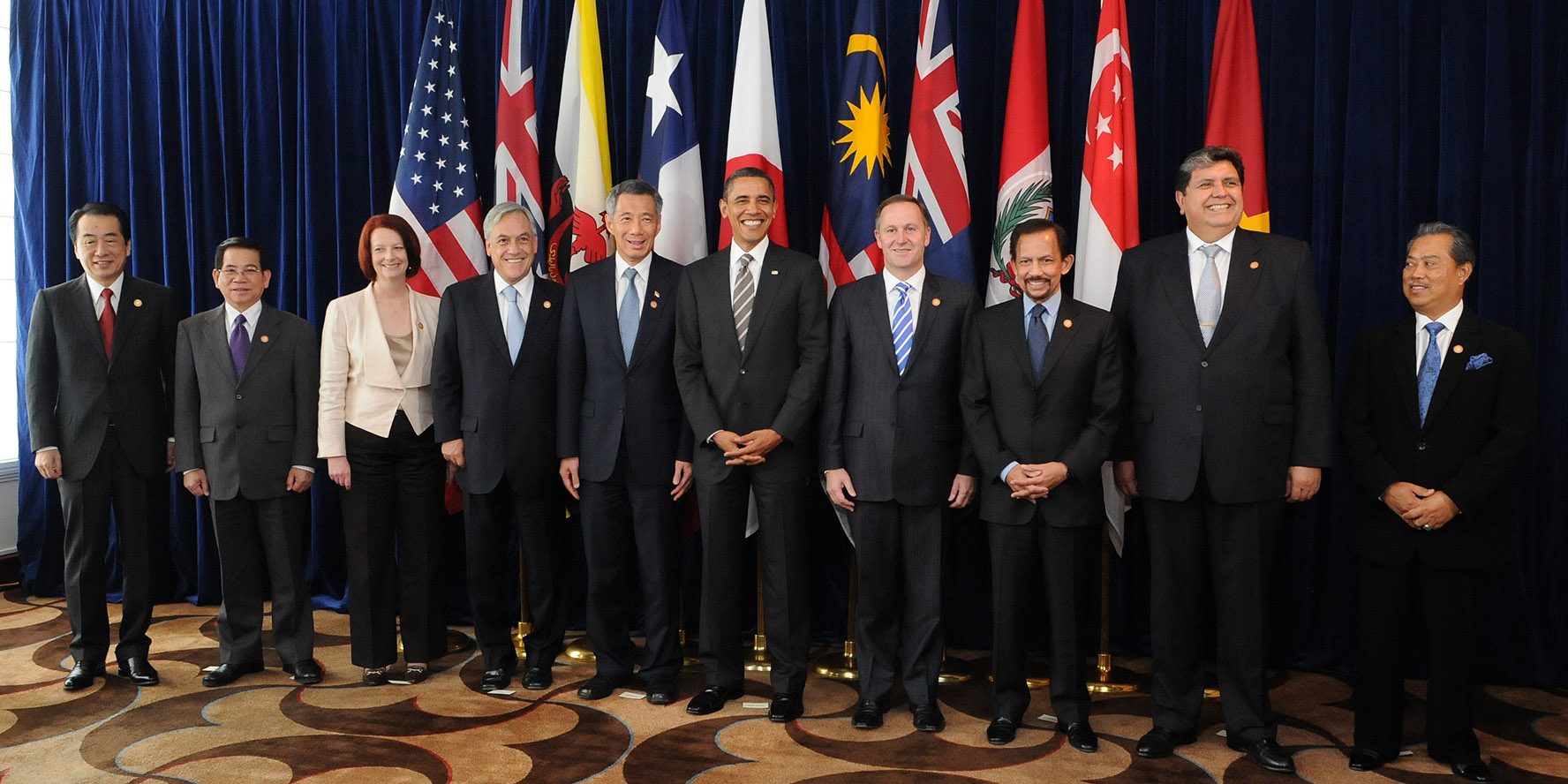
Gillard (3rd from left) attending a meeting of Trans-Pacific Partnership member state leaders

On 17 July 2010, 23 days after becoming prime minister and after receiving the agreement of the governor-general, Quentin Bryce, Gillard announced the next federal election would be held on 21 August 2010. Gillard began campaigning with a speech using the slogan "moving forward". In the early stages of the campaign, a series of leaks were released by purported Labor Party sources, indicating apparent divisions within Cabinet over the replacement of Kevin Rudd by Gillard. Midway through the campaign, Gillard offered journalists a self-assessment of her campaign by saying that she had been paying too much attention to advisers in her strategy team, and she wanted to run a less "stage-managed" campaign:

I think it's time for me to make sure that the real Julia is well and truly on display, so I'm going to step up and take personal charge of what we do in the campaign from this point.

Gillard met Opposition leader Tony Abbott for one official debate during the campaign. Studio audience surveys by Channel Nine and the Seven Network suggested a win to Gillard. Unable to agree on further debates, the leaders went on to appear separately on stage for questioning at community forums in Sydney and Brisbane, Queensland. An audience exit poll of the Rooty Hill RSL audience indicated an Abbott victory. Gillard won the audience poll at the Broncos Leagues Club meeting in Brisbane on 18 August. Gillard also appeared on the ABC's Q&A program on 9 August. On 7 August, Gillard was questioned by former Labor leader turned Channel Nine reporter Mark Latham.

Gillard officially "launched" Labor's campaign in Brisbane five days before polling day, outlining Labor policies and using the slogan: "Yes we will move forward together".

Labor and the Coalition each won 72 seats in the 150-seat House of Representatives, four short of the requirement for majority government, resulting in the first hung parliament since the 1940 election. Labor suffered an 11-seat swing, even though it won a bare majority of the two-party vote. Both major party leaders sought to form a minority government.

Six crossbench MPs held the balance of power. Four crossbench MPs, Greens Adam Bandt and independents Andrew Wilkie, Rob Oakeshott and Tony Windsor declared their support for Labor on confidence and supply, allowing Gillard and Labor to remain in power with a minority government. Governor-general Bryce swore in the Second Gillard Ministry on 14 September 2010.

=== Domestic policies ===
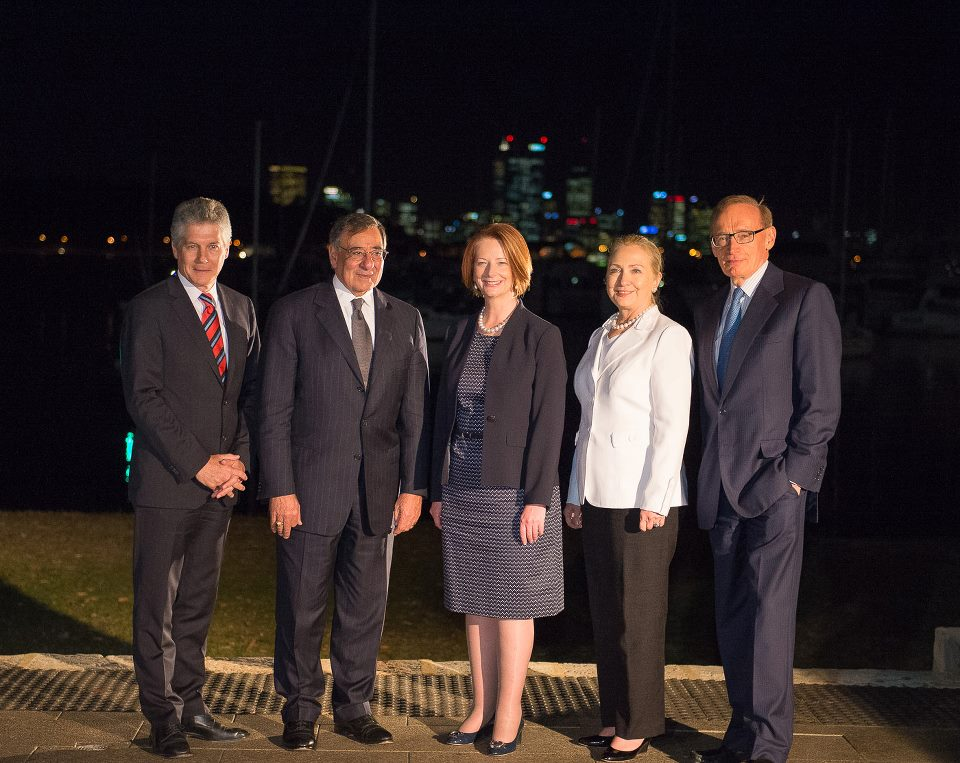
(L–R) Australian Defense Minister Stephen Smith, U.S. Secretary of Defense Leon Panetta, Gillard, U.S. Secretary of State Hillary Clinton, and Australian Foreign Minister Bob Carr, 2012

==== Economy ====
Gillard came to office in the aftermath of the 2008 financial crisis. Government receipts fell during the international downturn and the Rudd government had employed pump priming expenditure. Upon taking over as leader of the Labor Party on 24 June 2010, Gillard said she could "assure" Australians that the Federal Budget would be in surplus in 2013. The Government continued to promise this outcome until December 2012. Gillard initially ruled out a "carbon tax" but said that she would build community consensus for a price on carbon and open negotiations with the mining industry for a re-vamped mining profits tax. Following the 2010 hung parliament election result, the Labor Party elected to adopt the Australian Greens preference for a carbon tax to transition to an emissions trading scheme, establishing a carbon price via the Clean Energy Act 2011. The government also introduced a revised Minerals Resource Rent Tax and the Queensland Flood Levy.

In his 2012–13 Budget, Treasurer Swan announced that the government would deliver a $1.5 billion surplus. The government cut defence and foreign aid spending. In December 2012, Swan announced that the government no longer expected to achieve a surplus, citing falling revenue and global economic conditions.

==== Health ====
Like her predecessor Rudd, Gillard had said that health is a priority in her agenda. She announced during the 2010 election, that there would be an increase of 270 placements for emergency doctors and nurses and 3,000 extra nursing scholarships over the following 10 years. She also said mental health would be a priority in her second term, with a $277 million suicide-prevention package which would target high-risk groups. As the election delivered a hung parliament, a $1.8 billion package was given to rural hospitals, which was agreed to by the independents to support her re-election.

In October 2010, her government introduced legislation to reform funding arrangements for the health system, with the intention of giving the Commonwealth responsibility for providing the majority of funding to public hospitals and 100 per cent of funding for primary care and GP services. In February 2011, Gillard announced extensive revision of the original health funding reforms proposed by the Rudd government, which had been unable to secure the support of all state governments. The revised Gillard government plan proposed that the federal government move towards providing 50% of new health funding (and not 60 per cent as originally agreed) and removed the requirement of the states to cede a proportion of their GST revenue to the Federal Government to fund the new arrangement. The new agreement was supported by all state premiers and chief ministers and signed on 2 August.

==== Immigration ====
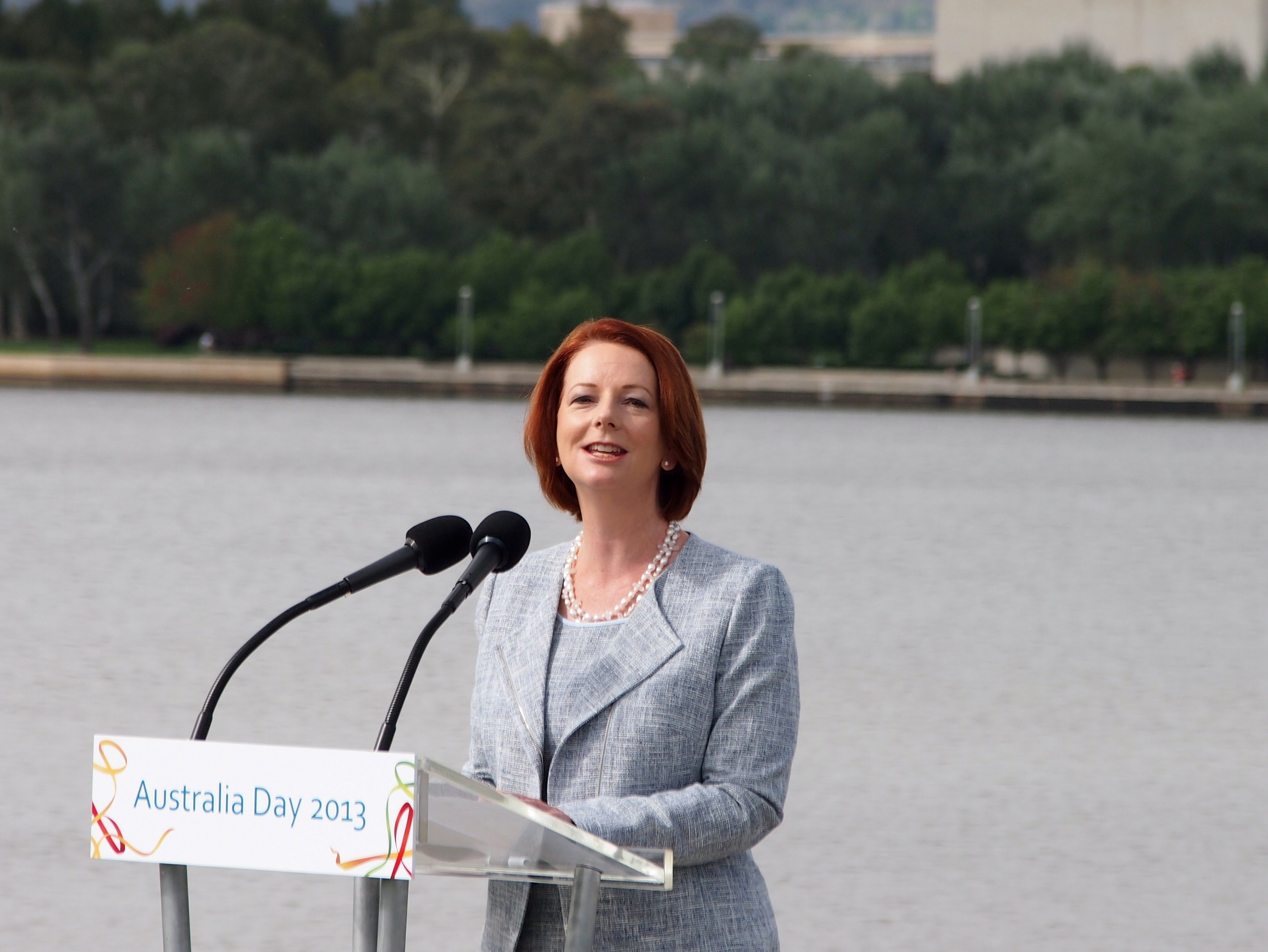
Gillard speaking at the National Flag Raising and Citizenship ceremony in Canberra, on 26 January 2013

In relation to population targets for Australia, Gillard told Fairfax Media in August 2010 that while skilled migration is important: "I don't support the idea of a big Australia". Gillard also altered the nomenclature of Tony Burke's role as "Minister for Population" to that of "Minister for Sustainable Population". The Government released a "sustainable population strategy" in May 2011 which did not specify a target population. In October 2011 trade minister Craig Emerson released a paper with Gillard's approval which advocated for continued rapid rates of population growth.

After winning leadership of the Labor Party, Gillard identified addressing the issue of unauthorised arrivals of asylum seekers as a priority of her government. She announced that negotiations were underway for a return to "offshore processing" of asylum seeker claims. Gillard ruled out a return to processing at Nauru and named East Timor as a preferred location for new detention and processing facilities. The East Timorese government rejected the plan.

In October 2010, her government announced that it would open two detention centres for 2000 immigrants, due to the pressures in allowing women and children to be released into the community. One was to be opened in Inverbrackie, South Australia, and one in Northam, Western Australia. She said it would be a short-term solution to the problem and that temporary detention centres would be closed.

On 15 December 2010, a ship containing 89 asylum seekers crashed on the shore of Christmas Island, killing up to fifty people. Refugee and migrant advocates condemned the government's hardline policy as responsible for the tragedy, and Labor Party president Anna Bligh called for a complete review of the party's asylum seeker policy. Gillard returned early from holidays in response to the crash, and to review asylum seeker policy. Some months later Gillard would announce "The Malaysia Solution" in response.

In April 2011, Australia's federal government confirmed that a detention centre for single men would be built at the old army barracks at Pontville, 45 minutes north of Hobart, Tasmania. This immigration detention centre would house up to 400 refugees. Also in April 2011, immigration detainees at the Villawood detention centre rioted in protest of their treatment, setting fire to several buildings.

In May 2011, Gillard announced that Australia and Malaysia were finalising an arrangement to exchange asylum seekers. Gillard and Immigration Minister Chris Bowen said they were close to signing a bilateral agreement which would result in 800 asylum seekers who arrive in Australia by boat being taken to Malaysia instead. Australia would take 4,000 people from Malaysia who have previously been assessed as being refugees. However, on 31 August, the High Court ruled that the agreement to transfer refugees from Australia to Malaysia was invalid, and ordered that it not proceed. Australia would still accept 4,000 people who have been assessed as refugees in Malaysia.

The asylum seeker debate returned during August 2012 following the report of the Expert Panel on Asylum Seekers, led by retired Air Chief Marshall Angus Houston. Accepting the panel's recommendation, Gillard on 12 August 2012 announced that a bill then before Parliament would be amended to allow the Government to choose sites for off-shore processing. At the same time she announced the Government would nominate the former detention centres on Nauru and Manus Island, Papua New Guinea to be re-opened. The amended bill passed with the support of the Opposition on 16 August 2012.

==== Education ====
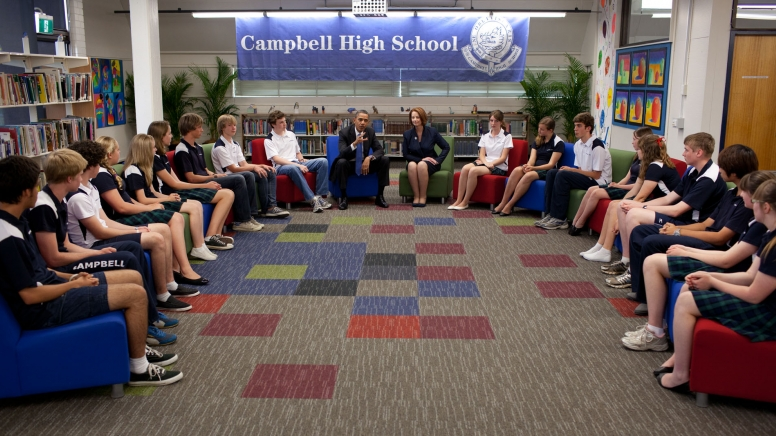
Gillard and U.S. President Barack Obama at Campbell High School

Gillard held the responsibilities of the Education portfolio for four days after becoming prime minister, before appointing Simon Crean as Education Minister on 28 June 2010. Following the 2010 election, Peter Garrett assumed the role of Minister for Education, where he remained until June 2013. Gillard also altered the nomenclature of "Minister for Innovation, Industry, Science and Research" to comprise tertiary education; Chris Evans, Chris Bowen, and later, Craig Emerson, each was Minister for Tertiary Education, Skills, Science and Research in the Gillard government.

At the July 2010 National Press Club, Gillard stated "I will make education central to my economic agenda because of the role it plays in developing the skills that lead to rewarding and satisfying work – and that can build a high-productivity, high-participation economy." The Gillard government in January 2011 extended tax cuts to parents to help pay for stationery, textbooks or computer equipment under the Education Tax Refund scheme.

As Education Minister under Rudd, Gillard commissioned David Gonski to be chairman of a committee to make recommendations regarding funding of education in Australia. The findings and recommendations of the committee were later presented to the Gillard government in November 2011, whereafter deliberations were entered into by the Federal and state governments to consider its content. The committee's report is known as the Gonski Report. Subsequently, the proposed reforms (an increase in funding) became known as "Gonski" and supporters urged governments to "Give a Gonski". The report was removed from the government website by the newly elected Abbott government after the 2013 federal election and is preserved by Australia's Pandora Archive.

Gillard continued to put the My School website centre of her education agenda, which was controversial at the time when she implemented it as Minister for Education. Although it was popular amongst parents, the website helped parents view statistics of the school their children attended. She had since unveiled the revamped version, My School 2.0, promising better information to parents.

Universities also placed highly on her education agenda. Legislation which would have been voted on in November 2010 would have seen the introduction of a national universities regulator; however, this was delayed until 2011 following criticisms from the higher education sector. It was also announced by her government that legislation to establish the Tertiary Education Quality and Standards Agency would also be introduced early 2011.

==== Climate change ====
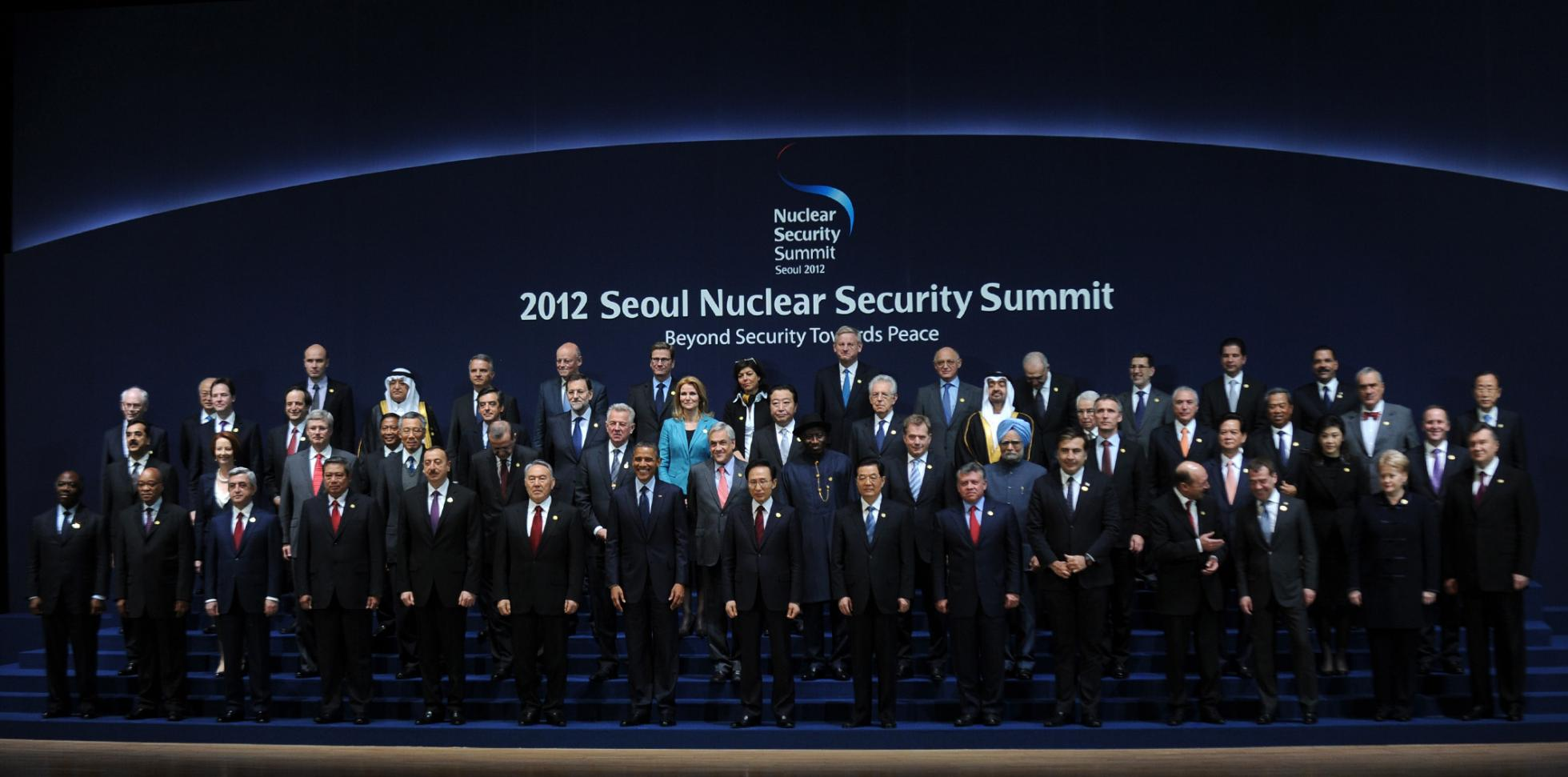
Gillard (second row, second from left) at the 2012 Nuclear Security Summit

The Rudd Labor opposition promised to implement an emissions trading scheme (ETS) before the 2007 federal election which Labor won. Rudd, unable to secure support for his scheme in the Senate, dropped it. During his 2012 leadership challenge against Gillard's prime ministership, Rudd said that it was Gillard and Swan who convinced him to delay his Emissions Trading Scheme.

In the 2010 election campaign, Gillard pledged to build a "national consensus" for a carbon price by creating a "citizens assembly", to examine "the evidence on climate change, the case for action and the possible consequences of introducing a market-based approach to limiting and reducing carbon emissions", over the course of one year. The assembly was to be selected by an independent authority who would select people from the electoral roll using census data. The plan was never implemented. After the 2010 Election, Gillard agreed to form a minority government with the Greens and Independents and replaced her "citizens assembly" plan with a climate change panel consisting of Labor, Greens and independent members of the Australian parliament. The panel ultimately announced backing for a temporary carbon tax, leading up to an Emissions Trading Scheme.

During the 2010 election campaign, Gillard also said that no carbon tax would be introduced under a government she led. In the first hung parliament result in 70 years, the Gillard government, with the support of the Australian Greens and some cross bench independents, negotiated the implementation of a carbon tax (the preferred policy of the Australian Greens), by which a fixed-price carbon tax would proceed to a floating-price ETS within a few years under the plans. The government proposed the Clean Energy Bill in February 2011, which the opposition claimed to be a broken election promise.

The bill was passed by the Lower House in October 2011 and the Upper House in November 2011.

==== Poker machines ====
In 2010, Gillard agreed with Nick Xenophon, Andrew Wilkie and the Australian Greens to introduce poker machine reform legislation (to curb gambling problem) into the Australian parliament by May 2012. After members of the cross bench advised that they would not support this bill in the Australian House of Representatives, Gillard withdrew her support. Wilkie said that many Australians felt "very let down by the PM", and fellow anti-gambling campaigner Xenophon accused the prime minister of "backstabbing the person who put her in office".

On 21 January 2012, Wilkie announced that he was withdrawing his support for the Gillard government after it broke the agreement he had signed with Gillard to implement mandatory precommitment for all poker machines by 2014. He stated that he would support the government's alternative plan to trial pre-commitment in the ACT and require that pre-commitment technology be installed in all poker machines built from 2013, but that this fell short of what he had been promised in return for supporting the government. In response, Gillard and Minister for Families, Housing, Community Services and Indigenous Affairs Jenny Macklin argued that there was not enough support in the House of Representatives for Wilkie's preferred option for it to be passed, and that they had been advised it was technically unfeasible to implement mandatory commitment within the time frame he had specified.

==== Same-sex marriage ====
The triennial Labor conference held in December 2011 saw Gillard successfully negotiate an amendment on same-sex marriage to see the party introduce a conscience vote to parliament through a private member's bill, rather than a binding vote. Despite Gillard, who had previously stated her personal objection to same-sex marriage, the motion passed narrowly by 208 votes to 184. In February 2012, two bills to allow same-sex marriage in Australia were introduced in the 43rd Parliament.

On 19 September 2012, the House of Representatives voted against passing its same-sex marriage bill by a margin of 98–42 votes. On 21 September 2012, the Senate also voted down its same-sex marriage legislation, by a vote of 41–26.

==== Forced adoptions ====
On 21 March 2013, Gillard delivered a national apology on behalf of the Australian Parliament to all those affected by the forced adoption practices that took place in Australia from the late–1950s to the 1970s. The apology, held in the Great Hall of Parliament House, was well–received by the 800 attendees, most of whom were victims or shared a connection to these practices. Gillard opened her speech by announcing that the Parliament would take responsibility for the practice of forced adoptions:

Today, this Parliament, on behalf of the Australian people, takes responsibility and apologises for the policies and practices that forced the separation of mothers from their babies which created a lifelong legacy of pain and suffering.

In the speech, Gillard committed to $5 million worth of specialist support and records tracing for victims of forced adoptions, and an additional $1.5 million towards the National Archives of Australia "to record the experiences of those affected by forced adoption through a special exhibition."

=== Commonwealth ===
Gillard represented Australia at the Wedding of Prince William and Catherine Middleton in London in April 2011 and hosted the Commonwealth Heads of Government Meeting (CHOGM) in Perth in October of that year. The Perth CHOGM saw the historic announcement, by Gillard and British prime minister David Cameron, of changes to the succession laws regarding to thrones of the Commonwealth realms, overturning rules privileging male over female heirs to the line of succession and removing a ban on Roman Catholic consorts. At the CHOGM, Gillard also hosted Queen Elizabeth II, Queen of Australia in what ended up being the monarch's final tour Down Under.

=== Foreign affairs ===
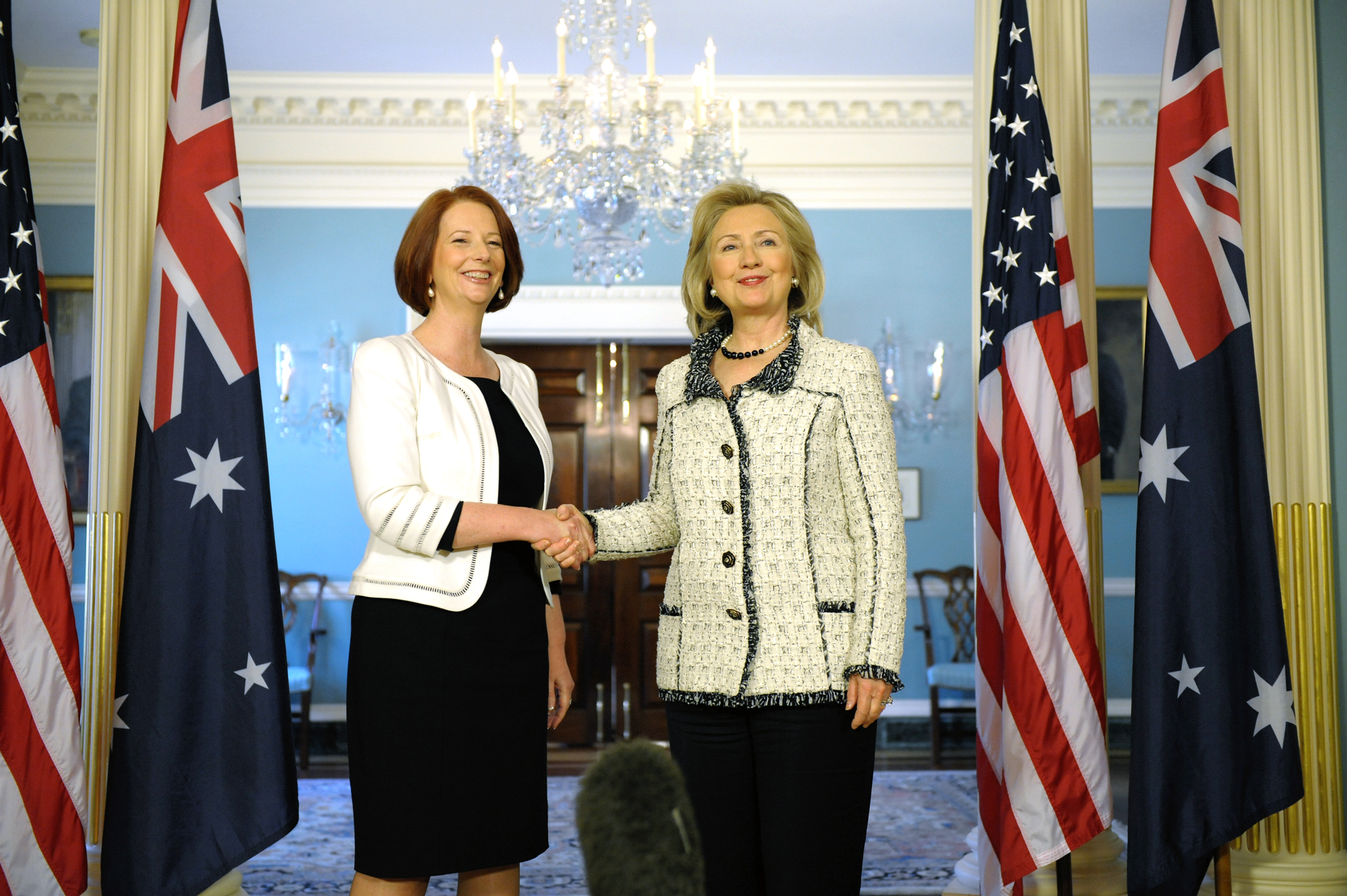
U.S. Secretary of State Hillary Clinton shakes hands with Gillard, 8 March 2011

During her first major international tour as prime minister in late 2010, Gillard told ABC TV's 7.30 Report:

Foreign policy is not my passion. It's not what I've spent my life doing. You know, I came into politics predominantly to make a difference to opportunity questions, particularly make a difference in education. So, yes, if I had a choice I'd probably more be in a school watching kids learn to read in Australia than here in Brussels at international meetings.

When Gillard replaced Rudd in 2010, Stephen Smith retained the portfolio of Foreign Affairs up until the 2010 election, when he was moved to Defence. Following her 2010 election victory, Gillard selected her former leader Kevin Rudd (a career diplomat) as Foreign Minister. After Rudd's unsuccessful leadership challenge in February 2012, Gillard appointed Bob Carr to succeed Rudd as Foreign Affairs Minister. When Gillard was not present in the Australia due to international commitments, or in other circumstances, Wayne Swan assumed the title of acting prime minister; when neither leader nor deputy were present in Australia, Leader of the Government in the Senate Chris Evans assumed the role, as occurred in October and November 2012.

After the creation of a no-fly zone, which Foreign Minister Kevin Rudd vocally supported, Gillard voiced strong support for the 2011 military intervention in Libya.

The Gillard government released the Asian Century White Paper in October 2012, offering a strategic framework for "Australia's navigation of the Asian Century". The report included focus on Australia's relations with China, India, the key ASEAN countries as well as Japan and South Korea.

On 19 October 2012, Australia secured election to a seat as a Non-Permanent Member of the United Nations Security Council. The initiative had been launched by the Rudd government, and further pursued under the Gillard government.

==== Afghanistan ====
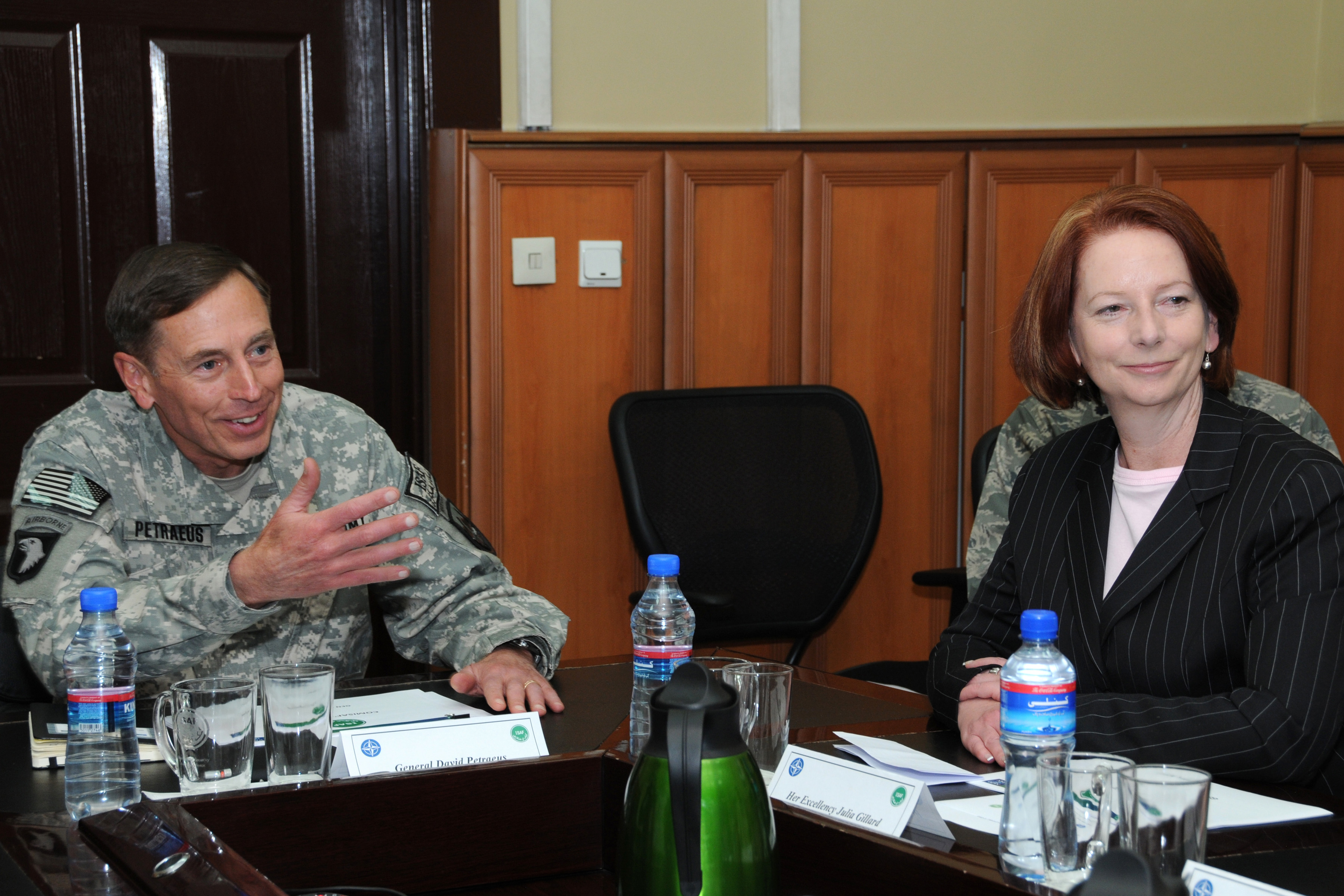
Gillard with General David Petraeus, the commander of the International Security Assistance Force, during a visit to Afghanistan on 2 October 2010

On her first day as prime minister, Gillard reassured US president Barack Obama of Australia's continuing support for the military campaign in Afghanistan, which was then in its ninth year of operation.

She visited Afghanistan on 2 October 2010, meeting with members of the Australian Defence Force in Tarinkot, and President Hamid Karzai in Kabul. The visit marked her first foreign trip as prime minister. Following the visit, A parliamentary debate was conducted for four sitting weeks of parliament in November 2010, with the agreement between Gillard and Abbott that it would be necessary for Australian soldiers to stay in Afghanistan and prevent it from becoming a safe haven for terrorists. She made her second trip to Afghanistan on 7 November 2011; much like her first trip, Gillard visited the 1,550 Australian troops based in Tarinkot, before meeting Karzai in Kabul where the two discussed the transition plans for Afghan military control. Whilst in Kabul, she opened Australia's newest embassy in Afghanistan.

In April 2012, Gillard announced at a speech to the Australian Strategic Policy Institute that her government would withdraw all Australian combat forces from Afghanistan by the end of 2013, a year earlier than anticipated; nevertheless, she also committed Australia to long-term military and financial support for Afghanistan in the years following the 2014 transition to military control. Gillard made her third and final trip to the country on 15 October 2012, where she met with President Kurzai, the governor of the Urozgan Province, before visiting the troops based in the aforementioned province.

==== India ====
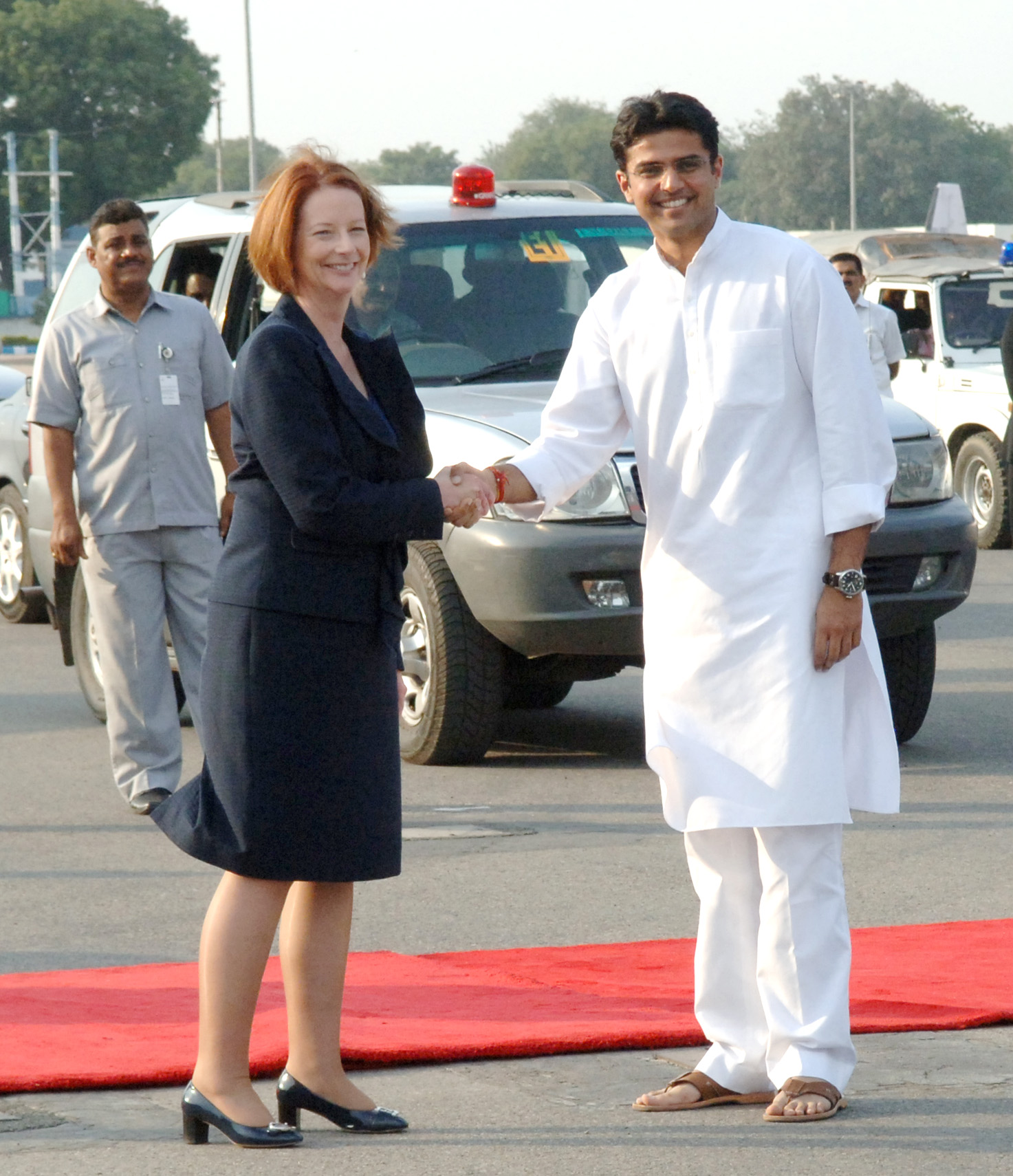
Gillard welcomed by the Minister of State for Communications and Information Technology, Shri Sachin Pilot, in New Delhi on 15 October 2012

Relations between Australia and India improved throughout Gillard's premiership, following a strained period between the two countries as a result of the Rudd government's decision to ban uranium sales to India in 2007, and the prolonged attacks against Indians living in Australia during 2009 to 2010.

In November 2011, Gillard announced a desire to allow uranium exports to India, as a matter of "national interest, a decision about strengthening our strategic partnership with India in this the Asian century." The Rudd government had previously blocked uranium sales to India as a result of the Indian Government not being a signatory of the Nuclear Non-Proliferation Treaty. The change in policy was supported a month later at the Labor Party National Conference, and Gillard reversed Australia's ban on exporting uranium to India on 4 December 2011. Gillard further expressed that any future agreement to sell uranium to India would include strict safeguards to ensure it would only be used for civilian purposes, and not end up in nuclear weapons.

Gillard made her prime-ministerial visit to India on 16 October 2012, for a three-day bilateral meeting with Prime Minister Manmohan Singh, where they negotiated the safeguards required prior to the commencement of uranium trading between India and Australia. The prospect of a quick trading arrangement was downplayed by both leaders in 2012; nevertheless, Gillard's efforts in brokering the deal was a precursor of the agreement being finalised between Prime Minister Tony Abbott and his Indian counterpart, Narendra Modi, in 2014. This was her second trip to India whilst in Government; on 31 August 2009, Gillard, then–deputy prime minister, met in India with Minister of Human Resource Development Kapil Sibal for the purpose of discussing the Australian Government's response to the string of attacks on Indian people living in Australia and attending Australian educational institutions.

==== New Zealand ====
Gillard maintained the close bonds between Australia and New Zealand throughout her tenure as prime minister. She had a close working relationship with her New Zealand counterpart, Prime Minister John Key, who was among the first international leaders to congratulate Gillard on gaining the premiership in June 2010. In late 2010, the World Trade Organization overturned Australia's 1921 import restriction on New Zealand apples on the basis such ban was 'unscientific', after the New Zealand Government had appealed against a decision by the Rudd government which imposed further quarantine measures. Gillard and Key had previously made a symbolic bet on the outcome of the 2011 Rugby World Cup held in New Zealand, whereby the losing team of either leader would eat an apple of whichever of the two countries won; New Zealand won, and Gillard would later honour the bet in February 2013, during a dinner with Key.

On 15 February 2011, Gillard made her first trip to New Zealand, during which she met with Key and held a luncheon with business leaders in Auckland. It marked the first New Zealand visit of a prime minister since Howard visited in 2007. To conclude her two-day visit to New Zealand, Gillard travelled to Wellington on 16 February, where she became the first foreign dignitary to address the New Zealand Parliament in its history. In her speech, Gillard reflected on the countries' close ties to one another, their shared defence history, and efforts to increase economic cooperation. Her second visit to New Zealand, coincided with the September 2011 gathering of the Pacific Islands Forum, held in Auckland, of which both Australia and New Zealand are members. Gillard made her final trip to New Zealand on 9 February 2013; visiting Queenstown, she and Prime Minister Key announced a deal on asylum seekers, which would see New Zealand accept 150 refugees annually from Australia, starting in 2014.

==== United States ====
An excerpt of Gillard's address to the US Congress, on 9 March 2011

In a 2008 speech in Washington, Gillard endorsed the ANZUS Alliance and described the United States as a civilising global influence. Her former colleague and leader Mark Latham wrote in a 2009 article for the Australian Financial Review that these comments were "hypocritical", given past private communications Gillard had exchanged with him which apparently mocked elements of American foreign policy: "One of them concerned her study tour of the US, sponsored by the American Government in 2006—or to use her moniker—'a CIA re-education course'. She asked me to 'stand by for emails explaining George Bush is a great statesman, torture is justified in many circumstances and those Iraqi insurgents should just get over it'."

On 9 March 2011, Gillard travelled to the United States to mark the 60th Anniversary of the ANZUS Alliance. She held formal meetings with President Barack Obama, Secretary of State Hillary Clinton, Treasury Secretary Timothy Geithner, and UN secretary-general Ban Ki-moon. She also met with First Lady Michelle Obama, and senior US Senator John McCain. Gillard addressed a joint session of the United States Congress, becoming the fourth Australian leader to do so and first foreign dignitary to address the 112th congress. In her speech to Congress, Gillard reiterated Australia's diplomatic and security alliance with the United States, and noted that the United States has "a true friend down under ... In both our countries, true friends stick together – in both our countries real mates talk straight ... So as a friend I urge you only this – be worthy to your best traditions. Be bold."

=== Gender politics ===
During the course of Gillard's prime ministership, sexism had been a contentious issue for a number of Labor and Greens Party figures, as well as some commentators. Former Labor Party advisor Anne Summers said in 2012 that "Gillard is being persecuted both because she is a woman and in ways that would be impossible to apply to a man". In reply, journalist Peter Hartcher wrote, "She was a woman when she was popular; she can't be unpopular now because she's a woman. The change is a result of her actions in office, not her gender."

==== Misogyny speech ====
In an August 2012 press conference regarding the AWU affair, Gillard was critical of The Australian newspaper for writing about her connection to the affair and of what she called "misogynist nut jobs on the internet". Gillard said that she had been "the subject of a very sexist smear campaign". In early October, the Opposition Leader's wife, Margie Abbott, accused the Gillard government of a deliberate campaign to smear Tony Abbott, on gender issues.

On 9 October 2012, Gillard also raised "sexism and misogyny" in a speech opposing a motion to remove Peter Slipper, her choice as Speaker of the House of Representatives, after revelations of inappropriate conduct on his part became public. Gillard linked the speech to the context of the then ongoing Alan Jones "died of shame" controversy. The speech was widely reported around the world. In Laos soon after for an Asian-European leaders conference, Gillard described comments by François Hollande and Helle Thorning-Schmidt: "The president of France congratulated me on the speech, as did the Prime Minister of Denmark, and some other leaders, just casually as I've moved around, have also mentioned it to me." US president Barack Obama reportedly "complimented" Gillard on the speech in a private conversation following his re-election, and his Secretary of State Hillary Clinton praised the speech as "very striking" with Gillard going "chapter and verse".

Labor had secured the defection of Slipper from the Liberal National Party of Queensland (LNP) to sit in the speaker's chair a year earlier, but he was forced to stand aside from his main duties in April 2012 pending the conclusion of a criminal investigation. After a week of controversy, Gillard announced that she was asking Slipper to delay his return to the chair pending the conclusion of concurrent civil proceedings, in an effort to dispel what she described as a "dark cloud" over her government (a reference also to the ongoing Craig Thomson affair involving a Labor MP linked to corruption allegations).

=== 2012 leadership vote ===
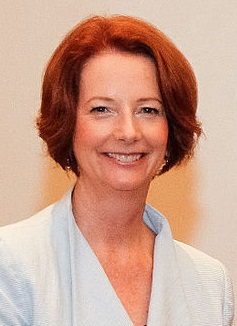
Gillard in 2012

In the light of poor polling results for the Gillard government, speculation that Foreign Minister and former prime minister Kevin Rudd wished to challenge Gillard for the leadership culminated with Rudd resigning from the Cabinet on 22 February 2012. Rudd told the media "I can only serve as Foreign Minister if I have the confidence of Prime Minister Gillard and her senior ministers" after Gillard failed to repudiate cabinet ministers who publicly criticised Rudd and his tenure as prime minister. The situation had been further exacerbated by the revelation on Four Corners that Gillard's staff wrote her victory speech for the 2010 leadership election two weeks prior to her challenge, contradicting Gillard's earlier claims that she had only resolved to challenge Rudd the day before the vote. This revelation caused particular conflict between Labor factions to surface, with Labor MP Darren Cheeseman calling on Gillard to resign, while his colleague Steve Gibbons called Rudd a "psychopath with a giant ego".

After resigning, Rudd stated that he did not think Gillard could defeat the Coalition at the next election and that, since his resignation, he had received encouragement from Labor MPs and Cabinet Ministers to contest the leadership. Gillard responded to these developments by announcing a leadership ballot for the morning of 27 February 2012, saying that if she lost the vote she would return to the backbench and renounce any claims to the leadership. She asked that Rudd make the same commitment.

At the leadership ballot, Gillard won comfortably by a vote of 71 to 31.

=== March 2013 leadership vote ===
Despite Gillard's defeating Kevin Rudd comfortably in the 2012 leadership spill, tensions remained in the Labor Party regarding Gillard's leadership. After Labor's polling position worsened in the wake of Gillard announcing the date of the 2013 election, these tensions came to a head when former Labor Leader and Regional Minister Simon Crean called for a leadership spill and backed Rudd on 21 March 2013. In response, Gillard sacked Crean from his position, and called a leadership spill for 4.30 pm that same day.

Ten minutes before the ballot was due to occur, Rudd publicly announced that he would not contest the leadership, in line with the commitment he had made following the 2012 contest. Gillard and Wayne Swan were the only candidates for the Leadership and Deputy Leadership of the Labor Party, and were elected unopposed. This marked the first time in history that an incumbent Labor Leader was elected unopposed at a leadership ballot. Several ministers subsequently resigned from the government, including Chief Government Whip Joel Fitzgibbon, Human Services Minister Kim Carr, and Energy Minister Martin Ferguson.

Gillard declared that the question of the Labor leadership was now "settled". Nevertheless, speculation on Gillard's leadership remained a major issue, with polling results indicating an electoral disaster were she to lead the Labor Party into the election. In light of this, media attention once more turned to Kevin Rudd as a possible replacement in the short term. It was reported that Gillard's supporter Bill Shorten was under pressure to ask her to resign, creating a vacancy that Rudd would contest.

=== June 2013 leadership vote ===
By the end of June 2013, Labor's standing in the polls had worsened, and the Coalition had been leading in most opinion polls for two years; one poll in early June showed that Labor would be reduced to as few as 40 seats after the next election. With a general election due later that year, even some staunch Gillard supporters began to believe that Labor faced almost certain defeat if Gillard continued as leader. According to the ABC's Barrie Cassidy, the question was not whether Gillard would be ousted as Labor leader, but when the ousting would take place.

Following further speculation over her leadership, on 26 June a rumour emerged that supporters of Kevin Rudd were collecting signatures for a letter demanding an immediate leadership vote. That afternoon, before any letter had been published, Gillard called a leadership spill live on television. She challenged any would-be opponent to join her in a pledge that, while the winner would become leader, the loser would immediately retire from politics. Despite his earlier comments that he would not return to the leadership under any circumstances, Kevin Rudd announced that he would challenge Gillard for the leadership, and committed to retiring from politics if he lost. In the party-room ballot later that evening, Rudd defeated Gillard by a margin of 57 votes to 45.

=== Resignation and retirement from politics ===
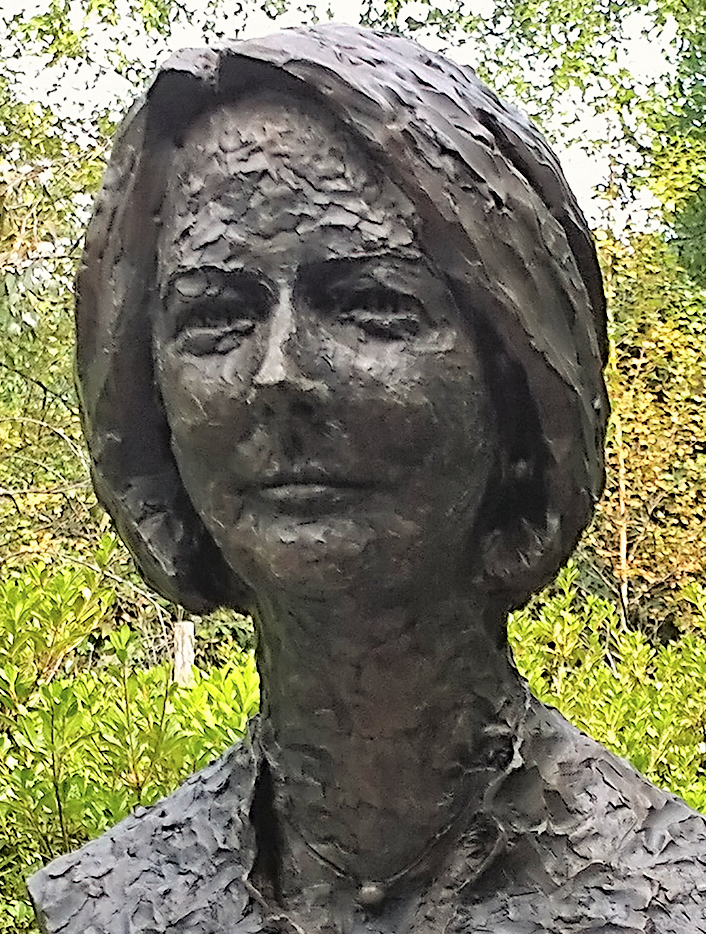
Bronze bust of Julia Gillard at the Prime Minister's Avenue in the Ballarat Botanical Gardens

Following her defeat in the leadership vote on 26 June 2013, Gillard congratulated Rudd on his win and announced that she would immediately tender her resignation as prime minister to the governor-general, Quentin Bryce. She also announced, in keeping with her pledge before the leadership vote, that she would not re-contest her Labor seat at the upcoming election, and thus would retire from politics.

Gillard's resignation as prime minister took effect the following day, upon the swearing in of Rudd, and she made her final appearance in the House of Representatives shortly thereafter. Her parliamentary service ended at the dissolution of the Parliament on 5 August. By the conclusion of her tenure, Gillard overtook Gough Whitlam as the 15th longest-serving Prime Minister of Australia, having served in the position for three full years. She also became the longest-serving Prime Minister since John Howard's electoral loss in 2007, a record which was not exceeded until August 2021, when Scott Morrison overtook her as the 14th longest-serving Prime Minister of Australia.

Subsequent to the federal election held on 7 September 2013, Gillard was succeeded as the Member for Lalor by her preferred replacement, Joanne Ryan, a former school principal.

== Political positions ==
=== Political philosophy ===
Although nominally a member of the Victorian Left faction of the Labor Party, her election to Prime Minister occurred because of support from the Labor Right faction, with the Labor Left planning to support Rudd in the Caucus vote had there actually been one. Analyses of Jacqueline Kent's 2009 biography of Gillard suggest that her membership in the Left faction is "more organisational than ideological". In July 2010, historian Ross Fitzgerald said that "at least since [2009] Gillard has sought to reposition herself more towards the Labor Right."

=== Civil liberties and democracy ===
Gillard supports Australia becoming a republic and has suggested that the end of Queen Elizabeth II's reign would be "probably the appropriate point for a transition". Following the elevation of republican Malcolm Turnbull to the prime-ministership in September 2015, Gillard along with Rudd tweeted their support for Peter FitzSimons, the head of the Australian Republican Movement, and his call for new members to join the movement.

Following the November 2010 release of secret United States diplomatic cables, Gillard stated, "I absolutely condemn the placement of this information on the WikiLeaks website. It's a grossly irresponsible thing to do and an illegal thing to do." After an Australian Federal Police investigation failed to find WikiLeaks had broken any Australian laws by publishing the US diplomatic documents, Gillard maintained her stance that the release of the documents was "grossly irresponsible".

=== Social policy ===
Gillard expressed support for legal abortion in 2005, saying that "Women without money would be left without that choice or in the hands of backyard abortion providers" and that she understood "the various moral positions" regarding abortions. Pertaining to unplanned pregnancies and counselling, Gillard is of the view that women ought to be counselled by someone of their choice – as opposed to only trained professionals referred to by their general practitioners. In August 2012, Gillard reiterated her position in support of abortion, stating that "Women must have the right to healthcare and women must have the right to choose."

In response to a 2012 report by think-tank Australia 21, which recommended the relaxation of illicit drug laws in Australia, Gillard rejected the report and claimed that "drugs kill people they rip families apart, they destroy lives ... I am not in favour of decriminalisation of any of our drug laws."

Concerning euthanasia, Gillard warned that it may "open the door to exploitation and perhaps callousness towards people in the end stage of life" and that she is not convinced that the policy of pro-euthanasia advocates contain "sufficient safeguards".

Gillard, as a member of parliament, voted against a bill that would have legalised same-sex marriage in Australia in 2011. In 2010 she stated "the Marriage Act is appropriate in its current form, that is recognising that marriage is between a man and a woman" and that marriage being between a man and woman "has a special status". The triennial Labor conference held in December 2011 saw Gillard successfully negotiate an amendment on same-sex marriage to see the party introduce a conscience vote to parliament through a private member's bill, rather than a binding vote. When the private members bill was introduced by Labor backbencher Stephen Jones, it was defeated in the House of Representatives on 19 September 2012. In September 2014, Gillard said that the "course of human history now is that we are going to see same-sex marriage here and in, you know, most parts of the developed world." She declared her support for same-sex marriage in August 2015.

== Post-political career (2013–present) ==
=== Publications and appearances ===
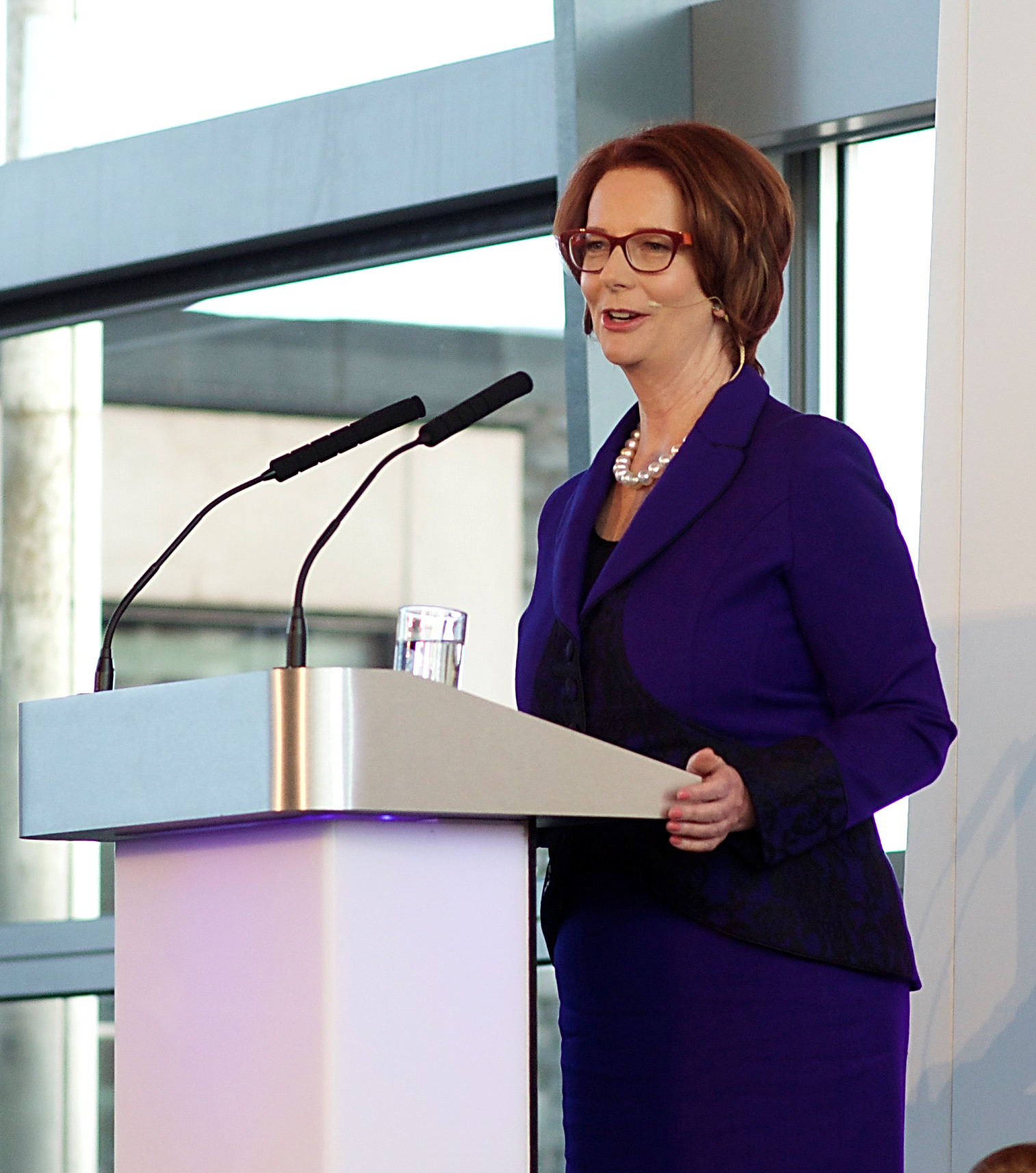
Gillard delivers a keynote address to the National Assembly for Wales on the representation of women in public life, in July 2015

In July 2013, Gillard signed a book deal for her memoirs with Penguin Australia. The autobiography, My Story, was published in 2014 by Random House. In the book, Gillard reflects on various personal aspects of her life and career, including her own analysis of the people and key players during the Rudd–Gillard governments. Senator Nick Xenophon was said to have been "infamously excluded from university for a period as punishment for stuffing a ballot box full of voting papers he had somehow procured", which was denied by Xenophon. In February 2015, Random House issued a public apology to Xenophon and paid a confidential cash settlement. Following requests from Xenophon for a personal apology from Gillard, on 6 August 2015 she published a personal apology to him in a number of Australian newspapers.

Following her departure from parliament at the 2013 election, Gillard has remained engaged with the Labor Party. After Labor's defeat at the federal election held in September 2013, Gillard penned an op-ed for Guardian Australia, wherein she wrote about her legacy and how she believes the Labor Party ought to rebuild. In June 2015, Gillard participated in Sarah Ferguson's The Killing Season, a three-part documentary series which chronicles the events of the Rudd–Gillard years in power. The television series featured in-depth interviews with key Labor Party officials during the Rudd–Gillard governments. Prior to the 2016 election campaign, Gillard offered her assistance to the Labor party, whereby a video was released of her endorsing and seeking donations for the party's education policy. She later joined former Labor prime ministers Bob Hawke and Paul Keating at Bill Shorten's Labor campaign launch on 19 June 2016.

She had been a supporter of Hillary Clinton's Democratic Party candidacy for President of the United States, from as early as September 2014 when Gillard announced that she would "loudly barrack from the sidelines" should Clinton run. Having endorsed Clinton after she announced her candidacy in April 2015, Gillard appeared in a campaign video in October, wherein she advocated for the presidential candidate and her leadership surrounding women's issues. Gillard attended the first day of the Democratic National Convention in Philadelphia on 25 July 2016, alongside former US Secretary of State Madeleine Albright. The following day, Gillard published an open letter to Clinton in The New York Times, urging voters to "shame sexism" levied against the Democratic presidential candidate.

=== Honours and appointments ===
In April 2014, Gillard was admitted to the degree of Doctor of Victoria University, honoris causa, for her accomplishments surrounding education and disability reform as a political leader. On 11 February 2015, Gillard received an honorary doctorate from the Vrije Universiteit Brussel "for her achievements as a woman committed to education and to social inclusion, and for the impact of her commitment on the situation of children, youngsters and women worldwide"; and she also held a Kapuscinski Development Lecture on "the importance of education in development contexts" at the said university. In October, she received an honorary doctorate from the University of Canberra, for her work in "education and gender equality." In January 2016 she opened the Julia Gillard Library in the Melbourne suburb of Tarneit; the library's name was selected by the Wyndham City Council to recognise her contributions as both the local member of parliament and prime minister. Gillard was conferred an Honorary Doctorate of Laws by Deakin University, for her promotion of "education opportunities in Australia, especially to groups under-represented in higher education", in December 2016.

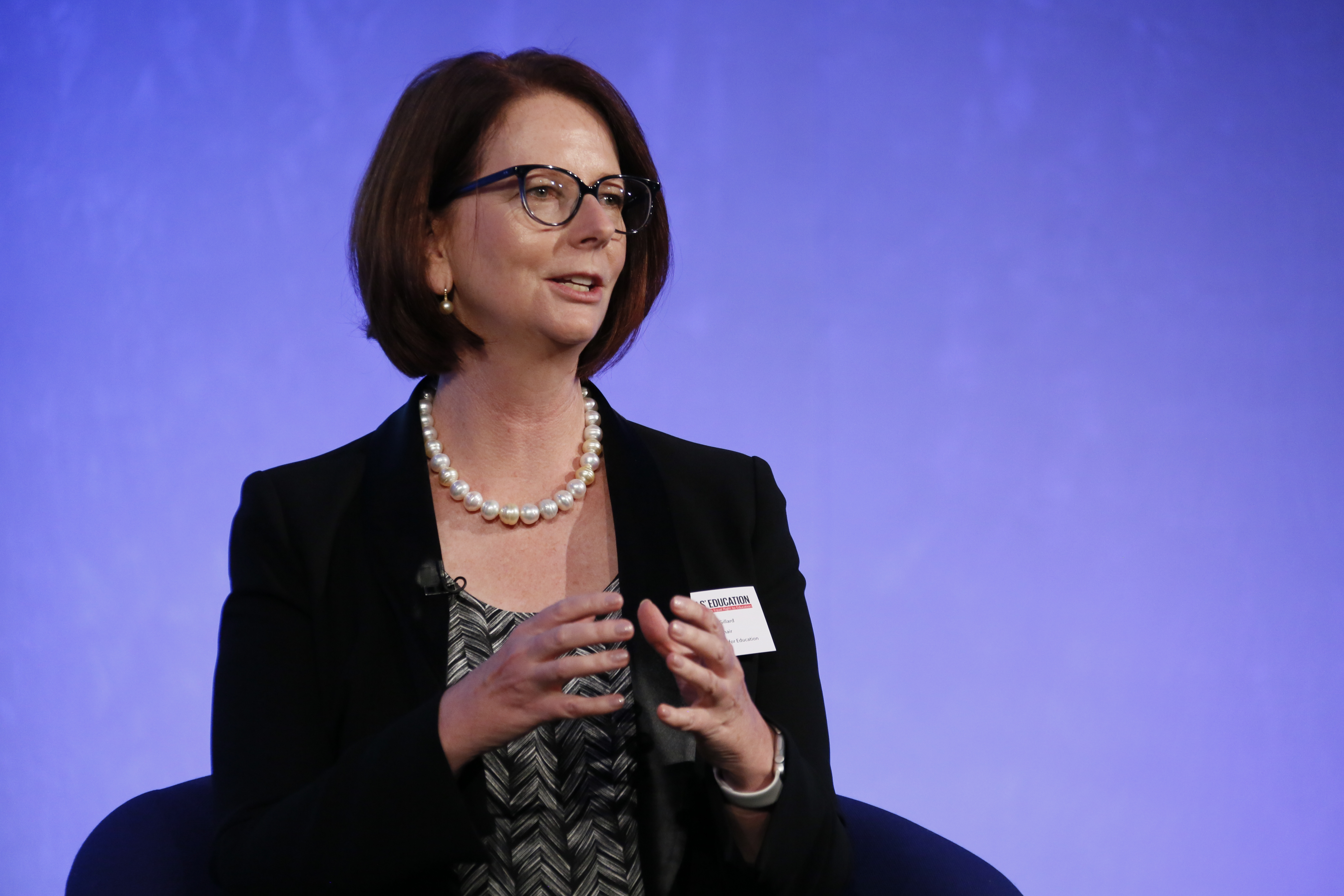
Gillard at the Girls' Education Forum, held in London on 7 July 2016

Having moved back to Adelaide, Gillard was appointed an honorary visiting professor of Politics at the University of Adelaide in 2013. In October of that year, she joined the Brookings Institution's Center for Universal Education as a nonresident senior fellow. In February 2014, Gillard was appointed chairwoman of the Global Partnership for Education, an international organisation focused on getting all children into school for a quality education in the world's poorest countries. Later that year, in December, Gillard joined the board of the mental health organisation Beyond Blue, chaired by former Victorian premier Jeff Kennett. Kennett announced on 21 March 2017 that he would be stepping down from the position during the second–half of the year, almost 17 years after founding the organisation; Gillard succeeded him as chair of Beyond Blue on 1 July 2017, becoming the first former prime minister since Malcolm Fraser to head a mental-health organisation. Since February 2015 she has been the patron of the John Curtin Prime Ministerial Library at Curtin University in Perth. On 30 June 2015, she was conferred with a fellowship from Aberystwyth University in recognition of her "significant contribution to political life". In September 2016 Gillard was appointed a visiting professor at King's College London, joining the King's Policy Institute to chair the Global Institute for Women's Leadership, as well as the Menzies Centre for Australian Studies.

In 2017, Gillard was appointed a Companion of the Order of Australia (AC) "for eminent service to the Parliament of Australia, particularly as Prime Minister, through seminal contributions to economic and social development, particularly policy reform in the areas of education, disability care, workplace relations, health, foreign affairs and the environment, and as a role model to women." According to The West Australian, one of her nominators for the award was then–Prime Minister Tony Abbott, who wrote a letter testifying to her suitability for the honour in 2014. Gillard is the most recent former prime minister to have received such award since John Howard in 2008, and the sixth prime minister overall. In July 2017 she took up her appointment as chair of Beyond Blue.

In 2018 she was listed as one of BBC's 100 Women.

In April 2021, Gillard was appointed chair of the board of governors at Wellcome Trust, one of the most richly-endowed philanthropic charitable trusts, headquartered in London UK but with global reach, supporting research and innovation in medicine, public health, mental health and climate change. In April 2021, Gillard was honoured by the award of the Grand Cordon of the Order of the Rising Sun from the Government of Japan, which was formally presented by the Ambassador of Japan to Australia in a ceremony held on 4 February 2022. Gillard is the 8th Australian prime minister to receive the award, after Edmund Barton, Robert Menzies, John McEwen, Gough Whitlam, Malcolm Fraser, Bob Hawke, and John Howard. On 26 October 2023, she was awarded an honorary fellowship at Girton College, Cambridge.

In December 2023, Gillard retired as Chair of Beyond Blue and was succeeded by Sam Mostyn.

== Royal Commission into early education in South Australia ==
In October 2022 it was announced that Gillard would be leading the Royal Commission into Early Childhood Education and Care. In August 2023 Gillard authorised the release of the final report from the Royal Commission.

== Personal life ==
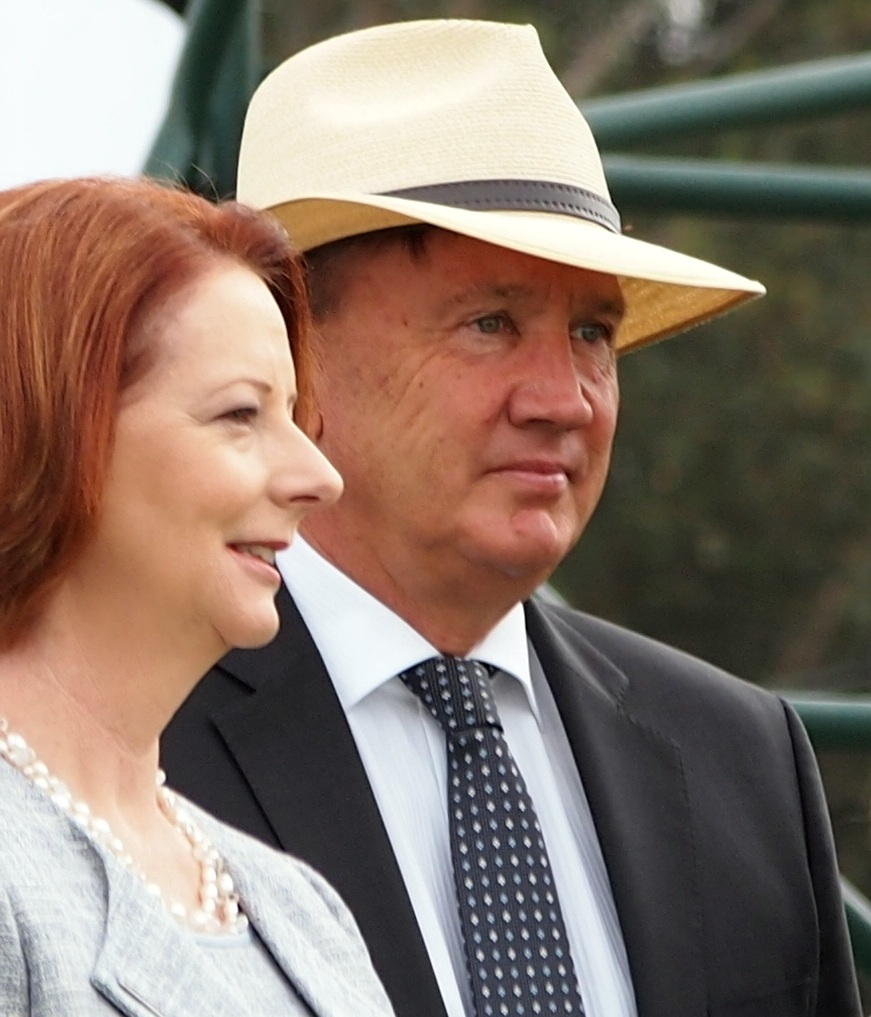
Gillard with her partner, Tim Mathieson, in 2013

Gillard met Tim Mathieson in 2004, and they began a relationship in 2006. The relationship ended in 2020 or 2021.

Gillard's mother told ABC TV's Australian Story program that Gillard had spoken from a young age of never wanting children. Gillard herself told the program that while she admired women who could balance child rearing with a career, "I'm not sure I could have. There's something in me that's focused and single-minded and if I was going to do that, I'm not sure I could have done this."

Gillard owned a single-storey home in the south-western Melbourne suburb of Altona, which she occupied prior to The Lodge and sold in December 2013. She is a public supporter of the Western Bulldogs in the Australian Football League and the Melbourne Storm in the National Rugby League. She currently resides in Adelaide, in the beachside suburb of Brighton.

Gillard was brought up in the Baptist tradition, but is an atheist. In a 2010 interview, when asked if she believed in God, she stated: "No, I don't ... I'm not a religious person ... I'm a great respecter of religious beliefs but they're not my beliefs." Comparing Australia to the United States in a 2013 interview with The Washington Post, she stated: "I think it would be inconceivable for me if I were an American to have turned up at the highest echelon of American politics being an atheist, single and childless." In her 2014 autobiography, My Story, Gillard stated, "Kevin had to be the leader in our alliance because I understood that I was not what Labor needed at that point: a woman, not married, an atheist."

Gillard has admitted to having smoked cannabis, but said she "didn't like it".

=== AWU affair ===
Gillard worked in the industrial department of the law firm Slater & Gordon from 1988 through to 1995. In the early 1990s, she was in a relationship with Bruce Wilson, an official of the Australian Workers' Union (AWU). Gillard provided pro-bono legal assistance to help establish the AWU Workplace Reform Association for Wilson and his associate Ralph Blewitt. She was also involved in providing legal services in relation to the purchase of a Fitzroy property by Wilson and Blewitt. Wilson and Blewitt have been accused of creating the association to use a slush fund for personal benefit, including diverting funds for the purchase of the house in Fitzroy.

Slater & Gordon investigated Gillard's conduct and concluded that she had no case to answer. Gillard has denied any wrongdoing. A subsequent Royal Commission into union corruption found that Gillard had not committed or known of any criminal activity, but had displayed a lapse in professional judgement.

== Works ==
- Gillard, Julia (2014). My Story. North Sydney, N.S.W.: Random House Australia. ISBN 978-0-85798-391-6. OCLC 882414735.
- Gillard, Julia; Okonjo-Iweala, Ngozi (2020). Women and Leadership: Real lives, real lessons. Australia: Vintage Books. ISBN 978-0-14-379428-8. OCLC 1138642798.

== See also ==
- At Home with Julia, a satirical television series
- List of elected or appointed female heads of government
- List of female heads of government in Australia

Parliament of Australia
| Preceded by Barry Jones | Member for Lalor; 1998–2013 | Succeeded by Joanne Ryan |
Party political offices
| Preceded by Jenny Macklin | Deputy Leader of the Australian Labor Party; 2006–2010 | Succeeded by Wayne Swan |
| Preceded by Kevin Rudd | Leader of the Australian Labor Party; 2010–2013 | Succeeded by Kevin Rudd |
Political offices
| Preceded by Mark Latham | Manager of Opposition Business in the House; 2003–2006 | Succeeded by Anthony Albanese |
| Preceded by Jenny Macklin | Deputy Leader of the Opposition; 2006–2007 | Succeeded by Julie Bishop |
| Preceded by Julie Bishop | Minister for Education; 2007–2010 | Succeeded by Simon Crean |
| Preceded by Joe Hockey | Minister for Employment and Workplace Relations; 2007–2010 | Succeeded by Simon Crean |
| Preceded by Mike Rann | Minister for Social Inclusion; 2007–2010 | Succeeded by Simon Crean |
| Preceded by Mark Vaile | Deputy Prime Minister of Australia; 2007–2010 | Succeeded by Wayne Swan |
| Preceded by Kevin Rudd | Prime Minister of Australia; 2010–2013 | Succeeded by Kevin Rudd |
Diplomatic posts
| Preceded by Kamla Persad-Bissessar | Chair of the Commonwealth of Nations; 2011–2013 | Succeeded by Kevin Rudd |
Positions in intergovernmental organisations
| Preceded by Carol Bellamy | Chair of the Global Partnership for Education; 2014–present | Incumbent |
