= Kevin Rudd =

Prime Minister of Australia (2007–2010; 2013)

The Honourable Kevin Rudd AC
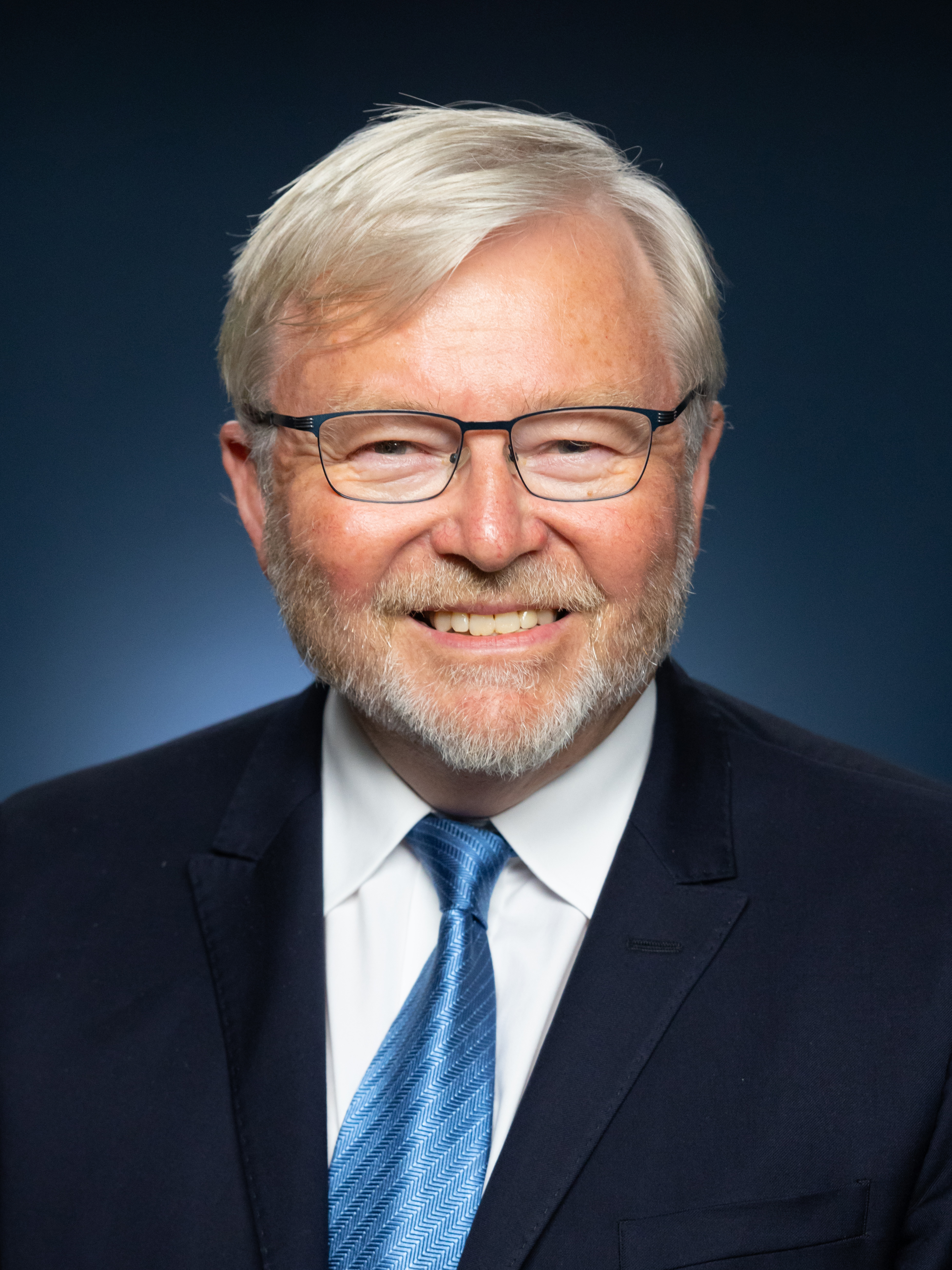
- Official portrait, 2023

26th Prime Minister of Australia
- In office 27 June 2013 – 18 September 2013
- Monarch: Elizabeth II
- Governor General: Quentin Bryce
- Deputy: Anthony Albanese
- Preceded by: Julia Gillard
- Succeeded by: Tony Abbott
- In office 3 December 2007 – 24 June 2010
- Monarch: Elizabeth II
- Governors General: Michael Jeffery; Quentin Bryce
- Deputy: Julia Gillard
- Preceded by: John Howard
- Succeeded by: Julia Gillard

23rd Ambassador of Australia to the United States
- In office 20 March 2023 – 31 March 2026
- Prime Minister: Anthony Albanese
- Preceded by: Arthur Sinodinos
- Succeeded by: Greg Moriarty

18th Leader of the Labor Party
- In office 26 June 2013 – 13 September 2013
- Deputy: Anthony Albanese
- Preceded by: Julia Gillard
- Succeeded by: Bill Shorten (Note: Chris Bowen acted from 13 September 2013 to 13 October 2013.)
- In office 4 December 2006 – 24 June 2010
- Deputy: Julia Gillard
- Preceded by: Kim Beazley
- Succeeded by: Julia Gillard

Leader of the Opposition
- In office 4 December 2006 – 3 December 2007
- Prime Minister: John Howard
- Deputy: Julia Gillard
- Preceded by: Kim Beazley
- Succeeded by: Brendan Nelson

Minister for Foreign Affairs
- In office 14 September 2010 – 22 February 2012
- Prime Minister: Julia Gillard
- Preceded by: Stephen Smith
- Succeeded by: Bob Carr

Member of the Australian Parliament for Griffith
- In office 3 October 1998 – 22 November 2013
- Preceded by: Graeme McDougall
- Succeeded by: Terri Butler

Personal details
- Born: Kevin Michael Rudd; 21 September 1957 (age 69) Nambour, Queensland, Australia
- Party: Labor
- Spouse: Thérèse Rein (m. 1981)
- Children: 3
- Profession: Politician; diplomat
- Website: Official website
- Nickname: Kevin 07

Academic background
- Education: Australian National University (BA); Jesus College, Oxford (DPhil)
- Thesis: China's New Marxist Nationalism: Defining Xi Jinping's Ideological Worldview (2022)
- Doctoral advisor: Paul Irwin Crookes
- Kevin Rudd's voice Rudd speaking about his government's economic plan Recorded 27 August 2013

Kevin Michael Rudd (born 21 September 1957) is an Australian diplomat and former politician who served as the 26th prime minister of Australia from 2007 to 2010 and from June to September 2013, holding office as the leader of the Labor Party. From 2023 to 2026, Rudd was the ambassador of Australia to the United States.

Born on the Sunshine Coast, Rudd graduated from the Australian National University in 1981 with honours in Chinese studies, and is fluent in Mandarin. Before politics, he worked as a diplomat and public servant for the Queensland state government of Wayne Goss. Rudd was elected to the House of Representatives at the 1998 federal election, winning the Queensland division of Griffith. He was promoted to the shadow cabinet in 2001 as Shadow Minister for Foreign Affairs. He assumed leadership of the Labor Party in December 2006 by defeating Kim Beazley in a leadership spill, becoming leader of the opposition. Rudd led Labor to a landslide victory at the 2007 election; his government's earliest acts included ratifying the Kyoto Protocol on climate change and delivering the first national apology to Australia's Indigenous peoples for the Stolen Generations. His government responded to the 2008 financial crisis, implementing economic stimulus packages that resulted in Australia becoming one of the only developed countries to avoid the Great Recession. Rudd's government also oversaw the establishment of the National Broadband Network (NBN), the launch of the Digital Education Revolution and Building the Education Revolution programs, dismantling WorkChoices, and withdrew Australian troops from the Iraq War.

By 2010, Rudd's leadership had faltered due to a loss of support among the Labor caucus and failure to pass key legislation like the Carbon Pollution Reduction Scheme. He resigned as prime minister in June 2010 after his deputy Julia Gillard challenged him in a leadership spill. He was replaced by Gillard as prime minister, who later appointed him as Minister for Foreign Affairs in her government. Leadership tensions between Rudd and Gillard continued, leading to Rudd resigning as Foreign Minister in February 2012 to unsuccessfully challenge her for the leadership of the party. After further leadership speculation, Rudd defeated Gillard in a final leadership ballot in June 2013, becoming prime minister for the second time. However, Labor were defeated in the 2013 election, ending his second term after only two months.

Rudd retired from parliament following the election, but he has stayed active in political discourse and academia, completing a DPhil at Jesus College, Oxford, in 2022. He has been involved in a number of international organizations, advocating for issues such as China–United States relations and Australian media diversity. He was appointed as Australia's ambassador to the U.S. by the Albanese government in March 2023, with Rudd choosing to exit the role in March 2026.

== Early life and education ==
Rudd is of English and Irish descent. His father's great-grandparents were English: Thomas Rudd and Mary Cable. Thomas had been convicted of stealing a bag of sugar, arriving in NSW on board the Earl Cornwallis in 1801. Mary had been sentenced to transportation for stealing a bolt of cloth, arriving in the colony in 1804. His mother's grandparents, Owen Cashin and Hannah Maher, who were both born in Ireland, met and married in Brisbane in 1887.

Rudd was born in Nambour, Queensland, to Albert ("Bert") and Margaret (née DeVere) Rudd, the youngest son of four children, and grew up on a dairy farm in nearby Eumundi. At an early age (5–7), he contracted rheumatic fever and spent a considerable time at home convalescing. It damaged his heart, in particular the valves, for which he has thus far had two aortic valve replacement surgeries, but this was discovered only some 12 years later. Farm life, which required the use of horses and guns, is where he developed his lifelong love of horse riding and shooting clay targets. He attended Eumundi State School.

When Rudd was 11, his father, a share farmer and Country Party member, died. Rudd states that the family was required to leave the farm amidst financial difficulty between two and three weeks after the death, though the family of the landowner states that the Rudds didn't have to leave for almost six months. Following this traumatic childhood and despite familial connections with the Country Party, Rudd joined the Australian Labor Party in 1972 at the age of 15.

Rudd boarded at Marist College Ashgrove in Brisbane, although these years were not happy due to the indignity of poverty and reliance on charity; he was known to be a "charity case" due to his father's sudden death. He has since described the school as "tough, harsh, unforgiving, institutional Catholicism of the old school". Two years later, after she retrained as a nurse, Rudd's mother moved the family to Nambour, and Rudd rebuilt his standing through study and scholastic application and was dux of Nambour State High School in 1974. In that year, he was also the state winner of the "Youth Speaks for Australia" public speaking competition sponsored by the Jaycees. His future Treasurer Wayne Swan attended the same school at the same time, although they did not know each other as Swan was three years ahead.

Rudd studied at the Australian National University in Canberra, where he resided at Burgmann College and graduated with Bachelor of Arts (Asian Studies) with First-Class Honours. He majored in Chinese language and Chinese history, and became proficient in Mandarin. His Chinese name is Lù Kèwén (simplified Chinese: 陆克文; traditional Chinese: 陸克文). Rudd completed his BA in 1978, deferring his honours component for a year during which time he took a study trip to Taiwan. He also volunteered as a research assistant with the Zadok Institute for Christianity and at a St Vincent de Paul drug rehabilitation centre.

Rudd's thesis on Chinese democracy activist Wei Jingsheng was supervised by Pierre Ryckmans, the eminent Belgian-Australian sinologist. During his studies, Rudd did housecleaning for political commentator Laurie Oakes to earn extra money. In 1980 he continued his Chinese studies at the Mandarin Training Center of National Taiwan Normal University in Taipei, Taiwan. Delivering the 2008 Gough Whitlam Lecture at the University of Sydney on The Reforming Centre of Australian Politics, Rudd praised the former Labor prime minister for implementing educational reforms, saying he was:

... a kid who lived Gough Whitlam's dream that every child should have a desk with a lamp on it where he or she could study. A kid whose mum told him after the 1972 election that it might just now be possible for the likes of him to go to university. A kid from the country of no particular means and of no political pedigree who could therefore dream that one day he could make a contribution to our national political life.

== Early diplomatic career ==
Rudd joined the Department of Foreign Affairs in 1981 as a graduate trainee. His first posting was as Third Secretary at the Australian Embassy in Stockholm from November 1981 to December 1983 where he organised an Australian film festival, represented Australia at the Stockholm Conference on Acidification of the Environment, and reported on Soviet gas pipelines and European energy security. In 1984, Rudd was appointed Second Secretary at the Australian Embassy in Beijing, and promoted to First Secretary in 1985, where he was responsible for analysing Politburo politics, economic reform, arms control and human rights under Ross Garnaut, David Irvine and Geoff Raby. He returned to Canberra in 1987 and was assigned to the Policy Planning Branch, then the Staffing Policy Section, and was selected to serve as the Office of National Assessments Liaison Officer at the Australian High Commission in London commencing in 1989 but declined.

== Entry into politics ==
In 1988, he was appointed chief of staff to the opposition leader in Queensland, Wayne Goss. He remained in that role when Goss was elected Premier in 1989, a position he held until 1992 when Goss appointed him Director-general of the Office of Cabinet. In this position, Rudd was arguably Queensland's most powerful bureaucrat. He presided over a number of reforms, including development of a national program for teaching foreign languages in schools. Rudd was influential in both promoting a policy of developing an Asian languages and cultures program which was unanimously accepted by the Council of Australian Governments (COAG) in 1992 and later chaired a high-level working group which provided the foundation of the strategy in its report, which is frequently cited as "the Rudd Report".

The Goss Government saw its majority slashed in 1995, before losing it altogether after a by-election one year later. After Goss' resignation, Rudd left the Queensland Government and was hired as a Senior China Consultant by the accounting firm KPMG Australia. While in that position, he won selection to be the Labor candidate for the seat of Griffith at the 1996 federal election. Despite being endorsed by the retiring Labor MP, Ben Humphreys, Rudd was defeated by Liberal Graeme McDougall. Rudd stood in the same seat against McDougall in the 1998 election, this time winning on the fifth count.

== Member of Parliament (1998–2007) ==
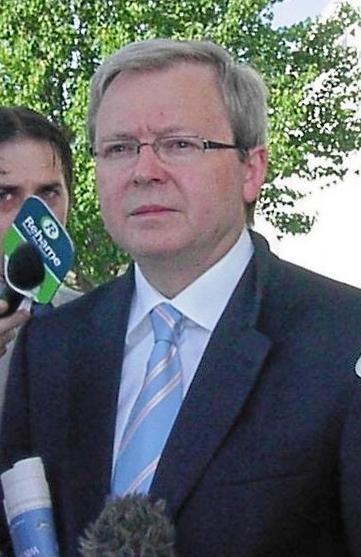
Rudd in November 2005

Rudd made his maiden speech to the House of Representatives as the new Member for the Division of Griffith on 11 November 1998. It drew heavily his personal experience of poverty to argue for the need for strong social security, public hospitals, and public housing.

=== Shadow Minister (2001–2006) ===
Following Labor's defeat in the 2001 federal election, Rudd was promoted to the Shadow Cabinet and appointed Shadow Minister for Foreign Affairs. In 2002, he met with British intelligence and helped define the position that Labor would take in regards to the 2003 invasion of Iraq.

There is no debate or dispute as to whether Saddam Hussein possesses weapons of mass destruction. He does. There's no dispute as whether he's in violation of UN Security Council resolutions. He is.

After the fall of Saddam Hussein he would criticise the Howard government over its support for the United States, while maintaining Labor's position of support for the Australian-American alliance.

Well, what Secretary Powell and the US seems to have said is that he now has grave doubts about the accuracy of the case he put to the United Nations about the claim that Iraq possessed biological weapons laboratories – the so-called mobile trailers. And here in Australia, that formed also part of the government's argument on the war. I think what it does is it adds to the fabric of how the Australian people were misled about the reasons for going to war.

Rudd's policy experience and parliamentary performances during the Iraq War made him one of the best-known Labor members. When Labor Leader Simon Crean was challenged by his predecessor Kim Beazley, Rudd did not publicly commit himself to either candidate. When Crean resigned, Rudd was considered a possible candidate for the Labor leadership, however he announced that he would not run in the leadership ballot, and would instead vote for Kim Beazley.

Rudd was predicted by some commentators to be demoted or moved as a result of his support for Beazley following the election of Mark Latham as Leader, but he retained his portfolio. Relations between Latham and Rudd deteriorated during 2004, especially after Latham made his pledge to withdraw all Australian forces from Iraq by Christmas 2004 without consulting Rudd.

When Latham suddenly resigned in January 2005, Rudd was in Indonesia and refused to say whether he would be a candidate for the Labor leadership.

=== Leader of the Opposition (2006–2007) ===
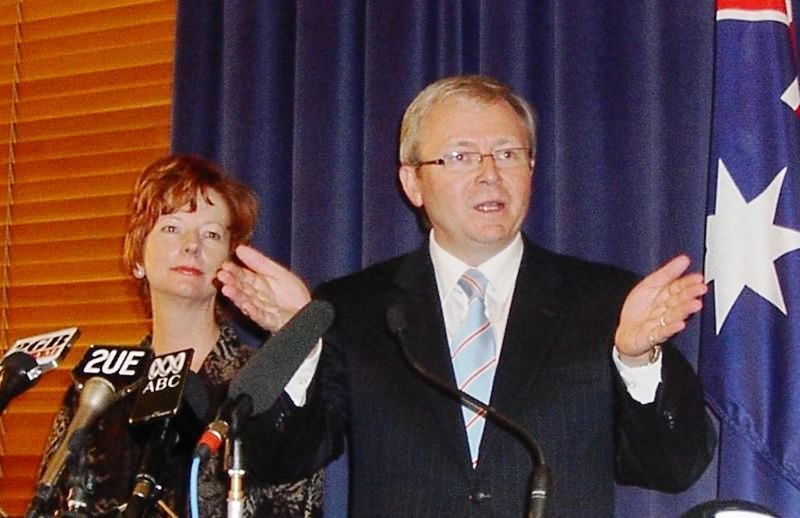
Rudd and Julia Gillard at their first press conference as Leader and Deputy Leader of the Australian Labor Party, 4 December 2006

Following opinion polls indicating that voter support for Rudd as Labor Leader was higher than for Beazley, speculation mounted that Rudd would challenge Beazley for the leadership. A poll in November 2006 indicated that support for Labor would double if Rudd was to become Leader. On 1 December 2006, Beazley called a leadership election. Rudd announced his candidacy for the leadership hours later. On 4 December, Rudd was elected Leader of the Labor Party and Leader of the Opposition with 49 votes to Beazley's 39. Julia Gillard was subsequently elected unopposed as deputy leader after Jenny Macklin resigned.

Two-party-preferred polling during the last term of the Howard government; Rudd became Labor Leader in December 2006.

At his first press conference as Labor Leader, having thanked Beazley and Macklin, Rudd said he would offer a "new style of leadership" and would be an "alternative, not just an echo" of the Howard government. He outlined the areas of industrial relations, the war in Iraq, climate change, Australian federalism, social justice and the future of Australia's manufacturing industry as major policy concerns. Rudd also stressed his long experience in state government and also as a diplomat and in business before entering federal politics.

Rudd and the Labor Party soon overtook the Howard government in both party and leadership polling. Rudd maintained a high media profile with major announcements on an "education revolution", federalism, climate change, a National Broadband Network.

In March 2007, the government raised questions over a series of meetings Rudd had had with former West Australian Labor premier Brian Burke during 2005, alleging that Rudd had been attempting to use Burke's influence to become Labor leader (after losing office, Burke had spent time in prison before returning to politics as a lobbyist). Rudd said that this had not been the purpose of the three meetings and said that they had been arranged by his colleague Graham Edwards, the Member for Cowan.

From 2002, Rudd appeared regularly in interviews and topical discussions on the popular breakfast television program Sunrise, along with Liberal MP Joe Hockey. This was credited with helping to raise Rudd's public profile even further. Rudd and Hockey ended their joint appearances in April 2007, citing the increasing political pressures of an election year.

On 19 August 2007, it was revealed that Rudd, while on a visit to New York City as Shadow Minister for Foreign Affairs, had visited a strip club in September 2003, with New York Post editor Col Allan and Labor MP Warren Snowdon. By way of explanation, Rudd said: "I had had too much to drink, I have no recollection, and nor does Mr Snowdon, of any incident occurring at the nightclub – or of being asked to leave...it is our recollection that we left within about an hour". The incident generated a lot of media coverage, but made no impact on Rudd's popularity in the polls. Some believe the incident may have enabled Rudd to appear "more human" and lifted his popularity.

==== 2007 election ====
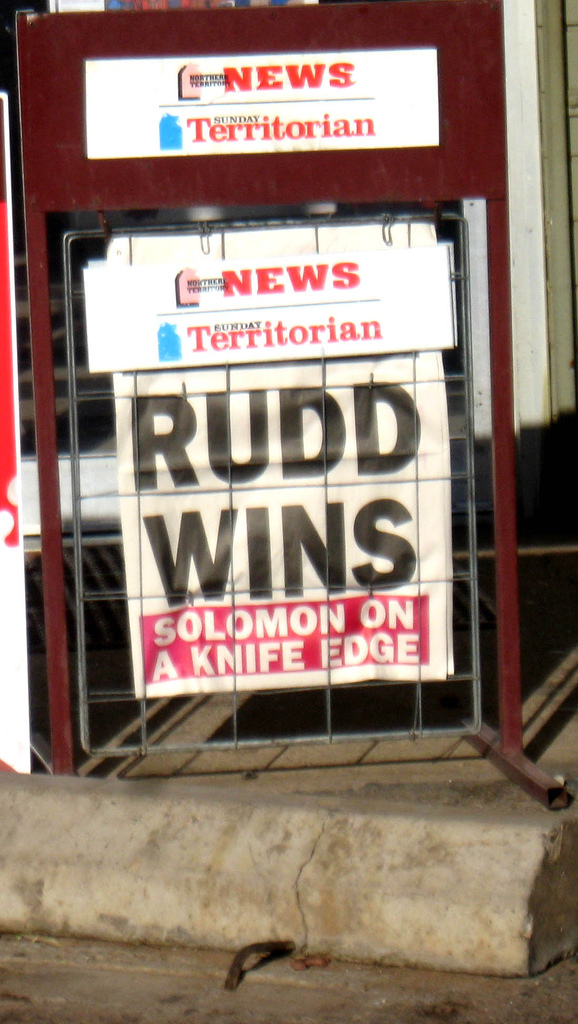
Front page of the Northern Territory News announcing Rudd's win, 25 November 2007

Electoral writs were issued for the 2007 federal election on 17 October 2007. On 21 October, Rudd faced incumbent prime minister John Howard in a television debate, where he was judged by most media analysts to have performed strongly.

On 14 November, Rudd officially launched the Labor Party's election campaign with a policy of fiscal restraint, usually considered the electoral strength of the opposing Liberal Party. Rudd proposed Labor spending measures totalling $2.3 billion, contrasting them to $9.4 billion Rudd claimed the Liberals had promised, declaring: "Today, I am saying loud and clear that this sort of reckless spending must stop."

The election was held on 24 November, and was won overwhelmingly by Labor. The result was dubbed a 'Ruddslide' by the media and was underpinned by the considerable support from Rudd's home state of Queensland, with the state result recording a two-party preferred swing of 7.53%.

As foreshadowed during the election campaign, on 29 November Rudd announced the members of his Government (see First Rudd Ministry), breaking with more than a century of Labor tradition whereby the frontbench was elected by the Labor caucus, with the leader then given the right to allocate portfolios.

== First term as Prime Minister (2007–2010) ==
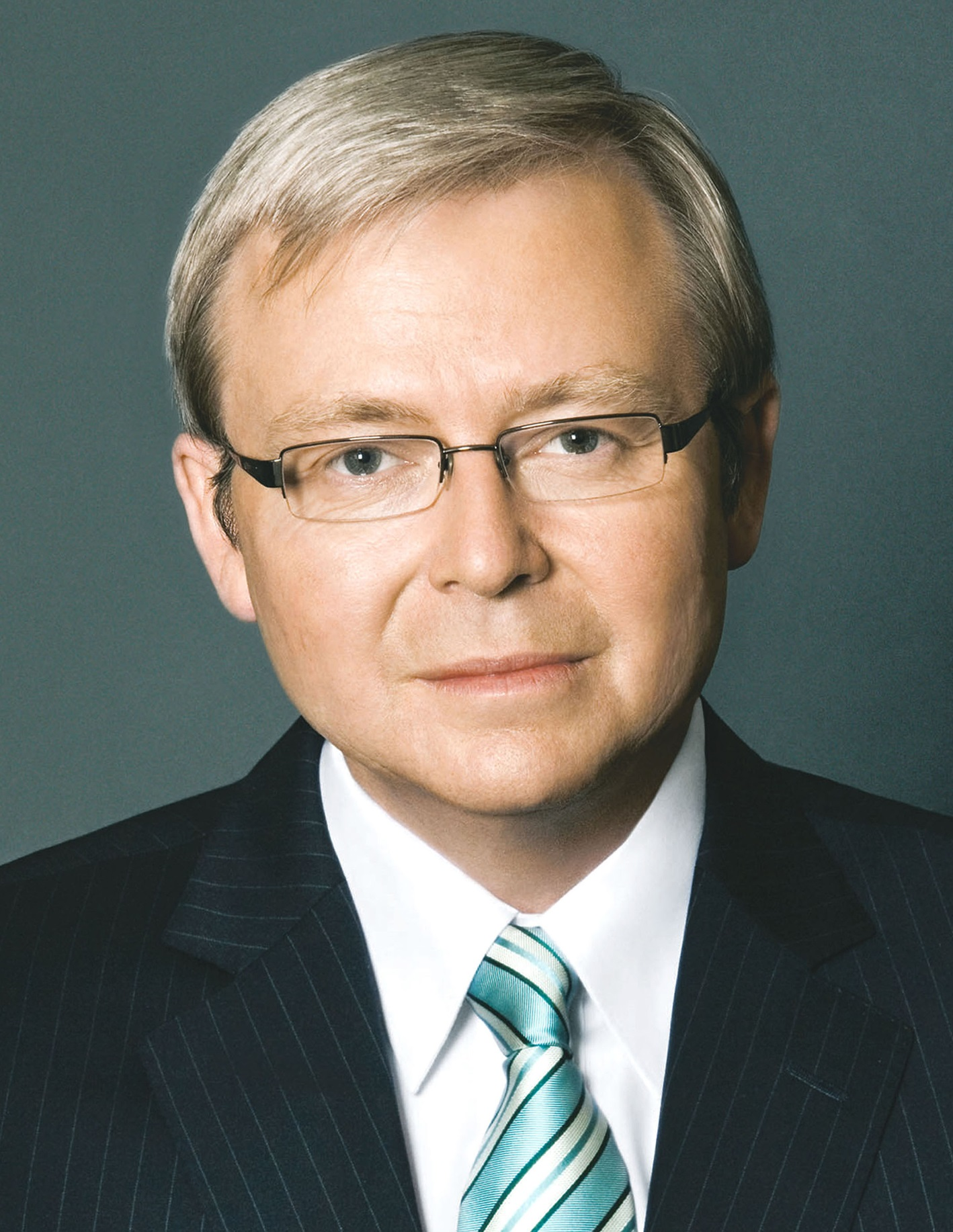
Rudd's official portrait, 2007

On 3 December 2007, Rudd was sworn in as the 26th prime minister of Australia by governor-general Michael Jeffery. Rudd was the first Labor prime minister since Paul Keating left office in 1996, and the second to make no mention of the monarch when taking his oath of office. He also became only the second Queenslander to lead his party to a federal election victory (the first being Andrew Fisher in 1910) and was the first prime minister since the Second World War not to have come from either New South Wales or Victoria.

Early initiatives of the Rudd government included the signing of the Kyoto Protocol, a Parliamentary Apology to the Stolen Generations and the 2020 Summit in April 2008. Other achievements of the Rudd government included keeping Australia out of recession during the 2008 financial crisis, commencing the rollout of the National Broadband Network, the introduction of nationwide early childhood education, the development of a national Australian Curriculum for schools, the construction of 20 cancer clinics around regional Australia, and paid parental leave. Rudd was named as one of the most influential people in the world by Time magazine in 2008.

During his first two years in office, Rudd set records for popularity in Newspoll opinion polling, maintaining very high approval ratings. By 2010, however, Rudd's approval ratings had begun to drop significantly, with controversies arising over the management of the 2008 financial crisis, the Senate refusal to pass the Carbon Pollution Reduction Scheme, policies on asylum seekers and a debate over a proposed "super profits" tax on the mining industry.

On 23 June 2010, following lengthy media speculation, Deputy Prime Minister Julia Gillard publicly asked that a leadership election be held. Rudd announced a leadership election for the following day.

=== Domestic policies ===
==== Environment ====
In opposition, Rudd made combatting climate change a key priority for the Labor Party, proposing an emissions trading scheme and setting an ambitious long term target of a cut to greenhouse gas emissions by 60% before 2050. He also released a plan before the election to require 20% of Australia's electricity to be generated from renewable power sources. Prior to the election, Paul Kelly wrote that Rudd had "enshrined climate change as the new moral passion for the Labor Party in a way that recalled Ben Chifley's invocation of the Light on the Hill".

The first official act of the Rudd government, on 3 December 2007, was to ratify the Kyoto Protocol. Rudd attended the UN Climate Change Conference in Bali, Indonesia, in December 2007 just ten days after being sworn in. In February 2008, the prime minister told Parliament that "the costs of inaction on climate change are much greater than the costs of action" and that "Australia must... seize the opportunity now to become a leader globally". In the 2008 budget, the Rudd government set out its climate agenda which included an emissions trading scheme and a number of renewable energy, energy efficiency and research, development and demonstration (RD&D) programs.

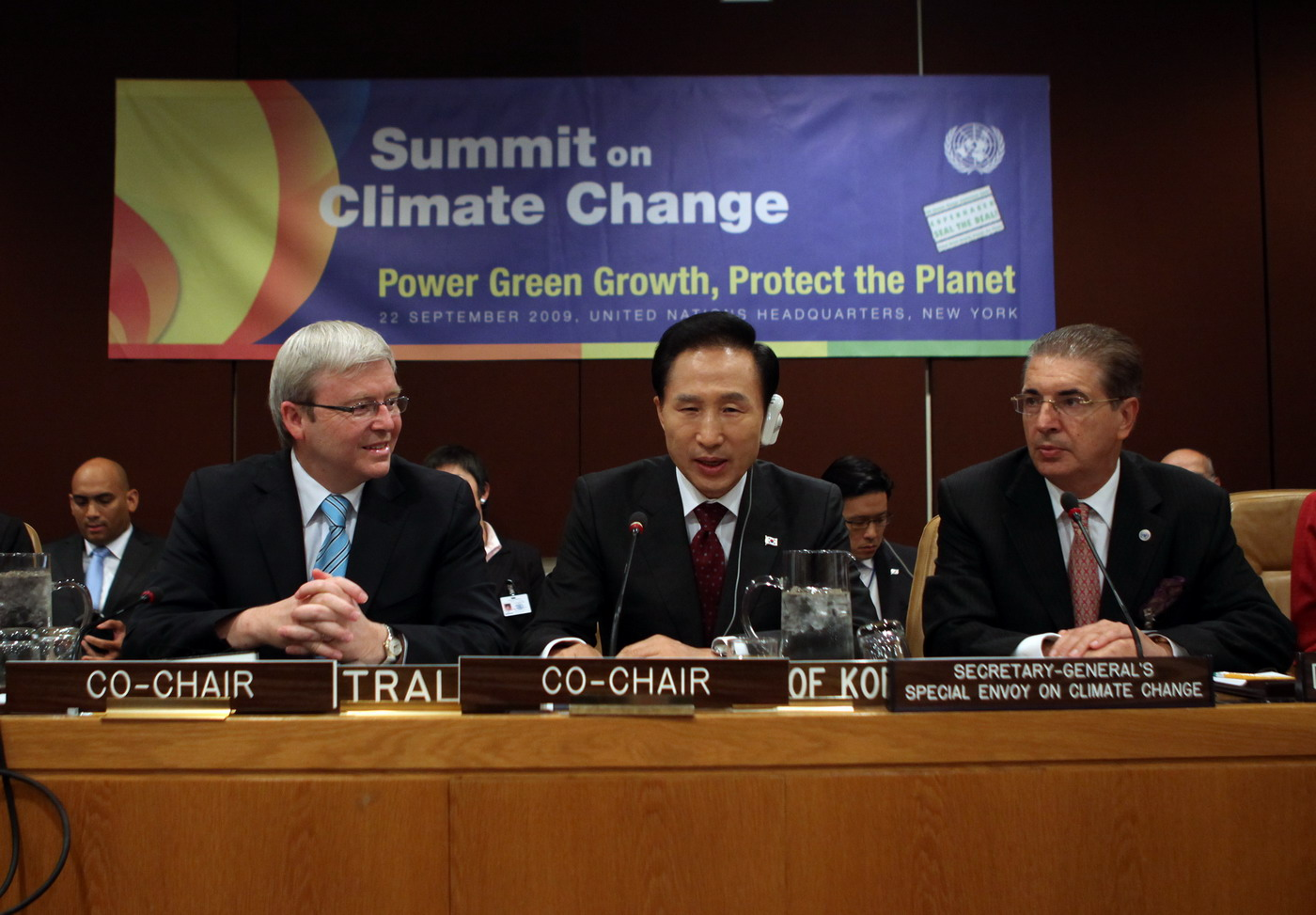
Rudd attending a United Nations summit on climate change, September 2009

Rudd established the Global Carbon Capture and Storage Institute to accelerate the deployment of carbon capture and storage (CCS) technology globally and the sharing of information. The institute was launched in a joint press conference with US president Barack Obama and Rudd at the Major Economies Forum in Italy in 2009. Obama said the partnership aimed to double the amount of investment in research and development needed to make alternative technologies viable and "points to the ability for us to pool our resources in order to see the technological breakthroughs necessary in order for us to solve this problem." The institute received international support, with 15 governments and more than 40 major companies and industry groups signing on as foundation members.

The Rudd government committed significant resources to renewable energy. Legislation for an expanded Renewable Energy Target was passed in August 2009, expanding it from 9,500 GWh by 2010 to 45,000 GWh by 2020 and introducing a 'solar credits' multiplier to provide an additional incentive for the installation of solar photovoltaic systems.

The Rudd government sought to introduce an emissions trading scheme to tackle climate change in Australia and embarked on a thorough policy development process involving the Garnaut Review led by its climate change adviser, Ross Garnaut, followed by a green paper on ETS design issues, Treasury modelling to inform mitigation target decisions and a final white paper, which would be published in December 2008. The White Paper included a plan to introduce an emissions trading scheme in 2010, known as the Carbon Pollution Reduction Scheme, and gave a target range for Australia's greenhouse gas emissions in 2020 of between 5% and 15% less than 2000 levels. However, the ultimate legislation was frustrated in the Australian Senate — with the Liberal Party, Nationals and Australian Greens voting against it, the Senate rejected it on 13 August 2009. Rudd and key Labor ministers worked with the Liberals under opposition leader Malcolm Turnbull, who personally supported action on emissions, to achieve compromise on details of the scheme and gain their support. On 1 December 2009, Turnbull was replaced in a leadership spill called over the issue, by ETS opponent Tony Abbott, and the following day, the Senate voted against the revised package of bills. Rudd criticised the Liberals heavily for their refusal to support the legislation ("What absolute political cowardice, what absolute failure of leadership, what absolute failure of logic ...") but in April 2010 announced that the Government would delay implementing an emissions trading scheme until 2011.

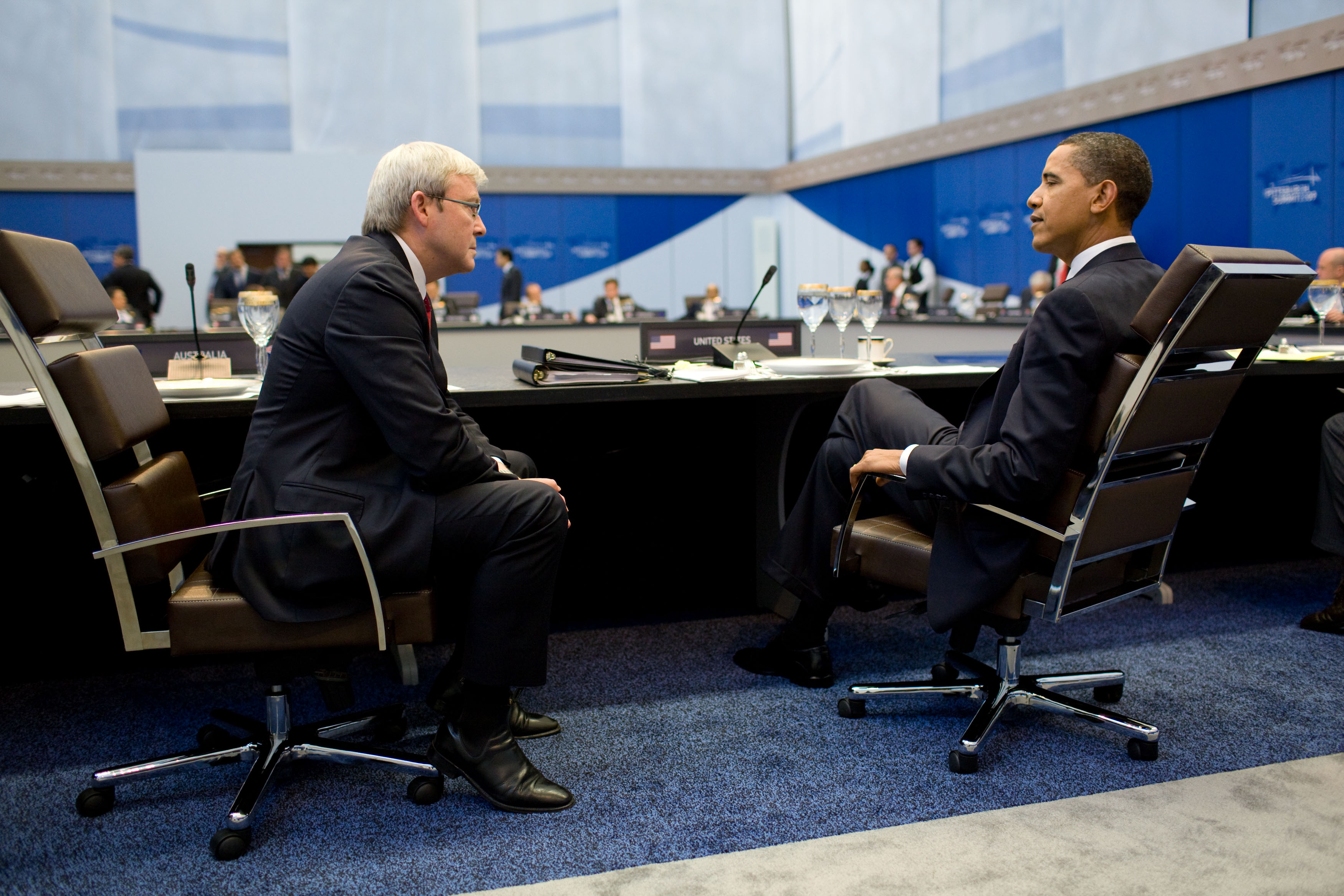
Rudd and US president Barack Obama at a G20 meeting, September 2009

Rudd personally committed himself to international action on climate change in the lead-up to the Copenhagen Summit in December 2009. Ahead of the summit, he convened a meeting of leaders at the 2009 APEC conference in Singapore which brought together the leaders of China, the United States, Japan and Denmark for the first time to discuss their respective positions. Rudd announced financial help for small island states affected by climate change at the Commonwealth Heads of Government Meeting in Trinidad and Tobago in 2009 and used the meeting to rally support for the Copenhagen summit. Rudd played a key role in Copenhagen in delivering an accord despite the wide divergence of views among advanced and emerging economies. Gordon Brown, the then-prime minister of the United Kingdom, said of Rudd at Copenhagen: "Kevin stood up to those who wanted to say 'no' on climate change ... The fact we got a Copenhagen declaration which has now led to the next stage ... is in no small measure due to him." However, the perceived weakness of the Copenhagen accord in setting binding targets impacted upon the momentum towards an emissions trading scheme at home. Rudd reflected later that "we all failed... though not for want of effort from many of us."

==== Stolen Generations ====
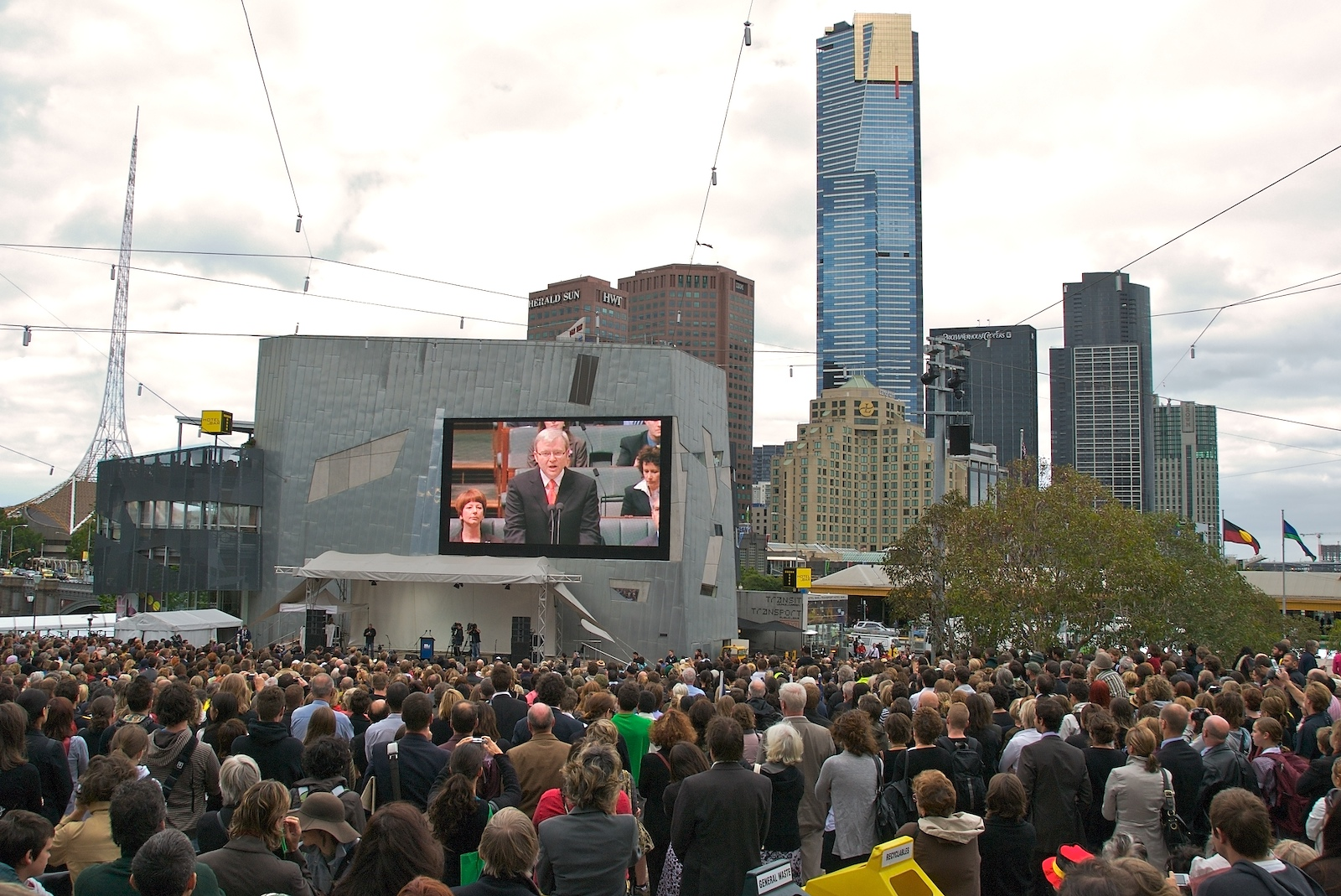
Rudd on television in Federation Square, Melbourne, apologising to the stolen generations

As the parliament's first order of business, on 13 February 2008, Rudd gave a national apology to Indigenous Australians for the stolen generations. The apology, for the policies of successive parliaments and governments, passed unanimously as a motion by both houses of parliament. Rudd pledged the government to bridging the gap between Indigenous and Non-Indigenous Australian health, education and living conditions, and in a way that respects their rights to self-determination. During meetings held in December 2007 and March 2008 the Council of Australian Governments (COAG) adopted six targets to improve the wellbeing of Indigenous Australians over the next five to twenty years. As of 2016, there have been eight Closing the Gap Reports presented to Parliament, providing data in areas that previously had none and updates on progress.

Since leaving politics, Rudd has established the Australian National Apology Foundation, as foreshadowed in his final speech to Parliament, to continue to promote reconciliation and closing the gap between Indigenous and non-Indigenous Australians. He has contributed $100,000 to the foundation and to kickstart fundraising for a National Apology Chair at the Australian National University.

==== Economy ====
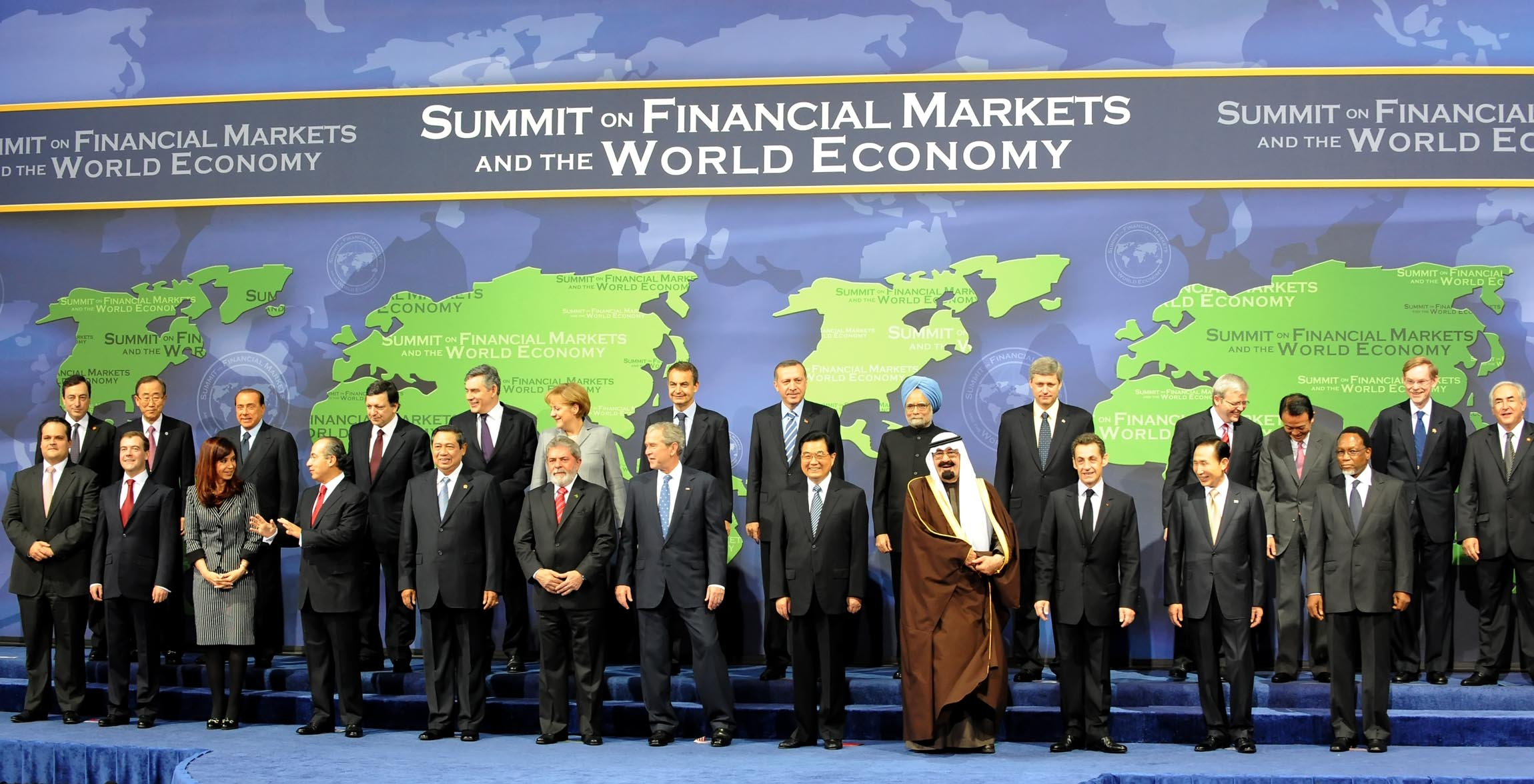
Rudd (back row, fourth from right) at the G-20 Leaders Summit on Financial Markets and the World Economy

The Rudd government's economic policy response to the 2008 financial crisis has been cited as an effective international model and described by Nobel laureate Joseph Stiglitz as "one of the strongest Keynesian stimulus packages in the world" that "helped Australia avoid recession and saved up to 200,000 jobs". Following the start of the 2008 financial crisis, increased exports and consumer spending stimulated by the Rudd government's intervention helped the Australian economy avoid recession in 2009. Australia was the only western economy to do so. Internationally, Kevin Rudd helped lead efforts to make the G20 the most influential global forum coordinating policies to counter the global impact of the crisis.

In his first speech to Parliament in 1998, Rudd outlined his belief in the need for governments to take an active role in the economy, particularly to assure equality of opportunity. He affirmed his general belief in competitive markets, but repudiated neoliberalism and free market economists such as Friedrich Hayek, saying governments must regulate markets and intervene where they fail. Upon becoming leader in December 2006, he promised an economic policy with two arms to its philosophy and practice: rewarding hard work and achievement, but with a guarantee of fairness and social justice.

On election to office prior to the 2008 financial crisis, the Rudd government announced a five-point plan to combat inflation. The first budget of the Rudd government was delivered by Treasurer Wayne Swan in May 2008 and a projected surplus of $21.7 billion was announced. In line with Rudd's explanation of his economic philosophy on taking office, his government intervened early as the global recession began to take hold by guaranteeing bank deposits and announcing two stimulatory spending packages. The first was worth $10.4 billion and announced in late 2008, and included measures such as lump sum payments for low to middle income earners, increasing the first homebuyers' bonus, doubling training places and fast-tracking a national infrastructure program. The second, worth $42 billion, was announced in February 2009 and included $900 cash payments to resident taxpayers who paid net tax in the 2007–08 financial year. Stating that his Government would "move heaven and earth to reduce the impact of the global recession", Rudd delivered a spending program for infrastructure, schools and housing worth $28.8 billion as part of this package. After initially raising interest rates to combat inflation, The Reserve Bank cut official interest rates several times in increments of up to 1 percent, and fell to 3 percent in May 2009, the lowest since 1960. The second budget, released in May 2009, projected a $57.6 billion deficit for 2009–10. The majority of the deficit was created by a loss of taxation revenue as a result of the recession, with the rest made up in stimulus and other spending. The downturn was expected to remove $210 billion in taxation revenue from the budget over the next four years.

The Nation Building Economic Stimulus Plan, as it was branded, contained a range of programs implemented through Commonwealth legislation and overseen by Commonwealth agencies, although administered by state governments and other authorities. The Building the Education Revolution (BER) program, worth $16.2 billion, sought to stimulate the nationwide economy by employing construction workers in school building developments. These included the construction of libraries, classrooms and multipurpose centres, the refurbishment and repairs of existing facilities, and science and language centres in 70 secondary schools in disadvantaged areas. A$4 billion Energy Efficient Homes Package was also launched, containing a Home Insulation Program (HIP) which provided $1,600 worth of assistance to owner-occupiers to install ceiling insulation in existing homes. The government estimated that 40% of homes were not insulated, and that this had costs in energy waste, household bills for heating and cooling, and resident health and comfort among others. Other components included social and defence housing construction, funding for local community infrastructure and road projects, and the $950 cash bonus. The OECD assessed in its 2009 Economic Outlook Report that the Rudd government's policy response to the crisis had reduced the impact of the global recession on employment.

Two major controversies, however, affected public reception of the scheme. The Home Insulation Program became controversial in early 2010 after reports of house fires, possible fraud and the deaths of four young insulation installers. Rudd responded by demoting the minister responsible, Peter Garrett, suspending the scheme and commissioning an immediate review of the program by Dr Allan Hawke. Hawke noted in his report that "despite the safety, quality and compliance concerns, there were solid achievements against the program objectives". Approximately 1.1 million homes had been insulated through the scheme by April 2010, about 10,000 jobs had been created, and national safety standards and training were a focus. However, Hawke found the department was not up to the task of monitoring thousands of independent contractors around Australia on a tight timeframe and that demand was higher than anticipated, which led to safety and quality risks that "cannot be fully abated". Greg Combet, who had been appointed Minister for Climate Change and Energy Efficiency, announced upon the report's release on 22 April that the scheme would not resume, and that he would work to restore public confidence in the home insulation industry. Rudd personally apologised to the families on 26 April. In a 2014 Royal Commission investigation into the scheme, Rudd accepted his Government's responsibility for systems failures that led to the deaths, describing them as a "deep tragedy" and acknowledged the pain of the families involved.

The Building the Education Revolution program rolled out 23,670 school projects around Australia representing a completion rate of 92 per cent. However, claims of overpricing and poor value for money in some projects resulted in a taskforce being established to examine the implementation of the scheme, led by Brad Orgill, the former CEO of UBS Australasia. Only 3% of complaints about the scheme were upheld, and most projects were found to have been good value for money.

In early 2009, during the Great Recession, Rudd stated "that the great neo-liberal experiment of the past 30 years has failed", and that "Neo-liberalism and the free-market fundamentalism it has produced has been revealed as little more than personal greed dressed up as an economic philosophy. And, ironically, it now falls to social democracy to prevent liberal capitalism from cannibalising itself." Rudd called for a new era of "social capitalism" from social democrats such as himself and US president Barack Obama to "support a global financial system that properly balances private incentive with public responsibility". The Center for Strategic and International Studies has acknowledged Kevin Rudd as one of the founders of the G20 that helped prevent a second global depression.

The Rudd government's third budget in 2010 projected a $40.8 billion deficit for 2010–11 but forecast that Australia would return to surplus by 2012–13. The government proposed a "super profits" tax on the mining industry and included $12 billion in revenue from the proposal in the forecast, although the tax had not been passed by the Senate.

==== Australia 2020 Summit ====
In February 2008 Rudd announced the Australia 2020 Summit, held from 19 to 20 April 2008, which brought together 1000 leading Australians to discuss ten major areas of policy innovation. Among the initiatives supported at the event, the summit voted in favour of a plebiscite on Australia "relinquishing ties" to the United Kingdom followed by a referendum on the model for an Australian republic, a bill of rights, the re-formation of an Indigenous peak representative body similar to ATSIC, (which had been abolished by the Howard government), the introduction of an Emissions Trading Scheme and a National Disability Insurance Scheme, and a review of the taxation system.

Findings released in April 2009 reported that nine out of the 1000 submitted ideas were to be immediately enacted and that the government was deliberating on other ideas proposed. By mid-2010, among the key reform ideas suggested, Prime Minister Rudd had sought to introduce an ETS, but postponed it after failing to secure passage through the senate; formed a consultative committee on a Bill of rights then rejected its recommendation for implementation; established the National Congress of Australia's First Peoples in 2010; commissioned the Henry Review of taxation (on the basis of which the Rudd government proposed a new "super-profits" tax on mining); and Rudd had described the issue of a vote on a republic as not being "a priority".

==== Industrial relations ====
Kevin Rudd came to office pledging to overhaul WorkChoices, a key Howard government policy commencing in March 2006 which had been attacked for reducing pay and conditions in the workplace, and which was crucial to Howard's defeat at the 2007 federal election.

Upon Rudd's arrival as Leader of the Opposition in December 2006, he gave a speech emphasising this commitment. In April 2007, he announced Labor's "Forward with Fairness" plan to take to the election, which included a phased abolition of Australian Workplace Agreements (AWAs) over five years, a safety net consisting of 10 National Employment Standards, an independent umpire and simplified industrial awards. It also included the restoration of unfair dismissal laws for companies with under 100 employees (probation period of 12 months for companies with less than 15 employees), and the retention of the Australian Building and Construction Commission until 2010. It retained the illegality of secondary boycotts, the right of employers to lock workers out, restriction of a union right of entry to workplaces, and restrictions on workers' right to strike. It was broadly seen as a concession to business on some areas of concern while still upholding key elements of the original plan.

On 20 March 2008, the Workplace Relations Amendment (Transition to Forward with Fairness) Act 2008 gained assent, and gave effect to some of these measures, including preventing any new AWAs from being signed. Rudd declared AWA's "dead and buried", saying: "Today we declare this shameful chapter in the history of Australia's workplaces to be dead and buried. And today with this legislation we begin the process of burying the rest of the Work Choices omnibus once and for all."

In 2009, the Fair Work Act was passed. Rudd also established a single industrial relations bureaucracy called Fair Work Australia, designed to play a far more interventionist role than the Howard government's Fair Pay Commission.

==== Education ====
During the election, Rudd promised a "Digital Education Revolution", including provision of a computer on the desk of every upper secondary student. The program initially stalled with state governments asserting that the proposed funding was inadequate. The federal government increased proposed funding from $1.2 billion to $2 billion, and did not mandate that a computer be provided to each upper secondary student. The program supplied office software, photo and video editing software, and web design software, some of it unusable due to the hardware becoming obsolete.

==== Immigration ====
As prime minister, Rudd professed his belief in a "Big Australia", while his government increased the immigration quota after to around 300,000 people. In 2010, Rudd appointed Tony Burke as population minister to examine population goals.

In 2008, the government adjusted the mandatory detention policies established by the Keating and Howard governments and declared an end to the Pacific Solution. Boat arrivals increased considerably during 2009 and the Opposition said this was due to the government's policy adjustments, the Government said it was due to "push factors". After a fatal explosion on an asylum seeker boat in April 2009, Rudd said: "People smugglers are the vilest form of human life." Opposition frontbencher Tony Abbott said that Kevin Rudd was inept and hypocritical in his handling of the issue during the Oceanic Viking affair of October 2009. In April 2010, the Rudd government suspended processing new claims by Sri Lankan and Afghan asylum seekers, who comprised 80 per cent of all boat arrivals, for three and six months respectively.

==== Taxation ====
In the 2007 election, Rudd committed to increase the fairness of the tax system. The 2008 Budget aimed to achieve this with a range of measures including $47 billion of tax cuts over four years focused on lower and middle income workers, an increase of the child care tax rebate from 30% to 50%, an increase of the income level at which the Medicare Levy Surcharge was targeted, and introducing means tests for some other benefits. Some other measures were blocked or amended in the Senate, in which any crossbencher in combination with the Liberal-National Coalition could defeat a bill.

In May 2008, Rudd committed to a "root and branch" review of all aspects of the Australian taxation system, led by the secretary of the Treasury, Ken Henry, and taking evidence from a wide range of sources. After receiving around 1,500 submissions and running a two-day conference, the Henry Tax Review reported to the Treasurer in December 2009. On 2 May 2010, the Rudd government formally responded, announcing a package of measures to help support investment in the non-mining sectors and rebalance the economy to a more sustainable trajectory.

The government's tax plan had three components: reducing the corporate tax rate to 28% and introducing investment incentives for small business; increasing the compulsory employee superannuation rate to 12% to increase the savings base; and eliminating state-based mining royalties, establishing a $5.6 billion infrastructure fund to support resources sector expansion and competitiveness, and increasing tax rebates for mining exploration. These three components were to be funded by a new Resources Super Profits Tax (RSPT) on the 'super profits' of mining companies. The RSPT was a profits-based tax, which meant that when resource companies made large profits their effective tax rate increased and when those profits fell, their tax rate fell. The tax policy was the subject of strong opposition from the mining industry, including an advertising campaign.

Immediately following Kevin Rudd's replacement as prime minister by Julia Gillard, the Government did a deal with the largest mining companies to replace the RSPT with a new tax – the Minerals Resource Rent Tax (MRRT). The Government claimed the new tax would raise $10.6 billion in its first two years, just $1.5 billion less than the $12 billion that RSPT had been forecast to raise. It was quickly realised that this was a wildly optimistic estimate. John Quiggin said, "All the changes that were made to the package between the original tax and the agreement they reached in the end were too generous." Prior to the introduction of the MRRT in the May 2012 budget, the government revised down its forecasts, suggesting that the tax would only bring in $3 billion for the financial year. In October 2012, the figure was reduced to $2 billion, while on 14 May 2013, it was announced that the receipts were expected to be less than $200 million.

==== Healthcare ====
Rudd announced a significant and far-reaching strategic reform to Australian healthcare in 2010. However, this was not pursued beyond in-principle agreements with Labor State and Territory governments, and was scrapped by Julia Gillard during her first year in office.

==== Families ====
The Rudd government increased the age pension by more than $100 a fortnight for singles and $76 for couples, the largest increase since 1909, in response to the Harmer Review which found that single retirees living on their own were unusually disadvantaged. It also lifted the Child Care Tax Rebate from 30 to 50 per cent for around 600,000 families – paid quarterly rather than annually. In addition, the Government introduced an Education Tax Refund of 50 per cent of up to $750 per child, benefiting 1.3 million families. Prime Minister Rudd was also responsible for Australia's first paid parental leave scheme – benefiting 150,000 new parents 18 weeks of paid leave each year.

==== Disabilities ====
Work began under Rudd on the National Disability Insurance Scheme. First floated as a big idea by advocates at the 2020 Summit in April 2008, the Rudd government doubled funding for disability services to the States and introduced the National Disability Strategy. The PM referred the idea of an insurance scheme to the Productivity Commission in 2009, announced at the National Disability Awards in Canberra.

=== Foreign affairs ===
As prime minister, Rudd saw Australia as being able to help shape world responses to urgent global challenges through active diplomacy, including the creation of global and regional institutions and building of coalitions, and playing an important role in the "Asia Pacific century".

Rudd's first official overseas visit as prime minister was to Indonesia in December 2007 for the UN Framework Convention on Climate Change, then visited Australian troops serving in Iraq and Afghanistan. In February 2008, he visited East Timor following the assassination attempt on the president of East Timor, Dr José Ramos-Horta, and in March 2008 travelled to Papua New Guinea and the Solomon Islands. The prime minister of the Solomon Islands, Dr Derek Sikua, was also the first foreign head of government Mr Rudd received as prime minister. In April 2008, Rudd signed Australia to the global Millennium Development Goals Call to Action.

==== Pacific Islands ====
A close, co-operative relationship was developed with the Pacific Island nations, leading to Australia hosting the Pacific Islands Forum in 2009, and the application of a Millennium Development Goals framework to Australian aid programs with development partners across the Pacific. The revised aid program set out concrete goals in areas such as health, education and employment for Australia's 15 development partners in the region. In August 2008, at the Pacific Islands Forum in Niue, Mr Rudd also announced the introduction of a three-year pilot seasonal worker scheme for up to 2,500 workers from Papua New Guinea, Vanuatu, Tonga and Kiribati to work in Australia's horticulture industry for up to seven months. This acceptance of guest workers was a radical departure from previous Australian policy. The seasonal worker scheme got off to slow start, bringing in 1,100 workers to 2012. However, it accelerated over the ensuing years as demand for labour increased.

==== Iraq ====
In his 2007 election campaign, Kevin Rudd committed to withdrawing Australian military forces from Iraq. He dismissed each of the reasons which had been used to commit Australian troops to the Iraq War in 2003, and accused his predecessor of abusing pre-war intelligence, some of which indicated that an attack on Iraq would increase the threat of terrorism.

In accordance with a Multinational Force Iraq agreement with the new Iraqi Government, Labor's plan to withdraw the Australian Defence Force combat contingent was completed on 28 July 2009, three days ahead of the deadline. In mid-2010, there were about 65 ADF personnel remaining in Iraq supporting UN operations or the Australian Embassy.

In March 2009, Nouri Al-Maliki, the then-Prime Minister of Iraq, visited Australia. During the visit, Prime Minister Al-Maliki and then Prime Minister Kevin Rudd signed a declaration on increased cooperation in six key areas and to enhance trade and investment ties. The leaders agreed to an Australia-Iraq Agricultural Partnership focused on bolstering Iraq's agricultural productivity and food security as a central element of Iraq's reconstruction and development. Australia also appointed a Senior Trade Commissioner to contribute to stronger commercial links, and committed to an AusAID presence in Baghdad to support the Government's three-year A$165 million development assistance commitment.

==== Afghanistan ====
The Rudd government redefined Australia's role in Afghanistan, including Australia's particular responsibility for Uruzgan Province. In Afghanistan, the Australian presence not only trained the 4th Brigade of the Afghan National Army, but also undertook large scale programs in the education of women and girls, the building of mosques with schools attached, basic healthcare and the extension of the road network. From a total of $56 million spent on foreign aid in 2009–2010, $25 million went to Afghanistan through the Afghanistan Reconstruction Trust Fund.

Rudd continued to support Australian military involvement in Afghanistan, despite the growing number of Australian casualties. On 29 April 2009, Rudd committed 450 extra troops to the region bringing the total to 1550. Explaining the deployment, he said, "A measured increase in Australian forces in Afghanistan will enhance the security of Australian citizens, given that so many terrorists attacking Australians in the past have been trained in Afghanistan."

On a November 2009 visit to Afghanistan, Rudd told Australian troops: "We from Australia will remain for the long haul." In April 2010, the Australian Government decided not to commit further troops to Uruzgan Province to replace Dutch forces when they withdrew, but increased the numbers of diplomatic, development aid, and police personnel to around 50 with military effort and civilian work focussed on Uruzgan.

=== Political positions ===
==== Nationhood ====
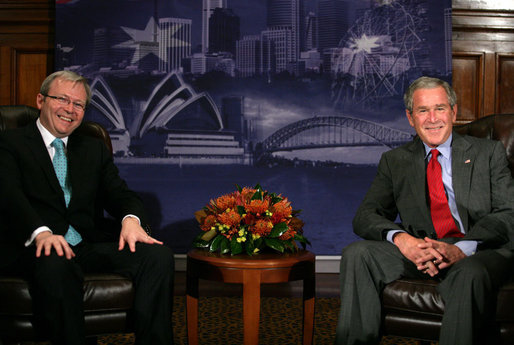
Rudd and US president George W. Bush meet at APEC Australia 2007 in Sydney.

As shadow foreign minister, Rudd reformulated Labor's foreign policy in terms of "Three Pillars": engagement with the UN, engagement with Asia, and the US alliance.

Although disagreeing with the original commitment to the Iraq War, Rudd supports the continued deployment of Australian troops in Iraq, but not the continued deployment of combat troops. Rudd was also in favour of Australia's military presence in Afghanistan.

Rudd backs the road map for peace plan and defended Israel's actions during the 2006 Israel-Lebanon conflict, condemning Hezbollah and Hamas for violating Israeli territory.

As prime minister, he also pledged support for East Timor, stating that Australian troops would remain in East Timor for as long as East Timor's government wanted them to.

Rudd also gave his support for the independence of Kosovo from Serbia, before Australia officially recognised the republic. This decision sparked protests of the Serbian Australian community against Rudd.

==== Society ====
Some commentators have described Rudd as a social conservative. He has moved to remove financial discrimination against LGBT couples, but he had previously been opposed to legislation to recognise same-sex marriage.

In May 2013, however, Rudd announced he had changed his position based on personal experience and the fact that his children had long thought him "an unreconstructed dinosaur" for not supporting marriage equality legislation. He went on to say that "I believe the secular Australian state should be able to recognise same sex marriage" while opposing any compulsion for churches to marry same-sex couples if that was not their wish.

In a conscience vote in 2006, Rudd supported legislation to transfer regulatory authority for the abortion-inducing drug RU486 from the federal Minister For Health to the Therapeutic Goods Administration, removing the minister's veto on the use of RU486 in Australia. Rudd said that "For me and for the reasons I have outlined, the life of the unborn is of great importance. And having tested these reasons with men and women of faith, and men and women of science, that I've decided not to oppose this bill. "

In another 2006 conscience vote, Rudd voted against legislation to expand embryonic stem cell research

In May 2008, Rudd was drawn into the controversy over photographic artist Bill Henson and his work depicting naked adolescents as part of a show due to open at an inner-city gallery in Sydney. In a televised interview, Rudd stated that he found the images "absolutely revolting" and that they had "no artistic merit". These views swiftly drew censure from members of the "creative stream" who attended the 2020 Summit convened by Rudd, led by actress Cate Blanchett.

=== Resignation ===
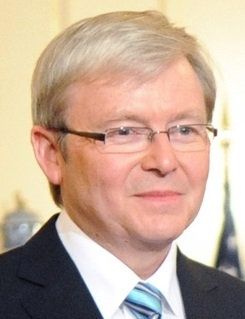
Rudd in 2010

On 23 June 2010, the Sydney Morning Herald reported that Rudd's chief of staff, Alister Jordan, had talked to over half of the Labor caucus to gauge the level of Rudd's support within the party. This followed significant media speculation that his deputy, Julia Gillard, would challenge him for the leadership. Late that evening, after it became clear that Rudd had lost the support of a large number of Labor MPs, Gillard publicly requested that Rudd hold a leadership election as soon as possible. Rudd subsequently announced a leadership election for 24 June, saying that he would stand. Hours before the vote, however, it became clear that Rudd would not have the support to win, and so he stood down as Labor leader and prime minister.

Gillard was elected unopposed, becoming Australia's first female prime minister. Bill Shorten, the Parliamentary Secretary for Disabilities and Children's Services and a key member of the Labor Party's right faction, speculated that it was the Government's handling of the insulation program, the sudden announcement of change of policy on the Carbon Pollution Reduction Scheme, and the way in which they had "introduced the debate" about the Resource Super Profits Tax as the main reasons which had led to a collapse in support for Rudd's leadership.

Barry Cohen, a former minister in the Hawke government, said that many in the Labor Party felt ignored by Rudd's centralist leadership style, and his at times insulting and rude treatment of staff and other ministers. Many were willing to overlook this due to his immense popularity, but when Rudd's poll numbers began to drop in late 2009 and 2010, they wanted to install a leader more able to establish consensus and involve the party caucus as a whole. Rudd became the first Australian prime minister to be removed from office by his own party during his first term.

=== Popularity and assessment ===
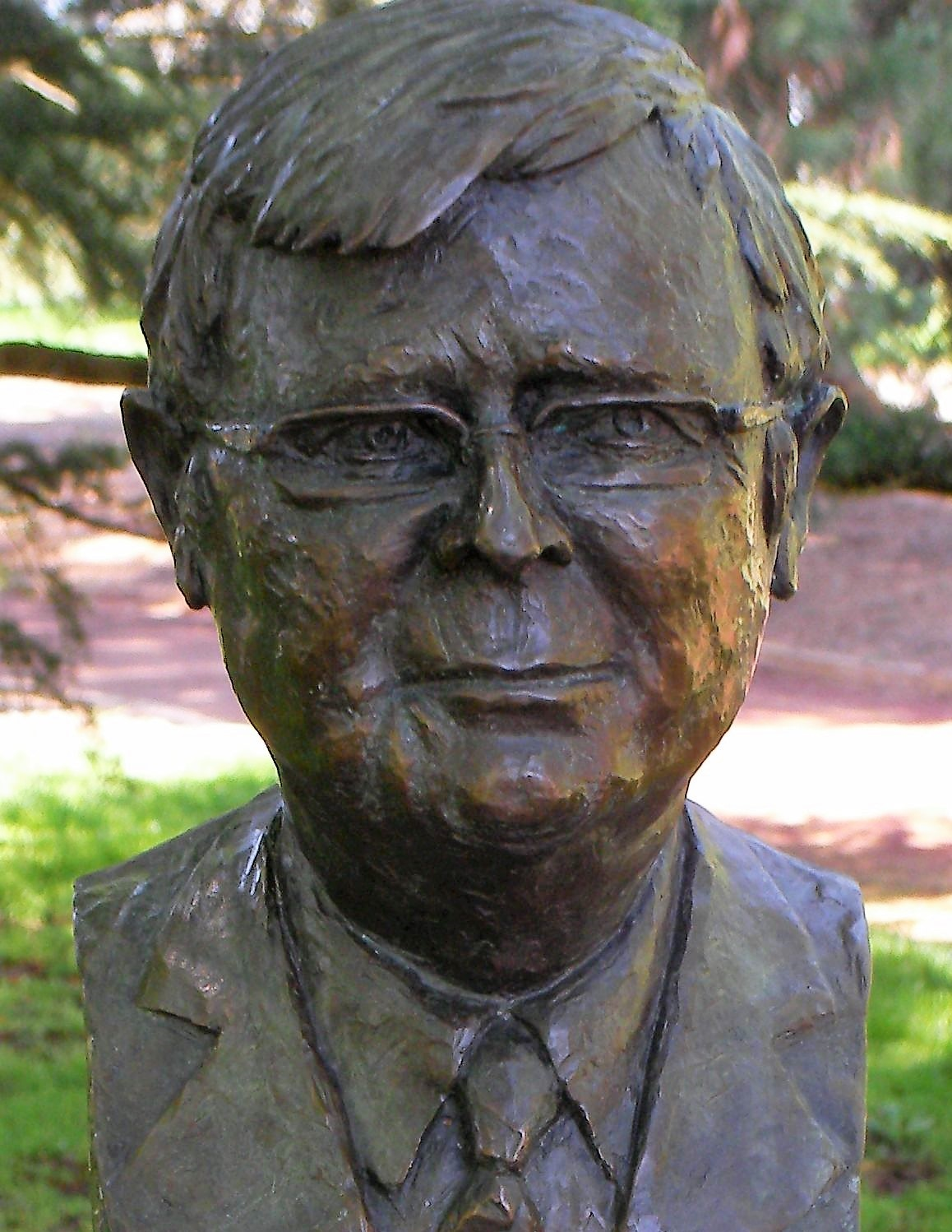
Bronze bust at the Prime Minister's Avenue in the Ballarat Botanical Gardens

Rudd maintained long periods of popularity in opinion polls during his initial tenure as prime minister for his management of the 2008 financial crisis and his well renowned apology to the Indigenous community, achieving some of the highest approval ratings for an Australian prime minister on record during the height of the 2008 financial crisis. However, he would see a rapid decrease in popularity after his failed handling of legislative negotiations, ultimately leading to the demise of his premiership. The circumstances of his removal from office have remained controversial; his supporters have decried the undemocratic nature of his ousting, while critics have accused him of an autocratic and flawed leadership style. He is often ranked in the middle-to-lower tier of Australian prime ministers.

== 2010 election ==
Rudd announced following his resignation as prime minister that he would re-contest his seat of Griffith for the 2010 federal election, set for 21 August. Early in the campaign, he suffered abdominal pain and underwent surgery to remove his gall bladder. His first public statements after the operation were in an interview with ABC Radio National's Phillip Adams for Late Night Live, which received wide national coverage; in it, he denied being the source of political leaks concerning Julia Gillard. Gillard later requested that Rudd join the national campaign to boost Labor's chances of re-election, which he did. Rudd and Gillard were subsequently photographed together during a private meeting in Brisbane, both appearing uncomfortable, unsmiling and unspeaking. Rudd was comfortably re-elected as the Member for Griffith. The election resulted in a hung parliament after both major parties failed to win a majority of seats. Weeks later, Gillard was able to form a minority government with the support of the Greens and independent MPs.

== Foreign minister (2010–2012) ==
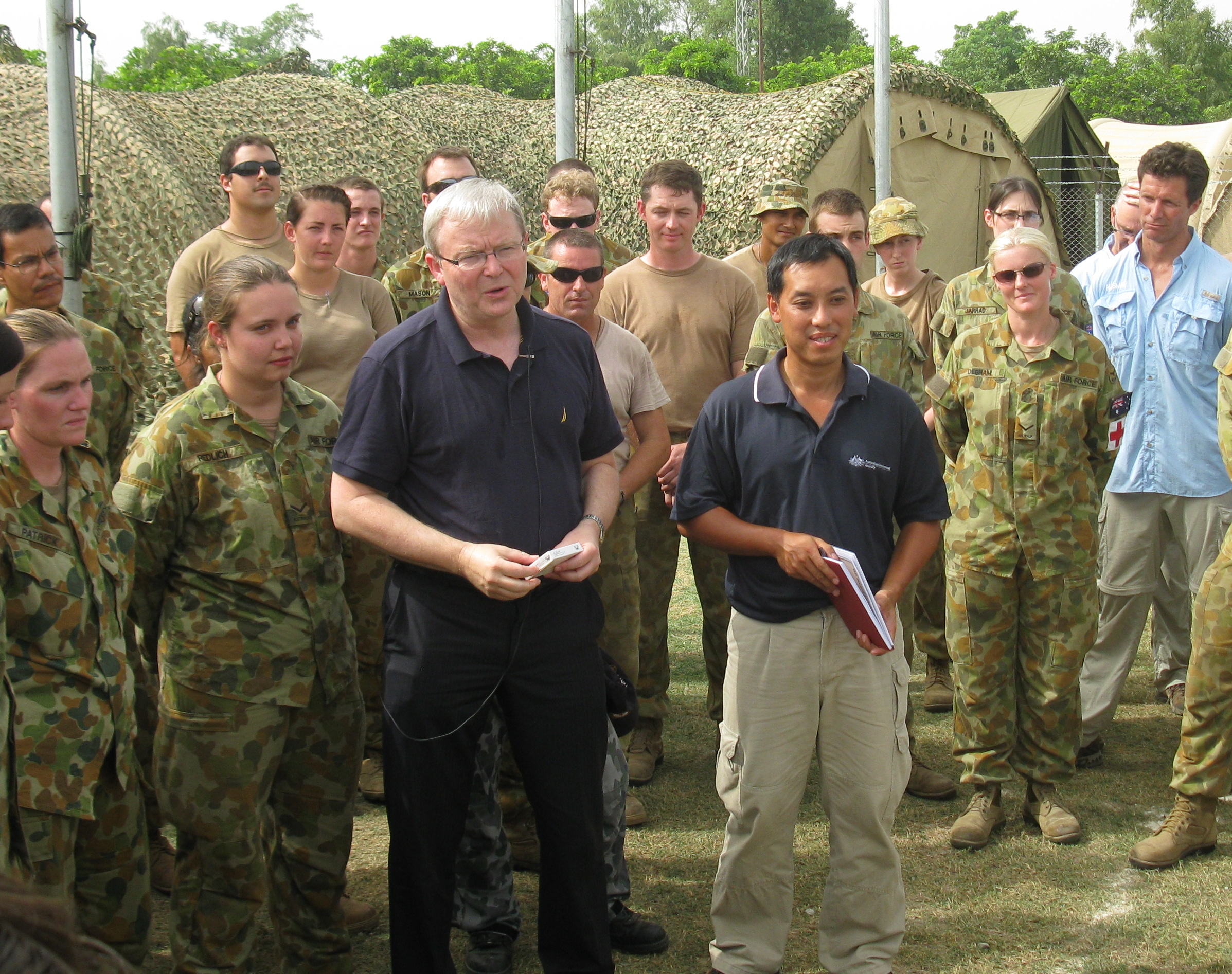
Rudd with the Australian Defence Force in Pakistan, August 2010

Prime Minister Julia Gillard appointed Rudd as Minister for Foreign Affairs in Cabinet on 14 September 2010. He represented Gillard at a UN General Assembly meeting in September 2010.

WikiLeaks, in 2010, published material about Kevin Rudd's term as prime minister, included United States diplomatic cables leak. As foreign minister, Rudd denounced publishing classified documents by WikiLeaks. The Australian media reported that references to Rudd in the cables included frank discussions between Rudd and US officials about China and Afghanistan. This included negative assessments of some of Rudd's foreign policy initiatives and leadership style, written in confidence for the US Government by the US Embassy staff in Australia.

Before his first visit to Israel as foreign minister, Rudd stated Israel should be subject to International Atomic Energy Agency inspection. Israeli foreign minister Avigdor Lieberman rejected the call.

Following the 2011 Egyptian revolution and resignation of Egyptian president Hosni Mubarak, Rudd called for "constitutional reform and a clear timetable towards free and fair elections".

In response to the 2011 Libyan civil war, Rudd announced in early March 2011, the international community should enforce a no-fly zone, as the "lesser of two evils". The US officials in Canberra sought clarification on what the Australian Government was proposing. Gillard said the United Nations Security Council should consider a full range of alternatives, and that Australia was not planning to send forces to enforce a no-fly zone.

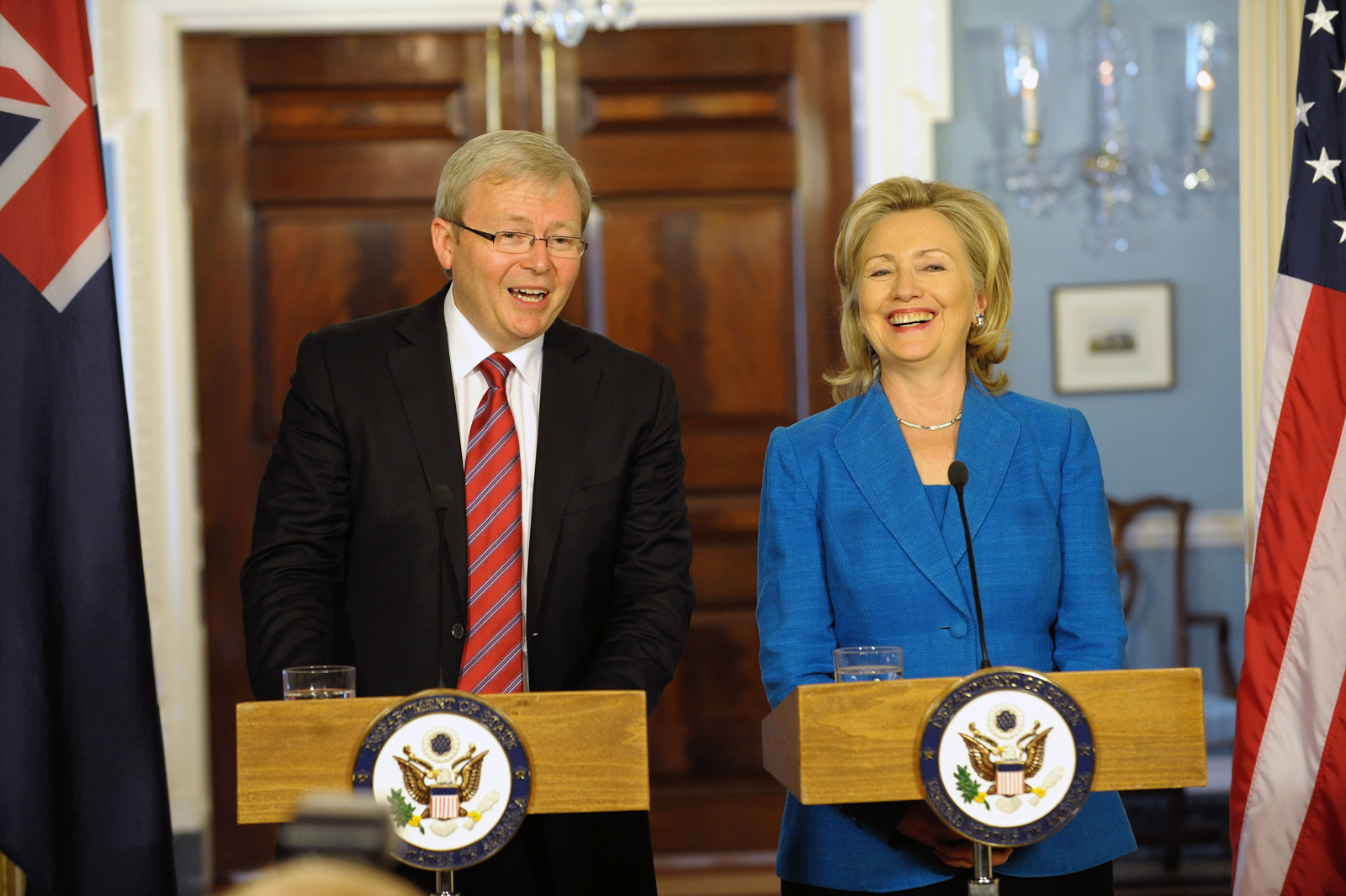
Rudd with United States Secretary of State Hillary Clinton in September 2010

Following the devastating 2011 Tōhoku earthquake and tsunami in Japan, Rudd announced after talking with Japanese foreign minister Takeaki Matsumoto, he had offered Australian field hospitals and disaster victim identification teams to help with recovery. Rudd also said he had offered Australian atomic expertise and sought urgent briefings following an explosion at a nuclear plant. Rudd announced his resignation as foreign minister on 22 February 2012, citing Gillard's failure to counter character attacks launched by Simon Crean and "other faceless men" as his reasons. Speaking to the press, Rudd explained that he considered Gillard's silence as evidence that she no longer supported him, and therefore he could not continue in office. "I can only serve as Foreign Minister if I have the confidence of Prime Minister Gillard and her senior ministers," he said.

Rudd resigned as the Minister for Foreign Affairs followed heated speculation about a possible leadership spill. Craig Emerson temporarily replaced Rudd as Minister for Foreign Affairs, until Senator Bob Carr became Minister for Foreign Affairs on 13 March 2012.

== Leadership tensions ==
=== February 2012 spill ===
Speculation regarding Rudd's desire to challenge Gillard to regain the leadership of the Labor Party—and hence the prime ministership—became a near constant feature of media commentary on the Gillard government. In October 2011, Queensland MP Graham Perrett, the member for the marginal Brisbane-area seat of Moreton, announced that if Labor replaced Gillard with Rudd, he would resign and force a by-election. In her speech to Labor's 2011 Conference, Prime Minister Gillard mentioned every Labor prime minister since World War II with the exception of Kevin Rudd. The speech was widely reported as a snub to Rudd. In early 2012, Labor MPs began to openly discuss the issue of leadership. Simon Crean told Radio 3AW, "[Rudd] can't be leader again...people will not elect as leaders those they don't perceive as team players".

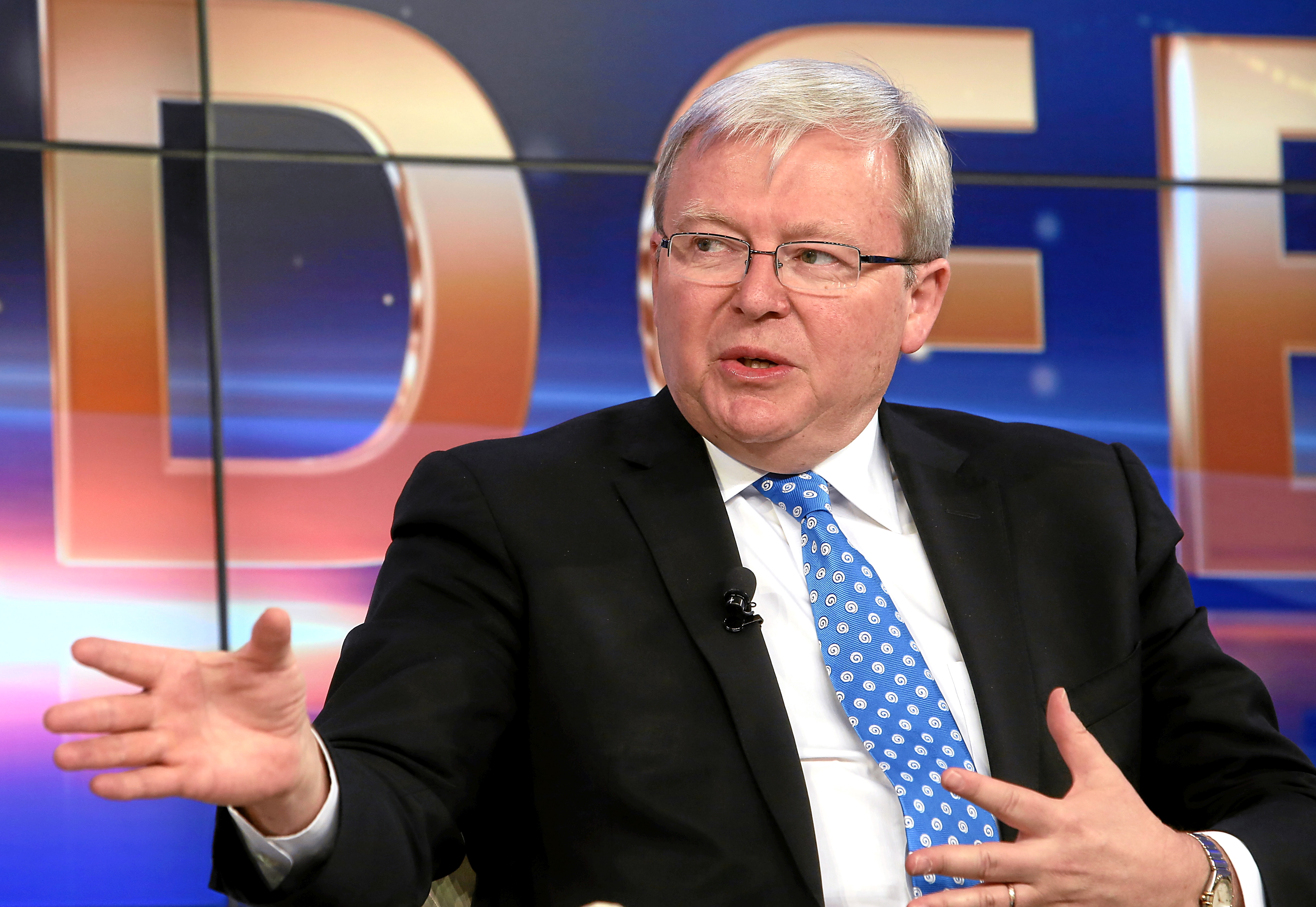
Rudd at the 2013 meeting of the World Economic Forum

Following a Four Corners program that revisited Gillard's role in Rudd's downfall as prime minister, a breakdown in party discipline saw Labor MP Darren Cheeseman call on Gillard to resign, while his colleague Steve Gibbons called Rudd a "psychopath with a giant ego". Amidst the controversy, an expletive-laden video of out-takes of an intemperate Kevin Rudd attempting to record a Chinese language message during his time as prime minister was released anonymously on YouTube, apparently aimed at discrediting his push for the leadership. While Rudd said publicly only that he was "happy as Foreign Minister", media commentators widely declared that a leadership challenge was "on".

When Rudd resigned on 22 February 2012, Deputy Prime Minister Wayne Swan lambasted Rudd as "dysfunctional". His Cabinet colleague Tony Burke also spoke against Rudd, saying of his time in office that "the stories that were around of the chaos, of the temperament, of the inability to have decisions made, they are not stories.". Labor Senator Doug Cameron came out in support of Rudd and called on his colleagues to show him respect.

Later that day, Rudd said that he did not think Gillard could defeat the Coalition at the next election and that, since his resignation, he had received encouragement from Labor MPs to contest the leadership. Gillard responded to these developments by announcing a leadership election for the morning of 27 February 2012, and stating that she would be a candidate. Two days later, Rudd announced his own candidacy. Before the vote, Rudd promised that he would not initiate any further leadership challenges against Gillard should he lose, but he did not rule out becoming Leader again at a later date.

Gillard won the leadership election comfortably with 71 votes to Rudd's 31. Following the result Rudd returned to the backbenches, reiterating that he would not mount any further leadership challenges against Gillard, and stating that he would support her in any further leadership elections.

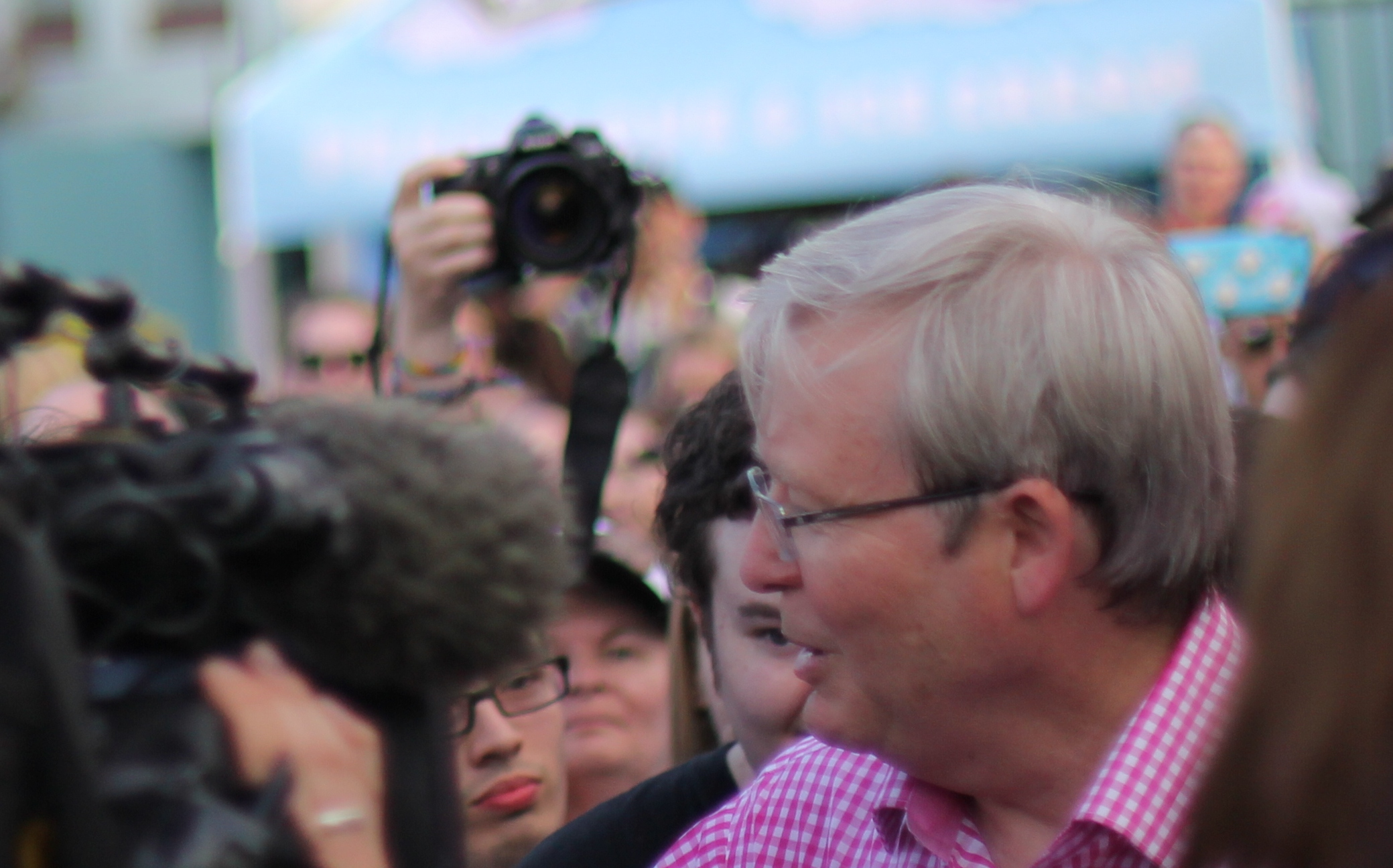
Rudd campaigning in Brisbane in 2013

=== March 2013 spill ===
On 21 March 2013, following a request from Simon Crean, the prime minister, Julia Gillard, called a leadership spill. It was widely reported that Rudd was considering nominating for the leadership of the Australian Labor Party, but he chose not to stand. Gillard was the sole candidate and was elected unopposed.

=== June 2013 spill ===
On 10 June 2013, the security of Gillard's position as leader was put in doubt following the loss of significant support in the Labor caucus. Furthermore, polling in the preceding week indicated that the party could be left with a very low number of 40 seats in the Federal Parliament, while one Labor backbencher compared the Labor Party to the Titanic. ABC reported that "some former staunch supporters" held the view that Gillard could not win the election, and ABC journalist Barrie Cassidy identified Rudd as the only feasible replacement.

The political editor of The Australian newspaper, Dennis Shanahan, reported on 10 June 2013 that Rudd had been "mobbed" by supporters in the Victorian city of Geelong days earlier and that he was "expected to be returned to the ALP leadership".

On 26 June 2013, Julia Gillard called a leadership spill, intending to head off any challenge. Rudd announced that he would challenge the prime minister. Gillard said that, in her view, the loser of the ballot should retire from politics; Rudd agreed that this would be appropriate. Key Gillard supporter Bill Shorten, who was one of the main figures responsible for Rudd's previous overturn as prime minister, this time announced his support for Rudd. Rudd subsequently won the leadership ballot, 57–45, and became the Leader of the Labor Party for the second time.

== Second term as Prime Minister (2013) ==
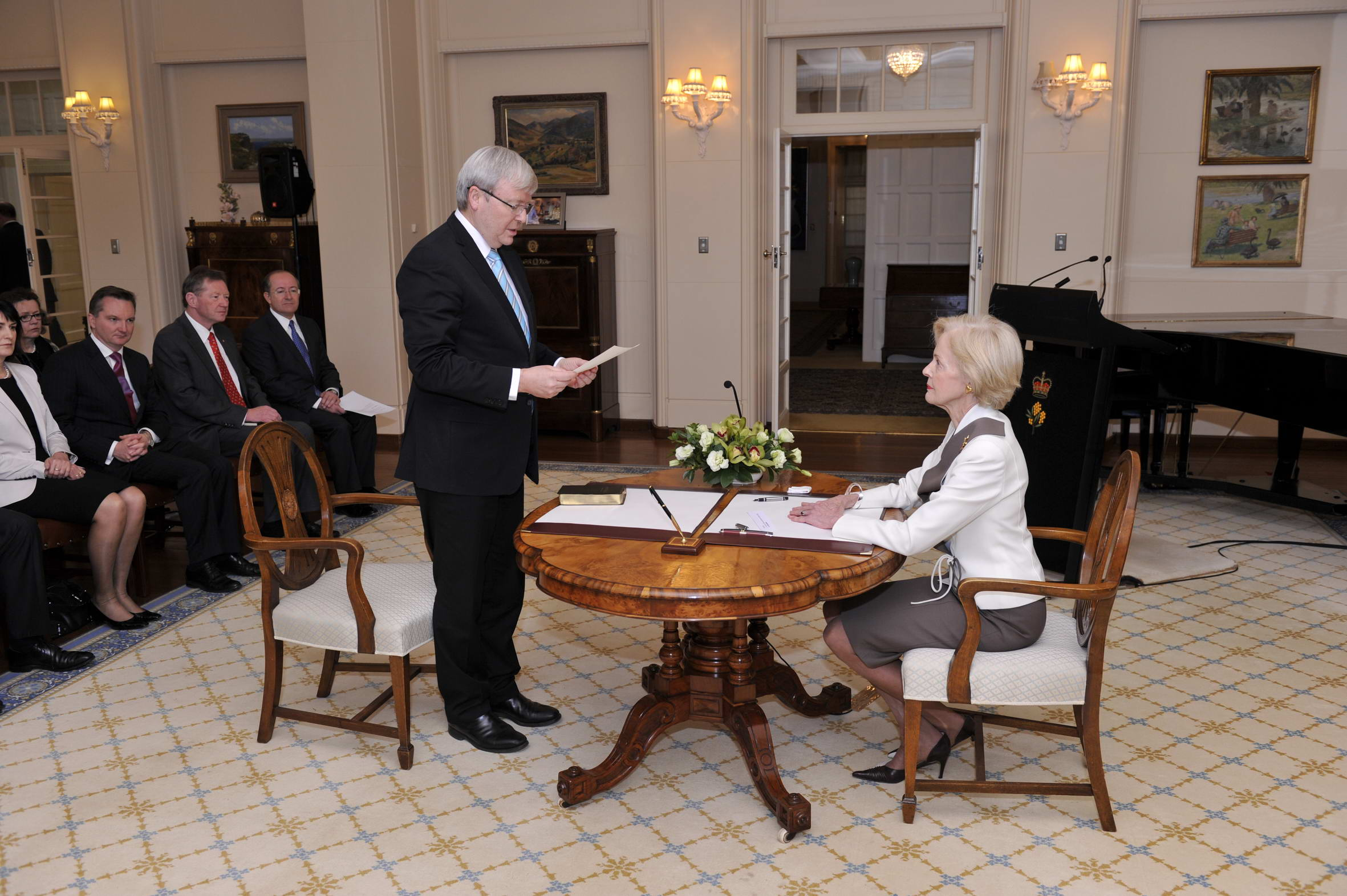
Rudd being sworn in as prime minister on 27 June 2013

Following the leadership election on 26 June 2013, Julia Gillard resigned as prime minister. After seeking legal advice from the acting solicitor-general, Robert Orr, the governor-general, Quentin Bryce, invited Rudd to be sworn in as prime minister for the second time on 27 June. At 9:53 am (AEST), Rudd was sworn in as prime minister for a second term, becoming the second Labor prime minister to have a second non-consecutive term; the first was Andrew Fisher.

=== 2013 election ===
On 4 August 2013, Rudd announced that he had visited Governor-General Quentin Bryce at Parliament House, asking her to dissolve Parliament and for a federal election to be held on 7 September. After Labor subsequently lost the election, Rudd resigned as prime minister for the second time on 18 September 2013.

== Post-political career (2013–present) ==
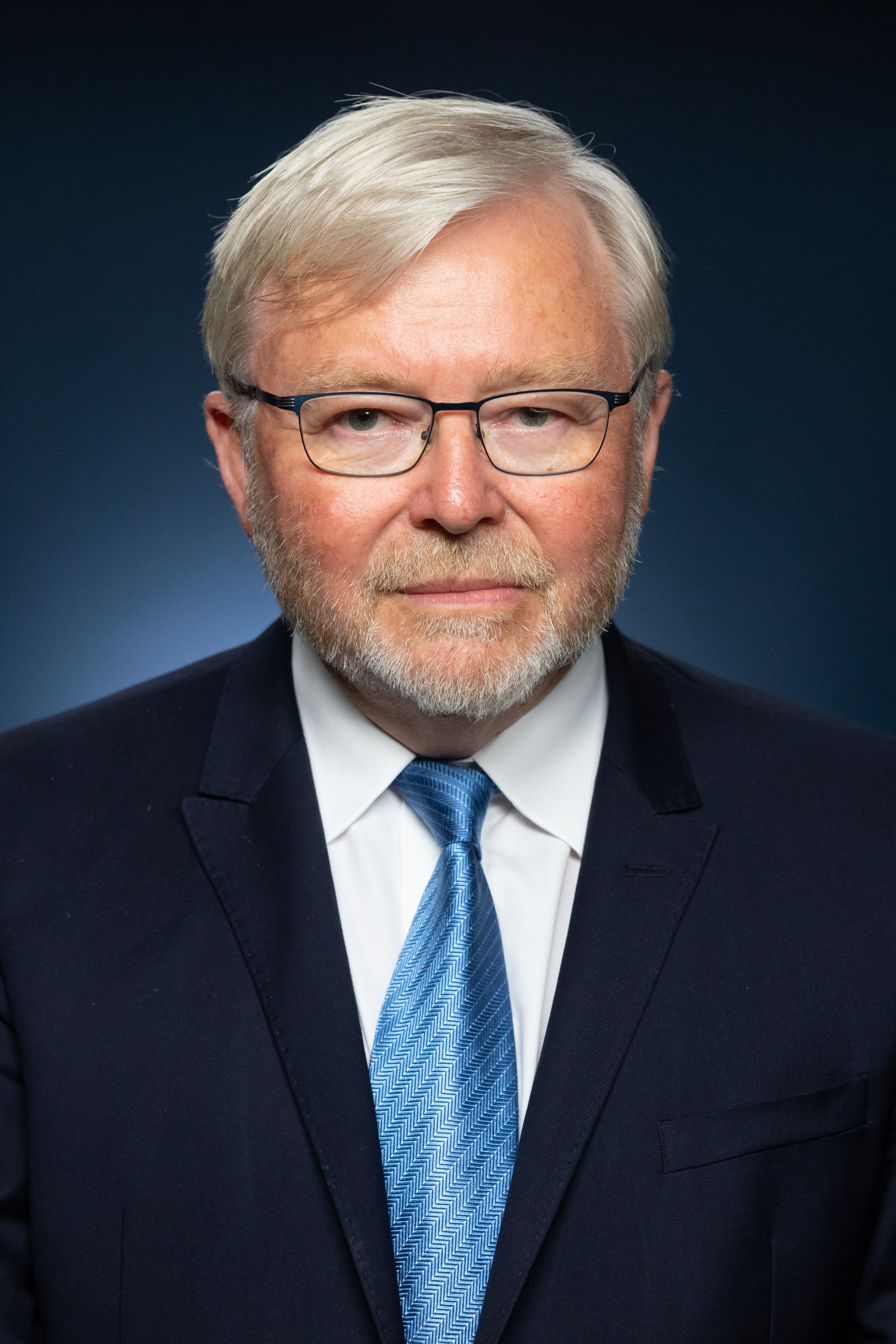
Rudd in 2023

=== Resignation from Parliament ===
On 13 November 2013, Rudd announced that he would soon resign from Parliament. In his valedictory speech to the House of Representatives, Rudd expressed his attachment to his community but said he wanted to dedicate more time to his family and minimise disruption to House proceedings. Rudd submitted his resignation in writing to the speaker, Bronwyn Bishop, on 22 November 2013, formally ending his parliamentary career. Terri Butler was selected to run for the Labor Party at the resulting by-election in the electorate of Griffith to be held on 8 February 2014. Rudd offered Butler his support and advice, and campaigned with her in a low-key appearance on 11 January 2014. Butler ultimately succeeded Rudd in the seat.

=== International roles ===
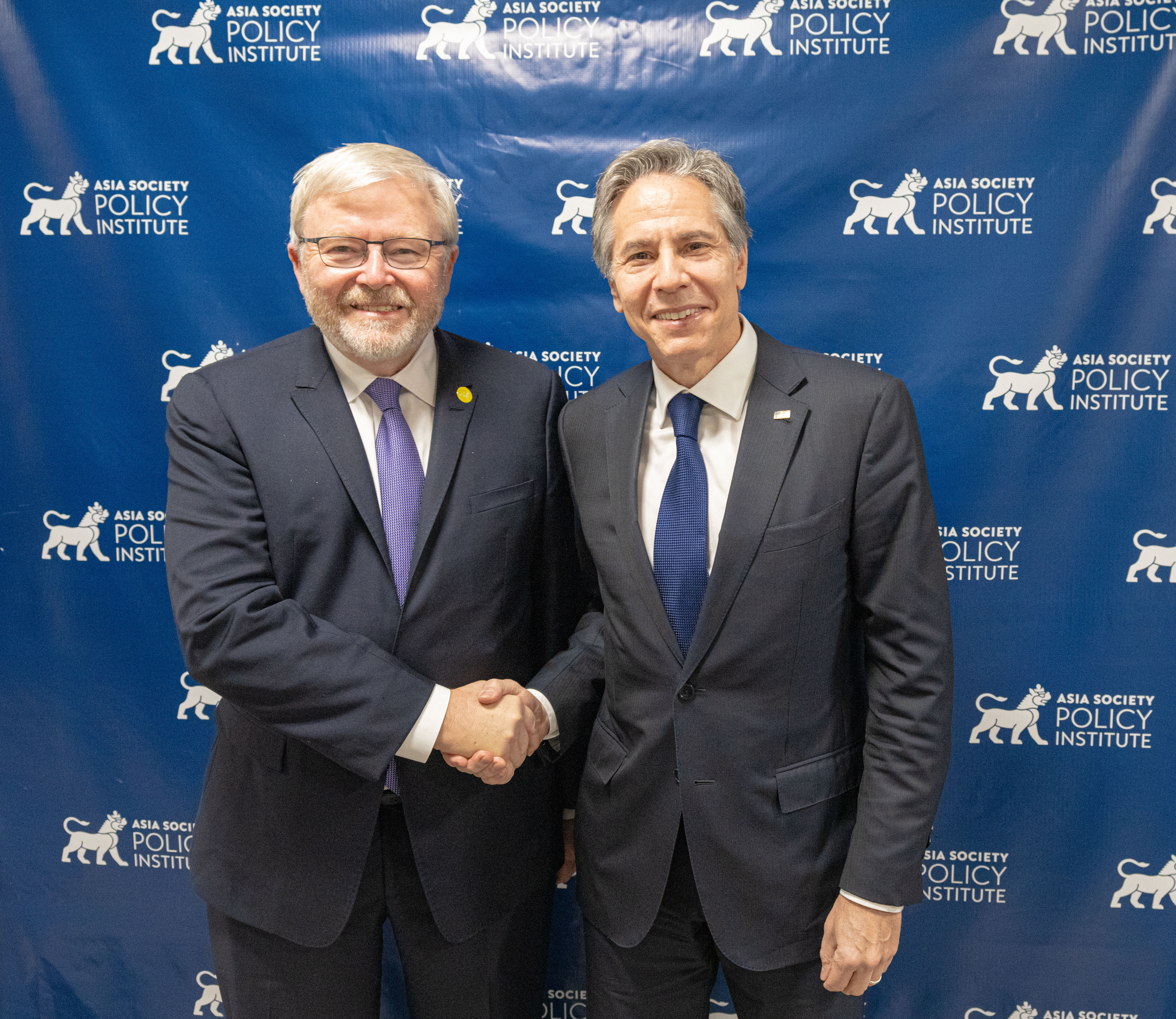
Rudd with U.S. secretary of state Antony Blinken in May 2022

In early 2014, Rudd left Australia to work in the United States, where he was appointed a Senior Fellow at the Harvard Kennedy School's Belfer Center for Science and International Affairs in Cambridge, Massachusetts, where he completed a major research effort on the future of US-China relations. Through 2014 Rudd joined the Center for Strategic and International Studies as a distinguished statesman, and was appointed a distinguished fellow at both the Paulson Institute at the University of Chicago, Illinois and Chatham House, London.

In September of that year, he was appointed Chair of the Independent Commission on Multilateralism at the International Peace Institute in Vienna, Austria, and in October became the first president of the Asia Society Policy Institute in New York City.

On 5 November 2015, Rudd was appointed to chair Sanitation and Water For All, a global partnership to achieve universal access to drinking water and adequate sanitation. He has also actively contributed to the World Economic Forum's Global Agenda Council on China. Rudd is also a member of the Berggruen Institute's 21st Century Council. On 21 October 2016, he was awarded an honorary professorship at Peking University.

In 2016, Rudd asked the Government of Australia (then a government of the Liberal-National Coalition) to nominate him for Secretary-General of the United Nations. At its meeting on 28 July, the Cabinet was divided on his suitability for the role and, on that basis, Prime Minister Malcolm Turnbull decided to decline the request; since nomination by the Australian government was considered a necessary prerequisite for candidacy, Turnbull's decision essentially ended Rudd's campaign; Rudd later confirmed as much. However, there remains dispute over what if any earlier assurances Turnbull may have given to Rudd and about what happened in the Cabinet meeting.

Rudd is also a member of the Global Leadership Foundation, a non-profit organisation comprising a network of former heads of state or government.

=== Royal commission into Australian news media ===
On 10 October 2020, Rudd launched a petition for a royal commission into what he termed the "Murdoch media monopoly" and its impact on Australian democracy. The public demand to sign the petition following Rudd's Twitter announcement caused the Australian Parliament House's ePetitions site to experience technical difficulties. On 25 October 2020, Rudd was joined by former prime minister Malcolm Turnbull who gave him his support, tweeting that he too had signed the petition. With more than 500,000 signatures, the petition became the most signed parliamentary e-petition in Australia and the third most signed parliamentary petition ever. The petition was tabled in the House of Representatives by Labor MP Andrew Leigh on 9 November 2020. Peta Credlin, a Sky News commentator gave an on air apology in February 2021 to Rudd as part of a confidential legal settlement regarding defamation over comments she made in 2020 about him and his petition.

=== Academic ===
In 2017, Rudd began studying for a doctorate on Xi Jinping at Jesus College, Oxford. In 2022, Rudd was conferred with a Doctorate of Philosophy from the University of Oxford. In his thesis, titled "China's new Marxist nationalism: defining Xi Jinping's ideological worldview", Rudd argues that Xi has adopted a more Marxist political and economic approach to government and that will have negative consequences for economic growth and China as a whole.

=== Ambassador to the United States ===
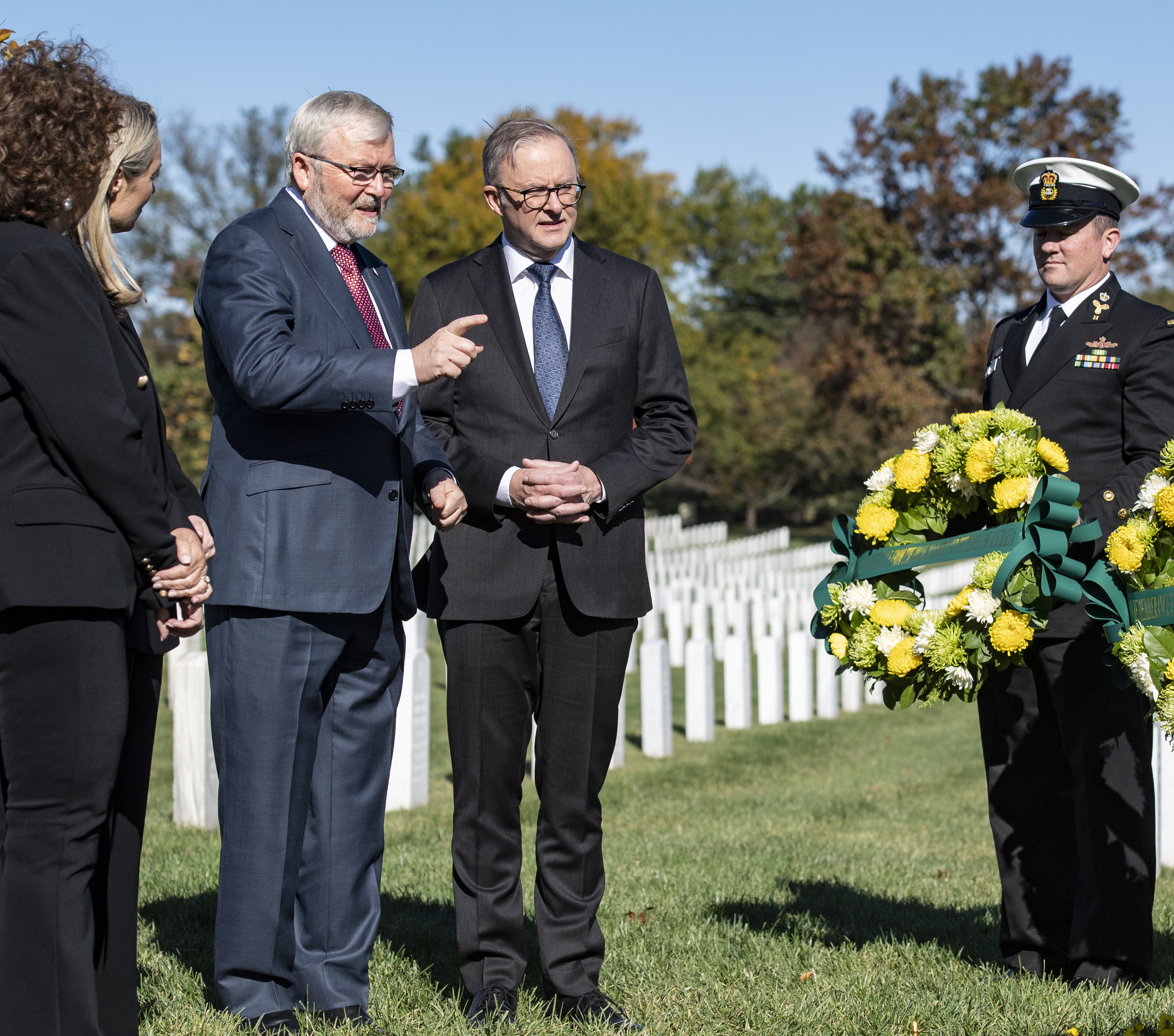
Rudd was appointed as Australia's ambassador to the U.S. by prime minister Anthony Albanese in March 2023.

In late 2022, there were calls for Rudd to be appointed as the next Australian Ambassador to the United States. On 20 December 2022, Prime Minister Anthony Albanese and Minister for Foreign Affairs Penny Wong announced that Rudd would be appointed as the 23rd Ambassador of Australia to the United States in early 2023, succeeding Arthur Sinodinos. Rudd assumed the position on 20 March 2023.

In March 2024, Rudd was criticised by former US president Donald Trump, who labelled him "nasty" and indicated that he would be removed as ambassador to the US should Trump win the 2024 presidential election. Rudd had previously been highly critical of Trump during his first presidency. Penny Wong later clarified that Rudd would stay on as ambassador even in the result of Trump winning the election.

In the role, Rudd has been a vocal advocate for AUKUS security partnership, urging American decision makers to implement its promise of technology sharing. While it was hoped he might defuse tension between the United States and China in the role, Rudd has become a blunt critic of China's expansionism.

In October 2025, Rudd accompanied Albanese to a White House meeting with President Trump, which focused on a bilateral Rare-earth mineral supply agreement and the supply of nuclear-powered submarines to Australia. During the White House visit, Trump rebuked Rudd for making critical social media remarks about him in the past; following the press conference, Rudd personally apologised to Trump. While Albanese and veteran Republican Michael McCaul expressed confidence in Rudd's position as Ambassador to the United States, Opposition Leader Sussan Ley argued that Rudd's position was no longer tenable. Ley withdrew her comments the next day, acknowledging the role is a "big job", and that Rudd was the "prime minister's choice for ambassador".

In January 2026, it was announced that Rudd will end his tenure as Ambassador to the United States on 31 March 2026. Rudd will become the global president of international relations at the Asia Society.

== Writings ==
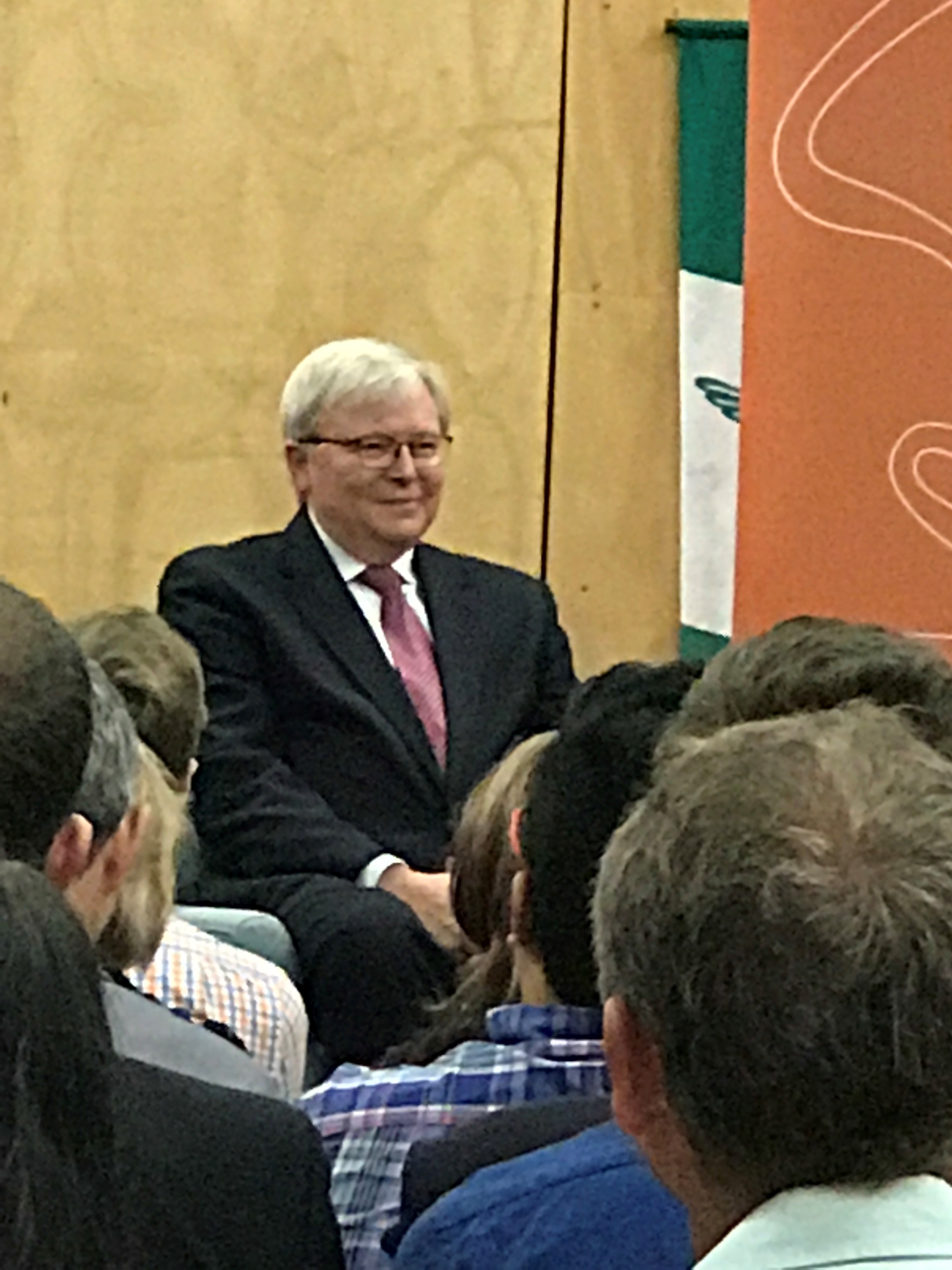
Rudd at the book launch for the first volume of his autobiography at Bulimba State School, October 2017

Rudd has authored several books. While prime minister, he co-authored a children's book with entertainer Rhys Muldoon, Jasper & Abby and the Great Australia Day Kerfuffle, which was published in 2010. In October 2017, Rudd launched the first volume of his autobiography, entitled Not for the Faint-hearted: A Personal Reflection on Life, Politics and Purpose, which chronicles his life until becoming prime minister in 2007. The following year, he published the second volume of his autobiography, The PM Years, which covers his prime ministership, the events leading to his removal, and his subsequent return to the position in 2013.

In March 2021, Rudd published The Case for Courage as part of Monash University Publishing's In the National Interest series. The book details Rupert Murdoch's domination of the Australian media landscape and poses ideas for how the Labor Party can ensure longevity in office. His next book, The Avoidable War, focuses on the bilateral relationship between the United States and China and how the two nations can avoid conflict.

== Personal life ==
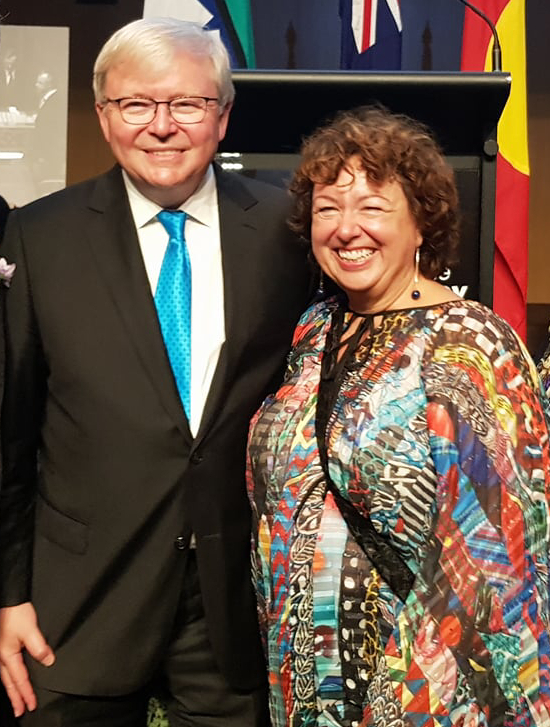
Rudd and his wife Thérèse Rein in February 2018

In 1981, Rudd married Thérèse Rein whom he had met at a gathering of the Australian Student Christian Movement during his university years. Both were residents at Burgmann College during their first year of university. Rudd and Rein have three children. Rudd is a supporter of the Brisbane Lions.

In 2011, Rudd won a tea-making competition in a competition to create Twinings' Australian Afternoon variety and announced that the proceeds from the sales of this blend will be donated to the RSPCA. In 2016, Twinings stopped donating the proceeds from the sales of this tea variety to the RSPCA.

=== Religion ===
Rudd and his family attend the Anglican church of St John the Baptist in Bulimba in his electorate. Although raised a Roman Catholic, Rudd was actively involved in the Evangelical Union while studying at the Australian National University, and he began attending Anglican services in the 1980s with his wife. In December 2009, Rudd attended a Catholic Mass to commemorate the canonisation of Mary MacKillop at which he received Holy Communion. Rudd's actions provoked criticism and debate among both political and religious circles. A report by The Australian quoted that Rudd embraced Anglicanism but at the same time did not formally renounce his Catholic faith.

Rudd was a mainstay of the parliamentary prayer group in Parliament House, Canberra. He has been vocal about his Christianity and has given a number of prominent interviews to the Australian religious press on the topic. Rudd has defended church representatives engaging with policy debates, particularly with respect to WorkChoices legislation, climate change, global poverty, therapeutic cloning, and asylum seekers. In 2003, he described himself as "an old-fashioned Christian socialist". In a 2006 essay in The Monthly, he argued:

A [truly] Christian perspective on contemporary policy debates may not prevail. It must nonetheless be argued. And once heard, it must be weighed, together with other arguments from different philosophical traditions, in a fully contestable secular polity. A Christian perspective, informed by a social gospel or Christian socialist tradition, should not be rejected contemptuously by secular politicians as if these views are an unwelcome intrusion into the political sphere. If the churches are barred from participating in the great debates about the values that ultimately underpin our society, our economy and our polity, then we have reached a very strange place indeed.

He cites Dietrich Bonhoeffer as a personal inspiration in this regard.

When in Canberra, Rudd and Rein worshipped at St John the Baptist Church, Reid, where they were married. Rudd often did a "door stop" interview for the media when leaving the church yard.

=== Health ===
In 1993, Rudd underwent a cardiac valve transplant operation (Ross procedure), receiving a cadaveric aortic valve replacement for rheumatic heart disease. In 2011, Rudd underwent a second cardiac valve transplant operation, making a full recovery from the surgery.

== Published works ==
External videos
- After Words interview with Rudd on The Avoidable War, April 10, 2022, C-SPAN

- Rudd, Kevin (2009). Building on ASEAN's Success: Towards an Asia Pacific Community. Singapore: ISEAS Publishing. ISBN 978-9812308719.
- Rudd, Kevin (2017). Not for the Faint-hearted: A Personal Reflection on Life, Politics and Purpose. Sydney: Pan Macmillan Australia. ISBN 9781743534830.
- Rudd, Kevin (2018). The PM Years. Sydney: Pan Macmillan Australia. ISBN 9781760556686.
- Rudd, Kevin (2021). The Case for Courage. Melbourne: Monash University Publishing. ISBN 9781922464156.
- Rudd, Kevin (2022). The Avoidable War: The Dangers of a Catastrophic Conflict between the US and Xi Jinping's China. PublicAffairs. ISBN 978-1541701298.
- Rudd, Kevin (2024). On Xi Jinping: How Xi's Marxist Nationalism is Shaping China and the World. Oxford University Press. ISBN 978-0197766033.

== See also ==
- Second Rudd Ministry
- List of prime ministers of Elizabeth II

== Bibliography ==
- Crabb, Annabel (2010). Rise of the Ruddbot:Observations from the Gallery. Melbourne: Black Inc. ISBN 978-1-86395-483-9.
- Hartcher, Peter (2009). To the Bitter End : The Dramatic Story of the Fall of John Howard and the Rise of Kevin Rudd. Crows Nest, NSW: Allen & Unwin. ISBN 978-1-74175-623-4.
- Paul Kelly, Triumph and Demise: The Broken Promise of a Labor Generation, Melbourne University Press, 2014. ISBN 9780522862102 Triumph and Demise
- Macklin, Robert (2007). Kevin Rudd : The Biography. Camberwell, Vic.: Penguin Books Australia. ISBN 978-0-670-07135-7.
- Marr, David (2010). Power Trip : The Political Journey of Kevin Rudd. Quarterly Essay. Melbourne: Black Inc. ISBN 978-1-86395-477-8.
- Stuart, Nicholas (2007). Kevin Rudd : An Unauthorised Political Biography. Melbourne: Scribe. ISBN 978-1-921215-58-2.
- Weller, Patrick (2014). Kevin Rudd: Twice Prime Minister. Carlton, Vic.: Melbourne University Press. ISBN 978-0-522-85748-1.

Parliament of Australia
Preceded by Graeme McDougall	Member for Griffith; 1998–2013	Succeeded by Terri Butler
Political offices
Preceded by Laurie Brereton	Shadow Minister for Foreign Affairs; 2001–2006	Succeeded by Bob McClelland
New office	Shadow Minister for International Security; 2003–2006	Office abolished
Preceded by Simon Crean	Shadow Minister for Trade; 2005–2006	Succeeded by Simon Crean as Shadow Minister for Trade and Regional Development
Preceded by Kim Beazley	Leader of the Opposition of Australia; 2006–2007	Succeeded by Brendan Nelson
Preceded by John Howard	Prime Minister of Australia; 2007–2010	Succeeded by Julia Gillard
Preceded by Stephen Smith	Minister for Foreign Affairs; 2010–2012	Succeeded by Bob Carr
Preceded by Julia Gillard	Prime Minister of Australia; 2013	Succeeded by Tony Abbott
Party political offices
Preceded by Kim Beazley	Leader of the Australian Labor Party; 2006–2010	Succeeded by Julia Gillard
Preceded by Julia Gillard	Leader of the Australian Labor Party; 2013	Succeeded by Bill Shorten
Academic offices
Preceded by Position created	Chair of Sanitation and Water for All; 2015–2023	Succeeded by Patrick Moriarty
Preceded by Michael Doyle	Chair of the International Peace Institute; 2018–2023	Succeeded by Jean Todt
Preceded by Josette Sheeran	President and CEO of the Asia Society; 2021–2023	Succeeded by Kang Kyung-wha
Preceded by Kang Kyung-wha	President and CEO of the Asia Society; 2026–present	Succeeded by Incumbent
Diplomatic posts
Preceded by Arthur Sinodinos	Ambassador of Australia to the United States; 2023–2026	Succeeded by Greg Moriarty
