= The Avoidable War =

2022 book by Kevin Rudd

The Avoidable War: The Dangers of a Catastrophic Conflict between the US and Xi Jinping's China
- Author: Kevin Rudd
- Language: English
- Subject: Geopolitics
- Genre: non-fiction
- Published: 22 March 2022
- Publisher: PublicAffairs
- Publication place: United States
- Media type: Paperback
- Pages: 432
- ISBN: 978-1541701298

The Avoidable War: The Dangers of a Catastrophic Conflict between the US and Xi Jinping's China is a non-fiction book by Kevin Rudd, the former prime minister of Australia.

== Overview and content ==
In the book's 17 chapters, the author talks about the relationship between the United States and China as well as ways to handle competition between these two great powers to avoid a conflict that could have catastrophic consequences.

== Reception ==
In a book review at The Financial Times, James Crabtree writes, "Rudd’s book provides a rich and realistic portrayal of China’s motivations, as well as a stark warning to a world standing on the edge of a conflict potentially far more devastating than Russia’s recent invasion of Ukraine. His argument contains an intriguing balance of pessimism and optimism. On the one hand, competition between the superpowers is inevitable. Rudd sketches out 10 plausible scenarios over Taiwan, half of which end in military confrontation."

Writing for The Sasakawa Peace Foundation, Thomas Wilkens of the Australian Strategic Policy Institute writes, "Rudd illustrates why he believes the dangers have increased through his systematic analysis of the Xi Jinping regime’s worldview and how this will grate against American strategic interests. In the course of the book, he provides reasoned argument and trenchant analysis of this worldview, affording valuable observations throughout, based on his familiarity with China and vast diplomatic experience (of which he frequently reminds the reader)."

Australian Naval Institute's Tim Coyle writes in his book review, "Kevin Rudd aims this book at an American readership; however, it is equally appliable to regional and extra-regional countries as any war between the US and China would be catastrophic for the world."
