= Student affairs =

Department of services for student success at institutions of higher education

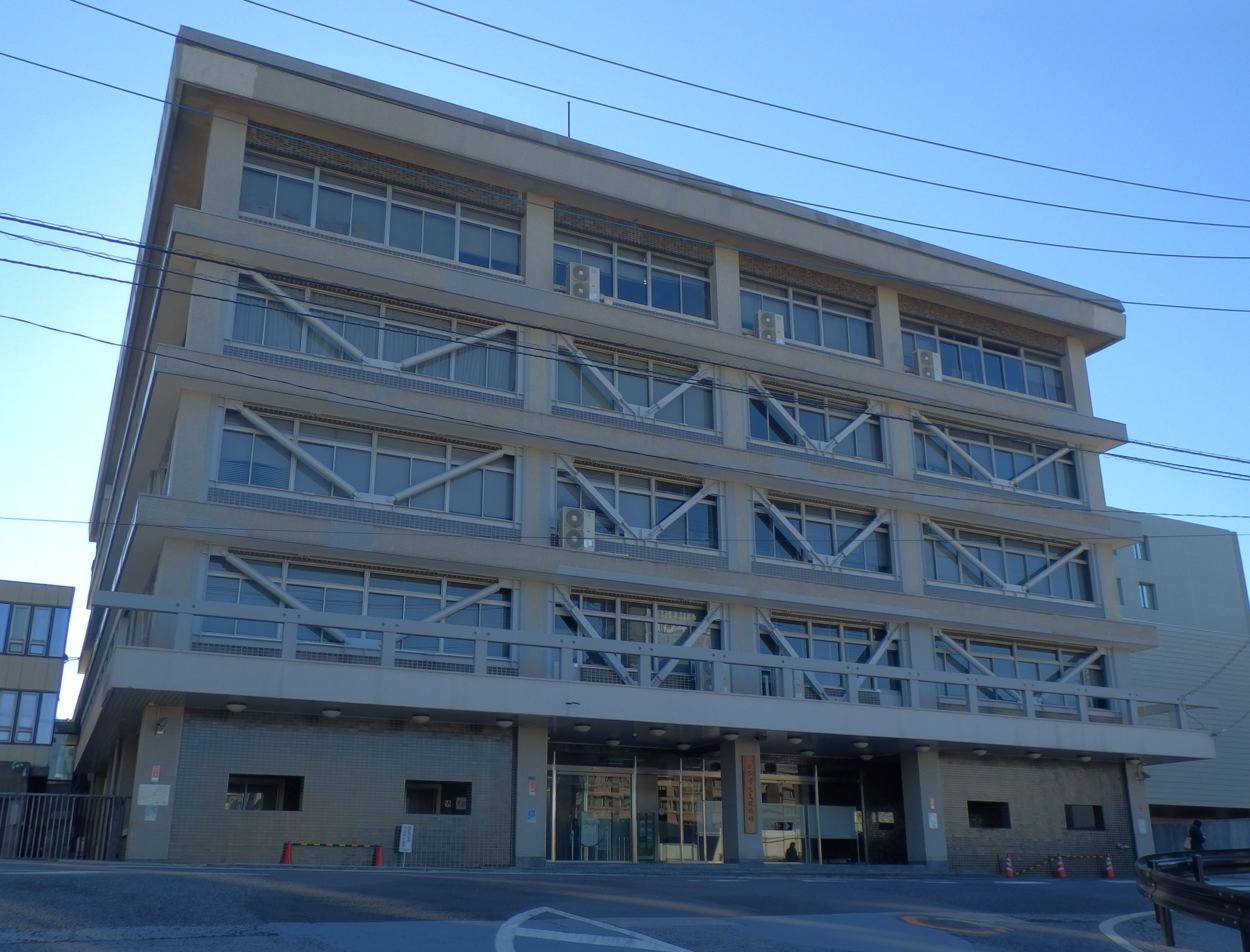
Headquarters of the Japan Student Services Organization in Tokyo.

Student affairs, student support, or student services is the department or division of services and support for student success at institutions of higher education to enhance student growth and development. People who work in this field are known as student affairs educators, student affairs practitioners, or student affairs professionals. These student affairs practitioners work to provide services and support for students and drive student learning outside of the classroom at institutions of higher education.

The size and organization of a student affairs division or department may vary based on the size, type, and location of an institution. The title of the senior student affairs and services officer also varies widely; traditionally in the United States, this position has been known as the "dean of students", as distinguished from the academic dean or the deans of individual schools within a university. In some institutions today, student affairs departments are led by a vice president or vice chancellor who then reports directly to the president/chancellor of the institution. In other cases the head of student affairs may report to the provost or academic dean.

== History ==
Although institutions of higher education have had to deal with student affairs in some way for as long as they have existed, student affairs as a distinct professional field emerged first in the Anglo-American context in the late 19th century. There it developed from the originally distinct positions of "dean of women" and "dean of men". The field developed much later in continental Europe, where development first began in the 1950s but was greatly spurred when the Bologna Process in the 1990s created a surge in international students with greater needs for student support. Similarly in many other countries where student affairs is still a largely inchoate profession, such as Uruguay, professional activity in the field has emerged in relation to the needs of international students.

=== Asian Pacific Region ===
In 1988, Asia Pacific Student Services Association (APSSA) was created after representatives of the Asia Pacific Student Affairs Conference recognized there was a need for more communication and partnerships between student affairs professionals and the institutions they worked for. The work that APSSA does focuses creating a space for international collaboration through conferences with internal attendees and training and staff networking programs through the Institute of Student Affairs (ISA). ISA is the standing committee for APSSA's Executive Committee, and manages the planning and marketing for training and networking programs. In 2021, the Institute has five recorded Program Coordinators from different countries and regions: Japan, Hong Kong, the Philippines, Malaysia, and China. From 2018 to 2022, Maria Paquita D. Bonnet from De La Salle University in the Philippines was appointed to the position of Director of ISA.

APSSA holds a staff conference every two years where individuals from different countries will come together and encourage ideas for student affairs workers and offices to collaborate with one another. This conference allows for networking between organizations and staff and upholds APSSA's goal of global collaboration. This society also holds a student conference, which allows for student leaders from participating countries to meet and nurture their leadership strengths together, while also allowing students to have a platform to share their thoughts and ideas for activities and careers.

=== Canada ===
Student affairs in Canadian higher education dates back to the vocational school established at the Collège des Jésuites in seventeenth century. Additional development of Canadian student services has many similarities with authoritarian teaching in terms of monitoring and controlling students behaviour on campus that was common in United States in nineteenth century. The protest that occurred at Queen's University in 1875, when Principal William Snodgrass suspended several students for drinking, indicated a need for closer observation for students' conduct. After the Principal Snodgrass sent a report to the Senate, two students were suspended. They were allowed to attend the class, but could not graduate. Their friends appealed against the suspension, and refused to go to the class. Since the Senate rejected their request, all students returned to their class in a week. In order to prevent further misbehaviour, staff representatives started to be more engaged in students life organizing social, cultural and physical activities.

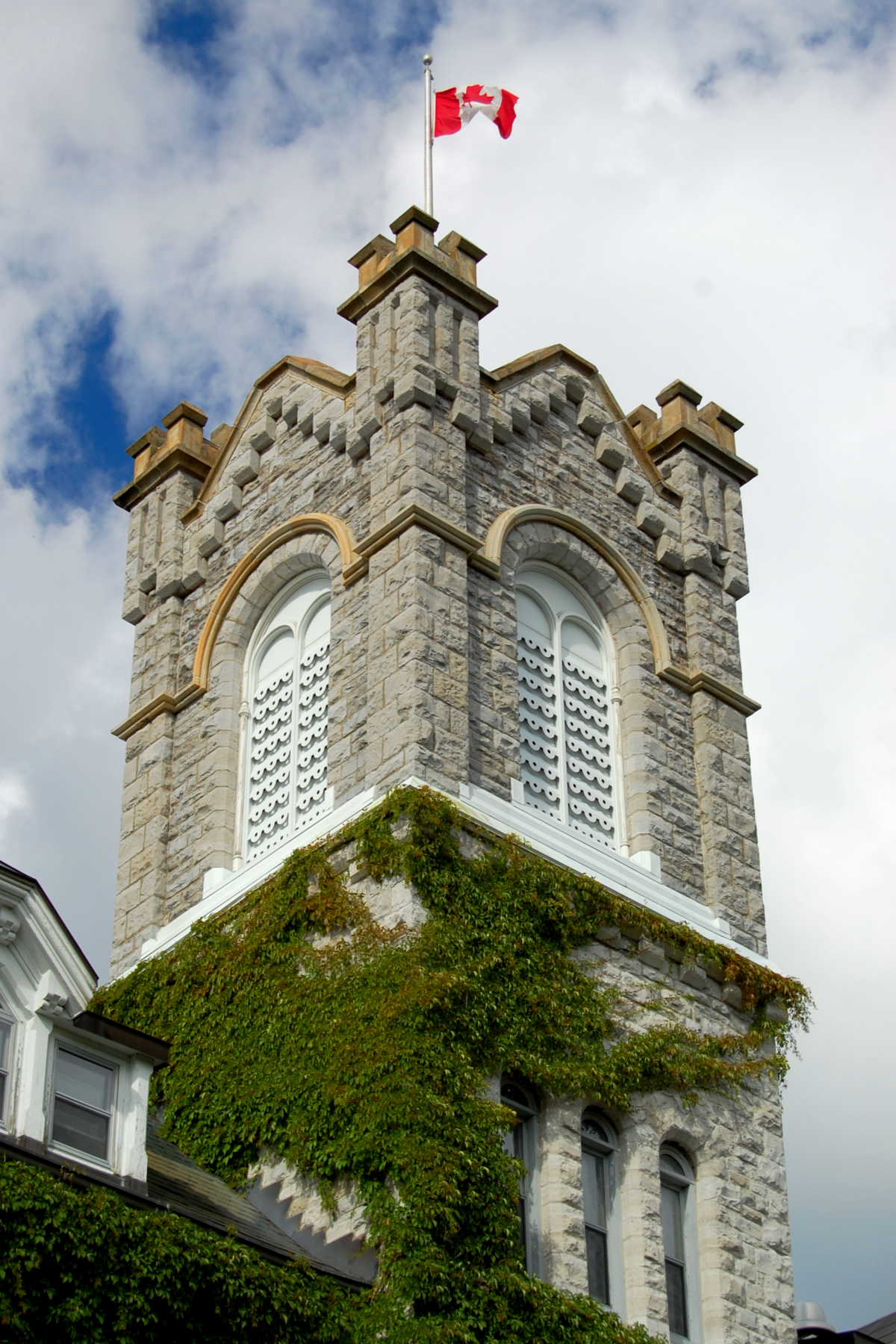
Theological Hall on Queen's Campus in Kingston (Canada)

Several decades later, the Queen's Rev Principal Robert Bruce Taylor emphasized importance of students representatives role by including deans of men and women to be elected and responsible for cooperation with administration, student events and regulations. They used to live on several campuses to supervise visitors, off-campus housing, dress code, etc. The first Dean of Women Caroline McNeil started at Queen's in 1918 and soon, the other Canadian universities appointed dean of men and women on their campuses.

After the Second World War the professionalization of student affairs expanded by supporting soldiers who received tuition and living assistance based on Veterans Rehabilitation Act in 1945. Within the educational system, veterans received personal support and career counselling, but the other students were put on a side. While in the last seven decades Canadian student affairs has developed to support all students in financial need, career services, housing, residence life and academic advising, it was also reorganized frequently, e.g.:

- Canadian Association of Career Educators & Employers (CACEE) in 1995; previous University Advisory Services (UAS) in 1946; University Counselling and Placement Association (UCPA) in 1952
- Canadian Association of College and University Student Services (CACUSS) in 1971; previous Association of University Student Personnel Services (CAUSPS-1) in 1953; Council of Associations of University Student Personnel Services (CAUSPS-2) in 1961

Today, CACUSS arranges conferences, develops network and discussion within postsecondary community, publish a national magazine Communiqué and remains the leader of Canadian student affairs professionals. The CACUSS has included variety of organizations that recognize the specific needs of all provinces including Indigenous students, students with disabilities, financial aid, academic integrity and judicial affairs, international students, etc.

Student affairs are also impacted by governance and decision making efforts in the form of students' unions at post-secondary educational institutions. In most provinces, students' unions are recognized as mandatory through legislation. In Ontario, these entities are formally recognized under Bill 184 2011 which acknowledges the autonomy of student associations in order to foster governance, accountability, and collaboration between student associations and post-secondary educational institutions, as well as addressing issues related to fee collection and remittance between these two parties. The impact that student associations can have on student affairs issues is exemplified by challenges to the Student Choice Initiative where the Canadian Federation of Students and the York Federation of Students challenged an initiative launched by the Ontario Ministry of Training, Colleges & Universities. This particular initiative was aimed at providing students with the ability to opt-out of various supplementary fees during their enrolment process and also to provide them with a transparent itemization of their tuition and supplementary fees. The opposition by the Canadian Federation of Students and the York Federation of Students ultimately led to the successful overturning of the Student Choice Initiative, by the Divisional Court of Ontario. This event is noteworthy with respect to student affairs, because it demonstrates the impact that student associations can have on downstream funding necessary for delivering student services.

Canadian student affairs continues to develop and prepare professionals by recognizing demands of growing internationalization, diversity and sustainability in higher education. The specialization and further expansion is identified to focus on students' mental health, experiential learning, academic integrity and equity, diversity and inclusion to enhance their learning achievement and wellbeing.

=== South Africa ===
Student affairs did not become a unitary profession in South Africa until the end of apartheid in 1994. As in other countries of sub-Saharan Africa, South African universities have broadly followed an American model of student affairs administration. Difficulties in the implementation of student affairs principles from developed countries has been characterized as due to South Africa's status as a developing country.

=== United Kingdom ===
Student affairs draws its origins on the Oxbridge model and the Anglo-American concept that schools stand in loco parentis, creating a greater legal obligation for the university to govern student life. However, professional student affairs administration in the United Kingdom is of relatively recent date: student affairs departments became a feature of all United Kingdom universities in 1992, having previously been widespread only in the new universities.

=== United States ===
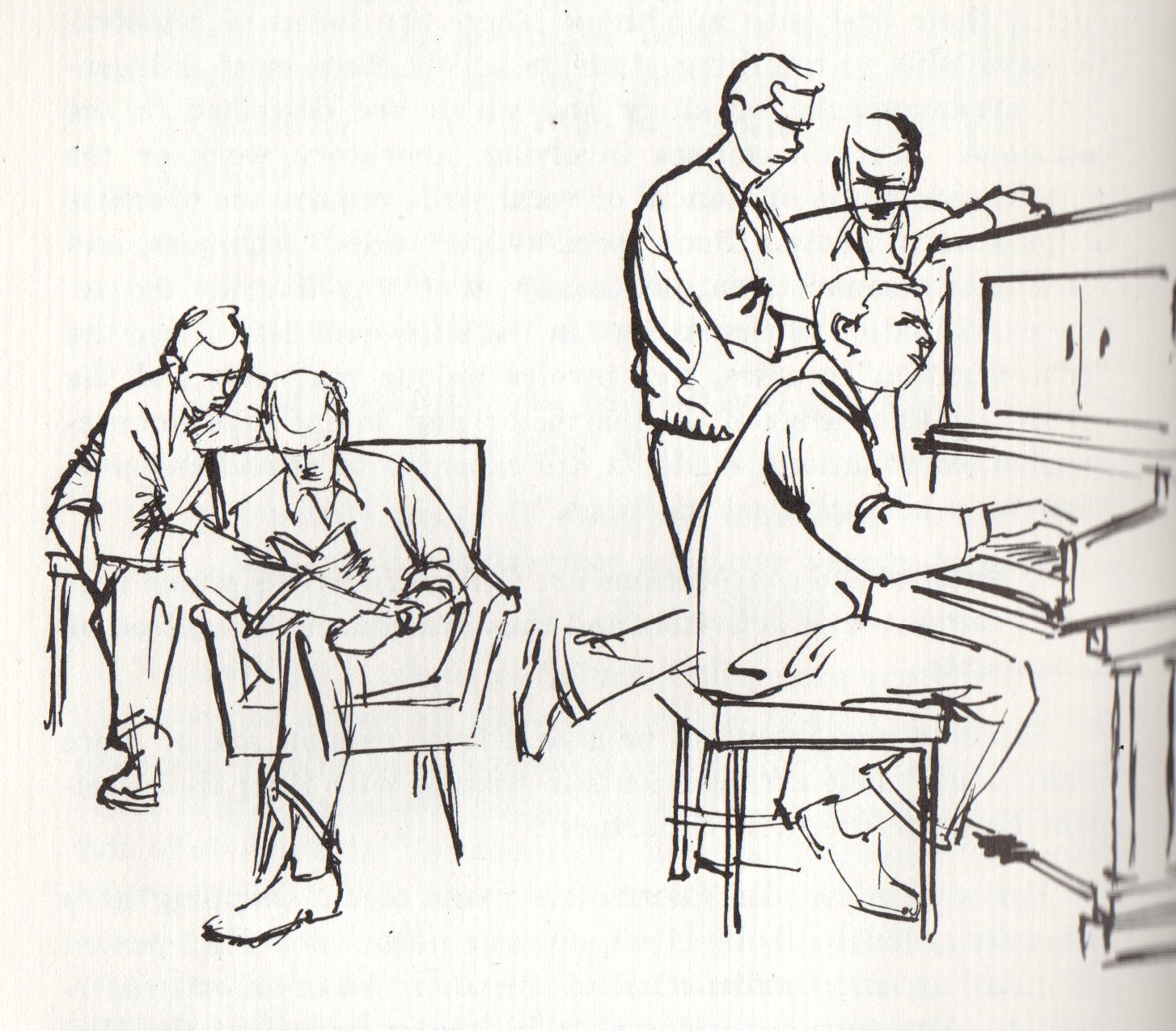
Idealized depiction of student life from a 1960 Shimer College handbook

The profession of student affairs "grew from the campus up, not from theory down". Early higher education in the United States was based on the Oxbridge model of education; thus, most early institutions were residential and the tutors lived in the halls with the students. These men were the precursor to student affairs professionals in the United States. Typically, they served as dean of discipline and in loco parentis (in place of the parent). These early student affairs practitioners' focus was on control of the student as opposed to modern philosophy which focuses on the development of the student as a whole, but has always connected those interested in the welfare of students with students needing assistance.

In the late 19th and early 20th centuries, as the number of land-grant institutions increased, enrollment expanded, student populations began to include women, the idea of vocationalism began to influence academics and the institution's president began to be viewed as "the chief moral front". With these changes it became apparent that additional staff members were needed to allow the president to respond to the issues of finance and faculty recruitment.

These first student affairs professionals were the dean of women, dean of men and personnel workers. Many of the early deans came from "teaching roles in the liberal arts". The first dean of men was LeBaron Russell Briggs at Harvard University in 1890, with the first dean of women being Adelia Field Johnston in 1869 at the Oberlin College as lady principal and later named dean of women in 1894. Alice Freeman Palmer in 1892 at the University of Chicago was the first to hold the title of dean of women.

The dean of men's position typically included discipline, but could vary depending on the institution's overall philosophy. The position description might have read, "that officer in the administration who undertakes to assist the men students [to] achieve the utmost of which they are individually capable, through personal effort on their behalf, and through mobilizing in their behalf all the forces within the University which can be made to serve this end". The one thing that remained consistent was the responsibility to deal with men and help them develop to their potential.

Deans of Women were trail blazers as women in positions of authority. Not only were women at colleges and universities a new development, but women as staff members even more new. The institutional leadership was dominated by men, but still they persevered including the founding of what is now the American Association of University Women (AAUW) in 1903.

In December 1918 Robert Rienow, the dean of men at the University of Iowa, wrote a letter to Thomas Arkle Clark, dean of men at the University of Illinois, suggesting a meeting that is now recognized as the founding of the organization now known as NASPA - Student Affairs Administrators in Higher Education.

In 1924, May L. Cheney, who organized a teacher placement office at the University of California, Berkeley, helped form the National Association of Appointment Secretaries (NAAS). That year, NAAS met for the first time and came as guests of the National Association of Deans of Women (NADW) to a convention sponsored by the Department Superintendence of the National Education Association. In 1929, forty-six NAAS members registered for the Sixth Annual Convention. NAAS became the National Association of Personnel and Placement Officers (NAPPO). The name American College Personnel Association (ACPA) was adopted in 1931. Association communication consisted of one mailed newsletter, the Personnel-O-Gram (P-O-G). In 1937, the Student Personnel Point of View statement was developed by leaders of the American Council on Education (ACE) and ACPA.

The Student Personnel Points of View, written in 1937 and 1949, further developed the area of student affairs.

In the 1960s the student development movement arose. Based on student development theory, it originated in the context of broad campus unrest during the 1960s. The aim of student development was to better integrate students into mass higher education and modern society.

In the 1970s the landscape of student affairs began to change when the voting age was lowered and 18-year-olds were granted adult status in the eyes of the law.

In the United States as early as 1992, student affairs began to see a change in the reporting structure. Chief student affairs officers began to shift to the provost, the chief academic officer.

== At community college ==
The work of student affairs is critical across all institutional types, but essential at a community college, an open access institution. While enrollment at community colleges are holding steady across the country, the students within this population require more assistance, both in and out of the classroom.

== Student affairs professionals ==
Student affairs professionals are individuals who serve in a supportive capacity and provide a variety of supports and services within higher education.

Roles range from service providers to senior leadership. Staff have diverse backgrounds and programs of study, bringing a wealth of knowledge and research aimed at best supporting students in their development during the course of their studies. Relying on current student development theories, they support the whole student (physical, emotional, and mental health). Challenges in meeting this goal include budget cuts, emotional strain, crisis-related issues, feeling devalued, and having to do more with less.

Student affairs professionals are often the first point of contact for students in crisis situations, which may include sexual violence, suicidal ideation, severe mental health episodes, hate crimes and discrimination. As first responders with exposure to traumatic information, they may be prone to occupational burnout and compassion fatigue.

=== Preparation ===
Some student affairs professionals and college student personnel (CSP) have completed graduate work with a complementary assistantship. An assistantship can be an entry-level position, but is usually a part-time paraprofessional position with compensation including tuition waiver, professional development and a stipend. These are sometimes called graduate assistant positions. The graduate program is usually two academic years of full-time study with opportunities for internship and abroad opportunities. Universities offer graduate programs sometimes called College Student Personnel (for example, at Bucknell University), Higher Education Student Affairs, or Educational Leadership which lead to a Master of Education (MEd), Master of Arts (MA) degree, or Master of Science (MSc) degree. Doctoral programs also exist for student affairs professionals, leading to a Doctorate in Education (EdD) or Doctor of Philosophy (PhD).

Student affairs professionals or college student personnel (CSP) graduate programs may include classes in psychology, business, law, communication, inter- and intra-personal counseling, higher education, and group dynamics. These help to form a foundation for creating relationships with students, faculty, staff, and parents. College student personnel programs tend to be found in departments of leadership, counseling, psychology and education. Traditionally these programs have an emphasis in administration, student development theory, or counseling.

There are also many other ways to learn more about and prepare for a position in student affairs. This can include completing certificates, reading prominent journals, volunteering or attending conferences for student affairs organizations (such as CACUSS or other professional organizations as listed below), and networking with student affairs professionals.

For Canadians looking to enter student affairs, some useful certificates to attain can include SafeTalk training, Applied Suicide Intervention Skills Training (ASIST), Mental Health First Aid training, and Standard First Aid training. Additionally, it is important for student affairs professionals to have theoretical and practical knowledge and experiences in providing support and resources to students outside the classroom.

==== Identity development theories and psychological terms associated with education and student affairs ====
Developmental psychology and Student development theories used in college student personnel programs include:

- Chickering's Seven Vectors
- Astin's Theory of Involvement
- Komives, Owen, Longerbeam, Mainella and Osteen's Leadership Identity Development
- Gilligan's Theory of Moral Development
- Piaget's theory of cognitive development
- Erikson's theory of human development
- Tinto's model of student retention

==== Student identity development of distinct minoritized groups ====
The student population in higher education is composed of many unique individual groups. Students from distinct minoritized groups may have different, yet established paths of student identity development. There are many theories of student identity development which describe identity development within distinct groups. Some examples of student development theories student development theories within distinct groups include:

- Racial Identity and Development
- Ethnic identity development
- Sexual identity and development
- Gender identity and development
- Faith and spirituality identity and development
- Disability Identity and Development
- Social Class Identity and Development
- Digital Identity and Development (see also Online identity)
- National Identity and Development
- Feminist Identity and Development
- Veteran Identity and Development
- Athletic Identity and Development

In equitable institutions it is important for Student Affairs professionals to understand the needs of the distinct groups that they service as well as their own social identity including privilege and bias.

==== Related Psychology/ psychological theories ====
- Maslow's Hierarchy of Needs

== Areas ==
The functional areas of student affairs and services are considered by several professional associations including: ACPA, CAS, CACUSS, and NASPA. Growing research in the field of student affairs and services contributes to our understanding of how these functional areas are organized and operationalized. The composition and structure of these functional areas differs across various institutions, and continues to be shaped as new information is gathered pertaining to the needs of students in post-secondary education.

NASPA outlines 39 functional areas of student affairs and services:

- Aboriginal Student Services
- Academic advising
- Admissions
- Alumni programs
- Campus activities
- Campus safety
- Co-operative Education and Career Success/Services
- Civic learning and democratic engagement
- Clinical health programs
- College unions
- Community service/Service learning
- Commuter student services
- Counseling services
- Disability support services/Accessibility services
- Enrollment management
- Experiential Learning (Work-Integrated Learning)
- Federated and affiliated colleges
- Financial aid
- Graduates and professional student services
- Greek affairs
- Intercollegiate athletics
- International student services
- Learning assistance/Academic support services
- LGBTQ student services
- Multicultural services
- Nontraditional-student services
- On-campus dining
- On-campus housing
- Orientation
- Recreational sports
- Registrar
- Spirituality, spiritual-life, campus ministry
- Student affairs assessment
- Student affairs fundraising and development
- Student affairs research and evaluation
- Student conduct (Academic)
- Student conduct (Behavioral Case management)
- Student media
- TRIO/Educational opportunity
- University colleges
- Veteran's services
- Wellness programs
- Women's center
- Work-Integrated Learning

Departments in Student Affairs may overlap or combine multiple functional areas into one office, especially at smaller institutions. Some departments can include:

=== Academic services ===
- Academic advising: Student academic services related to course selection, finding a major, study skills, and referrals to tutoring and academic success skills
- Student success/Academic support services: Intensive tutoring and academic success skill interventions with academic subjects such as math, business, or science as well as academic rigors such as essay writing, exam preparation, note-taking, reading, time management, and other academic subjects. Also see Writing center.
- Assessment and research: Focused on assessment, program evaluation, and research implementation in student services and other academic departments for both accreditation and continual improvement of student services and academic departments
- English language institutes: units that support students in developing their English language skills and competence through a combination of curricular and co-curricular programming.
- Higher Education Opportunity Programs (HEOP)/Summer Bridge: Programs designed to support low-income, first-generation students, including students of color, in intensive academic advising and support either in the summer prior to enrollment and during the regular school year to increase graduation rates and close the attainment gap for poor/working class students and students of color

=== Admissions, enrollment, financial aid, orientation ===
- Admissions: Recruitment of undergraduate and graduate students (often separate offices) from first point-of-contact such as high school visits or college fairs to answering student and family admissions questions, to monitoring submission of applications, to reading applications and making admissions decision recommendations in collaboration with faculty
- Enrollment management: Relates to all aspects of incoming students and services provided to them; may include Financial Aid, Bursar, and Registrar.
- Financial aid: Assists students in post-secondary education affordability including information on the difference between grants, scholarships, work-study, and loans; processing federal and state/provincial government aid, payment plans; minimizing debt and understanding why student loans cannot be discharged; the benefits of federal versus private loans; loan repayment plans and employers/careers that will reimburse tuition and/or pay off student loans
- Orientation and First-Year Experience: Support and programming for first-year and transfer students, usually includes orientation and may include family relations

=== Alumni and advancement/development ===
- Alumni services: Focuses on graduated students' interests, needs, activities, and information, as well as fundraising
- Development/Advancement services: Development or advancement of the college/university mission through fund-raising including capital campaigns and lobbying work with legislatures in public colleges and universities to provide greater support for public education
- Student Alumni Associations play a major role in many Alumni Services teams. These Associations typically aim to bring together current students with alumni through a variety of programming. Programming may address a variety of topics including the career journey, networking, building personal and professional skills, and building affinity to the school. Members of the Student Alumni Association act as representatives of their school at these events. Student Alumni Association programming is usually open for part-time and full-time students.
  - Student Alumni Associations usually fall under the Alumni and Development Teams. This is because there is often an aspect of building and promoting a culture of philanthropy within these Associations. Running a "Graduating Class Gifts" program. Many Universities across Canada (example Wilfird Lauier University, Concordia University, University of Northern British Columbia, Schulich School of Business at York University). Although there is a growing trend of having Student Alumni Associations, they are not found at many post-secondary institutions.

=== Athletics and recreation ===
- Athletics: Includes student services for student athletes in intercollegiate athletics including advising, monitoring, and support of student scholarships and student academic, career, and personal-social development
- Campus Recreation encompasses a variety of programs including organized activities such as dance classes, group fitness classes, intramural sport leagues, sports clubs, indoor rock climbing, and outdoor activities for promoting wellness. In recreation or fitness centres other casual or drop-in recreation activities include weight rooms, pools, exercise equipment, and noncredit classes. Participation in campus recreation has been positively correlated with student recruitment and retention, and academic success. The National Intramural and Recreation Sports Association (NIRSA) is a governing body for collegiate recreation both in the United States and Canada. The association's main goal is to support recreational leaders, and promote wellness.

=== Campus life ===
- Campus safety: May be law enforcement officers or other security personnel who provide intervention and prevention for campus crime including annual campus crime reporting and campus programs for public safety
- Community Service: Engages students in on- and off-campus community service and experiential learning opportunities such as service learning
- Commuter/Off-campus student services: Provides services for students living off-campus including social programs, transitions, transportation, housing, and dining options
- Greek affairs: Advises governing councils and recruitment and leadership programs for new and initiated members
- Leadership & Student Engagement: Leadership opportunities for students attending higher education provide valuable learning in areas other than academics. Outreach programs within the institution's community have historically shown to benefit the students, school, and community by building a mutually engaged relationship When a student is engaged in their institution and community, it can enhance their learning experiences, broaden academic thinking, and promote creativity One way to implement leadership and engagement for students might include partnering with faculty to involve students in research initiatives. In addition, students may join the institutional student government. These organizations are largely made up of student leaders who represent the student body, and advocate to the school, community, and local government regarding issues facing the current student population. Student affairs professionals can assist students in locating leadership opportunities within the school or community that match their interests, and facilitate the recording of co-curricular records sometimes referred to as a list of extra-curricular activities. Students can then graduate from their respective programs with more than academic credentials. Co-curricular records demonstrate a student's involvement, successes, and learning moments outside the classroom, which may serve as additional merits when applying to the workforce, thus, improving student likelihood of securing employment within the community
- Student activities: Provides co-curricular programming and advises student organizations and student government; may include Student Activity Board, student government, and student activity fee disbursement
- Union/Student center: Operates the student activities center/facility and may include food services/catering or other auxiliary services.
- Students' Unions: Provides social, organizational activities, representation, and academic and wellness support of the membership. Students' Union staff work in the same capacity as many student affairs professionals but typically not directly for the institution itself.
- Veteran's affairs: Provides programs and support for Armed Forces members who have returned to college.

=== Counselling, health, and wellness ===
Counseling center: Provides individual, group and sometimes couple/family counseling, consultation, crisis, and prevention/intervention services for academic, career, and social/emotional/mental health issues by licensed mental health counselors, social workers, psychologists, and psychiatrists

Counselling Services on campus provides students with support through personal or academic challenges. Counselling Services offers individual and group counselling to support those students who need to work through their challenges, which affect their ability to succeed in school or other parts of their lives. Counselling Services falls under Student Wellness at many campuses. Providing both students and staff with services and resources to facilitate improved mental health well-being. Counselling services can be utilized for personal, academic, as well as counselling staff.

Students in Canadian post-secondary seek advice for the following top reasons: relationship concerns, anxiety/ stress, depression/grief, academic, and career. There has been an increase in psychopathology among students attending universities and colleges in Canada. Research suggests the explanation behind increased appointments with counsellors are due to the high population of international students and mature students. The increasing number of students who have financial debt, students who have pre-existing mental health issues, shortage of institutional resources, the increase of accepting treatment, and the valued support among counsellors are the reason for increased appointments.

Atmosphere: Most Counselling Services offices will encourage a respectful, safe, and affirming atmosphere for students. Offices will support inclusiveness for marginalized populations or minority-seeking groups, including students of all races, ability, ethnicity, sexual orientation, gender identity, religion, age, culture and socioeconomic status.

How? Depending on the institution, counselling services can be booked via online booking, in-person booking, or walk-in hours.

Types of Supports:

- Individual Support
- Seminar and Workshops
- Online Resources, see also Online Counseling
- Physical Resources
- 24/7 Help Lines

Where: Counseling services occur in a private and confidential setting. Counselling can take place in many different situations, such as in a quiet office space, a casual walk, dining hall, a phone call, or a video chat.

Average Appointment Time: 45–60 minutes.

Length of Treatment: Therapy can last a few sessions, several weeks, or years. There is no simple answer on how long therapy will take to feel better because each encounter with a counsellor is individualized.

Types of Counselling: Counselling services can be utilized for many aspects, including personal, career, academic, group, or faculty/staff.

- Personal Counseling: Personal counselling deals with stress, losses, complex relationships, isolation of individuals or depression.
- Career Counselling: Career counselling looks at individuals’ career exploration, change, or personal development. The goal of the counsellor is to guide individuals into a career that is suited to their aptitude, personality, interest and skills. Also, see Career counseling.
- Academic Counselling: Academic Counselling assist individuals obtain effective and efficient study skills so that students can be successful in their respective courses.
- Group Counselling: Group counselling provides a supportive environment to discuss problems and concerns of individuals experiencing similar issues.
- Faculty/Staff Counselling: Faculty and staff working with students may require assistance when supporting students in distress, and supporting withdrawn or isolated students. This counselling also focuses on communication difficulties, language barriers, or cultural norms. See also Employee Assistance Program
- Health services: Provides medical and/or mental health care, counseling, and consultation, and public health education for individuals and groups
- Wellness education: Provides services and information on personal wellness including anti-violence education, alcohol and other drug abuse and prevention, nutrition, and finances. Also see: Health promotion in higher education

=== Career and employment services ===
Evolving over decades, the purpose and approach of career and employment services in the landscape of Canadian higher education has progressed from roots in a post-Second World War era “when campuses responded to a national need to assist returning veterans make a successful transition to civilian life” to a requirement of the service to respond swiftly to a modern time marked by technological advances, cultural revolution, and internationalization. Typical career centers in Canadian higher education concentrate on student career development from the outset of one's entry into a program through to graduation by providing support in areas such as:

- Employment and career counseling
- Résumé preparation
- Interview skills
- Career planning
- Navigating the world of work

Some career centers also provide ongoing support, resources, and programming for alumni populations.

There are three common service delivery models influencing the placement of career and employment services in a post-secondary institution's Student Affairs and Services offering: the centralized, decentralized, and hybrid models of service delivery. The centralized model provides the same menu of services to every student regardless of faculty (i.e. school-wide) contrasting the decentralized model which places focus on individual faculties or schools providing independent support to individual students enrolled in that faculty's programs (i.e. faculty-wide). The third hybrid model "features some centralized career services, such as graduate recruitment, but with faculties maintaining their own career centres".

Robert Shea has identified four areas for career and employment services departments to remain cognizant of in the future: experiential learning, new technologies, changing student populations, and research and accountability.

i. Experiential learning

Having gained increased focus within the post-secondary landscape, “concepts of experiential learning, work-integrated learning, alternative education, practice-oriented education, co-operative education, and internships” require astute anticipation, evaluation, and action from career and employment services professionals.

ii. New technologies

Technological advancement introduces the ability to meet students where they are, both academically and physically. Robert Shea explains that the ongoing development of new technology supports “the delivery of future services, such as digital portfolios, sophisticated searches, and distance interviewing”.

iii. Changing student populations

Increasing diversity in cohorts of students including “older-than-average students, single parents, students of color, international students, Aboriginal and First Nations students, part-time students who are full-time workers, distance students, and students with physical and emotional disabilities” present both opportunities and challenges for career and employment services professionals.

iv. Research and accountability

Little data or literature exists on the impact of career and employment services programming in the Canadian post-secondary landscape including “outcomes of career centre interventions or the effect of work-related factors on student retention”. Improvements in this area can “offer compelling evidence for the efficacy of what career and employment services has to offer on campus”.

=== Experiential Education ===
Experiential education is a philosophy centred around learning through direct experience and reflection. The goal of experiential learning is to provide hands-on practical learning experiences that enriches a student’s learning in their academic courses The Association of Experiential Education believes that learning takes place when “carefully chosen experiences are supported by reflecting, critical analysis and synthesis”. In 70's David Kolb developed the Experiential Learning Model (ELM) and popularized the idea of integrating experiential education with academic programs. As experiential education becomes more common amongst higher education institutions, a broad variety of learning opportunities is offered to students including but not limited to:

- Applied Research projects
- Community Research Projects
- Cooperative Education
- Field Work
- Internships
- Practicum or Placements
- Service Learning
- Study Abroad Opportunities

While many institutions are providing student support for Co-operative Education, Career Success and Experiential Learning in one department, other have these units spread out across different departments and faculties. These services are staffed by student facing Co-op Consultants, employer relations Co-op Consultants, International experience consultants, Career Consultants and Employment Resource staff. Although similar to the Career and employment services divisions that some institutions provide through their student affairs, most Canadian colleges and universities are keeping these services as an exclusive department linked to credit bearing program requirements. As many of these opportunities are linked to credit bearing program requirements, there is debate as to whether experiential education lies in the realm of student affairs or academics.

=== Disability Services ===
Canada

Academic accommodation for students with disabilities is an essential student affairs service that provides students with temporary or permanent disabilities with access to accommodations that remove barriers and allow opportunities for equal participation. Universities and colleges within Canada and specifically in Ontario are required to provide services to students with permanent or temporary disabilities to enable equal opportunity to education. This right to access education is pursuant to the Canadian Charter of Rights and Freedoms, the Accessibility for Ontarians with Disabilities Act (AODA), and the Ontario Human Rights Code (OHRC) to the point of undue hardship. In response to this need, both community colleges and universities established an office to oversee and implement academic accommodation support services for students with disabilities. A student entering post-secondary education must register with Offices for Persons with Disabilities to obtain academic accommodations. Many post-secondary institutions use the terms 'disability' or 'accessibility' in their department title, however, the latter is becoming used more often to highlight the need for a change in environment rather than the need for the student to adapt. Post-secondary institutions provide academic support to the following disability groups:

United States of America In the U.S., disability support services commonly (a) provides accommodations and advocacy for students with developmental, emotional, intellectual, learning, and physical disabilities and (b) advocates for policies and services relating to accessibility and compliance with the Americans with Disabilities Act of 1990.

=== Diversity and inclusion ===
- International student services/study abroad programs: Assists and supports international students who are not citizens with visas, homesickness, linguistic and cultural transitions, and can include programs for citizens who seek Study or Education Abroad programs
- Multicultural services: Provides support and programs to create an environment of respect and affirmation for students and staff of multiple cultural identities; may include African and African American, Asian/Pacific Islander, Latino/a, Native American Indian, and Multiracial Student services, programs, and supports; a Women's Center, programs, and supports, and a Lesbian, Gay, Bisexual and Transgender Center, programs, and supports
- Spirituality, faith-based, and religious services: Provides a variety of supports for a range of belief systems at both public and independent institutions

=== Multicultural Services ===
Multicultural student services aim to support students, student affairs professionals and faculty in higher education, frequently those who are underrepresented. Services offered by multicultural services include coordinating events of cultural heritage and expression, uniting students to community resources, and helping marginalized students find success on campus.

Larger institutions might have decentralized services where its own office and programs serve each group of underrepresented students. Women and LGBT students are sometimes included in multicultural student services functional areas but may be served by others.

=== On-campus Dining ===
On-campus Dining options vary based on campus, and institution. Major chains may have locations on university campuses, but there can also be more local food options specific to that campus as well. In some cases there are student cafes and restaurants run by the student union of that institution. Institutions will often have some kind of Meal Plan option that students can pay into through student fees; this provides some additional ease when purchasing food and perhaps discounts as well. In some cases, partnership are made with external restaurants and dining spots to provide students with discounted prices as well.

=== Residence programs ===
Residence programs provide housing, programming, and academic and personal/social support including resident assistants/hall directors for on-campus undergraduate and graduate residents living in traditional residence halls, suites, or apartments, and may include food services. Residence programs focus on supporting student transition to post-secondary and on integrating students into the broader institutional community. Residence programs can be split by functional units which are focused on managing different aspects of student housing. Some of the functional units that can be found within residence programs include:

Residence Life

Aims to provide more than just a space for students to reside - the focus of residence life programs is on community integration both within the context of the housing operation and within the context of the institution. Residence life units seek to create a connection between students and the institution, where students feel they belong and are more likely to find success in their studies. Residence Life often also oversees student conduct and responds to breaches of Residence Hall Agreements or Community Standards.

Residence Education

Acknowledged as a separate functional unit at some institutions, residence education focuses on the development and implementation of intentional learning experiences for students to engage in. Residence education units focus on developing learning experiences that support the student life cycle and student retention/persistence to graduation. Some examples of priorities for residence education units include time management skills, study skills, career planning, healthy eating & sleeping habits, etc.

Residence Admissions/Administration

Responsible for the overall administrative management of housing operation. This unit of housing operations is often responsible for processing residence applications, managing the residence placement process, managing the customer service component of housing operation, and overall financial management of the housing operation.

Residence Facilities/Facility Operations

Responsible for maintenance and upkeep of residence spaces including damage to infrastructure, wear endured over time, and ongoing maintenance of spaces including restrooms, common lounges, lobbies, etc.

Food Services

May be auxiliary or part of the student Union and includes meal plans, meal plan options, campus restaurants, and catering services for student events

=== Student Conduct ===
Student conduct, judicial affairs, and/or academic integrity offices are typically coordinated by student affairs professionals, with a focus on promoting student success through the prevention and sanctioning of academic and/or non-academic misconduct. Judicial affairs or student conduct offices enforce community standards and campus codes of conduct, which may include ethical and legal programs/education, conflict resolution or mediation for academic and behavioural student concerns, investigative response to campus sexual violence, threat assessment, and referrals and collaboration with outside police agencies. Student affairs professionals concerned with student conduct are responsible for communicating and enforcing institutional policies and student codes of conduct, investigating allegations of student misconduct, and working with students throughout the resolution process.

The organizational framework for responding to student misconduct varies across institutions, taking a centralized, decentralized, or hybrid approach. Similarly, definitions of student misconduct, the delineation of types of misconduct, and disciplinary processes also vary by institution, though commonalities exist.

There are multiple approaches to conduct processes on campuses, which balance the precedent of conduct administration history and the call to better align with the institutions' educational focus. University and college campuses have a history of balancing the competing responsibility of an educational focus and the emergence of legalism. In the 1960s, a Federal court process in the United States highlighted the first and fourteenth amendment rights of students, which influenced universities to adjust their judicial processes to be legalistic and adversarial.

A key function of all conduct systems is providing a result or expected pathway forward for the student. Depending on campus precedent, history, and the type and severity of the behaviour, processes and outcomes for academic or non-academic misconduct may be punitive, educational, and/or restorative in nature. Punitive sanctions tend to focus on punishment at or to the student, educational and developmental sanctions focus on guiding students to critically reflect on behavior, and restorative sanctions ask students to repair harms through action. A 2014 study by Karp and Sacks identified six developmental goals for college students aged 18–22 to be achieved throughout the conduct process: 1) Just Community/Self-Authorship, 2) Active Accountability, 3) Interpersonal Competence, 4) Social Ties to Institution, 5) Procedural Fairness, and 6) Closure. They found that a restorative and developmental approach to conduct allowed for these learning goals to be met more frequently and consistently, compared to traditional punitive styles. It is becoming widely accepted within the conduct administration field that taking a developmental approach to behavioural concerns decreases the recidivism rates among students and allows students to focus on the harms that have been caused, rather than simply the rule that was broken. With this being said, this is not to completely discount the traditional or 'code' style approach to conduct, which is still effective when a student does not take responsibility for their actions or identify the harms and impacts that their behaviour has caused.

Student affairs professionals working in student judicial affairs and academic integrity are in a unique position to influence a students' moral and ethical development. By responding to student misconduct in a way that is “measured, fair, and appropriate”, student affairs professionals promote the importance of being accountable for misbehavior, while also assisting students in becoming better students, graduates, and members of society. Whether this be express new knowledge of department or institutional policy and expectations, or more introspective moral development and reflection, the goal for any judicial affairs or student conduct officer is to promote learning and development for each student they engage with.

An organization based on the United States, but with international membership, the Association for Student Conduct Administration focuses on conduct administration and best practices on campuses.

== Professional organizations ==
There are numerous professional organizations for student affairs at the national, regional, and international levels. These organizations serve many functions to the profession including, guidance for best practices across the field, professional development and shared learning, research or grants to further service development, and advocacy on current issues that influence professional practice and student life. In addition, many student affairs professionals participate in associations that are either more general (embracing higher education administrators generally) or specific to a particular sub-field such as residence life or student health. At the international level, professional organizations for student affairs include the International Association of Student Affairs and Services, which was established in 2010.

In Canada, the very first association University Advisory Services was established in 1946 which was later called as University Counselling and Placement Association (UCPA) and later on was called Canadian Association of University Students Personnel Services (CAUSPS). In 1973, Canadian Association of College and University Student Services (CACUSS) was founded for student affairs professionals across Canada. In 2015, CACUSS developed various communities and networking groups based on professionals needs' and research interests. Communities and networking groups focusing on multiple students services and resources for student affairs professionals such as aboriginal student services, learning services, advising, community engagement, EDI, and so many more. CACUSS organizes an annual conference, webinars, round-table talks, research presentations, and other professional development opportunities for student affairs professionals across Canadian post-secondary institutions

In Europe, international cooperation among student affairs professionals is facilitated by the European Council for Student Affairs (ECStA), based in Brussels. Founded in 1999, ECStA traces it origins to a series of conferences of student affairs professionals held in the 1990s. ECStA deals with a number of issues that are unique to European higher education, such as ensuring international student mobility within Europe under the Bologna Process.

In the Asia-Pacific region, the major international student affairs organization is the Asia Pacific Student Services Association (APSSA), based in Hong Kong. APSSA was established in 1988, and holds regular staff and student conferences. Countries represented among APSSA member institutions include Australia, China, Indonesia, Japan, Malaysia, Philippines, Singapore, Thailand, and the United States.

In the United States, large organizations include National Association of Student Personnel Administrators (NASPA) and American College Personnel Association (ACPA). NASPA members are committed to serving college students by embracing the core values of diversity, learning, integrity, collaboration, access, service, fellowship, and the spirit of inquiry. NASPA and ACPA published the Principles of Good Practice for Student Affairs in 1997 which build off of those published by Chickering and Gamson (1987). These principles emphasize the profession's core value of promoting services and program delivery that are student-centered and address student needs beyond the academic environment. These principles are not prescriptive and provide guidelines for professionals from varying service areas and institutions to adapt to their unique social, political, and campus contexts while promoting the values of the profession. As well, there are publications that relate to the Student Affairs field such as the Journal of College Student Development and The Chronicle of Higher Education.

In Canada, the CACUSS Student Affairs and Services Competency Model reflects the knowledge, skills, and attitudes of novice through experienced student affairs and services professionals. These competency areas are not specific to individual functional units or services areas and reflect values commonly held by the field of student affairs including shared identity as professional and educator, student-centered and holistic service delivery, and ethical practice.

While large organizations exist, there are smaller organizations and publications that represent various smaller departments or divisions in Student Affairs. For example, in Residence life, university departments have a national organization association called the Association of College and University Housing Officers - International (ACUHO-I). ACUHO-I also publishes a peer-reviewed journal (The Journal of College and University Student Housing) twice a year and publishes a magazine (Talking Stick).

== Criticism ==
Student affairs and services delivery is challenged by contemporary issues and influences both internal and external to the institution. Increasingly diverse student populations, new technologies, political and government influences, and increasing pressure to improve retention and recruitment require flexible and innovative institutional and organizational cultures. The organization, structure, and function of student affairs and services at universities and colleges are criticized as slow to adapt to these changing contexts because institutional cultures emphasize practices rooted in tradition. Further complicating the efficacy of organizational change are the unique subcultures internalized by different functional units that reflect the underlying values, beliefs, and assumptions held by those professionals. As student affairs and services continues to grow, it is difficult to have consensus on the core values across functional areas.

Tension occurs within the field of student affairs and services among different function units and individual practitioners who use a student-centered or institution-focused approach to their work. Differing perceptions by student affairs and services staff towards their institution's approach of supporting student success reflects structures whose cultures are either connected or siloed.

The field of student affairs has been criticized for its emphasis on formal, professional training, calling into question whether the field is theoretical or practical. Complicating this criticism is the question of the role of student development theories in student affairs practice. It is claimed that student development theories are used to “proactively identify and address student needs, design programs, develop policies, and create healthy...environments that encourage positive growth in students.” Yet, student affairs practices often bear little resemblance or connection to student development theories. As Paul Bloland (1979) wrote in an article in the NASPA Journal, “We have cultivated an expertise that was not requested, is not sought out, and for which there is little recognition or demand. Many entry-level and (many) seasoned professionals know little of student development theory and practice and, in fact, do not really need such expertise to meet the role expectations of their supervisors or, in too many instances, their institutions.” Today, theory-to-practice models reflect the necessity to combine foundational theoretical knowledge of student development theories with the functional knowledge gained through professional practice and ongoing reflection.

Unfortunately, there has been relatively little research on the relationship between student affairs professionals (also referred to as staff) and students as compared to that between faculty and students. While early research confirms that staff-student relationships are beneficial to the latter, the insufficient empirical examination of all that this topic encompasses also specifically implies a lack of knowledge on the importance of staff of colour to enhancing the experiences of students of colour, particularly at Predominantly White Institutions (PWIs). Mentors can help students achieve success, and while some research suggests that the racial matching of mentors and mentees is beneficial, this element of the staff-student relationship is often ignored or forgotten.

Despite the emphasis student development theories place on the use of holistic approaches, research has shown that White staff may not take such an approach to mentoring students of colour, instead focusing on academics and taking the controversial “colourblind approach.” This can lead to less meaningful staff-student relationships. Greater conversation and action is required with regard to hiring more staff of colour, why students of colour may not be fully comfortable in all student affairs spaces, and preparing White staff to support students of colour in a more holistic way.

Another debate has centered on the degree to which available postgraduate preparation programs actually represent a distinct discipline. While the field bears a resemblance to psychology, counseling, and other general concentrations, debate and criticism of the field's major foundations are virtually nonexistent in theoretical discourse, calling into question the credibility of the academic underpinning of the field. As Bloland, Stamatakos, and Russell wrote, while student development theory “...has been widely distributed through the literature, in preparation programs, at workshops and conventions,” academics and professionals in the field have, “...failed to exercise their critical faculties to raise questions about student development, to slow down the head-long pace of its engulfment of the field of student affairs, and to examine alternatives and opinions as they presented themselves.”

== See also ==
- American College Personnel Association (ACPA)
- Canadian Association of College and University Student Services (CACUSS)
- Journal of College Student Development
- National Association of Student Personnel Administrators (NASPA)

== Works cited ==
- Barr, M. J.; Desler, M. K. (2000). The Handbook of Student Affairs Administration. San Francisco: Jossey-Bass. ISBN 9781118047606.
- Basinger, J. (2003). More Power for Provosts. The Chronicle of Higher Education.
- Ludeman, Roger B.; et al. (2009). Student Affairs and Services in Higher Education: Global Foundations, Issues and Best Practices (PDF). UNESCO.
- MacKinnon, Fiona J. D. (2004). Rentz's Student Affairs Practice in Higher Education. Charles C Thomas Publisher. ISBN 0398074682.
- NASPA Standards of Professional Practice. NASPA. Retrieved on 2010-10-4.
- Schuh, John H.; Jones, Susan R.; Harper, Shaun R. (2010). Student Services: A Handbook for the Profession. John Wiley & Sons. ISBN 978-0470872154.
