= International student services =

Services provided to international students

International student services are the services, supports and programming available to undergraduate and graduate international students provided by the institution at which they are studying. These services have been developed to meet international students' specific needs during their post-secondary studies and can include: orientation programming, immigration advising, academic and language support, financial aid support, employment services, health and wellness support, residence and housing support, social programming, and post-graduation planning support.

== History ==
=== Canada ===
Student affairs services began to emerge in Canada at the end of the 19th century but it was only with the formation of the University Counselling and Placement Association (UCPA) in 1958 that international student advising was included as a service provided by student affairs professionals.

Students from other countries had been coming to study at colleges and universities in Canada since the late 1800s but increased greatly after World War II, which led to the founding of the national organization Friendly Relations with Overseas Students. There has also recently been an emphasis on "internationalizing" Canadian campuses, leading to more intentional recruitment of international students; with over 95% of Canadian universities including internationalization in their strategic plan. The sociocultural, economic, academic and political benefits of internationalization have been a significant impetus to adopt an internationalization strategy within most Canadian educational institutions.

When the Friendly Relations with Overseas Students was founded, there were 6,000 international students in Canada; by 2017 there were 494,525 international students in Canada, with 370,710 studying in higher education; in 2018, this number has almost doubled to about 721,000 international students. According to the Canadian Bureau for International Education (CBIE), this number has increased to 530, 540 international students studying in Canada at all levels of study in 2020. These students come from all over the world, with the majority coming from India and China. Ontario has the largest number of international students studying across the province following by British Columbia. In 2018, international students in Canada contributed an estimated $21.6 billion to Canada’s GDP and in 2016 supported almost 170,000 jobs for Canada’s middle class.

== Types of International Student Services ==
=== Services provided by the international office ===
Specific international student services are provided by student affairs professionals who often work within the institution's international office or international centre, or by student affairs professionals from other departments (such as career services or wellness centres) who work in tandem with the international office to develop and deliver services for international students.

International centres or offices are often part of the institutions' student affairs or student services department. Institutions with smaller student populations may not have a dedicated international office but should still have student affairs professionals dedicated to working with international students. Canada has developed strategies and programs to support international students. The new initiatives and programs have been introduced to increase services for international students in higher education.

==== Orientation and transition programming ====
It is common for international students to experience culture shock when moving to a new country to participate in higher education. They are often met with having to adjust to new cultural norms of the country as well as a new academic setting. Orientation and transition programming allows international student to adjust to their new surroundings and begin meeting their classmates. Orientation and transition programming can include:

- Online resources: Institutional websites with extensive information for international students, emailing pre-arrival information to students before they arrive on campus and webinar programs
- Engagement on arrival: Assist new international students with any immediate needs or concerns, provide transportation or greeting services at the airport, help them settle in with their new surroundings and provide opportunities to meet new people and make friends
- In-person orientation programming: institutions may create orientation programming specific to international students to provide them with information regarding immigration, course registration, student life, and other logistics associated with moving to a new country (e.g., setting up bank accounts, transportation, tenancy information etc.)
- Continued support: Follow-up sessions throughout the year that cover topics such as academics, study skills and cultural adjustment, mentorship programming

It is important that all information provided during orientation and transition programming is presented in a way that is easy for international students to absorb and understand. Newly arrived international students may be tired and experiencing jet lag, and too much information provided too quickly can cause them to feel stressed and overwhelmed.

==== Immigration advising ====
Immigration advising for international students includes advising on:

- Study permit applications and renewals
- Permits allowing students to work in the country where the student is studying, both during their time as a student and after graduation
- Documentation and paperwork required for travel within the country where the student is studying as well as to other countries

In Canada, advisors who provide immigration advising to international students are required to be certified as a Regulated International Student Immigration Advisor (RISIA) or a Regulated Canadian Immigration Consultant (RCIC).

==== Academic and language support ====
International students can experience academic challenges if they are studying in a country where the language of instruction is not the student's first language or when the classroom style is different from the student's home country.

==== Post-graduation planning support ====
After graduation, international students can return to their home country. However, they may also want to stay in the country where they are studying, to work and become a permanent resident or to continue their education. These options require additional immigration permits and international student services can provide information and support on:

- How and when students can apply for a post-graduate work permit
- Becoming a permanent resident of the country in which the student is studying
- Continued education, such as postgraduate education or additional undergraduate studies at a different institution

=== Social and Cultural Programming ===
It is important that social and cultural programming for international students involve both international and domestic students, which can be achieved through collaborations between the international office and other student services departments at the institution. Often, the international office will take the lead role in these collaborations. The international office will also take the lead role in peer-to-peer programs for international students, which help international students to adjust to their new academic setting and build their interpersonal skills.

=== Services Provided by Other Student Services Offices ===
International students have similar needs as domestic students so they will seek services from departments and offices outside of the international office. However, due to the fact that international students are not always considered in the creation or implementation of these services, international students can experience additional challenges with these services. These services and challenges can include:

- Health and wellness support
- Academic Learning Services
  - Some international students struggle with language barrier and hence feel homesick and lonely which hinders their ability to excel in academics. Also, adjusting into a new academic environment also increases their stress and it takes much longer time to adjust into a campus culture and in a new country as well. That is why there are English language courses and classes for international students to learn English and build confidence to make friends. Subsequently, language support programs helps international students to be successful in academics and in their professional career as well.
- Residence and housing support
  - Many international students need to arrange temporary accommodations upon their arrival, such as staying in a hotel. Because of this they need to find their long-term accommodations quickly, potentially leading to situations of international students finding unsuitable housing, or being unable to find housing that fits into financial constraints created by high tuition costs and work limitations. Information about housing processes and costs are not as readily available to international students, creating additional challenges when deciding on housing options.
  - International students stay in residence and on-campus housing, but due to high costs associated with this or many international students being mature students they may seek out off-campus housing or homestay options.
- Financial aid
  - Due to the higher cost of tuition that international students have to pay, many institutions offer a variety of bursaries, loans, scholarships and emergency funds and services. However, international students face challenges due to not always qualifying for domestic student scholarships or government loans.
- Employment services and support
  - Visa conditions often limit international students' ability to find off-campus work. They also often find themselves competing with domestic students for similar jobs. Overall, a lack of support and resources has been identified when it comes to international student employment
- Religious services
- LGBTQ services and support
- The students' union or student government organization
- Campus & Community Food banks and food security services
  - Due to the financial barriers often experienced due to higher tuition fees, international students may need to utilize these services during their studies. The cost of food in Canada is not always clear when students move for their studies, so it is not always able to be budgeted for properly.

== Professional Organizations ==
=== Canada ===
The Canadian Bureau for International Education (CBIE) organization was incorporated in 1966. However, the organization was developed as Friendly Relations with Overseas Students (FROS) in late 1940's. CBIE is a Canadian education service provider that provides professional development and project management services for student affairs professionals working in international education. CBIE also provides scholarship management and research services as well as acts as knowledge hub for professional publications. Additionally, their scholarship platform consists of a variety of different programs which brings educators, internationally trained professionals, and international students from across the world to bring equity, diversity, and inclusivity to Canadian education environment.

The Canadian Association of College and University Student Services (CACUSS) is a non-profit professional organization for student affairs professionals working at Canadian higher education institutions. CACUSS is a non-profit, membership based organization which focuses on research, leadership, and professional development opportunities for student affairs professionals to serve students. CACUSS also has a community of student affairs professionals who work for international students to improve services for them. One of the CACUSS's community and network group is called Internationalization in Student Affairs which focuses on supporting international students across Canadian higher education. Internationalization in Student Affairs also have regular events and activities which addresses internationalization challenges and equip student affairs professionals to develop approaches and programming to support international students. On the federal level Global Affairs Canada, Employment and Social Development Canada, and Immigration, Refugees and Citizenship Canada play a leadership role in shaping the policies that drives the international education strategy in Canada. On the provincial and territorial level, the Ministry of Education and other educational institutional stakeholders lead the organization and delivery of educational policies and strategies.
