= Elizabeth G. Creamer =

American educational researcher

- Occupations: Educational research methodologist, author, and academic

Academic background
- Education: B.S. English Education; M.Ed. Reading Education; Ed.D. Higher Education and Community College Education
- Alma mater: Northwestern University; Colorado State University; Virginia Tech

Elizabeth G. Creamer is an American educational research methodologist, author, and academic. She serves as a professor emerita of Educational Research and Evaluation at the Department of Educational Leadership and Policy Studies in the College of Liberal Arts and Human Sciences at Virginia Tech (VT).

Creamer's research interests span the humanities and social sciences with a specific focus on advancing the mixed methods field through the integration of grounded theory and mixed methods into a methodology tailored for intervention and evaluation research. She is the author of three books about mixed methods: An Introduction to Fully Integrated Mixed Methods Research, Advancing Grounded Theory with Mixed Methods, and Visual Displays in Qualitative and Mixed Methods Research. She was the editor of Reconfiguring the Firewall: Recruiting Women to Information Technology across Cultures and Continents and Development and Assessment of Self-Authorship. She is the recipient of the Excellence in Outreach Award and Betty Vetter Research Award.

== Education and early career ==
Creamer graduated from Rumson Fair Haven Regional High School in New Jersey in 1967 and earned her B.S. in English Education from Northwestern University in 1970. Following this, she served as a High School Teacher at Rocky Mountain High School in Colorado from 1973 to 1976, subsequently pursuing an M.Ed. in Reading Education from Colorado State University in 1974. In 1981, she joined VT as a Reading and Study Skills Counselor then moved to an administrative position as assistant director of Financial Aid while concurrently completing her Ed.D. in Higher Education and Community College Education from the same institution in 1983.

== Career ==
Creamer has been a faculty member at VT for over 38 years. In 1985, she became an Adjunct Faculty Member in the Higher Education and Student Affairs Program within the College of Human Resources and Education where she served until 1994. She was an associate professor of Interdisciplinary Studies from 1995 to 2001 before moving to the School of Education, where she was later promoted to the rank of Professor in 2006. Since 2006, she has held the title of professor emerita in Educational Research and Evaluation at VT.

Creamer served as Director of the Interdisciplinary Studies Program from 1988 to 2002. Since 2009, she has been an Associate Member of the Mixed Methods Program at UMich.

== Works ==
Creamer's first book, Assessing Faculty Productivity: Issues of Equity (1998) deconstructed elements of the academic reward structure that disadvantage women. It drew international notice following an interview that was included in a featured article in the Chronicle of Higher Education in September 1998, Why Don’t Women Publish as Much as Men? She authored An Introduction to Fully Integrated Mixed Methods Research which emphasized the benefits of integrating qualitative and quantitative strands throughout the research process. Greg P. Griffin praised the work saying that "Creamer's book may be the most cogent approach to mixed methods research available." Her 2021 book, Advancing Grounded Theory with Mixed Methods provided insights into developing a multi-faceted analytical framework in social and behavioral sciences. Gregory Hadley in his review for the Journal of Mixed Methods Research, stated that "By studying over sixty real-life exemplars the author clarifies the current murky nature of MM-GTM".

Creamer edited the volume Reconfiguring the Firewall: Recruiting Women to Information Technology across Cultures and Continents, discussing the global challenge of increasing women's participation in IT fields. She also edited Development and Assessment of Self-Authorship, which offered a comprehensive exploration of self-authorship across cultures and emphasized the interplay between personal characteristics and contextual influences. Michael G. Ignelzi, in his review for the Journal of College Student Development, noted how "the book presents the most current theoretical understandings and research on self-authorship."

== Research ==
Over the span of her career, Creamer has focused her research on methodology, mixed methods, grounded theory, faculty research productivity, faculty collaboration, women's advancement in STEM fields, and cognitive development. She has contributed to teaching and advising assignments in research methods, higher education, and women's studies, while participating in conferences and authoring peer-reviewed journal articles.

Creamer alongside Anne Laughlin, investigated how women interpret contradictory career-related experiences utilizing interviews with 40 college women to confirm the link between self-authorship and career decision-making. The study emphasized the role of inter-connectivity, particularly involving parents, in women's decision-making processes, suggesting that students may reject career advice requiring cognitive complexity. She examined gender differences in undergraduate engineering students by using a mixed methods approach across nine institutions, finding that satisfaction with the engineering major doesn't necessarily align with future career aspirations, especially among women. Additionally, her work on evaluating initiatives aimed at fostering self-authorship growth introduced a measure of self-authorship by assessing three phases in its development.

Creamer's research on translating developmental theory into academic advising practice emphasized enhancing routine interactions for student learning and personal development addressing advisors' challenges in balancing diverse guidance sources. She also examined how long-term collaborators negotiate their differences by studying the strategies employed by coauthors who have worked together for ten or more years underscoring the value of genuine engagement in fostering innovative knowledge.

== Awards and honors ==
- 2007 – Excellence in Outreach Award, Virginia Tech College of Liberal Arts and Human Sciences
- 2010 – Betty Vetter Research Award, Women in Engineering ProActive Network

== Bibliography ==
=== Selected books ===
- Reconfiguring the Firewall: Recruiting Women to Information Technology across Cultures and Continents (2007) ISBN 978-1568813141
- Development and Assessment of Self-Authorship (2010) ISBN 978-1579223687
- An Introduction to Fully Integrated Mixed Methods Research (2017) ISBN 978-1483350936
- Advancing Grounded Theory with Mixed Methods (2021) ISBN 978-0367174804

=== Selected articles ===
- Creamer, D. G., & Creamer, E. G. (1994). Practicing developmental advising: Theoretical contexts and functional applications. NACADA Journal, 14(2), 17–24.
- Creamer, E. G. (2004). Collaborators' attitudes about differences of opinion. The Journal of Higher Education, 75(5), 556–571.
- Creamer, E. G., & Laughlin, A. (2005). Self-authorship and women's career decision making. Journal of college student development, 46(1), 13–27.
- Amelink, C. T., & Creamer, E. G. (2010). Gender differences in elements of the undergraduate experience that influence satisfaction with the engineering major and the intent to pursue engineering as a career. Journal of Engineering Education, 99(1), 81–92.
- Creamer, E. G., Magolda, M. B., & Yue, J. (2010). Preliminary evidence of the reliability and validity of a quantitative measure of self-authorship. Journal of College Student Development, 51(5), 550–562.
