= Health promotion in higher education =

In the higher education setting, the process of health promotion is applied within a post-secondary academic environments to increase health and wellbeing. The process needs professionals to engage in all five WHO Ottawa Charter Health Promotion Actions and particularly reorient all the sectors of a college campus towards evidence-based prevention, utilizing a public health/population health /community health model. Health promotion requires a coordinated effort in all five Actions:

1. Building healthy public policy
2. Creating supportive environments
3. Strengthening community action
4. Developing personal skills
5. Re-orienting all service sectors toward prevention of illness and promotion of health

== Internationally ==
The International Health Promoting Universities & Colleges Network is guided by the Okanagan Charter: An International Charter for Health Promoting University and Colleges, which calls on post-secondary schools to embed health into all aspects of campus culture and to lead health promotion action and collaboration locally and globally. Created in June 2015, the Charter provides institutions with a common language, principles, and framework to become health and wellbeing promoting campuses.

== In Canada ==
The "National Standard of Canada for Mental Health and Well-Being for Post-Secondary Students" was developed in 2018 and is a voluntary guideline to help post-secondary institutions support the mental health and well-being of students, including the promotion of mental health and well-being. The Standard aims to support the following key outcomes:

- Raise awareness about mental health and decrease mental illness-related stigma,
- Provide healthier and safer institutional environments,
- Improve opportunities for student success and flourishing, and
- Promote life and resiliency skills that students can use at school, at work, and in daily life

The Canadian Association of College & University Student Services (CACUSS) co-developed the Post-Secondary Student Mental Health: Guide to a Systemic Approach with the Canadian Mental Health Association. This guide aims to act as a resource and a framework to support the creation of communities on campus that are conducive to transformative learning and mental well-being through a systemic approach. CACUSS also includes several communities and networks dedicated to health promotion in higher education including campus mental health, student health & wellness, and student peer support programs.

In Ontario, many post-secondary institutions belong to the Ontario University & College Health Association (OUCHA) which allow them to share best practices for health services and promotion across institutions. OUCHA works to develop and pursue all which will preserve and improve the health of University and College students and their community. The overall goal of the organization is to promote and ensure optimum health services to the student population while also providing effective health education in both prevention and management of health issues.

All post-secondary institutions in Ontario also have access to the Centre for Innovation in Campus Mental Health (CICMH), which seeks to support post-secondary institutions in Ontario in their commitment to student mental health. CICMH works with institutions to build knowledge and skills of institutions, foster innovation in collaborative response, and develop partnerships to leverage community knowledge in order to address the mental health needs of students.

== In the United States ==
Developing personal skills is currently the action most often used in the higher education setting. These Health Educators or Health Education departments can exist in one or multiple sectors simultaneously throughout the institution, offering skill building initiatives like health communication campaigns or educational workshops to prevent chronic diseases, stress, anxiety, depression, addictions, suicide, grief, hazing, personal safety, bike safety as well as alcohol, tobacco, and other drugs misuse. Health Education departments often offer other initiatives to enhance sexual health, nutrition, stress management, consent, mindfulness, and healthy relationships. A common methodology for personal skills development initiatives is peer health education.

The National Commission for Health Education Credentialing (NCHEC) works to improve the practice of health education and to serve the public and profession of health education by certifying health education specialists (also known as the CHES credential), which promotes professional and career development of health care education, preparation, and practice, all ideals thought to promote the delivery of health care. NCHEC develops and administers the CHES exam in the United States, a competency-based test for health education specialists. The CHES credential is renewable every five years, requiring a baseline of continuing education credits for recertification. This is akin to the requirements and practices of many other health professions, including physicians (ACCME), pharmacists (ACPE), and nurses (ANCC).

The American College Health Association Standards of Practice for Health Promotion in Higher Education first published in 2001 provides measurable guidelines for enhancing the quality of health promotion overall while guiding health education, prevention and wellness efforts at colleges and universities.

The Council for the Advancement of Standards in Higher Education creates and delivers a Book of Professional Standards and Guidelines and Self-Assessment Guides that are designed to lead to a host of quality-controlled programs and services and promotes standards in student affairs, student services, and student development programs for the ultimate purpose of fostering and enhancing student learning, development, and achievement and in general to promote good citizenship. CAS updated all functional area standards, including CAS for Health Promotion in Higher Education in 2012.

By 2021 the first eight institutions had adopted the Okanagan Charter: An International Charter for Health Promoting University and Colleges, and became the foundation for dozens more to create the U.S. Health Promoting Campuses Network. The ultimate goal of the network is to guide and support campuses, as they navigate the process to adopt the Okanagan Charter as an aspirational document to guide their campus wellbeing efforts from a comprehensive and systems level approach.

== See also ==
- College health
