= Association for Student Conduct Administration =

Organizations based in Texas

- Abbreviation: ASCA
- Formation: 1987
- Founder: Donald D. Gehring
- Type: Educational association
- Headquarters: Washington, D.C.
- Coordinates: 38.9072°N 77.0369°W
- Fields: Student affairs, student conduct, conflict resolution
- Members: 2650 (2025)
- Executive Director: Tess Barker, JD, PhD
- President: JaWana Green
- President-Elect: Brian Glick
- Past-President: Christina Liang
- Affiliations: Council of Higher Education Management Associations (CHEMA)
- Staff: 4 (2023)
- Website: theasca.org
- Formerly called: Association for Student Judicial Affairs (ASJA) (1987–2008)

The Association for Student Conduct Administration (ASCA), formerly the Association for Student Judicial Affairs, is the leading voice for student conduct administration within higher education, conflict resolution, law and public policy related to student conduct administration. ASCA also attracts members who work in higher education prevention education and Title IX administrators in the United States. Founded in 1987, ASCA has over 2,650 active members at over 860 institutions across the US, Canada, and abroad. ASCA's headquarters resided on the campus of Texas A&M University in College Station, Texas until 2018, when its operations moved fully remote. In 2025, ASCA began the process to formally move its headquarters to Washington, D.C.

== Mission ==
The mission statement of ASCA is to support higher education professionals by providing education materials and resources, intentional professional development opportunities and a network of colleagues to facilitate best practices of student conduct administration and conflict resolution on college and university campuses.

== History ==
The creation of the Association for Student Judicial Affairs was proposed by Donald D. Gehring of the University of Louisville during conversations with colleagues at the Stetson University Law and Higher Education Conference. ASJA officially came to form in 1987 with the creation of a steering committee and funding support from Raymond Goldstone at the University of California, Los Angeles.

ASJA held its first annual conference in 1989 and began the annual Donald D. Gehring Academy for Student Conduct Administration in 1993. In 2008, ASJA changed its name to the Association for Student Conduct Administration (ASCA). In 2015, ASCA opened a satellite office in Washington, D.C., in collaboration with the American College Personnel Association, to facilitate more interaction with other higher education professional associations and to assist public policy advocacy efforts.

== Professional development ==
ASCA produces several national professional development programs each year, including an annual conference, the Donald D. Gehring Academy for Student Conduct Administration, a Title IX and Sexual Misconduct Institute, as well as national collaborations with other professional associations such as NASPA, the Association of Fraternity Advisors, and the National Association for Campus Activities.

== Structure, Committees, and Communities of Practice ==
ASCA is organizationally divided into thirteen geographic regions administered by regional chairs. The association sponsors committees and communities of practice on topics such as conflict resolution, research, academic integrity, assessment, community colleges, fraternity and sorority life, public policy and legislative issues, mental health, threat assessment and sexual assault.

== Advocacy efforts ==
After the release of the Department of Education's Office for Civil Rights (OCR) "Dear Colleague Letter" discussing Title IX and campus sexual assault in April 2011, ASCA leadership and publications were frequently cited in the national media to discuss topics related to sexual assault response. ASCA has voiced support for the OCR-required preponderance of the evidence standard in campus sexual assault adjudications, mandatory academic transcript notation for serious disciplinary matters, and advocacy for institutionally-based discipline processes.

ASCA has received criticism from popular media outlets Huffington Post and Jezebel for a perceived focus on educational outcomes in campus sexual assault adjudication. ASCA responded to those concerns with the publication of a "Gold Standard" report on sexual assault adjudication practices.

== Raymond H Goldstone ASCA Foundation ==
The Raymond H Goldstone ASCA Foundation provides funds for scholarships to ASCA professional development opportunities such as the annual conference or Gehring Academy.
