= College health =

Health of individuals enrolled in college

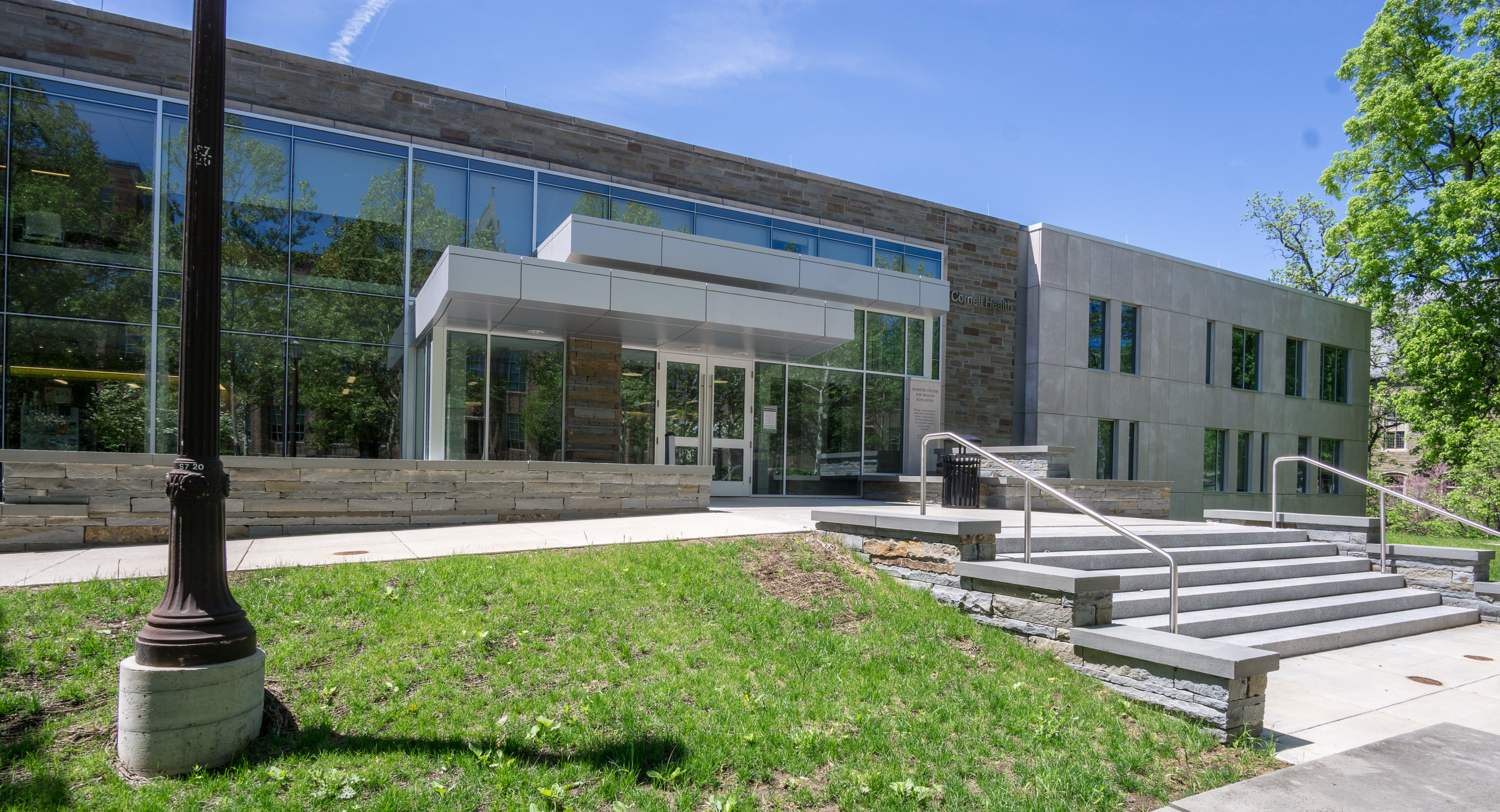
Skorton Center for Health Initiatives at Cornell University

College health is a desired outcome created by a constellation of services, programs and policies directed at advancing the health and wellbeing of individuals enrolled in an institution of higher education, while also addressing and improving both population health and community health. Many colleges and universities worldwide apply both health promotion and health care as processes to achieve key performance indicators in college health. The variety of healthcare services provided by any one institution range from first aid stations employing a single nurse to large, accredited, multi-specialty ambulatory healthcare clinics with hundreds of employees. These services, programs and policies require a multidisciplinary team, the healthcare services alone include physicians, physician assistants, administrators, nurses, nurse practitioners, mental health professionals, health educators, athletic trainers, dietitians and nutritionists, and pharmacists. Some of the healthcare services extend to include massage therapists and other holistic health care professionals. While currently changing, the vast majority of college health services are set up as cost centers or service units rather than as parts of academic departments or health care delivery enterprises.

Ever increasing levels of college health often requires comprehensive environmental management, the coordination of resources, and institutional accountability for addressing the negative health impacts from alcohol use disorder and other substance abuse, mental illnesses such as depression and general anxiety disorders, sexual assault and discrimination among others. The creation of innovative strategies to address the behavioral determinants of health among post-secondary students continues to pose challenges for institutions worldwide.

== Common health concerns of college and university students ==
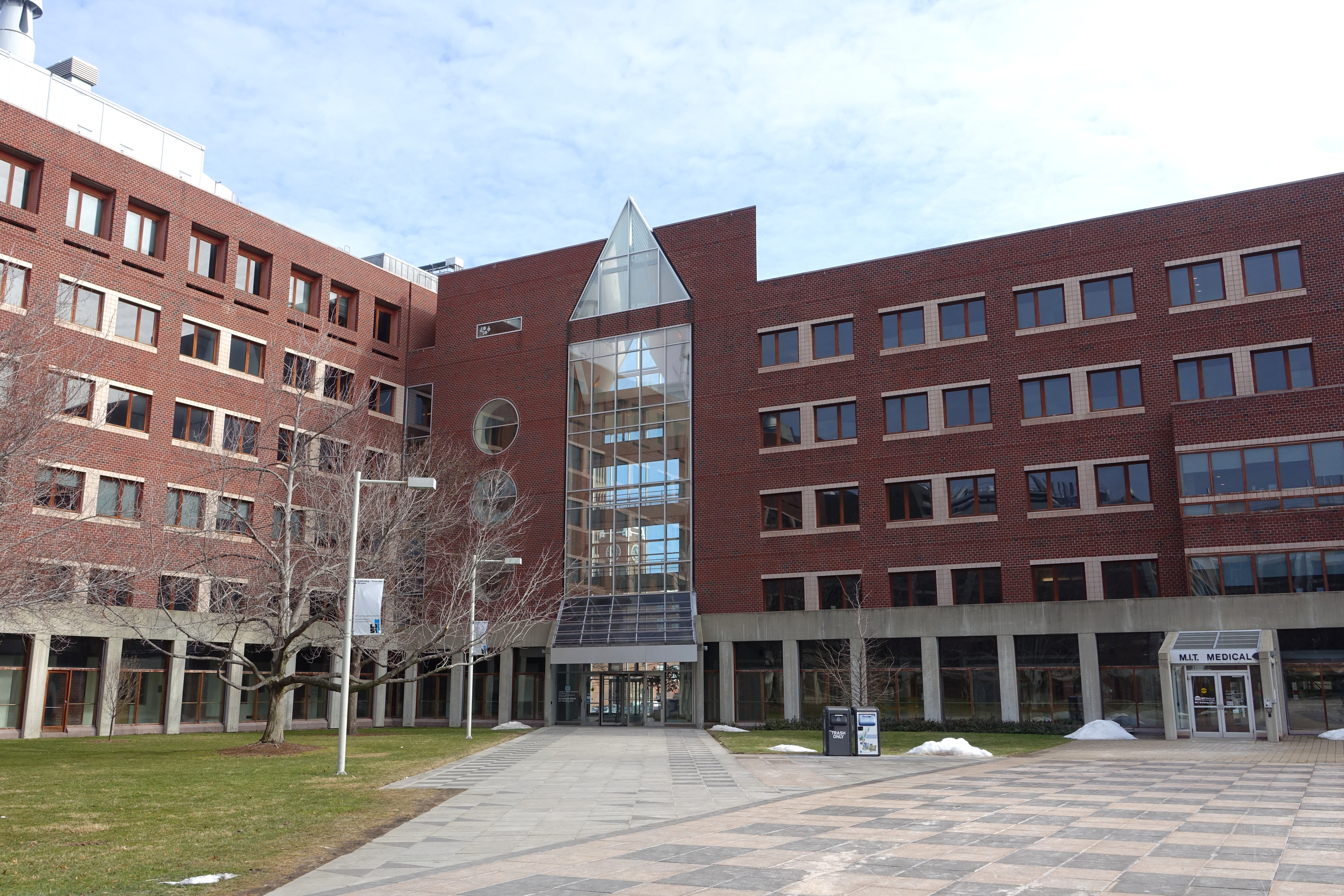
Building E23 (right) at the Massachusetts Institute of Technology houses its health services.

=== Distress ===
A common college health key performance indicator relates to levels and the management of stress. Distress is the a negative result from the body's adaptation to change. A post-secondary education contains both distress and eustress. Many institutions of higher education have a reputation for being high-stress environments. Throughout college or university, students often experience increased academic-related expectations, as well as a heightened level of overall responsibility that can adversely affects a student's wellbeing.

Likewise, students in post-secondary are often expected to balance social, financial, personal and professional responsibilities, while maintaining a strong academic performance. As a result, students in post-secondary often experience an increase in their overall stress level, compounded by a decreased perception of their own quality of life. With stress being a common aspect of students' academic experiences, the correlation between stress and compromised quality of life has become an area of increasing concern in post-secondary. In recent studies, stress has been shown to contribute to the formation of maladaptive coping strategies in post-secondary students, which can subsequently increase one's risk for developing adverse health complications throughout college or university, including depression. Additionally, factors such as physical and mental exhaustion, along with decreased sleep performance as a result of stress at university or college can be a major detriment to a student's perceived life satisfaction.

==== Academic ====
Post-secondary students experience stress from a variety of sources in their daily life, including academics. In a 2017 American College Health Association report, 47.5% of post-secondary students claimed that they considered their academic stress to be 'traumatic or very difficult to handle.' Disturbed sleep patterns, social problems, and homesickness are all major factors that can increase a student's perceived level of stress, including academic stress.

Academic competition is another major source of stress in post-secondary students' lives. High levels of colleague competitiveness has been reported to have a positive correlation with depression and anxiety in post-secondary students. Furthermore, while competition in academic environments can often be a perceived as a strong motivator to students, overall evidence suggests that it can also contribute to unhealthy levels of stress in an individual.

Learning how to develop effective strategies to manage personal stress in an academic setting can therefore help protect one against the risk of developing health complications in post-secondary. Yoga, breathing-techniques, and mindfulness interventions are all practices that have been proven to reduce stress among college students. Specifically, cortisol in students who engage in cognitive- and behavioral-based techniques has been proven to decrease post-intervention. Furthermore, studies suggest exercise and physical activity may have a protective effect against stress in post-secondary students.

===== Social pressures, bullying, and hazing =====
Bullying and harassment are documented contributors to psychological distress in higher education. Research indicates that college environments may produce forms of intimidation ranging from interpersonal peer conflict to workplace harassment among graduate students and academic researchers, which may negatively affect mental health and academic functioning.

In addition to these forms of bullying, social pressures surrounding fraternities and sororities have become a significant concern on many U.S. campuses. Greek-life organizations may foster environments where conforming to group norms, experiencing social exclusion, or participating in risky initiation practices can create substantial emotional strain. Hazing, defined as any activity expected of someone seeking to join a group that humiliates, degrades, abuses, or endangers regardless of willingness, has been linked to serious physical and psychological harm.

Multiple high-profile hazing incidents have resulted in hospitalization, severe trauma, or death. Research indicates that forced alcohol consumption, physical coercion, sleep deprivation, and psychological manipulation can lead to long-term mental health consequences, including post-traumatic stress symptoms, heightened anxiety, and impaired academic performance. Studies also suggest that campus climates dominated by Greek-life social norms produce secondary stress for non-affiliated students, especially when high-risk behaviors influence broader campus culture.

==== Personal ====
Intra-personal distresses, including perceived concerns relating to body-image and self-esteem, are common in adolescence. Furthermore, unhealthy body-image has been associated with a number of negative health complications, notably depression and disordered eating behaviors. Post-secondary institutions have therefore become widely recognized as ideal grounds for implementing evidence-based health interventions that provide students the opportunity to manage and improve their overall self-image.

Financial stress is also a major burden on students' health and wellbeing, as the academic term employs the expenditure of one's financial resources "without guarantees of a satisfactory return." In a 2019 report by The College Board on "Trends in College Pricing," the average tuition for full-time students attending a four-year-long post-secondary institution in the 2019–2020 academic year was about $12,700. With the costs of post-secondary education growing significantly over the last decade, many students are choosing to take out student loans to support their education. As a significant source of stress, student debt and financial instability have been linked to poorer general health outcomes and higher rates of depressive symptoms in young adults. Personal debt has also been associated with increased drug and alcohol use.

==== Adverse effects on health ====
The mental health of students can sometimes decline when attending college. Therefore, this increased stress has highlighted the need for mental health and counseling services available to students on campus. According to the American Psychological Association (APA), there was a 30% rise in students seeking psychological healthcare services on American campuses between the 2009–2010 and 2014–2015 academic year, with 61% of these students seeking counselling for anxiety, 49% seeking counselling for depression, 45% seeking counselling for stress, and 28% seeking counselling for concerns regarding academic performance.

=== Mental illness ===
Late adolescence and early adulthood is a window of onset for many psycho-social-behavioral illnesses. Therefore, mental health disorders are often first diagnosed in college students. In a survey of 14,000 college students from 8 different countries, researchers found that approximately 35% of students had an undiagnosed mental health illness. An estimated 75% of all lifetime mental disorders are developed by the age of 24. Common mental health problems among college students include anxiety disorders, depression, ADHD, sleep disorders, and suicide.

==== Depression ====
Major depressive disorder affects more than 16.1 million Americans over the age of 18 in a given year. Mental health issues can hinder student success in college. However, oftentimes college students experiencing depression have not been diagnosed. Demographically, upperclassmen, college students, and those living off campus are considered more likely to be depressed. Common concerns that lead to depression among college students include pressure to perform well academically, worries about success, and thoughts about post-graduation plans. The American College Health Association has been established for students with depression to provide resources, programs, and guidelines and promote mental health services.

==== Anxiety disorders ====
College students can experience significant stress and anxiety from having to balance a multitude of responsibilities such as managing rigorous coursework, participating in extracurricular activities, maintaining relationships, working, and managing finances. Anxiety or excessive worry can cause significant impairment in general functioning. Symptoms of general anxiety disorder include restlessness, difficulty concentrating, irritability, fatigue and sleep disturbances. In a 2018 survey, the American College Health Association reported that 63.4% of college students experienced overwhelming anxiety and 22.1% were diagnosed or professionally treated within the last 12 months. Students may also experience social anxiety disorder which is characterized by significant anxiety or fear of judgment or embarrassment in social situations such as meeting or conversing with new people, public speaking, and attending parties or social gatherings. As with depression, students with social anxiety disorder are more likely to have lower attendance and participation rates. Students that have experienced significant traumatic events such as sexual assault may develop post-traumatic stress disorder. In 2015, Association of American Universities conducted a survey on sexual assault misconduct in colleges. 11.7% of students reported to have experienced nonconsensual penetration or sexual touch by physical force or incapacitation while in college. Students with untreated anxiety disorders are at greater risk for drug and alcohol abuse.

==== Sleep disorders ====
Sleep is important for a person's physical and mental wellbeing, and the average college student is typically not getting the recommended amount of sleep. Not only are parents not around anymore to enforce bedtime but there are also a plethora of classes, parties, extracurriculars, and other events that cause each day to look different from the next. Due to the varying schedules, it is difficult for a college student to establish a routine for sleep, and can increase their risk of developing a sleeping disorder.

A sleeping disorder is a disorder that causes a person to have an abnormal sleep pattern. It can progress into other health problems if not treated. Some common sleep disorders are insomnia, sleep apnea, restless leg syndrome, and narcolepsy. Some of these conditions can be due to underlying health problems such as depression, anxiety, and panic disorders. Common symptoms include excessive daytime sleepiness, having trouble falling asleep, waking up in the middle of the night and having trouble falling or staying asleep.

==== ADHD ====
ADHD is prevalent in around 2–8% of students in the United States, and 25% of students with disabilities. Several studies state higher incidence of alcohol and substance use in students with ADHD. Of note, students with ADHD who took stimulant medications were found to have more problematic drinking habits than those who did not take stimulant medications.

There is a wide prevalence of prescription stimulant misuse among college campuses in the United States. The use of stimulants are increasing in students without ADHD, primarily for cognitive and academic improvements. There are numerous misconceptions that entice students to use Adderall as "performance enhancers", however scientific evidence illustrates a negative association between stimulant use and academic performance. There are potentially negative health effects that unprescribed stimulants may cause, such as elevated blood pressure, paranoia, serious cardiovascular adverse effects and sudden death which are warranted with a black box warning on amphetamine medications.

==== Eating disorders ====
Eating disorders are psychological conditions characterized by abnormal and hazardous eating habits. There exist several types, the most common being anorexia nervosa, bulimia nervosa, and binge-eating disorder. Anorexia nervosa occurs when individuals consider themselves as overweight despite being concerningly underweight. Individuals will monitor their weight by restricting consumption of calories and certain foods, and develop an obsession with their body image. Bulimia nervosa is characterized by reoccurring binge-eating episodes following by radical compensatory behaviours including fasting, self-induced vomiting, abuse of laxatives and diuretics, and/or excessive physical exercise. Similar to bulimia nervosa, individuals with binge-eating disorder will consume large portions of food in a short amount of time, but will not engage in compensatory behaviours.

Although eating disorders affect individuals of all genders, ethnicities, and races, many studies show a disproportionately increased risk among post-secondary students, with majority indicating a higher prevalence rate compared to the general population. This trend can be attributed to the unique challenges faced by college students as they attempt to navigate through and adapt to post-secondary life. Such difficulties include increased stressors and pressure, a lack of academic, social and/or financial structure, and fear of gaining excessive weight, which can exacerbate underlying mental health issues or, in some cases, create new ones. Additionally, eating disorders have more recently been attributed in part to body image issues stemming from the unrealistic portrayal of men and women on social media and on television.

Many students entering post-secondary institutions will already be experimenting with safe dieting methods; however, 35% will progress to pathological dieting, and of those, 20–25% develop partial or full-syndrome eating disorders. Cases of partial-eating disorders may become spontaneously remised, while a subset transition into a full disorder. According to a report by the National Eating Disorders Association, eating disorders typically occur between the ages of 18 and 21, with 10–20% and 4–10% of American college women and men being affected, respectively. Students experiencing symptoms of eating disorders are also more likely to experience psychiatric comorbidity.

Members of certain groups within college are more likely to report and experience symptoms of eating disorders, including athletes and transgender students. The National Association of Anorexia Nervosa and Associating Disorders states that 16% of American transgender students reported having an eating disorder. Another report published by the National Center on Addiction and Substance Abuse found that 35% of female and 10% of male athletes were at risk for anorexia nervosa, while 58% of female and 38% of male athletes were at risk for bulimia nervosa.

===== Effective interventions =====
Given that eating disorders have the highest mortality rate of all mental illnesses, early detection, prevention and treatment is of utmost importance when discussing effective recovery. Research shows that receipt of treatment for eating disorders is globally very low, creating a gap wherein individuals in need of care are not receiving proper treatment. Several studies investigating eating disorder prevalence on college campuses in the United States found that less than 20% of students who screened positive for an eating disorder received treatment for their diagnosis. Another study found that 30–70% of North American students seeking treatment for an eating disorder receive medical intervention for a perceived weight problem as opposed to a mental health problem. This is not ideal, as early detection and subsequent management significantly increases the chances of full recovery. It has been found that seeking help is disincentivized when students are not aware of the options available. Therefore, post-secondary institutions have a responsibility to reach out to students, provide tailored feedback on potential symptoms, aid in creating suggestions for future goals, and facilitate the recovery process.

Post-secondary campuses in North America already provide accessibility to some programs that are both feasible to deliver and facilitate comprehensive screening. The Healthy Body Image Program is an online platform intended to screen and deliver tailored interventions to students on campuses. The program labels students as low- or high-risk, or identifies those with a possible clinical/subclinical eating disorder. It subsequently offers suitable evidence-based online interventions or a referral to a specialized physician in order to address risks and clinical status. Educational campaigns intended to deliver factual knowledge regarding eating disorders and helpful resources have proven to be most successful when targeting students. Although many colleges in the United States offer annual or bi-annual education programs, very few do so on a monthly or weekly basis, which can impact students' ability to access proper services. Efficacy of treatments are also reported when there is an emphasis on holistic health and interactive components. Increasing media literacy, specifically concerning distorted media representation of body image, and promoting body satisfaction can improve management skills and encourage positive relationship building. Interventions that aid students in recognizing risk factors, such as sociocultural pressure for certain body types, body dissatisfaction, poor self esteem, and challenges with weight management deliver improvements in regards to body satisfaction. Additionally, interventions that promote weight control through healthy dietary techniques, utilize persuasion principles (e.g. foot-in-the-door method), and include motivational enhancement exercises have been reported to improve weight gain and functional impairment.

===== Treatment gaps =====
Although there are a number of helpful online and in-person detection services offered by post-secondary institutions, there is still a significant gap in regards to treatment of eating disorders on campuses. The National Eating Disorder Association found that therapeutic and counseling services were reported to be of highest importance; however, availability is scarce among staff who are specifically trained in counseling and nutritional services. Furthermore, there exists a lack of detection and treatment options to match the unique needs of sexual minority students, racial minority students, and college athletes, who appear to be at higher risk for eating disorders or related behaviours. As such, it is imperative for personnel to be properly trained in order to provide culturally and socially tailored help.

=== Alcohol and other drug use ===
The most common college health key performance indicator relates to levels and the management of alcohol and other drug (AOD) misuse and abuse. Substance abuse has been shown to peak in early adulthood. In college and university students, substance use is predicted by many factors including sensation seeking behavioural tendencies, perceived use of substances by peers, biological markers, and habits prior to post-secondary education. In North America, alcohol, marijuana, and tobacco are the most frequently used and misused substances.

Research has shown that fraternity and sorority affiliation is closely linked to elevated alcohol and drug consumption among college students. Students involved in Greek-life organizations report significantly higher rates of binge drinking and recreational drug use compared to their non-affiliated peers. Environmental norms, peer pressure, and the presence of alcohol in many social and initiation events contribute to this pattern. Elevated substance use within these groups has been associated with increased academic difficulties, injury, sexual risk-taking, and long-term alcohol-related harm. Additional research finds that fraternity membership predicts higher rates of binge drinking even after controlling for demographic factors and prior substance use behaviors.

==== Alcohol ====
Alcohol is the most heavily consumed substance globally, accounting for 4.6% of the global burden of disease with young adults disproportionately affected. According to the 2018 National College Health Assessment (NCHA) administered to college and university students in North America, 60.6% of males and 62.5% of females reported consuming alcohol within the last 30 days. Student perceptions about the frequency of alcohol use by their peers proved to be higher than reality, with NCHA results indicating that students perceived 93.2% of their peers to have consumed alcohol within 30 days. The National Institute on Alcohol Abuse and Alcoholism suggests that around 1,400 college students between the ages of 18 and 24 die annually as a result of alcohol consumption, and around half a million students sustain injuries under the influence of alcohol.

According to Alan Dennington, a researcher on the topic of mental health on college campuses, 1 in 4 college students experience a decline in their academics due to the use of alcohol. Many post-secondary institutions have introduced harm reduction programs with the goal of reducing problematic alcohol consumption habits among students. As of 2010, 98% of colleges in the United States used programming in order to reduce the risk of student drinking. In 2002, the National Institute on Alcohol Abuse and Alcoholism's Task Force on College Drinking published a set of recommendations for colleges and universities to reduce dangerous drinking behaviours. These guidelines included both individual-level and population-level strategies, including restricting alcohol consumption on campus, campaigns addressing social norms, and targeted educational initiatives. However, research suggests that these recommendations are not followed properly in American colleges, and updated approaches may be required. Some emerging strategies focus on the role of social media in propagating alcohol culture on post-secondary campuses. It has been found that increased marketing of alcoholic products is positively correlated with consumption by youth, a problem which has been exacerbated in recent years through the growing popularity of social media advertisements.

==== Tobacco ====
Tobacco can be consumed in a variety of forms with popular options for post-secondary students including cigarettes, e-cigarettes, and waterpipes. Tobacco consumption rates in post-secondary students vary dependent on the geographical location and gender of student. In North America, the National College Health Assessment (NCHA) for spring 2019 reported that 6.4% of students used cigarettes within the last 30 days, 12.6% used e-cigarettes, and 2.1% used water pipes (also known as shisha or hookah). In each category, use of tobacco products by men was more frequent. North American college students vastly overestimate the use of tobacco products by their peers, with cigarette use estimated at 70.2%, e-cigarettes estimated at 83.1%, and water pipes estimated at 58.2%.

Initially, e-cigarettes (also known as 'vapes') were viewed as a safer alternative to cigarettes, but are known to have expanded the tobacco market due to their appeal to youth. College students have been found to underestimate the dangers and addictiveness of e-cigarettes as compared to conventional cigarettes. While e-cigarettes contain lower levels of carcinogens than cigarettes, they still expose the user to ultrafine particles and other toxins that can increase risk of chronic disease.

Many post-secondary institutions in North America implement anti-smoking programs, exemplified by around 2000 smoke-free college sites in the United States and at least 65 in Canada. Many of these programs are expanded to all tobacco products, and aim to reduce student exposure to second-hand smoke, discourage use of tobacco products, and eliminate litter created by cigarette butts.

==== Cannabis ====
Marijuana is one of the most widely used drugs among young adults. According to the U.S. Department of Health & Human Services, 22% of college students and young adults report consuming marijuana within the past month. Data has shown that the proportion of young individuals who perceive marijuana as dangerous is decreasing, which may hinder prevention efforts, such as those against the emerging and popular administration route of vaping. Frequent use of marijuana by young people may be associated with poor health outcomes.

==== Additional drugs include ====
Other substances used by post-secondary students vary by geographic location, gender, socioeconomic status, and other factors. Substances used by college students include prescription opioids, amphetamines and other stimulants, hallucinogens, and sedatives.

Opioids are a class of drugs that can relax the body and relieve pain. In the United States, the National Institute on Drug Abuse (NIDA) reported that misuse of prescription opioids has dropped from 5.4% of college students in 2013 to 2.7% in 2018. Examples of prescription opioids include hydrocodone (Vicodin®), codeine, oxycodone (OxyContin®, Percocet®), and fentanyl. Misuse of opioids has resulted in the opioid epidemic affecting primarily North American countries.

Amphetamine and Dextroamphetamine (Adderall) is a medication used to treat attention deficit hyperactivity disorder (ADHD). Adderall falls under the drug class called stimulants. Over 2.5 million Americans are prescribed Adderall, and roughly 50% of college students that were prescribed this drug have been asked by their peers if they can buy some. Adderall is linked to aggression, restlessness, increased blood pressure and heart rate, paranoia, psychosis, seizures, heart attack, and stroke. Adderall is known to only improve the cognitive processing in those who have conditions such as ADHD; for individuals with no cognitive condition, the drug should have no effect and taking this drug can result in negative effects. Other prescription stimulant drugs include Concerta® and Ritalin®, which are both brand names for methylphenidate hydrochloride. Non-prescription stimulant drugs include cocaine and methamphetamine (commonly known as meth). The NIDA has reported that 11.4% of young adults aged 18–25 have used cocaine in their lifetime.

Hallucinogens alter one's perceptions of reality as well as their thoughts and emotions. This class of drugs include psilocybin (commonly known as magic mushrooms or shrooms), D-lysergic acid diethylamide (LSD), salvia, and ketamine. The NIDA reports that over two hundred thousand Americans over the age of 12 reported use of LSD within the past month.

Sedative drugs, such as benzodiazepines, are often used to relieve anxiety or induce sleep. This class of drugs includes diazepam (Valium®), lorazepam (Ativan), and Alprazolam (Xanax). A 2001 study of college students from 119 American 4-year college programs found that 7.8% of students had tried benzodiazepines in their lifetime.

=== Sexual health ===
==== Sexually transmitted infections ====
College health key performance indicator relating to levels harm from sexual activity are common. Although anyone engaging in sexual activity can contract a sexually transmitted infection (STI), adolescents are particularly susceptible and account for increased prevalence rates compared to the general population. The Centers for Disease Control and Prevention reported that youth aged 15–24 account for the highest incidence of combined total cases of gonorrhea, chlamydia and syphilis in 2015. This age group made up 65% of chlamydia cases, and 53% of gonorrhea cases. Additionally, a study found that 15% of respondents in a sample of 2000 current and former American college students report never using a condom, and 4% only do so when their partner asks. Given college students fall within the age range of 15–24, and are more inclined to engage in casual sexual encounters without proper protection, post-secondary institutions hold a responsibility to ensure adequate STI screening and education prevention. One study investigated the prevalence of chlamydia among college students in the United States, and found that routine screening is not available, or easily accessible, at most post-secondary institutions.

== Common services, programs and policies included in advancing the health and wellbeing of College and University students ==
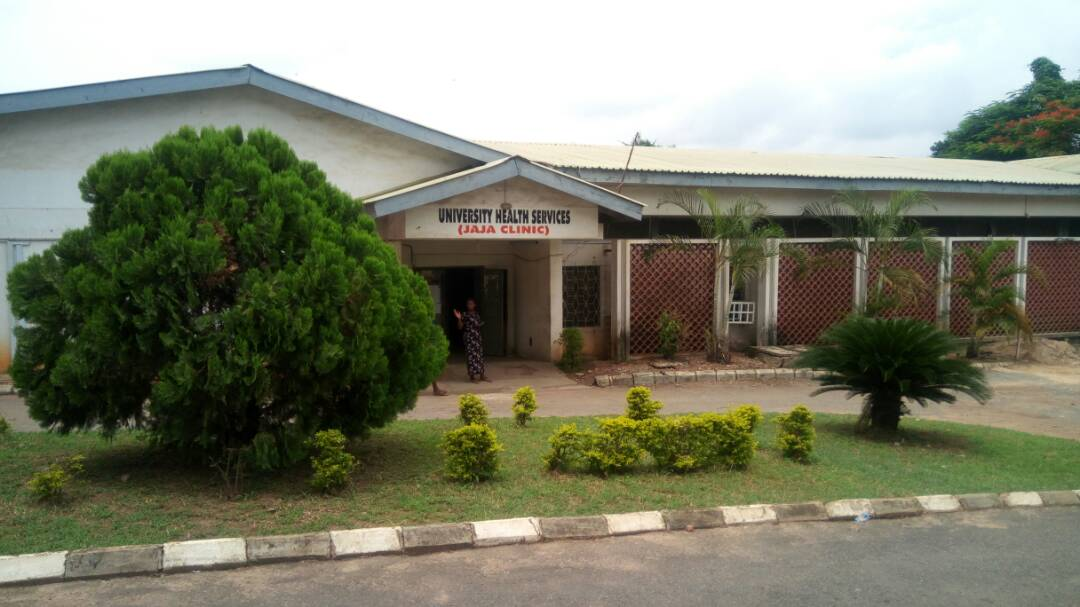
University Health Services Centre at the University of Ibadan in Nigeria

=== Psychological counseling and other mental healthcare services ===
Post-secondary institutions are faced with the challenge of attempting to prevent, identify and treat mental illnesses among college students. Some challenges arise from fragmented services, reactive responses, piecemeal funding and high resource needs, among other potential factors. A report by the Ontario College Health Association found that college students were more than twice as likely to report mental illness symptoms and elevated stress levels than non-college students. This growing demand for on-campus resources may be related to increased numbers of nontraditional students, such as students with disabilities. As a result, smaller institutions, which tend to have fewer mental health professionals and greater budgetary constraints, may experience enhanced resource strain and greater challenges in addressing the mental health concerns of their students. However, when looking at these services, culture needs to be taken into account, since traditionally under represented students are less likely to seek psychological counseling as opposed to their classmates. The interventions used by many of these American universities, use a more western approach to service delivery which tends to inadequately address the mental health concerns of the culturally diverse communities that make up these universities.

To continually achieve college health, many institutions engage in both the process of healthcare and the process of health promotion. The advancement of student health through educational, political, regulatory and organizational supports is referred to as Health Promotion in Higher Education. As the current era of public health, health promotion goes beyond bio-behavioral influences using a settings approach, with the settings including: school health, institution/community health, and work sites. Another national body in the field of college health is the National Collegiate EMS Foundation (NCEMSF), which is dedicated to the promotion and support of emergency medical services on college and university campuses. Other national and international associations include National Association of Student Personnel Administrators (NASPA) and National Intramural-Recreational Sports Association (NIRSA). While the goal of post-secondary institutions is not necessarily to provide psychiatric interventions, an increasing number of academic institutions strive towards establishing guidelines and developing on-campus mental healthcare services. Although elements of screening, identification, and treatment services exist across post-secondary institutions, the accessibility of and available resources is variable. The student counselling centre is most commonly identified as responsible for mental health care and support, with electronic self-referrals via online counselling centre websites becoming increasingly common. Moreover, the use of internet-based technology typically involves cognitive behavioural therapy, one of the most commonly employed mediums targeting depression and anxiety among the student population. Associated with significant positive outcomes, this intervention appears to be promising for students in university settings.

Some campuses are working towards establishing meaningful connection with Aboriginal, international and LGBT students to increase social and mental health support among vulnerable student populations. For instance, E-health interventions linking traditionally under represented students with culturally connected providers is a potential service that academic institutions could consider implementing.

Many counseling centers are reorienting towards prevention and providing opportunities for personal skills development that are unique and separate from traditional methods of talk therapies. The efficacy of mindfulness-based interventions in the college setting has been a recent topic of exploration. A randomized control trial examined the efficacy of an Internet-based mindfulness training program (iMIND) and an Internet-based cognitive-behavioral training program (iCBT) in promoting mental health outcomes among Hong-Kong college students. Each 8-week long program consisted of eight 30- to 45-minute sessions involving didactic readings, experiential learning (e.g. guided meditation) and daily life applications (e.g. developing self-awareness). Both programs showed potential in improving mental well-being, psychological distress and life satisfaction from pre- to post-assessment.

=== Assessing College Health ===
There are various aspects linked to college health concerns, and solutions are available on college campuses. Medical professionals have found a higher rate of health issues in young adults on college campuses. Adolescents can develop health issues, and physical and behavioral trait changes with the transition to college campuses. Various health concerns occur, such as sexual health, chronic diseases, disorders, stress, and substance use. Colleges strive to support the development of young adults throughout their years on campus. Despite their busy schedules, it is a priority to have resources available to students. Healthcare professionals and counselors play significant roles in developing students who seek help with issues they struggle with. They can be positive outlets for students working through new environments they have transitioned to. Counselors have recognized that students come to colleges with diverse ranges of perspectives and backgrounds that they bring with them. While counselors see similar themes among students, each patient's topic differs as they transition from adolescents to adults. Their services are accessible to students either in person or online.

=== Influence of Online Services ===
The internet has been a dominant resource for college students regarding health information. "It offers online health information and service delivery through various formats, including text-based health information, emails, chatrooms, and listservs." A wide variety of online services are readily available for students who need help with access, availability, and high-cost rates. These services can provide solutions for students seeking assistance in non-traditional ways, such as face-to-face. "Of the 514 students who reported seeking health information on the Internet, 204 (36.7%) felt that retrieving health information online improved how they took care of their health a lot or some." Help-seeking is "the process of actively seeking out and utilizing social relationships, either formal or informal, to help with personal problems" (p. 8). Overall, online health services have had positive outcomes for college students. Through research, nine studies have evaluated online health experiences. Ninety percent of participants were satisfied with the service, 86% would continue to use it or use it again, and 72% would recommend it to a friend.

=== Physical activity, recreation, nutrition and other health-related campus services ===
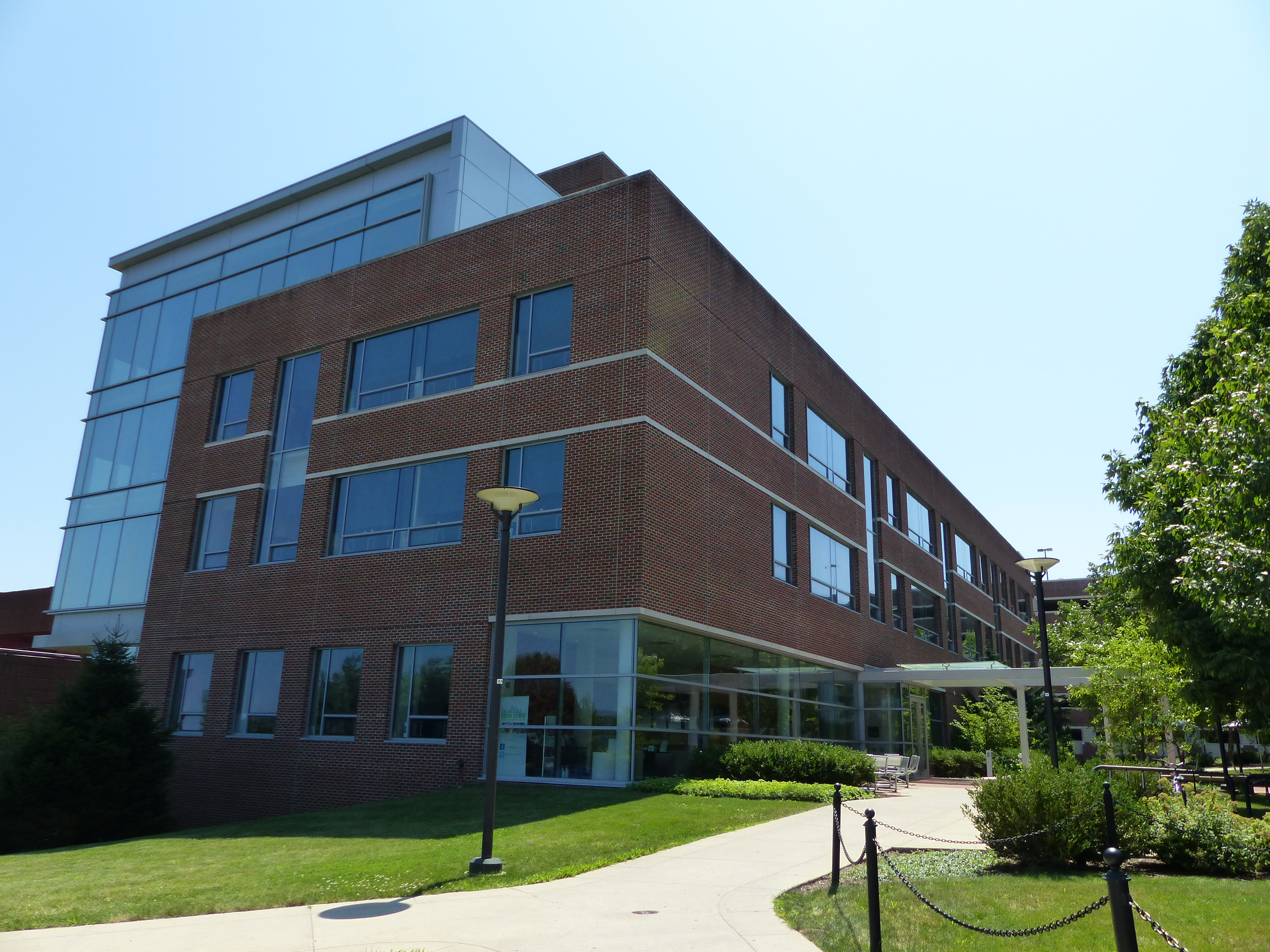
Pennsylvania State University Health Services

College represents a key period to engage and influence numerous health behaviors among young adults, including promoting physical activity. Regular physical activity has been recognized as fundamental to the improvement of both physical and psychological functioning. Promoting physical activity among college and university students can provide an opportunity to encourage long-term active habits. Approximately half or more of university students in the United States, Canada, and China were categorized as insufficiently active. Seminars and counselor-led workshops dealing with recommendations and strategies to maintaining an active lifestyle appear to be effective means of preserving or enhancing healthy behaviours during the transition into university life. Studies have also suggested that information about the benefits of physical activity could have a greater effect on college students' general health, mental health, and happiness when positively framed. NIRSA comprises and supports leaders in collegiate recreation

The college years are a potential period for nutrition-related interventions, as eating behaviours among college students may carry over to later life. Healthy or poor nutritional habits among college students may stem from the interplay of several components, including personal, sociocultural and economic factors. Low-intake of fruits and vegetables among students may result from relatively low amounts of these foods in traditional dishes and unfamiliarity with reading and comprehending food labels. In addition to these sociocultural and educational barriers, other factors such as such as the cost of living and food availability at college are cited as hurdles even for motivated students. On the other hand, factors such as individual knowledge and awareness as well as parental support are cited as having a positive influence in promoting healthy eating among students. A variety of social change campaigns have been explored as options to promote healthy eating in the college setting. Ensuring easy availability of fruits and vegetables on-campus through farmers' markets or the cafeteria consistently providing healthier alternatives are potential strategies. Utilizing promotional point-of-purchase messages in the cafeteria is another method that may encourage students to make healthier choices. National Association of College and University Food Services (NACUFS) can be significant partners in achieving key performance indicators in college health.

Lack of time, lack of motivation, and no access to workout facilities are some of the most common excuses among college students. Availability of resources, social support, and individual goals can influence students' level of participation on physical activities as well. Working out in the company of friends can encourage students, whereas lack of knowledge about the facilities and equipments can increase feelings of intimidation. For busy individuals, short strength training programs consisting in single sets can be effective.

== Relationship to adolescent medicine ==
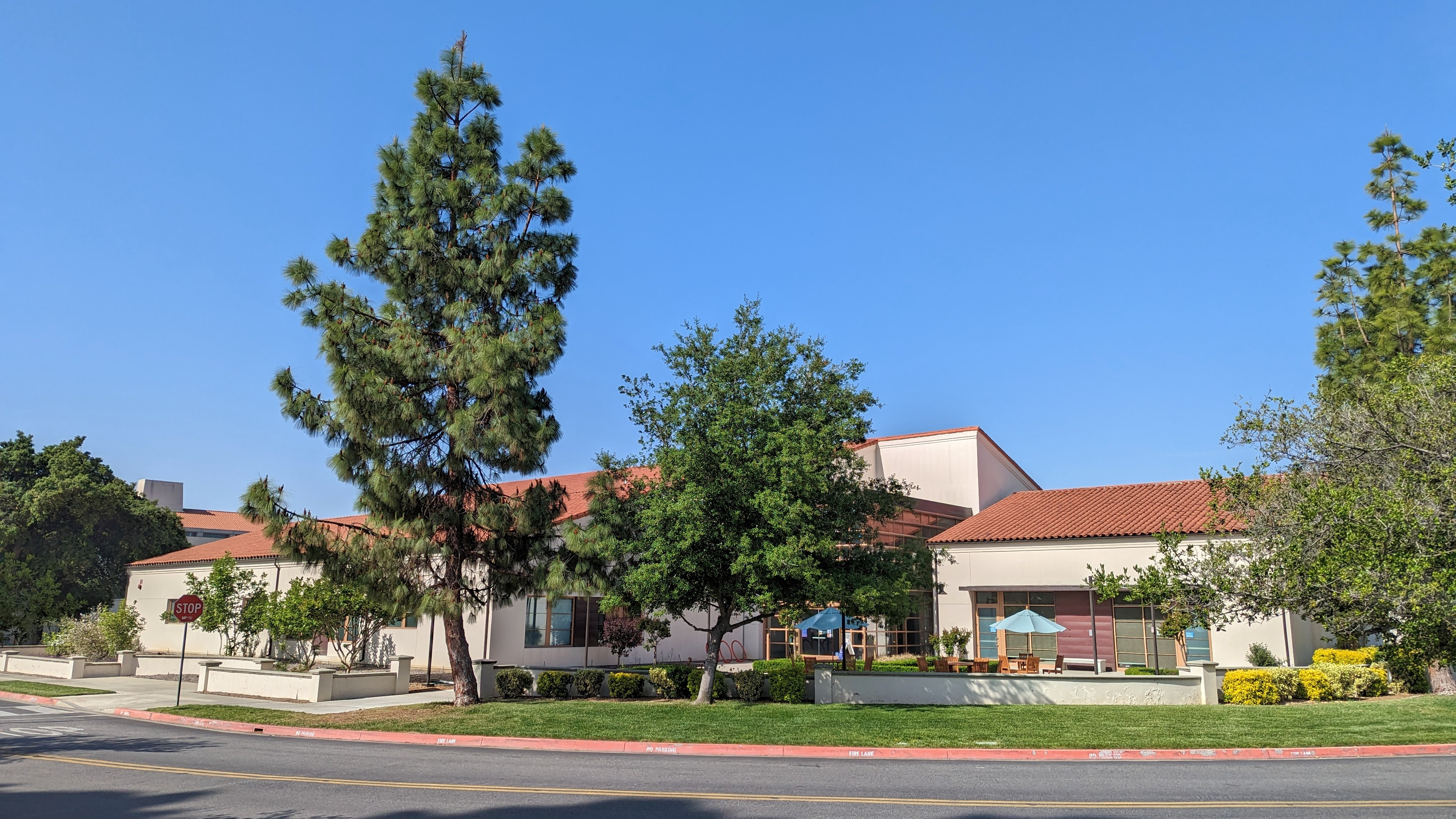
Tranquada Student Services Center at the Claremont Colleges in Southern California

In the United States, the subspecialty of college health is closely affiliated with adolescent medicine. Many adolescent medicine fellowships include rotations in college-based student health clinics and many adolescent medicine physicians work in college health clinics. College students are generally at the latter edge of the age range of pediatrics in the United States.

== See also ==
- Cigarette smoking among college students
- Mental health in education
- School nursing
- Hazing in fraternities and sororities
- List of hazing deaths in the United States
- Fraternities and sororities
- Student health
