= Journal of College Student Development =

- Discipline: Pedagogy
- Language: English
- Edited by: Debora L. Liddell

Publication details
- Former name(s): Journal of College Student Personnel
- History: 1959-present
- Publisher: Johns Hopkins University Press (United States)
- Frequency: Bimonthly

Standard abbreviations
- ISO 4: J. Coll. Stud. Dev.

Indexing
- ISSN: 0897-5264 (print); 1543-3382 (web)
- OCLC no.: 17539103

Links
- Journal homepage; Online access

The Journal of College Student Development is a bimonthly peer-reviewed academic journal established in 1959 and is the official publication of American College Personnel Association - College Student Educators International. The journal publishes scholarly articles and book reviews from a wide variety of academic fields related to college students and student affairs. The journal is published by the Johns Hopkins University Press and the editor-in-chief is Debora L. Liddell (University of Iowa).
