= LGBTQ student center =

College

LGBTQ student centers and services are administrative offices of a college, university or students' union that provide resources and support for lesbian, gay, bisexual, transgender and queer (LGBTQ) students. LGBTQ has expanded to LGBTQ2IA+ to include lesbian, gay, bisexual, transgender, queer, two-spirit, intersex, aromantic, asexual, agender and other identities.

== History ==
United States of America

In 1971, the University of Michigan became the first university in the U.S. to create a campus LGBT center.

The 1998 murder of Matthew Shepard sparked an increase in the number of university LGBT student centers in the late 1990s and early 2000s. For institutions like Syracuse University, a continued presence of hostile actions and climate spreading to campus has led to the creation of these centers. The movement has been slower outside of predominantly white institutions (PWIs); the first historically black college/university (HBCU) to open a center was Bowie State University in 2012.

Despite the increasing support for these centers, it has been repeatedly noted that university administrators need to be made more aware of the issues facing LGBTQ+ students and the need for these centers on their campuses.

Most LGBT student centers are concentrated where there is more support for LGBTQ+ students. As of March 2019, there are still eight states that have no institutions with an LGBT student center and nine that only have one institution with a center statewide.

As of March 2015, more than half of post-secondary institutions in Canada have active LGBT student centers, with the oldest centre's establishment dating to before 1970.

Several variables have been shown to impact the probability of an LGBT student center opening on a campus, including financial resources and the political environment.

In March 2023 the University of Pennsylvania LGBT Center, the second oldest in the country establishing in 1982, named the first in the United States, scholar in residence, after a $2 million donation.

== Function ==
According to Sokolowski and the Consortium of Higher Education LGBT Resource Professionals, "LGBT resource centers must also be staffed by at least one halftime (50% or 20 hours per week) professional staff person or graduate assistant whose job description is solely dedicated to serving the LGBT resource center and its services." Depending on the campus, an LGBT Campus Center's mission may include faculty support, student advocacy, alumni relations, and/or public relations with the greater community (especially in response to crisis). Contrary to some beliefs and researcher opinions, LGBT student centers remain open to allies of the LGBTQ+ community and those questioning their identity.

An LGBT Campus Center may provide academic resources related to LGBT Studies, support social opportunities for LGBT people to interact, and sponsor educational events for the campus as a whole. Most Campus Centers provide referrals to other campus departments or off-campus organizations to help meet student needs. Due to this increased support, many students view these centers more positively than the rest of their institution's campus and climate, creating a "micro-climate" in the larger scheme of an institution's campus climate. Regardless of the concentration of on-campus support in these centers, the presence of these centers typically increases the available resources for students and increases perception from outside of the institution. Students who engage with centers are more likely to be out which allows them to further connect with these current students, but also encourages other LGBTQ+ students come out and grow relationships with them.

Some LGBT Campus Centers provide psychological counseling for students struggling with their sexual or gender identity and for students coping with internal or external prejudice. Some example scenarios of when a student might seek out counseling from an LGBT Campus Center:

- A questioning student seeks help understanding their sexual identity
- A transgender student has just experienced a bias-motivated attack
- A cisgender student is struggling to understand how to support their transgender roommate

Some LGBT Campus Centers lack secure financial support that is sufficient to sustain their services, resulting in closures.

== Criticism ==
=== Positives of LGBT student centers ===
Since the more rapid rise of centers beginning in the late 1990s/early 2000s, there has additionally been an increasing need for these centers—particularly as the proportion of openly LGBTQ+ in the United States has steadily increased. Awareness of centers and their resources on campus may be one of the most significant issues in regards to justification and expansion of existing centers. Additionally to further awareness, there have been calls to furthering numbers of resource centers across the United States due to roughly 10-15% of U.S. institutions of higher education having a center for LGBTQ+ students. On an international level, the Consortium of Higher Education LGBT Resource Professionals lists only three universities in Canada and one outside of North America that currently have resource centers for LGBTQ+ students. Centers are still frequently seen as a key way to foster relationships and networking among LGBTQ+ students, faculty, and staff, and are often marketed as such to bring a positive awareness.

Post-secondary institutions who dedicate physical space in the form of LGBTQ+ student centers contribute to a positive climate for students who identify with the LGBTQ+ community. LGBTQ+ student centers act as a reminder to the LGBTQ+ community as a space known to be welcoming and accepting of all. Higher education professionals who are associated with LGBTQ+ student centers contribute to the development of an inviting and inclusive environment, also known as a "warm" campus climate. This creation of a "warm" climate allows for students to develop not only intellectually through High Impact Practices (HIPs) but holistically through mentorship and counselling support. This physical space has been noted as an effective way to incorporate the LGBTQ+ community in providing a safe space for students to find support while combating the adversities they experienced as students at their post-secondary institution. Through qualitative accounts from students discussing the importance of this space acting as their primary stop when looking for support, students stated that they knew they would find others and more importantly professional staff who would support them through navigating processes on campus and connecting them with other professional staff that would be supportive of them. LGBTQ+ student centers are key contributors in the development of inclusive environments for the LGBTQ+ community and link to academic persistence at post-secondary institutions. The Transformational Tapestry Model (TTM) focuses on the correlation between campus climate and student persistence investigated critical incidents, harassment bias, and interactions between individuals and groups where homophobia and heterosexism were at play and it was established that these experiences decreased campus engagement for LGBTQ+ students and resulted in more students withdrawing from their institutions. The need for inclusion on campuses is ensuring that students feel welcomed and accepted in their spaces. Inclusion at its core provides LGBTQ+ students the same engagement opportunities as their counterparts, and it provides the equity that students have been working in absence of when showcasing their true potential.

=== Negatives or areas of growth for LGBT student centers ===
Centers have been criticized for often being established, given full-time staff, or otherwise expanded in reaction to an event or events on or off-campus. Additionally, many students may feel that even after the creation of a campus LGBT+ center, there may be an existing culture of hostility and homophobia and transphobia within the student body and university staff, faculty, and administration. Aside from combating prejudices toward the LGBTQ+ community, there may need to be additional work done to combat other prejudices perpetuated by members of a campus LGBTQ+ community and their center's space, staff, and programming. A key critique of current outreach has been that existing centers may be unintentionally serving and targeting more privileged and "dominant" identity-holding members of a campus's LGBTQ+ community. For LGBTQ+ students of color, this may negatively impact them. The support needed to bolster higher administration to allocate the funds, staffing, and resources is often very hard to attain or takes years of momentum among predominantly undergraduate students. Due to centers primarily focusing on student outreach and assistance, some have criticized the undue burden put on students, particularly undergraduates, to bring action, successful programs, and acclaim from both university administrators and outside organizations like Campus Pride. In regards to non-students, there has been additional criticism of existing centers and other university administrators for poor outreach to LGBTQ+ alumni and potential LGBTQ+ alumni donors.

== Naming centers ==
Many universities such as Bowling Green State University have expanded upon 'LGBT' to be more inclusive in their titles like 'LGBTQ+ Resource Center.' Students have been gradually preferring less binary labels for their personal identities as well as campus-affiliated resource centers. While some universities like the University of Vermont and their Prism Center have expanded for the sake of inclusivity, other institutions like the University of Tennessee, Knoxville and their Pride Center may additionally have intentions to manage a lower profile, especially when it comes to state and federal funding.

Some LGBT labels have historically been more associated with either white or non-white cultures and have certain political connotations.

== See also ==
- Student affairs
- List of LGBTQ-related organizations and conferences, includes campus and non-campus organizations
