= Journal of Mixed Methods Research =

- Discipline: Research Methods
- Language: English
- Edited by: Michael D. Fetters and Jose F. Molina-Azorin

Publication details
- History: 2007-present
- Publisher: SAGE Publications
- Frequency: Quarterly
- Impact factor: 3.524 (2018)

Standard abbreviations
- ISO 4: J. Mix. Methods Res.

Indexing
- ISSN: 1558-6898
- LCCN: 2005214092
- OCLC no.: 62122358

Links
- Journal homepage; Online access; Online archive

The Journal of Mixed Methods Research is a peer-reviewed academic journal that publishes papers in the field of Research Methods. The journal's editors are Michael D. Fetters (Department of Family Medicine, Michigan Medicine, University of Michigan, United States) and Jose F. Molina-Azorin (University of Alicante, Alicante, Spain). It has been in publication since 2007 and is currently published by SAGE Publications.

== Scope ==
The website of the Journal of Mixed Methods Research indicates that "[m]ixed methods research is defined as research in which the investigator collects and analyzes data, integrates the findings, and draws inferences using both qualitative and quantitative approaches or methods in a single study or program of inquiry." The journal publishes empirical, methodological, and theoretical articles involving mixed methods research across social and behavioral sciences.

== Abstracting and indexing ==
The Journal of Mixed Methods Research is abstracted and indexed in, among other databases: SCOPUS, and the Social Sciences Citation Index. According to the Journal Citation Reports, its 2018 impact factor is 3.524, ranking it 1 out of 98 journals in the category ‘Social Sciences, Interdisciplinary’.
