= Canadian Association of College and University Student Services =

The Canadian Association of College and University Student Services (CACUSS) is a professional association representing and serving those individuals who work in Canadian post-secondary institutions in student affairs and services. Since 1973, CACUSS has provided professional development services and programs for members in all the Canadian provinces. Cross-divisional interest groups called communities of practice and networks were formed by members in 2015 based on their professional needs, focusing on areas such as student health and wellness, first-year students, new professionals, and leadership education.

== Communities of Practice ==
CACUSS is a comprehensive organization consisting of networks and Communities of Practice representing many topical and functional areas of Student Affairs and Services.

The following communities currently exist:

- Aboriginal Student Services Assembly (NASSA)
- Accessibility and Inclusion
- Academic Learning
- Community Engaged Learning
- Co-Curricular Record
- Digital Communications
- Equity Seeking Groups
- Advising
- Internationalization in Student Affairs
- Leadership Educators
- Orientation, Transition, Retention
- Post-Secondary Student Counselling
- Campus Mental Health
- Research Assessment, Evaluation
- Spirituality and Religious Pluralism
- Student Case Managers
- Student Conduct
- Student Health & Wellness
- Student Peer Support Programs
- Students with Family Responsibilities
- Graduate and Second Entry Student

== Resources for Members ==
=== Communiqué ===
Communiqué is a journal that is published bi-annually by the Canadian Association of College and University Student Services which includes material relevant to college and university student services in Canada. The journal provides an opportunity for student affairs professionals and senior leadership to keep up to date on current issues and trends, best-practices, new developments, and initiatives. Anyone is able to contribute content to the publication, not just members of CACUSS.

=== Health data ===
As an information sharing courtesy to its members, CACUSS posts health data from the National College Health Assessment (NCHA). This nationally recognized research survey is administered in Canada every three years by the American College Health Association. The NCHA is a comprehensive assessment of college student health and it examines:

- Alcohol, tobacco, and other drug use
- Sexual health
- Weight, nutrition, and exercise
- Mental health
- Personal safety and violence

In 2019, there were about 55,000 student respondents, an increase from the 44,000 respondents in 2016. Student affairs professionals can utilize the data to learn about their students’ health and behaviours, to design programs and initiatives applicable to their student populations, and inform resource allocation. Data can also be used by student affairs professionals, as well as faculty and students, to inform presentations, classes, marketing campaigns, and promotional material.

=== Student affairs job board ===
The CACUSS website posts current job opportunities available in Canada in the student affairs field. Jobs are submitted by Canadian post-secondary institutions.

=== Listing of graduate and certificate programs in student affairs ===
For new student affairs professionals, or for professionals looking to advance their career, the CACUSS website provides a comprehensive listing of graduate degree and certificate programs offered in Canada. Each listing includes information on the institution, type of program, style of delivery, area of focus, and contact information for additional information.

=== Professional Development ===
==== Student Affairs and Services Competency Model ====
In 2014, CACUSS developed the Student Affairs and Services Competency Model with three goals in mind: to grow CACUSS as a professional organization, to advance the professionalization of student affairs in Canada, and to support the development of student affairs professionals in Canada. Building on the ACPA/NASPA Professional Competencies Rubric, the model was developed through a consultation process with student affairs professionals across Canada, which also included gathering and articulating the shared values that informed student affairs practice specific to Canada. Student affairs research from around the world also informed the development of the competency model.

The competency model details the values of Canadian student affairs practice: that student affairs professionals are educators; that student affairs is student-centered and holistic in practice; and that student affairs is a professional and ethical practice. Each competency is divided into three levels which include core, intermediate, and advanced. The levels represent increasing skills and knowledge student affairs professionals attain as they advance in their practice. Student affairs professionals can develop their competencies by utilizing this model to inform and guide their professional development as they advance through each of the levels.

The competencies included in the model are:

1. Communication
2. Emotional and interpersonal Intelligence
3. Intercultural
4. Indigenous cultural awareness
5. Post-secondary acumen
6. Equity, diversity and inclusion
7. Leadership, management and administration
8. Strategic planning, research and assessment
9. Student advising, support and advocacy
10. Student learning and development
11. Technology and digital engagement

==== Webinars ====
CACUSS members, as well as non-members, can access free webinars on the CACUSS YouTube Channel. Members have access to additional webinars on the members' webpage.

==== Annual Conference ====
CACUSS hosts an annual conference in alternating locations across Canada. Members are encouraged to build presentations and panels, and special guest speakers are asked to attend. The conference is attended by a wide range of professionals (Senior leaders, student life professionals, emerging student affairs professionals, registrarial staff, etc) both as members and non-members of the association The conference provides an opportunity for attendees to network, discuss current issues, share resources and ideas to support students on their campuses.

Year	Host/Location	Theme	Notes
1970	Montreal, QC		
1971	Dalhousie University/Halifax, NS		
1972	University of Windsor/Windsor, ON		
1973	Universite de Montreal/Montreal, QC		
1974	University of Calgary/Banff, AB		
1975	Brock University/St Catharines, ON	Higher Education in Austerity: New Perceptions and New Directions	
1976			
1977	Memorial University of Newfoundland/St John's, NL		
1978	University of Waterloo/Waterloo, ON	The Student and the Environment-Beyond the Ivory Tower/ L'etudiant et l'environment- Au dela de la tour d'ivoire	
1979	Universite de Sherbrooke/ Sherbrooke, QC	For a Better Life/Mieux Vivre	
1980	University of Victoria/ Victoria, BC	Working Together/Travailler de Concert	
1981	University of Ottawa/ Ottawa, ON	The Student Population From the Perspective of Student Services	
1982	Concordia University/ Montreal, QC	Enrichment and Survival/Reussir et Survivre	
1983	University of Prince Edward Island/ Charlottetown, PE	The Successful Student/L'Etudiant Accompli	
1984	University of Windsor/ Windsor, ON	New Faces: New Challenges/Nouveaux Visages: Nouveaux Defis	
1985	Universite de Laval/ Quebec City, QC	Hope for Youth!/De L'Espoir Pour La Jeunesse!	
1986	University of British Columbia/ Vancouver, BC		
1987	University of Western Ontario/ London, ON	Exploring Excellence/A La Recherche de l'Excellence	
1988	University of Manitoba/ Winnipeg, MB	The Challenge of Change/Le Defi Du Chagement	
1989	Acadia University/ Wolfville, NS	Higher Education and the Community	In partnership with the Atlantic Association of College and University Student Services
1990	University of Toronto/ Toronto, ON	A Delicate Balance: Human Needs and Institutional Limits/Un equilibre fragile...Les Besoins Humains et les limites Institutionelles	
1991	University of Calgary/ Calgary, AB	Bold Horizons	
1992	Universite de Sherbrooke/ Sherbrooke, QC		
1993	Brock University/ St Catharines, ON	Juggling Needs, Making Choices/Faire des Choix un Tour D'addresse	
1994	The Marine Institute, Memorial University of Newfoundland, and Cabot College/ St John's Newfoundland	Catch the Drift: Thriving in the 90's	In partnership with the Atlantic Association of College and University Student Services
1995	University of Guelph/ Guelph, ON	Rising to the Challenge	
1996	Simon Fraser University/ Burnaby, BC	Exploring New Heights: Reaching the Summit Together:	
1997	Dalhousie University/ Halifax, NS	Navigating Uncharted Waters/Comment Navigeur Dans Les Eux Inexplorees	
1998	University of Ottawa/ Ottawa, ON	Total Student Learning...A Capital Investment	25th Anniversary of CACUSS
1999	University of Victoria/ Victoria, BC	Soften the Landing/L'arrivee en douceur	
2000	York University/ Toronto, ON	Eclectic Voices	
2001	Concordia University/ Montreal, QC	Dialogue Transition/Dialogue Transition	
2002	University of New Brunswick/ Fredericton, NB	Where the Land Meets the Sea/La Ou La Terre Accueille La Mer	
2003	University of British Columbia/ Vancouver BC	Imagine the Learning/Soyons Imaginatif	
2004	Winnipeg, Manitoba	At the Centre of it All	
2005	Queen's University/ Kingston, ON	High Tech, High Touch/Haute Technologie, Haute Contact	In partnership with Canadian Association of Student Financial Aid Administrators
2006	McMaster University/ Hamilton, ON	Leading The Way/Frayer La Voie	
2007	Saskatchewan Institute of Applied Science and Technology and University of Saskatchewan/ Saskatoon, SK	Building Bridges/Batir Des Ponts	
2008	College of the North Atlantic and Memorial University of Newfoundland/ St John's, NL	Imagine!	
2009	Conestoga College, Wilfrid Laurier University and University of Waterloo/Waterloo, ON	The Power of Three/Le Pouvoir des Trois	
2010	MacEwan University, Norquest college, Concordia University College of Alberta, University of Alberta, and Yellowhead Tribal College/ Edmonton, AB	Shine	
2011	Ryerson University/ Toronto, ON	At the Heart of Diversity	
2012	Brock University/ St Catharine's ON	Engaging Digital Citizens	
2013	McGill University/ Montreal, QC	Passion	
2014	St Mary's University/ Halifax, NS	Navigating Change: Campus, Culture, Community	
2015	Simon Fraser University/ Vancouver, BC	Whole Campus Whole Student: Creating Healthy Communities	
2016	Red River College/ Winnipeg, MB	Muddy Waters, Blue Skies	
2017	Carleton University/ Ottawa, ON	Our Past, Our Future	
2018	Holland College and University of Prince Edward Island/ Charlottetown, PEI	Sea Change	In partnership with the Association of Registrars of The Universities and Colleges of Canada
2019	Mount Royal University/Calgary, AB	Moh-Kins-Tsis: Where the rivers meet	
2020	Centennial College, George Brown College, Humber College, Seneca College and Sheridan College/ Toronto, ON	Learn, Unite, Act	Cancelled due to Covid-19 Pandemic
2021	Virtual	Now More Than Ever	
2022	Virtual	Critical Reflection in Shifting Times	
2023	Niagara Falls	Honour, Engage, Evolve	
2024	Virtual	Supporting our students; Sustaining ourselves	
2025	Halifax, NS	Keeping the wind in our sails; Cultivating joy in our purpose	

==== CACUSS Institutes ====
Similar to a conference, Institutes are offered over a period of several days, however they focus on a single theme or topic. They may be hosted by external or partnering affiliations. CACUSS provides detailed information on their upcoming events page. Institutes are an opportunity to develop skills or knowledge in a specific area related to student support and student affairs.

== Past Presidents ==
Years	Name
1973-1974	George McMahon, University of Windsor
1974-1975	Horace Beach
1975-1976	Treffle LaCombe/Elizabeth Chard
1976-1977	Bill Dick
1977-1978	Nelson Ferguson
1978-1979	Aurele Gagnon
1979-1980	Bill Stewart, Simon Fraser University
1980-1981	Sheila Scott
1981-1982	Dan Lee
1982-1983	Bob Willihnganz, University of Victoria
1983-1984	Georges Allard, U de Sherbrooke
1984-1985	Dave Morphy, University of Manitoba
1985-1986	Pat Donahoe, Dalhousie University
1986-1987	Paul Gilmor, University of Guelph
1987-1988	Bill Stewart, Simon Fraser University
1988-1990	David Jordan, Brock University
1990-1992	Dima Utgoff, Acadia University
1992-1994	Peggy Patterson, University of Guelph
1994-1996	Garth Wannan, University of Manitoba
1996-1998	Pam Broley, York University
1998-2000	Donna, Hardy-Cox, Memorial University
2000-2002	David McMurray, Wilfrid Laurier University
2002-2004	Heather Lane Vetere, University of Guelph
2004-2006	John Harnett, College of the North Atlantic
2006-2008	Rob Shea, Memorial University
2008-2010	Jim Delaney, University of Toronto
2010-2012	Chris McGrath, University of Toronto at Mississauga
2012-2014	Janet Mee, University of British Columbia
2014-2016	David L. E. Newman, University of Toronto
2016-2018	Patricia Pardo, Mount Royal University
2018-2019	Tim Rahilly, Simon Fraser University
2019-2020	Patricia Pardo, Mount Royal University
2020-2022	Mark Solomon, Seneca College
2022-2024	Patty Hambler, Douglas College

== Affiliations ==
CACUSS is an associate member of the Association of Universities and Colleges of Canada (AUCC) and a member of the Council for the Advancement of Standards in Higher Education (CAS).
