= University counseling center =

Mental health service for further education

A university counseling center (UCC) provides mental health and other services within a university or college environment. The need for these services is on the rise. Counseling center directors and other student affairs personnel have reported an increase in the mental health needs of college students, with issues like eating disorders, alcohol and drug abuse/dependence, severe depression/anxiety, suicidality, and sexual assault becoming more prevalent in this environment. Among Big Ten Conference universities, directors report a 42% increase in the number of students seen at their counseling centers. In a summary of recent survey data, Duenwald also reports that the use of psychiatric medication has increased almost 10% among college students since the year 2000. May (2003) finds that a UCC will typically work with 15-20% of students at colleges and 8-12% at a university. Given these numbers, May recommends 1 counselor per 600 students in colleges and a 1:1000 ratio in universities with an average of 5 to 6 sessions per student.

UCCs generally offer a variety of services including individual and group counseling, psychodiagnostic testing, alcohol and other drug counseling/evaluation, crisis assistance, campus outreach programs, consultation services, and graduate student training. Though services primarily target mental health problems (i.e., anxiety, depression), students also utilize counseling services to enhance areas of their life, including relationships, career/vocational choices, academic and athletic performance, and exploring psychological strengths. Lehigh University Counseling and Psychological Services (UCPS) is an example of a university counseling center.

Another example of a university counseling center is the University of California, Irvine Counseling Center. In addition to the services mentioned above, the center also offers Peer Programs. Peer Programs offered by the UCI Counseling Center include C.O.A.C.H, The Peer Educator Program, and the LGBTQ Mentorship Program. In these programs, students receive services not from licensed health professionals, but from other students at UCI who have assumed these helping roles. This is a different approach to counseling for students who find more comfort in speaking with fellow peers who they can more easily relate with. Each program has a different focus, whether it be group-based, individual-based, or special needs-based; but all have the same goal—to promote student mental health and well-being in all aspects of life.

in 2021, a study was released where campus counseling was found to not be as effective for students with disabilities and psychiatric disabilities.

== History ==
Early to mid 1940s: University counseling centers began formal operations, responding to the increasing educational and vocational needs of returning veterans of World War II.

1950: The Association of College Counseling Center Directors (AUCCCD) was established in 1950 by a group of mid-western college and university counseling directors. Dr. Ralph Birdie, director of the Student Counseling Bureau at the University of Minnesota, Minneapolis hosted the first conference on the UM campus. Annual meetings were hosted throughout the 1950s by several universities including the University of Illinois, Michigan State, The Ohio State University, State University of Iowa, University of Missouri, and the University of Minnesota. In the early days, the organization was referred to as the Annual Conference of college and University Counseling Directors. Conference attendance was based on invitation from participants and grew over time as directors around the country developed collegial relationships with each other. Initially membership was primarily drawn from mid-western institutions, but eventually the annual conference became a national affiliation of directors.

Following World War II, counseling centers were established in response to the educational and vocational needs of returning veterans. Directors were pioneering the development of organized counseling units and recognized their need to "talk shop" - to exchange information with each other and to develop a practical knowledge base on how to best to serve students. They gathered to discuss organizational issues, to share experience about how to work effectively with campus administration, and to discuss the nature of the work with students. An integral part of the annual meeting was the opportunity to develop and nourish collegial friendships through work and recreation in a restful setting.

Directors valued the opportunity to discuss confidential matters with their colleagues and trusted one another with sensitive details that they could not process with fellow administrators on their own campus. Directors were challenged with issues such as managing relations with campus administration and faculty who could be skeptical of the value of counseling students as well as issues related to the management of their staff. Conference attendance was restricted to directors with staffs of at least three full-time equivalents (FTE) in order to create a confidential environment for consultation.

The annual conference provided the opportunity for both formal and ad hoc presentations, roundtable discussions, and individual consultation. The group was loosely organized as a "non-organization" with a minimum of bureaucracy, and the pivotal activity was the annual meeting. A steering committee was elected annually to manage routine business, and a conference host was chosen from among competing institutions during the conference business meeting.

The formal structure of AUCCCD as we now know it developed slowly through the 1980s with the decision to revise the organization's By-laws and to incorporate as a non-profit organization. Throughout the 1990s several initiatives have been undertaken to develop a formal organizational structure to advance the business of AUCCCD as a national professional organization, and to put significant emphasis on advocating on behalf of counseling and psychological issues in higher education. Conference membership increased considerably after the 3 FTE restriction was lifted in the 1990s.

Membership in AUCCCD is institutional, with one director being selected to represent the member college or university. The group has experienced significant growth, with a current membership of 836 universities and colleges throughout the United States, Canada, and Europe and Asia.

1960s: As outpatient psychiatric clinics and services became more accessible to the general public, university counseling centers also began to provide standard psychological services to college students, including individual, couples, and group psychotherapy; vocational and personality assessment; consultative services to college administration, faculty, parents, and students; and crisis management among other services to the campus community.

1968: The Association of Psychology Postdoctoral and Internship Centers (APPIC) began formally coordinating pre-doctoral and post doctoral internships and jobs. Currently, there are 444 pre-doctoral internships listed through APPIC.

1978: The Association of Counseling Center Training Agencies (ACCTA) was established to coordinate the training objectives of university counseling centers, including creation and maintenance of pre-doctoral internship and practicum programs.
