= Electoral results for the district of Ross Smith =

South Australian district election results

This is a list of electoral results for the Electoral district of Ross Smith in South Australian elections.

== Members for Ross Smith ==
Member	Party	Term
Jack Jennings	Labor	1970–1977
John Bannon	Labor	1977–1993
Ralph Clarke	Labor	1993–2002

== Election results ==
=== Elections in the 1990s ===
1997 South Australian state election: Ross Smith
Party	Candidate	Votes	%	±%
Labor	Ralph Clarke	8,905	51.2	+9.7
Liberal	Danny McGuire	4,712	27.1	−14.8
Democrats	John Woods	3,055	17.6	+1.1
United Australia	David Shelly	704	4.1	+4.1
Total formal votes		17,376	95.2	−1.0
Informal votes		870	4.8	+1.0
Turnout		18,246	91.1	
Two-party-preferred result
Labor	Ralph Clarke	11,253	64.8	+12.7
Liberal	Danny McGuire	6,123	35.2	−12.7
Labor hold		Swing	+12.7	

1993 South Australian state election: Ross Smith
Party	Candidate	Votes	%	±%
Liberal	Steven Thomson	7,850	41.9	+9.7
Labor	Ralph Clarke	7,786	41.6	−16.2
Democrats	Matthew Mitchell	3,087	16.5	+6.5
Total formal votes		18,723	96.2	−0.4
Informal votes		740	3.8	+0.4
Turnout		19,463	92.9	
Two-party-preferred result
Labor	Ralph Clarke	9,761	52.1	−10.9
Liberal	Steven Thomson	8,962	47.9	+10.9
Labor hold		Swing	−10.9	

=== Elections in the 1980s ===
1989 South Australian state election: Ross Smith
Party	Candidate	Votes	%	±%
Labor	John Bannon	9,918	59.0	−6.9
Liberal	Christopher Pyne	5,297	31.5	+2.0
Democrats	Brian Fain	1,590	9.5	+4.9
Total formal votes		16,805	96.8	+0.7
Informal votes		559	3.2	−0.7
Turnout		17,364	94.6	+0.7
Two-party-preferred result
Labor	John Bannon	10,745	64.1	−4.6
Liberal	Christopher Pyne	6,023	35.9	+4.6
Labor hold		Swing	−4.6	

1985 South Australian state election: Ross Smith
Party	Candidate	Votes	%	±%
Labor	John Bannon	11,415	65.9	−1.1
Liberal	Darryl Watson	5,106	29.5	−1.5
Democrats	Kate Hannaford	790	4.6	+2.6
Total formal votes		17,311	96.1	
Informal votes		696	3.9	
Turnout		18,007	93.9	
Two-party-preferred result
Labor	John Bannon	11,895	68.7	+0.7
Liberal	Darryl Watson	5,416	31.3	−0.7
Labor hold		Swing	+0.7	

1982 South Australian state election: Ross Smith
Party	Candidate	Votes	%	±%
Labor	John Bannon	10,200	75.7	+11.1
Liberal	Ruth Squire	3,284	24.4	−2.5
Total formal votes		13,484	90.4	−3.1
Informal votes		1,427	9.6	+3.1
Turnout		14,911	92.3	−0.5
Labor hold		Swing	+7.2	

=== Elections in the 1970s ===
1979 South Australian state election: Ross Smith
Party	Candidate	Votes	%	±%
Labor	John Bannon	8,997	64.6	−7.6
Liberal	Ruth Squire	3,746	26.9	−0.9
Democrats	Margaret-Ann Williams	1,179	8.5	+8.5
Total formal votes		13,922	93.5	−2.7
Informal votes		961	6.5	+2.7
Turnout		14,883	92.8	−1.4
Two-party-preferred result
Labor	John Bannon	9,522	68.4	−3.8
Liberal	Ruth Squire	4,400	31.6	+3.8
Labor hold		Swing	−3.8	

1977 South Australian state election: Ross Smith
Party	Candidate	Votes	%	±%
Labor	John Bannon	10,773	72.2	+7.2
Liberal	Paul Baloglou	4,156	27.8	+9.2
Total formal votes		14,929	96.2	
Informal votes		594	3.8	
Turnout		15,523	94.2	
Labor hold		Swing	+4.7	

1975 South Australian state election: Ross Smith
Party	Candidate	Votes	%	±%
Labor	Jack Jennings	9,458	65.0	−15.3
Liberal	James Porter	2,703	18.6	+18.6
Liberal Movement	Noel Hodges	2,391	16.4	+16.4
Total formal votes		14,552	93.9	+1.0
Informal votes		947	6.1	−1.0
Turnout		15,499	93.1	−1.5
Two-party-preferred result
Labor	Jack Jennings	9,692	66.6	−13.7
Liberal	James Porter	4,860	33.4	+33.4
Labor hold		Swing	N/A	

1973 South Australian state election: Ross Smith
Party	Candidate	Votes	%	±%
Labor	Jack Jennings	11,102	80.3	+12.2
Independent	John Lynch	2,720	19.7	+19.7
Total formal votes		13,822	92.9	−4.7
Informal votes		1,057	7.1	4.7
Turnout		14,879	94.6	−0.9
Labor hold		Swing	N/A	

1970 South Australian state election: Ross Smith
Party	Candidate	Votes	%	±%
Labor	Jack Jennings	9,668	68.1	
Liberal and Country	Frank Forwood	3,617	25.5	
Independent	Roy Amer	903	6.4	
Total formal votes		14,188	97.6	
Informal votes		350	2.4	
Turnout		14,538	95.5	
Two-party-preferred result
Labor	Jack Jennings	10,119	71.3	
Liberal and Country	Frank Forwood	4,069	28.7	
Labor hold		Swing		
