= Prosh =

Prosh may refer to:

- Prosh (University of Western Australia)
- Prosh (University of Adelaide)
- University of Melbourne Prosh Week
- Prosh (Marvel Comics), fictional character

== See also ==
- Prosh Khaghbakian (Prince Prosh), founder of the Proshyan dynasty in Armenia
- Prosh Proshian (1883–1918), Armenian revolutionary
- Eric Prosh (1957–2013), Canadian paleontologist
