= Vincent Smith =

Vincent Smith may refer to:

- Vince Powell (1928–2009), born Vincent Smith, television writer
- Vin Smith (1913–1995), Australian footballer
- Vince Smith (politician) (1938–2008), Australian politician
- Vince Smith (boxer), English boxer
- Vincent Smith (Chuck)
- Vincent Smith (American football) (born 1990), American football player
- Vince Smith (cybertaxonomist)
- Vincent Smith (politician) (born 1960), South African politician
- Vincent Smith (television presenter) (1943–1991), Australian journalist and broadcaster
- Vincent Arthur Smith (1848–1920), Irish-born Indologist, historian and art historian
- Vincent D. Smith (1929–2003) American artist, teacher, painter and printmaker known for his vivid and colorful depictions of Black life
- Vincent Powell-Smith (1939–1997), British barrister and author
- Vincent Reynolds Smith (1890–1960), judge and politician in Saskatchewan, Canada
- Vinnie Smith (1915–1979), baseball player
