= Jim Macartney =

Western Australian journalist and newspaper editor

James Edward Macartney (15 July 1911 – 21 September 1977) was an Australian newspaper editor and executive from Perth, Western Australia. He served for periods as editor of the Daily News and The West Australian, and was later managing director of West Australian Newspapers Ltd. (WAN) from 1962 to 1969.

Macartney was born in Coolgardie, Western Australia, to Constance May (née Griffith) and Edward Hussey Burgh Macartney. His father, a surveyor, was a grandson of Hussey Macartney, a long-serving Dean of Melbourne. Macartney attended The High School in Perth, and went on to the University of Western Australia, where he edited two student publications, Sruss-Sruss and Pelican. He was sent down from the university after antagonising its authorities.

Macartney joined The West Australian in 1928, and the following year he was made a cadet reporter. In 1934, he was made editor of the Broadcaster, a new weekly magazine published by WAN (the parent company of The West Australian). Two years later, WAN bought the Daily News, and Macartney became its editor. He remained in the position until 1951, although he took a leave of absence from 1942 to 1945 to serve in the Royal Australian Air Force. He reached the rank of flight lieutenant, and spent periods with the No. 67 and No. 42 Squadrons, flying Avro Ansons and Catalinas in the South-West Pacific.

In 1951, Macartney was appointed managing editor of West Australian Newspapers and chief editor of The West Australian, replacing the long-serving Charles Patrick Smith. He left the latter post in 1956, but in 1962 was appointed WAN managing director, serving in that position until 1969. During his involvement with WAN, which had a virtual monopoly on the newspaper market in Western Australia, Macartney largely had his papers adopt right-wing positions, advocating free enterprise policies and supporting Australia's involvement in Vietnam. In 1952, he circumvented restrictions on media coverage of Operation Hurricane (a nuclear test in the Montebello Islands) by sending a team to a remote location near the Rough Range, which was able to capture the only press photographs of the event.

After leaving WAN, Macartney began working as a consultant for STW Channel 9. He was employed in other consulting roles until his death from cancer in September 1977.

Macartney had been married twice, firstly in 1932 to Edith Flanagan, with whom he had three children. He was divorced in 1941, and remarried to Margaret Bessell-Browne (née Bennett) in 1946, with whom he had another two children.
