= Student orientation =

Period before the start of an academic year

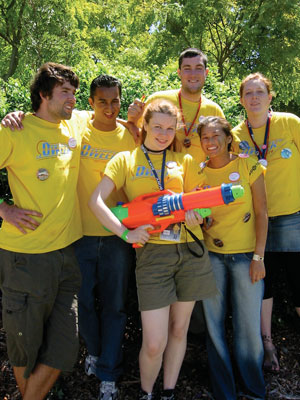
O-Week tour leaders at the University of New South Wales, Sydney, Australia, 2004

Student orientation or new student orientation (often encapsulated into an orientation week, o-week, frosh week, welcome week or freshers' week) is a period before the start of an academic year at a university or tertiary institutions. A variety of events are held to orient and welcome new students during this period. The name of the event differs across institutions. Post-secondary institutions offer a variety of programs to help orient first year students. These programs can range from voluntary community building activities (frosh week) to mandatory credit-based courses designed to support students academically, socially, and emotionally. Some of these programs occur prior to the start of classes while other programs are offered throughout the school year. A number of research studies have been done to determine the factors to be considered when designing orientation/transition programs.

Although usually described as a week, the length of this period varies widely from university to university and country to country, ranging from about three days to a month or even more (e.g. up to five weeks at Swedish institutions such as Chalmers and KTH). The length of the week is often affected by each university's tradition as well as financial and physical constraints. Additionally, institutions may include programming in the summer months before the first-year to aid in the transition. Some programs may be audience-specific, such as international orientation, transfer student orientation, graduate student orientation.

Orientation programming, regardless of length or format, aims to introduce students to both the academic and social aspects of an institution as they transition from high school. For institutions that have enhanced their orientations to serve as a comprehensive transition program, learning outcomes are developed to assess success. CAS Professional Standards for Higher Education provide objectives for what Orientation programs should aim to accomplish. In North America, organizations exist to share practices that are built upon these outcomes. Two prominent organizations are NODA-Association for Orientation, Transition, and Retention in Higher Education and the Canadian Association Colleges and Universities Student Services (CACUSS), which has Orientation, Transition and Retention Community of Practice. The CACUSS community of practice specifically serves as a network for student affairs professionals to share best practices, research, and trends seen at Canadian institutions.

== Terminology ==
The week before the term starts is known as: Frosh (or frosh week) in some colleges and universities in Canada. In the US, most call it by the acronym SOAR for Student Orientation And Registration; Freshers' week in the majority of the United Kingdom and Ireland and Orientation week or O-week in countries such as Australia, South Africa and New Zealand, and also in many Canadian universities. In Sweden, it is known as nollning (from nolla, 'zero', in this case meaning the students have not earned any credit points yet) or inspark (being 'kicked in' to university life). Orientation week is the common phrase in the United States. Some schools use the acronym WOW for Week of Welcome.

In Canada, first-year students are called "frosh" or "first-years", although the term frosh has been phased out as orientations have become dry events. The terms freshies and freshers are also emerging. In the United States, first-year university students are typically referred to as freshmen. In Australia and New Zealand, first-year students are known simply as "first-years", although in some the colleges of the University of Melbourne and the University of Sydney they are also called "freshers". In the U.K. and Ireland, first-year students are known as freshers or first-years. Freshies is also an emerging term in New Zealand. In Sweden, the student is a nolla (a 'zero') during the orientation period and usually upgraded to the status of an etta (student who is in her/his first college term) at a ceremony involving a fancy three-course dinner and much singing.

== History of student orientation ==
In modern society, student orientation programs are meant to guide and assist students with their transition into post-secondary. Each institution follows different activities to welcome, transition and assist students in their transition to a new educational experience. Although it seems like every institution has some sort of student orientation they were only developed in 1888 at Boston University. They were created by faculty in an attempt to ensure that students understood the role of a student in academia. These faculty members were predominantly the driving force behind student orientation programs until the 1920s. From 1920-onwards a shift in the development of these orientation practices occurred. Administration at the institutions began to work towards the development. In Canada, this shift happened much later due to the 1960s and 1970s as orientation functions were developed and created by student governments. Specifically, between the 1960s and 1970s, deans acting in the role in loco parentis, were focused on orientation, transition and retention programs that soon became fundamental to higher education institutions. In 1948, directors, administration, and presidents met for the first time to discuss the student orientation. From this meeting the National Orientation Directors Association (NODA) was developed.

In Canada, this shift happened much later due to the 1960s and 1970s, orientation functions were developed and created by student governments. In the 1980s this shift continued to orientation programming being completed by student affairs professionals as a way to eliminate risks associated with students developed practices. Like the United States, orientation programming was used by higher education institutions to focus on transition and retention. In Canada, information, research and data around orientation programming is shared at conferences such as CACUSS.

== Purpose of student orientation ==
Many orientation programs aim to provide students with the tools that they will need to be successful within their academic career, such as acquainting them with their campus and the academic supports available to them, as well as providing them with opportunities to meet their fellow students and build meaningful connections.

The overall message of getting familiar with the learning environment and institution has remained the same. The goals of the orientation programs are to create student's familiarity with the institution's regulations and academic standards, acquaint the students with their classmates and to learn about the other institutional members that will help students succeed.

Orientation programs also serve the purpose of introducing students to rules and policies that can help keep them safe. Legislation in different North American states and provinces has led to programming that addresses consent, gendered violence, and the introduction of the campus sexual assault policy.

== Around the world ==
=== Australia ===
In Australia, some universities require students to arrive at university a week before classes start in order to gain course approval. This also allows students a chance to orient themselves to student life without the pressure of lectures—hence the term Orientation week is used to describe this week of induction into university life.

In Australian universities, such as the University of Melbourne, University of New South Wales and University of Sydney, the last or second last night is usually celebrated with a large-scale event such as a famous band playing at an entertainment venue on campus. This is generally followed by continued partying and drinking.

The University of Adelaide O-Week runs from Monday to Thursday in the week before lectures begin. During O-Week sporting clubs and societies set up a variety of tented areas where clubs display their activities. The Adelaide University Union coordinates a variety of events centering around beer, bands and barbecues on the lawns near the Union complex. A major event for the week is the O-Ball (live entertainment and licensed areas) which takes place in the Cloisters (Union House). The O-Ball attracts many thousands of revellers, not all of whom are Adelaide University students. In recent times Sports and Clubs have sought to distance themselves from the student union and student association controlled activities and have set themselves up on the Maths lawns.

The Australian National University has a full week (Sunday to Sunday) of events, parties and social activities open to all students of the university, organised by the Australian National University Students Association. The residential colleges often have their own O-week activities catered primarily for residents as well as the annual Burgmann Toga Party held at Burgmann College open to students from all residential colleges. Burgmann Toga is the largest party held at a university residence in the Southern Hemisphere.

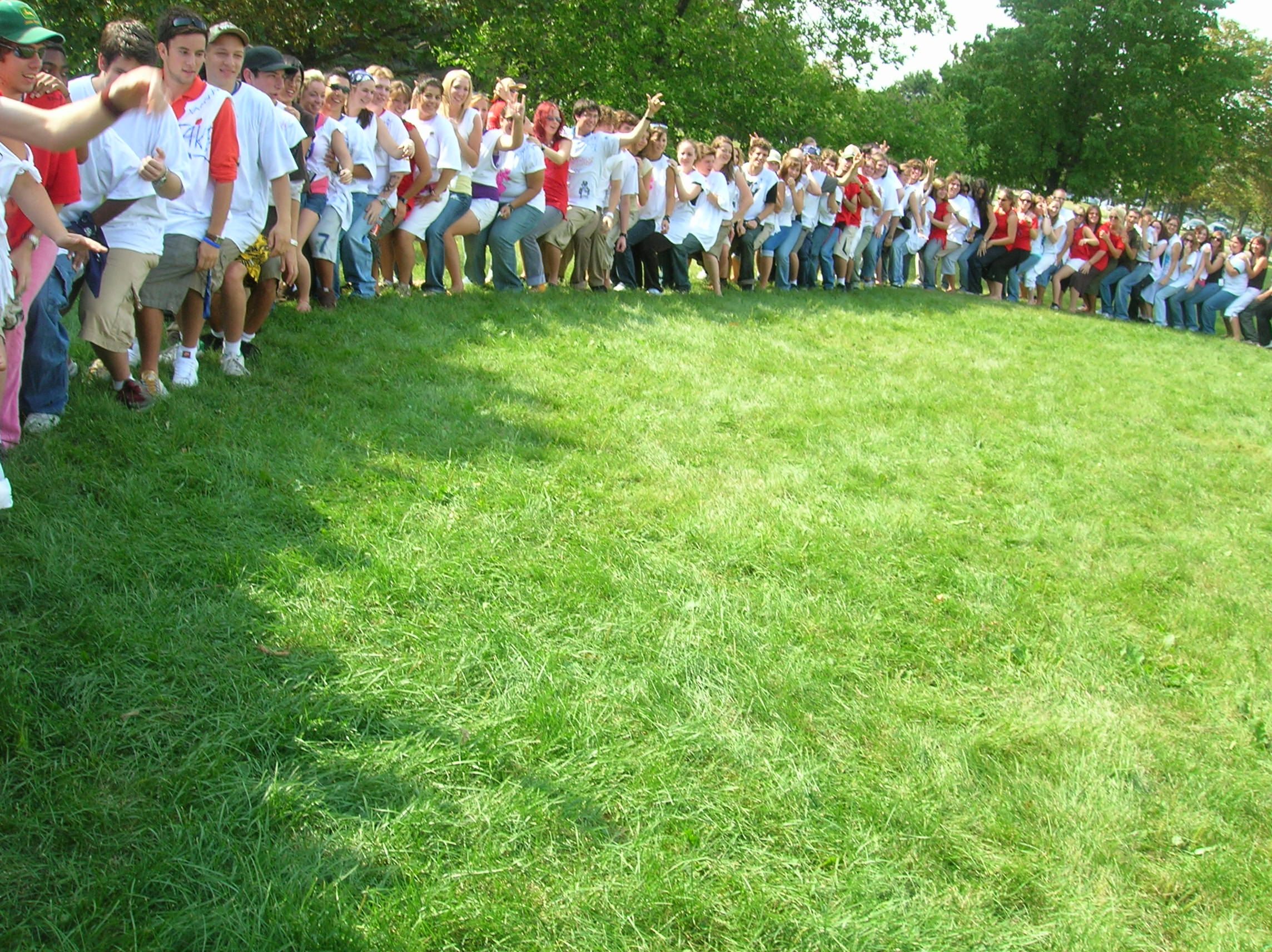
Winters College Frosh Students and Bosses playing icebreakers during O-Week at York University, Toronto, Ontario, Canada, 2006

=== Canada ===
In Canada, there is a large variety of student orientation programming offered by Canadian institutions. Some institutions have their Orientation programming run by the student union, by student groups, by university staff, or a combination. The duration and complexity of programs to support the transition for students as they enter post-secondary institutions can vary quite drastically depending on the institution. Below are some examples of the kind of structure and programming provided by some Canadian universities:

- Ottawa, has two universities within its urban centre; the University of Ottawa and Carleton University, both with orientations spanning approximately seven days. At the University of Ottawa, Frosh Week is called 101 week. At Carleton University there are multiple orientations, SPROSH (Sprott Frosh), ENG Frosh, Radical Frosh, and the largest, CUSA/RRRA/SEO Frosh. In the province of Quebec, because of the CEGEP system, "froshies" are of legal drinking age and Frosh activities may include the option to drink alcohol. Moreover, the proximity of the two Ottawa universities also allows them to take advantage of the drinking age in neighbouring Gatineau, Quebec.
- The University of British Columbia cancels the first day of class for all students, and hosts an orientation day for new students, called Imagine Day. As of 2007, the Faculty of Science also holds an annual, day-long Science Frosh event for approximately 300 first-year students, while the commerce faculty holds a three-day-long frosh weekend before classes begin.
- The University of Toronto has a number of different "Frosh Weeks" organized concurrently by different student groups within the university; including college societies, professional faculties (perhaps the best known being organized by Engineering Society, Skule (engineering society), in which 'F!ROSH' and 'F!ROSH Leedurs' dye their bodies purple) and the University of Toronto Students' Union.
- Toronto Metropolitan University (the former Ryerson University) also has a number of "Frosh Weeks" organized by different student groups, although it also has a central frosh team known as the 'TMU Orientation Crew'. At the Friday of frosh week, the TMU Students' Union holds a concert that is free for all TMU students; the headliners for the 2015 concert included Drake and Future.
- McMaster University also organizes many events during what they term "Welcome Week". The week strongly encourages solidarity, first with members of one's own residence or for off-campus students, and later the members of a student's faculty.
- University of Guelph holds hundreds of orientation activities for its incoming students. These events are run by student clubs, academic groups, the undergraduate student union, along with university staff and faculty. Their main events include Move-In Day programming, large-scale informational events promoting campus safety, and the Pep Rally in which students from each residence perform a dance on the football field. The Guelph Engineering Society also hosts a series of special events for Engineering Frosh including frosh olympics, beach day, and a scavenger hunt.
- Western University hosts the largest orientation program in Canada, involving 1200 student volunteers and an entire week of activities.
- St Thomas University, in Fredericton, New Brunswick, hosts a week-long event including activities for each residence and activities for new students.
- Queen's University hosts an optional Frosh week, in which students will bond through various activities, such as chants and numerous traditions such as graduated students returning to watch, as well as consume excessive amounts of alcohol.
- University of Waterloo has a week-long orientation with classes incorporated. Students participate in programs run by each of the six faculties, as well as centralized events with all of the first-year students. The university also runs additional orientations for international students, transfer students, exchange students, out-of-province students and graduate orientation.
- The Royal Military College of Canada has a three week orientation program, called First Year Orientation Program (FYOP) for students who have completed the initial phase of the BMOQ (Basic Military Officer Qualification). During this period, first year students will undergo mentally and physically straining tasks in order to obtain their cap brass and replace the Canadian Armed Forces issued cap brass. After the three weeks, students will complete the obstacle course around campus in which students will be pushed to the limit to complete it with their flights. After this, First Year students will go on parade to receive their RMC cap brasses, as well as receive their challenge coins with their student numbers.
- The Royal Military College Saint-Jean goes through a similar program to RMCC. Where the core of FYOP is the same, but is reduced down from three weeks to two weeks. The same activities are conducted.

Orientation programming is often available for all levels of study; it is generally thought of as something primarily for undergraduate students but many institutions will at least provide some kind of informational Orientation for their graduate level students. International students are likely to also have their own Orientation - in addition to general Orientation - where they are provided with information about life in Canada as an international student.

=== Denmark ===
At Roskilde University in Denmark, orientation week (in Danish rusvejledning) normally lasts from one and a half weeks to two whole weeks. During the period, approximately 14 teams consisting of 10–16 tutors each take care of an individual house to which the new students have been allocated. There is normally one house of Natural Sciences, four of Social Studies and Economics, four houses of Arts and Language and two of technology and design. Each of the first three houses described has an International version as well, where the courses are taught in English instead of Danish.

Each tutor group spends roughly fourteen days (and three to five days of pre-education in the spring semester) living on campus before the arrival of the new students (also called ruslings). These periods usually involve heavy amounts of drinking, partying and sexual activity among the tutors themselves. However most festive activities including alcohol only occur after 4 p.m. due to the alcohol policies of the university. Because of this policy, most daily activity is spent planning and preparing activities for the new students.

When the students arrive all tutor groups welcome the ruslings with the infamous Marbjergmark show – usually a display of wacky sketches such as naked people playing chess, smashing rotten eggs at bystanders or themselves or men chasing midgets with a butcher's knife (to name a few examples).

During the two-week period the tutor group teach and introduce the new students to life on campus, both the social and educational aspects. As it is with the preparation period, festive activities take place after 4 p.m., and educational activities are held during the day.

The two-week period ends in a four-day period in which the house will leave campus to varied destinations. During these days mostly social activities are held, including the more secret hazing rituals of the university.

The tutors uphold a strict set of rules to maintain a safe and pleasant tutorship to prevent harmful and humiliating hazing rituals. Examples are the presence of minimum two sober tutors at each party (in Danish ædruvagter). Engaging in sexual relations with new students is also strongly discouraged. Also, it is generally not seen as appropriate to force people to drink alcohol through various games and activities. Furthermore, the university dictates that each tutor must be taught basic first aid, as well as a couple of courses in conflict management and basic education psychology.

At DTU (Danish Faculty of Technology and Engineering), Copenhagen Business School and Copenhagen University, similar periods are held. They however vary, and are significantly shorter than the overall orientation period at Roskilde University.

=== Finland ===
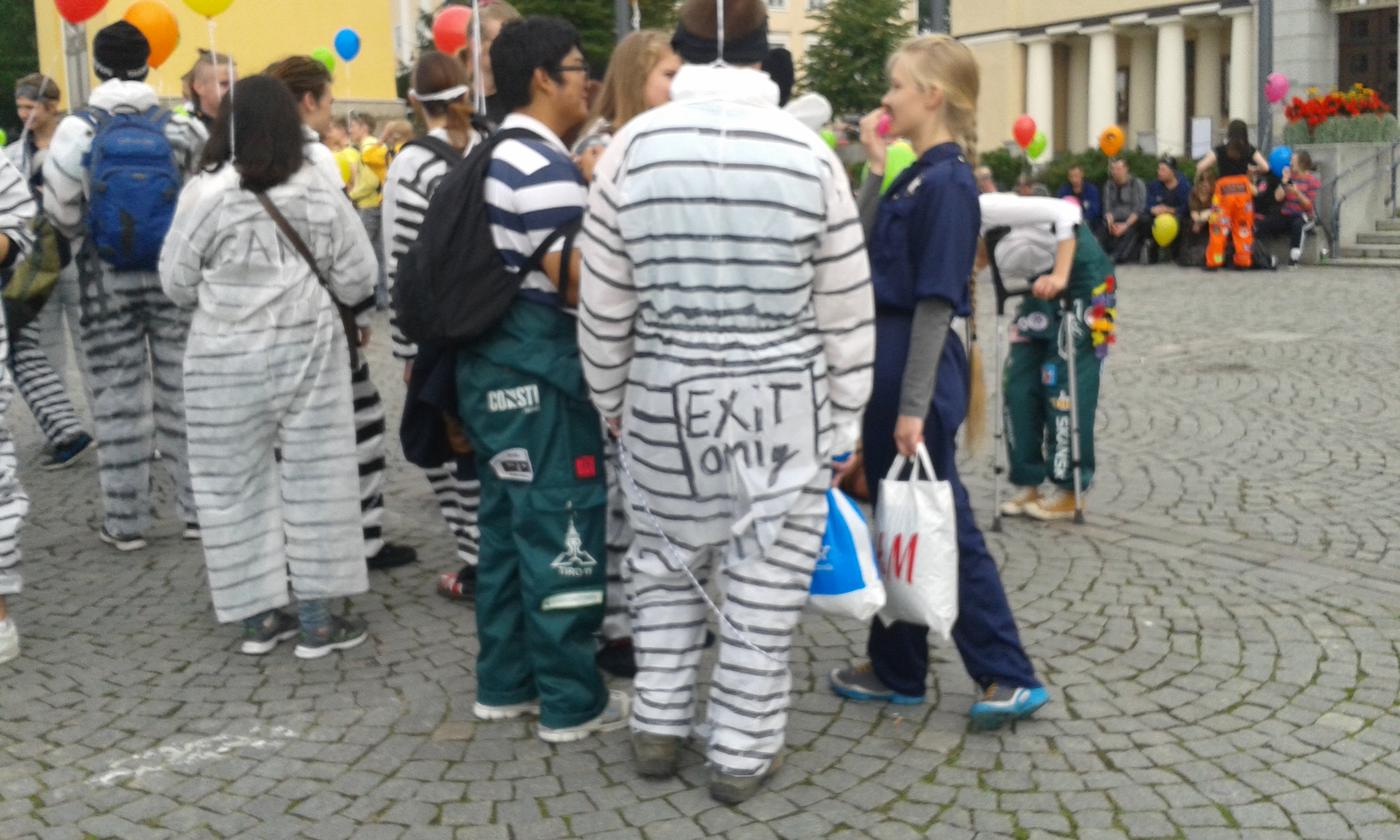
First-year fuksi (tursas) student orientation, Tampere University of Applied Sciences, Finland, 2014

In Finnish universities, the student organizations for each department independently organize orientation activities for the new students in their respective departments. New students are often assigned in groups to an upperclassman tutor and participate in many activities with their tutoring group. New students may be referred to as piltti ('child'), fuksi ('freshman'), fetus or other names according to their major subject. Activities for new students may include "orienteering", pub crawls, sporting events, swimming in fountains or other forms of "baptism", sitsit parties and saunas, often done wearing homemade fancy-dress costumes. It is also considered important for the new students to participate in the regular activities of the student department organizations.

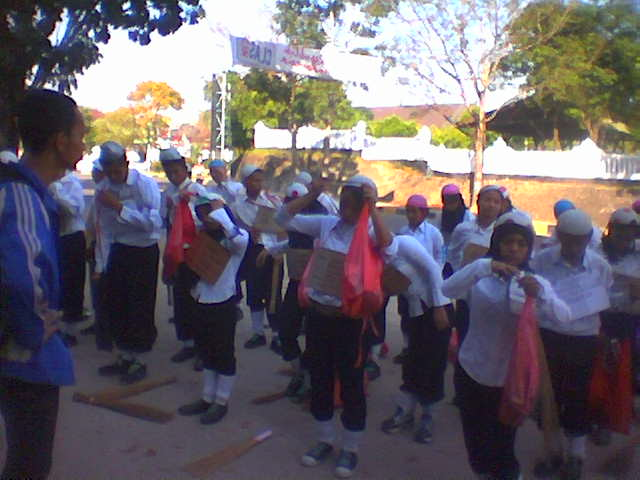
Indonesia student orientation better known as OSPEK (Student Orientation and Campus Introduction)

=== Indonesia ===
In past years a typical orientation may consist of verbal harassment as well as initiation leading to humiliation. An orientation of freshers in Indonesia is usually called OSPEK (Orientasi Studi dan Pengenalan Kampus) for some universities and MOS (Masa Orientasi Sekolah) in middle and high school. Orientations in Indonesia have event organizers consisting of seniors and the presidium of universities. The most basic form of orientation in Indonesia consists of an educational board run and introduction to campus cultural behavior. What makes orientation in Indonesia (for some universities and schools) distinctive to other countries would arguably be the freshmens' requirement to wear unusual accessories or hairstyles (i.e. freshmen were asked to wear hats made of bird's nests, neckties made of folded paper, military hairstyles for male students or intricate braids for females, and the usage of a sack instead of a rucksack). Harsh physical punishments were not uncommon during the Suharto era, and mass media continues to report inhumane activities during those orientations that led to a few cases of death.

Nowadays, however, orientation is more tolerable as physical abuse is now forbidden by law; however, it is still criticized by many psychologists and people as 'too much' because of excessive verbal harassment and the use of unusual and humiliating attributes typically found in orientations in junior high and high schools. As well, it is also criticized by many parents for being economically inconvenient. The reason cited by psychologists is that orientation is often used as a tool of revenge by the board of organizers for what the seniors did to them during their freshman year. Because of this, there are many people who believe that MOS or OSPEK are useless traditions that need to be erased. The cruelty of MOS and OSPEK varies between universities and schools in Indonesia, although in (most) major universities and institutes, that kind of humiliation and harassment no longer exists, or is greatly limited to pending applicants or pledges for certain campus organizations.

=== New Zealand ===
As in Australia, in New Zealand students have a week to orient themselves to university life before the start of formal classes. This orientation week is a time for many social events, and is often a reason for alcohol fests. Flat warmings are often held within the time limit to couple the alcohol oriented event with the general party week.

In New Zealand's main university towns such as Dunedin and Palmerston North (where students make up around one fifth of the population) orientation week leads a wide range of events. Many top overseas and local bands tour the country at this time, and the orientation tour is one of the highlights of the year's music calendar. The University of Otago in the Scottish-settled city of Dunedin traditionally holds a parody of the Highland Games called the Lowland Games, including such esoteric events as porridge wrestling.

Student pranks were once common during orientation week, but have fallen out of favour in recent years. Until recent years, many halls of residence also inducted new residents with "Initiation" (a form of hazing, though considerably milder than the rituals found among American college fraternities).

Although officially designated as a week, in several New Zealand universities and polytechnics orientation week stretches to over ten days.

=== Sweden ===
Most Swedish universities have some kind of nollning ('zeroing') or inspark ('kicking-in'). This is most extensive at the technical faculties and at the student nation communities of Uppsala and Lund. Since student union membership was mandatory in Sweden (until July 2010), the nollning is usually centrally organized from the student union with support from the universities.

At the old universities, these traditions have often turned civilized after a dark history of hazing. Today, many student unions have strict rules against inappropriate drunkenness, sexual harassment and other problematic behaviour.

At the technical faculties, the people who organize the nollning play roles in a theatrical manner and often wear sunglasses and some form of weird clothes. Most senior students who are mentors during the nollning wear their student boilersuits or the b-frack (a worn tailcoat). This kind of organized nollning developed at KTH and Chalmers and spread to the rest of the country.

=== Thailand ===
In Thailand, the activity is commonly called rapnong (รับน้อง), translated as 'welcoming of freshmen'. It takes place in the first week or month of the academic year at universities and some high schools. The purpose is to adapt new students to university culture. Activities include games, entertainment and recreation. These let the newcomers get to know other members of the university and reduce tension in the changing environment. It sometimes includes alcohol. The main object is to let juniors carry on the universities' tradition and identity and to bind together the new generation into one. Long-term activity often includes seniors taking freshman or older years to meals and meetings; usually the most senior pays for it all. Hazing is a concern in this activity, as many students have been humiliated, abused, and dehumanized by their upperclassmen.

For over 50 years, SOTUS – a hazing-based system used for college initiation in Thailand – has been involved in Thai universities. It stands for Seniority, Order, Tradition, Unity, and Spirit. It is the system for freshmen to bring harmony to their friends and to show their pride through their institute. By seniors, freshmen have to do activities such as singing university songs. Moreover, freshmen are required to do a lot of things, for example, wearing a name tag and showing respect to seniors. These requirements lead seniors to try to make their juniors do what they desire and punish them if they do not follow seniors' orders.

In Thai society, news related to this system has been reported almost every year, for example, recent news about a male freshman who died in this tradition. This news has resulted in people thinking that rapnong should end or, at least, be controlled.

In 2016, GMMTV made a television series based on this system, called SOTUS: The Series starring Perawat Sangpotirat and Prachaya Ruangroj.

=== United Kingdom and Ireland ===
As well as providing a chance to learn about the university, freshers' week allows students to become familiar with the representatives of their Student Union and to get to know the city or town which is home to the university, often through some form of pub crawl.

Live music is also common, as are a number of organized social gatherings especially designed to allow freshers to make new friends and to get to know their course colleagues. Because of the intensity of activities, there are often many new friendships made, especially in group accommodation, some not lasting past Freshers' Week and others lasting for the whole University career and longer.

Typically a freshers' fair for student clubs and societies is included as part of the activities to introduce new students to facilities on offer, typically outside their course of study, such as societies, clubs and sports. The various societies and clubs available within the university have stalls and aim to entice freshers to join. Most campuses take the opportunity to promote safe sex to their students and sometimes offer leaflets on the subject and free condoms, as well as promoting the Drinksafe campaign. The aim is to lower the rate of sexually transmitted disease and to reduce the level of intoxication commonly witnessed in freshers' week.

Freshers' flu is a predominately British term which describes the increased rates of illness during the first few weeks of university. Although called freshers' flu, it is often not a flu at all.

=== United States ===
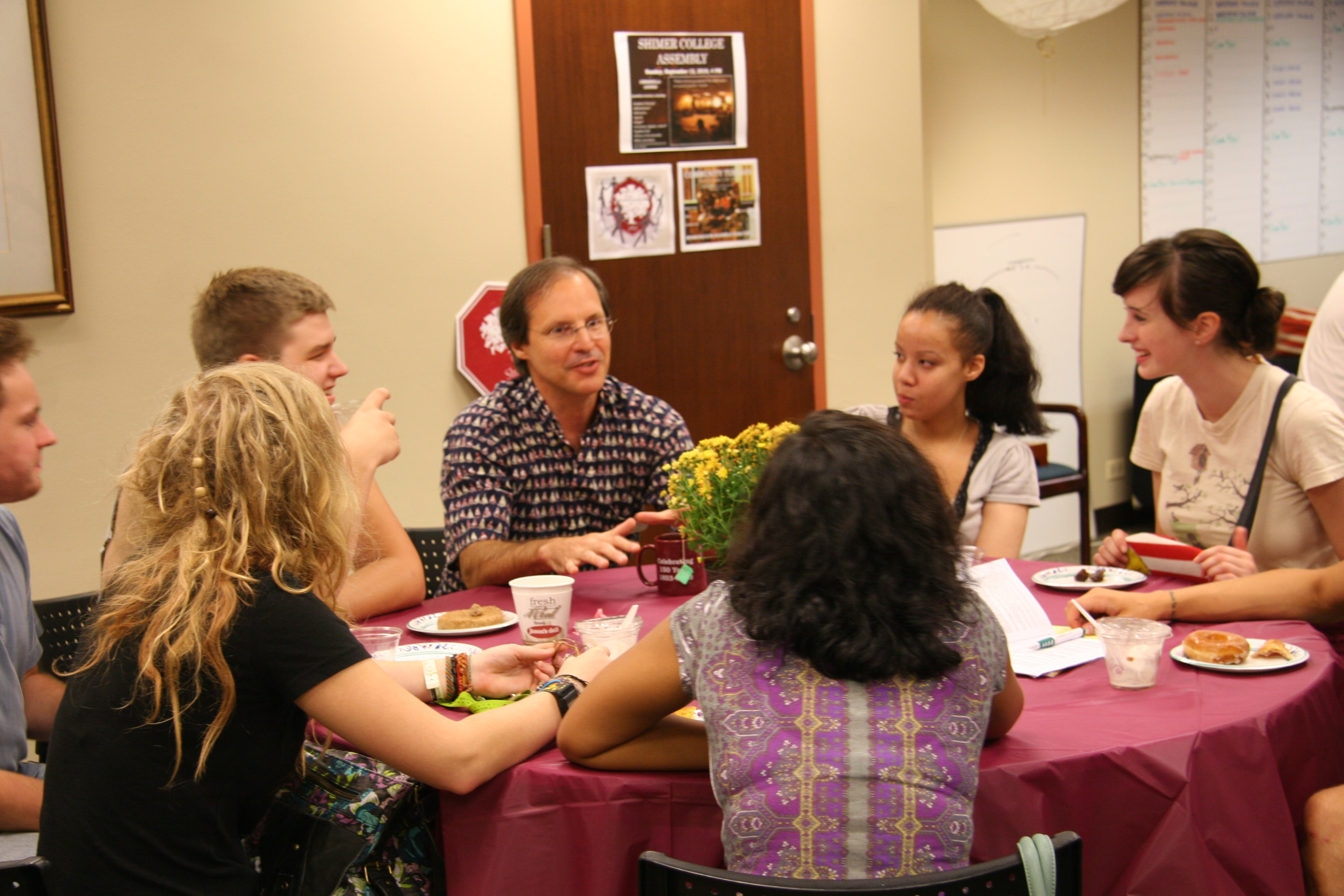
Students and professor in conversation during orientation at Shimer College.

Freshmen is the traditional term for first-year students arriving at school in the United States, but the slang term frosh is also used. Due to the perceived gender exclusiveness of the term, some institutions including the University of North Carolina have adopted first-year student as the preferred nomenclature. Lasting between a few days and a week, the orientation is these students' informal introduction and inauguration to the institution. Typically, the first-year students are led by fellow students from upper years over the course of the week through various events ranging from campus tours, games, competitions, and field trips. At smaller liberal arts colleges, the faculty may also play a central role in orientation.

In many colleges, incoming freshmen are made to perform activities such as singing of songs, engaging in group physical activities, and playing games. These activities are often done to help freshmen make friends at their new establishment, and also to bond with each other and the upperclassmen.

Despite the fact that most first-year students are below the legal drinking age (currently 21 years in all states), heavy drinking and binge drinking may occur outside the orientation curriculum. Some programs require their organizers to sign waivers stating they will not be under the influence of any substances over the course of the week as they are responsible for the well-being of the students. Most programs have one final party on the final night to finish off the week of celebrating, in which the organizers join in.

Although it has been officially banned at many schools, hazing is not uncommon during the week. This can be anywhere from the organizers treating the first-year students in a playfully discouraging manner to forcing them to endure rigorous trials.

The attitude of the events also depends on the school. Many colleges encourage parents to come to the first day to help new students move into their dormitory, fill out paper work, and get situated. Some schools view their week as an initiation or rite of passage while others view it as a time to build school spirit and pride. In towns with more than one university, there may be a school rivalry that is reflected in the events throughout the week.

At most schools, incoming freshmen arrive at the school for a couple of days during the summer and are put into orientation groups led by an upperclassman trained for the position. Their orientation leader will take them around campus, do activities with them, have discussions with them, help them register for the next semester's classes and make them feel comfortable about coming to school in the fall.

Freshmen orientation is usually mandatory for all new students, especially international students, which is one way to activate the status of their visa.

==== United States transfer student orientation ====
After first-year students have completed some time at their university, they may find that they did not make the right choice, miss being close to home, or simply want to attend a different institution. When this occurs, they may transfer to another university, usually after their first year. Many other students transfer to four-year institutions after completing an associate degree at a community college. A smaller number of students transfer as part of a dual degree program (such as a 3-2 engineering program).

Many universities will hold another student orientation similar to freshman orientation for these transfer students. Freshman orientation lasts a few days or a week; on the other hand, transfer student orientation will typically last between one and three days. Transfer orientation's purpose is to acquaint transfer students with their new university. This usually includes campus tours, introducing transfer students to their adviser or perhaps a few of their teachers, and filling out paperwork for proper enrollment. At some colleges, transfer orientation is mandatory for all transfer students.

Unlike freshmen, transfer students are already familiar with the independence of college life. Therefore, their orientation focuses mostly on becoming familiar with the layout and policies of their new institution, providing information about essential campus resources, and getting acquainted with other transfer students so they may make friends at their new university. Transfer students may engage in games, conversations with University faculty, and discussions with current students to make acquaintances and learn more about the university.

== See also ==
- Endurance game
