= On Dit =

- Editors: Leia Vlahos, Lavica Wu, and Libby Hoffmann
- Categories: Student magazine
- Frequency: Quarterly
- First issue: 1932
- Company: Adelaide University Student Association
- Based in: Adelaide, Australia
- Language: English
- Website: On Dit

On Dit is a student magazine published quarterly during semester time, funded by the Adelaide University Student Association. Founded in 1932, it is the equal fifth oldest student publication in Australia, behind Farrago (printed 1925), Honi Soit (printed 1929), Pelican (printed 1930) and Togatus (printed 1931). Semper Floreat was first published in the same year as On Dit. The paper replaced the Varsity Ragge which ran from 1928 to 1931, ending because of what On Dit described in its first edition as 'student apathy'. The Varsity Ragge returned in 1934 for a single edition as a rival to On Dit.

== Name ==
On-dit (French pronunciation: [ɔ̃ di]) is a term for hearsay; its most literal translation is "one says," but French uses on similarly to the generic use of "they" in English. This is why less literal translations ("so I hear," "what people are saying," "rumour," "they say," "we say," "people say") may be more appropriate. In protest against French nuclear testing in the Pacific, in 1972 the editors refused to use the paper's original French-language title and substituted Heresay [sic].

== History ==
The newspaper began as a two-page broadsheet but within a few years quickly grew to four pages. The first editors were C. R. Badger (Arts), K. L. Litchfield (Law) and C. G. Kerr (Arts), who published the first edition on 15 April 1932. In its early years, On Dit focused mainly on the activities and happenings of clubs and societies at the North Terrace campus of the University of Adelaide.

From the beginning, the newspaper attracted the ire of the university administration. Its very first editorial criticised certain regulations of the Barr Smith Library – criticism not well received at the time. On Dit's editorial team in its fifth year of existence, Helen Wighton and Finlay Crisp, later married.

One of the paper's first successes was its campaign, in 1936, for a student-elected head of the Adelaide University Union.

The paper ceased publication in 1941 due to World War II, but resumed again in 1944.

While the paper charged a low price to its readers in its first decades, it switched to free distribution in the 1960s and remains so to this day, supporting itself with advertising and funds from the AUU. In its early years it was an organ of the Student Representative Council, which later became the Students' Association of the University of Adelaide (a body which did not survive voluntary student unionism (VSU), and therefore has since been replaced by the Adelaide University Student Representative Council). Today, On Dit is a publication of the Adelaide University Union.

During the 1950s and 1960s the paper attempted to resemble a professionally designed newspaper. This evolved into the Dynasty era during the 1970s and 1980s. During the latter period, the paper broke major stories. By this time, On Dit had developed a very good reputation both within the state and nationally. On Dit was considered an alternative vehicle to attending media schools for budding reporters. One problem many editors struggled with was encouraging submissions and news from University of Adelaide campuses other than the North Terrace site.

In the 1968 March orientation issue, On Dit published an issue largely dedicated to supporting a student demonstration against the gerrymander that benefited the Coalition government, then headed by South Australian politician Thomas Playford. That same year saw On Dit publish editorials on the use of torture in Vietnam, and on Australia's treatment of Aboriginals, in keeping with the activism of much of the student press at the time. The paper was involved in a vote-rigging scandal involving the Young Liberals and its editor, who had won a surprise victory, Nick Xenophon (a future independent politician).

In March 1991, university student Maria O'Brien wrote a controversial piece in On Dit about the misogyny she experienced during her two years at St Mark's College, one of the residential colleges at the University of Adelaide. That same year, a 21-year-old female student at the college was assaulted and murdered by one of the male students.

In 2006, Edition 10 (Sexuality) of On Dit was stolen. It contained an article by 'Pandora' which gave a view on the upcoming Adelaide University Union elections that was largely favourable to some candidates while disdainful towards others (in one instance likening the then Adelaide University Union President to The Lord of the Rings character Gollum, and labelling him a 'neo-fascist'). Several editions survived. The one held by the Barr Smith Library is available to read online. 2006 was the first year in its long history that two women edited the newspaper.

On October 14th, 2024, the YouX Election Tribunal published a decision voiding the results of the election for On Dit Magazine Editor. The team consisting of candidates Adrian Niculescu, Jennifer Tran, Harish Thilagan, and Raktim Argha were declared not elected due to multiple infractions of campaign rules, primarily the distribution of unauthorised campaign materials, and support from unauthorised campaigners. This followed disqualifications of various ‘Progress’ candidates (a student political faction of which Niculescu, Tran, Thilagan, and Argha were members of) in the general elections for the YouX Board and SRC. The Election Tribunal ordered a re-election for the position/s of On Dit Magazine Editor.

== Format ==
For many years the paper was printed in a tabloid format on standard newsprint. This was changed to a magazine (half-tabloid newsprint) format early in 2006 to help the paper cope with financial uncertainty brought about by Voluntary Student Unionism (VSU). The other change caused by VSU was the paper going from a weekly to fortnightly publication, making Honi Soit the only weekly student publication in Australia.

Some issues of On Dit conform to a certain theme, reflected in the graphical style, and occasionally in the articles within it. One such yearly edition is entitled Elle Dit, written primarily or exclusively by women once a year. In more recent years the paper has better resembled other free street press, though with more artistic (or at any rate abstract) covers, usually eschewing headlines, and a focus more broadly on commentary, politics and pop culture than on the popular music common to the format.

On Dit is usually distributed outside the university in similar locations to other street press publications.

== Editorial staff ==
Prior to 2007, in a typical year there were two or three paid editors, elected by the student body the previous year, who planned the paper. The paid editors were assisted by unpaid sub-editors, columnists and other contributors who researched and wrote individual sections. On Dit is unusual among student papers in that for much of its existence it has remained independent of the prevailing political parties on campus. In 2007, the Student Union voted to remove salaries from the editors (by way of comparison, the 3 editors in 1997 split an annual A$30,000 between them). Because of Voluntary Student Unionism, the editors now have to secure some of their funding from advertising space, and the paper has gone from a weekly broadsheet to a smaller fortnightly magazine.

=== Prominent past editors ===
Prominent past editors include former South Australia State Premier the Hon. Dr John Bannon AO; Hon. Mr Justice Samuel J. Jacobs AO QC; Elliot Frank Johnston QC; author Garry Disher; former ALP state politician Peter Duncan (Australian politician); Rhodes Scholar, Diplomat & Ambassador Charles Robin Ashwin; former South Australian MLC and current Federal Senator Nick Xenophon; former vice-captain of the Australia women's national football (soccer) team Moya Dodd; former Secretary of the South Australian Trade Unions, Chris White; poet Max Harris AO; long-time Advertiser journalist Samela Harris and David Penberthy, editor of The Punch website, and former Advertiser journalist and former editor of The Daily Telegraph in Sydney.

Many On Dit editors over the years have gone on to work for the local daily newspaper, the Advertiser. These have included Samantha Maiden, Colin G. Kerr, Mark Davis, Daniel Wills, Richard Ogier, David Mussared, Rosemary O'Grady, the Rev. Father Will Baynes and David Walker. Editor Noel Lindblom went on to work at the other local daily paper The News while Clementine Ford became a columnist for the Sunday Mail and then later for Fairfax. Other On Dit editors to go on and work in the media have included Nonee Walsh and Roy Leaney at the Australian Broadcasting Corporation, Gemma Clark at radio station Nova 91.9 FM, Myriam Robin at the Australian Financial Review, and Rosemary O'Grady and Michael Jacobs at The Adelaide Review.

A number of editors have found success in the education sector as educationists and academics. These have included educator and feminist Helen Crisp (née Wighton); historian Hon. Dr John Bannon AO; educationist Neile Osman; Rhodes Scholar Herbert W. Piper; Rhodes Scholar Professor John Finnis; Jeff Scott; Dr Andrew Gleeson; Rhodes Scholar Professor Leslie Finlay Crisp; Adjunct Professor Richard Broinowski; Professor Pat Thomson PSM (at the time known as Lewicki); Paul Washington; Rhodes Scholar Professor Julian Disney AO, Clinical Associate Professor Jonathan Gillis; Dr Daniele Viliunas; Professor Peter Otto; and Research Fellow Dr Jacqui Dibden.

=== Prominent contributors ===
Prominent people who have contributed to or written for On Dit include Prime Minister Julia Gillard, South Australian Greens Senator Sarah Hanson-Young; South Australian Labor Party Senator and Minister Penny Wong; Australian author and historian Geoffrey Dutton; comedians Francis Greenslade and Shaun Micallef; novelists Colin Thiele and Sean Williams; South Australian Democrat Senator Natasha Stott Despoja; former ALP Federal Minister Gordon Bilney; playwright Joe Penhall; The Australian Financial Review film critic Peter Crayford; writers Clementine Ford and Russell Marks; and former Federal Liberal Minister Christopher Pyne. Australian Labor Party Senator Anne McEwen contributed to On Dit in the area of administration when she worked for the Students' Association of the University of Adelaide.

Many former On Dit editors, contributors and staff have also gone on to work for the Fairfax Media group. These have included John Sandeman, Moya Dodd, Gilbert Wahlquist, Tim Dodd, David Walker, Annabel Crabb, John Slee, Peter White, John Tanner, Myriam Robin and Elizabeth Flux.

Other On Dit contributors and staff to go on and work in the media have included News Corp’s Samantha Maiden, Keith Conlon from Radio Station 5AA and journalists Jane Willcox, Barry Hailstone, Farah Farouque, Mike Duffy, Jenny Turner and cartoonist Ross Bateup. Former women's columnist Arna Eyers-White and freight manager Alex Wheaton went on to manage and edit Adelaide's fortnightly street press paper dB Magazine. Former On Dit science editor Mark Douglas went on to work with The Advertiser, The Australian, The South China Morning Post and The Times, as well as Channel 7 Australia. He was subsequently also editor of Lumen, the University's major external publication.

== On Dit today ==
On Dit's publication is supported by the Adelaide University Union, with additional costs being covered by advertising. The paper is issued every fortnight during the semester. Ten issues are published each year, with one of these, Elle Dit (translated as "she says"), being an exclusive women's edition. On Dit prints some 2,000 copies of each issue and 2,500 of the O'Week issue.

The elected editors for 2023, taking office in December 2022 are Sienna Sulicich, Louise Jackson, Sebastian Andrew, and Kathers Anderson.
