= James Macartney =

James Macartney may refer to:

- James MacCartney (physician), Scottish apothecary active in 1590s Edinburgh
- James Macartney (anatomist) (1770–1843), Irish anatomist
- James Macartney (died 1727), Irish judge and MP for Belfast 1692–1703
- James Macartney (1692–1770), Irish MP for Longford Borough 1713–27 and Granard 1727–60
- Jim Macartney (1911–1977), Australian newspaper editor

== See also ==
- James McCartney (disambiguation)
