= Freshers' flu =

Illnesses contracted by first-year students

Freshers' flu is a name commonly given to a battery of illnesses contracted by new students (freshers) during the first few weeks at a university, and colleges of further education in some form; common symptoms include fever, sore throat, severe headache, coughing and general discomfort. The illnesses may or may not include actual flu and are often simply a bad cold.

== Causes ==
The most likely cause is the convergence of large numbers of people arriving from all over the world. The poor diet and heavy consumption of alcohol during freshers' week is also reported as a cause for many of the illnesses contracted during this time. "Stress, which may be induced by tiredness, combined with a poor diet, late nights and too much alcohol, can weaken the immune system and be a recipe for ill health. All this can make students and staff working with the students more susceptible to infections within their first weeks of term." In addition to this, nearly all university academic years in the UK commence around the end of September or beginning of October, which "marks the start of the annual flu season". The increased susceptibility to illness from late nights, heavy alcohol consumption and stress peaks 2–4 weeks after arrival at university and happens to coincide with the seasonal surge in the outbreaks of colds and flu in the Northern Hemisphere.

== Other effects ==
As well as the usual viral effects, freshers' flu can also have some psychological effects. These effects arise where the stress of leaving home and other consequences of being independent, not to mention various levels of homesickness and the attempts at making new friends, can further weaken the immune system, increasing susceptibility to illness.

== See also ==
- Freshman 15
