= Eric William Gillett =

Australian lawyer and university officer

Eric William Gillett (1899 – 18 October 1987) was an Australian lawyer and university officer. He served as mayor of the Municipality of Claremont from 1940 until 1953, and Chancellor of the University of Western Australia from 1948 until 1956.

== Biography ==
Gillett was born in 1899 in the town of York to Frederick Charles Gillett and Ada Mary (née Hussey). He was educated at state schools in Pingelly and Claremont, before completing his education at Scotch College. He completed a Bachelor of Arts at the University of Western Australia, and in 1921 was president of the student guild. Graduating in 1922 with first-class honours in English and Latin, he completed a Bachelor of Laws at the University of London and was admitted to the bar in Western Australia in 1924. He then worked as a solicitor in Perth, becoming a partner in the law firm Darbyshire and Gillett. During World War II, he served with the Australian Army Legal Corps.

=== Municipal politics ===
In 1935, he was elected to the Municipality of Claremont for the South ward. He was elected mayor of the municipality on 23 November 1940, in which capacity he served until 1953.

=== University administration ===
In 1931, he was elected to the University's Senate by convocation. In 1943, he became Pro-Chancellor, and on 15 March 1948, upon the retirement of Professor Sir Walter Murdoch. He was the first graduate of the University to serve in either role. He held the role of chancellor until 1956.

He retired as Chancellor in 1956, succeeded by Sir Alexander Reid, but continued as a member of the Senate until 1966.

He died at Bethesda Hospital, Claremont, on 18 October 1987, and was buried in the Anglican section of Karrakatta Cemetery.

Academic offices
Preceded by Sir Walter Murdoch	Chancellor of the University of Western Australia; 1948 – 1956	Succeeded by Sir Alexander Reid
