= Pike Curtin =

Personal information
- Full name: Pearce William Edward Curtin
- Born: 27 September 1907; Boulder, Western Australia
- Died: 17 May 1997 (aged 89); Canberra, Australia
- Nickname: Pike
- Batting: Right-handed
- Bowling: Right-arm medium

Domestic team information
- Years: Team
- 1931/32: Western Australia
- Source: CricketArchive, 2 December 2012

Pearce William Edward "Pike" Curtin (27 September 1907 – 17 May 1997) was an Australian public servant and economist who played a key role in the establishment of a banking system in Papua New Guinea. He was a talented sportsman in his youth, playing first-class cricket for Western Australia.

== Early life and sporting career ==
Born in Boulder, Western Australia, Curtin attended the University of Western Australia, where he captained the university's team in the WACA grade cricket competition, as well as in inter-university matches. During the 1931–32 and 1932–33 seasons, he played three first-class matches for Western Australia against touring international teams. In the first two of these matches, against South Africa at the beginning and end of their 1931–32 tour of Australia, Curtin played as a top order batsman, and scored 35 runs in his debut innings. In his third and final first-class match, against the Marylebone Cricket Club on their 1932–33 tour, he was promoted to open the batting, and was bowled by Harold Larwood for a six-ball duck in Western Australia's only innings.

== Professional career ==
Curtin completed Master of Arts and Bachelor of Laws degrees in Western Australia, and was president of the UWA Student Guild in 1937. He went on to obtain a Doctorate of Philosophy from the London School of Economics. From 1942 to 1946, Curtin was an assistant director at the newly established Department of Post-War Reconstruction, and he later served as director of the Colombo Plan bureau in Sri Lanka and as chairman of the Commonwealth Public Service Board. Working in the research department of the Commonwealth Bank, he was appointed to the position of senior research economist (international affairs) in November 1958, having served under H. C. "Nugget" Coombs, the bank's governor, during the war. Curtin went on to play a key role in the Reserve Bank's establishment of a banking system in Papua New Guinea. Described as an "unorthodox economist of Fabian persuasion", he died in Canberra in May 1997.
