= Tory Shepherd =

Australian journalist

Tory Shepherd is an Australian opinion writer and journalist based in Adelaide, South Australia. as of September 2024 a senior reporter for Guardian Australia. She has worked for News Corp Australia publications in the past.

== Early life and education ==
Tory Shepherd grew up in Adelaide. She did an arts degree after school, and then spent a year backpacking around Australia. Returning to Adelaide, she did an honours degree in anthropology, writing her thesis on UFO cults.

After backpacking around Europe for two years, she returned to her home town and managed a national visual arts magazine. In 2004 she wrote an article for Artlink in 2004.

She then gained a Master of Arts degree in Professional Communication.

== Career ==
Shepherd joined News Limited in 2006, starting with a cadetship at The Advertiser and spending 15 years there and other News Corp publications as a full-time journalist. She became federal political editor, living in both Canberra and Adelaide, and was later space and defence reporter for The Advertiser. She spent a number of years as health reporter at The Advertiser (around 2009), and in 2015 was a columnist at the paper.

She has written for various News Limited media publications and websites, including being a columnist and sometime editor at The Punch.

As of September 2024 she is a senior reporter for Guardian Australia.

== Media and public appearances ==
Shepherd has appeared as panellist on the ABC TV discussion program Insiders, as well as ABC Radio and other television shows, including The Drum on ABC and Sunrise on the Seven Network.

She appeared in episode 6 of The Chaser's Media Circus in 2014. Shepherd has been a panellist at a number of events in the Behind the Headlines series of public forums, hosted by Paul Willis at the Royal Institution of Australia,

== Other activities ==
Shepherd was a member of the Mindframe media advisory group.

In 2021–22 she co-hosted the true crime podcast Mapping Evil with crime investigator Mike King.

== Publications ==
In 2020 Shepherd published a book, On Freedom, which "looks at how women's freedom to choose motherhood is reshaping their own lives as well as society".

== Recognition ==
Shepherd has been awarded Churchill Fellowship, and has been on the judging panel for the Walkley Awards.

In 2010, she won Best Columnist, Blogger, Commentator, in the SA Press Club awards.
