= James McCartney (disambiguation) =

James McCartney may refer to:

- James Paul McCartney (born 1942), English singer and former Beatle
- James Louis McCartney (born 1977), English singer and son of James Paul McCartney
- James R. McCartney (1920–2011), American politician
- James Alexander George Smith McCartney (1945–1980), politician from the Turks and Caicos Islands
- James A. McCartney (1835–1911), American lawyer and politician
- James Paul McCartney (TV programme), a 1973 television special

== See also ==
- James Macartney (disambiguation)
