= Vincent Smith (television presenter) =

Australian journalist (1943–1991)

- Born: 21 March 1943; Perth, Western Australia
- Died: 20 April 1991 (aged 48)
- Occupations: Television journalist, news director, author and presenter
- Employer(s): Seven Network, The West Australian, The Australian, the National Times, 2UE, 2GB, 5DN, 5AA

Vincent Smith (21 March 1943 – 20 April 1991) was an Australian journalist and broadcaster.

== Early life ==
Vincent Ross Smith was born in Perth, Western Australia on 21 March 1943. Smith was born in the Tresillian Hospital, Nedlands, to parents Ross and Ina.

Both his father Ross Smith (Charles David) and grandfather Charles Patrick Smith were involved in the newspaper business in Perth, with Charles Patrick Smith the managing editor of West Australian Newspapers Ltd.

Vincent grew up in the Perth suburb of Claremont, where his grandfather also had a home. Smith's father, Charles David Ross, is listed on the 1963 Electoral Roll as a journalist living in Claremont.

While working in Canberra, Smith met Susan Marks. They married on 22 July 1968 in Mount Kisco, Westchester, New York.

== Later life ==
=== Newspaper journalist ===
Smith began his journalistic career with the West Australian in the 1960s, before switching to The Australian followed by The National Times.

=== Radio announcer ===
In the early 1970s, Smith became an announcer for an afternoon radio show on 2UE in Sydney – a current affairs program, working with his close friend Mike Carlton.

Smith later became the news director at 2UE in the late 1970s.

=== Seven Network ===
Smith became news director at ATN Seven in Sydney in 1981, with the Australian Women's Weekly reporting:

"For news director Vincent Smith, the newsroom revamp is a major step and will bring about a dramatic change of image. 'We want to develop a concept of authoritative, mature news,' Smith said, "I've tried to recruit a team of mature on-air journalists. TV news today seems orientated toward youth which can give a naive image. Our new look will be unlike anything seen before on Australian television. We'll reinforce a business-like authority so viewers can look toward us as an authoritative news coverage.'"

ATN-7 reportedly spent $500,000 in the revamp of its newsroom. The revamp included the following changes:

- Departure of veteran news presenter Roger Climpson as dual newsreader;
- Ross Symonds took over as chief news presenter;
- Ten new journalists, including Kerry O'Brien (formerly 4-Corners on ABC-TV), Jim Cannon (Perth), Michelle Schofield (ABC) and Kay Stammers (TEN-10).

In December 1981, speculation was rife surrounding the future of George Negus on Nine's 60 Minutes, with the Sydney Morning Herald reporting Smith and Negus had been seen having lunch at media hangout Eric's Seafoods Fish Cafe in Crows Nest, significant (the article implied) because Smith was news director ATN-7

The meeting with Negus was also seen in the context of Smith's revamp of Seven's newsroom the previous month. He is reported to have said "There was just one lunch – and we're just good friends", and in the same article Jacqueline Lee Lewes writes that "Smith, who, it must be said, is rather enjoying all the fuss that this one matey meeting has caused".

Smith hosted the Seven network news program 11AM for several years during the 1980s.

=== Return to radio ===
Smith left Seven in 1986 and returned to radio, becoming the producer for the John Laws show at 2GB in Sydney.

Moving to Adelaide in the late 1980s, he hosted radio talk-back programs on 5DN and 5AA, hosting his morning talk-back show at the latter right up to the last month of his life.

=== MBE Award ===
In 1980, Smith was awarded a MBE for services to journalism and conservation.

=== As an author ===
Harper and Row published Smith's book, a novel titled Musco, Blue Whale, in 1978.

Reviewer L.V. Kepert wrote in The Sydney Morning Herald: "Now that the future of whales and the morality of whaling have become major issues, Australian author Vincent Smith has produced in Musco, Blue Whale ... a book that is both a story and a tract. This is the whales' side of the case for survival ..."

Kepert described one of Smith's descriptive and more anthropomorphic paragraphs as "gush like a breathless romance": "She reflected on the set of his head, the way it thrust powerfully forward and down from his blowholes to the fine line of his tightly closed jaw ... Nika noted in Musco that the smug expression was tempered somehow by an overall look of good humour ... She liked this whale."

Kepert told readers Smith had "... done his research. The whales' migratory habits, their diet, their physiology, their family and group patterns, are doubtless as the scientist sees them."

== Health decline ==
=== Diagnosis of cancer ===
Diagnosed with cancer, Smith appeared on 60 Minutes on the Nine Network in Australia, discussing the disease.

In the last year of his life he spoke publicly about his battle with the disease on his radio show and in newspapers. He continued with a weekly newspaper column; his last was published 12 days before his death.

=== Death ===
Smith died of cancer in Adelaide on 20 April 1991, at the age of 48.

== Tributes ==
On 21 April 1991 the Canberra Times published an article headlined "'The thinking man's broadcaster dies at 48".

The South Australian premier at the time, John Bannon, repeated the compliment, going on to say "He dealt with serious events and put all points of view" and "He knew which issues touched people. He could boil complex arguments down so ordinary people could understand them, both on the air and in print.".
