= University of Western Australia Student Guild =

UWA Student Guild
- 112th Guild Council

Type
- Type: Council

History
- Founded: 1913; 113 years ago
- New session started: 1 December 2024

Leadership
- President: Nikhita Talluri, Spark since 1 December 2024
- Vice-President: Oliver Barrett, Spark since 1 December 2024
- General Secretary: Annika Leunig, Spark since 1 December 2024
- Chair of Guild Council: Aidan Kirby-Smith, Spark since 1 December 2024

Structure
- Seats: 21
- Political groups: Socialist Alternative; REVIVE; SPARK; GLOBAL
- Length of term: 1 year

Elections
- Next election: Begins 16 September 2025

Website
- UWA Student Guild

Constitution
- Constitution approved on 4 March 2021

Rules
- Standing Orders approved in 2023

The UWA Student Guild is the official student representative body at the University of Western Australia, representing the interests of students to the university, government and the wider community, as well as providing services to students. As of 2021, the Guild is affiliated with the National Union of Students, the peak representative body for Australian tertiary students. In 2021, 96% of the 21,265 UWA students were members of the Guild.

Guild Council is the overall governing body of the Guild and consists of voting and non-voting members democratically elected at the annual Guild elections or at department annual general meetings.

== Governance ==
=== Annual Elections ===
Student representatives are elected to their positions by students in annual elections held in September. Elections are conducted by the Western Australian Electoral Commission. Elected office bearers take office as of 1 December in the year they are elected.

=== Guild Executive ===
The Guild Executive consists of the Guild President, the Guild Vice-president, the Guild General Secretary, and the Chair of Guild Council. Both the Guild Vice-president and the Chair of Guild Council are elected by and from Guild Council at the first meeting for the Guild Year.

=== Guild Council ===
The Guild is administered by a council of student representatives elected for one-year terms, beginning on December 1 and ending on the 30th of November in the following year. There are twenty-one voting members of council, and several more non-voting members. Members may hold a voting and a non-voting role concurrently. Unlike some other student unions, there is no financial compensation for student representatives, with the exception of the President and Postgraduate Representative who work at the Guild full-time and part-time respectively during their term.

Members of Guild Council are:

- Guild President: the peak student representative at UWA. The 2025 Guild President is Nikhita (Nikhi) Talluri.
- Vice President: is responsible for assisting the President as a member of the Guild Executive. The 2025 Vice President is Oliver Barrett.
- Chair of Guild Council (or Chair): is responsible for chairing all meetings of Guild Council as well as presiding over statutes and by-laws of the Guild. The 2025 Chair is Aidan Kirby-Smith.
- General Secretary (GenSec): sits on several committees, publishes the agendas and minutes for Guild Council, and assists with organising the budget for the Guild. The 2025 General Secretary is Annika Leunig.
- President of Education Council: chairs Education Council (Ed. Council) which provides a forum for students to have a voice on educational issues. The 2025 Education Council President is Jay Williams.
- President of Public Affairs Council (PAC): is responsible for overseeing the activities of PAC as well as reporting to Guild Council. The 2025 PAC President is Aimee Chan.
- President of Societies Council (SOC): is responsible for overseeing the activities of SOC as well as reporting to Guild Council. The 2025 SOC President is Ethan Tan.
- President of the Postgraduate Students' Association (PSA): oversees the PSA which is the representative body for postgraduate students at UWA. The 2025 PSA President is Charlotte (Charlie) Backshall.
- President of the International Students' Department (ISD): is responsible for overseeing ISD which represents international students studying at UWA. The 2025 ISD President is Archit Menon.
- The 2025 Western Australian Students' Aboriginal Corporation (WASAC) Chair: is Ashleigh Petkovic.
- Women's Officer: is responsible for overseeing the Women's Department which represents women and non-binary students on campus. The 2025 Women's Officer is Ruby Membry.
- 13 Ordinary Guild Councillors (OGC). The 2024 OGCs are:
  - Oliver Barrett.
  - Ritika Menon.
  - Kassidy Anderson.
  - Jude Kamalddin.
  - Katrina Soares.
  - Naveen Nimalan.
  - Lachy Flavel.
  - Ojaswi Shrestha.
  - Finn Penter.
  - Aidan Kirby-Smith.
  - Olivia Stronach.
  - Archana Ashok.
  - Rama Sugiartha.

Standing Invitees are not members of Guild Council but have the same rights and privileges. Standing invitees are:

- Immediate past Guild President.
- Wellbeing Officer: is responsible for overseeing the activities of the Wellbeing Department which co-ordinates and organises the wellbeing activities. The 2025 Wellbeing Officer is Jeffrey Tang.
- Environment Officer: is responsible for overseeing the Environment Department which seeks to promote sustainability for the Guild and University. The 2025 Environment Officer is Julia Suffell.
- Sports Officer: is responsible for overseeing the activities of the Sports Department which seeks to promote active lifestyles for UWA students. The 2025 Sports Officer is Damian Zhang.
- Residential Students' Department (RSD) President: oversees the activities of RSD which is the peak representative body for students living on-campus. The 2025 RSD President is Elizabeth (Libby) Bailey, Bailey was appointed following the resignation of Anthony Sims.
- Pride Officer: is responsible for overseeing the Pride Department. The 2025 Pride Co-Officers are Aryaman Bhoosreddy and Ashel Siby.
- Access Officer: is responsible for overseeing the Access Department. The 2024 Access Co-Officers are Tabarek Alhaffar and Lucinda Bartlett.
- Ethnocultural Officer: is responsible for overseeing the Ethnocultural Department which serves as a representative voice for culturally and linguistically diverse (CaLD) students to Guild Council. The 2025 Ethnocultural Co-Officers are Selina Al Ansari and Reihaneh Gholilou.
- Volunteering Chair.
- Mature Age Students' Association (MASA) Chair.
- Any other Department officers.

== Services provided ==
The Guild runs a number of activities including Orientation Day (O-Day), the Weekly Tav Quiz and welfare events. Guild Departments and Subsidiary Councils run other events, such as Club Carnival run by the Societies Council.

The Guild supports and assists a network of more than 140 affiliated clubs and societies on campus through the Societies Council, catering to a very wide range of interests (religious, theatrical, cultural etc.). The Guild runs the majority of catering outlets on campus, including the Tavern, and a volunteering centre.

The Guild's Student Assist provides one-on-one academic advocacy, financial counselling, a food pantry, and interest-free loans.

== Student media ==
The Publications Committee oversees print publications from student departments. This includes publications such as Pelican, Damsel Magazine (Women's Department), and Lighthouse Magazine (International Students' Department).

Pelican was established in 1930, making it one of the oldest student publications in Australia.

PROSH is a Guild initiative that began in 1931 and is the oldest and most successful single-day charity event in the country run entirely by students. The tradition sees UWA students dress up in costumes and sell the satirical newspaper to raise money for charity.

== History ==
=== Foundation ===
The first meeting of Guild Council was held on Friday the 11th of April in 1913 with Sir John Winthrop Hackett serving as the first Guild President. Due to tuition being free at UWA at the time, there were limited resources for social and sporting activities, this resulted in the Guild taking these activities on and charging a membership fee of a half-crown, two shillings and a sixpence.

=== Cruickshank-Routley Memorial Prize ===
In 1955, following the deaths of two final year law students - Ian Cruickshank and George Routley - the Cruickshank-Routley Memorial Prize was established by the Guild. In July 1983, an inaugural Cruickshank-Routley Memorial Prize Dinner was held which has now become the annual Guild Ball, held in October. The Cruickshank-Routley Memorial Prize is awarded to the student who has made the greatest contribution to student life at UWA. In 2023, the prize was $500.

=== 'New' Guild Building ===
In 2021, the UWA Student Guild held a Guild Alumni event to celebrate fifty years since the opening of the New Guild Building. The event was attended by former Guild President, Kim Beazley as well as former Guild Councillor the Hon. Robert French AC.

== Controversies ==
=== Racism controversy ===
The 2013 edition of annual charity newspaper Prosh caused significant controversy when a racist article, "dream-time horoscopes" lead to a public relations disaster for the Guild, with the Indigenous Communities Education & Awareness Foundation (ICEA) withdrawing support from the paper. SBS News reported that the horoscopes read "don't get stuck in a rut, shake up your daily routine and grab yourself a block of V-B instead of export". The Guild President at the time, Cameron Barnes, apologised for the article and committing to conducting an independent review of the newspaper's editorial processes.

=== Missing money ===
In May 2014, the Guild hired audit and tax firm BDO to investigate financial irregularities in the Guild's 2013 accounts which identified between $800,000 and $900,000 in financial irregularities. Following the investigation, a staff member was dismissed as confirmed by the then Guild President, Tom Henderson. In 2018, a former financial officer of the Guild confessed to stealing more than $500,000 from the organisation. The financial officer was ordered to pay back $560,000 to the Guild's insurer as well as sentenced to four years in jail.

== Past Guild Presidents ==
Year	Name	Ref.
1913	Sir John Winthrop Hackett	
1914	Mr JJ Fitzgerald	
1915	Mr JG Robertson	
1916	Mr HS Thompson	
1917	Mr J Shearer	
1918	Mr HT Stables	
1919	Mr AF Backhouse	
1920	Mr E Grace	
1921	Mr EW Gillett	
1922	Mr HPD Lyon	
1923	Mr F Maw	
1923+	Mr TA Hartrey	
1924	Mr SG Demasson	
1925	Mr W Southern	
1926	Mr GL Throssell	
1927	Mr KL Cooper	
1928	Mr RG Wright	
1929	Mr AM Stewart	
1930	Mr RV Nevile	
1931	Mr HC Coombs	
1932	Mr C Sanders	
1933	Mr TG Wilsmore	
1934	Mr TH Roberts	
1935	Mr PWE Curtin	
1936	Mr GP Paterson	
1937	Mr NG Traylen	
1938	Mr H Giese	
1939	Mr S Johnson	
1940	Mr AJ Williams	
1941	Mr GB Hill	
1942	Mr FM Bennett	
1943	Mr JM Thomson	
1944	Mr AL Arcus	
1945	Mr FH Hibberd	
1946	Mr GE Ross	
1947	Mr DD Dunn	
1948	Mr PD Durack	
1949	Mr SB Rosier	
1950	Mr DE Hutchison	
1951	Mr JO Stone	
1952	Mr RJ Hawke	
1953	Mr BH Lochtenberg	
1953+	Mr LG Wilson	
1954	Mr JH McConnell	
1955	Mr JFM Gillett	
1956	Mr EN Maslen	
1957	Mr JK Walsh	
1958	Mr KB Paterson	
1959	Mr RD Nicholson	
1960	Mr EM Palandri	
1961	Mr GG Harvey	
1962	Mr RSW Lugg	
1963	Mr AH Fels	
1964	Mr DR Williams	
1965	Mr SG Errington	
1966	Mr RB Alexander	
1967	Mr PG Edwards	
1968	Mr D MacKinlay	
1969	Ms SJD Boyd	
1970	Mr KC Beazley	
1971	Mr RJ Perry	
1972	Mr JA McGinty	
1973	Mr RB Porter	
1974	Mr PM Alexander	
1975	Mr DC Parker	
1976	Mr NG Roberts	
1977	Mr AD Fitzgerald	
1978	Mr WR Grace	
1979	Mr KW Strahan	
1980	Mr DN Anderson	
1981	Mr ERJ Dermer	
1982	Mr MW Rennie	
1983	Mr MJ Huston	
1984	Miss DE Willmont	
1985	Mr DJ Kelly	
1986	Mr MT Schaper	
1987	Miss JA Quinlivan	
1988	Mr AC Tomlinson	
1989	Mr MZ Sumich	
1990	Mr TL Smith	
1991	Bruce Baskerville	
1992	Justin Kennedy	
1993	Luke Forsyth	
1994	Sarah Haynes	
1995	Natalie Curling	
1996	Simon Freitag	
1997	James Fogarty	
1998	Rosie Dawkins	
1999	Emmanuel Hondros	
2000	Tim Huggins	
2001	Kristy Duckham	
2002	Ryan Batchelor	
2003	Myra Robinson	
2004	Susie Byers	
2005	Natalie Hepburn	
2006	Mathew Chuk	
2007	Dave de Hoog	
2008	Nik Barron	
2009	Dominic Rose	
2010	Emma Greeney	
2011	Tom Antoniazzi	
2012	Matthew Mckenzie	
2013	Cameron Barnes	
2014	Thomas Henderson	
2015	Lizzy O’Shea	
2016	Maddie Mulholland	
2017	Nevin Jayawardena	
2018	Megan Lee	
2019	Conrad Hogg	
2020	Bre Shanahan	
2021	Emma Mezger	
2022	Amitabh Jeganathan	
2023	Geemal Jayawickrama	
2024	Indi Creed	
2025	Nikhita Talluri	
2026	Oliver Barrett	
