= David Penberthy =

Australian journalist (born 1969)

David Penberthy (born 1969, Adelaide, South Australia) is the former editor-in-chief of News Limited news site news.com.au and the former opinion website, The Punch. He was editor of The Daily Telegraph in Sydney, Australia, from April 2005 until November 2008.

== Early life and education ==
Penberthy studied a Bachelor of Arts at the University of Adelaide in the late 1980s. Initially, he had enrolled in a Bachelor of Arts and Bachelor of Laws, but he left legal studies to enter journalism.

== Career ==
He was the 1990 co-editor of On Dit, the newspaper of the University's Student Association and was also President of CISCAC, the Committee in Solidarity with Central America and the Caribbean, a Marxist political club. In addition he was the energetic frontman for punk band Cerveza y Putas (Beer and Whores), which played originals and cover songs from such bands as the Pixies, Minor Threat, The Lemonheads, The Smiths and Hüsker Dü in Spanish, a language Penberthy acquired while living in Mexico in the late 1980s.

Penberthy started his career as an industrial relations reporter and then political reporter for the Adelaide-based The Advertiser, hired by then editor Peter Blunden.

In 1999 Penberthy switched to work at the Sydney-based Daily Telegraph, another newspaper in the News Limited stable. Three years into his tenure at the Telegraph he was appointed chief of staff. Later he became an opinion editor and roving columnist for the newspaper. One of Penberthy's more famous moments as a reporter with the Daily Telegraph came with his "Five Star Asylum" piece, an article headlined "The truth about how inmates are treated inside Australia's detention centres."

In 2005 Penberthy was appointed editor of the Daily Telegraph. As editor, Penberthy came under intense pressure over the publication of stories focusing on then NSW Liberal Party leader John Brogden, who was accused of making inappropriate comments to the journalist Justine Ferrari while drunk. The Daily Telegraph said there was evidence of more serious issues concerning Brogden, who later apparently tried to commit suicide.

Penberthy resigned as editor of the Daily Telegraph in November 2008 during the newspaper's campaign for the New South Wales state government to "sack itself".

In October 2010, Penberthy was appointed the editor-in-chief of News Limited's online news site news.com.au as well as opinion website The Punch.

In 2017 Penberthy was the co-host of the Breakfast Show (6am–9am) on Adelaide talkback radio station FIVEaa alongside Will Goodings. He is also a columnist for The Australian, The Advertiser, and the Sunday Mail.

In 2025, Penberthy embellished a story about a trans athlete at a South Australian school event which led to subsequent media attacks against the child and their family. When asked why he had not published a correction to the offending article when it was shown to be false, he reportedly responded "...until now I did not know that she wanted one".

== Personal life ==
In October 2010 it was reported that Penberthy had recently separated from his wife and he was romantically linked to federal MP Kate Ellis. A relationship between the two was confirmed by news reports in January 2011. They confirmed their engagement in November 2012, and were married on 23 February 2013. They had a son in April 2015. Their second son was born in July 2017.
