= Prosh (University of Adelaide) =

Prosh at the University of Adelaide is annual event organised by the student union. Formally established in 1905 as a means for students to play pranks and poke fun at established South Australian institutions during a parade, the event has since 1954 involved the sale of the satirical student-run Prosh newspaper to raise funds for charities. The event winds up with the Prosh After Dark social event at the UniBar dating back to the annual Prosh Ball. A similar event is also held at the University of Western Australia.

== History ==
The inaugural Prosh Parade following its 1905 formalisation

The student union organises the annual Prosh week events inspired by the medieval tradition of ragging or "an extensive display of noisy disorderly conduct, carried on in defiance of authority or discipline". The annual Procesh procession began in 1905 as a means for students to poke fun at established South Australian institutions, though ragging at the university dates back to the late 19th century. In one example, multiple alarm clocks set and hid by students behind books made constant interruptions during a 1896 ceremony at the former Mitchell Building library. The Prosh parade has in modern times included live band performances on flatbed trucks, student club-made floats and booze cruisers transporting inebriated students. Among notable pranks, students suspended a car on Adelaide University Footbridge in 1974 above the River Torrens as part of Operation Bridge-hang.

=== Prosh newspaper ===
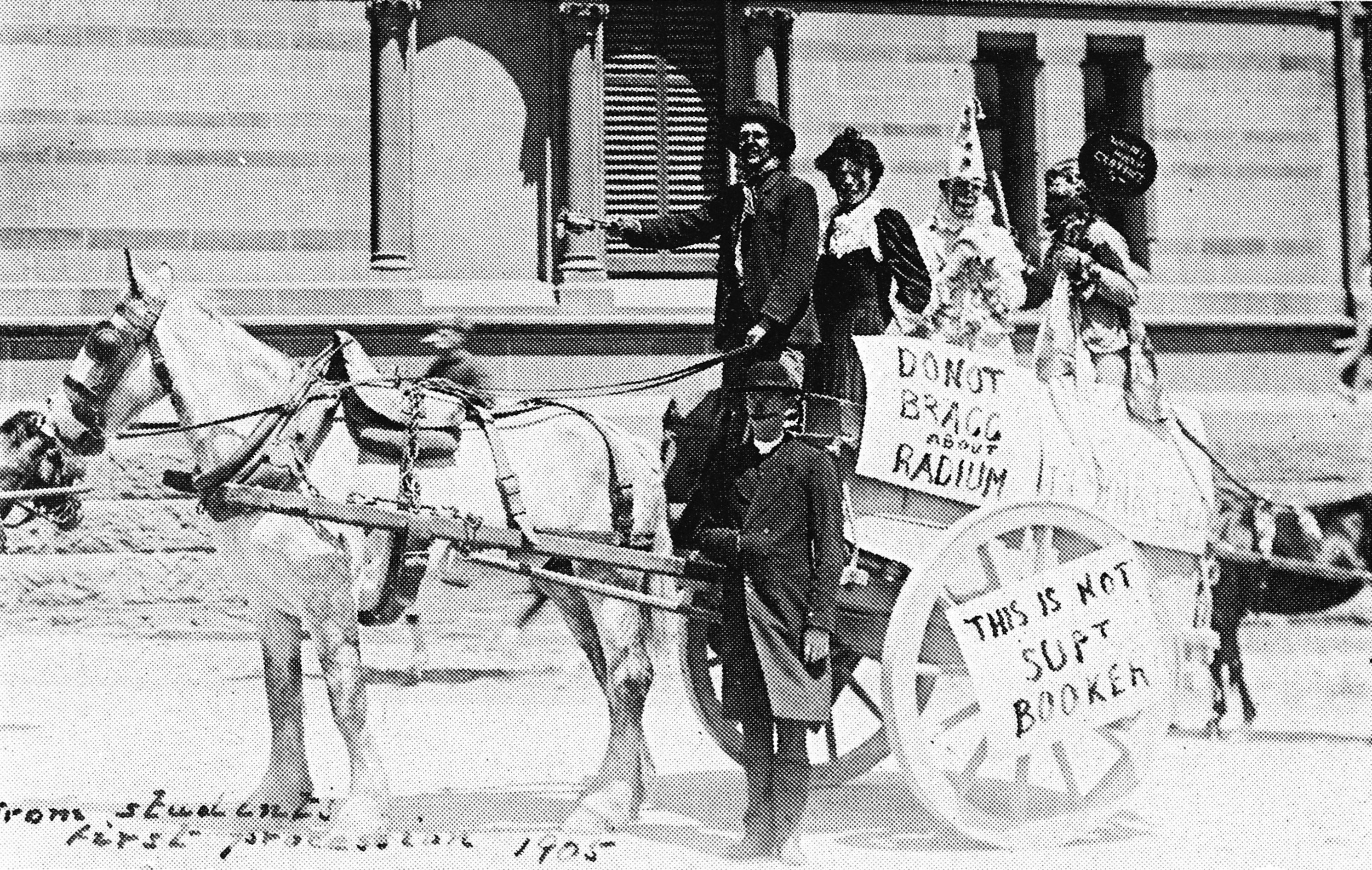
Students on horse cart during the 1905 Prosh Parade with a poster that reads "DO NOT BRAGG ABOUT RADIUM"

Since 1954, the event has also involved the sale of satirical newspapers in public settings. The Prosh Rag, later an annual issue of the On Dit student magazine, contains humorous references to various well-known persons of the day. It has been sold on city streets by students to raise funds for charity as an attempt to legitimise the event following attempts to ban it in the early 1950s. Since at least the 1960s, the event and magazine has often been involved in controversial topics including Australia's involvement in the Vietnam War, apartheid, nuclear warfare, Aboriginal rights and the general administration of the university. Following the end of free university education, the event has toned down in more recent times as a result of increased work commitments by students and the rise of social media for activism. Prosh week winds up with the Prosh After Dark social event in the UniBar which has its origins from the Prosh Ball.

== Famous participants ==
Over the years many students who were to become well known members of the South Australian community have taken part

- 1948 - Robin Millhouse, the St Marks irregulars.

== Infamous pranks ==
- 1966 - Radio Prosh broadcast from a pirate radio station located aboard a boat in international waters off the coast of South Australia. Broadcast personality Ernie Sigley was kidnapped and brought to the specially converted fishing boat.
- 1974 - Engineering students suspended an FJ Holden from the University Footbridge.

Under cover of the early hours of one Friday morning, a group of volunteers pushed the FJ Holden under the bridge next to the water on the Southern bank of the Torrens. The car was lifted using beams and lifting gear attached to a small hand operated crane located on the footbridge. The crane, with car attached was then pushed out to the centre of the bridge. The car was then firmly secured to the bridge using a large chain. The crane and volunteers then quickly disappeared into the night and were never found.
This prank has become part of university folk lore. When one of the students, Ronald Sainsbury, returned to the University with his daughter 43 years later in 2016 he was besieged by current students who had heard rumours of the prank but not believed it to be true. He ended up spending an hour with them drawing diagrams and explaining the mechanics of it.

- Circa 1990s - Kidnapping of Adelaide identities and their ransom for donations to charitable causes. Hostages were held on the Sail Training Ship the Falie.
- 2005 - Peter Goers, a presenter for ABC Radio, was kidnapped from his office by two students dressed as an elephant and a pig, and held hostage until the ABC donated an undisclosed sum to Oxfam's Save the Children fund.

== See also ==
- Prosh (University of Western Australia)
- Melbourne University Prosh Week
- Rag (student society)
