= Charles Patrick Smith =

Australian journalist

Charles Patrick Smith (3 October 1877 – 5 August 1963) was an Australian journalist and newspaper editor. He had long associations with The Argus (of Melbourne) and The West Australian (of Perth).

== Background ==
Smith was born in Dundas, Ontario, Canada, to Mary Elizabeth (née Rosselle) and Thomas Smith. His family emigrated to Australia when he was a child, settling in Ballarat, Victoria. Smith attended Wesley College, Melbourne, leaving school at the age of 17 to work as a proofreader for a sporting journal. He later began working for The Argus as a compositor, also occasionally writing for The Herald and The Bulletin. Smith joined the reporting staff of The Argus in 1911, and became known for his political reporting. In August 1914, he was with Prime Minister Andrew Fisher when he was notified of the outbreak of war, while he had earlier covered General Hamilton's inspection of the Australian forces.

In December 1914, Smith was attached to the 4th Infantry Brigade as a war correspondent. He covered training in Egypt and then portions of the Gallipoli Campaign, with his reports focusing on the experiences of front-line soldiers. Smith was later posted to the Balkan Theatre. In 1916, he was made chief of the literary staff of The Argus. He was appointed assistant general manager in 1921, and the same year accompanied Prime Minister Billy Hughes to the 1921 Imperial Conference in London. Smith moved to Perth in 1927, becoming managing editor of West Australian Newspapers Ltd. (the parent company of The West Australian) in place of Sir Alfred Langler. He was promoted to managing director in 1931, serving in that position until his retirement in 1951. Smith died in Perth in 1963, aged 85. A grandson, Vincent Smith, was also a journalist.
