= YouX =

Students' union at the University of Adelaide

- Founded: 1895
- Type: Student union
- Location: University of Adelaide, Adelaide, South Australia
- SRC president: Edward Archer (acting)
- YouX board president: Merlin Wang (2024)
- Main organ: YouX SRC
- Subsidiaries: On Dit (student newspaper)
- Affiliations: National Union of Students (Australia)
- Website: youx.org.au

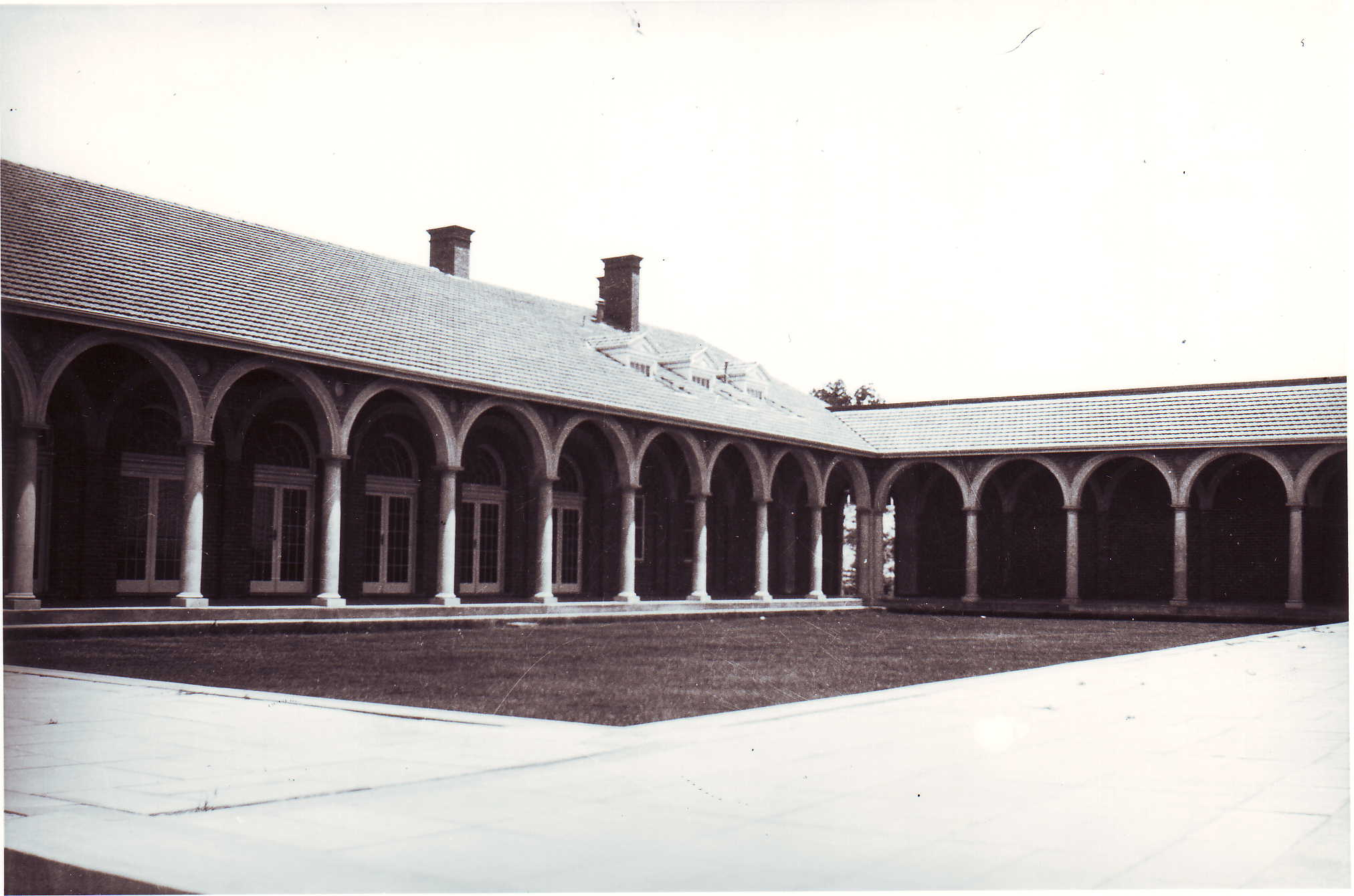
Adelaide University Union Building 1930

YouX, officially the Adelaide University Union (AUU), is a student union at the University of Adelaide in South Australia. It provides academic advocacy, welfare and counselling services to students free of charge, funds the student newspaper On Dit, and owns a number of commercial operations on campus. It also oversees the Student Representative Council (SRC), an organisationally separate body responsible for student political representation.

It was founded in 1895 and since 1971 is recognised as a statutory corporation under the legislation governing the University of Adelaide. As of 2024, there are over 175 clubs and societies under the umbrella of the union.

In September 2024, YouX and the University of South Australia Student Association announced their intention to merge.

== History ==
The Adelaide University Union was founded in 1895 and is one of the oldest students' unions in Australia.

Following the establishment of the student association, three founding sports clubs co-founded the Adelaide University Sports Association in 1896. The sports association was administered by the student union for over 100 years before becoming directly affiliated with the university in 2010. The Adelaide University Sports Association renamed to Adelaide University Sport that same year.

As of 2024, there are over 175 clubs and societies under the umbrella of the union. These include the Adelaide University Sciences Association (the oldest society at the union not related to sports), the Adelaide Medical Students' Society established in 1889 and the former Adelaide University Sports Association.

=== Rebranding (2022) ===
A decision in November 2021 led to the AUU being rebranded as YouX in 2022, which led to protests from many students, who called it thoughtless and rushed, with students being directed to a pornographic adult website with the same name. YouX initially declined to process a student's Freedom of Information request for the costing and communication of the rebranding, who then lodged an application to the South Australian Ombudsman. The state ombudsman directed the University of Adelaide to release documents relating to the rebranding. The documents revealed that 93 per cent of students saw the term AUU as positive or neutral, while 19% saw the term as negative. The rebrand was based on the perception that a decline in student members might be reversed if the word "union" was dropped from the name, although focus groups had found that the preferred name (out of the three options AUU, Adelaide University Union, and YouX), was AUU. The cost of the rebranding was A$80,000, with most of the cost being the development of the new logo, at A$79,972. During the 2022 student union election, candidates were told by YouX not to criticise the rebranding, warning that breaches would result in sanctions.

=== Election Scandal (2024) ===
On 15 October 2024, the YouX Election Tribunal published a decision regarding allegations of misconduct by the incumbent Progress party during the 2024 student representative council election, conducted from the 26th to the 30th of August. The decision followed allegations that members of the Progress party took phones from students and cast votes on their behalf, and that a social event hosted by the Chinese Student's Association required students to hand over their phones to have votes cast before being allowed to participate. In its decision, the Tribunal declared all positions won by Progress candidates void, except those elected unopposed. The tribunal also imposed a two-day campaigning ban on all Progress candidates for the re-election triggered as a result of the voiding. In addition, one candidate from Progress party was banned from standing in any YouX election until 2026, and was referred to the university for further disciplinary action.

Similarly, on the 14th of October, the tribunal also published a decision regarding the media election for the editors of On Dit (conducted the week after the student election) following allegations of misconduct by the Progress party. The decision found that Progress candidates used unauthorised materials while campaigning, and that unauthorised personnel campaigned for the party. The results of the election were voided, a re-election called, and the Progress candidates banned from campaigning for one day.

Unrelated to Progress, one student from the Left Action party was also disqualified from the SRC election and banned from standing in any YouX election until 2026 following allegations that he told another candidate "do me a favour, go home and hang yourself", and that he also physically intimidated a different candidate.

== Formal relationship with the university ==
The Adelaide University Union is a statutory corporation under Section 21 of The University of Adelaide Act (1971), unlike other South Australian universities with their governing legislation. This influenced the inclusion of a similar section in Adelaide University Act (2023) for the merger of Adelaide University with the student unions of both universities fighting for the inclusion, and in addition, the "Western Australian model" of legislated 50% of SSAF to the student union.

Since 2008, the Adelaide University Union/YouX has relied on the University of Adelaide for the majority of its funding. This is a result of a funding agreement with the university.

The ultimate existence of the AUU/YouX, and its relationship with the university, is governed by the University of Adelaide Act 1971. This Act of the South Australian Parliament gives the University of Adelaide Council certain powers over YouX. YouX cannot alter its constitution or rules, or charge a membership fee, without the agreement of University Council, and YouX is bound to provide the council with its financial reports and budget for the coming calendar year prior to 1 December.

== Student governance ==
YouX is governed by a board of management. The board consists of 10 ordinary members, who are not also permanent staff of YouX, five of whom are elected annually on two-year terms by the students of the university. The board then elects several of its members to positions within YouX, such as union president, vice president, student media committee chair and clubs committee chair. Elections are held annually in September, with the board-elect and officer bearers taking their positions on 1 December.

Notable past presidents include former South Australian premier John Bannon, former South Australia attorney-general Chris Sumner, Australia's first female prime minister Julia Gillard (1981–1982), and former South Australian Supreme Court judges Elliott Johnston and Samuel Jacobs.

Oscar Zi Shao Ong was president of YouX between 2021 and 2022, presiding over a board dominated by Young Liberals. During this time they cut funding for the Women's Collective and passed a constitutional amendment which gave an "independent committee" final approval rights over editorial content published in student newspaper On Dit. Ong was also the national president of the Council of International Students Australia (CISA), during which time there were at least five disaffiliations from CISA, citing poor governance and communications as well as Ong's conservative leadership.

The 2023 election results for the 2024 SRC president and many other board positions were declared void amid allegations of misconduct, and Georgia Thomas remained caretaker student president until another election could be held. There had been several allegations that Progress faction members took other students' phones at an Adelaide University Chinese Students' Association event on 26 August 2024 and voted on their behalf without their consent. An independent tribunal of law academics and lawyers ruled that Progress candidates would be banned from campaigning for the first two days of the replacement elections. In separate findings, the tribunal ruled that the winning Progress-aligned On Dit vote had breached election rules.

As of March 2025 Merlin Wang is president.

== Publications ==
On Dit (pronounced on-dee), the second-oldest student-run print media in Australia, was established by the student union in 1932. It is named after the French expression "we say" and operates independently of the university. It also occasionally uses the name "Hearsay" as a creative writing edition of the magazine that dates back to 1972 when the then-newspaper changed its name to "Heresay" in Volume 14 as part of a protest against nuclear testing in the Pacific by France. The Prosh Rag, which contains satirical content, is another special issue that is sold by students to the public to raise funds for charities. On Dit often publishes content on national and global politics and is an example of student activism at the university. Former writers of the newspaper include politicians Julia Gillard, Christopher Pyne, Penny Wong, Nick Xenophon and John Bannon.

It is the successor to the Varsity Ragge which was founded in 1929. It also published news, poetry and comedic works from various student clubs and societies, including the neighbouring Adelaide Teachers College which later became part of the university campus. According to On Dit, the original newspaper failed due to student apathy. The oldest student-run newspaper dates back to 1889 as the Review, which was previously ran by the Adelaide Medical Students' Society.

The Adelaide University Magazine was another student-run magazine that began printing in 1918. Following the establishment of On Dit as the official organ of the student union, it renamed to the Phoenix in 1935 as a modernist cultural and artistic magazine with literary works including poetry. Following funding cuts in 1940, its editors founded the Angry Penguins which was influential in the then-isolationist Australia as a socially-progressive magazine promoting internationalism. The magazine ceased operations after six years, following the Ern Malley hoax that set back modernism in the country. The magazine was later revived on-and-off the following years as the Phoenix but published its final issue in 1949. Later attempts by the student union in the 1950s to revive the Adelaide University Magazine as a staff and graduate magazine, rather than one focussed on artistic and literary works, failed.

Adelaide University Student Radio was established in 1975 and was the oldest student-run radio program in Australia.

== Annual Prosh ==
The inaugural Prosh Parade following its 1905 formalisation

The student union organises the annual Prosh week events inspired by the medieval tradition of ragging or "an extensive display of noisy disorderly conduct, carried on in defiance of authority or discipline". The annual Procesh procession began in 1905 as a means for students to poke fun at established South Australian institutions, though ragging at the university dates back to the late 19th century. In one example, multiple alarm clocks set and hid by students behind books made constant interruptions during a 1896 ceremony at the former Mitchell Building library. The Prosh parade has in modern times included live band performances on flatbed trucks, student club-made floats and booze cruisers transporting inebriated students. Among notable pranks, students suspended a Holden car on Adelaide University Footbridge in 1971 above the River Torrens as part of Operation Bridge-hang.

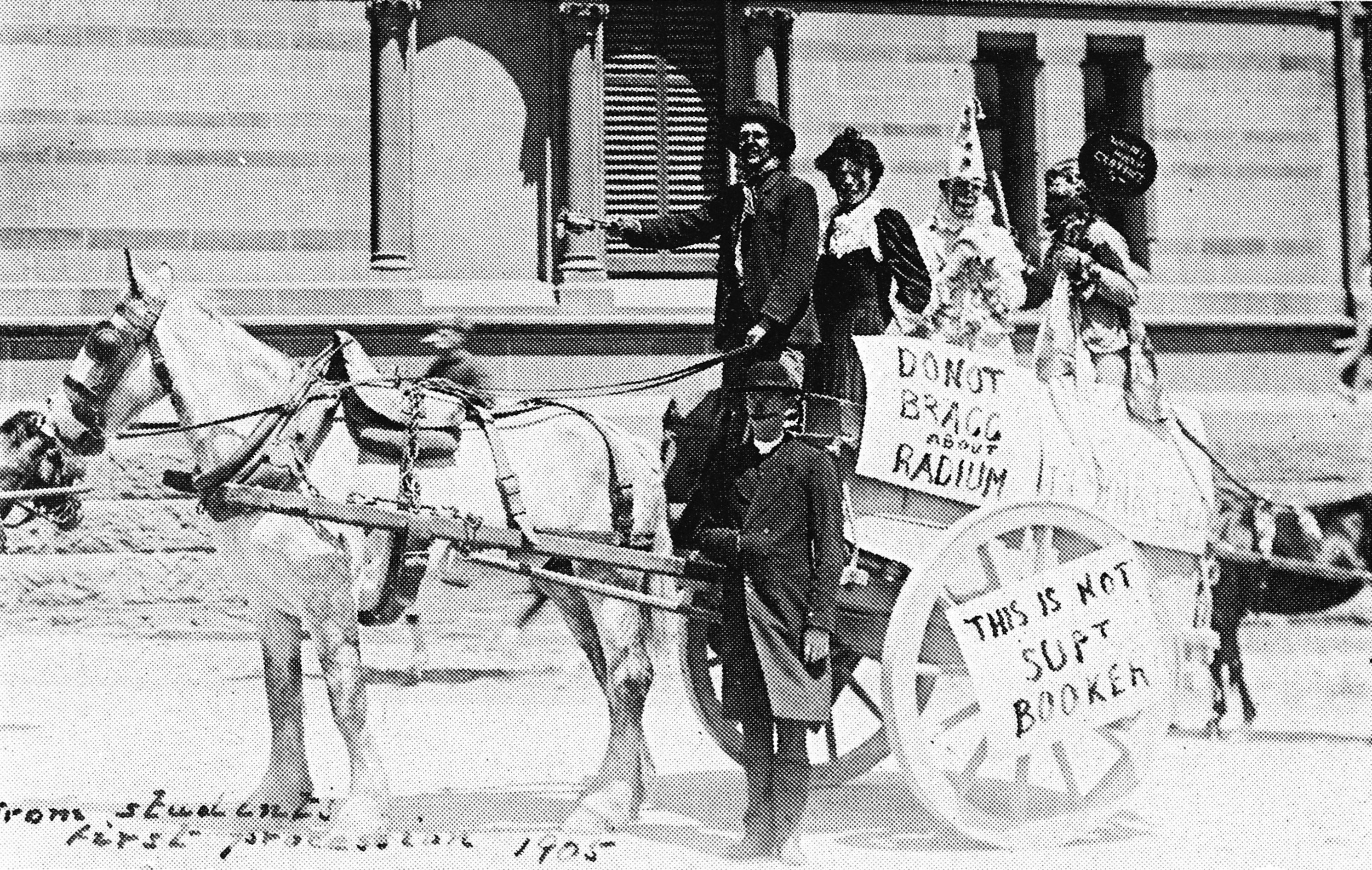
Students on horse cart during the 1905 Prosh Parade with a poster that reads "DO NOT BRAGG ABOUT RADIUM"

Since 1954, the event has also involved the sale of satirical newspapers in public settings. The Prosh Rag, later an annual issue of the On Dit student magazine, contains humorous references to various well-known persons of the day. It has been sold on city streets by students to raise funds for charity as an attempt to legitimise the event following attempts to ban it in the early 1950s. Since at least the 1960s, the event and magazine has often been involved in controversial topics including Australia's involvement in the Vietnam War, apartheid, nuclear warfare, Aboriginal rights and the general administration of the university. Following the end of free university education, the event has toned down in more recent times as a result of increased work commitments by students and the rise of social media for activism. Prosh week winds up with the Prosh After Dark social event in the UniBar which has its origins from the Prosh Ball.
