= Electoral district of Ross Smith =

Former South Australian state electoral district

Ross Smith South Australia—House of Assembly
- State: South Australia
- Created: 1970
- Abolished: 2002
- Namesake: Ross Macpherson Smith
- Demographic: Metropolitan

The electoral district of Ross Smith was an electorate for the South Australian Legislative Assembly. It was replaced by the electoral district of Enfield for the 2002 election. Sir Ross Macpherson Smith was a member of the Australian Light Horse at Gallipoli and Sinai during World War I. He then joined the Australian Flying Corps after learning to fly in Egypt. He and his brother won the 1919 England to Australia air race (taking almost a month) and established an aerodrome at Northfield.

The naming of the seat was unique amongst electoral districts in South Australia, and indeed anywhere within Australia, in that it incorporated the first name of the individual it was named after. Most likely the case for this was to distinguish between Ross Macpherson Smith and Keith Macpherson Smith, who were brothers.

Though typically a safe Labor seat, it returned a marginal result at the 1993 election landslide, with Labor reduced to a 2.1 percent two-party margin. It returned to being a safe Labor seat at the following election.

It is best known as the seat of former Premier John Bannon.

== Members for Ross Smith ==
| Member | Party | Term |
|---|---|---|
| Jack Jennings | Labor | 1970–1977 |
| John Bannon | Labor | 1977–1993 |
| Ralph Clarke | Labor | 1993–2002 |
