= YouX Students Representatives Council =

Students' representative council of the University of Adelaide

YouX Students' Representative Council

History
- Founded: 1895; 131 years ago
- Preceded by: Adelaide University Union Students' Representatives Council (AUU SRC)

Leadership
- SRC President: Edward Archer (Acting)
- General Secretary: Edward Archer

Structure
- Political groups: Left Action (0); Grassroots (0); UNITE (6); Progress (4); Activate (0); Independent (1); Vacant (15)*

Website
- youx.org.au/voice/src/

The YouX Students Representatives Council (YouX SRC), formerly the Adelaide University Union Students' Representatives Council (AUU SRC), is the student representative body at University of Adelaide. Until a restructure in 2007, the students' representative council had been named Students' Association of the University of Adelaide (SAUA).

YouX SRC is one of two governing bodies of YouX, the other being the YouX Board.

== History ==
The Students' Association of the University of Adelaide (SAUA) was a student representative body that existed at the University of Adelaide from 1973 until 2007. It was one of a number of student organisations that was affiliated to and funded by the Adelaide University Union through the government sanctioned 'Union Fee'. Prior to 1973, an SRC had represented student interests at the university. Former Presidents of the SRC include John Bannon, Gordon Bilney and Julia Gillard.

The SAUA had representative members on many of the university's committees, gave comment in the media and made submissions to government inquiries about issues that affected students and young people in general. It also regularly ran events and awareness campaigns.

The SAUA held annual elections to elect students to its various office-bearer positions as well as positions on the governing council. Notable past Presidents include Natasha Stott Despoja, Sarah Hanson-Young, Stephen Mullighan and Christopher Pyne as Vice-President. Other notable past members include Anne McEwen, Andrew Southcott, Peter Malinauskas, David Penberthy and Annabel Crabb.

Due to the introduction of voluntary student unionism by the Howard government, the Adelaide University Union underwent a significant restructure and the SAUA was replaced by an SRC in 2007.

The 2021 student election saw victory of the United Left, a left coalition, with Ana Obradovic elected as the 2022 SRC president.

The AUU was renamed to YouX in 2022, despite significant opposition to the change. In 2022, the YouX Board under Oscar Ong cut funding to the SRC. The majority of the SRC voted on a motion denouncing the funding cut in their first meeting.

== Structure of the SRC ==
As of 2024, the SRC includes the following roles:

- SRC President
- General Secretary
- Education Officer
- Welfare Officer
- Women's Officer
- Queer Officer
- Disability Officer
- Social Justice Officer
- International Officer
- Postgraduate Officer - Coursework
- Postgraduate Officer - Research
- Rural Officer
- Mature Age Officer
- Ethnocultural Officer
- Environment Officer
- Aboriginal and Torres Strait Islander (ATSI) Officer
- Roseworthy Officer
- Waite Officer
- Eight General Councillor positions
- AUU President (Ex Officio)

== Structure of the defunct SAUA ==
In 2011, the structure of the SAUA comprised:

- SAUA President + SAUA Council (8 Elected Members + SAUA Office Bearers)
- Education Department – Education Officer + Education Standing Committee
- Women's Department - Women's Officer + Women's Standing Committee
- Activities and Campaigns Department – Activities Officer + Activities Standing Committee
- Sexuality Department – Male Sexuality Officer, Female Sexuality Officer+ Sexuality standing Committee
- Environment Department – Environment Officer + Environment Standing Committee
- Aboriginal and Torres Strait Islander Department + ATSI Officer + ATSI Standing Committee.

Student Media was not a committee but included annually elected editors – On Dit: Adelaide University Student Newspaper + Student Radio (Broadcast on Radio Adelaide).
