= The Punch (Australia) =

News website

- Founded: 2009
- Dissolved: 15 March 2013
- Country of origin: Australia
- Owner: News Limited
- Editors: David Penberthy, Tory Maguire
- Website: www.thepunch.com.au
- Current status: Defunct

The Punch was an Australian opinion and news website owned by News Limited. It was founded in 2009 and terminated in 2015.

== History ==
Founded in 2009, The Punch was owned and run by News Limited, the Australian holding of News Corporation. The website described itself as being "for every Australian with a passion for debate" and "Australia's best conversation".

In 2009, the staff writers were David Penberthy, Tory Maguire, Paul Colgan, Lucy Kippist, and Leo Shanahan. Tory Shepherd was one of many contributing writers, along with politicians from all sides of politics and assorted journalists, writers, and academics.

Tory Maguire was later editor of the website. Other writers included Anthony Sharwood and Daniel Piotrowski. Some Punch articles were syndicated and republished nationwide in other News Limited tabloids such as The Daily Telegraph.

The site was shut down on 15 March 2013, with future content and Punch staff merged into the News Limited Network and news.com.au newsrooms.
