= Ralph Clarke (Australian politician) =

Australian politician

Deputy Leader of the South Australian Labor Party
- In office 5 November 1994 – 31 December 1996
- Leader: Mike Rann
- Preceded by: Mike Rann
- Succeeded by: Annette Hurley

Member for Ross Smith
- In office 11 December 1993 – 9 February 2002
- Preceded by: John Bannon
- Succeeded by: District abolished

Personal details
- Born: 4 October 1951 (age 74)
- Party: Independent (2002–2006, since 2006)
- Other political affiliations: Labor (until 2002); Independent Ralph Clarke Buy Back ETSA (2006)

Ralph Desmond Clarke (born 4 October 1951) is an Australian former politician. He was a Labor Party member of the South Australian House of Assembly between 1993 and 2002, representing the electorate of Ross Smith. He was the deputy leader of the State Parliamentary Labor Party, and thus the deputy opposition leader, until he was deposed in factional infighting.

Ross Smith was abolished ahead of the 2002 state election, and Clarke tried to follow most of his constituents into the recreated seat of Enfield. Despite a secret ballot showing 60 of the 74 of the members of de-stacked local branches threw their support behind Clarke for 2002 preselection, the state executive intervened to install John Rau, a former colleague of Clarke's in the Centre Left faction who had made the switch to the Right. Clarke ran as an independent and did very well on 23.1%, however with the ALP vote of 39.5% and Liberal vote of 24.1%, he did not get into the two party preferred race for election.

Clarke contested an upper house seat under a banner of "Buy back ETSA" at the 2006 election but failed with only 0.1% of the vote, only 1115 votes.

Prior to entering parliament, Clarke was Secretary of the Federated Clerks' Union (FCU), and later involved with the Australian Services Union.

In October 2007, Clarke was elected as an Area Councillor for the City of Adelaide.

Parliament of South Australia
Preceded by John Bannon	Member for Ross Smith; 1993 – 2002	Division abolished
