= Vincent Powell-Smith =

British barrister, professor of law and legal author

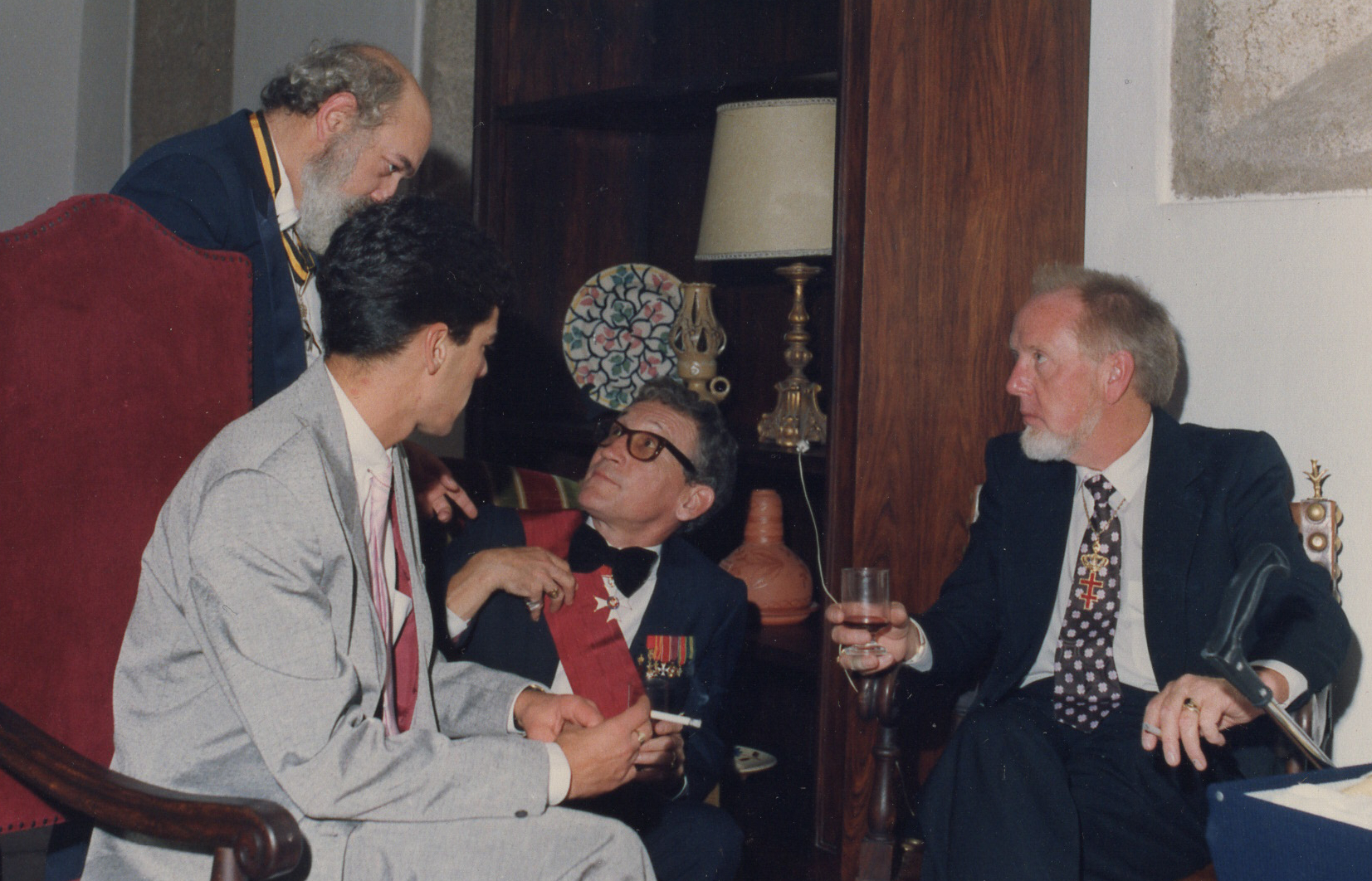
Vincent Powell-Smith (center, seated).

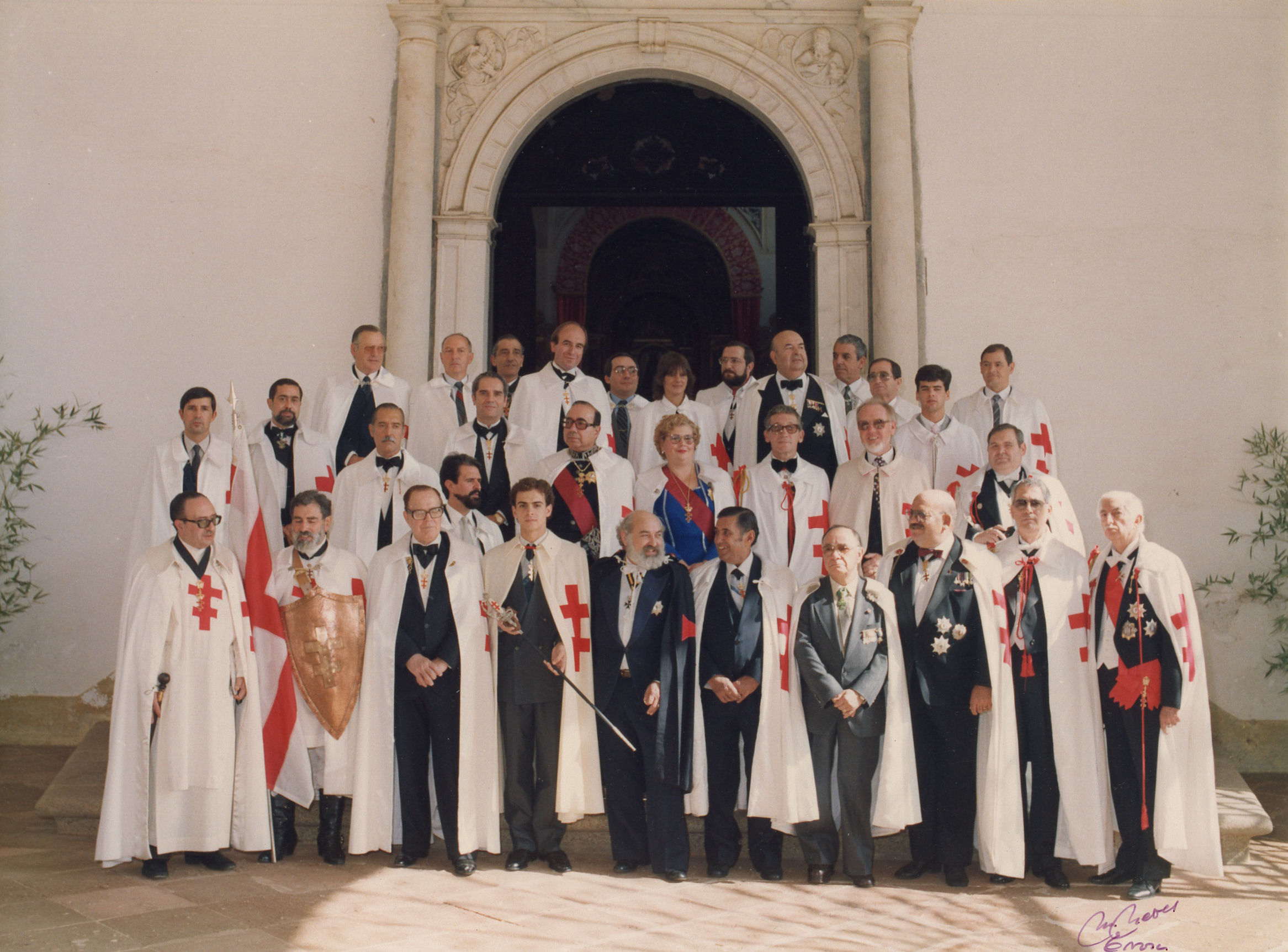
Vincent Powell-Smith (2nd row, 3rd from the right) at Knights Templar's investiture in Évora, Portugal (1987?)

Vincent Powell-Smith (28 April 1939 – 14 May 1997) was a British barrister, professor of law and legal author. He also wrote under the pen names Justiciar and Francis Elphinstone.

Powell-Smith was born in Westerham, Kent, England and died in Kuala Lumpur, Malaysia. He is survived by two daughters, Amanda Jane and Helena Alexia. Powell-Smith was buried at St. Mary's Cathedral, Kuala Lumpur, on 15 May 1997.

== Works ==
- The Building Regulations: Explained And Illustrated
- The Building Regulations Explained and Illustrated for Residential Buildings
- A Building Contract Casebook
- The Transport Act 1968
- The Law Of Boundaries And Fences
- GC/Works/1: The Government General Conditions of Contract for Building and Civil Engineering
- The Contract Journal Contractor's Guide To The General Conditions Of Government Contracts For Building & Civil Engineering Works
- The Law And Practice Relating To Company Directors
- Contractors' Guide to the JCT Standard Form of Building Contract (1988 Legal Studies & Services Ltd)
- Problems in Construction Claims (1990 BSP Professional Books)
- Casebook On Contract
- Modern View of the Law for Builders and Surveyors
- Contract
- Construction Law Reports: V. 7
- Construction Law Reports: V. 11
- Questions And Answers On "A" Level Law

=== Co-authored ===
- Powell-Smith & Furmston's Building Contract Casebook (with M.P. Furmston)(1984; 1987; 1990; 2000 Blackwell Science Ltd)
- The Building Regulations: Explained & Illustrated (with W.S. Whyte, M.J. Billington)
- Means of Escape from Fire (with Alex Copping, Anthony Ferguson, Michael J Billington)
- Civil Engineering Claims (with Douglas Stephenson, John Redmond)(1989 BSP Professional Books)

With John Sims

- Building Contract Claims (1983, 1988 BSP Professional Books)
- Determination And Suspension Of Construction Contracts

With John Sims and Christopher Dancaster

- Construction Arbitrations: A Practical Guide (1989 Legal Studies & Services Ltd)
- Contract Documentation For Contractors

With Jeremy Houghton-Brown

- Horse and Stable Management
- Horse Business Management

With David Chappell

- Building Contracts Compared And Tabulated (1986 Architectural Press Ltd; 1989 Legal Studies & Services (Publishing) Ltd)
- Joint Contracts Tribunal Intermediate Form Of Contract: A Practical Guide (1991 Legal Studies & Services (Publishing) Ltd; 1999 Blackwell Science Ltd)
- JCT Intermediate Form of Contract: An Architect's Guide (1985 Architectural Press Ltd)
- Building Contract Claims (also with John Sims 1998, 2005 Blackwell Publishing Ltd)
- JCT Minor Works Form of Contract: An Architect's Guide (1985 Architectural Press Ltd)
- JCT Minor Works Form of Contract: A Practical Guide (1990 Legal Studies & Services (Publishing) Ltd; 1999 Blackwell Science Ltd)
- Building Contract Dictionary (1985 Architectural Press Ltd; 1990 Legal Studies & Services (Publishing) Ltd)
- Engineering Contract Dictionary (also with Derek Simmonds) (1989 Legal Studies & Services (Publishing) Ltd)
- The JCT Design and Build Contract (1993 Blackwell Scientific Publications; 1999 Blackwell Science Ltd)
- Building Sub-Contract Documentation (1994 Blackwell Scientific Publications)

== Legacy ==
- The Vincent Powell-Smith Prize Essay Writing Competition is presented by The Malaysian Society of Construction Law
