= John Bannon =

Australian politician and academic (1943–2015)

The Honourable Dr John Bannon AO
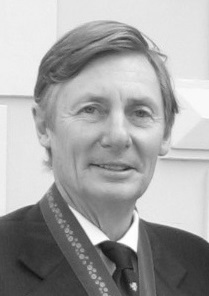
- Bannon in 2007

39th Premier of South Australia
- In office 10 November 1982 – 4 September 1992
- Monarch: Elizabeth II
- Governor: Sir Donald Dunstan; Dame Roma Mitchell
- Deputy: John Wright (1982–1985); Don Hopgood (1985–1992)
- Preceded by: David Tonkin
- Succeeded by: Lynn Arnold

Leader of the Opposition in South Australia
- In office 2 October 1979 – 10 November 1982
- Premier: David Tonkin
- Deputy: Jack Wright
- Preceded by: Des Corcoran
- Succeeded by: John Olsen

President of the Australian Labor Party
- In office 7 April 1988 – 25 June 1991
- Preceded by: Mick Young
- Succeeded by: Stephen Loosley

Leader of the South Australian Labor Party
- In office 2 October 1979 – 4 September 1992
- Deputy: Jack Wright; Dr Don Hopgood
- Preceded by: Des Corcoran
- Succeeded by: Lynn Arnold

Treasurer of South Australia
- In office 10 November 1982 – 4 September 1992
- Premier: John Bannon
- Preceded by: David Tonkin
- Succeeded by: Frank Blevins

Member of the South Australian House of Assembly for Ross Smith
- In office 17 September 1977 – 10 December 1993
- Preceded by: Jack Jennings
- Succeeded by: Ralph Clarke

Personal details
- Born: John Charles Bannon; 7 May 1943 Bendigo, Victoria
- Died: 13 December 2015 (aged 72) Adelaide, South Australia
- Party: Australian Labor Party (SA)
- Education: University of Adelaide (BA, LLB); Flinders University (PhD)

John Charles Bannon AO (7 May 1943 – 13 December 2015) was an Australian politician and academic. He was the 39th Premier of South Australia, leading the South Australian Branch of the Australian Labor Party from a single term in opposition back to government at the 1982 election.

At the 1985 election Bannon's government was re-elected with an increased majority, but it was reduced to minority government status at the 1989 election. In 1992 Bannon became Labor's longest-serving and South Australia's second longest-serving Premier. As a result of the State Bank collapse, he resigned as Premier in 1992, and from parliament at the 1993 election landslide. He was also an academic and the Head of St Mark's College.

== Early life ==
Bannon was born in Bendigo. His father was prize-winning artist Charles Bannon. He attended East Adelaide Primary School and St Peter's College in Adelaide, where his father taught art, and was awarded the Tennyson Medal in 1961. He completed degrees in Arts and Law at the University of Adelaide. While at university, he was co-editor of the student newspaper On Dit along with Ken Scott and Jacqui Dibden in 1964. He was president of the Adelaide University Student Representative Council in 1966–67, president of the Adelaide University Union in 1969–1971 and president of the National Union of Australian University Students in 1968. Following the completion of his studies, he was an advisor to various governments, including Whitlam's.

== Political career ==
He was elected to Ross Smith in the South Australian House of Assembly at the 1977 election and promoted to cabinet within a year. Following the resignation of Premier Don Dunstan and Labor's loss in the 1979 election, Bannon was elected to the Labor leadership. Despite factional struggles within Labor, the Tonkin Liberal government oversaw the economy suffer through the early 1980s recession. After just one term, Bannon managed to return Labor to government at the 1982 election with a 5.9 percent two-party swing but only a one-seat majority.

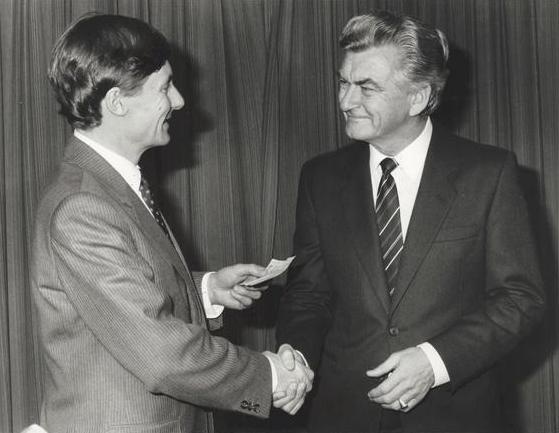
Bannon (left) receives cheque from Prime Minister Bob Hawke for bushfire relief

While there had been a stream of social reform during Don Dunstan's 1970–79 premiership, Bannon's priorities were oriented in economics. Bannon government achievements include the Olympic Dam copper and uranium mine, the submarine project, the defence industry, the Hyatt and Adelaide Casino complex, conversion of part of the Adelaide railway station into the Adelaide Convention Centre, construction of the O-Bahn Busway from 1983 to the 1986 to 1989 planning and construction of the Tea Tree Gully O-Bahn extension, and the Formula One Grand Prix. The government also sold land reserved for freeways under the MATS plan. Poker machines were introduced in South Australia, a decision Bannon would come to regret decades later. Other measures were introduced such as action to prevent destruction of vegetation and urban renewal programmes to invigorate some of the declining inner suburbs in Adelaide.

The economic situation, very difficult in the early 80s, improved substantially in 1983–84. Bannon's government was easily re-elected at the 1985 election, achieving a 2.2 percent two-party swing towards them from the Liberal opposition and a four-seat majority. However, the economy experienced another downturn in the late 80s/early 90s recession, and Bannon paid the price at the 1989 election, when the ALP won only 48 percent of the two-party vote: a swing of 5.2 percent against it. Both major parties won 22 seats each in the hung parliament, two short of a majority. Labor was able to form minority government with the confidence and supply support of the two Labor independent MPs, Martyn Evans and Norm Peterson. Peterson became Speaker of the South Australian House of Assembly following the election. Shortly thereafter, electoral legislation was passed with the objective that the party which receives over 50 percent of the statewide two-party vote at the forthcoming election should win the two-party vote in a majority of seats, through a compulsory strategic redrawing of electoral boundaries before each election, making South Australia the only state to do so. One element of the Playmander remains to this day which contributes to the above: the change from multi-member to single-member seats. It was only the second time that a Labor government in South Australia had been re-elected for a third term (the first time was when Dunstan won in 1977). In April 1988, Bannon was elected Federal President of the Labor Party. He held that position until June 1991.

=== State Bank and resignation ===
Bad lending decisions made by the State Bank of South Australia's board and managing director Tim Marcus Clark were exposed. As the bank's owner, the government was the guarantor of $3 billion worth of loans. Bannon remained as Premier during three inquiries, the last two of which cleared him of any deliberate wrongdoing. Upon resigning as head of government, he announced that he would not contest his seat of Ross Smith in the coming election. Lynn Arnold replaced Bannon as Premier but was unable to stave off a landslide defeat at the 1993 election. Labor achieved just 39.1 percent of the two-party vote, and suffered a swing of 8.9 percent against it. As a result, it retained only 10 seats in a house of 47. Ross Smith was among the seats Labor retained despite suffering a 16% swing against it in its primary vote and an almost 11% swing against it in the two-party preferred vote.

== Later life ==
In 1994, the Australian Broadcasting Corporation offered Bannon a directorial position, which he accepted. With an interest in South Australian history, he researched at Flinders University. He later studied and obtained a Doctor of Philosophy degree in Australian political history at Flinders University, where he was a professor. He was also an adjunct professor at the University of Adelaide Law School and in 2014 he received an honorary doctorate from the university. He was Master of St Mark's College in Adelaide, from 2000 to 2007. On Australia Day 2007, he was appointed an Officer of the Order of Australia. He wrote Supreme Federalist: The political life of Sir John Downer, which was released in 2009.

== Personal life ==
Bannon's first wife was Supreme Court Justice Robyn Layton, with whom he had a daughter, Victoria. His second wife, Angela, is the mother of musician and television personality Dylan Lewis. Bannon's younger brother Nicholas died in Wilpena Pound in 1959.

Bannon was a good runner, completing the Adelaide Marathon 28 times, 11 of them in less than 3 hours. His best performance was the 1983 Adelaide Marathon, which he ran in a time of 2:44:34. He was premier at the time.

== Death ==
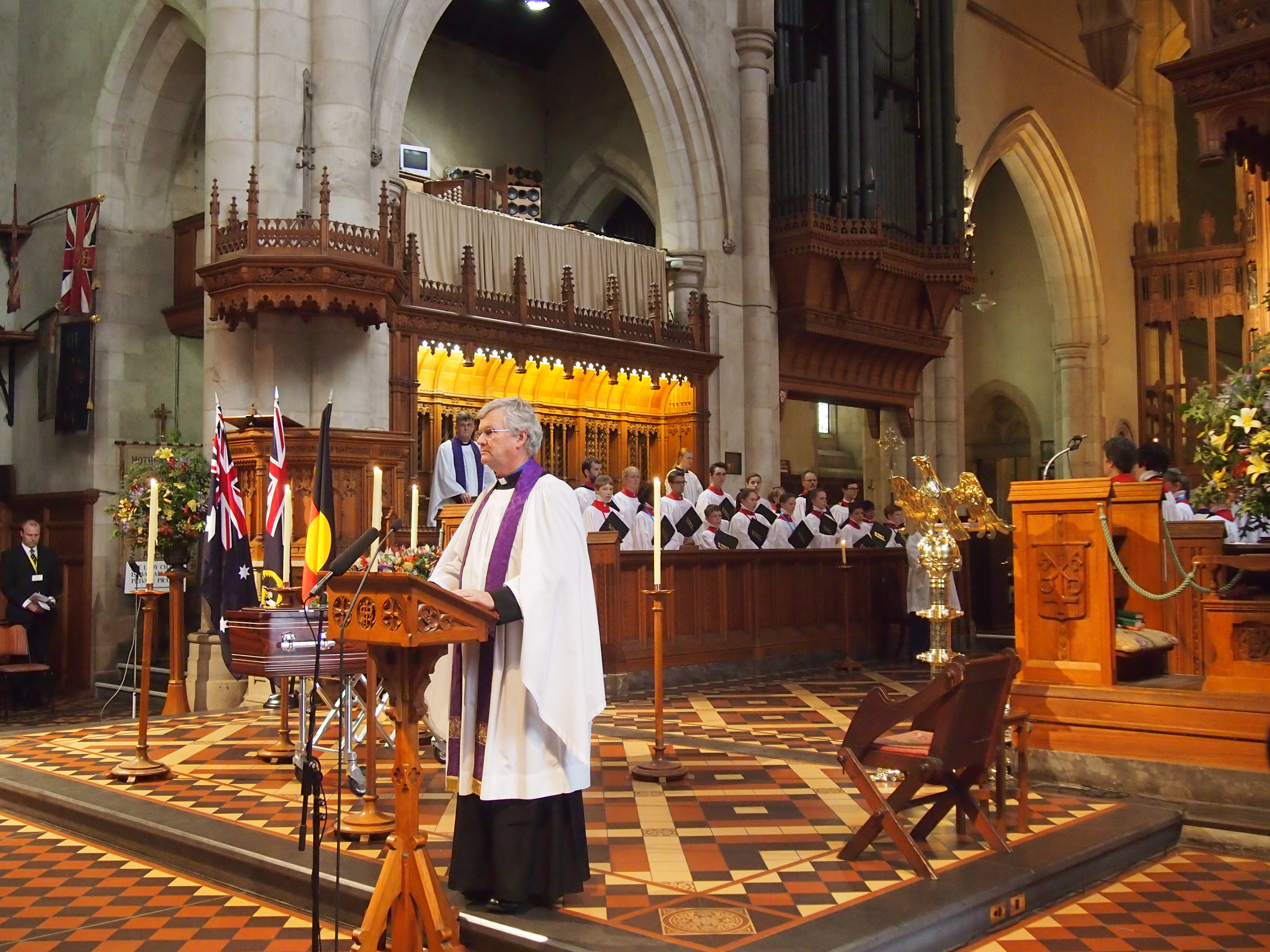
The Dean of St Peter's Cathedral, the Very Reverend Frank Nelson, officiating at Bannon's state funeral.

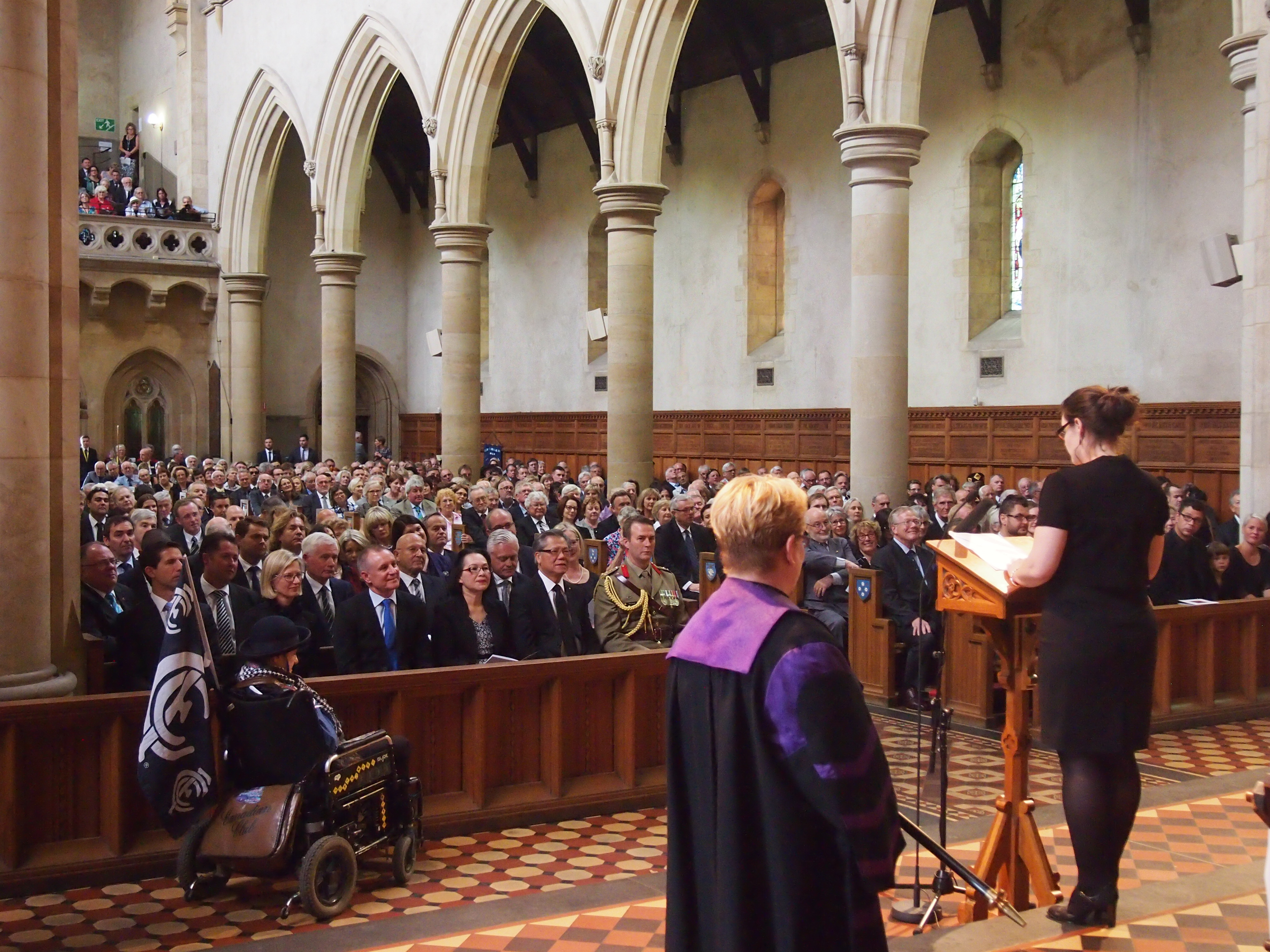
Victoria Bannon eulogising her father at his state funeral.

Bannon died of cancer on 13 December 2015, aged 72, and was active right up until his death. He was given a state funeral on 21 December 2015.

== Notes ==
Political offices
Preceded by David Tonkin	Leader of the Opposition of South Australia; 1979–1982	Succeeded by John Olsen
Preceded by David Tonkin	Premier of South Australia; 1982–1992	Succeeded by Lynn Arnold
Preceded by David Tonkin	Treasurer of South Australia; 1982–1992	Succeeded by Frank Blevins
Parliament of South Australia
Preceded by Jack Jennings	Member for Ross Smith; 1977–1993	Succeeded by Ralph Clarke
Party political offices
Preceded by Des Corcoran	Leader of the Australian Labor Party (South Australian Branch); 1979–1992	Succeeded by Lynn Arnold
