= Pelican (magazine) =

University of Western Australia's student magazine

- Type: Student newspaper
- Format: Magazine
- Owner: University of Western Australia Student Guild
- Founded: 1929
- Language: English
- Headquarters: Perth, Western Australia
- Website: www.pelicanmagazine.com.au

Pelican is the University of Western Australia's student magazine. It is financed by the UWA Guild with approximately 1,000 copies of each issue published and distributed around the university campus. It is Australia's second oldest student paper, having begun publication in 1929.

Pelican publishes six print editions per year. Pelican is aimed at Perth's tertiary students and young people aged between 18 and 28 frequenting the inner-metropolitan area. Each print edition is centred on a theme, and includes regular reviews (books, music, television, film, and arts); opinion pieces; campus news; and current affairs analysis.

== History ==
Founded in 1929, Pelican lays claim to being the country's second-oldest student newspaper, after Farrago.

Originally, Pelican took the form of a weekly current affairs broadsheet. Geoffrey Bolton's anecdotes of the 1950s Pelican notes the involvement of Rolf Harris and John Stone. It also had various fluctuations in its publication. Before the student union had its own building in more recent years, the publication's office was in what has since reverted to university usage.

Over the years, it has moved between being a "tabloid"-sized magazine, and having both glossy finishes and newspaper print covers. It became an ongoing tradition that the Pelican editor appears naked on the cover of the final edition, although it is unknown when this tradition began. Research by former Pelican editor Henry Skerritt, published in his final editorial of 2000, suggests that this tradition began in 1972.

== Content ==
Typically, each edition of Pelican circulates around a particular theme. Each issue also includes articles that deal more broadly with politics, popular culture, and aspects of the student lifestyle. Pelican also includes coverage of music, books, film, television, and the arts. These are ordered within individual sub-sections, each of which is coordinated by a different section editor.

=== Voluntary student unionism ===
The implementation of voluntary student unionism in 2006 had a significant impact on the viability of student newspapers across Australia, compulsory student union membership fees having been the major source of income for most. Pelican is one of the few Australian papers to have not been affected by these changes, and this can be largely attributed to the high voluntary membership intake of the University of Western Australia Student Guild.

=== Controversy ===
In late 2007, in the lead up to the federal election of that year, UWA student and Australian Labor Party candidate for the seat of O'Connor, Dominic Rose, was caught up in a national controversy over an article published in Pelican. It was revealed that some time before his preselection, the student had written a piece in which he referred to then Labor Party leader and Prime Ministerial hopeful Kevin Rudd as a "filthy Liberal". The story was carried nationally and appeared in major publications, including The Age, news.com.au, The Herald Sun, and the national broadsheet The Australian.
