= Henneh Kyereh Kwaku =

Ghanaian poet, public health and health communication scholar

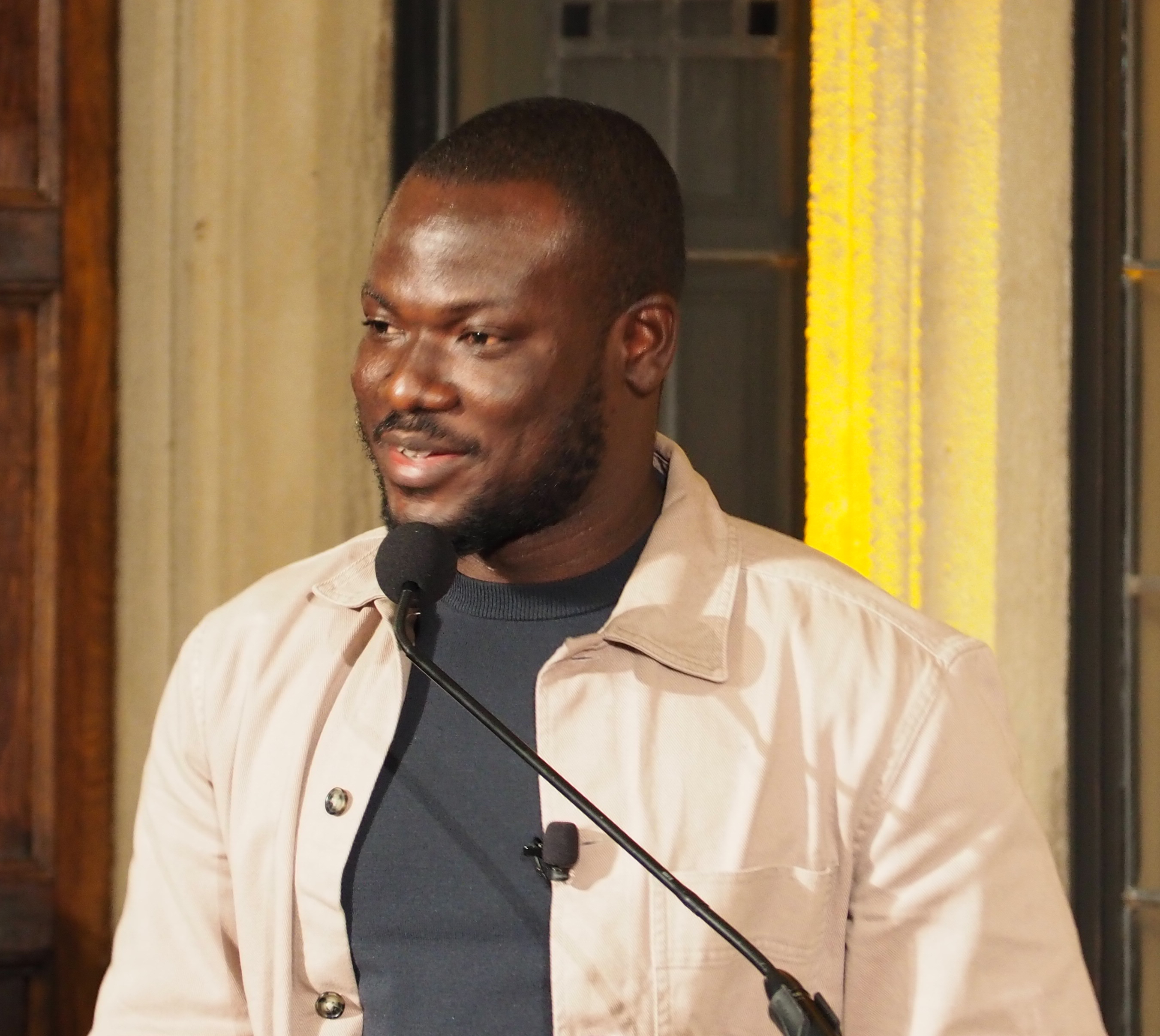
- Kwaku in 2024
- Born: Gonasua (Drobo), Ghana
- Education: University of Health and Allied Sciences (BPH); University of Cape Coast (MA); Chapman University (MFA)
- Occupations: Poet, educator, scholar
- Employer: Chapman University
- Writing career
- Language: English, Twi
- Years active: 2010s–present
- Genre: Poetry
- Subjects: Environmental justice, collective memory, health equity
- Notable work: Revolution of the Scavengers

Henneh Kyereh Kwaku is a Ghanaian poet, educator, and public health scholar whose work bridges the creative arts and health communication. He is the author of Revolution of the Scavengers, selected by Kwame Dawes and Chris Abani for the African Poetry Book Fund, and a recipient of the 2024 J. Howard and Barbara M.J. Wood Prize from Poetry Magazine. His writing engages themes of environmental justice, collective memory, and health equity.

== Early life and education ==
Kwaku was born in Gonasua and raised in Drobo in the Bono Region of Ghana. Growing up in Ghana, Kwaku attended the University of Health and Allied Sciences, where he graduated with a Bachelor of Public Health, Disease Control from the Fred N. Binka School of Public Health. He earned his master's degree in health education from the University of Cape Coast and an MFA in creative writing from Chapman University in California, where he was later nominated for the James L. Doti Outstanding Graduate Award.

== Career ==
=== Poetry and literature ===
Kwaku is the author of Revolution of the Scavengers (African Poetry Book Fund / Akashic Books) selected and edited by Kwame Dawes and Chris Abani. His poems have appeared in reputable publications, including Poetry Magazine, World Literature Today, Poets.org, and Lolwe. Writing about Revolution of the Scavengers for Tupelo Quarterly, Henk Rossouw says: "Kwaku takes great care to ground his sonic deftness and strong imagery in the daily concerns and material conditions of everyday Ghanaians, which then offers a choral and democratic echo to the insights of his speaker."

Kwaku is the founder of The Church of Poetry Podcast on X (Twitter) Spaces; a platform where he hosts literary conversations and readings. Kwaku is the host and producer of The Art and Health Show on Chapman Radio and he has served as an editor and communications coordinator for various journals, including Tab Journal and the Contemporary Ghanaian Writers' Series. Additionally, he was an assistant editor for Olongo Africa and Ghana Writes. He has been interviewed or profiled on 20.35 Africa, Praxis Magazine, African Poetry Book Fund, Tupelo Quarterly and The Movee.

Kwaku's co-authored article in Wiley's Journal of Diabetes Research (3.8 impact factor) was among top ten most cited articles in 2023. Kwaku's work has been presented at conferences such as Eastern Communication Association and the Society for Public Health Education. Kwaku is also a Certified Health Education Specialist, accredited by the National Commission for Health Education Credentialing.

== Honours and awards ==
In 2024, Kwaku received the J. Howard and Barbara M.J. Wood Prize from the Poetry magazine (Poetry Foundation), he was awarded the Samira Bawumia Literary Prize for Nonfiction (2022) and Poetry (2020) making him notable for winning the award in two different categories. He has also received fellowships from Carolyn Moore Writing Residency (2025), Library of Africa and the African Diaspora WAW Residency (2022). Kwaku was nominated for the James L. Doti Outstanding Graduate, which "is conferred annually to the outstanding graduating master’s and doctoral students with distinguished records of academic accomplishment, scholarship, and/or service" at Chapman University. Dr Anna Leahy described Kwaku as "shaping the future of Chapman."

== Selected publications ==
=== Books ===
- Revolution of the Scavengers

=== As editor/co-editor ===
- Equanimity
- Roots
- Homecoming
- A Voice is a Voice

=== Journal articles ===
- "In Praise"
- "Reading an Aubade to Your Absence"
- "A Short Note on Writing a Joyful Poem"
- "Gaana & Other Poems"

=== Works in anthologies ===
- "Perhaps Ananse Speaks"
