= Community health =

Field of public health

Public Health Training and awareness campaign

Community health refers to non-treatment based health services that are delivered outside hospitals and clinics. Community health is a subset of public health that is taught to and practiced by clinicians as part of their normal duties. Community health volunteers and community health workers work with primary care providers to facilitate entry into, exit from and utilization of the formal health system by community members as well as providing supplementary services such as support groups or wellness events that are not offered by medical institutions.

Community health is a major field of study within the medical and clinical sciences which focuses on the maintenance, protection, and improvement of the health status of population groups and communities, in particular those who are a part of disadvantaged communities. It is a distinct field of study that may be taught within a separate school of public health or preventive healthcare. The World Health Organization defines community health as:

Environmental, Social, and Economic resources to sustain emotional and physical well being among people in ways that advance their aspirations and satisfy their needs in their unique environment.

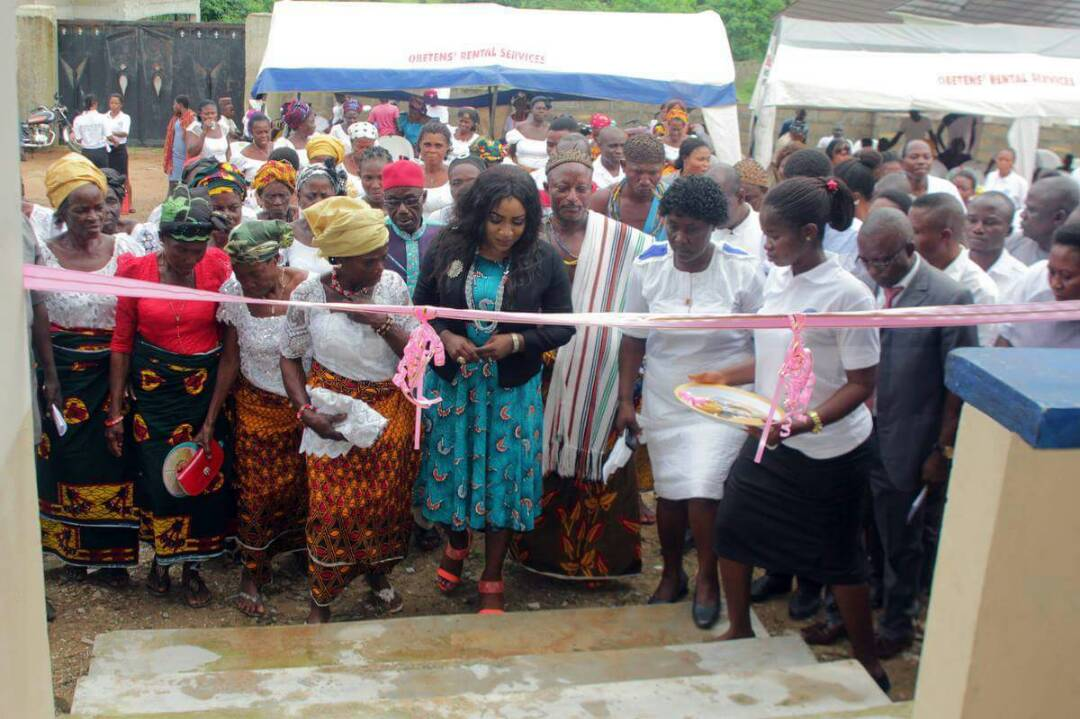
Commissioning of Nko health center by the Cross River State commissioner for health: A form of medical intervention

Medical interventions that occur in communities can be classified as three categories: Primary care, Secondary care, and Tertiary care. Each category focuses on a different level and approach towards the community or population group. In the United States, Community health is rooted within Primary healthcare achievements. Primary healthcare programs aim to reduce risk factors and increase health promotion and prevention. Secondary healthcare is related to "hospital care" where acute care is administered in a hospital department setting. Tertiary healthcare refers to highly specialized care usually involving disease or disability management.

Community health services are classified into categories including:

1. Preventive health services such as chemoprophylaxis for tuberculosis, cancer screening and treatment of diabetes and hypertension.
2. Promotive health services such as health education, family planning, vaccination and nutritional supplementation
3. Curative health services such as treatment of jiggers, lice infestation, malaria and pneumonia.
4. Rehabilitative health services such as provision of prosthetics, social work, occupational therapy, physical therapy, counseling and other mental health services.

== Community health workers and volunteers ==
Community health workers (also known as community health assistants and community health officers) are local public health workers with a deep understanding of their community's health needs and challenges. They serve as a bridge between their community and local health systems to ensure high quality and culturally competent service delivery. They have vocational, professional or academic qualifications which enable them to provide training, supervisory, administrative, teaching and research services in community health departments.

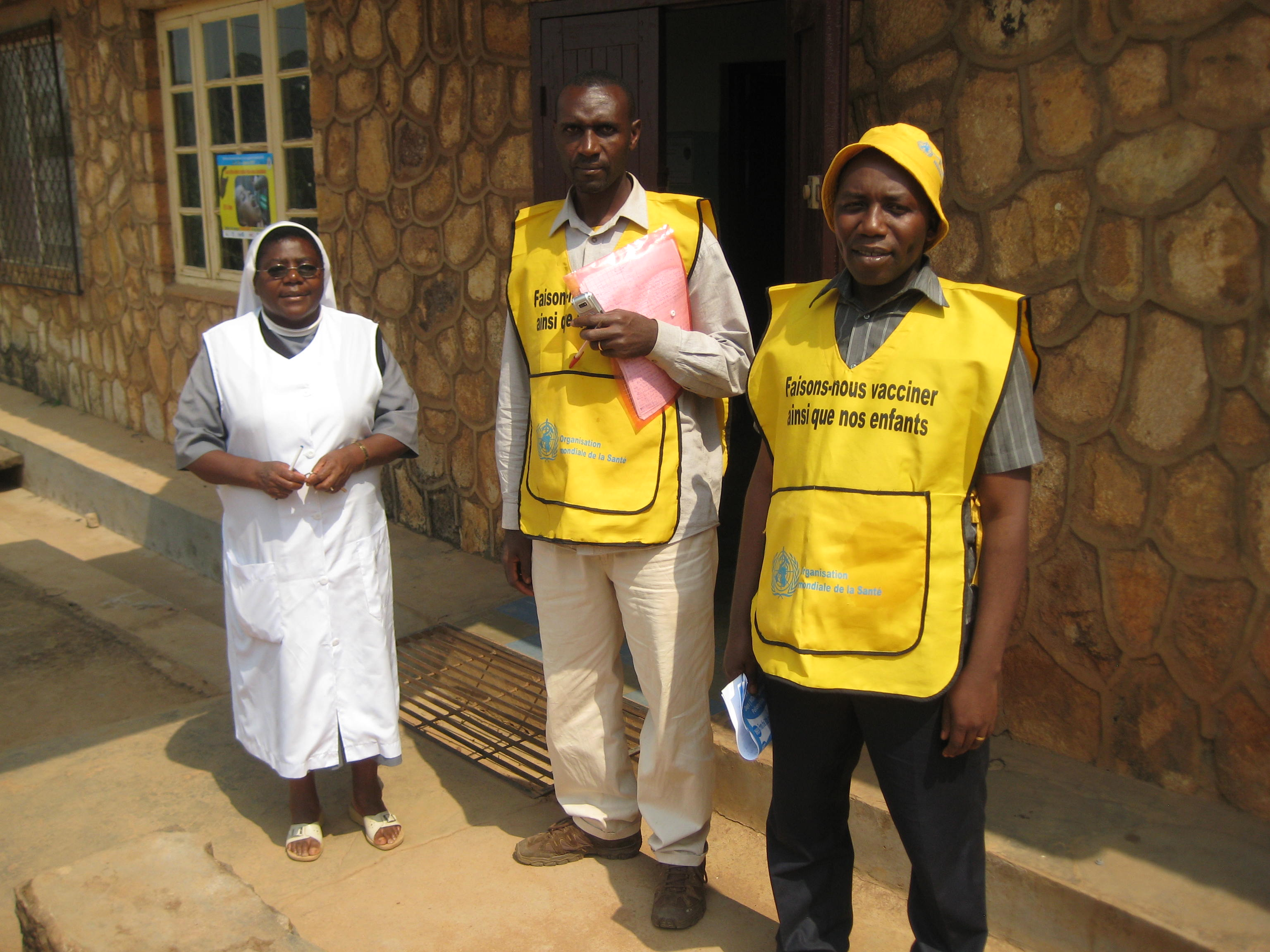
A team of community health volunteers

Community health volunteers are members of a local community who have experience and training on the health problems prevalent in their community and care services available, in order to identify and link those in need with local providers. Community health volunteers may be referred to by different titles depending on their local health system; these titles can included lay health workers, health volunteers, village health agents, non-specialist healthcare providers, and village health agents.

Community health volunteers provide basic services such as distribution of water chlorination tablets, mosquito nets and health education material. They will involve or work with registered clinicians when they encounter sick or recovering patients or those with complex or ongoing needs.

Community health organizations are non-profit and non government organization which administers and coordinates the delivery of health care services to people living in a designated community or neighborhood. It helps people understand their status of health or social conditions. Providing advocacy for those who need it and holding groups and individual meetings with people in the community. The vital role is advocating for the rights and interests of their community members. They raise awareness about issues affecting their community by research, dialogues and lobby for policies and programs that address those issues.

== Measuring Community health ==
Community health is generally measured by geographical information systems (GIS) and demographic data. Geographic Information Systems can be used to define sub-communities when neighborhood location data is not enough. Traditionally Community health has been measured using sampling data which was then compared to well-known data sets, like the National Health Interview Survey or National Health and Nutrition Examination Survey. With technological development, information systems could store more data for small-scale communities, cities, and towns; as opposed to census data that only generalize information about small populations based on the overall population. GIS can give more precise information about community resources, even at neighborhood levels. The ease of use of GIS, advances in multilevel statistics, and spatial analysis methods make it easier for researchers to procure and generate data related to the built environment.

Social media can also play a big role in health information analytics. Studies have found social media being capable of influencing people to change their unhealthy behaviors and encourage interventions capable of improving health status. Social media statistics combined with GIS may provide researchers with a more complete image of community standards for health and well being.

== Categories of Community Health ==
=== Primary Healthcare and Primary Prevention ===
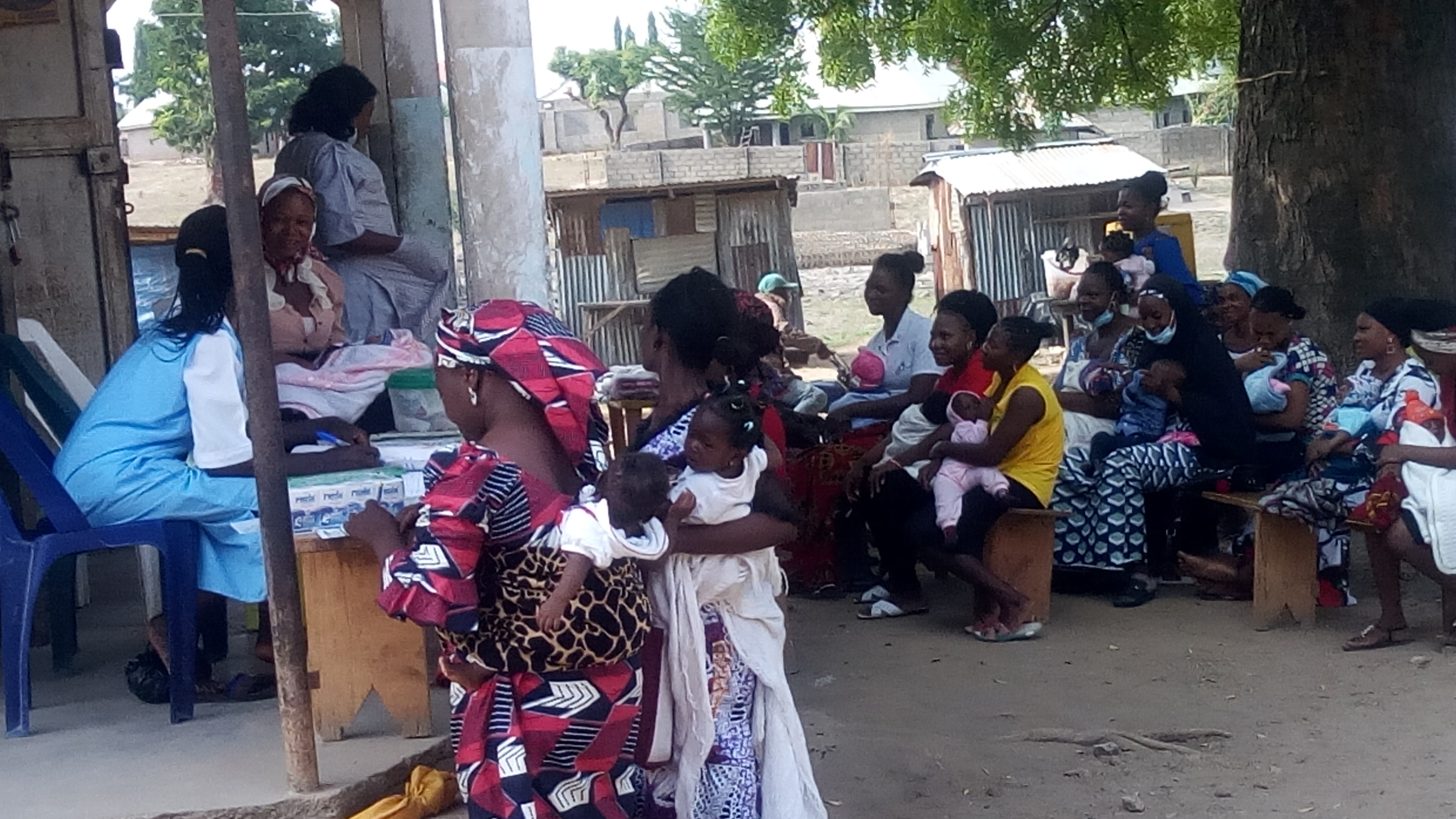
Mothers registering their children during immunization at primary health center in Masaka, Uganda

Community-based health promotion emphasizes Primary Prevention and population-based perspective (traditional prevention). It is the goal of Community Health to have individuals in a certain community improve their lifestyle or seek medical attention. Primary Healthcare is provided by health professionals, specifically the ones a patient sees first that may refer them to Secondary or Tertiary care.

Primary prevention refers to the early avoidance and identification of risk factors that may lead to certain diseases and disabilities. Community-focused efforts including immunizations, classroom teaching, and awareness campaigns are all good examples of how primary prevention techniques are utilized by communities to change certain health behaviors. Prevention programs, if carefully designed and drafted, can effectively prevent problems that children and adolescents face as they grow up. This finding also applies to all groups and classes of people. Prevention programs are one of the most effective tools health professionals can use to significantly impact individual, population, and community health.

=== Secondary Healthcare and Secondary Prevention ===
Community health can also be improved with improvements in individuals' environments. Community health status is determined by the environmental characteristics, behavioral characteristics, social cohesion in the environment of that community. Appropriate modifications in the environment can help to prevent unhealthy behaviors and negative health outcomes.

Secondary prevention refers to improvements made in a patient's lifestyle or environment after the onset of disease or disability. This sort of prevention works to make life easier for the patient since it is too late to prevent them from their current disease or disability. An example of secondary prevention is when those with occupational low back pain are provided with strategies to stop their health status from worsening; the prospects of secondary prevention may even hold more promise than primary prevention in this case.

=== Tertiary Healthcare ===
In Tertiary healthcare, community health can only be affected with professional medical care involving the entire population. Patients need to be referred to specialists and undergo advanced medical treatment. In some countries, there are more sub-specialties of medical professions than there are primary care specialists. Health inequalities are directly related to social advantage and social resources.

Aspects That Distinguish Conventional Health-Care Versus People-Centered Primary Care
Conventional Ambulatory Medical Care In Clinics or Outpatient Departments	Disease Control Programs	People-Centered Primary Care
Focus on illness and cure	Focus on priority diseases	Focus on health needs
Relationship limited to the moment of consultation	Relationship limited to program implementation	Enduring personal relationship
Episodic curative care	Program-defined disease control interventions	Comprehensive, continuous and personcentred care
Responsibility limited to effective and safe advice to the patient at the moment of consultation	Responsibility for disease-control targets among the target population	Responsibility for the health of all in the community along the life cycle; responsibility for tackling determinants of ill-health
Users are consumers of the care they purchase	Population groups are targets of disease-control interventions	People are partners in managing their own health and that of their community

== Challenges and difficulties in community health ==
The complexity of community health and its various problems can make it difficult for researchers to assess and identify solutions. Community-Based Participatory Research (CBPR) is a unique alternative that combines community participation, inquiry, and action. Community-Based Participatory Research (CBPR) helps researchers address community issues with a broader lens and also works with the people in the community to find culturally sensitive, valid, and reliable methods and approaches.

Community health also requires clear communication to properly address health issues, disparities, and complications. Health communication is the concept that applies communication evidence, strategy, theory, and creativity to promote behaviors, policies, and practices that advance the health and well-being of people and populations. Communicating health care can be limited by a few factors, which are important to recognize to best apply community health practices. To better understand and provide community health from a provider and consumer perspective, limitations in concepts such as scientific complexity or uncertainty. When using an example such as environmental health, scientific complexity can be summarized with environmental health risks that often involve complex scientific concepts that can be difficult to understand for someone without the technical knowledge gained from specialized training or education. The use of plain language and visual aids helps to simplify complex information and increase accessibility. Uncertainty in community health exists when the scientific understanding of environmental health risks may be incomplete or uncertain. Knowing details about how communities work, specific to the individual, can also play a role in a better understanding as well as offering complete transparency about the limitations of knowledge and ongoing research efforts. Preventative actions must be taken to prevent misinformation in the face of uncertainty as it can cause grave circumstances as seen during the COVID-19 pandemic. Scientific complexity and uncertainty are concepts that can make it difficult to understand the environment and limits coherent communication about population health. Examples of successful community health initiatives can include projects addressing the issues that complicate the subject. For example, promotions for understanding, as well as initiatives working towards already acknowledged health issues in each community.

Patients with limited-English proficiency especially struggle to access health and turn to community health centers. Community health carries the burden of serving such patients. There is a need to invest more in the interpreter workforce (in both quantity and quality), letting those with limited-English proficiency know more about their rights currently available to them, potential legal avenues to take if said rights are not being provided, and increased awareness for non-verbal communication. Executive Order 13166 (2000), titled Improving Access to Services for Persons with Limited English Proficiency, offered continuing education for health professionals, certification of healthcare interpreters, and reimbursement for language services for Medicaid/ State Children's Health Insurance Program (SCHIP) enrollees in order to address the institutional issues regarding language barriers in our current healthcare system. Another avenue that has been taken is local governments partnering with community-based organizations, such as the collaboration between Alameda County and the Korean Community Center of the East Bay (KCCEB) to create RICE, the Refugee and Immigrant Collaborative for Empowerment, a coalition mobilized by various multiethnic and multilingual organizations. They partnered in 2020 during the height of the pandemic in order to support COVID-19 testing and increase vaccine awareness and accessibility across 16 language groups.

Other issues involve access and cost of medical care. A great majority of the world does not have adequate health insurance. In low-income countries, less than 40% of total health expenditures are paid for by the governments.

In the United States, the Affordable Care Act (ACA) changed the way community health centers operate and the policies that were in place, greatly influencing community health. The ACA directly affected community health centers by increasing funding, expanding insurance coverage for Medicaid, reforming the Medicaid payment system, appropriating $1.5 billion to increase the workforce and promote training. The impact, importance, and success of the Affordable Care Act is still being studied and will have a large impact on how ensuring health can affect community standards on health and also individual health.

Ethnic disparities in health statuses among different communities are also a cause of concern. Community coalition-driven interventions may bring benefits to this segment of society. This also relates to language usage, where results from a 2019 systematic review found that patients with limited English proficiency who received care from physicians who communicate in the patient's own preferred language generally had improved health outcomes.

== Community health resolutions ==
Each community is different and should create its own Community Health Improvement Process (CHIP). CHIP consists of problem identification and prioritization cycle along with an analysis and implementation cycle. Five strategies that assist the CHIP process are improving community health and well-being; community involvement, political commitment; healthy public policy; multi-sectoral collaboration; and asset-based community development. An asset-based approach involves empowering individuals and communities by focusing on community strengths along with the skills of the individuals.

The CDC states that "Individuals who are in good physical shape, have proper vaccination, have access to clinical services and medications, and know where to get critical health and emergency alert information create a better community than those who have poor health and don't understand where to get proper treatment and medicine."

The Problem, Identification, and Prioritization cycle have three phases that help benefit the community, which is forming a health coalition, collecting and analyzing data for health profile, and identifying critical health issues. The information that is gathered is also distributed to the community to help with important decision-making.

The Analysis and Implementation cycle which helps resolve community health problems by analyzing the health issue, establishing resources, creating a health improvement strategy with the resources, and allocating responsibility throughout the community. Multiple issues are analyzed in conjunction to determine which is most important. Lastly, the authority to act is implemented, sufficient funds are allocated and access to data is released in order for the members of the community to review and move accordingly.

== Community health in the Global South ==
Access to community health in the Global South is influenced by geographic accessibility (physical distance from the service delivery point to the user), availability (proper type of care, service provider, and materials), financial accessibility (willingness and ability of users to purchase services), and acceptability (responsiveness of providers to social and cultural norms of users and their communities). While the Epidemiological transition is shifting the disease burden from communicable to noncommunicable conditions in developing countries, this transition is still in an early stage in parts of the Global South such as South Asia, the Middle East, and Sub-Saharan Africa. Two phenomena in developing countries have created a "medical poverty trap" for underserved communities in the Global South — the introduction of user fees for public healthcare services and the growth of out-of-pocket expenses for private services. The private healthcare sector is being increasingly utilized by low and middle income communities in the Global South for conditions such as malaria, tuberculosis, and sexually transmitted infections. Private care is characterized by more flexible access, shorter waiting times, and greater choice. Private providers that serve low-income communities are often unqualified and untrained. Some policymakers recommend that governments in developing countries harness private providers to remove state responsibility from service provision.

Community development is frequently used as a public health intervention to empower communities to obtain self-reliance and control over the factors that affect their health. Community health workers are able to draw on their firsthand experience, or local knowledge, to complement the information that scientists and policy makers use when designing health interventions. Interventions with community health workers have been shown to improve access to primary healthcare and quality of care in developing countries through reduced malnutrition rates, improved maternal and child health and prevention and management of HIV/AIDS. Community health workers have also been shown to promote chronic disease management by improving the clinical outcomes of patients with diabetes, hypertension, and cardiovascular diseases.

Slum-dwellers in the Global South face threats of infectious disease, non-communicable conditions, and injuries due to violence and road traffic accidents. Participatory, multi-objective slum upgrading in the urban sphere significantly improves social determinants that shape health outcomes such as safe housing, food access, political and gender rights, education, and employment status. Efforts have been made to involve the urban poor in project and policy design and implementation. Through slum upgrading, states recognize and acknowledge the rights of the urban poor and the need to deliver basic services. Upgrading can vary from small-scale sector-specific projects (i.e. water taps, paved roads) to comprehensive housing and infrastructure projects (i.e. piped water, sewers). Other projects combine environmental interactions with social programs and political empowerment. Recently, slum upgrading projects have been incremental to prevent the displacement of residents during improvements and attentive to emerging concerns regarding climate change adaptation. By legitimizing slum-dwellers and their right to remain, slum upgrading is an alternative to slum removal and a process that in itself may address the structural determinants of population health.

=== Kenya ===
Community health refers to the first level of health services provision in Kenya that comprises;

1. Interventions focusing on building demand for existing health and related services, by improving community awareness and health seeking behavior and 2. Taking defined interventions and services as defined in (Kenya Health Sector Strategic and investment plan KHSSP) close to the community and households.

The current registered association for community Health professionals in Kenya is The Society of Community Health Caregivers. It was registered in the year 2020 to act as an umbrella body for the community health professionals.

== Academic resources ==
- Journal of Urban Health, Springer. ISSN 1468-2869 (electronic) ISSN 1099-3460 (paper).
- International Quarterly of Community Health Education, Sage Publications. ISSN 1541-3519 (electronic), ISSN 0272-684X (paper).
- Global Public Health, Informa Healthcare. ISSN 1744-1692 (paper).
- Journal of Community Health, Springer. ISSN 1573-3610.
- Family and Community Health, Lippincott Williams & Wilkins. ISSN 0160-6379 (electronic).
- Health Promotion Practice, Sage Publications. ISSN 1552-6372 (electronic) ISSN 1524-8399 (paper).
- Journal of Health Services Research and Policy, Sage Publications. ISSN 1758-1060 (electronic) ISSN 1355-8196 (paper).
- BMC Health Sciences Research, Biomed Central. ISSN 1472-6963 (electronic).
- Health Services Research, Wiley-Blackwell. ISSN 1475-6773 (electronic).
- Health Communication and Literacy: An Annotated Bibliography, Centre for Literacy of Quebec. ISBN 0968103456.

== See also ==
- Community health agent
- Community health center
- Community mental health service
- Online health communities
- Population health
- Prison reform
- University of Community Health, Magway
