= Mary Jeanne Kreek =

American neurobiologist (1937-2021)

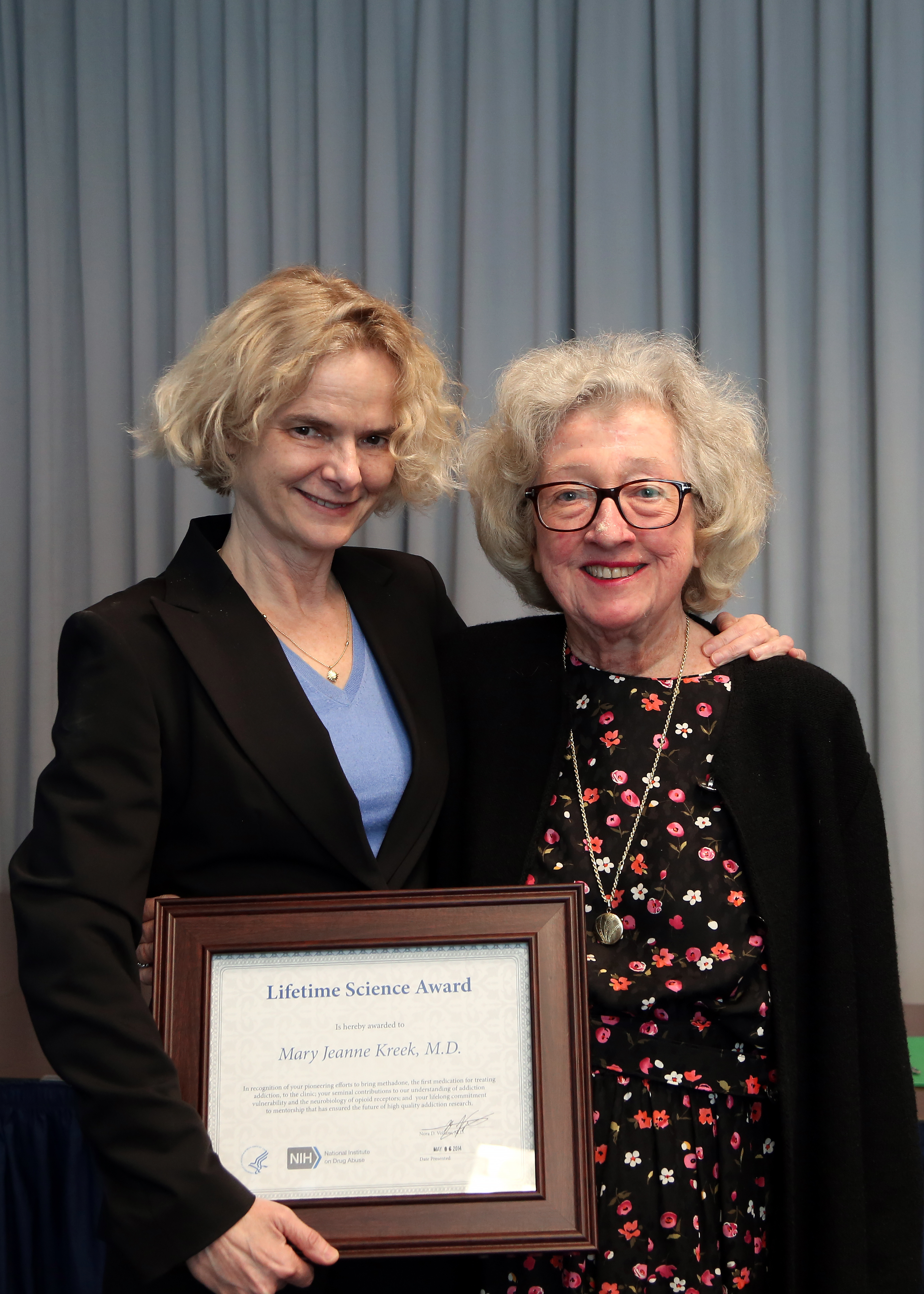
- Kreek (right), receiving Lifetime Science Award
- Born: 9 February 1937; Washington, D.C.
- Died: 27 March 2021 (aged 84)
- Education: Wellesley College; Columbia University College of Physicians and Surgeons
- Known for: Methadone therapy
- Scientific career
- Fields: Neurobiology

Mary Jeanne Kreek (9 February 1937 – March 27, 2021) was an American neurobiologist specializing in the study and treatment of addiction. She is best known for her work with Marie Nyswander and Vincent Dole in the development of methadone therapy for heroin addiction.

== Education ==
Kreek graduated with a B.A. in chemistry from Wellesley College in 1958, and in 1962, she received her M.D. from Columbia University College of Physicians and Surgeons.

== Career ==
Kreek completed a fellowship in gastroenterology at New York Hospital-Cornell Medical Center after completing her M.D. She taught medicine at the Cornell Medical College.

In 1964, during her second year of residency in internal medicine at Cornell University-New York Hospital Medical Center, Kreek worked in Vincent Dole's lab where they discovered heroin's neurochemical effects and helped develop methadone therapy for addiction.

In 2000, Kreek was named a Fellow of the New York Academy of Sciences, and in 2004, she received an Alumni Gold Medal Award from Columbia University College of Physicians and Surgeons for "lifetime excellence in medicine". In 2014, Kreek was awarded a Lifetime Achievement Award from the National Institute on Drug Abuse.

As of November 2015, she was a senior attending physician, the Patrick E. and Beatrice M. Haggerty Professor, and head of the Laboratory of the Biology of Addictive Diseases at The Rockefeller University.

Kreek served as a visiting professor for St. George's University in Grenada from 1979 to 2015, as well on the board of directors for the campus-based research institution, the Windward Islands Research and Education Foundation (WINDREF).

== Personal life ==
Her father, Louis Francis Kreek, was an Examiner-in-Chief and served on the board of the United States Patent and Trademark Office. On January 24, 1970, she married Robert A. Schaefer.

She died on March 27, 2021, at the age of 84.
