= Health Education & Behavior =

- Discipline: Public health, education
- Language: English
- Edited by: Jesus Ramirez-Valles

Publication details
- Former names: Health Education Quarterly, Health Education Monographs
- History: 1973-present
- Publisher: SAGE Publications
- Frequency: Bimonthly
- Impact factor: 4.444 (2020)

Standard abbreviations
- ISO 4: Health Educ. Behav.

Indexing
- CODEN: HEDBFS
- ISSN: 1090-1981 (print); 1552-6127 (web)
- LCCN: sn96-2571
- OCLC no.: 35233880

Links
- Journal homepage; Online access; Online archive

Health Education & Behavior is a bimonthly peer-reviewed healthcare journal covering applied behavioral and social science in public health published by SAGE Publications. It is an official journal of the Society for Public Health Education (SOPHE).

== History ==
The journal was established in 1957 as Health Education Monographs which was produced on an occasional basis with no set publishing schedule until 1974, when it became a quarterly publication with standard volume numbering and pagination. The first issue of 1974 became volume 2, issue 1. All previous issues covering issues 1 to 36, from 1957 to 1973, were designated to constitute volume 1. During this period, Health Education Monographs was printed by various small publishing companies or cooperatively by SOPHE and the World Health Organization. No volume was published in 1979 due to extensive ongoing changes, including a new publisher, editor, and format.

In 1980, the journal was renamed Health Education Quarterly and a publication agreement was negotiated with Human Sciences Press. John Wiley & Sons became the publisher with volume 10 in 1983 and the journal changed to its present publisher, SAGE Publications, in 1995. In 1997, the journal expanded to six issues annually to accommodate the growing volume of submissions and was renamed Health Education & Behavior.

== Abstracting and indexing ==
The journal is abstracted and indexed by CAB Abstracts, CINAHL, Current Contents/Social & Behavioral Sciences, Global Health, Index Medicus/MEDLINE/PubMed, ProQuest databases, Psychological Abstracts, PsycINFO, PsycLIT, SafetyLit, Scopus, Social Sciences Citation Index, and Sociological Abstracts. According to the Journal Citation Reports, the journal's 2020 2-year impact factor is 4.444.
