= Nyswander =

Nyswander may refer to:

- Dorothy Nyswander, health educator, centenarian, and mother of Marie
- Marie Nyswander, psychiatrist, expert on addiction, and daughter of Dorothy
- Detective Nyswander, a character in Burglar (film)
