= Dorothy Nyswander =

American psychologist

Dorothy Bird Nyswander
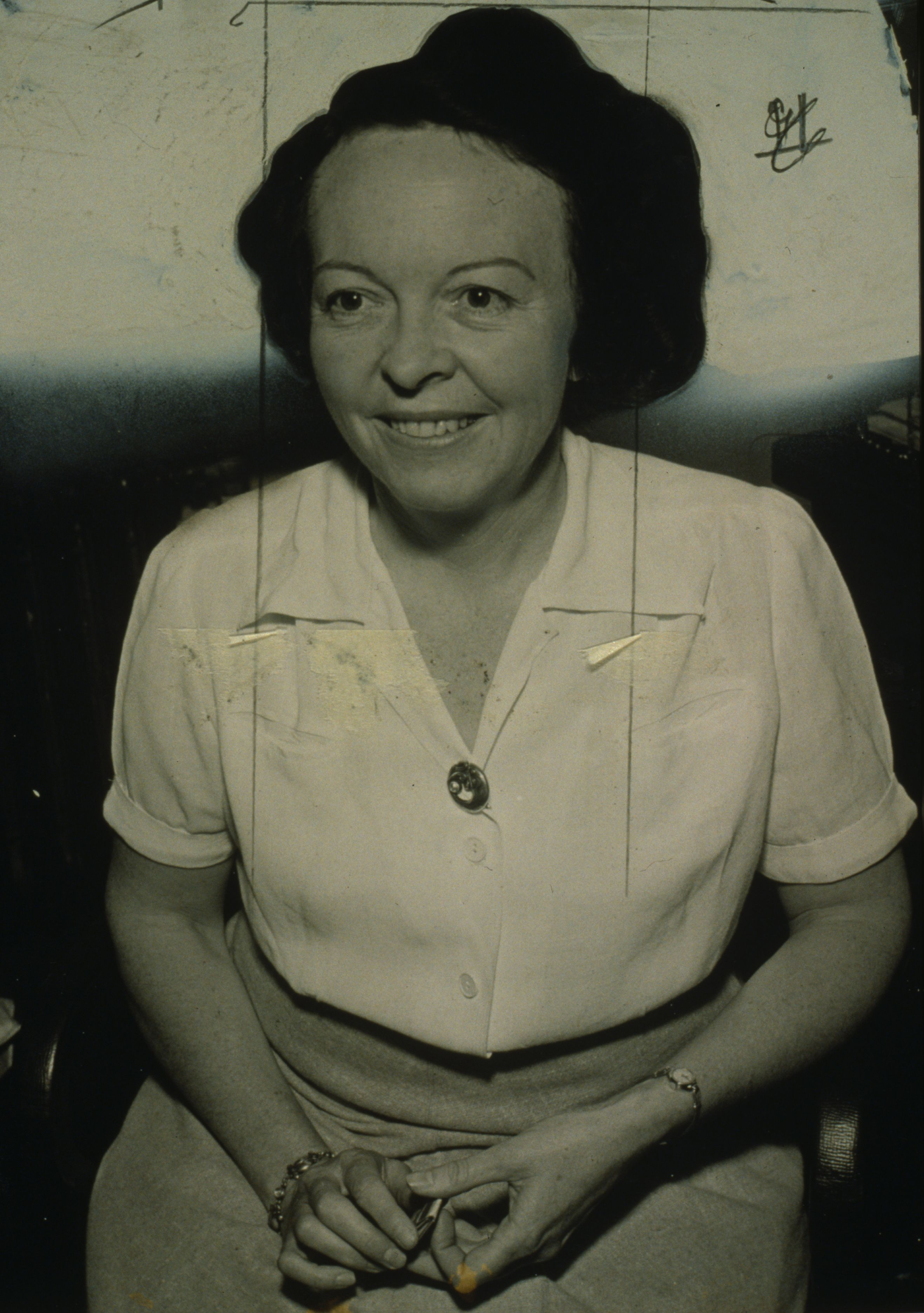
- Dorothy Nyswander (1942)
- Born: September 29, 1894
- Died: December 18, 1998 (aged 104); Berkeley, California
- Occupation: Health Educator
- Spouse(s): George Palmer; Julian Steward (1930–1932)
- Children: Marie Nyswander (Dole)

Dorothy Bird Nyswander (September 29, 1894 – December 18, 1998), was an American health educator. She graduated with masters and bachelor's degrees from the University of Nevada and a Ph.D. in Psychology from the University of California, Berkeley. She is considered the Mother of Health education.

== Professional life and vision ==
Her career spanned over six decades and several continents. During this time, Nyswander was an advocate for community health and rights. As a single mother, she taught in high school while earning her doctorate. She worked for the Works Progress Administration during the Great Depression; advocated working mothers’ child care while employed with the Federal Works Agency; and promoted preventive school health as the director of Queen’s City Health Center.

In 1943, Nyswander became instrumental in founding the Berkeley School of Public Health. In 1946 she became a full-time professor at UC Berkeley and remained there for nearly 12 years. Following her retirement, in 1957, and at age 62, Dorothy Nyswander then began a 16-year career with the World Health Organization travelling to Jamaica, Turkey, Brazil, the South Seas, and India developing health education programs. She is said to have regretted not getting into politics. However, in her words "but you don't get to do everything you want in this life".

Dr. Nyswander was committed to an "Open Society.” In 1966 she defined an open society as "one where justice is the same for every [person]; where dissent is taken seriously as an index of something wrong or something needed; where diversity is expected; . . . where the best of health care is available to all; where poverty is a community disgrace not an individual’s weakness; [and] where desires for power over [people] become satisfaction with the use of power for people”.

== SOPHE ==
In 1996, two years prior to her death, the California Chapter of the Society for Public Health Education (NC-SOPHE) began awarding the Dorothy B. Nyswander Award for Leadership in Health Education for health educators who have demonstrated the professional standards set forth by Nsywander. The first recipient was Helen Ross, former Chair of the San José State University MPH Program. Subsequent recipients include Kathleen Roe, former MPH Program Director and chair of the SJSU Health Science Department since 2002; Meredith Minkler, Professor of Health and Social Behavior at UC Berkeley, and Kate Lorig, Professor in the Stanford University Department of Medicine and Director of Patient Education Research Center. In 2005, the national Society for Public Health Education created the Open Society Award to honor Dorothy's legacy. The award is given each year to recognize an individual or group who embodies and promotes an Open Society, through research, practice, and/or teaching. The first recipient of this award was the San Jose University Department of Health Science Master of Public Health Program.

== See also ==
- Health education
- Health promotion
- Marie Nyswander, Dorothy Nyswander's daughter, known for her work developing methadone treatment for heroin addiction
