= Padian =

Padian is a surname. Notable people with the surname include:

- Kevin Padian (born 1951), American paleontologist
- Mary Padian, a buyer in the American television series Storage Wars and Storage Wars: Texas
- Nancy Padian (born 1952), American epidemiologist

== See also ==
- Lex Pedia or Pedian law, an ancient Roman law which established courts to prosecute Julius Caesar's assassins
