= Melissa Freeman =

American physician (1926–2024)

- Born: April 26, 1926; New York City, U.S.
- Died: December 9, 2024 (aged 98); New York City, U.S.
- Education: High School of Music & Art; Hunter College; Howard University College of Medicine
- Employer: Beth Israel Hospital

Melissa M. Freeman (April 26, 1926 – December 9, 2024) was an American physician based at the Beth Israel Medical Center.

== Early life and education ==
Freeman was born in The Bronx, New York on April 26, 1926. Her grandfather was born a slave in the 1850s, and was a teenager when the Emancipation Proclamation was signed. Freeman grew up in Williamsburg, Brooklyn. She attended High School of Music & Art, where she most enjoyed physiology and social work. She graduated Howard University College of Medicine in 1955, where she attended night classes and worked several day jobs. She was one of only 4 women in a class of 150 students.

== Career ==
Freeman completed an internship at Kings County Hospital Center and a residency at Nassau University Medical Center. She began practicing medicine in 1961. Working with Vincent Dole and Marie Nyswander, she developed the use of methadone to treat heroin addiction. She was one of the first doctors to treat women using methadone maintenance. She set up her own internal medicine practice in Harlem in 1981.

She worked at Beth Israel Hospital for over 50 years. She runs a methadone maintenance program in New York, and mentors young doctors.

Freeman inspired Valentin Bonilla Jr, Chief Physician Assistant at the Mount Sinai Beth Israel Opioid Treatment Program, to pursue a career in medication-assisted treatment.

== Personal life and death ==
Freeman was Catholic. She died in The Bronx on December 9, 2024, at the age of 98.
