= Mary Pittman =

Mary Pittman is the president and CEO of PHI (Public Health Institute).

== Career ==
Pittman has also served as president of the Health Research and Educational Trust/AHA and president and chief executive officer of the California Association of Public Hospitals.

== Awards and honors ==
She was named one of 2021’s Top 25 Women in Healthcare. In October 2020, UC Berkeley School of Public Health as part of their 150th anniversary celebration, named Pittman one of 16 women who changed public health. She is one of the PharmaVoice 100 in 2020.

== Early life ==
Pittman majored in cell and molecular biology at University at Buffalo and has a Dr.PH. From UC Berkeley school of Public Health. Undergraduate professors persuaded her to go into public health instead of medicine except she did not know what public health was.
