= Asmaa James =

Sierra Leone journalist and human rights activist

Asmaa James is a Sierra Leone journalist and women's rights activist. According to the BBC’s list of “100 Women” for 2019, she is one of the 100 most inspiring and influential women in the world.

== Early years and education ==
James was born in Freetown and brought up as an orphan in Pujehun. In 2016, she was selected for Mandela Washington Fellowship for Young African Leaders award, giving her the opportunity to hone her skills and develop professionally at a higher education institution in the United States.

== Career ==
She is currently the host for the “Good Morning Sierra Leone”, a human rights program on Radio Democracy 98.1. Prior to this, she worked as a radio reporter. She served as station manager of Radio Democracy (www.radiodemocracy.sl), an independent, civil-society-owned radio station. She also served as vice-president of the Sierra Leone Reporters Union, and president of Women in the Media Sierra Leone (WIMSAL), an organization supporting the advancement of women in the media, and providing protection and capacity building for its membership.

James founded the Asmaa James Foundation, during the aftermath of the Ebola epidemic. Her foundation provides support to girls from disadvantaged backgrounds by giving them access to reproductive health education, scholarships, mentoring, and life skills training. In December 2018, she initiated the Black Tuesday campaign to protest against the rise of rape and abuse of girls under 12. This campaign encouraged women to wear black on the last Tuesday of every month. The campaign influenced the sitting president to declare a state of emergency on rape and reform policies surrounding sexual violence.

== Awards and recognitions ==
- 2014 - James was recognised as the most outstanding female journalist in Sierra Leone by the Independent Media Commission.
- 2016 - Mandela Washington Fellow
- 2019 - Recognised as one of the 100 BBC Women
