= Flint Adolescent Study =

The Flint Adolescent Study (FAS) is a longitudinal interview study of risk and promotive factors associated with alcohol, tobacco and other drug use across a lifetime.

The study is led by Marc A. Zimmerman, director of the Prevention Research Center and the Michigan Youth Violence Prevention Center at the University of Michigan School of Public Health (UMSPH). The project director is Hsing-Fang Hsieh, research investigator at the UMSPH. Data is collected by the Michigan Public Health Institute.

The Flint Adolescent Study and Flint Adolescent Study-Generation 2 are funded by the National Institute on Drug Abuse.

== FAS Generation 1 ==
In 1994, a cohort of 850 youth was recruited from the Flint Community Schools. A sample of predominantly African American youth was followed for four years in high school (1994-1998), four years after high school as they experienced the transition to young adulthood (1999-2003), and another four years during their late twenties as they experienced middle adult transition (2008-2012).

The original goal of the study was to explore the promotive factors associated with school dropout and alcohol, tobacco, and other drug (ATOD) use across their four high school years. Over the years, additional risk and promotive factors and health outcomes were explored including:

- participation in church, school and community organizations
- social support and influence of family and friends (including mentoring)
- self-esteem, stress and psychological well-being
- delinquent and violent behaviors; alcohol and substance abuse
- sex behaviors and child-bearing
- school attitudes and performance
- family structure and relationships
- driving behavior (beginning in Years 3 & 4)
- racial identity (beginning in Year 3)
- marriage, parenting, and post-secondary education (beginning in Year 5)

== FAS Generation 2 ==
Now in their 30s, the original FAS participants are parents to over 400 children aged 5–16 years old. The "Flint Adolescent Study – Generation 2" expands on the scope of the original study to explore how parenting factors are associated with children's alcohol and drug use and other risk factors.

The specific aim of FAS Gen 2 is to understand the inter-generational transmission of risk for ATOD use from the original FAS sample. Applying a socio-ecological developmental framework with a resiliency perspective, family, neighborhood environments, and past and current behaviors are being studied, along with the attitudes and experiences of parents and how they influence their parenting attitudes and behaviors over time. The study is also examining how these factors may influence substance use in their children (G2).

The specific aims are FAS Gen 2 are:

- To examine how individual and family factors measured across adolescence and young adulthood predict G1's parenting attitudes and behaviors.
- To identify which G1 parenting attitudes and behaviors predict G2 ATOD use antecedents (both risk and promotive factors) and subsequent ATOD use (or nonuse).
- To test a social ecological model that incorporates the findings from Aims 1-2 into a comprehensive model testing both longitudinal influences and structural paths.
- To determine the extent to which Aims 1-2 are influenced by neighborhood characteristics.
