= Meredith Minkler =

American health researcher (born 1946)

Meredith Ann Minkler
- Born: September 23, 1946 (age 79)
- Education: University of California, Berkeley
- Scientific career
- Workplaces: University of California, Berkeley
- Thesis: Role conflict and role shock : American and Indian perspectives on the role of U.S. family planning advisors in India (1975)

Meredith Minkler (born September 23, 1946) is an American public health researcher who is emeritus Professor at the University of California, Berkeley. She is known for her work on community-based participatory research and its use in public policy, criminal justice reform and democratizing access to food.

== Early life and education ==
Minkler was born in San Francisco. Her mother worked in medical records and her father was in education. She was an undergraduate student at the University of California, Berkeley, where she majored in social sciences. She remained at the University of California, Berkeley for doctoral studies, where she investigated American and Indian perspectives on the role of United States' family planning advisors working in India.

== Research and career ==
Whilst Professor of Health and Social Behavior, Minkler oversaw the graduate program in public health, and founded the university's Center on Ageing. She worked on the development of community-based participatory research programs, particularly to study and address health equity and social justice. Minkler works with low-income young and old people, women of color and people who were formerly incarcerated.

Minkler was selected by the University of California, Berkeley as one of their most pioneering public health researchers. She was selected by the School of Public Health as one of their Women Changemakers.

== Selected publications ==
- Meredith Minkler (11 May 2005). "Community-based research partnerships: challenges and opportunities". Journal of Urban Health. 82 (2 Suppl 2): ii3-12. doi:10.1093/jurban/jti034. ISSN 1099-3460. PMC 3456439. PMID 15888635. Wikidata Q36124412.
- Caricia Catalani; Meredith Minkler (1 October 2009). "Photovoice: a review of the literature in health and public health". Health Education & Behavior. 37 (3): 424–451. doi:10.1177/1090198109342084. ISSN 1090-1981. PMID 19797541. Wikidata Q37606936.
- Meredith Minkler (1 December 2004). "Ethical challenges for the "outside" researcher in community-based participatory research". Health Education & Behavior. 31 (6): 684–697. doi:10.1177/1090198104269566. ISSN 1090-1981. PMID 15539542. Wikidata Q35946455.

=== Books ===
- Community-based participatory research for health : from process to outcomes. Meredith Minkler, Nina Wallerstein (2 ed.). San Francisco, CA: Jossey-Bass. 2008. ISBN 978-0-470-93249-0. OCLC 680623202.
- Community organizing and community building for health. Meredith Minkler (2 ed.). New Brunswick, N.J.: Rutgers University Press. 2005. ISBN 0-8135-3473-9. OCLC 54029511.
- Wallerstein, Nina; Duran, Bonnie; Oetzel, John G.; Minkler, Meredith (2018). Community-based participatory research for health : advancing social and health equity (3 ed.). San Francisco, CA. ISBN 978-1-119-25885-8. OCLC 979565164.
- Minkler, Meredith (1993). Grandmothers as caregivers : raising children of the crack cocaine epidemic. Kathleen M. Roe. Newbury Park, Calif.: Sage. ISBN 0-8039-4846-8. OCLC 27034827.
