= Emma Bowen =

Emma Bowen may refer to:

- Emma L. Bowen (died 1996), American community activist in community health care and fair media
- Emma Lucy Gates Bowen (1882–1951), American opera singer
