= Journal of Community Health =

- Discipline: Community health
- Language: English
- Edited by: Imperato Pascal

Publication details
- History: 1975-present
- Publisher: Springer Science+Business Media
- Frequency: Bimonthly
- Impact factor: 5.9 (2022)

Standard abbreviations
- ISO 4: J. Community Health

Indexing
- ISSN: 0094-5145 (print); 1573-3610 (web)
- OCLC no.: 2244911

Links
- Journal homepage; Online archive

The Journal of Community Health is a peer-reviewed public health journal covering community health which appears every two months. It was established in 1975 as a quarterly journal with Robert L. Kane as the founding editor-in-chief, and the current one is Pascal Imperato (SUNY Downstate Medical Center). According to the Journal Citation Reports, the journal has a 2017 impact factor of 1.530.
