= PsycLIT =

CD-ROM database

PsycINFO
- Producer: American Psychological Association (United States)
- History: 1986–2000

Access
- Providers: APA PsycNET
- Cost: subscription

Coverage
- Disciplines: Psychology
- Record depth: Index & abstract
- Format coverage: Books
- Geospatial coverage: Worldwide

Print edition
- ISSN: 1075-3060

PsycLIT was a CD-ROM version of Psychological Abstracts. It was merged into the PsycINFO online database in 2000. PsycLIT contained citations and abstracts to journal articles, and summaries of English-language chapters and books in psychology, as well as behavioral information from sociology, linguistics, medicine, law, psychiatry, and anthropology.

It was one of a number of databases indexing psychological research papers and journals. Others included PsycINFO, Psychological Abstracts, Ulrich International Periodical Directory, PUBLIST (The Internet Directory Publications), ISSN International, PSICODOC, the ISOC database PSEDISOC, CSIC-RISO, CIRBIC-REVISTAS, COMPLUDOC Social Sciences Citation Index and the Institute for Scientific Information (Thomson-ISI).
