= Gordon Belcourt =

American lawyer

Gordon Belcourt, or Meekskimeeksskumapi, (1945 – July 15, 2013) was an American Blackfeet and Native American tribal executive and social advocate. A member of the Blackfeet Tribe, Belcourt served as the executive director of the Montana-Wyoming Tribal Leaders Council for fifteen years, from 1998 until his death in 2013.

Belcourt was born in 1945 and raised on the Blackfeet Indian Reservation of Montana. He was also named Meekskimeeksskumapi, which means "Mixed Iron Boy" in the Blackfoot language in honor of the battles that his uncle, Paul Home Gun Jr., had been involved in during the five years of World War II. His uncle had returned from the war shortly before Belcourt's birth.

Belcourt was valedictorian of his graduating class at Browning High School, but initially resisted attending college. His principal at Browning High School informed him that he would be going to college. He was accepted to Santa Clara University, a Jesuit school in California, on a full ROTC scholarship. Belcourt achieved the rank of second lieutenant in the United States Army through the Santa Clara ROTC program. He earned his bachelor's degree from Santa Clara and began to pursue a law degree from the University of Montana. He met his wife, Cheryl, while attending Montana. Belcourt moved back to California after law school, where he earned a master's degree in public health from the University of California, Berkeley. He then returned to Montana, where resided on the Blackfeet Indian Reservation and in Missoula before settling in Billings, Montana. He served as the President of the Blackfeet Community College.

He served as the Executive Director of the Montana-Wyoming Tribal Leaders Council from 1998 to 2013. He has been widely credited with increasing the influence of the council. The Council, which was near bankruptcy in 1998, had just one employee when he began his tenure. Belcourt expanded the Council through development and grant writing. Under Belcourt, the Council acquired $5 million in funding in 2009 in combat alcohol abuse in Native American communities in Montana and Wyoming. Both of Montana's present United States Senators, Max Baucus and Jon Tester, sought Belcourt's advice on issues relevant to Native Americans, including the authorization of the Indian Healthcare Improvement Act and the creation of the Tribal Law and Order Act of 2010. In February 2013, called public attention to the high suicide rates in Native American communities.

Belcourt was also instrumental in the establishment of a regional branch of the Tribal Institutional Review Board.

The University of California, Berkeley School of Public Health honored Belcourt as one of its Public Health Heroes in 2003 for his work on Native American health care issues. In 2007, he was awarded an honorary doctorate from the University of Montana.

Gordon Belcourt died of a long illness at St. Vincent Healthcare in Billings, Montana, at 7 a.m. on July 15, 2013, at the age of 68. He was survived by his wife of 43 years, Cheryl, and seven of their eight children - Sol, Paul Thunder, Annjeanette Elise, Jaime Ruth, Ben David, Alex Anson and Sienna Noel. His eighth daughter, Elena Katie, was murdered in 2001, which increased his determination to fight violence and crime.

U.S. Senator Max Baucus called Belcourt a "wise and trusted leader," while Senator Jon Tester also praised him noting, "Gordon could always be counted on to use common sense to get to the heart of the issue and find a solution" whose death leaves "big shoes to fill."
