= Bonnie Duran =

American public health researcher

Bonnie Marie Duran
- Education: University of California, Berkeley; San Francisco State University
- Scientific career
- Workplaces: University of Washington; University of New Mexico
- Thesis: The struggles and outcomes of colonial and indigenous discourse about Indians and alcohol : a historic and contemporary analysis (1997)

Bonnie Duran is an American public health researcher and Professor in the Schools of Social Work and Public Health. Duran studies the public health of indigenous communities, and has partnered with the Navajo Nation, Indian Health Service and National Congress of American Indians.

== Early life and education ==
Duran is of Appalousa and Coushatta descent. She was an undergraduate student at San Francisco State University, where she studied health education. She completed a Master of Public Health at the University of California, Berkeley. She remained at the University of California, Berkeley for her graduate studies, where she studied the public health of indigenous communities.

== Research and career ==
After earning her doctorate Duran joined the University of New Mexico, where she led the Centre for Native American Health. Duran joined the University of Washington in 2007, where she was made associate professor in 2014 and full professor in 2017. She serves as Director of the Center for Indigenous Health Research. Her research considers issues that impact the health of Native Americans and other minority communities in the United States. She has studied the prevalence of mental disorders and the treatment of indigenous women who use Indian Health Service primary career facilities.

In 2018 Duran was selected by the University of California, Berkeley as part of their most influential alumni.

== Awards and honours ==
- 2024 American Association for the Advancement of Science Fellowship Award
- 2009 American Public Health Association Tom Bruce Award
- 2013 Centers for Disease Control and Prevention “Health Equity Champion
- 2016 American Psychological Association Psychologists in Public Service Wayfinder Award
- 2018 University of California, Berkeley Most Influential Alumni

== Select publications ==
- Nina B Wallerstein; Bonnie Duran (7 June 2006). "Using community-based participatory research to address health disparities". Health Promotion Practice. 7 (3): 312–323. doi:10.1177/1524839906289376. ISSN 1524-8399. PMID 16760238. Wikidata Q47202069.
- Nina Wallerstein; Bonnie Duran (10 February 2010). "Community-based participatory research contributions to intervention research: the intersection of science and practice to improve health equity". American Journal of Public Health. 100 Suppl 1: S40-6. doi:10.2105/ajph.2009.184036. ISSN 1541-0048. PMC 2837458. PMID 20147663. Wikidata Q82859644.
- Eduardo Duran; Bonnie Duran; Maria Yellow Horse Brave Heart; Susan Yellow Horse-Davis (1998), Healing the American Indian Soul Wound, pp. 341–354, doi:10.1007/978-1-4757-5567-1_22, Wikidata Q57546843

=== Books ===
- Duran, Eduardo; Duran, Bonnie (1995). Native American postcolonial psychology. Bonnie Duran. Albany. ISBN 0-7914-2353-0. OCLC 30111708.

== Personal life ==
Duran is a Buddhist mindfulness practitioner. She is part of the Spirit Rock Meditation Center, and teaches on their council.
