= Carol D'Onofrio =

American public health researcher (1936–2020)

Carol Ann Neisess D'Onofrio
- Born: February 24, 1936
- Died: April 14, 2020 (aged 83)
- Education: University of California, Berkeley
- Scientific career
- Workplaces: University of California, Berkeley, School of Public Health
- Thesis: Motivational and promotional factors associated with the acceptance of a contraceptive method in the postpartum period (1973)

Carol D'Onofrio (February 24, 1936 – April 14, 2020) was an American public health researcher who was Emeritus Professor at the University of California, Berkeley, School of Public Health. Her career focused on improving the health of underserved communities, in particular through curtailing the use of tobacco and alcohol.

== Early life and education ==
D'Onofrio was born in Conrad, Montana. She grew up in Enterprise, Oregon and was a high school student at Walla Walla, Washington. D'Onofrio completed her undergraduate studies at the University of Washington. She majored in English and education, and was named as one of the university's most outstanding women. After spending a year in Chile as a Rotary International Fellow, D'Onofrio moved to East Los Angeles where she worked for the Los Angeles County Department of Public Health. She joined the University of California, Berkeley for graduate studies, where she worked toward a master's then doctorate in public health. She was one of the first students of the UC Berkeley public health program. Her research considered the motivational factors that are associated with the acceptance of contraception postpartum.

== Research and career ==
D'Onofrio was appointed a tenured Professor in 1973. She concentrated on “reaching the hard-to-reach”. D'Onofrio dedicated her career to the creation and assessment of public health programs for people from marginalized communities. She studied dependencies on tobacco and alcohol, the availability of breast and cervical cancer screening and the improvement of access to palliative care.

D'Onofrio led the United States' first randomized controlled trial on preventing young people from smoking or chewing tobacco. The study involved young people from 38 counties in California. Together with Joan Bloom, D'Onofrio studied breast cancer in young women, and found that women with disabilities were largely ignored from local breast screening initiatives. This observation motivated D'Onofrio to launch Breast Health Access for Women with Disabilities, an initiative that became a national model.

Working with Rosalind Singer, D'Onofrio called out school textbook authors for featuring sugary snacks as rewards for good behavior. She found that cake accounted for one in every twelve food appearances.

== Academic service ==
D'Onofrio served on the advisory board of the Ethnic Health Institute, with whom she worked on health promotion campaigns that looked to address ethnic disparities. At UC Berkeley, she served on the Academic Senate, Committee on Educational Policy, Committee on the Status of Women and Ethnic Minorities and the Division vice chair and as a member of the Committee for Academic Planning and Resource Allocation.

== Awards and honors ==
- University of California, Berkeley, School of Public Health, Alumna of the Year Award 2009
- Fellow of the National Society for Public Health Education
- Alta Bates Summit Medical Center Heroes in Healthcare Lifetime Achievement Award
- School of Public Health's Most Outstanding alumna

== Selected publications ==
- D'Onofrio, Carol Ann Neisess (1973). Motivational and promotional factors associated with the acceptance of a contraceptive method in the postpartum period. University of California, Berkeley. OCLC 80968951. (thesis)
- D'Onofrio, Carol Ann Neisess; Rich, Ruth (1993). Discover, decisions for health. San Diego, CA: Educational Assessment Pub. OCLC 1033652639.
- R J Pasick; Susan L. Stewart; J A Bird; C N D'Onofrio (1 January 2001). "Quality of data in multiethnic health surveys". Public Health Reports. 116 Suppl 1: 223–243. doi:10.1093/phr/116.s1.223. ISSN 0033-3549. PMC 1913670. PMID 11889288. Wikidata Q30678887.
- Bruce Jennings; True Ryndes; Carol D'Onofrio; Mary Ann Baily (1 March 2003). "Access to hospice care. Expanding boundaries, overcoming barriers". Hastings Center Report. Suppl: S3-7, S9-13, S15-21 passim. ISSN 0093-0334. PMID 12762184. Wikidata Q73426942.
- Carol D'Onofrio; True Ryndes (1 March 2003). "The relevance of public health in improving access to end of life care". Hastings Center Report. Suppl: S30-2. ISSN 0093-0334. PMID 12762190. Wikidata Q46005078.
- Pat Fobair; Susan L. Stewart; Subo Chang; Carol D'Onofrio; Priscilla J Banks; Joan R Bloom (1 July 2006). "Body image and sexual problems in young women with breast cancer". Psycho-Oncology. 15 (7): 579–594. doi:10.1002/pon.991. ISSN 1057-9249. PMID 16287197. Wikidata Q51924174.

== Personal life ==
D'Onofrio had cancer and died in April 2020. She had two children and four grandchildren.
