= UC Berkeley School of Public Health =

School of the University of California, Berkeley

University of California, Berkeley School of Public Health
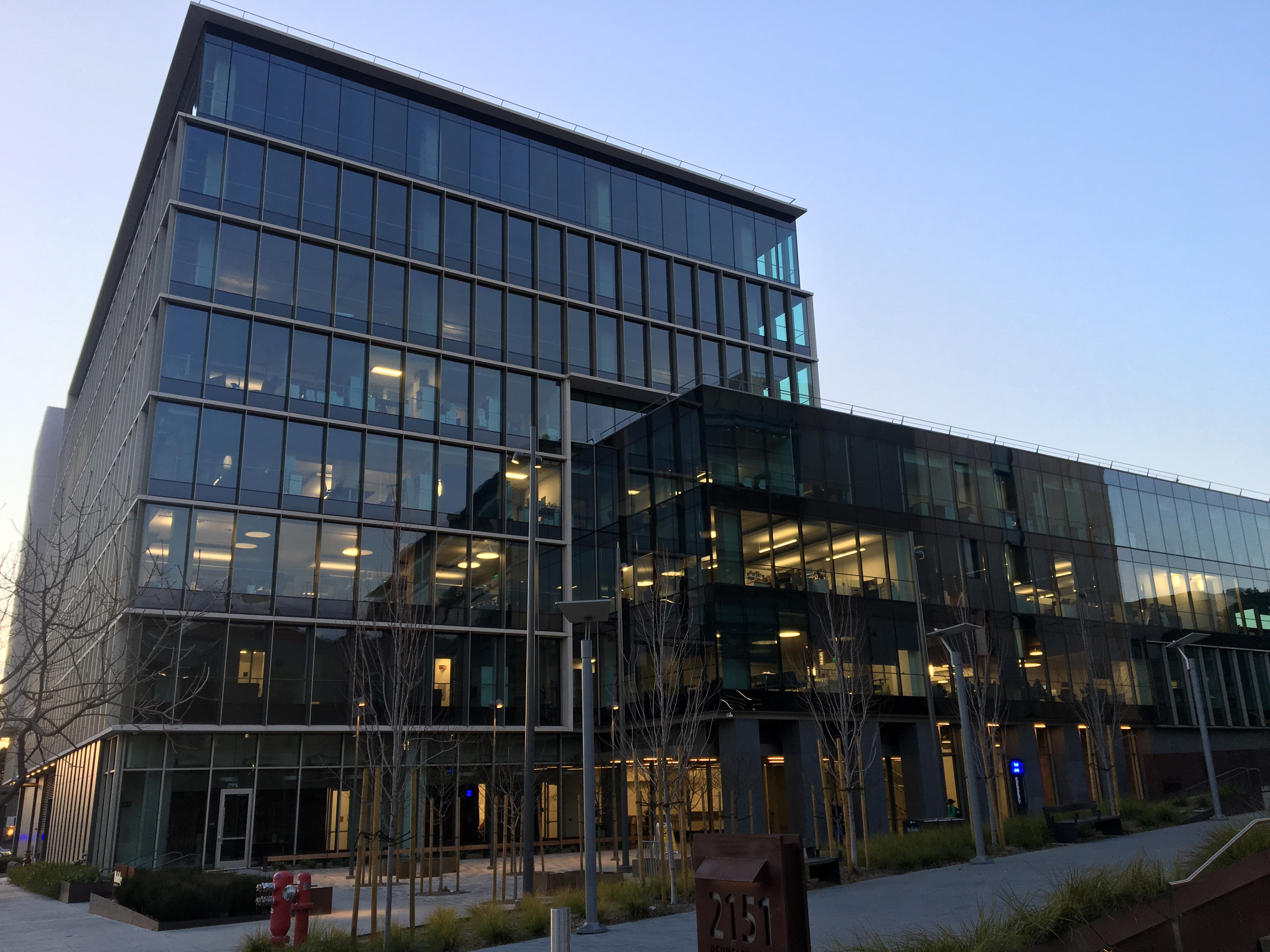
- Berkeley Way West, home of the School of Public Health
- Other names: Berkeley Public Health; School of Public Health
- Type: Public
- Established: 1943
- Parent institution: University of California, Berkeley
- Dean: Michael C. Lu
- Location: 2121 Berkeley Way, Berkeley, California, United States; 37.873649°N 122.267964°W
- Website: publichealth.berkeley.edu

The University of California, Berkeley School of Public Health is one of fourteen schools and colleges at the University of California, Berkeley. The school is currently accredited by the Council on Education for Public Health.

== History ==
The School of Public Health has its origins in the Department of Hygiene, which pioneered much of California's start of the 20th century public health endeavors. It was Karl F. Meyer, however, whose compelling 1930s Public Health curriculum demonstrated a pressing need for a school devoted to the study and practice of public health. Local professional leaders, including Lawrence Arnstein, Ford Rigby, and William Sheppard, used the momentum set in motion by this curriculum to successfully appeal the California State Legislature to create such a school. The result was AB515, signed into law by Governor Earl Warren in 1943, which appropriated funds for a school of public health at the University of California. Shortly thereafter, in 1944, the UC Berkeley School of Public Health held its first commencement. It was accredited by the American Public Health Association two years later, becoming the only accredited school of public health west of the Mississippi River.

In 1955, the school was relocated to be closer to the state health department; Earl Warren Hall was dedicated by Clark Kerr as the new home of the School of Public Health. The baccalaureate degree program continued, but the school began to devote much of its resources to graduate training. At this point, graduate enrollment hovered near 100 students. It soon trebled to 335 students in the mid-1960s, with an annual conferment of around 150 degrees.

Key laboratories in the School of Public Health during the middle of the century were the Naval Biological Laboratory, which focused primarily on aerobiology and related microbial research, and the Sanitary Engineering Research Laboratory which, maintained with the UC Berkeley College of Engineering, pioneered inquiry in the Environmental Health Sciences. The school also played a direct role in community health for years, working with the unified school district, Visiting Nurse Association, and city to provide health services to the Berkeley community through the Berkeley Unified Health Plan.

== Academics ==
=== Degrees awarded ===
Once enrolled at the School of Public Health, students may seek education in one of six concentrations: Biostatistics, Community Health Sciences, Environmental Health Sciences, Epidemiology, Health Policy & Management, and Infections Diseases & Vaccinology. The school also offers an online Master of Public Health, an undergraduate program, and concurrent degrees in business, city planning, journalism, public policy, and social welfare.

In 2021, the school graduated 539 students. Among those graduated, 231 received a Master of Public Health (MPH), 12 received a Master of Arts (MA), 24 received a Master of Science (MS), and 208 received Bachelor of Arts (BA). The university also awarded 26 MPH degrees to joint candidates, including 15 Master of Business Administration (MBA) students, 3 Master of City Planning (MCP) students, 3 Master of Public Policy (MPP) students, 3 Master of Social Welfare (MSW) students, 1 Master of City and Regional Planning (MCRP) student, and 1 Master of Journalism (MJ). Berkeley also offers a number of joint MD/MPH programs with the Stanford University School of Medicine and UCSF.

=== Rankings ===
U.S. News & World Report ranked UC Berkeley's Master of Public Health program 10th in the nation in 2024.

== Notable alumni ==
- Tomas Aragon, Director of the California Department of Public Health
- Gordon Belcourt, former executive director of the Montana-Wyoming Tribal Leaders Council, named a Public Health Hero by the Berkeley School of Public Health in 2003.
- Susan Desmond-Hellmann, Chancellor of the University of California, San Francisco (UCSF) and incoming chief executive officer of the Bill & Melinda Gates Foundation.
- Carol D'Onofrio (1936-2020), emeritus professor and alumna of the year 2009.
- Julie Gerberding, director of the Centers for Disease Control and Prevention from 2002 to 2009
- Jane Garcia CEO of La Clinica de La Raza
- Judith Heumann, American disability rights activist
- Kenneth P. Moritsugu, US Surgeon General under George W. Bush in 2002 and from 2006 to 2007
- Jerome Adams, US Surgeon General under Donald Trump from 2017 to 2021 and Health Commissioner of Indiana from 2014 to 2017
- Sir Michael Marmot, pioneer in research on health inequalities and Professor of Epidemiology and Public Health at University College London
- Meredith Minkler, Emeritus Professor of Public Health
- Marion Nestle, internationally recognized nutrition expert and author, founder of Food Studies Program at New York University
- Paul V. Nolan, Tennessee General Assembly, 1969-1970
- Kirk R. Smith, leading expert on the health and climate effects of indoor air pollution in developing countries, 2012 Tyler Laureate, contributor to the 2007 Nobel Peace Prize, member of the National Academy of Sciences. Smith died in 2021
- Herminia Palacio, former Deputy Mayor of New York City and CEO of Guttmacher Institute
- Nancy Padian, medical researcher on HIV transmission and former executive director of the Women's Global Health Imperative

== See also ==
- Public Health
- UC Berkeley-UCSF Joint Medical Program
- Health Initiative of the Americas
