= David Vlahov =

American epidemiologist

- Born: August 31, 1952 (age 73); Washington, D.C.
- Citizenship: American
- Education: Earlham College (B.A, 1974); University of Maryland (B.S.N.,1977); University of Maryland (M.S., 1980); Johns Hopkins School of Public Health and Hygiene (Ph.D.,1988)

David Vlahov (born August 31, 1952) is an American epidemiologist and professor of nursing at the Yale School of Nursing, Professor of Epidemiology- Microbial Diseases at the Yale School of Public Health and former Dean and Professor at the UCSF School of Nursing. He was also the editor-in-chief of the Journal of Urban Health. In addition, Vlahov has been a member of the National Academy of Medicine since 2011 and appointed as a member of the Interacademy Panel on Urban Health and Wellness. He is known for researching issues related tourban health, infectious diseases, substance use, mental health, community-based participatory research, and social determinants of health, notably work on the effectiveness of needle exchange programs. With Sandro Galea, he has also researched psychological responses to the September 11 attacks among residents of New York City.

Vlahov has edited four books and published over 700 papers with an h-index of 152.

== Early life and education ==
Vlahov was born and raised in Washington, D.C. He is the son of William Vlahov, a Queens-born dentist, and Helga Wolfsohn, a Jewish woman who grew up in Hamburg, Germany and fled the country for England on Kristallnacht. He received his B.A. from Earlham College in 1974, his B.S.N. from the University of Maryland in 1977, his M.S. from the University of Maryland in 1980, and his Ph.D. from the Johns Hopkins School of Public Health and Hygiene in 1988.

== Career ==
In 1988, Vlahov was appointed assistant professor of Epidemiology and by 1996 he was promoted to Professor at the Johns Hopkins School of Hygiene and Public Health. During this time he was Principal Investigator of the National Institute on Drug Abuse funded ALIVE Study for the first 17 years, which recruited 2,920 persons who injected drugs to be followed semiannually to study the natural and then treated history of HIV infection. For this work, Vlahov received an NIH MERIT Award. His work on HIV prevention included developing the empirical foundation for supporting needle exchange programs that led to policy change.

Soon after graduating from the University of Maryland, he worked as a nurse in a coronary unit at Baltimore's Sinai Hospital, and as a clinician in a prison hospital. He later became Director of the Center for Urban Epidemiologic Studies at the New York Academy of Medicine, where he helped build the center's work on subjects such as HIV prevention and mental health. While working at the New York Academy of Medicine, he also conducted a study of psychological reactions to the September 11 attacks. Before joining UCSF in 2011, he also served as a professor of clinical epidemiology at the Joseph L. Mailman School of Public Health, and the senior vice president for research at the New York Academy of Medicine.

== Personal life ==
Vlahov is married to Robyn Gershon, with whom he has two adult children.
