= Health Promotion Practice =

- Discipline: Public health
- Language: English
- Edited by: Kathleen Roe

Publication details
- History: 2000-present
- Publisher: SAGE Publications
- Frequency: Bimonthly

Standard abbreviations
- ISO 4: Health Promot. Pract.

Indexing
- ISSN: 1524-8399
- LCCN: 99008562
- OCLC no.: 300289821

Links
- Journal homepage; Online access; Online archive

Health Promotion Practice is a bimonthly peer-reviewed public health journal covering the field of public health, especially the practical application of health promotion and education. The editor-in-chief is Kathleen Roe (San Jose State University). It was established in 2000 and is published by SAGE Publications on behalf of the Society for Public Health Education.

== Abstracting and indexing ==
The journal is abstracted and indexed in:

- CINAHL
- Index Medicus/MEDLINE/PubMed
- PsycINFO
