= Jane Garcia =

Jane Garcia is the CEO of La Clinica de La Raza in Oakland, California and has been since 1982. She began as a student intern in 1978.

== Early life ==
Of Mexican heritage, Garcia grew up in El Paso, Texas.

Garcia earned her undergraduate from Yale University and MPH from the UC Berkeley School of Public Health in 1980.

== Career ==
California Governor Pete Wilson advocated for Proposition 187 to deny public health care to illegal immigrants as well as education. The proposition passed in 1994 but was never implemented because a federal court ruled it unconstitutional. In 1997, Garcia took the Wilson administration to court when they wanted to defund Medi-Cal coverage for pregnant women who were illegal immigrants. On behalf of documented immigrants, Garcia took the case to court and won.

La Clínica de la Raza took the Trump Administration to court over their “public charge” regulation. The case was filed in the United States District Court for the Northern District Court of California on August 16, 2019 and several others joined as plaintiffs. They sought a nationwide injunction to prevent the rules and regulations from being implemented. That was on September 14, 2019. On October 11, a judge denied the motion but granted preliminary injunctions in two related cases. As a result, the Trump administration was enjoined “from implementing and enforcing the Rule in California, Oregon, the District of Columbia, Maine, and Pennsylvania. 408 F. Supp. 3d 1057.” The case continued in the courts and on March 9, 2021, the Department for Homeland Security (DHS) officially abandoned the rule. The Public Charge Final Rule was abandoned and vacated nationwide as of April 15, 2021.

== Awards and honors ==
In October 2020, UC Berkeley School of Public Health, as part of their 150th-anniversary celebration, named Garcia one of 16 women who changed public health. She was chosen for being a “Trailblazer for Culturally Appropriate Clinical Care.”

Garcia has also been awarded the YMCA Martin Luther King, Jr., Leadership Prize for Human Dignity and Brotherhood, the San Francisco Foundation’s Community Leadership Award, and the 2019 Alumna of the Year Award from Berkeley Public Health.

Garcia was inducted into the Alameda County Hall of Fame in 2008.

== Publications ==
- Zahn, D., Hirota, S., Garcia, J., & Ro, M. J. (2003). Valuing Families and Meeting Them Where They Are. American Journal of Public Health, 93(11), 1797. https://doi.org/10.2105/ajph.93.11.1797
