= Emma L. Bowen =

American community activist

- Born: September 30, 1914; Spartanburg, S.C.
- Died: 14 June 1996 (aged 79); Washington Heights, Manhattan, New York City, U.S.
- Education: Fordham University, New York City
- Spouse: Marion Bowen (d. 1943)
- Website: https://www.emmabowenfoundation.org/

Emma L. Bowen was a community activist in community health care and fair media. She was an advocate for the disenfranchised and vulnerable. She was one of the co-founders of Black Citizens For Fair Media (BCFM).

== The Emma L. Bowen Community Service Center ==
As a mental health professional and community activist, Mrs. Bowen co-established the Upper Manhattan Mental Health Center, Inc. with William F. Hatcher, in 1986. When the Center opened its doors, it quickly became Harlem's largest community-based mental health facility, committed to recognizing the dignity and humanity of those who struggle with mental health issues.

With a staff of highly trained, culturally experienced psychologists, social workers, nurses, chemical dependency counselors, case managers, vocational rehabilitation counselors and early childhood teachers, the Center services include a therapeutic preschool for children with behavioral and developmental issues, programs for adults and seniors with mental health and substance abuse issues, chemical abuse outpatient programs and mental health-based services for children, adolescents and their families, as well as a twenty-bed residential chemical abuse recovery facility and a food pantry program.

Upon Mrs. Bowen's passing in 1996, the center was renamed The Emma L. Bowen Community Service Center.

Today, the Bowen Center serves over 15,000 clients annually, providing a broad range of supportive and behavioral health services to individuals and families throughout the City of New York.

== Early life ==
Emma was born and raised in Spartanburg, South Carolina. She moved to New York City during the Depression to live with her aunt. She earned her bachelor's degree in 1974, from Fordham University's Lincoln Center campus.

Emma also served as a Youth Leader in the NAACP, and one of the highlights was introducing the youth to Malcolm X.

== Career ==
She was appointed Executive Secretary to the New York City Department of Mental Health, Mental Retardation and Alcoholism Services, when John Lindsay was elected Mayor of New York City. At that time she was a Republican District Leader and Lindsay, a Republican, received more votes in that election than a Republican ever had. Emma served in that capacity until she retired in 1984 from the department. She was a lifelong advocate for community causes and rights of minorities. She challenged television and radio broadcasters in hiring practices and portrayal of blacks in television. BCFM challenged the FCC licenses of stations. As a result, advisory boards were established with WABC TV and WNBC TV and community affairs positions were established with most of the local broadcast stations.

The Foundation for Minority Interest in Media, founded in 1989, now known as the Emma L. Bowen Foundation is an outgrowth of BCFM. The Foundation provides opportunities for minority youth to learn, be mentored and develop into highly qualified media professionals. The Foundation is supported by many of the same stations Emma Bowen approached years ago as well as many new networks, cable companies, and other media related companies. Mrs. Bowen's legacy endures. Because of her pioneering leadership, men and women of color occupy influential roles in American media, including writing, producing, directing, reporting, performing, and management. Today, thousands of families, adults, children, and senior citizens have access to the resources they need to live healthy lives.

== Emma L. Bowen Humanitarian Medal ==
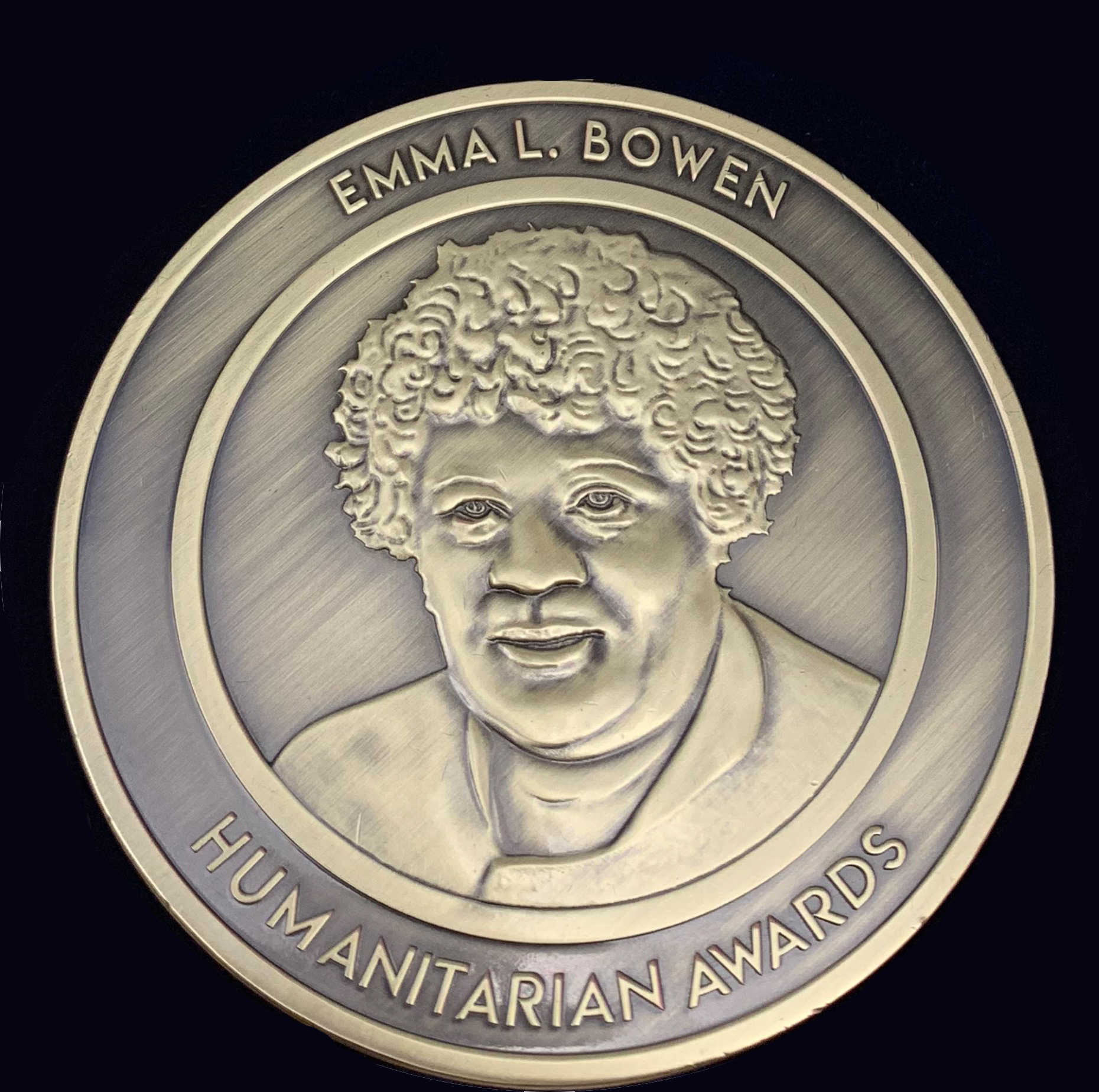
Emma L. Bowen Humanitarian Medal

The Emma L Bowen Humanitarian Medal is bestowed upon individuals who provide exceptional leadership and selflessness.

Previous honorees include Tony Award-winning choreographer Bill T. Jones, NBC New York Meteorologist Janice Huff, Born This Way Foundation Co-founder and President Cynthia Germanotta, Civil Rights Icon The Reverend Al Sharpton, New York City Mayor David N. Dinkins, Congressman Charles Rangel, Businessman and Philanthropist Mark Goldsmith, Opioid Specialist Dr. Melissa Freeman and the late Percy E. Sutton. Held annually, the Humanitarian Awards Gala is the biggest event of the year for the Bowen Center. Funds raised from the gala help to continue the Bowen Center's life-sustaining services including its mental health services for children and adults alike, addiction treatment services, food pantry, and more.
