= Marc A. Zimmerman =

American public health researcher

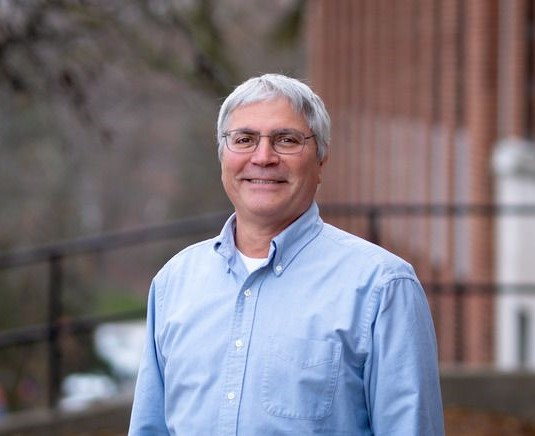
Marc Zimmerman

Marc A. Zimmerman (born 1954) is a professor of public health at the University of Michigan.

== Education ==
Zimmerman received a Bachelor of Science in psychology from the University of Massachusetts Amherst in 1976, his Master of Science in Interdisciplinary Studies from the University of Oregon in 1980 and received a Doctor of Philosophy in Psychology University of Illinois at Urbana-Champaign 1986.

== Academic career ==
Zimmerman began his academic career in 1986. In 1989, he joined the University of Michigan School of Public Health as an assistant professor in the Department of Health Behavior and Health Equity. His research topics focused on adolescent health and resiliency, and empowerment theory. In 1994, he received funding from the National Institutes of Health to lead the Flint Adolescent Study (FAS) to explore risk, promotive factors and health outcomes. In 2004, Zimmerman led the development of Youth Empowerment Solutions (YES), a program designed to help adolescents develop leadership skills through community projects. In 2017, he was named the Marshall H. Becker Collegiate Professor at the University of Michigan School of Public Health. In 2021, he became an inaugural co-director of the Institute for Firearm Injury Prevention at the University of Michigan.

== Honors, awards and positions ==
Zimmerman is the founding director of the Prevention Research Center (PRC) of Michigan (established 1998) and of the Michigan Youth Violence Prevention Center (MI-YVPC). He was the editor-in-chief for the Health Education & Behavior from 1998 to 2010 and Youth & Society from 2014 to 2025. Zimmerman was awarded the Hometown Health Hero Award, Michigan Department of Community Health in 2011, named the Marshall H. Becker Collegiate Professor in 2017, won the University of Michigan, President's Award for Public Impact in 2019, and was elected to the National Academy of Medicine (NAM) in 2024.
