= National Commission for Health Education Credentialing =

The National Commission for Health Education Credentialing, Inc. (NCHEC, /ˈɛntʃɛk/) is a professional health education credentialing body in the United States of America. The commission's office is located in Whitehall, Pennsylvania.

NCHEC is the national accrediting organization for health educators, promoting the certified health education specialist (CHES) credential and administers the affirmation of approved continuing education. The provision and administration of the CHES credential represents the major strategy of NCHEC to fulfil its mission to "improve the practice of health education and to serve the public and profession of health education by certifying health education specialists, promoting professional development, and strengthening professional preparation and practice."

Although independent, NCHEC often works with national organizations to promote the CHES credential. NCHEC routinely interacts with the American Public Health Association (APHA), the Society for Public Health Education (SOPHE), the American Association for Health Education (AAHE), the Coalition of National Health Education Organizations (CNHEO), Universities and Colleges, various US Government agencies, and especially health educators in a wide variety of occupational and professional endeavors.

== Credentialing of Certified Health Education Specialists (CHES) ==
=== Rationale for the Credential ===
Credentialing health educators is an attestation of not only the professional's knowledge, but also their ability to act prudently and skillfully in a number of health education roles, including public health practice, research, advocacy, promotion, education. It also helps to promote further professional development of the health educator with continuing education and a sense of pride, and offers interaction with other health educators in a number of societies, agencies, and other professional settings. Credentialing health educators has also helped employers to recognize health educators who meet a baseline standard of professional competency.

=== Requirements for CHES ===
- A bachelor's degree (e.g., BS/BA in public health or health education, etc.) or
- A master's degree (e.g., MPH, M.Sc., MEd, etc.) or
- A doctoral degree (e.g., PhD, DrPH, EdD, DHSc etc.) and
- Official academic transcript detailing an emphasis in public health and health education-related studies or 25 semester hours of work in the seven areas of responsibility.

=== Continuing Education Credits Toward CHES Certification and Recertification ===
Any given CHES is credentialed for a 5 year period, in which time the CHES is required to earn 75 credit hours, or "Continuing Education Contact Hours" (CECH). NCHEC has suggested that the CHES accumulate 15 CECHs every year and have all requirements met about 3 months prior to the CHES recertification date.

NCHEC has the defined the awarding of continuing education in two categories:

- Category I
  - "Pre-approved" education from "designated providers"
  - Of the mandated 75 hours, at least 45 must be Category I
- Category II
  - Educational activities from undesignated providers
  - Education must pertain to the seven areas of responsibility

NCHEC does not charge money for CECHs, but acknowledges providers may need to do so to recoup administrative costs.

=== Testing Schedule and Cost ===
NCHEC provides continuous development and oversight of the nationally-standardized CHES examination offered biannually across at testing centers across the US (April and October cycles).

1. Spring — the "April Cycle" is the open preregistration period between November 1 and February 1 of each year.
2. Fall – the "October Cycle" is the open preregistration period between May 1 and August 1 of each year.

Academic health education programs have been encouraged to comply with a competency based curriculum guided by the National Commission on Health Education Credentialing (NCHEC) Areas of Responsibility and Competency for Entry-Level Health Educators. NCHEC promotes seven general areas of responsibility with several supporting points of competency (not shown):

1. Assess Individual and Community Needs for Health Education
2. Plan Health Education Strategies, Interventions, and Programs
3. Implement Health Education Strategies, Interventions, and Programs
4. Conduct Evaluation and Research Related to Health Education
5. Administer Health Education Strategies, Interventions, and Programs
6. Serve as a Health Education Resource Person
7. Communicate and Advocate for Health and Health Education

== Code of Ethics for the Health Education Profession ==
NCHEC promotes a code of ethics for health educators. The history and rationale for this code and other affiliating organizations can be found at here at the Coalition of National Health Education Organizations (CNHEO): . The code is constituted of a preamble and 6 articles.

Preamble

The health education profession is dedicated to excellence in the practice of promoting individual, family, organizational and community health. The Code of Ethics provides a basis of shared values that health education is practiced. The responsibility of all health educators is to aspire to the highest possible standards of conduct and to encourage the ethical behavior of all those with whom they work.

- Article I: Responsibility to the public.
- Article II: Responsibility to the profession.
- Article III: Responsibility to employers.
- Article IV: Responsibility in the delivery of health education.
- Article V: Responsibility in research and evaluation.
- Article VI: Responsibility in professional preparation.

=== Research Efforts in Promoting National Standards of Health Education ===
NCHEC has been cited in several health education research efforts either peripherally in the context of health education or credentialing, or directly as a significant actor in the public health professions. One study evaluated student adherence to NCHEC areas of responsibility through a service learning or experience-based tracking paradigm.

NCHEC spearheaded the National Health Educator Competencies Update Project (CUP) in 1998 and continued until 2004. The 6-year study used a 19-page questionnaire sent to individuals identified from a number of professional health educator organizations across the US. By the end of the multiphase study, the CUP analysts realized that it represented one of the largest national data sets ever assembled of health educators (N=4,030), and found common sets of competencies valued across the majority of health educators.
