= Chapman Radio =

- Orange, California; United States

Programming
- Format: College radio

Ownership
- Owner: Chapman University

History
- First air date: 1967
- Former call signs: KNAC, KNAB

Links
- Website: chapmanradio.live

Chapman Radio is an independent, internet-only radio station run entirely by students at Chapman University in Orange, California.

== History ==
=== Beginnings ===
Chapman University has hosted some form of radio organization since 1967. The station began as a training course for students interested in broadcasting. The original station could only be heard by the people standing inside the studio. The original call letters for the station were KNAC: “the station with the knack”.

Sometime after, the station moved to Morlan Hall and broadcast within the Morlan Lounge. The station call letters were changed to KNAB, because the engineer who built the station in 1967 took the original call letters. “The station with the KNAB” never caught on as a slogan.

=== Transition to Internet ===
In the early 1990s, KNAB purchased an antenna and began broadcasting over the airwaves. The signal could be received anywhere in Orange County. Certain vagueness existed in the U.S. Federal Communications Commission (FCC) rules regarding low-power radio broadcasting. The problem with this was that KNAB was taking another station’s frequency, and this led to confrontation with that station and the FCC. The university was threatened with a $100,000 fine and the antenna was soon removed.

In 1994, the station moved to Cheverton Hall and functioned on-campus through a short-range “leaky coaxial cable” which served as a short-range antenna. In 2000 plans were made to tear it down. The station moved to Braden Hall.

Braden Hall was torn down and the station moved to its current home in the basement of Henley Hall in the fall of 2006.

In 2002, KNAB was given a ‘cease and desist’ order from a station in Colorado using the call sign. Consequently, the station changed its official title to Chapman Radio. New call letters were not sought, because Chapman Radio does not have an FCC license. No license has been issued to a radio station in Southern California for over five years and there are over one hundred organizations on the waiting list.

The alternative to broadcasting on the airwaves is online streaming.

During this time, Chapman Radio belonged to the Dodge College of Film, but after administrative differences, the film school dropped Chapman Radio. Threatened to be removed from Chapman University, the two general managers at the time had to pull together a presentation, and beg the school to keep them. Professor Allen Levy joined Radio as the official professor radio overseer.

=== Today ===
Chapman Radio belongs to the Chapman University School of Communications. It is the largest organization on campus, with about 300 members.

After Braden dorms were torn down in 2006, Chapman Radio was relocated to Henley Basement, where it has broadcast from since. Henley Basement was converted to a gym in the Autumn of 2019. Chapman Radio DJs now get to look at the sweaty athletic youth of Chapman University. As of 2013, Chapman Radio is the largest club and second oldest student-run organization on campus, after The Panther newspaper, which became fully independent in 1960. The highest listenership set by any show on Chapman Radio has been 126 listeners by the talk show "KT KulTure" during the spring semester of 2017.

== Format ==
Chapman Radio has over 150 live shows and almost 300 DJs, each broadcasting live either once a week or every other week. There are no restrictions on content with the exception of explicit lyrics which are allowed after 10 pm - each show develops and broadcasts their own show on any topic. Each show is produced by between one and five students. The Chapman Radio website houses downloadable archives of every episode broadcast for each show. Each show is also available as a podcast for download.
