= Vincent Dole =

American doctor

Vincent Dole (18 May 1913, in Chicago – 1 August 2006) was an American doctor, who, along with his wife, Marie Nyswander (died 1986), developed the use of methadone to treat heroin addiction. Dole and Nyswander, in establishing methadone maintenance treatment (MMT), improved treatment options in addiction medicine which for a century had been based on the conventional view (circa 1965) that narcotic addiction was the result of an intractable moral defect. His work resulted in the partial re-legalization of opioid maintenance in the United States. For this contribution he was a recipient of the 1970 Canada Gairdner International Award, and the 1988 Albert Lasker Award for Clinical Medical Research.

== Heroin treatment ==
Supreme court interpretations of the 1914 Harrison Narcotics Tax Act had criminalized opioid dependency as well as the use of any opioid "for the sole purpose of maintenance." The criminalization and stigmatization of dependent individuals also influenced medical practice. Physicians and pharmacists, who risked being investigated by the Treasury Department officials that monitored their prescriptions, were wary of placing many patients on maintenance. Medical schools provided almost no instruction on addiction.

Dole's patients not only largely stopped heroin use, they expressed an interest in family, friends, work, and becoming fully engaged members of society once more. Though psychiatrists were available counseling was not mandatory. Dole found that the shift of priorities from daily drug-cravings and the endless quest to keep the abstinence syndrome at bay restored to these individuals an inherent sense of self-worth; they resumed family responsibilities as well as employment. The doctors noted that although methadone satisfied the physical cravings of heroin addiction, patients soon became completely tolerant to its effects. Patients would remain "dependent" on methadone but could otherwise live normally.

== Death ==
Dole died on 1 August 2006 at the age of 93, from complications of a ruptured aorta, and was survived by his third wife Margaret Cool, his three children from his first marriage, Vincent Dole, Jr. Susan Dole, and Bruce Dole, grandkids Mia Dole, Elliot Dole, Elizabeth Dole, Alexander Dole, James Dole.
