= Psychological Abstracts =

Abstract and index periodical for psychology

- Producer: American Psychological Association (United States)
- History: 1927–2006

Access
- Cost: print subscription

Coverage
- Disciplines: Psychology
- Record depth: Abstract
- Format coverage: Journal articles, books, technical reports
- Update frequency: Monthly

Print edition
- ISSN: 0033-2887

Psychological Abstracts was an abstract and index periodical and the print counterpart of the PsycINFO database. It was published by the American Psychological Association and was produced for 80 years, ceasing publication at the end of 2006. It was produced monthly and contained summaries (abstracts, bibliographic information, and indexing) of English-language journal articles, technical reports, book chapters, and books in the field of psychology.

In its latter years, it contained much less content than PsycINFO, although it did contain some records for technical reports that are not in PsycINFO. It was organized by subject area according to the PsycINFO Classification Codes.
