= Journal of Urban Health =

- Discipline: Epidemiology, public health
- Language: English
- Edited by: David Vlahov

Publication details
- Former name(s): Transactions of the New York Academy of Medicine; Bulletin of the New York Academy of Medicine
- History: 1851-present
- Publisher: Springer Science+Business Media
- Frequency: Bimonthly
- Impact factor: 1.959 (2016)

Standard abbreviations
- ISO 4: J. Urban Health

Indexing
- ISSN: 1099-3460 (print); 1468-2869 (web)
- LCCN: 98657867
- OCLC no.: 39047564

Links
- Journal homepage; Online access; Online archive

The Journal of Urban Health is a bimonthly peer-reviewed public health journal which serves as a vehicle for publishing articles relevant to urban health including the broader determinants of health and health inequities. It was established in 1851 as the Transactions of the New York Academy of Medicine, and was renamed the Bulletin of the New York Academy of Medicine in 1925. It obtained its current name in 1998. Its parent organization is the New York Academy of Medicine (NYAM). The journal is published by Springer Science+Business Media along with NYAM. The editor-in-chief is David Vlahov (Yale School of Nursing). According to the Journal Citation Reports, the journal has a 2021 impact factor of 5.801.
