= Nancy Padian =

American epidemiologist and medical researcher

Nancy Padian (born 1952) is a medical researcher and former executive director of the Women's Global Health Imperative when it was at the University of California, San Francisco. She is the senior director of prevention at the Pangaea Global AIDS Foundation. Padian has been described as among the "world's foremost experts on the heterosexual transmission of AIDS."

Padian received an undergraduate degree in child development and education from Syracuse University. Though initially interested in psychology, she was drawn to epidemiology by its potential to improve the lives of many people. She subsequently received a master's degree and a doctorate from the School of Public Health at the University of California, Berkeley. Beginning her graduate studies during the early stages of HIV/AIDS research, Padian was among the first to conduct large-scale studies proving heterosexual transmission of HIV, establishing risk factors which can be avoided to minimize harm.

Padian is married to Kevin Padian, Professor of Integrative Biology at the University of California, Berkeley, Curator of Paleontology, University of California Museum of Paleontology and President of the National Center for Science Education.

Padian has been involved in several scientific studies, one which was led by her, was a 10-year study which was regarded as the longest and largest epidemiological study of the heterosexual transmission of HIV at the time.
