= PsycInfo =

American psychologic bibliographic database

- Producer: American Psychological Association (United States)
- History: since 1967

Access
- Providers: APA PsycNet and third-party vendors
- Cost: Subscription

Coverage
- Disciplines: Psychology
- Record depth: Index & abstract
- Format coverage: Journal articles, books, dissertations
- Temporal coverage: since 1887
- Geospatial coverage: Worldwide
- Update frequency: Weekly

Print edition
- Print title: Psychological Abstracts
- Print dates: 1927-2006
- ISSN: 0033-2887

Links
- Website: www.apa.org/pubs/databases/psycinfo/index.aspx
- Title list(s): www.apa.org/pubs/databases/psycinfo/coverage.aspx

PsycInfo (formerly stylized PsycINFO) is a database of abstracts of literature in the field of psychology. It is produced by the American Psychological Association and distributed on the association's APA PsycNet and through third-party vendors. It is the electronic version of the defunct Psychological Abstracts. In 2000, it incorporated PsycLIT which had been published on CD-ROM.

PsycInfo contains citations and summaries since 1887 of journal articles, book chapters, books, and dissertations.

== Overview ==
The database, which is updated weekly, contained over 3.5 million records as of October 2013. Approximately 175,000 records were added to the database in 2012.

== Coverage ==
More than 2,540 peer-reviewed journal titles are included in the database, and they make up 78% of the overall content. Journals are included if they are archival, scholarly, peer-reviewed, and regularly published with titles, abstracts, and keywords in English. As of October 2013, over 1,700 journal titles were included in their entirety (i.e. "cover to cover"). Articles were selected for psychological relevance from the remaining titles.

Chapters from authored and edited books make up 11% of database, while entire authored and edited books make up 4% of the database. Books are selected if they are scholarly, professional, or research-based, English-language, published worldwide, and relevant to psychology.

Dissertations are selected from Dissertation Abstracts International (A and B), and make up 10% of database. They are selected on basis of classification in DAI in sections with psychological relevance. The database contains abstracts in dissertation records starting from 1995.

Publications from at least 50 countries are included, with journals in more than 27 languages, and non-English titles in Roman alphabets since 1978.

== Record contents ==
Each record contains a bibliographic citation, abstract, index terms from the Thesaurus of Psychological Index Terms, keywords, classification categories, population information, the geographical location of the research population, and cited references for journal articles, book chapters, and books, mainly since 2001. Records of books include the book's table of contents.

Abstracts are included since 1995, and virtually 100% of records have abstracts (0.007% have no abstracts). For non-dissertation documents added since 1967, 99.2% contain abstracts.

The 11th Edition (print) of Thesaurus of Psychological Index Terms was released in July 2007, containing 200 new terms. There are more than 8,400 controlled terms and cross-references, with hierarchical, alphabetical, and subject arrangements. Records are indexed with the most specific term applicable, and major and minor terms assigned, with a maximum of 15 total terms, 5 major terms. The Thesaurus, no longer available in print, is included with all PsycInfo licenses and is updated regularly.

The classification system consists of 22 major categories and 135 subcategories, and a list of codes. Each record is assigned to one or two classifications.

There were more than 57 million cited references in approximately 1.4 million entries for journal articles, books, and book chapters as of October 2013, all in APA-style format.

== Historic records ==
- Sources: Psychological Abstracts 1927–1966; Psychological Bulletin 1921–1926; American Journal of Psychology 1887–1966; All APA journals back to first issue of publication; Psychological Index (1894–1935); citations to English language journals only; Classic Books in Psychology of the 20th Century and the Harvard Book List, 1840–1971

All records published in Psychological Abstracts are now in PsycINFO. There are more than 335,000 historic records in PsycINFO, which differ from 1967–present records

No controlled vocabulary (descriptor) field; index field may contain descriptor terms, but they are not controlled; other indexing fields, such as Age Groups, form/Content are not present; classifications are broad only

== Access and cost ==
As PsycInfo has grown, so has the cost of accessing it. At one time it was free to individuals. As of February 2016 it costs at least $11.95 for 24 hours access. Institutions pay much more, but verified members of those institutions can then access PsycInfo for free. APA members get special pricing. There are also discounted access pricing packages with APA's related databases PsycNet, PsycArticles, PsycExtra, etc.

== See also ==
- PsycCRITIQUES
- List of academic databases and search engines
