= Health education =

Education for awareness of and influence on the attitude of health

Health education is a profession of educating people about health. Areas within this profession encompass environmental health, physical health, social health, emotional health, intellectual health, and spiritual health, as well as sexual and reproductive health education. It can also be defined as any combination of learning activities that aim to assist individuals and communities improve their health by expanding knowledge or altering attitudes.

Health education has been defined differently by various sources. The National Conference on Preventive Medicine in 1975 defined it as "a process that informs, motivates, and helps people to adopt and maintain healthy practices and lifestyles, advocates environmental changes as needed to facilitate this goal, and conducts professional training and research to the same end." The Joint Committee on Health Education and Promotion Terminology of 2001 defined Health Education as "any combination of planned learning experiences based on sound theories that provide individuals, groups, and communities the opportunity to acquire information and the skills needed to make quality health decisions." The World Health Organization (WHO) defined Health Education as consisting of "consciously constructed opportunities for learning involving some form of communication designed to improve health literacy, including improving knowledge, and developing life skills which are conducive to individual and community health."

== History ==
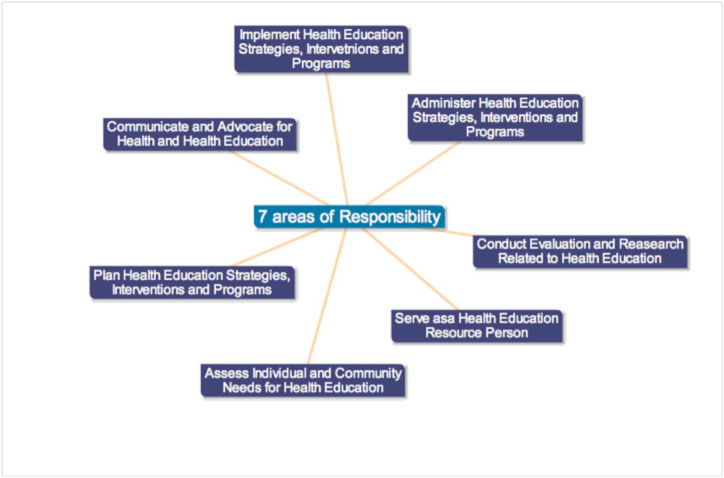
Health education mindmap

It is often thought that health education began with the beginning of healthcare in the earliest parts of history as knowledge was passed from generation to generation. Some people might be surprised to hear that health education's roots date back to the Greeks between the sixth and fourth century B.C.E. They shifted their focus away from superstitious and supernatural conceptions of health and toward the physiological causes of ailments, according to documents that have been uncovered. They discussed how physical health, social settings, and human behavior are connected to preventing disease and sustaining good health. The Greeks wanted to empower people and communities by establishing supportive settings and regulations that would promote taking medication and upholding healthy behaviors. They did this by educating people about their health and developing their skills. Other preserved texts from ancient civilizations in China, India, Egypt, Rome, Persia also contain information regarding various diseases, their kinds of treatments, and even preventative measures. The first medical school was later founded at the end of the 8th century in Salerno, Italy and focused a significant portion of its curriculum on proper hygiene and healthy lifestyles. Much later, Johann Guttenberg's printing press paved the way for making educational materials more accessible as some of the first things to be printed were treatises regarding health. Informational materials containing information about hygiene and healthy lifestyle choices became popular as a tool to combat epidemics. In the 19th century, "awareness-rising" began to increase to improve the knowledge of the average people regarding health and other topics. As medicine has continued to progress, with new fields being created to address new problems, so too has methods of providing health education.

Prior to the 1960s, the physician was primarily in charge and the patients were expected to have a passive role in their own health decisions. In 1976, the Patient Education and Counseling journal was founded and the concept of health education began to really take off. It was around this time that it became apparent that if patients are informed about their health, they could improve it through various lifestyle changes. In the 1980s, patient advocacy groups drew attention to the issue of patients' rights such as the right to be informed about health conditions and the potential options for care. The 1990s fully brought about the shared decision making model present in healthcare settings today, including the emergence of electronic health communication. Lastly, in the 21st century, there has been an emergence of associations designated as platforms for promoting health education and communication.

In the United States specifically...

The purpose and approach of health education in the United States have evolved over time. From the late nineteenth to the mid-twentieth century, the aim of public health was controlling the harm from infectious diseases, which were largely under control by the 1950s. The major recent trend regarding changing definitions of school health education is the increasing acknowledgement that school education influences adult behavior.

In the 1970s, health education was viewed in the U.S. mostly as a means of communicating healthy medical practices to those who should be practicing them. By this time, it was clear that reducing illness, death, and rising health care costs could best be achieved through a focus on health promotion and disease prevention. At the heart of the new approach was the role of a health educator.

In the 1980s definitions began to incorporate the belief that education is a means of empowerment for the individual, allowing them to make educated health decisions. Health education in the U.S. became "the process of assisting individuals... to make informed decisions about matters affecting their personal health and the health of others." This definition emerged in the same year as the first national-scale investigation of health education in schools in the United States, which eventually led to a much more aggressive approach to educating young people on matters of health. In the late 1990s the World Health Organization launched a Global Health Initiative which aimed at developing "health-promoting schools", which would enhance school health programs at all levels including: local, regional, national, and global level.

Today school health education is seen in the U.S. as a "comprehensive health curricula", combining community, schools, and patient care practice, in which "Health education covers the continuum from disease prevention and promotion of optimal health to the detection of illness to treatment, rehabilitation, and long-term care." This concept is recently prescribed in current scientific literature as 'health promotion', a phrase that is used interchangeably with health education, although health promotion is broader in focus.

== Role of the Health Education Specialist ==
A health educator is "a professionally prepared individual who serves in a variety of roles and is specifically trained to use appropriate educational strategies and methods to facilitate the development of policies, procedures, interventions, and systems conducive to the health of individuals, groups, and communities" (Joint Committee on Terminology, 2001, p. 100). In other words, they conduct, evaluate, and design activities that pertain to the improvement of the health and well-being of humans. Examples of this include "patient educators, health education teachers, trainers, community organizers, and health program managers." There is a variation in job titles and because of this, there is not a definite system of one health education system. In January 1978 the Role Delineation Project was put into place, in order to define the basic roles and responsibilities for the health educator. The result was a Framework for the Development of Competency-Based Curricula for Entry Level Health Educators (NCHEC, 1985). A second result was a revised version of A Competency-Based Framework for the Professional Development of Certified Health Education Specialists (NCHEC, 1996). These documents outlined the seven areas of responsibilities which are shown below. The Health Education Specialist Practice Analysis (HESPA II 2020) produced "a new hierarchical model with 8 Areas of Responsibility, 35 Competencies, and 193 Sub-competencies".

Health education aims to immediately impact an individual's knowledge, behavior, or attitude about a health-related topic with the ultimate aim of improving quality of life or health status for an individual. Health education utilizes several different intervention strategies in its practices to improve quality of life and health status. Health education intervention strategies involve a planned combination of elements that work together to produce change in an individual's skills, behavior, knowledge, or status related to health.

=== Peer Health Educators ===
Peer health education is described as student's taking initiative to inform their peers on how to live healthy lifestyles. Prevention is the biggest aspect of this idea and often includes alcohol, sexual health, and emotional wellbeing education in addition to many other aspects. Sloane and Zimmer also describe peer health education as "motivational models designed to empower students to help each other promote positive health beliefs and behaviors" Health education specialists often advise peer educators as well; this creates relationships with health professionals while providing relevant resources and models necessary to educate the most students possible.

The most research on peer educators has been done within colleges and universities within Western-civilizations. However, a specific example of peer health education being utilized is seen within The Shantou Experience in China. In this experience, medical students were selected to educate their peers on topics from diet and safer sex to mental and physical health. Self-administered questionnaires were used to track results from the participants as well as from the peer health educators. According to the questionnaire results, "All peer educators responded positively and the majority of students respondents positively evaluated. Although some students preferred to seek health information online, approximately one-quarter of the student respondents would contact peer educators". Ultimately, peer education has a greater acceptance in Western-societies and would require "cultural adaptation for greater effectiveness in China" and other Eastern-societies.

== Teaching School Health Education ==
In the United States, around forty states require the teaching of health education. A comprehensive health education curriculum consists of planned learning experiences that will help students achieve desirable attitudes and practices related to critical health issues. Studies have shown that students are able to identify how emotions and healthy eating habits can possibly impact each other. Some of these are: emotional health and a positive self-image; appreciation, respect for, and care of the human body and its vital organs; physical fitness; health issues of alcohol, tobacco, drug use, and substance use disorders; health misconceptions and myths; effects of exercise on the body systems and on general well being; nutrition and weight control; sexual relationships and sexuality, the scientific, social, and economic aspects of community and ecological health; communicable and degenerative diseases including sexually transmitted diseases; disaster preparedness; safety and driver education; factors in the environment and how those factors affect an individual's or population's environmental health (ex: air quality, water quality, food sanitation); life skills; choosing professional medical and health services; and choices of health careers.

=== Mental Health ===
The topic of mental health has been getting more awareness and is becoming a more socially acceptable concept. However the average individual's mental health literacy, one's ability to "...recognize, manage, and prevent mental disorders", is not acceptable. Having a well-developed MHL will allow for students to not only manage their own mental health but help support others too. In Seedaket et als systematic review, they concluded that both school-based and community-based interventions can be successful in improving MHL.

Teaching children about mental health in school can help them see mental health as a normal occurrence and not something that should be ignored. In recent times we have seen an effort to increase this in health programs. The issue now is that "...teachers have limited skills to manage complex mental health difficulties". Mental health and MHL are complex ideas. Teachers do not have adequate medical training to teach students everything that they need to know. To help educators attain the ability to teach mental health topics and build confidence in their ability to teach these topics, more specific training should be done.

Students can be taught about mental health with community-based interventions as well. This allows for experts to be brought in and teach youth about the signs of a mental illness and the ways to help manage them. This information can help increase an individual's MHL and help them in their future. Parents should also be informing their children about these topics. Having open discussions about mental health will create an environment where the child feels comfortable talking about this topic with their guardians. They should also be supportive and willing to listen to any problems their kids have.

== School National Health Education Standards ==
The National Health Education Standards (NHES) are written expectations for what the students should know and be able to do by grades 2, 5, 8, and 12 to promote personal, family, and community health. The standards provide a framework for curriculum development and selection, instruction, and student assessment in health education. The performance indicators articulate specifically what students should know or be able to do in support of each standard by the conclusion of each of the following grade spans: Pre-K–Grade 12. The performance indicators serve as a blueprint for organizing student assessment.

== Health Education Credentials in the United States ==
The National Commission for Health Education Credentialing (NCHEC) is a non-profit organization that provides certification and professional development opportunities for health education specialists in the United States. NCHEC was established in 1988 to improve the quality and consistency of health education in the United States. NCHEC offers several credentialing programs, including the Certified Health Education Specialist (CHES) and the Master Certified Health Education Specialist (MCHES) designations. NCHEC also provides continuing education opportunities for health education specialists, hosts an annual conference, and advocates for the profession of health education. The organization is governed by a Board of Commissioners and is supported by a network of volunteers, partners, and stakeholders in the health education field.

Health educators may gain professional certification in teaching health education in the United States by passing the Certified Health Education Specialist (CHES) exam. The CHES credential was created in 1989 and was later accredited in 2008 by the National Commission of Certifying Agencies. The National Commission for Health Education offers this exam in April and October each year to individuals that qualify. The CHES exam consists of 150 multiple choice competency-based questions that test individuals in the Eight Areas of Responsibility for Health Education Specialists. These eight areas include assessing individual and community needs, planning health education programs and interventions, implementing health education programs and interventions, evaluating and researching health outcomes, programs, and interventions, advocating for health education, leadership and management in health education, communicating health education, and ethics and professionalism for health educators. Individuals are eligible to take the exam if they meet certain academic and educational requirements. Individuals must hold a bachelor's, master's, or doctoral degree that was obtained from an accredited institution. The transcript of this degree must show that an individual completed a major related to health education or completed a minimum of 25 semester hours in qualifying health education related courses. Individuals that have not yet obtained their bachelor's, master's, or doctoral degree but otherwise qualify for the CHES exam may sit for the exam with the condition that they will graduate within ninety days of their CHES examination date.

The National Commission for Health Education later created the Master Certified Health Education Specialist (MCHES) exam in order to certify advanced competencies in health education specialists. The MCHES first began being administered in 2011 and it gained accreditation from the National Commission of Certifying Agencies in 2013. Individuals that have actively held the CHES certification for five years are eligible to take the MCHES exam. Individuals that are not CHES certified or have been actively CHES certified for less than five years, have five years of work experience as a health education specialist, and have a Master's degree in a field related to health education or a minimum of 25 semester hours completed in qualifying health education courses at the master or doctoral level are also eligible for the MCHES exam.

It is not required for individuals to obtain CHES or MCHES certification in order to work as a health education specialist in the United States. However, many employers give preference to applicants that are Certified Health Education Specialists and both credentials allow individuals to increase their employment opportunities and competitiveness.

== Health Education Code of Ethics ==
The Health Education Code of Ethics has been a work in progress since approximately 1976, begun by the Society for Public Health Education (SOPHE).

"The Code of Ethics that has evolved from this long and arduous process is not seen as a completed project. Rather, it is envisioned as a living document that will continue to evolve as the practice of Health Education changes to meet the challenges of the new millennium."

== Health Education Societies in the United States ==
=== Society for Public Health Educators ===
The Society for Public Health Educators (SOPHE) is an independent professional society of health educators, academics, and education researchers that was founded in 1950. Their mission is to "Promote the health of all people through education". SOPHE works with different health educators to promote healthy behaviors, healthy communities, and healthy environments. SOPHE helps fund and drive research on health education theory and practice.

=== American Public Health Association ===
The American Public Health Association (APHA) is a professional association that promotes good health and strengthens the public health profession by covering general information, issues, policies, news, and much more regarding the topic of health. The mission of this association is to "improve the health of the public and achieve equity in health status."

Members of this association include those that work in the public health field, healthcare professionals, or anyone with an interest in public health. Membership requires a fee based on employment status and offers many benefits such as networking opportunities, webinars, access to the American Journal of Public Health, etc.

=== American Association of Health Education ===
The American Association of Health Education (AAHE) is the oldest health education membership organization in the United States. It was established in 1937 to serve and assist health education professionals and it is one of six organizations that comprise the American Alliance for Health, Physical Education, Recreation, and Dance. Currently, the organization has a membership of over 5,500 health education professionals. The organization works to provide its members strategies, tools, and approaches related to health education and health promotion that can be used for a variety of public health settings.

=== International Union for Health Promotion and Education ===
Originally called Interim Commission, the International Union for Health Promotion and Education (IUHPE) was created in 1951 by Lucien Viborel, a then consultant to the WHO and United Nations, to focus a division for health education. Their mission is to promote global health and create health equity. Every three years they hold a World Conference on Health Promotion and Health Education. The Executive Board is made up of the President, the past-President, a maximum of 15 global members, and the regional Vice-Presidents. The organization is also made of memberships that are individual or institutional subscriptions that Health Educators can join.

=== Coalition of National Health Education Organizations ===
The Coalition of National Health Education Organizations (CNHEO) is an organization that was established in 1972 to serve at the national level by facilitating communication as well as collaborating and coordinating with individuals in other health organizations across the United States. The Coalition holds monthly meetings that are similar to those of public health departments where discussions are held to address any previous updates, finances and other current events that are appropriate for the many organizations CHNEO is in contact and collaboration with.

== School health education worldwide ==
=== Romania ===
Since 2001, the Ministry of Education, Research, Youth, and Sports developed a national curriculum on Health Education. The National Health Education Programme in Romanian Schools was considered a priority for the intervention of the GFATM (Global Fund) and UN Agencies.

For the development of students' acquirement of practical skills and knowledge to have a new specialization in Nutrition and Dietetics, the study program was initiated in the University of Medicine and Pharmacy (UMF) of Iuliu Hațieganu in 2008. Other universities continued to have the authority of this study including the University of Medicine, Pharmacy, Science, and Technology (UMFST) of Târgu Mureş, Iaşi, and Timişoara. The 104 students from these universities also participated in "Nutrition Medicine of the Future," the first National Symposium of Nutrition and Dietetics on 6–7 May 2011 to give and hear lectures. The second edition of this Symposium invited more International participants, such as the International Federation of Dietitians with the attendance of more than 150 students and other professionals.

=== Japan ===
==== Yogo Teachers ====
School nurses in Japan are called yogo teachers also known as hoken kyoushi (保健教師). Yogo teachers take a part of the educational staff to support students growth through the health education and services which are under school educational activities. Yogo teachers are trained to take care of student's physical health and their mental health. Through their observations of student's actions, the yogo teachers are able to identify students early-stage mood disorders and help support them as a school education. The problems causing mood disorders may include, family history, physical illness, previous diagnosis, and trauma. As many students have traumas, yogo teachers are able to detect physical or mental abuse cases (which could be a cause of trauma) more than other teachers. Therefore, yogo teachers are expected to take quick actions during the students early stages of mood disorder or child abuse as soon as possible.

==== Nutrition ====
Shokuiku (食育) is the Japanese term for "food education". The law defines it as the "acquisition of knowledge about food and nutrition, as well as the ability to make appropriate decisions through practical experience with food, with the aim of developing people's ability to live on a healthy diet".

It was initiated by Sagen Ishizuka, a famous military doctor and pioneer of the macrobiotic diet. Following the introduction of Western fast food in the late 20th century, the Japanese government mandated education in nutrition and food origins, starting with the Basic Law of Shokuiku in 2005, and followed with the School Health Law in 2008. Universities have established programs to teach shokuiku in public schools, as well as investigating its effectiveness through academic study.

Major concerns that led to the development of shokuiku law include:

- School children skipping breakfast.
- Children purchasing meals at a convenience store instead of eating with their parents.
- Families not eating meals together.

Classes in shokuiku will study the processes of making food, such as farming or fermentation; how additives create flavor; and where food comes from.

=== Poland ===
Health education in Poland is not mandatory. However, research has shown that even with implantation of health education that the adolescents of Poland were still not choosing to live a healthy lifestyle. Health education is still needed in Poland, but the factor of what is actually available, especially in rural areas, and what is affordable affects the decisions more than what is healthy.

Although Polish schools curricula include health education, it is not a separate subject but concluded in other subjects such as nature, biology, and physical education. Some measurements have been taken to address this issue by non-government organizations.

=== Taiwan ===
Health education in Taiwan focuses on multiple topics, including:

- Education for student to enhance their health status.
- Assists parents to use health resources and health education information.
- Teach students to understand specific diseases and basic medical knowledge.

=== Ireland ===
One school in Ireland has been teaching health education since 2004. The children are able to learn about their physical health, for instance, the students were able to go on a school walk, learn traditional Irish dancing, and learn how to swim. However, not all their activities are based on physical health. The kids also learn about healthy eating. One activity involves a food pyramid. Here students will learn about different foods and how they affect our health. At the bottom of the food pyramid are fruits and veggies like apples and carrots and at the top of the pyramid are fried foods like fries. The pyramid is wooden and has different colors corresponding to the level of the pyramid. Green corresponds with the lowest level of the pyramid and so on. The foods on the pyramid are 3D toys so the kids can see what the food looks like.

=== United Kingdom ===
The UK had implemented health education in their school system since the early 2000s. According to Gov.UK "... all pupils will study compulsory health education as well as new reformed relationships education in primary school and relationships and sex education in secondary school (Gov.UK, 2018)". However, these are not the only things being learned. The UK school system also teaches their students about mental health, leading a healthy lifestyle, and education about obesity.

== Health Education and Sustainable Development Goals ==
Health Education is crucial in working towards achieving Sustainable Development Goals (SDG) created by the United Nations (UN). The UN created these goals in the hope that there will be motivation in following "a shared blueprint for peace and prosperity for people and the planet, now and into the future." By increasing Health Education implementation, it contributes to bringing awareness and learning to individuals, creating an understanding of the significance of international health and well-being.

== See also ==
- Dorothy Nyswander
- Health promotion
- Online health communities
- Personal, social, health and economic education
- Physical Education
- Public Health
- School Health Education Study
- Health skills

== Books ==
- Centers for Disease Control & Prevention. (2007). National Health Education Standards. Retrieved May 1, 2009, from Characteristics of Effective Health Education Curricula - SHER | Healthy Schools | CDC
- Coalition of National Health Education Organizations. Health Education Code of Ethics. November 8, 1999, Chicago, IL. Retrieved May 1, 2009, from CNHEO
- Joint Committee on Terminology. (2001). Report of the 2000 Joint Committee on Health Education and Promotion Terminology. American Journal of Health Education.
- McKenzie, J., Neiger, B., Thackeray, R. (2009). Planning, Implementing, & Evaluating Health Promotion Programs. 5th edition. San Francisco, CA: Pearson Education, Inc.
- Simons-Morton, B. G., Greene, W. H., & Gottlieb, N. H.. (2005). Introduction to Health Education and Health Promotion. 2nd edition. Waveland Press.
- World Health Organization. (1998). Health Promotion Glossary. Retrieved May 1, 2009, from Wayback Machine.
