= Marie Nyswander =

American psychiatrist and psychoanalyst (1919–1986)

- Born: March 13, 1919; Reno, Nevada
- Died: April 20, 1986 (aged 67)
- Occupations: Psychiatrist and psychoanalyst
- Known for: Methadone treatment of heroin addicts

Marie Nyswander (March 13, 1919 – April 20, 1986) was an American psychiatrist and psychoanalyst known for developing and popularizing the use of methadone to treat heroin addiction.

== Biography ==
Nyswander was born on March 13, 1919, in Reno, Nevada. Her father, James Nyswander, was a mathematics professor and her mother was noted health educator Dorothy Bird Nyswander; they divorced soon after her birth, and Nyswander followed her mother to Berkeley, Salt Lake City, and New York City. Her original name was Mary Elizabeth Nyswander; she took the name Marie as a teenager.

Nyswander graduated from Sarah Lawrence College in 1937 and trained as a physician and surgeon at the Cornell University medical school until 1944; while at Cornell, she was briefly married to anatomy instructor Charles Berry. After finishing her studies at Cornell, she attempted to join the Navy, but discovered that they did not allow women to serve as surgeons. Instead she took up a position at the Lexington Narcotic Hospital in Lexington, Kentucky, under the auspices of the United States Public Health Service, where researchers such as Abraham Wikler were beginning to uncover the physiological basis of addiction. At Lexington, addicts were treated harshly: for instance, women at the facility were confined to their building except for a once-a-week movie. Nyswander's attempts to provide outside walks for the women were halted after they were caught sending messages to the male inmates, and she was also reprimanded for giving out morphine shots to the inmates one Christmas.

In the late 1940s, Nyswander began studying psychoanalysis at the New York Medical College, under the supervision of Lewis Wolberg, and in the 1950s she held a private practice in New York. In 1955 she helped found the Narcotic Addiction Research Project, a program for treating drug addicts using psychotherapy, and through the 1950s and 1960s she continued to treat addicts in two programs, a clinic for jazz musicians that she founded with Charles Winick and a local church program. She also treated patients of other types and wrote two books, one about her experiences treating drug addicts and another about sexuality. During this period she was married to her second husband, Leonard Wallace Robinson, a writer and editor; they became engaged in 1953, divorced in 1965, and had no children. A book review from 1962 describes her as "slim, brunette ... wife of a writer and mother of a 15-year-old son".

In the early 1960s, Vincent Dole invited Nyswander to join his staff at Rockefeller University. Dole was a metabolic specialist who had become interested in addiction in 1962 when a colleague had gone on sabbatical, leaving a vacancy on Rockefeller's Committee on Narcotics that Dole filled; he called on Nyswander because of her expertise with addiction. In turn, Nyswander had become frustrated by the high relapse rate of her addicted patients, a factor that prepared her to find a non-psychological explanation for their addiction. Dole and Nyswander began their research by observing the effects of different narcotics on addicts, and discovered that morphine and methadone led to quite different behaviors. By 1965 (the year Dole and Nyswander married), they had data on 22 different subjects, and published their findings in the Journal of the American Medical Association, followed up by several articles in other journals. They hypothesized that heroin addiction was a metabolic disease, and that methadone could be used as a drug to treat this disease, contradicting earlier beliefs that addiction was purely a personality disorder and that addiction to methadone remained an addiction the treatment of which should lead to abstinence. Dole and Nyswander soon set up a local program for treating addicts with methadone, and similar programs eventually became widespread around the country and around the world.

Nyswander died in 1986 of cancer, possibly caused by her lifelong addiction to cigarettes. Until her death, she continued to promote methadone treatment and to defend it against its critics.

== Authorship ==
Nyswander is the author or co-author of a number of books and papers:

=== Books ===
- Nyswander, Marie (1956), The Drug Addict as a Patient, Grune & Stratton, ASIN B0007DNW6O. This book already contained the idea that drug addiction should be treated as a medical problem. It begins with a description of the legal history under which, beginning with the Harrison Narcotic Act of 1914, drug addiction was criminalized and clinics closed. It continues to describe the pharmacology, physiology, psychology, and sociology of opiate addiction. Although it discusses methadone as a method for getting addicts through the period of physical withdrawal, it considers psychotherapy to be a more important part of addiction treatment. At the time Vincent Dole began his researches into addiction in the early 1960s, it was the only study of street addicts he could find and in 1966 the New York Times described it as Nyswander's "definitive book".
- Robinson, Marie N. (1959), The Power of Sexual Surrender, New American Library, ASIN B0007EWYQ2. This book, about frigidity in women, also advocates that women take a traditional family role at home, "keeping the tone of the home happy and loving" while letting "the men go out and make the money". Based on Freudian analysis, it defines women who reach orgasm through clitoral stimulation as being frigid and claims that women lacking sexual satisfaction have themselves to blame rather than their partners. In the mid-1970s this book was popularized again by the success of Marabel Morgan's anti-feminist self-help book The Total Woman and lecture courses associated with it.

=== Selected papers ===
- Dole, Vincent P.; Nyswander, Marie E. (1965), "A medical treatment for diacetylmorphine (heroin) addiction. A clinical trial with methadone hydrochloride", Journal of the American Medical Association, 193 (8): 646–650, doi:10.1001/jama.1965.03090080008002, PMID 14321530. This is the original 22-patient study pioneering the use of methadone to treat heroin addiction. Kuehn writes that this paper "marked a sea change in the treatment of addiction" because of its treatment of heroin addiction as a disease that could be treated by medication, and quotes Yale University psychiatry professor Thomas Kosten as saying that this paper "has had a tremendous impact on the treatment of individuals addicted to opioids and on the larger field of addiction treatment".

Subsequent to this work, Nyswander coauthored many other papers on heroin addiction and methadone treatment. The most heavily cited of these are:

- Dole, Vincent P.; Nyswander, Marie E.; Kreek, Mary Jeanne (1966), "Narcotic blockade", Archives of Internal Medicine, 118 (4): 304–309, doi:10.1001/archinte.118.4.304, PMID 4162686. This paper describes the effects of heroin on its addicts, the ability of methadone to block those effects, and a treatment regimen to induce this blocking phenomenon.
- Dole, Vincent P.; Nyswander, Marie E.; Warner, Alan (1968), "Successful treatment of 750 criminal addicts", Journal of the American Medical Association, 206 (12): 2708–2711, doi:10.1001/jama.206.12.2708, PMID 5754883. This is a report on a much larger-scale four-year study following on to the original 22-subject study of Dole and Nyswander.
- Dole, Vincent P.; Nyswander, Marie E. (1967), "Heroin addiction—a metabolic disease", Archives of Internal Medicine, 120 (1): 19–24, doi:10.1001/archinte.120.1.19, PMID 6028693.

== Awards and honors ==
Nyswander was the co-recipient with her spouse Vincent Dole of the first annual award of the National Drug Abuse Conference in 1978. In 1982, they won the Nathan B. Eddy Award of the College on Problems of Drug Dependence.

Nyswander and Dole's work led to the creation in 1982 of the Nyswander–Dole Award, given annually by the American Association for the Treatment of Opioid Dependence for "extraordinary work and service in the opioid treatment field". It is nicknamed 'The Marie Award', and Nyswander and Dole were the first recipients. Another award in her name, the Marie E. Nyswander Award of the International Association for Pain and Chemical Dependency, is given for "lifetime accomplishments in advancing compassionate and humane treatment of patients suffering from pain".

Nyswanderweg, a street in Hamburg, Germany, was named after Nyswander in 1994. The Marie Nyswander Clinic of the Beth Israel Medical Center is also named after Nyswander.

In 2000, a special issue of the Mount Sinai Journal of Medicine concerning methadone treatment was dedicated to Nyswander's memory.
