= Society for Public Health Education =

- Abbreviation: SOPHE
- Formation: 1950
- Type: 501(c)(3) professional non-profit organization
- Purpose: health educators academics education researchers
- Location(s): United States; Northern Mexico; Canada
- Members: 4,000 members

The Society for Public Health Education (SOPHE) is an independent professional society of health educators, academics, and education researchers that was founded in 1950.

== Mission ==
SOPHE's mission is to "Promote the health of all people through education.". SOPHE advocates and promotes healthy behaviors, healthy communities, and healthy environments through its membership, its network of local chapters, and numerous relationships with global, national, or local organizations, both public and private.

As an organization, SOPHE also aims to "stimulate" research on health education theory and practice. SOPHE's official peer-reviewed journals are Health Education & Behavior, Health Promotion Practice, and Pedagogy in Health Promotion: The Scholarship of Teaching and Learning.

SOPHE also advocates health policy legislation in the United States and other countries, specifically in favor of advancing the profession of health education and promotion, as well as the capacity of governments to fulfill the health education needs of the public. SOPHE is the only independent organization whose purpose is to exclusively promote public health education.

== Membership ==
SOPHE has roughly 4,000 members, but this varies from year to year. Its membership represents a diversity of disciplines that span professionals in health and medical education, fitness, school health, public health research, clinical research, health promotion, health policymakers, environmental health educators, and other community health professionals and students in the United States and more than 25 other countries. Members of SOPHE are known to work in elementary and secondary schools, universities and colleges, for-profit organizations, voluntary non-profit organizations, health care settings, worksites, and local/state/federal government agencies, and clinical research organizations.

According to its 2011 report, approximately 60% of SOPHE's members have earned a postgraduate degree, including Master of Public Health (MPH), Doctor of Public Health (DrPH), and Doctor of Philosophy (PhD), or Doctor of Education (DEd or EdD). Many SOPHE members are also certified health education specialists, or "CHES" as credentialed by the National Commission for Health Education Credentialing, but this is not universal across the society.

== Chapters ==
SOPHE has 20 active chapters covering 34 states, including Northern Mexico and Canada.

== Organization designation ==
SOPHE is registered in the United States as a 501 (c)(3) professional non-profit organization.

== See also ==
- American Public Health Association
- National Commission for Health Education Credentialing
