= Residence hall association =

In the United States, a residence halls association (RHA) is a student-run university residence hall organization that is usually (but not always) the parent organization for individual hall governments. Their function is similar to a student government, except that most of their activities pertain to on-campus living. Most RHAs are a division of their student governments — however, a few are independent and equal or greater. Many residence hall associations were created at campuses across the US in the early twentieth century. RHA is the largest student-run organization of its kind in the world.

== Programming ==
Many residence halls associations are primarily concerned with programming activities for residents and providing financial and planning support to other entities (such as Resident Advisors/Assistants, Hall Councils, or other groups associated with campus housing). Examples of these programs may include orientation week and opening activities, diversity programming and education, educational programming, health and wellness activities and education, hall competitions, and closing week activities.

== Resident issues ==
Sometimes RHAs are also involved in resident issues on campuses. Often, RHAs deal with concerns about things such as hall visitation hours, hall security, hall safety, building services (repairs and upgrades), and general hall environment. Some organizations also have the authority to vote on legislative policy changes on their campuses while other organizations remain in advisory, support, or non-involvement capacities regarding campus and housing policies.

== Structure ==
RHAs are generally structured with an executive board that leads the organization and a general assembly of hall councils and occasionally other hall-based groups. Each hall council is considered the hall government for the hall they represent. In most cases there is one hall council per residence hall, however smaller halls are sometimes joined together to serve as one unified body and larger halls are sometimes broken down into smaller units.

=== Affiliation ===
Many RHAs are affiliated with the National Association of College and University Residence Halls (NACURH), a student-run nonprofit which coordinates communication among RHAs and hosts a national conference, and local conferences through eight other regional subsidiaries. Affiliated RHAs have one member who serves as a National Communications Coordinator (NCC), responsible for communication with the regional and national associations as well as other RHAs.

A number of sub-regional associations also exist that have no direct association with NACURH, such as IRHA in Illinois, which is the last state-wide Residential Organization, hosting their own independent sub-regional conferences and coordinating inter-school communication. Some schools in such areas dual affiliate.

=== Budget ===
Many RHAs receive funds from fees charged to residents every semester. Most schools' RHAs get their money from a university general fund, although some RHAs such as Michigan State University's collect theirs through student-voted taxes. Many also raise their own funds; especially young or small-school RHAs which do not receive adequate or any funds from their school. Some schools such as Colorado State University's RHA and National Residence Hall Honorary chapter receive a portion of funds from their housing and dining departments, allocated per student living in the halls. RHAs that are affiliated with NACURH can partner with CampusCube or On Campus Marketing to receive a portion of the profits from their sales to their campus of care packages, linens, and other products.

RHA budgets are often spent on "programs", or activities hosted by the RHA intended for the resident student body. RHA money is also used to finance travel arrangements and fees for attending regional and national conferences (e.g. NACURH), provide stipends or subsidized housing fees to Executives and RHA staff members, and may also be distributed to individual residence halls for hall activities.

=== Status ===
Most RHAs are considered a part of their school's student government; however some, such as Arizona State University, Rowan University, Michigan State, Florida Institute of Technology, Fordham University, University of Delaware, University of Florida, University of Wisconsin - River Falls, University of North Dakota, Colorado State University, East Tennessee State University, Ithaca College, Washington University in St. Louis, and Frostburg State University, are fully separate organizations. This can cause overlap between student government's involvement in residential issues or activities, and the efforts of the RHA. Cross-representation, such as a special RHA seat in student government, may exist. In addition, members of the university's residence/residential life staff (resident assistants and resident directors) may also become involved in membership and in leadership in different Residence Hall Associations, causing conflict of interest at times, as residents of residential communities try to voice their opinions regarding members of the residential life program while the members of the accused party are present. In some cases, Resident Assistants and other professional staff are barred from serving in an RHA position, though they may have options to voice their opinions through RHA or a staff council.

=== Associated campus groups ===
RHAs may be directly associated with student government, as noted above. In addition, many RHAs also sponsor a school chapter of the National Residence Hall Honorary (NRHH), an honor society for resident students, as the national NRHH organization is an arm of NACURH. Additional associations may be made with campus programming groups.

== See also ==
- National Communications Coordinator
