= Residence life =

Residence Life is the comprehensive program that surrounds the experience of living "on and off campus" in a residence hall at a college or university. Residence Life is usually structured with planned events, a code of conduct and ethics, and a relatively large array of staff.

== Benefits ==
Residence Life aims to facilitate a students' transition to post-secondary. Residence halls vary in size and population however, they accommodate hundreds of young adults. Other accommodations for Residence Life and Housing are offered for family housing, Graduate/ Post-Graduate and upper-year accommodations. Traditionally, there is less traditional residence life aspects in these communities (residence assistants, programming) but residents are still offered a great deal of support from professional staff.

Residence Life is integral in the student experience at most post-secondary institutions due to a variety of benefits listed below. Overall, Residence Life aims to make residence more than a place to eat and sleep but rather, a place to explore identity and explore personal ideologies through experiences living away from home. Typically, many students live in residence at some point in their post-secondary experience. More often, this is during their first year at the institution to support the transition to campus life.

Social/Interpersonal Development: Provides an environment that is conducive to personal connections with peers. Provides an opportunity to be socialized in a new environment (campus).

Convenience and Connection on Campus: Living in residence provides the opportunity to live in close proximity to academic classrooms, faculty and campus resources. This proximity allows for students to develop community in residence and that community translates to the greater campus community.

Facilitated Social Activities (also called Programming): Hosted by professional staff or student staff, social activities are aimed to promote a sense of community and belonging in residence. This is important for residence students because of the ability to ensure students are able to effectively integrate to a post-secondary campus. Programming is aimed at student development by providing co-curricular learning experiences.

Residential Curriculum: Produced by residence life or residence education professionals, students are provided with programming with intentional learning opportunities while living in residence buildings. This curriculum is often connected to learning goals set forth by the department that reflect greater institutional goals.

Academic Success: Specific live-in staff aimed at supporting academics of residence students. Utilizing faculty and student affairs staff, students have access to specific support that is aided by student proximity to classrooms, faculty and academic resources. Residence learning communities (RLCs) (also referred to as living-learning communities (LLCs)), are targeted building areas that cluster students grouped based on academic program or interest. The purpose of these communities are to provide students additional support and faculty connections. This also allows students to easily create study groups with classmates and increased sense of belonging. Students in these communities are typically taking similar or at least one course that is the same. These students also typically see a higher GPA upon leaving residence at the end of their first year.

Safety, Security & Support: Access to residence halls is typically limited to residents living in the building, this security is maintained by strict keys and access utilizing Student ID. Other strategies in maintaining student safety include, residence student staff and professional staff that live-in to provide 24 hour on-call support. This on-call support is aimed at providing support to students who are struggling with mental wellness concerns. In addition, students are able to have direct access to campus police able to provide immediate police support.

Involvement/Leadership Opportunities: Living in residence provides students access to leadership opportunities like residence council and student staff residence roles like Resident Assistants. These roles typically fall under the Residence Life professional staff team.

Increased Intercultural Competency: Residence provides the opportunity for students to meet other students from different cultural backgrounds. Residence Life focuses on the ability to ensure equity, diversity and inclusion (EDI) is a priority by creating environments that students are able to engage in their community. This increases intercultural competence for students.

The services and support that residence life offers are impactful to the retention, academic engagement and graduation of students, more so of off-campus living or commuting.

== Organization ==
As one of three components of a college/university housing program, Residence Life is often one responsibility of a larger Housing office or department. On some campuses, however, Residence Life and Housing are responsibilities of separate departments or organizations.

Residence Life, or the department which encompasses it, usually reports to the Division of Student Affairs. However, on campuses with a separate Housing department it is not uncommon for that department to report to the Business Services or Auxiliary Services division or area as most of their responsibilities will be financial, legal, and physical (as opposed to the developmental nature of "pure" Residence Life).

Example reporting structures that could oversee an on-campus, institutionally owned, residence life operations are:

1) oversight of housing and residence life via the Vice President and/or Associate Vice-President of student affairs or student services.

2) oversight of housing and residence life via the Vice President and/or Associate Vice-President of finance, operations or administration.

3) dual oversight of the housing and residence life program. The housing operations (staffing, facilities, admissions etc.) are reported to the Vice-President Finance or an equivalent unit that oversees ancillary services. Residence life (staffing, education and programming) are reported to Vice President and/or Associate Vice-President of student affairs.

Institutions operate differently according to culture, location, organizational structure, and values- there is no ‘right’ or ‘wrong’ way to manage residence life units. Regardless of which division to which it reports, Housing departments are usually self-supporting auxiliary departments which receive little or no financial support from the college/university (i.e. tuition or fees). They are dependent on revenue from rent and cost-recovery mechanisms (damage charges, bills for services such as network or telephone service, etc.).

=== Legal Implications ===
The relationship between residence life and the students that live within are different than a landlord/tenant relationship. In Ontario, Canada, the Residential Tenancies Act exempts accommodations provided by an educational institution. The reason for this exemption is that on campus student residences are often not full calendar year rentals (duration is typically September to April) and there are student advisory groups that provide regular feedback to the residence professional staff.

== Staff ==
=== Professional staff ===
Residence Life

Residence Life professionals typically possess post-secondary degrees and in some cases have obtained a master's degree in college student personnel, higher education, counseling, or a related field. In the United States, it is more common for Residence Life professionals to obtain a master's degree in their selected field as it is usually a requirement for the role. Whereas in Canada, it is not usually a requirement to have a master's degree to be in a Residence Life professional entry-level position. Many Residence Life entry-level professionals are first introduced to the field of student affairs as students working in residence life as Resident Assistants or RAs.

Residence Life Departments are hierarchical in nature. Departments are typically over seen by a director, followed by an associate or assistant director, a manager, a coordinator and then the student-staff who have the day to day interactions with students. Depending on the size and needs of the institution there could be several coordinators managing the day to day operations of residence building(s) or one coordinator running the program. In Canada, at a university level, many residence life programs are internally run where as college campuses typically have a separate company running their residences such as a company called Campus Living Centres.

Entry-level Residence Life Professionals are often "live-in" (required to live in the residence hall on-campus, often in a larger or otherwise extraordinary space) or "live-on" (required to live in a space located on campus separate from their residence hall) to fulfill their frequent on-call duties. Some institutions are now moving to a live-off model which requires the professional staff to live in close proximity to campus as living on-campus can pose certain challenges. These challenges could include the inability to have a pet, children, or quiet enjoyment of the space meaning larger gatherings in their space may not be permitted.

Many campuses also employ graduate students, graduate assistants or entry-level professionals (most commonly with master's degrees) that directly supervise the RAs and other undergraduate staff (such as desk workers). This staff are variously referred to as Hall Directors (HDs), Resident Directors (RDs), Residence Life Coordinators (RLCs), Residence Life Area Coordinators (RLACs), and Residence Life Managers (RLMs). The titles vary between institutions with some institutions using the same title to refer to their graduate student staff that another uses for their entry-level staff.

Live-in Residence Life Professionals have a variety of responsibilities including student-staff management, conduct management, physical and mental health support, and/or project work. Student-staff management looks at supervising upper-year students who manage a floor/community in a residence building. The amount of student-staff managed depends on the building style, size, and need. These student-staff typically live on the floor with the residence students which could be first-year students, upper-year students, or graduate students. Students that live in residence are expected to follow residence policies and student-staff work to enforce those policies to keep the students safe. When these policies are violated, residence-life professionals often follow-up with those students through a conduct process. A conduct process could include meeting with the student and then assigning sanctions to those students if they are found in violation of the policy. These sanctions can be educational and take a restorative practice approach or punitive depending on the nature and severity of the incident. An educational outcome could include a reflective written piece, a workshop, or community service work. A punitive outcome could include a small or large financial penalty or as severe as residence eviction. Many Residence Life professionals are charged with overseeing a budget for programming and other residence expenses.

Residence Education

Residence Education professionals work to develop curriculum and learning opportunities for students living in residence as residence has become more than just a convenient place for students to live. Residence Education professionals work closely with the Residence Life professionals often in the same department with different functions. Roles in Residence Education could include titles such as Living-Learning Coordinators (that coordinate Living-Learning Communities that are often themed), Experiential Learning Coordinators (that oversee experiential leadership opportunities such as councils within residence halls that offer programming) and Academic Initiatives Coordinators (that craft and support the implementation of a curricular style learning plan for residents). Residence education is often rooted in an institutions residence curriculum.

- Living Learning Programs (LLP) are often a focus of Residence Education units, with the purpose of bridging the gap between in-class instruction and learning beyond the classroom. LLPs continue education outside of the classroom by providing space for faculty and students to meet and discuss content, they allow residents to network with peers with similar interests, or by providing interest based tailored programming to students to enrich their experience in Residence Halls. Living Learning Programs usually manifest as themed Living Learning Communities or Clusters, where all students who live in a certain building or on a certain residence floor share a common interest, academic major or particular coursework.
  - Non-academic themes could include:
    - Health Active Living
    - Arts & Creativity
    - Singer Songwriter
    - E-sports & Gaming
    - Outdoor Leadership
    - Women in Leadership
    - Community Outreach
    - International Students
    - Language Clusters
  - Academic or course-based themes could include:
    - Engineering
    - Science
    - Business/Entrepreneurship
    - Recreation and Leisure
    - Environmental studies
    - Health Sciences
- Experiential Learning Programs focused on leadership development in students are also a priority of Residence Education units. An example of formal Experiential Learning offered within residence halls include organizing Residence Hall Councils which provide opportunities for students to take on leadership roles within their communities to learn skills such as event planning, communication, budgeting etc.

=== Student staff ===
Residence Assistants

Typically, each residence hall also employs several Resident Assistants, or RAs within Residence Life Units. These are undergraduate or graduate students who are tasked with supporting a community of first-year or upper-year students. Resourceful RAs can use a variety of planned or spontaneous events—called programming in the field's nomenclature—to this end. They are also charged with enforcing university rules and regulations and providing general assistance to residents. RAs are often reimbursed with free or discounted room, free or discounted board, a stipend, or even all three. On most campuses, RAs receive intensive training at the beginning of the academic year. This training could include suicide awareness, mental health support, sexual assault disclosures, equity & diversity awareness, and conflict management. In addition to on-going training, some campuses have several days of training at the beginning of the second semester. If the RA encounters a situation that is outside of their training, they are able to contact the professional staff member who is on-call to help address, typically a residence hall director. These professionals are able support through crisis in case of any emergencies.

If the residence hall has a front desk or area office, it is often staffed by students who provide assistance to the residents such as accepting packages delivered to the residence hall, reporting maintenance problems, or opening doors for residents who have lost their key(s) (often for a charge).

Some Resident Assistants may also be assigned overnight duty. These on-call duties often include building rounds to ensure policies are being followed by students, responding to noise complaints, lock-outs, or any other student support. Students can access the RA on duty through a cellphone number that is building specific so the RA can respond quickly. Depending on the size of the building there can be one RA on duty or multiple. RAs are often expected to remain in the building or close to the building for the duration of their duty shift.

Residence Education Student Staff

Many Institutions also have student staff that are part of Residence Education unit that have an education based focus and help deliver the residence curriculum. For example, Wilfrid Laurier University has Residence Education Advisors (REA), and their role as student staff members is to facilitate residence-wide programming that supports academic success and professional growth of the resident students. REAs are often resources for the RAs to help connect residents to the appropriate campus or community resource throughout the year. The REAs assess the programming that is implemented and report to the Residence Hall Directors and the Academic Initiative Coordinator in order to appropriately respond to the needs of the community and assess student trends. The type of educational programming this could include:

- Time Management and Academic Organization
- Safe Substance Use
- Safe Sex and Healthy Relationships
- Diversity and Equity Education
- Career Consolation
- Academic Advising
- Healthy Eating and Sleeping Habits
