= National Communications Coordinator (higher education) =

The National Communications Coordinator (commonly referred to as NCC), within higher education is one of the essential positions on a university Residence Hall Association's executive board. The NCC is the primary means of communication between their RHA and the National Association of College and University Residence Halls (NACURH). The NCC does this by maintaining the school's affiliation status, choosing delegations to go to conferences, serving as the RHA's vote in conferences (if an affiliated member), and relaying information and networking opportunities to the RHA from NACURH. The NCC could be part of the executive board or be a member of the RHA; this is dependent on the structure of the school's RHA, and the full duties of the NCC are also dependent on the structure of the school's RHA.

Some General Responsibilities Include:

- Serve as the liaison between RHA, NACURH and the regional affiliate
- Attend and vote at regional and national conferences, in particular, NCC Business Meetings or Regional/National Boardroom Meetings
- Serve as the delegation chair for conferences
- Coordinate all aspects of forming and sending a delegation to conferences including funding, spirit and other activities
- Relay information from other NACURH member schools to the RHA
- Prepare and submit all dues and reports as requested by NACURH and the regional affiliate, including monthly newsletters to regional institutions
- Coordinate the Of the Month process (nominations and selections) in conjunction with and/or in the absence of a National Residence Hall Honorary chapter
- Serve on committees and task forces within the region or NACURH, such as It's On Us, philanthropy, spirit, legislative, or other committees as created by the regional director or NACURH chair.
- Participate in monthly/quarterly/semesterly video conference chats with other NCCs and the coordinating officer of NCCs within their region's executive board

Dependent on the structure of their RHA, NCC's may:

- Be the vice-president or member of the executive board of the RHA
- Coordinate bids submitted on behalf of the school for regional or national awards
- Recruit for delegations or RHA
- Coordinate funding for RHA or delegations to conventions

The NCC is the voting member in NACURH for the RHA and works to impact the national organization and its regional affiliate with items such as budgetary issues, legislation and voting on awards and other bids.

The NCC may be elected or hired according to their school's structure, commonly in one of the following ways:

- Elected or hired at the same time as other executive board members; typically this occurs mid-to-late spring semester
- Elected or hired in late fall or early spring semester separate from the other executive board; when this occurs, they are usually brought onto the executive board for a semester of training as the National Communications Coordinator - In Training, or NCC-IT, and attends the spring Regional Business Conference with the NCC, if affiliated with NACURH.
