= Association of College and University Housing Officers-International =

Professional association for student affairs administrators

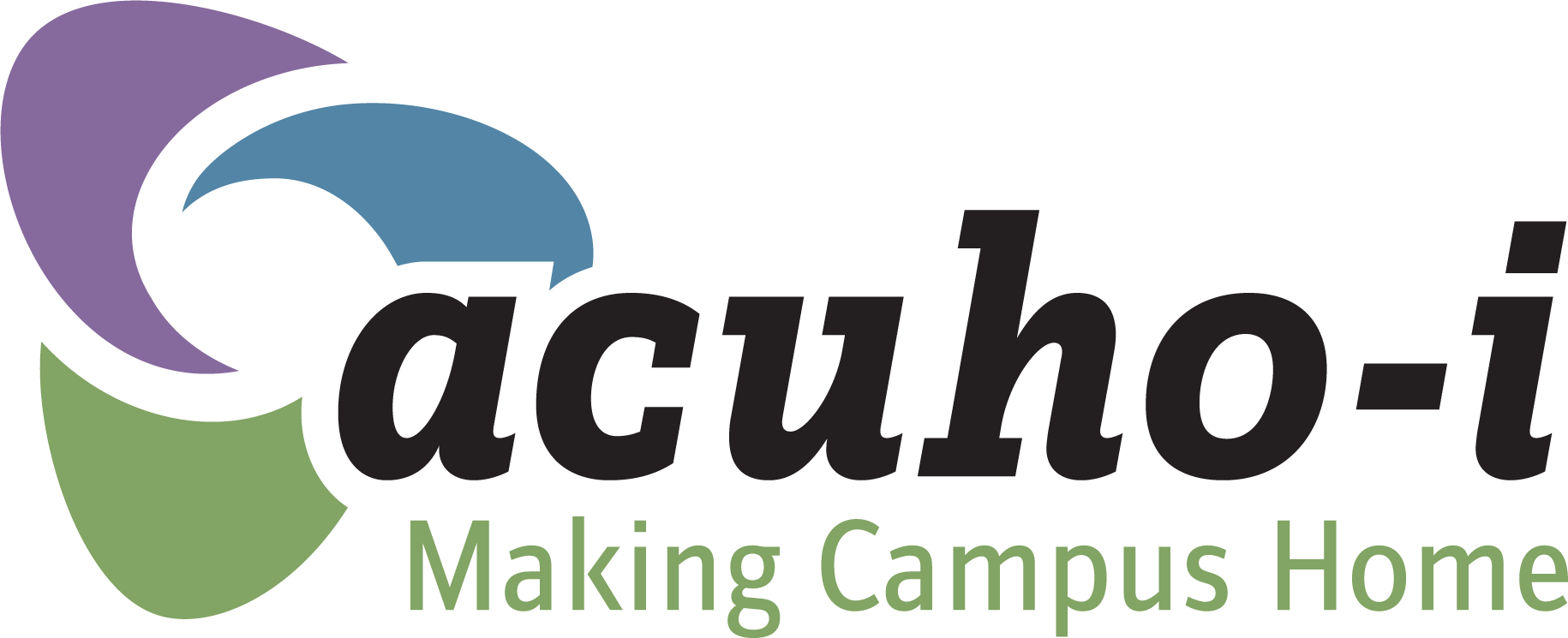
- Abbreviation: ACUHO-I
- Formation: 1951
- Founder: S. Earl Thompson
- Type: Educational association
- Headquarters: Columbus, Ohio
- Coordinates: 39.992817°N 83.002190°W
- Fields: Student affairs, college housing & residence life
- Members: 950 institutions (2017)
- CEO/Executive Director: Mary DeNiro
- President: Peter Galloway
- President-Elect: Pam Schreiber
- Staff: 21 (2020)
- Website: acuho-i.org
- Formerly called: Association of College and University Housing Officers (ACUHO) (1951-1980)

The Association of College and University Housing Officers-International (ACUHO-I) (formerly the Association of College and University Housing Officers) is a professional association for student affairs administrators who work in residence life within higher education. Founded in 1951, ACUHO-I has almost 1,000 member institutions in 16 countries. ACUHO-I's headquarters reside near the campus of Ohio State University in Columbus, Ohio, and were housed on the campus of Ohio State until 2014.

== History ==
S. Earl Thompson, then director of housing at the University of Illinois, proposed that campus housing officers from across the country should meet and invite delegates to attend a national housing conference at the University of Illinois in July 1949.

From that event grew the Association of College & University Housing Officers. Through the years more institutions joined the association, including those from countries outside the United States. Responding to expanding international membership, in 1980 "International" was added to the name of the association.

ACUHO-I established their first office on the campus of Ohio State University in 1984, later purchasing and moving into their own building immediately east of campus in Columbus, Ohio in 2014.

== Professional development ==
ACUHO-I produces several national professional development programs each year, including an annual conference, specialty conferences related to business operations and facilities, a summer graduate assistantship program, as well as various institutes and regional events.

== Publications and research ==
ACUHO-I produces two regular publications, Talking Stick magazine and the Journal of College and University Student Housing. Talking Stick is a bimonthly magazine that discusses news and developments in college housing. The Journal of College and University Student Housing is an academic and scholarly journal that examines student affairs and housing topics.

== Advocacy and public efforts ==
ACUHO-I has made public statements disagreeing with the National Labor Relations Board's decision permitting resident assistants to unionize, as well as in opposition to proposed changes to the overtime salary threshold proposed by President Barack Obama. ACUHO-I also has supported the expansion of housing options for transgender students.

ACUHO-I belongs to the Student Affairs Consortium on Government Relations, along with other student affairs associations such as American College Personnel Association, the Association for Student Conduct Administration, NASPA, and the National Intramural and Recreational Sports Association.
