= List of National Residence Hall Honorary chapters =

The National Residence Hall Honorary (NRHH) is a North American honorary society dedicated to recognizing leaders in collegiate residence halls. It was founded in 1964 at the University of Denver in Denver, Colorado. Each NRHH chapter selects its chapter name. Following is a list of the chapters of the National Residence Hall Honorary, with active chapters indicated in bold and inactive chapters in italics.

Chapter	Charter date	Institution	Location	Status	Ref.
		Adelphi University	Garden City, New York	Active	
**Alfred Valley**		Alfred State College	Alfred, New York	Active	
Sigma Tau Delta		Alvernia University	Reading, Pennsylvania	Inactive	
**The 4400 Society**		American University	Washington, D.C.	Active	
**Alpha Sigma Upsilon**		Appalachian State University	Boone, North Carolina	Active	
**Maroon and Gold**		Arizona State University	Tempe, Arizona	Active	
**Innovation**		Arizona State University Polytechnic campus	Mesa, Arizona	Active	
		Arizona State University West Valley campus	Phoenix, Arizona	Active	
**Phoenix**		Arizona State University Downtown Phoenix campus	Phoenix, Arizona	Active	
		Ashland University	Ashland, Ohio	Inactive	
**Barbara H. Fortin**		Baldwin Wallace University	Berea, Ohio	Active	
**Ruth Peters**	1978	Ball State University	Muncie, Indiana	Active	
		Baylor University	Waco, Texas	Active	
**Beloit College**		Beloit College	Beloit, Wisconsin	Active	
Rho Lambda		Binghamton University	Vestal, New York	Inactive	
**Blue Gem**		Boise State University	Boise, Idaho	Active	
**Falcon**		Bowling Green State University	Bowling Green, Ohio	Active	
**Bristaco**		Bridgewater State University	Bridgewater, Massachusetts	Active	
**Brigham Young**		Brigham Young University	Provo, Utah	Active	
		California State Polytechnic University, Pomona	Pomona, California	Active	
**California State University, Fullerton**		California State University, Fullerton	Fullerton, California	Active	
**Hornet**		California State University, Sacramento	Sacramento, California	Active	
**Donald J. Kamalsky**		Case Western Reserve University	Cleveland, Ohio	Active	
Golden Griffin	198x ?	Canisius College	Buffalo, New York	Inactive	
**Mark R. Miller**		Centenary College of Louisiana	Shreveport, Louisiana	Active	
**Julie McMahon**		Central Michigan University	Mount Pleasant, Michigan	Active	
**Tom Ogg**	2001	Central Washington University	Ellensburg, Washington	Active	
	2006	Christopher Newport University	Newport News, Virginia	Inactive	
**Alpha Sigma Psi**		Clark University	Worcester, Massachusetts	Active	
**Tony W. Cawthon**	1992	Clemson University	Clemson, South Carolina	Active	
		Colby–Sawyer College	New London, New Hampshire	Inactive	
**College of William & Mary**		College of William & Mary	Williamsburg, Virginia	Active	
**Golden Burro**		Colorado School of Mines	Golden, Colorado	Active	
**Rams**		Colorado State University	Fort Collins, Colorado	Active	
**King’s Crown**		Columbia University	New York City, New York	Active	
		Creighton University	Omaha, Nebraska	Inactive	
		Davidson College	Davidson, North Carolina	Inactive	
	196x ?	Drake University	Des Moines, Iowa	Inactive	
**Panther**		Drury University	Springfield, Missouri	Active	
**Inez Fridley**		East Carolina University	Greenville, North Carolina	Active	
Ardath E. Houser		East Stroudsburg University	East Stroudsburg, Pennsylvania	Inactive	
**Beta Upsilon Chi Sigma**	1993	East Tennessee State University	Johnson City, Tennessee	Active	
**Louis V. Hencken**		Eastern Illinois University	Charleston, Illinois	Active	
**Colonel**		Eastern Kentucky University	Richmond, Kentucky	Active	
Eagle		Eastern Michigan University	Lewiston, Maine	Inactive	
Sigma Eta		Elmira College	Elmira, New York	Inactive	
**Smith Jackson**		Elon University	Elon, North Carolina	Active	
**Rattler**		Florida A&M University	Tallahassee, Florida	Active	
**Eagle**		Florida Gulf Coast University	Fort Myers, Florida	Active	
**Golden Panther**		Florida International University, Modesto A. Maidique Campus	University Park, Florida	Active	
**Garnet and Gold**		Florida State University	Tallahassee, Florida	Active	
**Golden Plains**		Fort Hays State University	Hays, Kansas	Active	
**Campus in the Sky**		Fort Lewis College	Durango, Colorado	Active	
**Bobcats**		Frostburg State University	Frostburg, Maryland	Active	
**Capital**		George Washington University	Washington, D.C.	Active	
**Gamma Chi**		Georgia College & State University	Milledgeville, Georgia	Active	
Rho Lambda		Georgia Southwestern State University	Americus, Georgia	Inactive	
**Royal Flame**		Georgia State University	Atlanta, Georgia	Active	
**White and Gold**		Georgia Tech	Atlanta, Georgia	Active	
**Perez**		Gonzaga University	Spokane, Washington	Active	
Laker		Grand Valley State University	Allendale, Michigan	Inactive	
Rho	before March 1966	Illinois State University	Normal, Illinois	Inactive	
**Larry Miltinburger**		Indiana State University	Terre Haute, Indiana	Active	
**Great Oak**	1986	Indiana University of Pennsylvania	Indiana, Pennsylvania	Active	
**Thomas J. Hennessey**		Indiana University Bloomington	Bloomington, Indiana	Active	
**Crossroads**		Indiana University Indianapolis	Indianapolis, Indiana	Active	
**Student**		Iowa State University	Ames, Iowa	Active	
		Ithaca College	Ithaca, New York	Inactive	
**Little Apple**	1996	Kansas State University	Manhattan, Kansas	Active	
		Kearney State College	Kearney, Nebraska	Inactive	
**Black Squirrel**	196x ?	Kent State University	Kent, Ohio	Active	
Kappa Psi Alpha		Kettering University	Flint, Michigan	Inactive	
**Dr. Dennis F. Roth**		Kutztown University	Kutztown, Pennsylvania	Active	
**Red Stick**		Louisiana State University	Baton Rouge, Louisiana	Inactive	
		Loyola University Chicago	Chicago, Illinois	Inactive	
St. Joan of Arc		Marquette University	Milwaukee, Wisconsin	Inactive	
**Rho Pi Sigma**		Massachusetts College of Liberal Arts	North Adams, Massachusetts	Active	
**Dr. Richard L. Nault**	1987	Miami University	Oxford, Ohio	Active	
**Superior**		Michigan Technological University	Houghton, Michigan	Active	
	1992	Millikin University	Decatur, Illinois	Inactive	
**Maverick**		Minnesota State University, Mankato	Mankato, Minnesota	Active	
**Mu Sigma Upsilon**		Mississippi State University	Starkville, Mississippi	Active	
**Boomer**		Missouri State University	Springfield, Missouri	Active	
**Shamrock**		Missouri University of Science and Technology	Rolla, Missouri	Active	
**Eta Gamma**		Murray State University	Murray, Kentucky	Active	
Jody A. Donovan		Nebraska Wesleyan University	Lincoln, Nebraska	Inactive	
**Highlander**		New Jersey Institute of Technology	Newark, New Jersey	Active	
**Pete's Elite**		New Mexico State University	Las Cruces, New Mexico	Active	
**Torch**	2004	New York University	New York City, New York	Active	
**Biggers-Wilder**		North Carolina Central University	Durham, North Carolina	Active	
**North Carolina State University**		North Carolina State University	Raleigh, North Carolina	Active	
**Bison**		North Dakota State University	Fargo, North Dakota	Active	
Alpha Mu Omega	198x ?	Northeastern State University	Tahlequah, Oklahoma	Inactive	
**Dr. Neil Potter**		Northern Arizona University	Flagstaff, Arizona	Active	
	198x ?	Northern Illinois University	DeKalb, Illinois	Inactive	
**Arboretum**		Northwest Missouri State University	Maryville, Missouri	Active	
**Golden Grizzlies**		Oakland University, Main Campus	Rochester, Michigan	Active	
**Buckeye**		Ohio State University	Columbus, Ohio	Active	
**Dr. Jim Sand**		Ohio University	Athens, Ohio	Active	
**Oklahoma State**		Oklahoma State University	Stillwater, Oklahoma	Active	
**Laura Bennet Beaver**		Oregon State University	Corvallis, Oregon	Active	
		Pace University	New York City, New York	Inactive	
Joseph DeFeo		Pennsylvania College of Technology	Williamsport, Pennsylvania	Inactive	
**Nittany**		Pennsylvania State University	University Park, Pennsylvania	Active	
**Jungle**		Pittsburg State University	Pittsburg, Kansas	Active	
**Boilermaker**		Purdue University	West Lafayette, Indiana	Active	
**Rho Eta Lambda**		Radford University	Radford, Virginia	Active	
**Scarlet Knights**		Rutgers University–New Brunswick	New Brunswick, New Jersey	Active	
		Sacred Heart University	Fairfield, Connecticut	Active	
**Olivia A. Lake**		Saginaw Valley State University	University Center, Michigan	Active	
		St. Cloud State University	St. Cloud, Minnesota	Inactive	
**Ignite**		Saint Louis University	St. Louis, Missouri	Active	
**Saint Benedict on a Hill**		Saint Martin's University	Lacey, Washington	Active	
**San Diego State University**		San Diego State University	San Diego, California	Active	
	196x ?	San Jose State College	San Jose, California	Inactive	
**Anchor**		Shippensburg University	Shippensburg, Pennsylvania	Active	
**Emerald Pride**		Slippery Rock University	Slippery Rock, Pennsylvania	Active	
**Sheila E. Pinkney**		Southeast Missouri State University	Cape Girardeau, Missouri	Active	
Phi Delta	198x ?	Southern Arkansas University	Magnolia, Arkansas	Inactive	
**Red Storm**		Southern Illinois University Edwardsville	Edwardsville, Illinois	Active	
		Southern Oregon University	Ashland, Oregon	Active	
**SUNY Dehli**		State University of New York at Delhi	Delhi, New York	Active	
**Phi Psi**	1986	State University of New York at New Paltz	New Paltz, New York	Active	
**Edward K. Griesmer**		State University of New York at Oneonta	Oneonta, New York	Active	
**Castle Point**		Stevens Institute of Technology	Hoboken, New Jersey	Active	
**Wolfpack**		Stony Brook University	Stony Brook, New York	Active	
Kristen Pierce		Stonehill College	Easton, Massachusetts	Inactive	
		Syracuse University	Syracuse, New York	Inactive	
**Temple University**		Temple University	Philadelphia, Pennsylvania	Active	
**Dan Mizer**	1984	Texas A&M University	College Station, Texas	Active	
**Tech**		Texas Tech University	Lubbock, Texas	Active	
**Golden Tiger**		Towson University	Towson, Maryland	Active	
**Bess Truman**	1982	Truman State University	Kirksville, Missouri	Active	(Note: Chapter formed at Northeast Missouri State University, now Truman State University.)
**Magnolia**		Tulane University	New Orleans, Louisiana	Active	
**Charger Blue**		University of Alabama in Huntsville	Huntsville, Alabama	Active	
**Richard L. Hansford**		University of Akron	Akron, Ohio	Active	
**Omega Eta Lambda**		University of Arizona	Tucson, Arizona	Active	
**Tau Alpha Epsilon**		University of Arkansas	Fayetteville, Arkansas	Active	
**Thunderbird**		University of British Columbia	Vancouver, British Columbia, Canada	Active	
**Mary Gallivan**		University at Buffalo	Buffalo, New York	Active	
**University of California, Berkeley**		University of California, Berkeley	Berkeley, California	Active	
**Anteater**		University of California, Irvine	Irvine, California	Active	
**University of California, Los Angeles**		University of California, Los Angeles	Los Angeles, California	Active	
**Highlander**		University of California, Riverside	Riverside, California	Active	
**Sheila Ryan**		University of California, San Diego	San Diego, California	Active	
**Margaret T. Getman**		University of California, Santa Barbara	Santa Barbara, California	Active	
**University of Central Arkansas**		University of Central Arkansas	Conway, Arkansas	Active	
**Pegasus**		University of Central Florida	Orlando, Florida	Active	
**STAR**		University of Central Missouri	Warrensburg, Missouri	Active	
**Queen City**		University of Cincinnati	Cincinnati, Ohio	Active	
**Golden Buffalo**		University of Colorado Boulder	Boulder, Colorado	Active	
**Husky**		University of Connecticut	Storrs, Connecticut	Active	
		University of Denver	Denver, Colorado	Inactive	
**James C. Grimm**	1981	University of Florida	Gainesville, Florida	Active	
**Georgia Alpha**		University of Georgia	Athens, Georgia	Active	
**Kau I Ka Hano**		University of Hawaiʻi at Mānoa	Honolulu, Hawaii	Active	
**Lalia Machado**	2015	University of Houston	Houston, Texas	Active	
**Vandal**	1990	University of Idaho	Moscow, Idaho	Active	
**Eternal Flames**		University of Illinois Chicago	Chicago, Illinois	Active	
**Orange and Blue Illini**	1982	University of Illinois Urbana-Champaign	Champaign, Illinois	Active	
**Hawkeye**		University of Iowa	Iowa City, Iowa	Active	
**Kenneth L. Stoner**	196x ?	University of Kansas	Lawrence, Kansas	Active	
**Cardinal**		University of Louisville	Louisville, Kentucky	Active	
**University of Maryland,Baltimore County**		University of Maryland, Baltimore County	Catonsville, Maryland	Active	
**Jim Henson**	196x ?	University of Maryland, College Park	College Park, Maryland	Active	(Note: Chapter was originally named Shahrum and was then called the Mu Delta chapter.)
**University of Massachusetts** **Amherst**		University of Massachusetts Amherst	Amherst, Massachusetts	Active	
**Lowell Mill City**		University of Massachusetts Lowell	Lowell, Massachusetts	Active	
**University of Missouri**	1987	University of Missouri	Columbia, Missouri	Active	
**Big Blue**		University of Nebraska at Kearney	Kearney, Nebraska	Active	
**Scarlet and Cream**	1989	University of Nebraska–Lincoln	Lincoln, Nebraska	Active	
		University of Nevada, Las Vegas	Paradise, Nevada	Inactive	
**Blue and Gold**		University of New Haven	West Haven, Connecticut	Active	
**Cherry and Silver**		University of New Mexico	Albuquerque, New Mexico	Active	
**Society of Janus**		University of North Carolina at Chapel Hill	Chapel Hill, North Carolina	Active	
**Charlotte**		University of North Carolina at Charlotte	Charlotte, North Carolina	Active	
**Kappa Gamma Mu**		University of North Carolina at Greensboro	Greensboro, North Carolina	Active	
**Psi Phi**		University of North Carolina Wilmington	Wilmington, North Carolina	Active	
**Mark Hudson**		University of North Dakota	Grand Forks, North Dakota	Active	
		University of North Texas	Denton, Texas	Inactive	
		University of Northern Colorado	Greeley, Colorado	Active	
**Panther Pride**		University of Northern Iowa	Cedar Falls, Iowa	Active	
**David F. Schrage**		University of Oklahoma	Norman, Oklahoma	Active	
**University of Oregon**		University of Oregon	Eugene, Oregon	Active	
**Jonas Salk**		University of Pittsburgh	Pittsburgh, Pennsylvania	Active	
**Palmetto**		University of South Carolina	Columbia, South Carolina	Active	
**Green and Gold**		University of South Florida	Tampa, Florida	Active	
**Rho Eta Alpha**	1988	University of Southern Mississippi	Hattiesburg, Mississippi	Active	
**Volunteer**		University of Tennessee	Knoxville, Tennessee	Active	
**Dr. Floyd B. Hoelting**		University of Texas at Austin	Austin, Texas	Active	
**Comet**		University of Texas at Dallas	Richardson, Texas	Active	
**Swoop**		University of Utah	Salt Lake City, Utah	Active	
**University of Virginia**		University of Virginia	Charlottesville, Virginia	Active	
		University of West Florida	Pensacola, Florida	Active	
F.L.A.M.E.		University of West Georgia	Carrollton, Georgia	Inactive	(Note: The chapter's name, F.L.A.M.E., stood for Forming Leaders and Mentors Everywhere.)
	198x ?	University of Wisconsin–Eau Claire	Eau Claire, Wisconsin	Inactive	
**Phoenix Flame**		University of Wisconsin–Green Bay	Green Bay, Wisconsin	Active	
**Carol Bassuener**		University of Wisconsin–La Crosse	La Crosse, Wisconsin	Active	
		University of Wisconsin–Oshkosh	Oshkosh, Wisconsin	Inactive	
**Pioneer**		University of Wisconsin–Platteville	Platteville, Wisconsin	Active	
**University of Wisconsin–Stevens Point**	1983	University of Wisconsin–Stevens Point	Stevens Point, Wisconsin	Active	
	196x ?	University of Wisconsin–Stout	Menomonie, Wisconsin	Inactive	
Linda Long-Howat	1978	University of Wisconsin–Whitewater	Whitewater, Wisconsin	Inactive	
	197x ?	University of Wyoming	Laramie, Wyoming	Inactive	
**Aggie Blue**		Utah State University	Logan, Utah	Active	
		Valparaiso University	Valparaiso, Indiana	Inactive	
		Virginia Tech	Blacksburg, Virginia	Inactive	
**Crimson and Grey**		Washington State University	Pullman, Washington	Active	
**Luminescence**		Washington University in St. Louis	St. Louis, Missouri	Active	
Omega Chi Upsilon		Western Carolina University	Cullowhee, North Carolina	Inactive	
**Carolyn Grote**	198x ?	Western Illinois University	Macomb, Illinois	Active	
**Wolf**		Western Oregon University	Monmouth, Oregon	Active	
**Western Washington**		Western Washington University	Bellingham, Washington	Active	
**IPPI**		Winona State University	Winona, Minnesota	Active	
**Winston-Salem State**		Winston-Salem State University	Winston-Salem, North Carolina	Active	
John JT Timmons		Winthrop University	Rock Hill, South Carolina	Inactive	
**Wright**	1986	Wright State University	Fairborn, Ohio	Active	
