= CSCOPE (education) =

K-12 educational curriculum support system

CSCOPE is a K-12 educational curriculum support system that has been widely adopted in Texas. It was created by the Texas Education Service Center Curriculum Collaborative (TESCCC).

== Use ==
Nineteen out of twenty education regions in Texas have districts that use CSCOPE, and as of January 2, 2011 there were 747 school districts (out of 1,051 total) using it.

== Reactions ==
While popular with district administrators, CSCOPE has elicited mixed reactions from teachers, some of whom feel excessively constrained by a set timetable for lessons. Other teachers, however, feel that CSCOPE is appreciated by the students and has improved classroom performance and attendance. Some say that CSCOPE will better help prepare districts for the next generation of standardized tests in Texas, such as the State of Texas Assessments of Academic Readiness test.

The system is a product of an increased emphasis on accountability in public education over the last two decades.

== Upcoming changes ==
In 2013, after complaints about parents' inability to access the curriculum as well as about lesson plans, Texas announced significant changes would be made to the system. These changes include:

- Making all meetings of the governing board public, and meeting all the respective notice requirements.
- A joint review process of all CSCOPE lessons, beginning with Social Studies.
- Removing civil or criminal penalties associated with the release of CSCOPE content.
- Allowing teachers to post any and all CSCOPE lessons that they deem necessary.
- Creating a standing curriculum review panel composed of parents, teachers, and school administrators.
