= National Association of College and University Residence Halls =

Organization

National Association of College and University Residence Halls (NACURH)
- Founded: 1954
- Type: Student Organization
- Purpose: College Residential Life
- Origins: Midwest Dormitory Conference, 1954
- Region served: United States of America, Canada, Mexico, and The Bahamas
- Method: Chapter affiliation, information sharing, conference hosting
- NACURH Chairperson and CEO: Morgan Lakey
- NACURH Associate for Operations and CFO: Nathan Lilla
- Website: https://nacurh.org

The National Association of College and University Residence Halls Incorporated (NACURH) is an international organization made up of eight regions. The eight regions cover the entire United States and parts of Canada. Previously it has also covered parts of Mexico and The Bahamas. NACURH brings together students who live in residence halls on college campuses to share ideas, resources, and best practices in order to improve their residential communities.

== Mission and vision ==
=== Mission ===
"As an organization, NACURH creates environments that empower, motivate, and equip residence hall leaders by providing them with skills and resources in order for them to excel and positively impact their campus communities. ."

=== Vision ===
"The National Association of College and University Residence Halls, NACURH Incorporated, seeks to create a network of civically engaged students sharing common experiences through residential leadership opportunities."

== History ==
In 1954, Iowa State University, the University of Colorado, the University of Missouri and the University of Northern Iowa formed the Midwest Dormitory Conference. The conference was the brainchild of Iowa State's Student Residence Hall Government, which felt that such an organization was needed to encourage the exchange of ideas and information. All four schools sent delegations to the first conference, which was held in the same year. In 1955, the name of the group was changed to the Association of College and University Residence Halls (ACURH). By 1957, the organization had expanded to 11 institutional members.

A similar organization, the Inter-Mountain Residence Hall Association (IMRHA), merged with ACURH in 1961, necessitating a name change to the National Association of College and University Residence Halls (NACURH). The association was split into two "associate" regions, the Midwest Association (MACURH) and the Inter-Mountain Association (IACURH), based on the two original groups. By 1963, the organization had expanded to 26 institutional members.

In 1964, the Pacific Association (PACURH), the North Atlantic Association (NAACURH) and the South Atlantic Association (SAACURH) were all created "on paper" to allow for possible future growth of the organization. In this same year, the National Residence Hall Honorary was also created by NACURH. By 1963, the organization had expanded to 41 institutional members.

In 1968, the Great Lakes Region (GLACURH) was split from the Midwest Association of NACURH, bringing the number of regions to six. By this time, 130 schools were officially affiliated with NACURH, tripling the number of members from 1967. NACURH's mailing list also officially included member schools or contacts in all fifty states, plus several Canadian schools. The National Information Center (NIC) was also created in 1968.

In 1971, NACURH incorporated as a 501(c)(3) non-profit under Oklahoma law, granting the organization and its associate regions non-profit incorporation. This change in tax status meant that the regional associations became regional affiliates.

In 1980, the Midwest Affiliate was again split between the new Southwest Affiliate (SWACURH) and the Midwest Affiliate. This brought the total number of affiliate regions to seven. Institutional membership had also increased to 135.

In 1991 the North Atlantic Affiliate was split wholly to form two new regions for NACURH, the Central Atlantic (CAACURH) and the North Eastern (NEACURH) regions. This brought the total number of affiliate regions to eight, the current number. Additionally, the 1991 conference held at Arizona State University was record-breaking in terms of the number of delegates present, at 2,188.

In 1997, NACURH and its Affiliates gained tax-exempt status.

In 2016, NACURH Executives passed an amendment to the NACURH Policy Books. This amendment would un-affiliate NACURH from the various state associations/organizations/groups that existed around the country. In doing so, it was decided that NACURH and its affiliates would not fund, participate, coordinate, recognize, set aside time for state business, or conduct business with state level associations, groups and organizations or similar. As well, NACURH would prohibit state level associations and organizations from receiving benefits and services from corporate partners and sponsors. Furthermore, NRHH would no longer provide their benefits and services to state level associations and organizations.

At the 2019 annual business meeting, many regions voted to strike international affiliates from their regional charters. This decision was made due to the fact that though many regions claim to represent various international affiliates, many regions have not had any international colleges/universities affiliated in the past 3 years+. Regions with currently active/affiliated international colleges/universities would be allowed to keep these affiliates in their charters. Any international colleges/universities that may wish to affiliate with NACURH whose state/province/country is not explicitly stated in any region's charter, may apply for affiliate membership and then discuss with NACURH Executives to find which region would be the best fit for them.

In 2020, due to the COVID-19 pandemic, NACURH hosted its first-ever entirely virtual annual conference. The conference was planned to be hosted at University of Dayton which was then moved to be entirely virtual for fears of the spreading virus impacting those attending the conference from all around the country.

== Strategic planning ==
In 2014 through 2015, NACURH formed a strategic planning commission led by members of the Boards of Directors per a resolution passed in May 2014. The purpose of the NACURH Strategic Plan is to provide a clear direction for the future of the organization and company. With a clear direction, NACURH commits itself to providing residence hall leaders with skills and resources that they need in order to excel and positively impact their campus communities. This group performed the NACURH Services and Performance Assessment (NSPA) on the corporation as a whole, and, as a result, created a strategic plan for years 2015–2018. The new plan outlines necessary steps to improve NACURH and the way it serves member schools.

Throughout the 2023-2024 affiliation year, a new Strategic Planning Committee was formed, and at the 2024 Annual Business Meeting the NACURH Board of Directors voted to confirm a new 2024-2027 NACURH Strategic Plan. This plan is composed of five focus areas covering a variety of educational and growth components, as well as promoting adaptability and forward thought.

== NACURH offices ==
=== NACURH Information Centre (NIC) (1967–2017) ===
Created in 1968, The NIC was the business office of NACURH, Inc. The NIC's projects and responsibilities included: Maintaining the Resource File Index, updating and maintaining the national website, and keeping records of the dues of member schools. The NIC was merged with the NSRO to form the NCO following the close of the 2017 Annual Conference.

=== NACURH Services and Recognition Office (NSRO) (2007–2017) ===
The NSRO was created in 2007 when it succeeded the NRHH office. The NSRO Office was the services office of NACURH, Inc. and served as a support office for NACURH. The NSRO was created to provide non-technical services to NACURH and its member schools. The NSRO was charged with creating and selling merchandise (pins, apparel, etc.) and creating and maintaining special national projects and developing other services for NACURH, Inc. as needed. The NSRO was merged with the NIC to form the NCO following the close of the 2017 Annual Conference.

=== NACURH Corporate Office (NCO) (2017-2026) ===
During the NACURH 2016 Annual Conference, Boardroom Representatives voted to combine the NIC and the NSRO into the NACURH Corporate Office (NCO). The NACURH Corporate Office (NCO) serves as the Corporate Headquarters for NACURH, and is the central contact point for all correspondence. The NCO takes on the combined responsibilities of the former NSRO and NIC. Like other branches of NACURH, the NCO is entirely student-run by volunteer staff members from the host institution. The NCO was hosted at The University of Delaware.

During the 2019-2020 affiliation year, it was determined that ACUHO-I, the professional international organization for College and University Housing Staff would become the permanent hosts of the NACURH Corporate Office and would manage the customer service aspects of hosting the office.

During the 2022-2023 affiliation year, it was determined that ACUHO-I would no longer host the NACURH Corporate Office, and beginning in the 2023-2024 affiliation year, Kent State University began as the host institution for the Corporate Office. The new NACURH Corporate Office requires that the Director for Merchandise and Operations, AD for Administration and Finance, as well as two (2) additional AD positions be filled by students at the Host institution, alongside one advisor. The rest are selected from any NACURH affiliated institution in good standing.

In the 2024-2025 affiliation year, Kent State University was unable to continue being the host institution for the Corporate Office. After a few months of a vacancy, there was no interest in hosting the Corporate Office, so the NACURH Executive Committee chose to remain vacant for the rest of the affiliation, pending legislation to make the Corporate Office virtual, which passed effective the 2025-2026 affiliation year.

As of 2025-2026 affiliation year, the Corporate Office is now entirely virtual.

During the NACURH 2026 Annual Conference, both the NACURH Board of Directors and Boardroom Representatives voted to dissolve the NACURH Corporate Office. It was decided that the responsibilities of the NCO have been redistributed into two portions on the NACURH Executive Committee, the NACURH Associate for Administration (NAA), and NACURH Associate for Programs (NAP).

== Regions ==
Regions of NACURH in North America: Pacific (PACURH) Intermountain (IACURH) Midwest (MACURH) Southwest (SWACURH) Great Lakes (GLACURH) South Atlantic (SAACURH) Central Atlantic (CAACURH) North East (NEACURH)

=== CAACURH ===
The Central Atlantic Affiliate of College and University Residence Halls is made up of Delaware, Maryland, New Jersey, Ohio, Pennsylvania, Washington, D.C., and West Virginia. Prior to 1991 this region was part of NAACURH.

=== GLACURH ===
The Great Lakes Affiliate of College and University Residence Halls is made up of Illinois, Indiana, Michigan, Wisconsin, and Ontario, Canada. It was broken off from MACURH in 1968.

=== IACURH ===
The Intermountain Affiliate of College and University Residence Halls is made up of Arizona, Colorado, Idaho, Montana, New Mexico, Nevada, Utah, Wyoming, Alberta, Canada, and Saskatchewan, Canada. IACURH was formed from the Inter-Mountain Residence Hall Association, which merged with the original Midwest Dormitory Conference to form NACURH (then ACURH).

=== MACURH ===
The Midwest Affiliate of College and University Residence Halls is composed of Iowa, Kansas, Minnesota, Missouri, Nebraska, North Dakota, and South Dakota. MACURH was formed from the original Midwest Dormitory Conference, which led to the formation of NACURH.

=== NEACURH ===
The North East Affiliate of College and University Residence Halls is made up of Connecticut, Maine, Massachusetts, New Hampshire, New York, Rhode Island, and Vermont. Prior to 1990, this area was part of NAACURH.

=== PACURH ===
The Pacific Affiliate of College and University Residence Halls is made up of Alaska, California, Hawaii, Oregon, Washington, and British Columbia. PACURH was initially formed in 1964. For 4 years (starting in 1975) PACURH split into two regions, the Pacific Northwest Affiliate (PNACURH) and the Southern Pacific Affiliate (SPACURH). In 1979, PNACURH and SPACURH merged back into one region, PACURH

=== SAACURH ===
The South Atlantic Affiliate of College and University Residence Halls is composed of Alabama, Florida, Georgia, Kentucky, Mississippi, North and South Carolina, Tennessee, Virginia and the Bahamas. It was formed in 1964.

=== SWACURH ===
The Southwest Affiliate of College and University Residence Halls is made up of schools in Arkansas, Louisiana, Oklahoma, Texas, and Mexico. It was broken off from MACURH as its own region in 1980.

== Annual Conference ==
Each year a school is selected to host the following year's annual conference (also referred to as NACURH Conference).

=== Past conference hosts ===
Number of NACURH Annual Conferences held by state, including the 2022 conference. Key: 7 conferences held 6 conferences held 5 conferences held 4 conferences held 3 conferences held 2 conferences held 1 conferences held 0 conferences held

- 1954 - Iowa State University
- 1955 - University of Missouri
- 1956 - University of Colorado Boulder
- 1957 - University of Nebraska–Lincoln
- 1958 - Iowa State University
- 1959 - University of Missouri
- 1960 - Southern Illinois University Carbondale
- 1961 - Oklahoma State University
- 1962 - Montana State University
- 1963 - University of Arizona
- 1964 - University of Denver
- 1965 - Washington State University
- 1966 - Southern Illinois University Carbondale
- 1967 - University of Kansas
- 1968 - Pennsylvania State University
- 1969 - California State University, Long Beach
- 1970 - Texas Tech University
- 1971 - Oklahoma State University
- 1972 - University of Wisconsin–Stevens Point
- 1973 - University of Delaware
- 1974 - Illinois State University
- 1975 - University of Wisconsin–Stevens Point
- 1976 - Mississippi State University
- 1977 - Oklahoma State University
- 1978 - Ball State University
- 1979 - Kansas State University
- 1980 - University of North Carolina - Chapel Hill
- 1981 - Texas A&M University
- 1982 - University of Wisconsin–Whitewater
- 1983 - Pennsylvania State University
- 1984 - University of Colorado Boulder
- 1985 - University of Florida
- 1986 - University of San Francisco
- 1987 - Central Michigan University
- 1988 - University of Wisconsin–La Crosse
- 1989 - University of Northern Colorado with Colorado State University
- 1990 - Southwest Missouri State University
- 1991 - Arizona State University
- 1992 - University of North Dakota
- 1993 - University of South Carolina
- 1994 - Northern Arizona University with New Mexico State University
- 1995 - Virginia Polytechnic Institute and State University (Virginia Tech)
- 1996 - University of Oklahoma
- 1997 - Ball State University
- 1998 - University of Nebraska–Lincoln
- 1999 - University of Wisconsin–La Crosse
- 2000 - University of Colorado Boulder
- 2001 - University of Southern California
- 2002 - University of Minnesota
- 2003 - North Carolina State University
- 2004 - Saint Louis University
- 2005 - Syracuse University
- 2006 - University of California, Berkeley
- 2007 - University of Wisconsin–Oshkosh
- 2008 - Oklahoma State University
- 2009 - University of Arizona
- 2010 - University of California, San Diego
- 2011 - Western Illinois University
- 2012 - University of Colorado Boulder
- 2013 - University of Pittsburgh
- 2014 - University of Wisconsin–Eau Claire
- 2015 - North Dakota State University
- 2016 - University of Delaware
- 2017 - Purdue University
- 2018 - Arizona State University-Tempe
- 2019 - Louisiana State University
- 2020 - University of Dayton*
- 2021 - Hosted by Committee
- 2022 - Southern Oregon University
- 2023 - Ball State University
- 2024 - New Mexico State University
- 2025 - Illinois State University
- 2026 - Texas A&M University

=== Awards ===
At each annual conference, the following awards are given out:

- NACURH Distinguished Service Award
- NACURH First Year Experience Award
- NACURH Hallenbeck Lifetime Service Award
- Outstanding NRHH Member of the Year Award
- NACURH NCC of the Year Award
- NACURH RHA President of the Year Award
- NRHH President of the Year Award
- NACURH Student of the Year Award
- NACURH Valerie Averill Advisor of the Year Award
- NACURH Outstanding Advocacy Initiative of the Year
- NACURH RHA Building Block of the Year
- NACURH School of the Year Award
- NRHH Building Block Chapter of the Year
- NRHH Outstanding Chapter of the Year

== Mascots ==
Some regions have mascots, which make frequent appearances on T-shirts at national conferences and elsewhere.

- NEACURH: Marty the Moose and Trina the Tree
- IACURH: Summit the Stegosaurus and the Rocky Mountains. The original mascot of Funk E. Monkey was changed to a Monarch Butterfly in early 2020 before being ultimately removed.
- PACURH: Jeremiah T. Frog
- SWACURH: MALTO the Duck and TALOM the Tractor
- CAACURH: Campbell the Cougar
- SAACURH: Louie the Lion
- MACURH: Molly the Moo-Cow
- GLACURH: MOWII the Polar Bear and HOMES the Oar
- NACURH Executive Committee: Tobey Terrance Turtle

== The Advancement Society ==
In January, 1982, the NACURH National Board of Directors (NBD) approved a resolution authorizing a NACURH alumni association. This brochure was designed to introduce the "Association of Alumni and Friends of NACURH" to the general membership.

At the Semi-Annual Business Meeting 2016 the NACURH Board of Directors transitioned the Association of Alumni and Friends of NACURH (AAFN) to the Advancement Society. Creating new tiers and recognizing individuals who support NACURH. They also established a purpose: The purpose of the Advancement Society is to establish and recognize those who make individual monetary contributions to NACURH, Inc., providing an avenue to recognize others for their leadership in NACURH by donating on their behalf and generating interest money to support NACURH leadership development, recognition, scholarships, grants, honorariums and general financial support. And further listed the primary benefit of the Advancement Society is to provide contributors with recognition of their support. NACURH will solicit the individual's name, institution, permanent email address, years of involvement and short summary of involvement.

== Leadership ==
The NACURH Executive Committee serves as the C-suite and Executive Leadership of NACURH. The following are the NACURH Executives for the 2026–27 affiliation year:

Name	Position	Host Institution
Morgan Lakey	NACURH Chairperson	University of Alabama Huntsville
Nathan Lilla	NACURH Associate for Operations	University of Nebraska at Kearney
Carson Markovic	NACURH Associate for Administration	University of Kansas
Riddhi Patel	NACURH Associate for NRHH	Texas Tech University
Damien Davis	NACURH Associate for Engagement	Saint Louis University
Kiara Wisniewski	NACURH Associate for Programming	University at Buffalo
Scott Cooke	NACURH Advisor	Texas State University
Patrick Rosengrant	NACURH NRHH Advisor	Chestnut Hill College

== Consultants ==
The NACURH Consultants serve as consultants to the NACURH Executive Committee.

Name	Position	Host Institution
Bethany Stafford	Conference Resource Consultant	Washington University in St. Louis
Rick Cazzato Jr.	ART (Advisor Retention & Training) Consultant	Northwestern University
Cassandra Weston	Alumni & Development Consultant	Connecticut Science Center
Matt Morrissey	Outreach & Relations Consultant	University of Massachusetts at Amherst

== See also ==
- National Residence Hall Honorary
- National Communications Coordinator
