= Residential fellow =

In American higher education, a residential fellow usually refers to a paid administrator who supervises a given "area" of a campus residential system. The RF is responsible for, among other things, the residence assistants under his or her jurisdiction, and serves as the true liaison between residents and the administration. RFs often hold judgmental power over grievances or violations with the school's policies, and hand out fines to students who have been documented.

== Examples ==
At Georgetown University, resident fellows are graduate students, and have a role similar to an undergraduate resident assistant.

At Stanford University, resident fellows are faculty who live on campus.
