= Curriculum =

Educational plan

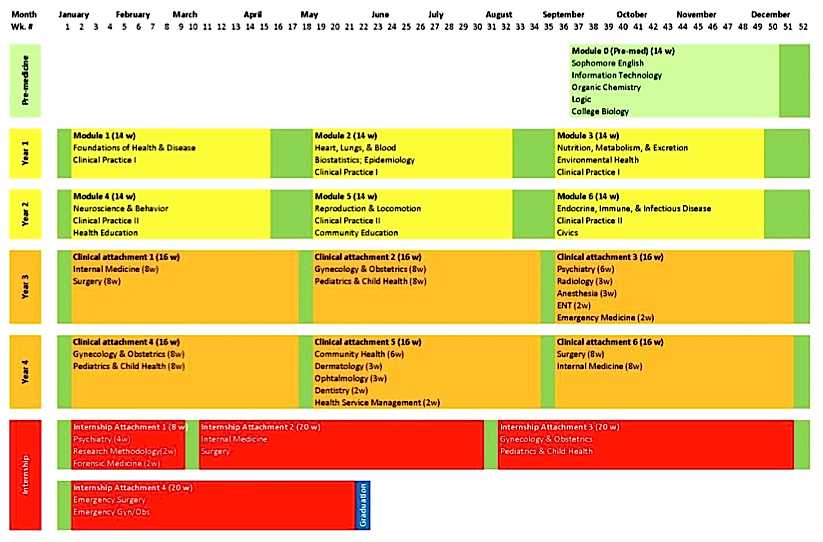
A 52-week curriculum for a medical school, showing the courses for the different levels

In education, a curriculum (/kəˈrɪkjʊləm/; pl.: curriculums or curricula /kəˈrɪkjʊlə/) is the totality of student experiences that occur in an educational process. The term often refers specifically to a planned sequence of instruction, or to a view of the student's experiences in terms of the educator's or school's instructional goals. A curriculum may incorporate the planned interaction of pupils with instructional content, materials, resources, and processes for evaluating the attainment of educational objectives. Curricula are split into several categories: the explicit, the implicit (including the hidden), the excluded, and the extracurricular.

Curricula may be tightly standardized or may include a high level of instructor or learner autonomy. Many countries have national curricula in primary and secondary education, such as the United Kingdom's National Curriculum.

UNESCO's International Bureau of Education has the primary mission of studying curricula and their implementation worldwide.

== Etymology ==
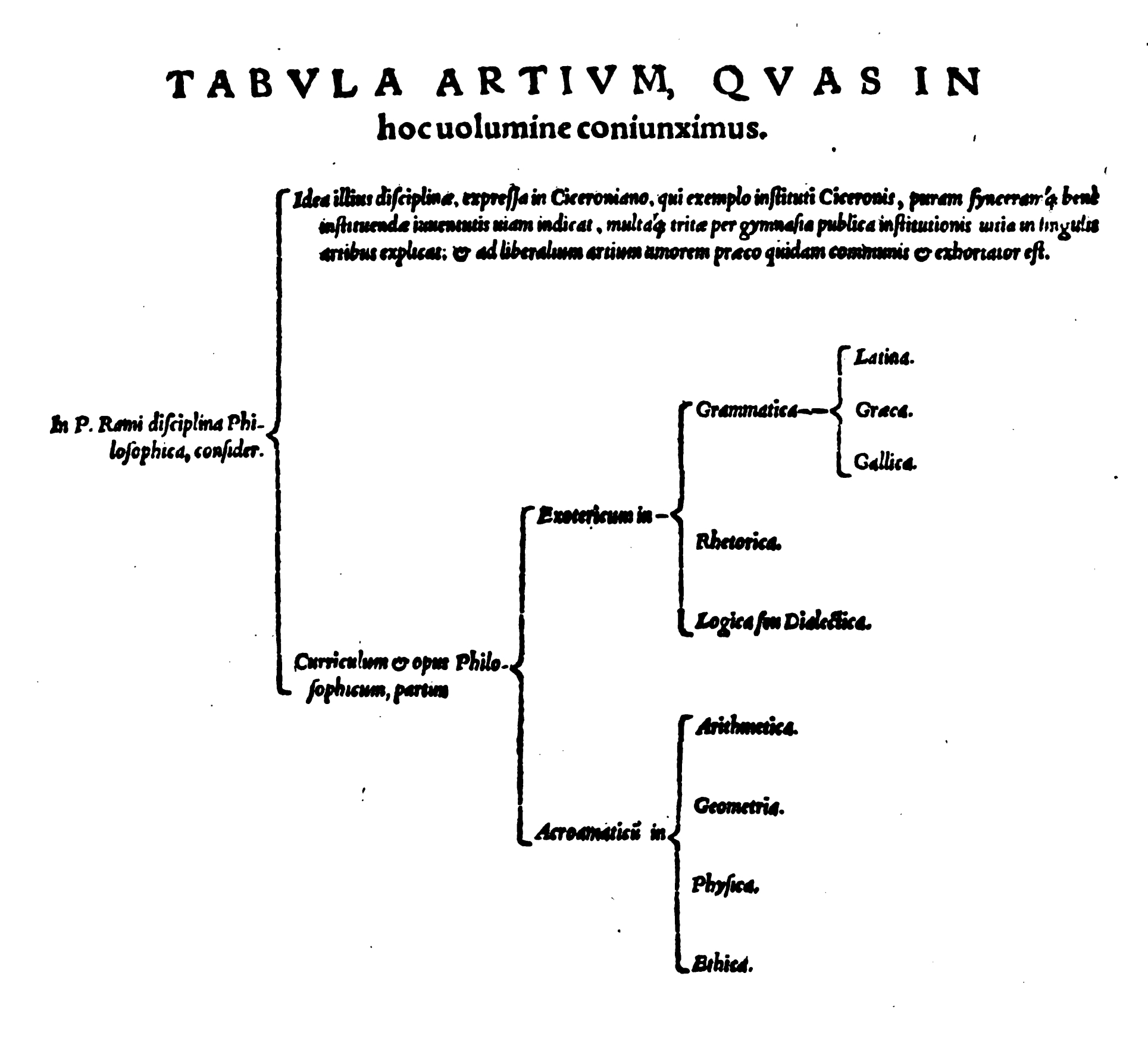
First published use of "curriculum" in 1576

The English "curriculum" began is a loanword from the Latin curriculum, curriculi which means "a race" or "the course of a race" (which in turn derives from the verb currere meaning "to run/to proceed"). The word is "from a Modern Latin transferred use of classical Latin curriculum "a running, course, career" (also "a fast chariot, racing car"), from currere "to run" (from PIE root *kers- "to run")." The first known use in an educational context is in the Professio Regia, a work by University of Paris professor Petrus Ramus published posthumously in 1576. The term subsequently appears in University of Leiden records in 1582. The word's origins appear closely linked to the Calvinist desire to bring greater order to education.

By the seventeenth century, the University of Glasgow also referred to its "course" of study as a "curriculum", producing the first known use of the term in English in 1633. By the nineteenth century, European universities routinely referred to their curriculum to describe both the complete course of study (as for a degree in surgery) and particular courses and their content. By 1824, the word was defined as "a course, especially a fixed course of study at a college, university, or school."

== Definitions and interpretations ==
=== Professional interpretations ===
There is no generally agreed upon definition of curriculum. There various definitions that describe the term.

Through the work of Dewey, Kelly, Smith, and Eisner, four types of curricula could be defined as:

- Explicit curriculum: subjects that will be taught, the identified "mission" of the school, and the knowledge and skills that the school expects successful students to acquire.
- Implicit curriculum: lessons that arise from the culture of the school and the behaviors, attitudes, and expectations that characterize that culture, the unintended curriculum.
- Hidden curriculum: things which students learn, 'because of the way in which the work of the school is planned and organized but which are not in themselves overtly included in the planning or even in the consciousness of those responsible for the school arrangements (Kelly, 2009). The term itself is attributed to Philip W. Jackson and is not always meant to be a negative. Hidden curriculum, if its potential is realized, could benefit students and learners in all educational systems. Also, it does not just include the physical environment of the school, but the relationships formed or not formed between students and other students or even students and teachers (Jackson, 1986).
- Excluded curriculum or null curriculum: topics or perspectives that are excluded from the curriculum.

It may also take the form of extracurricular activities. These may include school-sponsored programs intended to supplement the academic aspects of the school experience, as well as community-based programs and activities. Examples of school-sponsored extracurricular programs include sports, academic clubs, and performing arts. Community-based programs and activities may take place at a school after hours but are not linked directly to the school. Community-based programs frequently expand on the curriculum that was introduced in the classroom. For instance, students may be introduced to environmental conservation in the classroom. This knowledge is further developed through a community-based program. Participants then act on what they know with a conservation project. Community-based extracurricular activities may include "environmental clubs, 4-H, boy/girl scouts, and religious groups" (Hancock, Dyk, & Jones, 2012).

Kerr defines curriculum as "all the learning which is planned and guided by the school, whether it is carried on in groups or individually, inside or outside of school."

Braslavsky states that curriculum is an agreement among communities, educational professionals, and the State on what learners should take on during specific periods of their lives. Furthermore, the curriculum defines "why, what, when, where, how, and with whom to learn."

Smith (1996, 2000) says that, "[a] syllabus will not generally indicate the relative importance of its topics or the order in which they are to be studied. Where people still equate curriculum with a syllabus they are likely to limit their planning to a consideration of the content or the body of knowledge that they wish to transmit."

According to Smith, a curriculum can be ordered into a procedure:

Step 1: Diagnosis of needs.
Step 2: Formulation of objectives.
Step 3: Selection of content.
Step 4: Organization of content.
Step 5: Selection of learning experiences.
Step 6: Organization of learning experiences.
Step 7: Determination of what to evaluate and of the ways and means of doing it.

=== Types of curricula ===
Under some definitions, the curriculum is prescriptive and is based on a more general syllabus, which merely specifies the topics that must be understood and the level of understanding required to achieve a particular grade or standard.

A curriculum may also refer to a defined and prescribed course of studies, which students must fulfill in order to pass a certain level of education. For example, an elementary school might discuss how its curricula is designed to improve national testing scores or help students learn fundamental skills. An individual teacher might also refer to his or her curriculum, meaning all the subjects that will be taught during a school year. The courses are arranged in a sequence to make learning a subject easier. In schools, a curriculum spans several grades.

On the other hand, a high school might refer to their curricula as the courses required in order to receive one's diploma. They might also refer to it in exactly the same way as an elementary school and use it to mean both individual courses needed to pass as well as the overall offering of courses, which help prepare a student for life after high school.

A curriculum can be seen from different perspectives. What societies envisage as important teaching and learning constitutes the "intended" curriculum. Since it is usually presented in official documents, it may be also called the "written" or "official" curriculum. However, at a classroom level this intended curriculum may be altered through a range of complex classroom interactions, and what is actually delivered can be considered the "implemented" curriculum. What learners really learn (i.e. what can be assessed and can be demonstrated as learning outcomes or competencies) constitutes the "achieved" or "learned" curriculum. In addition, curriculum theory points to a "hidden" curriculum (i.e. the unintended development of personal values and beliefs of learners, teachers, and communities; the unexpected impact of a curriculum; or the unforeseen aspects of a learning process). Those who develop the intended curriculum should have all these different dimensions of the curriculum in view. While the "written" curriculum does not exhaust the meaning of curriculum, it is important because it represents the vision of the society. The "written" curriculum is usually expressed in comprehensive and user-friendly documents, such as curriculum frameworks or subject curricula/syllabi, and in relevant and helpful learning materials, such as textbooks, teacher guides, and assessment guides.

In some cases, people see the curriculum entirely in terms of the subjects that are taught, and as set out within the set of textbooks, and forget the wider goals of competencies and personal development. This is why a curriculum framework is important. It sets the subjects within this wider context, and shows how learning experiences within the subjects need to contribute to the attainment of the wider goals.

Curriculum is almost always defined with relation to schooling. According to some, it is the major division between formal and informal education. However, under some circumstances it may also be applied to informal education or free-choice learning settings. For instance, a science museum may have a "curriculum" of what topics or exhibits it wishes to cover. Many after-school programs in the US have tried to apply the concept; this typically has more success when not rigidly clinging to the definition of curriculum as a product or as a body of knowledge to be transferred. Rather, informal education and free-choice learning settings are more suited to the model of curriculum as practice or praxis. (Smith,2020)

=== Historical conception ===
Action is response; it is adaptation, adjustment.
— John Dewey

Whatever the origins and intentions of early curricula, the function of inculcating culture had emerged by the time of ancient Babylonia. Ancient Roman curricula came to emphasise Greek as well as Latin skills, with emphasis on the study of classical poetry. This model influenced the curricula of medieval and Renaissance education.

In the early years of the 20th century, the traditional concept held of the curriculum was "that it is a body of subjects or subject matter prepared by the teachers for the students to learn". It was synonymous to the "course of study" and "syllabus".

In The Curriculum, the first textbook published on the subject, in 1918, John Franklin Bobbitt said that curriculum, as an idea, has its roots in the Latin word for race-course, explaining the curriculum as the course of deeds and experiences through which children become the adults they should be to succeed later in life. Furthermore, the curriculum encompasses the entire scope of formative deed and experience occurring in and out of school - such as experiences that are unplanned and undirected or those that are intentionally directed for the purposeful formation of adult members of society - not only experiences occurring in school. (cf. image at right.)

To Bobbitt, the curriculum is a social-engineering arena. Per his cultural presumptions and social definitions, his curricular formulation has two notable features:

- that scientific experts would best be qualified to and justified in designing curricula based upon their expert knowledge of what qualities are desirable in adult members of society, and which experiences would generate said qualities
- curriculum defined as the deeds-experiences the student ought to have to become the adult he or she ought to become

Hence, he defined the curriculum as an ideal, rather than as the concrete reality of the deeds and experiences that form who and what people become.

Contemporary views of curriculum reject these features of Bobbitt's postulates, but retain the basis of curriculum as the course of experience(s) that form humans into persons. Personal formation via curricula is studied both at the personal and group levels, i.e. cultures and societies (e.g. professional formation, academic discipline via historical experience). The formation of a group is reciprocal, with the formation of its individual participants.

Although it formally appeared in Bobbitt's definition, curriculum as a course of formative experience also pervades the work of John Dewey (1859–1952), who disagreed with Bobbitt on important matters. Although Bobbitt's and Dewey's idealistic understanding of "curriculum" is different from current, restricted uses of the word, writers of curricula and researchers generally share it as common, substantive understanding of curriculum. Development does not mean just getting something out of the mind. It is a development of experience and into experience that is really wanted.

Robert M. Hutchins (1899–1977), president of the University of Chicago, regarded curriculum as "permanent studies" where the rules of grammar, rhetoric, logic, and mathematics for basic education are emphasized. Basic education should emphasize the three Rs and college education should be grounded on liberal education. On the other hand, Arthur Bestor (1908–1994), an essentialist, believes that the mission of the school should be intellectual training. Hence, curriculum should focus on the fundamental intellectual disciplines of grammar, literature, and writing. It should also include mathematics, science, history, and foreign language.

According to Joseph Schwab, discipline is the sole source of curriculum. In our education system, curriculum is divided into chunks of knowledge called subject areas in basic education including English, mathematics, science, and social studies. In college, discipline may include humanities, sciences, languages, and many more. Curricula should consist entirely of knowledge which comes from various disciplines. Dewey proposed that learning the lesson should be more interesting and beneficial than receiving a scolding, being ridiculed, or being required to stay after school, among other punishments.

Thus, a curriculum can be viewed as a field of study. It is made up of its foundations (philosophical, historical, psychological, and social foundations), domains of knowledge, as well as its research theories and principles. Curricula as an area of study should be scholarly and theoretical. The field is concerned with broad, historical, philosophical social issues and academics. Mark Smith suggests a starting definition of "curriculum" offered by John Kerr and taken up by Vic Kelly in his standard work on the curriculum: "All the learning which is planned and guided by the school, whether it is carried on in groups or individually, inside or outside the school".

There are four ways of approaching curriculum theory and practice:

1. curriculum as a body of knowledge to be transmitted
2. curriculum as an attempt to help students achieve a goal
3. curriculum as a process
4. curriculum as praxis

In recent years the field of education and curriculum has expanded outside the walls of the classroom and into other settings, such as museums. Within these settings curriculum is an even broader topic, including various teachers, inanimate objects such as audio-tour devices, and even the learners themselves. As with the traditional idea of curriculum, curriculum in a free-choice learning-environment can consist of the explicit stated curriculum and the hidden curriculum; both of which contribute to the learner's experience and lessons from the experience. These elements are further compounded by the setting, cultural influences, and the state of mind of the learner. Museums and other similar settings are most commonly leveraged within traditional classroom settings as enhancements to the curriculum when educators develop curricula that encompass visits to museums, zoos, and aquariums.

=== Progressivist views ===
On the other hand, to a progressivist, a listing of school subjects, syllabi, courses of study, and lists of courses of specific discipline do not make a curriculum. These can only be called curriculum if the written materials are actualized by the learner. Broadly speaking, curriculum is defined as the total learning experiences of the individual. This definition is anchored on John Dewey's definition of experience and education. He believed that reflective thinking is a means that unifies curricular elements. Thought is not derived from action but tested by application.

Caswell and Campbell viewed curricula as "all experiences children have under the guidance of teachers." This definition is shared by Smith, Stanley, and Shores when they defined curriculum as "a sequence of potential experiences set up in schools for the purpose of disciplining children and youth in group ways of thinking and acting."

Curriculum as a process is when a teacher enters a particular schooling and situation with the ability to think critically, an understanding of their role and the expectations others have of them, and a proposal for action which sets out essential principles and features of the educational encounter. Guided by these, they encourage conversations between, and with, people in the situation out of which may come a course of thinking and action. Plus, the teacher continually evaluates the process and what they can see of outcomes.

Marsh and Willis view curricula as all the "experiences in the classroom which are planned and enacted by teacher, and also learned by the students."

Any definition of curriculum, if it is to be practically effective and productive, must offer much more than a statement about knowledge-content or merely the subjects which schooling is to teach, transmit, or deliver. Some would argue of the course that the values implicit in the arrangements made by schools for their pupils are quite clearly in the consciousness of teachers and planners, again especially when the planners are politicians, and are equally clearly accepted by them as part of what pupils should learn in school, even if they are not overtly recognized by the pupils themselves. In other words, those who design curricula deliberately plan the schools' "expressive culture". If this is the case, then, the curriculum is 'hidden' only to or from the pupils, and the values to be learned clearly from a part of what is planned for pupils. They must, therefore, be accepted as fully a part of the curriculum, and especially as an important focus because questions must be asked concerning the legitimacy of such practices.

Currently, a spiral curriculum is promoted as allowing students to revisit a subject matter's content at the different levels of development of the subject matter being studied. The constructivist approach proposes that children learn best via pro-active engagement with the educational environment, as in learning through discovery.

== Primary and secondary education ==
A curriculum may be partly or entirely determined by an external, authoritative body (e.g., the National Curriculum for England in English schools, or the International Primary Curriculum for International Schools).

Crucial to the curriculum is the definition of the course objectives that usually are expressed as learning outcomes and normally include the program's assessment strategy. These outcomes and assessments are grouped as units (or modules), and, therefore, the curriculum comprises a collection of such units, each, in turn, comprising a specialized, specific part of the curriculum. So, a typical curriculum includes communications, numeracy, information technology, and social skills units, with specific, specialized teaching of each.

Core curricula are often instituted, at the primary and secondary levels, by school boards, Departments of Education, or other administrative agencies charged with overseeing education. A core curriculum is a curriculum, or course of study, which is deemed central and usually made mandatory for all students of a school or school system. However, even when core requirements exist, they do not necessarily involve a requirement for students to engage in one particular class or activity. For example, a school might mandate a music appreciation class, but students may opt out if they take a performing arts class.

=== Australia ===
In Australia, the Australian Curriculum took effect nationwide in 2014, after a curriculum development process that began in 2010. Previously, each state's Education Department had traditionally established curricula. The Australian Curriculum consists of one curriculum covering eight subject areas through year 10, and another covering fifteen subjects for the senior secondary years.

=== Canada ===
In Canada each province and territory has the authority to create its own curriculum. However, the Northwest Territories and Nunavut both choose to use the Alberta Curriculum for select parts of their curriculum. The territories also use Alberta's standardized tests in some subjects.

=== Iran ===
Iran has recently changed back to 6 year instead of 5 Elementary schools and two three year junior and second middle/high schools. There is Islamic seminary Hawza are also with 10-14 year programming.

=== South Korea ===
The National Curriculum of Korea covers kindergarten, primary, secondary, and special education. The version currently in place is the 7th National Curriculum, which has been revised in 2007 and 2009. The curriculum provides a framework for a common set of subjects through 9th grade, and elective subjects in grades 10 through 12.

=== Japan ===
The curriculum in Japan is determined based on the guidelines for education and the guidelines for learning presented by the Ministry of Education, Culture, Sports, Science and Technology (MEXT). When deciding on the curriculum for each school, the school's organizers will decide on the outline by referring to the manuals and explanations prepared by the Education, Science and Technology Ministry and other public offices, and the schools will decide on additional annual plans. The Courses of Education and Courses of Study are fully revised every 10 years. Before World War II, the curriculum was based on the school regulations corresponding to each school type.

=== The Netherlands ===
The Dutch system is based on directives coming from the Ministry of Education, Culture and Science (OCW). Primary and secondary education use key objectives to create curricula. For primary education the total number of objectives has been reduced from 122 in 1993 to 58 in 2006. Starting in 2009 and 2010 all key objectives are obligatory for primary education. The key objectives are oriented towards subject areas such as language, mathematics, orientation towards self and the world, art, and physical education. All of the objectives have accompanying concrete activities. Also final exams are determined by the OCW and required. Parts of those exams are taken in a national setting, created by the Centrale Examencommissie Vaststelling Opgaven (CEVO). Furthermore, the OCW will determine the number of hours to be spent per subject. Apart from these directives every school can determine its own curriculum.

=== Nigeria ===
In 2005, the Nigerian government adopted a national Basic Education Curriculum for grades 1 through 9. The policy was an outgrowth of the Universal Basic Education program announced in 1999, to provide free, compulsory, continuous public education for these years. In 2014, the government implemented a revised version of the national curriculum, reducing the number of subjects covered from 20 to 10.

=== Russia ===
Core curriculum has typically been highly emphasized in Soviet and Russian universities and technical institutes.

=== United Kingdom ===
==== England and Wales ====
The National Curriculum was introduced into England, Wales and Northern Ireland as a nationwide curriculum for primary and secondary state schools following the Education Reform Act 1988. It does not apply to private schools, which may set their own curricula, but it ensures that state schools of all local education authorities have a common curriculum. Academy schools have a significant degree of autonomy in deviating from the National Curriculum.

Every state school must offer a curriculum which is balanced and broadly based and which promotes the spiritual, moral, cultural, mental and physical development of pupils at the school and of society, and prepares pupils at the school for the opportunities, responsibilities and experiences of later life. For each of the statutory curriculum subjects, the Secretary of State for Education is required to set out a Programme of Study which outlines the content and matters which must be taught in those subjects at relevant Key Stages. Teachers should set high expectations for every pupil. They should plan stretching work for pupils whose attainment is significantly above the expected standard. Teachers should use appropriate assessment to set targets which are deliberately ambitious.

==== Scotland ====
In Scotland, the Curriculum for Excellence (CfE) was introduced in August 2010 in all schools. The national qualifications were introduced in 2013 by the Scottish Qualifications Authority (SQA). The national qualifications include the Life Skills Coursework (SFL), National 3 (NAT3), National 4 (NAT4), National 5 (NAT5), Higher, and Advanced Higher.

=== United States ===
In the U.S., each state, with the individual school districts, establishes the curricula taught. Each state, however, builds its curriculum with great participation of national academic subject groups selected by the United States Department of Education such as the National Council of Teachers of Mathematics (NCTM) for mathematical instruction.

The Common Core State Standards Initiative (CCSSI) promulgates a core set of standards which are specific information and skills a student needs to know at each grade level in order to graduate. States may adopt these standards in part or whole and expand upon them. Schools and states (depending on how much control a state gives to its local schools) then develop their curriculum to meet each of these standards. This coordination is intended to make it possible to use more of the same textbooks across states, and to move toward a more uniform minimum level of education attainment.

According to the CCSSI, "[d]ecisions on how to implement the standards, including the right supports to put in place, are made at the state and local levels. As such, states and localities are taking different approaches to implementing the standards and providing their teachers with the supports they need to help students successfully reach the standards."

== Higher education ==
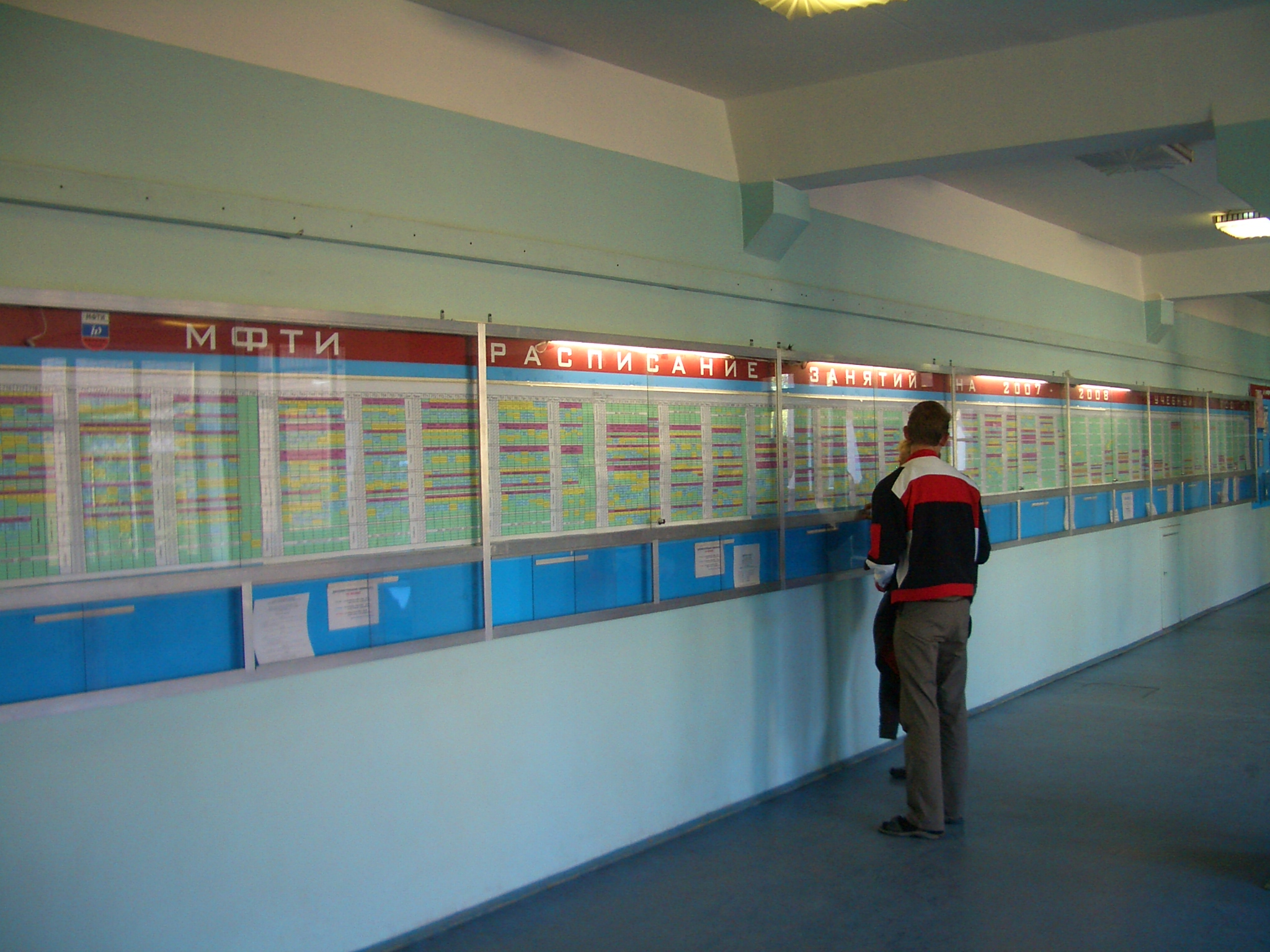
Moscow Institute of Physics and Technology student examines the university's main class schedule board on the first day of classes to find what classes he – and all students in his specialization (sub-major) – will attend this semester.

Many educational institutions are currently trying to balance two opposing forces. On the one hand, some believe students should have a common knowledge foundation, often in the form of a core curriculum whereas others want students to be able to pursue their own educational interests, often through early specialty in a major or through the free choice of courses. This tension has received a large amount of coverage due to Harvard University's reorganization of its core requirements.

An essential feature of curriculum design, seen in every college catalog and at every other level of schooling, is the identification of prerequisites for each course. These prerequisites can be satisfied by taking particular courses, and in some cases by examination, or by other means, such as work experience. In general, more advanced courses in any subject require some foundation in basic courses, but some coursework requires study in other departments, as in the sequence of math classes required for a physics major, or the language requirements for students preparing in literature, music, or scientific research. A more detailed curriculum design must deal with prerequisites within a course for each topic taken up. This in turn leads to the problems of course organization and scheduling once the dependencies between topics are known.

=== Core curriculum ===
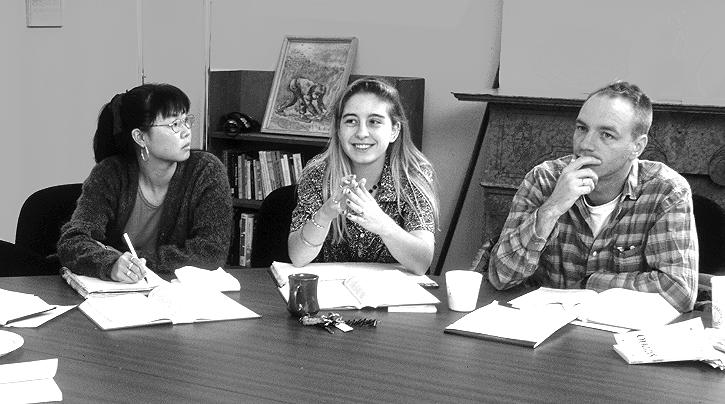
Shimer College students discussing texts in the school's core curriculum

At the undergraduate level, individual college and university administrations and faculties sometimes mandate core curricula, especially in the liberal arts. However, because of increasing specialization and depth in the student's major field of study, a typical core curriculum in higher education mandates a far smaller proportion of a student's course work than a high school or elementary school core curriculum prescribes.

Among the best known and most expansive core curricula programs at leading American colleges and universities are those of Columbia University and the University of Chicago. Both can take up to two years to complete without advanced standing, and are designed to foster critical skills in a broad range of academic disciplines, including the social sciences, humanities, physical and biological sciences, mathematics, writing and foreign languages.

In 1999, the University of Chicago announced plans to reduce and modify the content of its core curriculum, including lowering the number of required courses from 21 to 15 and offering a wider range of content. When The New York Times, The Economist, and other major news outlets picked up this story, the university became the focal point of a national debate on education. A set of university administrators, notably then-President Hugo F. Sonnenschein, argued that reducing the core curriculum had become both a financial and educational imperative, as the university was struggling to attract a commensurate volume of applicants to its undergraduate division compared to peer schools as a result of what was perceived by the pro-change camp as a reaction by "the average eighteen-year-old" to the expanse of the collegiate core.

As core curricula began to diminish over the course of the twentieth century at many American schools, some smaller institutions became famous for embracing a core curriculum that covers nearly the student's entire undergraduate education, often utilizing classic texts of the western canon to teach all subjects including science. Five Great Books colleges in the United States follow this approach: St. John's, Shimer, Thomas Aquinas, Gutenberg College and Thomas More.

=== Distribution requirements ===
Some colleges opt for the middle ground of the continuum between specified and unspecified curricula by using a system of distribution requirements. In such a system, students are required to take courses in particular fields of learning, but are free to choose specific courses within those fields.

=== Open curriculum ===
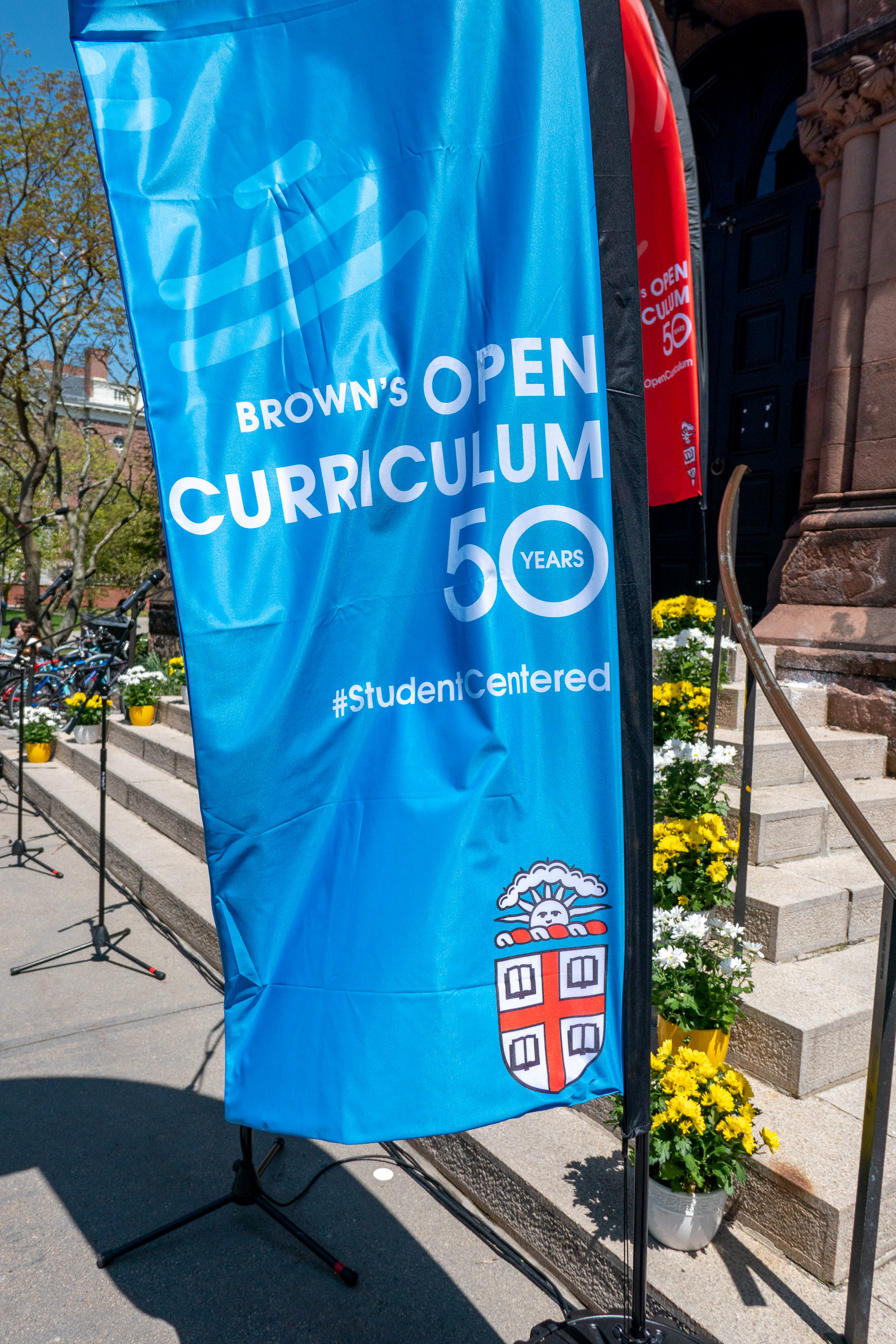
Brown University celebrated the 50th anniversary of their Open Curriculum in 2019.

Other institutions have largely done away with core requirements in their entirety. Brown University offers the "Open Curriculum", implemented after a student-led reform movement in 1969, which allows students to take courses without concern for any requirements except those in their chosen concentrations (majors), plus two writing courses. In this vein, it is possible for students to graduate without taking college-level science or math courses, or to take only science or math courses. Amherst College requires that students take one of a list of first-year seminars, but has no required classes or distribution requirements. Similarly, Grinnell College requires students to take a First-Year Tutorial in their first semester, and has no other class or distribution requirements. Others include Evergreen State College, Hamilton College, and Smith College.

Wesleyan University is another school that has not and does not require any set distribution of courses. However, Wesleyan does make clear "General Education Expectations" such that if a student does not meet these expectations, they would not be eligible for academic honors upon graduation.

== Gender inequality in curricula ==
Gender inequality in curricula is how men and women are not treated equally in several types of curricula. More precisely, gender inequality is visible in the curriculum of both schools and Teacher Education Institutes (TEIs). Physical education (PE) is an example where gender equality issues are highlighted because of preconceived stereotyping of boys and girls. The general belief is that boys are better at physical activities than girls, and that girls are better at 'home' activities such as sewing and cooking. This is the case in many cultures around the world and is not specific to one culture only.

== See also ==
- Academic advising
- Bias in curricula
- Body of knowledge
- CSCOPE (education)
- Curriculum studies
- Educational program
- Europass
- Extracurricular activity
- Hidden curriculum
- Lesson
- Lesson plan
- Lifelong learning
- Open source curriculum
- Pedagogy
- Residential curriculum
- Structure of the disciplines
- Sudbury schools have no curriculum.
- Syllabus
- Unschooling emphasizes self-directed learning rather than a curriculum.
- Curricula in early childhood care and education

== Works cited ==
- Bilbao, Purita P., Lucido, Paz I., Iringan, Tomasa C., and Javier, Rodrigo B. (2008). Curriculum Development. Quezon City: Lorimar Publishing, Inc.
- Kelly, A.V. (2009). The Curriculum: theory and practice (6th ed.). ISBN 9781847872746.
