= Structure of the disciplines =

The Structure of the disciplines is a concept in the study of curricula.

== Overview ==
The rise of geopolitical difference after World War II gave birth to a desire to achieve high levels of rigor in academic pursuits. A systematic approach to developing models of inquiry in the fields of study forced educational institutions to engage subject areas in terms of scientific inquiry. While the societal influences of this perspective no longer play out in current times, the concepts of academic inquiry have a place in the current educational system.

== Curriculum Tenets ==
A tenet of the structure of disciplines curriculum approach is that topics are evolving and not static. This allows each subject area to engage in research and study to grow within the subject. A second tenet relates to this research; each discipline must engage in research and follow a discipline-specific model of inquiry. Thirdly, the structures of discipline put forth that each learner develop a sense of multiple models of scientific inquiry relating to multiple disciplines. This creates a soundness of education across many fields of study and enables a learner to become expert in one or many of the disciplines studied.

== Societal Influences ==
During the post-World War II, the United States of America was engaged in steep competition with the former Soviet Union; known as the Cold War. Cold War mentalities called for strength in the face of perceived enemies and this extended to include schooling.

World War II saw exponential advancements in sciences, including the development of super weapons. The discipline of scientist became widely regarded and supported changes in the school environment to approach all fields with the same rigor of scientific inquiry. Thus, classrooms saw changes in how curriculum developed and implemented through instruction.

Related to these influences is the focus on militaristic strength and rigor. In the Cold War era, military research showed a systemic method to study subject matter. By expanding the scientific management approach of the early 20th century, practitioners of the structures of the disciplines curriculum perspective could strengthen how subject matter study took place in the classroom.

== Common criticisms ==
The scientific approach to studying multiple fields produces an air of academic elitism or arrogance towards other fields not as adept at scientific inquiry. While inquiry models can develop within disciplines, some are not as prepared for the rigors of widely accepted inquiry models.

Through the study of disciplines approach, the focus of the curriculum shifts from learner-centric to subject-centric instruction. Rather than look at how learners interact with the subject, the subject is studied with the learners acting more as observers than creators.

Finally, with the changing from the xenophobic views of the Cold War, the society is open to exploration across national and geopolitical lines, making the influences of this curriculum perspective outmoded. While applicable in instruction, the pressures of conforming to a national policy no longer exist. In the place of nationalistic pride is the concept of the world as connected and dependent on other groups for the expansion of knowledge.

== Learning environment applications ==
An obvious application of the structure of the disciplines approach is based in the sciences and mathematics fields. The concept of scientific inquiry applies greatly to fields that systemically decipher meaning and understanding. During the Cold War significant funding was available to expand the sciences in school settings. Applications of this curriculum perspective are evident in many scholarly pursuits including the discourse and inquiry around the expansion of knowledge. The systematic decoding of accepted information into debatable and verifiable content is an important element of academic discourse.

The structures of the disciplines approach is applicable in many areas and the tenets of creating strong academic achievers is not lost in schooling and non-schooling settings. Perhaps, most outmoded is the reasoning behind the development of this approach. Today the curriculum perspective is still evident in both school and non-school environments.
