= Residential curriculum =

A residential curriculum is a framework used by colleges and universities to create learning opportunities and programs for students outside the classroom and the college residences.

It provides opportunity for students to learn valuable skills for their personal and professional lives.

== Description ==
In 1996, at the Student Learning Institute in Harrisonburg, Virginia, a residential curriculum was proposed. It was offered as a way for college student affairs divisions to articulate intentional, planned, and structured learning experiences through an established committee.

In place of a traditional programming model, a residential curriculum utilizes a curricular approach that ensures student experiences are:

- sequenced
- intentional
- unique to the institution

An example of a residential curriculum is at Wilfrid Laurier University. The four learning goals for its program are Life Skills, Self-Awareness, Community Integration and Participation, and Academic Curiosity and Success.

Measurement of a learning experience's success is assessed by reviewing student learning that took place through the experience, as opposed to measuring success by number of students that attend.

The American College Personnel Association (ACPA) outline that although the concept of a residential curriculum was developed primarily within residence life, the approach has been adopted in many different facets of student affairs. The execution of a curricular approach is different for all campuses and institutions, but the foundation of this learning is used to organize an educational activity to ensure the achievement of learning outcomes.

== Creating residential curriculum ==
To create a residential curriculum, a department must:

1. Conduct an "archeological dig" of the institution's mission, goals, and values. This process could involve examining strategic plans, mission statement, and core leadership capabilities.
2. Turn the themes from the archeological dig into learning goals. These learning goals will help to influence the educational priority and overall approach.

When institutions have a residential curriculum. it helps to support the student staff working in residence as the intentional learning is created by professional staff. This curriculum should be based on the latest in developmental research and learning theories in order to bring forth the best programming to the students. Due to this, it is recommended that professional staff have a good understanding of these theories, and highly encouraged to gain these skills at a Master graduate level.

== Theories and Research that help build Curriculum ==
Having constant updated research around the points below would allow the institution to build a successful program related to residential curriculum.

- Development - particularly the work of Marcia Baxter Magolda on Self-Authorship
- Student Identity
- Assessment
- Educational Design
