= Self-authorship =

Stage of adult development

Self-authorship is a stage of adult development where the individual has extended beyond the need to be socialized among their community and has developed their own identity, ideologies, and beliefs which they hold fast to. Important theorists such as Robert Kegan and Marcia Baxter Magolda have contributed extensively to our understanding of self-authorship and its public recognition. Self-authorship has three primary parts, cognitive, intrapersonal, and interpersonal dimensions. It also involves how individual's turn experiences into growth opportunities.

== Guide ==
Self-authorship is defined by Robert Kegan as an "ideology, an internal personal identity, that can coordinate, integrate, act upon, or invent values, beliefs, convictions, generalizations, ideals, abstractions, interpersonal loyalties, and intrapersonal states. It is no longer authored by them, it authors them and thereby achieves a personal authority."

Self-authorship is only a single phase of development within the lifelong process of self-evolution. Instead of depending on external values, beliefs, and interpersonal loyalties, self-authorship relies on internal generation and coordination of one's beliefs, values and internal loyalties. This phase can often be seen at critical turning points in an individual's life, such as during education for a professional career.

Self-authorship spans over three dimensions: cognitive, intrapersonal, and interpersonal. It is based on theory involving adult learning and gaining of knowledge with the product of self-authorship including learning and growth. The concept of the "object" and the concept of the "self" make up self-authorship. One is not born with self-authorship. There are steps to attain self-authorship which include following external formulas, then crossroads and eventually obtaining self-authorship. There are elements of self-authorship that include trusting the internal voice, building an internal foundation and securing internal commitments.

Not every experience allows us to work towards self-authorship. Developmentally effective experiences are what help guide us to self-authorship. These experiences allow for others to look at the world around them and search deep within themselves in order to develop their own opinions. It requires a heightened sense of self awareness as well as humility if you want to turn experiences into developmental ones. It does not matter if the experiences are positive or negative, developmental experiences are ones that change and that can be either. These influences and internal searching allows the individual to understand what their opinions are, why they have those opinions and how that opinion was formulated. In addition, these experiences allow for the person to rely on one's internal beliefs in order to make decisions.

Cultural factors play a role in the development of self-authorship. While identity dissonance is a catalyst in the development of self-authorship, for African Americans, relational dissonance is also involved. The addition of racial dissonance can create additional difficulties in the self-authorship process, as has been seen among Latino college students in the United States. Relational dissonance adds the additional question of "Who are we?" of one's identifying group to the question "Who am I?" asked as the result of identity dissonance. Multiple cultural factors including race, gender, and sexuality can all add additional complexity to developing self-authorship.

== Leading Theorists of Self-Authorship ==
Robert Kegan

Robert Kegan’s work was inspired by Jean Piaget's "Theory of Cognitive Development". Kegan identified that Piaget’s research did not include the emotion of an individual's personal development.

To address this gap, Kegan conducted research that informed his 1994 theory of the “Evolution of Consciousness”. Kegan named five progressions that a person would move through when transitioning from stable environments to unstable environments. Each unstable environment has the ability to progress the individual from one stage to the next.

Kegan identified each progression, using three different titles throughout his research. The most recent naming convention is “Forms of Mind” (2000) . The Forms of Mind follow this order:

Order 0: Newborn - 18 months old. Infants live in an object-less world, until they begin to recognize their surroundings.

Order 1: Occurs at approximate two years old when the child understands that they can control their body's reflexes.

Order 2: Instrumental Mind, also known as the Imperial Mind. The individual has the ability to think in a more organized way. 6% of the adult population fall into this stage.

Order 3: Socialized Mind. Ability to understand how they process emotion and become committed to the people and guiding beliefs that make up their community. 58% of the adult population fall into this stage.

Order 4: Self-Authoring Mind. Individual has the ability to self-regulate and looks for relationships that benefit themselves and others. These relationships become important as the individual looks to their relationships as a way to continually develop. 35% of the adult population falls into this stage.

Order 5: Self-Transforming Mind. When conducting research, Kegan found that many adults did not reach this stage and those who did, did not reach Order 5 until the age of 40 years old. 1% of the adult population falls into this stage.

Marcia Baxter Magolda

Self-authorship, as defined by Marcia Baxter Magolda's research focused on the epistemological development of college students to identify six guiding assumptions informing her development model. As one continues to distance themselves from depending on external authorities for beliefs, identities and social relationships, self authorship begins to evolve. There are four stages that guide the progression to self-authorship:

Stage One: Following External Formulas

Those in this stage rely on external formulas for what one believes, how to construct one's identity and how to guide social relationships.

Stage Two: Crossroads

This is a transitional period. In this period, one is in between relying on external formulas and achieving self-authorship. The conflict people in this stage are experiencing is between the values they develop that are integral to the sense of self and the demands they experience in their roles and relationships with others.

Stage Three: Self-Authorship

Robert Kegan first named self-authorship, as the individuals "shift of meaning-making capacity from outside the self to inside the self". Stage three, is the pinnacle of the evolution of self-authorship. In this stage, one is able to be unique and express their internal authority. One has strength to stand apart from the mainstream. One's responsibility lies in interpreting experiences based trusting one's internal voices, not on other's values and ideas.

Stage Four: Personal Foundation

In this stage individuals are grounded in who they are. The meaning they place on their relationship with themselves and with others which informs their belief systems.

Jordan B. Peterson

Clinical psychologist Jordan B. Peterson applied the concept of self-authoring in a therapeutic methodology. His writing system, the Self-Authoring Suite, attempts to apply self-analysis of one's personality and goals. The program was inspired in part by the work of JW Pennebaker who performed research that tested the effects of writing and the benefits of coming to conclusions and understanding regarding past experiences. Dr. Peterson also took inspiration from Laura A. King, who has published numerous studies focused on the advantages of writing about future life goals and/or positive life experiences.

In a 2009 study entitled "Personality and Language Use In Self-Narratives", Jacob B. Hirsh and Jordan B. Peterson facilitated and observed the self-authoring of undergraduate students as they participated actively in "past-authoring" (writing about significantly influential periods and events from one's past) and "future-authoring" (writing about one's goals, the environment and steps required to achieve them, and possible challenges).

== Three dimensions of self-authorship ==
Self-authorship consists of three dimensions: cognitive, intrapersonal, and interpersonal. “Self-authored people employ complex cognitive processes of meaning-making in ways that recognize the socially constructed nature of knowledge (cognitive) while also keeping in mind their own beliefs, values, and goals (intrapersonal),” as well as those of others (interpersonal). Cognitive self-authorship focuses on the idea that the individual is responsible for their thoughts and beliefs rather than being influenced by external sources. As a result, learning becomes more open-ended and knowledge is seen as more contextual, rather than absolute. Interpersonal self-authoring revolves around how the individual views their relationships with others. A self-authoring mind is one that has relationships, but whose thoughts and behaviors are based on the individual’s beliefs rather than the beliefs of those with whom they associate. It draws from the earlier stages but expands upon them and is not limited by their modes of thinking. However this does not mean that people can revert to earlier stages, they are simply taking what they learned and applying it to their new stage. Intrapersonal self-authoring centers on the core values and beliefs that the individual possesses. Self-authorship encourages development of beliefs based on one’s own choices rather than simply imitating the beliefs/values of those around them. These original beliefs then serve as the foundation and standard to which the individual’s thoughts and actions are held.

== Theoretical assumptions ==
Self-authorship is grounded in two assumptions about adult learning and knowledge. The first assumption states people create knowledge by interpreting their personal experiences through what is known as constructivism. This focuses on the meaning that is made of the experience from an individual perspective. The second assumption is that self-authorship has an underlying structure that is developmental in nature. In other words, as one continues to mature, his or her self-authorship also continues to develop. How one organizes and identifies with his or her experiences continues to change.

Although many may think the products of continuous changes in self-authorship are an accumulation of knowledge, skills and information, this is not the case. The true products of continuous changes in self-authorship are learning and growth.

== Relationships involved in self authorship ==
Kegan developed a theory that is built on Piaget's stages of development. While Piaget's stages end at age 11, Kegan created a theory that continues into adulthood. His theory is known as the Subject-Object Theory. The relationship between "subject" and "object" are what make up self-authorship. Subject refers to the elements of organizing that one identifies with. It is inseparable from the self and the individual may be unaware of the behavior that is developed due to what they are subject to. Object refers to the information that gets organized. They are the elements that one can reflect on for future reference and accept responsibility for.

When going through the subject-object transitions, the structure of the meaning-making or the self-authorship becomes more complex. Change in this relationship demonstrates the positive developments that occur as an individual learns to take more responsibility. It allows for tolerance of difference and openness with less rigidity. Although this transformation is for the improvement of an individual as new capacities are discovered, it is normal to feel a sense of being lost and anxious as they transition. While there is more to gain, there is still a valuable part of the self that was given up.

== Three Elements of Self Authorship ==
Following a 21 year study, Marcia Baxter Magolda designed the three elements of self-authorship by studying constructivist interviews. She dissected the narratives of young adults in the age range of 18 years old to 39 years old.

Trusting the Internal Voice

By trusting the internal voice, the individual better understands their reality and their reaction to their reality. By using internal voice as a way to shape reactions to external events, confidence in using personal beliefs and values magnifies their "ability to take ownership of how they ma[k]e meaning of external events".

Building an Internal Foundation

The individual consciously works to create an internal foundation to guide reactions to reality. One does this by combining one's identity, relationships, beliefs and values into a set of internal commitments from which to act upon.

Securing Internal Commitments

Baxter Magolda described this shift as a "crossing over", where the individuals core beliefs become a "personal authority", which they act upon.

== Developmentally effective experiences for providing self-authorship ==
Not every experience is an effective experience for providing self-authorship. However, there are experiences that do help to provide self-authorship. One experience involves increasing awareness, understanding and openness to diversity. This allows for one to become more open and understanding of differences and see how one's own background affects how one identifies socially.

Another experience involves exploring and establishing a basis for beliefs, choices and actions. This allows for one to think for one's self and to stand up for one's beliefs and challenge those that do not have the same beliefs.

An additional experience involves one developing a sense of identity to guide choices. In this experience, one learns from other's mistakes or challenges and evaluates one's own choices and behaviors. From this, one makes deliberate decisions about how to live one's life.

The last experience involves increasing awareness of openness to responsibility for one's own learning. During this experience, one learns to take responsibility for their own learning and they begin to understand how learning new things influences life and identity.

== Leading factors in development of self-authorship in diverse cultures ==
According to Jane Pizzolato et al. 2012: cultural, relational, and psychological interactions affect self-authorship development. This is true, especially for African Americans. In a study of diverse college students from three public universities, they found that psychological contexts seem to be related to students' dissonance experiences and the process of self-authorship. Specifically, they found the primary catalyst of self-authorship to be the students' previous notions of identity dissonance when asked, "Who am I?". However, for African Americans, the question was less about, "Who Am I?" in the intrapersonal dimension of self-authorship but, "Who are we?" referencing the minority or ethnic group. The "Who are we?" question shows that previous notions of relational dissonance also lead to self-authorship development. This seemed to be more relevant for African Americans and other minority groups.

According to Vasti Torres and Ebelia Hernandez 2007: Latino college students face challenges to self-authorship as they recognize and adapt to perceived racism.

Adding other conflicts, such as those of gender and sexuality, further complicate the development of self-authorship. When looking at the development of self-authorship in gay Latino college students, Robert Orozco and Lara Perez-Felkner 2018 conceptualized a framework of thought they refer to as "conociéndose y escribiéndose¨, which explains the difficulties posed by having to self-author in the face of multiple conflicts in identity. This framework was based on Gloria Anzaldúa's perception of "conocimiento", or the journey required to learn one's identity in a shifting world.

== An Everyone Culture ==
Robert Kegan and Lisa Laskow Lahey, in their book An Everyone Culture, explore the concept of a "Self-Authoring mind." They describe this stage of development as an individual's capacity to "step back enough from the social environment to generate an internal seat of judgment, or personal authority, that evaluates and makes choices about external expectations" (Kegan and Lahey, p. 63). This means that individuals with a Self-Authoring mind are able to detach from their social context, forming personal values and making decisions based on their own beliefs.

Kegan and Lahey further explain, "Our self coheres by its alignment with its own belief system, ideology, or personal code; by its ability to self-direct, take stands, set limits, and create and regulate its boundaries on behalf of its own voice" (Kegan and Lahey, p. 63). This extends the previous idea by emphasizing the importance of personal boundaries and beliefs, which help define and strengthen the Self-Authoring mind within the stages of adult development.
