= Residence hall director =

A residence hall director is college or university employee generally responsible for the management and daily operations of campus residence halls. While the term residence hall director is the common title used for this position in the United States, they are also known at different schools as area coordinators, area directors, hall coordinators, community directors, hall directors, resident or residence directors, resident deans, residence hall coordinators, or residence life coordinators. While different titles are used by different colleges and universities, the positions generally have similar job requirements, dependent upon the size of the institution and scope of the position's overarching department.

== Qualifications ==
Although not universal, some universities require residence hall directors to have earned the minimum of a bachelor's degree (common at many institutions in Canada), while most others require a master's degree in college student personnel, higher education, or another related or relevant field (more prevalent in the United States). Some universities fill the residence hall director positions with graduate students who are only part time and may be required to complete fewer tasks or are responsible for smaller residential areas. There are also institutions that hire undergraduate students for the position. These students are often overseen by an area coordinator or a mid-level student affairs officer.

== Responsibilities ==
The main responsibility of the hall director is the direct supervision of resident assistants (RAs). Often carrying out the training of the RAs themselves, residence hall directors meet frequently with their RAs to ensure the residence hall community is healthy and operating smoothly.

In addition to meeting and managing the RAs and any other hall staff, residence hall directors frequently (depending on the university) have many of the following responsibilities:

- manage the hall secretaries and custodian staff
- teach sections of transfer or first-year seminar classes
- oversee the judicial process of residence students ranging from fines, behavioral contracts, community service to eviction.
- provide counseling to student residents
- refer residents to proper campus offices and support services
- plan and implement social activities
- advise the Hall Council
- provide crisis support to parents and students
- coordinate emergency/crisis response to the rest of the University
- serve as a liaison to university officials and law enforcement personnel
- enforce hall behavior codes and meet with students who break policies
- general administrative work for the hall
- mediate roommate conflicts and oversee room change process.
- manage a budget for the community/communities they oversee

Another aspect of being a residence hall director is that they also tend to live in the hall or a separate adjoining apartment. They also tend to participate in an on-call crisis response rotation where they may be called by RAs, campus public safety, or other staff members if problems arise needing professional attention.
