= National Residence Hall Honorary =

American collegiate honor society

- NRHH
- Founded: April 25, 1964; 62 years ago University of Denver
- Type: Honor
- Affiliation: NACURH
- Status: Active
- Emphasis: College residential life
- Scope: North America
- Motto: "Leadership, Service, Recognition"
- Pillars: Leadership, Service, Scholastics, Recognition
- Colors: Blue and White
- Symbol: Diamond, NACURH Three Links
- Chapters: 243
- Headquarters: Residence Life & Housing Department; 310 Haines Street; Newark, Delaware 19717; United States
- Website: www.nrhh.nacurh.org

"National Residence Hall Honorary". Iowa State University.

The National Residence Hall Honorary (NRHH) is a North American honor society dedicated to recognizing leaders in collegiate residence halls. It was founded in 1964 at the University of Denver in Denver, Colorado. It is a branch of Association of College and University Residence Halls.

== History ==
In 1964, the National Association of College and University Residence Halls (NACURH) became financially unstable. Jim Tschechtelin, NACURH chair, began investing potential revenue sources and grants. To obtain these grants, NACURH needed to create a central office and provide more services to member schools.

As a result, NACURH formed the National Residence Hall Honorary (NRHH) in on April 24, 1964, during the NACURH annual conference at the University of Denver. NRHH was formed to recognize students who make a positive contribution to campus resident hall leaders. Initially, NRHH acquired chapters by converting previously existing NACURH campus chapters.

Between 1977 and 1987, NRHH started providing pins and certificates for initiates and hosting regional and national induction receptions. Additionally, the society began actively recruiting new chapters.

NRHH was supervised at the national level by the NRHH National Office until it was replaced by the NACURH Services and Recognition Office (NSRO) in 2006. Most of the NSRO functions were the same as the former office, except that NRHH chapters affiliated with the NACURH Information Center (NIC) along with their respective schools residence hall association (RHA). Today, the NSRO and NIC have been replaced by the NACURH Corporate Office, which has absorbed the responsibilities of the former offices and primarily serves as the corporate hub for affiliation and merchandise. Its offices are in Newark, Delaware.

== Symbols ==
The NRHH crest or logo is the NRHH Diamond, which includes the letters and name of the society, along with three interconnected links. The diamond shape symbolizes the diamond gemstone and the value of the beauty of the residence hall experience. The links represent the chain of leadership, specifically, the skills of caring, dedication, and participation.

The society's membership pin is a replica of the NRHH Diamond. NRHH also has an outstanding leadership pin, awarded as the NRHH's highest honor for service.

NRHH's motto is "Leadership, Service, Recognition". Its pillars are leadership, service, scholastics, and recognition. The society's colors are blue and white, with blue representing loyalty to purpose and idea and white symbolizing a blank page where students can write about their experiences in residence hall.

== Activities ==
NRHH hosts regional and national conventions and a spring leadership conference. At the campus level, members participate in professional development and service activities. The society's national service projects include the NACURH Alternative Spring Break Trip and the NACURH NRHH Day of Service. The society recognizes staff of the residential community through its Of the Month and Of the Year award program. Chapters also award an annual Outstanding Service Award.

== Membership ==
Members of the NRHH represent the top one percent of student leaders who live in campus residence halls. Membership is open to undergraduate, graduate, and professional degree-seeking students who live in campus housing for one semester at an institution with an NRHH chapter. Potential members must have at least a 2.5 GPA and "have made positive contributions to the residence hall system through engagement with the values of service and recognition." Membership in NRHH is for life.

== Governance ==
NRHH is a branch of .Association of College and University Residence Halls. At the close of the NACURH 2008 conference, NRHH became more connected with the NACURH corporate structure through the creation of the NACURH Associate for NRHH position, which was added as a full member of the NACURH Executive Committee, as well as the NACURH Board of Directors. This position serves as the executive director of the honorary and oversees all of the regional associate directors for NRHH who serve as executive officers of the honorary for their regional constituencies. Together, the NACURH Associate and Regional Associate Directors for NRHH form the NACURH NRHH Board of Directors, which serves as the international governing body of the honorary.

== Chapters ==
During the 2018–2019 academic year, the society had 243 active chapters.

== Notable members ==
- Morgan Hicks, sport shooter
- Debbie Wasserman Schultz, United States House of Representatives
- Shawkat Toorawa (honorary), a Professor of Arabic Literature at Yale University

== See also ==
- Honor cords
