= Resident assistant =

Overseer in student residences and student bodies

Resident Assistant
Occupation
- Activity sectors: Education

Description
- Competencies: Communication, organization, planning
- Fields of employment: Student affairs
- Related jobs: Coach, tutor

A resident assistant (RA), also known by a variety of other names, (Note: A resident assistant may be referred to as a house fellow, resident (or residential) advisor, community assistant, resident mentor, residence don, peer advisor, community advisor, collegiate fellow, proctor, resident tutor or senior resident.) is a trained peer leader who coordinates activities in residence halls in colleges and universities, mental health and substance abuse residential facilities, or similar establishments.

An RA has many roles and responsibilities, including building a residential community through programming, acting as a mentor for students, being a familiar first resource for students with academic or institutional questions, and enforcing residence policies. RAs assist residents with problem solving or refer them to counseling resources. Above all, a resident assistant must be an example and uphold professional and personal accountability as outlined by the institution.

At post-secondary institutions RAs are often undergraduate or graduate students themselves, and must balance their schedule and priorities with the needs of the students they are supporting. RAs must balance their own personal and academic needs while ensuring they are supporting and fostering community among residents, connecting residents with resources, and providing enriching programming. RAs will often report to a residence hall director, or another professional staff member within the Residence Life unit.

A major component of the job is not only creating a community, but also ensuring safety for all, for example, by participating in nightly community walks. Other duties held by RAs outside of community building and programming can include ordering supplies, managing a budget, and determining need for maintenance, repairs, and furnishings. They may maintain household records and assign rooms.

== Job benefits ==
According to the United States Bureau of Labor Statistics, the national mean hourly wage of an RA was $13.87 in 2017, and the national mean average annual wage was $28,850. An RA at a college or university does not typically receive an hourly wage, but is compensated in other ways. Common compensations are price-adjusted or free room, free board, and/or stipends.

=== Unionization ===
Resident Assistants at some institutions have unionized to secure stronger benefits. Examples have included:

- Columbia University
- Barnard College
- Tufts University
- Swarthmore College
- Wesleyan University
- Emerson College
- Georgetown University
- Bucknell University
- Drexel University
- University of Pennsylvania
- Fordham University
- Rensselaer Polytechnic Institute

In unionizing progress:

- Temple University

== Job duties and responsibilities ==
Each institution has its own duties and requirements for an RA. The following are the more common responsibilities of an RA.

=== Administrative ===
An RA is often asked to be a liaison between the resident community of which they are a part and the residence hall director of the building. This often requires writing reports, keeping accurate records, completing timely follow-up, and maintaining good communication. RAs are usually required to meet with their building coordinator weekly or bi-weekly to discuss their residents, planned programming, and any other issues or subjects that could affect the ability to perform their administrative responsibilities. The RA may also assist with public relations and housing needs such as submitting facilities concerns for review and collecting information about resident move out.

=== Community ===
The residents and the RA compose a community, simply by living together in a similar location. The RA may be required to foster this community by mentoring and encouraging the residents be tolerant and respectful of the other residents and their property. They often facilitate programming to create a sense of community and belonging on the floor or in the building. This programming is meant to bring a greater sense of community, with many institutions having strong community pride within residence halls in the form of mascots and traditions. Further, RAs are often expected to be positive role models within their communities. They are to act as role models of the standards put in place by the institution by demonstrating: academic integrity, respect for diversity and inclusion, and prioritizing community integration or participation.

=== Interpersonal ===
These duties deal with directly helping the residents as individuals. This requires the RA to know all the residents and be able to help each resident if they run into any problems with each other as well as with other things that may follow. Some problems could pertain to relationships, classwork, or institutional questions. The RA should have the skills to either assist the resident, or know of a resource that the resident can use to solve their problem. A large portion of an RA's role is not to be the expert in supporting students with all of their needs, but rather to have the knowledge and ability to identify when a resident is in need of support and refer residents to other resources that can support them such as counselling services, academic advising, etc.

=== Security ===
These duties involve creating a safe and healthy environment for the residents to reside in. Many institutions require RAs to participate in a 'on duty' rotation where they actively walk through and monitor communities throughout the night. While completing these nightly rounds, enforcing community standards, such as quiet hours and alcohol and drug policy are frequent occurrences. Fines, bonds, and behavioural contracts can be issued at many universities by RAs as a result but at other institutions RAs are only required to address and document concerns and professional staff such as residence hall directors complete the follow-up for community standard infractions. Monitoring floor activity and helping with conflict resolution between residents is another important security related duty of the RA. As more institutions take on a curricular approach and put learning at the forefront of their practice, many RAs are encouraged to have an educational-based conversation with students and focus on restoration and not reprimand them. Finally, while completing their nightly walk throughs RAs are often asked to check on the physical security of residence halls, ensuring doors are locked and there are no facilities concerns that need to be addressed.

=== Integration ===
This refers to assisting residents in making a smooth transition into campus life by getting them involved in traditional activities in their institution such as homecoming events, for example. Many RAs are asked to help first-year residence students transition campus and academic life, providing orientation to campus services and being available for questions and support throughout the academic terms. Further, when residents move out of residence halls RAs help support their integration into the broader campus community.

=== Academic and awareness ===
This refers to academic development and social awareness. Resident assistants are there to promote the well-being of residents in university housing, and to make sure that residents feel like they have enough resources available to them and know how to use them. RAs may try to teach students about social justice and inclusivity, and take students to places on campus where they can learn more about social justice and groups with differing identities. RAs can show students where to go when they need academic help or advice, and can even offer advice of their own as they are often older students with more experience.

=== Identity ===
This refers to the personal development of residents that enables them to gain a level of self-awareness. This can be fostered through student development theory frameworks such as Sanford's theory of challenge and support and Kolb's theory of experiential learning.

=== Independence ===
Resident assistants must encourage the development of life skills and personal accountability amongst the residents. This may be through RAs teaching skills such as how to do laundry or cook, or bringing in additional resources such as career centres to support residents in learning how to make a cover letters or excel at job interviews.

=== Programs ===
One way many of these elements can be achieved is through programming. This is a major aspect of the job for a resident assistant. Programming can come in three different forms. This includes planned, passive, and take. A planned program is an event created or co-sponsored by the resident assistant. This event is specifically tailored to fit the needs and/or interests of the residents. Sometimes RAs are required to have one planned event for their residents a month, as well as contribute to a building program once a semester in which they work with other RAs to create a meaningful program for the whole building. A passive program is one that is completed without assembling or direct interaction between the residents and/or the resident assistant. Passive programs are generally used to start a conversation on a particular issue affecting the residents. These programs can range from a bulletin board that can be casually read in passing, or they can be more interactive like taking a survey, for example. Finally, take programs require the resident assistant to accompany residents to an event which can include an on-campus program such as an institution sponsored event, a basketball game or perhaps a movie. All these programs help to develop a community amongst residents and incorporate the core values mentioned above.

Active Program Ideas: Mocktails (alcohol safety), Condom Olympics (sex ed), DIY air fresheners with baking soda and essential oils (Hygiene), DIY Tote bags from old t- shirts (Sustainability), Ice-cream Social (Icebreaker), BJ's and PJS- Ben and Jerrys (Sex education), Paint Nite (Alcohol safety).

Passive Program Ideas: Making a door dec (decoration) representative for that month (bunnies in March, ornaments in December, pumpkins in October), going door to door and handing out candy/ taping candy on their door, an interactive bulletin board where they can write countries they've been or what they're thankful for in November.

=== Institution-specific ===
These duties are designated from the values and goals of the institution. This denotes that the RA should be a role model by following the regulations. In addition, the RA could be required to disseminate, explain, and uphold these regulations.

At the University of Illinois Urbana-Champaign, resident advisors are role models, peer advisors, resource referrals, student advocates, and educators. RAs assume leadership roles in creating a positive and friendly atmosphere for students of varied backgrounds. RAs at Illinois develop relationships with their residents on a personal level and try to become a resource to each of them. An RA at Illinois is responsible for a floor of residents, and creates programs and activities for their floor throughout the semester. RAs can point residents in the right direction and help them solve problems by referring them to departments on campus for more extensive help with certain issues. RAs also make sure to address the needs of underrepresented groups of students and work with other staff to incorporate the needs and wishes of these student groups into the community model.

At Illinois, RAs are compensated with waived fees for housing and meal plans, and are given a monthly stipend of roughly $105.00. RAs have nights where they are on duty, and must complete procedures such as checking the security of the building, making sure residents in the residence halls are safe and don’t have any unaddressed concerns, and be available to anyone who is having problems or needs help with something.

The role of an RA is to create a community among their residents that is inclusive, welcoming, and comfortable environment for students who are living in university housing. Creating a social and welcoming living space is important for students getting acclimated to a new setting (the college campus) and making sure students feel at home.

== International ==
=== Singapore ===
At the National University of Singapore, there are cluster leaders, resident assistants, and members of the Junior Common Room Committee (JCRC). Cluster leaders help keep students within their "cluster", which are students on their floor, safe and healthy. They work alongside resident assistants (RAs) to work towards creating a safe and inclusive community for students. RAs are given training in areas such as crisis management, event organization, CPR and AED training, and presentation skills. The JCRC is a student body council made up of elected undergraduate students to help plan events and make sure that students within the residence have a say in what happens around them. Within this committee, there are 9 to 11 potential positions for each residence hall.

=== Mexico ===
In Mexico, resident assistants are typically called "prefectos". The position has many of the same functions as in the USA, with a few exceptions including taking attendance every night at 11:30pm. The residence halls tend to be mainly of the same sex; therefore attendance is taken every night by a resident assistant to ensure opposite sex guests are no longer in the building.

=== United Kingdom ===
Positions similar to resident assistants are much rarer in the UK than the USA, reflecting British universities taking much less direct interest in their student's personal, social and sporting life than their American equivalents. It is more common to have a professional manager, supported by a team of student assistants, whose role focuses on duties covering security, fire and first-aid along with night/weekend reception. However, some UK universities do have a similar role to that of the resident assistant in the USA. These are often called "senior wardens", "student wardens" or "senior mentors". Such positions do not generally much focus on improvement of student life, and are instead more directed towards pastoral care of residents along with practical responsibilities. The positions are most often filled by graduate students or sometimes undergraduate students from their second year of study on.

== Notable RAs ==
- Anthony Bradley, theology professor at The King's College – Clemson University
- Ryan C. Clark, RA at Virginia Tech, killed in the 2007 Virginia Tech shooting.
- Hillary Clinton – Wellesley College, United States senator, former first lady of the United States, 2008 and 2016 presidential candidate and former United States secretary of state
- Katie Couric, Today, CBS Evening News, Katie – University of Virginia
- Mike Ditka – University of Pittsburgh
- Robert Gates, former United States secretary of defense, former president of Texas A&M University, former director of Central Intelligence – College of William & Mary
- Donald Glover, actor/comedian/writer/rapper – New York University
- Joanie Laurer, aka Chyna from the WWE – University of Tampa
- Michael Craig-Martin, artist
- Terry McAuliffe, 72nd governor of Virginia, former chairman of the Democratic National Committee
- Jerry O'Connell, actor (Sliders, Las Vegas, Jerry Maguire, Stand by Me) – New York University
- Paul Reiser, actor – Binghamton University, Binghamton, NY
- Tom Reynolds – University of Maryland, College Park, author and host of The Complete Guide to Everything
- Adam Sandler, actor – New York University
- Donna Shalala, president of the University of Miami, former U.S. secretary of health and human services for the Clinton Administration – Syracuse University
- Wesley Snipes, actor – SUNY Purchase
- Kerry Washington, actor – George Washington University
- Open Mike Eagle, hip hop artist and comedian – Southern Illinois University Carbondale

== See also ==
- Residence hall director
- Residential fellow
