= List of Flinders University people =

This is an incomplete list of Flinders University people including notable alumni and staff associated with the Flinders University in Adelaide, South Australia.

Graduates of Flinders University include:

- Australian of the Year: Richard Harris
- Fields Medalist (for maths): Terry Tao
- Several Rhodes scholars

Other notable people include:

== Administration (1966–present) ==
=== Chancellors ===
No.	Chancellor	Commenced	Concluded	Ref.
1	Sir Mark Ledingham Mitchell	1966	1970	
2	Sir Charles Hart Bright	1971	1983	
3	Francis Robert Fisher	1983	1988	
4	Deirdre Jordan	1988	2002	
5	Sir Eric Neal	2002	2010	
6	Stephen Gerlach	2010	2023	
7	John Hood	2023	incumbent	

=== Vice-Chancellors ===
No.	Vice-Chancellor	Commenced	Concluded	Ref.
1	Peter Karmel	1966	1971	
2	Roger Wolcott Russell	1972	1979	
3	Keith Jackson Hancock	1980	1987	
4	John Francis Lovering	1987	1995	
5	Ian Chubb	1995	2000	
6	Anne Rosalie Edwards	2001	2007	
7	Michael Barber	2008	2014	
8	Colin Stirling	2015	incumbent	

=== Interim vice-chancellors ===
No.	Acting Vice-Chancellor	Commenced	Concluded	Ref.
1	Avon Maxwell (Max) Clark	1973	1973	
2	Brian Abrahamson	Feb 1987	Jun 1987	
3	Chris Marlin	2005	2005	
4	Dean Forbes (intermittent)	2000	2013	
5	David Day	2014	2014	
6	Andrew Parkin	2015	2015	
7	Robert Saint (intermittent)	2015	2022	
8	Phyllis Tharenou	2019	2019	
9	Clare Pollock (intermittent)	2019	2020	
10	Alistair Rendell	after 2019	before 2025	
11	Ray Chan (intermittent)	2024	2025	
12	Romy Lawson (intermittent)	Jul 2025	Dec 2025	

== Governance (1966–present) ==
=== Pro-Chancellors ===
No.	Pro-Chancellor	Commenced	Concluded	Ref.
1	Sir Charles Bright	1966	1971	
2	Bernard Augustin Cosgrove	1971	1974	
3	Francis Fisher	1975	1983	
4	Arthur Royston Griffiths	1979	1981	
5	Deirdre Jordan	1981	1988	
6	Max Clark	1984	1991	
7	John Doyle	1988	2000	
8	Ronald David Barnes	1992	1998	
9	Ian Arthur Chesterman	1998	2005	
10	Judith Mary Roberts	2001	2005	

=== Deputy Chancellors ===
No.	Deputy Chancellor	Commenced	Concluded	Ref.
1	Ian Chesterman	2005	2006	
2	Judith Roberts	2005	2008	
3	Ian Garth Yates	2007	2014	
4	Leonie Jane Clyne	2009	2016	
5	Stephen Charles Hains	2015	2023	
6	Elizabeth Diana Perry	2016	2024	
7	Douglas Gautier	2023	2025	
8	Leanne Maree Liddle	2025	incumbent	

== Arts and humanities ==
=== Creatives ===
- Mario Andreacchio – film director and producer
- Michael Atkinson – (founding member of Redgum)
- Benedict Andrews – theatre director (Flinders Drama Centre)
- Mem Fox – children's author
- Alex Frayne – film director
- Gale Edwards – Theatre Director (Flinders Drama Centre)
- Nuala Hafner – TV presenter (Flinders Drama Centre)
- Noni Hazlehurst – actress (Flinders Drama Centre)
- Scott Hicks – film director (Flinders Drama Centre)
- Victoria Hill – actress, writer and producer (Flinders Drama Centre)
- Nicholas Hope – actor (Flinders Drama Centre)
- Aimee Horne – actress and singer
- Jackie Huggins – author, historian, Aboriginal rights advocate, and academic
- Sophie Hyde – filmmaker, of Closer Productions
- Paul Kelly – (1973; did not complete)
- Hannah Kent – author, winner of the Stella Prize
- Steve Knapman – TV producer (Flinders Drama Centre)
- Craig Lahiff – film director
- Nina Landis – actress
- Verity Laughton – playwright (PhD, Creative Arts thesis, 2020)
- Caleb Lewis – playwright (Flinders Drama Centre)
- Sam Mac – radio and television personality
- Anthony Maras – film director, writer and producer
- Peter Martin – economics journalist and commentator (Distinguished Alumnus 2016)
- Louisa Mignone – actress
- Sudesh Mishra – poet
- Susan Mitchell – author (Flinders Drama Centre)
- Doc Neeson – singer, songwriter, and front man of The Angels
- Tania Nehme – film editor (Flinders Drama Centre, 1983)
- Christopher Pearson – journalist, founder of the Adelaide Review and speechwriter for Prime Minister John Howard
- Mark Peel – Australian historian
- Greig Pickhaver (also known as H.G. Nelson) – actor, comedian and writer (Flinders Drama Centre)
- Michael Pope – TV presenter and producer (Flinders Drama Centre)
- Damien Richardson – actor (Flinders Drama Centre)
- Xavier Samuel – actor (Flinders Drama Centre)
- John Schumann – founding member of Redgum
- Wendy Strehlow – actress
- Rebecca Summerton – film producer
- Chris Timms – founding member of Redgum
- Melanie Vallejo – actress (Flinders Drama Centre)
- Matt Vesely – filmmaker, of Closer Productions
- Eddie White – animation writer and director(Flinders Drama Centre)
- Sean Williams – author

=== Academics ===
- Jack Barbalet – professor of sociology
- Carl Bridge – professor of history at King's College London
- Wal Cherry (1932–1986), foundation professor of Flinders Drama Centre,
- Jackie Huggins – author, historian, Aboriginal rights advocate, and academic
- Marion Jones – nursing and interprofessional practice academic (PhD, 2000)
- Marion Maddox – author and professor of history at Macquarie University
- Haydon Manning – political scientist (PhD1994; later, associate professor, Politics and Public Policy at Flinders)
- Andrekos Varnava – writer and professor of history
- Wesley Wildman – professor of theology at Boston University
- Graham Hill – associate professor of missiology and World Christianity at the University of Divinity, Australia

== Science and medicine ==
=== Medicine ===
- Nazira Abdula – pediatrician and Mozambican Minister of Health
- Richard "Harry" Harris – anaesthetist and 2019 Australian of the Year
- Sally Goold – first Indigenous nurse in New South Wales and 2006 Senior Nurse of the Year
- Philip Nitschke – (PhD in applied physics)

=== Other sciences ===
- Rod Boswell – professor, Plasma Research Laboratory, ANU
- Philip Bourne – professor of pharmacology at UCSD
- Rodney Brooks – professor of robotics at MIT
- Tracy Dawes-Gromadzki - termite expert
- Sabine Dittmann – marine biologist
- Mohammad Kaykobad – computer scientist, professor of CSE, BUET
- Mamoru Mohri – retired astronaut, scientist and engineer
- Colin Raston – professor of green chemistry, SA Scientist of the Year inventor of the Vortex Fluidic Device
- Cori Stewart – associate professor and innovator, Women in AI: manufacturing, winner 2022
- Terence Tao – Fields Medalist, professor of mathematics at UCLA
- Tony Thomas – professor of physics at the University of Adelaide

== Politics ==
- John Bannon – former South Australian premier
- Zoe Bettison – South Australian state politician and minister
- Susan Close – South Australian state politician, minister and deputy premier
- David Cox – Member of the Australian House of Representatives
- Kate Ellis – Member of the Australian House of Representatives and minister
- Chris Gallus – Federal politician for the Liberal Party
- Bronwyn Halfpenny – Member of the Victorian Legislative Assembly
- Don Hopgood – (PhD) Deputy Premier of South Australia from 1985 to 1992
- Ian Hunter – South Australian state politician and minister
- Tom Kenyon – South Australian state politician and minister
- Stephanie Key – South Australian state politician and minister
- Jenny Leong – Member of the New South Wales Legislative Assembly
- Brendan Nelson – former Australian leader of the opposition
- Chris Picton – South Australian state politician and minister
- Mike Rann – former premier, appointed as a Flinders University professor
- Amanda Rishworth – Member of the Australian House of Representatives
- Don Russell – former Australian ambassador to the United States
- Robert Simms – Australian senator
- Andrew Southcott – Member of the Australian House of Representatives
- Gayle Tierney – Member of the Victorian Legislative Council
- Sialeʻataonga Tuʻivakanō – Prime Minister of Tonga
- Lynne Walker – Northern Territory deputy leader of the opposition
- Pratikno – Minister of State Secretariat of the Republic of Indonesia
- Nicolle Flint – Member of the Australian House of Representatives

== Sport ==
- Matthew Liptak – Adelaide Crows footballer
- Agnes Milowka – technical diver and author
- Nigel Smart – Adelaide Crows footballer

== Faculty ==
- Max Brennan – physicist
- Donald Brook (1927–2018) – artist; founder of the Experimental Art Foundation; inaugural professor of fine arts; after retirement in 1989, emeritus professor
- Elena Carapetis – actor and playwright; lecturer at Flinders Drama Centre
- Rosalba Clemente – actor; head of Flinders Drama Centre as of 2024
- Roz Hervey (1965/67–2024) – dancer, choreographer, artistic and creative director; taught movement at Flinders Drama Centre
- Jeri Kroll – poet and author, inaugural dean of graduate research, later emeritus professor
- Caleb Lewis – playwright; lecturer at Flinders Drama Centre
- Haydon Manning – political scientist (PhD 1994); associate professor, politics and public policy
- Genevieve Mooy – film director; lecturer at Flinders Drama Centre
- Mike Rann – professorial fellow in social and policy studies, 2012–?
- James Toouli – surgeon

== See also ==
- Category:Flinders University alumni
