= Snake Oil (TV series) =

American television game show

- Genre: Game show
- Presented by: David Spade
- Country of origin: United States
- Original language: English
- No. of seasons: 1
- No. of episodes: 10

Production
- Executive producers: Will Arnett; Marc Forman; Neal Konstantini
- Producer: David Spade
- Camera setup: Multi-camera
- Production companies: Fox Alternative Entertainment; Electric Avenue

Original release
- Network: Fox
- Release: September 27 – December 13, 2023

Snake Oil is an American game show which aired from September 27 to December 13, 2023, on Fox. The show is hosted and produced by David Spade.

Contestants and their celebrity advisors are asked to separate legitimate inventions from made-up ones.

== Format ==
Contestants on the show begin with a "bank" of $50,000 which they can choose to invest in a selection of eight different products which are presented to them by entrepreneurs at the beginning of the show. The products presented to the contestants are a combination of real products and fake products, or "snake oil". Contestants must decide which products are legitimate ventures. Winning contestants receive up to $220,000 for correctly guessing which products are real and which are snake oil, contingent on their score going into the final round and how much of a risk they choose to take. If the contestant finds out the other player made a mistake and picked a Snake Oil product they can choose to poach the product which is real and bank the money to prevent it from being lost.

== Production ==
On April 18, 2023, it was announced that Fox had ordered the series, with David Spade as the host. Spade also serves as the producer. On July 11, 2023, it was announced that Snake Oil would premiere on September 26, after the tenth season premiere of The Masked Singer. On August 28, 2023, the guest celebrity advisors for the show were announced.

== Episodes ==
No.	Title	Original release date	Prod. code	U.S. viewers (millions)	Rating (18-49)
1	"Rob Riggle and Michelle Williams" "For Goodness Snake"	September 27, 2023	SNA-109	1.79	0.4/4
"Baby Trinket Bracelets" jewelry made from your child's baby teeth and hair (SNAKE OIL); "The Deer Slayer" world's first meat infused whiskey (REAL) "Smith'i Tie Protector" disposable tie protector (REAL) (POACHED); "North Meets South" dating app to match you with your polar opposite (SNAKE OIL) "Irresistible Wax" wax melts that imitate your favorite foods (REAL); "Scrubbies the Blowfish" robotic scrubber that cleans your toilet (SNAKE OIL) "My Pampered Feet" foot towel to dry between your toes (REAL); "Soap Faces" 3-D soap face sculptures (SNAKE OIL) "Swim Airs" inflatable swimwear for adults (SNAKE OIL) "Runbell" bicycle bell that you wear on your fingers (REAL) "Can Go Smart Cane" optimize your cane walking (REAL) "Kool Breeze Solar Hat" 100% solar powered fan in a hat (REAL)
2	"Adam DeVine and Dwight Howard"	October 4, 2023	SNA-107	1.89	0.3/4
"The Studly Stud Finder" the stud finder that looks like a sexy man (SNAKE OIL); "Pigcasso" painted masterpieces by a pig (REAL) "The Man Fork" the fork for men (REAL); "Turner's Mattress Turners" door-to-door service that flips your mattress for you (SNAKE OIL) "Fridge Lok 2.0" smart fridge that lets you reach your fitness goals by locking you out of the junk foods (SNAKE OIL); "Eyebandz" the headband that's also eyeglasses (REAL) "Bond Heart" pendant that allows you to store and feel your loved one's heartbeat (REAL); "Chili Con Carnivore" exotic chili made with exotic meats (SNAKE OIL) "Knob Hoodies" the hooded sweatshirt your gear shift can wear (REAL) "That's Our Baby" detailed images of your future baby (SNAKE OIL) "Re-Timer" light therapy for better sleep (REAL) "Miss Fortunes Cookies" the cookies are sweet, the fortunes are salty (REAL) "Subsoccer" the only way to play soccer without getting off your butt (REAL)
3	"Bethenny Frankel and Jay Pharoah"	October 11, 2023	SNA-106	1.47	0.2/2
"Al Dente" the pasta timer that sings tunes to signify you when the pasta is ready (REAL); "Doggily Ever After" wedding service for dogs (SNAKE OIL) "My Heart Is Yours" jewelry line with preserved rodent hearts (REAL); "Ash-and-Sketch" sketches from your loved one's ashes (SNAKE OIL) "Tap That Ass" party service that brings a donkey carrying a keg to your next big event (SNAKE OIL); "Grocery Vest" vest that helps carry up to 200 pounds of groceries (REAL) "Kuma Comfort" bear shaped body pillow that you can hug (SNAKE OIL); "Rodeo Core" low-impact home-exercise machine (REAL) "Bike Pretty" Danish designed bike helmet (REAL) "Baby Synthesizer" synthesizer inside a recycled baby-doll (REAL) "Chilly Mouth Experience" world's most unapologetically intense toothpaste (REAL) "Pan Buddy" BPA-Free attachment for heavy cookware (REAL) "The Shower Lounger" shower safe inflatable lounge-chair (SNAKE OIL)
4	"Will Arnett and Brad Paisley"	October 18, 2023	SNA-101	1.75	0.3/3
"Elegant Pets" luxury wigs for pets (REAL); "Jamaican Rum Gum" alcohol-infused chewing gum that takes you straight to the islands (SNAKE OIL) "Lil' Mommies" the fake baby bump for little girls (SNAKE OIL); "Loud Mouth Ashtrays" the handmade ashtray molded from real teeth (REAL) (POACHED) "Boost" the Kegel exercise trainer for men (REAL); "The Quiet Cutter" silent mower that cuts grass with lasers (SNAKE OIL) "Mr. Short House" the high security gnome that protects your home (SNAKE OIL); "Croccoons" customized footwear made from real raccoons (REAL) "Happy Headrest" the headrest for your airline seat (REAL) "Suzie Q's Pool Table Urns" the urn modeled after a pool table (REAL) "Mo'cycle Airbag Jeans" the safety jeans outfitted with an airbag (REAL) "Lit Bread" the candelabra made from challah bread (SNAKE OIL) "Black Ivory Coffee Company" premium coffee beans from elephant dung (REAL)
5	"Ice-T and Natasha Leggero"	October 25, 2023	SNA-104	1.60	0.3/3
"Luggage Gone Wild" one-of-a-kind taxidermy luggage (SNAKE OIL); "Alibi Agency" helps clients maintain their lies with fake alibis for any excuse (REAL) "That's What She Said" app with advice for men by women (SNAKE OIL); "The Sick Buddy" premium toilet cushion for vomiting (REAL) (POACHED) "Frank's Angry Art" custom revenge art (SNAKE OIL); "RainbowLuvPets" crochet sweaters for your reptile pets (REAL) "Yummy Covers" scented vent covers (SNAKE OIL); "Candwich" peanut butter and jelly sandwich kit in a can (REAL) "Selfie Feet" take selfies with your feet (REAL) "The Kanso Dryer" dryer that automatically folds your clothes (SNAKE OIL) "Clean Up On Aisle Wine" elegant wine glass with a built in straw (REAL) "Moss Bath Mat" bath mat made from all natural moss (REAL) "Defender Bro" the sports bra for men (REAL)
6	"Kandi Burruss and JB Smoove"	November 8, 2023	SNA-102	1.41	0.2/2
"Food Crayon" edible spice crayon (REAL); "TANgerine Tea" world's first drinkable tan (SNAKE OIL) "Wingerz" disposable stickers that keep your fingers clean (REAL); "Forever Car" miniature replica car (SNAKE OIL) "SinkTwice" revolutionary toilet tank sink to wash your hands (REAL); "Anzen Safe Space" in-home soundproof getaway pod (SNAKE OIL) "Nate's Twin Mutt Cutts" unique service that gives matching haircuts to you and your dog (SNAKE OIL); "My Perfect Goatee" shaving template for the perfect goatee (REAL) "Metadox (The Phasma)" soundproof mask for gamers (REAL) "Cryptic Creatures Taxidermy" epic, unique taxidermy pieces (REAL) "Air Gordon" air-fryer preloaded with ten Gordon Ramsay one-liners (SNAKE OIL) "Mattress Jack" lifts your entire mattress so you can make the bed better (REAL) "Chop Fit" functional, weighted training axe (REAL)
7	"Return of Bethenny and Jay" "Bethenny Frankel and Jay Pharoah"	November 15, 2023	SNA-105	1.39	0.3/3
"Mouser" cat food with real blended mice (REAL); "Oscar's Cow Milk Drive Thru" fresh unpasteurized milk straight from the udder (SNAKE OIL) (POACHED) "UberGraft Solutions" harvest and regrow your hair in a lab (SNAKE OIL); "Quiet Frame" analog device for taking mental pictures (REAL) "Power Prunes" ancient Chinese prunes that supercharge your whole body (SNAKE OIL); "Respiray" wearable technology for allergen free air (REAL) "Scuba Doo" service that takes your dog scuba diving (SNAKE OIL); "Vaportini" revolutionary drinking glass that allows you to inhale alcohol (REAL) "ElectricCollectics Toad Purse" purses made from sugar cane toads (REAL) "Rotary Un-Smartphone Kit" build your own rotary phone from scratch (REAL) "Whine & Wine Time" the wine glass for whiners (SNAKE OIL) "Your Face in a Jar" the jar you can put your face in (REAL) "Never Let Go Mittens" a mitten for parents and kids to share (REAL)
8	"Return of Natasha and Ice-T" "Natasha Leggero and Ice-T"	November 29, 2023	SNA-103	1.20	0.2/2
"Cheerable" app that gives you personal hype crew on demand to boost your confidence (SNAKE OIL) (POACHED); "SpoonTEK" the spoon that uses ion technology to enhance flavor and improve aftertaste (REAL) "Source Purifier" a bottle that turns urine into drinking water (SNAKE OIL); "Spacruzzi" luxury hot tub boat (REAL) "My-Glo" lighting lamps made from mushrooms (REAL); "Don't Waste Time Clock" the clock that tells you exactly how many hours you have left to live (SNAKE OIL) "Experience Tube" the fun fabric that you attach to your head to meld vibes and blow minds (REAL); "Dai Peng" skin cream from home-raised snails (SNAKE OIL) "Hotdogger" hot dog drill to secure your condiments (REAL) "Bliss & Bles" crystal-infused tee shirts (REAL) "The BevBox" redwood box wine dispenser (REAL) "The Ball Swing" hammock from recycled golf balls (SNAKE OIL)
9	"Rob Riggle and Christie Brinkley"	December 6, 2023	SNA-110	1.47	0.3/3
"Wut-A-Pickle" extraordinary flavored pickles (REAL) (POACHED); "The S.S. Scooter" the fastest scooter on land (SNAKE OIL) "CATch" a VR game to play with your cat (SNAKE OIL) (POACHED); "NakeFit" adhesive pad for the bottom of your feet (REAL) "Poppin' Pogos" a pogo stick with a built-in speaker that makes silly sounds with every bounce (SNAKE OIL); "Chicago Cuddle Therapy" virtual cuddle sessions (REAL) "Pigtailz" hair tie made from preserved pig tails (SNAKE OIL); "Magic Helper Hair Holder" an innovative tool that was created to hold braiding hair (REAL) "Huriia" umbrella holder (REAL) "SpreadTHAT" warming butter knife (REAL) "De Nir-O's" Robert De Niro breakfast cereal (SNAKE OIL) "Mummified Fairies" mummified fairies by WendigoOddities (REAL) "The Butterfly Hat" a beanie with an eye-mask attached (REAL)
10	"Darius Rucker and Adam DeVine"	December 13, 2023	SNA-108	1.24	0.2/3
"Celebrity Lost & Found Museum" lost & found items of the stars (SNAKE OIL); "PeeBall" point scoring game for your toilet (REAL) "Amagami Ham Ham" stuffed animal comfort robot (REAL) (POACHED); "Soup Chews" savory gummies that taste like soup (SNAKE OIL) "Zombie Party!" party with the undead (SNAKE OIL); "Mamma's Liquid Love" turns breast milk into jewelry keepsakes (REAL) "Fiddlehead Casket Company" build-it-yourself caskets (REAL); "Xianco Shells" Brazil's most delicious and decadent lobsters (SNAKE OIL) "The Foot Funnel" guide your foot into your shoe (REAL) "Alaskan Fish Butter" the taste of fish in your butter (SNAKE OIL) "Cattop" heated cat laptop (REAL) "Biker Beer Can Chicken Stand" keep your chicken up as it cooks (REAL) "Shower Wine Holder" wine glass holder for your shower (REAL)

== Reception ==
=== Critical response ===
The first season of the show was met with mixed reviews from critics. Decider's "Stream It or Skip It" review gave it a mostly positive review, commending its premise and contestants, but criticizing the runtime of an hour. It critiqued the program as being too long and felt the editing could have been improved in addition to the pacing of the show. Melissa Camacho of Common Sense Media praised the show's premise but found Spade to have low energy, giving Snake Oil 3 out of 5 stars overall.
