= Ray Chan =

Ray Chan or Raymond Chan may refer to:

- Raymond Chan (politician) (born 1951), Canadian politician
- Raymond Chan Chi-chuen (born 1972), Hong Kong politician, first openly gay member of the Legislative Council of Hong Kong
- Ray Chan (businessman) (born 1984), co-founder of 9GAG
- Ray Chan (academic), Australian oncology nurse
- Ray Chan (art director) (1967–2024), British art director and production designer

== See also ==
- Raymond Chang (disambiguation)
- Ray Chen (disambiguation)
