= Phyllis Tharenou =

Australian organisational psychologist

- Citizenship: Australian
- Title: Emerita Professor
- Awards: Elton Mayo Award (2001)

Academic work
- Discipline: Organisational psychology
- Sub-discipline: Career development, Gender studies
- Institutions: University of Queensland, Monash University, Flinders University

Phyllis Tharenou is an Australian organisational psychologist and management scholar whose research has focused on understanding women's career advancement, training and development effectiveness, and professionals' international careers. She is an Emerita Professor, having retired from full-time academic executive roles in 2021. Over a career spanning more than four decades, she combined research, teaching, senior academic leadership, and national research governance. She is widely cited for her contributions to the study of careers, gender and work, training and development, and influences on managerial advancement (e.g. mentor support, family structure and roles).

Tharenou served as Flinders University's acting vice-chancellor in mid-2019.

== Education and career ==
Tharenou began her academic career in the mid-1970s as a sessional lecturer while completing postgraduate study. In 1979, she was appointed as a teaching specialist at the Queensland Institute of Technology (QIT). During this period, she combined teaching with doctoral research and early scholarly publications on employee self-esteem in top journals of industrial/organizational (IO) psychology, such as the Journal of Applied Psychology and the Journal of Vocational Behavior.

In the late 1980s, she joined the University of Queensland as a lecturer, while also engaging in consulting and executive education. Her early research was published in international peer-reviewed journals in organisational behaviour and management, including the Journal of Organizational Behavior and the Academy of Management Journal. She also received an outstanding paper award from the Management Development Division at the Academy of Management annual meeting in the United States.

In the mid-1990s, Tharenou joined Monash University. Between 1994 and 2004, she was awarded four ARC Large or Discovery Grants as sole Chief Investigator.

Between the early 1990s and late 2000s, her research program focused on managerial career advancement, gender differences in careers, and linked work–family structure and flexible work practices, as well as on training and development (T&D) effectiveness.

Tharenou served as Executive Director of the Social, Behavioural and Economic Sciences (SBE) division at the Australian Research Council (ARC) from 2008 to 2009, following in 2005 to 2007 her chairing and membership of the SBE College of Experts.

From 2010 onward, Tharenou's research extended to international careers, beginning with the global mobility of self-initiated expatriates and later to other forms of global mobility, including skilled migration and the career advancement of skilled migrant and expatriate women. In doing so, her earlier research on managerial advancement, gender differences in career paths, and women in management was applied to international careers and skilled immigrants.

=== Executive university roles ===
In 2010, Tharenou returned to university leadership from government research leadership as Executive Dean of a large multidisciplinary faculty at Flinders University. She held additional senior executive appointments, including as acting dean of a business school alongside her executive dean role. Following institutional restructuring, she was appointed vice president and executive dean of a multidisciplinary faculty. After 11 years in full-time academic executive positions, she retired in 2021 and was awarded the title of Emerita Professor.

=== Editorial, professional, and practitioner service ===
Tharenou has held editorial roles in organisational psychology and management, serving as associate editor of Australian Psychologist, Applied Psychology: An International Review, and the Journal of Organizational Behavior. She has also served on editorial boards of major management and human resource journals and reviewed manuscripts for numerous international journals in industrial and organisational psychology, organisational behaviour, and human resource management. In addition, she has assessed applications for competitive research funding schemes as both a member of the College of Experts for Social, Behavioural and Economic Sciences and as its Chair.

== Research ==
=== Employee self-esteem and HRM research ===
Tharenou's (1979) cited review of employee self-esteem during her doctoral research advocates for the study of context-specific, organization-based self-esteem (OBSE) rather than global self-esteem. The shift highlighted the impact of work experiences on self-worth and led to significant advancements in organisational psychology and the development of the concept of "organization-based self-esteem". The review's call for situation-specific measurement directly contributed to the development of the OBSE construct and influenced future research agendas in employee self-concept.

Tharenou's empirical research in this early period covered a range of HRM topics, for example, on absenteeism, managerial training needs analysis, supervisory development programs, and developmental performance appraisal systems.

=== Training and development ===
A strand of Tharenou's research on managerial and career advancement concerns the impact of training, examining relationships between training participation, organisational effectiveness, and performance outcomes. In her highly cited meta-analytic review co-authored with Alan Saks and Celia Moore, Tharenou (2007) revealed training was found to be more strongly associated with human resource and organisational performance than with financial performance. The review emphasizes the importance of contextual factors such as business strategy and human capital alignment. A 2001 empirical study further found that training motivation was a significant predictor of participation in training and development affected by the context.

=== Career advancement and gender ===
A central focus of Tharenou's research concerns explaining gender differences in managerial career advancement, addressing the United Nations' sustainable development goal of gender equality in holding management and executive roles. Burgess and Tharenou (2002) published one of the most highly cited studies globally on women's low representation on corporate boards, establishing the baseline for why women are underrepresented in governance.

Tharenou's 1994 study (with Shane Latimer and Denise Conroy) analysed organisational and individual factors associated with advancement among women and men. For the first time structural equation modelling applied to gendered models provided actual statistical evidence for how women with the same qualifications as men did not advance at the same rate. Later work extended the examination of the roles of personal traits, informal social processes, human capital, and social capital on career progression. Tharenou's (2001) paper shifted the focus from women's failures to advance in management to how social and personal mechanisms differentially drive advancement for each gender. Metz and Tharenou (2001) were amongst the first to show the relative contribution of human and social capital to women managers's career advancement.

Other studies focused on the impact of particular factors on gender differences in advancement. Research on mentoring (Tharenou, 2005) found that career-related mentor support was more strongly associated with women's advancement than men's, while some forms of psychosocial support were linked to reduced advancement for women. Her work also examined links between family structure and managerial advancement. She synthesised major theoretical perspectives on career progression, including internal labour markets, mentoring and networks, and individual characteristics.

=== International careers and expatriation ===
From the 2000s onward, Tharenou examined international careers and global mobility, particularly self-initiated expatriate professionals who relocate abroad independently of organisational assignment. Her research compared these workers with company-assigned expatriates and examined their career outcomes.

Her study with Caulfield (2010) in the Academy of Management Journal analysed factors influencing whether self-initiated expatriates return to their home country, identifying career opportunities, organisational attachment, and personal considerations as key determinants of repatriation.

Her work also addressed gender in global mobility. A 2010 study in the Journal of Business Ethics examined ethical and career implications of women's self-initiated expatriation, finding that although participation rates may be similar to men's, career returns often differ.

In a 2020 conceptual review co-authored with Carol Kulik she extended her research on self-initiated expatriates to skilled migrants, developing a model of their organisational socialisation and reviewing evidence on workplace conditions and organisational responses. Subsequent systematic reviews examined the career advancement of skilled migrant and expatriate women and gender differences in their managerial career advancement.

== Awards and honours ==
- Elton Mayo Award (2001), from the Australian Psychological Society, recognising significant contributions to industrial and organisational psychology.
- Fellow, formerly Distinguished Scholar Award (1999), Australian and New Zealand Academy of Management.
- Outstanding Paper Award (1989), Management Education and Development Division of the US Academy of Management.
- Runner-up, Dorothy Harlow Award for best paper at Academy of Management Meetings (1988, 1993, 1996).
- A top 20 journal article on global careers published from 2002–2022, selected by Women in the Academy of International Business.
- Elected Fellow (2009) of the Society for Industrial and Organizational Psychology.
- Repeated inclusion annually since 2020 in Stanford University's World's Top 2% most-cited researchers in business and management.
- Ranked among leading scholars within the top 1% in the social sciences and humanities by Research.com based on citation-based metrics.
- Highly ranked scholar in the top 0.05% worldwide by Scholar GPS for lifetime productivity and impact over career, specifically in the specialties of Human Resource Management, International Business, and Gender and Women's Studies.

== Selected works ==
=== Books ===
- Tharenou, Phyllis; Donohue, Ross; Cooper, Brian (2007). Management Research Methods. New York: Cambridge University Press. ISBN 9780521694285.

=== Journal articles ===
- Tharenou, Phyllis (1979). "Employee self-esteem: A review of the literature". Journal of Vocational Behavior. 15 (1): 316–346. doi:10.1016/0001-8791(79)90028-9.
- Tharenou, Phyllis; Latimer, Shane; Conroy, Denise K. (1994). "How do you make it to the top? An examination of influences on women's and men's managerial advancement". Academy of Management Journal. 37 (4): 899–931. doi:10.5465/256604.
- Tharenou, Phyllis (1999). "Is there a link between family structures and women's and men's career advancement?". Journal of Organizational Behavior. 20 (6): 837–863. doi:10.1002/(SICI)1099-1379(199911)20:6<837::AID-JOB978>3.0.CO;2-W.
- Tharenou, Phyllis (2001). "Going up: Do traits and informal social processes predict advancing in management?". Academy of Management Journal. 44 (5): 1005–1017. doi:10.5465/3069444.
- Metz, Isabel; Tharenou, Phyllis (2001). "Women's career advancement: The relative contribution of human and social capital". Group and Organization Management. 26 (3): 312–342. doi:10.1177/1059601101026003005 (inactive 9 October 2026).
- Burgess, Zena; Tharenou, Phyllis (2002). "Women board directors: Characteristics of the few". Journal of Business Ethics. 37: 39–49. doi:10.1023/A:1014726001155.
- Tharenou, Phyllis; Saks, Alan; Moore, Celia (2007). "A review and critique of research on training and organizational-level outcomes". Human Resource Management Review. 17 (3): 251–273. doi:10.1016/j.hrmr.2007.07.003.
- Tharenou, Phyllis; Caulfield, Natasha (2010). "Will I stay or will I go? Explaining repatriation by self-initiated expatriates". Academy of Management Journal. 53 (5): 1009–1028. doi:10.5465/amj.2010.54533183.
- Tharenou, Phyllis (2010). "Women's self–initiated expatriation as a career option and its ethical issues". Journal of Business Ethics. 95: 73–88. doi:10.1007/s10551-010-0438-3 (inactive 9 October 2026).
- Tharenou, Phyllis; Seet, Pi-Shen (2014). "China's reverse brain drain: Regaining and retaining talent". International Studies of Management & Organization. 44 (2): 55–75. doi:10.2753/IMO0020-8825440203.
- Tharenou, Phyllis (2015). "Chinese international business graduates–a career dilemma: Repatriate or stay?". Journal of Management & Organization. 21 (1): 37–59. doi:10.1017/jmo.2014.68.
- Tharenou, Phyllis; Kulik, Carol (2020). "Skilled migrants employed in developed, mature economies: From newcomers to organizational insiders". Journal of Management. 46 (6): 1156–1181. doi:10.1177/0149206320921229.
- Tharenou, Phyllis (2024). "Dashed hopes or delayed met expectations? Skilled migrant women's qualification-matched employment". Journal of Global Mobility. 12 (3): 545–570. doi:10.1108/JGM-01-2024-0005 (inactive 9 October 2026).
- Tharenou, Phyllis (2026). "Skilled migrant and self-initiated expatriate women: Their managerial advancement in developed, mature economies". Journal of Global Mobility. 14: 73–107. doi:10.1108/JGM-04-2025-0043.

=== Book chapters ===
- Tharenou, Phyllis (1997). "Managerial career advancement". In Cooper, Cary; Robertson, Ivan T. (eds.). International Review of Industrial and Organizational Psychology. New York: Wiley. pp. 39–93.
