= Ray Chen (disambiguation) =

Ray Chen (born 1989) is a Taiwanese-Australian violinist.

Ray Chen or Raymond Chen may also refer to:

- Raymond T. Chen (born 1968), United States judge
- Ray Chen (engineer), American engineer
- Raymond Chen (Microsoft), Microsoft employee

== See also ==
- Ray Chan (disambiguation)
- Raymond Chang (disambiguation)
