= Horace Barber =

Australian botanist

Horace Newton Barber FAA FRS (26 May 1914 – 16 April 1971) was an Australian botanist and geneticist, Foundation Professor of Botany at the University of Tasmania (1947–1963) and Foundation Professor of Botany at the University of New South Wales (1964–1971).

== Personal life ==
Barber was born on 26 May 1914 in Warburton, Cheshire, to Horace Maximilian Barber and Mary, née Newton. He was educated at Cambridge (BA 1936; MA 1944; ScD 1963) and London University (PhD 1942). His education was interrupted by war service where he served as a Scientific Officer at the Telecommunications Research Establishment of the Ministry of Aircraft Production 1941–45, and Flight Lieutenant RAFVR (Hon) with service in Mediterranean and Southeast Asia Commands 1943–45.

Following the war he moved to Australia, taking a position as lecturer in botany at the University of Sydney from March 1946. He married Nancy Patricia O'Grady, also a lecturer at the University of Sydney, on 20 April 1946 at St Mary's Cathedral, Sydney.

He died of a rare cancer (sarcoma) on 16 April 1971 (aged 56) at his Epping (Sydney) home and was buried in the Field of Mars cemetery.

His son Michael AO FAA (born 1947) was an academic and subsequently Vice Chancellor of the Flinders University of South Australia from 2008 until 2014.

== Recognition ==
- 1958 Fellow of the Australian Academy of Science (FAA)
- 1963 Fellow of the Royal Society (FRS)
- 1972 Eucalyptus barberi was named in his honour

The standard author abbreviation H.N.Barber is used to indicate this person as the author when citing a botanical name.
