= Leo Williams (rugby union) =

Leo Gerard Williams AO RFD (14 May 1941 – 14 October 2009) was an Australian rugby union official, who played for the Queensland Reds (1961–1965), managed the team (1971–1972) and also served as president of Queensland Rugby Union (1988–1995), chairman of Australian Rugby Union (1994–1996) and as a board member of Rugby World Cup (1995–2000), eventually becoming chair (1997–2000). As chair he oversaw the RWC 7s tournament in Hong Kong in 1997 and the 1999 Rugby World Cup won by the Australian Wallabies.

Williams attended school at Nudgee College and was captain of the swimming team and a member of the First XV in his final year. He graduated in 1958 and commenced arts/law degrees at the University of Queensland in 1959. He earned three University blues in swimming, water polo and rugby having represented the State of Queensland in all three sports in the late 1950s and early 1960s. He graduated in 1964.

Williams played Brisbane club rugby for the University of Queensland Rugby Club winning three first grade premierships in 1962, 1964 and 1965. He also served as a trustee of the club and coached Under 18 and Under 19 teams in the late 1960s. Williams played his first game for the Queensland Reds against the New Zealand All Blacks in a mid-week game in 1961 as a 21-year-old. He toured with the Queensland team to New Zealand (1962) and Fiji (1965). He also played against the touring South African rugby Springboks in 1965. He retired from the game as a 25-year-old after the 1965 rugby season ended.

Williams was a commercial lawyer by trade who also had a successful business career before becoming involved with rugby administration. He establishing the legal firm Williams and Williams in 1966 with his father Leo (Senior) and provided advice to a number of entities across the mining, media and sporting industries throughout the 1960s, 1970s and the early 1980s. Williams retired from his full-time legal practice in 1983 to concentrate on his business activities. He remained aligned to the legal industry for the next two decades, acting as a consultant in the Brisbane office of Freehills until just before his death.

As a result of his legal work, Williams was appointed to a number of boards during the 1970s and 1980s, including becoming the chair of radio station Triple M Brisbane (4MMM) when it was established in 1980 after the State Government offered up a new FM radio licence for potential bidders. Leo and partners from Sydney's 2MMM radio station were leaders of the successful consortium. At the time FM radio was not the dominant frequency in operation across the industry, but using new technologies and marketing strategies quickly grew a dominant position in the local market. The station changed its name to FM104 and at one point during the 1980s garnered over 37% of Brisbane's listening audience. The business was sold to Hoyts Entertainment in 1987, at the time owned by Christopher Skase.

During the 1980s Leo was also chairman of the Brisbane Entertainment Centre, the Brisbane Bullets and served on the Channel 7 Board. Williams was chair of the Bullets when the team moved home games to the Entertainment Centre, drawing league leading crowd attendance and regularly competing in the NBL Grand Final, which the team won in 1985 and 1987.

Between 1985 and 1989 Leo was president of Tattersall's Club in Brisbane, and was a driving force behind the club's redevelopment in the early 1990s. The Williams Room at the club is named after him.

Williams also served in the Army Reserve Legal Corp for over 25 years from the late 1960s, earning the Reserve Force Decoration in the early 1990s.

Williams returned to rugby as president of the QRU in the late 1980s and served as president until 1995. During his period with the QRU the amateur predecessor competition of the current Super Rugby tournament was established. Originally known as the Super 6 it comprised teams from Australia, New Zealand and Fiji, before South African teams were added in 1993 to form the Super 10 tournament. Queensland won the Super 6 title in 1992. They also won the Super 10 title in 1994 and 1995. Williams joined the ARU Board in 1994 as chair, a position he retained until 1996. He joined the board of the Rugby World Cup in 1995, and attended the tournament in South Africa which was famously won by the South African Springboks.

Williams was chair of Australian Rugby Union during the formation of SANZAR, a governing body which united ARU with New Zealand Rugby Union and South African Rugby Union and which operates the Super Rugby and Tri Nations championships. Along with Louis Luyt (South Africa) and Richie Guy (New Zealand), he was one of the signatories to a broadcasting contract with News Limited which signified rugby union's transformation to a professional sport.

Williams also served on the PA Research Foundation for more than a decade and was a member of the Queensland Racing Appeals Tribunal in the 1990s and early 2000s. During the 1990s Williams was Honorary Consul for Samoa and South Africa in Queensland.

In January 2000 Williams was awarded an AO for services to Business, the Community and Rugby, thereby becoming an Officer of the Order of Australia (General Division).

Leo was married to Nancye from January 1966 until his death in October 2014 and had four children, Nicole Juliet (born 1966), Paul Leo (born 1968), Anthony David (born 1969) and Julienne Brigitta (born 1974).
