= Raymond Chang =

Ray or Raymond Chang may refer to:

- G. Raymond Chang (1948–2014), CEO of CI Financial, philanthropist, chancellor of Ryerson University
- Ray Chang (baseball) (born 1983), Chinese-American infielder
- Raymond Chang (chemist) (1939–2017), emeritus professor at Williams College
- Ray Chang (actor) (born 1985), Taiwanese actor

== See also ==
- Ray Chan (disambiguation)
- Ray Chen (disambiguation)
