= Ray Chan (academic) =

American oncology nurse and academic

Raymond Javan Chan
- Occupations: Senior university executive, oncology nurse, clinical trialist, academic researcher
- Awards: Premier’s Award for Excellence in Leadership, Queensland Government; International Nurse Researcher Fall of Fame, The Sigma Theta Tau International Honor Society of Nursing

Academic background
- Education: Bachelor of Nursing; Master of Applied Science by Research; Doctor of Philosophy
- Alma mater: Queensland University of Technology

Academic work
- Institutions: Flinders University

Raymond Javan Chan is an Australian oncology nurse, clinical trialist, researcher, and senior administrator. He is the Matthew Flinders Professor of Cancer Nursing, and director of the Caring Futures Institute and dean of research within the College of Nursing and Health Sciences, Flinders University. He also holds academic titles as NHMRC Investigator Fellow and Matthew Flinders Fellow. He also currently holds an NHMRC Investigator Fellowship.

Chan has published over 220 peer reviewed articles. His research program focuses on the policy, health services' and health professionals' responses to the needs of people affected by cancer in the post-treatment survivorship phase. His research interests include improving best, equitable outcomes through patient navigation, preventing and alleviating distressing cancer- or treatment-related toxicities, enhancing integrated care models involving primary care providers, and improving outcomes for people receiving palliative/end-of-life care.

Chan is a Fellow of Australian College of Nursing, and Fellow of American Academy of Nursing In 2021, he was inducted to the Sigma Theta Tau International Nurse Researcher Hall of Fame.

Chan served as Flinders University's acting vice-chancellor over several periods during 2024 and 2025.

== Education ==
Chan studied in the School of Nursing at Queensland University of Technology and received his Bachelor of Nursing degree in 2004, a Master of Applied Science by Research in 2008, and a Doctor of Philosophy degree in 2014.

== Career ==
Chan started his career as a personal care assistant at Greenslopes Hospital in 2002, and later joined Mater Adult Hospital as a registered nurse in 2004. He then held an appointment as a clinical nurse (palliative care) at Princess Alexandra Hospital between 2005 and 2008. Following this appointment, he joined Metro North Hospital and Health Service and held the roles of cancer nurse researcher, deputy director of cancer research, and professor of nursing between 2008 and 2017. Chan was appointed as professor of cancer nursing in 2018 at Princess Alexandra Hospital, Metro South Hospital and Health Service and Queensland University of Technology. In August, 2021, Chan commenced as inaugural director for the Caring Futures Institute at Flinders University, South Australia. In 2024, Chan commenced as the deputy vice chancellor research at Flinders University.

Chan is a past president of the Cancer Nurses Society of Australia (CNSA), and serves as a director on the board of the International Society of Nurses in Cancer Care (ISNCC). In 2021, Chan was appointed by the Australian Federal Minister of Health to the Research Committee National Health and Medical Research Council.

== Research ==
Chan has worked to advance the management of distressing cancer- or treatment-related toxicities, and enhance integrated care models for cancer survivors.

=== Cancer survivorship and navigation models of care ===
Chan is an active clinical trialist who has developed, tested and implemented innovative shared-care models for breast cancer, prostate cancer, lymphoma, and survivors. Chan is an active clinical trialist who has developed, tested and implemented innovative shared-care models for breast cancer, prostate cancer, lymphoma and neuroendocrine cancer survivors. As a nurse, he advocates for a nurse-enabled, multidisciplinary approach involving cancer specialists (medical specialists and specialist cancer nurses) and primary care providers (general practitioners and practice nurses).

In 2023, Chan led a team of researchers to complete an evidence report on cancer patient navigation. This work was published in the CA: A Cancer Journal for Clinicians.

=== Symptom and toxicity management ===
==== Skin toxicity ====
Chan’s clinical trials and meta-analyses in radiation dermatitis have been adopted into clinical guidelines from Multinational Association for Supportive Care in Cancer (MASCC); Oncology Nursing Society; UpToDate; and the EVIQ guidelines.

In 2019, Chan’s StrataXRT Trial provided a breakthrough as the world’s first positive trial for a non-steroidal intervention effective for reducing the risk of developing wet desquamation by 49% in patients receiving radiotherapy for head & neck cancer.

==== Financial toxicity ====
Chan is an active researcher in the field of financial toxicity (i.e. distress, burden, hardship). His work highlights the significance and prevalence of financial toxicity in cancer survivors. In 2017, he obtained an Oncology Nursing Foundation Fellowship to conduct a series of work on the relationships between financial toxicity or employment interference and symptom burden in cancer survivors. Chan’s work reported significant relationships between financial toxicity and physical/psychological symptom burden in cancer survivors, providing directions for further interventional work to improve patient outcomes.

==== Fatigue ====
Chan’s doctoral work examined self-management of fatigue in cancer survivors living with metastatic disease. Over recent years, the focus of his work has shifted to facilitate translation of available research evidence into practice. In 2020, he was awarded by the PA Research Foundation to develop a model of care, in collaboration with Cancer Council Queensland, for addressing cancer-related fatigue in all cancer survivors.

== Awards and honors ==
- 2014 - Outstanding Young Alumnus of the Year, Queensland University of Technology
- 2014 - Premier’s Award for Excellence in Leadership, Queensland Government
- 2021 - Inductee, Sigma Theta Tau International Nurse Researcher Hall of Fame
- 2021 - Nurse of the Year (Finalist), HESTA Australian Nursing Awards
- 2022 – Fellow, American Academy of Nursing
- 2023 – Outstanding Publication of the Year, Multinational Association for Supportive Care in Cancer

== Bibliography ==
- Chan R, Webster J. End-of-life care pathways for improving outcomes in caring for the dying (Review). Cochrane Database of Systematic Reviews. 2010, Issue 1. Art. No.: CD008006. DOI:10.1002/1451858.CD008006
- Chan R, Mann J, Keller J, Cheuk R, Tripcony L, Blades R, Keogh S (2014) Aqueous cream versus a natural oil-based emulsion containing allantoin for managing radiation-induced skin reactions in patients with cancer: A double-blind randomised controlled trial. International Journal of Radiation Oncology Biology Physics. 90 (4): 756-764.
- Molassiotis A, Yates P, Li Q, So WKW, Pongthavornkamol K, Pittayapan P, Komatsu H, Thandar M, Yi MS, Titus Chacko S, Lopez V, Butcon J, Wyld W, Chan R (2017). Mapping unmet supportive care needs in cancer survivors across the Asia-Pacific region: Results from the international STEP study. Annals of Oncology. 28: 2552-2558.
- Chan R, Blades R, Jones L, Downer T, Peet S, Button E, Wyld D, McPhail S, Doolan M, Yates P (2019). A single-blind, randomized controlled trial of StrataXRT® - a silicone-based film-forming gel dressing for prophylaxis and management of radiation dermatitis in patient with head and neck cancer. Radiotherapy and Oncology. 139: 72-78.
- Rickard C, Marsh N, Larsen E, McGrail M, Graces N, Runnegar N, Webster J, Corley A, McMillan D, Gowardman J, Long D, Fraser J, Gill F, Young J, Murgo M, Alexandrou E, Coudhury MA, Chan R, Gavin N, Daud A, Palermo A, Regli A, Playford G (2021) Replacement intervals for infusion sets to prevent central and arterial vascular catheter -related bloodstream infections: a randomised controlled trial (RSVP Trial). The Lancet. 397 (10283): 1447-1458.
- Chan R, Milch V, Crawford-Williams F, Oluwaseyifunmi AA, Joseph R, Johal J, Dick Y, Wallen M, Agarwal A, Nekhlyudov L, Tieu M, Al-Momani M, Turnbull S, Sathiarak R, Ratcliffe J, Keefe D, Hart N (2023). Patient Navigation in Cancer Care: An Overview of Systematic Review. CA: a Cancer Journal for Clinicians. 10.3322/caac.21788
