= Empire Times =

Student Newspaper

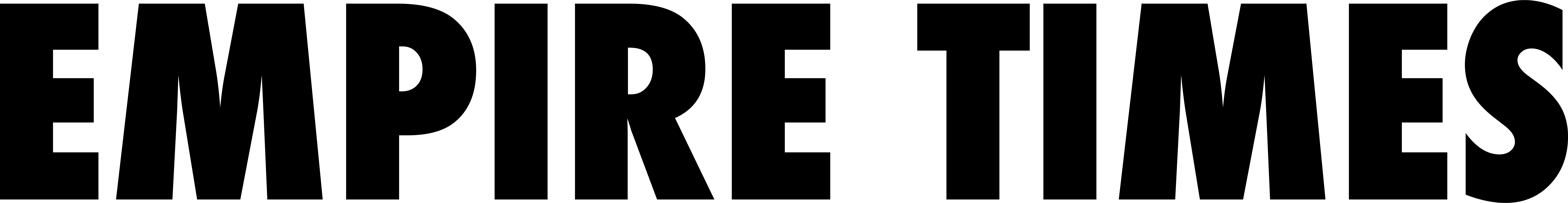
- Empire Times' Masthead (2024)
- Editors: Lachlan White, Noah Montgomery, Angel Parker & Miriam van der Heiden
- Categories: Arts Politics Youth
- Frequency: Four times a year
- Unpaid circulation: 8
- First issue: 11 March 1969 (57 years ago)
- Company: Flinders University Student Association
- Country: Australia
- Language: English
- Website: www.empiretimesmagazine.com

Empire Times (ET) is the student magazine of Flinders University, in Adelaide, South Australia. It ceased publication in 2006 as a result of voluntary student unionism, but resumed in 2013 with the reintroduction of SSAF. It is published by the Flinders University Student Association (FUSA).

== History ==
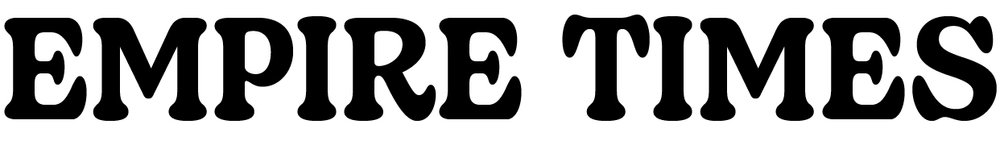
Empire Times' Masthead in 2023

Empire Times was founded as the student newspaper of Flinders University in 1969 by Martin Fabinyi (initially priced at 15 cents) and continued in publication until 2006, published by the Flinders University Student Association. It ceased publication in 2006 as a result of voluntary student unionism.

In 2004, edition 36 special woman's edition, called "Fempire Times", was accidentally printed as edition 37. This resulted in the 2005 edition being listed as 38.

Between 2007 and 2012, a student publication called The Libertine filled the void left from ceased production of Empire Times.

Publication of Empire Times resumed in 2013 with the reintroduction of SSAF.

== Today ==
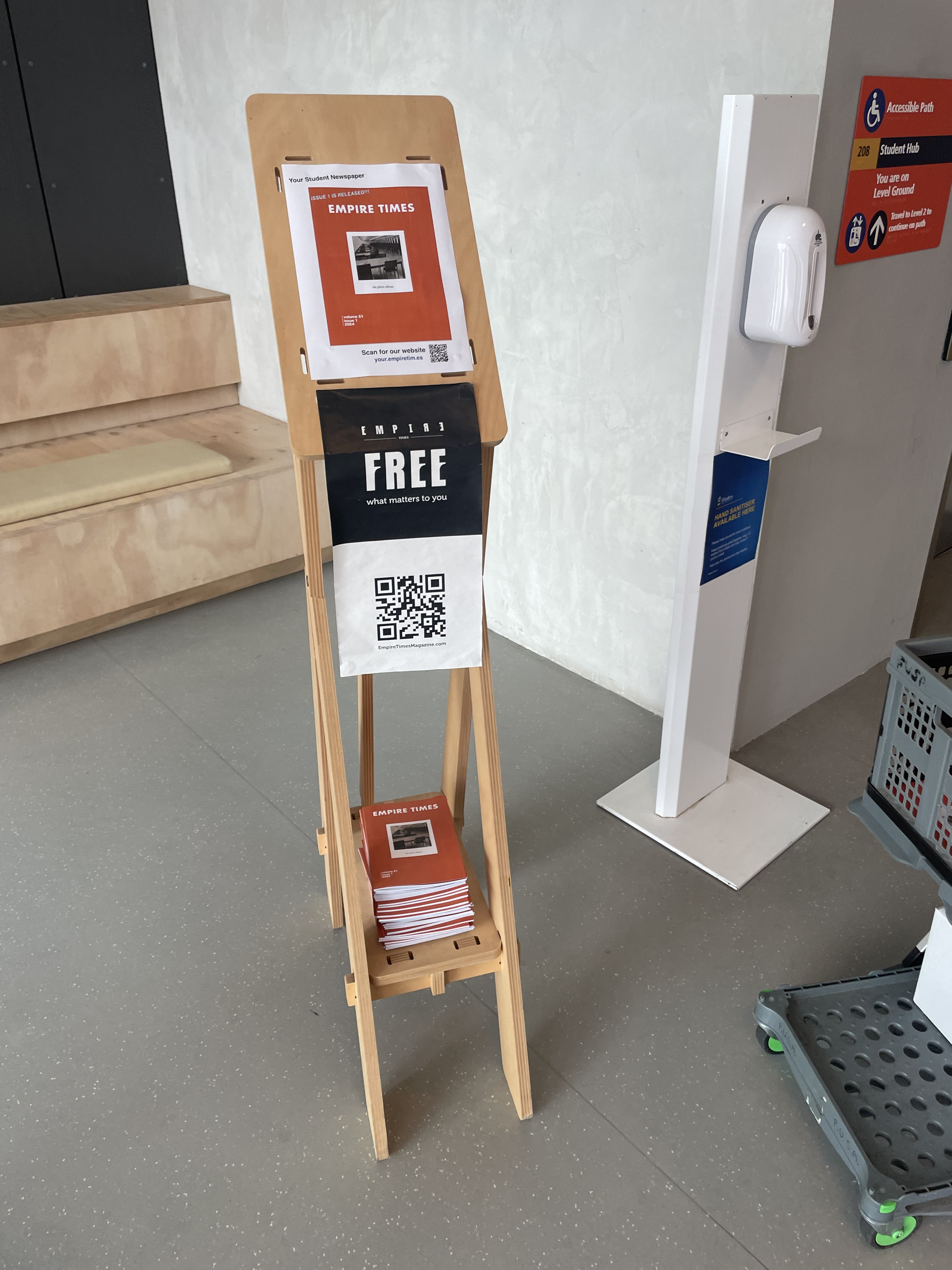
Empire Times newsstand in the Hub, Bedford Park campus

Empire Times, also abbreviated to ET, is published by FUSA and distributed free of charge at locations around campus. It also published online via Issuu. It is published four times a year.

== Editors ==
=== Editorial staff ===
In a typical year there are two to four paid editors, who manage the paper; editors are elected during FUSA student elections or appointed by student council. The term of office for an editor begins after 1 November until 30 November the following year, so there are two teams of editors during November.

As of 2023, the salary of the editing team is $30,000p.a. in total, which is usually divided equally between the team.

In the 2023 FUSA student elections, the 2024 Empire Times editorial team ran with the FIRE-UP ticket. As well, in the 2024 FUSA student elections, the 2025 Empire Times editorial team ran with the FIRE-UP ticket.

As of 2026, the magazine is edited by Evangelia, Amelia, and Kailani, with Evangelia as Editor-in Chief.

=== Prominent past editors and contributors ===
Notable former editors and contributors included Martin Armiger, Greig (HG Nelson) Pickhaver, Steph Key and Kate Ellis.

== Format ==
Prior to Voluntary Student Unionism, the paper was printed in a tabloid format on standard newsprint.

Most issues of Empire Times conform to a certain theme, reflected in the graphical style, and usually in the content itself. There are special theme issues such as Corona Times, focusing on COVID-19, or Fempire Times, which is written primarily or exclusively by women.

=== Collaborations ===
Empire Times has done collaborative issues with other student newspapers.

In 1973, Dit ego times was a joint publication between University of Adelaide's student newspaper On Dit, South Australian Institute of Technology’s student newspaper Egois, and Empire Times.

In 2022, On Dit collaborated with Empire Times to produce OnDit x Empire Times, both producing issues to circle around their content censorship for each other's restrictions respectively.
