= Tracy Dawes-Gromadzki =

Australian ecologist

Tracy Dawes-Gromadzki (born 1972) is an Australian ecologist most well known for her expertise and work with termites. She attended the Flinders University of South Australia where she finished her PhD. A fellowship was awarded to her after she completed her Doctorate with Tropical Ecosystem Research Centre from the CSIRO Division of Sustainable Ecosystems where she does research on termites. She created a system to sample termites.

== Early life and education ==
Dawes-Gromadzki was born in 1972 in Adelaide, South Australia. She is the eldest of the two girls. Her mother was a school teacher while her father was a construction worker.

Dawes-Gromadzki was involved in sports in her high school and received the Year 12 geography prize. Her mentor while obtain her PhD was Professor Mike Bull.

== Personal life ==
Dawes-Gromadzki married Adam who she met in the Flinders University of South Australia in 1990. After marriage, they moved to Darwin, Australia.

== Work ==
Looking at how animals and plants respond in the environment is her interest and considers herself an ecologist above anything. Specifically her job title is soil ecologist. Part of being an ecologist for Dawes-Gromadzki includes carrying out research and analyzed the importance of termites in the tropical savannas and in the southern parts of Australia. However, she has completed research on other vertebrates. Compared to other animals in the bottom of the food chain, termites do not die off in the winter and contribute to the food chain year round in Australia. She claims there are more than 350 species of termites in Australia.

Her work revolves around researching the importance of termites and other creatures in keeping the soil healthy by reusing nutrients. Thus, her goal in research is learning how to replenish soil in Australia and make Australia viable. Dawes-Gromadzki's work includes increasing research on creatures that affect the soil including the following: termites, ants, earthworms. She was author to the book Termites of Northern Australia along with scientists Peter Mainwaring Jacklyn, Alan Neil Andersen, and Ian Morris in 2005.

The techniques for catching each organism is carried out differently by Dawes-Gromadzki. Ants are caught with jars that contain substance that attracts them and it's buried in the soil without a lid on it. Then the termites are placed in a location with minimal soil health but the termites but be kept there by providing their food and living resources.

Dawes-Gromadzki is able to carry out this work through funding CSIRO and the Tropical Savannas Cooperative Research Centre of Australia, which she work with. In 2001 she became the Research Scientist for CSIRO.
