= Jack Barbalet =

Australian sociologist

Academic background
- Education: Flinders University; University of Adelaide

Academic work
- Institutions: Australian Catholic University; Hong Kong Baptist University; University of Papua New Guinea; University of Adelaide; Australian National University; University of Leicester; University of Western Sydney
- Main interests: Sociological theory, economic sociology, sinology
- Notable ideas: Sociology of emotions

Jack Barbalet is an Australian sociologist. Since 2017 he has been professor of sociology at the Australian Catholic University. He was previously Chair Professor and Head of the Department of Sociology at Hong Kong Baptist University. He has held appointments at the University of Papua New Guinea, the University of Adelaide, and the Australian National University. He was professor of sociology at the University of Leicester, where he was head of department, and subsequently professorial fellow in the Centre for Citizenship and Public Policy at the University of Western Sydney.

== Education ==
Barbalet completed undergraduate studies at the Flinders University of South Australia and was awarded a first class honours degree by Adelaide University, where he completed a PhD.

== Research ==
Barbalet’s research interests include sociological theory, economic sociology and China studies. He was an early contributor to citizenship studies. Barbalet was a leader in the development of the sociology of emotions, not only intellectually but also organizationally through the establishment of the Sociology of Emotions Research Network of the European Sociological Association.

Barbalet’s research includes the critical evaluation of Max Weber's sociology; his recent contributions have been to the sociological study of contemporary China.

== Selected publications ==
- Jack Barbalet. The Theory of Guanxi and Chinese Society. Oxford: Oxford University Press, 2021.
- Jack Barbalet. Confucianism and the Chinese Self: Re-examining Weber's China . London: Palgrave Macmillan, 2017.
- Jack Barbalet, Adam Possamai and Bryan Turner (editors). Religion and the State: A Comparative Sociology. London: Anthem Press, 2011.
- Jack Barbalet. Weber, Passion and Profits: ‘The Protestant Ethic and the Spirit of Capitalism’ in Context. Cambridge: Cambridge University Press, 2008/2011.
- Jack Barbalet (editor). Emotions and Sociology. Oxford: Blackwell Publishing (Sociological Review Monograph Series), 2002.
- Jack Barbalet. Emotion, Social Theory, and Social Structure: A Macrosociological Approach. Cambridge: Cambridge University Press, 2001.
- Jack Barbalet. Citizenship: Rights, Struggle and Class Inequality. London: Open University Press, 1988.
- Jack Barbalet. Marx's Construction of Social Theory. London: Routledge, 2015.
