= Colin Stirling =

Scottish biological scientist and academic

- Stirling in 2026

8th Vice-Chancellor of Flinders University
- Incumbent
- Assumed office 1 January 2015
- Chancellor: Stephen Gerlach (2015–2023); John Hood (2023–present)
- Preceded by: Michael Barber

Vice-Chancellor of Curtin University
- Acting
- In office 9 August 2013 – 16 February 2014
- Chancellor: Colin Beckett
- Preceded by: Jeanette Hacket
- Succeeded by: Deborah Terry

Personal details
- Born: Colin John Stirling Scotland
- Spouse: Mailys Stirling
- Children: 2
- Education: University of Edinburgh (BSc); University of Glasgow (PhD)
- Occupation: Geneticist; university administrator

Academic background
- Thesis: Cloning and Characterisation of E. coli xer Genes (1987)
- Doctoral advisor: David Sherratt

Academic work
- Discipline: Genetics
- Sub-discipline: Molecular genetics
- Institutions: Flinders University; Curtin University; University of Manchester
- Website: Official profile

Colin J. Stirling is a university executive and academic. He lives in Adelaide, South Australia, where he has held the position of vice-chancellor of Flinders University since 2015.

His academic background is in biology.

== Life and career ==
Born and educated in Scotland, Stirling was the first in his family to attend university, attaining a Bachelor of Science in microbiology, with first class honours, from the University of Edinburgh and completing a PhD in genetics at the University of Glasgow.

He held a NATO Research Fellowship at the University of California, Berkeley, in the lab of Nobel laureate Randy Schekman before being appointed to a lectureship at the University of Manchester in 1990. From 1998 to 2011 he was professor of genetics at the University of Manchester and served in various leadership positions, including education dean in the Faculty of Life Sciences, associate vice-president eLearning and vice-president for teaching and learning (2008–2011).

=== Vice-chancellorships ===
Stirling moved to Australia and became deputy vice-chancellor academic at Curtin University in 2011. He was later appointed provost and senior deputy vice-chancellor, before accepting the position of vice-chancellor of Flinders University in South Australia commencing in January 2015. His annual salary at Flinders University is ~$1,225,000.

He has extensive experience in university and corporate governance both in the UK and Australia and has served on a wide range of government committees, advisory boards and funding bodies. He is a lifetime member of the Lister Institute of Preventive Medicine.

On Australia Day 2016, Stirling became an Australian citizen.

== Honours and awards ==
- Royal Society Wolfson Research Fellowship (2006–2011)
- University of Manchester Distinguished Achievement Medal, "Researcher of the Year" (2005)
- Balfour Prize from the Genetical Society (1998)
- Fleming Award from the Society for General Microbiology (1997)
- The Lister Jenner Research Fellowship from the Lister Institute of Preventative Medicine (1993–1998)
- NATO Research Fellowship (1988–1990)

== Leadership ==
One of Stirling's earliest priorities upon commencing at Flinders University was crafting a 10-year strategic plan, Making a Difference - The 2025 Agenda, which outlined an ambitious plan to restructure the university and elevate its education and research.

In 2017 the university's previous model of four faculties and fourteen schools was transformed into six colleges: the College of Business Government and Law, the College of Education, Psychology and Social Work, the College of Humanities, Arts and Social Sciences, the College of Medicine and Public Health, the College of Nursing and Health Sciences and the College of Science and Engineering. Professional services were reorganised to align with the new model.

In 2018, Flinders University embarked upon an academic restructure process which sought to increase staff levels and appoint teaching specialists. Opposed by the local branch of the National Tertiary Education Union, several notices of dispute were lodged which the university referred to the Fair Work Commission. On 6 December 2018 recommendations handed down by commissioner Christopher Platt referred to the genuineness of the university's change proposals and stated that the organisational change process should continue with some urgency with the aim of all employees being advised of processes and outcomes as soon as possible. The restructure was completed in early 2019.

In 2019, Stirling announced AUD$200m of strategic investments over five years with a AUD$100m investment in research and a matching AUD$100m investment in teaching and learning.

Stirling's vision has included substantial uplift in facilities to attract both students and high calibre staff. Subsequent to the construction of a new student hub and central plaza area, the university announced plans for Flinders Village, an education, research and lifestyle precinct adjacent to its Bedford Park and Sturt campuses near the Flinders Medical Centre and Flinders Private Hospital.

The announced extension of the Clovelly Park rail line to create the Flinders railway station at the Flinders precinct was the catalyst for Stirling to launch stage one of Flinders Village, the construction of a Health and Medical Research Building.

At the Tonsley Innovation Precinct, a collaboration with BAE Systems Australia established the Factory of the Future at Line Zero, on the site of the former Mitsubishi Motors Australia car assembly line. Plans are in train to build on the Factory of the Future's success with an Advanced Manufacturing Accelerator facility.

In 2021, Stirling announced Flinders University would extend its city presence with a new vertical campus as the anchor tenant in Walker Corporation's Festival Tower development behind Old Parliament House on North Terrace.

To underpin the university's strategic growth, Stirling has sought to develop a positive campus culture resulting in a values and ethos statement and staff code of conduct.

During Stirling's tenure, Flinders University has adopted an inaugural INNOVATE Reconciliation Action Plan, engaged in the Universities Australia Respect. Now. Always. campaign for campus safety, and achieved Athena SWAN bronze accreditation for gender equity.

== Controversies ==
In a senate hearing on the Quality of governance at Australian higher education providers, Stirling stated that:

"I can also say in response to some press stories that have been published that there are a significant number of projects that the university is engaged in that are specifically involved in research into the current and ongoing algal bloom phenomenon, which is of huge importance here in South Australia. There is no position being disestablished at Flinders that is involved in any of those projects."

The restructure at Flinders University included the axing of physical oceanographer associate professor Jochen Kaempf whose research is potentially useful in the prediction of the toxic algal bloom.
