= Flinders University Student Association =

Student union at Flinders University in Australia

- Abbreviation: FUSA
- Predecessor: Student Association of Flinders University (SAFU)
- Formation: 1 January 2013
- Type: Student union
- Location: Flinders University
- President: Liam Southern
- Main organ: Student Council
- Subsidiaries: Empire Times (Student Publication)
- Affiliations: National Union of Students (Australia)
- Website: www.fusa.edu.au

The Flinders University Student Association (FUSA) is a student union at Flinders University, South Australia. It provides free welfare services, academic advocacy, grants for clubs and societies, and funding for the student newspaper, Empire Times. It also organises an O'Week each semester, as well as various social events throughout the year.

FUSA does not have a structurally separate student representative body, and is overseen directly be an elected Student Council whose members are responsible for providing political representation to students and governance of the association.

== History ==
Between 1966 and 2006, the Student Association of Flinders University (SAFU) provided student representation on campus. When the Howard government introduced voluntary student unionism in 2005 the organisation lost the vast majority of its funding and soon collapsed.

FlindersONE, a commercial company owned by the university, took over most of the services formerly provided by SAFU and a Student Representative Council (SRC) was created as a subcommittee of the FlindersONE board.

After the Gillard government introduced the Student Services & Amenities Fee (SSAF) in 2011 representatives of the SRC began negotiations with university to create an independent student organisation. A funding agreement was reached with the university, and on 23 April 2012 the SRC voted to endorse the constitution of the Flinders University Student Association. Student representatives completed their terms and the first FUSA Student Council began on 1 January 2013.

== Student Council ==
Notable former members of student council included Kate Ellis, and Amanda Rishworth.

=== 2024 Student Council ===
In 2023, student elections, FIRE-UP had a landslide victory with Activate and Left Action only gaining one General Council member each. In 2024 student elections, FIRE-UP held their majority on student council, with General Council member and First Nation Students Officer as Independents and Fair Dinkums gaining Environment Officer after the withdrawal of the FIRE-UP candidate.

=== 2027 Student Council ===
In the 2026 student elections, FIRE-UP won a narrow victory, winning all office bearer positions they contested except for Social Activities Officer and Women's Officer, both of which were won by Activate. FIRE-UP and Activate both won two General Council members, while Left Action and Grassroots gained one General Council member each.

FUSA Student Council
- 15th Student Council

History
- Founded: October 1, 2012
- Preceded by: 14th Student Council (2026)

Leadership
- Student President: Liam Southern, FIRE-UP since 13-16 October 2026 (1 months ago)

Structure
- Seats: 20
- Political groups: Composition: FIRE-UP (11); Activate (4); Left Action (1); Grassroots (1); Independent (2)

Elections
- First election: 2012
- Last election: October, 2026
- Next election: October, 2027

Meeting place
- Alere Cafe, Bedford Park Campus
- University Council Room, Registry building, Bedford Park Campus

Website
- FUSA Student Council

Rules
- FUSA Constitution & Regulations

== Campaigns and activism ==
FUSA has called for better public transport to the university from the Government of South Australia, citing the high number of students driving to campus and the low number of car parks provided by the university.

In 2015, FUSA and the National Tertiary Education Union organised an extended campaign against the Abbott government's plans to create a $4 million policy centre at the university run by climate denier Bjørn Lomborg. The organisers claimed that the proposal was done with no consultation with staff and students, and threatened the academic reputation of the university. In October 2015, plans for the centre were dropped by the Turnbull government.
