= Re-Timer Pty Ltd =

Re-Time Pty Ltd
- Type: Private Company
- Industry: Healthcare
- Founded: 2011; 15 years ago
- Founders: Professor Leon Lack, Dr Helen Wright, Ben Olsen
- Headquarters: 18, Sherriffs Road, Lonsdale SA 5160 Australia, Australia
- Area served: Worldwide
- Key people: Nitin Goyal: COO, Director; Bharat Garg: Director; Sinead O'Connell: Director; Puneet Saim: Director:
- Website: retimer.com.au

Re-Time Pty Ltd is a university-owned company headquartered in Australia which commercialize novel sleep devices from the research sector.

The company was founded in 2005 by Flinders University after the publication of a 2001 Flinders study showing green-blue light therapy was effective in the treatment of Circadian rhythm sleep disorders and Seasonal Affective Disorder.

The Chief Investigator was Professor Leon Lack. Originally from Stanford University, California, Lack moved to Flinders University in 1972. Lack went on to publish three more peer-reviewed research articles in 2003, 2004 and 2007 covering light therapy to treat sleep disorders including Delayed sleep phase disorder and Jet lag syndrome. These studies would further demonstrate the efficacy of green-blue light therapy for in improving sleep.

Flinders filed patents in the United States, Japan, Korean, China and Europe to cover the specification of the light therapy prototype used in the 2001 study.

In 2011 Flinders University signed a joint venture agreement with SMR Australia, a subsidiary of Samvardhana Motherson Group based in Noida, India with turnover USD $6.9billion. SMR Australia became a shareholder in Re-Timer Pty Ltd and also obtained the rights to design and manufacture the device.

The retimer product was launched in November 2012 and received significant global media coverage, which included the Wall Street Journal, CNN, BBC and Fox News.

In the company's home state of South Australia, considerable attention has focused on the model of technology transfer used to commercialize this University research.

In an interview with Forbes Magazine, Re-Timer Managing Director stated 85% of production is now exported from South Australia to over 40 different countries.

In October 2016 the company successfully completed crowdfunding for a novel wearable technology called Thim.
