= Michael Barber (academic) =

Australian mathematician, physicist and academic

Michael Barber AO FAA FAICD FTSE
- Born: 30 April 1947
- Education: Cornell University, University of New South Wales
- Occupations: Mathematician; physicist
- Awards: Centenary Medal; SIAM Fellow
- Scientific career
- Fields: Statistical mechanics, materials science, computational mathematics
- Workplaces: Australian National University; University of New South Wales; Flinders University; University of Western Australia
- Doctoral advisor: Michael Fisher
- Doctoral students: Murray Batchelor, Peter George Hornby

Michael Newton Barber (born 30 April 1947) is a mathematician, physicist and academic. He was Vice-Chancellor of Flinders University in South Australia from 2008 until 2014.

== Career ==
Barber studied at the University of New South Wales, where he received the University Medal in applied mathematics and graduated with first class honours. He received a PhD from Cornell University in the USA in theoretical physics in 1972. He is best known for the scaling theory of finite size effects at phase transitions, which he introduced together with Michael Fisher.

Barber worked at the Australian National University and University of New South Wales as an academic in the 1970s and 1980s. in 1990, he was appointed Dean of the Faculty of Science at the ANU.

He assumed his first office-bearing position as pro vice-chancellor (research) at the University of Western Australia in 1994 and held the position until 2002. That year, Barber was appointed executive director of science planning at the CSIRO. In 2006, he was appointed group executive of information, manufacturing and minerals. He held this position until his appointment as vice-chancellor at Flinders University in 2008—a position he held until December 2014. During his time as vice-chancellor he worked "to enhance the University’s contribution to the ‘new South Australia’ with its strong defence and resources sectors." In 2008 he stated: "The University is already more engaged with the defence and resource industries than many people recognise but we need to further strengthen the science and technology base at Flinders so that the University is better positioned to grasp more of the opportunities in the new South Australia. We need to work through this in a planned and deliberate way to find appropriate strategies to address it."

In 2012, Barber was a member of the South Australian State Advisory Council of the Committee for Economic Development of Australia (CEDA).

That same year, Barber's salary for his position as vice-chancellor of Flinders University became a controversial topic. The Advertiser revealed that he would receive between $710,000 and $719,999 in 2012. In 2010 his salary had been $545,000. A spokesperson from Flinders University stated that his remuneration was "in line" with industry standards.

Throughout his career, Barber has acted as an advisor on science and research matters to government and industry in Australia and overseas.

== Recognition ==
Barber was elected a Fellow of the Australian Academy of Science in 1992. He served as the organisation's Secretary, Science Policy from 2001 until 2005. In 2001 he was awarded the Centenary Medal "for service to Australian society through university administration and scientific research". In 2009 he was elected a Fellow of the Society for Industrial and Applied Mathematics (SIAM).

In 2018 Barber was appointed an Officer of the Order of Australia (AO) for "distinguished service to higher education administration, and in the field of mathematical physics, particularly statistical mechanics, as an academic and researcher, and through contributions to science policy reform".

== Personal life ==
Barber's father was noted Australian botanist and geneticist Horace Barber FAA FRS.
