= Eric Neal =

Governor of South Australia from 1996 to 2001 (1924–2025)

The Honourable Sir Eric Neal AC CVO KStJ FTSE FAICD(Life)
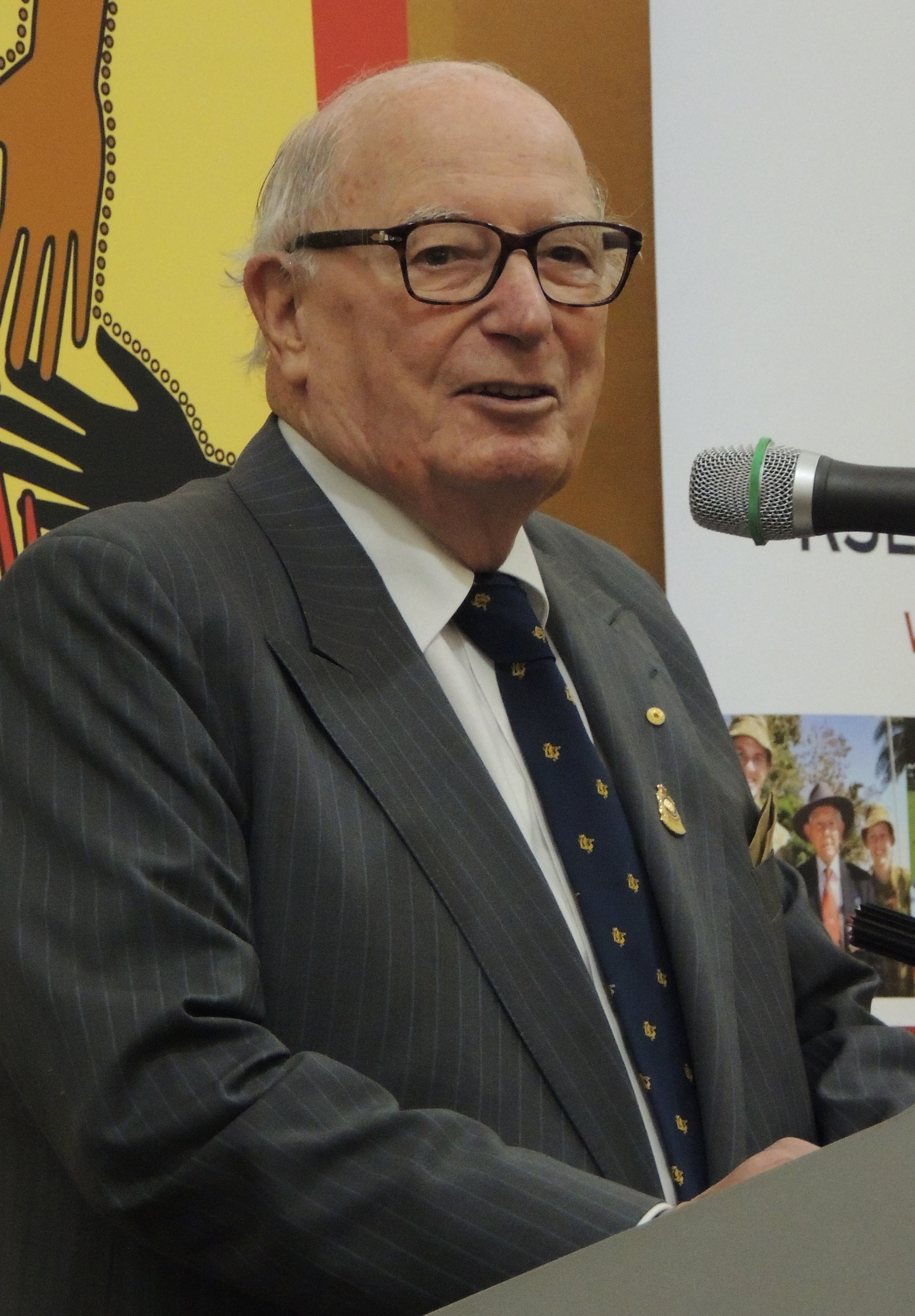
- Neal in 2016

5th Chancellor of Flinders University
- In office 2002–2010
- Preceded by: Deirdre Jordan
- Succeeded by: Stephen Gerlach

32nd Governor of South Australia
- In office 22 July 1996 – 3 November 2001
- Monarch: Elizabeth II
- Premier: Dean Brown (1996); John Olsen (1996–2001)
- Preceded by: Dame Roma Mitchell
- Succeeded by: Marjorie Jackson-Nelson

Chief Commissioner of Sydney
- In office 26 March 1987 – 31 December 1988
- Preceded by: Doug Sutherland as Lord Mayor
- Succeeded by: Jeremy Bingham as Lord Mayor

Councillor of the Sydney County Council for the 1st Constituency
- In office 25 November 1987 – 2 January 1990
- Preceded by: Jack Calpis
- Succeeded by: Council abolished

Personal details
- Born: Eric James Neal; 3 June 1924 London, England, UK
- Died: 2 September 2025 (aged 101) North Adelaide, South Australia
- Resting place: Cheltenham Cemetery (South Australia)
- Spouse(s): Joan Bowden, Lady Neal (m. 1950; died 2023)
- Children: Three (predeceased by one)
- Relatives: David "Kochie" Koch (nephew)
- Occupation: Academic administrator, banker, manufacturing executive, civic and public office-holder

The Hon. Sir Eric James Neal AC CVO KStJ (3 June 1924 – 2 September 2025) was an Australian academic administrator, banker, manufacturing executive, and senior public official. He was the Chief Commissioner of Sydney (1987–1988), Governor of South Australia (1996–2001), and Chancellor of Flinders University (2002–2010).

== Life and career ==
Neal was trained as an engineer at the South Australian School of Mines (now part of the University of South Australia), and became a successful businessman. The peak of his career was fourteen years as CEO of Boral. He was also a Director of John Fairfax Holdings, BHP, Coca-Cola Amatil and AMP and Chairperson of Westpac and Atlas Copco Australia.

In 1984, Neal was listed as one of Australia's 125 best remunerated business executives by Australian Business magazine. In 1992, journalist Andrew Cornell described him as a "tough, frequently autocratic businessman."

Neal chaired various government advisory bodies and served as National Chairman, Duke of Edinburgh's Award (1984–92), President of the Order of Australia Association (1989–92), Chair of the Opera Foundation (1990–96). He was Chief Commissioner (and ex officio Lord Mayor) of the City of Sydney (1987–88), and a member of the Senate of the University of Sydney.

Neal was appointed Governor of South Australia in 1996, and became the first person from the business community to take up residence in Government House, Adelaide. He held the position until 2001, after which he served as Chancellor of Flinders University from 2002 until 2010.

=== Defence sector ===
Neal was an Honorary Air Commodore of the City of Adelaide Squadron of the Royal Australian Air Force and Honorary Colonel of the Royal South Australia Regiment. He was also an honorary life member of the Returned & Services League of Australia.

In 1981, Neal was appointed to a committee tasked with reviewing Australia's Higher Defence Organisation. In 1992 he was awarded the United States Department of Defence Medal for Distinguished Public Service for his contribution in Chairing the Council that organised Australian events commemorating the 50th Anniversary of the Battle of the Coral Sea.

In 2009, Neal commenced his final role in public office, serving as Chair of the Veterans' Advisory Council in South Australia. This culminated in the opening of the Memorial Walk in Kintore Avenue. Neal retired from the position in 2016, concluding 76 years in private and public sector employment.

== Personal life and death ==
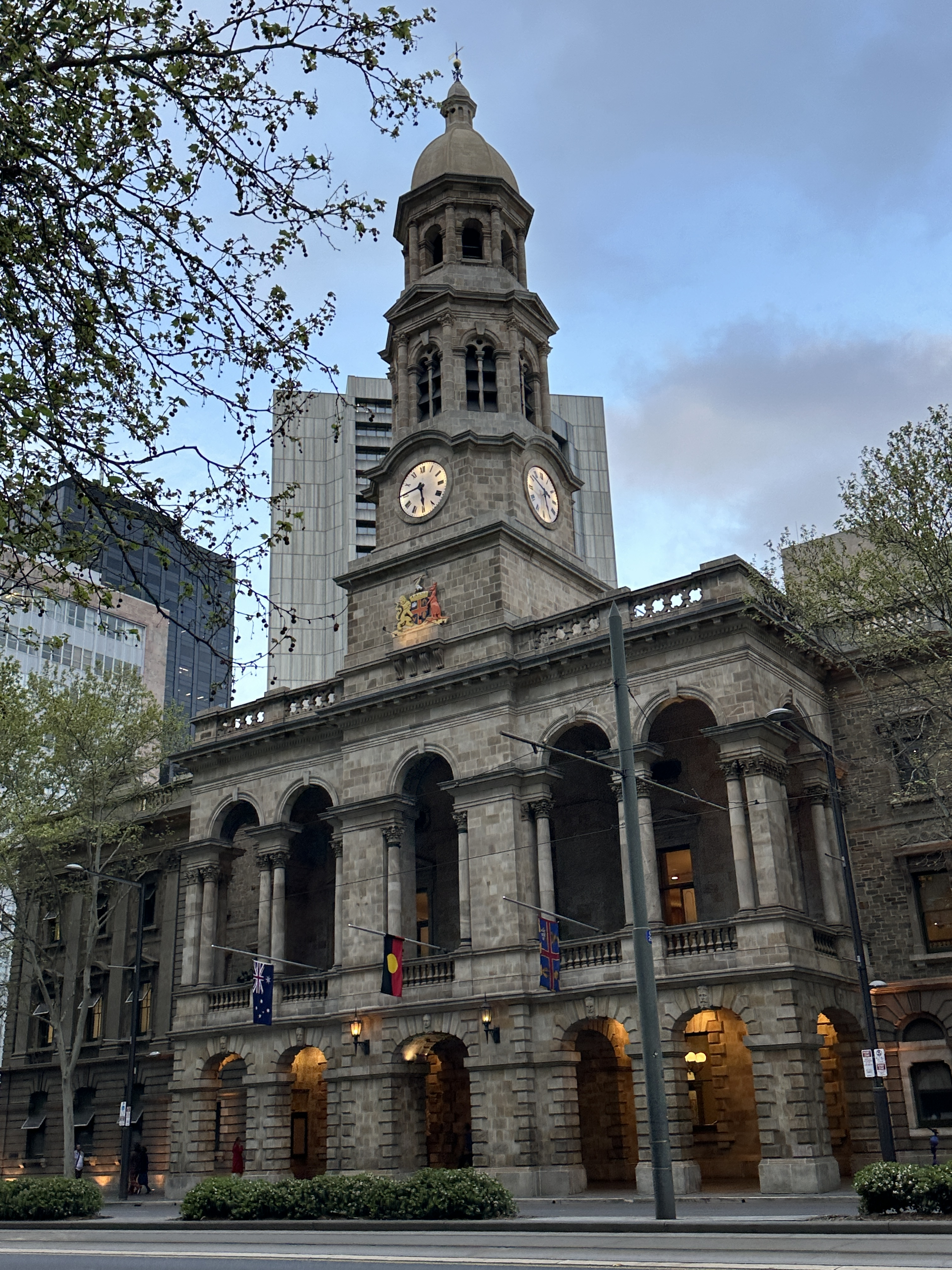
Adelaide Town Hall flags flown at half-mast during the State Memorial Service for Neal

Neal was born in London, England (newly part of the modern United Kingdom – as from 1922); and migrated with his family to Adelaide, Australia in February 1927. He became engaged to fifth-generation South Australian T. Joan Bowden in 1949; they were married at St Peter's Church, Glenelg in 1950, and their first son was born in 1951 in Broken Hill. A second son was born in 1963 in Ballarat. Neal and his wife were both predeceased by one of their three sons, Brian. Lady Thelma "Joan" Neal AM DstJ died in Adelaide on 28 February 2023.

He played football with the Adelaide University Soccer Club from 1946 to 1949 and eventually became the club's patron.

Neal turned 100 on 3 June 2024, and died on 2 September 2025, at the age of 101.

== Community ==
Neal was appointed (1984–1992) National Chair of the Duke of Edinburgh's International Award – Australia and an International Trustee of the Award from 1987 to 1997. He and his wife, Lady Joan Neal AM were World Fellows of The Duke of Edinburgh's Award International Association.

== Honours ==
- He was a Life Fellow of the Australian Institute of Company Directors
- He was one of only nine Honorary Fellows of the Australian Institute of Building
- Fellow of the Australian Institute of Management (FAIM)
- Fellow of (the Institution of) Engineers Australia (FIEAust)
- Fellow of the Institution of Gas Engineers and Managers (FIGEM) – UK
- The Sir Eric Neal Library at the University of South Australia was opened in his honour in 2001.
- A caricature of Eric Neal was donated to the National Portrait Gallery by the artist, Joe Greenberg, in 2001.
- Flinders University named its Engineering Building after him.
- On 17 April 2007, Sir Eric Neal accepted the offer of the Adelaide University Soccer Club Blacks invitation to become the club's patron.
- First Principal Patron of the Freemasons Foundation Centre for Men's Health at the University of Adelaide.
- Honorary doctorates from the University of Sydney, University of South Australia (1996) and Flinders University.
- Patron of the Port Adelaide Football Club.
- Gold Distinguished Service Medal, The Duke of Edinburgh's International Award – Australia (2016)

Companion of the Order of Australia (AC)	1988
Commander of the Royal Victorian Order (CVO)	1992
Knight Bachelor	1982
Knight of the Order of St John	1996
Centenary Medal	2001
Department of Defense Medal for Distinguished Public Service	1992
Distinguished Service Medal – Gold	2016

Business positions
Preceded by Sir James Foots	Chairman of Westpac Banking Corporation; 1989 – 1992	Succeeded by John Uhrig
Government offices
Preceded by Dame Roma Mitchell	Governor of South Australia; 1996 – 2001	Succeeded by Marjorie Jackson-Nelson
