= Ray Chen (engineer) =

American engineer

Ray Chen is an American engineer, who is currently the Keys and Joan Curry/Cullen Trust Endowed Chair in the Department of Electrical and Computer Engineering at the University of Texas at Austin. He is a fellow of the Institute of Electrical and Electronics Engineers, The Optical Society and SPIE.
