= Deirdre Jordan =

Australian academic and educator (1926–2026)

Sr Dr Deirdre Jordan RSM AC MBE FACE

Personal life
- Born: Deirdre Frances Jordan; 18 September 1926 Loxton, South Australia, Australia
- Died: 10 January 2026 (aged 99) Royal Adelaide Hospital, Adelaide, South Australia, Australia
- Resting place: West Terrace Cemetery
- Parents: Clement Jordan (father); Helena Jordan (née Roberts) (mother)
- Education: University of Adelaide
- Honors: AC MBE

Religious life
- Religion: Christian
- Denomination: Catholic
- Order: Sisters of Mercy
- Monastic name: Sister Mary Campion

Senior posting
- Post: Chancellor of Flinders University
- Period in office: 1988–2002
- Predecessor: Francis Robert Fisher AO
- Successor: Sir Eric Neal

Sister Dr Deirdre Frances Jordan RSM AC MBE FACE (18 September 1926 – 10 January 2026) was an Australian academic, educator and Catholic nun.

== Life and career ==
Jordan was born in Loxton, South Australia, on 18 September 1926 to Clement and Helena Jordan (née Roberts). She was educated at St Aloysius College in Adelaide, South Australia, and joined the Sisters of Mercy when she was 19. With a Bachelor of Arts degree, Jordan (then known as "Sister Mary Campion") took on the position of principal at St Aloysius College in 1954, remaining in the position until 1968.

While at St Aloysius, Jordan completed a master's degree in education at the University of Adelaide, becoming the first woman to do so. This led to a position as a lecturer at the University of Adelaide in sociology, where she remained until 1988. During this period she undertook a number of study tours, including to Tanzania, China and South America.

Jordan was appointed pro-chancellor of The Flinders University of South Australia in 1981 and subsequently chancellor in 1988. Retiring from the position in 2002 (delayed in order to fight plans for a merger between Flinders University and the University of Adelaide), she was granted the title of emeritus chancellor later that year.

Jordan became a Member of the Order of the British Empire (MBE) on 1 January 1969 for services to education. She was appointed a Companion of the Order of Australia (AC) on 26 January 1989.

Jordan died on 10 January 2026 at the age of 99.
