= Cori Stewart =

Australian innovator

- Born: Brisbane
- Occupation: CEO
- Employer: ARM Hub
- Known for: AI and Innovation

Cori Anne Stewart is an Australian innovator who is CEO of Advanced Robotics for Manufacturing Hub (ARM Hub), an Artificial Intelligence and robotics company and a 2023–2024 Superstar of STEM, an initiative within Science and Technology Australia.

== Education ==
Stewart received a bachelor of visual art from QUT, in 1997. In 2004, Stewart received a degree in public policy from Griffith University.

In 2009, she was awarded a Doctorate of Philosophy (Ph.D.) in creative industries from QUT.

In 2021 she completed the WiT Board Readiness Program. Her inspirations include Margaret Atwood, and Elizabeth Moss in Handmaid's Tale.

== Career ==
Stewart started her career as a visual artist, writing for newspapers about the arts. She was part of a Youth Arts Mentorship program, early in her career. She was then employed as a Creative City Policy Officer, with Brisbane City.

Stewart was an advisor in the Office of the Deputy Director General at the Department of the Premier and Cabinet from 2014 to 2015.

She was Director of Business Development at QUT from 2016 to 2019.

Stewart is founder and CEO of the Advanced Robotics for Manufacturing Hub (ARM Hub) since 2019. She works on partnerships with both industry stakeholders and universities to improve manufacturing processes, facilitate the commercialization of R&D endeavors, and improve capacity of the workforce.

== Media ==
Stewart has published in The Conversation, about manufacturing, robots, service industries and improving manufacturing technology. Her work on AI, robotics, design, gender equity in manufacturing, has been reported in various publications including the AFR. She has been an invited speaker in Manufacturing, digital and Robotics events as well as for Robotics podcasts, nationally around Australia.

== Awards ==
- 2017 – QUT Vice-Chancellor's Performance Award – Design Robotics for Mass Customisation.
- 2018 – QUT Vice-Chancellor's Research Award – Design Robotics for Mass Customisation.
- 2020 – Finalist Women in Industry Award – National Manufacturing Leadership Award.
- 2020 – Winner of Women in Technology's Professional Leadership Award.
- Cooperative Research Centre Association Award Best Project – Design Robotics.
- 2022 – Winner AI in Manufacturing Award – Women in AI Asia Pacific.
- 2022 – ARM Hub won ‘Best Knowledge Exchange Initiative’ Australasian Research Commercialisation Award.
- 2023 – Superstar of STEM, by Science Technology Australia.
- 2026 – Churchill Fellowship.
