= Carol Kulik =

Australian organizational psychologist

Carol T. Kulik is an Australia-based researcher who focuses on line managers, human resources, and diversity & inclusion. She is a Research Professor of Human Resource Management and a senior researcher within the Centre for Workplace Excellence at the University of South Australia. She is co-author of Human Resources for the Non-HR Manager (Routledge, 2023).

Kulik studied industrial-organizational psychology at the University of Illinois at Urbana–Champaign in the United States, and completed a doctorate in business administration, focusing on organizational behavior at the same institution. She taught at UIUC before moving to Arizona State University, then moved to Australia for a position at the University of Melbourne. Kulik later joined the University of South Australia Business School faculty as a research professor of human resource management. Over the course of her career, Kulik has been elected to fellowship of the Society for Industrial and Organizational Psychology, the Academy of Management, and the Academy of the Social Sciences in Australia (2017). She was an associate editor of the Academy of Management Journal and the Journal of Management, and served as the 2018–2019 president of the Academy of Management.
