= Stephen Gerlach =

Australian lawyer

Stephen Gerlach AM FAICD
- Born: Australia
- Occupations: Lawyer, company director

Stephen Gerlach, AM FAICD is an Australian lawyer, company director and corporate advisor. He was Chancellor of Flinders University in South Australia from 2010 to 2023, a former chairman of oil and gas company Santos Limited, and former managing partner of Finlaysons legal firm.

== Education ==
Stephen Gerlach studied at the University of Adelaide, where he obtained a law degree.

== Career ==
Gerlach worked at legal firm Finlaysons in Adelaide for 23 years, during which he held the position of managing partner from 1985 to 1991.

He has acted as chairman of numerous publicly listed companies, including Equatorial Mining Ltd, Elders Australia Ltd, Challenger Listed Investments Limited, Amdel Ltd, and Penrice Ltd. He held directors' positions on further public companies, including Southcorp Ltd, Elders Rural Bank, and Brunner Mond Holdings Ltd (UK).

He was chairman of Santos Ltd from 2001 until 2009, and of Elders Limited (formerly Futuris Corporation Ltd.) until December 2010.

Gerlach was appointed chancellor of Flinders University in 2010, replacing former South Australian Governor Sir Eric Neal in the role. He retired as chancellor on 30 September 2023, after serving almost 14 years.

== Other activities ==
Gerlach has also been actively involved in a number of community and professional associations and is currently a trustee of the Australian Cancer Research Foundation, a director of the General Sir John Monash Foundation, chairman of the Psychosis Trust, and chairman of the South Australian Cricket Association Nomination Committee. He was the inaugural chairman of Foodbank South Australia from 1999 to 2014.

== Honours ==
In 2009, Gerlach was awarded Member of the Order of Australia "for service to the provision of social welfare programs through Foodbank South Australia, and to the community."

In 2019 he was appointed a Distinguished Fellow of the Australian Institute of Company Directors.
