= PA Research Foundation =

Australian non-profit organization

- Founded: 1984
- Type: Non for Profit, Medical Research Foundation
- Purpose: Raising funds for medical research
- Location: Brisbane, Queensland, Australia
- Website: www.pafoundation.org.au

The PA Research Foundation (PARF) is an Australian nonprofit organization that raises funds for lifesaving research to develop better diagnoses and treatments for some of Australia’s biggest health challenges.

The Foundation does not receive any financial support from the government and is funded solely through donations from corporate sponsors, community fundraising and groups, events, donations and bequests from individuals.

== History ==
The Foundation was established in 1984 to raise funds for health and medical research, which includes grants, medical trials and vital equipment at the Princess Alexandra Hospital, Queensland’s leading research hospital and largest clinical trials centre. Gardasil, the cervical cancer vaccine discovered by PA Research Foundation board member Professor Ian Frazer and the Brisbane Technique for liver transplantation are two significant achievements from the Princess Alexandra Hospital.

== Fundraising and community activities ==
The PA Research Foundation is involved in a variety of events which help generate and raise significant funds. For over 12 years, the Foundation held Australia's Biggest Duck Race for Cancer Research, a fundraising event which saw over 40,000 rubber ducks race along the Brisbane River to raise funds for cancer research. The event concluded in October 2018.

The Foundation also hosts The Smiddy Fun Run, an annual race around the PA Hospital Campus held every November in memory of Adam Smiddy, a PA Hospital Physiotherapist whose life was cut short after being diagnosed with melanoma at the age of 26.

In 2019, the Foundation revamped its Art Union Program introducing their Lucky Duck Lottery, with funds raised through ticket sales supporting life-saving cancer research at the PA Hospital Campus.

Team PARF, the Foundation's online fundraising platform, encourages members of the community to participate in fundraising events to run, swim, cycle your way to lifesaving medical research.

== Campaigns ==
The Foundation also holds campaigns in collaboration with corporate partners, including Australian Leisure and Hospitality Group (ALH), Aveo Group, Stellarossa, and Australian Venue Co (AVC).

ALH Group has raised funds for Project Pink since 2010, raising more than $2.5 million for breast cancer research at the PA Hospital Campus. Aveo Group have also championed Project Pink since 2016, with communities across Australia coming together to raise over $750,000 for breast cancer research. Stellarossa Stores around Queensland have also supported Project Pink, fundraising for breast cancer research since 2015.

MANDATE - the Foundation's Men's Health Campaign, runs in AVC venues annually around Australia throughout the months of June and July. 2020 will be the 9th year MANDATE will run in AVC venues to raise funds for prostate cancer research, having raised over $1 million to date through the partnership.

== Research grants ==
Each year, the Foundation funds research projects proposed by the clinicians, scientists and health professionals on the Princess Alexandra Hospital campus. The Foundation receives applications from health researchers on the campus which are then assessed by the Research Committee, an independent team of qualified medical professionals, and awarded based on merit and funds available. All research funded by the Foundation goes through a rigorous selection process to ensure it is of genuine scientific merit, and does not replicate any other research anywhere in the world.

The philosophy of awarding research grants is to:

- Support researchers and projects on the path to securing competitive funding.
- Attract new researchers to the campus.
- Provide assistance to new researchers in the early stage of their research career and,
- Promote the culture of collaboration and group work within the PA research environment.

Through the grants, the PA Research Foundation has been able to fund equipment, research fellowships and postgraduate scholarships, studies and provide project support that directly benefit research projects in areas such as cervical cancer, prostate cancer, skin cancer, leukaemia, breast cancer, heart disease, immunology, kidney disease, diabetes, liver disease, transplantation, and arthritis.
