= Flinders University =

Public university in Adelaide, South Australia

- Shield
- Former names: The Flinders University of South Australia (1966–1991)
- Type: Public research university
- Established: 1 July 1966; 60 years ago
- Accreditation: TEQSA
- Academic affiliations: Innovative Research Universities (IRU)
- Budget: A$614.24 million (2023)
- Chancellor: John Hood
- Vice-Chancellor: Colin Stirling
- Academic staff: 957 (FTE, 2023)
- Administrative staff: 1,232 (FTE, 2023)
- Total staff: 2,189 (FTE, 2023)
- Students: 25,921 (2023)
- Location: Sturt Road, Bedford Park, Adelaide, South Australia, 5042, Australia
- Campus: Suburban, parkland, and regional
- Named after: Matthew Flinders
- Colours: Gold Midnight
- Sporting affiliations: UniSport; EAEN
- Website: flinders.edu.au

Flinders University, established as the Flinders University of South Australia, is an Australian public research university based in Adelaide, South Australia. Founded in 1966, it was named in honour of the British navigator Matthew Flinders, who had explored and surveyed the Australian coastline in the early 19th century. Flinders University became the oldest extant South Australian university, superseding the University of Adelaide, when the latter merged with the University of South Australia to create Adelaide University in early 2026.

The institution has a footprint extending across a number of locations in South Australia and the Northern Territory. The main campus is in Bedford Park, about 12 km (7.5 mi) south of the Adelaide city centre. Other campuses include Tonsley, Adelaide central business district, Renmark, Alice Springs and Darwin. There were 25,921 students enrolled in 2023.

== History ==
=== Origins and construction ===
By the late 1950s, the University of Adelaide's North Terrace campus was approaching capacity. In 1960, the Premier of South Australia, Thomas Playford, announced that 150 hectares (370 acres) of state government-owned land in Burbank (now Bedford Park) would be allocated to the University of Adelaide for the establishment of a second campus.

Planning began in 1961. The principal-designate of the new campus, the economist and professor Peter Karmel, was adamant that the new campus should operate independently from the North Terrace campus. He hoped that the Bedford Park campus would be free to innovate and not be bound by tradition.

Capital works began in 1962 with a grant of £3.8 million from the Australian Universities Commission. Architect Geoff Harrison, in conjunction with architectural firm Hassell, McConnell and Partners, designed a new university that, with future expansions, could eventually accommodate up to 6000 students.

=== Independence and opening ===
In 1965, the Australian Labor Party won the state election and Frank Walsh became premier. The ALP wished to break up the University of Adelaide's hegemony over tertiary education in the state and announced that they intended the Bedford Park campus to be an independent institution.

Coat of arms adopted as the university's founding logo in 1966 and used until 2022

On 17 March 1966, a bill was passed by state parliament officially creating The Flinders University of South Australia. Although the Labor Party had favoured the name "University of South Australia", academic staff wished that the university be named after a "distinguished but uncontroversial" person. They settled upon British navigator Matthew Flinders, who explored and surveyed the South Australian coastline in 1802. Its original coat of arms, designed by a professor in the Fine Arts faculty, included a reproduction of Flinders' ship Investigator and his journal A Voyage to Terra Australis, open to the page in which Flinders described the coast adjacent the campus site.

Flinders University was opened by Queen Elizabeth, the Queen Mother, on 25 March 1966.

Originally created as an extension of the University of Adelaide, the university council resolved in August 1965 that it would become a separate and independent institution, functioning under its own council, from 1 July 1966. Peter Karmel was the first vice-chancellor. Teaching at "the University of Adelaide at Bedford Park" began in 1966 with 400 students.

A significant early initiative was the decision to build the Flinders Medical Centre (FMC) on land adjacent to the campus and to base the university's medical school within this new public hospital – the first such integration in Australia. Flinders accepted undergraduate medical students in 1974, with the FMC opening the following year.

=== Expansion and restructuring ===
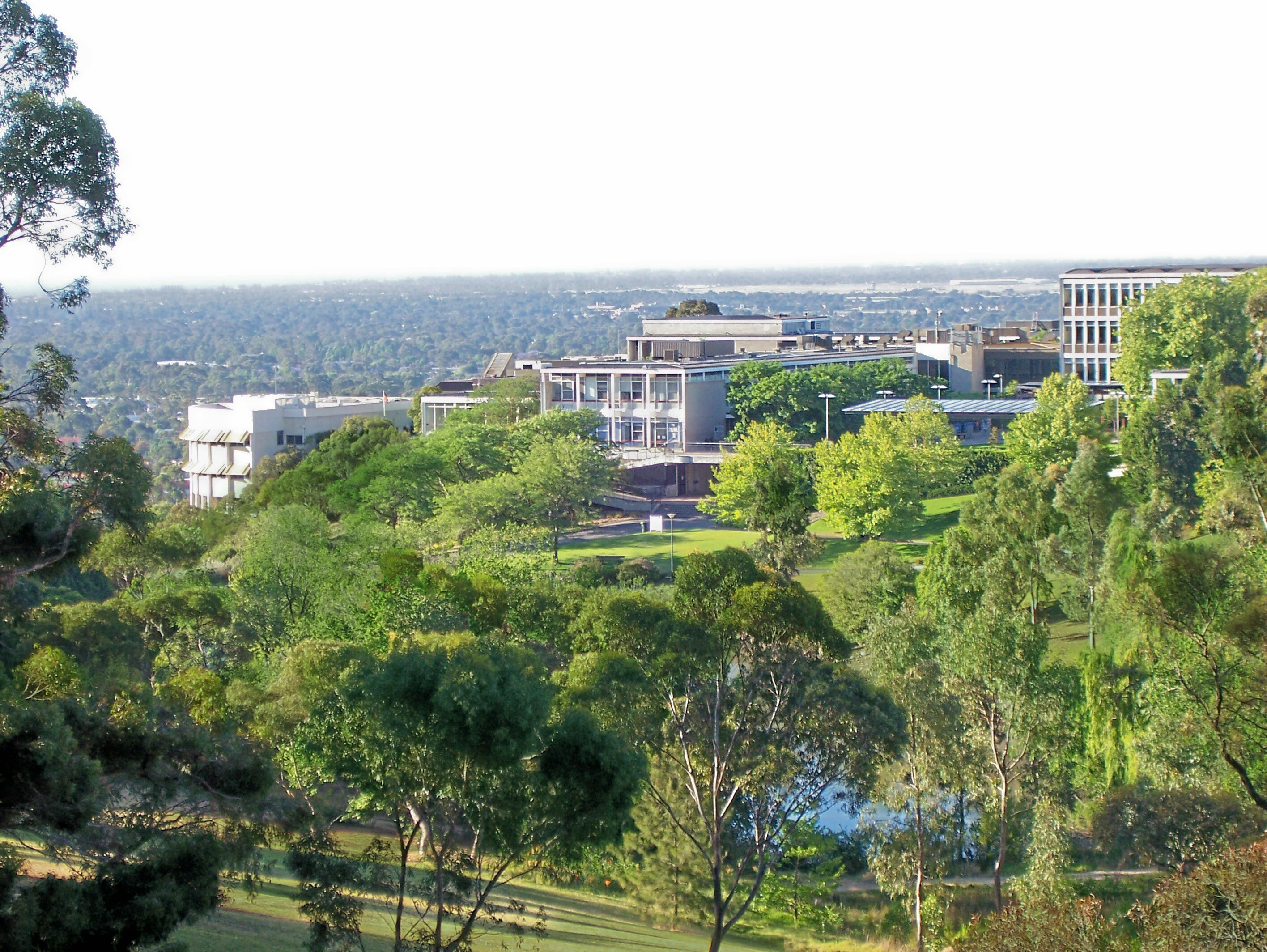
View of Flinders University main campus, with central plaza and lakeside area visible.

In 1990, the biggest building project on campus since the mid-1970s saw work commence on three new buildings – Law and Commerce; Engineering; and Information Science and Technology. Approval for the establishment of a School of Engineering was given in 1991 and degrees in Electrical and Electronic Engineering, and Biomedical Engineering were established shortly afterwards.

In 1991, as part of a restructuring of higher education in South Australia, Flinders merged with the adjacent Sturt Campus of the former South Australian College of Advanced Education.

In 1992, a four-faculty structure was adopted.

In 1998, the Centre for Remote Health, a rural teaching hospital based in Alice Springs, was established jointly with the Northern Territory University (now Charles Darwin University). This was expanded further in 2011 with the establishment of the Northern Territory Medical Program.

Since 2000, the university has established new disciplines in areas including physiotherapy, occupational therapy and more disciplines in engineering.

In 2011, the bacteria genus Flindersiella was named after the university after the strain was found on a tree on campus grounds.

In 2015, the university opened a new campus at Tonsley, the former site of the Mitsubishi Motors Australia plant in Southern Adelaide. This campus houses the university's School of Computer Science, Engineering and Mathematics, along with the Medical Device Research Institute, the Centre for Nanoscale Science and Technology (now known as the Flinders Institute for Nanoscale Science & Technology) and Flinders technology start-up company Re-Timer.

In 2016, the university celebrated its 50th anniversary with a calendar of public events, and a publication summarising the highlights of the university's history, research and alumni achievements over the last 50 years. The year also saw the opening of the award-winning student hub and plaza, transforming the central campus.

The university's strategic plan, Making a Difference - The 2025 Agenda, released in 2016 set an ambitious vision for the coming decade for Flinders to reach the top ten of Australian universities, and the top one per cent in the world.

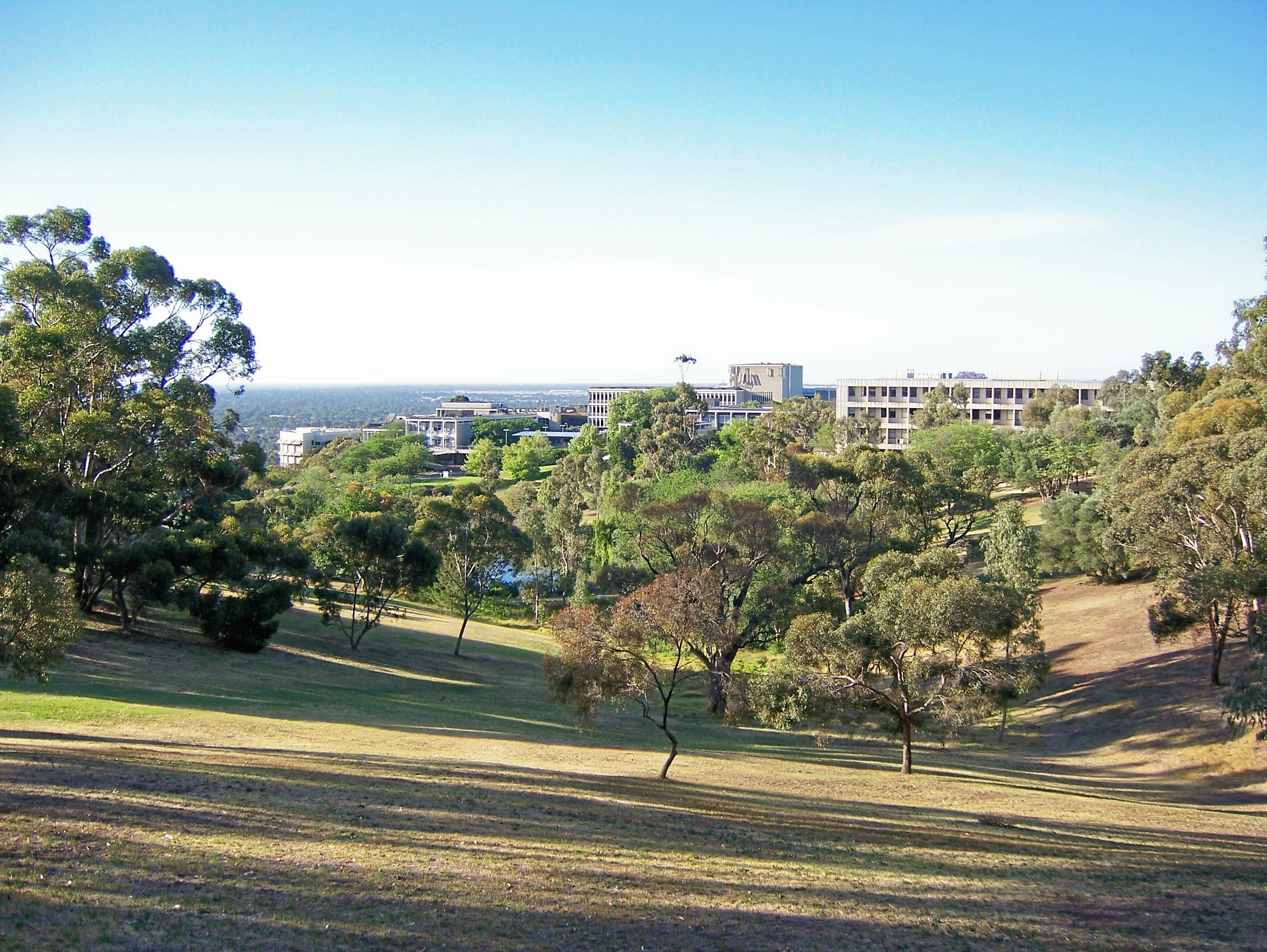
View of Flinders University main campus and lake from hill.

On 1 July 2017, the university restructured from a two-tier academic system of four faculties and fourteen schools, to a single-tier structure consisting of six colleges.

In 2019, the university announced an additional $100 million investment in research and a further $100 million in education over a five-year period to support it to meet its strategic goals.

The university also in 2019 announced plans for a substantial development on a tract on land on the northern portion of the Bedford Park Campus adjacent to the Flinders hospitals precinct. Known as "Flinders Village" the decade-long development will deliver research facilities, student accommodation, commercial premises and amenities. The catalyst for the initiative was the extension of the Clovelly Park rail line to the Flinders precinct. The $141m rail line and Flinders Station project began operation in December 2020. Stage one of the Flinders Village development is the construction of a health and medical research building. Construction began in December 2021 and the building, which will be home to the Flinders Health and Medical Research Institute, was scheduled for completion in 2024.

In 2021, the university announced that it would be expanding its Adelaide CBD presence, establishing a vertical campus as the anchor tenant in Festival Tower, a major development scheduled for completion in 2024 adjacent to Parliament House and the Adelaide Railway Station on North Terrace.

In 2022, the newly elected state Labor government led by Peter Malinauskas proposed setting up a commission to investigate the possibility of a merger of South Australia's three public universities: the University of South Australia (UniSA), the University of Adelaide, and Flinders University. The University of Adelaide and UniSA decided to merge, while Flinders remained independent. This made it the oldest extant South Australian university, when the two other universities merged to become Adelaide University.

== Governance and structure ==
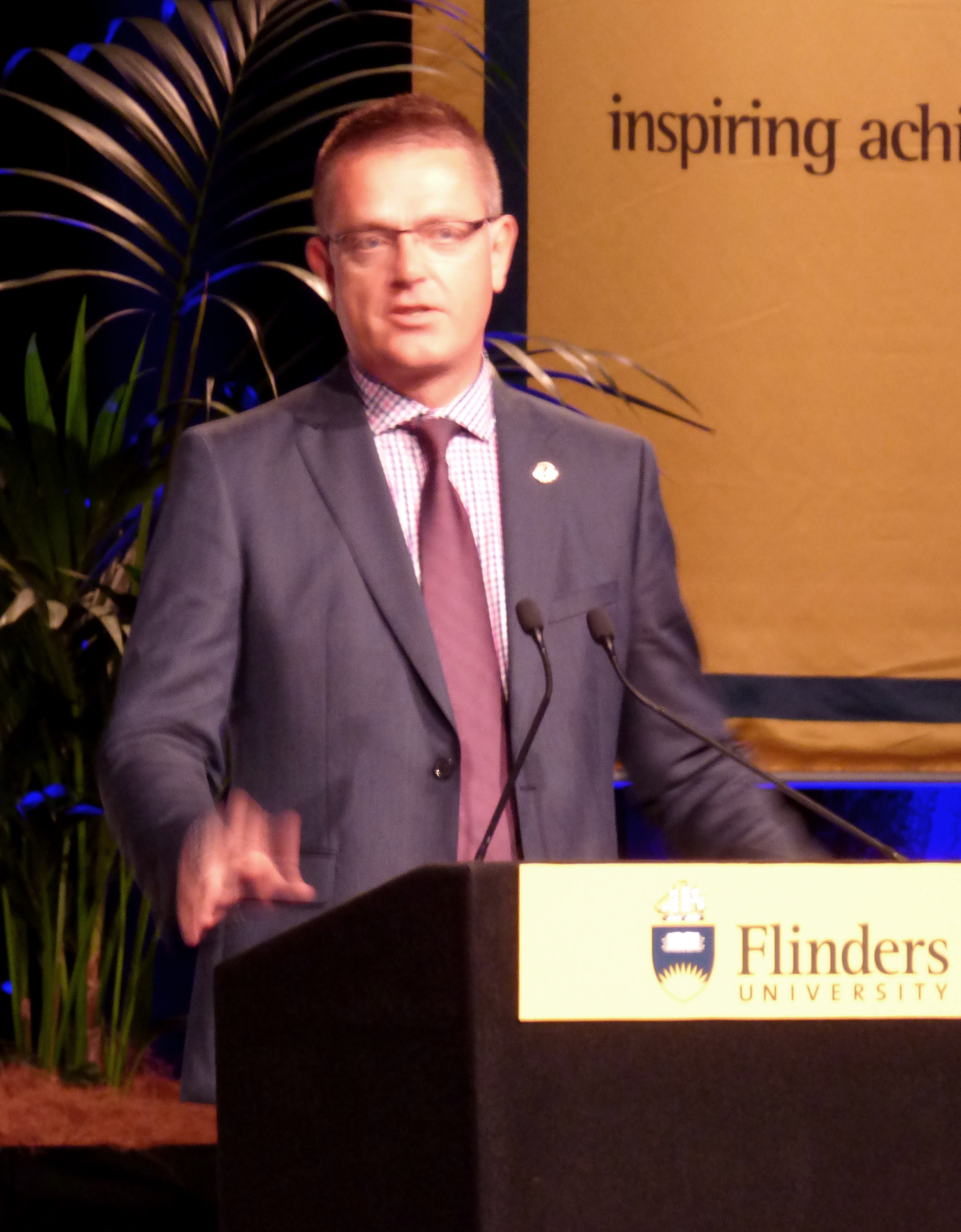
Colin Stirling, vice-chancellor (2015–present)

The university is accredited by the Tertiary Education Quality and Standards Agency.

=== University council ===
The responsibilities of the university council are set out in the Flinders University Act and include:

- appointing vice-chancellors as chief executive officer of the university and monitoring their performance
- approving the mission and strategic direction of the university as well as the annual budget and business plan
- overseeing and reviewing the management of the university and its performance

==== Chancellor and vice-chancellor ====
The chief executive consists of the president and vice-chancellor, who is supported by the senior executive team. The senior executive team includes the vice-president and executive dean of each of the six colleges. As of August 2024 the vice-chancellor is Colin Stirling.

The chancellor is John Hood, a chartered accountant and alumnus of the university, who has served two terms on the council (since 2004).

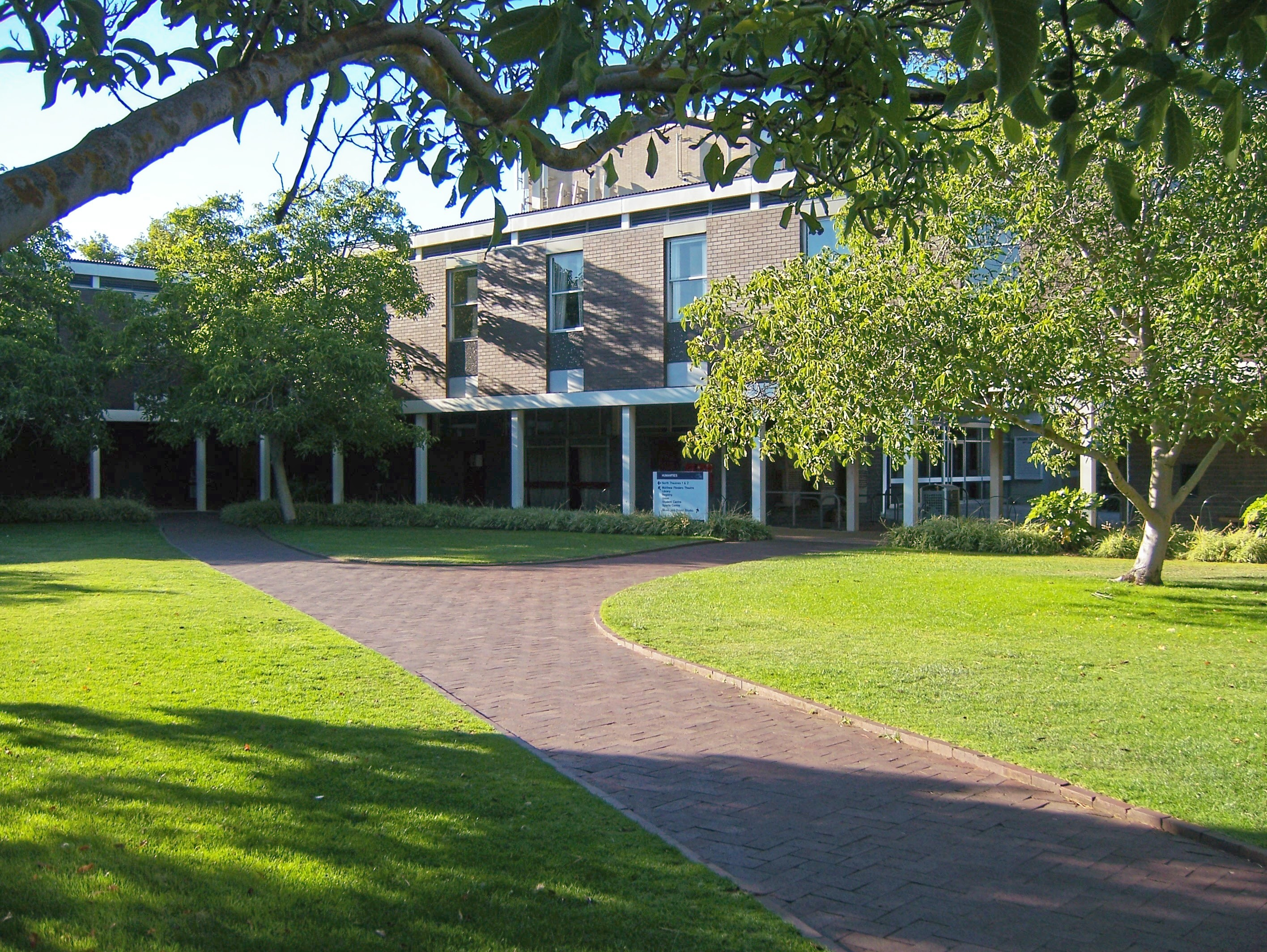
View of the courtyard of the humanities building

=== Constituent colleges ===
There are six colleges, covering teaching and research expertise in various areas:

- College of Business, Government and Law
- College of Education, Psychology and Social Work
- College of Humanities, Arts and Social Sciences
- College of Medicine and Public Health
- College of Nursing and Health Sciences
- College of Science and Engineering

==== College of Business, Government and Law ====
As of 2025 the College of Business, Government and Law includes three research centres:

- Australian Industrial Transformation Institute (AITI)
- Jeff Bleich Centre for Democracy and Disruptive Technologies (JBC; after Jeff Bleich)
- Centre for Social Impact

==== College of Humanities, Arts and Social Sciences ====
The College of Humanities, Arts and Social Sciences is subdivided into three areas:

- Creative Arts and Media. Specialisations include acting, directing, visual arts, film and television and visual effects.
  - Drama was established as a foundational area of study in 1967 under playwright Wal Cherry. A review was undertaken in the years leading up to 2022 and four new permanent academic staff were appointed. The Flinders Drama Centre started offering professional acting and directing programs in 1971. Many successful actors, directors and playwrights are alumni of the centre. Alumni include the founding members of many performance groups of different types, including Circus Oz, the Angels, Redgum and Brink Productions. is where Bachelor of Creative Arts (Drama) students study, and includes the 425-seat Matthew Flinders Theatre.
  - Bachelor of Creative Arts Screen (BCA) was introduced in 2002 and proved both popular and successful, with graduates winning awards and placements in the film industry, in jobs such as production managers, editors, sound recordists, producers, and directors, in television, new media, and feature films.
- Humanities and Social Sciences. As of 2024 there are 24 majors available in the Bachelor of Arts degree, and the only Bachelor of Archaeology in the state, as well as diplomas and postgraduate degrees.
- Languages, Culture and Tourism. A variety of modern languages are taught at undergraduate level for Bachelor of Languages or Bachelor of Arts, as well as applied linguistics and Indigenous and Australian culture; in addition, undergraduate and postgraduate degrees are offered in Teaching English to Speakers of Other Languages (TESOL)

=== Finances ===
In 2022, the university's budget was A$516.79 million. It had 907 full-time academic and 1,147 administrative members of staff (total 2,054).

== Campuses and buildings ==
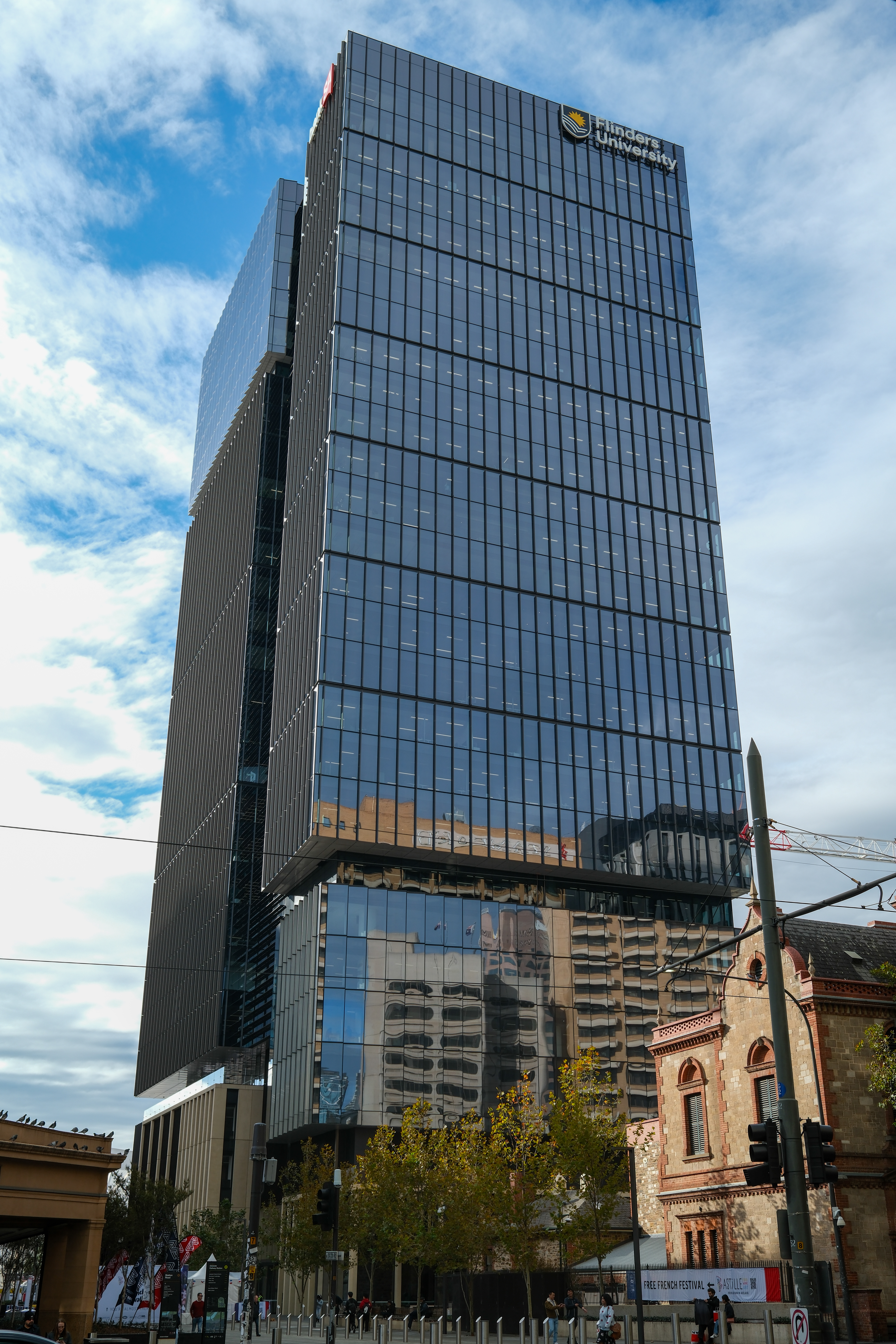
City campus

Flinders' main campus at Bedford Park in Adelaide's southern suburbs is set upon 156 acres (63 ha) of gardens and native bushland, about 12 km (7.5 mi) south of the Adelaide city centre. Other campuses include Tonsley, Adelaide central business district, Renmark, Alice Springs, and Darwin.

The city campus is on North Terrace, in the centre of the city. It also maintains a number of external teaching facilities in regional South Australia, south-west Victoria and the Northern Territory. As of 2020 international students made up 19.5% of the on-campus student population and a number of offshore programmes are also offered, primarily in the Asia-Pacific region.

The university website acknowledges that its campuses cover land traditionally associated with a number of Aboriginal Australian peoples, including Arrernte, Dagoman, Jawoyn, Kaurna, Larrakia Ngadjuri, Ngarrindjeri, Ramindjeri, and Warumungu peoples.

== Academic profile ==
The university is a member of the Innovative Research Universities network, which comprises seven universities "committed to inclusive excellence in teaching and research in Australia".

Flinders University is also affiliated with the following institutions:

- Australian Science and Mathematics School, a coeducational public senior high school for senior years, located on the Bedford Park campus
- Flinders Medical Centre, a large teaching hospital, co-located with the university
- Helpmann Academy, an organisation supporting opportunities for emerging practitioners in the performing and visual arts; in partnership with the University of Adelaide and UniSA

=== Academic reputation ===
University rankings

Global – Overall
- ARWU World: 401–500 (2025)
- CWTS World: 524 (Note: The CWTS Leiden Ranking is based on P (top 10%).) (2024)
- QS World: 387 (2026)
- THE World: 301–350 (2026)
- USNWR Global: =434 (25/26)

National – Overall
- ARWU National: 21–24 (2025)
- CWTS National: 22 (2024)
- ERA National: 21 (2018)
- QS National: 21 (2026)
- THE National: 21–22 (2026)
- USNWR National: 25 (25/26)
- AFR National: =17 (2025)

In the 2024 Aggregate Ranking of Top Universities, which measures aggregate performance across the QS, THE and ARWU rankings, the university attained a position of #313 (23rd nationally).

National publications

In the Australian Financial Review Best Universities Ranking 2025, the university was tied #17 amongst Australian universities.

Global publications

In the 2026 Quacquarelli Symonds World University Rankings (published 2025), the university attained a position of #387 (21st nationally).

In the Times Higher Education World University Rankings 2026 (published 2025), the university attained a position of #301–350 (tied 21–22nd nationally).

In the 2025 Academic Ranking of World Universities, the university attained a position of #401–500 (tied 21–24th nationally).

In the 2025–2026 U.S. News & World Report Best Global Universities, the university attained a tied position of #434 (25th nationally).

In the CWTS Leiden Ranking 2024, the university attained a position of #524 (22nd nationally).

=== Student outcomes ===
The Australian Government's QILT (Note: Abbreviation for Quality Indicators for Learning and Teaching.) conducts national surveys documenting the student life cycle from enrolment through to employment. These surveys place more emphasis on criteria such as student experience, graduate outcomes and employer satisfaction than perceived reputation, research output and citation counts.

In the 2023 Employer Satisfaction Survey, graduates of the university had an overall employer satisfaction rate of 78%.

In the 2023 Graduate Outcomes Survey, graduates of the university had a full-time employment rate of 76.6% for undergraduates and 90.3% for postgraduates. The initial full-time salary was A$70,000 for undergraduates and A$93,900 for postgraduates.

In the 2023 Student Experience Survey, undergraduates at the university rated the quality of their entire educational experience at 78.7% meanwhile postgraduates rated their overall education experience at 74.6%.

== Student life ==
=== Student demographics ===
In 2022, there were 25,247 students enrolled across all campuses.

=== Student union ===
Flinders University Student Association (FUSA), formerly Student Association of Flinders University (SAFU), is a student union.

=== Student newspaper ===
Empire Times is Flinders University's student newspaper. It has been published by the Flinders University Student Association since 1969, but ceased publication in 2006 as a result of voluntary student unionism, before resuming in 2013 with the reintroduction of SSAF. The founder and first editor of the newspaper was Martin Fabinyi, and the newspaper was originally printed in the back of his house by fellow student Rod Boswell. Empire Times had a history of controversial humour and anti-establishment discussion. Notable former editors and contributors included Martin Armiger and Greig (HG Nelson) Pickhaver, Steph Key, and Kate Ellis.

=== Sports and athletics ===
Flinders University has many sports teams that compete in social and competitive competitions. It has affiliated sporting clubs, including aikido, athletics, badminton, basketball, cricket, fencing, football, hockey, judo, lacrosse, men's soccer, netball, squash, table tennis, volleyball, and women's soccer.

=== Student accommodation ===
Flinders has two options for on-campus accommodation:

- University Hall (catered)
- Deirdre Jordan Village (self-catered)

For off-campus accommodation, Flinders Living run a free, up-to-date accommodation service which lists private accommodation available on the rental market.

The university has also partnered with a student accommodation facility located in the city called The Switch, which provides rooms, shared facilities and living areas.

== Events ==
=== Wal Cherry Lecture ===
The biennial Wal Cherry Lecture is held in honour of prolific playwright Wal Cherry, who was foundation professor of drama from 1967. He also chaired the school of language and literature (which became the school of humanities) from 1968 to 1970, and the theatre management committee in from 1968 until 1978, and was dean of University Hall in from 1970 to 1974.

In 2024, Flinders graduate Scott Hicks' 1982 documentary film about the 11th Adelaide Festival of the Arts under artistic director, Jim Sharman, titled The Hall of Mirrors: A Festival, was screened at the Space Theatre in the Adelaide Festival Centre, followed by a conversation with the two men. The 2024 lecture, presented by the Assemblage Centre for Creative Arts at Flinders, in partnership with the Helpmann Academy and the Don Dunstan Foundation, was part of the celebration of 50 Years of Flinders Drama Centre.

== Notable people ==
=== Notable alumni ===
Graduates of Flinders University include:

- Australian of the Year: Richard Harris
- Fields Medalist (for maths): Terence Tao
- Several Rhodes scholars

=== Past chancellors and vice-chancellors ===
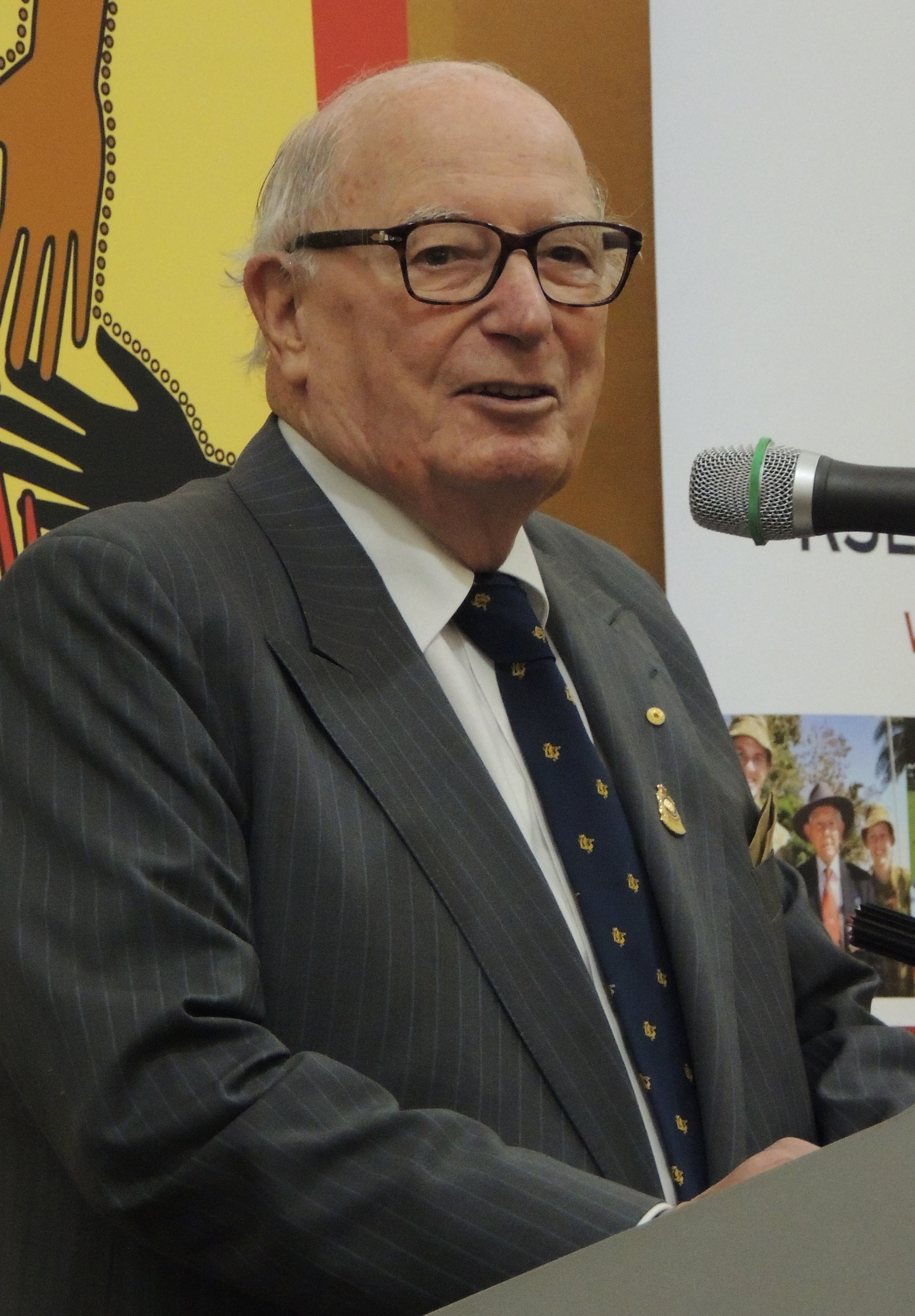
Sir Eric Neal, Chancellor of Flinders University (2002–2010)

Flinders University has been served by seven chancellors and eight vice-chancellors since its establishment in 1966. They are:

Name	Years	Position
Peter Karmel AC CBE	1966–1971	Vice-Chancellor
Sir Mark Ledingham Mitchell FRACI	1966–1970	Chancellor
The Hon. Sir Charles Hart Bright KBE	1971–1983	Chancellor
Roger Russell	1972–1979	Vice-Chancellor
Keith Jackson Hancock AO FASSA	1980–1987	Vice-Chancellor
The Hon. Justice Francis Robert Fisher AO QC	1983–1988	Chancellor
John Francis Lovering AO	1987–1995	Vice-Chancellor
Sr Dr Deirdre Jordan AC MBE	1988–2002	Chancellor
Ian Chubb AC	1995–2000	Vice-Chancellor
Anne Rosalie Edwards AO FASSA FACE	2001–2007	Vice-Chancellor
The Hon. Sir Eric Neal AC CVO KStJ	2002–2010	Chancellor
Michael Barber AO	2008–2014	Vice-Chancellor
Stephen Gerlach AM	2010–2023	Chancellor
Colin Stirling	2015–present	Vice-Chancellor
John Hood FAICD	2023–present	Chancellor

=== Interim vice-chancellors ===
Throughout its history, Flinders has had at least twelve distinct Acting Vice-Chancellors; each of whom performed the role at least once (and often on multiple occasions). The most notable interim office-holders were:

Name	Years	Position
Ray Chan	2024–2025	Acting Vice-Chancellor (intermittent)
Phyllis Tharenou	2019	Acting Vice-Chancellor

=== Past Pro-Chancellors and Deputy Chancellors ===
The most notable of the ten previous Pro-chancellors (1966–2005), and eight (Note: Current figure including all present and former office-holders (since 2005, when the position was established). Last updated: 9 June 2026.) current and former Deputy Chancellors (2005–present), are as follows:

Name	Years	Position
Douglas Gautier AM	2023–2025	Deputy Chancellor
The Hon. Chief Justice John Doyle AC KC	1988–2000	Pro-Chancellor
Sr Dr Deirdre Jordan	1981–1988	Pro-Chancellor
Sir Charles Bright	1966–1971	Pro-Chancellor

== See also ==
- AusStage
- Flinders University AusStage Prize
- List of universities in Australia
