= Student unionism in Australia =

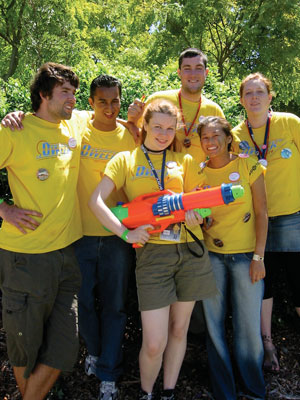
Aside from their political role, student unions organise on-campus activities, such as the popular Orientation Week program at the University of New South Wales.

Australia's universities are home to a variety of different student union groups, providing a range of political, commercial and other services to students. The sector has undergone substantial change in recent years, with a decline in participation, intervention by university administrations, and the end of compulsory membership arrangements.

Although names such as union, student association, representative council and guild are common, in practice they provide little insight into an organisation's role on campus. In addition, some organisations have chosen to rebrand using entirely new names, with the term "union" in particular considered to be the source of misunderstandings about their role. Students at Macquarie University and Arc at the University of New South Wales are examples of this trend. Where campus unions are being replaced with university-owned corporate entities, non-traditional names such as UWS Connect and UniCentre are becoming common.

== History ==
=== The rise of Australian student unions ===
The National Union of Australian University Students was formed in 1937, and held its first council meeting in 1938. The meetings were held annually and council members would initially discuss issues of textbook availability, scholarship awards, and daily student, though during World War II, the council would also discuss the extent to which universities and university students should be able to support the war efforts.

In the 1950s, the composition of the student body changed radically. The Menzies Government founded new technically oriented universities, like the University of New South Wales, and expanded the role of the technical tertiary colleges. This was in response to a perceived lack of graduate labour in the Australian economy

=== Voluntary student unionism ===
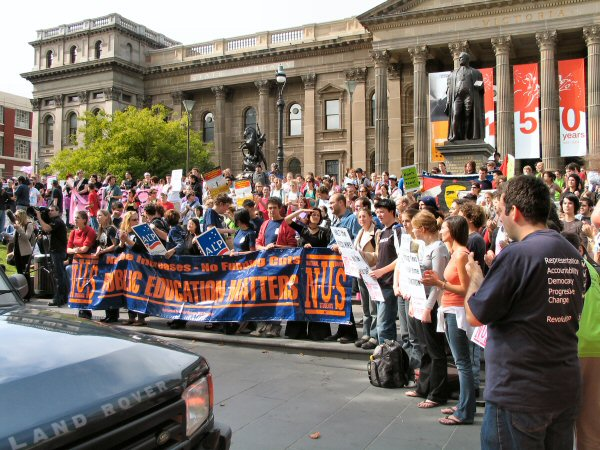
Students rally outside the Victorian State library to protest cuts to education funding and reductions in the quality of student income support.

A new National Union of Students was established to replace AUS, this time with a structure designed to make it harder for constituent organisations to disaffiliate. The collapse of AUS coincided with a hardening of attitudes on the right of politics towards student unionism. State and federal Liberal parties began to consider policies to stop student organisations from using funding from compulsory universal membership on left-wing political activities.

== Union Structure ==
Campus unions have traditionally been responsible for the provision of commercial services, such as food and retail outlets, and activity programs, such as those associated with orientation week.

=== Dual-structure ===
Campus unions that operate as part of a dual structure are in which an organisationally separate student council is present. Even among dual-structure campuses, organisational structure differs markedly.

| University | Student Representative Council | Service Organisation |
|---|---|---|
| Australian National University | Australian National University Students' Association | Australian National University Union (Note ANU Union is solely responsible for running businesses, all services provided by ANUSA. |
| Macquarie University | Macquarie University Students' Council | Students at Macquarie |
| RMIT University | RMIT Student Union | RMIT Union |
| Southern Cross University | Southern Cross University Students' Association | Southern Cross University Union |
| Swinburne University of Technology | Swinburne Student Union | Swinburne Student Amenities Association (University owned, operated and controlled) |
| University of Adelaide | Adelaide University Student Representative Council | Adelaide University Union |
| University of Canberra | University of Canberra Students' Representative Council | University of Canberra Union |
| University of New England | University of New England Student Association (UNESA) | University of New England Student Association (UNESA) |
| University of Newcastle | Newcastle University Students' Association,| Newcastle University Postgraduate Students' Association | UoN Services Limited, Campus Central & NUSport |
| University of Sydney | University of Sydney Students Representative Council | University of Sydney Union |
| University of the Sunshine Coast | University of the Sunshine Coast Student Representative Council | |
| University of Technology, Sydney | UTS Students' Association | UTS Union |
| University of New South Wales | UNSW SRC | Arc @ UNSW |

=== Single-structure ===
Campus unions that operate as part of a single structure, are in which student council services are provided by a division or department of the union.

| University | Union |
|---|---|
| Central Queensland University | Central Queensland University Student Association |
| Charles Sturt University | Charles Sturt University Student Senate |
| Curtin University of Technology | Curtin Student Guild |
| Deakin University | Deakin University Student Association |
| Edith Cowan University | Edith Cowan University Student Guild |
| Flinders University | Flinders University Student Association |
| Griffith University | Griffith University Student Representative Council |
| James Cook University | James Cook University Student Association |
| La Trobe University | La Trobe Student Union |
| La Trobe University, Bendigo | Bendigo Student Association |
| Monash University, Clayton | Monash Student Association |
| Murdoch University | Murdoch Guild |
| Queensland University of Technology | Queensland University of Technology Student Guild |
| University of Melbourne | University of Melbourne Student Union |
| University of Queensland | University of Queensland Union |
| University of South Australia | University of South Australia Students Association |
| University of Tasmania | Tasmanian University Student Association |
| University of Western Australia | University of Western Australia Student Guild |
| Western Sydney University | WSU Student Representative Council |
| Victoria University | Victoria University Student Union |

=== Postgraduate organisations ===
At many universities, postgraduate students are represented by separate student organisations. Given the smaller numbers - and relative time-poverty - of postgrads, these organisations tend to be smaller and are significantly under-resourced when compared to general or undergraduate groups. At a national level, postgrads are represented by the Council of Australian Postgraduate Associations.

== National organisations ==
- National Union of Students
- National Association of Australian University Colleges
- Council of Australian Postgraduate Associations
- Council of International Students Australia
- Australian Student Environment Network

== See also ==
- Students' union
- National Union of Students of Australia
- List of universities in Australia
- Voluntary student unionism
- List of student newspapers in Australia
