= List of student publications in Australia =

Listed are student publications in Australia. Most are published by student unions.

== National ==
- Previously National U, U, Axis, National Student, Student In Australia, The Student Leader and Student View

== Australian Capital Territory ==
- Curieux, University of Canberra and previously CUrio
- Woroni, ANU Observer, Demos Journal and The Monsoon Project, Australian National University

== New South Wales ==
- Grapeshot, Macquarie University and previously Arena, Muscateer and The Word
- Honi Soit, University of Sydney, Pulp and previously BULL
- Hungappa, (previously Barph from 1975 -1988), at the Wagga Wagga campus and
- Interpellator (Interp) at the Bathurst campus, Charles Sturt University. Not circulated from 2016 to 2021.
- Neucleus, University of New England
- Opus and Yak, University of Newcastle
- FLUNK, Southern Cross University and previously Pulp SCUM and Properganda
- Tertangala, University of Wollongong
- Noise (independent), Blitz (run by Arc) Gamamari (Formerly Tharunka, run by Arc), Arcadia (run by Arc, Paddington campus) and Framework (run by Arc, Paddington campus), University of New South Wales and previously Zing Tycoon (Paddington campus).
- Vertigo and Central News, University of Technology, Sydney
- W'SUP, Western Sydney University and previously HAC, TWOT, Nepean Echo, 1st Edition, Jumbunna, Berzerk, Hemlock, The Western Onion, Degreeº and Cruwsible

== Northern Territory ==
- Flycatcher, Charles Darwin University and previously Delirra and The Beard

== Queensland ==
- Bound, Bond University and previously Scope and Bond Briefs
- Getamungstit (Gold Coast campus), Griffith University and previously Gravity (Nathan campus) and Arbiter (Nathan campus)
- The Student Correspondent (Independent), University of the Sunshine Coast
- Semper Floreat, University of Queensland
- The Ashes, University of Southern Queensland and previously The Rambler
- The Bullsheet, James Cook University and previously Bedlam and The Hack
- Glass Magazine, Queensland University of Technology and previously CirQUTry, Utopia and Definite Article
- Previously The Rattler and Pipeline, Central Queensland University

== South Australia ==
- Empire Times, Flinders University and previously Libertine
- On Dit, Adelaide University (formerly University of Adelaide)
- On The Record, Adelaide University (formerly University of South Australia)
- Previously Verse, University of South Australia, also known as Entropy and UniLifeMag

== Tasmania ==
- Togatus, University of Tasmania

== Victoria ==
- Catalyst and The Swanston Gazette, RMIT University, and previously Don't Panic (Bundoora campus), Flip (Phillip Institute of Technology) and Plexus (Preston Institute of Technology)
- Evolve, Royal Gurkhas Institute of Technology Australia
- Farrago, University of Melbourne and previously Postgraduate Review, Spark (VCA campus), Griffin and Farrago-Griffin
- Fedpress, Federation University and previously Bootleg, Hotch Potch, Oxalian (Gippsland campus), Emit (Gippsland campus), Winston (Gippsland campus) and Ink (Berwick campus)
- Hyde, Victoria University of Technology and previously Genesis, NoName and Seed
- Lot's Wife (Clayton campus) and Esperanto (Caulfield campus), Monash University and previously Chaos, Naked Wasp and Otico (Caulfield and Peninsula campus)
- Rabelais Student Media, La Trobe University and previously Missing Link and 3rd Degree (Bendigo campus)
- Swine, Swinburne University of Technology and previously Tabula Rasa
- Wordly, Deakin University and previously Spurious Logic (Rusden campus) and Crossfire
- Previously The Worm, intercampus

== Western Australia ==
- Dircksey, Edith Cowan University and previously Harambee, G-Spot and GSM
- Grok, Curtin University of Technology
- Metior, Murdoch University
- Onyx, Blackstone Society, UWA
- Pelican, University of Western Australia
- Perth International Law Journal, UWA International Law Club
- Western Australian Student Law Review
- Previously Quasimodo, University of Notre Dame

== High school ==
- Lion's Roar, Wesley College (St Kilda Road campus)
- Parallel, Nossal High School
- Purple Haze, Wesley College (Glen Waverley campus)
- Sentinel, Melbourne High School
- Censored, Newington College
- Tiger, Sydney Grammar School

== See also ==
- Student publication
- List of student newspapers
- List of student newspapers in Canada
- List of student newspapers in the United Kingdom
- List of student newspapers in the United States of America
