= Council of International Students Australia =

Council of International Students Australia (CISA)
- Successor: International Students Representative Council of Australia
- Founded: 7 July 2010
- Dissolved: 2023
- Type: Peak international students representative body
- Region served: Australia
- Website: cisa.edu.au

The Council of International Students Australia, or CISA, was the peak representative body for international students in Australia. CISA was founded on 7 July 2010 in Hobart, Tasmania and provided member associations with representation to the Federal government, and peak bodies such as the Australian Research Council, English Australia, ACPET (Australian Council for Private Education and Training, TAFE Directors Australia and Universities Australia, on issues affecting international students in Australia.

Recognising the overlap between undergraduate, postgraduate, domestic and international students, CISA worked in collaboration with the National Union of Students and Council of Australian Postgraduate Associations where matters impacted all students, such as voluntary student unionism and travel concessions.

== History ==
Following the collapse of the National Liaison Committee for International Students in Australia in 2008, international students lacked a legitimate and credible national representative body to advocate on their behalf. In July 2010, 52 student, ethnic and community organisations gathered in Hobart, Tasmania to formally constitute a new peak representative organisation, CISA, at an Inaugural General Meeting (IGM).

The IGM was the culmination of two years of discussion among representative bodies and international students. The process was supported by a working group of international student representatives from across Australia, convened at an international students' forum hosted in Melbourne in 2009. The 2010 Forum was hosted at the University of Tasmania and coincided with the Education Conference of the National Union of Students. Around 80 international student representatives attended, from all states and all levels of post-secondary education.

By 2022, most student associations had ceased affiliation to CISA citing dissatisfaction over poor governance of the organisation, resulting in the NSW Government issuing an ultimatum and consequently ceased funding CISA. In response, the International Students Representative Council of Australia was established in 2025 to function as the new peak representative body for international students in Australia.
