= Woroni =

Student newspaper of the Australian National University

- Cover of Issue 2 of 2005
- Type: Student publication
- Format: Magazine
- School: Australian National University
- Founded: 1950
- Political alignment: Non-partisan
- Language: English
- Headquarters: Acton, Canberra
- City: Canberra, ACT, Australia
- ISSN: 1326-2793
- Website: woroni.com.au

Woroni is the student newspaper of the Australian National University (ANU), based in Canberra, ACT, Australia. The name "Woroni" derives from an Indigenous Australian word meaning "mouthpiece". Woroni is published bi-monthly in full colour magazine format, and features broad coverage of university and local news, opinion, features, arts and culture, sports, and leisure. It was formerly published as Student Notes: Canberra University College Students Association.

== History ==
Woroni was first published on 23 May 1947 under the title Student Notes: Canberra University College Students Association. From 14 February 1950 the name was changed to Woroni. Traditionally, the editorial tone has been light-hearted and satirical. However, in recent years Woroni has increased its coverage of serious issues such as VSU, "Wadgate", and changes to the ANU School of Humanities. From 1948 to 2010 Woroni was published by ANUSA; its editors were officers of the Association, and responsible to the ANUSA Board of Trustees. In 2010/2011, Woroni became ANU Student Media Inc., a financially and editorially independent student-run publishing house - the first of its kind in Australia.

=== Independence ===
Since its inception in 1947 Woroni was published by Australian National University Students Association, formerly the Canberra University College Students Association, under the portfolio of the general secretary of the association. The editors were officers of the Association, and responsible to the ANUSA Board of Trustees. Throughout its history, Woroni had consistently asserted that it acted independently of the association, however had officially been published by ANUSA, and interference by elected student representatives featured as a concern in light of student union interference in publications elsewhere in Australia.

The successful 2009 'Stand Up!' ticket for election on ANUSA's student representative council, led by 2010 ANUSA President (and 2008 Woroni editor) Tully Fletcher, ran on a platform to deliver an independent student newspaper, similar to student publications at North American universities. ANU Student Media was formed in October of 2010 and formally incorporated as an independent association under the Associations Incorporation Act 1991 (ACT). The first edition of the newspaper printed in 2011 commemorated the incorporation with the front page headline reading "Woroni is No Longer Listed as Married: After 62 years, the ANU Students' Association and Woroni call it quits."

== Editorial board ==
As of 2011, the Woroni editorial board is composed of eight editors, elected in alternating groups of four to terms of 12 months. Elections employ optional preferential voting, and are conducted online at the ANU website. Any ANU student who has submitted three substantive contributions to Woroni is eligible to run for editor. The editor-in-chief serves for a period of six months and is appointed to the position by the editorial board. Only current serving members of the editorial board are eligible to be appointed to the position.

== Related projects ==
Each year, the editors of Woroni also oversee several other related departments and projects.

=== Woroni Radio ===
Woroni Radio is ANU Student Media's student radio station broadcast online through the Woroni website. Founded in 2012, Woroni Radio comprises student presenters creating their own radio content, and features a number of shows, flagship programs and podcasts. Each semester the schedule comprises between 40-60 shows.

=== Woroni TV ===
Woroni TV was conceived in 2016 and launched in 2017. It includes all video and moving content created and produced by Woroni. Content produced crosses genres, featuring a compilation satirical and creative pieces, features on Canberra lifestyle and personalities as well summaries of recent campus news. In 2018 it presented a three-part satirical webseries, The Deep End, written and produced by ANU Students as part of an expansion of the platform's activities.

== Digitisation ==
This newspaper has been digitised as part of the Australian Newspapers Digitisation Program of the National Library of Australia. As of January 2015, issues dating from 1950 to 2007 are available via Trove. Digital versions of works published since 2011 are uploaded and available in colour on electronic publishing platform issuu.

== See also ==
- List of student newspapers
