= National U (disambiguation) =

National U may refer to:

- National U, was a national student-run tabloid newspaper published by the Australian Union of Students.
- National U, the colloquial term for National University (Philippines).
