= Council of Australian Postgraduate Associations =

- Abbreviation: CAPA
- Predecessor: N/A
- Formation: 1979; 47 years ago
- Headquarters: Level 1, 120 Clarendon St, Southbank, Victoria 3006
- Location: Australia
- Members: 33 affiliated university student organisations representing over 440,000 students
- Main organ: Board of Directors
- Affiliations: Australian Council of Graduate Research; Science and Technology Australia
- Website: https://www.capa.edu.au/

The Council of Australian Postgraduate Associations (CAPA) is the peak representative body for postgraduate students in Australia. CAPA's members are 33 postgraduate associations and the National Aboriginal & Torres Strait Islander Postgraduate Association (NATSIPA). CAPA provides member associations with representation to the Federal government, and peak bodies such as the Australian Research Council and Universities Australia, on issues affecting postgraduate students in Australia. In 2017, Australia had over 400,000 postgraduate students, representing one quarter of all tertiary students in Australia.

Recognising the dual roles of many postgraduate students, CAPA works in collaboration with the National Union of Students where matters impact on all students (such as voluntary student unionism and funding for higher education), and with the National Tertiary Education Union regarding issues of employment in the tertiary education sector, particularly on the casualisation of the academic workforce.

CAPA has an office located at the NTEU National office in Melbourne, Victoria. Its Annual Council Meeting (ACM), where organisational issues and policy directives are decided, is hosted by a different constituent organisation each year.

== History ==
CAPA was founded in 1979 by a coalition of ten postgraduate organisations in order to protest taxation on postgraduate research scholarships. Historically, CAPA has been concerned with lobbying around fees on postgraduate degrees.

In 1998, a separate organisation, the National Indigenous Postgraduate Association (NIPA) was formed within CAPA. This association became the National Indigenous Postgraduate Association Aboriginal Corporation (NIPAAC) in 1999, and was later restructured as the National Aboriginal and Torres Strait Islander Postgraduate Association (NATSIPA) in 2015.

== Structure ==
CAPA consists of elected representatives who sit on the Board and the National Representative Council. Board Directors are elected with terms of 2 years, and are the governing committee under the Association Incorporation Reform Act. Whereas, the National Representative Committee are elected with terms of 1 year and execute CAPA's representative and advocacy functions. Elections are held at the Annual Council Meeting by the membership, which is held in November or December.

== See also ==
- Education in Australia
- Student unionism in Australia
