= National Liaison Committee for International Students in Australia =

Students Union of Australia

The National Liaison Committee for International Students in Australia (NLC) was first formed in 1986 in an attempt to combat the Australian Government's introduction of the full-fee paying international students program. Formerly a member of the National Union of Students (Australia), .

== Organisational history ==
NLC was formed in 1986, in response to the need for a unified body to voice international students' concerns especially over the introduction of the user-pay system for international students tuition fee by the Australian government. NLC was the peak representative body in Australia for all international students. It stood for quality education, equitable welfare and multicultural understanding. Until 2009, it was recognised as the national representative body for international students by the Australia Federal Government. In 2009 the leadership of the NLC was expelled from the NUS. This in turn caused the NLC to lose recognition from peak education bodies (Universities Australia, ACPET, TAFE Directors Australia, and English Australia), Federal and State Governments and education providers.

NLC was officially incorporated in 1998 and its official legal name is National Liaison Committee for International Students in Australia Inc. Until 2009 the NLC worked in conjunction with National Union of Students of Australia and fulfilled its role as a peak representative organisation by taking the role of the International Students Committee of the National Union of Students of Australia (NUS).

The NLC had developed strong relationships with many stakeholders in the international education industry. These included, Australian Education International (AEI), IDP Education Australia, State Government Education Departments, International Student Adviser Network Australia (ISANA), all four OSHC providers, National Tertiary Education Union, Australian Vice-Chancellors' Committee, IELTS, English Australia, and most international education departments throughout Australian Universities. Since 2009 many of these relationships have been fundamentally compromised.

The NLC had helped to achieve changes in the international education industry over between 1986 and 2009. These included the deregulation of the overseas student health cover industry, contributions to the ESOS Act reviews in 2006, 2000, 2004 and in 1996, changes to immigration regulations, such as extensions of sunset clauses on permanent residency changes. In 2008 the NLC was currently working on re introducing public transport concession for international students in NSW and Victoria and ensuring quality education.

The NLC had 42 affiliated university campus international student organisations, from 31 public and 2 private universities, and drew its membership primarily from university students, claiming a representation of 303,000 international students in Australia. It contributed to Federal and State Government inquiries and processes into changing and improving international education in Australia.

However, as of 2013, New South Wales Premier along with New South Wales Police Department, 11 universities and NSW Museum issues a warning regards NLC and its OSA activities. They have been accused of collecting personal data from student which is considered illegal. Their current website have been taken down as a result.

== Stance ==
The NLC has been critical of increasing exploitation of full fee paying international students, describing the current international student issues as having begun in 1986 with the introduction of full fees, and claiming that students are exploited in abusive visa schemes which do not result in real educational benefits. The NLC has also criticised the formation of student ghettos due to the poor integration of international and domestic students in Universities and the lack of welfare support for international students causing the development of in-group peer reliance structures. According to Eric Pang in 2008, then the president of the NLC, many international students had claimed "There's not much international students can learn from Australia in terms of culture, or in terms of English. After all, the standard of English of Australian students is not high anyway."

=== 2009 ===
In 2009 the NLC was accused of bullying, was forcibly disaffiliated from the NUS, and recognition has been refused by the University of New South Wales and the University of Sydney. Later in 2009 other international student groups, the Australian Federation of International Students and the Federation of Indian Students of Australia claimed that the NLC had made legal threats regarding their operation in Victoria.

=== 2013 ===
In 2013, NSW Premier issued warning regards NLC and its sub group OSA, stating that they have been involved taking private data from student illegally. NSW Office of Fair Trading has also launched an investigation about the bogus "SafetyCard" issued by NLC, about the non-existent discount in public services and extra protection from police. As a result, their website, which contain the infringed NSW government logo and NSW Police logo have been taken down.
