= Catalyst (magazine) =

Australian student magazine

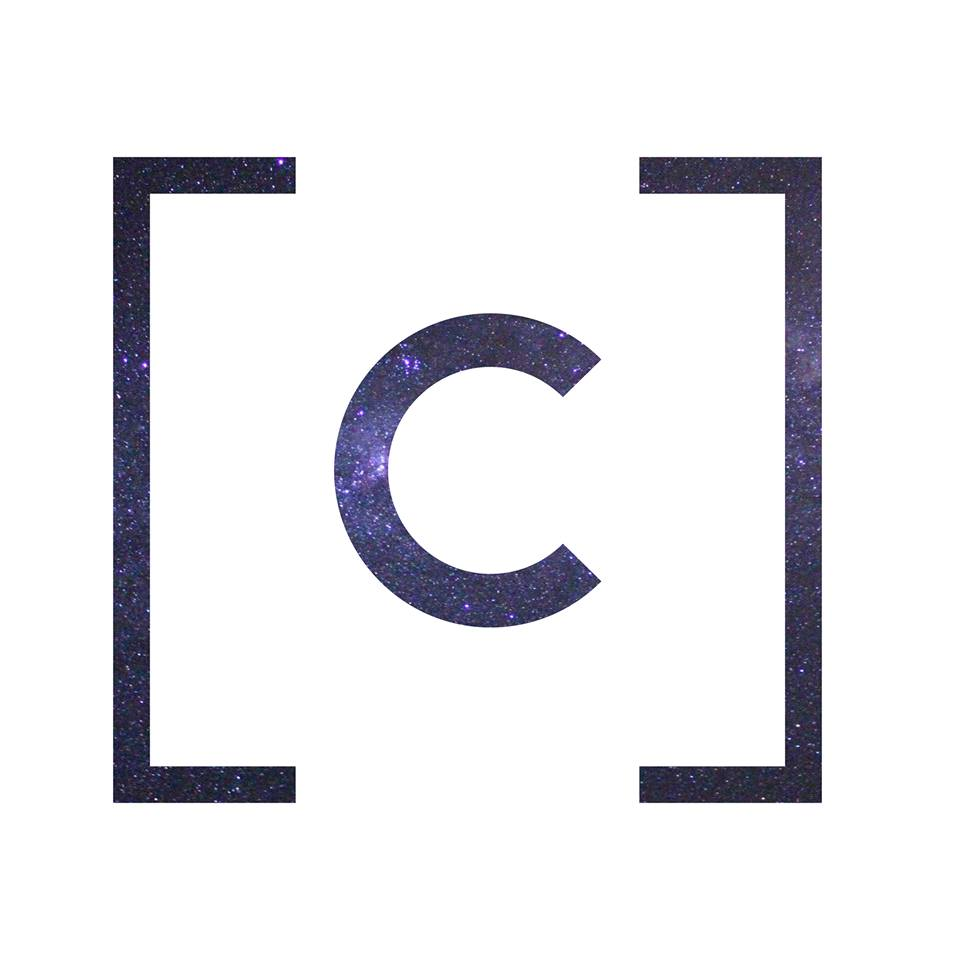

- Catalyst, issue 2 2016, front cover.
- Type: Student publication
- Format: Magazine
- Owner: RMIT University Student Union
- Editor: Mihika Dhule, Charlie Borracci and Olivia Hough
- Founded: 1944
- Language: English
- Website: rmitcatalyst.com

Catalyst is a student magazine published at RMIT University in Melbourne, Australia. The magazine is produced by the RMIT University Student Union.

== History ==
The first edition of Catalyst was published on 18 May 1944 by students at the Melbourne Technical College (later RMIT University).

It was originally titled The Catalyst: College News (later shortened to Catalyst Student News), and envisioned as a newspaper for the Chemistry School (hence the chemical flavour of the title and early articles), but quickly expanded to cover the whole of the Melbourne Technical College.

It has occasionally been published under other titles, mostly parodies of other newspapers (such as The Ear’oled, The Horrid, s’Truth, The Unaustralian and The Rage) or plays on the word Catalyst (such as Cackle'yst, Catalust and Revolution Catalyst).

Special issues have also been produced: Women’s/Womyn's editions (titled Havoc) were published annually from 1984-2006 and Queer editions (titled Mutiny) were published from 2000-2006. Also, one issue per year from 1995-1997 was published collectively with student newspapers of other tertiary institutions in Victoria as VICE: The Victorian Inter Campus Edition.

The number of issues published each year varies across the history of the publication. Currently, Catalyst is published five times a year.

Catalyst had a readership of approximately 58,000 in 2009 - up from 15,000 in 2004.

The implementation of voluntary student unionism in 2006 had a significant impact on the viability of student newspapers across Australia, compulsory student union membership fees having been the major source of income for most. Today, Catalyst's funding is drawn jointly from the university and advertising revenue.

Catalyst benefits from its proximity to the RMIT School of Media and Communication, which runs a highly regarded journalism program. In turn Catalyst alumni are active in the Australian media.

Notable former editors of Catalyst include journalists Dewi Cooke, Dan Harrison (both now with The Age), Patricia Karvelas and Elizabeth Gallagher.

== Cataclysm podcast ==
In 2014 Catalyst established its podcast Cataclysm (released tri-weekly) with each episode centring around a theme. Previous podcast themes have included animals, the body and secrets. Each episode of Cataclysm also includes a series of regular segments alongside the themed feature stories.

Mid-2015 saw one of Cataclysm's popular segments "Politics on the Couch" spawn a webseries collaboration between Catalyst and RMITV entitled "Politics at the Belleville". The program was hosted by the same talent as the podcast segment and was released every Friday afternoon.

== Art of Shoplifting controversy ==
In 1995, Catalyst reprinted a controversial article from Rabelais Student Media, its La Trobe University counterpart, entitled The Art of Shoplifting – one of seven student newspapers to do so. Although the Rabelais editors responsible for the original article were prosecuted for ignoring the ban on its publication issued by the state's Chief Censor; the editors of the other seven newspapers were not targeted by the authorities. Charges against the Rabelais editors were later dropped.

== Digitisation ==
In 2020, a combined project was undertaken by RMIT University Library and RMIT University Student Union to digitise the back issues of Catalyst. As of October 2020, over 800 issues had been uploaded into the Library's digital collections. At present, the earliest issues are ‘open access’ while the later issues (those less than 50 years old) are restricted to RMIT University staff, students and alumni. Over time, this embargo will diminish as more issues move into the ‘open access’ category. The most recent issues are also available on the electronic publishing platform Issuu.
