= University of South Australia Student Association =

The University of South Australia Student Association (USASA)
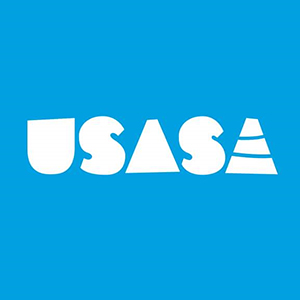
- USASA logo

History
- Founded: 1991; 35 years ago

Leadership
- President: Oliver Shephard-Bayly

Structure
- Seats: 14
- Length of term: 1 year

Website
- usasa.sa.edu.au

Constitution
- usasa.sa.edu.au/resources/0/Constitution/

University of South Australia Student Association
- Location: Adelaide, Australia
- Affiliations: University of South Australia National Union of Students (Australia)
- Employees: 15+

The University of South Australia Student Association (USASA), provides democratic student representation and services including advocacy, student clubs, second-hand books, social events, and a student magazine to the students of the University of South Australia (UniSA). USASA is spread across the University of South Australia's four metropolitan campuses as well as the Centre for Regional Engagement, encompassing the Whyalla and Mount Gambier campuses.

== History ==
On January 1, 1991, the University of South Australia was established as a result of a merger between the Institute of Technology and significant elements of the South Australian College of Advanced Education. The merger required the establishment of a single student association to represent the needs of the six campuses of the newly formed university. The New University Merger Discussion Group initiated the formation of the UniSA Students Association (USASA) in 1994. The intervening years were managed by the Confederated Student Union, the South Australian Institute of Technology Union, and the Council of South Australian College Student Organizations.

When the Howard Government introduced Voluntary Student Unionism (VSU) in 2006, USASA had to restructure to cope with loss of income. Part of this restructure included rebranding the University of South Australia's student association as 'UniLife'.

In 2013, a referendum of students overwhelmingly voted to officially rebrand the organisation as the 'University of South Australia Student Association'. This marked a time of restructure and renewed focus on student representation.

== Structure ==
USASA is a democratic organisation run by students that is responsive to student needs. USASA provides opportunities for students to become involved in the decision-making process at the central level and their local campus level through branch committees. USASA has established a number of standing committees that deal with specific areas of student concern. These standing committees include the Education Standing Committee, the Equity and Welfare Standing Committee, and the Services Standing Committee.

=== USASA Board ===
The overarching policies of the student association are set by the USASA Board. This is composed of students elected by and from the student population. The composition of the USASA Board and its powers and responsibilities are set out in the USASA Constitution.

=== Staff ===
USASA employs over 15 permanent, temporary and casual staff. Representation and student service delivery provided by USASA is coordinated from the City West Campus head office and assisted by campus counters on each metropolitan campus. USASA employees perform a range of roles and either directly provide student services or support student representatives and club organisers to carry out their roles.

== Student Media ==
=== Verse Magazine ===
Verse Magazine is a student-run magazine, published six times a year and distributed around UniSA campuses. The magazine content is entirely student created featuring articles, stories, poems, illustration, photographs submitted to the student editors. Regular features include interviews with graduates, Vox Pop, feature of a UniSA art student's work, and movie and music reviews. The magazine maintains a website which features content from the magazine and also online exclusive articles. In 2017, Verse Magazine won the 'Best Student Publication' award at Tertiary Access Group's CampusLink Awards in Canberra.

=== UniLife Magazine ===
The UniLife Magazine was a student-run magazine published eight times a year and distributed at all UniSA campuses. UniLife Magazine covered the latest student-relevant events, photos, interviews, reviews and stories. Any UniSA student could contribute to the UniLife Magazine. The publication was run by a team of editors working out of the UniLife Magazine office at UniSA Magill Campus. At the beginning of 2014 Unilife Magazine became USASA magazine to coincide with the re-branding of the organisation. USASA magazine existed under this name until a review of the magazine mid-2014 saw the magazine re-branded, refreshed and relaunched as Verse Magazine.

=== Entropy Magazine ===
Entropy Magazine was a spin-off project started by the UniSA student association to promote youth culture in 1992. The design-driven magazine proved to be an effective means of discovering new creative talent within the fields of design, art, illustration, photography and writing.

In 2004, Entropy beat 26 other student magazines from Australia and New Zealand to win the ACUMA "Best Student Magazine Award".

The Greenpeace Design Awards was a poster design award in 2009, presented by Greenpeace Australia Pacific and UniLife Inc, in association with the University of South Australia. The aim of the competition was to motivate creative communities around the world to create artwork that encourages the public to take action on environmental issues and support Greenpeace. This need for a call to action message was stimulated through the poster brief "Be Part of the Action". The Greenpeace Design Awards proved an international success, garnering 1500 entries from 77 different countries. Melbourne designer Sam Dickson won the inaugural competition, with Denis Popenkov from Russia and Spencer Harrison taking second and third place respectively.

March 2009 signalled the rebranding of Entropy Magazine as UniLife Magazine to ensure that the student publication more greatly represented UniSA student interests.
