= Metior =

METIOR
- Type: Student newspaper
- Format: Magazine
- Owner: Murdoch University Guild of Students
- Editor: Sonia Kohlbacher and Duncan Wright
- Founded: 1975
- Language: English
- Circulation: 2500

Metior Magazine or METIOR is a student publication of Murdoch University in Perth, Western Australia. Metior is funded by the Murdoch University Guild of Students but remains independent. The name is an acronym for "Murdoch Empire Telegram Indian Ocean Review".

Metior was founded in 1975, the same year Murdoch University was officially established. Metior was a hard-copy student publication and went through many iterations, edits and formats throughout its time on campus. In 2015, due to a significant drop in readership and the undeniable influence of the internet, Metior made the switch to online only. Using the Wordpress content management platform, it can be found at www.metior.com.au.

The magazine, in conjunction with the Murdoch Guild, plans to print one hard-copy edition at the beginning of every academic year but this is dependent on financial factors.

Metior describes itself as a "student owned, student run, student targeted publication of Murdoch University".

Topics Metior covers include student politics, arts, culture and music, although editorial focus shifts from editor to editor. It features images from student photographers at the university.

Metior ceased online production in 2021, however returned as a blog for student on the Murdoch Students Guild website in 2023.

== History ==
=== Art of Shoplifting controversy ===
In 1995, Metior was one of seven student newspapers that reprinted a controversial article from Rabelais Student Media, its La Trobe University counterpart, entitled "The Art of Shoplifting". Although the Rabelais editors responsible for the original article were prosecuted for ignoring a ban on publication issued by the state's Chief Censor, the editors of the other seven newspapers were not targeted by the authorities. Charges against the Rabelais editors were later dropped.

=== Voluntary student unionism ===
Although the implementation of voluntary student unionism in 2006 had a significant impact on the viability of student newspapers across Australia given that compulsory student union membership fees had been the major source of income for most, Metior was not affected.
