= La Trobe Student Union =

Peak representative body for students at La Trobe University

La Trobe Student Union (LTSU)
- La Trobe Student Union Inc.
- LTSU
- Founded: 1967 (as Student Representative Council); 1971 (as Student Union); 2011 (merged into current form)
- Merger of: La Trobe University Student's Guild, Student Representative Council, Postgraduate Association
- Headquarters: Upper Agora East, La Trobe University, Bundoora
- Location: Australia
- President: Parth Jadav
- Affiliations: La Trobe University, NUS
- Website: http://latrobesu.org.au/

The La Trobe Student Union (LTSU) is a representative body for students at La Trobe University. The LTSU is located at the Bundoora campus. It is made up of elected student representatives who provide advocacy, services, events and support for La Trobe Students, also operating the Rabelais student newspaper. The Union also runs a food bank on the Bundoora campus.

The Student Representative Council was formed in July 1967, and the larger La Trobe Student Union being formed being formed in 1971. The LTSU was split into three bodies in 2006 with the introduction of voluntary student unionism and the consequent loss of funding, being the Student Guild, the Student Representative Council and the Postgraduate Association. In 2011, with the introduction of the Student Services and Amenities fee by the Gillard government, the LTSU was remerged into one body, with incorporation of the Mature Aged Student Organisation (formerly the Part Time, Evening Mature Student Organisation) and International Student Association as associated bodies.

== History ==
During the 1960s and 1970s, La Trobe, along with Monash, was considered to have the most politically active student body of any university in Australia. The Communist Party of Australia (Marxist-Leninist) was a prominent organisation on campus, often with the cover of a front organisation sometimes encouraging the name 'La Trot'. The following La Trobe alumni were all good friends at the time and took part in student politics: Bill Kelty from the ACTU and AFL Commissioner, former Treasurer Tony Sheehan, Don Watson, Geoff Walsh (Bob Hawke's press secretary, High-profile union officials Brian Boyd, John Cummins and Garry Weaven, former federal treasury official and former Westpac CEO, David Morgan. Some other Labor figures and people from the left side of politics include Mary Delahunty, Phil Cleary and Michael Danby. Despite the general socialist/leftist atmosphere several conservative corporate/business figures and Liberal party members have come from La Trobe, including Victorian Liberal Party Leader Matthew Guy who, in March 2018, apologised for a homophobic letter he signed in 1994, which resurfaced ahead of the State election.

The La Trobe University Students' Union is responsible for many Contact Student Services but its role has been considerably diminished as a consequence of Voluntary Student Unionism, introduced in 2006. There were previously three main student representative bodies on campus known as the La Trobe University Student Guild, The Student's Representative Council and the La Trobe Postgraduate Student's Association. The SRC became the principal representative body on campus. In 2011, the SRC, Postgraduate Students Association, Students Guild and the university remerged the three separate organisations back into one body: The La Trobe Student Union.

== Controversy ==
=== SRC election postal vote scandal ===
During the 1995 SRC election, there was a major scandal involving postal ballots sent to Glenn College. A group of four candidates associated with the Australian Labor Party, Stephen Donnelly, Robert Larocca, Nigel Rhode and Robin Scott, contested the election. Shortly before the close of the polls, a bag containing postal votes sent to Glenn College, a residential college of the University, was hand delivered by Scott to the Deputy Returning Officer, the Returning Officer having been admitted to hospital. This was contrary to the normal procedure of ballots being delivered to the Returns office via the internal mail system. Scott was advised the ballots may be declared invalid due to the possibility of interference. The DRO's final report discovered numerous irregularities, including:

- Postal Votes were delivered by hand to students of Glenn College by the candidates.
- Some students whose ballot papers had been received had not seen them, or only some of them out of three delivered.
- Ballot papers were filled in and folded in the same manner, with similar handwriting patterns being observed.

The four candidates subsequently withdrew their nominations, and the ballots were declared invalid. The candidates were charged with Dishonest Conduct and Interfering with Ballot Papers by the Returning Officer, but the electoral regulations did not allow the Returning Officer to enforce the charges, with the Dean of Glenn College and the University Secretary deciding not to investigate the matter or discipline the students. The report noted their "extraordinary" disinterest.

Some of those involved with the scandal were later prominent figures of the Victorian Labor Party, with Robin Scott serving as the member for Preston from 2006 to 2022, and Stephen Donnelly becoming Assistant State Secretary.

== Current Representatives ==
President	Amelia Sevior
General Secretary	
Education Vice President	Maali Kerta-Rice
Postgraduate Officer	Rushi
Welfare Vice President	Maeve Russack
Education Public Affairs Officer	Lucas Brunning-Halsall
Social Justice Officer	Alicia Griffiths
Disabilities Officer	Ellysia Coutts-Hawking
Welfare Officer	Jedd Brockhouse
First Nations Officer	Ella Cutts
Women's Officer	Harleen Mahal
Queer Officer	Maali Kerta-Rice
Queer Officer	Tharun Balasubramanian
People of Colour Officer	Niharika Malviya
Activities Officer	Bharath Ganesh Bharamagoudar
Residential Officer	Tanvir Singh
Rabelais Editor	Kawdar El-Safatli
Rabelais Editor	Finley McFarlane
