= Swinburne Student Union =

History
- Founded: 1983; 43 years ago (incorporated)

Leadership
- President: Kishaun Aloysius

Structure
- Length of term: 1 year
- Affiliations: National Union of Students
- Student Magazine: The Swine

Meeting place
- Swinburne University of Technology

Website
- www.ssu.org.au

Swinburne Student Union (SSU), was the independent student representative body of Swinburne University of Technology in Melbourne, Australia. Membership is opt-in for all Swinburne students. Swinburne Student Union were campaigning for a return of student control of student affairs. The Swinburne Student Union was Swinburne’s only independent, student-run; representation, welfare and events service.

== History ==
2005-2009: VSU Union Collapse

Due to the advent of voluntary student unionism (VSU), Swinburne created a subsidiary organisation known as the Swinburne Student Amenities Association, or SSAA, in 2006, which superseded many of the roles formerly operated by the union. In this time period, the SSU focused their energy on political activism. Prior to 2005 the SSU published an independent student newspaper called Tabula Rasa, this publication ceased production due to lack of funding in 2005.

In December 2005, the University declined to renew the Student Union's lease on catering outlets and outsourced catering operations to private operators. In March 2006, the union was the subject of controversy after the Vice-Chancellor, Prof. Ian Young, announced that the university would not renew the Union's funding for 2006 - an expected payment of A$1.5 million. Media reports speculated on the collapse of the organisation as a result. The organisation was under considerable financial pressure, and was forced to reduce staff numbers considerably in order to remain solvent. In 2006, SSU terminated the employment of its executive officer, Balrama Krishnan for alleged gross and willful misconduct. He was the Union's most senior employee, having worked there for over 26 years. The Swinburne Student Union has implemented a range of strategies designed to ensure its survival despite VSU. They began rolling out financial membership packages from 1 July 2006. In 2009, SSU's offices in the Union building at Swinburne's Hawthorn campus were occupied by the SSAA, and the Union moved their offices to the Administration building. This left the unique situation of the Union building, built in the 80's solely to house SSU activities, having no Union presence.

2009 - 2011

The situation at Swinburne remained largely unchanged although in early 2009 it was hinted by the university they would be willing to give back some control of advocacy to the Union if the organisation was prepared to negotiate. The situation did not change until a council meeting on 1 September 2010 a motion was successfully passed to freeze the wage of all office bearers. At the 2010 Swinburne Student Union Annual elections Socialist Alternative running under the banner of Student Voice lost all positions (with the exception of National Union of Students Delegates) to an Australian Greens/Labor/Independent Coalition running under the banner of Shake Up. This is a unique result as it is the first time candidates from any significant political parties have had significant inroads into the Swinburne Student Union. The Shake Up team ran under student service/advocacy/activity based policies rather than the left wing and broad non-student issue focus of Student Voice. In 2011 Swinburne Student Union is enjoyed a resurgence in interest and membership, with over 700 members joining in the first half of 2011. The Union successfully campaigned to return to the Union building in 2011, although only to one floor. The SSU also greatly expanded its services by offering its members free printing, free breakfast, parties and events as well as representation and advice by students, for students.

2012

In 2012, there are over 1000 members involved with the SSU. Services have grown to include free meal days, more social functions and a student magazine, as well as continuing all the services that were introduced in 2011.

2022-2024

In 2022, the SSU leadership, students representatives from SSAA (trading as Swinburne Student Life) and the DVC-EEE office came together to discuss and finalise a co-creation model that placed student voice at the heart of decision making for campus culture and vibrancy post-COVID. The discussions recognised the duplication of events, offerings and programs that were produced by both SSU and SSL that led to unnecessary competition and confusion amongst students. After multiple town halls, surveys, citizens assemblies and workshops, it was decided that a referendum was to be held to put forward the following question to Swinburne University students: Should we keep the status quo; OR should there be a single, unified student body representing students? The results were overwhelming in favour of a single entity. As a result of the referendum, both SSU and SSL agreed to dissolve and merge into a single unified entity called the Swinburne Student Association (SSA) that officially kickstarted in 2025 - with full support from the DVC-EEE and Swinburne's University Council.

== Campaigns ==
WTF (Where’s the Funding)

The WTF campaign is running in response to the introduction of the Student Services and Amenities Fee (or, SSAF) introduced at the beginning of 2012. The Union’s main issues with the SSAF were that Swinburne chose to implement it before many other universities, yet did so without planning or consulting the students as to what the fees would be spent on. There was also concern that students who didn’t pay the fee were being locked out of their ‘my.swinburne’ online portal accounts.

This campaign was re-launched in 2016 after the University took in an additional $1.5 million in SSAF but neither The SSU or SSAA saw more than a CPI increase in funding. The campaign focused on transparency and holding the University accountable.

Keep our Campuses Alive

On 6 July 2012, Swinburne Vice-Chancellor, Prof. Linda Kristjanson announced the closure of Swinburne’s Lilydale and Prahran Campuses. No students were consulted before this announcement, some finding out through the media first. With Lilydale closing within the year and Prahran’s design courses being moved to the Hawthorn campus, there were concerns for the impact of this disruption upon students.

== Presidents ==
Year	President
2024	Kishaun Aloysius
2023	Kishaun Aloysius
2022	Nidzam Shah Hussain
2021	James Atkins
2020	Param Mahal
2019	Sam Roberts

== The Swine ==
In 2012, the Union launched The Swine, the first independent student publication at Swinburne since Tabula Rasa. The Swine is run by the Swinburne Student Union Media Committee with assistance from independent Journalism and Design students.

== Operations ==
Elections

The Swinburne Student Union holds annual elections for office bearer positions. It has several standing committees including the Education Board, Secretariat, Services Management Board, SISA and SUPA; the latter two being constitutionally established representative bodies to serve the needs of international students and postgraduates respectively.
