= RMIT University Library =

Academic library network

Coordinates: 37°48′31″S 144°57′50″E

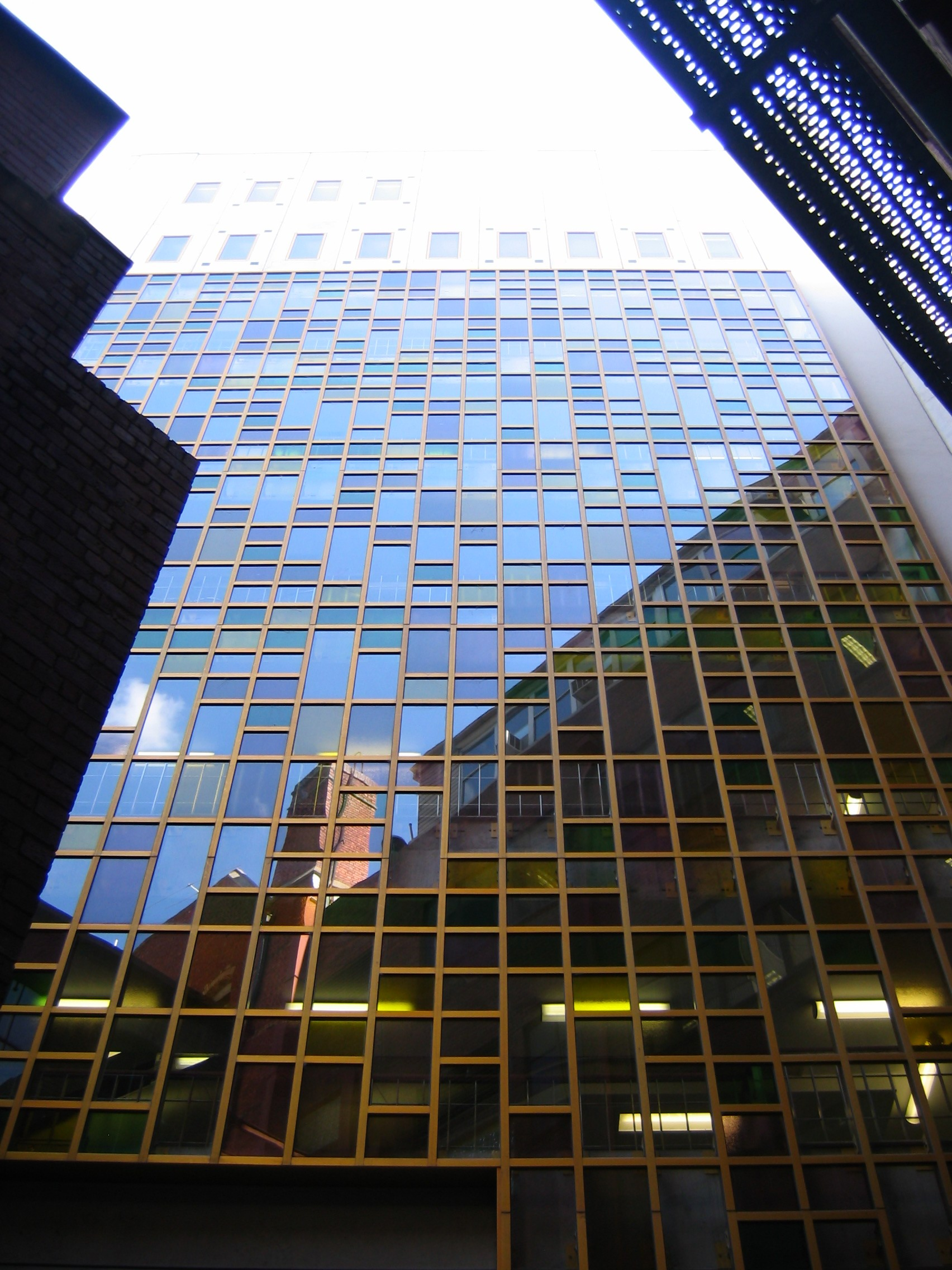
- Swanston Library at RMIT's City campus
- Location: Various locations, Melbourne, Victoria, Australia
- Established: 1890 (as the library of the former Working Men's College)
- Branches: 6 (the largest being the Swanston Library)

Collection
- Size: Swanston Library: 400,000+ volumes (approx)

Access and use
- Population served: 90,000

Other information
- Director: David Howard
- Employees: 120
- Website: RMIT Library; RMIT Vietnam Library

RMIT University Library (previously known as 'Libraries of the Royal Melbourne Institute of Technology') consists of six academic branch libraries in Australia and Vietnam. Its four Australian branches are located on the RMIT University campuses in Melbourne City, Bundoora and Brunswick; and its two Vietnamese branches are located at the RMIT University Vietnam campuses in Ho Chi Minh City and Hanoi.

== History ==
The antecedent to RMIT's University Library network was established as the library of the Working Men's College of Melbourne (antecedent to present-day RMIT) in 1890. The tiny library was initially housed in a 6 x 9 m room in Building 1 and contained only 152 m of shelf space. It was managed by the college's mathematics instructor Alfred Hart between 1902 and 1930, a leading Shakespearian of his day.

From the 1930s, the library was expanded and relocated to the space beneath the public lecture theatre of Building 1 (what is today the Pearson and Murphy's café). During this time, it was primarily staffed by repatriated World War I soldiers as part of a federal government re-skilling program. By 1945, the library had outgrown its space and the decision was made to split it into specific field collections. From then the various collections were housed in the schools relevant to each field.

In 1955, a central library was re-established in Building 6 - following ongoing requests from the student union. And, in 1956, John Livingstone Ward was appointed as RMIT's first chief librarian. Some schools continued to maintain research collections, in addition to the central library. Examples of school collections that still exist are the AFI Research Collection, RMIT Design Archives and National Aerospace Resource.

As the campus expanded northward during the 1970s, a second library site was opened. In 1993, the main library was relocated to Building 8 and was further expanded - after which it was known as the Swanston Library. The second library became known as the Carlton Library.

Two more libraries were added to the network when the Bundoora campus opened in 1995 - Bundoora East Library and Bundoora West Library. When the Brunswick campus was annexed by RMIT in 1999, the Brunswick Library also became part of the network.

During the 1990s and 2000s, a Business Library was located in Building 108 on Bourke Street. The collection was merged with the Swanston Library when RMIT closed the building in 2012.

The branches at the Ho Chi Minh City, known as Beanland Library, and Hanoi campuses opened in 2001 and 2004 respectively.

In November 2018, the Bundoora East Campus Library closed and merged with Bundoora West Library.

== Branches ==
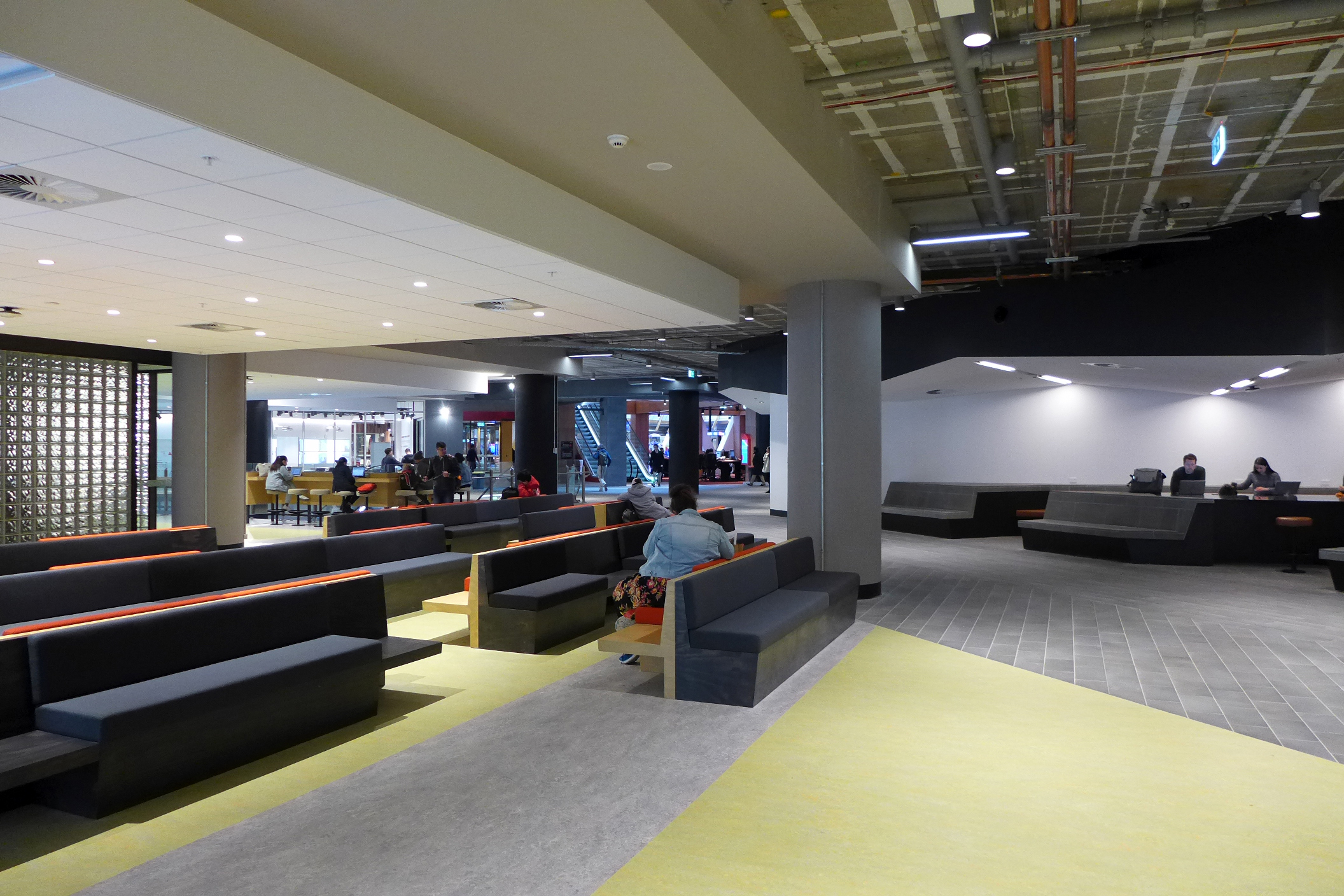
Swanston Library after renovation in 2017

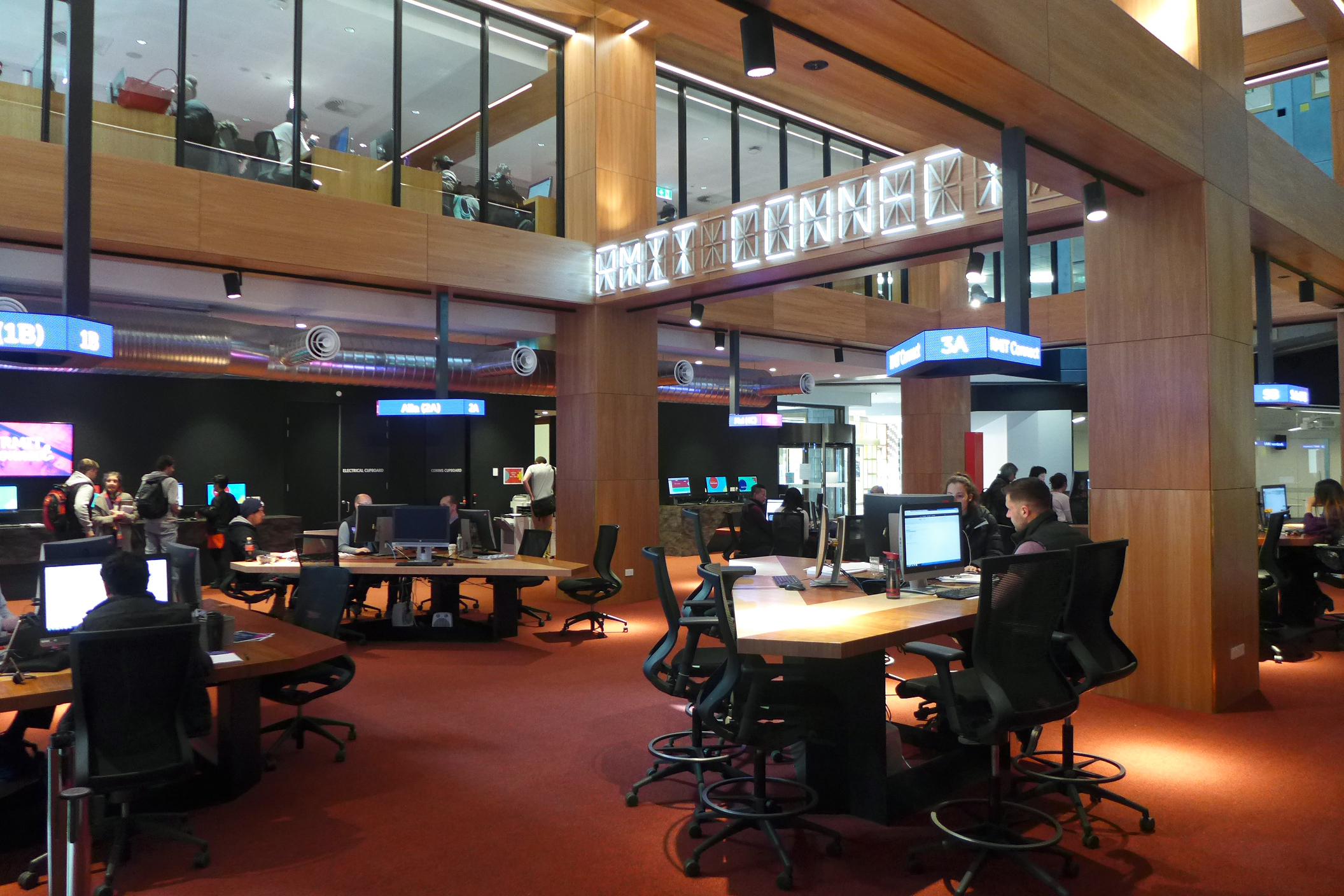
RMIT Connect

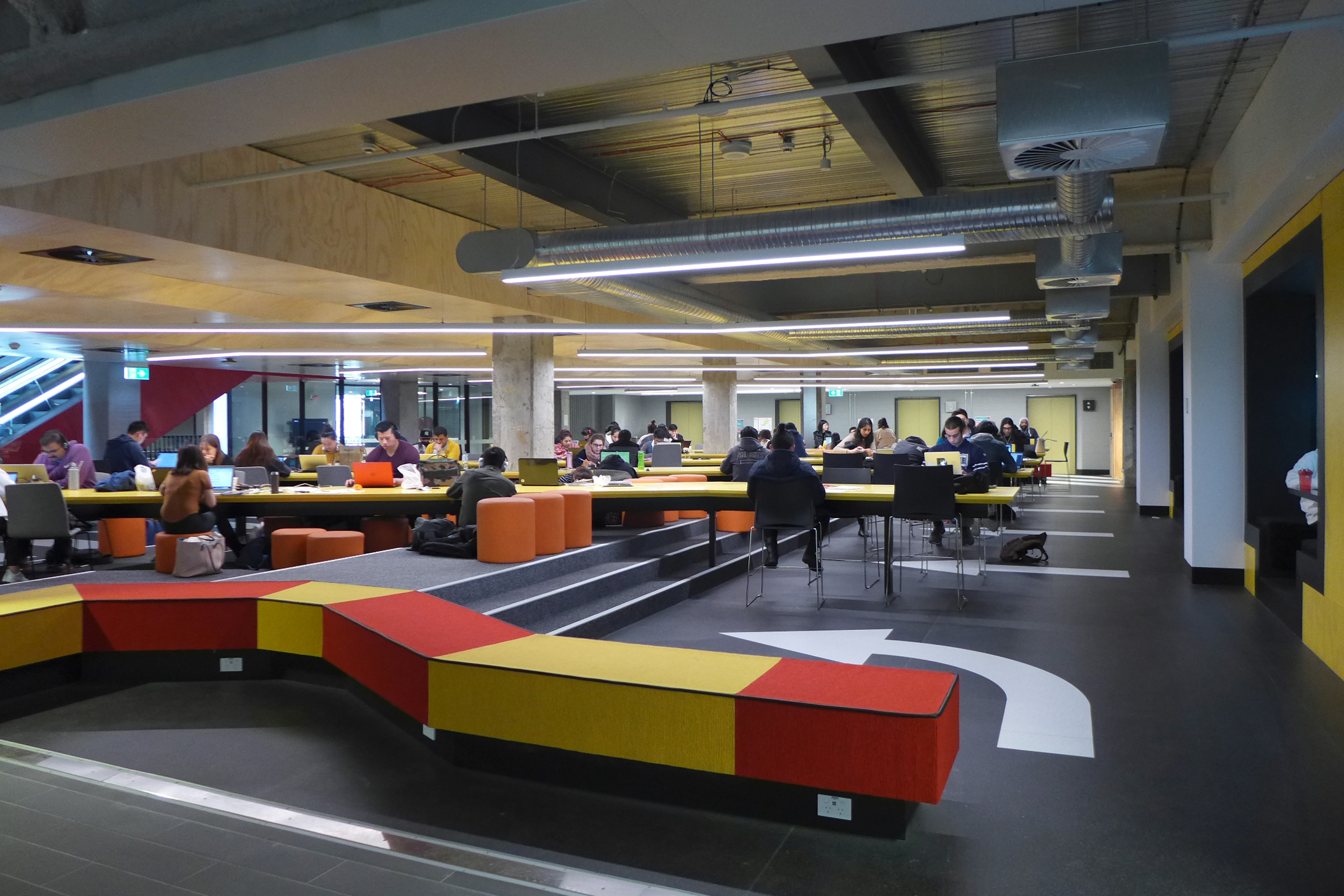
Swanston Library study area

=== Melbourne City campus ===
The City campus has two sites: Swanston Library and Carlton Library.

Swanston Library
The Swanston Library is the largest site in the network, and is located in Building 8.

It is unique from the other campus libraries in that it is the only RMIT Library site open until midnight during part of the semester.

Swanston Library was named as one of "Five of the best libraries" in The Age Sunday M magazine. The reasons included... "Like the sprawling campus itself, [Swanston Library] has nooks and crannies and, best of all, dedicated silent places".

=== RMIT Library Makerspace ===
The RMIT Makerspace provides free access to 3D printers, laser cutters, CNC routers and other equipment to students, staff and alumni of RMIT University and is located in Building 14.

=== Bundoora campus ===
The Bundoora campus has one library site: Bundoora West Library. Bundoora East Library closed in November, 2018.

=== Brunswick campus ===
The Brunswick campus has one Library site.

=== Vietnamese campuses ===
Two libraries are located at RMIT's Vietnam campuses; Beanland Library and Hanoi Library. The Beanland Library is the largest of the two libraries, and is located at the Ho Chi Minh City campus.

== Services ==
For users with disabilities, services are available to assist with using the collections. At Brunswick, Bundoora, Carlton, and Swanston libraries, contact library staff. For all other matters, contact the Library Disability Services Co-ordinator.

== See also ==
- RMIT
- Working Men's College of Melbourne
