= RMIT University Student Union =

Australian student body

- RUSU logo

History
- Founded: 1944; 82 years ago

Leadership
- President: Samuel Coombs
- General Secretary: Bunny Wadhwa

Structure
- Seats: 28
- Length of term: 1 year
- Affiliations: National Union of Students

Meeting place
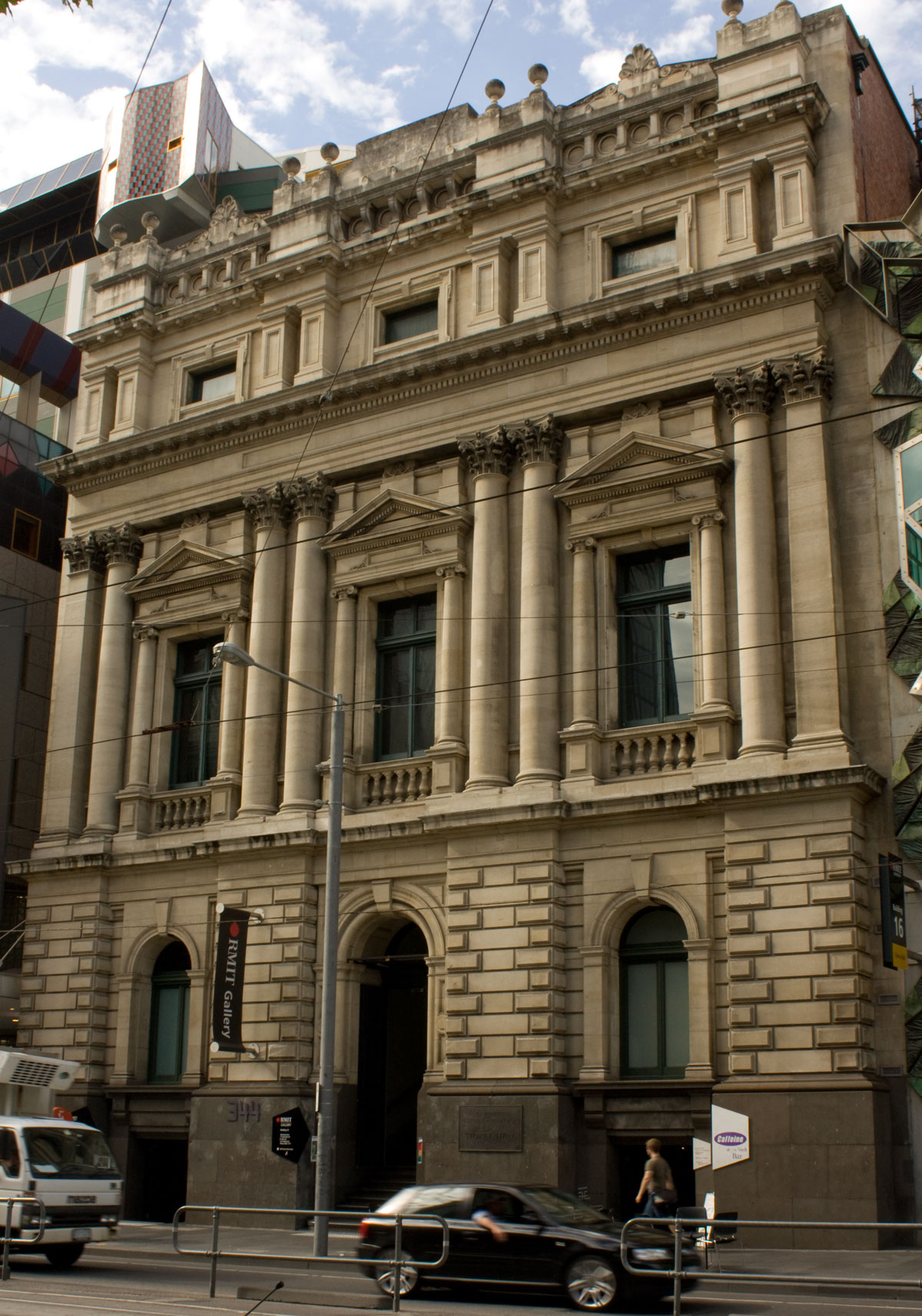
- Storey Hall and Building 57, Level 4, RMIT University, 115 Queensberry Street, Carlton 3053

Website
- rusu.rmit.edu.au

Constitution
- RUSU Constitution

Rules
- RUSU Regulations and Policy

The RMIT University Student Union (RUSU), is the peak representative body for students enrolled at the Royal Melbourne Institute of Technology (RMIT). The Student Union is independent of the university and operates under the direction of annually elected student representatives. According to the constitution, all students are automatic members of the Student Union but may choose to become a financial member.

The Student Union offers a range of services, including student rights advocacy, campus activities and events, funding student media including RMITV & Catalyst as well as hosting Women's, and Queer student lounges. RUSU is also responsible for funding and supporting over 100 clubs & societies that are either Academic, Cultural, Political, Social or Spiritual based. RMIT Student Life, which is run by the university (not the Student Union) funds and manages all Arts and Sports clubs. RUSU has offices at the three major Melbourne campuses and sites of RMIT University. RUSU is an affiliated body to the National Union of Students.

== History ==
John Storey Junior helped found the Student Representative Council in 1944, acted as its first President, and lobbied for the establishment of a central library. His studies were cut short when he was diagnosed with leukemia and died in 1947, aged just 22. His recognition of service to the RMIT community lives on with one RMIT's most striking buildings – Storey Hall – in tribute to John Storey Junior and his father Sir John. Over the years since its founding, the student union has continued to grow and expand into more areas to become an integral part of the student experience on campus.

In 2006, with the introduction of voluntary student unionism (VSU) legislation, the Student Union underwent a major reorganisation. Most of the staff were made redundant, the organisation's three separate campus councils were merged, and several services such as the second-hand bookshop were abandoned. While the organisation suffered a drastic funding cut (from $3.9 million AUD to $1.3 million AUD) as a result of VSU, it managed to survive the cutbacks and continue providing services, advocacy and representation to students.

In 2010, the RMIT University Student Union adopted the acronym and rebranding of RUSU. The student union had become formally incorporated in 2021, leading it to achieve a non-for-profit status.

== Current structure ==
As of 2024, the Student Union Council has 28 voting members, who are elected by RMIT students at annual held elections. Each Melbourne campus of RMIT (Brunswick, Bundoora and City) has a campus coordinator and a general campus representative as part of the 28 voting member structure.

Councillors are typically elected in the second week of September and hold November to October terms. Ex-officio (non-voting) members may be appointed to the Student Union Council at its discretion. All members of the Student Union Council must be financial members of the Student Union.

The Student Union Council meets regularly, and it is also responsible for electing the President and Communications Officer, as outlined in the Student Union Constitution. A smaller group of student office bearers, known as the Secretariat, meets more regularly to discuss day-to-day operational, staffing, and other urgent matters.

In addition to having student representatives as board directors of the organisation, the Student Union employs professional staff to help deliver key programs and services, and assist in governance. All staff members are supervised by an elected student representative as determined by the Secretariat.

== Leadership ==
Presidents of the RMIT University Student Union
No.	Portrait	Name	Term	Election year	General Secretary
53		Peter Barker	1 November 1996 – 31 October 1997	1996	Andrea Maksimovic
54		Andrea Maksimovic	1 November 1997 – 31 October 1998	1997	Mandi Scott
55		Mandi Scott	1 November 1998 – 31 October 1999	1998	Lizzie Minchin
56		Jess Latimer	1 November 1999 – 31 October 2000	1999	Kristin Godby
57		Jonathan Wilkinson	1 November 2000 – 31 October 2001	2000	Danny Bouvong
58		Emily Anderson	1 November 2001 – 31 October 2002	2001	Ty Capach
59		Emily Anderson	1 November 2002 – 31 October 2003	2002	Kittisak Muckaprom
60		Dinesh Rajalingum	1 November 2003 – 31 October 2004	2003	Duc Hieu Le
61		Sridaran Vijayajumar	1 November 2004 – 31 October 2005	2004	Duc Hieu Le
62		Dan Thomas	1 November 2005 – 31 October 2006	2005	Taylor Wright
63		Patrick O'Keeffe	1 November 2006 – 31 October 2007	2006	Priyanka Erasmus
64		Robert Harding	1 November 2007 – 31 October 2008	2007	Priyanka Erasmus
65		Jessica Hall	1 November 2008 – 31 October 2009	2008	Natasha Ferroff
66		Emma Henderson	1 November 2009 – 31 October 2010	2009	Thomas Ayers
67		David Swan	1 November 2010 – 31 October 2011	2010	Cortney Bruch
68		Hovig Melkonian	1 November 2011 – 31 October 2012	2011	Jian Zhong
69		James Michelmore	1 November 2012 – 31 October 2013	2012	Gabriel Brady
70		James Michelmore	1 November 2013 – 31 October 2014	2013	Ariel Zohar
71		Himasha Fonseka	1 November 2014 – 31 October 2015	2014	Ariel Zohar
72		Ariel Zohar	1 November 2015 – 31 October 2016	2015	Abena Dove
73		Abena Dove	1 November 2016 – 31 October 2017	2016	Emily Hansen
74		Abena Dove	1 November 2017 – 31 October 2018	2017	Ella Gvildys
75		Ella Gvildys	1 November 2018 – 31 October 2019	2018	Aditya Sharma
76		Daniel Hoogstra	1 November 2019 – 31 October 2020	2019	Beatrice Co
77		Akshay Jose	1 November 2020 – 31 October 2021	2020	Jarred Armitage
78		Adam Steiner	1 November 2021 – 31 October 2022	2021	Sheldon Gait
79		Beth Shegog	1 November 2022 – 31 October 2023	2022	Mark Morante
80		Ella Byrne	1 November 2023 – 31 October 2024	2023	Dhweep Shah
81		Finbar Bray	1 November 2024 – 31 October 2025	2024	Dulan Ariyathilaka
82		Samuel Coombs	1 November 2025 – 31 October 2026	2025	Bunny Wadhwa
83		Daiyan Mustansir	1 November 2026 – 31 October 2027	2026	Vishwa Aadhith

== Student Union Council ==
RMIT University Student Union – 83rd Student Union Council (elected 2026)
Position	Name
General Secretary (Chair)	Vishwa Aadhith
Office-bearer	Yash Pandey
Office-bearer	Lucas Read
Office-bearer	Kangnan Ying
Office-bearer	Thansidh Kirthan
Office-bearer	Era Chaudhary
Office-bearer	Baylin Thompson
Office-bearer	Raven Garrett
Office-bearer	Zarah Yakubu
Office-bearer	Maddie Quail
Office-bearer	Rafyat Shafiq
Office-bearer	Ace Tran
Office-bearer	Uday Mandhan
Office-bearer	Abdullah Faisal
Office-bearer	Jhalak Agarwal
Campus Coordinator	Taniya Chandrasekaran
Campus Coordinator	Divyanshi Grover
Campus Coordinator	Ananya Revi
Campus Representative	Angel Mehta
Campus Representative	Saily Kamble
Campus Representative	Aardhra Krishna
Campus Representative	Manas Manish Bhannaria
1st-elected General Representative	Daiyan Mustansir
2nd-elected General Representative	Gemma Seymour
3rd-elected General Representative	Yuvraj Singh Rathore
4th-elected General Representative	Max Parritt
5th-elected General Representative	Nivedita Dharan
1st Alternate General Representative	Uttamjit Kaur
2nd Alternate General Representative	Aditya Kamal Ahom

RMIT University Student Union – 82nd Student Union Council (elected 2025)
Position	Name
General Secretary (Chair)	Bunny Wadhwa
Office-bearer	Shaina Khanna
Office-bearer	Saiansh Sharma
Office-bearer	Feifei Wu
Office-bearer	Ishi Ahmed
Office-bearer	Angela Fenech
Office-bearer	Baylin Thompson
Office-bearer	Maya Szyszko
Office-bearer	Zarah Yakubu
Office-bearer	Lachlan Wills
Office-bearer	Manaal Soomro
Office-bearer	Mandeep Sharma
Office-bearer	Bushra Yamin
Office-bearer	Vishwa Aadith
Office-bearer	Daiyan Mustansir
Campus Coordinator	Snigdha Garg
Campus Coordinator	Mathy Sivakumar
Campus Coordinator	Ace Tran
Campus Representative	Amira Sommariva
Campus Representative	Zoe Avotins
Campus Representative	Felipe Chaparro
Campus Representative	Nasih Moopan
1st-elected General Representative	Samuel Coombs
2nd-elected General Representative	Gemma Seymour
3rd-elected General Representative	Amarli Winter
4th-elected General Representative	Holly Medlyn
5th-elected General Representative	Prem Maniyar
1st Alternate General Representative	Mei Ting Su
2nd Alternate General Representative	Darcy Moloughney

== Student media ==
The RMIT Student Union funds the student-run magazine Catalyst & student television on-campus production studios RMITV. It continues to have strong ties with SYN radio station located within RMIT, however there is no formal or funding relationship between the separate organisations.

Catalyst Magazine was first published in 1944, the same year the Student Union was established. It is one of two official student magazines and news sources on RMIT campus.

RMIT University Student Union – Catalyst Editors (elected 2026)
Position	Name
Catalyst Editor	Vismaya Gejjala
Catalyst Editor	Huda Shehzad
Catalyst Editor	Kanishka Sharma
