= Acuma Incorporated =

Acuma Incorporated (formerly the Australasian Campus Union Managers’ Association) is a representative organisation for senior staff in tertiary campus service organizations in Australia and New Zealand. The purpose of this group is to speak on behalf of its members in areas affecting the tertiary campus service industry. Individual campus service organizations are represented by their General Manager or an equivalent position.

== History ==
Prior to 1992, General Managers and their equivalents in the Australian campus service industry gathered yearly under the banner of the ACUI Region 16 Conference. In 1992, the organisation was incorporated as a not-for-profit body in New South Wales under the Associations Incorporation Act.

== Governance ==
Acuma Incorporated is governed by a Board of Management composed of elected representatives from each of the following regional groups in Australasia:

- Eastern Region - composed of New South Wales, the Australian Capital Territory and New Zealand
- Southern Region - composed of Victoria and Tasmania
- South/Western Region - composed of South Australia and Western Australia and
- Northern Region - composed of Queensland and the Northern Territory

The organisation is managed by an executive officer who is contracted to the organisation, and who acts on the directions of the board as expressed by the elected president.

== Role in Voluntary Student Unionism ==
Acuma Incorporated was active in the debate surrounding the introduction of Voluntary Student Unionism (VSU) legislation in Australia. In conjunction with Australian University Sport, Acuma Incorporated produced a study of the impact of VSU on individual campuses around Australia.
