= Vertigo (magazine) =

UTS Vertigo
- Editor: Bianca Drummond Costa, Mayela Dayeh, Zara Hatton, Jonnie Jock, Liv Litver, Kimia Nojoumian, Eryn Yates, Mannix Williams Thomson
- Categories: Youth, Arts, Society and Culture
- Frequency: Bi-monthly
- Founded: 1991
- Company: UTS Students' Association
- Country: Australia
- Based in: Sydney
- Language: English
- Website: UTS Vertigo

Vertigo is the student magazine of the University of Technology, Sydney. Its name derives from the university's main building, which is a 28-storey brutal modernist tower block, and how the Vertigo Offices were originally at its summit. Vertigo is published by the UTS Students' Association (UTSSA).

== History ==
The name Vertigo was adopted in 1991. Previously the student newspaper had been called Newswit, a leftover from when UTS was the NSW Institute of Technology. It also incorporated the Voice of Kuring-Gai. Newswit was first published on 1 March 1973, with Ross Gittins as editor. An exhibition was held in 2023 to celebrate 50 years of publication.

== Content ==
Each year, the team elected as editors of Vertigo are given creative control of the publication. UTSSA by-laws require at least 50% all content published in Vertigo to be non-fiction, half of which must relate to issues affecting students of UTS. These quotas are enforced by the General Secretary of the UTSSA.

=== Magazine ===
Since 2016 the magazine has been published as six volumes across the calendar year. The magazine is distributed across the Broadway and Haymarket campuses.

Each edition contains an editorial letter and submissions from students and the editorial team. The layout and written content of Vertigo is dictated by the incumbent editorial team. The magazine typically divided into the categories of arts & lifestyle, business, science & innovation, society and culture, creative writing, and a visual showcase. Written submissions are featured alongside artwork, visual design and comics.

=== VertigoTV ===
The 2017 Editors of Vertigo started VertigoTV, a digital video brand managed by one editor and a team of screenwriters, video editors, sound designers, animator, and filmmakers. They produced fashion lookbooks, animated trailers, interviews, campus news, and skits.

=== Office Bearer Reports ===
Vertigo is constitutionally required to print Office Bearer Reports for the UTS Students' Association Office Bearers if they would like to inform the student population about their role and activities. This has often led to controversies as the editorial direction often attracts a readership which may be at political odds with some Office Bearers' beliefs.

== Editors ==
The Vertigo editorial team are annually elected at the end of the preceding year on a ticket of six to 12 by UTS students. Vertigo editorial teams have typically consist of an editorial and design contingent. An editor-in-chief may be elected at the discretion of the editorial team, but is not a fixed role. At the conclusion of their term, the Vertigo editorial team are paid a stipend of $40,000 divided by the number of members who have completed their term, granted no editor receives more than $5,000.

Editors (2025)
| Editor | Year | Ticket |
|---|---|---|
| Bianca Drummond Costa | 2025 | Freefall |
| Mayela Dayeh | 2025 | Freefall |
| Arkie Thomas | 2025 | Freefall |
| Zara Hatton | 2025 | Freefall |
| Olivia Litver | 2025 | Freefall |
| Eryn Yates | 2025 | Freefall |
| Emanie Darwiche | 2025 | Independent |
| Kimia Nojoumian | 2025 | Freefall |
| Mannix Williams-Thomson | 2025 | Freefall |
| Jonnie Jock | 2025 | Freefall |
