= UTS Students' Association =

Representative body for students at University of Technology, Sydney

The University of Technology Sydney Students' Association (UTSSA)
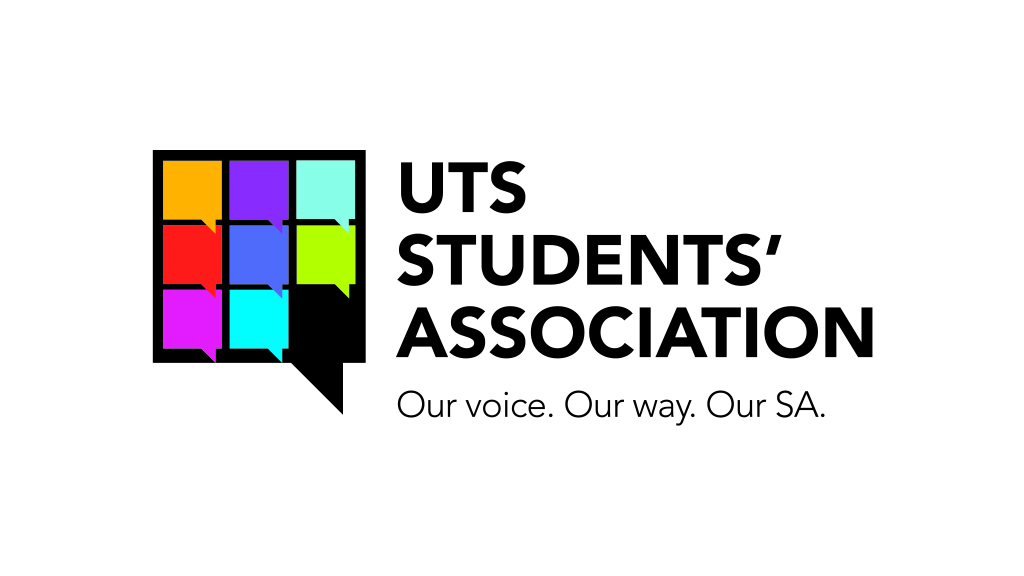
- Motto: Our Voice. Our Way. Our SA.
- Institution: The University of Technology Sydney
- Location: Level 3, UTS Tower Building 1, Broadway NSW 2007
- Members: 46,328
- Affiliations: National Union of Students (NUS)
- Website: utsstudentsassociation.org.au

The University of Technology, Sydney, Students' Association is the representative body for students at the University of Technology, Sydney. It is based on Level 3 of Building 1 at UTS. It publishes the student magazine Vertigo. The association has departments which have previously worked collaboratively with the university to achieve practical outcomes for students, as well as ensuring that the university is held to account over its handling of student issues. Historically, this has resulted in numerous successful campaigns which have won rights for students in the university.

== Executive ==
The executive of the UTSSA are responsible for the day to day operation of the Association, and are elected by the students annually.

=== 2025-26 Executive ===
The current executive members elected for 2025-26 are:

| Position | Name | Party | Alliance | Took office | Term ends |
|---|---|---|---|---|---|
| President | Neeve Nagle | Student Unity | Fire Up! | December 2025 | December 2026 |
| General Secretary | Salma Elmubasher | Student Unity | Fire Up! | December 2025 | December 2026 |
| Assistant General Secretary | Cam Perez | National Labor Students | Fire Up! | December 2025 | December 2026 |
| Education Officer | Ella Haid | Socialist Alternative | Social Justice | December 2025 | December 2026 |
| Welfare Officer | Sina Afsharmehr | Student Unity | Fire Up! | December 2025 | December 2026 |

== Student Representative Council ==
UTS Student Representative Council
- 56th Council
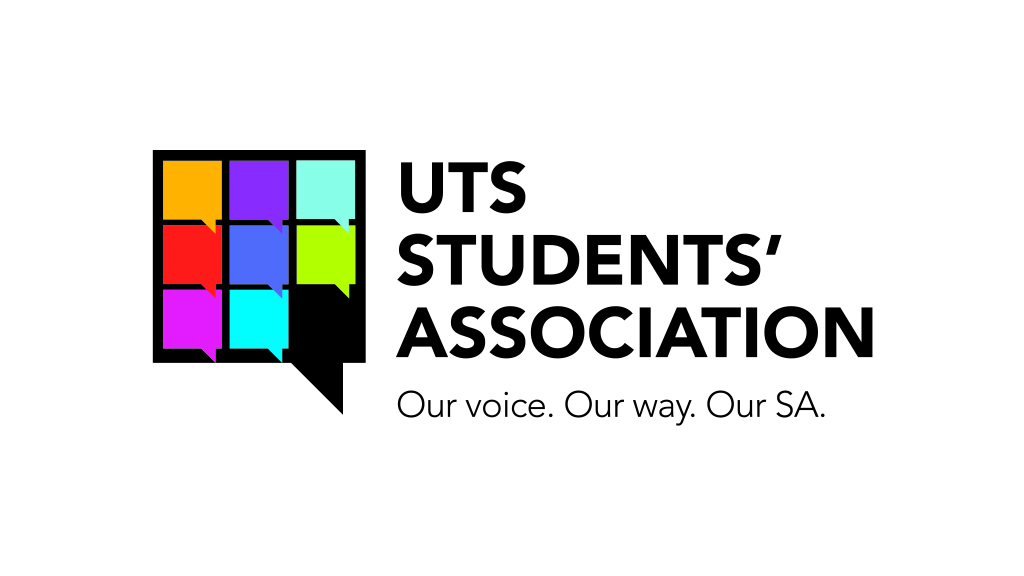

Type
- Type: Student body of the UTS Students' Association

History
- Founded: 1966; 60 years ago

Leadership
- President: Neeve Nagle, Labor Unity since December 2025
- General Secretary: Salma Elmubasher, Labor Unity since December 2025

Structure
- Seats: 25: 14 General Councillors; 5 Executive; 4 Directly Elected Office Bearers; 2 University Board
- Political groups: Socialist Alternative: 5 seats Labor Left: 3 seats Labor Unity: 14 seats UTSO: 1 seat NSWLS: 1 seat
- Length of term: 1 year

Elections
- Voting system: Single Transferable Vote
- Last election: October 2025
- Next election: October 2026

Website
- UTSSA Student Representative Council

Constitution
- Constitution of the UTS Students Association

Rules
- Bylaws of the UTS Students Association

The Student Representative Council is the representative body of students at UTS. It was founded in 1966 under the NSW Institute of Technology.

=== Role ===
The role of the SRC is to represent the students at the University of Technology Sydney Meetings are held monthly and are open to all students. They are usually held on campus and are promoted on social media pages. Important matters relating to student activism, concerns, budgets, and the function of the association are raised at meetings. Motions are raised and voted upon by councillors and are passed by a simple majority. However, a two-thirds requirement must be met to pass amendments to the constitution. Office bearers for the Queer, Enviro, Disabilities, and Ethno-Cultural collectives are elected annually by the SRC at the "repselect" meeting. To be eligible, a candidate must be a general councillor. Office bearers are elected by a majority of SRC members.

The UTSSA Student Council is democratically elected, with elections in the spring semester of each year.

=== Factions ===
Like most bodies representing students in Australia, the SRC is divided into factions. The factions work together in groups, in 2022 these are based on their election tickets: "Fire Up!" and "Left Action" (Labor Right, Labor Left), "Social Justice" (Socialist Alternative) and "Renew" (Liberal Party).

==== Student Unity ====
Student Unity, the centre-left of Labor. The group is affiliated with national Labor Right and the Australian Labor Party. They are the largest faction in 2025 and have held the presidency four times in the last four years. Student Unity's principles centre on unionism, service provision, and comprehensive advocacy.

==== NSW Labor Students (Labor Left) ====
New South Wales Labor Students (NSWLS), the unofficial student wing of Labor Left, its pillars are Feminism, Socialism, Unionism, and Democracy. The faction has been strongly criticised by other members of council for their absence on campaigns.

=== Composition ===
The current Student Representative Council as elected for 2024-25:

| Name | Party | Alliance |
|---|---|---|
| Mia Campbell | Labor Unity | Fire Up! |
| Adam Levett | NSWLS | Fire Up! |
| Januka Suraweera | Labor Unity | Fire Up! |
| Samiha Emran | NSWLS | Fire Up! |
| Neeve Nagle | Labor Unity | Fire Up! |
| Jermaine Petterson Heard | Labor Unity | Fire Up! |
| Vaishnavi Omar | Labor Unity | Fire Up! |
| Olivia Lee | Labor Unity | Fire Up! |
| Harshvardhan Suvarna | Labor Unity | Fire Up! |
| Salma Elmubasher | Labor Unity | Fire Up! |
| Yasmine Johnson | Socialist Alternative | Social Justice |
| Omar El-Sobihy | Unity | PYC |
| Amelia Ireland | NSWLS | Fire Up! |
| Ella Haid | Socialist Alternative | Social Justice |
| Natasha Abdulghani | Unity | PYC |
| Sina Afsharmehr | Labor Unity | Fire Up! |
| Lucia Thornton | Socialist Alternative | Social Justice |
| Daewah Thein | NSWLS | Fire Up! |
| Elliot Kameron | Socialist Alternative | Social Justice |
| Dirk Hoare | Labor Unity | Fire Up! |
| Amelia Rapitis | Labor Unity | Fire Up! |
| Eamonn Ryan | Labor Unity | Fire Up! |
| Peter Blair Munford | Labor Unity | Fire Up! |
| Kurt Cheng | Labor Unity | Fire Up! |

== Collectives ==
=== Women's ===
The Women's department creates a space and community for non-male identifying members of the UTS community and is affiliated with NOWSA. There is an autonomous space in Building 3. In 2016 they worked with the NUS Women's Officer to host the NOWSA conference for that year.

=== Welfare ===
The welfare collective is opened to all students but has in the past been asked to be the main organising body for students from low socio-economic backgrounds. The collective aims to help students by providing food and how2life workshops. These workshops have covered topics like cooking 101, renting how-to, and fair wage/your rights.

=== Education ===
The Education Collective, also known as the Education Action Group, is open to all students and is focused on campaigning around issues that affect all students on campus. This includes fighting against fee hikes and cuts to staff and for a better trimester system, more library hours, in addition to other campaigns led by the National Union of Students.

=== Indigenous ===
The Indigenous Collective is composed of Aboriginal and Torres Strait Islander students. The Collective meets regularly and works alongside Jumbunna Institute for Indigenous Education and Research. Founded in 2012, they run campaigns surrounding Indigenous issues and have been an active political and pastoral component of the Students' Association since their inception. Camille Smith is Indigenous Officer for 2022.

=== Queer ===
The Queer department runs campaigns for LGBTIQ students on campus and maintains a Queer Space on campus. Campaigns include anti-homophobia campaigns, student safety campaigns, Pride Week, Anti Queer Youth Homelessness campaign, Gender Neutral Bathrooms campaign and works with the Out2Party club on social events. The Queer department also works closely with the UTS Equity Department.

=== Enviro ===
Affiliated to the Australian Student Environment Network, the Enviro Collective is focused on green activism and campaigns like 'Flick my Switch' and 'Fossil Free University' as well as environmental campaigns off-campus.

=== Disability ===
The Disabilities Collective is for UTS students who identify as having a disability and/or medical condition. The group operates without a space but cooperates with many internal UTS sectors to ensure students with disabilities receive adequate support. The group also campaigns around larger abilities awareness projects.

=== Ethno-Cultural ===
The Ethnocultural Collective is composed of students from across many ethnic backgrounds, races, religions and beliefs with the aim to promote harmony and peace through fostering the diversity at UTS. The collective works to ensure representation and supportive frameworks for students experiencing or at risk of prejudice and opposes all forms of discrimination against migrants, minorities, and people of faith.

=== International ===
The International Collective is for International Students at UTS who seek networking opportunities and space to protest on issues which affect them. Campaigns include the right to access student travel concessions and fairer fee structures.

=== Postgraduate ===
The UTS Postgraduate Committee is a group of students who aim to make a positive contribution to the educational experience of Postgraduate students. There a range of initiative the Postgraduate Collective advocate, including fairer fee structures.

== Notable people ==
- Tanya Pilbersek was Women's Officer during her time at university.
- Matt Kean was a member of the Student Representative Council and served as SRC Executive Member for the Haymarket Campus during his time at university.
