= RGIT Australia =

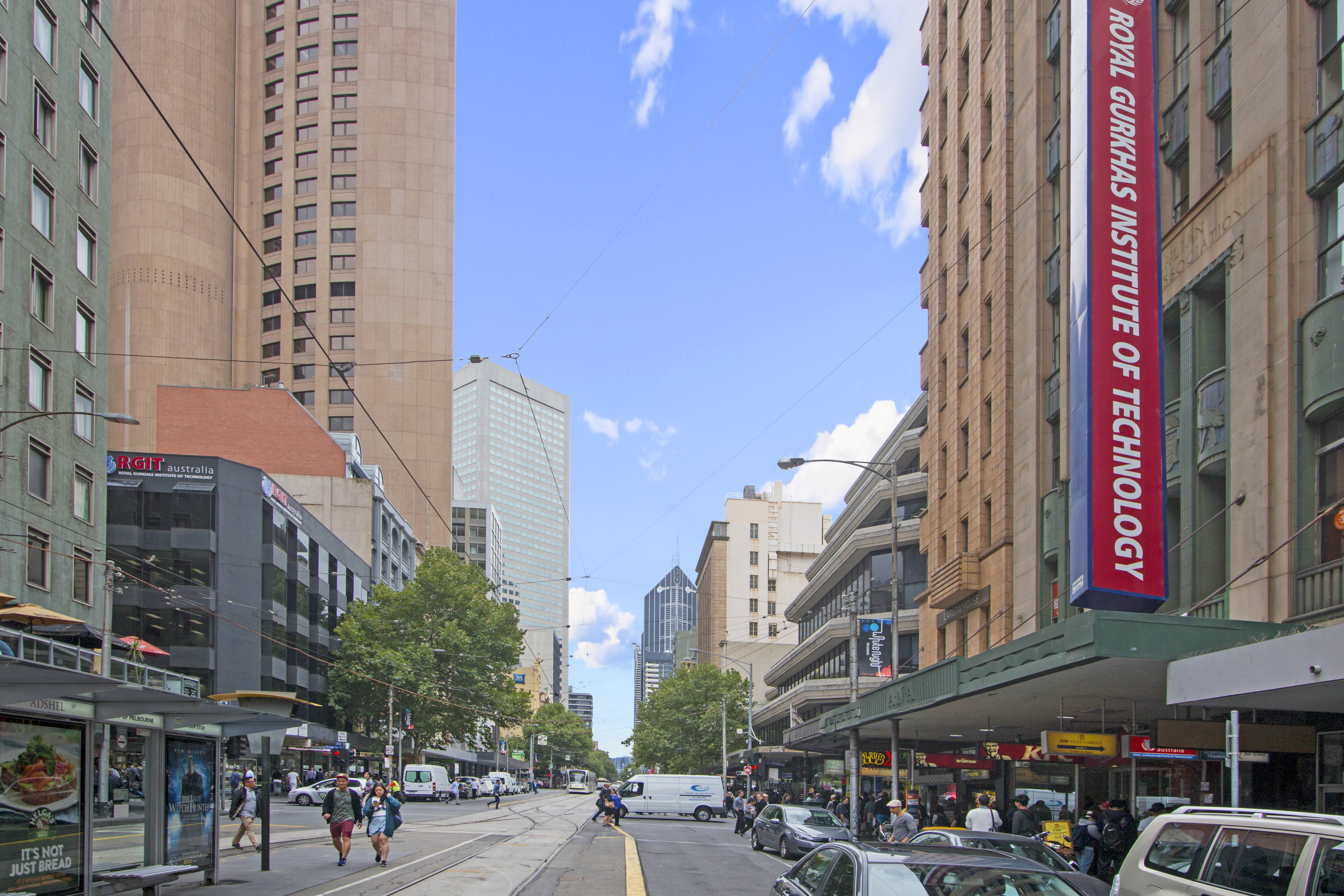
- Type: RTO
- Active: 2008–2026/08/22
- Officer in charge: Chandra Yonzon
- Location: Melbourne, Victoria, Australia
- Campus: Urban
- Website: www.rgit.edu.au www.rgithobart.edu.au/

Greenhill Education Group Pty Ltd trading as Royal Greenhill Institute of Technology (RGIT) Australia (National Provider No.: 22088 | CRICOS Code: 03002G) was a private registered training organisation (RTO) accredited by the National Regulator - Australian Skills Quality Authority (ASQA). It was located in Melbourne CBD, Victoria, Australia. In 2014, a second campus was established in Hobart Tasmania. They offer vocational courses in Business and Management, English, Health Sciences, Hospitality, Nursing and Information Technology. A wide selection of study options are offered from short courses, apprenticeships, traineeships, certificates, diplomas, advanced diplomas and Graduate Certificate to Graduate Diploma under the Australian Qualifications Framework. RGIT was placed in Court Ordered Liquidation by the Federal Court on 22nd August 2026.

== Campus ==
RGIT had three campuses in total, two of which are located in Melbourne, Victoria, and one located in Hobart, Tasmania.

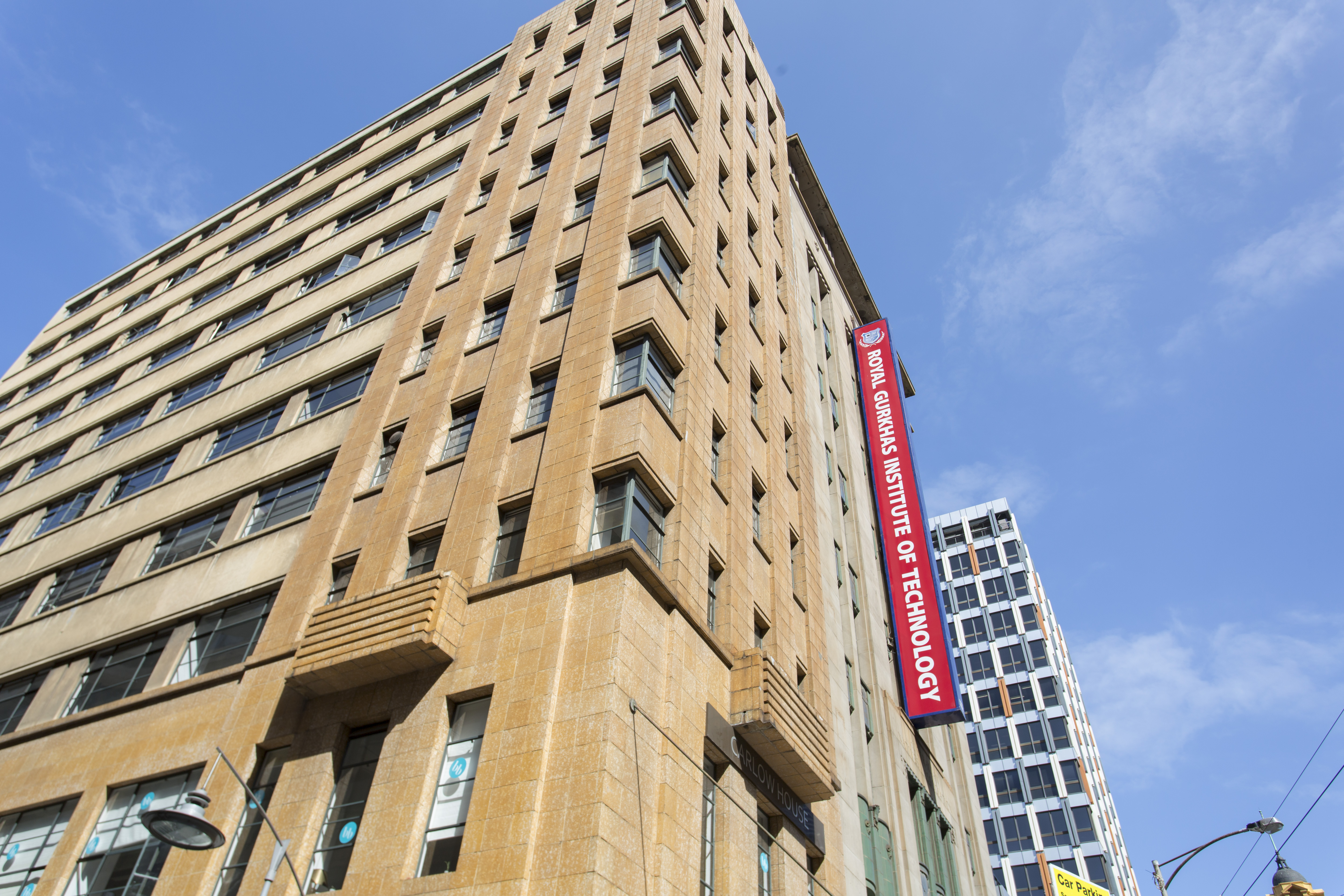
Main Campus 2008–present

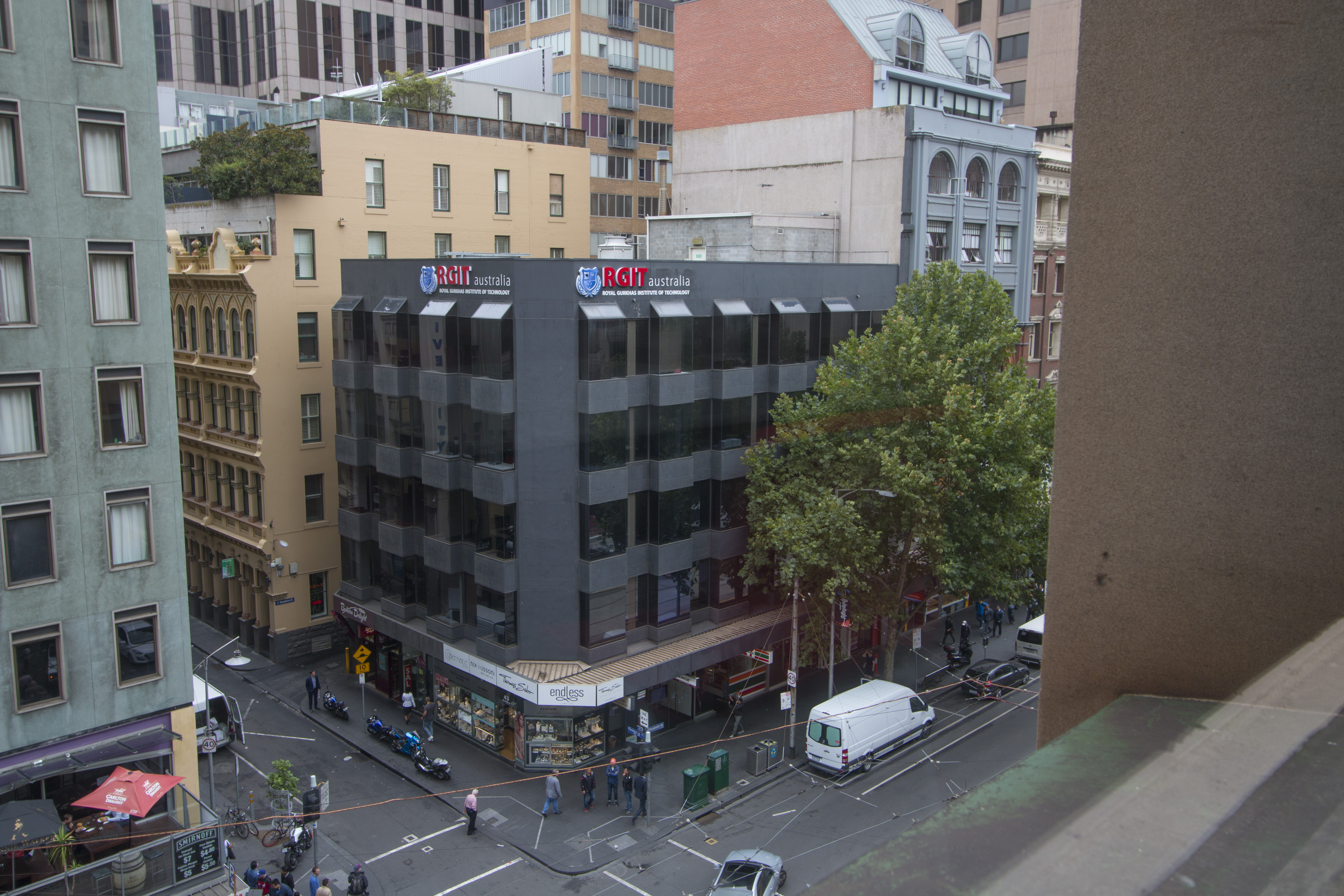
Victoria House 2015–present

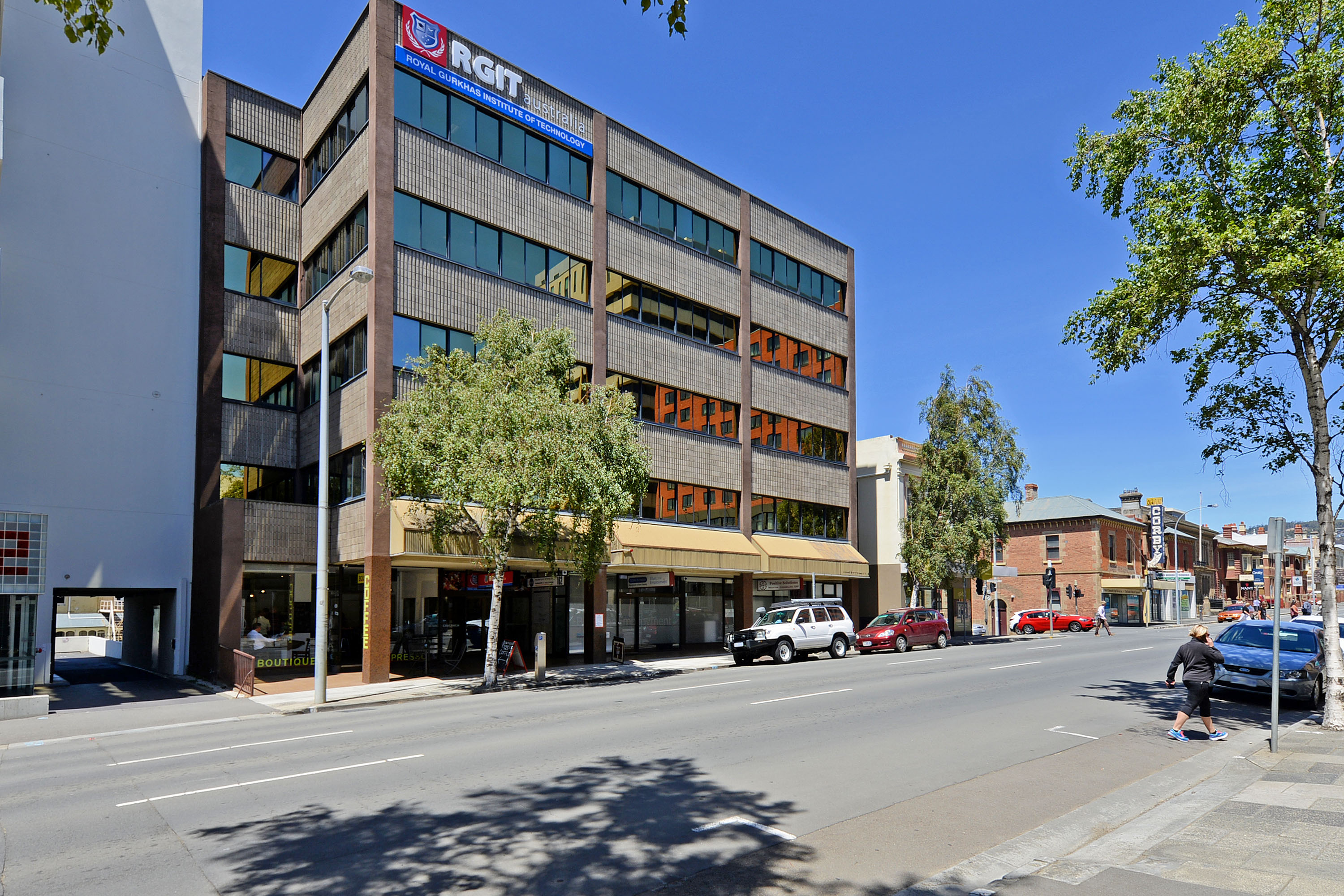
Hobart Campus 2014–present

The main campus site was housed in an Australian Natives Association building.

Students were provided the following facilities:

- Fully equipped training kitchens
- Classrooms
- Computer rooms including dedicated facilities for students undertaking Information Technology studies
- Barista room
- Student resource centers
- Free wireless internet

The Melbourne campuses were also close to Flinders Station and restaurants, bars and food outlets.

The Hobart campus classrooms had views of Mount Wellington and Hobart surrounds.

== Courses ==
=== Certificate and Diploma Courses ===
RGIT offered a variety of Certificate, Diploma and Advanced Diploma courses across the following departments:

Department	VET Teaching departments
Business and Management	Business; Leadership and Management
Health Sciences	Early Childhood Education and Care; Individual Support
Hospitality	Hospitality; Commercial Cookery; Patisserie
Information Technology	Information Technology Networking; Software Development

=== Short courses ===
Short courses were offered in a variety of areas including Barista, Latte Art, First Aid, Food Safety (1 and 2) and Responsible Service of Alcohol.

The courses ranged from four to eight hours and could be completed within a day.

== Student life ==
=== Student body ===
The campuses consisted of both local and international students. The international students were from 47 different countries and spoke around 50 different languages.

RGIT provided on-campus activities such as Open Day, publications, giveaways, graduations, resources and support to all students at all campuses.
