= Cruwsible =

Student newspaper of the Western Sydney University, Australia

- Front cover of Cruwsible Issue 1, 2013
- Type: Student newspaper
- Format: Magazine
- Founded: 2013
- Ceased publication: May 2016
- Language: English
- Headquarters: Western Sydney University
- Circulation: 6,000
- Website: Cruwsible Online

Cruwsible (stylised as crUWSible) was the student newspaper of the Western Sydney University, in Sydney, Australia, from 2013 to April 2016. It was renamed WSUPnews in April 2016 to reflect a change in the university's name.

Cruwsible was published quarterly by an editorially independent student team. Since its first edition, Cruwsible was available in both hard copy - with a circulation of 6,000, and online, via the publication's website and an app.

The name Cruwsible referred to the melting pot of cultures and backgrounds that make up the student body and Western Sydney demographic.

The editorial team is elected annually by popular vote amongst the Western Sydney University student body. The 2016 editors of the crUWSible, now W'SUP, are Ian Escandor, Melissa Swann, Hikmat Al-Malliki, Jodie Sale, Nicole Gismondo and Beau Dunne.

== History ==
In the lead-up to the first issue of Cruwsible, students contributed to a newsletter covering issues of the day with articles by then SRC President Luke Lau and student Peter Horsfield. The October 2012 edition of the Student Representation & Participation Newsletter had requests for student submissions for a new student Newspaper, which would be launched early the following year.

== Content ==
Written by students for students, Cruwsible took in submissions in the form of original articles, stories, artwork, photos, game and movie reviews and anything else of interest. Each edition contains an editorial, news, feature articles, music and movie reviews and Love Guru personal advice.
