= Seed (student newspaper) =

- Type: Student newspaper
- Format: Magazine
- Owner: Victoria University Student Union
- Editor-in-chief: Andrea McGlashan
- Founded: 1996
- Language: English
- Headquarters: Sunshine, Vic
- Circulation: 4000
- Price: Free
- Website: Seed Magazine website

Seed is a student newspaper published at Victoria University in Melbourne, Australia. The magazine, established in 1990 as NoName, is produced by the Victoria University Student Union.

== History ==
Victoria University was formed from the merger of a number of technical and higher education campuses in the suburbs of Melbourne. Seed grew out of the merger of NoName, published from 1992 at the Footscray Institute of Technology, and Genesis, published since 1995 at the Western Institute. In 1996, the two merged to form NoName + Genesis, before rebranding later that year as Seed.

== Art of Shoplifting controversy ==
In 1995, NoName, reprinted a controversial article from Rabelais Student Media, its La Trobe University counterpart, entitled The Art of Shoplifting – one of seven student newspapers to do so. Although the Rabelais editors responsible for the original article were prosecuted for ignoring a ban on publication issued by the state's Chief Censor; the editors of the other seven newspapers were not targeted by the authorities. Charges against the Rabelais editors were later dropped.
