= English Australia =

Association of English language schools in Australia

Coordinates: 33°52′44.02″S 151°12′44.02″E

English Australia, is an Australian industry association of English language schools for students from overseas studying in Australia. It was created in 1983 as the ELICOS Association.

== History ==
The ELICOS Association was created in 1983 by nine institutions that offered ELICOS. ELICOS stands for English Language Intensive Courses for Overseas Students and is designed for students who need to learn English before commencing formal studies in Australia.

The association helped create the National ELICOS Accreditation Scheme in January 1990. In July 1990, the association completed data for a federal industries commission inquiry. In September 1997, its member institutions in Victoria were Acacia College, the Hawthorne English Language Centre, Holmes English Centre, La Trobe University English Language Centre, Melbourne Language Centre, Royal Melbourne Institute of Technology, Swinburne University of Technology, and Victoria College.

The ELICOS Association changed its name to English Australia around 2001. English Australia is an industry association of English language schools for students from overseas studying in Australia. Its national headquarters are in Darlinghurst, New South Wales in Australia.

== Activities ==
The association started publishing EA Journal around 1983; it became the English Australia Journal: the Australian Journal of English Language Teaching with volume 24, number 2 in 2012. English Australia also maintains a web-based list of the ELICOS English courses provided by its members. It hosts an annual conference for its member institutions.

Since 2010, it has presented the English Australia IELTS Award for Academic Leadership, along with IELTS Partners. In April 2024, English Australia started a campaign to lobby politicians to removed visa restrictions for foreign students who want to study in Australia.
