= Australian National University Students' Association =

- Institution: Australian National University
- Location: Level 2, Di Riddell Student Centre, University Avenue, ANU, Acton Canberra, 2601
- Members: c. 24,000
- Website: anusa.com.au

Australian National University Students' Association is the students' union of the Australian National University (ANU). It is better known by its acronym, ANUSA. ANUSA acts as a representative body for the undergraduate, postgraduate and research students of the Australian National University, while also providing a number of goods and services to those students.

Not to be confused with ANU Union, a not-for-profit association that once managed retail operations in the former ANU Union Building.

Until June 2023, the Postgraduate and Research Students' Association acted in an equal capacity to ANUSA at the Australian National University as a representative body for postgraduate students. Since July 2023, ANUSA has been the sole representative body for all students at ANU.

== Objective ==
The objectives of the Australian National University Student Association are:

- To promote the welfare of, and further the interests of, undergraduate students
- To work for quality and equity in higher education
- To afford a recognised means of representation for undergraduate students within the university and the wider community
- To foster community, equity and diversity within the university

As a recipient of a student services and amenities fee, the ANU utilizes ANUSA under its formal process of student consultation as required by the Student Services, Amenities, Representation and Advocacy Guidelines (Representation Guidelines).

== History ==
=== Key events ===
==== "Wadgate" ====
The 1996 ANUSA elections saw the losing "Rage" ticket embroiled in scandal. 146 votes for the "Rage" presidential candidate Daniel Jenkins were excluded by the Returning Officer after allegations of ballot stuffing. The fraud was discovered when a student sitting in a cafe saw a voter attempt to stuff a wad of ballots into the ballot box. When the Returning Officer opened the ballot box, five wads of ballots were found, all of which gave their first preference to Jenkins.

=== Facilities and services ===
ANUSA moved into premises in the Concessions Building in Union Court in 1999, following a major refurbishment. The Brian Kenyon Student Space was opened in 2011, named after Brian Kenyon, who drove ANU's late night bus for 26 years until 2014.

=== Recent history ===
==== 2024 Pro-Palestine Protests ====
In April 2024, following Israel–Hamas war protests on university campuses in the United States, ANUSA and a number of other societies and clubs staged their own pro-palestine encampment on Kambri lawns. Rallies by members of the encampment as well as counter-protests by Jewish students occurred in the following days, attracting local and national media attention, as well as a notable police and security presence similar to other universities in Australia.

=== List of presidents of the students' association ===
The following students served as President of the ANU Students' Association

- 1963 Chris Higgins
- 1965 John Yocklunn, Peter Paterson
- 1972 Richard Refshauge
- 1985 Lesley Ward
- 1987 Kate Andrews
- 1989 Mary Todd
- 1995 Hamish McPherson, Craig Cork,

== Structure ==
=== Membership ===
ANUSA is an association of ANU's more than 24,000 students. There is only a single class of membership. An ANU student is a member of ANUSA provided that they have not written to the General Secretary of the Association specifically stating that they do not wish to be a member of the Association. The provision to opt out of membership is rarely exercised.

=== Finances ===
ANUSA is financed by a block grant from the university, using revenue collected from the Student Services and Amenities Fee (SSAF). In 2016 ANUSA was allocated $1,681,535 by the university, or 32.6% of the total SSAF revenue collected.

== Student advocacy ==
Whilst ANUSA is affiliated with the National Union of Students (NUS), it did not pay accreditation fees in 2016 due to concerns about the efficacy of NUS and issues relating to student wellbeing at the NUS National Conference. This resulted in its voting rights being suspended at the NUS National Conference that year. In 2017, the body reaccredited to the NUS, however failed to accredit in 2018 again after the NUS did not meet a number of Key Performance Indicators (KPIs) passed by the ANUSA SRC.
