= National U =

Australian student tabloid

National U was a national student-run tabloid newspaper published by the Australian Union of Students. It was preceded by the short lived 'U' and followed by the short lived 'Axis'. In the 1960s and 1970s, it was published by the National Union of Australian University Students, the precursor of the Australian Union of Students. Due to the political issues of the era the newspaper was a vital part of Australian national student politics of the time.

It ceased publication in the early 1980s.

== Publication details ==
- U (Melbourne, Vic.) National Union of Australian University Students journal. Melbourne : The Union, 1965-[1966]. Vol. 1, no. 1 (29 September 1965)-
- National U. Melbourne: [National Union of Australian University Students], [1966]-1975. ISSN 0313-8224
- Axis : national student newspaper. Carlton, Vic. : Australian Union of Students, 1976-1976. ISSN 0313-8232. No. 1 (8 March 1976)-no. 12 (18 October 1976)
- National student. Carlton, Vic. : Australian Union of Students. ISSN 0156-5346. 1977.
