= National Union of Students (Australia) =

National students' union in Australia

- Abbreviation: NUS
- Predecessor: Australian Union of Students
- Formation: 1987; 39 years ago
- Headquarters: 1/740 Swanston Street, Carlton VIC 3053
- Location: Australia
- Members: 21 affiliated university student unions representing over 1 million students
- President: Felix Hughes
- General Secretary: Akash Nagarajan
- Key people: Education Officer: Yasmine Johnson; Welfare Officer: Suchi Kalia; Women's Officer: Husan Ara; Queer Officer: Hayden O'Brien; Queer Officer: Eddie Stephenson; First Nations Officer: Daniel McClelland; Disabilities Officer: Mia Williams; International Students Officer: Quashfia (Ariya) Binte Masud; Ethnocultural Officer: Syed Taqi Abbas; Small & Regional Officer: Amelia Meyers; TAFE Officer: Olivia Walden; Environment Officer: Clayton Watts
- Main organ: National Executive
- Affiliations: Global Student Forum; Australian Federation of Disability Organisations
- Website: https://nus.asn.au/

The National Union of Students (NUS) is the peak representative body for Australian higher education students. A student union is eligible for membership by its classification as a legitimate student representative body at any Australian post-secondary training provider. The NUS typically organises NUS National Conference (NatCon), NUS Education Conference (EdCon), and the Presidents' Summit each year in addition to other smaller conferences.

== History ==
=== Formation ===
NUS in its current form came into being in 1987 after the collapse of its predecessor, the Australian Union of Students (AUS), in 1984. The AUS was first known from 1937 to 1971 as the National Union of Australian University Students (NUAUS), before allowing membership of colleges of higher education in 1971, which necessitated a name change.

=== Membership fees ===
In 2003, NUS membership fees became indexed to consumer price index (CPI) removing some of the strain on the union's finances. In 2004, the NUS charged $5 per equivalent full time study loads (EFTSL) of students represented by each member organisation. This raised small fears that many small and regional campus organisations might disaffiliate due to increases in affiliation fees.

In 2023, affiliation fees were set at $2.00 per EFTSL and in 2024 the National Executive of the NUS set affiliation fees at $2.11 per EFTSL.

=== Voluntary student unionism ===
The introduction of voluntary student unionism (VSU) by the Howard government led to student union membership plummeting by up to 95%. Following associated reductions in funding for services provided by many student unions, the NUS called for alternative options to be explored to restore funding and ensure students would remain able to access student union services. In a written submission responding to a discussion paper on the impact of VSU, the NUS raised concerns that reliance on direct funding from the federal government or universities would impact the ability of student representatives to effectively advocate for students.

In 2024, the NUS's official policy, set by National Conference in December 2023, was to campaign for a 50% minimum share of Student Services and Amenities Fees (SSAF) for student unions. In May of 2024, it was announced that government would be mandating that student unions receive 40% of SSAF, coming close to meeting the NUS's demands.

=== Accreditation of universities ===
In 2016, Australian National University Students' Association voted against accrediting with NUS, citing problems with the conduct of factional delegates at the National Conference. The Adelaide University Union (AUU) voted to cease their SRC from authorising payments of Accreditation to NUS in their March Meeting. The AUU's SRC later condemned the move and restated its affiliation, and intention to pay accreditation fees autonomously. The Wollongong Undergraduate Students' Association also held a referendum during 2016 to end their affiliation with the NUS; the affiliation was later restored.

In 2017, the Australian National University Students' Association voted to accredit with NUS once again. Also in 2017, the Tasmanian University Union voted to end its affiliation with the NUS. The Tasmanian University Student Association re-accredited in 2023. The University of Queensland Union also re-accredited to the NUS in 2023.

== Governance ==
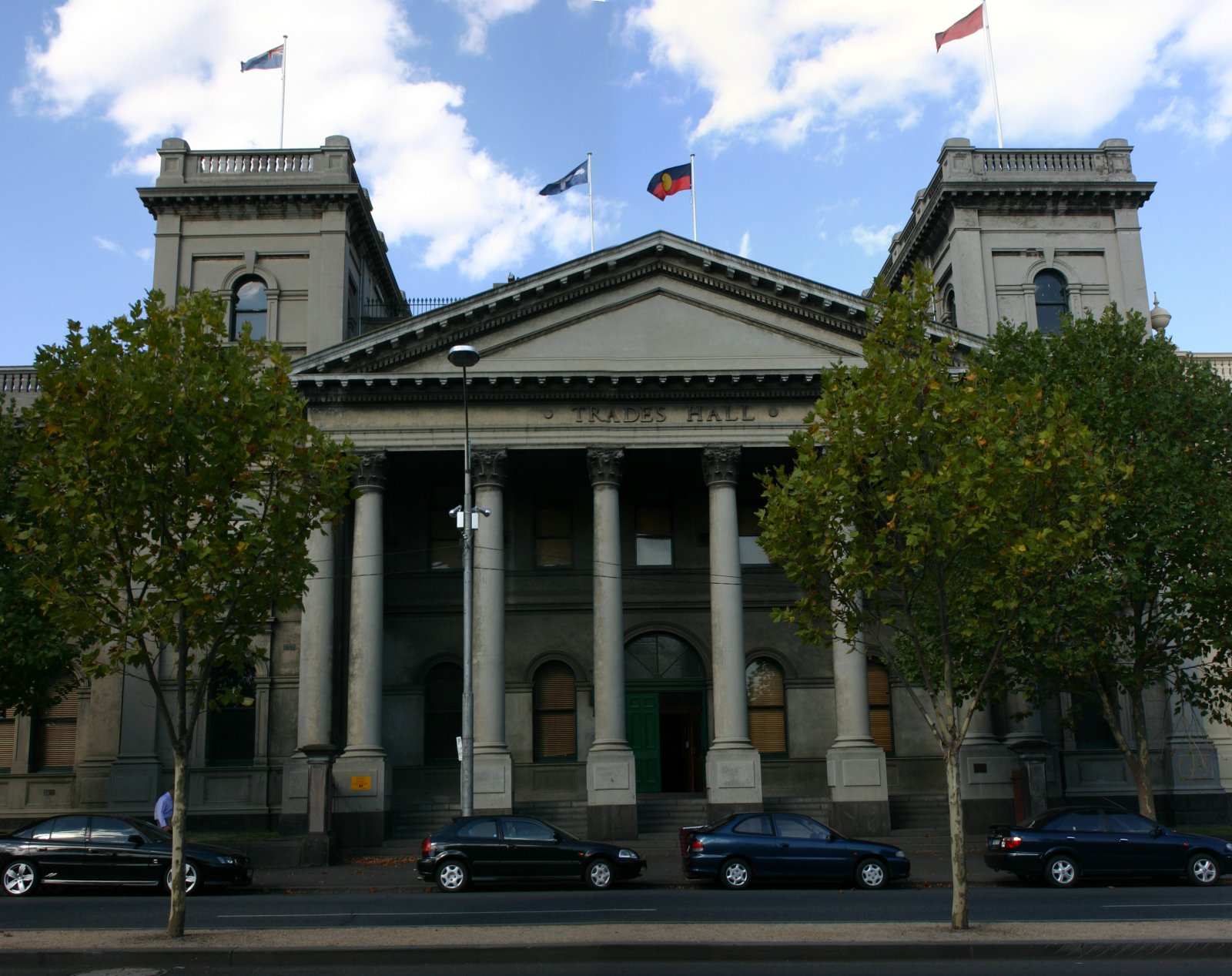
Victorian Trades Hall, former headquarters of the NUS

NUS' national structure is formalised into both a National Executive and State Branches. The National Executive is the primary decision-making body of the NUS, voted in by delegates from each member student union at the National Conference.

=== National Executive ===
The responsibilities of the National executive, as described within the NUS constitution, include; setting the budget for the NUS; regularly monitoring of the finances of NUS; employing staff on behalf of NUS; authorising the publication of material on behalf of NUS; and implementing and interpreting the policy of the NUS. The National Executive may also delegate its powers as it considers appropriate. The members of National Executive are:

- The National President (chair, casting vote only),
- The National officers (voting),
- 12 General Executive Members (voting), and
- The State Presidents (voting).

National Officers of the NUS do not carry a vote at the National Conference of NUS and members of National Executive may not hold more than 1 voting position on National Executive at the same time.

==== National Officers ====
The National Officers of NUS are elected annually at the National Conference, with their terms commencing in January.

A motion to abolish the National Environment Officer position was passed at the 2016 National Conference. This change came into effect in 2017; however, the role was re-established at the 2025 National Conference.

A motion to create the National Vocational Education Officer position was passed at the 2021 National Conference. This change came into effect at the 2022 National Conference.

The paid national officers of the NUS are:

- National President,
- National General Secretary/National Deputy President,
- National Education Officer,
- National Welfare Officer,
- National Women's Officer (who must be a woman),
- Two National Queer/LGBTQIA+ Officers (one of whom must be woman-identifying),

Paid national officers are paid an hourly wage equal to the Australian Federal minimum wage with the National President and National General Secretary paid 1 full-time equivalent (FTE) wage and other paid officers are paid a minimum of 0.5 FTE. In 2024, the honorarium of the National Education Officer, National Welfare Officer, and National Women's Officer was set at 0.75 FTE by the National Executive of the NUS. In the same meeting, the honorarium for the National Queer Office was set at 1.0 FTE to be split between the two officers.

The unpaid national officers of the NUS are:

- National Small and Regional Campuses Officer (who must be a student currently enrolled at a small and/or regional NUS member campus),
- National First Nations Officer (who must identify as a student from an Aboriginal or Torres Strait Islander background),
- National Ethnocultural Officer (who must identify as a student from a culturally or linguistically diverse background),
- National International Students Officer (who must be currently enrolled as an international student),
- National Disability Officer (who must identify as a student with a disability),
- National Vocational Education Officer,
- National Environment Officer.

=== State Branches ===
The state branches of the NUS include; New South Wales, Victoria, South Australia, Tasmania, the Australian Capital Territory, and Western Australia.

The members of State Executive are:

- The State President (chair),
- The State Education Vice President, and
- The President (or equivalent officer) from each accredited campus.

As of 2026, State Executive positions are;
Name	Position	Branch
Leila Clarke	President	Australian Capital Territory
Flynn Goerlitz	Education Vice-President	Australian Capital Territory
Neeve Nagle	President	New South Wales
Caitlin Veigel	Education Vice-President	New South Wales
Gana Ahmed	President	Queensland
Michael Ursinus	Education Vice-President	Queensland
Yeshaiah Varona	President	South Australia
Liam Southern	Education Vice-President	South Australia
Jack Oates Pryor	President	Tasmania
Molly Doon	Education Vice-President	Tasmania
Tharun Balasubramanian	President	Victoria
James McVicar	Education Vice-President	Victoria
Rama Sugiartha	President	Western Australia
Basirutalin Ellaha Hadiya Naeemi	Education Vice-President	Western Australia

==== State Officers ====
The State Branch Officers of NUS are elected annually at the National Conference, with their terms commencing in January. State and Territories officers are only elected if there are accredited campus from that State/Territory. The State Branch positions other than President and Education Vice President were abolished after the 2015 National Conference, coming into effect at the conclusion of the 2016 term of office.

=== Departments ===
There are 11 departments of the NUS, each overseen by the relevant National Officer with a limited degree of autonomy. These departments coordinate discussions with the relevant local officers at each university's student union, host specific conferences for their issues, and used to include the state branch officers (until those roles were removed in 2016).

These departments are:

- Education Office
- Welfare Office
- Women's Office
- Queer Office
- Disabilities Office
- First Nations Office
- Ethnocultural Office
- International Students Office
- Small & Regional Campuses Office
- Vocational Education/TAFE Office
- Environment Office

=== National Conference ===
National Conference (also referred to as NatCon), is the NUS's annual general meeting (AGM). The NUS must hold National Conference within 5 months of the end of its financial year, with the conference beginning on the second Monday in December. The conference sees delegates from all accredited campuses gather to vote on policy that decides the direction of the union for the next year. The election of national and state officers, as well as campus representatives, occurs during the week of National Conference. Member organisations and associate organisations are able to appoint observers to National Conference.

NatCon has at times been criticised for the perceived lack of transparency, owing in part to the fact that filming is typically banned for the entirety of the conference. Proponents of the ban on filming have argued that this ban is to protect the privacy of attendees and enable them to engage more freely in debate, not to prevent transparency.

== Factions ==
Historically, the NUS has been dominated by members of Young Labor, with every President being a member since the creation of the NUS in 1987.

Many NUS delegates are members of a faction, which are groups of students operating with a shared political platform. Some delegates alternatively choose to be independent from any factions and these students are typically referred to as small-i independents. Typically, each faction has a pre-conference caucus where they decide their positions on policy.

The main factions are

- Student Unity (Unity): typically associated with Labor Right and typically the faction with the highest number of delegates. This faction is known to bind votes. As a result of a long-standing sweetheart deal with NLS, the National General Secretary has been a member of Unity every year except one.
- National Labor Students (NLS) typically associated with Labor Left . This faction is known to bind votes. As a result of the aforementioned sweetheart deal with Unity, the National President has been a member of NLS every year since the formation of the NUS. Since 2024, NLS lost their WA and QLD branches as well as majority of their NSW branch.
- Socialist Alternative (SAlt, SA, Trots): are a Marxist faction that have recently held the second largest count of delegates. This faction is known to bind votes.
- Australian Liberal Students' Federation (Liberals, Libs): typically associated with the Liberal party. Generally, Liberal-controlled universities disaffiliate from the NUS, leading to them generally having little power. In 2017, they gave their votes to Unity.
- Grassroots Independents (Grindies): typically associated with the Greens. This party is not known to bind votes.
- Forge: Following the a 2024 National Labor Students split, the Western Australia caucus of NLS left the faction, shortly followed by the Queensland caucus of NLS. Members of the Queensland and part of the WA NLS caucus shortly reformed as a faction known as Forge.
- New South Wales Labor Students (NSWLS): On 16 February 2025, 11 NSW members of NLS were purged due to direct breach of the national constitution. These members, alongside those sympathetic to the purged, reconstituted themselves as NSWLS the following day. The remaining NSW members that did not join NSWLS remain in NLS.
- Victorian Alliance (VA): A Labor-affiliated faction that was established in 2025 after members split from the Victorian branch of Student Unity. VA is made up of both Labor right and Labor left leaning members.
- Western Australia Independents (WA Independents, Windies): The Windies also left NLS in 2024 prior to Forge. They are made up of the previous members of WA NLS excluding those that are in Forge.

== Financial and structural crisis ==
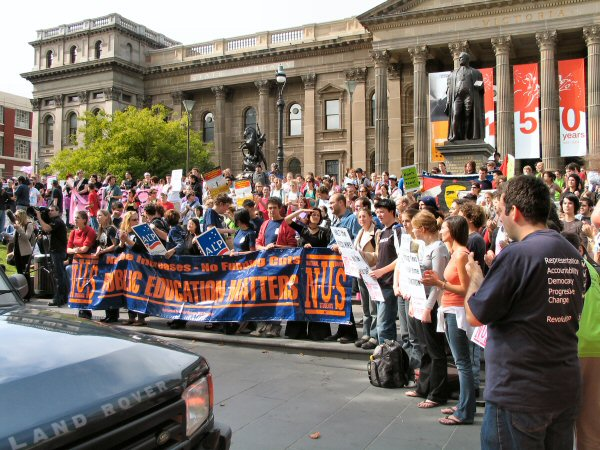
A NUS rally to protest funding cuts to higher education

In a report commissioned by the NUS secretariat in 2013, independent auditors TLConsult authored a report which cited NUS' "inflexible factional system" as detrimental to the organisation and leading to "historical accounting approach ... out of step with modern financial practices". Auditors "question-ed whether some stakeholders generally understood their responsibilities to NUS", citing alliances by some national officers to factions, rather than NUS, as contributing the structural issues faced by the organisation.

The TLConsult audit said that NUS only had enough cash reserves to "sustain the organisation for approximately one year in its current form" and that although voluntary student unionism had resulted in a notable decline in revenue, it was structural problems, "unchanged for nearly two decades", that were the primary cause of the NUS' current financial problems.

In response to the financial pressures outlined in the audit which cited significant deficits run by NUS over the previous few years, and following outgoing NUS President Deanna Taylor's admission that they "the advice given to NUS is that were our income and expenditure levels to remain status quo, NUS would not exist beyond the next few years", delegates to the 2014 conference voted in favour of a financial and structural review, and to eliminate the stipend for the positions of National Indigenous, International Students and Disability Officer. However, an attempt to eliminate state officer bearer positions (presidents excepted) was not passed by conference delegates.

== Union affiliation ==
Typically, university student unions' Representative Councils will vote on NUS accreditation. As of 2025, accredited university unions include;

State	Union	University	Representation			
State	Union	University	EFTSL	Delegates	Total Votes	%
ACT	Australian National University Students' Association	Australian National University	17,726	6	36	2.68%
NSW	Arc @ UNSW SRC	University of New South Wales	46,391	7	93	6.92%
NSW	University of Sydney SRC	University of Sydney	36,463	7	73	5.44%
NSW	University of Technology Sydney Student Association	University of Technology Sydney	34,344	7	69	5.14%
NSW	Wollongong Undergraduate Students' Association	University of Wollongong	18,908	7	38	2.83%
NSW	Western Sydney University SRC	Western Sydney University	34,890	7	70	5.21%
SA	Flinders University Student Association	Flinders University	18,149	7	37	2.76%
SA	University of South Australia Student Association	University of South Australia	22,744	7	46	3.43%
QLD	Queensland University of Technology Guild	Queensland University of Technology	36,512	7	74	5.51%
QLD	University of Queensland Union	University of Queensland	44,824	7	90	6.70%
VIC	Deakin University Student Association (DUSA)	Deakin University	43,438	7	87	6.48%
VIC	La Trobe Student Union (LTSU)	La Trobe University	27,300	7	55	4.10%
VIC	Monash University Student Union Caulfield	Monash University (Caulfield)	8,546	0	0	0.00%
VIC	Monash Student Association (MSA)	Monash University (Clayton)	42,526	7	86	6.40%
VIC	RMIT University Student Union (RUSU)	RMIT University	56,157	7	113	8.41%
VIC	Swinburne Student Union (SSU)	Swinburne University	47,342	0	0	0.00%
VIC	Victoria University Student Union (VUSU)	Victoria University	24,629	7	50	3.72%
VIC	University of Melbourne Student Union (UMSU)	University of Melbourne	59,195	7	119	8.86%
WA	Curtin Student Guild	Curtin University	42,159	7	85	6.33%
WA	UWA Student Guild	University of Western Australia	22,695	7	46	3.43%
WA	Edith Cowan University Student Guild	Edith Cowan University	21,701	7	44	3.28%
Tas	Tasmanian University Student Association	University of Tasmania	15,645	6	32	2.38%

== Notable people ==
Many federal and state Labor politicians have held roles in the NUS during their time as students, including:

- Lizzie Blandthorn served as the National Secretary of the National Union of Students in 2001.
- John Carey served as the National President during his time as a student.
- Lisa Chesters served as Women's Officer of the National Union of Students in 2003.
- Roger Cook was the founding President in 1987 during his studies at Murdoch University.
- Luke Foley served as NSW President of the National Union of Students in 1991.
- John Graham served as National President in the 1990s.
- Rose Jackson was the first President from a unified National Labor Students in 2006.
- Richard Marles the second General Secretary in 1989 during his studies at the University of Melbourne.
- Daniel Mookhey served as General Secretary in 2004.
- Lisa Neville served as National President in the 1980s.
- Michael Pettersson served as National Welfare Officer and the ACT Branch President of the National Union of Students.
- Penny Sharpe served as National President in 1994.
- Laura Smyth served as the Victorian State Branch President during the 1990s.
- Evan Thornley was a co-founder of the National Union of Students.
- Sheena Watt served as Indigenous officer of the National Union of Students in 2008.
- Penny Wong was on the National Executive during her studies at the University of Adelaide.
- Zaneta Mascarenhas was the WA Branch President in 2003 and 2004 during her time at Curtin University.
- Louise Pratt was the WA Branch Education and Welfare Officer in 1993 and 1994 during her time at the University of Western Australia.

Some federal and state Liberal and Greens politicians have also held roles in the NUS during their time as students, including:

- Evan Mulholland
- Jamie Parker
- Robert Simms served as State Education Officer in 2004 during his studies at Flinders University.

Non politicians who served as office bearers at the NUS include the following:

- Van Badham served as NSW president of the National Union of Students in 1998.
