= Voluntary student unionism =

Voluntary student unionism (VSU), as it is known in Australia, or voluntary student membership (VSM), as it is known in New Zealand, is a policy under which membership of – and payment of membership fees to – university student organisations is voluntary. Australia passed legislation enacting VSU in 2005, which came into force on 1 July 2006. Forms of VSU in Australia had been law in the state of Western Australia from 1994 until 2002, and in Victoria from 1994 to 2000. New Zealand passed legislation enacting VSM in 2011, rules which came into force on 1 January 2012.

== Arguments and issues ==
Arguments for and against VSU typically fall into two broad categories: civil rights impacts and social impacts.

Requiring membership of student organisations is seen by some as a form of forced unionisation, contrary to freedom of association. Alternatively it may be seen as being required to belong to a professional organisation, in which case it would merely be a means of ensuring standards. Opponents of VSU argue that it silences students' voices by removing universal membership of a student organisation.

A common thread in the argument against VSU is the notion of a campus culture, or the university experience. University has traditionally been a time of broadening horizons, socialising, and political activism. Opponents argue that VSU makes it more difficult for students to have high quality sports grounds, lively music and social venues, and the resources necessary to mount protests and political campaigns, leading to moribund campuses. This was a view expressed by Senator Barnaby Joyce. Proponents counter that the free-market system rewards venues and establishments which students enjoy and value, and that it lets students choose their own level of contribution to a political cause.

== Australia ==
Although universities and student unions each had their own rules, students generally were required to become a member of their campus student organisation automatically upon enrolment. A fee for student services or amenities was charged to students, typically once a semester, once a year, or in a lump sum upon enrolment. This fee was typically collected by the university, which usually took a portion in collection fees and passed the rest to campus student organisation(s). These organisations then distributed the money according to their own rules.

On 9 December 2005, the Higher Education Support Amendment (Abolition of Compulsory Up-front Student Union Fees) Bill 2005 was passed in the Senate, and received the Royal Assent on 19 December 2005. Since 1 July 2006, Australian universities have faced fines of A$100 per student for compelling payment for any non-academic good or service.

Many student organisations opposed VSU, expressing concern about their ability to provide social, academic, and political services under VSU as well as meet long-term financial commitments without guaranteed revenue streams. Australian universities, as represented by the Australian Vice-Chancellors' Committee (AVCC), were generally in support of membership and compulsory fees for student organisations for three broad reasons. First, they prefer to leave service provision in the hands of students; second, the activities associated with campus organisations help to market the universities to prospective students; and third, they view student unions as valid representative bodies. The Australian National University, the University of New South Wales, the University of Sydney, the University of Queensland, the University of Newcastle and the University of Adelaide have provided funding to their respective student unions, subject to various conditions.

== New Zealand ==
Under legislation passed in 1999, but subsequently superseded, VSM could be enacted at any New Zealand university by a referendum of students. Only students at the University of Auckland voted to enact VSM, affecting membership of the Auckland University Students' Association. Consequently, students enrolled since that vote go without membership in the student association unless they become aware of it, find out how to join, and afford the fees without the option of having it included in their student loan. Students at the University of Waikato enacted VSM, but later returned to universal student membership, when a referendum was held during study week.

In October 2009, Heather Roy's Education (Freedom of Association) Amendment Bill was drawn from the ballot. The bill was greatly delayed due to a large number of public submissions (4837 in total, including 132 oral submissions), necessitating the Select Committee stage to be extended from the normal six months to a full year. It was later delayed due to filibustering by the Labour Party and of particular note, Trevor Mallard, of a bill ahead of it on the Order Paper – the aim was to push the debate out so the third reading could not occur before the 2011 election, causing the bill to die as Roy was not seeking re-election. However, the bill eventually passed its third reading on 28 September 2011, 63 votes in favour to 58 opposed. All student associations in New Zealand are now voluntary.

== Terminology ==
There are several terms being used to describe voluntary student unionism and its opposite, each with its own frequency, accuracy, impartiality, and favourability.

Voluntary arrangements:

- Voluntary student unionism (VSU)
- Anti-student organisation legislation (ASOL)
- Voluntary student representation (VSR) – A "watered down" alternative to VSU, in which compulsory fees for student politics are banned, but may still be levied for non-political uses.
- Voluntary student membership (VSM) – New Zealand arrangement similar to VSU
- Optional membership of student organisations (OMSO) – positive euphemism for VSU.

Universal arrangements:

- Universal student unionism
- Universal student representation
- Student organisation
- Opt-out student membership
- Compulsory student unionism
