= Azlan McLennan =

Australian artist

- Born: 1975 (age 50–51); Washington, D.C., U.S.
- Education: Victorian College of the Arts in Melbourne.
- Known for: Visual art
- Movement: Anti-art, Political satire

Azlan McLennan (born 1975 in the United States) is a visual artist and socialist activist based in Melbourne, Australia. He is a graduate of the Victorian College of the Arts. His art is known for its political content and has been the subject of considerable debate and media attention in Australia.

== Art ==
Conceptually, McLennan's work tends to be unambiguous and antagonistic from a left-wing perspective, loosely following the traditions of agitprop, anti-art and Institutional Critique, incorporating elements of détournement, readymade or installation. His works have often been characterised as controversial by conservative politicians, journalists and art critics, usually portraying the artist in a negative light. Alternatively, various liberal lawyers, academics and activists have defended his works, usually on the basis of free speech, due to the offence sometimes caused by his art for its often overt left-leaning bias. The artist has expressed public criticisms over Zionism, the war on terror, Australian nationalism and racism, the mandatory detention of asylum seekers, various political figures and the managerial class of the art world.

McLennan has cited the artists John Heartfield and Leon Kuhn as influences. He has work in collections of the National Gallery of Australia and the National Library of Australia.

== Political affiliations ==
McLennan is a member of the Trotskyist organisation Socialist Alternative. Previously, he has been associated with the Socialist Alliance, the Stop the War Coalition, Students for Palestine, the Refugee Action Collective, the University of Melbourne Graduate Student Association, the Victorian College of the Arts Student Union and the United Voice trade union. He regularly produces posters for the Australian far left's various political demonstrations and meetings. He has written articles for the publications of both Socialist Alternative and the Socialist Alliance.

== Controversy ==
=== Victorian College of the Arts ===
In August 2003, McLennan hired a Group 4 Securicor guard to keep gallery punters out of an exhibition opening at the VCA. Group 4 run immigration detention centres in Australia, such as Baxter Detention Centre and the now closed Woomera Detention Centre. The security guard was reportedly humiliated due to the incident which occurred at a time of high criticism of the John Howard government's treatment of asylum seekers.

=== 24seven ===
In May 2004, McLennan produced Fifty-six, an exhibition designed to coincide with Nakba Day, the title drawing on the number of years since the establishment of Israel. The public exhibition in the shop front window space of 24seven Gallery on one of Melbourne CBD's busy streets, was censored by the City of Melbourne days after it was installed. The installation consisted of a large wall painting of an Israeli flag, with "debatable" statistics on the gallery's window about Israel's treatment of Palestinians. The scandal made international news, many pro-Israel individuals and groups accusing McLennan of antisemitism. This put a number of Victorian political figures such as former Premier Steve Bracks, Lord Mayor John So and former City of Melbourne councillor Kimberley Kitching under pressure to respond. The use of taxpayer's money to fund the space fuelled a lot of the debate. McLennan also deeply outraged some critics by insinuating that the Nazis had a similar position on what they termed degenerate art. McLennan maintains a strong criticism of Israeli policies.

=== Citylights ===
In August 2004, McLennan displayed State Sponsored, a collection of portraits of Hamas militants, including Sheikh Ahmed Yassin and Dr. Abdul Aziz Rantisi and the dates they were assassinated. The work was exhibited at Citylights project – a public art space in a Melbourne CBD lane way. McLennan was accused of glorifying terrorism by Ted Lapkin, a senior policy analyst of the Australia/Israel & Jewish Affairs Council. Andrew Mac, Citylights' curator and director defended the work on the grounds of diversity of opinion stating the artist's use of "state sponsored" referred to state terrorism.

=== Platform Artists Group ===
In September 2005, the City of Melbourne intervened to terminate McLennan's Canberra's 18 exhibition shortly before it was scheduled to be shown at the Platform artists group's Artist-run initiative (ARI), Platform 2. The exhibition was to include images of the then 18 Islamic organisations proscribed as terrorists by the Australian Government and the basis for their formation. City of Melbourne Deputy Mayor Gary Singer claimed the proper guidelines were not followed. Human rights campaigner and barrister Julian Burnside claimed the censorship was about governments testing how much Australians would tolerate such occurrences. McLennan accused City of Melbourne of political censorship and appeasing Zionists. Singer's areas of special interests ironically include civil liberties.

=== Monash University ===
Monash University Art and Design Faculty in Melbourne withdrew McLennan's video Mind the Gap in October 2005, ironically made for the same exhibition Monash had agreed to show the censored Canberra's 18 work. The video contained graphic footage of the beheading of British contractor Kenneth Bigley by Tawhid and Jihad in 2004. The video criticised former British Prime Minister Tony Blair for his role in the Iraq war. The censorship is likely to have been motivated by the Australian Anti-Terrorism Bill 2005, particularly the controversial return to the crime of sedition introduced by the Howard government some weeks later and passed into law the following month; a move highly unpopular amongst the arts sector.

=== Urban Art ===
City of Melbourne and acting Transport Minister Bob Cameron censored Pay Your Way in January 2006 while McLennan was in residency in Indonesia. The posters – part of the Urbanart ARI program – were displayed in public tram shelters and pulled down only hours later due to complaints. The works featured images of Jean Charles de Menezes, a Brazilian man shot dead by London police and accused Muslim terrorist, Jack Thomas. The works were characterised as racist and Islamophobic, yet McLennan claimed the works were satirising the post 9-11 racism and Islamophobia perpetuated by pro-US governments. McLennan is also a Muslim himself. Thomas' lawyer, Rob Stary attacked the work for jeopardising the trial yet weeks later would defend McLennan publicly against the Footscray police.

=== Trocadero Art Space ===
Only weeks after the Pay Your Way affair, McLennan's Proudly UnAustralian was removed by the Victoria Police in Melbourne. The exhibition – featuring a burnt Australian flag – took place at Trocadero Art Space who rents a public billboard to exhibiting artists. It was to coincide with the 2006 Australia Day in January. The work was removed some days prior this date and McLennan arrived back in Australia days later to a media furore. The scandal had been criticised as offensive by those such as Federal Liberal Party MP Bronwyn Bishop who attempted to introduce a ban on flag burning, and the national president of the Returned and Services League. Free speech advocates such as the National Association for the Visual Arts and criminal defence lawyer Rob Stary denounced the police's actions as an attack on civil rights. This took place only a few short months after the 2005 Cronulla riots and fuelled the broader debate about racism in Australia.

=== Australian Centre for Contemporary Art ===
McLennan wrote an article in 2006 criticising the artistic director of the Australian Centre for Contemporary Art (ACCA), Juliana Engberg over her reaction to artist and VCA student, Ash Keating and his appropriation of ACCA's waste disposal for the use of his art. The Engberg/Keating scandal became widely known amongst Melbourne art circles from the ACCA exhibition opening where it took place and later through the independent electronic magazine Crikey. McLennan's polemic further fuelled debate over Engberg's credentials.

=== Anna Schwartz Gallery ===
McLennan featured in Rules of Engagement at Melbourne ARI West Space in May 2007, which dealt with "relationships, power and exchange within the art system" according to the show's curator Mark Feary. McLennan's contribution, Art in a Capitalist Society depicted an authoritative picture of leading private Australian gallerist Anna Schwartz, linked to a quote about exploitation from the Karl Marx treatise Das Kapital. Schwartz has previously criticised McLennan and some have accused McLennan of taking revenge.

=== University of Melbourne ===
In a July 2009, Farrago interview, McLennan attacked the University of Melbourne over the merger with the Victorian College of the Arts, the Melbourne Model, the liquidation of the VCA Student Union and likened the Vice-chancellor, Glyn Davis' perceived political censorship to Adolf Hitler's use of Fascist Art and Joseph Stalin's use of Socialist Realism. He also depicted Davis and the Provost, Peter McPhee, as Sex Pistols musicians, Johnny Rotten and Sid Vicious in a parody of the Never Mind the Bollocks album cover as well as depicting Davis as the violent psychopath, Alex DeLarge in Stanley Kubrick's film adaptation of A Clockwork Orange. McLennan had previously attacked Davis and the university administration as the former General Secretary of the VCA Student Union.

== See also ==
- Victorian College of the Arts Alumni
- Socialist Alternative
