= Stop the War Coalition (Australia) =

Australian peace advocacy group (2003-)

- Founded: 2003
- Type: Advocacy group
- Purpose: Anti-war, Peace
- Location(s): Sydney and Melbourne, Australia
- Region served: Australia
- Method: Demonstration

Stop the War Coalition (StWC) is an Australian anti-war group initially formed in Sydney in 2003 in response to the US-led wars in Iraq and Afghanistan and the general "war on terror" of which the Australian Government has been a strong ally.

== Campaigns ==
=== Obama administration ===
StWC was involved in organising a protest of US President Barack Obama when he was to visit Australia in March 2010. StWC criticised the Obama Administration for "dramatically escalating the war in Afghanistan", citing the authorisation of more aerial bombings, and targeted killings in Pakistan than the former US President George W. Bush oversaw during his terms in office. StWC also accuses the Democrat Government of increasing military threats against Iran and of bombing Yemen.

=== Wars in Iraq and Afghanistan ===
In the past, StWC was involved in mobilising people against former conservative Liberal Prime Minister, John Howard and his strong support of the military occupations of both Iraq and Afghanistan and continue to oppose the Rudd-Gillard Government's support of US wars, calling for "the complete withdrawal of military personnel from both countries and for Australian military spending to be replaced by Australian aid to those countries".

=== War on terror ===
Stop the War Coalition speak-out against David Hicks' imprisonment in Guantánamo in 2007.

StWC protested against the Australian Government's controversial Anti-Terrorism Laws which were revised and passed by Parliament on 6 December 2005. The Bill includes the crime of Sedition which had been effectively defunct since 1960. StWC Sydney told a crowd of 1, 000 protesters a day before the Bill was passed that the laws "would pose a threat to anyone who disagrees with Australian foreign policy, while compromising everybody's civil liberties".

StWC were among many groups campaigning against the incarceration of former Australian Guantánamo detainees, David Hicks and Mamdouh Habib, who were held without trial by the US, as well as supporting the campaigns for Joseph "Jack" Thomas who was the first Australian charged under the Anti-Terrorism Laws and Dr Mohamed Haneef, an Indian doctor charged over a collapsed terrorism plot in the UK, subsequently having his Australian working visa cancelled by former Minister for Immigration, Kevin Andrews. StWC accuse the Australian Government of leading "anti-Arabic racism" and "anti-Muslim attacks", which they argue are a pretext for these case examples. After the Cronulla race riots of 2005, StWC convener Pip Hinman likened the political climate to that of the anti-Asian racism during the period of the White Australia Policy, blaming the Government for the riots and accusing them of overshadowing the Right Wing political platform of the former One Nation leader, Pauline Hanson, in the 1990s.

StWC also organised the protest against the 2007 Australian visit of former US Vice President Dick Cheney for his role in the Iraq War and occupation. The protest took place on 22 February, during Cheney's three-day visit to discuss Australia's unpopular involvement in Iraq and general commitment to the "war on terror". Around 200 protesters were refused by police to march through the streets of Sydney, which was under high security for the Vice President's visit.

=== 2008–09 War in Gaza ===
StWC called on the Rudd Government to cut all ties with Israel during the 2008–09 War in Gaza. Julia Gillard, the Acting Prime Minister, angered Palestinian supporters over her refusal to condemn Israel's bombing campaign in which white phosphorus was used. 5000 demonstrators were reported to have marched in Sydney and as many as 12,000 gathered in Melbourne to protest the Israeli attacks on Gaza on 18 January, the same day as Israel announced its ceasefire.

=== 2007 APEC conference ===
Anti-APEC protest in Sydney, 8 September 2007.

StWC initiated the 8 September protest of the 2007 APEC conference and visit of former US President George W. Bush in Sydney. Figures of protest attendees vary widely from 3000 estimated by police to 10,000 estimated by protest organisers. The summit saw the biggest security operation the country had ever seen, which included 3, 500 police and security guards and 1500 Defence Force personnel. The then Prime Minister, John Howard and New South Wales Premier, Morris Iemma were criticised along with the police for what were seen as "heavy-handed" tactics, such as the arrest without bail of Greg McLeay, a 52-year-old accountant who accidentally strode too close to a motorcade while crossing the road with his 11-year-old son, the erection of a 2.8-metre-high security barrier for public restricted zones of the city, a $600,000 high-pressure water cannon bought especially for the protest and the removal of many police officers' identification badges during the demonstration.

=== 2006 G20 summit ===
Protests of the 2006 G20 summit and visit of former US Deputy Secretary of Defense Paul Wolfowitz in Melbourne took place on 18 November, where the main rally of approximately 2,000 people was relatively peaceful but in other parts of the city, a much smaller contingent of around 70 Black Block-styled anarchists called the Arterial Block took part in civil disobedience and fought with police.

=== 2006 War in Lebanon ===
StWC took part in the 2006 protests against Israel's War in Lebanon. On the annual Hiroshima Day rally on 6 August, while the war was still taking place, Melbourne protesters burned the Israeli flag on the steps of Parliament which drew public criticism from the Victorian Greens, some of whose members were present at the demonstration. StWC argued Israel's incursion into Lebanon was not an anti-terrorism measure but "a war of annihilation" and "expansion".

== Police monitoring ==
In 2008 it was revealed through The Age that the Victoria Police had been spying on several activist and community groups in Melbourne, including StWC, with an officer of the controversial Security Intelligence Group, posing as an activist and infiltrating these groups. Mick Armstrong of StWC and Socialist Alternative said "On the one hand you've got police saying 'we will be open and co-operate with you' if you tell them what you are doing ahead of a rally... but then you learn they are still spying on you. It's completely unjustified." The revelation of the police action was widely condemned by activists and commentators.

== Associates and notable supporters ==
StWC has no formal membership but is made up of and organised by several groups, organisations and individuals. The following (although not exclusively) have been involved in either directly organising, supporting or working alongside StWC:

- AID/WATCH
- Andrew Ferguson
- Anti-APEC Network
- Anti-Bases Coalition
- Architects for Peace
- Australian Democrats
- Australian Greens
- Australian Lawyers Alliance
- Australian Manufacturing Workers Union
- Australian Muslim Civil Rights Advocacy Network
- Australian Student Environment Network
- Bill Hartley
- Campaign for International Cooperation and Disarmament
- Canterbury-Bankstown Peace Group
- Carmen Lawrence
- Chilean Popular and Indigenous Solidarity Network
- Civil Rights Defence
- Coalition for Justice and Peace in Palestine
- Committee for Peace and Justice in Lebanon
- Communist Party of Australia
- Construction, Forestry, Mining and Energy Union
- Daryl Melham
- Electrical Trades Union of Australia
- Fair Go for David
- Federation of Australian Muslim Students and Youth
- Freedom Socialist Party
- Gaza Defence Committee
- Geelong Trades Hall
- General Union of Palestinian Workers
- Greenpeace Australia Pacific
- International Socialist Organisation
- Islamic Council of Victoria
- Islamic Friendship Association
- Islamic Girls and Women's Group
- Japanese for Peace
- Jews Against the Occupation
- John Robertson
- Just Peace Western Australia
- Justice Action
- Justice for Hicks & Habib
- Kerry Nettle
- La Trobe University SRC
- Labor Council of New South Wales
- Latin America Solidarity Network
- Maritime Union of Australia
- Marrickville Peace Group
- Medical Association for the Prevention of War
- Melbourne Palestine Solidarity Network
- Monash Student Association
- Moonie Valley Peace Network
- National Union of Students
- New South Wales Teachers Federation
- Nuclear Free Australia
- Peace Organisation of Australia
- Pennant Hills Peace Group
- Queensland Peace Network
- Radical Women
- Refugee Action Collective (Victoria)
- Research Initiative in International Activism
- Resistance
- RMIT University SRC
- Rod Quantock
- Socialist Alliance
- Socialist Alternative
- Stop Bush Coalition
- Stop G20 Collective
- Students Against War and Racism
- Students for Palestine
- Swinburne Student Union
- Sydney Korean Progressive Alliance
- Sydney University Centre for Peace and Conflict Studies
- Terry Hicks
- Union Solidarity
- Unity for Peace
- University of Melbourne Student Union
- Victorian College of the Arts Student Union
- Victorian Trades Hall Council
- Western Sydney Peace Group

== See also ==
- Stop the War Coalition (UK)
- A.N.S.W.E.R.
- List of anti-war organizations
