= University of Melbourne ALP Club =

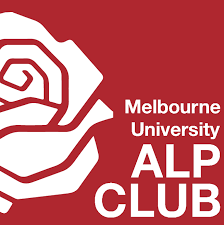
- Banner of the University of Melbourne ALP Club
- Formation: 1925; 101 years ago
- President: Toby Putland
- Website: https://umsu.unimelb.edu.au/buddy-up/clubs/clubs-listing/join/6077/

The University of Melbourne Australian Labor Party Club is a political student club at the University of Melbourne. It is the oldest student political club in Australia, founded in 1925- several months prior to the Sydney University Labor Club.

It was founded to provide a means of organising students who support the Australian Labor Party. The club prides itself on participating in social movements for a progressive and socialist Australia, drawing inspiration from union movements and supporting the rights of workers avidly. In fact, it is notable that the Labour Day strikes and now holiday are based on the stone masons building the University of Melbourne where the club operates.

The club has been hugely influential on the University of Melbourne Student Union, and its members have held numerous positions within it.

== History ==
The ALP Club was originally established as the Labour Club in 1925 by Lloyd Ross, Brian Fitzpatrick and Ralph Gibson. The Club grew to have 200 members, and in 1932 was the largest club on campus. In response to Communist influence on the club, in 1934 B. A. Santamaria formed a more moderate Labour-aligned club, the Radical Club. Throughout the 1930s, 40s and 50s the club was central to campus life, with members being prominent in clubs and societies, the running of the SRC and in the student magazine Farrago, as well as producing their own magazine Proletariat to distribute their ideas. In the 1950s, future Victorian Premier John Cain and future Opposition Leader Clyde Holding were involved in the organising of the club.

In the late 1980s and early 1990s, the ALP Club was closely involved in the Left Alliance, a group of left-wing students that opposed the union between the Labor Club (affiliated to the Labor Right) and Liberal Club.

In 2003, the Clubs & Societies Department of the Student Union, which had a Liberal Club and Labor Club majority, disaffiliated the ALP Club on a technicality. Despite lengthy attempts to overturn this decision, the student union was put into liquidation before the issue could be resolved.

The club has been affiliated to the Melbourne University Student Union (MUSU), and more recently the University of Melbourne Student Union (UMSU). After rebuilding throughout the early-mid 2000s, tickets for the Student Union election that had the involvement of the Club have won the majority of elections, usually under the banner of the Stand Up! ticket. Several members of the Club have also gone on to be President of the National Union of Students.

The culture of Victorian politics has been heavily moulded by the influence of the club, especially in the mid-20th century.

== Politics ==
In recent history the club has been decidedly left-leaning. This is in contrast to the University of Melbourne Labor Club, who are associated with the Labor Right. The existence of two Labor/ALP Clubs simultaneously is a result of a split in the Labor Club in 1949.

Currently, the club is aligned with the National Labor Students, the national Labor Left student faction. Prior to the formation of NLS in 2006, the club was part of Australian Labor Students (ALS), and had been part of the National Organisation of Labor Students (NOLS) prior to the split between NOLS and ALS in 1997.

In 1950, the stated goal of the club was:

The A.L.P. Club, working from the basis of the A.L.P. platform, stands for the progressive reformation of society by democratic means, so as to achieve social justice for all

This goal continues to this day. The club has previously supported campaigns for free education and free healthcare, universal student unionism, feminism and democratic socialism among other concerns.

== Past presidents ==
Year	President
2027	Toby Putland
2026	Chris Vassiliadis
2025	Catherine Baker
2024	Lucy Rachman Vascotto
2023	Ngaire Bogemann
2022	Ruby Craven
2021	Felix Sharkey
2020	Gurpreet Singh
2019	Hannah Buchan
2018	Alice Smith
2017	Dominic Cernaz/ James Bashford
2016	Hana Dalton
2015	Nathaniel Seddon-Smith
2014	Lindsey Motteram
2013	Annalivia Carli-Hannan
2012	Anna Morrison
2011	Noni Sproule
2010	Bruno Freidel
2009	Onagh Bishop
2008	Onagh Bishop
2007	Michael Griffith
2006	Dean Rizzetti
2005	Caitlyn O'Dowd
2004	Joshua Cusack
2003	Paul Erickson
2002	Ben Barnett
2001	Ben Barnett
2000	Daniel O'Keefe
1999	Alan Black

== Notable alumni ==
- Brian Fitzpatrick
- Clyde Holding
- John Cain
- Andrew Giles
- Paul Erickson
- Stephen Murray-Smith
- Manning Clark
- Ian Turner
- Jim Cairns
