= ALSA =

ALSA or alsa may refer to:

- Advanced Linux Sound Architecture, a Linux kernel component
- Air Land Sea Application Center, an organization of the United States Department of Defense responsible for developing tactics and procedures
- Airline Stewardess Association, a trade union
- ALS Association, an American non-profit organization dealing with amyotrophic lateral sclerosis (ALS) or Lou Gehrig's disease
- Alsa (bus company), based in Spain
- Australian Law Students' Association, an Australian law student organisation
- Harees, a Mappila dish in Kerala, south India, alternatively called alsa)
