= Melbourne Model =

Academic degree structure

A promotional banner advertising the University of Melbourne's "Dream Large" campaign at the Parkville campus, 2009.

The Melbourne Model is a standardised academic degree structure which was introduced at the University of Melbourne in 2008. The Melbourne Model is designed to align itself "with the best of European and Asian practice and North American traditions" specifically for "[i]nternationalising academic programs and aligning degree structures with the 'Bologna model'". As a result of its implementation the university's 96 undergraduate courses were replaced with six undergraduate degrees and professional programs. These were Arts, Science, Environment, Biomedicine, Music, and Commerce. Agriculture was added later, and Environments controversially replaced by Design. The idea was that career-oriented specialisation would occur at postgraduate level, rather than in the broad undergraduate degree itself. The shifting of Medicine and Law to postgraduate level was new in Australia.

The Melbourne Model received criticism from students, academics, unions, and the Australian press with the criticism focused on the loss of jobs (and the consequent negative impact on staff to student ratios) rather than the Model itself. The idea that students needed to take a postgraduate degree to obtain qualifications necessary for employment (e.g. in Law, Education, and Social Policy) was perceived as a way to capture more fee-paying students at postgraduate level.

Job losses were initially concentrated in the Arts Faculty but later spread to other faculties, including the Victorian College of the Arts (VCA or VCAM). Although the program is often compared to the American tertiary education system, it uses only three-year undergraduate degrees whereas in the United States bachelor's degrees are almost universally designed as four-year programs.

Since the consolidation of the Melbourne Model, the university was placed 28th in the world in the Times Higher Education World University Rankings for 2012–2013 and 36th in the world in the QS World University Rankings for 2012–2013. In 2019, the university was 32 in the THE rankings and 38 in the QS. The university was placed 33rd in the 2022 THE rankings and 33rd in the 2023 QS rankings.

== Reasoning behind the move to the "Melbourne Model" ==
In their Growing Esteem whitepaper the University of Melbourne put their rationale for the move in this manner:

There are international moves to standardise degree structures. The familiar American pattern of four-year arts or science degrees followed by graduate school is being echoed by the Bologna Declaration among European nations. The Bologna model, set to become the European standard from 2010, advocates a three-year undergraduate program with advanced courses taught in a two-year masters degree or a three-year doctoral program. Historically, this move updates an ancient structure, that of the University of Paris in the 13th century. If this becomes a global norm but Australia continues to prepare its professionals through undergraduate programs, in the longer term our graduates may no longer be seen as globally competitive.

== Criticism ==
The University of Melbourne introduced the Melbourne Model officially in 2008. By the end of the academic year it was reported that administration had admitted to some subjects being either too broad or too narrow and the need for a reassessment on the Model. A leaked document revealed the University of Melbourne will have spent $11.6 million on marketing for the Melbourne Curriculum by the end of 2008, followed by another $16 million by the end of 2010. The university's "Dream Large" slogan has since been a source of ongoing ridicule by some University of Melbourne students and students have even called for the sacking of Davis as Vice-Chancellor over the curriculum changes. Students initially disrupted the official 2007 launch of the Melbourne Curriculum which has been followed by various demonstrations and student occupations against the Melbourne Model and the university in general. However, data show that since the consolidation of the Melbourne Model, the university has been placed top in Australia and 33rd in the world in the Times Higher Education ranking.

== Response ==
=== Trade and Student Unions ===
National Tertiary Education Union accused the university of "PR spin" over the decision to address media over the potential loss to 130 jobs in the Arts Faculty before speaking to staff or the union. The union also criticised Melbourne over their call for voluntary redundancies after the union released results of a survey finding "more than 90% of staff said their workload had increased" since 2007 and the same percentage of respondents "reported having concerns about restructuring or changes to their area..."

National Union of Students Education Officer, Colleen Bolger, stated that staff "are being told they will need to front up at McCarthy-style "trials" to plead the case for their subjects over their colleagues'" criticising the university's Dean of Arts Belinda Probert and the "business mentality of those who run universities", many of whom, she claims, also sit on company boards.

Australian Law Students' Association Vice President (Education), Mitch Riley, conceded the pedagogical benefits of the Melbourne Model but claimed students from low socioeconomic, rural and indigenous backgrounds would not be able to study at Melbourne with the high fees involved.

University of Melbourne Student Union President, Libby Buckingham, claims Melbourne are spending too much money on "capital works, advertising and the transition to the Melbourne Model..." and that "the future of the (arts) faculty is being shaped by voluntary redundancies rather than … consultation about the curriculum."

Victorian College of the Arts Student Union accused the University of Melbourne's restructuring as a pretext for shutting down political representation for Victorian College of the Arts students. Victorian College of the Arts became a faculty of the University of Melbourne in 2007 and the student union has argued the university's plans have been about rationalisation as opposed to genuine expansion and conclude the university's refusal to discontinue the student union funding is politically motivated.

Sydney University Postgraduate Representative Association accuses University of Melbourne of exploiting its postgraduates through the Melbourne Model as undergraduates cannot be charged full fees, assuming the university's "prime motivation for moving to the new Model is better business and more income."

University Council member Tammi Jonas resigned from the UoM Council on Monday 7 Dec 2009 "in protest against the University’s exploitation of its casual labour force, which is largely made up of postgraduate students." This issue links with the SUPRA statement noted above, which directs blame at finances underpinning the Melbourne Model. Tammi Jonas' response to the university's reaction to her resignation was published later on her blog.

=== Academic ===
University of Melbourne Australian Studies senior lecturer, Graham Willett, while arguing for Victorian academics to pursue industrial action over redundancies, also suggested the university could save money by cutting Vice-Chancellor Davis' salary, which stood at AU$610,000 in 2007, and getting rid of the new position of Provost previously held by Peter McPhee.

University of Melbourne Department of History Associate Professor, David Phillips, called the Melbourne Model a "nightmare for the Arts Faculty" and that the "entire Australian university community should be worried about what is involved" with the direction the University of Melbourne was steering higher education.

University of Melbourne Department of Science and Mathematics Education staff member, Ted Clark, blamed the university for using the Melbourne Model transition as an excuse to implement cuts to staff jobs: "It is now impossible to argue that there is a separation... between cost cutting or staffing requirements from the introduction and implementation of the Melbourne Model."

University of Melbourne Faculty of Architecture, Building & Planning Professor, Miles Lewis, attacked the university's demotion of Dr. Paul Mees – a former senior lecturer in transport planning who subsequently resigned, taking up a position at RMIT University – over Mees' criticism of the government's privatisation of public transport. Lewis argued that the Melbourne Model "requires the relentless pursuit of mediocrity and the routing out of any independent intellects from the university", blaming Melbourne for catering to the agendas of government and wealthy industry bodies.

University of Melbourne staff member and education activist, Melanie Lazero, in a public debate between the University of Melbourne Student Union and the university described the Melbourne Model as "shallow" and "a neoliberal idea of education", claiming the model limited students choices.

University of Melbourne staff member known only as "SP", described her/himself as "a victim of "Growing Esteem" at Melbourne", accusing VC Davis of continuing former VC Alan Gilbert's role of being financially driven: "Restructuring needs to be fully participatory, democratic, and transparent. It is not. Possibly the worst restructuring I have seen in 15 years."

University of Melbourne academic staff member known only as "BRY" is, like "SP" above, also a victim of "Growing Esteem", and has criticized "the immense damage that Vice-Chancellor Glyn Davis has caused to the university"

University of Melbourne's current and former staff have also been quoted anonymously as saying that the cuts to arts at the university were significant while in relation to the workload: "Everyone is running around in shock saying we've got so many students we've got no idea what to do about it."

Victorian College of the Arts Director, Professor Andrea Hull, announced her retirement in 2008 shortly after The Age published a leaked email from Hull to Victorian College of the Arts staff stating that she and her colleagues disagreed to further compromises over the implementation of the Melbourne Model at the arts college, "nor to a name that wipes out the VCA's prestige and history...". Ironically, Hull had been repeatedly criticised by the Victorian College of the Arts Student Union over perceived inaction in relation the Melbourne Model, yet Hull denied that her retirement was related to Melbourne's overruled decision to change the college's name.

Monash University Communications lecturer and Herald Sun journalist, Dr Caron Dann, said: "I like the idea of the University of Melbourne model in theory. HOWEVER (and it's a big however), I am suspicious because all around me I see universities behaving like profit-making businesses and using management models that do not help academics provide the best education for students."

La Trobe University School of Business Professor of Economics, Harry Clarke, speculated the Melbourne Model "will reduce numbers seeking to utilise its programs" and "programs will become more expensive in time and aggregate tuition charges" accusing their scholarship program of being "distributionally regressive" aimed at mainly well-off private-school-trained students.

Swinburne University Vice-Chancellor, Professor Ian Young, argued that University of Melbourne students would have to study for five years, as opposed to three to get a vocational qualification: "There's no doubt that the model actually increases the cost of education, either to the student or to the nation or both, by some 60 per cent. So it is a more expensive form of education. It may well be an excellent education, but it is undoubtedly a more expensive form of education."

Queensland University of Technology economist, Paul Frijters, pointed to the Melbourne Model's "risk that there will be a dumbing down of content" in degrees taught and the fact that many UoM undergraduates come from private high schools "offering them scholarships will have a fairly limited effect."

University of Sydney Acting Vice-Chancellor, Professor Don Nutbeam, expressed concern the Melbourne Model would end up devaluing or giving less importance to new high school graduates.

=== Student ===
University of Melbourne Arts students speaking to Dean of Arts Faculty, Professor Belinda Probert, and Dean of MSLE, Rick Rousch, during a student occupation of the Philosophy building during the university's Academic Board meeting in 2007.

University of Melbourne Arts student, Ben Coleridge, admitted that while the university's "vision is attractive... the Melbourne Model rhetorically espouses flexibility, (but) so far it has often been experienced as inflexible. Some students have begun to think of it as a strategy to disguise retrenchment and diminution."

University of Melbourne Creative Arts student, Rosalie Delaney, claimed the university was censoring students' artworks critical of the Melbourne's new teaching model, saying universities should "be a bastion of free speech and critical thought and questioning of structures and authority", describing their alleged actions as "appalling"; actions which the university administration deny."

University of Melbourne Creative Arts group, Crunch, produced Melbourne Model: The Musical, a humorous critique of the university's restructuring of the arts faculty, where Vice-Chancellor Davis is depicted as "a nymphomaniac rock star", who eventually relocates to Canberra, thus abandoning the university, alluding to Davis' close relationship with Labor Prime Minister, Kevin Rudd. Fregmonto Stokes, the musical's writer, was inspired by what he described as "the cutting of a significant number of subjects for economic reasons". The musical was the last production for the 15-year-old arts group Crunch which was wound up by the end of 2008 due to University of Melbourne's cuts to the arts faculty. On retirement in 2018, Davis did indeed move to ANU.

Victorian College of the Arts student, Chloe Greaves, complained to the Victorian College of the Arts Faculty Board that there was confusion and resentment amongst the student body around the Melbourne Model and merger of the arts college with the University of Melbourne. She criticised the lack of student consultation, citing an article in The Age as the first many students had heard of any changes to the curriculum.

Prospective high school graduate students also expressed criticism of the University of Melbourne, seeing the Melbourne Model as "a grab for cash" or "a shameless bid to make university careers longer and win lucrative fees from overseas students and wealthy locals." One year 12 student was reported as saying: "Far from offering students a genuine choice, this model dictates that we must now study an extra two or three years, whether we want to or not."

=== Other ===
Victorian Association of State Secondary Principals' President, Brian Burgess, charged the University of Melbourne with "elitism" and put forward that the number of students who would have access to the university's courses would be minimal and for those that could, the courses would take longer than normal.

Corporate lawyer and company director, Adam Schwab, linked the University of Melbourne's move to a postgraduate emphasis and the newly elected Labor Government's plan to scrap full fee paying places for domestic students in 2009 being "remarkably well timed", also insinuating a close relationship between Vice-Chancellor Davis and the Labor Government.

== See also ==
- Bologna Process
- Bologna declaration
