= Jim Percy =

Australian socialist

Jim Percy (1948 – 12 October 1992 in Sydney, New South Wales, Australia), was a founder of the Socialist Workers League of Australia, later called the Socialist Workers Party and the Democratic Socialist Party, and served as national secretary for almost twenty years.

== Career ==
Percy first became active in politics as a high-school student in 1965, helping organize demonstrations against the Vietnam War.

In 1967 he helped to found the Socialist youth organisation Resistance, based on members of the Sydney University Socialist Club and the Vietnam Action Campaign.

In 1969, Percy was elected to the initial five-member secretariat of the Vietnam Moratorium Campaign in Sydney.

In 1972, he became a founder of the Socialist Workers League. He became the League's Organisation Secretary in 1972 and its National Secretary in 1973. Due to the influence of the US Socialist Workers Party, the SWL later took the name Socialist Workers Party, and Percy continued as secretary. The SWP later became the Democratic Socialist Party. That group now has two descendants, the Democratic Socialist Perspective, a tendency within Socialist Alliance, and the Revolutionary Socialist Party.

Percy was central to the DSP becoming an Australia-wide party during the 1970s. In the 1980s, he oversaw a series of attempts by the party to reach out to new forces and to regroup with other far-left organisations.

He died of cancer on 12 October 1992, at the age of forty-three.
