= Democratic Socialist Perspective =

Defunct Marxist group in Australia

- Leader: Peter Boyle
- Founded: 1972
- Dissolved: 2010
- Merged into: Socialist Alliance
- Headquarters: Sydney
- Ideology: Socialism; Historical: Trotskyism
- Political position: Left-wing to far-left
- International affiliation: Fourth International

Website
- www.dsp.org.au

The Democratic Socialist Perspective (DSP) was an Australian socialist political group. It was founded in 1972 as the Socialist Workers League (SWL), changing its name to the Socialist Workers Party (SWP) a few years later. In the early 1990s it was once again renamed, as the Democratic Socialist Party, and in 2003 it became the Democratic Socialist Perspective.

The DSP operated as the largest component of a broad-left socialist formation, the Socialist Alliance, until in 2010, it voted to merge into the Socialist Alliance.

== History ==
=== Formation ===
The DSP started as the orthodox Trotskyist Socialist Workers League (SWL), founded in 1972 by members of the radical Socialist Youth Alliance (previously, and also currently, called Resistance) which grew out of the student radicalisation surrounding Australian involvement in the Vietnam War. Separate to this, the Labor Action Group formed in Brisbane. Led by John and Sue McCarthy (who had recently returned after working with the International Marxist Group in England) and Di and Larry Zetlin, it fused with the SWL at the SWL founding conference in January 1972. The SWL affiliated to the reunified Fourth International, under the influence of the American section, the Socialist Workers Party. It was also undoubtedly due to this influence that the SWL itself took the name Socialist Workers Party (SWP).

The unity between the former Labor Action Group members and their supporters in other states (generally seen as supporters of the European-based International Majority Tendency of the Fourth International) within the SWL and the majority of the SWL, which supported the positions of the minority faction within the Fourth International, known as the Leninist Trotskyist Faction, was short-lived. A minority of SWL/Socialist Youth Alliance members split in August 1972 and went on to form the Communist League as a national organisation.

The Communist League in Australia was co-founded by Queensland doctor John McCarthy (1948–2008), who later played a major role in integrating the CL and the SWP. Author Peter Robb was the second main driving force, and helped to produce its newspaper, Militant. Activist and later academic Marcia Langton was the third member of the CL committee. McCarthy broke away from the SWP (then Socialist Workers League) to create CL, and then, along with Robb and Langton, rejoined the SWP four years later, in November 1976.

Both the Socialist Workers League and the Communist League were recognised as sympathising organisations of the Fourth International in Australia, a situation which remained until the two groups re-united as the Socialist Workers Party in January 1978.

=== Abandonment of Trotskyism ===
In 1986 the American SWP broke with orthodox Trotskyism and disaffiliated from the Fourth International. While maintaining Leon Trotsky's critique of the USSR, the party replaced Trotsky's theory of permanent revolution with the view that socialist revolution in Third World countries (countries in which, according to Marxist theory, the development of capitalism has been distorted by colonialism and imperialism) will take place in two connected stages. The SWL followed suit. In the early 1990s it was renamed the Democratic Socialist Party. It contested the 1998 federal election as part of the Democratic Socialist Electoral League.

The Democratic Socialist Electoral League espoused a left-wing position on most issues, including privatisation, the environment, immigration and civil rights. The party also had a comprehensive preferencing arrangement, supporting the Greens and some other left-wing groups. It differentiated itself from the Greens by claiming that the latter had no clear economic policy. It supported Labor over the Liberal Party, and was particularly opposed to the rise of One Nation.

A smaller group of loyalists to the American SWP split from the DSP and use the name Communist League to the present day. In 2022, Communist League members from throughout Australia and New Zealand relocated to Sydney to consolidate the organization.

=== Socialist Alliance ===
In 2001, the DSP, along with several other socialist parties including the International Socialist Organisation, formed the Socialist Alliance, initially an electoral vehicle. In 2002 the DSP championed the idea of turning Socialist Alliance into more of a party formation, although at first it had to withdraw this proposal as the ISO's opposition threatened to destroy the alliance. In 2003 the DSP became the first (and so far only) Socialist Alliance affiliate to become an internal tendency within the Alliance, changing its name to the Democratic Socialist Perspective, in line with its view that SA should become a "Multi-Tendency Socialist Party", a view that the May 2003 National Conference of the Socialist Alliance subsequently adopted.

Each of these changes of name and tactics has been accompanied, like in many far-left groups, with a turnover of members. While the SWP and DSP recruited many activists from the radical student movement of the 1970s and from various social movements since, it failed to retain most of them for long as the sixties and seventies radicalisation wave has receded. Nonetheless, the DSP has retained a core membership drawn from each upsurge of political struggle, some of whom are founding members of the party back in 1972. The SWP, and then DSP, was led by Jim Percy as National Secretary from 1972 until his death in 1992.

The Socialist Alliance had been created in alliance with other forces in the hopes of using joint electoral work amongst Australian socialists to increase trust and collaboration between socialists, and in the process making socialist organisation a more attractive option to the left. But although it contested the 2001 federal election and the 2004 federal election, as well as several state elections, it has failed to attract significant support. The Socialist Alliance has had two electoral successes, electing Sam Wainwright to Fremantle City Council in 2009 and Sue Bolton to Moreland City Council in 2012.

A debate broke out in the DSP in 2005 about its Socialist Alliance orientation but the minority viewpoint that opposed continuing with the Alliance orientation was soundly defeated at the DSP's January 2008 congress. This caused a split, after the opposition was expelled subsequently forming a new organisation the same year, the Revolutionary Socialist Party.

In October 2009, the DSP National Committee proposed that the organisation merge itself into the Socialist Alliance. At the DSP National Congress in January 2010, the membership voted to go ahead with the merger.

== Notable members ==
- Russel Norman – New Zealand former Green Party leader (2006–2015)
- Paul Howes – Australian National Secretary of the Australian Workers' Union (2007–2014)
