= Andrea Hull =

Australian academic (born 1949)

Andrea Douglas Hull AO (born 13 March 1949) is an Australian academic, and was appointed the Director of the Victorian College of the Arts (VCA) in 1995, the college's longest standing director. Hull announced her retirement to commence in March 2009 "to pursue other interests" despite the University of Melbourne music faculty board's decision to abolish the VCA's name as part of a restructure. VCA became a faculty of the university in 2007.

Hull came under much scrutiny from the Victorian College of the Arts Student Union (VCASU) during her tenure as director, particularly during the implementation of the controversial Melbourne Model.

Hull was also a board member of Breast Cancer Network Australia, the peak national organisation for Australians affected by breast cancer from 2008 to 2015. She was a member of the Australian Broadcasting Corporation's Advisory Council from December 2014 to December 2019.

Hull was appointed an Officer of the Order of Australia in the 2003 Queen's Birthday Honours for "service to the arts, to arts education, and to policy development, particularly through improving community access and involvement in cultural pursuits".
