= Red Flag (newspaper) =

Australian newspaper

- "A world to win"
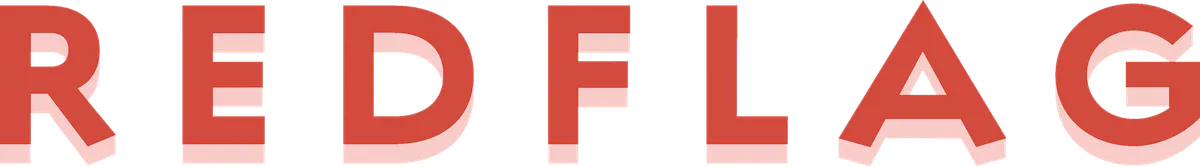
- Type: Newspaper
- Owner: Socialist Alternative
- Publisher: Red Flag Press Inc.
- Founded: 12 June 2013; 13 years ago
- Language: English
- Headquarters: Trades Hall; 54 Victoria St; Carlton South; Victoria 3053
- City: Melbourne
- Country: Australia
- ISSN: 2202-2228
- Website: redflag.org.au

Red Flag is an Australian newspaper which is published fortnightly by the Trotskyist organisation Socialist Alternative. It is also associated with the podcast Red Flag Radio.

== History ==
The first issue of Red Flag was published on 12 June 2013.

In July 2014, the newspaper was criticised after publishing an issue featured a front page depicting then Prime Minister of Australia Tony Abbott with a razor to his neck and the caption "One cut we'd like to see", in protest of the Abbott government's proposed budget cuts. In an interview, Abbott stated that the image "should not have any place in our public discourse". The editors refused to apologise and defended the cover as an homage to a 1977 poster and political slogan "Give Fraser the razor!", while accusing critics of hypocrisy for defending Abbott from a "clearly metaphorical" threat at the same time as his government was deporting refugees to face real threats of violence. They nonetheless withdrew the edition due to "legal concerns".

In 2019, Red Flag editor Ben Hillier's articles provided on-the-ground coverage of the siege and student rebellions at Hong Kong Polytechnic. Hillier's eyewitness account has been documented in his book, The Art of Rebellion: Dispatches from Hong Kong.
