= Victorian College of the Arts Student Union =

Student organisation in Melbourne, Australia

The Victorian College of the Arts Student Union (VCASU) was the student union of the former Victorian College of the Arts (VCA), now known as the Faculty of VCA and Music (VCAM) in Melbourne, Australia. It was a separately incorporated organisation which represented the VCA student body. It had a strong history of creative student activism and successful political campaigns. VCASU's student newspaper was called Spark. VCASU officially went into voluntary liquidation on 15 May 2009 and shut down operations by 30 June 2009.

== The Melbourne Model ==
VCA became a faculty of the University of Melbourne (UoM) in 2007, which is in the stages of implementing the Melbourne Model at UoM. VCASU argued the new changes were aimed at cutting university courses, staff and services which UoM Vice-Chancellor Glyn Davis denied. Davis, the architect of the Melbourne Model had come under much criticism from staff and students alike.

UoM Provost Peter McPhee announced on 22 April 2008, that VCA's six separate schools of fine art, music, drama, dance, production and film and television would become three by 2009, while maintaining the six disciplines.

VCASU also argued that UoM was attempting to silence VCASU for its criticisms over the Melbourne Model in the wake of Voluntary student unionism introduced under the John Howard Government, by refusing to fund the organisation any further, which they foresaw forcing its closure. Despite this, VCASU achieved a 25% voluntary membership in 2007, with more than 50% of VCA students agreeing to join VCASU when enrolling online in both 2007 and 2008. Sue Pennicuik of the Greens raised concerns with the University of Melbourne Amendment Bill that prior to the amalgamation of VCA with the university, VCA students had their own student union which represented them in their particular way of studying, pointing out the difference between the practical way of studying the arts to how university students study.

== Campaign history ==
In 1998, VCASU stopped the introduction of Up Front Fees at the VCA by staging a tent city on administration lawns. In 2003 VCASU led a militant campaign to reinstate VCA sessional staff which were to lose their jobs due to a "budget deficit" according to VCA Director Andrea Hull. In 2004, VCASU were involved in the student occupations at VCA, RMIT University and Monash University against the Howard Government's increased HECS fees. Also in 2004 VCASU protested against the then Federal Minister for Education, Brendan Nelson while visiting the VCA campus by dressing as Grim Reapers and labeling him the "Minister for Higher Execution". In 2008 VCASU accused UoM of forcing the closure of their union, a charge the university denies. The union was also involved in protesting academic staff cuts in 2008 by attempting to disrupt a UoM council meeting.

== Proud ==
Proud was VCASU's annual acquisitive prize exhibition held for all VCASU members to participate. It had traditionally been held in the Margaret Lawrence Gallery at VCA. Beginning in 1996, Proud provided a launch pad for many of VCA's successful emerging artists, including Anastasia Klose, Van Thanh Rudd and Azlan McLennan. Previous Proud exhibitions included high-profile arts industry judges such as Marcus Westbury and Patricia Piccinini.
