= Refugee Action Collective (Victoria) =

Australian refugee rights group

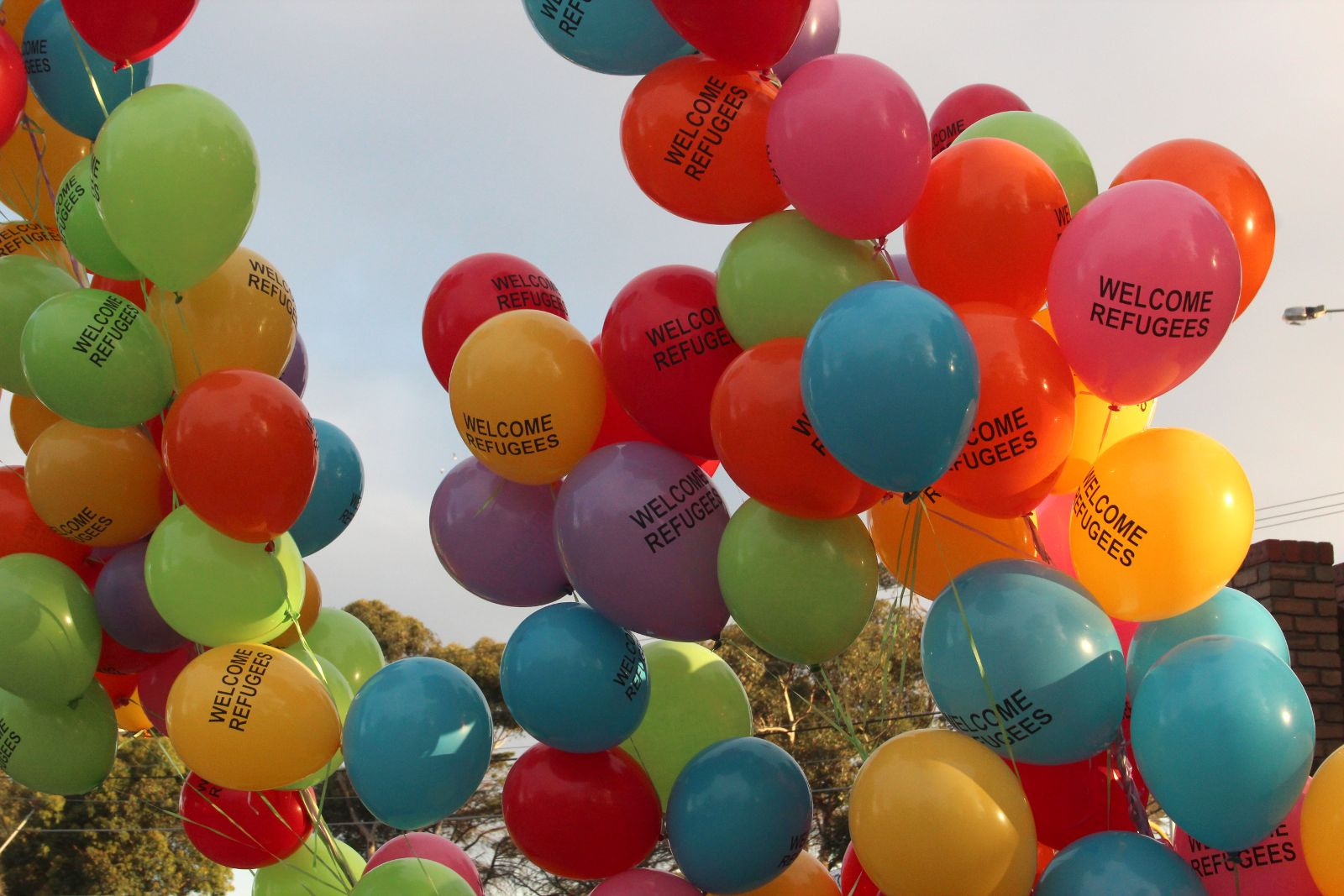
Balloons at a vigil organised by RAC in solidarity with refugees on hunger strike at the Broadmeadows immigration detention centre in Melbourne, 2012

Refugee Action Collective (Victoria), or RAC, are a grassroots group of activists concerned with refugee rights operating in Melbourne, Australia. RAC has organised around issues they deem inhumane by the Australian Government in relation to asylum seekers, such as organising protests and vigils as well as being involved in more militant action such as breaking out and hiding detainees.

== History ==
RAC was set up in late 2000 by a range of activists in response to the former Howard government's policies toward the mandatory detention of refugees and the issuing of temporary protection visas which they branded as racist. RAC activists were involved in breaking out detainees from the Woomera Detention Centre in 2002, protesting outside the Baxter Detention Centre in 2005 and protests against the Tampa incident of 2001, where 438 asylum seekers were denied entry into Australia by the government.

== Recent years ==
By 2009, RAC began focusing their attention on the Rudd-Gillard government's position on Tamil asylum seekers. In 2010, RAC were amongst a coalition of groups calling on the government to "end the freeze on asylum seeker claims" and opposing what they call "another Tampa election". The move followed the government's decision to freeze processing of all claims by asylum seekers from Afghanistan and Sri Lanka, and the re-opening of the Curtin Detention Centre. RAC also protested outside the Maribyrnong Detention Centre in 2010 after a Tamil detainee went on hunger strike after his refugee claim had been accepted but still awaits security clearance from the Australian Security Intelligence Organisation.

== Notable affiliate individuals and organisations ==
- Judith Bessant, Head of RMIT University Global Studies, Social Science and Planning Department
- Eve Bodsworth, former President of the University of Melbourne Student Union
- Chris Chaplin, State Secretary of the Australian Greens (Victoria)
- Tahir Cambis, filmmaker and activist
- Kate Davidson, former National Education Officer of the National Union of Students
- Judy McVey, of Solidarity
- Michal Morris, of the Ethnic Communities' Council of Victoria
- Michele O'Neil, Secretary of the Textile, Clothing and Footwear Union (Victorian Branch) and Vice-President of the Victorian Trades Hall Council
- Brian Pound, Secretary of the Media, Entertainment and Arts Alliance (Victorian Branch)
- Nabil Sulaiman, of the Australian Arabic Council
- Fleur Taylor, of Socialist Alternative
