= Socialist Alternative (Australia) =

Political organisation in Australia

- Abbreviation: SA, SAlt, SocAlt
- Founded: 1995; 31 years ago
- Split from: International Socialist Organisation
- Headquarters: Melbourne, Victoria
- Newspaper: Red Flag
- Membership: ~800
- Ideology: Revolutionary socialism Anti-capitalism; Trotskyism

Website
- sa.org.au redflag.org.au

Socialist Alternative (SA, SAlt, or SocAlt) is a socialist political organisation in Australia. Its members have organised numerous campaigns and protests around economic justice, LGBT rights, climate change, racism, refugee rights and support for the end of the genocide in Palestine. The organisation is also involved in the trade union and student union movements. It has branches and student clubs in most major Australian cities and publishes the fortnightly newspaper Red Flag. Members of Socialist Alternative are sometimes referred to as Trotskyists.

Socialist Alternative organises the annual Marxism Conference in Melbourne, a public event featuring discussions on radical history, revolutionary theory, and anti-capitalist politics.

In 2018, Socialist Alternative helped to establish the Victorian Socialists, an electoral project to win federal, state, and local council positions for socialist candidates in the state of Victoria.

== History ==
Socialist Alternative was established in 1995 by ex-members of the former International Socialist Organisation (ISO) in Melbourne, Australia, including Mick Armstrong. Following debates over the orientation of the ISO to the Australian political situation, the members were expelled for arguing that the ISO held "overblown" expectations of the 1990s combined with "a super-inflated estimation" of its capabilities. This was part of the debate internationally within the International Socialist Tendency over the nature of the contemporary political situation and how socialists should respond, with the leading organisation in the Tendency, the British Socialist Workers Party arguing that the 1990s were like "the 1930s in slow motion". Like in Australia, splits occurred within the IST in other countries, including New Zealand, Greece, Germany, Canada, South Africa and France. In addition to splits, the International Socialist Organization in the United States were expelled from the IST.

Socialist Alternative has links with several other groups previously part of the IST, such as the ISO in America, the Internationalist Workers' Left in Greece, Socialisme International in France, and Socialist Aotearoa and the International Socialist Organisation in New Zealand. Since 2013, Socialist Alternative has maintained permanent observer status within the United Secretariat of the Fourth International, a worldwide organisation of revolutionary Marxists.

Until 2003, Socialist Alternative was based primarily in Melbourne, when the organisation began establishing branches in other Australian cities following a surge of growth out of the S11 protests against the 2000 World Economic Forum meeting in Melbourne.

Socialist Alternative was invited to join the Socialist Alliance in 2001. The Alliance grouped the Democratic Socialist Perspective (DSP), the ISO, and other Australian far-left groups and individuals. Socialist Alternative eventually declined to join due to the Socialist Alliance's strong emphasis on running in parliamentary elections. Socialist Alternative saw this parliamentary emphasis in the flat political climate as a restriction to building activism on the ground and representing a turn towards reformist politics. Socialist Alternative entered into unity discussions with the Revolutionary Socialist Party (RSP), which had been expelled from the DSP in 2008. This merger proposal prompted the Socialist Alliance to reopen unity discussions with Socialist Alternative. On 28 March 2013, the RSP voted unanimously to merge with Socialist Alternative.

=== Elections ===
Socialist Alternative maintains that parliamentary elections are not the key to social change. However, it does not reject voting in elections outright and sees elections reflecting the state of mass political consciousness. Therefore, the organisation promotes whom it votes for and whom it believes the left should support during election periods, for example, calling for the left to unite around SYRIZA in the 2012 Greek legislative election.

From 2018 onwards, Socialist Alternative has been engaged in Victorian Socialists. Victorian Socialists started as an electoral alliance with Socialist Alliance and some independent socialists, but in 2020 Socialist Alliance withdrew.

== Campaigns ==
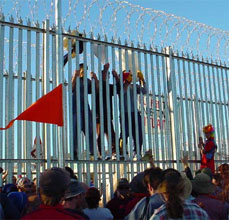
As a participant in the Refugee Action Collective, Socialist Alternative took part in the 2002 protest at the Woomera Detention Centre in which several refugees, with the aid of demonstrators outside, tore down the facility's fences and broke out.

Socialist Alternative has been involved in organising within anti-war campaign groups such as the Stop the War Coalition and has participated in demonstrations across the country, including the protests against the 2011 Commonwealth Heads of Government Meeting, the 2008–2009 war on Gaza, the 2007 APEC Conference, the 2006 G20 Summit, the 2006 war on Lebanon, the wars on Iraq and Afghanistan, and have been involved in the Boycott, Divestment and Sanctions campaign and solidarity actions with the Arab Spring.

Since 2004, the Socialist Alternative has participated in the Equal Love campaign – the main campaign group that advocates marriage equality in the country. Many Socialist Alternative members have been elected as National Union of Students Queer Officers and have used this position to promote Equal Love and attack the Rudd-Gillard Government for not repealing John Howard's ban on same-sex marriage. Several Socialist Alternative members are notable for their same-sex marriage activism. Member Roz Ward co-founded the Safe Schools Coalition Australia, the organisation that organised the Safe Schools Program.

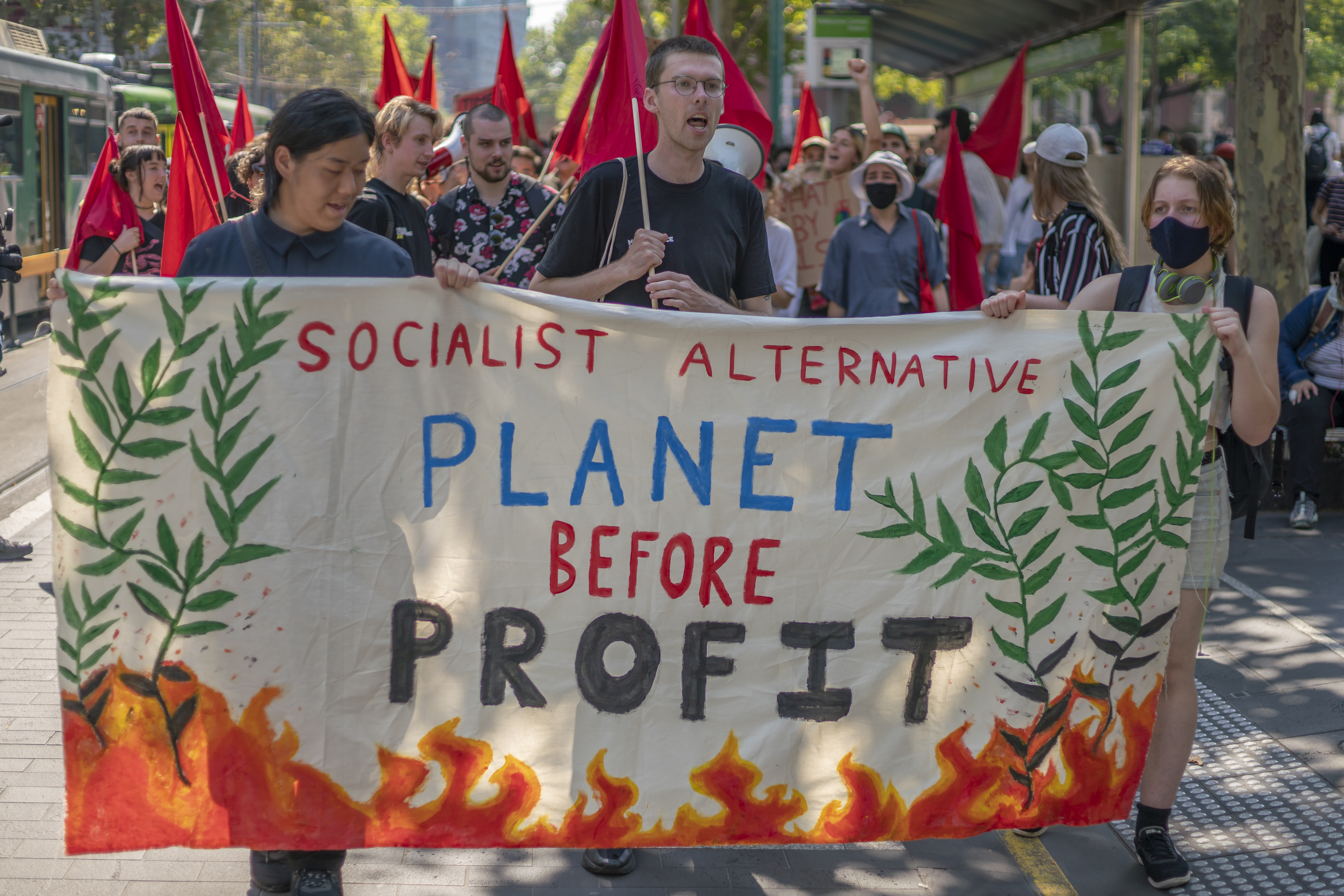
Socialist Alternative banner at the Global Climate Strike 2021 in Melbourne, Australia

In early 2009, Socialist Alternative established Students for Palestine, and supported the group's campus activity, including the protests against the 2010 Gaza flotilla raid and helping fundraise for the Viva Palestina 5. In 2011, Socialist Alternative members were among 19 arrested in a Melbourne demonstration targeting Israeli-owned chocolate chain Max Brenner for its donations to the Israeli Defence Forces, as part of the international Boycott, Divestment and Sanctions campaign supporting Palestinians against the state of Israel. SA has been called anti-Semitic by the Australasian Union of Jewish Students for its rhetoric and protest techniques. SA maintains that Israel does not represent Jews but only claims to do so, and argues that their group takes "a firm stand against all forms of racism, including anti-Semitism".

Socialist Alternative has been involved in the campaign for refugee rights, building campaigns to mobilise opposition to the policies of mandatory detention and offshore processing. In 2002 they built the protests against detention centre at Woomera, which led to a mass break-out of refugees. Since the election of the Rudd-Gillard Labor government in 2007, they have continued to organise and campaign around the issue.

== Membership routine ==
Socialist Alternative has branches in Melbourne, Sydney, Brisbane, Canberra, Perth, Adelaide and Wollongong – branch members attend weekly meetings. In Melbourne, the group has been based at Victorian Trades Hall. SA advertises public meetings through leafleting on street stalls, campuses, at demonstrations, and through bill posters.

The group also hosts the annual Marxism Conference, a public event featuring discussions on radical history, revolutionary theory and anti-capitalist politics. It is the largest event of its kind in Australia.

=== Student activism ===
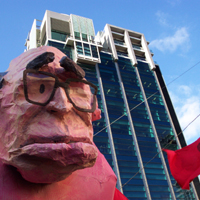
Members of Socialist Alternative assisted in the construction of this effigy of former Prime Minister John Howard, made by the Victorian College of the Arts Student Union. The building in the background is RMIT University, occupied during a demonstration against education cuts in 2005.

Socialist Alternative maintains student clubs at many universities around Australia, and their political work often emphasises student-based campaigns. The group is involved in organising student protest actions around several issues which often draw national attention, such as a stunt during a 2014 episode of Q&A demonstrating opposition to government plans for increased higher education fees, the large nationwide protests in response to the 2019–20 Australian bushfire crisis, or a protest against former Liberal Party Prime Minister Malcolm Turnbull.

Socialist Alternative participates in campus student union elections and the National Union of Students as a faction and claims to be the largest to the left of the National Labor Students. As revolutionary socialists, the group opposes both the Liberal and Labor parties. It has come under attack from a range of factions in student politics, including Liberal students, both Left and Right Labor students and claims to have been slandered by the Australasian Union of Jewish Students for its strong support for the Palestinian liberation struggle and consequent opposition to the state of Israel.

Socialist Alternative was deregistered as an official club by the Monash Student Association in September 2014, cutting them off from student union funding. The student association deregistered Socialist Alternative because of accusations that it had discriminated against Jews at one of its campus meetings. Socialist Alternative said Jews were welcome at the pro-Palestinian meeting and the event's main speaker was Jewish. It said a particular group of students were denied entry after they refused to sign a petition calling for an end to Israel's economic blockade of Gaza, and had attempted to disrupt the meeting. This occurred in the aftermath of a campus meeting held by SA in support of Palestinians struggling against the Israeli military's Operation Protective Edge. Socialist Alternative argued that similar meetings took place at other campuses in Australia, at a time when several Australian student unions were passing motions "condemning Israeli war crimes and occupation" and large demonstrations were being held in support of Palestine. Academics around Australia signed an open letter opposing the deregistration of the Monash club as "the most serious attack yet in a nationwide campaign to stifle free speech on university campuses".

=== Trade unionism ===
Members of Socialist Alternative who are employed are politically active within the trade union appropriate for their industry. Socialist Alternative's members are active in trade unions, including the National Tertiary Education Union, in which lecturer and Socialist Alternative member Liam Ward was elected to the RMIT University Branch Committee as part of a left-wing oppositional ticket that replaced the previously established union leadership in 2010.

Socialist Alternative rejects the practice of forming separate 'red unions', arguing that such projects isolate socialists from the organised working class and are premised on a top-down method of artificially substituting a radical union leadership for the rank and file, instead arguing for activists to rebuild rank and file organisation within existing unions irrespective of their conservative leadership. In 2010, Socialist Alternative member and Queensland Shop, Distributive and Allied Employees Association delegate Duncan Hart organised supporters of same-sex marriage within the union in a rank-and-file challenge against the socially conservative SDA leader Joe de Bruyn.

== Theory ==
Though one of Socialist Alternative's stated aims is to contribute towards building a revolutionary party that can intervene in – and lead – mass working-class struggles, they do not consider themselves a political party at their current size and influence. Originating in the political tradition of the International Socialist Tendency, Socialist Alternative defend the position that a socialist revolution can only come about through "workers taking control of their workplaces, dismantling existing state institutions (parliaments, courts, the armed forces and police) and replacing them with an entirely new state based on genuinely democratic control by the working class". Describing itself as a "propaganda group" at its current size, Socialist Alternative attempts to relate to its audience primarily on the level of ideas, rather than seeing itself as a party that can be capable of leading mass struggles. While Socialist Alternative supports existing trade unions as essential components of workers' struggles, it believes that capitalism can only be successfully overthrown if a revolutionary party is built to challenge the hold of the ALP and the trade union bureaucracy over the working class, in conjunction with similar parties internationally.

In 2012, the Police Federation of Australia demanded that the Victorian Trades Hall Council cancel a Socialist Alternative public forum on "police racism and violence", as Trades Hall was where the meeting was to take place. The Council complied with the Police Federation's request; however, the meeting went ahead after several people turned up for the meeting and occupied the Trades Hall foyer, causing the Police Federation to split from the Council.

Socialist Alternative sees Russia's October 1917 Bolshevik revolution as a genuine socialist revolution. However, it asserts that the following "imperialist" attack on the country and the failure of the revolution to spread to Western Europe led to its ultimate defeat by Stalin's "counter-revolution".

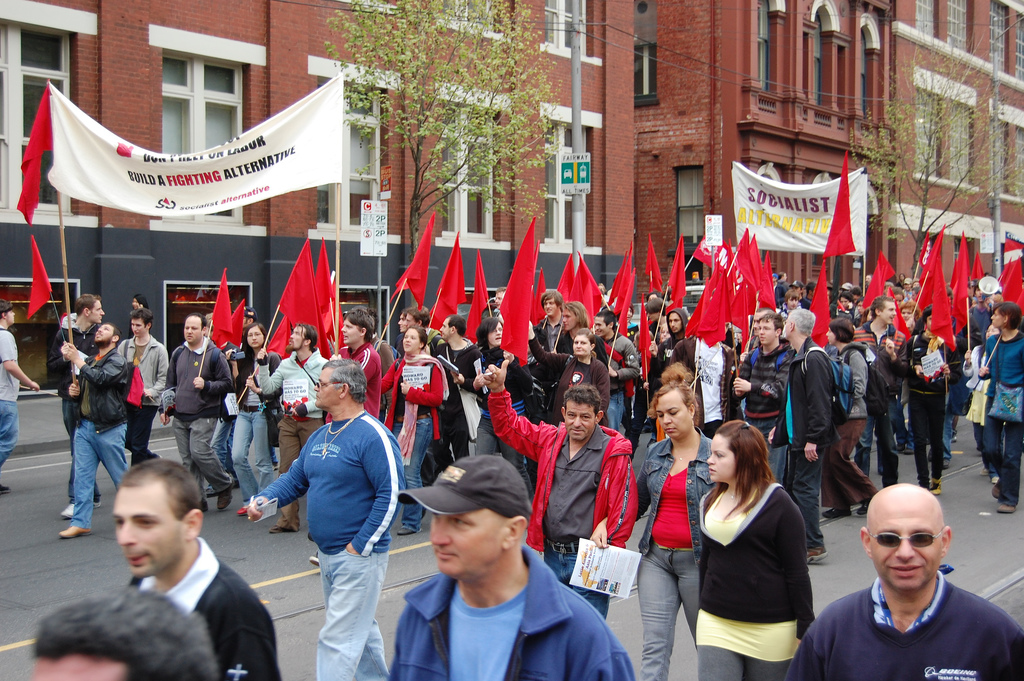
Socialist Alternative's red bloc contingent at an anti-WorkChoices demonstration in Melbourne, shortly before the federal election in 2007

== Publications ==
From 2009 to 2011, members of the organisation edited the annual online theoretical journal Marxist Interventions (MI). The overall aim of MI was to make Australian Marxist writings more readily accessible to audiences.

In 2010, the organisation launched a biannual theoretical journal, Marxist Left Review, edited by Sandra Bloodworth. The journal aims to "engage with theoretical and political debates on the Australian and international left".

== See also ==
- Socialism in Australia
- Victorian Socialists – an electoral alliance formed by Socialist Alternative and others on the Melbourne left
- Equal Love
- Refugee Action Collective
- Stop the War Coalition
