= Sydney University Labor Club =

Sydney University Labor Club banner

The Sydney University Labor Club is the oldest political society in Australia. It is one of the most influential Australian university political societies. Many of the club's alumni have gone on to prominent political careers. The club is associated with the left of the Australian Labor Party.

== History ==
In early 1925, a Labor group began orienting around University of Sydney Union debate nights. It was in April, though, that the club was officially formed, with a visit to Sydney University by a son of Ramsay MacDonald; the club usurped an official Union dinner to host the visiting party first. H.V. Evatt was the inaugural president of the club, which soon ceased to function after a 1927 split within the New South Wales Labor Party between Jack Lang and Peter Loughlin. In 1931, the club was reformed and it affiliated to the Labor Party, sending one delegate to its state conference. Problems arose again with the figure of Lang. Disaffiliation followed in 1934 and the club renamed itself the 'Socialist Club'. The club's 1939 constitution was written by future governor-general John Kerr.

In 1940, the club came under the control of the Hughes-Evans executive of the state party, and in 1944 followed the State Labor Party into the Communist Party. In 1949, students wary of communist influence split to form the ALP Club, which was more closely aligned with the Labor Party. It exists today as the official body of Young Labor Left at the University, and is controlled by the party's Soft Left faction.

The club has been involved in both activist struggles and more institutional means of achieving change. Its members were prominent in the Freedom Rides, anti-Vietnam War protests, and the establishment of the Department of Political Economy in the 1960s and 1970s. From 1965, club members organised over 100 branches of High School Students Against the War in Vietnam in Sydney high schools. In late 1965, the club briefly changed its name to the 'Socialist Club' before returning to the original name in 1968. The communists retained control until the annual general meeting on 29 March 1966, when New Left Labor activists, including Jennie George, Sandra Levy, and Jim Percy, were elected in a 19-14 vote.

In early 1969, the club set up a shopfront at 67 Glebe Point Road in Glebe to coordinate its anti-Vietnam War activities.

The club had a strong presence in Sydney University student politics in the new millennium, with every president of the Students' Representative Council from 2001 to 2013 being a member. Its influence in campus politics has declined dramatically. Only 5 of 33 student councillors elected at the 2016 elections came from the club. The club now intentionally avoids campus politics, using the slogan "Real politics, not student politics" on some of its materials. The club continues to participate in activism as a part of Young Labor Left.

From 2013 the Club was rocked by internal strife over political direction, with part of National Labor Students, the university Labor Left faction, leaving to establish a new grouping in Sydney Labor Students (now the Socialist Labor Society). A splinter club, the Young Workers' Club, formed in 2016 but ran for only one year because of low membership, with the Union deregistering it because of inactivity. More recently, the club has stabilised and become more active, and is associated with Young Labor Left.

== Notable alumni ==
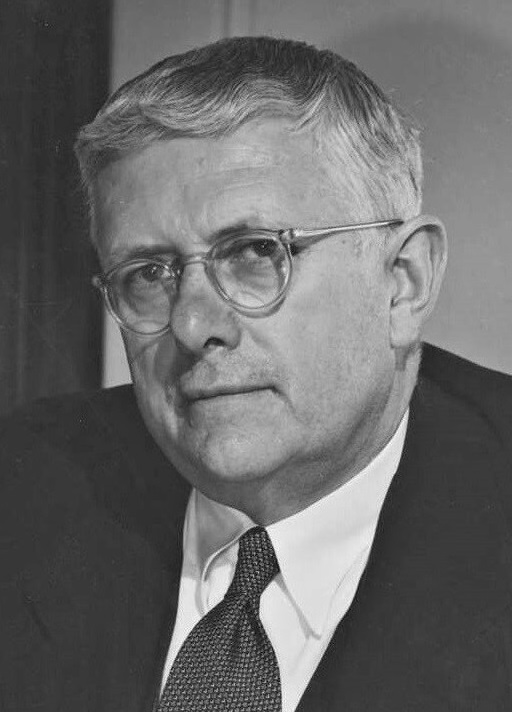
Club founder H.V. Evatt

- H.V. Evatt
- John Kerr
- Gough Whitlam
- Anthony Albanese
- Verity Firth
- Jenny McAllister
- James Spigelman
- Andrew Leigh
- Daryl Melham
- Jeff Shaw (politician)
- Dick Klugman
- Laurie Ferguson
- Tony Burke
- Bob Ellicott
- Charles Firth
- Adam Searle
- Sholto Macpherson
- Joseph Ormond Aloysius Bourke
- Andrew West (journalist)
- Reba Meagher
- Hall Greenland
- Rose Jackson
- James Carleton
