= Farrago (magazine) =

Student publication for the University of Melbourne in Melbourne, Australia

- Issue 8 2016, front cover
- Type: Student publication
- Format: Magazine
- Owner: University of Melbourne Student Union
- Editor: Maria Carolina Lourenco Quartel, Ruby Weir-Alarcon, Sabine Pentecost, Felicity Bayne
- Founded: 1925
- Language: English
- Headquarters: Parkville, Victoria, Australia
- Website: farragomagazine.com

Farrago is the student publication for the University of Melbourne in Melbourne, Australia published by the University of Melbourne Student Union. It is the oldest student publication in Australia. It was first published on 3 April 1925.

== Name ==
The term "farrago", from Latin 'mixed cattle fodder', means a confused variety of miscellaneous things. It has been used by Edward Tylor in his book Primitive Culture. The name is included in the motto (drawn originally from the Satires of Juvenal) Quidquid agunt homines nostri farrago libelli est – "whatever men do forms the motley subject of our page" which was written on the first issue of the famous eighteenth-century periodical Tatler.

== History ==
The publication was founded in 1925 by Randal Heymanson, who was the first editor, and Brian Fitzpatrick, who was the first chief of staff.

For a number of years, Farrago was published in a newspaper or broadsheet format. In the 2000s, Farrago switched to a magazine format, which it continues to use today.

In 2025, Farrago celebrated its 100th anniversary alongside the University's ALP and Liberal Clubs. On 11 September 2025, a centenary gala was held at the Victorian Trades Hall to mark Farrago's 100th anniversary, with over 160 attendees, including Farrago alumni. The publication also hosted an exhibition at the George Paton Gallery called ‘Farrago 100: Showcasing a Century of Student Media’.

== Organisation ==
Up to four editors are elected annually and hold the shared title of Media Officer at the University of Melbourne Student Union, with the union secretary being the legally defined publisher. The editorship has been highly politicised in the past, and election campaigns are vigorous.

Archives of Farrago are available at the Student Union's Rowden White Library and the University of Melbourne's Baillieu Library.

Noteworthy past editors include Cyril Pearl, Geoffrey Blainey, Amirah Gust, Claude Forell, Ian Robinson, Morag Fraser, Henry Rosenbloom, Garrie Hutchinson, Ross McPherson, Colin Golvan, Lindsay Tanner, Peter Russo, Louise Carbines, Jim Brumby, Pete Steedman, Arnold Zable, Kate Legge, Nicola Gobbo, Cathy Bale, Christos Tsiolkas, and Nam Le.

=== Voluntary student unionism ===
The implementation of voluntary student unionism in 2006 had a significant impact on the viability of student publications across Australia, as compulsory student union membership fees had been the major source of income for most. "Christos Tsiolkas was editor in 1987, and he had a budget of $280,000; we have a budget of $58,000, and $55,000 of that will go on printing. We're quite lucky, we're a well-funded institution, and the University has provided transitional funding", said Farrago editor for 2009.

== Aims and content ==
Farrago is a magazine whose content is produced and edited entirely by students, which aims to be a voice, creative outlet and source of information for those who attend the University of Melbourne – irrespective of age, course and interests. Farrago encourages contributions from students in both written and/or visual forms, because without these it would not be an accurate representation of students at the university.

Farrago contains the following sections: News, Non-Fiction, Creative. It previously contained a Science section, which was discontinued in recent years. Farrago also features regular columns from several student writers.

== Current and past editors ==
| Year | Name | Ticket |
|---|---|---|
| 1925 | S. H. Heymason | |
| 1925 | Brian Fitzpatrick (Chief of Staff) | |
| 1926 | Brian Fitzpatrick | |
| 1926 | R. B. Fraser | |
| 1926 | C. Wesley Haack | |
| 1926 | Lyle J. Byrne | |
| 1927 | C. Wesley Haack | |
| 1927 | Lyle J. Byrne | |
| 1927 | S. Paterson Grounds | |
| 1928 | A. J. M. Davies | |
| 1928 | F. R. Nelson | |
| 1929 | G. D. Seekamp | |
| 1929 | R. T. E. Latham | |
| 1946 | Portia Ferguson, Arthur Watson, Abner Shavitsky | |
| 1964 | John Helmer | |
| 1973 | Simon Marginson | |
| 1974 | Stephen Mills | |
| 1975 | Richard Cooney, Rob Nowak, Imre Salusinszky and Sandy Thomas. | |
| 1976 | Colin Golvan and Campbell Smith | |
| 1977 | Lindsay Tanner | Unknown |
| 1977 | Peter Russ | Unknown |
| 1978 | Mick Earls and Andrew Liston | Independent |
| 1979 | Louise Carbines and Jim Brumby | Independent |
| 1980 | Kate Legge and Nic McLellan | Independent |
| 1982 | Simon Bailey and Sara White | Independent |
| 1983 | Kathy Bail, John O'Hagan, Bruce Permezel | Independent |
| 1987 | Christos Tsiolkas | Unknown |
| 1989 | Katt Fetgers | |
| 1989 | Matt Healy | |
| 1989 | Megan Nicholson | |
| 1989 | Prue Walker | |
| 1990 | Kylie Hansen | |
| 1990 | Elise Mooney | |
| 1990 | Keir Semmens | |
| 1990 | Tim Richardson | |
| 1991 | Josie Ford | |
| 1991 | Chris Francis | |
| 1991 | Ande Bunbury | |
| 1991 | Tosca Looby | |
| 1992 | Cath Keaney | |
| 1992 | Kath Kenny | |
| 1992 | Felicity Lewis | |
| 1993 | Nicola Gobbo | |
| 1993 | Caroline Marks | |
| 1993 | Lizzie Glickfeld | |
| 1993 | Nadine Davidoff | |
| 1994 | Tim Growcott | |
| 1994 | Susan Luckman | |
| 1994 | Sean Smith | |
| 1994 | Lisa Shukroon | |
| 1995 | Misha Ketchell | |
| 1995 | Elisa Berg | |
| 1995 | Shaun O'Beirne | |
| 1995 | Elena Campbell | |
| 1996 | Martin Donald | |
| 1996 | Victoria Hannaford | |
| 1996 | Matthew Gingold | |
| 1996 | Emma Miller | |
| 1997 | Vanessa Sowerwine | |
| 1997 | Derek Agnew | |
| 1997 | Joe Hildebrand | |
| 1997 | Phip Murray | |
| 1998 | Clare Land | |
| 1998 | Julian Sempill | |
| 1998 | Aizura Hankin | |
| 1999 | Nam Le | |
| 1999 | Anna Rich | |
| 1999 | Nathan Lambert | |
| 1999 | Jade Forrester | |
| 2000 | Penny Savidis | |
| 2000 | Virginia Murdoch | |
| 2000 | Liz Hobday | |
| 2000 | Ben Moxham | |
| 2001 | Mark Cunningham | |
| 2001 | Ruby Nolan | |
| 2001 | Miki Perkins | |
| 2001 | Julian Drape | |
| 2002 | Michael Shipman | |
| 2002 | Alexandria Hicks | |
| 2002 | Angus Trewavas | |
| 2003 | Jacky Bailey | |
| 2003 | Ben Gook | |
| 2003 | Doug Hendrie | |
| 2003 | Michelle Scavone | |
| 2004 | Jessica Pitt | |
| 2004 | Jake Anson | |
| 2004 | Alon Casutto | |
| 2004 | Miranda Airey-Branson | |
| 2005 | Clare Chandler | Independent Media |
| 2005 | Zoe Holman | Independent Media |
| 2005 | Tom Rigby | Independent Media |
| 2005 | Jim Round | Independent Media |
| 2006 | Thomas Arup | |
| 2006 | David Fettling | |
| 2006 | Tamar Heath | |
| 2006 | Lara Picker | |
| 2007 | Jonathan Brent | Independent Media |
| 2007 | Jessica Friedmann | Independent Media |
| 2007 | Sebastian Strangio | Independent Media |
| 2007 | Gillian Terzis | Independent Media |
| 2008 | Zoë Barron | Independent Media |
| 2008 | Simon Lilburn | Independent Media |
| 2008 | Hagan Matthews | Independent Media |
| 2008 | Benjamin Riley | Independent Media |
| 2009 | Gillian Kilby | Independent Media |
| 2009 | Bhakthi Puvanenthiran | Independent Media |
| 2009 | Zoe Sanders | Independent Media |
| 2009 | Yoshua Wakeham | Independent Media |
| 2010 | Rachel Baxendale | Independent Media |
| 2010 | Sarah Laing | Independent Media |
| 2010 | Ellena Savage | Independent Media |
| 2010 | Lucas Smith | Independent Media |
| 2011 | Tim Forster | Independent Media |
| 2011 | Erin Handley | Independent Media |
| 2011 | Geir O'Rourke. | Independent Media |
| 2011 | Elizabeth Redman | Independent Media |
| 2012 | Max Denton | Independent Media |
| 2012 | Ella Dyson | Independent Media |
| 2012 | Vicky Smith | Independent Media |
| 2012 | Scott Whinfeld | Independent Media |
| 2013 | Emma Koehn | Independent Media |
| 2013 | Sarah McColl | Independent Media |
| 2013 | Meg Watson | Independent Media |
| 2013 | Sally Whyte | Independent Media |
| 2014 | Zoe Efron | Independent Media |
| 2014 | Kevin Hawkins | Independent Media |
| 2014 | Michelle See-Tho | Independent Media |
| 2014 | Sean Watson | Independent Media |
| 2015 | Maddy Cleeve Gerkens | Independent Media |
| 2015 | Martin Ditmann | Independent Media |
| 2015 | Lynley Eavis | Independent Media |
| 2015 | Simon Farley | Independent Media |
| 2016 | Danielle Bagnato | Independent Media |
| 2016 | Sebastian Dodds | Independent Media |
| 2016 | Baya Ou Yang | Independent Media |
| 2016 | Caleb Triscari | Independent Media |
| 2017 | Alexandra Alvaro | Independent Media |
| 2017 | Amie Green | Independent Media |
| 2017 | Mary Ntalianis | Independent Media |
| 2017 | James Macaronas | Independent Media |
| 2018 | Ashleigh Barraclough | Independent Media |
| 2018 | Esther Le Couteur | Independent Media |
| 2018 | Monique O'Rafferty | Independent Media |
| 2018 | Jesse Paris-Jourdan | Independent Media |
| 2019 | Katie Doherty | Independent Media |
| 2019 | Carolyn Huane | Independent Media |
| 2019 | Ruby Perryman | Independent Media |
| 2019 | Stephanie Zhang | Independent Media |
| 2020 | Bethany Cherry | Independent Media |
| 2020 | Amber Meyer | Independent Media |
| 2020 | Sarah Peters | Independent Media |
| 2020 | Tharidi Walimunige | Independent Media |
| 2021 | Ailish Hallinan | Independent Media |
| 2021 | Pavani Ambagahawattha | Independent Media |
| 2021 | Lauren Berry | Independent Media |
| 2022 | Joanna Guelas | Independent Media |
| 2022 | Nishtha Banavalikar | Independent Media |
| 2022 | Charlotte Waters | Independent Media |
| 2022 | Jasmine Pierce | Independent Media |
| 2023 | Josh Davis | Independent Media |
| 2023 | Carmen Chin | Independent Media |
| 2023 | Xiaole Zhan | Independent Media |
| 2023 | Weiting Chen | Independent Media |
| 2024 | Joel Duggan | Independent Media |
| 2024 | Kien-Ling Liem | Independent Media |
| 2024 | Jessica Fanwong | Independent Media |
| 2024 | Gunjan Ahluwalia | Independent Media |
| 2025 | Mathilda Stewart | Independent Media |
| 2025 | Ibrahim Muan Abdulla | Independent Media |
| 2025 | Sophie He | Independent Media |
| 2025 | Marcie Di Bartolomeo | Independent Media |
| 2026 | Maria Carolina Lourenco Quartel | Independent Media |
| 2026 | Chiaki Chng | Independent Media |
| 2026 | Ruby Weir-Alarcon | Independent Media |
| 2026 | Sabine Pentecost | Independent Media |

== The Fitzpatrick Awards ==
Every year, the Media Office holds the Fitzpatrick Awards ceremony to celebrate and acknowledge the publication's contributors and volunteers. The first annual Fitzpatrick Awards were held in 2009 at Dante's Emporium and Cafe in Fitzroy. The ceremony is named after the publication's first chief of staff, Brian Fitzpatrick.

== Related projects ==
In addition to editing Farrago, the University of Melbourne Student Union Media Officers oversee several related projects.

=== Above Water ===
Above Water is an annual creative writing anthology published in collaboration with the University of Melbourne Student Union's Creative Arts department. It publishes a variety of creative forms including fiction, poetry and creative non-fiction. The first edition was published in 2005.

Unlike Farrago, the contents of Above Water is selected via competition, with prizes for the winning entries.

In 2017, the publication received almost 300 submissions, of which 17 were selected for publication.

=== Radio Fodder ===
Radio Fodder is the University of Melbourne Student Union's student radio station, produced by the student union Media Officers and run by two station managers with 32 different shows running from 10am - 9pm Monday to Friday. The name is derived from the latin translation and originated from a discontinued section of Farrago titled "The Fodder".

=== Farrago Student Union Election Guide ===
According to the University of Melbourne Student Union's constitution, each year the Media Office is required to print a student union election guide containing the names and statements of all candidates in the student union elections.

In most previous years, the election guide has been included as a section in an edition of Farrago, sometimes appearing as a perforated, removable booklet. In 2017, the editors opted to print the guide as a separate booklet entirely, which was then slipped into editions of Farrago on stands around the University of Melbourne campus.

== Controversy ==
Despite the magazine's commitment to providing a voice to a diverse range of contributors regardless of political persuasion, the editorial partisanship of the publication has varied under different editors. Zoe Efron, one of Farrago's 2014 editors, noted that the front cover of a 1974 edition of Farrago consisted of an ad for the then-Labor Prime Minister Gough Whitlam. She also noted that overt partisanship was still visible more recently, with a late 2013 edition of Farrago featuring a cover illustration of Tony Abbott with the caption "WE'RE FUCKED".
