= Australian Muslim Civil Rights Advocacy Network =

Australian advocacy group

- Abbreviation: AMCRAN
- Formation: April 2004

The Australian Muslim Civil Rights Advocacy Network (AMCRAN) is an Australian advocacy group that was established in April 2004 after the arrest and detention of medical student Izhar ul-Haque in Sydney on terrorism related charges of attending a training camp in Pakistan. The organisation aims to prevent the erosion of the civil rights of all Australians, and to do this through providing a Muslim perspective in the civil rights debate. It engages in political lobbying and legislative reform, grassroots community education, collaboration with both Muslim and non-Muslim organisations on civil rights, and communication to wider Australian society through the media.

Co-convenors of the organisation include Dr Waleed Kadous, a computer scientist of Egyptian background; and Amir Butler, an author and engineer, as well as the executive director of the Australian Muslim Public Affairs Committee (AMPAC). AMCRAN joined the Civil Rights Network and other civil liberties organisations in campaigning against the powers of the Australian anti-terrorism legislation, 2004.

In July 2004 AMCRAN produced and distributed, in cooperation with the NSW Council for Civil Liberties, Terrorism Laws: ASIO, the Police and You. The Pamphlet provides advice to Muslims and the wider community on the impact of new Terrorism laws. A second edition of the booklet is being produced by AMCRAN and the University of Technology, Sydney Community Law Centre in 2007.

As part of its campaign against the Government's Terrorism laws, in September 2005 Agnes Chong of the Australian Muslim Civil Rights Advocacy Network voiced concern about legislation, which included proposals for police powers to detain suspects without charge for a fortnight. "We know of at least 18 people who have been questioned and detained under ASIO warrants," she said, also complaining about the secrecy involved in each case. "Do you want the same thing that is happening elsewhere in the world happening in Australia? … We are not going to stand for this. We have to use every legitimate means to prevent unjust laws …" she told a reporter for The Sydney Morning Herald.

When the federal government announced proposals in September 2005 to introduce tough new laws prohibiting the "incitement of violence", many civil rights groups protested saying the proposed laws threatened free speech, including AMCRAN co-convenor Waleed Kadous who said he was "deeply concerned about how this will impact on quite legitimate free speech".

Control orders: In November 2005 a submission by the organisation to a Parliamentary committee said "Of particular concern to the Muslim community is that the low test for control orders potentially opens the door for racial or religious profiling … whether it be officially or unofficially," the submission says. This could happen at the level of grassroots policing or in the court room." it said. "In the courtroom, there is a real possibility that the fact that a person prays at a particular mosque, or that they are devout Muslims, could be used as evidence to support claims of involvement in terrorism", the submission said

In January 2006 the Australian Muslim Civil Rights Advocacy Network criticised the new laws of the Australian Anti-Terrorism Act 2005 allowing the military to be called out in the case of a major terrorist attack. The organisation's submission to a Senate Committee highlighted the problems of police working alongside the military using Northern Ireland in the 1970s as an example, saying "Events such as these elucidate the dangers in deploying highly armed soldiers, trained and equipped to kill, into civilian areas,"
