= Australian Law Students' Association =

Confederation of Australian law student associations

The Australian Law Students' Association
- Company type: Public, limited by guarantee
- Founded: 1976 (First Conference)
- Website: alsa.asn.au

The Australian Law Students' Association is a confederation of Australian law student associations and societies, representing some 28,000 students in all.
