= University of Melbourne Student Union =

Australian student organisation

University of Melbourne Union
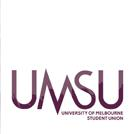
- University of Melbourne Union logo

History
- Founded: 1884; 142 years ago

Leadership
- President: Lushomo (Lushy) Chinganya, Independent
- Secretary: Daniel Motika, Community for UMSU
- CEO: Sara Pheasant

Structure
- Seats: 22
- Political groups: Activate-Left Action (5); Growth (3); Independent Media (1); Independent Southbank Students for Democracy (1); Community for UMSU (11); Vacant (1)
- Length of term: 1 year
- Affiliations: National Union of Students

Meeting place
- Building 168, University of Melbourne

Website
- umsu.unimelb.edu.au

Constitution
- UMSU Constitution

Rules
- UMSU Regulations and Policy

The University of Melbourne Student Union (UMSU) is one of two student organisations at the University of Melbourne, Australia. It provides representation and services for all current students and the University of Melbourne.

Following the liquidation of its predecessor, The Melbourne University Student Union (MUSU), UMSU was incorporated on 17 November 2005, following approval by the Council of the University of Melbourne in October of that year. Its first elections were held in October 2005 under the transitional clauses of the constitution.

== Culture ==
There is a long history of student activities at the University of Melbourne. The Union Band Comp has kick-started the careers of several well-known Australian bands, and an annual comedy review once produced the Working Dog crew. Several Members of Parliament were active within the MUSU, including Sir Robert Menzies (former Australian Prime Minister), Lindsay Tanner (Former Member for Melbourne) and Sophie Mirabella (Former Member for Indi).

=== Theatres ===
UMSU's Union and Guild Theatres are located within the Arts and Cultural Building on the Parkville campus. The Union Theatre, also known as the Union House Theatre, was founded around 1953, along with the Union Theatre Repertory Company. A large number of notable Australian performers, writers and other notable people did some of their earliest work there, including Cate Blanchett, Barry Humphries, Steve Vizard, Barrie Kosky, Graeme Blundell, and Germaine Greer. It is on the ground floor of the Student Union. The Guild Theatre is on Level 1.

The Open Stage was part of the original Drama Department, and the name was kept when it moved into the new Arts Centre on Swanston Street, Carlton, in late 1973. A flexible "open stage" performance venue, it is now located at the 757 Swanston Street building, on the corner of Swanston and Grattan Streets, and used for many purposes. These include performance-based teaching by faculty of the VCA as well as various other university courses, such as cinema and cultural studies; special events such as short courses, symposia, and media launches; and student theatre productions and cultural performances on campus, organised by students officially affiliated with one of the student associations.

=== Student clubs and Societies ===
Over 200 student-run clubs and societies are affiliated to UMSU, which supports these organisations though financial grants and administrative assistance. The groups affiliated with UMSU range from the Fotoholics - Photography Club to the Pirates, but the largest and most notable of these societies are the faculty clubs (Arts' Students Society & Science Students' Society) which have the largest balls and parties on campus.

==== Theatre clubs ====
Union House Theatre is the facilitator of student theatre at the Parkville campus, and runs two theatre spaces available for use by student theatre groups. Student theatre groups include the Melbourne University Absurdist Theatre Society (MUATS), the University of Melbourne Music Theatre Association (UMMTA), the Throwback Players and the Union Players, as well as groups for the Colleges. Faculty theatre clubs include the Law and Medical Revues. Theatre clubs from culturally diverse backgrounds include Chinese and Sri Lankan theatre groups.

==== Faculty clubs ====
There are seven notable faculty clubs at the University of Melbourne: The Melbourne Arts Students' Society, The Science Students' Society, The Engineering Students' Club, The Commerce Students' Society, The Biomedicine Students' Society, The Environments Students' Society (ENVi), and the Music Students' Society (MSS). All clubs run events throughout the year aimed at integrating new students into university life, running social activities and liaising between the faculties and the current students to enable and encourage their studies and enable opportunities for future employment.

==== Political clubs ====
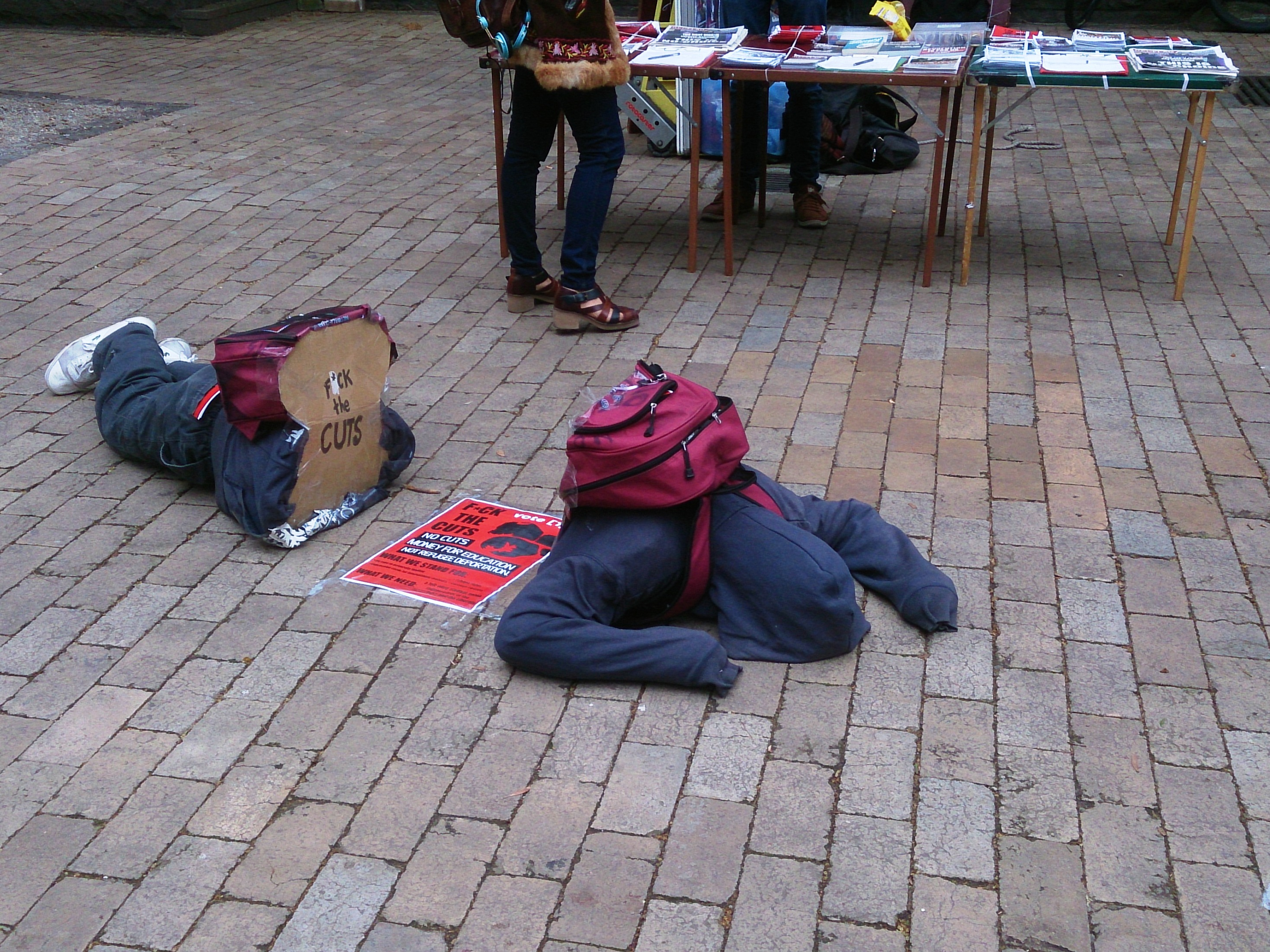
Students Protest Against Education Cuts. University of Melbourne Parkville, September, 2013

Political clubs in 2020 include Melbourne International Relations Society (MIRS) Liberals, the ALP Club (Labor Left), Labor (Labor Right), Greens, Socialist Alternative and Solidarity, as well as clubs representing Amnesty International and the Political Interest Society.

A number of activist campaign groups are affiliated to the student union, including the Campus Refugee Rights Club and the Australian Youth Climate Coalition.

==== Cultural and linguistic clubs ====
As of 2023, there are 43 cultural and linguistic clubs. Out of those, there are 29 Asian cultural and linguistic clubs, 4 Middle Eastern cultural and linguistic clubs, 5 European cultural and linguistic clubs, 1 African club and 4 broader cultural and linguistic clubs.

==== Debating society ====
The Melbourne University Debating Society is one of Victoria's oldest student organisations, founded in 1876. MUDS holds weekly debating competitions, as well as larger annual invitational competitions for other universities in the lead-up to the World Universities Debating Championships, and the Australasian Intervarsity Debating Championships. Historically, the University of Melbourne has been very successful, hosting the 1993 World Universities Debating Championship, and making it to the Grand Final of the 2003 WUDC. Additionally, MUDS were the champions of the 2019 Australasian Intervarsity Debating Championships. The Society also hosts Public Debates, and is one of the largest student groups on campus.

==== Special Interest ====
As of 2021, there are 35 special interest clubs including Unimelb Love Letters and the Bullet Journal and Stationery Club.

== Funding ==
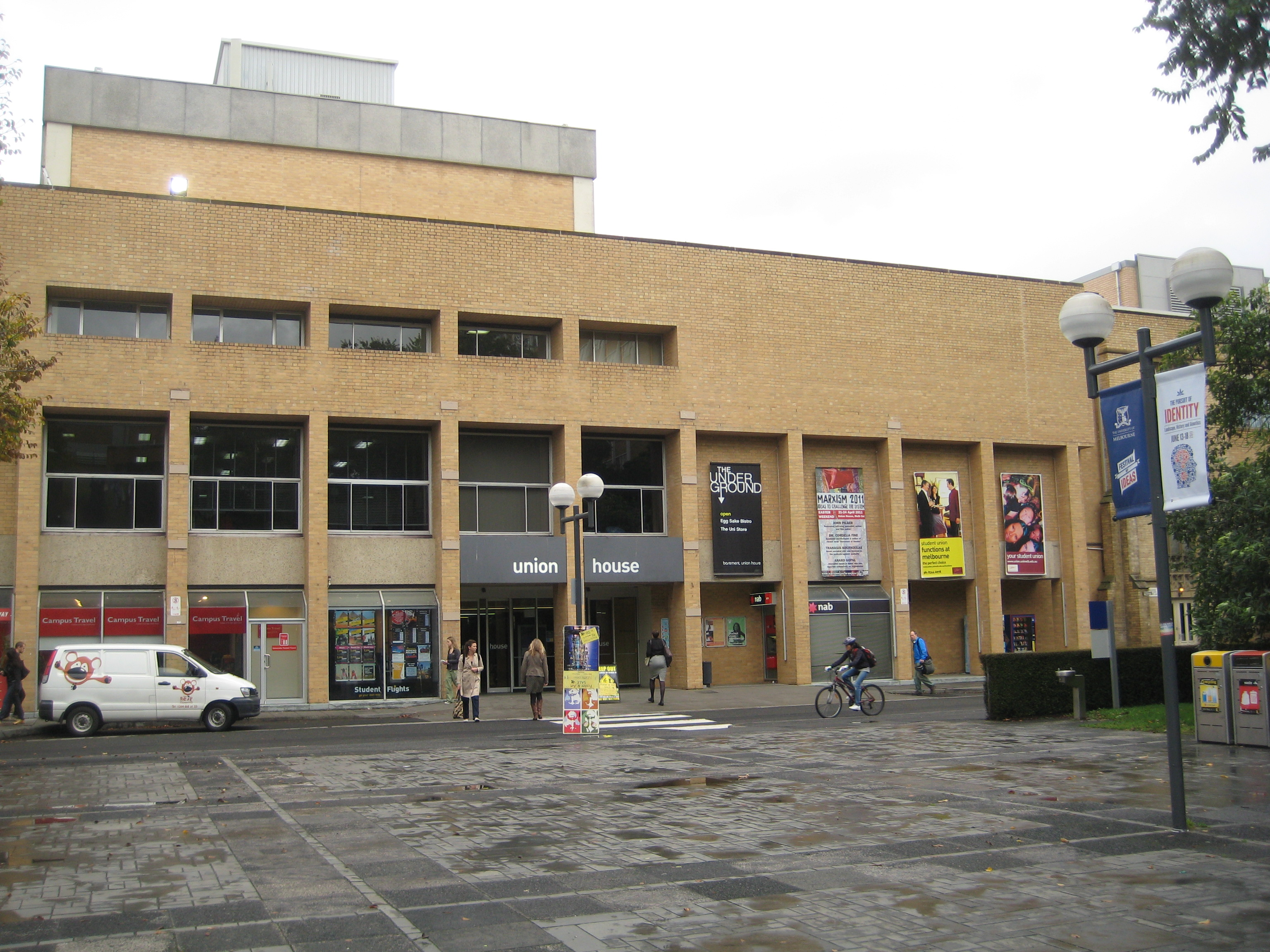
Union House in the Parkville Campus

The student union had been funded by compulsory Amenities and Services Fees since 1911. The introduction of VSU saw a significant loss of funding for the union, as the ASF was no longer charged from 1 July 2006. On 11 October 2011 the SSAF was introduced which led to a large increase in funding to the Union, though not as high as in the pre-VSU era. In 2014 the Union was allocated just under $4.5 million by the university, or 34% of the total SSAF revenue collected.

The union funds a range of services including: the Rowden White library; the Student Union Advocacy and Legal Service; the campus information centre; the Union House Theater, Clubs and Societies, Farrago, Student Representation and common areas in Union House. This allocation also covers staff salaries, and office bearer honorariums. UMSU additionally collects a small amount of revenue from event ticket sales, AV and BBQ hire, sponsorship and other sources.

== History ==
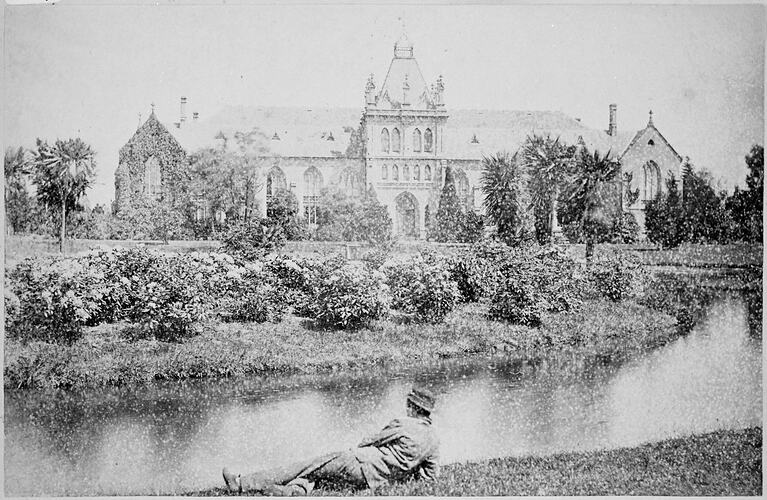
Union House and lake in 1885. The Gothic Revival National Museum building designed by Joseph Reed in 1863 became the first home of the Student Union. Mostly demolished during 1960s renovations, parts of the interior and exterior remained embedded within its later namesake.

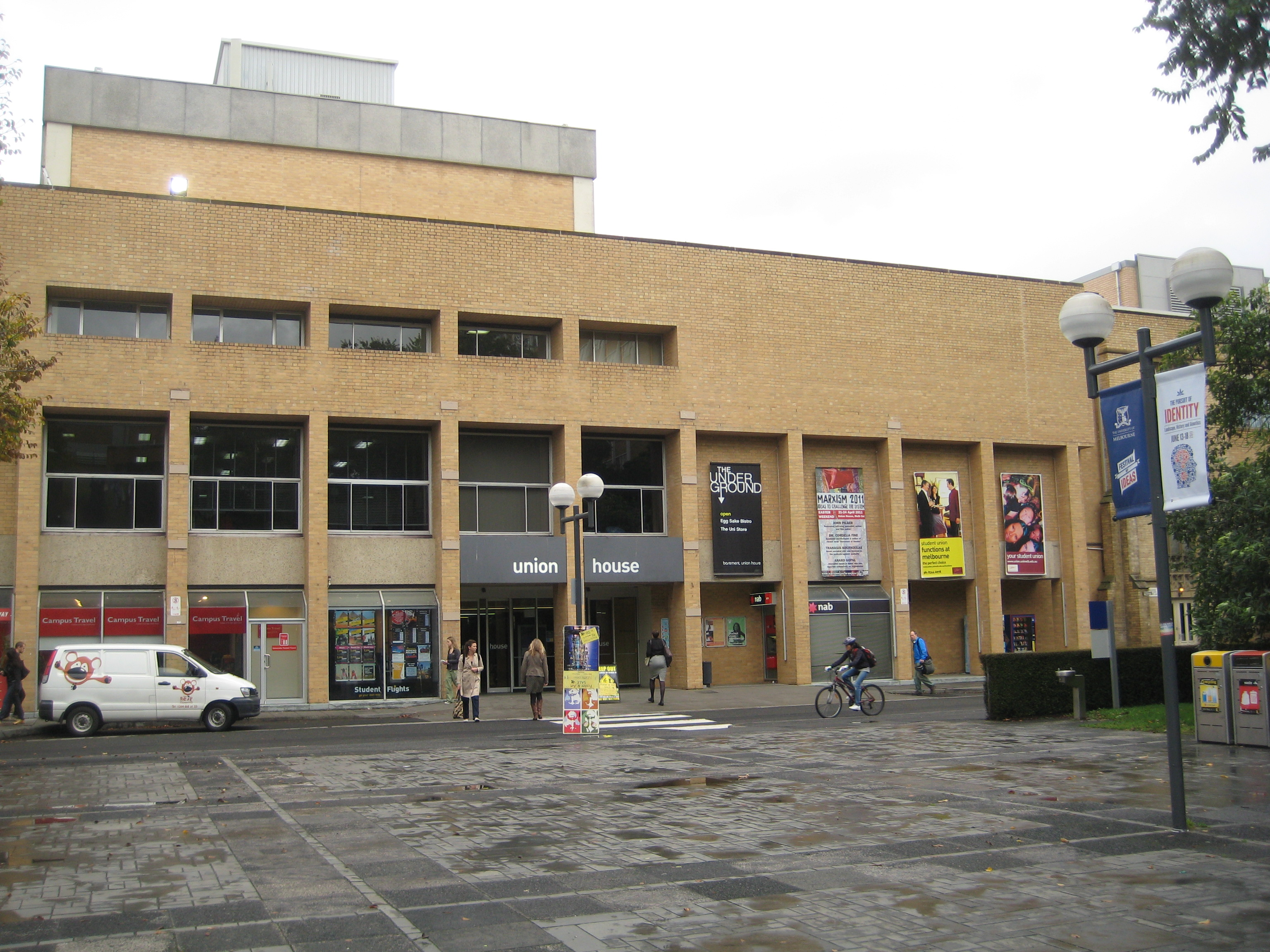
Union House in the Parkville Campus was completed in 1970 and is an example of Brutalist architecture.

The University of Melbourne Union was founded in 1884 to promote the common interests of students and assist in social interactions between its members. It set up headquarters in the 1863 Joseph Reed designed gothic revival styled National Museum building which was renamed Union House by 1885. The Melbourne University Students’ Representative Council was formed as an independent, unincorporated association at a special general meeting called by the Sports Union Council on 19 September 1907.

=== Renovations and additions to Union House ===
In 1935, the Union proposed to replace its building with a larger 3 storey free gothic design that would incorporate the shell of the 1863 building. However the works did not proceed. Instead, in 1938 a new theatre, the Union theatre, designed by Philip Burgoyne Hudson, was added.

In 1964 the Union and university sought to modernise its image and proposed demolishing the majority of the 1863 gothic building. Architect Eggleston MacDonald & Secomb was commissioned to redesign Union House including a new concrete forecourt and new theatre known as the Guild theatre. The result was a modern blonde brick and concrete brutalist design which retained the name of Union House. To save on demolition and construction costs, a small section of eastern facade of the original building and part of the large wooden roof structure of the main hall were integrated into the new building which was completed in 1970.

=== Incorporation ===
The Associations Incorporation Act (1981) allowed incorporation of student bodies, among others. The Students’ Association was incorporated in 1987 as the Melbourne College of Advanced Education Students’ Association-Carlton Incorporated, and the Students’ Representative Council was incorporated in 1988 as Melbourne University Students’ Representative Council Incorporated. In October 1988, the two merged to form Melbourne University Student Union Incorporated (MUSUi).

=== Relocation to New Student Precinct ===
After over 100 years in Union House, UMSU was relocated to the New Student Precinct in 2022. UMSU is now housed across neighbouring buildings in the precinct, with most of the organisation residing in Building 168 (formerly Doug McDonell Building). Union House Theatre and George Paton Gallery are now located in the Arts & Cultural Building, while the Rowden White Library can be found in the Student Pavilion.

=== Voluntary liquidation ===
From 2002, some of the union's unprofitable commercial services were terminated, including U-Bar, and a property deal was entered into with Optima Property Development Group. A draft report from auditor PricewaterhouseCoopers warned in June 2003 that this could potentially create obligations beyond MUSUi's capacity to pay. The deal was for MUSUi to sublease student apartments to international students from the Optima Group. It did not proceed.

On 30 September 2003, Vice-Chancellor Alan Gilbert informed MUSUi that the university was terminating the 2003 Funding Agreement, effectively stripping it of any future money, citing "evidence of breaches by MUSUI of its obligations under the Agreement" (the agreement being "providing facilities, services, or activities of direct benefit to students at the institution"). He also cited a "serious breakdown in governance, financial management, and accountability structures within MUSU."

On 6 February 2004, the union was placed into liquidation by the Supreme Court of Victoria after a vote by the Student Union Executive. MUSU's liquidator, Dean Royston McVeigh, said in his provisional liquidator's report that the union owed debts of $4.3 million (mainly to the University of Melbourne) but only had assets of $3.5 million. McVeigh acknowledged that these "debts" were the result of creative accounting by the university, with the university ultimately relinquishing any claim to such "debts". As a result, it was no longer student-controlled (a prerequisite for affiliation to NUS) and was in any case unable to pay affiliation fees. A new constitution was approved.

Master Ewart Evans, who was presiding over the hearings of the liquidators' examination until his retirement in 2005, was critical of the "somewhat precipitative" timing of civil court proceedings, which McVeigh quickly settled out of court after much adverse publicity about his own fees and expenses believed to total more than $8 million prior to producing a liquidator's report and convening a meeting of creditors. The downfall of MUSU was satirised by the Union Players in the play Friday Night at the Union in 2004.

=== Recent political history ===
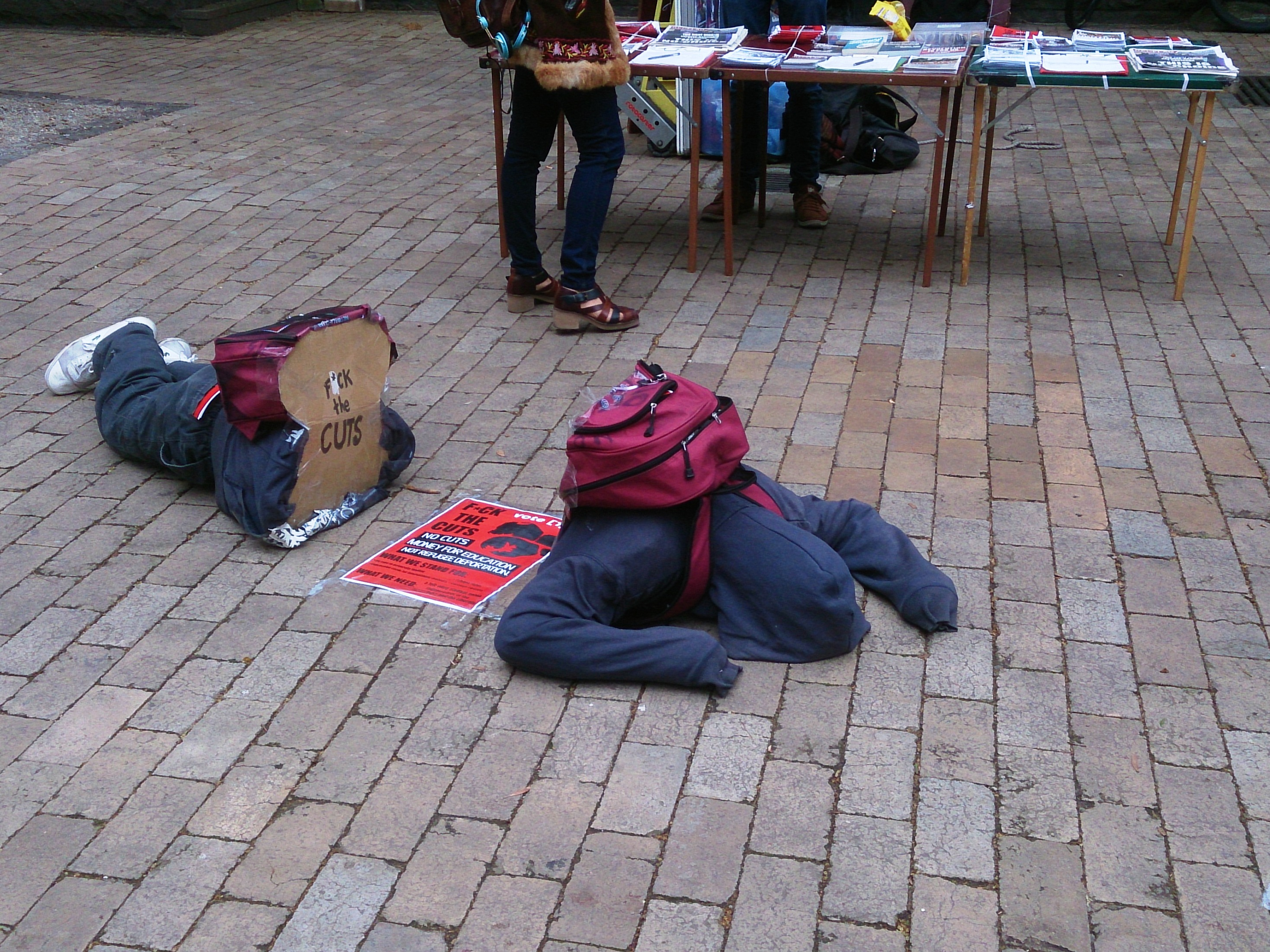
Students Protest Against Education Cuts. University of Melbourne Parkville, September 2013

Following the 2004 annual election, a coalition between the Liberal Club and the Labor Right was defeated by a cooperative left made up of National Labor Students (ALP Club), Socialist Alternative, and a group of progressive students who are not involved in other politics called Activate. The positions won by the left groups were for an interim student representative committee established by the university to oversee student representation and advocacy until the incorporation of UMSU.

UMSU saw few changes in its power dynamic from 2005-07. In 2007, National Labor Students held the President, Secretary, and Education (Academic) Offices. The makeup of the 2007 Student Council had no ALSF presence (due to the Liberal Student tickets withdrawing from the annual elections prior to the opening of the ballot). The 2007 UMSU budget, due to funding cuts caused by VSU, was reduced from just over $2 million in 2006 to $1.23 million in 2007. This resulted in reductions in funding for departments, particularly those that traditionally have been considered high, such as the Activities, Clubs, Societies, and Media Departments.

In 2008, the National Labor Students and Grassroots tickets, running as StandUp! and Activate, respectively, won most of the paid positions in the Student Union. Their tenure in 2009 was highlighted by difficulties in passing budgetary support towards the National Union of Students and Students for Palestine organisations.

2009 saw nearly all major elected positions won by a Labor Right-Liberal coalition called Synergy. On Student Council, Synergy were elected to four positions (two Liberals and two Student Unity), and five positions were won by iUnion, a newly established ticket run by international students and former StandUp! office bearers.

2012 saw the union criticised for the decision to not lay a $200 wreath at the ANZAC dawn service, with President Mark Kettle stating that "participating in the ANZAC Day service would be ‘glorifying war’". There was also a publication in a major daily newspaper that student resources had been used to support "a live and extreme sex show performed on campus for "sex education" purposes."

2013 again saw the union criticised when they passed a motion to unreservedly celebrate the death of Margaret Thatcher, resulting in media coverage from the Herald Sun and a large student backlash against the union over Facebook.

=== Presidents ===
Year	President	Ticket	Affiliation
2027	Lottie Jenkins	Together	Greens
2026	Lushy (Lushomo) Chinganya	Community, then Together	Labor Right / SDA, then independent
2025	Joshua Stagg	Community, then Growth	Labor Right / SDA, then independent
2024	Disha Zutshi	Community	Labor Right / SDA
2023	Hibatallah Adam	Community	Labor Right / SDA
2022	Sophie Nguyen	Stand Up!	Labor Left
2021	Jack Buksh	Stand Up!	Labor Left
2020	Hannah Buchan	Stand Up!	Labor Left
2019	Molly Willmott	Stand Up!	Labor Left
2018	Desiree Cai	Stand Up!	Labor Left
2017	Yan Zhuang	More!	Labor Right / TWU
2016	James Baker / Tyson Holloway-Clarke	Stand Up!	Labor Left
2015	Rachel Withers	Ignite	Labor Right
2014	Declan McGonigle	Stand Up!	Labor Left
2013	Kara Hadgraft		
2012	Mark Kettle		
2011	Rachel Lim		
2010	Jesse Overton-Skinner	Synergy	Labor Right / Liberal
2009	Carla Drakeford	Stand Up!	Labor Left
2008	Elizabeth Buckingham	Stand Up!	Labor Left
2007	Bree Aherns	Stand Up!	Labor Left
2006	Jessie Giles		
2005	Paul Donegan		

== Affiliation to NUS ==
UMSU is an affiliate to Australia's peak representative body for students, the National Union of Students (NUS). With the University of Melbourne having over 30,000 students of an Equivalent full-time student load (EFTSL), UMSU is the largest union to affiliate to NUS. Due to this, at the yearly National Conference of NUS in December, UMSU is the most represented student organisation. UMSU holds 7 delegate positions, and a grand total of 182 votes on conference floor. The election of NUS Delegates is undertaken during the general elections in early September of each year.

== Initial constitution ==
The Constitution of UMSU was drafted by a Student Representative Working Group, members of whom were elected in 2004 by electronic ballot; the university secretary was appointed returning officer. The university was closely involved in the drafting process and provided free legal advice to the Working Group.

These student Working Group members consisted of both undergraduate and post-graduate members, and the overall composition of the Working Group was factionally diverse, with the incumbent Student Unity/ALSF coalition being reduced to opposition status. Due to a large number of inquorate meetings, the Working Group instituted a drop-off rule.

The Working Group persisted until mid-2005, when the final draft of the constitution was presented to the council of the university. In September 1052 out of 1240 students voted in favour of accepting the new constitution.

The Constitution itself was largely based on the MUSU Constitution, with a number of innovations, including affirmative action provisions, pay-parity and strict accountability mechanisms curbing the powers of the President and Secretary in particular. It also created the Clubs & Societies Department (which in the past had been a part of the Activities Department) and the Indigenous Department.

=== Paid officers ===
UMSU has a number of paid officers, which include: the President; the General Secretary; Media Officers; Education (Academic Affairs) Officer; Education (Public Affairs) Officers; Activities Officers; Creative Arts Officers; Clubs and Societies Officers; Welfare Officer; Environment Officers; Indigenous Officers; Disabilities Officers; Queer Officers; Women's Officers; People of Colour Officers; the Burnley Campus Coordinator; the Southbank Campus Coordinators; the Southbank Activities Officer, and the Southbank Education Officer.

Aside from the positions of President, General Secretary, the campus coordinator of Burnley, the Southbank Activities Officer and the Southbank Education officer, all other offices can be shared between two people. The Media Office must be shared between three or four people.

UMSU has a pay parity provision in its constitution which stipulates that all full-time officers must be paid an equal wage and that all part-time officers be paid at a .6 fraction of the full-time rate of pay. The Burnley Campus Coordinator is paid at .5 fraction of the full-time rate of pay and the Southbank Activities and Southbank Education Officers are paid at .6 fraction of the full-time rate of pay.

== Elections and current factions ==
=== Elections ===
Elections for positions within UMSU are determined through direct election during the first week of September each year. This sees the election of 32 paid office bearers of 17 representative departments, as well as 22 students who sit on UMSU's peak decision body, Students Council. The election of representatives onto department committees and seven NUS delegates also occurs at this time, with the election of a student representative onto the university's Council occurring every two years.

As of the 2016 election, the UMSU constitution has applied Affirmative Action to the election of positions held by more than one representative. This mandates that in all Office Bearer positions, at least 50% of elected representatives must identify as a woman, with the Women's Department having to elect at least one officer that identifies as a Woman of Colour. This is extended to Students Council and department committees, which must elect women into 50%+1 of all positions. In the election of roles within autonomous departments, as well as the election of restricted autonomous positions on Students Council, only those who identify with the represented group are eligible to run.

The Students' Council, the peak body for the union, is made up of 22 student representatives. There are 15 General Representatives, plus 7 for special constituencies – Queer, Indigenous, International, Graduate, Students with Disabilities, Students at the Southbank Campus, and Students of Colour.

=== 2026 election results ===
The 2026 election was held between September 7–11. Unlike previous years this election was held in person at the recommendation made by the Returning Officer, with students voting on laptops at polling places around campus, with postal voting offered to those who cannot vote in person for accessibility.

As of 28/09/2026, results are officially declared by the Returning Officer and Electoral Tribunal. The elected representatives of 2026 will be appointed into office on 1 December 2026

2026 Student Council Election
Party	Faction	Votes	Percentage	Seats	Change
Together for UMSU	Labor Left, Greens, Labor (TWU aligned), Left-Wing Independents, Independent Socialists	1147	38.8%	9	▲4^{1}
Community for UMSU	Labor Right/Independents, SDA aligned	996	33.7%	8^{2}	▼3
Socialist Action - Free Palestine	Socialist Alternative	495	16.7%	3^{2}	New
Independent Media	Independent ticket that encompasses around campus newspaper Farrago	185	6.25%	1	Steady
Independent Southbank Students for Democracy	Independent ticket based around Southbank campus	N/A	N/A	1	Steady
Progress	Melbourne University Liberal Club	66	2.2%	0	Steady
Better	Independent	50	1.7%	0	New
Independent		19	0.6%	0	Steady
Total		2,958		22	
Total		Quota		184.876	

^{1} Change from Activate - Left Action

^{2} At the 2026 election Socialist Action and Community for UMSU had a coalition agreement running some candidates on each others tickets. As such 1 candidate elected under Socialist Action is part of Community for UMSU.

=== 2025 election results ===
At the 2025 election, no nominations were received for the position of Indigenous Representative.

2025 Student Council Election
Party	Faction	Votes	Percentage	Seats	Change
Community for UMSU	Labor Right/Independents, SDA aligned	1,207	38.5%	11	Steady
Activate - Left Action	Labor Left, Greens, UniMelb for Palestine, Socialist Alternative, Labor Right TWU aligned	903	28.8%	5	▼1^{1}
Growth	Independents	665	21.2%	3	New
Independent Media	Independent ticket that encompasses around campus newspaper Farrago	103	3.3%	1	Steady
Independent Southbank Students for Democracy	Independent ticket based around Southbank campus	N/A	N/A	1	Steady
Rebuild	Melbourne University Liberal Club	114	3.6%	0	▼1
Independent		144	4.6%	0	▼1
Vacant				1	
Total		3,136		22	
Total		Quota		196.06	

^{1} Change from combined seat count of Activate and Left Action

=== 2024 election results ===
2024 Student Council Election
Party	Faction	Votes	Percentage	Seats	Change
Community for UMSU	Labor Right/Independents, SDA aligned	1,504	36.7%	11	Steady
Activate	Labor Left, Greens, UniMelb for Palestine	885	21.6%	3	New
Left Action	Socialist Alternative	841	20.5%	3	▼3
More!	Labor Right, TWU aligned	342	8.4%	1	New
Rebuild	Melbourne University Liberal Club	297	7.3%	1	▼1
Independent Media	Independent ticket that encompasses around campus newspaper Farrago	130	3.2%	1	Steady
Independent Southbank Students for Democracy	Independent ticket based around Southbank campus	N/A	N/A	1	▲1^{1}
Independent		95	2.3%	1	▲1
Total		4,094		22	
Total		Quota		257.126	

^{1} Change from Southbank Students! For UMSU

=== 2023 election results ===
2023 Student Council Election
Party	Faction	Votes	Percentage	Seats	Change
Community for UMSU	Labor Right/Independents, SDA aligned	1,500	42.2%	11	▼2
Left Action	Socialist Alternative	831	23.4%	6	▲3
Stand Up!	National Labor Students/Labor Left	491	13.8%	2	▲1
Rebuild our UMSU	Melbourne University Liberal Club	418	11.8%	2	▲1
Independent Media	Independent ticket that encompasses around campus newspaper Farrago	159	4.5%	1	Steady
Southbank Students! For UMSU	Independent ticket based around Southbank campus	72	2.0%	0	New
Independent		86	2.4%	0	Steady
Total		3,557		22	
Total		Quota		222.063	

=== 2022 election results ===
At the 2022 election, no nominations were received for the positions of Indigenous Representative and Southbank Representative.

2022 Student Council Election
Party	Faction	Votes	Percentage	Seats	Change
Community for UMSU	Labor Right/Independents	1654	50.0%	13	Steady
Left Action	Socialist Alternative	673	20.3%	3	▲2
Stand Up!	National Labor Students/Labor Left	343	10.4%	1	▼4
Rebuild	Melbourne University Liberal Club	276	8.3%	1	New
Independents for Student Democracy	Independent ticket based around students engaging with elections	197	5.9%	1	Steady
Independent Media	Independent ticket that encompasses around campus newspaper Farrago	128	3.9%	1	Steady
Independent		40	1.2%	0	Steady
Vacant				2	
Total		3,311		22	
Total		Quota			

=== 2021 election results ===
At the 2021 Student Council election, no independent candidates contested for general representative on student council, as they were either disqualified for failing to submit Declaration, withdrew their nomination or were not an UMSU General Member at the time of Nominations closing.

Additionally, the position of Southbank Students Representative on Council was introduced in this Student Council election, bringing the total number of voting members to 22.

2021 Student Council Election
Party	Faction	Votes	Percentage	Seats	Change
Community for UMSU	Labor Right/Independents	1284	41.9%	13	▲1
Stand Up!	National Labor Students/Labor Left	938	30.6%	5	Steady
Left Action	Socialist Alternative	285	9.3%	1	^{1}
Independents for Student Democracy	Independent ticket based around students engaging with elections	192	6.3%	1	▲1
Independent Media	Independent ticket that encompasses around campus newspaper Farrago	150	4.9%	1	Steady
Independent^{2}	Indigenous students	N/A	N/A	1	▲1
Liberals off campus - Stop the Menzies Institute	Anti-Liberal Party activists	59	1.9%	0	New
The People's Press	Independent ticket that focuses on contested Media Officers positions	58	1.9%	0	New
VVholesome	Satire ticket that encourages voting and participation in democracy	57	1.9%	0	Steady
Fightback for UMSU	Independents	39	1.3%	0	New
Total		3,062		22	
Total		Quota			

^{1} Change from Student Resistance

^{2} Despite not registered as a ticket, the only seat won by independent students is the position of Indigenous Representative, by a group of independent Indigenous students.

=== 2020 election results ===
2020 Student Council Election
Party	Faction	Seats
Community for UMSU	Labor Right/Independents	12
Stand Up!	National Labor Students/Labor Left	5
Student Resistance	Socialist Alternative	1
Just Clubs. Just Activities.	Independent ticket that focuses on the Clubs & Societies Department	1
Independent Media	Independent ticket that encompasses around campus newspaper Farrago	1
Independent^{1}	Indigenous students & Independents	1
Amplify	Liberal Party of Australia	0
Fee Remissions Now!	Socialist Alternative	0
VVholesome	Satire ticket that encourages voting and participation in democracy	0
Independents for Student Democracy	Independent ticket based around students engaging with elections	0
Total		21

^{1} The only independent seat was won by independents (no affiliated ticket) is the Indigenous Representative position, other independent students who contested general members on council did not win any seats.

== Notable associations ==
Several Members of Parliament were active within Melbourne University student life, including Sir Robert Menzies (former Australian Prime Minister), Gareth Evans (former Australian Foreign Minister), Lindsay Tanner (former Member for Melbourne), Michael Danby (former Member for Melbourne Ports), Richard Marles (Deputy Prime Minister of Australia), Alan Tudge (Member for Aston), and Sophie Mirabella (former Member for Indi).

Notable past presidents include:

- Robert Menzies (1916–17)
- Evan Thornley (1987)
- Richard Marles (1988)
- Andrew Landeryou (1991)
- Alan Tudge (1991)

== See also ==
- George Paton Gallery
