= Peter McPhee (academic) =

Australian academic and former provost

Peter McPhee AM FASSA FAHA
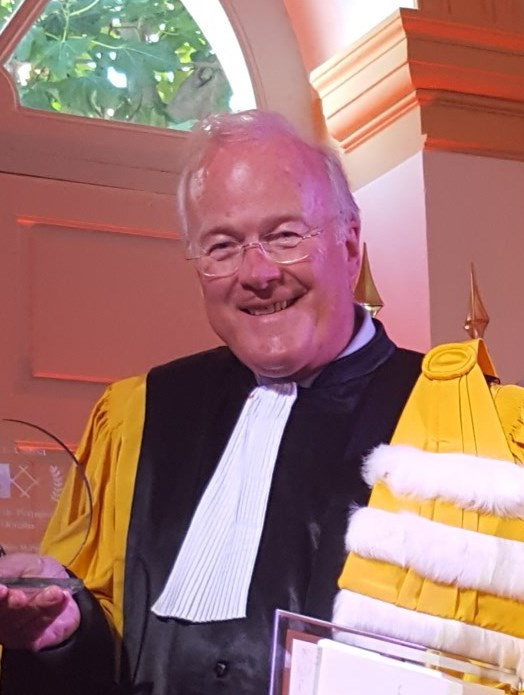
- McPhee in 2018
- Born: 24 January 1948 (age 78); Melbourne, Victoria
- Education: University of Melbourne (BA, MA, DipEd, PhD)
- Occupation: Academic
- Awards: Centenary Medal, Order of Australia, FAHA, FASSA

Peter McPhee AM FASSA FAHA (born 24 January 1948) is an Australian academic and former provost of the University of Melbourne. He is the first person to have held the position at Melbourne, as it has typically only been in place at universities in the United States and the United Kingdom.

== Life and career ==
Born in Melbourne and raised in Coleraine and Colac, McPhee was educated at Colac High School, Caulfield Grammar School and Trinity College while studying at the University of Melbourne, where he earned his Bachelor of Arts and Master of Arts degrees, a Diploma in Education and a Doctor of Philosophy degree in history.

He later taught at La Trobe University (1975–79) and the Victoria University of Wellington (1980–86) before teaching history at Melbourne, where he has held a personal chair since 1993. He specialises in research on French history and the French Revolution, having published numerous books on the subject. His academic management positions at Melbourne have included working as Deputy Dean of the School of Graduate Studies, head of the Department of History and president of the university's academic board. In 2003 he became the deputy vice-chancellor and in 2007 was appointed as the inaugural provost. As part of this role he was responsible for planning and introducing the university's new Melbourne Model, which is designed to maintain consistency with the Bologna Accords' structure for European higher education.

McPhee retired from the University of Melbourne on 14 July 2009 but continues to serve as a professorial fellow in the Melbourne Centre for the Study of Higher Education. He remains an active researcher and teacher, lecturing and supervising both undergraduate and graduate students in history.

From 2012 to 2017, McPhee served as chair of the board of Melbourne University Publishing.

In 2014, McPhee, in cooperation with the University of Melbourne and Coursera, developed a free online course on the French Revolution. The course follows the chapters in his eBook, The French Revolution, which builds on his popular undergraduate course at Melbourne.

He currently serves as chair of the History Council of Victoria, the state's peak body for the study of history, a role to which he was appointed in March 2020.

== Honours ==
McPhee was elected a Fellow of the Australian Academy of the Humanities in 1997 and a Fellow of the Academy of the Social Sciences in Australia in 2003. Earlier that year he had received the Centenary Medal for services to Australian education.

In the 2012 Australia Day Honours, McPhee was made a Member of the Order of Australia for his "service to tertiary education administration, to the discipline of history as an academic and author, and to professional associations".

In June 2018, he received a doctorate honoris causa from the University of Perpignan for his lifelong contribution to the study of change and continuity in regional and rural France during and following the French Revolution, especially in the Occitanie region.

== Writings ==
- An Environmental History of France: Creating the Landscape 1770-2020 (2024). Bloomsbury Publishing, ISBN 9781350523852
- Liberty or Death: The French Revolution (2015). Yale University Press. eBook ISBN 9780522869149
- Robespierre: A Revolutionary Life (2012). Yale University Press, ISBN 0-30011-811-2
- Living the French Revolution, 1789-1799 (2006). Palgrave Macmillan, ISBN 0-33399-739-5
- A social history of France, 1789-1914 (2004). Palgrave Macmillan, ISBN 0-33399-751-4
- The French Revolution, 1789-1799 (2002). Oxford University Press, ISBN 0-19924-414-6
- The French Revolution and Napoleon : a sourcebook (2002; editor, with Philip G. Dwyer). Routledge, ISBN 0-41519-907-7
- Pansy : a life of Roy Douglas Wright (1999). Melbourne University Press, ISBN 0-52284-626-2
- Revolution and environment in Southern France, 1780-1830 : peasants, lords, and murder in the Corbieres (1999). Oxford University Press, ISBN 0-19820-717-4
- A social history of France 1780-1880 (1992). Routledge, ISBN 0-41501-615-0
- The politics of rural life : political mobilization in the French countryside, 1846-1852 (1992). Oxford University Press, ISBN 0-19820-225-3
- The French revolution in a Mediterranean community : Collioure 1780-1815 (1999). History Department, University of Melbourne, ISBN 0-86839-876-4

== See also ==
- List of Caulfield Grammar School people
