= Resistance: Young Socialist Alliance =

- Founded: 1967; 59 years ago
- Headquarters: Sydney, New South Wales
- Ideology: Anti-capitalism; Eco-socialism; Left-wing populism; Marxism
- Position: Left-wing to far-left
- Mother party: Socialist Alliance
- International affiliation: World Federation of Democratic Youth
- Newspaper: Green Left
- Slogan: "Unfuck the World!"
- Website: Official website

Resistance: Young Socialist Alliance (RYSA) is the youth wing of Socialist Alliance, an Australian eco-socialist and anti-capitalist political party.

With membership automatic for all party members up to the age of 26, RYSA has had a long history, both as a Socialist Alliance affiliate and independent socialist organisation. Resistance, as it was originally known, was founded in 1967 by left-wing students, eventually growing to have large influence on campus politics, helped by its commitment to demonstrations and activism, and not just electoral activity.

Resistance remained a youth socialist organisation, maintaining close links with the Democratic Socialist Perspective party, the predecessor of the modern Socialist Alliance. Resistance became the youth wing of the latter in 2014, in order to "strengthen ... organisation overall and provide a solid framework to recruit and integrate youth to radical politics moving forward".

RYSA maintains a presence throughout every state and territory of Australia, based in the local Resistance Activist Centres, where local party and Green Left Weekly branches are also headquartered. RYSA organises an annual youth socialist conference, known as "Radical Ideas."

== Campaigns ==
Resistance campaigns on many social justice and environmental issues. Current national campaigns include: action on climate change, equal marriage rights, rolling back the Northern Territory Intervention, ending mandatory detention for asylum seekers, equal rights for women, Boycott, Divestment and Sanctions against Israel, and stopping cuts to tertiary education.

Resistance also campaigns around international issues such as ending the wars in Iraq and Afghanistan, ending the occupation of Palestine, support for the Venezuelan and Cuban revolutions, and support for Tamil self-determination in Sri Lanka.

== Green Left Weekly ==
Resistance members help to write for and produce Green Left Weekly, and each edition includes one page dedicated to articles written by Resistance members about youth issues or movements Resistance is involved in. In the past, Resistance has organised a multi-page magazine insert into Green Left Weekly and periodically organises lift-out sheets.

== History ==
Resistance was formed in 1967 out of the Sydney University Labor Club and the Vietnam Action Campaign. This was a time when students were being radicalised by the Vietnam war. Throughout the late 1960s, Resistance struggled with members of the ALP and CPA for the anti-Vietnam War movement to call mass demonstrations; these experiences formed the basis of Resistance's opposition to Stalinism and emphasis on mass action in social movements. In late 1969, leaders of the CPA attempted to limit Resistance's involvement in the Vietnam Moratorium Campaign in Sydney, proposing that only representatives of affiliated organisations should participate in an organising committee. However, the majority of those attending the founding meeting of the VMC rejected the CPA's proposals; Jim Percy, a leading member of Resistance, played a leading role in the following Moratorium campaign of independent mass mobilisations against the war, which built the largest antiwar actions ever seen in Australia at that time, with 75,000 marching in Melbourne and 20,000 marching in Sydney.

The original name for the organisation was SCREW, said either to stand for Society for the Cultivation of Rebellion Every Where, or Sydney Committee for Revolution and Emancipation of the Working Class. After a few months the name was changed to Resistance, and at the founding national conference in 1970 the name was changed to Socialist Youth Alliance, to be changed back to Resistance 10 years later.

Resistance has organised campaigns such as the high school walkouts against Pauline Hanson in 1998, which drew 14,000 students to protest, the single largest political action taken by secondary students in Australia's history. Resistance was involved in the Books not Bombs collective which organised anti-war protests in 2003 of around 5000 students, the APEC protests against George W. Bush in 2007 and Students Against the Pulp Mill in 2008.

When the DSP and several other groups formed the Socialist Alliance in early 2001, Resistance gave its solidarity but did not affiliate to the Alliance until late 2003.

Resistance held its 39th national conference in Wollongong, 24–26 April 2010. The organisation's 40th national conference was held in Sydney in 2011. In 2012, Resistance held its 41st national conference in Adelaide, 20–22 July. Conference participants joined local union activists in a protest at Coles in solidarity with striking transport workers.

In terms of activity, Resistance is now largely dormant; with no activity on its website since 2017. The activity of the organisation and its would-be members has largely been absorbed into the broader party.
