= University of Queensland Union =

Student organisation

- University of Queensland Union logo

History
- Founded: 1911; 115 years ago

Leadership
- President: Alyssa Roser, Community
- Secretary: Poppy Kidd, Progressives
- Treasurer: Hanirud Velayutham, Community

Structure
- Seats: 25
- Political groups: Community (6); Lao Gan Ma (4); Left Action For Gaza (4); Together (3); Global Mates (2); Progressives (2); RAGE (1); Fight (1); Stacked! (1); Yo-Chi on Campus (1)
- Length of term: 1 year
- Affiliations: National Union of Students
- Newspaper: Semper Floreat

Meeting place
- Union Building (Building 21A), University of Queensland

Website
- uqu.com.au

Constitution
- Constitution approved on December 2022

Rules
- uqu.com.au/wp-content/uploads/UQ-Union-Regulations-16.09.2025.pdf

The University of Queensland Union (UQ Union) is a student organisation established in 1911 to provide services, support and representation to students of the University of Queensland. The UQ Union oversees approximately $15 million in revenue each financial year.

== Student services ==
The UQU operates most of the campus's student eateries, cafes, bookshops in addition to the university bar and cinema. These facilities and services are concentrated at the Union Complex at the St Lucia campus.

The UQU organises the university's orientation week ("O-Week") activities, regular barbecues and free bands, as well as a range of larger events, such as Cultural Fiesta and, as of 2016, the annual Neon Party (previously the Toga Party from 2009–16). Recently the UQU introduced a club funding scheme that supports over 200 clubs and societies, including faculty, ethnic, and a variety of social groups; sporting groups, however, fall under the domain of UQ Sport. The UQU also provides a free legal service to university students. In addition, it also organises the weekly Wednesday markets at the St Lucia campus.

One of the other roles of the UQU is to see that minority groups on campus are adequately supported. To this extent, it provides Queer Spaces and Women's Spaces at St Lucia campus and Gatton campuses, and a Disabilities Collective Space at the St Lucia Campus. UQU has queer, women's, environment, disabilities and Indigenous collectives to represent their respective interests. UQU operates Queer, Women's, Environment, Disabilities, Indigenous, International Student, Postgraduate, and Student Rights departments to work with collectives and students directly on advocacy and wellbeing campaigns.

== Clubs and societies ==
The UQU oversees over 220 student run Clubs and Societies, with a combined membership across these clubs of approximately 36,000 students. Clubs fall under one of four broad categories based on where they derive their membership base. These categories include: Faculty/School; International Students; Colleges; and General Interest.

Clubs play a vital role on campus, with the majority of social events at UQ being run by these student groups.

== Student publications ==
Semper Floreat (Latin: "May it always flourish") is the student newspaper of the University of Queensland. It has been published continuously by the University of Queensland Union (UQU) since 1932, when it began as a fortnightly newsletter of only a few pages, produced by one editor. It was previously published as Queensland University Magazine and Galmahra. The Student Union also published a Songbook for Commemoration celebrations, featuring songs celebrating the Faculties and Professors of the time. The Songbook went by a number of names, including Whack-Ho. By the 1960s songs were omitted from the publication, replaced by articles and cartoons reflecting student culture of the time.

== Executives ==
Each year, the students of the University of Queensland optionally participate in electing a student executive to the UQ Union, these elections have been occurring since the inception of the union in the 1910s and provide students with a say in who runs the peak student representative body for all campuses. The UQU executive have predominantly been run by groups of students aligned with the major political parties of Australia and their historical predecessors. For much of the Union's history voting was done for individual positions not group tickets, in some years, such as 2003, this resulted in the President being from a Labor Left ticket and the Secretary and Treasurer from a Liberal ticket.

=== Presidents ===
Year	President	Union Secretary	Treasurer	Party
1981	David Barbagallo	Fiona McKenna	Nigel Pennington	Labor Right
1982	Ken Macpherson	Fleur Kingham	Nigel Pennington	Labor Right
1983	Fleur Kingham	Danielle Bond	Paul Lucas	Labor Left/Labor Right
1984	Tony Kynaston	Ric Moore	Karen Axford	Labor Left/Labor Right
1985	Brad Bauman	Kate Greenwood	Tony Kynaston	Liberal/Labor Right
1986	Jillann Farmer	Jenny Fox	Mark Herbert	Labor Right
1987	Andrew Lamb	Jorge Jorquera	Scott Barclay	Independents/Left
1988	Dirk Moses	Robyn Finken/ Andrea Napier	Mark Bahnisch	Labor Right
1989	Victoria Brazil	James Jarvis	Julian Sheezel	National/Liberal
1990	Jane Lye	Kirsten Greathead	Rebecca Keys	Reform/Labor Right
1991	James Gifford	John Briggs	Donna Sinopoli	Liberal
1992	Michael Kleinschmidt	Anne-Marie Valentak	Marcus Clark	Liberal
1993	Sandy Brown	Daniel Varghese	Martin Bush	SEA (Students for Education Action)
1994	Murray Watt	Jenny McAllister	Mary Thorpe	Focus (Labor Left)
1995	Maya Stuart-Fox	Timothy Ward	Michael Caldwell	Labor
1996	Jody Thompson	Luke Myers	Michael Barry	Liberal
1997	Cynthia Kennedy	Anna Straton	Jamie Dawson	Labor Left
1998	Bede Nicholson	Katie Connolly	David McElrea	Labor Left
1999	Matthew Carter	Alissa Macoun	Benjamin Turnbull	Labor Left
2000	Sarah McBratney	Matthew Collins	Rebecca Lang	Labor Left
2001	Juliana Virine	Angela Setterlund	Adam Kent	Labor Left
2002	Christopher Vernon	Lisa Chesters	Aaron Meadows	NLS
2003	Aaron Marsham	Antonio Ferreira-Jardim	Jemma MacGinley	NLS/Liberal
2004	Margot Balch	Jonathan Hames	Michael Wright	Vision (NLS)
2005	Leah Sanderson	Jorn Herrmann	Alex Main	Focus (NLS)
2006	Lucinda Weber	Erin Fentiman	Christopher Knowles	Thrive (NLS)
2007	Julie-Ann Campbell	Diana Mackay	N/A	Voice (NLS)
2008	Josh Young	Lisa Colyer	Ben Riley	Fresh (Liberal)
2009	Brandon Carter	Luke Walker	Lisa Colyer	Fresh (Liberal)
2010	Michael Zivcic	Michelle Delport	Robert Hilmer	Fresh (LNP)
2011	Benjamin Gorrie	Brodie Thompson	Hannah Bona	Fresh (LNP)
2012	Colin Finke	Brodie Thompson	Linda Cho	Fresh (LNP)
2013	Rohan Watt	Kieran Shaw	Priyanka Luecke	Fresh (LNP)
2014	Joshua Millroy	Ines Paterson	Nathan Johnston	Reform (NLS/Labor Right)
2015	Kathryn Cramp	Matthew Hales	Tom O'Connor	Reform (NLS/Labor Right)
2016	Michael Lucas	Gabii Starr	Nora Abdalla	Reform (NLS/Labor Right)
2017	Gabii Starr	Finbar Fuller	Joshua Roser	Reform (NLS/Labor Right)
2018	Jeremy Lwin	Kelsie McArthur	Samuel Ngugi	Focus (Labor Right/LNP)
2019	Georgia Millroy	Ethan Van Roo Douglas	Nathan Kerr	Focus (Labor Right/LNP)
2020	Ethan Van Roo Douglas	Rebekah Thornton	Tom Landy	REAL (LNP)
2021	Emily Scott	Ryan Jover	Lisa Pham	Rebuild (NLS/Labor Right)
2022	Emily Searle	Cara Rowe	Radhika Peddibhotla	Rebuild (NLS/Labor Right)
2023	Richard Lee	Greta Simpson	Joshua Marsh	Rebuild (NLS/Labor Right)
2024	Angus McRae	Alex Smock	Tuifa'asisina Tapenaga Reupena Polataivao-Fatialofa II	Reform (NLS/Global Mates)
2025	Jaafar Jabur	Nomhle Putuka	Tuifa'asisina Tapenaga Reupena Polataivao-Fatialofa II	Reform (NLS/Global Mates)
2026	Alyssa Roser	Lucy Den Houting / Poppy Kidd	Hanirud Velayutham	Community (Labor Left/Democrats/Labor Right/Independents)

=== Vice-Presidents ===
Year	VP Student Rights	VP Campus Culture	VP Gender and Sexuality	Party
2009	Robert Hilmer & Aurelia Connelly	Matthew Chadwick & Sam Bool	Rachel Brimblecombe & Nick Sowden	Fresh (Liberal)
2010	Brayden Soo & Rory Broadbridge	Alexander Tate & Alisha Musil	Laney McLaren & Christopher Balean	Fresh (LNP)
2011	Michelle Delport & Isaac Robertson	Nelson Martoo & Kiran Srinivasan	Natalie Keys & Duncan Stubbs	Fresh (LNP)
2012	Bridget Young & Kieran Shaw	Abby Nydam & Nathan Flett	Ashleigh Ross & Rohan Watt	Fresh (LNP)
2013	Elliot Johnson & Harrison Bolt	Jonathan Hair & Jared Peut	Eloise Shaw & Anthony Deacon	Fresh (LNP)
2014	Laura Howden & Richard Lee	Stephen Kakoniktis & Natalie Morris	Kathryn Cramp & Lotte Scheel	Reform (NLS/Labor Right)
2015	Isabel Manfield & Shannon Fogarty	Daren Tan & Gabby Menolotto	Amy Jelacic & Annie Danks	Reform (NLS/Labor Right)
2016	Olivia Amsden & Riley Williamson	Ange Ou & Thomas Parer	Madeline Price & Emil Cañita	Reform (NLS/Labor Right)
2017	Emily Earle & Domenico Sottile	Alynna Wong & Prianka Thomas	Sabina Rooney & William Triste	Reform (NLS/Labor Right)
2018	Paul Taylor & Zachariah Schafferius	Sangwon 'Jimmy' Jin & Paige Howard	Kulkarawa Kukoyi & Nicholas Comino	Focus (Labor Right/LNP)
2019	Kaiyin Wu & Isabella Scattini	Tom Landy & Rebekah Thornton	Amy Sienkiewicz-Grob	Focus (Labor Right/LNP)
2020	Gustavo Pazo & Brodie Fennell	Lili Wackwitz & Annabel Genest	Emily Coggan & Dakota Titmus	REAL (LNP)
2021	Josie Vu & Liam Heseltine	Benjamin Kozij & Kurt Tucker	Emily Searle & Elias Blanch	Rebuild (NLS/Labor Right/LNP)
2022	Samara Paradine & Jake Coleman	Rheanna Norris & Justin Chen	Greta Simpson & Marisha Robinson	Rebuild (NLS/Labor Right)
2023	Ryley Calvert & Angus McRae	TJ Polataivao-Reupena & Shivram Shipankar	Erin Blyth & Daniel Chancellor	Rebuild (NLS/Labor Right/Global Mates)
2024	Jeryn Chang & Jordy Duffey	Jaafar Jabur & Sam Lee	Skye Taylor & Amrita Kaur	Reform (NLS/Global Mates)
2025	Lucy Den Houting & Richard Liu	Quinn Horton & Samuel Lee	Alyssa Roser & Ali Spanevello	Reform (NLS/Global Mates)
2026	Jonathan Barnes Blackburn & Isabella Young	Lachlan Hocking & Mathew Jimmy & Mia Christopher	Quinn Botfield / Desh Wilson & Miranda Cahill	Community (Labor Left/Democrats/Labor Right/Independents)

== Association of Postgraduate Students (APS) ==
In 2011, UQ postgraduate students formed a postgraduate collective within the UQU due to a departmental shuffle at the University; the UQ Association of Postgraduate Students has since rebranded as "UQU Association of Postgraduate Students (APS)". This new Union body has been in regular contact with The Council of Australian Postgraduate Associations (CAPA) and sent a representative to the 2011 CAPA annual conference in Sydney. APS caters to the needs of over 13,000 postgraduate students at the University of Queensland. The Association exists to promote a postgraduate community, promote postgraduate wellbeing and provide a voice for postgraduate students at UQ. All Postgraduate students at UQ are automatically members of the Association.

In 2021, the Union signed a Memorandum of Understanding with the University on a new model to govern and expand the Student Services and Amenities Fee (SSAF) at The University of Queensland; the MOU guarantees a set amount of student money to be provided to APS as a service provider alongside the Union, Student Services and UQ Sports.

In 2023, APS became an incorporated entity and a registered charity under "Association of Postgraduate Students Inc., The University of Queensland".

=== APS Presidents ===
Year	President(s)	Party
2014	Amanda Acutt	Reform (NLS/Labor Right)
2015	Aleen Kujur	Reform (NLS/Labor Right)
2016	Anna Safonova	Reform (NLS/Labor Right)
2017	Partha Narayan Mishra & Gustavo Chamusca de Azevedo	Reform (NLS/Labor Right)
2018	Elif Kaya	Focus (Labor Right/LNP)
2019	Selene Cannelli	Focus (Labor Right/LNP)
2020	Christian Rizzalli	Student Action
2021	Richard Lee & Betty Lin	Rebuild (NLS/Labor Right)
2022	William Triste	Global Mates
2023	Saumya Jain & Jeryn Chang	Global Mates
2024	Yash Koppula & Richard Lee	Global Mates
2025	Aadhya Babu & Hayden Mitt	Global Mates
2026	Hayden Mitt & Arnav Jajoo	Global Mates

== Student Collectives ==
Representing minority, special interest and other community groups on campus, UQU’s collectives serve as advocacy and social organisations for students. The collectives are managed by student elected committees.

=== Disability Collective ===
The Disability Collective is a peer support and advocacy group for students who identify as having a disability, chronic illness or mental health condition. The collective has rooms on campus as well as online communities which provide safe spaces for students to ask questions, connect with others, and access support and advocacy. The collective works with the university administration and teaching staff, and UQ’s Disability, Diversity and Inclusion Advisors (DDIA), to advocate for students, refer students to appropriate support services, and help students navigate life at university. All students who identify as someone who experience disability, chronic illness, mental illness, neurodiversity or deafness can automatically become a member of the collective.

=== Environment Collective ===
The Environment collective is a group of environmentalist students. It offers a platform to share ideas and contribute to UQU policy and encourage sustainable practices on campus, promoting greater awareness of, and increasing students’ interaction with Queensland’s native flora and fauna. The Environment Collective hosts a range of events throughout the year. All UQ students are open to become automatic members of the collective.

=== Goorie Berrimpa ===
Goorie Berrimpa meaning "Meeting Place" in the Turrbal language, is a UQU collective representing Aboriginal and Torres Strait Islander students at the University of Queensland. Goorie as the collective is commonly known by, aims to provide a sense of belonging for all Indigenous students studying at the University of Queensland and bring culture and education together. Goorie Berrimpa holds a number of events throughout the year including the annual NAIDOC Ball with guest speakers and performers; as well as NITESG (National Indigenous Tertiary Education Student Games) as well as beginning and ending Semester Socials. All UQ Students who identify as Indigenous or Torres Strait Islander have access to automatic membership to the collective.

=== International Collective ===
The UQU International Students Collective is a student collective within UQU, and is open to all international students and anyone interested in cultural diversity. The collective provides guidance and support for international students and advocates on behalf of international students to the University of Queensland. All international students as well as any UQ students interested in cultural diversity have access to automatic membership.

Year	International Officer(s)	Party
2016	Barani Ganapathi & Chao Chen	Reform (NLS/Labor Right)
2017	Barani Ganapathi & Wanwan Guo	Reform (NLS/Labor Right)
2018	NA	
2019	Tiantian Zhao &YunYing Su	International Students Assembly
2020	Sai Wai Yan	Empower
2021	Shirley Mo & Allen Ding	Rebuild (NLS/Labor Right)
2022	Sumiko Myo & Anna Li	Rebuild (NLS/Labor Right)
2023	Sandra Haya & Rita Zou	Global Mates
2024	Nandan Chalamalasetti & Grace Ge	Global Mates
2025	Grace Ge & Anshraj Srivastava	Global Mates
2025	August Gao & Tenzin Ksang	Global Mates

=== Queer Collective ===
The UQU Queer Collective (UQU QC) is a community group at the University of Queensland for members of the UQ LGBTQIA+ community. The UQU Queer Collective runs regular events and advocacy campaigns. All members of the UQ community who identify as queer and/or LGBTQIA+ are automatic members of the Queer Collective.

=== Women's Collective ===
The UQU Women’s Collective (UQU WC) is a women's group on the University of Queensland campus. The purpose of the Women’s Collective is to represent and advocate for women on campus through a range of events and campaigns. The UQU Women’s Collective aims to engage people with each other as feminists and feminist theory as a whole, run events and to raise consciousness and meets regularly to discuss feminist affairs. In addition, the Women’s collective regularly hosts events such as the annual International Women’s Day Breakfast, small social events, and networking opportunities and run campaigns to engage students on campus and educate people in regards to current feminist issues. All UQ Students who identify as women or non-binary have automatic membership to the collective.

== Politics ==
=== 1960s ===
In 1965, women students from the University of Queensland chained themselves to the bar of Treasury and Regatta hotel to protest against sex discrimination.

In 1966, the Vietnam Action Committee formed as a University-based Civil Liberties and Vietnam-oriented action group. At a footpath protest in March against the Vietnam War, 31 were arrested. Students later hosted a conference on South-East Asia at UQ organised by off-campus peace groups.

In May 1967, the Union’s Civil Liberties Coordinating Committee formed to fight restrictive sections of the Traffic Act. In June, the CLCC gave the government an ultimatum with a deadline of 11 July for sections of the Traffic Act to be repealed, but in July, the deadline was extended to 5 September, mainly due to negotiations the Student Union President and State Government.

On 4 September, Premier Frank Nicklin promised a decision on the ultimatum. A rally and march on this issue was postponed to 8 September. The Nicklin Government made an offer on the 7th, but it was found unsatisfactory. The following day, 4,000 people marched to the city. 2,000 of them sat down in Roma Street. 114 were arrested with police violence.

A demonstration was called by the Trades and Labour Council of Queensland to protest against police treatment of university students and staff in Roma Street, Brisbane during 8 September protest march.

=== 1970s ===
On 4 September 1977 Joh Bjelke-Petersen, the Premier of Queensland announced that "the day of the political street march is over. Anybody who holds a street march, spontaneous or otherwise, will know that they are acting illegally. Don’t bother to apply for a permit you won’t get one. That's Government policy now."

On 12 September 1977, the UQ Union marched on campus and was stopped at the gates of the University by 300 Queensland police officers. Some students walked along the footpath to a rally of 5,000 workers on Trade Union Rights. Wharf workers marched to the rally in Roma Street forum.

This was followed by a march on 22 September, which went off campus and regathered in King George Square. In total, seven people were arrested, including the Australian Union of Students’ representative at UQ. All but one of these had been attending meetings at the University of Queensland of the newly formed group to fight the ban. By that last arrest, 20 people had been arrested on the King George Square steps. Another 12 were arrested later at parliament house.

The women arrested were strip-searched in the watchhouse that night in the presence of male police. Maris, a young student and member of the CLCC, organised a defence for all the arrested people in the courts and a few were acquitted. This was the beginning of 3,000 arrests of 2,000 people (some were arrested on several occasions) and court appearances which would continue unabated for 2 years – every time there was a political street march.

From 4 September 1977 to July 1979 2,000 people were arrested, there were 3,000 arrests with the largest of 418 people being arrested in a single afternoon of 22 October 1977.

=== Establishment of Women's Collective ===
In 1977, the UQ Union, was the first student union in the country to appoint a part time paid Women’s Rights Organiser. An early campaign sought to get the Student Union to adopt policy supporting women’s abortion rights. A student referendum on the issue was unsuccessful at that time, though later the Union would adopt a pro-choice stance.

A campaign about women's safety on campus raised awareness of the prevalence of sexual assault and rape on campus – it was some years, however, before the university responded. The Women's Rights Committee also campaigned against sexual harassment of students by some academic and teaching staff. They campaigned successfully for the withdrawal of student union funding for a student club that printed a newsletter that incited violence against women and girls. They successfully called for the reinstatement by the Student Union of a woman cleaner who had been fired without sufficient reason.

"When the Women's Rights Room became too small for their meetings, the women asked the Union for a larger room. The request was refused so the women and a couple of supporters, occupied the room and moved the furniture."

=== 1990s to 2013 ===
1991–1992, the Union was run under the umbrella of the Liberal (or Young Liberal) party.

1994–2007, the Union was almost exclusively under the control of parties aligned with the Labor party, usually the left leaning wing. Liberal students regained full control for a single year in 1996 and won a majority of the split executive in 2003.

2008–2013, the Union was run by a party under the banner "Fresh" (Liberal National Party of Qld). During this time, UQU ends its accreditation with the National Union of Students, making it the first student association in the Group of Eight universities to have done so.

=== 2014 to 2023 (Post-Fresh Era) ===
2014–2017, the Union was run by Reform (a coalition of Labor's left and right factions), during which significant opposition came from Lift (independents) and Thrive (LNP).

On 14 September 2017, after intense divisions between Labor's Left and Right factions, the Reform ticket announced their disbanding. The Labor Right faction formed a separate, independent coalition supported by a faction of Young Liberals, as well as some Greens and Independent students, to contest the elections under a new ticket named Focus. The Labor Left faction attempted to continue as 'Reform', however, they failed to lodge their nominations correctly. Owing to some administrative errors, Reform's Union Council ticket did not appear above the line.

After the errors made during the nomination process, the Reform ticket announced on Facebook that they intended to withdraw from the contesting the 2017 Student Union Elections. In the same post, they endorsed the Socialist Alternative ticket 'Student Action'. The 'Reform' ticket remained on the ballot papers for the Union Executive and the Union Newspaper, but the ticket did not run a ground campaign during the elections. The newly formed 'Focus' ticket was elected in a landslide.

In 2018, the Labor Left faction re-formed as 'Momentum'.

A referendum was planned to be held simultaneously with the 2018 election, but was announced in a manner inconsistent with the regulations. The referendum was thus postponed, and held instead during the last week of exams, and a regulatory amendment made to allow voting online. However, of the 6383 votes counted, 2218 were "against" votes were submitted from a single non-University IP address, significantly contributing to none of the referendum questions passing. One of the questions of the referendum related to eligibility to hold positions for elected officers. Several students who had been elected were not eligible to hold office under the current constitution, but would have been had the question passed. As such, these students vacated their positions immediately upon assuming office at the conclusion of the Annual General Meeting. These vacancies lasted until the first meeting of the newly elected council.

In 2019, Labor Right split from the Focus deal, and attempted to create a new ticket with Labor Left. Near the close of nominations, the newly re-formed Labor group were advised that another electoral group had reserved their intended name, 'Together'. The Liberal faction within Focus successfully nominated under the name 'Real'. The Returning Officer extended the nominations deadline to allow the Labor group to resubmit their forms with a new name (they chose 'Empower'), but the campaign manager for the new 'Together' ticket appealed the decision to extend the nominations deadline, taking this appeal to the Electoral Tribunal. Labor were supported in defending against this appeal by their former Focus allies in 'Real', but the Electoral Tribunal found against both the major parties, and in favour of 'Together', finding that the regulations did not grant the Returning Officer the power to extend the nomination window. Empower campaigners began the election on a platform of Real having sabotaged the election, but soon changed tactics to a more clear-cut Below the Line campaign. Following voting week, the REAL executive ticket was elected in a landslide by a margin of 63% to 37%. This marked the first time in 6 years that no member of the Australian Labor Party held an elected position on the University of Queensland Union Executive.

In the 2022 student elections, Rebuild was elected to a third term in office and received its largest executive ticket majority with 62% of the primary vote and a 73% to 27% TPP split against the Young LNP-ran Together. This marks the largest single party primary vote since REAL's election in 2019 and the largest two-party preferred split since Fresh's infamous re-election in 2012.

In 2023 the UQ Union under the Rebuild administration officially re-accredited with the National Union of Students after the unions accreditation with NUS ended under Fresh in 2010.

=== 2023 to present (Global Mates Era) ===
In 2023, Rebuild split under a breakdown in communication between NLS and Labor Right, allegations were made against Labor Right of attempting to make backdoor deals with other electoral groups and undermining the yearly agreement signed between the two Labor factions that made up the crux of Rebuild. Other allegations were made against NLS for intentionally breaking down communication to force the hand of Labor Right to concede positions to the other faction. The split was made official at the close of nominations on 15 September when the Labor Right-held social media pages of Rebuild announced their rebranding to Unite and simultaneously kicked NLS members of the social media moderators off the pages. NLS announced their new joint executive ticket with prominent international and postgraduate ticket Global Mates called Reform, a deliberate strategy designed to capitalise on the branding success of Rebuild by retaining the 'Re' prefix. The LNP ticket Together also underwent a rebranding phase running under a previously used name called Lift. Reform secured a victory at the 2024 election with a 48% primary vote and a 59% to 41% TPP split against the Labor Right ticket Unite

The 2024 election would mark the first time in at least a decade at which Labor Right would not contest any student executive positions or run an executive ticket in their own right. Claims were made by some UQ Labor Right members that the factions priority was in campaigning for the ALP during the early voting period for the 2024 Queensland State Election, which coincided with the student election. An Instagram page titled 'UQ Taco Tuesday' which was heavily promoted by members of UQ Labor Right, was filed as a council ticket by members of NLS, SAlt and Labor Right. As NLS had filed the ticket first, they had claim to the usage of the naming rights, with SAlt filing their ticket 2 minutes after NLS, and Labor Right filing theirs 3 days after the previous two. The original Instagram page made posts claiming that the name 'Taco Tuesday' had been stolen by members of Labor Left and would run a campaign to inform students of this alleged fraud, noting that no appeal for the naming rights of 'Taco Tuesday' had been filed with the Electoral Tribunal. The previous years LNP ticket labelled 'Lift' would undergo another rebrand, as they would revert back to the ticket name 'Together'. In the 2024 election the Socialist Alternative ticket followed its national rebrand to "Left Action", running under the name "Left Action for Gaza". An independent ticket who endorsed the Reform executive ticket ran called "Muslim Students for Palestine" which focused on the issue of the Occupation Of Palestine and Invasion of Gaza, with their council ticket including and endorsing Global Mates, Reform and Spirit.

Reform went on to win the 2024 election, securing at least 60% of the primary vote and winning all executive positions. Despite the Reform ticket winning the election at large, Global Mates would secure the largest share of the council vote and become the largest party on the 114th UQ Union Council (2025).

Reform underwent a rebranding ahead of the 2025 election to Community, while largely maintaining the political alignments of Reform with a few additional independents. Community went on to win the election securing 37% of the primary vote and 62% of the 2PP vote, the lowest recorded primary vote of a winning party since a Labor-aligned ticket took control of the executive back in 2020.

The 2026 election saw an internal split between Labor Left within Community, which ended up with the creation of Defend and Change. Defend maintained the support of members of the outgoing executive, SAlt, Young Greens and Labor Right. While the splinter group Change was made up of other members of Labor Left. Defend went on to win 67.5% of the executive primary vote and majority of positions, however they did not win the position of President. As Chi Doan of Global Mates won as a below-the-line candidate, which is the first time in known history to have occurred. Although it should be mentioned that Doan was endorsed by Defend as their preferred presidential candidate and all Defend materials encouraged students to vote for Doan below-the-line.

== Union council composition ==
=== 2026 ===
The 2026 UQ Union Council is made up of 25 members from 10 electoral groups.

Party	Faction	Seats	Change
Community	Labor Left & Independents	6	▲3
Left Action for Gaza	Socialist Alternative	4	▲1
Lao Gan Ma	Young LNP & International Independents	3	▲3
Together	Young LNP & Independents	3	▲1
Global Mates	Postgrad & International Independents	2	▼7
Progressives	Queensland Young Greens	2	▲2
RAGE	Labor Right	2	Steady
Fight	Independents	1	▲1
Stacked!	Student Collective Independents	1	▲1
Yo-Chi on Campus	Young LNP	1	Steady
Total		25	

=== 2025 ===
The 2025 UQ Union Council is made up of 24 members from 9 electoral groups. Cara Rowe of Reform was elected Council Chair for 2025 at the first February Union Council Meeting.

Party	Faction	Seats	Change
Global Mates	Postgrad & International Independents	9	▲5
Reform	National Labor Students & Independents	3	▼3
Student Action	Socialist Alternative	3	Steady
Together	Young LNP	2	Steady
Muslim Students for Palestine	Independents	2	▲2
Drain The Swamp	Labor Right	2	▼3
Taco Tuesday	National Labor Students	1	▲1
Conservatives	Young LNP	1	Steady
Yo-Chi on Campus	Young LNP	1	▲1
Total		24	

=== 2024 ===
The 2024 UQ Union Council is made up of 23 members from 9 electoral groups. Cara Rowe of Reform was elected Council Chair for 2024 at the February Union Council Meeting.

Party	Faction	Seats	Change
Reform	National Labor Students	6	▲3
Unite	Labor Right	5	▲2
Global Mates	Postgrad & International Independents	4	▼1
Student Action	Socialist Alternative	3	▲1
Lift	Young LNP	1	▼4
Conservatives	Young LNP	1	Steady
WAP − Women's Action Party	Young LNP	1	Steady
Community	Postgrad & International Independents	1	▲1
Spirit	Independent	1	▲1
Total		23	

=== 2023 ===
The 2023 UQ Union Council is made up of 23 members from 8 electoral groups. Alex Smock of Rebuild was elected Council Chair for 2023 at the March Union Council Meeting.

Party	Faction	Seats	Change
Rebuild	National Labor Students/Labor Right	6	▼2
Together	Young LNP	5	▼3
Global Mates	Postgrad & International Independents	5	▲4
Student Action	Socialist Alternative	2	Steady
Black Flag	Anarchists	2	▲1
Conservatives	Young LNP	1	▲1
Legalise Weed	Young LNP	1	▼1
WAP − Women's Action Party	Young LNP	1	Steady
Total		23	

=== 2022 ===
The 2022 UQ Union Council was made up of 24 members from 8 electoral groups. Samuel Adams of Black Flag was elected Council Chair for 2022 at the February Union Council Meeting.

Party	Faction	Seats	Change
Rebuild	National Labor Students/Labor Right	8	▲3
Together	Young LNP	8	▲2
Legalise Weed	Young LNP	2	▲2
Student Action	Socialist Alternative	2	▼3
Black Flag	Anarchists	1	▲1
Global Mates	Postgrad & International Independents	2	▲1
WAP − Women's Action Party	Young LNP	1	▲1
Total		24	

=== 2021 ===
The 110th UQ Union Council is made up of 24 members from 7 electoral groups. Ji Davis was elected Council Chair for 2021 at the February Union Council Meeting.

Party	Faction	Seats	Change
Together	Young LNP/Independent Coalition	6	▲4
Rebuild	National Labor Students/Labor Right	5	▲5
Student Action	Socialist Alternative	5	Steady
Forward	Radical democracy	4	▲4
YOU	Independent	4	▲4
International Student Assembly	Postgrad & International Independents	2	▼3
M A-N Coalition	The Ablett-Nelsonists	1	▲1
Total		24	

=== 2020 ===
In 2020, the UQ Union Council was made up of 26 student representatives elected from six unique electoral groups, spanning five student factions.

Party	Faction	Seats	Change
REAL	Young LNP/Independent Coalition	10	▲10
International Student Assembly	Postgrad & International Independents	5	▲5
Student Action	Socialist Alternative	5	▲3
Empower	National Labor Students/Labor Right	3	▲3
Smokers' Rights/Revive/Activate/Together/Unite	Young Nationals	2	▲1
A Better Experience		1	▲1
Total		26	

=== 2019 ===
In 2019, the UQ Union Council was made up of 23 student representatives elected from five electoral groups, spanning from five different student factions, plus an independent.

Party	Faction	Seats	Change
Focus	Young LNP/Labor Right	11	
Momentum	National Labor Students	8	
Student Action	Socialist Alternative	2	
Smokers' Rights	Young Nationals	1	
Team Rocket	Independent	1	
Total		23	

== General Meetings of the Union ==
At the 2017 UQU Election, a coinciding referendum gave the union the power to hold large, open 'General Meetings'. According to the UQU Constitution, a meeting can be called by the Union Secretary if either directed to do so by a two-thirds majority of the Union Council, or if at least 2% of UQ Students sign a petition requisitioning such a meeting. General meetings also require at least 300 current students to attend in order for the meeting to be quorate.

C11.4 of the UQU Constitution states that:

"If fifty students present at a General Meeting require that a Referendum be held to determine any question which was to be considered by a General Meeting:

a) then the General Meeting must be immediately adjourned, until the Referendum can be held, without considering the question; and b) the Union Secretary must inform the Returning Officer who must give notice of a Referendum to consider the question".

=== 2019 General Meeting ===
On 29 May 2019, the union held a general meeting to consider the Union's position on the Ramsay Centre for Western Civilization establishing a relationship with UQ, and student control of the Schonell Theatre. The meeting was called after union council passed a resolution.

The questions put to the meeting were:

1. If a new theatre is to be developed to replace the current Schonell Theatre, should it continue to be run by the independent student union?
2. Should UQ accept a deal with The Ramsay Centre for Western Civilization?

Both resolutions were carried in the affirmative.

=== 2024 General Meeting ===
On 29 May 2024, 5 years to the day since the 2019 meeting, the union held another general meeting to consider the Union's position on University's ties to Israel. The meeting was held in the context of the Israel-Hamas war. Unlike the 2019 meeting, this meeting was called after the Union Secretary Alex Smock was petitioned by over 1300 UQ students.

The questions put to the meeting were:

1. That UQ should sever ties with companies that supply the Israeli Defence Force;
2. That UQ should shut down the Boeing Centre;
3. That UQ should financially divest from Israel.

The three resolutions were carried in the affirmative.

=== 2025 General Meeting ===
A meeting has been called for 3 September 2025, to consider the following questions:

1. Should students censure the Australian government for its complicity in the genocide in Gaza and demand an end to all weapons sales to Israel by Australia and Australian companies, and call for sanctions on Israel?
2. Should students call on all Australian universities to end their complicity with Israel’s genocide by ceasing all partnerships with weapons companies?

== Controversies ==
=== 2012 election ===
An anti-FRESH poster by D4UQU, calling a boycott of this election

In 2012, there was controversy surrounding the conduct of the annual student elections. The incumbents made rule changes that resulted in other teams submitting their nominations in an incorrect manner. This specifically related to last minute changes to union election rules removing the protection for previously used party names, which resulted in campaign material for opposition parties becoming unusable. This resulted in all other opposition parties (including "Pulse" and "I just want my voucher") having their names invalidated. These Allegations were denied by the current President.

Minutes and a recording from the 101st UQU Council meeting show that new regulations were brought in on 10 August. The recording shows that an objection was raised by Councillor Flynn Rush on procedural fairness and constitutional grounds, though this was circumvented through amending the factual basis for the objection. The incumbents did not give the requisite 5 'clear days' notice as per the UQU constitution. The regulation changes went ahead regardless. They were not available until elections and nominations opened.

The 2012 union president stated that members of the Pulse party "can complain all they want" but had 12 months notice on the introduction of new regulations on the use of registered ticket names, and that the 'last-minute' changes to the regulations were to different provisions (namely the timing of the electoral process to reduce it from 4 weeks to 3 as well as adding an entirely new process/form for nominations).

In response to the situation, an activist group titled 'DEMOCRACY 4 UQU' was started by a number of Fresh opposition groups concerned about how the measures introduced affected the student elections. Their goal was to correct what they perceive to be an unbalanced and unfair election process.

UQ deputy Vice-Chancellor (academic) Professor Mick McManus, said in response to the situation that UQ was concerned that this issue had a significant impact on students and would be considered in full and addressed appropriately, and that the university would work to resolve the issues. On 22 August, the University announced that the current union administration would be required to provide access to the constitution and changes to it, financial reports, and notices and minutes of meetings held under the current union on its website. Graeme Orr, Professor of Law at the University of Queensland, has pointed out in a radio interview that the power of the electoral tribunal convened to assess whether the elections were held properly was limited only to whether or not the electoral rules were violated, not whether they are valid or were created in accordance to union policy.

On 24 August, the University declared that in line with their funding agreement with the University Of Queensland Student Union, they would carry out an audit into the management of finances.

On 29 August, hundreds of students gathered at UQ's great court to protest against Fresh and call for democracy.

On 3 December, the annual general meeting of the UQU was cancelled after those calling it neglected to inform students and most members of their own executive, resulting in too few people present for the meeting to be quorate. An outgoing Vice-President, who had defected to an opposition political ticket, spoke briefly about the conduct of FRESH, raising concerns that the locking out of the opposition tickets was an act of hypocrisy given that FRESH made multiple electoral reforms early in their term to improve electoral participation.

== Notable alumni ==
The UQU has produced a number of notable alumni including Governors-General of Australia, CEOs, Chief Justices of Australia, State Premiers and Federal Parliamentarians

- Sir Thomas Groom, UQU President 1928, Lord Mayor of Brisbane
- Sir Harry Gibbs GCMG, AC, KBE, QC, UQU President 1936, 8th Chief Justice of the High Court
- Sir Walter Campbell AC QC, UQU President 1942, 21st Governor of Queensland, Supreme Court Judge, Chancellor of the University of Queensland
- Barry Murphy, UQU President 1963, CEO of Caltex
- Anna Bligh, UQU Women's Officer 1981, 37th Premier of Queensland, National President of the Australian Labor Party
- Paul Lucas (politician), UQU Treasurer 1983, 31st Deputy Premier and Attorney General of Queensland.
- Robert Wensley, UQU President, Deputy Chancellor of the University of Queensland.
- Fleur Kingham, UQU President 1983, UQU Secretary 1982, Queensland District Court Judge.
- Jillann Farmer, UQU President 1986, Medical Director of the United Nations
- Murray Watt, UQU President 1994, QLD Labor Senator and Albanese Government Minister
- Jenny McAllister, UQU Secretary 1994, National President of the Australian Labor Party, NSW Labor Senator and Albanese Government Minister
- Lisa Chesters, UQU Secretary 2002, Federal Member of Parliament for Bendigo
- Michael Wright, UQU Treasurer 2004, National Secretary of the Electrical Trades Union
- Julie-Ann Campbell, UQU President 2007, QLD Labor Party State Secretary, Federal Member of Parliament for Moreton
- Ben Riley, UQU Treasurer 2008, Liberal National Party State Director
- Matthew Chadwick, UQU Campus Culture Vice President 2008, Liberal National Party Deputy State Director
- Max Chandler-Mather, Semper Floreat Chief Editor 2014, Former Federal Member of Parliament for Griffith
- Joshua Millroy, UQU President 2014, Head of Organising for the Transport Workers Union QLD

== See also ==
- Union College
- University of Queensland Intercollege Council
- UQU Schonell Theatre
- National Association of Australian University Colleges
- Semper Floreat
