= UQU =

UQU or Uqu may refer to:

- Umm al-Qura University, a university in Saudi Arabia, Founded in the year 1950
- University of Queensland Union, a university student organization in Australia
- Unquadunium, an unsynthesized chemical element with atomic number 141 and symbol Uqu
