= Edgar Holt =

Edgar Holt may refer to:

- Edgar Holt (American football), American football coach
- Edgar George Holt, Australian journalist
