= Cecil Hadgraft =

Australian academic and literary critic

- Born: 8 June 1904; Moonee Ponds, Victoria, Australia
- Died: 19 February 1987 (aged 82); Brisbane, Queensland, Australia
- Education: University of Queensland; University of Melbourne
- Spouse: Jessie Hartley (m. 1933)

Cecil Harry Huddlestone Hay Hadgraft (8 June 1904 – 19 February 1987) was an Australian academic and literary critic. He was a senior lecturer and reader in literature at the University of Queensland, with a particular interest in the early years of Australian literature.

== Early life and education ==
Hadgraft was born on 8 June 1904 in Moonee Ponds, Victoria. As a child he moved to Rockhampton, Queensland, where he attended Rockhampton Grammar School and was mentored by Henry Kellow. He entered the University of Queensland in 1922 and was editor of the student magazine Galmahra in 1924. He eventually graduated Bachelor of Arts in 1929 and was awarded first-class honours in 1931 with a thesis on "aspects of the mock-heroic in English verse and drama to 1781". He completed a Master of Arts in 1937.

== Career ==
Hadgraft worked as a schoolteacher at Rockhampton Grammar School (1925–1930), Wolaroi College (1932–1933) and Ipswich Grammar School (1934–1949). He was also an education officer in the Royal Australian Air Force (RAAF) from 1942 to 1946 and was awarded a Bachelor of Education by the University of Melbourne in 1946 for a thesis on adult education.

In 1948, Hadgraft joined the University of Queensland's English department teaching evening classes. He was promoted to assistant lecturer in 1950, lecturer in 1955, and senior lecturer in 1958. Appointed reader in 1962, he was responsible for the introduction of the university's first courses in Australian literature. He retired in 1974 but continued on as an honorary lecturer. Hadgraft was awarded a John Hay Whitney Foundation scholarship in 1956, allowing him to conduct research at the University of Nebraska at Omaha and Louisiana State University.

=== Works ===
Hadgraft was "committed to the study of Australian literature", particularly that of the 19th century. His books included Queensland and Its Writers (1959), Australian Literature: A Critical Account to 1955 (1960), and James Brunton Stephens (1969). He was editor of two anthologies of Australian short stories and oversaw the republication of works by Henry Savery, Frederick Sinnett, and Jessie Couvreur. His 1987 anthology The Short Story Before Lawson was praised for countering the "orthodox" claim that Henry Lawson had established the Australian short story tradition. Hadgraft also authored ten entries in the Australian Dictionary of Biography between 1967 and 1983.

== Personal life ==
Hadgraft married fellow schoolteacher Jessie Hartley in 1933, with whom he had two children. He died in Brisbane on 19 February 1987 at the age of 82.
