= Young Nationals (Australia) =

Youth division of the National Party of Australia

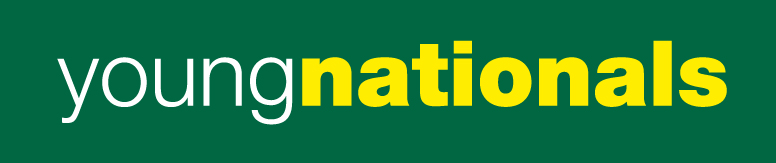
- President: Charlie Plant
- Founded: 1957
- Headquarters: Barton, Australian Capital Territory
- Ideology: Liberal conservatism; Agrarianism
- Position: Centre-right
- Mother party: National Party of Australia
- International affiliation: International Young Democrat Union
- Website: youngnationals.org

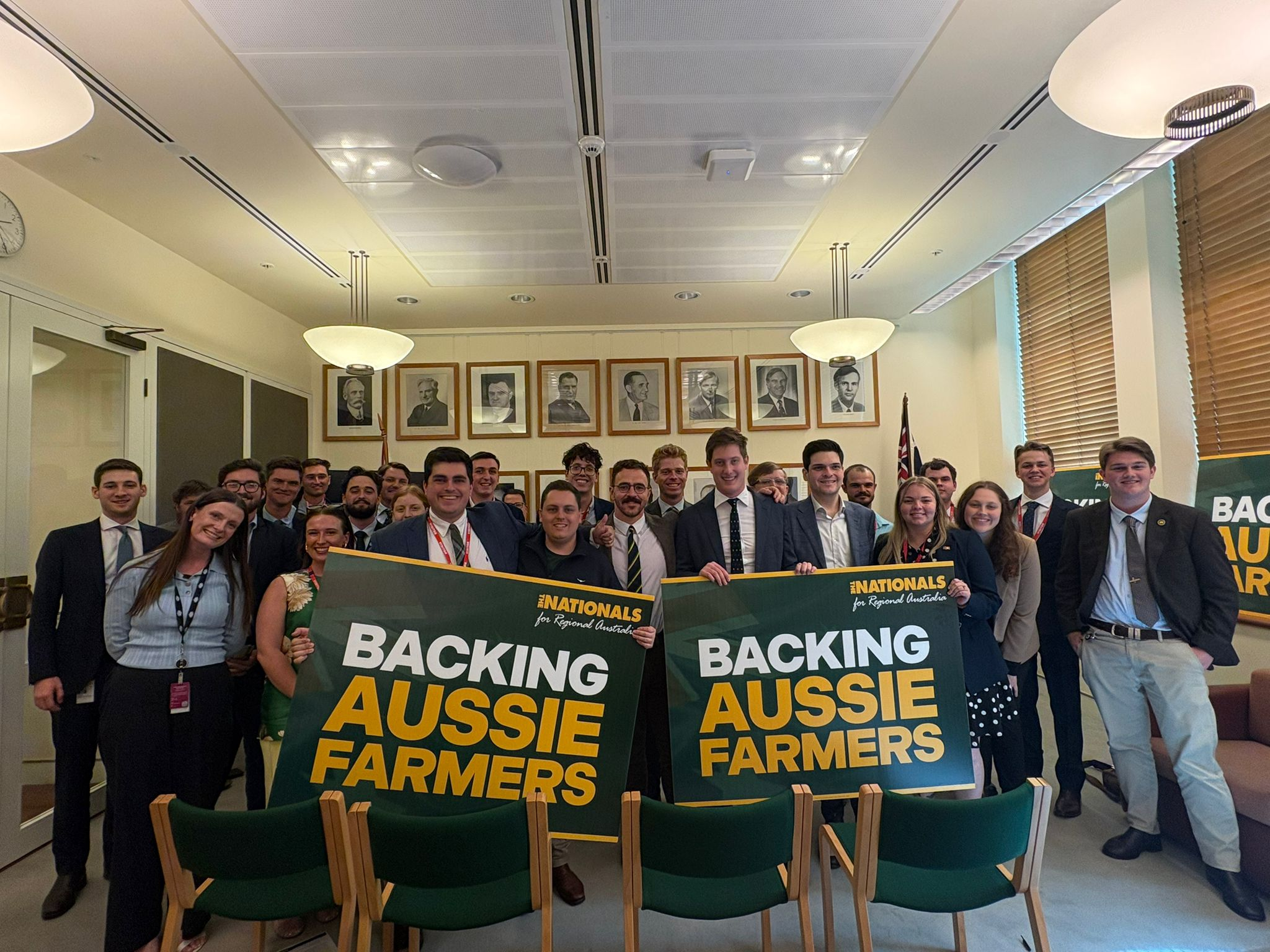
Young Nationals at 2025 Federal Council in Canberra

The Young Nationals is the youth division of the National Party of Australia, with membership open to those between 15 and 35 years of age. Young Nationals also have full party membership, and partake in state and federal conferences with equal rights to members of the senior party. They are active in National Party campaigning during all state and federal elections. It was first formed in Queensland in 1957, with other states following in subsequent years.

The movement is predominantly organised on the state division level, with each state organising its own events and policy as well as electing its own executive. In 2007 the Queensland Division of the Liberal Party of Australia and the Queensland National Party merged to become the Liberal National Party of Queensland (A division of the Federal Liberal Party and an affiliate of the Federal National Party). As part of this merger process, the Queensland Young Liberals and the Queensland Young Nationals were merged to become the Young Liberal National Party (Young LNP). The Young LNP is effectively the Queensland division of both the federal Young Liberals and the federal Young Nationals, and is the largest division of each of these movements. The federal executive of the Young Nationals comprises members elected from delegations from each affiliated state Young Nationals organisation, and the President of each affiliate. Policy can also be adopted by the movement's federal body. These policies are often then advocated by the Federal Young Nationals on the floor of the Federal Council of the National Party of Australia, as well as in representations made directly to members of parliament.

== Political impact ==
Since the mid-2000s, the Young Nationals have had an increasingly significant impact on National Party policy development and campaign efforts. The Young Nationals notably changed the party platform to oppose any form of mandatory ISP-level internet censorship in 2010 and have also expressed strong federalist sentiments, having spearheaded a push to abolish the national curriculum. In 2015 the NSW division of the Young Nationals also voted on a motion to support same-sex marriage and free votes on the issue. The movement has also been one of the stronger elements in the National Party that has expressed support for voluntary student unionism (VSU), eventually persuading Senator Fiona Nash to ditch the parliamentary party's opposition to VSU.

== Current federal executive ==
Position	Office-bearer	State
President	Charlie Plant	Queensland (LNP)
Vice-President	Emma Baillie	Northern Territory (CLP)
Secretary	Nick McCann	New South Wales
Treasurer	Mia Geddes	New South Wales
Policy Officer	Perrin Rennie	South Australia
Campaigns Officer	Filomena Peoples	New South Wales
Universities Officer	Leo Nash	Queensland
Publicity Officer	Sebastian Padget	Queensland (LNP)
Immediate Past President	Angus Webber	New South Wales
New South Wales Chair	Samuel Barry	
Victorian President	Callum Moscript	
Northern Territory President (CLP)	Zac Webster	
Queensland President (LNP)	Josie Drum	
South Australian President	Ryan Jellesma	
Western Australian President	Bronwyn Eatts	

== Past presidents ==
Ordinal	Year	President	State	Notes
1	1968	The Hon. Mike Ahern AO, FTSE	Queensland	Subsequently the Member for Landsborough and Premier of Queensland
2	1975–1976	Gary Pike	Queensland	
3	1976–1977	Garry West	New South Wales	Subsequently the Member for Orange and Minister in the Greiner and Fahey coalition governments
4	1977–1979	The Hon. Pat McNamara	Victoria	Subsequently the Member for Benalla and Deputy Premier of Victoria in the Kennett coalition government
5	1979–1981	Michael Behan	Queensland	
6	1981–1983	Nigel Smith	New South Wales	
7	1983–1985	Gerard Walsh	Queensland	
8	1985–1987	Julian Anderson	Queensland	
9	1987–1988	Judy Brewer	Victoria	Nationals candidate for the seat of Benambra in the 1988 Victorian State election. Later the wife of former Deputy Prime Minister and Nationals leader Tim Fischer and appointed Life Member of the Young National Party of Australia in 1994.
10	1988–1989	Aldo Borgu	Queensland	
11	1989–1991	Angus Calder	New South Wales	
12	1991-1993	Duncan Anderson	Western Australia	
13	1993-1994	Daniel Kelliher	Victoria	
14	1994–1996	Meredith Dickie	Victoria	Later the State Director of the Victorian Nationals 2002-2005
15	1996–1997	Donald Burnett	Queensland	
16	1997–1998	Douglas Doyle	New South Wales	
17	1998–1999	Robert Macaulay	New South Wales	
18	1999–2000	Stuart Copeland	Queensland	Subsequently the Member for Cunningham and State Director of the Victorian National Party
19	2001–2002	Scott Mitchell	Victoria	Subsequently the Federal Director of the National Party
20	2002–2004	Tim Dixon	New South Wales	
21	2004–2006	Chris Kahler	Queensland	
22	2006–2008	Damian Callachor	New South Wales	Subsequently the Chief of Staff to Deputy Prime Minister Michael McCormack
23	2008–2009	The Hon. Martin Aldridge MLC	Western Australia	Subsequently a Member for the Agricultural region
24	2009–2011	The Hon. Sarah Mitchell MLC	New South Wales	Subsequently a Member of the New South Wales Legislative Council and Minister in the Berejiklian coalition government
25	2011–2014	Cr Cameron O'Neil	Queensland	Subsequently Vice President of the LNP and elected to the Maranoa Regional Council
26	2014–2018	Ruby Cameron	Victoria	Nationals Candidate for Western Victoria Region in the 2010 Victorian State Election
27	2018–2019	Daniel Banks	Northern Territory	
28	2019–2022	Alessia Maruca	Queensland	
29	2022-2025	Angus Webber	New South Wales	
30	2025-	Charlie Plant	Queensland	

== Criticism and Controversy ==
Whilst serving as NSW Young Nationals chairman, Jessica Price-Purnell and two other NSW Young Nationals staffers reportedly embarked on an 'emotional' rampage inflicting substantial damage on the party's Orange campaign office during the 2016 Orange state by-election, which included a hole being punctured in the wall, with party state director Nathan Quigley expressing concern for the mental health of the three women, all of whom admitted responsibility for the vandalism and paid compensation for the damage.

In 2018, it was revealed that the NSW Young Nationals had been infiltrated by a number of neo-Nazis and other far-right extremists. Senior Party figures, including Federal Leader Michael McCormack denounced these attempts, stating that "The Nationals will not tolerate extremism or the politics of hate. People found to engage with such radicalism are not welcome in our party". The leader of the NSW Nationals, John Barilaro, also denounced racism and fascism within the party.

As a result of these revelations, the NSW National Party terminated the memberships of 19 members. The expelled members were found to have held links to a number of far-right organisations including the New Guard (not to be confused with the New Guard of the 1930s), the Lads Society, Antipodean Resistance, Squadron 88, and the Dingoes.
