= Schonell Theatre =

Theatre and cinema in Brisbane, Australia

Coordinates: 27°29′49.5″S 153°00′55.1″E

Entrance of Schonell Theatre

The Schonell Cinema & Live Theatre is a venue for theatre, special events and cinema screenings in Brisbane, Australia. It consists of Theatre One: a 420-seat, single auditorium theatre capable of hosting musical performances, plays and lectures and Cinema 2, a 175-seat cinema suitable for exclusive screenings, presentations and small performances.

The Schonell Cinema & Theatre has ceased weekly film sessions as of Monday 5 June 2017 and is now exclusively available for private hire.

== History ==
It is situated in the UQU complex at the University of Queensland's St Lucia campus. The theatre was constructed in 1970 and underwent refurbishment in 2005. It is owned and operated by the University of Queensland Union (UQU).

For three decades, the theatre hosted regular screenings of popular, alternative, and foreign motion pictures. On 24 June 2006, however, Schonell Theatre was forced to cease regular cinema screenings of major motion pictures. Film began again in 2008, with screenings from Thursday to Monday in Cinema 2.Schonell Theatre remains an important part of campus culture and the theatre community. Live theatre performances are extensive and ongoing throughout the year. The Schonell is home to the popular gourmet pizza café.

The theatre was constructed in 1970 and was renovated in 2005 with $4 million provided by the University of Queensland Union (UQU). Shows during its history include the Brisbane Scouts Gang Show, Home of Strangers and Rent. It was named after Fred Schonell, a previous Vice-Chancellor of the university.

== Closure ==
The Schonell Theatre closed its regular cinema operations on the 24 June 2006. The University of Queensland Union (UQU) cited low attendance rates, the increasing cost of airing major motion pictures and the introduction of Voluntary Student Unionism (VSU) as the cause. Following the introduction of VSU, the union could no longer afford to subsidise the failing Theatre.

In 2008 the Schonell re-commenced regular screenings of films again. Arthouse, foreign language, Australian films and independent releases are screened from Thursdays through to Mondays (closed public holidays). The theatre is still used for live theatre productions, university lectures, and is available for booked special screenings and events.

The Cement Box Theatre has recently been refurbished and renamed the Geoffrey Rush Drama Studio. This venue is now used by the university as a teaching space.

In 2018 the University of Queensland announced a development plan that does not include the theatre causing widespread concern amongst the student body, alumni and the local community. A petition was launched by then UQ Union Vice President Nicholas Comino seeking to "save the Schonell" from the university's plans.

In 2019, The Schonell Theatre will not be added to the historical list of the state at the University of Queensland, indicating that it would ultimately be destroyed. As part of its $300 million renovation project, the university intended to demolish the UQ Union building that includes the Schonell Theatre. The theatre was temporarily closed in May 2021 for asbestos dust removal and essential electrical and fire-safety assessments, and on 29 March 2022, the UQ Union and UQ made a joint announcement indicating that the theatre would not be demolished, as they did not have community support.

== See also ==
- University of Queensland
- University of Queensland Business Association
- University of Queensland Union (UQU)
