= Semper Floreat =

University of Queensland student newspaper

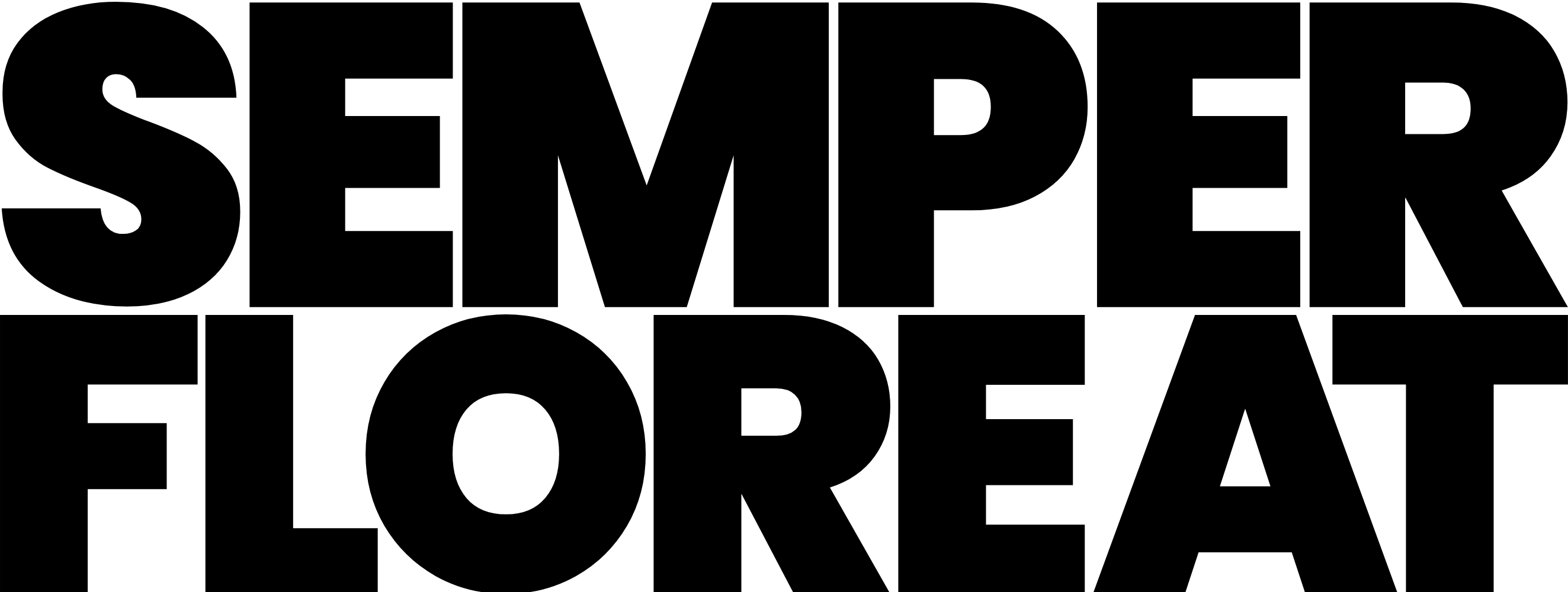
- The current logo since 2026.
- Chief Editor: Rudolf Braasch
- Deputy Chief Editors: Catherine Maher, Jana Hassan, & Kyall Mills
- Specialist: Asghar Masood
- Editors: Bree Benbow, Cass Hayward, Jack Barringer, Matilda Davies, & Patrick Franco
- Categories: Politics Youth Arts
- Frequency: Monthly
- First issue: 1932
- Company: University of Queensland Union
- Country: Australia
- Language: English
- Website: semperfloreat.com.au

Semper Floreat (Latin: "May it always flourish") is the student newspaper of the University of Queensland, in Brisbane, Australia. It has been published continuously by the University of Queensland Union (UQ Union) since 1932, when it began as a fortnightly newsletter of only a few pages, produced by one editor.

== Recent History ==
In 2014, Semper (as it is colloquially known) became a 48-page, monthly magazine that employs a full-time editor, deputy editor and 8 part-time editors The editors are elected annually by the student body. In 2017, Semper reduced its magazine publications to three for the year, and relaunched its website.

Semper occupied an important position in Brisbane's cultural and radical history, and has been closely connected with such cultural icons such as 'Time Off'. Semper editor, Alan Knight (1973), was a founding Director of 4ZZZ FM (1975). A number of important Australian writers, critics, historians and social commentators have been associated with the newspaper including David Malouf (writer, poet), Joan Kerr (art and cultural historian, academic), Jack Carmody (Professor of Medicine, opera and theatre critic), Shane Porteous (actor), Alan Frost (historian), Graeme Rowlands (poet and critic), William Yang aka Willie Young (photographer), Peter McCawley (economist, senior civil servant, Asia specialist), Brian Toohey (economist, newspaper editor, political commentator), Michael O'Neill (political activist), Dan O'Neill (academic and political activist), Susan Geason (journalist, political adviser, writer), Lenore Taylor (Walkley-winning journalist, author, now editor of Guardian Australia), Julianne Schultz, John Birmingham, Clinton Walker and Humphrey McQueen. In 2005 its editors included Daniel and Sarah Spencer, who went on to form the influential underground rock band Blank Realm.

The University of Queensland Fryer Library holds the most complete collection of the newspaper and archival issues are available through UQ eSpace; copies are also held in the State Library of Queensland, the Queensland Parliamentary Library, and the National Library of Australia in Canberra. Archival issues are also available from UQ eSpace.

The first student magazine for the university was called Queensland University Magazine (later known as Galmahra). It continued to publish alongside Semper Floreat until the 1950s.

== Art of Shoplifting controversy ==
In 1995, Semper reprinted a controversial article from Rabelais Student Media, its La Trobe University counterpart, entitled 'The Art of Shoplifting' – one of seven student newspapers to do so. Although the Rabelais editors responsible for the original article were prosecuted for ignoring a ban on publication issued by the state's Chief Censor; the editors of the other seven newspapers were not targeted by the authorities. Charges against the Rabelais editors were later dropped.

A similar article appearing in the August 2022 edition of Semper, this time called “the Subtle Art of Shoplifting”, made headlines internationally. Its anonymous author rehashed some of the points made by the original article, as well as adding some modern techniques to circumvent the increasing sophistication and technological expansion of security. Australian networks such as Newscorp, Seven, Fairfax, and the ABC ultimately criticised the publication for its promotion of criminal behaviour.

== See also ==
- University of Queensland Union (UQU)
- University of Queensland
