= Home of Strangers =

- Directed by: Doan Nguyen
- Written by: Doan Nguyen
- Produced by: Owen Seamons; Doan Nguyen
- Starring: Jimmy Huynh
- Cinematography: Geoff Saville
- Edited by: Geoff Saville; Doan Nguyen; Dan Corbet
- Release date: 1 August 2009
- Country: Australia
- Language: English

Home of Strangers is the first feature film from writer and director Doan Nguyen. The film was released at the Schonell Theatre, Brisbane, Australia, on 1 August 2009.

== Plot ==
Home of Strangers is a story of three individuals whose unique paths cross unexpectedly – who are led on a journey to resolve their own personal conflicts and learn about the importance of relationship.

Ben is a young Vietnamese Californian gangster. He escapes the unfulfillable demands and violence of a criminal life and flees to Brisbane. In this quiet town Ben is offered a friendship, a lover and a family. Ben soon realises that he cannot outrun his past as Dean, the gangs leader, comes to reclaim his most prized asset.

The young and innocent Vietnamese girl Lien is placed out of her comfort zone as she travels to Australia to attend university and make her family proud. But her experiences are far from what she anticipated, and she must keep the reality of her situation from her parents.

Chavonne has just left one of her many relationships. She dreams of one day finding genuine love. She shoulders the weight of responsibility at home, looking after her younger sister and alcoholic father after the death of her mother.

== Cast ==
- Jimmy Huynh as Ben Huynh
- Nicole Pritchard as Chavonne de Lorme
- Kare Truong as Lien Pham
- Lindy Morrison as Chavonne's grandma

== Details ==
The film was self-financed by Doan Nguyen, and everyone involved was a volunteer as there was no money to pay them. Many of those involved were students who wanted to get experience in movie making, without having to move to another city.

Home of Strangers is the first Brisbane-based cross-cultural film produced by Passage Entertainment in Brisbane.

The movie also raised funds in support of a Vietnamese orphanage through the Que Huong Charity.
