= Queensland University Magazine =

The Queensland University Magazine, later known as Galmahra (after the Indigenous name of Jackey Jackey), was first published in 1911, the same year that the University of Queensland was established. It was a publication of the Student Union.

The first issues were designed with the purpose of “building up University life and chronicling term by term, events of common interest”. In 1920, the magazine changed its name to Galmahra, reflecting a change in the mood of the student body, and certainly of its editorial board. The new name, from the Aboriginal word for “poet, seer, teacher or philosopher amongst the tribes”, suggested “a poetic expression of the spirit of this sunlit-sombre land in which we live” as well as respect for the famous guide of the Kennedy expedition of 1948, known as Jackey Jackey. As well as publishing news relating to the university, it also featured literary articles, reviews, short fiction and verse, some of which was not contributed by undergraduates. It was hoped that the publication would inspire local poets, both of the university and outside to contribute material.

Several years of discord between the editors of the magazine and the conservative Senate of the university, almost led to the cancellation of the magazine in 1925. In 1932, the student's weekly newspaper, Semper Floreat was first published, and Galmahra eventually became an annual magazine. It was suspended between 1951 and 1959, and again from 1969. Some of the featured poetry included works by Judith Wright, Val Vallis, David Rowbotham and David Malouf.

== Editors ==
Year	Editor
1911	A. S. Fielding
1912	A.S. Fielding
1913	H. W. Dinning
1914	A. H. Jones
1915	C. R. Wonderley
1916	T. Thatcher and A.E. Pearse
1917	Geo. Cooling
1918	T. Thatcher
1919	J. Lindsay
1920	I. F. Jones
1921	P. R. Stephensen
1922	W. J. Chamberlain and John Denis Fryer
1923	Colin Bingham
1924	Cecil Hadgraft
1925	Colin Bingham
1926	Edgar George Holt
1927	Frederick William Whitehouse
1928	Rhys Jones
1929	J. G. Harrison
1930	W.A.L.T. Hyde
1931	N.C. Tritton
1932	S.L. Russell
1933	M. E. Freeman
1934	E.T.S. Pearce
1935	J. H.P. Ryan
1936	E.J. Ritchie and J.H. Richardson
1937	H.T. Gibbs
1938	John Sachs
1939	Donald MacFarlane
1940	R. A. Beven
1941	R. Mathews
1942	Peter Miles
1943	No issue published
1944	Lucius Allen
1945	A.M. Hertzberg
1946	R.B. McIntyre
1947	G. Watson
1948	D.H. Rowbotham
1949	Bert Cornelius
1950	John Quinlem
1960	Dan O’Neill
1963	A.B ("Barry") Baker and John Carmody
1968	David Murr
