= Edgar George Holt =

Australian journalist

Edgar George Holt (27 December 1904 Burnley, Lancashire, England – 11 October 1988 Sydney), was a journalist who wrote for many Australian newspapers. In 1950, he joined the Liberal Party of Australia Federal Secretariat in a public relations role.

== Early life ==
The Holt family emigrated to Brisbane in 1916. After his initial education at Brisbane State High School, he joined the staff of The Telegraph, and enrolled at the newly introduced Diploma of Journalism at University of Queensland. He edited the student newspaper Galmahra.

== Down south ==
In September 1929 Holt joined the Melbourne Argus, and later the Melbourne Evening Star until it collapsed. In 1935 Holt joined the Melbourne Herald as a special and leader-writer. In 1940 he joined the Daily Telegraph as a journalist, and rose to be their literary editor. He joined Smith's Weekly in 1944, and was editor from 1947 until 1950 when it ceased publication.

He was heavily involved in Australian Journalists' Association.

== Bibliography ==
- Holt and Colin Bingham, The Merlin Papers, 1929. poetry, twenty-five copies.
- Lilacs Out of the Dead Land, Melbourne : Transition Press, 1932. OCLC 10886165 poetry, three hundred copies.
- Anzac Reunion (1937), a one-act play
- Two Australian poets
- Politics is people; the men of the Menzies era, Angus and Robertson [1969] ISBN 0-207-95170-5

=== Audio ===
- Edgar Holt reads poetry (1960; sound recording), interviewed by Hazel de Berg
- Interview with Edgar Holt (sound recording), with Mel Pratt
