= Young LNP =

Youth wing of the LNP in Australia

- President: Benjamin Kozji
- Vice President: Ryan McDonald (Metro), Hannah Treston (Regional)
- Treasurer: Luke Allen
- Founded: 2008
- Merger of: Queensland Young Liberals; Queensland Young Nationals
- Headquarters: Albion, Queensland
- Ideology: Classical liberalism; Liberal conservatism; Agrarianism
- Position: Centre-right
- Mother party: Liberal National Party of Queensland
- National affiliation: Liberal Party of Australia; National Party of Australia
- Website: www.ylnp.org

The Young Liberal National Party, also known simply as Young LNP and abbreviated as YLNP, is the youth division of the Liberal National Party of Queensland, and membership is open to those between 16 and 30 years of age. It exists only in Queensland, and is affiliated both with the federal Young Liberal Movement and the federal Young Nationals.

The Young LNP aims to provide a setting for young people aged between 16 and 30 to express their political views and contribute to the shaping of Queensland's political landscape. They provide the LNP with new ideas and policies designed to keep the Party in touch with mainstream youth.

== History ==
The Young LNP was founded in 2008, following the merger of Liberal and National parties in Queensland. The Young LNP's history dates back to the founding of the Queensland Young Liberals in 1949, by Sir James Killen, and the Queensland Young Nationals in 1958. The Young LNP recognises the contribution of Sir James Killen to youth politics by holding an annual public speaking competition in his name.

== Current Executive ==
The executive of the Young LNP is elected by branch delegates at the Young LNP Convention held each year.

== Elected officials ==
Name	Constituency	Government
Lisa Atwood	Councillor for Doboy Ward	Brisbane City Council
Ryan Murphy	Councillor for Chandler Ward	Brisbane City Council
Sam O'Connor	Member for Bonney	Queensland Parliament
Bryson Head	Member for Callide	Queensland Parliament

== Branches ==
The Young LNP is made up of local branches, which are spread across the state from the Gold Coast in the south to Cairns in the north. The branch is the basic party unit and it is in branches that most Young LNP activities take place. Members of the Young LNP are all members of a branch of their choice located in their region. Branches meet regularly, have social functions, assist in election campaigns, debate policy, and are self-governed by their own executive committees. The following is a list of the branches which make up the Young LNP:

- Bowman YLNP
- Brisbane Central YLNP
- Brisbane North YLNP
- Capricornia YLNP (Rockhampton)
- Dawson YLNP (Mackay)
- Far North Queensland YLNP (Cairns)
- Gold Coast YLNP
- Lilley YLNP
- Moreton YLNP
- Northern YLNP (Townsville)
- Ryan YLNP
- South Brisbane YLNP
- South West Queensland YLNP
- Sunshine Coast YLNP
- West Brisbane YLNP
- Wide Bay YLNP
