= Young Liberals (Australia) =

Political youth organisation of Liberal Party

Young Liberal Movement
- President: Cooper Gannon (NSW)
- Vice President: Hannah Hutton (WA)
- Founded: 12 December 1945; 80 years ago
- Preceded by: Young Nationalists Organisation
- Headquarters: R. G. Menzies House
- Ideology: Liberal conservatism
- Position: Centre-right
- Mother party: Liberal Party of Australia
- International affiliation: International Young Democrat Union
- Website: youngliberal.org.au

The Young Liberal Movement of Australia, commonly referred to as the Young Liberals, is the youth movement of the Liberal Party of Australia representing members aged 16 to 31. It is organised as a federation with each state and territory division responsible for their own campaigns, policy platform and strategic direction and interact federally via the Federal Young Liberal Executive.

The movement serves as a recruiting platform, contributes a significantly within the volunteer base and undertakes a notable management role within the Liberal Party. Young Liberal Presidents serve on the executive of their respective State and Territory divisions, while the Federal President and Federal Vice-President of the movement serve on the Federal Liberal Executive.

Former Federal Presidents include former "Father of the House" and NSW Liberals State President Philip Ruddock, former Chief Economist for Bank of America Merrill Lynch, Saul Eslake, Businessman Mark Birrell, and former Minister for Foreign Affairs Marise Payne. The organisation is a founding member of the International Young Democrat Union. The incumbent Patron of the Movement is Senator Jonno Duniam.

== History ==
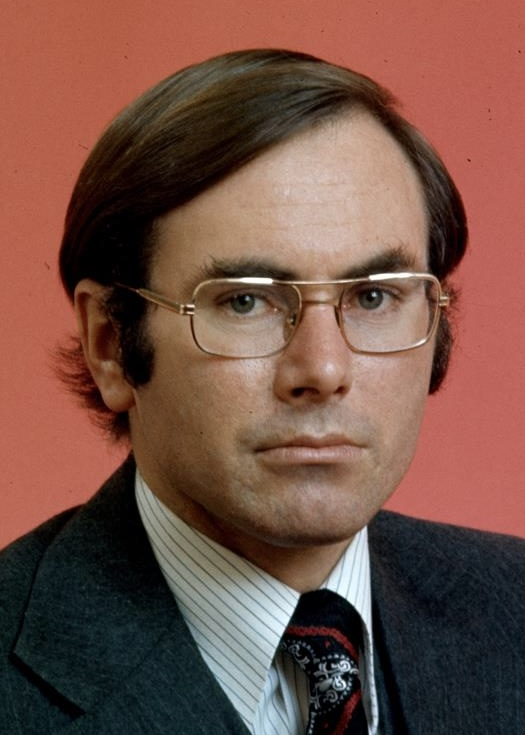
John Howard (pictured in 1974) served as State President of the NSW Young Liberals from 1962 to 1964

The Young Liberal Movement was formed on 12 December 1945 following the official inauguration of the Liberal Party on 31 October that same year. The creation of the movement is attributed to Sir Robert Menzies who when organising meetings to discuss the creating of the Liberal Party in 1944 invited the Young Nationalists to undertake a prominent role within the new party. The formation of the movement at a meeting at the Melbourne Town Hall attracted 750 people.

While Young Liberal branches and divisional organisations existed within each State and Territory Division since 1945 the Federal Young Liberal Movement wasn't founded until 1966 following a motion at the Federal Council of the Liberal Party. The first meeting of the new national movement took place on 4 March 1967. By 1968, it was decided that the Young Liberals should hold their own annual National Conventions – a tradition that continues.

The 1974 Federal Council of the Liberal Party agreed to a proposal for the Young Liberals' senior positions to be elected by a Young Liberal Federal Council, consisting of 6 delegates per Division (and held concurrently with the National Convention at which all Young Liberals were eligible to attend). The senior positions were restructured and renamed, resulting in a "Federal President", "Federal Vice-President" and "Young Liberal Federal Executive".

The Young Liberal representation on the senior party's Executive was expanded to two positions, while the movement was also given a seat on the Joint Standing Committee on Federal Policy.

In 1982, the movement produced a national publication called 'The Young Australian' which was published until 2013.

In 2007, the QLD division of the Liberal Party of Australia and the QLD National Party merged to become the Liberal National Party of Queensland. As part of this merger process the Queensland Young Liberals and the Queensland Young Nationals were merged to become the Young Liberal National Party (Young LNP). The Young LNP is effectively the Queensland division of both the federal Young Liberals and the Federal Young Nationals.

== Structure ==
There are two elected officers; the President and the Vice-President who are supported by an Executive made up of State and Territory Young Liberal Presidents and appointed Federal Officers. The Federal President and Federal Vice-President are members of the powerful Liberal Party Federal Executive which also includes the Prime Minister and other senior Liberal Party figures.

Each Young Liberal State and Territory division is governed by its own rules and constitution with each undertaking different methods for the election of their President, executive, and delegates.

=== List of federal presidents ===
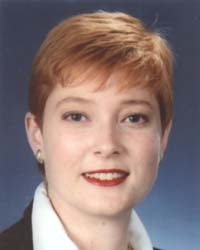
Former Minister for Foreign Affairs Marise Payne was the first female Federal President (1989 to 1991).

List of federal presidents of the Young Liberals:

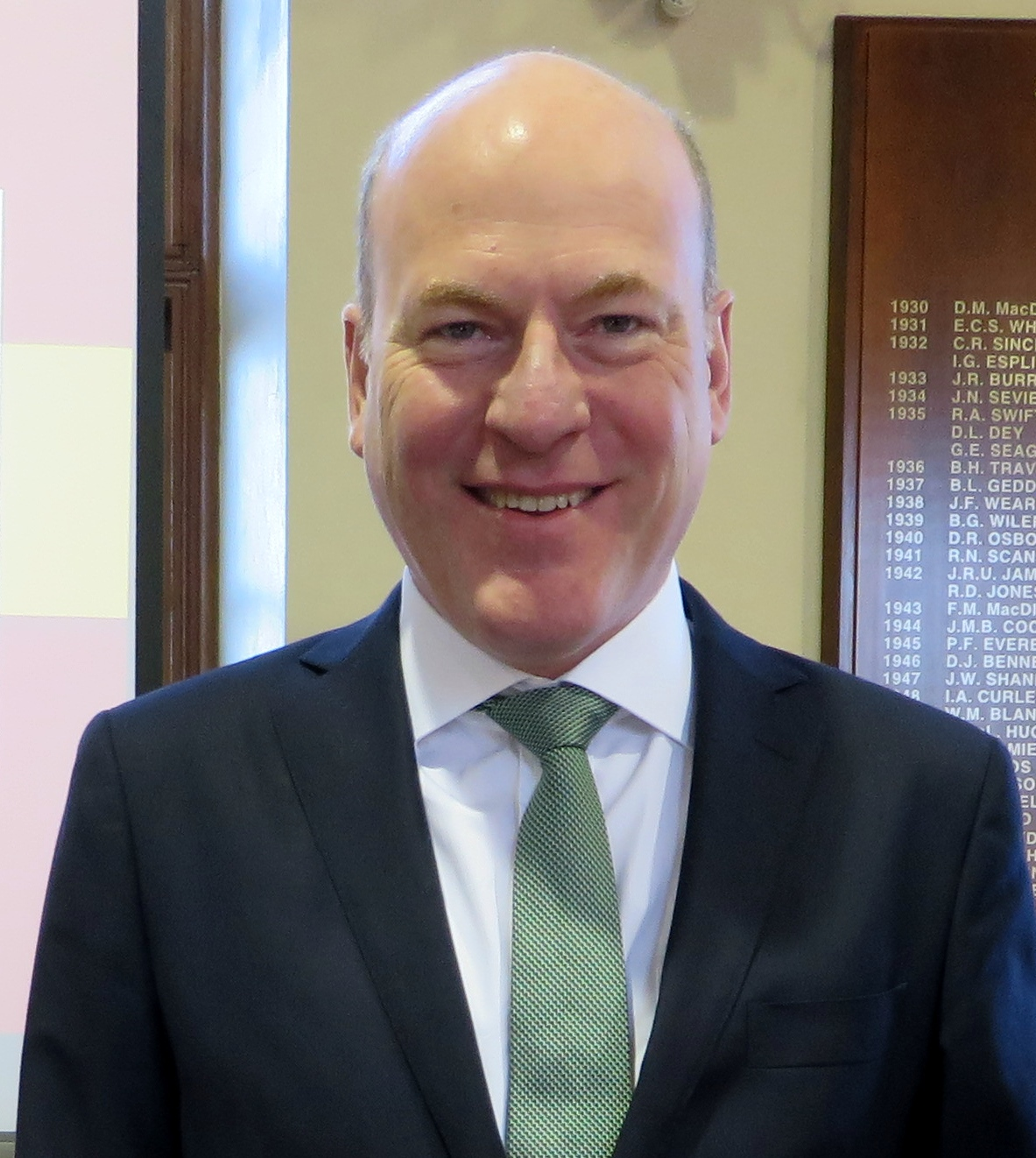
Trent Zimmerman, the first openly LGBTI member of the House of Representatives, served as Federal President (1993 to 1994).

- 1967–68: Graham Jones (NSW)
- 1968–69: Leo Hawkins (VIC)
- 1969–72: Warren McCullagh (NSW)
- 1972–73: Greg Vickery (QLD)
- 1973–74: Philip Ruddock (NSW)
- 1974–75: Michael Loftus (VIC)
- 1975–78: Chris Puplick (NSW)
- 1978–79: Bruce Noble (SA)
- 1979–80: Greg Goebel (QLD)
- 1980–81: Robert Nestdale (NSW)
- 1981–82: Saul Eslake (TAS)
- 1982–83: Mark Birrell (VIC)
- 1983–85: Chris Crawford (NSW)
- 1985–87: Peter Coatman (VIC)
- 1987–88: Kim Jacobs (SA)
- 1988–89: Cam Tinley (WA)
- 1989–91: Marise Payne (NSW)
- 1991–92: Peter Torbey (Vic)
- 1992–93: Stephen Forshaw (ACT)
- 1993–94: Trent Zimmerman (NSW)
- 1994–95: Ross McClymont (Vic)
- 1995–96: Leon Beswick (Tas)
- 1996–97: Matthew Marks (SA)
- 1997–98: Jason Falinski (NSW)
- 1998–99: Matthew Boland (QLD)
- 1999–00: Marc Dale (WA)
- 2000–01: Brett Hogan (Vic)
- 2001–02: Gerard Paynter (QLD)
- 2002–04: Grant Muller (QLD)
- 2004–05: Nick Park (QLD)
- 2005–06: Alex Hawke (NSW)
- 2006–08: Mark Powell (QLD)
- 2008–09: Noel McCoy (NSW)
- 2009–10: Rachel Fry (Tas)
- 2010–11: Richard Wilson (WA)
- 2011–12: Michael van Dissel (SA)
- 2012–13: Trent Hasson (Tas)
- 2013–14: Tom White (WA)
- 2014–15: Ben Riley (QLD)
- 2015–16: Simon Brehney (Vic)
- 2016–17: Claire Chandler (Tas)
- 2017–18: Aiden Depiazzi (WA)
- 2018–19: Josh Manuatu (ACT)
- 2019–20: Liam Staltari (WA)
- 2020-21: Jocelyn Sutcliffe (SA)
- 2021-22: Michael Heydon (WA)
- 2022-23: Clark Cooley (Tas/NSW)
- 2023–24: Dimitry Palmer (NSW)
- 2024-25: Darcy Creighton (QLD)
- 2025-26: Evi Cacas Shahin (SA)
- 2026- Cooper Gannon (NSW)

== Campaigns ==
=== Voluntary Student Unionism ===
In 2005, the Howard government introduced legislation to repeal compulsory student unionism in Australia following an effective campaign run by the Young Liberal Movement, notably led by its then Federal President, now Federal MP, Alex Hawke.

=== Make Education Fair ===
In February 2008, the Young Liberals launched a campaign titled Make Education Fair that alleged there was bias in the educational system. The Young Liberals were motivated by comments by former Prime Minister John Howard who said "The left-liberal grip on educational institutions and large, though not all, sections of the media remains intense".

In response to the campaign, the Senate announced an Inquiry into Academic Freedom in June 2008 with the Inquiry into Academic Freedom - Parliament of Australia terms of reference. Others described the campaign as a "witch hunt" or McCarthyism, and as an attack on the professionalism of academics. In response to Make Education Fair, the National Tertiary Education Union said "there is no evidence of widespread left-wing bias" and launched its own campaign entitled "Academic Freedom Watch". The President of the NTEU dismissed the accusation that academics are running their own agendas in the classroom as "nonsense". New South Wales Greens politician John Kaye said "any school or university educator who expresses an opinion would be at risk from the young Liberals plan to create a McCarthy-ist environment on campuses and schools"

=== Student Services and Amenities Fee ===
Since 2016, the Young Liberals have taken a strong position against the Student Services and Amenities Fee, including publishing a comprehensive report on the subject.

== Controversies ==
In 2005, the Young Liberals in Melbourne attracted media attention for their antisocial behaviour at social functions and accusations of rivalry between the Australian Liberal Students' Federation and the Young Liberal Movement.

On 17 July 2006, the Australian Broadcasting Corporation's Four Corners program broadcast allegations that factional leaders within the Liberal Party in New South Wales had been used "as the foot soldiers in factional warfare in which control goes to the faction which has the most branches.". Former federal Liberal leader John Hewson expressed concern that in more recent times, the right faction had taken control of the Young Liberals in New South Wales in an "extreme right takeover", that "in my day as leader the Young Liberals were a burr under my saddle from the left", whereas now they had come to support the agenda of right factional leaders such as David Clarke.

In July 2006, Young Liberal Movement was the subject of controversy after the ABC's Lateline program aired footage from the 2005 National Union of Students' conference in Ballarat. The video showed Liberal students chanting "We're racist, we're sexist, we're homophobic". The president of the New South Wales Young Liberals released a statement condemning the outbursts.

During a conference for Liberals in July 2008 in Canberra, about 40 university students from the Australian Liberal Students' Federation - some of them Young Liberals, were thrown out and banned from a youth hostel after an all night drinking rampage and disruptive behaviour, including some of them being caught having sex in the hostel.

In April 2010, Nick Sowden, a Young Liberal National party member from Queensland, likened US President Barack Obama to a monkey on his Twitter account. After a backlash, Sowden responded by saying that it was a poor attempt at irony that had been taken out of context. As a result of the comments, he was expelled from the party. Further controversy arose in June 2010, when a member of the Young Liberal National Party organised an event via Facebook to celebrate the ill health of former Australian Prime Minister, Gough Whitlam. The event, which 17 members of the Young Liberal National Party are reported to have subsequently attended, aimed to celebrate that "The old man is old and nearly dead, he got sacked, and he is just shit. So lets [sic] celebrate and be happy".

In September 2012, during a Young Liberals dinner in Sydney, Alan Jones spoke concerning the death of the then Prime Minister Julia Gillard's father. Jones said that Ms Gillard had "died of shame to think that his daughter told lies every time she stood for parliament". Jones' speech was secretly recorded by a News Limited journalist.

In July 2013, Queensland YLNP President Ben Riley was suspended for a period of six months for swiping a pair of RM Williams boots on display at that year's LNP Convention. Riley put on the boots, wore them around and spilt beer on them. The day after Riley offered to pay for the boots, however he was still suspended.

In April 2014, during hearings by the Independent Commission Against Corruption (New South Wales) into the alleged corrupt conduct of MP Chris Hartcher, it was revealed that a Hartcher staff member who is also Young Liberal member set up a "black ops" team inspired by the film Fight Club with the intention of destroying political opponents.

In 2014, A Liberal Party campaigner who had been a leading member of the Young Liberals in Geelong, Scott Harrison, was revealed to have been a member of Creativity Movement organisation for six years prior to 2010, but had turned his back on those beliefs. He resigned from the Liberal Party after anti-Semitic articles written by him emerged, including airing a theory that the Port Arthur massacre was master-minded by Jews, as well as a photo of him gesturing with a Nazi salute in front of a swastika.

In August 2014, Young Liberal students from Melbourne University were reported to have been posting misogynistic, crude and racist comments on their Facebook page. One comment in particular referred to, 75-year-old academic, Germaine Greer as a "lying fucking cum guzzling slut".

In September 2015, a New South Wales Young Liberal Council meeting caused controversy after an alleged altercation occurred. Young Liberal and member of the conservatives Jakov Miljak allegedly grappled Moderate James Camillieri following a debate over the Liberal Party of Australia leadership spill, September 2015. The following day Mr Miljak resigned from his part-time employment with Senator Concetta Fierravanti-Wells.

In April 2017, Young Liberal and President of the Melbourne University Liberal Club, Xavier Boffa was accused of telling a female member of the club that she was not invited to an event because 'a couple of the guys were uncomfortable about inviting a chick'.

In October 2017, the same woman made a complaint to police that Mr Boffa had screamed that she was "disgraceful" and "shameful" while demanding that she get out of his personal space after a heated club meeting. It was also alleged that he assaulted another male club member from an opposing faction, although the allegation was denied by other witnesses.

In February 2019, four members of the NSW Young Liberals were suspended from the party for six months when they approached women on Tinder in order to convince them to vote Liberal, and then shared personal information about the women and made "lewd and derogatory" comments about them in a group chat room that was meant for planning the group's campaigning efforts. Several women in the chat complained to NSW Young Liberals president Harry Stutchbury (son of Michael Stutchbury), who said that the behaviour was unacceptable but took no further action. Liberal Party officials did not learn of the events until 12 months later, via The Sun-Herald, at which point NSW Liberals' state director Chris Stone applied the suspension.

In July 2019, former Australian Liberal Students Federation past president Xavier Boffa was accused by Melbourne University Liberal Club member Benedict Kusay of having allegedly glassed him at a bar in Adelaide. Although Kusay sought Boffa's expulsion from the Liberal Party, no disciplinary action was taken. Boffa was subsequently found not guilty of assaulting Kusay, with Adelaide Magistrate Simon Smart finding that, as a witness, 'Kusay was not entirely impartial' and that there were 'concerns about his reliability'.

In December 2019, Young LNP Treasurer Oscar Green was disciplined after a photo surfaced of him with campaign corflutes belonging to rival parties. Senior Labor sources identified the corflutes as those that went missing during the state campaign. Though Green denied stealing the signs, his membership was suspended as a result of the discovery. At the same time the LNP were also responding to a separate incident involving Green, whereby he posted on social media a video of himself playing with what looked like a 'wooden penis'. However, in regards to the video, the party saw no grounds for disciplinary action.

In December 2019, Chairman of the Gold Coast Young LNP Barclay McGain and member Jake Scott faced controversy after a video was released on the Young Liberal's Facebook page. The video showed McGain purporting to be interviewing young adults at random during Schoolies week regarding their opinions of Prime Minister Scott Morrison. In one interview McGain is shown laughing as Scott criticised Aboriginal Australians for being in-able to "even invent the bloody wheel". Scott described himself in the video as "a bit of a leftie", however, subsequent investigations showed him to be a Liberal Party volunteer and active Young Liberal member. Scott and McGain both declined to comment on the video, which was widely criticised and labelled as racist by the Queensland State Government. McGain was later suspended from his role as party leader, pending further internal investigation from the Liberal Party.

The 2020 ACT Election saw an internal ACT Liberal Party investigation revolve around the then ACT Young Liberal President Ben Dennehy for the destruction of Kurrajong MLA, Candice Burch's, campaign corfultes. It has been asserted that the ACT electoral system of Hare-Clark lends itself to internal party fights. The victim of these attacks, Candice Burch, was battling to maintain the fifth Kurrajong seat, however was unsuccessful. Within the ACT Liberal Party bringing the party into disrepute is an offence the ACT Liberal Party constitution deems worthy of expulsion. The investigation began in November 2020 and concluded with the resignation of Ben Dennehy and a second ACT Young Liberal who was not named in media sources. Evidence leading to Dennehy's resignation included the discovery of video footage of him 'getting out of his car and slashing Ms Burch's corflutes'. It has been noted that this may not have been the first instance in which Dennehy has vandalized campaign material. 2019 independent ACT Senate candidate Anthony Pesec commented on social media that Dennehy was 'ripping corflutes down all over town' during the 2019 election.

In 2022, It was reported a former Young Liberal Stefan Eracleous was linked to the National Socialist Network.

In October 2024, at a University of Sydney Student Representative Council meeting, three members were filmed destroying copies of the 2018 Red Zone Report. This report detailing experiences of sexual violence and hazing across residential colleges, produced by an investigation from End Rape on Campus Australia. This resulted in nationwide criticisms, an internal investigation ordered by NSW Liberal leader Mark Speakman and two of the students work experience in Paul Fletcher's electorate office cancelled, and expulsions and suspensions handed out to persons involved. In November 2024, Bearte (Bea) McDonald was suspended from the Liberal Party for six months and Amelia Findlay was ordered to pay $20,000 plus legal costs for the defamation of McDonald as a result of a TikTok video capturing her at the problematic meeting.

== See also ==
- Queensland Young LNP
- Western Australian Young Liberals
- South Australian Young Liberal Movement
